= KLC discography =

This is the production discography of Craig "KLC" Lawson, an American hip hop music producer from New Orleans, Louisiana, and lead producer of the production team The Medicine Men. Lawson is credited (solo and with other team members) on close to 300 studio recordings covering over 100 studio albums. His RIAA accolades include approximately eighteen gold albums, twelve platinum albums, four double-platinum albums, two triple-platinum albums, and one quadruple-platinum album as well as two gold singles, two platinum singles and one double-platinum single. Lawson has two Grammy Award nominations, both at the 45th Annual Grammy Awards for "Best Rap Album" (Word of Mouf by Ludacris and Tarantula by Mystikal) and two BMI Awards - one for the hit single Move Bitch (by Ludacris) and one for the associated album Word of Mouf.

== Studio albums ==
List of albums and single, with peak chart positions, RIAA certifications and other awards

Year	Album Title	Artist	Single Title(s)	Certification and Billboard Chart Positions
1988	Ain't Nuthin Nice (Single)	MC Jro J		—
1991	Clockin' b/w Pumped in Power (Single)	39 Posse		—
1993	39 Automatic	39 Posse	Got What It Takes To Make It (Remix); Bitch I'm Dart; 39 Automatic; Hot Spot; Stuntin´ Stars; Ask Them Hoes; Pass The Snake; Bonus Beat	—
1993	No Elevation	E.X.D. (Hounds of Gert Town)	Intro I; No Elevation; Blow Of Death; Play You Bitches Dumb; Intro II; Knockin' Niggas Off; Another Brother Filla Coffin	—
1994	Dark Side	Soulja Slim	You Got It; The Darkside ft. 6 Shot; Slippin'; How Ya Figga	—
1994	Jackin' For Bounce	Sporty aka Sporty T	Frank White	—
1995	True	TRU	I'm Bout' It, Bout It ft. Mia X	—
1995	Ghetto Stories	Tre-8	Ghetto Stories; G Like Me (Bonus)	—
1995	I Wanna Be With You (single Cd)	Mia X	Broke Bitch	—
1995	Good Girl Gone Bad	Mia X	Ghetto Sarah Lee ft. The Conscious Daughters; Payback II; R.I.P., Jil	—
1996	7 Sins	Kane & Abel	Black Jesus ft. Master P; Basement Session ft. Mia X, Skandalus, Steph; That's How It Gon' Happen 2 U; 3/2 Murder 1; Jealous Again ft. Mia X	—
1996	Hoodlum Fo' Life	Skull Duggery	Crooked Ass Cops; The Circle	—
1996	Ice Cream Man	Master P	Intro; Time To Check My Crackhouse; Bout It Bout It II ft. Mia X; Back Up Off Me; Killer Pussy	RIAA certification: Platinum; Billboard 200 - #26; R&B/Hip-Hop - #3
1996	The Saga Continues	Sporty T	I'm Alright (Radio); He Shot - I Shot; Grams; Another Hit; He Shot - I Shot (Drama)	—
1996	The Shocker	Silkk The Shocker	The Shocker ft. Master P; If My 9 Could Talk; It's On; No Limit Party ft. Master P, Mia X; Mr. (with Carlos Stephens)	—
1997	Destiny's Child	Destiny's Child	With Me Part 2 ft. Master P	RIAA certification: Platinum; Billboard 200 - #67; R&B/Hip-Hop - #6; Canada Top 50 Albums - #16; Dutch Albums Chart - #19; UK Albums Chart - #45
1997	If I Could Change - Steady Mobb'n (single cd)	Mia X	Down To Do Whatever	—
1997	Ghetto D	Master P	Ghetto D ft. C-Murder, Silkk The Shocker; We Riders ft. Mac; Come And Get Some; Weed & Hennessey ft. C-Murder, Silkk The Shocker; I Miss My Homies; Make 'Em Say Uhh!	RIAA certification: 3× Platinum; Billboard 200 - #1; R&B/Hip-Hop - #1; I Miss My Homies: RIAA Certification: Gold; Hot 100 - #25; Hot R&B/Hip-Hop - #16; Hot Rap - #2; Make 'Em Say Uhh!: RIAA certification: Platinum; Hot Rap - #11; Hot Dance - #23; Hot R&B/Hip-Hop - #25; Rhythmic Top 40 - #32; Hot 100 - #16
1997	Ginuwine...The Bachelor	Ginuwine	When Doves Cry (Kid Kut Remix)	RIAA certification: 2× Platinum; Billboard 200 - #26; R&B/HipHop - #1
1997	Life Insurance	Mr. Serv-On	5 Hollow Points ft. Big Ed, Fiend, Mia X, Kane & Abel; Affiliated; Heaven Is So Close ft. Master P, Silkk The Shocker; Throw Ya City Up; Time To Check My Fetty ft. Master P; Tryin' To Make It Out Da Ghetto ft. Master P; We Ain't The Same ft. Mo B. Dick; Who Raised Me ft. Fiend; You Know I Would ft. Mia X	Billboard 200 - #23; R&B/HipHop - #5
1997	Pre-Meditated Drama	Steady Mobb'n	It's On ft. Master P, Fiend; Up To No Good ft. Big Ed, Mia X, Master P	Billboard 200 - #29; R&B/HipHop - #6
1997	TRU 2 Da Game	TRU	No Limit Soldiers; I Always Feel Like...; There Dey Go; I Got Candy; What They Call Us?; Swamp Nigga; Eyes Of A Killa; Heaven 4 A Gangsta (TRU Remix); Freak Hoes; 1nce Upon A Time; They Can't Stop Us!; The Lord Is Testin Me; No Limit Soldiers (Club Mix)	RIAA certification: 2× Platinum; Billboard 200 - #8; R&B/HipHop - #2
1997	Unlady Like	Mia X	I'll Take Yo Man '97 ft. Salt-n-Pepa, Hurby Luv Bug; Let's Get It Straight; R.I.P., Jil; Thank You ft. Mo B. Dick, T.C., Mercedes; Unlady Like; You Don't Wanna Go 2 War ft. Master P, Silkk The Shocker, C-Murder, Mystikal; Mama's Family (with Craig B.) ft. Kane & Abel, Mr. Serv-On; Rainy Dayz (with Craig B., Mo B. Dick)	RIAA Certification: Gold; Billboard 200 - #21; R&B/HipHop - #2
1997	Unpredictable	Mystikal	Ain't No Limit ft. Silkk The Shocker; Born 2 Be a Soldier ft. Master P, Silkk The Shocker; Gangstas ft. Master P, Snoop Dogg; Ghetto Child ft. Master P, Silkk The Shocker; It Yearns; Shine	RIAA certification: Platinum; Billboard 200 - #3; R&B/HipHop - #1
1998	Am I My Brother's Keeper	Kane & Abel	Am I My Brother's Keeper; Betta Kill Me (with Craig B); Bout That Combat; Greens, Cornbread and Cabbage ft. Master P, Prime Suspects; Let's Go Get 'Em; Throw Them Thangs ft. Magic; Out of Town Bs ft. Snoop Dogg; Watch Me ft. Mystikal, Silkk The Shocker, Soulja Slim; My Hood to Yo Hood	RIAA Certification: Gold; Billboard 200 - #5; Top R&B/Hip-Hop Albums - #1
1998	The Assassin	Big Ed	Make Some Room; Uh Oh; Assassin	—
1998	Black Mafia	Steady Mobb'n	Hit A Lick ft. Prime Suspects; Lil Niggas ft. Lil Soldiers; Niggas Like Me ft. Mystikal, Silkk The Shocker	—
1998	Charge It 2 Da Game	Silkk The Shocker	I'm A Soldier ft. Master P, Fiend, C-Murder, Mac, Mystikal, Mia X, Big Ed; Let Me Hit It ft. Mystikal	RIAA certification: Platinum; Billboard 200 - #3; R&B/Hip-Hop- #1
1998	Da Game Is to Be Sold, Not to Be Told	Snoop Dogg	Doggz Gonna Get Ya; Get Bout It and Rowdy ft. Master P; Snoop World ft. Master P; Tru Tank Dogs ft. Mystikal; Ain't Nut'in Personal ft. C-Murder, Silkk the Shocker	RIAA certification: 2× Platinum; Billboard 200 - #1; R&B/Hip-Hop- #1
1998	Doin' Thangs	Big Bear	No Matter What	—
1998	The Game of Funk	Sons of Funk	Make Love To A Thug; Sons Reasons; Got The Hook-Up!	Billboard 200 - #44; R&B/Hip-Hop - #14
1998	Ghetto Fabulous	Mystikal	Dirty South / Dirty Jerz' ft. Naughty By Nature; I'm On Fire; Round Out The Tank; Watcha Want, Watcha Need ft. Busta Rhymes; Yaah!	RIAA certification: Platinum; Billboard 200 - #5; R&B/Hip-Hop- #1
1998	Ghetto Organized	Gambino Family	Don't Cry ft. Gotti, Fiend, Q.B., Magic, C-Murder; I'm a Baller ft. Master P, C-Murder, Fiend, Mia X; Make 'Em Bleed ft. Silkk The Shocker, Fiend, Mr. Serv-On; Only G's Ride ft. Mystikal, Mo B. Dick; Drama in My Cityft. Ghetto Commission, KLC	Billboard 200 - #17; R&B/Hip-Hop- #3
1998	Give It 2 'Em Raw	Soulja Slim	At The Same Time ft. Snoop Dogg; Only Real N...; You Got It (II); Wootay; What's Up, What's Happening; Getting Real; Pray for Your Baby (with Mo B. Dick and Odell)	Billboard 200 - #13
1998	Guilty 'Til Proven Innocent	Prime Suspects	Ride Wit My Heat; My Old Lady; Tweekin'; We Gots To Do 'Em; Consequences Of The Streets; Daily Routine; Young Niggas	Billboard 200 - #36; R&B/Hip-Hop- #14
1998	Let's Ride	Montell Jordan	Let's Ride (as Engineer for remixes)	RIAA Certification: Gold; Billboard 200 - #20; R&B/Hip-Hop - #8; RIAA certification (single): Platinum; Hot 100 Singles - #2; Hot R&B/Hip-Hop Songs - #1; Rhythmic Top 40 Singles - #7; Hot Dance Singles - #35
1998	Life or Death	C-Murder	Down 4 My Niggaz ft. Snoop Dogg, Magic; Akickdoe ft. UGK, Master P; A Second Chance; Only the Strong Survive (with Odell) ft. Master P; Dreams ft. KLC; Feel My Pain; On the Run ft. Soulja Slim, Da Hound; Riders; Soldiers ft. Master P, Silkk The Shocker, Fiend, Mac, Mia X, Big Ed, Kane & Abel, Mystikal; Survival of the Fittest ft. Gotti; Where I'm From ft. Prime Suspects	RIAA certification: Platinum; Billboard 200 - #3; Heatseekers - #21; R&B/Hip-Hop- #1
1998	Mama Drama	Mia X	Bring It On ft. C-Murder, Fiend, Mac, Mystikal, Skull Duggery; Fallen Angels (Dear Jill); Flip 2 Rip ft. Mac, KLC; I Think Somebody ft. Fiend; Mama Drama ft. Fiend, Mystikal; Mama's Tribute; Play Wit Pussy; Puttin' It Down; Thugs Like Me ft. Fiend, Kane & Abel, Mac, Mystikal	Billboard 200 - #7; R&B/Hip-Hop- #3
1998	Memorial Day	Full Blooded	Countdown ft. Camouflage, Steady Mobb'n; The Quickest Way To Die ft. E.X.D. (Hounds from Gert Town), Mo B. Dick	Heatseekers - #1; R&B/Hip-Hop- #20
1998	MP Da Last Don	Master P	Let My 9 Get Em; Make 'Em Say Uhh #2 ft. Silkk The Shocker, Fiend, Snoop Dogg, Mia X; More 2 Life; The Ghetto's Got Me Trapped ft. Silkk The Shocker, Sons of Funk; Till We Dead And Gone ft. Bone Thugs-n-Harmony; Let's Get 'Em	RIAA certification: 4× Platinum; Billboard 200 - #1; Hot R&B/Hip-Hop Singles - #18 (Make 'Em Say Uhh #2)
1998	My Balls and My Word	Young Bleed	Keep It Real; Bring The Noise; How Ya Do Dat; Times So Hard (with Odell) ft. Master P, Fiend	RIAA certification: Gold
1998	The Recipe	Mack 10	Made Niggaz ft. Master P, Mystikal	RIAA certification: Gold; Billboard 200 - #15; R&B/Hip-Hop- #6
1998	Shell Shocked	Mac	Murda, Murda, Kill, Kill; We Don't Love 'Em; Wooo; The Game; Memories; Meet Me At The Hotel; Empire; Shell Shocked (Outro)	Billboard 200 - #11; R&B/Hip-Hop- #4
1998	Sky's The Limit	Magic	Ghetto Godzilla; No Hope; Take It To Da Streets; I Never; New Generation; Gimpin'; Chastity	Billboard 200 - #15; R&B/Hip-Hop- #3
1998	There's One in Every Family	Fiend	Big Timer ft. Mia X; Do You Know? ft. Master P, Mystikal; Do You Wanna Be a Rider ft. Magic, Prime Suspects, Gambino Family; For the N.O.; Live Me Long; Slangin' ft. UGK; Take My Pain ft. Master P, Silkk The Shocker, Sons of Funk; Walk Like a G ft. Soulja Slim; We Survivors ft. Full Blooded; What Cha Mean ft. Soulja Slim, Kane & Abel, Mac	RIAA certification: Gold; Billboard 200 - #8; R&B/Hip-Hop- #1
1998	These Wicked Streets	Skull Duggery	Shakin’ In The Streets ft. KLC; It's No Limit; If U Feel ft. C-Murder, Silkk The Shocker	Billboard 200 - #21; Heatseekers - #41; R&B/Hip-Hop - #4
1998	Wise Guys	Ghetto Commission	Get 'Em Up; Lost Thugs	Billboard 200 - #59; Top R&B/Hip-Hop Albums - #12
1999	Bossalinie	C-Murder	Freedom; Money Talks; Where We Wanna	RIAA certification: Gold; Billboard 200 - #2; R&B/Hip-Hop - #1
1999	Boot Camp	Lil Soldiers	Mama Need A New Blouse; Chipped Out Tank; For My Shorties; Soulja By Blood; Bring It 2 You	—
1999	Da Crime Family	TRU	Hoody Hoo; Don't Judge Me; Buss That; Don't Fuck With TRU	RIAA Certification: Gold; Billboard 200 - #5; R&B/Hip-Hop - #2; R&B/Hip-Hop Singles (Hoody Hoo) - #31
1999	Da Next Level	Mr. Serv-On	Boot 'Em Up; My Story; Tank Nigga; The Last Song	Billboard 200 - #14; R&B/Hip-Hop - #1
1999	Gangsta Harmony	Mo B. Dick	Mo B's Theme; Got 2 Git Mine	Billboard 200 - #66; R&B/Hip-Hop - #16
1999	90-99	Hype Enough Records: Limited Edition EP)	SouljaFaLyfe; Made For Walkin; Powda Bag; Kickin It For Them Hoes; Bitch Nigga; You Got It; Slippin; Lil Bit	—
1999	Made Man	Silkk The Shocker	I Want To Be With You; All Because Of You ft. Mia X; No Limit ft. Fiend; Mr.'99; This Is 4 My ft. Fiend; Get It Up (with Craig B., Odell) ft. Snoop Dogg	RIAA certification: Platinum; Billboard 200 - #1; R&B/Hip-Hop - #1
1999	No Limit Top Dogg	Snoop Dogg	Down for My N's ft. C-Murder, Magic; Ghetto Symphony ft. Mia X, Fiend, C-Murder, Silkk The Shocker, Mystikal, Goldie Loc	RIAA certification: Platinum; Billboard 200 - #2; R&B/Hip-Hop- #1; (Canada) Top 100 - #10; Hot R&B/Hip-Hop Singles & Tracks - #29 (Down 4 My Niggaz)
1999	On Top of da World	Lil Italy	Hoez and Tramps ft. Fiend; We Ain't Hard to Find ft. Snoop Dogg, Mystikal	Billboard 200 - #99; R&B/Hip-Hop - #20
1999	Street Life	Fiend	Been Thru It All ft. Magic; If They Don't Know; Mr. Whomp Whomp; Talk It How I Bring It; The Rock Show; They Don't Hear Me; Trip To London ft. Mo B. Dick, Kage, Odell; Waiting On God; Walk That Line; War 4 Reason	Billboard 200 - #15; R&B/Hip-Hop - #1
1999	The Message	Eddie Griffin	This is For The Riders ft. Master P, Silkk the Shocker, Fiend, (with Mo B. Dick)	—
2000	Let's Get Ready	Mystikal	Ready to Rumble (with Craig B., Odell, Mo B. Dick); Big Truck Boys; Murder III	RIAA certification: 2× Platinum(US); Certified Gold (Export); Billboard 200 - #1; R&B/Hip-Hop - #1
2000	War Is Me, Pt. 1: Battle Decisions	Mr. Serv-On	What They Do ft. Fiend, Three 6 Mafia; Whatcha Want ft. KLC	—
2000	Ghetto Platinum	5th Ward Weebie	Show Dat Work; Club Hoppers P Poppers; Word; Whatever	—
2000	3rd Ward Stepper The Album	Skull Duggery	The Grudge	—
2001	The Actual Meaning	6 Shot	Itz Ya Dog; Ruthless Renegade	—
2001	The Prezident	E-Dub	Bad Az I Wanna Be ft. Mr. Serv-On, 6 Shot, Fiend, Skull Duggery	—
2001	Tarantula	Mystikal	Big Truck Driver; Pussy Crook; Paper Stack ft. Dart, Beezy Boy, Shonnie; That's That Shit; The Return	RIAA Certification: Gold; Billboard 200 - #25; R&B/Hip-Hop - #4; 45th Grammy Awards (nominated), Best Rap Album
2001	Untamed	Full Blooded & H.O.U.N.D. Faculty	What It Be Like	—
2001	Word of Mouf	Ludacris	Move Bitch ft. Mystikal, I-20	RIAA certification: 3× Platinum; Billboard 200 - #3; R&B/Hip-Hop - #1; 45th Grammy Awards (nominated), Best Rap Album; Hot 100 - #10; Hot R&B/Hip-Hop Singles & Tracks - #3; Hot Rap Tracks - #3; Rhythmic Top 40 - #3
2002	Ready for Combat	Big Slack	Cock Strong Guerrillas	—
2002	This Is Real	Hard Knox	It's Like That; This Is Real; Put 'Um Up	—
2003	Diplomatic Immunity (album)	The Diplomats	Bout It Bout It Part III ft. Master P	—
2003	Juve The Great	Juvenile	For Everybody ft. Skip, Wacko	RIAA certification: Platinum
2003	Win, Lose or Draw	Don Yute	Blim Blam (with Craig B) ft. Raquel Akua	—
2003	Mississippi: The Album	David Banner	What It Do ft. Smoke D	—
2003	Raw & Uncut	Turk	Amped Up	Top R&B/Hip-Hop Albums - #22; Top Independent Albums- #15
2003	Where’s My Money	Young Hustlaz		—
2003	Years Later...A Few Months After	Soulja Slim	U Hear Dat; Souljas On My Feet	—
2003	Reality Check	Young A	Come Serve Me ft. Soulja Slim, B.G.; Come Serve Me (remix) ft. Soulja Slim, Mia X	—
2004	Game Over	Ke'Noe	Big Thangs ft. B.G.	—
2004	Life After Cash Money	B.G.	Do What You Wanna Do ft. 6 Shot, Big Gipp; Don't Talk To Me	—
2004	Urban Legend	T.I.	What They Do ft. B.G.	RIAA certification: Platinum; Billboard 200 - #7; R&B/Hip-Hop - #1; Billboard Top Rap - #1
2005	Club Bangaz	Partners-N-Crime	Club Bangaz ft. Juvenile	—
2005	Glamorest Life	Trina	Shake Wit It (with Fiend) ft. Lil Scrappy	—
2005	The Heart of tha Streetz, Vol. 1	B.G.	Get Up	—
2005	The Peoples Champ	Paul Wall	Internet Going Nutz	RIAA certification: Platinum; Billboard 200 - #1; R&B/Hip-Hop - #1
2005	Trill	Bun B	Bun	RIAA certification: Gold; Billboard 200 - #6; R&B/Hip-Hop - #1
2006	The Truest Shit I Ever Said	C-Murder	My Life	Billboard 200 - #41; R&B/Hip-Hop - #5; Independent Albums - #1
2006	The Addiction	Fiend	Want It All; Gotta Get It; What Is U Sayin	—
2006	My Block: Miami The Mixtape	DJ EFN		—
2006	My Homies Part 2	Scarface	Club Bangaz ft. Partners-N-Crime	—
2006	The Tru Story: Continued	C-Murder		—
2007	Get Money, Stay True	Paul Wall	I'm Real, What Are You?	—
2008	Life Insurance 2: Heartmuzik	Mr. Serv-On	Hood Made Me ft. Calicoe, KLC	—
2009	Thug Brothers	Soulja Slim & B.G.	Runnin'	—
2009	Stay Ready	Lil Dee	Stay Ready; Naw Takin Bout; How I Got Here	—
2009	Too Hood 2 Be Hollywood	B.G.	Nigga Owe Me Some Money ft. Soulja Slim, Lil Boosie, C-Murder; Hit The Block & Roll	—
2010	Grand Theft Audio: The Mixtape	Calicoe the Champ, Mystikal, Mia X, Fiend, Mr. Serv-On		—
2010	I'ont Like You (Single)	Mystikal ft. Fiend		—
2010	Dat's Money (Single)	Fetti ft. T-Bo		—
2011	That Woman (Single)	Mystikal		—
2012	Grand Larceny	Calicoe the Champ		—
2012	Bullshit (Single)	Mystikal		—
2012	Forgiven	Rubis	Fatal Attraction	—
2012	Reloaded	Slim Reaper	Go Off; Above the Law; Ignant	—
2012	1993 Lp	Flow Jonez	One Two	—
2012	Code Red (Single)	Red Sonya	Code Red	—
2012	The Wrath	Amaze-njznicest, Snoop Dogg	Wow	—
2013	Hit Me (Single)	Mystikal		—
2013	Lundi Gras	Fat 2s Day	Always; Better Late Than Never	—
2013	Dedicated 2 The Greatest (Single)	Mo B. Dick		—
2013	Priest Andretti	Curren$y	Trip To London ft. Fiend	—
2013	$1000 (Single)	KLC		—
2013	Psalms of David II	Dee-1	Psalms of David II Intro (ft. Alainia)	—
2015	Duffy (Single)	Paco Troxclair		—
2015	Canal Street Confidential	Curren$y	Str8 ft.Corner Boy P & Fiend	—
2019	Mind Right (Single)	BIG Marv AKA Splitt		—
2021	The Drummajor Pt.1 KLC	KLC	—	
2023	She Says She Love Me	Gucci Mane and B.G.	—	
2026	Shake Your Booty Musscles	Juvenile	—	

"—" denotes a release that did not chart

== Compilation Albums and Movie Soundtracks ==
Blade Movie Soundtrack (1998) - Edge of the Blade (Mystikal)

- RIAA certification: Gold
- Billboard 200 - #36
- Billboard R&B/Hip-Hop - #28

Chef Aid: The South Park Album (1998) - Kenny's Dead (Master P)

- ARIA (Australia) - #1
- UK - #3

Down South Hustlers: Bouncin' and Swingin' (1995)

- RIAA certification: Gold
  - You Got It (Soulja Slim)
  - RIP (CCG) (with Mo B. Dick)
  - Murder Weapon (E.X.D./Hounds from Gert Town)

Foolish – Movie Soundtrack (1999)

- RIAA certification: Gold
- Billboard 200 - #32
- Top R&B/Hip-Hop Albums - #10
  - They Don't Hear Me (Fiend)
  - Yes Indeed (Kane & Abel)

How to Be a Player Movie Soundtrack (1997) - How to Be a Playa (Master P, Fiend, Silkk the Shocker)

- RIAA certification: Gold
- Billboard 200 - #7
- Billboard R&B/Hip-Hop - #2

I Got The Hook Up! Movie Soundtrack (1998)

- RIAA certification: Platinum
- Billboard 200 - #3
- Billboard R&B/Hip-Hop - #1
  - Hook It Up (Master P, Bone Thugs-n-Harmony)
  - Shake Something (Mystikal, Mia X, KLC)
  - Itch Or Scratch (Fiend, Mac, Prime Suspects)
  - We Got It (Mr. Serv-On, Big Ed, Magic, Fiend)
  - I Got The Hook-Up! (Master P, Sons of Funk)
    - RIAA Certified Gold Single (I Got The Hook Up)
    - Billboard Hot 100 - #16
    - Hot R&B/Hip-Hop Singles & Tracks - #11

I'm Bout It Movie Soundtrack (1997)

- RIAA certification: Gold
- Billboard 200 - #4
- Billboard R&B/HipHop - #1
  - What Cha Think (Mystikal)
  - How Ya Do Dat (Young Bleed)
  - Don't Mess Around (Fiend)
  - For Realz (Kane & Abel)
  - Cops Runnin' After Ya (Prime Suspects)

Mean Green: Major Players Compilation (1998)

- RIAA certification: Gold
- Billboard 200 - #9
- Top R&B/Hip-Hop Albums - #6
  - Mean Green (Intro)
  - We... (Fiend, Mac)
  - The Mirror Don't Lie (2 For 1)

Rhyme & Reason Movie Soundtrack (1997) - Is There a Heaven 4 a Gangsta? (Master P)

- RIAA certification: Gold
- Billboard 200 - #16
- R&B/HipHop - #1

Southwest Riders (1997) - Get Cha Mind Right (Mystikal)

- Billboard 200 - #23
- R&B/HipHop - #2

The Substitute Movie Soundtrack (1996) - Bang'Em Up (TRU, Mr. Serv-On)

We Can't Be Stopped (1998)

- No Limit Soldiers II (No Limit Soldiers)
- Girl Power (Mia X)
- Break Something (Fiend)
- Assassin (Big Ed)

West Coast Bad Boyz II (1997) - R.I.P. Tupac (Master P)

- Billboard 200 - #8
- R&B/HipHop - #2

Who U Wit? Compilation (1999)

- Billboard 200 - #62
- R&B/HipHop - #22
  - Cold Wit It (Fiend)
  - You Ain't A Baller (Magic)
  - Smash and Ball (Mr. Serv-On) (with Craig B., Odell, Mo B. Dick)
  - Pass the Ball (2 for 1) (with Craig B., Odell, Mo B. Dick)

== KLC tracks in pop culture ==
- Move Bitch was used in the movie ATL and the clean version was used in the movie Hancock.
- Move Bitch was referenced in the Smack Her With A Dick (Rap Stand Up) skit in Chris Rock's stand-up comedy movie Never Scared.
- In a scene of the movie, Bad Boys II, actor Will Smith quoted lyrics from Move Bitch.
- Down 4 My Niggaz was played in the movie Street Kings.
- At the 2010–2011 season opener, The Miami Heat entered the American Airlines Arena to a break instrumental of Down 4 My Niggaz and frequently use this song for home games.
- The lyrics of Down 4 My Niggaz were referenced in the book The Year Before the Flood: A Story of New Orleans by Ned Sublette.
- Get Back by Ludacris was used in Tropic Thunder

== Sampling and interpolation ==
The following is a list of songs that KLC sampled in some of his tracks as well as songs that sampled or interpolated tracks produced by KLC.

- 3/2 Murder 1 sampled How High by Method Man & Redman
- He Shot I Shot samples Eazy Duz It by Eazy-E
- Down 4 My Niggaz:
  - Green Goblin by Jae Millz (ft. Chris Brown) contains an interpolation from Down 4 My Niggaz
  - was sampled in If U Were The Girl by Monica
  - was interpolated in Tammy's Song (Her Evils) by Kendrick Lamar
  - "Blood on the Leaves" by Kanye West contains an interpolation from Down 4 My Niggaz
- Ghetto D sampled Eric B. Is President by Eric B. & Rakim
- Ghetto Symphony sampled The Symphony by Marley Marl which sampled Hard to Handle by Otis Redding
- I Got Candy sampled Candy (Cameo song) by Cameo
- I'll Take Ya Man sampled:
  - Flash Light by Parliament (band)
  - Rock The Bells by LL Cool J
  - Dear Yvette by LL Cool J
- I'm Bout It Bout It was interpolated in Bout It 11 by Curren$y
- Internet Going Nutz sampled Still Tippin' by Mike Jones
- Kenny's Dead sampled Freddie's Dead by Curtis Mayfield
- Make 'Em Say Uhh!:
  - sampled Apache by Sugarhill Gang
  - contains an interpolation of the refrain from The Funk Box Party by Masterdon Committee
  - was sampled in The Right Stuff by Girl Talk
  - was interpolated in Be Easy by Wiz Khalifa
- Move Bitch was sampled in:
  - 5th of Remy by AJ McGhee
  - Bodies Hit the Floor by Girl Talk
  - Hoy Me Levanté by Maicol & Manuel
  - Let's Run This by Girl Talk
  - Aus'm Weg by Sido (rapper)
  - Oh No by Girl Talk
- Move Bitch was interpolated in:
  - Random by Lady Sovereign
  - Reckless Driving by J Dilla
  - Soldier by DMX
- Rick Ross included an interpolation of No Limit Soldiers in his song 300 Soldiers

== "The Drum major Pt.1" album ==
Finally KLC's much-anticipated solo project, (The Medicine Men Present) The Drum major Pt.1, was released on March 5, 2021, under label Overdose Empire.

Track listing
1. The Drumamjor
2. I'ont Hide
3. Play It Loud
4. Holla At Me
5. Bang Boogie
6. Break Bread
7. Deep Up Off
8. Soulja Like Me
9. I Got You
10. Hold It Down
11. Where Them Hoes At
12. Do What I Gotta Do
13. In A Minute
14. No Place Like Home
15. Loyalty
16. Duffy

== Other released tracks ==
The following is a list of tracks from KLC's BMI repertoire that have not been affiliated with an album release.

Song title	Ref	Other Artist(s)
92 Bars		Soulja Slim, Dart
Bring It Up		
Child Support		Mo B. Dick, Don Henry
Circle		Skull Duggery
Do What I Gotta Do		Terrence Collins, Odell
Don't Need No		Odell
Hoorrer		
It's All Good		Craig B.
Last Song		Craig B., Odell
My Doggz		Snoop Dogg, Juvenile, 6 Shot
No Limit Gear		2 For 1
Shake Whatcha Mama Gave Ya		Craig B, Mia X, Master P
What To Do		
You Hear That		

== See also ==
- KLC
- Mo B. Dick
- The Medicine Men
- No Limit Records discography
- Sampling
