= No Limit Records discography =

This is a list of albums released by hip-hop label No Limit Records between 1991 and 2006. Founded by American rapper Master P, the label was one of the most commercially successful labels of the 1990s. In 2001, he renamed the label the New No Limit Records.

== Discography ==
=== 1990s ===
==== 1991 ====
- Master P – Get Away Clean

==== 1992 ====
- Master P – Mama's Bad Boy
- TRU – Understanding the Criminal Mind
- E-A-Ski – 1 Step Ahead of Yall

==== 1993 ====
- TRU – Who's Da Killer?
- Sonya C – Married to the Mob

==== 1994 ====
- Master P – The Ghettos Tryin to Kill Me!
- Various Artists – West Coast Bad Boyz, Vol. 1: Anotha Level of the Game
- Lil Ric – Deep N tha Game
- Various Artists – West Coast Bad Boyz: High Fo Xmas

==== 1995 ====
- Dangerous Dame – Escape from the Mental Ward
- Master P – 99 Ways to Die
- TRU – True
- Various Artists – Down South Hustlers: Bouncin' and Swingin'
- Mia X – Good Girl Gone Bad
- Tre-8 – Ghetto Stories

==== 1996 ====
- Master P – Ice Cream Man
- Silkk – The Shocker
- Skull Duggery – Hoodlum Fo' Life
- Kane & Abel – 7 Sins

==== 1997 ====
- Various Artists – West Coast Bad Boyz II
- TRU – Tru 2 da Game
- Steady Mobb'n – Pre-Meditated Drama
- Various Artists – I'm Bout It
- Mia X – Unlady Like
- Mr. Serv-On – Life Insurance
- Master P – Ghetto D
- Mystikal – Unpredictable

==== 1998 ====
- Young Bleed – My Balls and My Word
- Silkk the Shocker – Charge It 2 da Game
- C-Murder – Life or Death
- Various Artists – I Got the Hook Up
- Sons of Funk – The Game of Funk
- Fiend – There's One in Every Family
- Soulja Slim – Give It 2 'Em Raw
- Master P – MP da Last Don
- Kane & Abel – Am I My Brother's Keeper
- Mac – Shell Shocked
- Snoop Dogg – Da Game Is to Be Sold, Not to Be Told
- Big Ed – The Assassin
- Skull Duggery – These Wicked Streets
- Magic – Sky's the Limit
- Various Artists – Mean Green
- Prime Suspects – Guilty 'til Proven Innocent
- Gambino Family – Ghetto Organized
- Mia X – Mama Drama
- Ghetto Commission – Wise Guys
- Steady Mobb'n – Black Mafia
- Full Blooded – Memorial Day
- Various Artists – No Limit Soldiers Compilation: We Can't Be Stopped
- Mystikal – Ghetto Fabulous
- Various Artists – No Limit Soldier Collection

==== 1999 ====
- Silkk the Shocker – Made Man
- Mr. Serv-On – Da Next Level
- C-Murder – Bossalinie
- Various Artists – Foolish
- Mo B. Dick – Gangsta Harmony
- Lil Soldiers – Boot Camp
- Snoop Dogg – No Limit Top Dogg
- Various Artists – Who U Wit?
- TRU – Da Crime Family
- Mercedes – Rear End
- Fiend – Street Life
- Lil Italy – On Top of da World
- Magic – Thuggin'
- Mac – World War III
- Master P – Only God Can Judge Me

=== 2000s ===
==== 2000 ====
- 504 Boyz – Goodfellas
- Mr. Marcelo – Brick Livin'
- C-Murder – Trapped in Crime
- Master P – Ghetto Postage
- Snoop Dogg – Tha Last Meal

==== 2001 ====
- Silkk the Shocker – My World, My Way
- Lil' Romeo – Lil' Romeo
- Soulja Slim – The Streets Made Me
- Krazy – Breather Life
- Master P – Game Face

==== 2002 ====
- Various Artists – West Coast Bad Boyz, Vol. 3: Poppin' Collars
- 504 Boyz – Ballers
- Lil' Romeo – Game Time

==== 2003 ====
- Choppa – Straight from the N.O.
- Magic – White Eyes

==== 2004 ====
- Master P – Good Side, Bad Side
- Silkk the Shocker – Based on a True Story
- Lil' Romeo – Romeoland

==== 2005 ====
- TRU – The Truth
- Master P – Ghetto Bill
- Master P – Remix Classics
- Master P – The Best of Master P
- TRU – The Best of TRU
- Silkk the Shocker – The Best of Silkk the Shocker
- C-Murder – The Best of C-Murder
- 504 Boyz – Hurricane Katrina: We Gon Bounce Back
- Master P – Living Legend: Certified D-Boy

==== 2006 ====
- Master P – America's Most Luved Bad Guy
- Various Artists – No Limit Greatest Hits
- Master P – The Ultimate Master P
- Lil' Romeo – Greatest Hits

== Distribution ==
- In-A-Minute (1991–1994)
- Solar Music Group (1994–1995)
- Priority (1995–2001)
- Universal (2001–2004)
- Koch (2004–2006)
