= No Limit Greatest Hits =

Compilation album by Various artists
- Released: August 1, 2006
- Recorded: 1995–2001
- Genre: Southern hip hop, gangsta rap
- Label: Priority Records
- Producer: The Medicine Men, L. Precise Edwards, Larry D, Master P, Mo B. Dick, KLC, XL, O'Dell, Dez & Charles, Beats By the Pound, Sons Of Funk, Dr. Dre, Michael Elizondo, Full Pack, Hex Luger, Carlos Stephens, Myke Diesel

Professional ratings
Review scores
Source	Rating
AllMusic	4.0/5 stars

No Limit Greatest Hits is a 2006 two-disc greatest hits album released on August 1, 2006, by Priority Records. The compilation managed to make it to #56 on the Top R&B/Hip-Hop Albums chart. Prior to the release of this compilation, No Limit Records went bankrupt in 2003 which resulted in Master P selling the back catalog of the label. Today, EMI owns the No Limit back catalog. Due to no longer owning No Limit, Master P had no involvement in the making of this compilation.

== Critical response ==
David Jeffries of AllMusic believes that the compiling of this album "was obviously done by some real No Limit soldiers who reach well past the big names" and suggests "this is a great snapshot of the label that taught everyone else how to exploit the underground and released some great gangsta music along the way."

== Track listing ==
=== Disc one ===
1. I'm Bout It, Bout It TRU [From The album True]
2. Y'all Ain't Ready Yet Mystikal [From The album Mind of Mystikal]
3. Bounce Dat Azz [Gangsta T, King George, Silkk The Shocker, & Master P [From the album Down South Hustlers: Bouncin' and Swingin']
4. Gangstafied Kane & Abel Featuring Master P and Mo B. Dick] [From the album 7 Sins]
5. The Shocker [Silkk The Shocker Featuring Master P] [From the album The Shocker]
6. Make 'Em Say Uhh! [Master P, Fiend, Silkk The Shocker, Mia X, & Mystikal] [From the album Ghetto D]
7. He Did That [Silkk The Shocker Featuring Master P and Mac] [From the album My World, My Way]
8. Ain't No Limit [Mystikal Featuring Silkk The Shocker] [From the album Unpredictable]
9. Where The Little Souljas At? Lil Soldiers [From the album Boot Camp]
10. Soldier Party [Mac Featuring Master P] [From the album Shell Shocked]
11. No Limit Soldiers II [Master P, C-Murder, Fiend, Magic, Mr. Serv-On, Mia X, Big Ed, Silkk The Shocker, & Mystikal] [From the album We Can't Be Stopped]
12. Whatcha Wanna Do [Mia X] [From the album Mama Drama]
13. Mr. Whomp Whomp [Fiend] [From the album Street Life]
14. NL Party Soulja Slim Featuring Master P, Silkk The Shocker, Full Blooded, Trenitty, Gambino Family, Big Ed, Prime Suspects, Mac, Kane & Abel, Magic, & Snoop Dogg] [From the album Give It 2 'Em Raw]
15. Assassin [Big Ed Featuring Master P] [From the album The Assassin]
16. It's Your Thing Mercedes Featuring Master P] [From the album Rear End]
17. Down 4 My N's [Snoop Dogg, C-Murder, & Magic] [From the album No Limit Top Dogg]

=== Disc two ===
1. It Ain't My Fault [Part 2] [Silkk The Shocker & Mystikal] [From the album Made Man]
2. Hot Boys and Girls [Master P Featuring Mystikal, Silkk The Shocker, Mia X, & Kane & Abel] [From the album MP Da Last Don]
3. Bring It On [Mia X Featuring Fiend, Mystikal, C-Murder, Skull Duggery, & Mac] [From the album Mama Drama]
4. I Miss My Homies [Master P Featuring Pimp C & Silkk The Shocker] [From the album Ghetto D]
5. I Got The Hook-Up! [Master P Featuring Sons of Funk] [From the I Got the Hook Up Soundtrack]
6. Ice On My Wrist [Magic Featuring Master P] [From the album Thuggin']
7. Bitch Please [Snoop Dogg Featuring Xzibit] [From the album No Limit Top Dogg]
8. Hoody Hoo [TRU] [From the album Da Crime Family]
9. Picture U & Me [Mo B. Dick] [From the album Gangsta Harmony]
10. How Ya Do Dat [Master P, Young Bleed, & C-Loc] [From the I'm Bout It Soundtrack]
11. Take My Pain [Fiend Featuring Master P, Silkk The Shocker, & Sons Of Funk] [From the album There's One In Every Family]
12. Like A Jungle [C-Murder] [From the album Bossalinie]
13. Lay Low [Snoop Dogg Featuring Master P, Nate Dogg, Butch Cassidy, & Tha Eastsidaz] [From the album Tha Last Meal]
14. Shake It Like A Dog [Kane & Abel Featuring PNC & 5th Ward Weebie] [From the album Most Wanted]
15. Wobble Wobble 504 Boyz [From the album Goodfellas]
16. My Baby Lil' Romeo [From the album Lil Romeo]
17. That's Cool [Silkk The Shocker Featuring Trina] [From the album My World, My Way]
