= List of No Limit Records artists =

This is a list of artists and producers who were signed to the now-defunct No Limit Records.

== # ==
- 2-4-1 (Two For One)
- 504 Boyz
- 6 Piece

== A ==
- Ace B47
- Afficial

== B ==
- Big Ed (deceased)
- BlaqNmilD

== C ==
- C-Murder (incarcerated)
- Choppa
- Curren$y

== D ==
- D.I.G.

== E ==
- E-A-Ski

== F ==
- Fiend
- Full Blooded

== G ==
- Gambino Family
- Ghetto Commission

== H ==
- Halleluyah

== K ==
- Kane & Abel
- King George
- Krazy

== L ==
- Lil Italy
- Lil Ric
- Lil Soldiers

== M ==
- Mac
- Magic (deceased)
- Marqus Clae
- Master P
- Mercedes
- Mia X
- Mo B. Dick
- Moe Roy
- Money Mafia
- Mr. Marcelo
- Mr. Serv-On
- Mystikal

== P ==
- Play Beezy
- Popeye (deceased)
- Prime Suspects

== R ==
- Romeo Miller
- Rich Boyz

== S ==
- Samm
- Sera Lynn
- Short Circuit
- Silkk the Shocker
- Skull Duggery (deceased)
- Slay Sean
- Snoop Dogg
- Sons of Funk
- Sonya C
- Soulja Slim (deceased)
- Steady Mobb'n

== T ==
- Tre-8 (deceased)
- TRU
- T-Bo Da Firecracker

== X ==
- X-Con

== Y ==
- Young Bleed (deceased)

== Producers ==
- Beats By the Pound
  - KLC
  - Mo B. Dick
  - O'Dell
  - Craig B.
  - Carlos Stephens
  - DJ Daryl
- Myke Diesel
- Donald XL Robertson
- Suga Bear
- Ke'Noe
- Ezell Swang
- DJ Ron
