= Who U Wit? =

Compilation album by Various artists
- Released: May 25, 1999
- Recorded: 1998–99
- Genre: Southern hip hop
- Length: 65:55
- Label: No Limit/Priority
- Producer: Beats By the Pound,(KLC, Mo B. Dick, O'Dell, Craig B. & Carlos Stephens), Meech Wells

No Limit compilation chronology
Foolish (1999)	Who U Wit? (1999)	West Coast Bad Boyz 3 (2001)

Professional ratings
Review scores
Source	Rating
Allmusic	2.5/5 stars

Who U Wit? is a compilation album released from American hip hop record label No Limit Records. It was released on May 25, 1999, and was produced by Beats By the Pound and Meech Wells. This compilation charted much lower than No Limit's previous two compilations, 1998's Mean Green and We Can't Be Stopped, only making it to #62 on the Billboard 200 and #22 on the Top R&B/Hip-Hop Albums.

== Track listing ==
No.	Title	Length
1.	"B-Ball" (Master P)	4:17
2.	"Cold Wit It" (Fiend)	2:44
3.	"Give Me the Rock" (Ghetto Commission)	3:31
4.	"You Ain't a Baller" (Magic)	4:28
5.	"B-Ballin on My Block" (C-Murder)	3:45
6.	"Hoop Dreams" (Snoop Dogg)	3:48
7.	"Such a Bad Girl" (Mia X)	3:51
8.	"Put Me in tha Game" (Mac)	3:16
9.	"I'm Hot" (Big Ed)	3:12
10.	"Smash and Ball" (Mr. Serv-On)	4:17
11.	"It Ain't My Fault, Pt. 2" (Silkk the Shocker & Mystikal)	3:25
12.	"Shake 'Em Off" (Reginelli & Pheno of Gambino Family)	2:20
13.	"Bring It 2 U" (Lil Soldiers & Short Circuit)	3:04
14.	"Pass the Ball" (2 for 1)	2:43
15.	"Woof!" (Snoop Dogg, Mystikal & Fiend)	4:30
16.	"B-Ball" (Master P)	4:17
17.	"B-Ball" ([Instrumental with Hook])	4:13
18.	"Ball" ([Instrumental without Hook])	4:10
