= Rise to Power (Kane & Abel album) =

Studio album by Kane & Abel
- Released: September 21, 1999
- Recorded: 1999
- Genres: Southern hip hop, gangsta rap
- Label: [[Most Wanted Empire Records|Most Wanted Empire|Elektra
- Producers: Kane & Abel

Kane & Abel chronology
Am I My Brother's Keeper (1998)	Rise to Power (1999)	Most Wanted (2000)

Professional ratings
Review scores
Source	Rating
AllMusic	2.5/5 stars
Dayton Daily News	C−

Rise to Power is the fourth studio album by Kane & Abel. It was released on September 21, 1999, via Most Wanted Empire and Elektra Records, and was produced by the duo. The album addresses their then-recent federal indictment for cocaine possession.

The album peaked at No. 61 on the Billboard 200. It made it to No. 11 on the Top R&B/Hip-Hop Albums chart, but was not as successful as the group's previous album, Am I My Brother's Keeper. As of 2004, Rise to Power had sold over 115,000 copies.

== Critical reception ==
CMJ New Music Report praised the album, writing that "the beats are incredible, comprised of thick chunks of intergalactic Moog funk." Vibe gave the album a negative review, commenting that the duo were unable to "recapture their glory days as part of Master P's camp."

Rolling Stone wrote: "Funkified guitar riffs and percussion strokes transcend Kane and Abel's merely adequate verbal jousting, making Rise to Power a decent CD that could have been exceptional had the lyrics been as soul-stirring as the beats." USA Today listed it as the fifth worst R&B album of 1999.

== Track listing ==
1. "Parental Advisory" – :23
2. "Rise to Power (Illegal Business)" – 2:51
3. "The Possibility" – 3:40
4. "Tony Manteca I" – :45
5. "Get Cha Weight Up" – 3:01 (feat. Boss Player & Ghinn)
6. "Beat It Up" – 3:59 (feat. Skandalust)
7. "Straight Thuggin'" – 3:51 (feat. Twista & Solé)
8. "Get Cha Mind Right" – 3:39
9. "Tony Manteca II" – :26
10. "I Don't Care" – 4:37 (feat. Aaron Hall)
11. "Let 'Em Come" – 3:47 (feat. The Medicine Men & Lunatic)
12. "State's Evidence" – 3:26 (feat. Boss Player, Ghinn, Skandalus & Tommy Two Face)
13. "Let Them Hands Go" – 3:12
14. "Show Me What Cha Workin' Wit" – 3:44
15. "This Life" – 4:04
16. "Lock Me Up" – 1:12
17. "Hit the Block" – 3:15
18. "Hydroponix" – 4:20 (feat. Dion Marshall)
19. "Brave N's" – 3:39
20. "Joke's on You Jack" – :11
21. "Get Cha Mind Right" (Spanish Version) – 3:42 (feat. Boss Player & Ghinn)
