= The Medicine Men =

American hip-hop group

- Origin: New Orleans, Louisiana, U.S.
- Genres: Southern hip-hop; hip-hop soul; jazz rap; R&B
- Occupations: Record producers Songwriters
- Years active: 1995—present
- Labels: BBTP Music; No Limit/Priority/EMI; Overdose; Tommy Boy/Warner Bros.; Asylum/Elektra
- Members: KLC; Mo B. Dick; Craig B; Odell; Carlos Stephens
- Past members: Tre-8 RIP

The Medicine Men (formerly Beats by the Pound) are a New Orleans, Louisiana-based American music production team made up of KLC, Mo B. Dick, Craig B, Odell and Carlos Stephens.

The collective helped sell 30 million records for Master P's No Limit Records, from 1995 to 1999, as well the majority of releases from No Limit Records during the days it was distributed by Priority Records/EMI. They would later receive nomination for Producers of the Year and collectively be voted as one of Hip-Hop's "Thirty Most Powerful People" by The Source in 1999. From 1995 to 1999 many of The Medicine Men productions featured hooks from Mo B. Dick or Odell Vickers credited as a featured artist.

== Singles produced ==
List of singles produced, with selected chart positions and certifications, showing year released and album name
Title	Year	Peak chart positions			Certifications	Album
Title	Year	US	US R&B	US Rap	Certifications	Album
"I'm Bout' It, Bout It" (TRU featuring Master P & Mia X)	1995	—	—	—		True
"Mobbin Through My Hood" (TRU featuring Big Ed & King George)	1995	—	—	—		True
"Playaz from the South" (Master P, Silkk & UGK)	1995	—	—	—		Down South Hustlers: Bouncin' and Swingin'
"Bounce That Azz" (Master P, Gangsta T, King George & Silkk)	1995	—	—	—		Down South Hustlers: Bouncin' and Swingin'
"Wanna Be With You" (Mia X)	1995	—	—	—		Good Girl Gone Bad
"Mr. Ice Cream Man" (Master P featuring Silkk)	1996	90	55	12		Ice Cream Man
"No More Tears" (Master P featuring Silkk and Mo B. Dick)	1996	—	78	15		Ice Cream Man
"The Shocker" (Silkk featuring Master P)	1996	—	—	—		The Shocker
"Gangstafied" (Kane & Abel featuring Master P & Mo B. Dick)	1996	—	—	—		7 Sins
"I Always Feel Like" (TRU featuring Mia X & Mo B. Dick)	1997	71	27	11		Tru 2 da Game
"My Best Friend " (Mr. Serv-On featuring Master P)	1997	—	—	—		Life Insurance
"Ain't No Limit" (Mystikal featuring Silkk the Shocker)	1997	—	63	—		Unpredictable
"R.I.P. Tupac" (Master P)	1997	—	—	—		West Coast Bad Boyz II
"Is There a Heaven 4 a Gangsta?" (Master P)	1997	—	—	—		Rhyme & Reason: Music from the Motion Picture
"6 in the Mornin'" (Master P)	1997	—	—	—		In tha Beginning...There Was Rap
"Scream" (Master P featuring Silkk the Shocker)	1997	—	—	—		Scream 2: Music from the Motion Picture
"The Party Don't Stop" (Mia X featuring Master P and Foxy Brown)	1997	—	—	—		Unlady Like
"I Miss My Homies" (Master P featuring Pimp C and Silkk the Shocker)	1997	25	16	1	RIAA: Gold	Ghetto D
"If I Could Change" (Master P, Steady Mobb'n, Mia X, Mo B. Dick & O'Dell)	1997	48	23	7		I'm Bout It: Music from the Motion Picture
"Pushin' Inside You" (Sons of Funk)	1997	97	—	—		I'm Bout It: Music from the Motion Picture & The Game of Funk
"I Got the Hook Up!" (Master P featuring Sons of Funk)	1998	16	11	1	RIAA: Gold	I Got the Hook Up: Music from the Motion Picture/The Game of Funk
"Make 'Em Say Uhh!" (Master P featuring Silkk the Shocker, Mia X, Fiend & Mystikal)	1998	16	18	6	RIAA: Platinum	Ghetto D
"Kenny's Dead" (Master P)	1998	—	—	—		Chef Aid: The South Park Album
"Thinkin' Bout U" (Master P featuring Mia X and Mo B. Dick)	1998	—	—	—		MP da Last Don
"How Ya Do Dat" (Master P & Young Bleed featuring C-Loc)	1998	—	29	—		I'm Bout It: Music from the Motion Picture & My Balls and My Word
"Times So Hard" (Young Bleed featuring Master P, Fiend, Mo B. Dick and O'Dell)	1998	—	—	—		My Balls and My Word
"Just Be Straight with Me" (Silkk the Shocker featuring Master P and Destiny's Child)	1998	57	36	12		Charge It 2 da Game
"It Ain't My Fault" (Silkk the Shocker featuring Mystikal)	1998	18	5	1		Charge It 2 da Game
"Give Me The World"	1998	—	—	—		Charge It 2 da Game
"Express Yourself" (Silkk the Shocker featuring O'Dell)	1998	—	—	43		Straight Outta Compton: N.W.A 10th Anniversary Tribute
"A 2nd Chance" (C-Murder featuring Mo B. Dick, Master P & Silkk the Shocker)	1998	—	—	—		Life or Death
"Making Moves" (C-Murder featuring Master P & Mo B. Dick)	1998	—	—	—		Life or Death
"Sons Reasons" (Sons of Funk)	1998	—	—	—		The Game of Funk
"Take My Pain" (Fiend featuring Master P, Silkk The Shocker & Sons of Funk)	1998	—	11	—		There's One in Every Family
"From What I Was Told" (Soulja Slim)	1998	—	—	—		I Got the Hook Up: Music from the Motion Picture & Give It 2 'Em Raw
"Street Life" (Soulja Slim featuring Master P, Silkk The Shocker & O'Dell)	1998	—	—	—		Give It 2 'Em Raw
"Time After Time" (Kane & Abel featuring Master P & O'Dell)	1998	—	—	18		Am I My Brother's Keeper
"Boss Chick" (Mac featuring Mia X)	1998	—	—	—		Shell Shocked
"Liquidation Of The Ghetto" (Prime Suspects featuring Mystikal, O'Dell and Ms. Peaches)	1998	—	—	—		Guilty 'til Proven Innocent
"Studio B" (Gambino Family featuring Snoop Dogg & Mo B. Dick)	1998	—	—	—		Ghetto Organized
"Childhood Years" (Gambino Family featuring C-Murder & Porsha)	1998	—	—	—		Ghetto Organized
"What'cha Wanna Do?" (Mia X featuring Charlie Wilson)	1998	12	10	3		Mama Drama
"Imma Shine" (Mia X)	1998	20	17	6		Mama Drama
"I'm a Soulja" (Ghetto Commission featuring Master P and Mystikal)	1998	—	—	—		Wise Guys
"Ghetto Life" (Steady Mobb'n featuring Snoop Dogg)	1998	—	—	—		Black Mafia
"The Quickest Way To Die" (Full Blooded featuring Mo B. Dick & The Hounds of Gert Town)	1998	—	—	—		Memorial Day
"Close 2 You" (Lil Soldiers featuring Mo B. Dick)	1998	—	—	—		Mean Green: Major Players Compilation & Boot Camp
"Where the Little Souljas At?" (Lil Soldiers)	1998	—	—	—		We Can't Be Stopped & Boot Camp
"Ghetto Fame" (Lil Italy featuring Silkk The Shocker)	1998	—	—	—		On Top of da World
"Woof" (Snoop Dogg featuring Fiend & Mystikal)	1999	62	31	—		Da Game Is to Be Sold, Not to Be Told
"That's the Nigga" (Mystikal)	1999	—	60	—		Ghetto Fabulous
"Light It Up" (The No Limit All Stars)	1999	—	—	—		Light It Up: Music from the Motion Picture
"It Ain't My Fault, It Ain't My Fault Pt. 2" (Silkk the Shocker featuring Mystikal)	1999	13	4	1		Made Man
"Somebody Like Me" (Silkk the Shocker featuring Mýa)	1999	57	43	1		Made Man
"Ghetto Rain" (Silkk the Shocker featuring Master P & O'Dell)	1999	—	—	—		Made Man
"From N.Y. To N.O." (Mr. Serv-On featuring Big Pun)	1999	—	—	—		Da Next Level
"Like A Jungle" (C-Murder)	1999	—	—	—		Bossalinie
"I Remember" (C-Murder featuring Magic & Porsha)	1999	—	—	—		Bossalinie
"Nothing Stays The Same" (O'Dell & Porsha)	1999	—	—	—		Foolish: Music from the Motion Picture
"Foolish" (Master P, Magic & Mo B. Dick)	1999	—	—	—		Foolish: Music from the Motion Picture
"Shoot' m up Movies" (Mo B. Dick)	1999	—	—	—		Gangsta Harmony
"Hoody Hooo" (TRU)	1999	—	31	—		Da Crime Family
"Tru Homies" (TRU featuring O'Dell)	1999	—	—	—		Da Crime Family
"It's Your Thing" (Mercedes featuring Master P)	1999	71	12	4		Rear End
"N's Ain't Shit" (Mercedes featuring Mia X)	1999	—	—	—		Rear End
"Mr. Whomp Whomp" (Fiend)	1999	—	—	—		Street Life
"Talk It How I Bring It" (Fiend)	1999	—	—	—		Street Life
"Hot Boys and Girls" (Master P featuring Mystikal, Mia X, Silkk the Shocker and Kane & Abel)	1999	—	87	—		MP da Last Don
"Make 'Em Say Uhh! #2" (Master P featuring Fiend, Snoop Dogg, Mia X and Silkk The Shocker)	1999	19	13	—		MP da Last Don
"Goodbye to My Homies" (Master P featuring Mo B. Dick, Sons of Funk and Silkk the Shocker)	1999	27	38	5		MP da Last Don
"Thug Girl" (Master P featuring Snoop Dogg and Silkk the Shocker)	1999	—	—	—		MP da Last Don

== Other production ==
Artist(s)	Year	Album
TRU	1995	True
Tre-8	1995	Ghetto Stories
Mia X	1995	Good Girl Gone Bad
Master P	1996	Ice Cream Man
Silkk the Shocker	1996	The Shocker
Various Artists	1996	The Substitute (soundtrack)
Skull Duggrey	1996	Hoodlum fo' Life
Kane & Abel	1996	7 Sins
Various artists	1997	West Coast Bad Boyz II
Various artists	1997	Rhyme & Reason (soundtrack)
Various artists	1997	Nothing to Lose (soundtrack)
TRU	1997	Tru 2 da Game
Various Artists	1997	In tha Beginning...There Was Rap
Young Bleed	1998	My Balls and My Word
Destiny's Child	1998	Destiny's Child
Silkk the Shocker	1998	Charge It 2 da Game
C-Murder	1998	Life or Death
Various artists	1998	Ride (soundtrack)
Various artists	1998	I Got the Hook-Up
Various artists	1998	The Players Club (soundtrack)
Sons of Funk	1998	The Game of Funk
Montell Jordan	1998	Let's Ride
Fiend	1998	There's One in Every Family
Soulja Slim	1998	Give It 2 'Em Raw
Master P	1998	MP da Last Don
Kane & Abel	1998	Am I My Brother's Keeper
Mac	1998	Shell Shocked
Snoop Dogg	1998	Da Game Is to Be Sold, Not to Be Told
Big Ed the Assassin	1998	The Assassin
Skull Duggery	1998	These Wicked Streets
Magic	1998	Sky's the Limit
Various artists	1998	Mean Green
Prime Suspects	1998	Guilty 'til Proven Innocent
Gambino Family	1998	Ghetto Organized
Mia X	1998	Mama Drama
Ghetto Commission	1998	Wise Guys
Steady Mobb'n	1998	Black Mafia
Full Blooded	1998	Memorial Day
Various artists	1998	Straight Outta Compton (10th Anniversary Edition)
Various artists	1998	We Can't Be Stopped
Mystikal	1998	Ghetto Fabulous
Silkk the Shocker	1999	Made Man
Mr. Serv-On	1999	Da Next Level
C-Murder	1999	Bossalinie
Various artists	1999	Foolish
Mo B. Dick	1999	Gangsta Harmony
Lil Soldiers	1999	Boot Camp
Snoop Dogg	1999	No Limit Top Dogg
Various artists	1999	Who U Wit?
Various artists	1999	Light It Up (soundtrack)
TRU	1999	Da Crime Family
Mariah Carey	1999	Rainbow (Mariah Carey album)
Mercedes	1999	Rear End
Fiend	1999	Street Life
Lil Italy	1999	On Top of da World
Magic	1999	Thuggin'
Mystikal	2000	Let's Get Ready
Mystikal	2001	Tarantula

== Members ==
Current members

- KLC (1995–present)
- Mo B. Dick (1995–present)
- Craig B (1996–present)
- O'Dell (1997–present)
- Carlos Stephens (1995–present)
- Tre-8 (1995)
