= Am I My Brother's Keeper =

Am I My Brothers Keeper

Studio album by Kane & Abel
- Released: July 7, 1998
- Recorded: 1997–1998
- Genres: Southern hip-hop; gangsta rap
- Length: 1:19:16
- Labels: No Limit; Priority
- Producers: Carlos; Craig B.; KLC; Master P; Mo B. Dick; O'Dell; Sons of Funk

Kane & Abel chronology
The 7 Sins (1996)	Am I My Brothers Keeper (1998)	Rise to Power (1999)

Singles from Am I My Brothers Keeper
- 1. "Time After Time" Released: 1998

Professional ratings
Review scores
Source	Rating
AllMusic	2.5/5 stars
Los Angeles Times	1/4 stars

Am I My Brothers Keeper is the third studio album by American hip-hop duo Kane & Abel. It was released on July 14, 1998, via No Limit/Priority Records, marking their second and final album for the label. Produced by Beats by the Pound, it features guest appearances from Master P, Silkk the Shocker, Snoop Dogg, Mystikal, Soulja Slim, C-Murder, Fiend, Big Ed, Full Blooded, Mac, Magic, Mia X, Mr. Serv-On, Prime Suspects, O'Dell, Araina, Dion Marshall and Sons of Funk.

In the United States, the album debuted at number 5 on the Billboard 200 and atop the Top R&B/Hip-Hop Albums charts. It was certified gold by the Recording Industry Association of America on August 15, 1998, for selling 500,000 copies in the US alone. An accompanying music video was released for the lead single, "Time After Time".

== Track listing ==
No.	Title	Writer(s)	Producer(s)	Length
1.	"Time After Time"	Daniel Garcia; David Garcia; Percy Miller	Carlos; O'Dell; KLC	4:11
2.	"This Is for the Smokers"	Daniel Garcia; David Garcia	Carlos	2:27
3.	"Tryin 2 Have Sumthin'"	Daniel Garcia; David Garcia; P. Miller; Richard Jones	Master P	4:18
4.	"Soldier Story"	Daniel Garcia; David Garcia	Carlos	4:57
5.	"Throw Them Thangs"	Daniel Garcia; David Garcia; Awood Johnson	KLC	3:16
6.	"Out of Town B's"	Daniel Garcia; David Garcia; Calvin Broadus	KLC	3:52
7.	"Ghetto Day"	Daniel Garcia; David Garcia	Craig B.	2:59
8.	"Stress"	Daniel Garcia; David Garcia	O'Dell	3:57
9.	"We Don't Care"	Daniel Garcia; David Garcia	Carlos	2:26
10.	"The Game"	Daniel Garcia; David Garcia	Mo B. Dick	3:48
11.	"Watch Me"	Daniel Garcia; David Garcia; Vyshonn Miller; Michael Tyler; James Tapp	KLC	4:09
12.	"Only God Knows"	Daniel Garcia; David Garcia	KLC	2:48
13.	"Call Me When You Need Some"	Daniel Garcia; David Garcia; V. Miller; P. Miller	Sons of Funk	3:09
14.	"No Limit N...'s"	Daniel Garcia; David Garcia; Corey Miller; Jones	Craig B.	3:25
15.	"Bout That Combat"	Daniel Garcia; David Garcia; Tapp; Gary Williams	KLC	3:14
16.	"No Turnin Back"	Daniel Garcia; David Garcia	O'Dell	3:41
17.	"Betta Kill Me"	Daniel Garcia; David Garcia	Craig B.; KLC	3:44
18.	"My Hood to Yo Hood"	Daniel Garcia; David Garcia	KLC	2:49
19.	"Am I My Brothers Keeper"	Daniel Garcia; David Garcia	KLC	1:14
20.	"Gangstafied Forever"	Daniel Garcia; David Garcia; V. Miller; Corey Smith	Craig B.	3:34
21.	"Let's Go Get Em"	Daniel Garcia; David Garcia; McKinley Phipps; Jones; Tapp; Edward Lee Knight; Mia Young; Tyler	KLC	3:13
22.	"Greens, Cornbread & Cabbage"	Daniel Garcia; David Garcia; P. Miller; Prime Suspects	KLC	5:38
23.	"I Ain't Runnin"	Daniel Garcia; David Garcia; C. Miller	Carlos	2:27
Total length:				1:19:16

Sample credits

- Track 1 contains an interpolation of "Time After Time" by Cyndi Lauper.
- Track 4 contains an interpolation of "Soulja's Story" by 2Pac.
- Track 13 contains an interpolation of "Tender Love" by Force MDs.

== Personnel ==
- David "Abel" Garcia – vocals
- Daniel "Kane" Garcia – vocals
- Percy "Master P" Miller – vocals (tracks: 1, 3, 13, 22), producer (track 3), executive producer
- Richard "Fiend" Jones – vocals (tracks: 3, 14, 21)
- Awood "Magic" Johnson Jr. – vocals (track 5)
- Calvin "Snoop Dogg" Broadus – vocals (track 6)
- Vyshonn "Silkk the Shocker" Miller – vocals (tracks: 11, 13, 20)
- Michael "Mystikal" Tyler – vocals (tracks: 11, 21)
- James "Soulja Slim" Tapp Jr. – vocals (tracks: 11, 15, 21)
- Corey "C-Murder" Miller – vocals (tracks: 14, 23)
- Gary "Full Blooded" Williams – vocals (track 15)
- Corey "Mr. Serv-On" Smith – vocals (track 20)
- McKinley "Mac" Phipps Jr. – vocals (track 21)
- Edward Lee "Big Ed" Knight – vocals (track 21)
- Mia "Mia X" Young – vocals (track 21)
- Prime Suspects – vocals (track 22)
- O'Dell Vickers Jr. – additional vocals (tracks: 1, 12, 20), producer (tracks: 1, 8, 16)
- Dion Marshall – additional vocals (track 7)
- Sons of Funk – additional vocals & producers (track 13)
- Araina – additional vocals (track 20)
- Carlos Stephens – producer (tracks: 1, 2, 4, 9, 23)
- Craig S. "KLC" Lawson – producer (tracks: 1, 5, 6, 11, 12, 15, 17–19, 21, 11)
- Craig Bazile – producer (tracks: 7, 14, 17, 20)
- Raymond "Mo B. Dick" Poole – producer (track 10)
- Pen & Pixel – front cover art
- Duffy Rich – A&R coordinator

== Charts ==
Chart (1998)	Peak position
US Billboard 200	5
US Top R&B/Hip-Hop Albums (Billboard)	1

== Certifications ==
Region	Certification	Certified units/sales
United States (RIAA)	Gold	500,000^{^}
^{^} Shipments figures based on certification alone.

== See also ==
- List of Billboard number-one R&B albums of 1998
