= Wise Guys (album) =

Studio album by Ghetto Commission
- Released: November 10, 1998
- Recorded: 1998
- Genre: Southern hip hop; gangsta rap
- Length: 1:10:59
- Label: No Limit; Priority
- Producer: Master P (exec.); Beats by the Pound

Professional ratings
Review scores
Source	Rating
AllMusic	3/5 stars

Wise Guys is the only studio album by American Southern hip hop group Ghetto Commission. It was released on November 10, 1998, via No Limit/Priority Records. The production was handled by Beats by the Pound, with Master P serving as executive producer. It features guest appearances from Fiend, Magic, Master P, C-Murder, Mac, Mr. Serv-On, Mystikal, Prime Suspects, QB and Silkk the Shocker. The album peaked at number 59 on the Billboard 200 and number 12 on the Top R&B/Hip-Hop Albums chart.

== Track listing ==
No.	Title	Writer(s)	Producer(s)	Length
1.	"I'm a Soulja" (featuring Master P and Mystikal)	Dwayne Lawrence; Gary Arnold; Walter Valerio; Byron Dolliolie; Percy Miller; Michael Tyler; John Francis Bongiovi Jr.; Richard Stephen Sambora	Carlos Stephens; O'Dell	4:37
2.	"Get 'Em Up" (featuring Prime Suspects and Fiend)	Lawrence; Arnold; Valerio; Dolliolie; Tayari Herrera; Damien Dixon; Ernest Espradron; Richard Jones	KLC	4:15
3.	"Thug 'Til I Die" (featuring Master P)	Lawrence; Arnold; Valerio; Dolliolie; P. Miller	O'Dell	4:34
4.	"Hustla Baller"	Lawrence; Arnold; Valerio; Dolliolie	Carlos Stephens	3:45
5.	"How Could You Blame Us" (featuring Fiend)	Lawrence; Arnold; Valerio; Dolliolie; Jones	Carlos Stephens	3:50
6.	"Run Quickly"	Lawrence; Arnold; Valerio; Dolliolie	Carlos Stephens	3:24
7.	"Blood Line" (featuring Magic)	Lawrence; Arnold; Valerio; Dolliolie; Awood Johnson Jr.	Carlos Stephens	4:50
8.	"These Eyes of Mine"	Lawrence; Arnold; Valerio; Dolliolie	O'Dell	4:15
9.	"Trying to Make It" (featuring Mr. Serv-On)	Lawrence; Arnold; Valerio; Dolliolie; Corey Smith	Carlos Stephens	4:30
10.	"Devil's Playground"	Lawrence; Arnold; Valerio; Dolliolie	Carlos Stephens	4:18
11.	"Lost Thugs" (featuring C-Murder)	Lawrence; Arnold; Valerio; Dolliolie; Corey Miller	O'Dell; KLC	4:27
12.	"Ghost in the Dark"	Lawrence; Arnold; Valerio; Dolliolie	Carlos Stephens	2:41
13.	"Wise Guys"	Lawrence; Arnold; Valerio; Dolliolie	Carlos Stephens	3:36
14.	"Trying to Change" (featuring Silkk the Shocker)	Lawrence; Arnold; Valerio; Dolliolie; Vyshonn King Miller; Keith Sweat; Teddy Riley; James Hamish Stuart; Patrick Anson Doheny	Carlos Stephens	5:12
15.	"Shackled"	Lawrence; Arnold; Valerio; Dolliolie	Carlos Stephens	3:47
16.	"Our Thing" (featuring Magic, QB and Mac)	Lawrence; Arnold; Valerio; Dolliolie; Johnson Jr.; Q.B.; McKinley Phipps Jr.	Craig B.	3:43
17.	"Bad Weather"	Lawrence; Arnold; Valerio; Dolliolie	Craig B.	1:55
18.	"Thug Luv"	Lawrence; Arnold; Valerio; Dolliolie; Lawrence Smith; Jalil Hutchins	Carlos Stephens	3:20
Total length:				1:10:59

== Charts ==
Chart (1998)	Peak position
US Billboard 200	59
US Top R&B/Hip-Hop Albums (Billboard)	12
