= AKZ =

AKZ may refer to:

- Alabama language (ISO language code "akz")
- "AKZ", a song from the Kane & Abel album Most Wanted
- AKZ Ararat Cognac Factory, an enterprise in Ararat, Armenia
