= Foolish (soundtrack) =

Foolish (Original Motion Picture Soundtrack)

Soundtrack album to Foolish by various artists
- Released: March 23, 1999
- Recorded: June 1998–March 1999
- Genre: Hip-hop
- Length: 1:09:44
- Labels: No Limit; Priority
- Producers: Carlos Stephens; Craig B.; KLC; L.T. Hutton; Mark In The Dark; M.P.; O'Dell; Supreme Nyborn; The Whole 9

No Limit soundtracks chronology
I Got The Hook-Up! (1998)	Foolish (Original Motion Picture Soundtrack) (1999)

Professional ratings
Review scores
Source	Rating
AllMusic	2.5/5 stars

Foolish (Original Motion Picture Soundtrack) is the soundtrack album to Dave Meyers' 1999 comedy drama film Foolish. It was released on March 23, 1999, via No Limit/Priority Records. Production was handled by Carlos Stephens, Craig B., KLC, L.T. Hutton, Mark in the Dark, M.P., O'Dell, Supreme Nyborn and the Whole 9, with Master P serving as executive producer. It features contributions from the film star Master P and his labelmates and affiliates C-Murder, Crooked Eye, Fiend, Ghetto Commission, Kane & Abel, Lil' Soldiers, Magic, Mia X, Mo B. Dick, Mr. Serv-On, Mystikal, O'Dell, Porsha, Silkk the Shocker and Tha Dogg Pound, as well as Marvin Gaye, Kool & the Gang, Parliament and The O'Jays.

The soundtrack proved to be fairly successful, debuting at number 32 on the Billboard 200 and number 10 on the Top R&B/Hip-Hop Albums charts in the United States. It was certified gold by the Recording Industry Association of America on April 27, 1999, for shipment of over 500,000 copies in the US alone. It was supported with three promotional singles: "Like a Jungle", "Foolish" and "Nothing Stays the Same".

== Track listing ==
No.	Title	Writer(s)	Producer(s)	Length
1.	"Foolish" (performed by Master P, Mo B. Dick & Magic)	Percy Miller; Raymond Poole; Awood Johnson Jr.; Keith Sweat; Teddy Riley	Craig B.; O'Dell	4:05
2.	"Nothing Stays the Same" (performed by O'Dell & Porsha)	Odell Vickers Jr.; Keryl Jean Watkins	O'Dell	5:21
3.	"Don't Be Foolish" (performed by Tha Dogg Pound)	Calvin Broadus; Delmar Arnaud; Ricardo Brown	Mark In The Dark	4:11
4.	"They Don't Hear Me" (performed by Fiend)	Richard Jones	KLC	2:27
5.	"Let's Get It On" (performed by Marvin Gaye)	Marvin Gaye; Ed Townsend		4:00
6.	"School on Lock" (performed by Lil' Soldiers)	Ikeim; Freequan	Supreme Nyborn	3:21
7.	"Get Yo Mob On" (performed by Crooked Eye)	Aaron Edmand	Craig B.	2:51
8.	"Like a Jungle" (performed by C-Murder)	Corey Miller	M.P.	3:29
9.	"Whatchanogood" (performed by Mia X)	Mia Young	Craig B.	4:59
10.	"For the Love of Money" (performed by The O'Jays)	Anthony Jackson; Kenneth Gamble; Leon Huff		7:14
11.	"For Money" (performed by Silkk the Shocker)	Vyshonn Miller; John E. Rhone; Ontario Haynes	The Whole 9	3:43
12.	"Jungle Boogie" (performed by Kool & the Gang)	Robert Bell; Ronald Bell; Claydes Charles Smith; Dennis Thomas; Donald Boyce; George Brown; Richard Westfield; Robert Mickens		3:05
13.	"Runnin' from the Police" (performed by C-Murder)	C. Miller	Mark In The Dark	3:08
14.	"That's That Shit" (performed by Mystikal)	Michael Tyler	L.T. Hutton	3:41
15.	"Nigga" (performed by Ghetto Commission)	Dwayne Lawrence; Gary Arnold; Walter Valerio; Byron Dolliolie	Carlos Stephens	3:31
16.	"Put 'Em Up" (performed by Mr. Serv-On)	Corey Smith	Craig B.	2:57
17.	"Yes Indeed" (performed by Kane & Abel)	Daniel Garcia; David Garcia	KLC	3:16
18.	"Aqua Boogie (A Psychoalphadiscobetabioaquadoloop)" (performed by Parliament)	George Clinton Jr.; William Collins; Bernard G. Worrell		4:25
Total length:				1:09:44

Notes

- Track 4 later appeared in Street Life.
- Track 5 is taken from Let's Get It On.
- Track 6 later appeared in Boot Camp.
- Track 8 is taken from Bossalinie.
- Track 10 is taken from Ship Ahoy.
- Track 12 is taken from Wild and Peaceful.
- Track 18 is taken from Motor Booty Affair.

== Charts ==
Chart performance for Foolish
Chart (1999)	Peak position
US Billboard 200	32
US Top R&B/Hip-Hop Albums (Billboard)	10

== Certifications ==
Region	Certification	Certified units/sales
United States (RIAA)	Gold	500,000^{^}
^{^} Shipments figures based on certification alone.
