= Welcome Home (Kane & Abel album) =

Studio album by Kane & Abel
- Released: July 22, 2003
- Recorded: 2002–2003
- Genre: Southern hip hop, gangsta rap
- Label: Most Wanted Empire
- Producer: Kane & Abel, Howard "Chaotic" Metoyer, Sinista

Kane & Abel chronology
The Last Ones Left (2002)	Welcome Home (2003)	Street Legends (2004)

Welcome Home is the seventh album by Kane & Abel. It was released on July 22, 2003 for Most Wanted Empire and featured production from Kane & Abel, Howard "Chaotic" Metoyer and Sinista. The album was released after the brothers were released from prison and reached No. 75 on the Billboard Top R&B/Hip-Hop Albums chart. The single, "All Good", featuring Big Ramp, peaked at No. 31 on the Rap Singles chart.

== Track listing ==
1. "Money and Power"- 0:41
2. "Welcome Home"- 3:35 (feat. Big Ramp)
3. "Do It"- 4:01 (feat. Box)
4. "Toot It Up"- 3:13 (feat. 5th Ward Weebie & Hotboy Ronald)
5. "Still Got Love"- 4:17
6. "All Good"- 4:49 (feat. Big Ramp)
7. "Ciagra"- 0:58
8. "Walk Like a Model"- 4:06
9. "Be Right There"- 3:25 (feat. Jan of US3)
10. "Whatcha Hollarin'"- 3:47
11. "Armed Robbery"- 2:56 (feat. Box)
12. "Real"- 3:35 (feat. Big Ramp)
13. "Smokin' Joe"- 1:20
14. "Ride Chrome"- 3:59 (feat. Box, Slim Reaper, Young Biz & Delvin)
15. "She Wanna"- 3:41 (feat. Big Ramp)
16. "Get Money"- 3:55 (feat. Box)
17. "Public Service Announcement"- 0:57
