= My Balls and My Word =

Studio album by Young Bleed
- Released: January 20, 1998
- Recorded: 1996–1997
- Genres: Southern hip hop; gangsta rap
- Length: 57:19
- Labels: No Limit; Priority
- Producers: Beats by the Pound; Happy Perez; Pimp C

Young Bleed chronology
My Balls and My Word (1998)	My Own (1999)

My Balls and My Word is the debut studio album by American rapper Young Bleed. It was released on January 20, 1998, through No Limit/Priority Records. The production was handled by Happy Perez and Beats by the Pound, with Master P and C-Loc serving as executive producers. It features guest appearances from Lay-Lo, C-Loc, Master P, Lee Tyme, Lucky Knuckles, Fiend and Mystikal. The album was a success, reaching number 10 on the Billboard 200 and topping the Top R&B/Hip-Hop Albums. In March 1998, the album was certified gold by the Recording Industry Association of America.

== Critical reception ==
Professional ratings
Review scores
Source	Rating
AllMusic	3/5 stars
Chicago Tribune	3.5/4 stars
RapReviews	7/10
The Source	3.5/5 stars

Soren Baker, writing for Chicago Tribune, said that "Young Bleed subtly and gently mocks the stereotype of laid-back Southerners." The journalist highlighted "Thick Bass Lines", "rapid drum loops", and Young Bleed's vocal performance. Stephen Thomas Erlewine of AllMusic thought My Balls and My Word was a "conventional late-'90s gangsta record", criticizing it for its lack of originality. Steve Juon of RapReviews viewed it as the label's compilation album, but believed that Young Bleed "elevates it substantially". Similarly, Elliott Wilson of The Source magazine thought it was "more a family affair than a solo release", but believed that the rapper "fails to carry the weight without his friends". He commended the production, noting "slinky basslines, swirling keyboards and eerie strings".

== Track listing ==
No.	Title	Producer(s)	Length
1.	"Keep It Real" (featuring C-Loc and Master P)	Happy Perez; KLC	4:15
2.	"Bring the Noise" (featuring Master P and Mystikal)	KLC; Mo B. Dick; Craig B.; Pimp C	3:30
3.	"An Offer U Can't Refuse"	Happy Perez	1:13
4.	"The Day They Make Me Boss"	Happy Perez	5:10
5.	"Mo Money" (featuring Lay-Lo and Lucky Knuckles)	O'Dell	3:37
6.	"Pull It Off" (featuring C-Loc, Lay-Lo, Lee Tyme and Lucky Knuckles)	Happy Perez	4:53
7.	"Times So Hard" (featuring Master P, Fiend, Mo B. Dick and O'Dell)	Mo B. Dick	3:58
8.	"How Ya Do That" (featuring Master P and C-Loc)	Happy Perez; KLC	4:31
9.	"Better Than Last Time" (featuring C-Loc and Max Minelli)	Happy Perez	4:48
10.	"Lil Poppa Got a Brand New Bag" (featuring Max Minelli)	Happy Perez	3:16
11.	"Confedi" (featuring C-Loc, Lee Tyme and Max Minelli)	Happy Perez	5:02
12.	"Da Last Outlaw"	Happy Perez	4:25
13.	"Ghost Rider"	Happy Perez	3:22
14.	"We Don't Stop" (featuring Max Minelli)	Happy Perez	5:22
Total length:			57:19

== Personnel ==
- Glenn "Young Bleed" Clifton Jr. – main artist
- Steven "C-Loc" Carrell – guest artist (tracks: 1, 6, 8, 9, 11), executive producer
- Percy "Master P Miller – guest artist (tracks: 1, 2, 7, 8), executive producer
- Michael "Mystikal" Tyler – guest artist (track 2)
- Chad "Max Minelli" Roussel – guest artist (tracks: 5, 6, 9–11, 14)
- Lucky Knuckles – guest artist (tracks: 5, 6)
- J-Von – guest artist (tracks: 5, 6)
- Lee Tyme – guest artist (tracks: 6, 11)
- Richard "Fiend" Jones – guest artist (track 7)
- Raymond "Mo B. Dick" Poole – guest artist (track 7), producer (tracks: 2, 7)
- Odell Vickers Jr. – guest artist (track 7), producer (track 5)
- Nathan "Happy" Perez – producer (tracks: 1, 3, 4, 6, 8–14)
- Craig "KLC" Lawson – producer (tracks: 1, 2, 8)
- Craig Bazile – producer (track 2)
- Chad "Pimp C" Butler – producer (track 2)
- Pen & Pixel Graphics – artwork
- Omni Color – design
- Dave Weiner – A&R
- Duffy Rich – A&R
- Kevin Faist – A&R

== Charts ==
=== Weekly charts ===
Chart (1998)	Peak position
US Billboard 200	10
US Top R&B/Hip-Hop Albums (Billboard)	1

=== Year-end charts ===
Chart (1998)	Position
US Billboard 200	194
US Top R&B/Hip-Hop Albums (Billboard)	45

== Certifications ==
Region	Certification	Certified units/sales
United States (RIAA)	Gold	500,000^{^}
^{^} Shipments figures based on certification alone.

== See also ==
- List of Billboard number-one R&B albums of 1998
