= Guilty 'til Proven Innocent =

Guilty Til Proven Innocent

Studio album by Prime Suspects
- Released: October 6, 1998
- Recorded: 1997–1998
- Genre: Hip-hop
- Length: 1:17:54
- Label: No Limit; Priority
- Producer: Beats by the Pound

Professional ratings
Review scores
Source	Rating
AllMusic	4/5 stars

Guilty Til Proven Innocent is the only studio album by American hip-hop group Prime Suspects. It was released on October 6, 1998 via No Limit/Priority Records. Production was handled by Beats By The Pound. It features guest appearances from C-Murder, Fiend, Kane & Abel, Lil' Rowdy, Mac, Master P, Mia X, Mr. Serv-On, Ms. Peaches, Mystikal, Silkk the Shocker, Snoop Dogg and Steady Mobb'n. The album debuted at number 36 on the Billboard 200 and number 14 on the Top R&B/Hip-Hop Albums charts, selling 39,000 copies in its first week in the United States.

== Track listing ==
No.	Title	Writer(s)	Producer(s)	Length
1.	"All 4 One" (featuring Master P)	Tayari Herrera; Damien Dixon; Ernest Espradron; Percy Miller	Craig B.	3:04
2.	"Money Makes..." (featuring Kane & Abel & Silkk the Shocker)	Herrera; Dixon; Espradron; David Garcia; Silkk the Shocker; Vyshonn Miller	Mo B. Dick	4:07
3.	"Liquidation of the Ghetto" (featuring Mystikal)	Herrera; Dixon; Espradron; Michael Tyler	O'Dell	3:53
4.	"Mac's and Choppers"	Herrera; Dixon; Espradron	O'Dell	3:37
5.	"Bust Back"	Herrera; Dixon; Espradron	Mo B. Dick	4:25
6.	"Ride Wit My Heat"	Herrera; Dixon; Espradron	KLC	2:57
7.	"Of All da Hustlers" (featuring C-Murder)	Herrera; Dixon; Espradron; Corey Miller	O'Dell	4:23
8.	"My Old Lady" (featuring Fiend & Snoop Dogg)	Herrera; Dixon; Espradron; Richard Jones; Calvin Broadus	KLC	5:11
9.	"Tweekin'"	Herrera; Dixon; Espradron	KLC	2:10
10.	"Someone Shoulda Told Me" (featuring Mia X)	Herrera; Dixon; Espradron; Mia Young	Mo B. Dick	3:54
11.	"We Gots to Do 'Em" (featuring Steady Mobb'n)	Herrera; Dixon; Espradron; Aaron Edmand; Billy Moore	KLC	4:41
12.	"Here I Go Again" (featuring Mr. Serv-On)	Herrera; Dixon; Espradron; Corey Smith	Mo B. Dick	4:11
13.	"Consequences of the Streets"	Herrera; Dixon; Espradron	KLC	4:12
14.	"Young Niggas"	Herrera; Dixon; Espradron	Craig B.	4:08
15.	"Soldier 4 Life"	Herrera; Dixon; Espradron	Craig B.	3:23
16.	"Last Days" (featuring Mac & Lil' Rowdy)	Herrera; Dixon; Espradron; McKinley Phipps, Jr.; Lil' Rowdy	Craig B.	4:02
17.	"Daily Routine"	Herrera; Dixon; Espradron	KLC	3:50
18.	"Guilty Til Proven Innocent"	Herrera; Dixon; Espradron	Mo B. Dick	3:41
19.	"Fear"	Herrera; Dixon; Espradron	Carlos Stephens	3:46
20.	"Children of the Corn" (featuring Peaches)	Herrera; Dixon; Espradron; Aldreamer Smith	Mo B. Dick	4:19
Total length:				1:17:54

Notes

- Track 3 contains additional vocals by O'Dell and Peaches.
- Track 12 contains additional vocals by Mo B. Dick.
- Track 16 contains uncredited additional vocals by Mr. Serv-On.

== Charts ==
Chart (1998)	Peak position
US Billboard 200	36
US Top R&B/Hip-Hop Albums (Billboard)	14
