= Ghetto Organized =

Studio album by Gambino Family
- Released: October 20, 1998
- Recorded: 1997–98
- Genre: Hip-hop
- Length: 1:19:27
- Label: No Limit
- Producers: Master P; Beats By The Pound

Professional ratings
Review scores
Source	Rating
AllMusic	2.5/5 stars

Ghetto Organized is the debut album by the American hip-hop group the Gambino Family, which was an in-house creation of No Limit Records. The album was released on October 20, 1998.

== Background ==
The album was produced by Beats by the Pound. It features guest appearances from 241, Big Ed, C-Murder, Fiend, Full Blooded, Ghetto Commission, KLC, Mac, Magic, Master P, Mia X, Mo B. Dick, Mr. Serv-On, Mystikal, O'Dell, Porsha, QB, Silkk the Shocker and Snoop Dogg. The album peaked at number 17 on the Billboard 200 and number 3 on the Top R&B/Hip-Hop Albums chart selling 160,000 copies in its first week. The tracks "Studio B" and "Childhood Years" were released as promotional singles.

== Reviews ==
Stephen Thomas Erlewine of AllMusic described the project as "filled with cheaply made, bass-heavy jams" created by formula with "little or no imagination to the lyrical ideas", and delivered by rappers without "verbal dexterity". Erlewine said that the only reason that the album sold so many copies was because No Limit promoted it relentlessly prior to release. The result was "truly unremarkable" music revealing the "lameness" of the project.

== Track listing ==
No.	Title	Producer(s)	Length
1.	"I'm a Baller" (featuring Master P, C-Murder, Mia X & Fiend)	KLC	4:34
2.	"Childhood Years" (featuring C-Murder & Porsha)	Craig B.	4:29
3.	"Make'm Bleed" (featuring Silkk the Shocker, Fiend, C-Murder & Mr. Serv-On)	KLC	4:22
4.	"Desperado"	Craig B.	3:34
5.	"Drama in My City" (featuring KLC & Ghetto Commission)	Carlos Stephens	3:52
6.	"Trapped in a Storm" (featuring Mia X & C-Murder)	Craig B.	4:18
7.	"Only G's Ride" (featuring Mystikal & Mo B. Dick)	KLC	4:35
8.	"Clean Sweep"	Mo B. Dick	3:46
9.	"Ghetto Wayz" (featuring Porsha)	Mo B. Dick	5:17
10.	"So Much Drama" (featuring Magic, 241 & O'Dell)	O'Dell	4:36
11.	"Studio B" (featuring Snoop Dogg & Mo B. Dick)	Mo B. Dick	4:02
12.	"Young Gunz"	Mo B. Dick	4:21
13.	"Losing My Faith"	Carlos Stephens	4:58
14.	"Memories"	Carlos Stephens	4:25
15.	"2 All My Thug Niggaz" (featuring Big Ed, Full Blooded & Mac)	Craig B.	4:44
16.	"Don't Cry" (featuring Fiend, QB, Magic & C-Murder)	KLC	5:34
17.	"Mafiosos"	Carlos Stephens	4:15
18.	"U Neva Know"	Craig B.	4:04
Total length:			1:19:27

== Charts ==
Chart (1998)	Peak position
US Billboard 200	17
US Top R&B Albums (Billboard)	3
