= Memorial Day (album) =

Studio album by Full Blooded
- Released: December 1, 1998
- Recorded: 1998
- Genre: Gangsta rap
- Length: 1:00:54
- Label: No Limit; Priority
- Producer: Beats by the Pound; Ke'Noe

Full Blooded chronology
Memorial Day (1998)	Untamed (2001)

Professional ratings
Review scores
Source	Rating
AllMusic	2.5/5 stars
RapReviews	7/10

Memorial Day is the debut studio album by American rapper Full Blooded. It was released on December 1, 1998, via No Limit/Priority Records. The production was handled by Beats by the Pound and Ke'Noe, with Master P serving as executive producer. It features guest appearances from the Hounds of Gert Town (Nite Tyme and Camouflage), Ghetto Commission, Big Ed, C-Murder, Snoop Dogg, Steady Mobb'n, Ms. Peaches and Mo B. Dick.

The album peaked at number 112 on the Billboard 200, number 20 on the Top R&B/Hip-Hop Albums chart, and topped the Heatseekers Albums chart in the United States.

== Track listing ==
No.	Title	Producer(s)	Length
1.	"Dog Shit"	Carlos Stephens	2:10
2.	"Quickest Way to Die"	Mo B. Dick	4:13
3.	"Foes Bleed Bullets" (performed by Hounds From Gert Town)	Craig B.	3:25
4.	"Sleep No More" (performed by Hounds From Gert Town)	O'Dell	3:56
5.	"Same Ole Nigga"	Carlos Stephens	3:03
6.	"I'm Gonna Hustle" (featuring C-Murder and Big Ed)	Ke'Noe	3:57
7.	"Out of Sight, Out of Mind" (featuring Dolliolie and Ms. Peaches)	Carlos Stephens	4:10
8.	"My Day Gon Come"	Mo B. Dick	3:54
9.	"Gangsta Shit" (featuring Snoop Dogg)	Mark In The Dark	3:40
10.	"Bad Dreams" (performed by Hounds From Gert Town)	O'Dell	4:13
11.	"Head Busting" (performed by Hounds From Gert Town)	Carlos Stephens	4:03
12.	"Red Rum" (featuring Nite Tyme)	O'Dell	4:17
13.	"Give 'Em Some"	Carlos Stephens	4:32
14.	"Dogfight" (featuring Ghetto Commission)	Carlos Stephens	3:22
15.	"Count Down" (featuring Camouflage and Steady Mobb'n)	KLC	3:59
16.	"Full Blooded"	Mo B. Dick	4:00
Total length:			1:00:54

== Charts ==
Chart (1998)	Peak position
US Billboard 200	112
US Top R&B/Hip-Hop Albums (Billboard)	20
US Heatseekers Albums (Billboard)	1
