= We Can't Be Stopped (No Limit Records album) =

Compilation album by Various artists
- Released: December 8, 1998
- Recorded: 1997−1998
- Genre: Southern hip hop, gangsta rap
- Length: 64:13
- Label: No Limit/Priority
- Producer: Beats By the Pound; Meech Wells Ke'Noe

No Limit compilation chronology
Mean Green (1998)	We Can't Be Stopped (1998)	Foolish (1999)

Professional ratings
Review scores
Source	Rating
Allmusic	2.5/5 stars
Rolling Stone	3/5 stars

We Can't Be Stopped is a compilation album released by hip hop record label No Limit Records. It was released on December 8, 1998, and was produced by Beats By the Pound members KLC, Mo B. Dick, Craig B. and Carlos Stephens, Meech Wells and Ke'Noe. The album was successful on the charts, selling 110,000 copies in its first week, peaking at #19 on the Billboard 200 and #2 on the Top R&B/Hip-Hop Albums.

== Track listing ==
No.	Title	Length
1.	"No Limit Soldiers II" (TRU, Mia X, Mystikal, C-Murder, Fiend, Big Ed, Magic, Mr. Serv-On)	5:16
2.	"I Ain't Playin'" (Mystikal)	4:27
3.	"Gangsta Move" (Snoop Dogg, Charlie Wilson)	4:53
4.	"Girl Power" (Mia X)	2:22
5.	"Break Something" (Fiend)	3:40
6.	"Real Niggaz Gon Ride" (C-Murder & Magic)	3:38
7.	"Ghost in da Dark II" (Ghetto Commission)	3:25
8.	"Red Rum" (Steady Mobb'n)	2:53
9.	"Heaven 4 a Thug" (C-Murder, Mac & Magic)	4:17
10.	"Hound Out" (Full Blooded & Hounds Of Gert-Town)	4:27
11.	"It's a Riot" (Kane & Abel)	4:16
12.	"Straight from da Heart" (Prime Suspects)	3:40
13.	"My City" (Mr. Serv-On)	3:25
14.	"New Orleans Threats" (Gotti, Pheno & QB)	3:48
15.	"Assassin" (Big Ed & Fiend)	3:45
16.	"Where da Lil Soldiers At?" (Lil Soldiers)	4:35
17.	"Bring My Burners" (Freedom)	2:35

== Charts ==
=== Weekly charts ===
Chart (1998)	Peak position
US Billboard 200	19
US Top R&B/Hip-Hop Albums (Billboard)	2

=== Year-end charts ===
Chart (1999)	Position
US Billboard 200	173
US Top R&B/Hip-Hop Albums (Billboard)	52
