= Most Wanted (Kane & Abel album) =

Studio album by Kane & Abel
- Released: September 26, 2000
- Recorded: 2000
- Studio: Most Wanted Soundlab (Baton Rouge, LA); South Coast Studio (New Orleans, LA); Ultrasonic Studios (New Orleans, LA)
- Genre: Hip-hop
- Length: 51:11
- Label: Most Wanted Empire
- Producer: Big Ro; David Banner; Full Pack; Happy Perez; Hex Luger; Lunatic

Kane & Abel chronology
Rise to Power (1999)	Most Wanted (2000)	The Last Ones Left (2002)

Professional ratings
Review scores
Source	Rating
AllMusic	3/5 stars

Most Wanted is the fifth studio album by American hip-hop duo Kane & Abel. It was released on September 26, 2000, via Most Wanted Empire. Recording sessions took place at Most Wanted Soundlab in Baton Rouge, South Coast Studio and Ultrasonic Studios in New Orleans. Production was handled by Big Ro, David Banner, Full Pack Music, Happy Perez, Hex Luger and Lunatic. It features guest appearances from 5th Ward Weebie, Boss Player, Fiend, Partners-N-Crime, Sundown and The Pimptations.

The album sold 8,500 copies in its first week of release in the United States. It peaked at number 194 on the Billboard 200, number 41 on the Top R&B/Hip-Hop Albums and number 16 on the Independent Albums charts. A single from the album, "Shake It Like a Dog" reached No. 57 on the Hot R&B/Hip-Hop Songs and No. 5 on the Hot Rap Songs charts in the US.

== Track listing ==
No.	Title	Producer(s)	Length
1.	"Informant (Commercial)"		1:12
2.	"Drama"	Hex Luger	4:59
3.	"Shake It Like a Dog"	Full Pack Music	4:13
4.	"Count Your Ones"	Hex Luger	4:27
5.	"Get Right!"	Big Ro	3:59
6.	"Quick 2 Buss"	Happy Perez	4:10
7.	"Jail of Eden (Commercial)"		4:17
8.	"Kane and Abel"	Big Ro	0:23
9.	"Golden Shower (Commercial)"		0:42
10.	"Don't Give a Fuck About Cha"	Hex Luger	4:13
11.	"AKZ"	Big Ro	3:28
12.	"Lemme Get up in Ya"	Hex Luger	3:41
13.	"Vic (Commercial)"		0:15
14.	"We Got That Candy"	Lunatic	3:48
15.	"Somebody Gotta Pay"	David Banner	4:18
16.	"Snakes"	Big Ro	3:06
Total length:			51:11

== Charts ==
Chart (2000)	Peak position
US Billboard 200	194
US Top R&B/Hip-Hop Albums (Billboard)	41
US Independent Albums (Billboard)	16
