= Unlady Like =

Studio album by Mia X
- Released: June 24, 1997
- Recorded: 1996–1997
- Genres: Southern hip hop; gangsta rap
- Length: 80:19
- Labels: No Limit; Priority; EMI
- Producers: Master P (exec.); Beats By the Pound

Mia X chronology
Good Girl Gone Bad (1995)	Unlady Like (1997)	Mama Drama (1998)

Unlady Like is the second studio album by American rapper Mia X. It was released on June 24, 1997, on No Limit Records, distributed by Priority Records and EMI, and featured production from Beats By the Pound. The album made it to number 21 on the Billboard 200 and number two on the Top R&B/Hip-Hop Albums chart. The album was certified Gold by the RIAA. Fellow No Limit artists Master P, C-Murder, Silkk the Shocker, Mr. Serv-On, Fiend, Mac, Kane & Abel, KLC, Mystikal, Mercedes, Mo B Dick, O'Dell and Big Ed are featured, along with Foxy Brown. The song "The Party Don't Stop" charted on the Hot R&B/Hip Hop Airplay chart in August 1997.

== Critical reception ==
Professional ratings
Review scores
Source	Rating
AllMusic	4/5 stars
Robert Christgau	B+
The Source	3.5/5 stars
Vibe	(favorable)

AllMusic editor Leo Stanley was critical of the "cheap production and borrowed ideas" throughout the album, but concluded that "Mia X has personality and can occasionally toss out a funny line, and there are a few cuts where it all gels; that's where Unlady Like becomes highly entertaining, sub-gangsta hardcore hip-hop." In his Consumer Guide, Robert Christgau criticized the "predictably generic" boasts, "typically excessive" runtime and the overabundance of cliches, but after hearing Mia X's ode to her deceased friend, he critiqued that "her declarations of leather-skinned cynicism and wit's-end vulnerability take on a retrospective weight that counterbalances their surface contradictions."

== Track listing ==
No.	Title	Producer(s)	Length
1.	"You Don't Wanna Go 2 War" (featuring TRU and Mystikal)	KLC	5:26
2.	"The Party Don't Stop" (featuring Master P and Foxy Brown)	Craig B	4:13
3.	"I Pitty U"	O'Dell	4:13
4.	"Who Got tha Clout" (featuring Mystikal)	O'Dell	3:22
5.	"Ain't 2 be Played Wit"	Craig B	3:01
6.	"Unlady Like" (featuring KLC)	KLC	4:24
7.	"Intro"		0:37
8.	"I'll Take Ya Man '97"	KLC	4:47
9.	"Let's Get It Straight" (featuring Mystikal)	KLC	3:29
10.	"4Ever Tru" (featuring TRU)	Craig B	5:19
11.	"Bring da Drama" (featuring Fiend, Big Ed and Mr. Serv-On)	Craig B	2:51
12.	"All Ns"	Craig B	4:09
13.	"Mama's Family" (featuring Fiend, KLC, Kane & Abel, Mac and Mr. Serv-On)	Craig B	5:52
14.	"I Don't Know Why" (featuring Mo B. Dick)	Mo B. Dick	4:28
15.	"Hoodlum Poetry"	Craig B	5:22
16.	"Rainy Dayz"	Mo B. Dick	4:52
17.	"Mommie's Angels" (featuring Mo B. Dick)	Mo B. Dick	4:01
18.	"You & Me" (featuring O'Dell and T.C.)	O'Dell	4:38
19.	"RIP, Jill"	KLC	3:37
20.	"Thank You" (featuring Mo B. Dick, T.C. and Mercedes)	O'Dell and KLC	1:31

== Charts ==
=== Weekly charts ===
Chart (1997)	Peak position
US Billboard 200	21
US Top R&B/Hip-Hop Albums (Billboard)	2

=== Year-end charts ===
Chart (1997)	Position
US Billboard 200	186
US Top R&B/Hip-Hop Albums (Billboard)	39

== Certifications ==
Region	Certification	Certified units/sales
United States (RIAA)	Gold	515,000
