= Rear End =

Studio album by Mercedes
- Released: June 29, 1999
- Recorded: 1997–1999
- Genres: R&B, hip hop, hip hop soul
- Length: 70:09
- Labels: No Limit; Priority
- Producer: Beats By the Pound

Professional ratings
Review scores
Source	Rating
AllMusic	3/5 stars
USA Today	2.5/4 stars

Rear End is the only studio album released by American recording artist Mercedes. It was released on June 29, 1999, through No Limit Records and Priority Records. It was produced by Beats By the Pound. Rear End found mild success on the Billboard charts in the United States, but was not as successful as some of their other chart-topping releases during that time, only peaking at #72 on the Billboard 200 and #12 on the Top R&B/Hip-Hop Albums.

One single found success on the charts: "It's Your Thing", which featured Master P, made it to number 96 on the Billboard Hot 100, number 31 on the Hot R&B/Hip-Hop Singles & Tracks, and number 4 on the Hot Rap Singles.

"Do You Wanna Ride" was only included on the first edition press of the album and was later taken off due to copyright infringement for the sample(s) not being cleared properly and/or used without permission. A second edition or re-release/re-pressing also exists with that track not appearing on the album the second time around. Future pressings of the album contained 22 tracks unlike the original, first pressing that contains 23 tracks. The samples that were not cleared on the song are as follows: "Nasty Girl" by Vanity 6 & "Mercedes Boy" by Pebbles.

== Track listing ==
No.	Title	Length
1.	"It's Your Thing" (feat. Master P and Ms. Peaches)	4:00
2.	"Pussy" (feat. Ghetto Commission)	4:07
3.	"Talk 2 Me" (feat. Erica Foxx, Master P and Mia X)	2:40
4.	"I Can Tell" (feat. Mac, Jamo and Ms. Peaches)	3:36
5.	"Hit 'Em" (feat. Mia X and A-Lexxus)	3:46
6.	"Kiss Da Cat" (feat. 1st Time)	2:02
7.	"Do You Wanna Ride" (feat. Master P)	3:06
8.	"N's Ain't Shit" (feat. Mia X)	3:15
9.	"Bonnie & Clyde" (feat. Magic)	4:14
10.	"Pony Ride" (feat. Ms. Peaches, O'Dell and Erica Foxx)	4:52
11.	"Candle Light & Champagne" (feat. Mia X)	2:08
12.	"Camouflage" (feat. Mac and Samm)	3:48
13.	"Stop Playing On My Phone" (feat. Master P)	0:57
14.	"Hush" (feat. Master P, Mystikal and Ms Peaches)	2:59
15.	"What You Need" (feat. A-Lexxus and Silkk The Shocker)	3:34
16.	"Crazy Bout Ya" (feat. Master P and Ms. Peaches)	5:19
17.	"My Love" (feat. Mr. Serv-On and A-Lexxus)	2:03
18.	"Free Game" (feat. A-Lexxus and Lil Italy)	3:30
19.	"Chillin" (feat. A-Lexxus)	0:59
20.	"I'm Down" (feat. A-Lexxus)	0:27
21.	"I Need A Thug" (feat. O'Dell, Popeye and Master P)	4:09
22.	"You're The Only One" (feat. A-Lexxus)	3:17
23.	"Talk Dirty To The DJ's" (feat. Master P)	1:22
Total length:		70:10

== Chart positions ==
Chart (1999)	Peak position
U.S. Billboard 200	72
U.S. Billboard Top R&B/Hip-Hop Albums	12
