= Down South Hustlers: Bouncin' and Swingin' =

Compilation album by Various artists
- Released: October 31, 1995
- Recorded: 1995
- Genre: Southern hip hop, gangsta rap
- Length: 115:08
- Label: No Limit/Priority
- Producer: Beats By the Pound

No Limit compilation chronology
High Fo Xmas (1994)	Down South Hustlers (1995)	West Coast Bad Boyz II (1997)

Professional ratings
Review scores
Source	Rating
Allmusic	3/5 stars

Down South Hustlers: Bouncin' and Swingin' is a compilation album released by No Limit Records. It was released on October 31, 1995, as one of the first releases through the No Limit/Priority Records partnership. The album didn't make it as high as some of No Limit's later releases, but it managed to peak at #139 on the Billboard 200 and #13 on the Top R&B/Hip-Hop Albums chart. It spawned the classic Down South collaboration "Playaz From Da South" featuring Master P, Silkk the Shocker (both members of TRU) and UGK. It also marked the only appearances of No Limit artists CCG, Fire, Sir True and Polo. The album was certified gold by RIAA.

== Track listing ==
Disc 1
No.	Title	Length
1.	"Stick N Move" (The Dayton Family)	5:56
2.	"Fuck Dem Niggaz" (Eightball & MJG)	4:20
3.	"Playaz from the South" (Master P, Silkk the Shocker & UGK)	6:08
4.	"A Lot Auh Nuttin'" (Chico & 187)	4:33
5.	"Commercial 1"	0:11
6.	"Can't Trust No Man" (Mia X)	4:04
7.	"Way Down South" (Joe Blakk)	4:47
8.	"Hustlin'" (Master P, C-Murder & Partners-N-Crime)	5:43
9.	"Got It Sowed Up" (PKO)	4:01
10.	"Fright Night" (Tre-8)	4:29
11.	"Darkside" (Skull Duggery)	2:20
12.	"Who Am I?" (C-Loc)	4:44
13.	"You Got It" (Magnolia Slim)	3:42
14.	"R.I.P." (Master P, Silkk the Shocker & CCG)	5:37

Disc 2
No.	Title	Length
1.	"Bounce That Azz" (Gangsta T, King George, Silkk the Shocker & Master P)	5:26
2.	"My Woman" (Coop MC)	4:04
3.	"Gettin' High" (Fire)	2:35
4.	"Backstreets" (202Life & PSK Thirteen)	5:56
5.	"Handle Your Business" (Mr. Serv-On)	4:26
6.	"Down South Thugs" (Polo)	3:36
7.	"Don't Underestimate Me" (Sir True)	4:22
8.	"So Much Pain" (Master P, Mia X & Tre8)	3:53
9.	"The South" (E.S.G.)	4:00
10.	"Murder Weapon" (Hounds of GertTown aka Full Blooded)	4:35
11.	"G's Stay Real" (Niggas Out the Ghetto)	5:03
12.	"My Mind Went Blank" (DJ Screw & Point Blank)	6:37

== Charts ==
=== Weekly charts ===
Chart (1995)	Peak position
US Billboard 200	139
US Top R&B/Hip-Hop Albums (Billboard)	13

=== Year-end charts ===
Chart (1996)	Position
US Top R&B/Hip-Hop Albums (Billboard)	97
