= Mean Green (album) =

Compilation album by Various artists
- Released: September 29, 1998
- Recorded: 1998
- Genres: Southern hip hop, gangsta rap
- Length: 71:21
- Label: No Limit/Priority
- Producers: Master P (exec.); Beats By the Pound, Ant Banks, Pimp C, Studio Ton, Tone Capone, Irv

No Limit compilation chronology
| I Got the Hook Up (1998) | Major Players Compilation (1998) | We Can't Be Stopped (1998) |

Professional ratings
Review scores
| Source | Rating |
|---|---|
| AllMusic | 3/5 stars |
| Rolling Stone | 3/5 stars |

Mean Green is a compilation album released by American hip-hop record label No Limit Records. It was released on September 29, 1998, and featured a majority of No Limit's artists, as well as other rappers including UGK and Mack 10. The album peaked at No. 9 on the Billboard 200 and No. 6 on the Top R&B/Hip-Hop Albums chart, selling 89,000 copies in its first week of release. The album was certified Gold by the RIAA with over 500,000 copies shipped in just five weeks. The song "Don't Be Mad" by Passion was a success.

== Music video ==
A music video for the single "Major Players" was released.

== Track listing ==
| No. | Title | Length |
|---|---|---|
| 1. | "Mean Green" | 1:17 |
| 2. | "We..." (Fiend & Mac) | 3:00 |
| 3. | "Tossed Up" (UGK) | 3:59 |
| 4. | "Devil's Playground" (Ghetto Commission) | 4:20 |
| 5. | "Major Players" (Master P, Mia X, Silkk the Shocker & Porsha) | 4:11 |
| 6. | "Better Player" (Too Short) | 4:22 |
| 7. | "Dying in My City" (C-Murder, Magic & Snoop Dogg) | 5:00 |
| 8. | "MG Theme" (Steady Mobb'n & Mo B. Dick) | 3:48 |
| 9. | "Sucka Repellent" (E-40 & Suga T) | 4:40 |
| 10. | "Ashes and Dust" (Gambino Family & Master P) | 3:21 |
| 11. | "Close 2 You" (Lil Soldiers & Mo B. Dick) | 3:15 |
| 12. | "Luv 4 Me" (Mr. Serv-On & Full Blooded) | 4:09 |
| 13. | "That's the Nigga" (Mystikal) | 3:00 |
| 14. | "The Mirror Don't Lie" (2 For 1) | 2:57 |
| 15. | "For Ya Troubles" (Prime Suspects) | 3:42 |
| 16. | "Don't Be Mad" (Passion) | 2:58 |
| 17. | "Bigga Than..." (B-Legit & C-Murder) | 4:36 |
| 18. | "Tell Me When" (Mo B. Dick) | 4:52 |
| 19. | "Gotta Have Cash" (Mack 10 & The Comrads) | 3:54 |

== Certifications ==
| Region | Certification | Certified units/sales |
|---|---|---|
| United States (RIAA) | Gold | 500,000^{^} |
^{^} Shipments figures based on certification alone.
