= Boot Camp (album) =

Studio album by Lil Soldiers
- Released: April 27, 1999
- Recorded: 1998–99
- Genre: Hip hop
- Length: 59:14
- Labels: No Limit; Priority
- Producers: Master P (exec.); Carlos Stephens; Craig B; Ke'Noe; KLC; Mo B. Dick; O'Dell; Powerful; Supreme Nyborn

Professional ratings
Review scores
| Source | Rating |
|---|---|
| AllMusic | 2/5 stars |
| RapReviews | 2/10 |

Boot Camp is the only studio album by American hip hop duo Lil Soldiers. It was released on April 27, 1999, through No Limit/Priority Records. Production was handled by Beats By The Pound. It features guest appearances from Fiend, Ghetto Commission, Magic, Melchior, Mia X, Reginelli and Short Circuit. The album peaked at number 80 on the Billboard 200 and number 22 on the Top R&B/Hip-Hop Albums chart in the United States. It spawned two promotional singles: "Close 2 You" and "Where Da Lil Soldiers At?".

== Track listing ==
| No. | Title | Producer(s) | Length |
|---|---|---|---|
| 1. | "Soulja Style" (featuring Magic) | Ke'Noe | 3:45 |
| 2. | "Where the Little Souljas At?" | Craig B. | 4:36 |
| 3. | "Tank in My Hand" (featuring Mia X) | Carlos Stephens | 3:46 |
| 4. | "I Ain't Livin' Right" (featuring Ghetto Commission) | Carlos Stephens | 4:01 |
| 5. | "Close 2 You" | Carlos Stephens; Mo B. Dick | 3:14 |
| 6. | "School on Lock" | Supreme Nyborn | 3:22 |
| 7. | "Get Up" | Craig B. | 3:12 |
| 8. | "Mama Need a New Blouse" (featuring Short Circuit) | KLC | 3:09 |
| 9. | "School Yard Battlin'" | Supreme Nyborn | 3:29 |
| 10. | "Chipped Out Tank" | KLC | 3:54 |
| 11. | "For My Shorties" (featuring Fiend) | Carlos Stephens; KLC | 2:36 |
| 12. | "Close 2 a Bomb" | O'Dell | 3:24 |
| 13. | "Best in the World" | Powerful | 3:04 |
| 14. | "Soulja by Blood" | KLC | 3:48 |
| 15. | "Bring It 2 You" | KLC | 3:05 |
| 16. | "Okey Dokey" | Carlos Stephens; O'Dell | 3:18 |
| 17. | "Shout It Out" (featuring Melchior and Reginelli) | Carlos Stephens; O'Dell | 3:31 |
| Total length: | | | 59:14 |

Notes

- Track 5 features additional vocals from Mo B. Dick
- Track 13 features additional vocals from Keith, KK and Powerful
- Track 16 features additional vocals from O'Dell

== Charts ==
Chart performance for Boot Camp
| Chart (1999) | Peak position |
|---|---|
| US Billboard 200 | 80 |
| US Top R&B/Hip-Hop Albums (Billboard) | 22 |
