= Life Insurance (album) =

Studio album by Mr. Serv-On
- Released: August 12, 1997
- Recorded: 1996−1997
- Genre: Southern hip-hop; gangsta rap
- Length: 1:16:30
- Label: No Limit; Priority
- Producer: Brotha Lynch Hung; Carlos Stephens; Craig B; KLC; Mo B. Dick; O'Dell

Mr. Serv-On chronology
Life Insurance (1997)	Da Next Level (1999)

Professional ratings
Review scores
Source	Rating
AllMusic	4/5 stars

Life Insurance is the debut studio album by American rapper Mr. Serv-On. It was released on August 12, 1997, via No Limit/Priority Records. Production was handled by KLC, Craig B, O'Dell, Brotha Lynch Hung, Carlos Stephens and Mo B. Dick, with Master P serving as executive producer. The album debuted at number 23 on the Billboard 200 and peaked at number 5 on the Top R&B/Hip-Hop Albums charts with first-week sales of 50,000 units in the United States. According to Mr Serv On himself in an interview in 2015, the album was certified Gold in just five weeks after release.

== Track listing ==
No.	Title	Writer(s)	Producer(s)	Length
1.	"Let's Get It Started"	Corey Smith; Mia Young; Percy Miller; Vyshonn Miller	Craig B.	4:18
2.	"My Best Friend"	Smith; P. Miller	Carlos Stephens	5:03
3.	"Head & Shoulders"	Smith; V. Miller; Young	Mo B. Dick	4:44
4.	"Heaven Is So Close"	Smith; P. Miller; V. Miller	KLC	5:35
5.	"It's Real"	Smith; Kevin Mann; P. Miller	Brotha Lynch Hung	4:25
6.	"P Dreams"	Smith	O'Dell	4:04
7.	"Die Rich"	Smith; Tayari Herrera; Damien Dixon; Ernest Espradron; McKinley Phipps, Jr.; Lawrence Johnson; Reginald Johnson; Melchior Johnson; Edward Bell	O'Dell	4:50
8.	"Who Raised Me"	Smith; Richard Jones	KLC	4:47
9.	"You Know I Would"	Smith; Young	KLC	3:29
10.	"Hustlin'"	Smith; Michael Tyler; P. Miller	Craig B.	3:45
11.	"Cemetery Made"	Smith; Corey Miller	Craig B.	3:51
12.	"5 Hollow Points"	Smith; Edward Lee Knight; Jones; Daniel Garcia; David Garcia; Young	KLC	4:17
13.	"Tryin' to Make It Out da Ghetto"	Smith; P. Miller	KLC	3:04
14.	"Time to Check My Fetty"	Smith; P. Miller	KLC	3:25
15.	"Affiliated"	Smith	KLC	4:09
16.	"We Ain't the Same"	Smith	KLC	4:34
17.	"Throw Ya City Up"	Smith	KLC	3:59
18.	"Last Wordz"	Smith; Young	Craig B.	4:11
Total length:				1:16:30

== Charts ==
=== Weekly charts ===
Chart (1997)	Peak position
US Billboard 200	23
US Top R&B Albums (Billboard)	5

=== Year-end charts ===
Chart (1997)	Position
US Top R&B Albums (Billboard)	82
