= Give It 2 'Em Raw =

Studio album by Soulja Slim
- Released: May 19, 1998
- Recorded: March–May 1998
- Genre: Gangsta rap; hardcore hip-hop; Southern hip-hop
- Length: 73:49
- Label: No Limit; Priority
- Producer: Master P (exec.); KLC; Craig B.; O'Dell; Carlos Stephens; Mo B. Dick; DJ Daryl

Soulja Slim chronology
Dark Side (1995)	Give It 2 'Em Raw (1998)	The Streets Made Me (2001)

Singles from Give It 2 'Em Raw
- 1. "From What I Was Told" Released: 1998; 2. "Street Life" Released: 1998

Professional ratings
Review scores
Source	Rating
AllMusic	3.5/5 stars
Rolling Stone	3.5/5 stars

Give It 2 'Em Raw is the debut studio album by American rapper Soulja Slim, released on May 19, 1998, on No Limit Records and Priority. The album was a success, debuting at number 13 on the Billboard 200. It also debuted at number 4 on the Top R&B/Hip-Hop Albums.

== Commercial performance ==
The album debuted at number 13 on the Billboard 200 chart, with first-week sales of 82,000 copies in the United States. Slim was serving time in prison as a result of a violation of his probation shortly after the release of this album.

== Track listing ==
Give It 2 'Em Raw
No.	Title	Writer(s)	Producer(s)	Length
1.	"From What I Was Told"	James Tapp	Carlos Stephens	3:26
2.	"Street Life" (featuring Silkk The Shocker, Master P & O'Dell)	James Tapp; Vyshonne Miller; Percy Miller	DJ Daryl	4:26
3.	"Wright Me" (featuring O'Dell)	James Tapp	Carlos Stephens	4:18
4.	"At The Same Time" (featuring Snoop Dogg)	James Tapp; Cordozar Broadus	KLC	3:13
5.	"Only Real Niggas"	James Tapp	KLC	3:52
6.	"Pray For Your Baby" (featuring Master P & Tre-Nitty)	James Tapp; Percy Miller; Trenitty	Craig B.	2:45
7.	"Head Buster" (featuring Big Ed & Mr. Serv-On)	James Tapp; Edward Knight; Corey Smith	Carlos Stephens	3:36
8.	"Me & My Cousin" (featuring Full Blooded)	James Tapp; Full Blooded	Carlos Stephens	3:11
9.	"You Got It" (featuring Mia X)	James Tapp; Mia Young	KLC	4:57
10.	"You Ain't Never Seen" (featuring Master P)	James Tapp; Percy Miller	Craig B.	3:47
11.	"Anything" (featuring Mia X)	James Tapp; Mia Young	Craig B.	2:35
12.	"Imagine" (featuring C-Murder & Mac)	James Tapp; Corey Miller; McKinley Phipps Jr	Craig B.	3:48
13.	"Takin' Hits"	James Tapp	O'Dell	3:29
14.	"Wootay"	James Tapp	KLC	3:31
15.	"Get High With Me" (featuring Tre-Nitty & Mystikal)	James Tapp; Trenitty; Michael Tyler	Carlos Stephens	4:04
16.	"Law Brekaz"	James Tapp	Mo B. Dick	4:00
17.	"What's Up, What's Happening"	James Tapp	KLC	2:39
18.	"Hustlin' Is A Habit" (featuring Steady Mobb'n)	James Tapp; Crooked Eye; Billy Bathgate	O'Dell	3:29
19.	"Getting Real" (featuring Silkk The Shocker, Fiend & Full Blooded)	James Tapp; Ricky Jones; Full Blooded; Vyshonne Miller	KLC	3:52
20.	"N.L. Party" (featuring Master P, Silkk The Shocker, Full Blooded, Tre-Nitty, Gambino Family, Big Ed, Prime Suspects, Mac, Kane & Abel, Magic & Snoop Dogg)	James Tapp; Percy Miller; Vyshonne Miller; Full Blooded; Trenitty; Gotti; P'heno; Edward Knight; Glock; New-9; Uzi; McKinley Phipps; Daniel Garcia; David Garcia; Awood Johnson Jr.; Cordozar Broadus	Mo B. Dick	4:51

== Charts ==
=== Weekly charts ===
Chart (1998)	Peak position
US Billboard 200	13
US Top R&B/Hip-Hop Albums (Billboard)	4

=== Year-end charts ===
Chart (1998)	Position
US Top R&B/Hip-Hop Albums (Billboard)	99
