= 7 Sins (album) =

The 7 Sins

Studio album by Kane & Abel
- Released: October 8, 1996
- Studio: No Limit Studios; Spiral Studios
- Genre: Hip-hop
- Label: No Limit; Priority
- Producer: Carlos Stephens; Grizz; KLC; Mo B. Dick

Kane & Abel chronology
Keep Your Eyes Open (1995)	The 7 Sins (1996)	Am I My Brother's Keeper (1998)

Professional ratings
Review scores
Source	Rating
AllMusic	2/5 stars

The 7 Sins is the second studio album by American hip-hop duo Kane & Abel. It was released on October 8, 1996, via No Limit/Priority Records. Recording sessions took place at No Limit Studios and at Spiral Studios in Los Angeles. Production was handled by KLC, Mo B. Dick, Carlos Stephens and Grizz, with Master P serving as executive producer. It features guest appearances from Master P, Mia X, Mo B. Dick, Mac, Skandalus and Steph.

In the United States, the album debuted at number 179 on the Billboard 200, number 29 on the Top R&B/Hip-Hop Albums and number 11 on the Heatseekers Albums charts. It was supported by the promotional single "Gangstafied".

== Track listing ==
No.	Title	Writer(s)	Producer(s)	Length
1.	"Gangstafied" (featuring Master P and Mo B. Dick)	Daniel Garcia; David Garcia; Percy Miller; Raymond Emile Poole	Mo B. Dick
2.	"This Is the Life"	Daniel Garcia; David Garcia	Mo B. Dick
3.	"Black Jesus" (featuring Master P)	Daniel Garcia; David Garcia; Miller	KLC
4.	"Git'n Paid" (featuring Mo B. Dick)	Daniel Garcia; David Garcia; Poole	Mo B. Dick
5.	"Basement Session" (featuring Skandalus, Steph and Mia X)	Skandalus; Steph; Mia Young	KLC
6.	"That's How It's Gon' Happen 2 U"	Daniel Garcia; David Garcia	KLC
7.	"Between Us"	Daniel Garcia; David Garcia	Grizz
8.	"God & Gunz" (featuring Mac)	Daniel Garcia; McKinley Phipps Jr.	Mo B. Dick
9.	"3/2 Murder 1"	Daniel Garcia; David Garcia	KLC
10.	"Abortion"	Daniel Garcia; David Garcia	Carlos Stephens
11.	"Jealous Again" (featuring Mia X)	Daniel Garcia; David Garcia; Young	KLC

== Personnel ==
- Daniel "Kane" Garcia — vocals (tracks: 1–4, 6–11)
- David "Abel" Garcia — vocals (tracks: 1–4, 6, 7, 9–11)
- Percy "Master P" Miller — vocals (tracks: 1, 3), executive producer
- Raymond "Mo B. Dick" Poole — vocals (tracks: 1, 4), producer, recording & mixing (tracks: 1, 2, 4, 8), editing
- Skandalus — vocals (track 5)
- Steph — vocals (track 5)
- Mia "Mia X" Young — vocals (tracks: 5, 11)
- McKinley "Mac" Phipps Jr. — vocals (track 8)
- Craig "KLC" Lawson — producer (tracks: 3, 5, 6, 9, 11), recording & mixing (tracks: 3, 5, 6, 7, 9, 11)
- Derek "Grizz" Edwards — producer, recording & mixing (track 7)
- Carlos Stephens — producer, recording & mixing (track 10)
- Steve Hall — mastering
- Craig Bazile — editing
- Leslie Henderson — cover photo

== Charts ==
Chart (1996)	Peak position
US Billboard 200	179
US Top R&B/Hip-Hop Albums (Billboard)	29
US Heatseekers Albums (Billboard)	11
