= Kane & Abel (group) =

American hip hop duo

- Also known as: Double Vision
- Origin: New Orleans, Louisiana, U.S.
- Genre: Southern hip hop
- Years active: 1995–present
- Labels: No Limit; Priority; Elektra; Geffen; MCA; Entertainment Solutions; E1
- Members: Daniel "Kane" Garcia; David "Abel" Garcia

Kane & Abel is an American hip hop duo formed by identical twin brothers Daniel and David Garcia that were founded by Master P in late 1995. They were best known for their time with No Limit Records.

== Music career ==
=== 1995: Keep Your Eyes Open ===
In early 1995, Kane & Abel signed to independent label Doral Records as Double Vision, they then released their debut album, Keep Your Eyes Open.

=== 1996: 7 Sins ===
In 1996, Kane & Abel signed to Master P's record label No Limit Records. On October 8, 1996, they released their second album and first for No Limit entitled, 7 Sins. It was moderately successful, peaking at No. 179 on the Billboard 200 and No. 29 on the Top R&B/Hip-Hop Albums charts.

=== 1998: Am I My Brother's Keeper ===
On July 7, 1998, Kane & Abel released their third album, Am I My Brother's Keeper. It was successful, selling 250,000 copies its first week, and peaked at No. 5 on the Billboard 200 and No. 1 on the Top R&B/Hip-Hop Albums charts.

=== 1999: Rise To Power ===
In 1999, Kane & Abel left from No Limit Records and started their own label entitled, Most Wanted Empire, later securing a new label deal with Elektra Records. On September 21, 1999, Kane & Abel released their fourth album, Rise to Power. It peaked at No. 61 on the Billboard 200 and No. 11 on the Top R&B/Hip-Hop Albums chart.

=== 2000-02: Most Wanted & The Last Ones Left ===
In 2000, Kane & Abel secured a new label deal with Geffen and MCA. On September 26, 2000, they released their fifth album, Most Wanted. It peaked at No. 194 on the Billboard 200 and No. 40 on the Top R&B/Hip-Hop Albums chart. On October 15, 2002, Kane & Abel released their fifth album, The Last Ones Left via Entertainment Solutions. This was because Kane & Abel were dropped from Geffen and MCA due to their legal issues at the time. The album failed to chart on any of the Billboard's listing, partly due their incarceration at the time.

=== 2010: Back On Money ===
In 2010, Kane & Abel secured a new label deal with E1 Music. On September 26, 2010, their sixth album Back On Money was issued and was their first in six years.

== Writing ==
On April 1, 1999, Kane & Abel released their first written novel entitled Eyes of a Killer/Behind Enemy Lines.

== Legal issues ==
In 1999, the Garcias became entangled in a federal case involving the activities of convicted New Orleans drug lord Richard Pena. Investigators alleged that they distributed cocaine for Pena. During the investigation, they were asked to testify against Percy Miller (Master P), but refused, and Miller was never charged in the case. In June (two years after Pena had pled guilty on his own), the Garcias agreed to a plea bargain allowing them to plead guilty to drug possession with intent to distribute. Under the agreement, they served six months in a prison boot camp and the rest of the 24-month sentence in a halfway house, or home detention. On May 7, 2001, the brothers' lawyers reached an agreement with prosecutors in which they admitted to committing misprision of felony, by refusing to report to federal agents about Pena's activities, for which they were sentenced to three years in jail on September 14, 2001.

== Discography ==
=== Studio albums ===
List of studio albums, with selected chart positions
Title	Album details	Peak chart positions		Certifications
Title	Album details	US	US R&B	Certifications
Keep Your Eyes Open (as Double Vision)	Released: March 13, 1995; Label: Doral; Format: CD, Cassette, MD, LP	—	—	
7 Sins	Released: October 8, 1996; Label: No Limit, Priority; Format: CD, MD, LP	179	29	
Am I My Brother's Keeper	Released: July 7, 1998; Label: No Limit, Priority; Format: CD, MD, LP	5	1	RIAA: Gold
Rise to Power	Released: September 21, 1999; Label: Most Wanted, Elektra; Format: CD, MD, LP	61	11	
Most Wanted	Released: September 26, 2000; Label: Most Wanted, Geffen, MCA; Format: CD, MD, LP	194	40	
The Last Ones Left	Released: October 15, 2002; Label: Most Wanted, Entertainment Solutions; Format: CD, MD, LP	—	—	
Back On Money	Released: September 28, 2010; Label: Most Wanted, E1; Format: CD, MD, LP	—	—	

=== Collaboration albums ===
List of albums, with selected chart positions
Title	Album details	Peak chart positions	
Title	Album details	US	US R&B
Welcome Home (with The Most Wanted Boys)	Released: July 22, 2003; Label: Most Wanted; Format: CD, MD, LP	—	75

=== Soundtrack albums ===
List of soundtrack albums, with selected chart positions and certifications
Title	Album details	Peak chart positions		Certifications
Title	Album details	US	US R&B	Certifications
I'm Bout It (with Various artists)	Released: May 13, 1997; Label: No Limit, Priority; Formats: CD, MD, LP	4	1	RIAA: Platinum
I Got the Hook Up (with Various artists)	Released: April 7, 1998; Label: No Limit, Priority; Format: CD, MD, LP	3	1	RIAA: Platinum
Foolish (with Various artists)	Released: March 23, 1999; Label: No Limit, Priority; Format: CD, digital download, LP	32	10	RIAA: Gold

=== Compilation albums ===
List of albums, with selected chart positions
Title	Album details	Peak chart positions	
Title	Album details	US	US R&B
We Can't Be Stopped (with No Limit)	Released: September 28, 1998; Label: No Limit, Priority; Formats: CD, LP	19	2
Street Legends: The Underground Tapes	Released: October 26, 2004; Label: Entertainment Solutions; Formats: CD, MD, LP	—	—

== Singles ==
=== As lead artist ===
List of singles as lead artist, with selected chart positions and certifications, showing year released and album name
Title	Year	Peak chart positions			Album
Title	Year	US	US R&B	US Rap	Album
"Gangstafied" (featuring Master P & Mo B. Dick)	1996	—	—	—	7 Sins
"Time After Time" (featuring Master P & O'Dell)	1998	—	—	18	Am I My Brother's Keeper
"Straight Thuggin'" (featuring Twista & Solé)	1999	—	—	—	Rise to Power
"Shake It Like a Dog" (featuring 5th Ward Weebie & PNC)	2000	—	57	5	Most Wanted
"Toot It Up" (featuring 5th Ward Weebie & Hotboy Ronald)	2000	—	—	—	Most Wanted
"Quick 2 Buss"	2000	—	—	—	Most Wanted
"Excursionz"	2000	—	—	—	Most Wanted
"Slide It Off" (featuring 5th Ward Weebie)	2000	—	—	—	Most Wanted
"Super Clean" (featuring Lil Boosie)	2010	—	—	—	Back On Money
"Toot It Up" (featuring Slim of 112 & Steve O)	2010	—	—	—	Back On Money
"Big Shot" (featuring Yung Joc)	2010	—	—	—	Back On Money

=== As featured artist ===
List of singles as featured artist, with selected chart positions, showing year released and album name
Title	Year	Peak chart positions			Album
Title	Year	US	US R&B	US Rap	Album
"Hot Boys and Girls" (Master P featuring Mystikal, Mia X, Silkk the Shocker and Kane & Abel)	1999	—	87	—	MP da Last Don

== Guest appearances ==
- 1997
1. "Pop Goes My 9" off the TRU album Tru 2 da Game
2. "West to South' off the Steady Mobb'n album Pre-Meditated Drama
3. "For Realz" off the I'm Bout It soundtrack
4. "Mama's Family" of the Mia X album Unlady Like
5. "5 Hollow points" of the Mr. Serv-On album Life Insurance
6. "Throw 'em Up" off the Master P album Ghetto D
- 1998
1. "What Gangstas Do" off the Silkk The Shocker album Charge It 2 da Game
2. "Soldiers" off the C-Murder album Life or Death
3. "Tell Me What You're Lookin' For" off the I Got The Hook Up soundtrack
4. "What Cha Mean" off the Fiend album There's One in Every Family
5. "N.L. Party" off the Soulja Slim album Give It 2 'Em Raw
6. "Hot Boys and Girls" off the Master P album MP da Last Don
7. "Wooo" off the Mac album Shell Shocked
8. "Gimpin'" off the Magic album Sky's the Limit
9. "Money Makes.." off the Prime Suspects album Guilty 'til Proven Innocent
10. "Puttin' It Down" off the Mia X album Mama Drama
11. "It's a Riot" off the We Can't Be Stopped compilation
- 1999
1. "Tank Nigga" off the Mr. Serv-On album Da Next Level
2. "Ghetto Boy" off the C-Murder album Bossalinie
3. "Yes Indeed" off the Foolish soundtrack
- 2001
1. "Fearless" off the Graveyard Soldjas album, 3 Time Losers
2. "Swamp" off the Off The Tank compilation
3. "Let Me Get Up In Ya" off the Off The Tank compilation
4. "At Yo' Service" off the Lil Italy album Full Blown
5. "Money" of the Partners-N-Crime album, World Premiere
6. "Souljaz" off the 812 Souljaz album, Four Corner Hustler
- 2004
1. "Can I Ball" off the Masa' Smoke album, The Mandingo Warrior
