= Street Life (Fiend album) =

Studio album by Fiend
- Released: July 6, 1999
- Recorded: 1998-1999
- Genre: Hip-hop
- Length: 54:13
- Labels: No Limit; Priority
- Producers: Carlos Stephens; Craig B; KLC; O'Dell

Fiend chronology
There's One in Every Family (1998)	Street Life (1999)	Can I Burn? (2000)

Professional ratings
Review scores
Source	Rating
AllMusic	2.5/5 stars
RapReviews	8/10

Street Life is the third studio album by American rapper Fiend. It was released on July 6, 1999, via No Limit/Priority Records, marking his second and final studio album for the label. Produced by KLC, Carlos Stephens, Craig B. and O'Dell, it features guest appearances from Holloway, Kage, Magic, Mia X, Mystikal and Skull Duggery. In the United States, the album peaked at number 15 on the Billboard 200 and atop the Top R&B/Hip-Hop Albums charts. The album was supported by the lone promotional single "Talk It Like I Bring It".

== Track listing ==
No.	Title	Writer(s)	Producer(s)	Length
1.	"Street Life"	Richard Jones	Carlos Stephens	2:08
2.	"The Rock Show"	Jones	KLC	2:36
3.	"Talk It How I Bring It"	Jones	KLC	2:13
4.	"War 4 Reason"	Jones	KLC	4:58
5.	"Get in 2 It" (featuring Mia X)	Jones; Mia Young	Craig B.	2:49
6.	"Ak'n Bad" (featuring Skull Duggery and Mystikal)	Jones; Andrew Jordan; Michael Tyler	Craig B.	4:29
7.	"Heart of a Ghetto Boy"	Jones	Craig B.	5:38
8.	"Trip to London" (featuring Kage)	Jones; Kage	KLC; O'Dell	2:13
9.	"The Truth Is"	Jones	Carlos Stephens	3:20
10.	"Been Thru It All" (featuring Magic)	Jones; Awood Johnson Jr.	KLC	2:44
11.	"Mr. Whomp Whomp"	Jones	KLC	2:42
12.	"I Was Placed Here" (featuring Holloway)	Jones; Dwayne Lawrence	Carlos Stephens	2:33
13.	"I'm Losing My Mind"	Jones	Craig B.	2:31
14.	"They Don't Hear Me"	Jones	KLC	2:25
15.	"If They Don't Know"	Jones	KLC	0:49
16.	"Walk That Line"	Jones	KLC	5:16
17.	"Waiting on God"	Jones	KLC; O'Dell; Carlos Stephens	4:49
Total length:				54:13

== Personnel ==
- Richard "Fiend" Jones – vocals
- Mia "Mia X" Young – vocals (track 5)
- Andrew "Skull Duggery" Jordan – vocals (track 6)
- Michael "Mystikal" Tyler – vocals (track 6)
- Kage – vocals (track 8)
- Odell Vickers Jr. – background vocals (track 8), producer (tracks: 8, 17)
- Raymond "Mo B. Dick" Poole – background vocals (track 8)
- Awood "Magic" Johnson Jr. – vocals (track 10)
- Dwayne "Holloway" Lawrence – vocals (track 12)
- TIC – Rhodes piano & alto saxophone (track 7)
- Craig Bazile – scratches (track 12), producer (tracks: 5–7, 13)
- Carlos Stephens – producer (tracks: 1, 9, 12, 17)
- Craig Stephen "KLC" Lawson – producer (tracks: 2–4, 8, 10, 11, 14–17)
- Claude Achille – engineering
- Percy "Master P" Miller – executive producer
- Pen & Pixel Graphics, Inc. – artwork, design, graphics
- Leslie Henderson – cover photo

== Charts ==
=== Weekly charts ===
Chart (1999)	Peak position
US Billboard 200	15
US Top R&B/Hip-Hop Albums (Billboard)	1

=== Year-end charts ===
Chart (1999)	Position
US Top R&B/Hip-Hop Albums (Billboard)	74

== See also ==
- List of Billboard number-one R&B albums of 1999
