= Partners-N-Crime =

American hip hop group

- Also known as: PNC; Prime Time
- Origin: New Orleans, Louisiana
- Genres: Hip hop
- Years active: 1993–2005; 2009–present
- Labels: Big Boy, South Coast Music, Rap-A-Lot, UTP
- Members: Kango Slim; Mr. Meanor

Partners-N-Crime is an American hip-hop group from New Orleans, Louisiana, made up of Kango Slimm (born Walter Williams) and Mr. Meana (born Michael Patterson), friends raised in the 17th Ward of New Orleans, where they met in high school through a mutual friend. The duo created their own imprint Crime Lab Entertainment, a division of Juvenile's UTP label.

Kango Slimm and Mr. Meana are now artists on their label, H.I.T.Z. International.

== Discography ==
- 1994: P.N.C
- 1995: Partners-N-Crime Featuring Prime Time - Pump Tha Party (Puttin' In Work)
- 1995: PNC 3
- 1997: Whatcha Wanna Do?
- 1999: We Be Hound'n
- 2001: World Premiere
- 2006: Club Bangaz
- 2009: We Are Legends
- 2014: The Lost Tapes
