= Lil Soldiers =

American rap group

- Origin: New York City
- Genre: Hip hop
- Years active: 1998–1999
- Label: No Limit/Priority
- Past members: Ikeim; Freequan

Lil Soldiers was an American hip-hop duo composed of rappers Ikeim and Freequan. They were signed to No Limit Records.

== Discography ==
=== Studio albums ===
List of studio albums, with selected chart positions
Title	Album details	Peak chart positions	
Title	Album details	US	US R&B
Boot Camp	Released: April 27, 1999; Label: No Limit, Priority; Formats: CD, MD, LP	80	20

== Singles ==
=== As lead artist ===
List of singles as lead artist, with selected chart positions and certifications, showing year released and album name
Title	Year	Peak chart positions			Album
Title	Year	US	US R&B	US Rap	Album
"Close 2 You" (featuring Mo B. Dick)	1998	—	—	—	Mean Green: Major Players Compilation & Boot Camp
"Where the Little Souljas At?"	1998	—	—	—	We Can't Be Stopped & Boot Camp

== See also ==
- No Limit Records
- No Limit Records discography
- Beats by the Pound
