= Prime Suspects =

Rap group from New Orleans

- Origin: 3rd Ward New Orleans, Louisiana
- Genres: Hip-hop
- Years active: 1997–1999
- Labels: No Limit, Priority
- Members: Gangsta T/Glock; E/Uzi
- Past members: Skinew/New-9 (deceased)

Prime Suspects was an American rap group from the 3rd Ward of New Orleans, Louisiana. The group was composed of Glock (also known as Gangsta T), New-9 (also known as Skinew) & Uzi (also known as E), and they were signed to Master P's No Limit Records. The group appeared on many of No Limit's releases including Master P's Ghetto D and Magic's Sky's the Limit, among others. They released their debut album in late 1998 entitled, Guilty Til Proven Innocent, but it failed to live up to the success of some of No Limit's other albums, peaking at only #36 on the Billboard 200. The group disbanded shortly after (New-9 was a part of TRU Records during 2000-2002).

Damien Leroy "Skinew/New-9" Dixon died on August 2, 2021 at Ochsner Baptist Hospital in New Orleans at age 46.

== Discography ==
=== Studio albums ===
List of studio albums, with selected chart positions
Title	Album details	Peak chart positions	
Title	Album details	US	US R&B
Guilty 'til Proven Innocent	Released: October 6, 1998; Label: No Limit, Priority; Format: CD, Cassette, MD, LP	36	14

=== Compilation albums ===
List of compilation albums, with selected chart positions and certifications
Title	Album details	Peak chart positions		Certifications
Title	Album details	US	US R&B	Certifications
Mean Green: Major Players Compilation (with Various artist)	Released: September 28, 1998; Label: No Limit, Priority; Formats: CD, MD, LP	9	6	RIAA: Gold
We Can't Be Stopped (with No Limit)	Released: December 8, 1998; Label: No Limit, Priority; Formats: CD, MD, LP	19	2	RIAA: Platinum

== Singles ==
=== As lead artist ===
List of singles as lead artist, with selected chart positions and certifications, showing year released and album name
Title	Year	Peak chart positions			Album
Title	Year	US	US R&B	US Rap	Album
"Liquidation Of The Ghetto" (featuring Mystikal, O'Dell and Ms. Peaches)	1998	-	-	10	Guilty 'til Proven Innocent

== See also ==
- No Limit Records
- No Limit Records discography
- Beats by the Pound
