= KLC =

American record producer, DJ and drummer (born 1969)

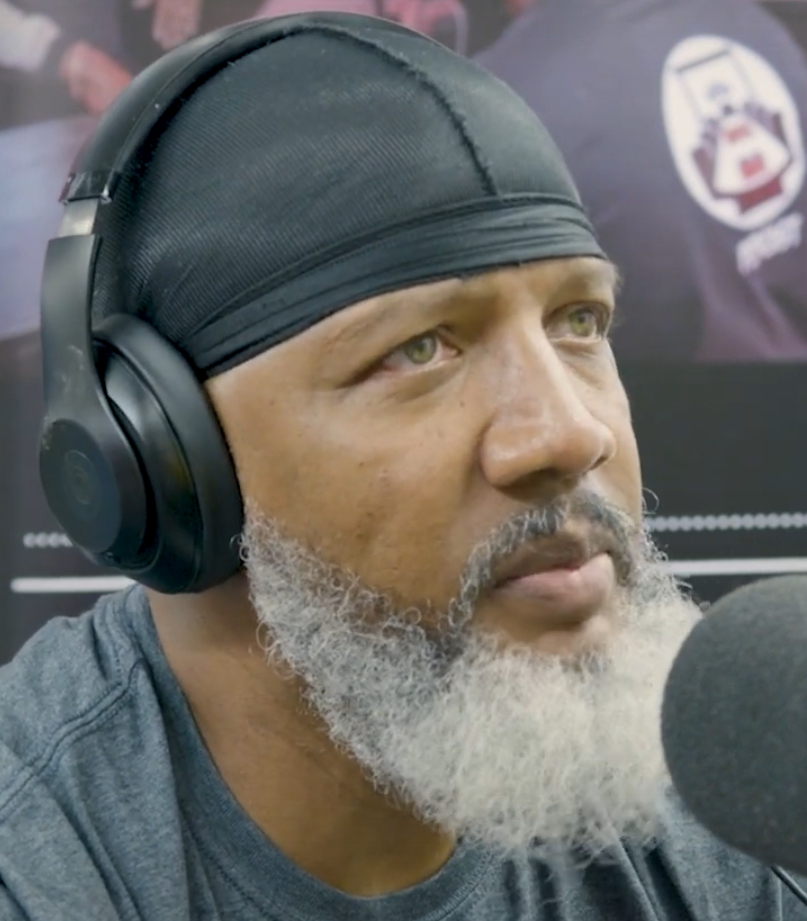
- KLC in 2023

Background information
- Born: Craig Stephen Lawson; July 15, 1969 (age 57); New Orleans, Louisiana, U.S.
- Genres: Southern hip-hop; bounce; trap
- Occupations: Record producer; songwriter; Disc jockey; drummer
- Instrument: Roland TR-808
- Years active: 1987–present
- Labels: Parkway Pumpin Records (1991-1994); No Limit Records; Priority Records (1995-1999); Asylum Records(2006); Overdose Entertainment (1999-2020); Overdose Empire (2021); Medicine Men, LLC.

Craig Stephen Lawson (born July 15, 1969), known professionally as KLC, is an American record producer, DJ and drummer. He found fame as a member of No Limit Records' in-house production team Beats by the Pound. Since leaving the label, he has been a member of the Medicine Men and has his own record label Overdose Entertainment aka Overdose Empire.

== Early years ==
Lawson grew up in the Melpomene Projects in New Orleans' Third Ward. His father was a saxophonist, and KLC took up music as well. Nicknamed the Drum Major even before he joined the band at Green Middle School, KLC became strongly attached to the cadences of the marching band's snare — the sound would later influence his hip-hop beats. In high school, KLC got into breakin', one of his rivals being Michael "Mystikal Mike" Tyler. Tyler would ultimately become a long-term musical associate.

After graduating high school, KLC and his friend Dartanian "MC Dart" Stovall started recording in a makeshift studio in the basement with a Roland TR-808 drum machine at KLC's home. Both decided to quit their full-time, hourly jobs and devote their time to making music. They pooled their last paychecks and completed their first cassette. From these modest means, the teens established Parkway Pumpin' Records.

== Parkway Pumpin' ==
On Parkway Pumpin' there were no contracts, and artists including KLC himself often simultaneously worked at other labels. In 1994, KLC played keyboards and 39 Posse produced EXD's No Elevation for In the House Records. Mystikal recorded his debut album with Big Boy Records, where KLC also produced a track for veteran New Orleans rapper Sporty T. In 1995, Magnolia Slim a.k.a. Soulja Slim recorded The Dark Side EP (produced by KLC and featuring 6 Shot) at Hype Enough. Fiend followed Mystikal to Big Boy Records and recorded his debut album on that label.

== Discography ==
From 1988, KLC is credited (solo and with other Medicine Men team members) on close to 300 studio recordings covering over 100 studio albums. Lawson's RIAA accolades include eighteen gold albums, twelve platinum albums, four double-platinum albums, two triple-platinum albums, and one quadruple-platinum album as well as two gold singles, two platinum singles and one double-platinum single. Lawson has two Grammy nominations, both at the 45th Annual Grammy Awards for Best Rap Album (Word of Mouf by Ludacris and Tarantula by Mystikal) and two BMI Awards—one for the hit single "Move Bitch" by Ludacris, and one for the associated album Word of Mouf.
