= No Limit Records =

American record label

- Company logo from 1998–2000
- Parent company: EMI
- Founded: 1991; 35 years ago
- Founder: Master P
- Status: Active
- Distributors: Priority (1995–2001); Universal (2001–2004); Koch Records (2004–2005)
- Genre: Southern hip-hop; bounce; gangsta rap; G-funk
- Country of origin: United States
- Location: Richmond, California (1991–1996); New Orleans, Louisiana (1995–1997); Baton Rouge, Louisiana (1997–2003)
- Official website: trutanksoldiers.com

No Limit Records is an American record company founded in 1991 by rapper and record executive Master P. The label's albums were distributed by Priority Records, Universal and Koch Records. The label included artists such as Snoop Dogg, Mystikal, Romeo Miller, C-Murder, Soulja Slim, Magic, Mac, Mercedes, Fiend, Silkk the Shocker, Mia X and Kane & Abel. Anthony Boswell, head of Bout It Bout It Management, served as the vice president of operations as well as head of management for the label.

In the late 1990s, No Limit Records enjoyed mainstream success with releases such as Master P's Ghetto D, T.R.U.'s Tru 2 da Game, and Snoop Dogg's Da Game Is to Be Sold, Not to Be Told. They were known for quickly producing lengthy albums consisting of up to twenty tracks, numerous guest appearances from labelmates, and packaging of its CDs in cardboard cases, along with garish Pen & Pixel-designed album covers.

== History ==
=== 1991–1995: Beginnings ===
Percy Miller, also known as Master P, began his career distributing his records through a small California Bay Area record label, "No Limit Record Shop", which started out in Richmond.

After signing Oakland rapper Dangerous Dame, who released the EP Escape from the Mental Ward through No Limit, he began working with New Orleans–based talent, starting with Kane & Abel (then known as Double Vision).

=== 1995–1999: Successful years and Priority deal ===
In 1995, Master P officially relocated No Limit to his birthplace of New Orleans, Louisiana, while retaining his brothers and several California rappers like TRU member Big Ed, King George and Calli G on board. He then added local talent to his roster such as Mystikal, Mia X, Kane & Abel and Mr. Serv-On. No Limit then signed a distribution deal with Priority Records, while Master P maintained ownership of his master recordings and recording studio. He became the label's main artist, releasing Ice Cream Man in 1996 and Ghetto D a year later.

By 1997, No Limit had gained momentum with bestselling, if not critically acclaimed, releases from multiple artists. In May 1997, No Limit released the soundtrack to the film I'm Bout It. The album featured appearances from much of the label's roster at the time of its release. In addition to featuring the label's original artists, the album introduced new artists now signed to No Limit. These artists include Baton Rouge, Louisiana artist Young Bleed, Oakland-based pair Steady Mobb'n, R&B quartet and production group Sons of Funk, Mac, Prime Suspects, The Gambino Family, Mercedes and former Big Boy Records artists Mystikal and Fiend. The album was a commercial success, being certified Platinum by the RIAA. No Limit also had success with albums like TRU (Tru 2 Da Game), Mia X's Unlady Like, which went gold despite producing no hit singles, and Mystikal's platinum-selling Unpredictable. That same year, No Limit moved from New Orleans to a corporate headquarters in Baton Rouge, Louisiana. The label also acquired their first marquee name in Snoop Dogg, on the heels of his acrimonious split from Death Row Records. His debut album for No Limit, Da Game Is to Be Sold, Not to Be Told, was the most successful release in the label's history at the time, selling over half a million copies in its first week and certified double platinum in less than three months.

As No Limit's popularity and mainstream coverage increased, so did its roster. The label signed producers DJ Daryl, Randy Jefferson, K-Lou & Dez as well as Master P's main production team, Beats by the Pound (KLC, Mo B. Dick, Craig B, Odell, and Carlos Stephens), in addition to solo artists Soulja Slim, Full Blooded, Magic, Skull Duggery, Short Circuit, Ghetto Commission. Together, the label's artists released 23 albums in 1998, 10 of which achieved platinum status and 11 gold certification, with several serving as the artists' only releases under the label. The year's most successful release was Master P's seventh studio album, MP Da Last Don, released on June 2, 1998. Marketed as his final studio album, the two-disc project contained 29 tracks and featured guest appearances from No Limit labelmates Silkk the Shocker, Fiend, Mystikal, Steady Mobb'n, Sons of Funk, Kane & Abel, Mia X, Mac, and Mo B. Dick. Production was primarily handled by Beats by the Pound. The album debuted at number one on the Billboard 200 after selling 495,000 copies in its first week of release. It was subsequently certified four-times platinum by the RIAA, becoming the best-selling album of Master P's career as well as No Limit's bestselling album.

In January 1999, No Limit Records released Silkk the Shocker’s third studio album, Made Man, which debuted at number one on the US Billboard 200 and was later certified platinum by the Recording Industry Association of America (RIAA). The album features guest appearances from No Limit artists Mystikal, Fiend, Master P (who also served as executive producer), O'Dell, Sons of Funk, C-Murder, The Ghetto Commission, Mia X, and Snoop Dogg. Production was handled by No Limit producers KLC, O'Dell, Carlos Stephens, Craig B., and Sons of Funk. That June, No Limit TRU released their fifth studio album, Da Crime Family, which debuted within the top five of the Billboard 200 and was certified gold by the RIAA.

1999 also saw the departure of many No Limit producers and artists. In 1999, Beats By The Pound members Odell, Craig B, Mo B. Dick, and KLC left No Limit due to a dispute with Master P. As a result, KLC's project, Hits By The Pound, scheduled for a September 14, 1999 release through No Limit, was consequently shelved. Mia X left No Limit and went on a musical hiatus to take care of her family. Kane & Abel were dropped from No Limit in 1999 due to their investigation involving drug activity. Sons of Funk, Steady Mobb'n, Prime Suspects, and The Gambino Family all parted ways with the label.

=== 2000–2003: Roster exodus, decline, The New No Limit, and final years ===
In 2000, 504 Boyz album Goodfellas made it big on the Billboard peaking at #2 on the Billboard 200 making No Limit a small factor in the 2000s, but in 2000 only Master P, Snoop Dogg, C-Murder, Silkk, Magic, and Mac remained from their most celebrated artists. By 2000, Mr. Serv-On and Big Ed had left the label.

In 2001, the label lost Mac to prison after he was convicted of manslaughter in connection to a nightclub shooting; he was ultimately sentenced to thirty years in prison on September 21, 2001. Snoop Dogg had left No Limit after his three-year contract with No Limit expired, and C-Murder distanced himself from No Limit to focus on his own label, TRU Records. In 2001, No Limit's deal with Priority expired, and No Limit subsequently signed with Universal Records for a $10 million distribution deal. After the signing, Master P renamed No Limit to The New No Limit. The New No Limit's roster included Master P, Lil Romeo, Silkk The Shocker, 504 Boyz, Magic, Currensy, and Choppa. Releases on The New No Limit under Universal failed to achieve the same success as the previous incarnation of No Limit.

On December 17, 2003, the company filed for bankruptcy due to various lawsuits; Master P also sold the label's catalog.

== Reorganization ==
In 2001, No Limit left Priority Records and signed a distribution deal with Universal. The label's name was changed to The New No Limit. The first release under the New No Limit banner was Master P's tenth album, Game Face. With Universal, the label also released new albums by the 504 Boyz, Lil' Romeo, Magic and Choppa. In 2004, the reorganized label had moved to Koch Records for distribution. From 2004 to 2005, The New No Limit Records issued new albums by Master P, Silkk the Shocker, C-Murder, Lil' Romeo and the reformed TRU. In 2005, Master P established a new label called Guttar Music Entertainment.

== See also ==
- 504 Boyz
- List of No Limit Records artists
- Beats by the Pound
- Master P
- List of No Limit Records artists
- No Limit Records discography
- List of record labels
