= TRU discography =

- Studio albums: 6
- Compilation albums: 1
- Singles: 3
- Music videos: 4

This article presents the discography of TRU consists of six studio albums, one compilation and three singles.

== Albums ==
=== Studio albums ===
List of albums, with selected chart positions and certifications
Title	Album details	Peak chart positions		Certifications
Title	Album details	US	US R&B	Certifications
Understanding the Criminal Mind	Released: 1992; Label: No Limit, In-A-Minute; Format: CD, cassette, digital download	—	—	
Who's da Killer?	Released: 1993; Label: No Limit; Format: CD, cassette, digital download	—	—	
True	Released: July 25, 1995; Label: No Limit, Priority; Format: CD, LP, cassette, digital download	—	25	
Tru 2 da Game	Released: February 18, 1997; Label: No Limit, Priority; Format: CD, LP, cassette, digital download	8	2	RIAA: 2× Platinum
Da Crime Family	Released: June 1, 1999; Label: No Limit, Priority; Format: CD, LP, cassette, digital download	5	2	RIAA: Gold
The Truth	Released: February 22, 2005; Label: The New No Limit, Koch; Format: CD, LP, digital download	54	15	

=== Compilation albums ===
Title	Album details
The Best of TRU	Released: 2005; Label: No Limit, Priority; Format: CD, digital download

== Singles ==
List of singles, with selected chart positions
Year	Title	Chart positions			Album
Year	Title	US	US R&B	US Rap	Album
1997	"I Always Feel Like" (featuring Mia X and Mo B. Dick)	71	27	11	Tru 2 da Game
1999	"Hoody Hooo"	—	31	2	Da Crime Family
1999	"Tru Homies" (featuring Odell)	—	61	6	Da Crime Family
