= Fiend discography =

The discography for American hip hop musician Fiend.

== Albums ==
=== Studio albums ===
List of studio albums, with selected chart positions
Title	Album details	Peak chart positions		Certifications
Title	Album details	US	US R&B	Certifications
I Won't Be Denied	Released: November 14, 1995; Label: Big Boy; Format: CD, LP	—	—	
There's One in Every Family	Released: May 5, 1998; Label: No Limit, Priority; Format: CD, digital download, LP	8	1	RIAA: Gold
Street Life	Released: July 6, 1999; Label: No Limit, Priority; Format: CD, digital download, LP	15	1	
Street Aint Safe, Vol. 3	Released: July 10, 2015; Label: Fiend, Rapbay, Urbanlife; Format: CD, digital download	—	—	
Thank God Its Fiend (TGIF)	Released: March 19, 2021; Label: FDE; Format: CD, digital download	—	—	

=== Independent albums ===
List of independent albums, with selected chart positions
Title	Album details	Peak chart positions
Title	Album details	US R&B
Can I Burn?	Released: August 22, 2000; Label: Fiend; Format: CD, digital download, LP	52
Can I Burn? 2	Released: May 13, 2003; Label: Fiend; Format: CD, digital download, LP	55
Go Hard or Go Home	Released: August 31, 2004; Label: Fiend; Format: CD, digital download, LP	81
The Addiction: Hope Is Near	Released: June 27, 2006; Label: Fiend; Format: CD, digital download, LP	70
Heart of a Ghetto Boy: Volume 1	Released: August 21, 2015; Label: Fiend; Format: CD, digital download	—

=== Extended plays ===
List of albums, with selected chart positions
Title	Album details	Peak chart positions	
Title	Album details	US	US R&B
Wrapping Papers	Released: January 2, 2014; Label: Fiend, Jet Life; Format: CD, digital download, EP	—	—

=== Collaboration albums ===
List of albums, with selected chart positions
Title	Album details	Peak chart positions	
Title	Album details	US	US R&B
Dat's How It Happen to'M (with Three 6 Mafia as Da Headbussaz)	Released: October 15, 2002; Label: Hypnotize Minds; Format: CD, digital download, LP	98	15
Jet World Order (with Jet Life)	Released: November 29, 2011; Label: Jet Life, iHipHop Distribution; Format: digital download, LP	148	—
Jet World Order 2 (with Jet Life)	Released: November 20, 2012; Label: Jet Life, iHipHop Distribution; Format: digital download, LP	—	38

=== Soundtrack albums ===
List of soundtrack albums, with selected chart positions and certifications
Title	Album details	Peak chart positions		Certifications
Title	Album details	US	US R&B	Certifications
Foolish (with Various artists)	Released: March 23, 1999; Label: No Limit, Priority; Format: CD, digital download, LP	32	10	RIAA: Gold

=== Mixtapes ===
Fiend's mixtapes and details
Title	Mixtape details
Fiend 4 Da Money Vol. 1	Released: April 20, 2008; Label: Fiend; Hosted by Fiend Entertainment
The Bail Out	Released: January 31, 2010; Label: Fiend; Hosted by DJ Ames
Fiend 4 Da Money 2	Released: June 2, 2010; Label: Fiend
Audio Dope: (International Jones)	Released: September 30, 2010; Label: Fiend
Tennis Shoes & Tuxedos (International Jones)	Released: January 26, 2011; Label: Fiend, Jet Life
The Sweetest Hangover (International Jones)	Released: March 15, 2011; Label: Fiend, Jet Life
Life Behind Limo Glass (International Jones)	Released: May 16, 2011; Label: Fiend, Jet Life
Cool Is In Session (International Jones)	Released: July 28, 2011; Label: Fiend, Jet Life
Smokin Champagne (International Jones)	Released: October 17, 2011; Label: Fiend, Jet Life; Hosted by DJ Don Cannon
Iron Chef (with Cookin Soul)	Released: April 19, 2012; Label: Fiend, Jet Life
Lil Ghetto Boy	Released: March 18, 2013; Label: Fiend, Jet Life
The Big Shots (with DeeLow)	Released: February 15, 2014; Label: Fiend, Jet Life; Hosted by DJ Hektik
Capolavoro (International Jones)	Released: April 20, 2014; Label: Fiend, Jet Life; Hosted by DJ SWU

=== Compilation albums ===
List of albums, with selected chart positions
Title	Album details	Peak chart positions	
Title	Album details	US	US R&B
Mean Green: Major Players Compilation (with Various artist)	Released: September 28, 1998; Label: No Limit, Priority; Formats: CD, LP	9	6
We Can't Be Stopped (with No Limit)	Released: September 28, 1998; Label: No Limit, Priority; Formats: CD, LP	19	2
Who U Wit? (with Various artist)	Released: May 25, 1999; Label: No Limit, Priority; Formats: CD, LP	62	22
Ryde or Die Vol. 3: In the "R" We Trust (with Ruff Ryders Entertainment)	Released: December 18, 2001; Label: Ruff Ryders, Interscope; Format: CD, Digital Download	—	—
The Best Of Fiend: Mr. Whomp Whomp	Released: December 4, 2007; Label: Priority; Format: CD, Digital Download	—	—

== Singles ==
=== As lead artist ===
List of singles as lead artist, with selected chart positions and certifications, showing year released and album name
Title	Year	Peak chart positions			Album
Title	Year	US	US R&B	US Rap	Album
"I Won't Be Denied"	1995	—	—	—	I Won't Be Denied
"The Baddest"	1995	—	—	—	I Won't Be Denied
"Take My Pain" (featuring Master P, Silkk The Shocker & Sons of Funk)	1998	—	11	—	There's One in Every Family
"Mr. Whomp Whomp"	1999	—	14	—	Street Life
"Talk It How I Bring It"	1999	—	—	—	Street Life
"On My Job" (featuring Juvenile)	2013	—	—	—	—N/a

=== As featured artist ===
List of singles as featured artist, with selected chart positions and certifications, showing year released and album name
Title	Year	Peak chart positions			Certifications	Album
Title	Year	US	US R&B	US Rap	Certifications	Album
"Make 'Em Say Uhh!" (Master P featuring Silkk the Shocker, Mia X, Fiend and Mystikal)	1998	16	18	6	RIAA: Platinum	Ghetto D
"If It Don't Make $$$..." (Skull Duggery featuring Mo B. Dick, Fiend and Master P)	1998	—	—	—		These Wicked Streets
"Times So Hard" (Young Bleed featuring Master P, Fiend, Mo B. Dick and O'Dell)	1998	—	—	—		My Balls and My Word
"Woof" (Snoop Dogg featuring Fiend and Mystikal)	1999	19	31	—		Da Game Is to Be Sold, Not to Be Told
"Dat Slap" (Rodnae Da Boss featuring Fiend)	2014	—	—	—		—N/a
"Corner Boy" (Hypnotiq featuring Fiend, Boosie Badazz, Mike Jones)	2016	—	—	—		—N/a
