= Mr. Serv-On =

American rapper

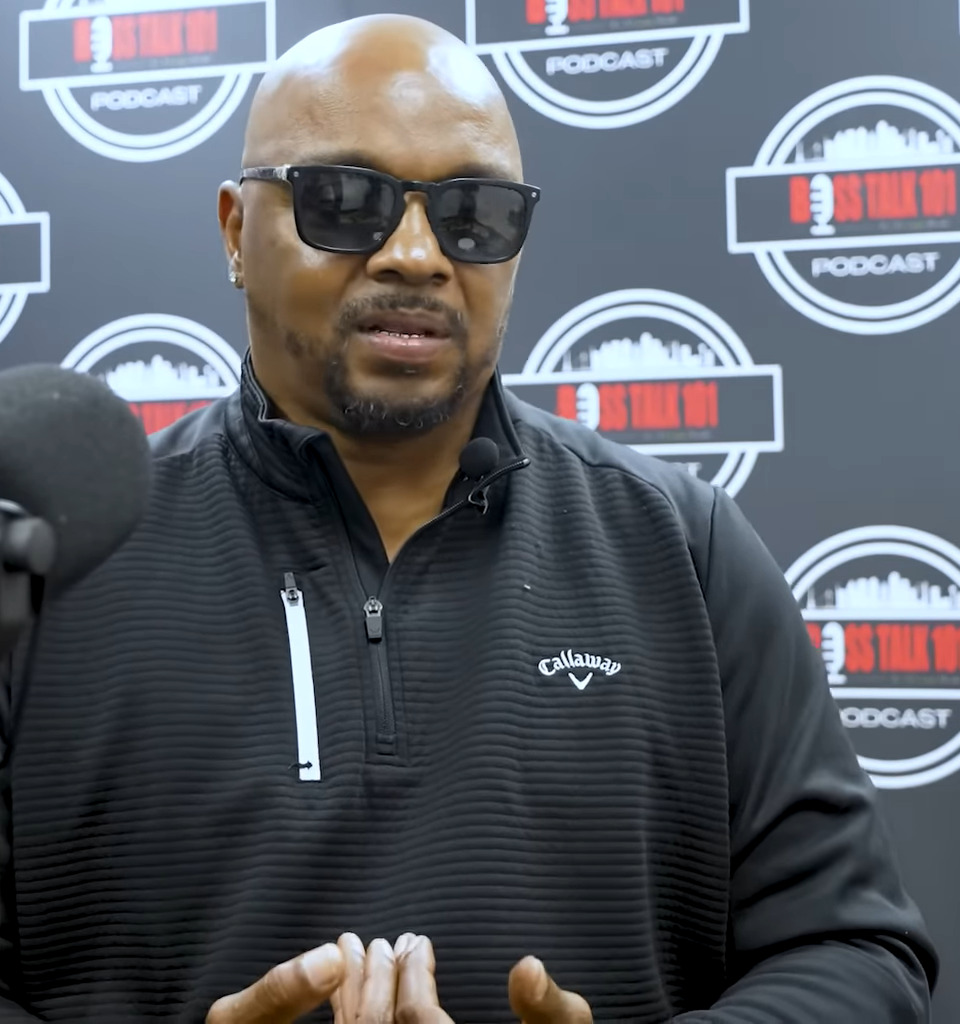
- Mr. Serv-On in 2025

Background information
- Also known as: Serv-On, Serv 4000
- Born: Corey Smith; September 18, 1969 (age 57)
- Origin: New Orleans, Louisiana, U.S.
- Genres: Hip hop; gangsta rap
- Occupation: Rapper
- Years active: 1994–present
- Labels: Lifetyme Entertainment, LLC.; No Limit

Corey Smith (born September 18, 1969), better known by his stage name Mr. Serv-On, is an American rapper from New Orleans, Louisiana. Mr. Serv-On is best known for his time spent with No Limit Records from 1994 to 2000.

== Music career ==
=== Music beginnings ===
A high school friend of Master P, Mr. Serv-On was one of the first rappers signed to Master P's No Limit Records, first appearing on albums by Master P, TRU and Mia X. His first appearance was on Soulja Slim's (then known as Magnolia Slim) album "Soulja fa Lyfe", in 1994.

=== TRU, No Limit, Life Insurance and Da Next Level ===
On August 12, 1997, Mr Serv-On's debut studio album, Life Insurance was released. Life Insurance met with commercial and critical success, peaking at number 23 on the US charts and number 5 on the R&B charts; in 2013, it was ranked 20th on a list of the top 25 No Limit releases.

On February 16, 1999, Mr. Serv-On would release his second studio album Da Next Level it would be released to a bigger commercial success, making it to number 1 on the R&B charts selling 297,000 copies in its first week. The album was certified Platinum. In 2000, Mr. Serv-On left No Limit and launched his own independent label, Lifetyme Entertainment.

=== War Is Me, Pt. 1: Battle Decisions, Take a Sip and No More Questions ===
On June 20, 2000, Mr. Serv-On would release his third studio album and first independent album titled War Is Me, Pt. 1: Battle Decisions, it only made it to number 75 on the R&B charts. On October 30, 2001, Mr. Serv-On would release his fourth album titled Take a Sip via Lifetime, K.O.K., Street Level, the album would fail to make any of the Billboard charts. On March 18, 2003, Mr. Serv-On released his fifth album and second independent album titled No More Questions via Lifetime, the album would fail to make any of the Billboard charts.

=== Life Insurance 2 (Heart Muzik) and Gangsta 1 More Time ===
On March 18, 2003, Mr. Serv-On would release his sixth album and third independent album titled Life Insurance 2 (Heart Muzik) via Lifetyme, the album would fail to make any of the Billboard charts. Mr. Serv-On signed to Killa C's Dirty Thug Recordz in 2009 and would release his seventh album titled Gangsta 1 More Timeon November 17, 2009, the album would fail to make any of the Billboard charts. On March 18, 2003, Mr. Serv-On would release his eighth album titled Internet Platinum via Lifetyme, Hustle Blooc the album would fail to make any of the Billboard charts.

=== Street Dreams and The Fallen Soldier ===
On December 20, 2013, he announced the release of his new mixtape "Guaparation Canal", which was slated to be released in February 2014.

On March 4, 2014, Revolution Entertainment would release the collaborative album "Known Associates" by SC and Mr. Serv-On.

On September 18, Serv-On announced his next release would be Boss Certified with a release date of October 28, 2014. This album will be distributed through Serv-On`s own label, Hot City Music. On December 2, 2014, Mr. Serv-On released his ninth album Street Dreams, this album was released through Timez Up. Ent. and was executive produced by DJ Suckafree. On June 19, 2015 Mr. Serv-On would release his tenth album titled The Fallen Soldier via Hot City Music and Timez Up.

== Other ventures ==
=== Acting career ===
Mr. Serv-On appeared in the movie "I'm Bout It" in 1997, and in a documentary 10 years later called "Grittin 2 Get It In Tha Rock." In 2008, Mr. Serv-On was interviewed for the Underground Kingz Magazine DVD. In 2014, Mr. Serv-On appeared in the documentary "We Are One: Street Music of New Orleans."

=== Author ===
In 2008, Mr. Serv-On wrote a dating book for black women.

== Philanthropy ==
In October 2014, Mr. Serv-On participated in a gun buy-back program in New Orleans.

== Discography ==
=== Studio albums ===
List of studio albums, with selected chart positions
Title	Album details	Peak chart positions	
Title	Album details	US	US R&B
Life Insurance	Released: August 5, 1997; Label: No Limit, Priority; Format: CD, LP	23	5
Da Next Level	Released: February 16, 1999; Label: No Limit, Priority; Format: CD, MD, LP	14	1
Take a Sip	Released: October 30, 2001; Label: Lifetyme, K.O.K., Street Level; Format: CD, MD, LP	—	—
Gangsta 1 More Time	Released: November 17, 2009; Label: Lifetyme, Dirty Thug; Format: CD, MD, LP	—	—
Internet Platinum	Released: May 31, 2011; Label: Lifetyme, Hustle Blooc; Format: MD, LP	—	—
Street Dreams	Released: December 2, 2014; Label: Hot City, Timez Up; Format: MD, LP	—	—
The Fallen Soldier	Released: June 19, 2015; Label: Hot City, Timez Up; Format: MD, LP	—	—

=== Independent albums ===
List of independent albums, with selected chart positions
Title	Album details	Peak chart positions
Title	Album details	US R&B
War Is Me, Pt. 1: Battle Decisions	Released: June 20, 2000; Label: Lifetime; Format: CD, MD, LP	75
No More Questions	Released: March 18, 2003; Label: Lifetime; Format: CD, MD, LP	—
Life Insurance 2 (Heart Muzik)	Released: May 27, 2008; Label: Lifetyme; Format: CD, MD, LP	—

=== Extended Play's ===
List of EP's, with selected chart positions
Title	Album details	Peak chart positions	
Title	Album details	US	US R&B
Show & Prove (with J.P.)	Released: March 4, 2014; Label: Money By Any Meanz; Format: CD, EP	—	—

=== Collaboration albums ===
List of collaboration albums, with selected chart positions
Title	Album details	Peak chart positions	
Title	Album details	US	US R&B
Known Associates (with SC)	Released: March 4, 2014; Label: Revolution Entertainment; Format: CD, LP	—	—

=== Soundtrack albums ===
List of soundtrack albums, with selected chart positions and certifications
Title	Album details	Peak chart positions		Certifications
Title	Album details	US	US R&B	Certifications
I'm Bout It (with Various artists)	Released: May 13, 1997; Label: No Limit/Priority; Formats: CD, MD, LP	4	1	RIAA: Gold
I Got the Hook Up (with Various artists)	Released: April 7, 1998; Label: No Limit/Priority; Format: CD, MD, LP	3	1	RIAA: Platinum
Foolish (with Various artists)	Released: March 23, 1999; Label: No Limit/Priority; Format: CD, digital download, LP	32	10	RIAA: Gold

=== Mixtapes ===
Mr. Serv-On's mixtapes and details
Title	Mixtape details
Guaparation Canal	Released: September 10, 2014; Label: Hot City Music; Retail mixtape
Boss Certified	Released: July 31, 2015; Label: Hot City Music; Hosted by DJ Willie Flight

=== Compilation albums ===
List of compilation albums, with selected chart positions and certifications
Title	Album details	Peak chart positions		Certifications
Title	Album details	US	US R&B	Certifications
Down South Hustlers: Bouncin' and Swingin' (with Various artist)	Released: October 31, 1995; Label: No Limit/Priority; Formats: CD, LP	139	13	
West Coast Bad Boyz II (with Various artist as West Coast Bad Boyz)	Released: January 10, 1997; Label: No Limit/Priority; Formats: CD, LP	17	6	
Mean Green: Major Players Compilation (with Various artist)	Released: September 28, 1998; Label: No Limit/Priority; Formats: CD, LP	9	6	RIAA: Gold
Who U Wit? (with Various artist)	Released: May 25, 1999; Label: No Limit/Priority; Formats: CD, LP	62	22	

== Singles ==
=== As lead artist ===
List of singles as lead artist, with selected chart positions and certifications, showing year released and album name
Title	Year	Peak chart positions			Album
Title	Year	US	US R&B	US Rap	Album
"My Best Friend " (featuring Master P)	1997	—	—	—	Life Insurance
"From N.Y. To N.O." (featuring Big Pun)	1999	—	—	—	Da Next Level
"Gotta Get That"	2001	—	—	—	Take a Sip
"Calmdown Na"	2001	—	—	—	Take a Sip
"Hot"	2007	—	—	—	—N/a
"Stacks Up"	2008	—	—	—	Life Insurance 2 (Heart Muzik)
"Crazy" (featuring Izzy White)	2008	—	—	—	Life Insurance 2 (Heart Muzik)
"Like Aww" (featuring Trouble)	2014	—	—	—	—N/a

=== As featured artist ===
List of singles as featured artist, with selected chart positions and certifications, showing year released and album name
Title	Year	Peak chart positions			Album
Title	Year	US	US R&B	US Rap	Album
"I Wanna Be With You" (Mia X featuring Master P and Mr. Serv-On)	1996	—	—	—	—N/a

== Guest appearances ==
Year	Artists	Album
1994	Magnolia Slim	Soulja fa Lyfe
1995	TRU	True
1995	Tre-8	Ghetto Stories
1995	Various Artists	Down South Hustlers: Bouncin' and Swingin'
1996	Various Artists	The Substitute
1996	Master P	Ice Cream Man
1997	Various Artists	West Coast Bad Boyz II
1997	TRU	Tru 2 da Game
1997	Various Artists	I'm Bout It
1997	Various Artists	Million Dollar Dream: The High Powered Double Album
1997	DJ Screw	Chapter 188: Pay Like You Weigh
1997	Mia X	Unlady Like
1997	Master P	Ghetto D
1998	C-Murder	Life or Death
1998	Various Artists	I Got the Hook Up
1998	Soulja Slim	Give It 2 'Em Raw
1998	Master P	MP da Last Don
1998	Mac	Shell Shocked
1998	Kane & Abel	Am I My Brother's Keeper
1998	Big Ed	The Assassin
1998	Various Artists	Mean Green Major Players Compilation
1998	Skull Duggery	These Wicked Streets
1998	Prime Suspects	Guilty 'til Proven Innocent
1998	Gambino Family	Ghetto Organized
1998	Mia X	Mama Drama
1998	Steady Mobb'n	Black Mafia
1998	Ghetto Commission	Wise Guys
1998	Various Artists	We Can't Be Stopped
1999	C-Murder	Bossalinie
1999	Various Artists	Foolish
1999	Mo B. Dick	Gangsta Harmony
1999	Various Artists	Who U Wit?
1999	TRU	Da Crime Family
1999	Mercedes	Rear End
1999	DJ Screw	Chapter 173: 99 Live
2000	Big Ed	Special Forces
2000	Various Artists	Young Southern Playaz, Vol. 3
2000	Three 6 Mafia	When the Smoke Clears: Sixty 6, Sixty 1
2000	5th Ward Weebie	Ghetto Platinum
2000	Spice 1	The Playa Rich Project
2000	Wicket	Shop with Me
2000	Clout Nine	G to the Game
2001	E-Dubb	The Prezident
2001	Oak Cliff Assassin	Target Practice
2001	Lou Calhoun	Stukk N Da System
2001	Iced Out	Raw And Unkut
2001	Various Artists	Off the Tank Compilation
2001	Poetic-1 Presents	Unforgiven 2: Addicted
2001	Various Artists	Somethin' For The Whodi's
2001	Big Ed	Edward Lee Knight 1971–2001
2001	Various Artists	Legends, Gangsters & Bosses
2002	Spice 1	The Playa Rich Project 2
2002	Thug Dirt Presents	Texxxas Underground Vol. 2
2002	Spice 1	Thug Disease
2002	Brotha Lynch Hung	The Appearances: Book 1
2002	Thug Dirt	Texxxas Undaground, Vol. 2
2002	Various Artists	Crossing State Lines: Chopped and Screwed, Vol. 1
2003	Various Artists	Thuggin', Ballin' and Pimpin'
2003	Hard Knox	This Is Real
2003	Rob Run	South Rituals
2003	Various Artists	How to Hustle
2003	Various Artists	Kings of the South, Vol. 1
2004	DJ Screw	Chapter 113 - Barre
2004	Ghetto Idols	Ghetto Idols, Vol. 1
2005	Ace Deuce	What Do You See? The Block Star!
2005	TRU	The Best of TRU
2006	Praise Money	The Bigger the Risk, The Bigger the Profit
2006	Big Wheel	Texas Most Wanted: Tha Compilation
2006	Ace Deuce	The Block All Star
2006	KLC	The Drum Major
2007	Various Artists	No Limit Greatest Hits Vol. 1
2007	Fiend	The Best Of Fiend: Mr. Whomp Whomp
2007	Various Artists	I'm Bout It [Mixed Repertoire]
2008	Project Boss	Meeting of Da Bosses

== Filmography ==
1997	I'm Bout It
1998	I Got The Hook Up
2007	Grittin 2 Get It In Tha Rock
2008	Underground Kingz Magazine DVD

== See also ==
- No Limit Records
- Beats by the Pound
