= The Best of TRU =

Compilation album by TRU
- Released: October 4, 2005
- Recorded: 1995–1999
- Genre: Southern hip hop, gangsta rap
- Label: No Limit/Priority Records
- Producer: Beats By The Pound

TRU chronology
The Truth (2004)	The Best of TRU (2005)

The Best of TRU is a compilation album released by rap group, TRU. It was released on October 4, 2005, for No Limit and Priority Records and was produced by Beats By The Pound. The album managed to make it to #91 on the Top R&B/Hip-Hop Albums. The album contains material from the albums Tru 2 da Game, True, and Da Crime Family.

Professional ratings
Review scores
Source	Rating
Allmusic	4/5 stars

== Track listing ==
1. "No Limit Soldiers" - 7:04 (from the album Tru 2 da Game)
2. "I'm 'Bout It, 'Bout It" - 5:30 (from the album True)
3. "There Dey Go" - 4:38 (from the album Tru 2 da Game)
4. "Hoody Hooo" - 3:26 (from the album Da Crime Family)
5. "Freak Hoes" - 3:49 (from the album Tru 2 da Game)
6. "Swamp Nigga" - 5:14 (from the album Tru 2 da Game)
7. "I Always Feel Like" - 5:06 (from the album Tru 2 da Game)
8. "FEDz" - 5:41 (from the album Tru 2 da Game)
9. "Fuck Them Hoes" - 4:45 (from the album True)
10. "Gangstas Make the World" - 4:55 (from the album Tru 2 da Game)
11. "We Riders" - 2:18 (from the album Da Crime Family)
12. "TRU Homies" - 3:34 (from the album Da Crime Family)
13. "Mobbin' Through My Hood" - 3:37 (from the album True)
14. "Tru 2 da Game" - 4:53 (from the album Tru 2 da Game)
15. "Would You Take a Bullet for Your Homie" - 4:49 (from the album True)
16. "Final Ride" - 6:00 (from the album Tru 2 da Game)
