= The Assassin (album) =

Studio album by Big Ed
- Released: September 1, 1998
- Genre: Gangsta rap
- Length: 1:05:43
- Labels: No Limit; Priority
- Producers: Master P (exec.); Beats By The Pound; Les G; Mr. Mixx

Big Ed chronology
The Assassin (1998)	Special Forces (2000)

Professional ratings
Review scores
Source	Rating
AllMusic	2.5/5 stars

The Assassin is the debut studio album by American rapper Big Ed. It was released on September 1, 1998, through No Limit/Priority Records. The production was handled by Beats by the Pound, as well as Mr. Mixx and Les G. It features guest appearances from Mia X, Silkk the Shocker, C-Murder, Mac, Master P, Mystikal, Fiend, Mr. Serv-On, Full Blooded, Gambino Family, Magic, Mo B. Dick, O'Dell, Snoop Dogg and Steady Mobb'n. The album peaked at number 16 on the Billboard 200 and number 3 on the Top R&B Albums in the United States.

== Track listing ==
No.	Title	Producer(s)	Length
1.	"Intro"		1:33
2.	"My Entourage" (featuring Silkk the Shocker and Mystikal)	Les G	4:54
3.	"I'm Yo Soldier" (featuring Silkk the Shocker and Master P)	MP	4:12
4.	"Rodeo" (featuring Silkk the Shocker and Mia X)	Mr. Mixx	4:22
5.	"Make Some Room" (featuring Mia X, Mac, C-Murder and Snoop Dogg)	KLC	5:27
6.	"We Some" (featuring Steady Mobb'n)	MP	3:34
7.	"Go 2 War" (featuring Mystikal and Full Blooded)	Craig B.	3:18
8.	"Life" (featuring Master P)	Carlos Stephens	3:50
9.	"Uh Oh" (featuring Fiend and Mystikal)	KLC	2:39
10.	"I Miss 'Em" (featuring Mac and O'Dell)	O'Dell	4:14
11.	"Buck 'Em" (featuring Fiend and Magic)	Mo B. Dick	4:12
12.	"Just Me & U"	MP	4:16
13.	"We Represent" (featuring Mia X, C-Murder, Mr. Serv-On and Silkk the Shocker)	Carlos Stephens	4:31
14.	"Assassin" (featuring Master P)	KLC	2:24
15.	"Shake'm Up" (featuring Mac, C-Murder and Gambino Family)	Carlos Stephens	3:01
16.	"Come Home w/ Me" (featuring Mr. Serv-On and Mo B. Dick)	MP	3:44
17.	"Come Get Me" (featuring Mia X)	Mo B. Dick	2:56
18.	"Scriptures"	Craig B.	2:30
Total length:			1:05:43

== Charts ==
Chart (1998)	Peak position
US Billboard 200	16
US Top R&B Albums (Billboard)	3
