= I Got the Hook-Up (soundtrack) =

Soundtrack album by various artists
- Released: April 7, 1998
- Recorded: 1997–1998
- Genres: Hip hop, gangsta rap, R&B
- Length: 78:42
- Labels: No Limit; Priority
- Producers: Master P (exec.); Binky Mack; Bud'da; Carlos Stephens; Chris Lidjio; Craig B.; DJ Daryl; KLC; Mo B. Dick; Mo-Suave-A; N.O. Joe; O'Dell; Pimp C; RZA; Rob Fusari; Sons of Funk; Soopafly; T-Smoov; Vincent Herbert

No Limit Records chronology
I'm Bout It (1997)	I Got the Hook-Up (1998)	Mean Green: Major Players Compilation (1998)

Singles from I Got the Hook-Up
- 1. "I Got the Hook Up" Released: February 3, 1998; 2. "Keep It Real" Released: April 13, 1998

Professional ratings
Review scores
Source	Rating
AllMusic	3/5 stars
Robert Christgau	(choice cut)
Rolling Stone	2.5/5 stars

I Got the Hook-Up is the soundtrack to Michael Martin's 1998 crime comedy film I Got the Hook-Up. It was released on April 7, 1998, through No Limit/Priority Records.

Production was handled by No Limit Records' in-house production team Beats By The Pound, as well as Binky Mack, Bud'da, Chris Lidjio, DJ Daryl, Mo-Suave-A, N.O. Joe, Pimp C, Rob Fusari, RZA, Soopafly, T-Smoov and Vincent Herbert.

It features contributions from film stars Master P, who also served as the soundtrack's executive producer, Mystikal, Ice Cube, Snoop Doggy Dogg, Mia X, Fiend, C-Murder, Mr. Serv-On, and Silkk the Shocker, fellow No Limit labelmates Big Ed, Full Blooded, Ghetto Commission, Gotti, Kane & Abel, Mac, Magic, Mo B. Dick, O'Dell, Prime Suspects, Skull Duggery, Sons of Funk, Soulja Slim and Steady Mobb'n, as well as Jay-Z, Memphis Bleek, Bone Thugs-n-Harmony, Montell Jordan, 8Ball & MJG, Allfrumtha I, Mack 10, Mary Brown, Mechalie Jamison, N.O. Joe, Ol' Dirty Bastard, Road Dawgs, Sauce Money, The Comrads and UGK.

The album peaked at number 3 on the Billboard 200 and topped the Top R&B/Hip-Hop Albums in the United States. It was certified platinum by the Recording Industry Association of America on June 15, 1998. The soundtrack featured the hit single "I Got the Hook-Up!", which made it to No. 16 on the Billboard Hot 100 and No. 11 on the Hot R&B/Hip-Hop Singles & Tracks.

== Track listing ==
No.	Title	Writer(s)	Producer(s)	Length
1.	"Hook It Up" (performed by Master P, Silkk the Shocker & Bone Thugs-n-Harmony)	Percy Miller; Vyshonn Miller; Bone Thugs-n-Harmony	KLC; Craig B	2:53
2.	"Ghetto Vet" (performed by Ice Cube)	O'Shea Jackson; Stephen Anderson	Bud'da	4:36
3.	"What the Game Made Me" (performed by Jay-Z, Sauce Money & Memphis Bleek)	Shawn Carter; Todd Gaither; Malik Cox	Chris Lidjio	4:10
4.	"From What I Was Told" (performed by Soulja Slim)	James Adarryl Tapp Jr.	Carlos Stephens	3:27
5.	"Let's Ride" (performed by Eightball & MJG)	Premro Smith; Marlon Jermaine Goodwin; Triston Jones	Mo-Suave-A Productions	3:41
6.	"I Got the Hook-Up!" (performed by Master P & Sons of Funk)	P. Miller; Desmond Mapp; Rico Crowder; Gregory Mapp; Lorenzo Chew	KLC; Sons of Funk	4:16
7.	"Hooked" (performed by Snoop Doggy Dogg)	Calvin Broadus	Soopafly	4:05
8.	"Down With You" (performed by Montell Jordan & Mary Brown)	Montell Jordan; Mary Brown; Vincent Herbert; Rob Fusari	Vincent Herbert; Rob Fusari	3:48
9.	"Shake Somethin'" (performed by Mystikal, Mia X & KLC)	Michael Tyler; Mia Young	Craig B	2:52
10.	"I Don't Want to Go" (performed by Mo B. Dick, O'Dell & Sons of Funk)	Raymond Emile Poole; Odell Vickers Jr.	O'Dell	5:11
11.	"Would You Hesitate" (performed by C-Murder)	Corey Miller	Craig B	4:16
12.	"Itch or Scratch" (performed by Fiend, Mac, Master P & Prime Suspects)	Richard Jones	O'Dell; KLC	3:31
13.	"Keep It Real" (performed by Mechalie Jamison)	Mechalie Jamison	T-Smoov	4:35
14.	"Who Rock This" (performed by Ol' Dirty Bastard & Mystikal)	Russel Jones; Tyler	RZA; Craig B	3:47
15.	"Bump and Grill" (performed by UGK & N.O. Joe)	Chad Butler; Bernard Freeman	Pimp C; N.O. Joe	4:40
16.	"Tell Me What You're Lookin' For" (performed by Kane & Abel, Gotti & Full Blooded)	Daniel Garcia; David Garcia; Jonathan Miller; Gary Williams	Mo B. Dick	2:43
17.	"Call It What You Want" (performed by Steady Mobb'n)	Aaron Edmand; Billy Moore	DJ Daryl	2:55
18.	"What You Need" (performed by Ghetto Commission)	Dwayne Lawrence; Gary Arnold; Walter Valerio; Byron Dolliolie	Carlos Stephens	2:57
19.	"Drama" (performed by Skull Duggery)	Andrew Jordan	Carlos Stephens	2:24
20.	"We Got It" (performed by Mr. Serv-On, Big Ed, Magic & Fiend)	Corey Smith; Edward Lee Knight; Awood Johnson Jr.; Richard Jones	KLC	2:52
21.	"Bang or Ball" (performed by Mack 10, Allfrumtha I, The Comrads and Road Dawgs)	Dedrick Rolison; Ryan Garner; Marcus Moore; Christopher Norwood; Jonte Ray; Omar Williams; Kelly Garmon; Terrell Anderson	Binky Mack	5:03
Total length:				1:18:42

Sample credits

- Track 3 contains a sample of "Holding You, Loving You" written by Don Tiggs as recorded by Don Blackman

== Charts ==
=== Weekly charts ===
Chart (1998)	Peak position
US Billboard 200	3
US Top R&B/Hip-Hop Albums (Billboard)	1

=== Year-end charts ===
Chart (1998)	Position
US Billboard 200	93
US Top R&B/Hip-Hop Albums (Billboard)	34

== Certifications ==
Region	Certification	Certified units/sales
United States (RIAA)	Platinum	1,000,000^{^}
^{^} Shipments figures based on certification alone.

== See also ==
- List of number-one R&B albums of 1998 (U.S.)
