= The Ultimate Master P =

Compilation album by Master P
- Released: September 5, 2006
- Recorded: 2004–2006
- Genre: Southern hip hop
- Label: Koch
- Producer: Master P, Lil Jon, Myke Diesel, Djuan Bahan

Master P chronology
The Best of Master P (2005)	The Ultimate Master P (2006)	Featuring...Master P (2007)

Professional ratings
Review scores
Source	Rating
AllMusic	link

The Ultimate Master P is the third compilation album released by rapper Master P. It was his first compilation album released through Koch Records and featured songs from Good Side, Bad Side, Ghetto Bill and TRU's The Truth. The track "Act a Fool" peaked at No. 91 on the Billboard Hot R&B/Hip-Hop Singles & Tracks chart.

== Track listing ==
No.	Title	Length
1.	"Tell 'Em"	4:21
2.	"Who Want Some"	3:20
3.	"Them Jeans"	3:43
4.	"Who Them Boyz" (featuring C-Murder, Lil Jon)	3:50
5.	"We Like Them Girlz" (featuring Silkk the Shocker)	2:09
6.	"Let Me See It"	4:17
7.	"Thug Chick"	3:15
8.	"Represent" (featuring Silkk the Shocker)	5:09
9.	"Stressin'" (featuring C-Murder)	3:20
10.	"Shake What Ya Got"	3:51
11.	"There They Go" (featuring Drumma Boy)	3:16
12.	"Act a Fool" (featuring Lil Jon)	3:50
13.	"Dope Mann"	3:34
14.	"I Ain't Play'n"	3:06
15.	"Get the Party Crackin" (featuring Silkk the Shocker)	4:38
16.	"I Need Dubs" (featuring Romeo)	4:01
