= The Best of C-Murder =

Greatest hits album by C-Murder
- Released: October 4, 2005
- Recorded: 1998−2001
- Genre: Gangsta rap, Southern hip hop
- Label: Priority Records
- Producer: Beats By the Pound, Charlie Braxton, Frank Collura

C-Murder chronology
| The Truest Shit I Ever Said (2005) | The Best of C-Murder (2005) | The Tru Story: Continued (2006) |

Professional ratings
Review scores
| Source | Rating |
|---|---|
| AllMusic | link |

The Best of C-Murder is a compilation album released by Priority Records containing the greatest hits of rapper C-Murder. On the same day, Priority also released compilations containing the greatest hits of his brothers Silkk the Shocker and Master P, entitled The Best of Silkk the Shocker and The Best of Master P, and of their group TRU, entitled The Best of TRU.

== Track listing ==
1. "Soldiers" (featuring Master P & Silkk the Shocker) — 5:37
2. "Duck & Run" — 2:51
3. "Makin' Moves" (featuring Master P) — 2:45
4. "On My Enemies" — 3:10
5. "Akickdoe!" (featuring Master P & UGK) — 4:37
6. "Constantly N Danger" (featuring Mia X) — 3:14
7. "Down 4 My Niggaz" (featuring Snoop Dogg & Magic) — 3:46
8. "Gangsta Walk" (featuring Snoop Dogg) — 3:15
9. "Still Makin' Moves" (featuring Master P) — 2:40
10. "NL Soulja" — 2:45
11. "Young Ghetto Boy" — 2:48
12. "Picture Me" (featuring Magic) — 3:56
13. "Concrete Jungle" (featuring Snoop Dogg & Kokane) — 4:35
14. "Hustlin'" — 3:42
15. "Ghetto Ties" (featuring Soulja Slim) — 4:22
16. "They Don't Really Know You" — 3:39
17. "How a Thug Like It" (featuring Da Brat) — 3:14
18. "Let Me See" — 4:09
19. "Lil' Nigga" (featuring Master P) — 3:16
20. "Freedom" — 4:31
