= War Is Me, Pt. 1: Battle Decisions =

War Is Me: Battle Decisions

Studio album by Mr. Serv-On
- Released: June 20, 2000
- Recorded: 1999–2000
- Genre: Hip-hop, gangsta rap
- Label: Lifetime Entertainment
- Producer: Craig B, Court Dog, G-Money, Ozone

Mr. Serv-On chronology
Da Next Level (1999)	War Is Me: Battle Decisions (2000)	Take a Sip (2001)

War Is Me, Pt. 1: Battle Decisions is the third album released by rapper Mr. Serv-On. It was released on June 20, 2000, through independent label, Lifetown Entertainment and featured production by former Beats By the Pound member, Craig B. Coming off the success of his previous album, Da Next Level, Mr. Serv-On left No Limit Records and went independent. Without the promotion of his previous albums, this album only peaked at #75 on the Top R&B/Hip-Hop Albums.

== Track listing ==
1. "Intro"- 1:26
2. "Whatcha Want Ha"- 3:41 (Featuring KLC)
3. "War Is Me"- 3:35
4. "Say Boo"- 2:30
5. "Head-N-Shoulders 2000"- 3:28
6. "Last Dayz"- 4:41
7. "Life-N-Loss"- 4:25
8. "Slab-N-Slim"- :41
9. "Believe Me"- 3:22 (Featuring Blakewater)
10. "Get Up off Me"- 2:31
11. "My City"- 3:12
12. "Woo-Nah"- 3:32
13. "What They Do"- 2:33 (Featuring Three 6 Mafia, Fiend)
14. "Therapy"- 4:01
15. "Thug's Diary"- 5:04
16. "Calm Down Na"- 3:32
17. "Gott 'Em Gott Em"- 3:06 (Featuring Big Ed)
18. "Ghetto Ms."- 3:15
19. "Born 2 Die"- 3:46
20. "This Here, That There"- 2:52
21. "Help, Help"- 2:55
22. "Tequila Dreams"- 2:50
