= There's One in Every Family =

Studio album by Fiend
- Released: May 5, 1998
- Recorded: 1997−1998
- Genres: Southern rap, gangsta rap
- Length: 74:56
- Label: No Limit/Priority
- Producers: Master P Beats By the Pound

Fiend chronology
I Won't Be Denied (1995)	There's One in Every Family (1998)	Street Life (1999)

There's One in Every Family is the second studio album by the American rapper Fiend, released in 1998 on No Limit Records. It was produced by Master P and Beats By the Pound. Like most of the albums released by No Limit in the late 1990s, the album was a success, peaking at number eight on the Billboard 200 and peaked atop the Top R&B/Hip-Hop Albums chart. It featured all of the label's top acts, including Master P, Snoop Dogg, Mystikal, Silkk the Shocker, Mia X and C-Murder.

== Critical reception ==
Professional ratings
Review scores
Source	Rating
AllMusic	4/5 stars
Rolling Stone	3.5/5 stars

A writer for AllMusic said: "[W]ith a frenetically fast-paced feel, coupled with energetic, hard-thumping beats and simplistic but engaging hooks, the album is an hour and fifteen minutes of pure adrenaline rush."

== Commercial performance ==
The album was certified Gold by the RIAA in just over a month after release. The single, "Take My Pain", featuring Master P, Silkk The Shocker, and Sons of Funk, peaked at number 11 on the Top Hip-Hop Singles & Tracks.

== Track listing ==
No.	Title	Producer	Length
1.	"Take My Pain" (featuring Master P, Silkk the Shocker & Sons of Funk)	KLC & Mo B. Dick	4:43
2.	"Going Out With A Blast"	Carlos Stephens	2:48
3.	"Do You Know" (featuring Master P & Mystikal)	KLC	2:55
4.	"Big Timer" (featuring Mia X)	KLC	3:03
5.	"Who Got The Fire" (featuring Master P & Snoop Dogg)	Craig B	4:56
6.	"All I Know"	Mo B. Dick	3:53
7.	"I Swore"	Carlos Stephens	2:14
8.	"Only A Few" (featuring Master P, Big Ed & Silkk the Shocker)	O'Dell	3:56
9.	"The Baddest"	Craig B	3:10
10.	"The Streets Ain't Safe"	Craig B	5:13
11.	"All In A Week" (featuring O'Dell)	O'Dell	3:35
12.	"I.C.U."		0:40
13.	"On A Mission" (featuring C-Murder & Steady Mobb'n)	Mo B. Dick	3:58
14.	"Slangin'" (featuring Master P & UGK)	Beats By the Pound	4:43
15.	"At All Times"	Mo B. Dick	3:50
16.	"Walk Like A G" (featuring Soulja Slim)	KLC	3:44
17.	"We Survivors" (featuring Full Blooded)	KLC	2:19
18.	"What Cha Mean" (featuring Mac, Kane & Abel & Soulja Slim)	KLC	4:24
19.	"Do You Wanna Be A Rider" (featuring Gotti, Magic & Prime Suspects)	KLC	4:04
20.	"For The N.O."	KLC	2:36
21.	"Live Me Long"	KLC & Mo B. Dick	4:12
Total length:			74:56

== Charts ==
=== Weekly charts ===
Chart (1998)	Peak position
US Billboard 200	8
US Top R&B/Hip-Hop Albums (Billboard)	1

=== Year-end charts ===
Chart (1998)	Position
US Billboard 200	167
US Top R&B/Hip-Hop Albums (Billboard)	47

== Certifications ==
Region	Certification	Certified units/sales
United States (RIAA)	Gold	500,000^{^}
^{^} Shipments figures based on certification alone.

== See also ==
- List of number-one R&B albums of 1998 (U.S.)
