= The Best of Master P =

Compilation album by Master P
- Released: October 4, 2005
- Recorded: 1995–2000
- Genre: Hip hop
- Label: Priority Records
- Producer: Master P, Beats By the Pound, Larry D. Henderson-Bounce Dat Azz

Master P chronology
Remix Classics (2005)	The Best of Master P (2005)	The Ultimate Master P (2006)

Professional ratings
Review scores
Source	Rating
Allmusic	4/5 stars
RapReviews	8/10

The Best of Master P is a compilation album released by Priority Records containing the greatest hits of rapper Master P. It was released on October 4, 2005, and peaked at #61 on the Top R&B/Hip-Hop Albums. On the same day, several related compilations were released, The Best of C-Murder, The Best of Silkk the Shocker and The Best of TRU.

== Track listing ==
No.	Title	Original Album	Length
1.	"Bout It, Bout It-" (featuring Mia X)	1996 – Ice Cream Man	5:09
2.	"Make 'Em Say Uhh!" (featuring Fiend, Silkk the Shocker, Mia X)	1997 – Ghetto D	5:06
3.	"How Ya Do Dat" (featuring Young Bleed & CLoc)	1998 - My Balls & My Word	4:30
4.	"Bounce Dat Azz"	1995 - Master P Presents: Down South Hustlers: Bouncin' & Swingin'	5:28
5.	"Thug Girl" (featuring Silkk the Shocker)	1998 – MP Da Last Don	3:13
6.	"I Got the Hook Up!" (featuring Sons of Funk)	1998 - I Got The Hook-Up Soundtrack	4:16
7.	"Hot Boys and Girls" (featuring Silkk the Shocker, Mystikal)	1998 – MP Da Last Don	5:23
8.	"Souljas"	2000 – Ghetto Postage	3:32
9.	"Mr. Ice Cream Man" (featuring Silkk the Shocker)	1996 – Ice Cream Man	5:07
10.	"My Ghetto Heroes" (featuring Skull Duggery)	1996 – Ice Cream Man	4:43
11.	"Bout Dat" (featuring Silkk the Shocker)	2000 – Ghetto Postage	3:21
12.	"Step to Dis"	1999 – Only God Can Judge Me	2:50
13.	"Break 'Em Off Somethin'"	1996 – Ice Cream Man	4:42
14.	"Bourbons and Lacs" (featuring Silkk the Shocker)	1997 – Ghetto D	4:09
15.	"Goodbye to My Homies" (featuring Silkk the Shocker, Sons of Funk)	1998 – Da Last Don	4:12
16.	"I Miss My Homies" (featuring Pimp C, Silkk the Shocker)	1997 – Ghetto D	5:25
17.	"Is There a Heaven 4 a Gangsta"	1997 - Rhyme & Reason Soundtrack	3:13
18.	"If I Could Change" (featuring Steady Mobb'n)	1997 - I'm Bout It Soundtrack	4:12
