= Pre-Meditated Drama =

Studio album by Steady Mobb'n
- Released: May 6, 1997
- Recorded: 1996−1997
- Studio: No Limit Studios; The Grill (Oakland, CA)
- Genre: Gangsta rap
- Length: 1:06:14
- Label: No Limit; Priority
- Producer: Craig B.; DJ Daryl; KLC

Steady Mobb'n chronology
Pre-Meditated Drama (1997)	Black Mafia (1998)

Pre-Meditated Drama is the debut studio album by American hip-hop duo Steady Mobb'n. It was released May 6, 1997 via No Limit/Priority Records. Recording sessions took place at No Limit Studios and at The Grill in Oakland. Production was handled by DJ Daryl, Craig B and KLC, with Master P serving as executive producer. It features guest appearances from Master P, Fiend, Marvin Klark, Big Ed, C-Loc, C-Murder, Dirty White, JT the Bigga Figga, Kane & Abel, Killa K, Kollision, Mac, Mia X, Mystikal, Richie Rich and Silkk the Shocker, as well as contributions from Ephriam Galloway, Juda, and Maliki on guitar.

In the United States, the album debuted at number 29 on the Billboard 200 and peaked at number 6 on the Top R&B/Hip-Hop Albums charts, with first-week sales of more than 32,800 units.

The original version of "If I Could Change" was heard in the film, I'm Bout It, and was also released as a single and a music video to promote the film's soundtrack.

== Critical reception ==
Professional ratings
Review scores
Source	Rating
AllMusic	4/5 stars
The Source	3.5/5 stars

Miguel Burke of The Source wrote: "Pre-Meditated Drama shows that (Steady Mobb'n) definitely have those engaging narratives of the hustling street life....if you truly appreciate gangsta rap and the sound that has made No Limit records so popular, then this is the album for you".

== Track listing ==
No.	Title	Writer(s)	Producer(s)	Length
1.	"Intro"
2.	"Strong Heart"	Aaron Benjamin Edmond; Billy Bernard Moore	DJ Daryl
3.	"It's On" (featuring Master P, Fiend and Mystikal)	Edmond; Moore; Percy Miller; Richard Jones	KLC
4.	"Animosity"	Edmond; Moore	DJ Daryl
5.	"Trouble" (featuring Richie Rich)	Edmond; Moore	DJ Daryl
6.	"Kidnap Call" (Commercial 1)
7.	"West to South" (featuring Master P, Kane & Abel, Fiend, C-Murder, Silkk the Shocker, Mac and C-Loc)	Edmond; Moore; P. Miller; Daniel Garcia; David Garcia; Jones; Corey Miller; Vyshonn Miller; McKinley Phipps	DJ Daryl
8.	"Puff Puff Pass"	Edmond; Moore	DJ Daryl
9.	"Dice Game" (Commercial 2)
10.	"Check Ya Nuts"	Edmond; Moore	DJ Daryl
11.	"Trying to Get Mine" (featuring Master P and JT the Bigga Figga)	Edmond; Moore; P. Miller; Joseph Thompson	DJ Daryl
12.	"Call Back" (Commercial 3)
13.	"Blood Money" (featuring Marvin Klark)	Edmond; Moore; Marvin Clark	DJ Daryl
14.	"Lil N"	Edmond; Moore	DJ Daryl
15.	"Up to No Good" (featuring Mia X, Big Ed and Master P)	Edmond; Moore; Mia Young; Edward Lee Knight; P. Miller	Craig B.
16.	"Block Monsters" (featuring Killa K, Marvin Klark and Kollision)	Edmond; Moore; Killa K; Clark; Damien Bell; Leshon Edwards; Tyme Brown	DJ Daryl
17.	"Mr. Serv-On" (Commercial 4)
18.	"4 Corners" (featuring Dirty White)	Edmond; Moore; Dirty White	DJ Daryl
19.	"If I Could Change (Remix)" (featuring Ephriam Galloway and Juda)	Edmond; Moore	DJ Daryl

== Charts ==
Chart (1997)	Peak position
US Billboard 200	29
US Top R&B/Hip-Hop Albums (Billboard)	6
