= Special Forces (Big Ed album) =

Studio album by Big Ed
- Released: May 9, 2000
- Recorded: 1999–2000
- Genre: Hip-hop
- Length: 1:13:01
- Label: Special Forces Records
- Producer: Les G; Ozone; The Medicine Men; Warlock

Big Ed chronology
The Assassin (1998)	Special Forces (2000)	Edward Lee Knight 1971–2001 (2001)

Professional ratings
Review scores
Source	Rating
AllMusic	4/5 stars

Special Forces is the second solo studio album by American rapper Big Ed. It was released on May 9, 2000 through his own independent record label, Special Forces Records. Production was handled by Les-G, The Medicine Men, Warlock and Ozone. It features guest appearances from C-Murder, Fiend, Kane & Abel, Mo B. Dick, Mr. Serv-On, Skull Duggery and Stealth Assassins. On October 31, 2000, a chopped and screwed version was released via Swishahouse. An accompanying music video was directed for the song "Battlefield".

== Track listing ==
No.	Title	Producer(s)	Length
1.	"Intro"		0:22
2.	"I Am the Hardest"	The Medicine Men	2:39
3.	"U Know Where to Find Me"	The Medicine Men	3:15
4.	"Battlefield"	Les G	2:29
5.	"My MF's"	Les G	3:03
6.	"Get It On" (featuring Fiend)	Les G	3:18
7.	"Skit"		2:22
8.	"F'ckfest" (featuring Mo B. Dick)	Warlock	4:41
9.	"Watching U"	Warlock	3:17
10.	"Forgetaboutit"	The Medicine Men	3:01
11.	"Head Busta"	Warlock	3:20
12.	"No N'gga"	Les G	3:38
13.	"Get'Em"	Les G	2:48
14.	"Don't Play With Me" (featuring C-Murder, Kane & Abel)	Les G	2:44
15.	"Me & U"	Warlock; Ozone	3:22
16.	"Study Ya Lessons"	The Medicine Men	3:24
17.	"Who Am I"	Les G	3:11
18.	"Work It Out" (featuring Mr. Serv-On)	Les G	3:21
19.	"I Got Yo Back" (featuring Skull Duggery)	The Medicine Men	4:01
20.	"Thank U"	Warlock	3:08
21.	"Don't Give Up"	The Medicine Men	3:00
22.	"Special Forces Ops" (featuring Stealth Assassins)	Les G	4:56
23.	"Armageddon"	The Medicine Men	3:41
Total length:			1:13:01
