= Black Mafia (album) =

Studio album by Steady Mobb'n
- Released: November 24, 1998
- Recorded: 1998
- Genre: Hip-hop
- Length: 1:08:19
- Label: No Limit; Priority
- Producer: Carlos Stephens; Craig B.; KLC; Meech Wells; Mo B. Dick; M.P.; O'Dell

Steady Mobb'n chronology
Pre-Meditated Drama (1997)	Black Mafia (1998)	Crime Buddies (2001)

Professional ratings
Review scores
Source	Rating
AllMusic	4/5 stars

Black Mafia is the second studio album by American hip-hop duo Steady Mobb'n. It was released on November 24, 1998, through No Limit/Priority Records, marking the duo's second and final full-length for the label.

Produced by Beats by the Pound and Meech Wells, it features guest appearances from Snoop Dogg, C-Murder, Mystikal, Fiend, Freedom, Full Blooded, Lil' Soldiers, Mac, Magic, Master P, Mia X, M.P., Mr. Serv-On, Prime Suspects, Renzo, Silkk the Shocker and Gambino Family. According to group member Billy Bavgate, the record was completed in one week.

The album failed to match the major success of their 1997's Pre-Meditated Drama, debuting at number 82 on the Billboard 200 and number 19 on the Top R&B/Hip-Hop Albums charts with 21,000 copies sold in its first week. It was supported with the only promotional single "Ghetto Life". Most critics blame the albums lackluster sales and weak delivery on the account of DJ Daryl not being present on the album. Steady Mobb'n departed No Limit Records thereafter.

== Track listing ==
No.	Title	Writer(s)	Producer(s)	Length
1.	"Ghetto Life" (featuring Snoop Dogg and Master P)	Aaron Edmand; Billy Moore; Calvin Broadus; Percy Miller; Marvin Gaye	Craig B.	4:37
2.	"'Bout Dat Mess" (featuring Fiend, M.P., Mystikal, Mia X and Mac)	Edmand; Moore	O'Dell	3:13
3.	"Still Hustlin'" (featuring Renzo)	Edmand; Moore	M.P.	3:56
4.	"When Them Killas Call" (featuring C-Murder)	Edmand; Moore	O'Dell	3:45
5.	"Niggas Like Me" (featuring Mystikal and Silkk the Shocker)	Edmand; Moore	KLC	4:28
6.	"Papa Didn't Raise No Punks" (featuring C-Murder)	Edmand; Moore	Craig B.	3:12
7.	"Lil' Niggas" (featuring Lil' Soldiers)	Edmand; Moore	KLC	3:04
8.	"Plead My Case" (featuring Magic)	Edmand; Moore; Awood Johnson Jr.	Craig B.	3:51
9.	"Heaven or Hell"	Edmand; Moore	Mo B. Dick	3:48
10.	"Carry On" (featuring Mr. Serv-On)	Edmand; Moore	Carlos Stephens; O'Dell	4:30
11.	"Light Green and Remmy" (featuring Snoop Dogg)	Edmand; Moore	Meech Wells	4:12
12.	"Stick Up" (featuring Freedom)	Edmand; Moore; Clinton Wright	Mo B. Dick	2:46
13.	"Turn Me Up" (featuring Snoop Dogg)	Edmand; Moore	Carlos Stephens	4:18
14.	"Family Ties" (featuring Gambino Family)	Edmand; Moore; Lawrence Johnson; Reginald Johnson; Melchior Johnson; Edward Bell	Craig B.	4:36
15.	"No One"	Edmand; Moore	Mo B. Dick	3:17
16.	"Crosses Artist" (featuring Full Blooded)	Edmand; Moore; Gary Williams	Craig B.	3:44
17.	"MG Theme"	Edmand; Moore	Mo B. Dick	3:47
18.	"Hit a Lick" (featuring Prime Suspects)	Edmand; Moore	KLC	3:15
Total length:				1:08:19

Sample credits

- Track 1 contains elements from "Mercy Mercy Me (The Ecology)" written by Marvin Gaye.
- Track 3 contains elements from "Sweet Sticky Thing" written by James Williams, Clarence Satchell, Leroy Bonner, Marshall Jones, Ralph Middlebrooks, Marvin Pierce and William Beck.
- Track 13 contains elements from "The Message" written by Edward Fletcher, Sylvia Robinson, Melvin Glover and Clifton Chase.

== Personnel ==
- Aaron "Crooked Eye" Edmand – vocals
- Billy "Bavgate" Moore – vocals
- Calvin "Snoop Dogg" Broadus – featured artist (tracks: 1, 11, 13)
- Percy "Master P" Miller – featured artist (track 1), executive producer
- Richard "Fiend" Jones – featured artist (track 2)
- M.P. – featured artist (track 2), producer (track 3)
- Michael "Mystikal" Tyler – featured artist (tracks: 2, 5)
- Mia "Mia X" Young – featured artist (track 2)
- McKinley "Mac" Phipps Jr. – featured artist (track 2)
- Joshua "Renzo" Chew – featured artist (track 3)
- Corey "C-Murder" Miller – featured artist (tracks: 4, 6)
- Vyshonn "Silkk the Shocker" Miller – featured artist (track 5)
- Ikeim – featured artist (track 7)
- Freequan – featured artist (track 7)
- Awood "Magic" Johnson Jr. – featured artist (track 8)
- Corey "Mr. Serv-On" Smith – featured artist (track 10)
- Clinton "Freedom" Wright – featured artist (track 12)
- Lawrence "Gotti" Johnson – featured artist (track 14)
- Reginald "Reginelli" Johnson – featured artist (track 14)
- Melchior Johnson – featured artist (track 14)
- Edward "P'heno" Bell – featured artist (track 14)
- Gary "Full Blooded" Williams – featured artist (track 16)
- Tayari "Gangsta T" Herrera – featured artist (track 18)
- Damien "New-9" Dixon – featured artist (track 18)
- Ernest "Uzi" Espradron – featured artist (track 18)
- Craig Bazile – additional vocals (track 8), producer (tracks: 1, 6, 8, 14, 16)
- Hawkins – additional vocals (track 8)
- Raymond "Mo B. Dick" Poole – additional vocals (tracks: 9, 17), producer (tracks: 9, 12, 15, 17)
- Aldreamer "Peaches" Smith – additional vocals (tracks: 10, 15)
- O'Dell Vickers Jr. – producer (tracks: 2, 4, 10)
- Craig "KLC" Lawson – producer (tracks: 5, 7, 18)
- Carlos Stephens – producer (tracks: 10, 13)
- Cecil Demetrius "Meech Wells" Womack Jr. – producer (track 11)
- Omni Color – design, layout
- Pen & Pixel – cover artwork
- Duffy Rich – A&R coordinator

== Charts ==
Chart performance for Black Mafia
Chart (1998)	Peak position
US Billboard 200	82
US Top R&B/Hip-Hop Albums (Billboard)	19
