= These Wicked Streets =

Studio album by Skull Duggery
- Released: September 8, 1998
- Recorded: 1997−98
- Genres: Southern hip hop; gangsta rap
- Length: 1:17:54
- Labels: No Limit; Penalty
- Producers: Master P (exec.); Beats By The Pound

Skull Duggery chronology
Hoodlum fo' Life (1996)	These Wicked Streets (1998)	3rd Ward Stepper (2000)

Professional ratings
Review scores
Source	Rating
AllMusic	2.5/5 stars
The Source	3.5/5 stars

These Wicked Streets is the second studio album by American rapper Skull Duggery. It was released on September 8, 1998 via No Limit/Penalty Recordings, making it the rapper's final record for the label. Production was handled by Beats By The Pound, with Master P serving as executive producer. It features guest appearances from Silkk the Shocker, C-Murder, Fiend, Master P, Mo B. Dick, Big Ed, Ghetto Commission, KLC, Mia X, Mr. Serv-On, Mystikal, O'Dell, Shad, Snoop Dogg and Soup Bone. The album peaked at number 21 on the Billboard 200, number 41 on the Heatseekers Albums and number 4 on the Top R&B/Hip-Hop Albums in the United States.

== Track listing ==
No.	Title	Writer(s)	Producer(s)	Length
1.	"Where You From" (featuring Master P and Silkk the Shocker)	Andrew Jordan; Percy Miller; Vyshonn Miller	Craig B.	4:17
2.	"If It Don't Make $$$..." (featuring Master P and Fiend)	Jordan; P. Miller; Richard Jones; Eldra DeBarge; William DeBarge; Etterlene DeBarge	Mo B. Dick	4:09
3.	"The Set Up" (featuring Mia X)	Jordan; Mia Young	Carlos Stephens	4:36
4.	"Testimony" (featuring Fiend and Mr. Serv-On)	Jordan; Jones; Corey Smith	Carlos Stephens	4:31
5.	"Satisfied" (featuring Mystikal)	Jordan; Michael Tyler; Billy Nichols	Craig B.	4:37
6.	"Mistakes in the Game" (featuring Snoop Doggy Dogg)	Jordan; Calvin Broadus	Craig B.	4:39
7.	"My Regiment" (featuring Ghetto Commission)	Jordan; Dwayne Lawrence; Gary Arnold; Walter Valerio; Byron Dolliole	Carlos Stephens	4:24
8.	"Shakin in the Streets" (featuring KLC)	Jordan; Craig Stephen Lawson	KLC; O'Dell	3:59
9.	"I'm Not a Victim" (featuring Big Ed, Soup Bone and Shad)	Jordan; Edward Lee Knight; Soup Bone; Shad	O'Dell	5:03
10.	"It's No Limit"	Jordan	KLC	4:06
11.	"Pain"	Jordan	Carlos Stephens	4:34
12.	"Murder Crime"	Jordan	Craig B.	4:30
13.	"If U Feel" (featuring C-Murder and Silkk the Shocker)	Jordan; Corey Miller; V. Miller	KLC; Mo B. Dick; Carlos Stephens	3:40
14.	"Drama"	Jordan	Carlos Stephens	3:51
15.	"What What"	Jordan	Carlos Stephens	3:28
16.	"These Wicked Streets"	Jordan	O'Dell	4:25
17.	"For the Fans"	Jordan	Carlos Stephens	4:47
18.	"Ghetto Niggas" (featuring C-Murder and Silkk the Shocker)	Jordan; C. Miller; V. Miller	Mo B. Dick	4:18
Total length:				1:17:54

Sample credits

- Track 2 contains a sample of "I Like It" written by Eldra DeBarge, William DeBarge and Etterlene DeBarge
- Track 5 contains a re-play of "Do It ('Til You're Satisfied)" written by Billy Nichols

== Charts ==
Chart (1998)	Peak position
US Billboard 200	21
US Heatseekers Albums (Billboard)	41
US Top R&B/Hip-Hop Albums (Billboard)	4
