= Da Crime Family =

Studio album by TRU
- Released: June 1, 1999
- Recorded: August 1998– May 1999
- Genres: Hip-hop; Southern hip-hop; gangsta rap
- Length: 91:10
- Labels: Priority; No Limit
- Producers: Beats By the Pound; Battlecat; Meech Wells; Keith Clizark; Ke'Noe

TRU chronology
Tru 2 da Game (1997)	Da Crime Family (1999)	The Truth (2005)

Singles from Da Crime Family
- 1. "Hoody Hooo" Released: May 10, 1999; 2. "Tru Homies" Released: August 14, 1999; 3. "Bounce That A**" Released: January 30, 2000

Professional ratings
Review scores
Source	Rating
AllMusic	2.5/5 stars
Los Angeles Times	2/4 stars
USA Today	3/4 stars

Da Crime Family is the fifth studio album by New Orleans hip-hop group, TRU, released June 1, 1999, via Priority Records and Master P's No Limit Records. It was produced by Beats By the Pound, Ke'Noe, Meech Wells, Keith Clizark and Battlecat. Da Crime Family debuted at #5 and peaked on the Billboard 200 and #2 on the Top R&B/Hip-Hop Albums, selling over 139,000 copies in its first week. The album was held from the #1 position on the Top R&B/Hip-Hop Albums by Ja Rule's Venni Vetti Vecci. Da Crime Family contains the lead single "Hoody Hooo" which made it to #11 on the Hot R&B/Hip-Hop Singles & Tracks. The other single "Tru Homies" peaked at #6 on the Hot Rap Singles and #61 on the Hot R&B/Hip-Hop Singles & Tracks. The album was certified Gold by RIAA on July 27, 1999.

== Commercial performance ==
Da Crime Family debuted and peaked at #5 on the Billboard 200 and #2 on the Top R&B/Hip-Hop Albums, selling over 139,000 copies in its first week. It was held from the #1 position on the Top R&B/Hip-Hop Albums by Ja Rule's Venni Vetti Vecci. The album was certified Gold by the RIAA.

== Track listing ==
Da Crime Family

Disc 1
No.	Title	Length
1.	"TRU - The Beginning"	3:55
2.	"Hoody Hooo"	3:25
3.	"Dangerous in My City" (featuring Fiend & Full Blooded)	2:47
4.	"Miller Boyz" (featuring Ghetto Commission)	3:32
5.	"TRU Homies" (featuring O'Dell)	3:34
6.	"Don't Judge Me" (featuring Popeye)	4:06
7.	"The Tank Goes On" (featuring O'Dell & Porsha)	3:58
8.	"Hard N****'s" (featuring Fiend)	3:24
9.	"Stay Real" (featuring Skull Duggery)	3:32
10.	"Suppose to Be My Friend" (featuring Snoop Dogg & Charlie Wilson)	3:00
11.	"The Ghetto is a Struggle (feat. Ms. Peaches)"	3:19
12.	"Run Away Slaves"	4:10
13.	"Livin' Like a Hustler" (featuring Ms. Peaches, O'Dell & Mo B. Dick)	2:49
14.	"No Limit Army" (featuring Mac & Pheno of Gambino Family)	4:22

Disc 2
No.	Title	Length
1.	"Bounce"	2:17
2.	"You'll Never Change" (featuring Mac, D.I.G. & Ms. Peaches)	3:28
3.	"Hail Mary" (featuring Magic)	3:23
4.	"I Don't Want You No More" (featuring Mr. Serv-On & Val Young)	3:40
5.	"Soldier Till I Die" (featuring D.I.G. & Magic)	3:21
6.	"Buss That" (featuring Mia X)	2:08
7.	"Don't Fuck With TRU"	3:14
8.	"Never" (featuring Baby Soulja, Reginelli of Gambino Family & D.I.G.)	2:36
9.	"R.I.P. Kevin" (featuring O'Dell & Porsha)	4:21
10.	"Bounce to This" (featuring Big Ed)	2:58
11.	"It's a Beautiful Thing" (featuring Snoop Dogg)	2:17
12.	"The World Is Yours"	2:35
13.	"We Riders"	2:18
14.	"Prayer for a G" (performed by Silkk The Shocker)	3:03
15.	"TRU Homies (Radio Edit)" (featuring O'Dell)	4:15

== Charts ==
=== Weekly charts ===
Chart (1999)	Peak position
US Billboard 200	5
US Top R&B/Hip-Hop Albums (Billboard)	2

=== Year-end charts ===
Chart (1999)	Position
US Billboard 200	117
US Top R&B/Hip-Hop Albums (Billboard)	43

== Certifications ==
Region	Certification	Certified units/sales
United States (RIAA)	Gold	500,000^{^}
^{^} Shipments figures based on certification alone.
