= Crime Buddies =

2001 album by American rappers Steady Mobb'n

Studio album by Steady Mobb'n
- Released: August 7, 2001
- Recorded: 2001
- Genre: Gangsta rap, West Coast hip hop
- Length: 1:12:38
- Label: Bomb Shelter / Coldcash Records / Power Recordings
- Producer: Steady Mobb'n, Mo B. Dick, DJ Daryl

Steady Mobb'n chronology
Black Mafia (1998)	Crime Buddies (2001)	Espionage (2003)

Professional ratings
Review scores
Source	Rating
Sputnikmusic	2.5/5 stars

Crime Buddies is the third studio album performed by American hip hop duo Steady Mobb'n. It was released on August 7, 2001, through Bomb Shelter / Colcash Records / Power Recordings and was produced by DJ Daryl.

== Track listing ==
No.	Title	Length
1.	"I Am"	5:13
2.	"On Your Job" (featuring Curren$y and Big Ramp 504 Ridahz)	3:23
3.	"Bang to Dis" (featuring Butch Cassidy)	4:04
4.	"Big Fishes" (featuring Messy Marv)	4:25
5.	"Call It What You Want"	3:06
6.	"Let's Get It Crackin" (featuring Nate Dogg)	4:54
7.	"Luv Ones" (featuring Delinquents)	4:30
8.	"Sounds Like a Busta"	3:11
9.	"Flipside"	4:23
10.	"Stop Poppin Shit" (featuring Outlawz)	5:25
11.	"Zoning"	5:00
12.	"A Favor" (featuring Guce)	4:41
13.	"Hott" (featuring Sons of Funk)	4:25
14.	"Show Me Watcha Twerkin"	3:13
15.	"Bang Wit Me" (featuring Black Mafia Family)	4:44
16.	"Fuck Watcha Talkin Bout"	5:13
17.	"Crime Buddies"	2:48

== Personnel ==
=== Performers ===
- Crooked Eye - primary artist
- Billy Bavgate - primary artist
- Black Mafia Family - guest artist on "Bang Wit Me"
- Butch Cassidy - guest artist on "Bang to Dis"
- The Delinquents - guest artist on "Luv Ones"
- Nate Dogg - guest artist on "Let's Get It Crackin"
- E-40 - guest artist
- Guce - guest artist on "A Favor"
- Messy Marv - guest artist on "Big Fishes"
- Outlawz - guest artist on "Stop Poppin Shit"
- Sho Dawg - guest artist on "Zoning"
- Sons of Funk - guest artist on "Hott"
- Curren$y - guest artist on "On Your Job"
- Big Ramp 504 Ridahz - guest artist on "On Your Job"

=== Development team ===
- DJ Daryl Anderson - executive producer
- LeRoy McMath - executive producer
- Aaron Thompson - executive producer
- Craig B. - producer
- Berry Evans - photography
- Steve Knight - producer
- B.B. Moore - composer
