= The Game of Funk =

Studio album by Sons of Funk
- Released: April 21, 1998
- Recorded: 1997–1998
- Genre: R&B; hip hop
- Length: 52:22
- Label: No Limit; Priority
- Producer: Beats by the Pound; Sons of Funk

Singles from The Game of Funk
- 1. "Pushin' Inside You" Released: 1997; 2. "I Got the Hook Up!" Released: February 3, 1998

Professional ratings
Review scores
Source	Rating
AllMusic	3/5 stars
Rolling Stone	2.5/5 stars

The Game of Funk is the only studio album by American R&B/hip hop quartet Sons of Funk. It was released on April 21, 1998, via No Limit/Priority Records. Production was handled by Sons of Funk themselves, as well as KLC and Mo B. Dick, with Master P serving as executive producer. It features guest appearances from Master P, Silkk the Shocker and Mo B. Dick. The album peaked at number 44 on the Billboard 200 and number 14 on the Top R&B/Hip-Hop Albums chart in the United States. Its lead single "Pushin' Inside You" made it to number 97 on the Billboard Hot 100, and its second single "I Got the Hook Up!", which was previously included in 1998 crime comedy film I Got the Hook-Up soundtrack, reached number 16 on the Billboard Hot 100.

Reviewing the album for AllMusic, Leo Stanley wrote: «the Sons of Funk's debut album, Game of Funk, is an uneven, but enjoyable collection of hardcore gangsta rap, highlighted by the seamless, funky production. The rhymes and beats aren't particularly original, but a few cuts are very well done, illustrating that the group has promise and may be able to deliver a record as strong as singles like "Pushin' Inside You"».

== Track listing ==
No.	Title	Producer(s)	Length
1.	"Make Love to a Thug" (featuring Master P)	Sons of Funk	4:18
2.	"Sons Reasons"	M.P.	3:17
3.	"You and Me"	Sons of Funk	3:51
4.	"I Got the Hook Up!" (featuring Master P)	Sons of Funk; KLC	4:17
5.	"Y'all I Want"	Sons of Funk	4:06
6.	"The First Time"	Sons of Funk	4:39
7.	"Side to Side" (featuring Master P, Silkk the Shocker and Mo B. Dick)	Mo B. Dick	4:00
8.	"Makin' Luv to My Bitch"	Sons of Funk	3:33
9.	"Pushin' Inside You"	Sons of Funk	3:49
10.	"Sons...I Got The Hook-Up! (R&B)"	Sons of Funk	4:07
11.	"Don't Wanna Let You Go"	Sons of Funk	4:20
12.	"Hey Lady"	Sons of Funk	3:55
13.	"Time Will Tell" (featuring Master P)	Sons of Funk	4:09
Total length:			52:22

== Personnel ==
- Rico Crowder – vocals, producer (tracks: 1, 3-6, 8-13)
- Lorenzo "Renzo" Chew – vocals, producer (tracks: 1, 3–6, 8–13)
- Desmond "Des" Mapp – vocals, producer (tracks: 1, 3–6, 8–13)
- Gregory "G-Smooth" Mapp – vocals, producer (tracks: 1, 3–6, 8–13)
- Percy "Master P" Miller – vocals (tracks: 1, 4, 13), voice (track 7), executive producer
- Vyshonn "Silkk the Shocker" Miller – vocals (track 7)
- Raymond Emile "Mo B. Dick" Poole – additional vocals & producer (track 7)
- Craig Stephen "KLC" Lawson – producer (track 4)
- Pen & Pixel Graphics – artwork, design
- Omni Color – design, layout
- Duffy Rich – A&R
- Anthony Boswell – management
- Barbara Pescosolido – management
- Tevester Scott – booking

== Charts ==
Chart (1998)	Peak position
US Billboard 200	44
US Top R&B Albums (Billboard)	14
