= Da Next Level =

Studio album by Mr. Serv-On
- Released: February 16, 1999
- Recorded: 1998
- Genre: Southern hip hop; gangsta rap
- Length: 74:59
- Label: No Limit; Priority
- Producer: Beats By the Pound (exec.)

Mr. Serv-On chronology
| Life Insurance (1997) | Da Next Level (1999) | War Is Me, Pt. 1: Battle Decisions (2000) |

Singles from Da Next Level
- 1. "N.Y to N.O (feat. Big Pun)" Released: January 2, 1999

Professional ratings
Review scores
| Source | Rating |
|---|---|
| AllMusic | 4/5 stars |

Da Next Level is the second album by the American rapper Mr. Serv-On. It was released on February 16, 1999, as planned, through No Limit Records and Priority Records. It was produced entirely by the label's in-house production team, Beats By the Pound. It was the rapper's last album on No Limit Records.

== Commercial performance ==
The album was more critically and commercially successful than the first album, debuting at number 14 on the Billboard 200 and number 1 on the Top R&B/Hip-Hop Albums. It sold nearly 300,000 copies in its first week. The album's single was "From N.Y to N.O.", featuring Big Pun.

== Critical reception ==
The San Diego Union-Tribune wrote that "a few introspective cuts, namely 'I Hate the Way I Live', 'My Homies' and 'Best Friend II', showcase his knack for writing touching, heartfelt ballads."

== Track listing ==
1. "Forever My Life: The Beginning" 1:35
2. "Tank Nigga" (Featuring C-Murder, Fiend, Kane & Abel, Lil Soldiers, Mia X, Big Ed & Mac) 4:48
3. "Boot 'Em Up" (Featuring Fiend & Mystikal) 3:09
4. "From N.Y. To N.O." (Featuring Big Pun) 2:51
5. "F.U. Serv" 3:14
6. "Murder" (Featuring Magic)" 4:27
7. "I Hate the Way I Live" 5:22
8. "Best Friend II" (Featuring C-Murder & Dorian) 4:00
9. 1, 2, 3"- (Featuring Holloway of Ghetto Commission) 2:45
10. "Straight Outta N.O." (Featuring C-Murder & Magic) 3:48
11. "Snatch Them Hoez Up" (Featuring Mia X, Fiend & T. Scott) 2:51
12. "My Homies" (Featuring Sons of Funk) 4:25
13. "This Is for My Niggaz" (Featuring Ghetto Commission) 4:23
14. "Freaky Dreams" (Featuring O'Dell) 4:04
15. "Make 'Em Bleed" (Featuring Fiend) 2:15
16. "Hit the Block" 2:34
17. "Strap Up" (Featuring Fiend) 2:51
18. "I'll Be There" (Featuring Ms. Peaches) 3:38
19. "My Story" (Featuring KLC) 4:20
20. "I Luv It" 2:04
21. "The Last Song" (Featuring O'Dell) 4:05
22. "Forever My Life: The End" 1:26

== Album chart positions ==
| Year | Album | Chart positions | |
| Year | Album | U.S. Billboard 200 | U.S. Top R&B/Hip Hop Albums |
| 1999 | Da Next Level | #14 | #1 |

== See also ==
- List of number-one R&B albums of 1999 (U.S.)
