= Go Hard or Go Home =

"Go hard or go home" is an idiom meaning "if one does not put forth effort, then one might as well stop trying." It may also refer to:

- "Go Hard or Go Home" (album), a 2004 album by Fiend
- "Go Hard or Go Home" (song), a 2015 song by Wiz Khalifa and Iggy Azalea for the Furious 7 soundtrack
- "Go Hard or Go Home", a song by Kylie Minogue from Aphrodite
- "Go Hard or Go Home", a 2006 song by E-40 (featuring Stressmatic of the Federation) from My Ghetto Report Card
