= Big Body =

Big body may refer to:

- Kinnikuman Big Body
- Toyota Corolla (E100), local nickname in the Philippines
- Big Body (P-Model album)
- Big Body Entertainment Espionage (album)
