= Edward Lee Knight 1971–2001 =

Studio album by Big Ed the Assassin
- Released: August 21, 2001
- Recorded: 2000–2001
- Genre: West Coast hip-hop, gangsta rap
- Label: Special Forces Records
- Producer: G-Money, Kane & Abel, Warlock

Big Ed the Assassin chronology
| Special Forces (2000) | Edward Lee Knight 1971–2001 (2001) |

Edward Lee Knight 1971–2001 is the third and final album by rapper Big Ed the Assassin, released posthumously on August 21, 2001, by Special Forces Records.

== Track listing ==
Edward Lee Knight 1971–2001
| No. | Title | Length |
|---|---|---|
| 1. | "Faith" | 2:28 |
| 2. | "Assassin" | 4:04 |
| 3. | "Dirty Dirty" (featuring Block Burners) | 3:40 |
| 4. | "Take No Shit" (featuring Fiend) | 3:24 |
| 5. | "Take It Off" (featuring Gripp From The Block Burners) | 3:40 |
| 6. | "Daily Drama" (featuring Mr. Serv-On) | 2:59 |
| 7. | "Trials and Tribulations" | 3:02 |
| 8. | "Where U From Da' Hood Anthem" | 3:12 |
| 9. | "Voices" (featuring Kane & Abel) | 3:52 |
| 10. | "Wanna Hit" | 3:27 |
| 11. | "Woo Games" (featuring C-Murder) | 2:51 |
| 12. | "Here We Come" (featuring Block Burners) | 3:47 |
| 13. | "Block Burnerz" | 3:39 |
| 14. | "Dog Bitches" | 3:35 |
| 15. | "Woosh" (featuring S.A.W.) | 4:24 |
| 16. | "Faith" | 2:29 |
