= Espionage (disambiguation) =

Espionage is the obtaining of information considered secret or confidential without the permission of the holder of the information.

- Industrial espionage is a form of espionage conducted for commercial purposes instead of purely national security.

Espionage may also refer to:

== Media ==
=== Film and television ===
- Espionage (1937 film), an American film based on the play
- Espionage (1955 film), an Austrian film directed by Franz Antel
- Espionage (TV series), a British television show 1963–64
- "Espionage" (QI), a 2007 television episode

=== Music ===
- Espionage (production team), a Norwegian music production team

==== Albums and songs ====
- Espionage (album), an album by rap group Steady Mobb'n
- Espionage (band), a band from the 1980s
- "Espionage", a song by Green Day from Shenanigans

=== Plays ===
- Espionage (play), a 1935 West End play by Walter Hackett

=== Games ===
- Espionage!, a 1983 spy role-playing game
- Espionage, a Commodore 64 game
