= Gangsta 1 More Time =

Studio album by Mr. Serv-On
- Released: November 17, 2009
- Recorded: 2009, New Orleans
- Genre: Southern hip hop, gangsta rap
- Label: Dirty Thug
- Producer: Yung Mil

Mr. Serv-On chronology
Life Insurance 2 (Heart Muzik) (2008)	Gangsta 1 More Time (2009)	Internet Platinum (2011)

Gangsta 1 More Time is the seventh studio album and first mixtape by Mr. Serv-On, released in 2009.

== Track listing ==
No.	Title	Length
1.	"All My Life"	3:39
2.	"Bottles Up"	2:34
3.	"Do It For Real"	3:45
4.	"Soldier Up (feat. Impurity)"	4:24
5.	"Back Up Off Me"	3:35
6.	"Get Em (feat. Killa C)"	4:55
7.	"M.f. Life"	3:06
8.	"Satisfied"	3:55
9.	"Money Over Everything"	3:03
10.	"Out There"	3:34
11.	"Parking Lot"	2:13
12.	"Hands Up"	3:27
13.	"Block Time (feat. Young Cutty)"	3:31
