= Hoodlum fo' Life =

Studio album by Skull Dugrey
- Released: October 1, 1996
- Recorded: 1995–1996
- Genre: Gangsta rap
- Label: No Limit, Priority, Spiral Records
- Producer: Beats By the Pound, Master P, Carlos Stephens

Skull Dugrey chronology
Hoodlum fo' Life (1996)	These Wicked Streets (1998)

Professional ratings
Review scores
Source	Rating
Allmusic	link

Hoodlum fo' Life is the debut album released by rapper Skull Duggery, who was then known as Skull Dugrey. It was released on October 1, 1996, through No Limit Records, Spiral Records, and Priority Records, and was produced by Carlos Stephens and Master P. Hoodlum fo' Life charted to #29 on the Top R&B/Hip-Hop Albums and #8 on the Top Heatseekers. The album has sold 200,000 copies.

== Track listing ==
1. "Hoodlum" (featuring Dwane Michael a.k.a. Holloway of Ghetto Commission)
2. "Nigga Nigga Nigga"
3. "My Hood" (featuring Master P & Silkk The Shocker)
4. "T.S.O." (featuring Southern Type Soldiers, G9 a.k.a. Vellario of Ghetto Commission & Los)
5. "Mob Free Style"
6. "Mama Why" (featuring Pashion)
7. "Da' Lue"
8. "Episode"
9. "Expression"
10. "Deadly Thoughts"
11. "Crooked Ass Cops"
12. "Bring It On"
13. "My Shorty" (featuring Bryon Dolieo a.k.a. Dolliole of Ghetto Commission)
14. "Moss" (featuring Mo B. Dick)
15. "Dark Side" (Remix)
16. "Sea Level" (featuring G9 a.k.a. Vellario of Ghetto Commission, Recon & Gumbo)
17. "Street Life" (featuring Aynne "Ya Ya" Williams)
18. "Bro In Pen"
19. "Holocaust"
20. "The Circle"
