= Hoody Hooo =

Single by TRU

from the album Da Crime Family
- Released: May 10, 1999
- Recorded: 1998
- Genre: Southern rap, gangsta rap
- Length: 3:25
- Label: No Limit Records, Priority Records
- Songwriters: P. Miller, V. Miller, C. Miller
- Producers: Chantel Tremitiere and Beats By The Pound

TRU singles chronology
"I Always Feel Like" (1997)	"Hoody Hooo" (1999)	"Tru Homies" (1999)

"Hoody Hooo" is the lead single from TRU's album Da Crime Family. It was released on No Limit Records. The single was written by Master P, Silkk The Shocker, and C-Murder, and produced by then-WNBA athlete Chantel Tremitiere and Beats By the Pound's KLC. The song peaked at #31 on the Hot R&B/Hip-Hop Singles & Tracks.

== Sample credits ==
The song contains samples from the theme to the 1978 horror film, Halloween.

== Music video ==
The music video was shot in New Orleans, Louisiana. The video starts off with Master P, Silkk The Shocker, and C-Murder in a military base in the future. Also in the video, there are numerous occasions when female dancers are dancing to a white background. Although there appear to be a large number of dancers, there are actually only two thanks to the use of computer graphics. Most of the TRU members are wearing Ricky Williams jerseys, since he was still playing for the New Orleans Saints in 1999 when the video was filmed, and a client of No Limit Sports Management. Fiend, Mia X, Popeye and many more No Limit artists and affiliates are visible in the Calliope projects.

== Chart positions ==
Chart (1999)	Peak position
U.S. Billboard Bubbling Under Hot 100 Singles	4
U.S. Billboard Hot R&B/Hip-Hop Singles & Tracks	31
