= I Got the Hook Up (song) =

"I Got the Hook Up!"

Single by Master P and Sons of Funk

from the album I Got the Hook-Up! and The Game of Funk
- Released: March 24, 1998
- Recorded: 1998
- Genre: Hip-hop
- Length: 4:16
- Label: No Limit; Priority
- Songwriters: Percy Miller; Desmond D. Mapp; Rico Crowder; Gregory E. Mapp; Joshua Lorenzo Chew
- Producers: KLC; Sons of Funk

I Got the Hook-Up! singles chronology
"I Got the Hook Up!" (1998)	"Keep It Real" (1998)

Master P singles chronology
"Make 'Em Say Uhh!" (1998)	"I Got the Hook Up!" (1998)	"Thinkin' Bout U" (1998)

Sons of Funk singles chronology
"Pushin' Inside You" (1997)	"I Got the Hook Up!" (1998)	"Goodbye to My Homies" (1998)

Professional ratings
Review scores
Source	Rating
AllMusic	1.5/5 stars

"I Got the Hook Up!" is a song written and performed by American rapper Master P and fellow R&B group Sons of Funk. It was released on March 24, 1998 via No Limit/Priority Records as the lead single from I Got the Hook-Up! soundtrack. Produced by KLC and Sons of Funk, the song was later included in the latter's debut studio album The Game of Funk.

The song peaked at number 16 on the Billboard Hot 100, number 11 on the Hot R&B/Hip-Hop Songs, number 20 on the R&B/Hip-Hop Airplay, atop the Hot Rap Songs, and number 33 on the Rhythmic Airplay charts in the United States. It was certified gold by the Recording Industry Association of America on June 15, 1998, for selling 500,000 copies in the US alone. By the end of January 1999, the single has sold 700,000 units.

== Track listing ==
No.	Title	Writer(s)	Producer(s)	Length
1.	"I Got the Hook Up" (Album Version)	Percy Miller; Desmond D. Mapp; Rico Crowder; Gregory E. Mapp; Joshua Lorenzo Chew	KLC
2.	"I Got the Hook Up" (Instrumental Version)
3.	"I Got the Hook Up" (R&B Mix)
4.	"From What I Was Told"	James Tapp, Jr.	Carlos Stephens

== Personnel ==
- Percy "Master P" Miller – songwriter, vocals, executive producer
- Desmond D. Mapp – songwriter, vocals, producer
- Rico Crowder – songwriter, vocals, producer
- Gregory E. Mapp – songwriter, vocals, producer
- Joshua Lorenzo Chew – songwriter, vocals, producer
- Craig S. "KLC" Lawson – producer

== Charts ==
=== Weekly charts ===
Chart (1998)	Peak position
US Billboard Hot 100	16
US Hot R&B/Hip-Hop Songs (Billboard)	11
US R&B/Hip-Hop Airplay (Billboard)	20
US Hot Rap Songs (Billboard)	1
US Rhythmic Airplay (Billboard)	33

=== Year-end charts ===
Chart (1998)	Position
US Billboard Hot 100	67
US Hot R&B/Hip-Hop Songs (Billboard)	56

== Certifications ==
Region	Certification	Certified units/sales
United States (RIAA)	Gold	700,000
