= The Addiction (album) =

The Addiction: Hope Is Near

Studio album by Fiend
- Released: June 27, 2006
- Recorded: 2006
- Genre: Hip-hop
- Label: Fiend Entertainment
- Producer: Fiend, KLC

Fiend chronology
Go Hard or Go Home (2004)	The Addiction: Hope Is Near (2006)	The Best Of Fiend: Mr. Whomp Whomp (2007)

The Addiction: Hope Is Near is the seventh album released by rapper Fiend. It was released on June 27, 2006, for Fiend Entertainment and was produced by Fiend and Beats By the Pound members KLC & Craig B. The album peaked at No. 70 on the Billboard Top R&B/Hip-Hop Albums chart.

== Track listing ==
1. "Want It All"- 4:35 (feat. Hound)
2. "Thugg'n and Drugg'n"- 4:03
3. "Sell It"- 3:30
4. "Thug Shit"- 3:05
5. "That Iron Gang"- 3:49 (feat. Corner Boy P)
6. "Do Right, Do Better"- 3:34
7. "B.C.O.O.C.N."- 3:25
8. "Get it Bitch"- 4:44 (feat. Shorty Redd)
9. "Gotta Get It"- 4:22
10. "That's What U Want"- 4:46
11. "Press Play"- 3:23 (feat. Corner Boy P)
12. "Wired Up"- 3:28
13. "Oprah" (Color Purple)- 5:31
14. "What U Ain't"- 4:08
15. "What Is U Sayin"- 3:56
16. "Why iz U Playin'"- 3:48
17. "That's Survival"- 2:27
18. "Bottom of the Map"- 2:40 (feat. Corner Boy P & Calicoe)
