= No More Questions =

Studio album by Mr. Serv-On
- Released: March 18, 2003
- Recorded: 2002–2003
- Genre: Hip hop
- Label: Riviera Records
- Producers: Reem?, 50 Grand, Fame

Mr. Serv-On chronology
Take a Sip (2001)	No More Questions (2003)	Life Insurance 2 (Heart Muzik) (2008)

This is about the Mr. Serv-On album, for the song by Eazy-E please see Eazy-Duz-It§Track listing

Professional ratings
Review scores
Source	Rating
AllMusic	4/5 stars

No More Questions is the fifth album released by rapper Mr. Serv-On. It was released on March 18, 2003, through Riviera Records and Reem, 50 Grand and Fame. Mr. Serv-On has claimed that the album was titled No More Questions due to people constantly asking him why he left the popular No Limit Records label when he was at the height of his success.

== Track listing ==
1. "J-Webb Intro" – 2:38
2. "Soldier" – 4:41
3. "Where Dat Dope At (Where Dat Work At)" – 3:56
4. "Watching Me" – 4:42
5. "One More Time" – 3:32
6. "Fakeboy" – 2:52
7. "Serv' Em" – 3:00
8. "Lil Teezy" – 1:26
9. "The Game" – 6:47
10. "Serv-On Speaks" – 0:51
11. "New Orleans" – 3:41
12. "I Get Rock" – 3:42
13. "J-Webb Sex-Questions" – 1:03
14. "Good Pussy" – 5:39
15. "20's n Over" – 4:01
16. "Simple" – 4:15
17. "Who We Are" – 3:57
18. "I Like tha Way" – 4:02
19. "Walk Wit Me" – 4:37
20. "Serv-On Outro" – 1:55
