= Take a Sip =

Studio album by Mr. Serv-On
- Released: October 30, 2001
- Recorded: 2001
- Genre: Hip-hop
- Label: Lifetime Entertainment
- Producer: Court Dog, Smoove, Reem

Mr. Serv-On chronology
War Is Me, Pt. 1: Battle Decisions (2000)	Take a Sip (2001)	No More Questions (2003)

Take a Sip is the fourth album released by rapper, Mr. Serv-On. It was released on October 30, 2001, through Lifetime Entertainment and was produced by Court Dog, Smoove and Reem. It was his first album to not make it to any Billboard charts.

== Track listing ==
1. "Dedication"- :38
2. "Intro (Get Up Na)"- 5:17
3. "Gotta Get Dat"- 4:32
4. "Tak-A-Sip"- 3:04
5. "Apple Martinee"- 2:54
6. "Big Fine"- 4:00
7. "Guns Up"- 3:33
8. "Bullshitin'"- 2:24
9. "Here We Go"- 2:00
10. "Can't Deny It"- 4:24
11. "I Want Lose (Da War Song)"- 3:37
12. "Talk If Ya Want"- 2:13
13. "Work'em"- 3:39
14. "Push-N-Ya"- 3:37
15. "Calmdown Na"- 3:12
16. "Smoke Something"- 2:50
17. "Woop, Woop"- 3:31
18. "Fakeboyz, Fakegirlz"- 3:17
19. "Deez Nuts"- 4:30
20. "Xtra-Hot"- 1:53
21. "Shaggiest"- 3:16
22. "Da Conversation"- 4:18
