= Guaparation Canal =

Guaporation Canal

Mixtape by Mr. Serv-On
- Released: September 10, 2014
- Recorded: October 2013 – January 2014, New Orleans
- Genre: Hip-hop
- Label: Hot City Music
- Producer: Blac Kingpin

Mr. Serv-On chronology
Known Associates (2014)	Guaporation Canal (2014)

Guaporation Canal is the tenth album and third mixtape by American rapper Mr. Serv-On, released on September 10, 2014. It was produced by Blac Kingpin. On DatPiff.com, it says that the mixtape is under the alias Serv 4000, which is one of Mr. Serv-On's aliases.

== Track listing ==
1. Welcome to New Orleans
2. F.U. Serv (Ft. Fred Lee)
3. Been Bout It (Ft. Fred Lee)
4. Bitch Hoe (Ft Pearl White Ace Dollaz)
5. HotBlockShawty
6. Talkdat (Ft. Bumpy Big Zuse)
7. I'm Tired (Ft. Cutty Chealsea)
8. Hating (Ft. Jakk-Jo)
9. Lebron (Ft. Law Fleeze)
10. Talking Versace
11. I'm Getting
12. Paradise Girl (Ft. Cold Play)
13. I Am Serv (Ft. Magic)
14. Love Jones
15. I Represent
16. Hands On The Wall
17. I'm Sorry
18. I'm Outchere
19. Good Music
