= Remix Classics =

Remix album by Master P
- Released: September 20, 2005
- Recorded: 1991−2005
- Genre: Southern hip-hop, gangsta rap
- Label: Koch
- Producer: Drumma Boy, Master P

Master P chronology
Remix Classics (2005)	The Best of Master P (2005)

Professional ratings
Review scores
Source	Rating
AllMusic	3/5 stars

Remix Classics is a compilation album of remixes released by rapper, Master P. It was released on September 20, 2005, through Koch Records and reached No. 81 on the Billboard Top R&B/Hip-Hop Albums chart and No. 47 on the Top Independent Albums chart.

== Track listing ==
No.	Title	Length
1.	"Intro"	0:25
2.	"We Bout It" (featuring Black)	2:49
3.	"Got Cream" (featuring Black, Lil' D, Tank Dog)	4:46
4.	"We Bout That" (featuring Silkk the Shocker)	2:45
5.	"Cooked Crack" (featuring Silkk the Shocker, C-Murder)	4:08
6.	"My Heroes" (featuring Black, Tank Dog)	3:45
7.	"Street Talk"	0:29
8.	"Break Em" (featuring Black)	3:01
9.	"Thugettes" (featuring Snoop Dogg, Silkk the Shocker)	2:56
10.	"Keep It Real"	0:36
11.	"Get Em" (featuring Silkk the Shocker)	2:58
12.	"Say Ugh" (featuring Silkk the Shocker)	2:02
13.	"Update"	0:29
14.	"R.I.P. Homies" (featuring Silkk the Shocker)	4:12
15.	"P & Bone" (featuring Bone Thugs-n-Harmony)	4:42
16.	"Get Cash"	3:11
17.	"Chasing" (featuring Black Sopranos, Black, Tank Dog)	4:30
