= Internet Platinum =

Mixtape by Mr. Serv-On
- Released: May 31, 2011
- Recorded: 2010–2011, New Orleans
- Genre: Hip-hop
- Producer: Yung Mil

Mr. Serv-On chronology
Gangsta 1 More Time (2009)	Internet Platinum (2011)	Known Associates (2014)

Internet Platinum is the eighth studio album and second mixtape by American rapper Mr. Serv-On, released on May 31, 2011.

== Track listing ==
1. Internet Platinum Intro
2. 20 Bricks
3. Dude
4. Flight
5. Walk Like Me
6. This Is The South
7. Sexxin U
8. Late Night
9. Shawty
10. My Fi
11. 20 Bricks (Radio Version)
12. Lone Star State
13. Waiting
14. Fly Like A Bird
