= Known Associates =

Studio album by Mr. Serv-On and SC
- Released: March 4, 2014
- Recorded: 2014
- Genre: Hip hop

Mr. Serv-On album chronology
Internet Platinum (2011)	Known Associates (2014)	Guaporation Canal (2014)

Known Associates is the ninth studio album by Mr. Serv-On released on March 4, 2014. It was his first collaboration album. He collaborated with rapper SC on this album.

== Track listing ==
1. Known Associates Intro
2. Don't Make Me Get It (Ft. C-Robba & B-Eazy)
3. Like They Don't Know Me (Ft. Koopsta Knicca)
4. Gangster (Ft. Brotha Lynch Hung)
5. Investigation Continues
6. Coward (feat. Sunna Man, WISH & Diesel)
7. Smoke Again
8. Arrogant Money (feat. Justhis)
9. Mayor Is On the Team (Outro)
10. It's Goin' Down (feat. Q-Ballsilini)
