= Sons of Funk =

American R&B group

- Origin: Richmond, California, U.S.
- Genres: R&B, hip hop soul
- Years active: 1997–1999, 2014–present
- Labels: No Limit, Priority; S.O.F Music LLC; No Limit Forever
- Members: Joshua Lorenzo "Zo" Chew; Jerry "JP" Perkins; Desmond "Dez Dynamic" Mapp; Rico Crowder
- Past members: Gregory "G-Smooth" Mapp; Ricky J (deceased)
- Website: instagram.com/therealsonsoffunk

Sons of Funk is an American R&B group and production group from Richmond, California, United States, that were formerly artists on No Limit Records. They had great success in the late 1990s and are best known for their hit singles "Pushin Inside You" and "I Got the Hook Up!".

== Music career ==
=== 1997-98: The Game of Funk ===
By 1997, Sons of Funk was signed to No Limit Records by Master P, who had ties to Richmond, California. Their first mainstream appearance was on the soundtrack to I'm Bout It on the single Pushin' Inside You, which was also produced by the group. The single made it to number 97 on the Billboard Hot 100.

On April 21, 1998 Sons of Funk would release their debut album The Game of Funk on No Limit Records & Priority Records. The album would chart at #44 on the Billboard 200.

Sons of Funk appeared and produced the song "End Of The Road" on Silkk The Shocker's January 1999 album Made Man. In late 1999 the group would retire from the music industry for unknown reasons.

=== 2014-present: Reunion & The Lost Files, Vol. 1 ===
In 2014 the group would reunite, on January 8, 2015 they would release their second album together entitled The Lost Files, Vol. 1 via S.O.F. Music LLC, Sons of Funk also has new music video for the first single from the album entitled "Inside of You".

== Record production ==
The group also produced songs on Silkk the Shocker's Made Man and Mo B. Dick's Gangsta Harmony.

== Members ==
- Zo
- Dez
- Jerry
- Rico

== Discography ==
=== Studio albums ===
List of studio albums, with selected chart positions
Title	Album details	Peak chart positions	
Title	Album details	US	US R&B
The Game of Funk	Released: April 21, 1998; Label: No Limit, Priority; Formats: CD, MD, LP	44	14
The Lost Files, Vol. 1	Released: January 8, 2015; Label: S.O.F.; Formats: MD, LP	—	—

=== Soundtrack albums ===
List of soundtrack albums, with selected chart positions and certifications
Title	Album details	Peak chart positions		Certifications
Title	Album details	US	US R&B	Certifications
I'm Bout It (with Various artists)	Released: May 13, 1997; Label: No Limit, Priority; Formats: CD, MD, LP	4	1	RIAA: Platinum
I Got the Hook Up (with Various artists)	Released: April 7, 1998; Label: No Limit, Priority; Format: CD, MD, LP	3	1	RIAA: Platinum

== Singles ==
=== As lead artist ===
List of singles as lead artist, with selected chart positions and certifications, showing year released and album name
Title	Year	Peak chart positions			Album
Title	Year	US	US R&B	US Rap	Album
"Pushin' Inside You"	1997	97	—	—	I'm Bout It: Music from the Motion Picture & The Game of Funk
"Sons Reasons"	1998	—	—	—	The Game of Funk

=== As featured artist ===
List of singles as featured artist, with selected chart positions and certifications, showing year released and album name
Title	Year	Peak chart positions			Certifications	Album
Title	Year	US	US R&B	US Rap	Certifications	Album
"Take My Pain" (Fiend featuring Master P, Silkk The Shocker and Sons of Funk)	1998	—	11	—		There's One in Every Family
"I Got the Hook Up!" (Master P featuring Sons of Funk)	1998	16	11	1	RIAA: Gold	I Got the Hook Up: Music from the Motion Picture
"No Hope" (Magic featuring C-Murder, Lady TRU & Sons of Funk)	1998	—	—	—		Sky's the Limit
"Goodbye to My Homies" (Master P featuring Mo B. Dick, Sons of Funk and Silkk the Shocker)	1999	27	38	5		MP da Last Don

== See also ==
- No Limit Records
- No Limit Records discography
- Beats by the Pound
