= Who's da Killer? =

Studio album by TRU
- Released: 1993
- Recorded: 1992–1993
- Genre: Gangsta rap
- Length: 42:17
- Labels: No Limit / In-A-Minute / Me & Mine Entertainment
- Producers: Master P, E-A-Ski, Charles, CMT, Spoonie

TRU chronology
Understanding the Criminal Mind (1992)	Who's da Killer? (1993)	True (1995)

Professional ratings
Review scores
Source	Rating
Allmusic	1.5/5 stars

Who's da Killer? is the second album by TRU. It was released in 1993 through In-a-Minute Records and was produced by Master P, E-A-Ski, Charles, CMT and Spoonie. Tobin "TC" Costen's label, Me & Mine Entertainment, re-released the album for No Limit Records in 1998.

== Track listing ==
No.	Title	Length
1.	"Who's da Killa"	7:51
2.	"Life of a Gangsta"	3:40
3.	"Neighborhood Dopeman"	5:48
4.	"Talk About It"	4:52
5.	"Check Your Bitch"	5:54
6.	"Commercial"	0:15
7.	"Why You Wanna Fuck With Me"	2:59
8.	"Sweated by da Po Po's"	3:23
9.	"Ghetto Is a Trap"	3:36
10.	"Shouts Out"	6:39
