= Can I Burn? 2 =

Studio album by Fiend
- Released: May 13, 2003
- Recorded: 2002–2003
- Genre: Hip-hop
- Length: 1:04:57
- Label: Fiend Entertainment
- Producers: Brent Dixon; David Banner; Esco; Fiend; Jazze Pha; J-Boy; Ruh; Sinista

Fiend chronology
Dat's How It Happen to'M (2002)	Can I Burn? 2 (2003)	Go Hard or Go Home (2004)

Can I Burn? 2 is the fifth solo studio album by American rapper Fiend. It was released on May 13, 2003 via Fiend Entertainment. Production was handled by Brent Dixon, David Banner, Esco, Jazze Pha, J-Boy, Ruh, Sinista, and Fiend himself. It features guest appearances from Lil' Jon, Snoop Dogg, J-Boy, 8Ball, David Banner, Partners-N-Crime and T.B.K.S.

The album peaked at number 55 on the Top R&B/Hip-Hop Albums and number 36 on the Heatseekers Albums charts in the United States.

== Track listing ==
No.	Title	Producer(s)	Length
1.	"See Me"	David Banner	4:04
2.	"Stay N Ya Lane" (featuring 8Ball)	Fiend	4:42
3.	"Wanna Shut It Down" (featuring Partners-N-Crime)	Fiend; Sinista	3:26
4.	"Impekable"	Brent Dixon; Esco	4:32
5.	"From Round Here" (featuring Snoop Dogg and Lil' Jon)	Jazze Pha	3:26
6.	"Luv Me a P-Poppin Bitch" (featuring J-Boy)	Fiend	3:50
7.	"No Glamour Story"	Fiend	2:59
8.	"2 da Right" (Commercial)	Fiend	1:21
9.	"It Ain't Hard" (featuring J-Boy)	Fiend	4:28
10.	"Can I Burn?"	Ruh	4:01
11.	"Deep Shit" (featuring J-Boy)	J-Boy	3:12
12.	"Hardest Thing Outchere"	Fiend	4:34
13.	"4 N da Morinin'" (Commercial)	Fiend	1:10
14.	"My Shorty" (featuring David Banner)	David Banner	4:00
15.	"In Ya Face" (featuring J-Boy)	Fiend	5:07
16.	"Red, Black, and Green" (featuring T.B.K.S.)	Ruh	4:38
17.	"F.E. Thanks"		5:27
Total length:			1:04:57

== Charts ==
Chart (2003)	Peak position
US Top R&B/Hip-Hop Albums (Billboard)	55
US Independent Albums (Billboard)	36
