= Dat's How It Happen to'M =

Studio album by Da HeadBussaz
- Released: October 15, 2002
- Recorded: 2002
- Studios: Hypnotize Minds; Fiend Entertainment Studios
- Genres: Southern hip-hop; gangsta rap; crunk
- Length: 61:40
- Label: Hypnotize Minds
- Producers: DJ Paul; Juicy J

DJ Paul chronology
Underground Volume 16: For da Summa (2002)	Dat's How It Happen to'M (2002)	Da Unbreakables (2003)

Juicy J chronology
Chronicles of the Juice Man (2002)	Dat's How It Happen to'M (2002)	Da Unbreakables (2003)

Fiend chronology
Can I Burn? (2000)	Dat's How It Happen to'M (2002)	Can I Burn? 2 (2003)

Professional ratings
Review scores
Source	Rating
AllMusic	2/5 stars

Dat's How It Happen to'M is the only studio album by American hip-hop trio Da HeadBussaz, a collaboration between Three 6 Mafia members DJ Paul and Juicy J and Fiend. It was released on October 15, 2002 through Hypnotize Minds with distribution via Select-O-Hits. Recording sessions took place at Hypnotize Minds and Fiend Entertainment Studios. The production was handled by members DJ Paul and Juicy J. It features contributions from Crunchy Black, Project Pat, Frayser Boy, La Chat and Lord Infamous.

The album debuted at number 98 on the Billboard 200, number 15 on the Top R&B/Hip-Hop Albums and atop the Independent Albums charts in the United States.

There was a three-song promotional release ahead of the album, which contained "Where They Hang" (titled "Where Them Niggas Hang" on the promo), "Get the Fuck Out My Face" and "Hands On Ya".

== Track listing ==
All tracks are written by Paul Beauregard, Jordan Houston and Richard Jones.

No.	Title	Length
1.	"It's Bought to Happen to'M"	0:31
2.	"Where They Hang"	4:04
3.	"U See We Poe"	5:08
4.	"Head Bussaz"	4:28
5.	"How to Get Rid of a Dead Body"	1:14
6.	"That's How It Happen to'M"	4:22
7.	"Powder Cake"	4:19
8.	"Get the Fuck Out My Face"	4:58
9.	"Smoke If U Got It"	5:38
10.	"Hands on Ya"	4:45
11.	"Ruffest Niggaz Out"	3:59
12.	"Crap Table"	0:31
13.	"Crown Me"	4:43
14.	"Gone Be Sum Shit"	4:13
15.	"U See We Poe (Screwed)"	5:56
16.	"Hypnotize Minds & Fiend Ent."	2:51
Total length:		61:40

Notes

- Tracks 3 and 15 features uncredited additional vocals by Project Pat and Crunchy Black.
- Tracks 7 and 14 features uncredited additional vocals by Frayser Boy.
- Track 7 also features uncredited additional vocals by La Chat.
- Track 14 also features uncredited additional vocals by Lord Infamous.

== Charts ==
Chart (2002)	Peak position
US Billboard 200	98
US Top R&B/Hip-Hop Albums (Billboard)	15
US Independent Albums (Billboard)	1
