= Go Hard or Go Home (album) =

Studio album by Fiend
- Released: August 31, 2004
- Recorded: 2004
- Genre: Hip-hop
- Label: Fiend Entertainment
- Producer: Fiend, Beats By the Pound

Fiend chronology
Can I Burn? 2 (2003)	Go Hard or Go Home (2004)	The Addiction: Hope Is Near (2006)

Professional ratings
Review scores
Source	Rating
Allmusic	3.5/5 stars

Go Hard or Go Home is the sixth album released by rapper, Fiend. It was released on August 31, 2004 for his label Fiend Entertainment and was produced by him and his former No Limit labelmates, Beats By the Pound. Go Hard or Go Home peaked at No. 81 on the Billboard Top R&B/Hip-Hop Albums chart.

== Track listing ==
1. "Intro" – 0:19
2. "Baller 4 Real" – 4:13
3. "Two Mad M.F.'s" – 0:14
4. "U Can Get It" – 3:51 (feat. C-Loc & Ms. Peaches)
5. "Rollin w/Fe" – 3:36
6. "Get Bucked" – 4:00
7. "Smoking Intro" – 0:38
8. "Roll That, Light That" – 4:42 (feat. Jdawg)
9. "I'm Ya Problem" – 5:07 (feat. Jdawg)
10. "Around My Way" – 4:08
11. "Bout That Action" – 4:03 (feat. Hound)
12. "Let's Go" – 2:35 (feat. Jdawg)
13. "Already" – 2:51 (feat. Pee Wee)
14. "Cream Skit" – 0:50
15. "I'm Doing It" – 4:02
16. "Grab That" – 4:10 (feat. Young Hoggs)
17. "Never Been" – 3:49 (feat. Skull Duggery & Jdawg)
18. "Guns Up Fiend" – 3:08
