= I Won't Be Denied =

Won't Be Denied

Studio album by Fiend
- Released: November 14, 1995
- Recorded: 1994–1995
- Genre: Gangsta rap, Southern hip-hop
- Length: 40:24
- Label: Big Boy Records
- Producer: Leroy "Precise" Edwards

Fiend chronology
| Won't Be Denied (1995) | There's One in Every Family (1998) |

Professional ratings
Review scores
| Source | Rating |
|---|---|
| Allmusic | 3/5 stars |

Won't Be Denied is the debut album by the rapper Fiend. It was released on November 14, 1995 for Big Boy Records and was produced by Leroy "Precise" Edwards. The album did not make it to any charts, but Fiend would find greater success two years later when he signed with No Limit Records.

== Track listing ==
1. "Get It On" - 3:15
2. "I Won't Be Denied" - 4:01
3. "No Love" - 4:11 (featuring J-Dawg)
4. "Can't Lose" - 3:27
5. "Vib'n" - 3:32 (featuring Wild Wayne)
6. "Who's the Man" - 3:57
7. "Fiend" - 0:08
8. "Up Shit Creek" - 3:32
9. "Free Like the Wind" - 0:55
10. "The Baddest M.F. Alive" - 3:39
11. "All I See" - 2:05
12. "I Won't Be Denied" [Radio Edit] - 4:04
13. "The Baddest" [Radio Edit] - 3:35
