= Tru 2 da Game =

Studio album by TRU
- Released: February 18, 1997
- Recorded: 1996
- Genre: Southern hip-hop; gangsta rap; G-funk
- Length: 117:38
- Label: No Limit, Priority
- Producer: Beats By the Pound, K-Lou, DJ Daryl

TRU chronology
True (1995)	Tru 2 da Game (1997)	Da Crime Family (1999)

Singles from Tru 2 da Game
- 1. "I Always Feel Like" Released: January 21, 1997; 2. "FEDz" Released: 1997

Professional ratings
Review scores
Source	Rating
Allmusic	4/5 stars
The Rolling Stone Album Guide	3/5 stars

Tru 2 da Game is the fourth studio album released by New Orleans hip-hop group, TRU. It was released February 18, 1997 on No Limit Records and was produced by Beats By the Pound. The album found a large amount of success, peaking at #8 on the Billboard 200 and #2 on the Top R&B/Hip-Hop Albums selling 200,000 copies in its first week. A single from the album entitled "I Always Feel Like" also found some success, peaking at #71 on the Billboard Hot 100, #11 on the Hot Rap Singles and #42 on the Hot R&B/Hip-Hop Singles & Tracks. The same year the album was re-released with the song "Smoking Green" removed. The re-released version included three new songs, a club mix version of "No Limit Soldiers", a C-Murder solo song "Eyes Of A Killa" and a Silkk The Shocker solo song "Pimp Shit." "FEDz" samples Aaliyah's hit single "If Your Girl Only Knew". The album was certified 2× Platinum by the RIAA, on October 2, 1997, and remains the group's most successful album.

== Track listing ==
=== Original release ===
Disc 1
No.	Title	Producer(s)	Length
1.	"Intro" (Master P & Lil' Romeo)		2:47
2.	"No Limit Soldier" (Master P, Silkk the Shocker, C-Murder & Mia X)	KLC & Mo B. Dick	7:04
3.	"I Always Feel Like..." (Master P, Silkk the Shocker, Mia X & Mo B. Dick)	Craig B & KLC	5:07
4.	"There Dey Go" (Master P & Silkk the Shocker)	Craig B & KLC	4:38
5.	"I Got Candy" (Silkk the Shocker, Master P & Mo B. Dick)	KLC & Mo B. Dick	4:23
6.	"Ghetto Thang" (Master P, Silkk the Shocker & Big Ed)	K-Lou	3:54
7.	"FEDz" (C-Murder, Master P, Silkk the Shocker & Mia X)	Mo B. Dick	5:42
8.	"What They Call Us?" (Master P, Silkk the Shocker & C-Murder)	KLC	5:51
9.	"Smoking Green" (Master P & Mo B. Dick)	Craig B	5:52
10.	"Gangstas Make The World" (Silkk the Shocker, Master P, C-Murder & Mr. Serv-On)	Mo B. Dick	4:57
11.	"Swamp Nigga" (Master P)	KLC	5:14
12.	"Ghetto Cheeze" (Master P & Silkk the Shocker)	DJ Daryl	4:25
13.	"Heaven 4 A Gangsta (TRU Remix)" (Master P, Silkk the Shocker & C-Murder)	Craig B, KLC & Mo B. Dick	4:41

Disc 2
No.	Title	Producer(s)	Length
1.	"TRU 2 Da Game" (Master P, Silkk the Shocker, Big Ed & Mr. Serv-On)	K-Lou	4:53
2.	"Freak Hoes" (Master P, Silkk the Shocker & Mia X)	KLC	3:49
3.	"TRU ?s" (C-Murder)	Craig B	4:11
4.	"1nce Upon A Time" (Silkk the Shocker & C-Loc)	KLC	2:15
5.	"Pop Goes My 9" (Silkk the Shocker, Master P, Kane & Abel & Mo B. Dick)	Mo B. Dick	4:46
6.	"It's My Time" (Mia X)	Craig B	2:51
7.	"Torcher Chamber" (C-Murder)	Mo B. Dick	3:30
8.	"They Can't Stop Us!" (Master P & Silkk the Shocker)	KLC	4:57
9.	"The Lord Is Testin' Me" (C-Murder, Silkk the Shocker & Master P)	KLC	5:42
10.	"Final Ride" (Master P, Silkk the Shocker & C-Murder)	Craig B	6:03

=== Re-release ===
Disc 1
No.	Title	Producer(s)	Length
1.	"Intro" (Master P & Lil' Romeo)		2:47
2.	"No Limit Soldier" (Master P, Silkk the Shocker, C-Murder & Mia X)	KLC & Mo B. Dick	7:04
3.	"I Always Feel Like" (Master P, Silkk the Shocker, Mia X & Mo B. Dick)	Craig B & KLC	5:07
4.	"There Dey Go" (Master P & Silkk the Shocker)	Craig B & KLC	4:38
5.	"I Got Candy" (Silkk the Shocker, Master P & Mo B. Dick)	KLC & Mo B. Dick	4:23
6.	"Ghetto Thang" (Master P, Silkk the Shocker & Big Ed)	K-Lou	3:54
7.	"FEDz" (C-Murder, Master P, Silkk the Shocker & Mia X)	Mo B. Dick	5:42
8.	"What They Call Us?" (Master P, Silkk the Shocker & C-Murder)	KLC	5:51
9.	"Gangstas Make The World" (Silkk the Shocker, Master P, C-Murder & Mr. Serv-On)	Mo B. Dick	4:57
10.	"Swamp Nigga" (Master P)	KLC	5:14
11.	"Pimp Shit" (Silkk the Shocker)	Craig B	4:23
12.	"Eyes Of A Killa" (C-Murder)	Craig B, KLC, Mo B. Dick	4:09
13.	"FEDz (Radio Version)" (C-Murder, Master P, Silkk the Shocker & Mia X)	Mo B. Dick	5:42

Disc 2
No.	Title	Producer(s)	Length
1.	"Ghetto Cheeze" (Master P & Silkk the Shocker)	DJ Daryl	4:25
2.	"Heaven 4 A Gangsta (TRU Remix)" (Master P, Silkk the Shocker & C-Murder)	Craig B, KLC & Mo B. Dick	4:41
3.	"TRU 2 Da Game" (Master P, Silkk the Shocker, Big Ed & Mr. Serv-On)	K-Lou	4:53
4.	"Freak Hoes" (Master P, Silkk the Shocker & Mia X)	KLC	3:49
5.	"TRU ?s" (C-Murder)	Craig B	4:11
6.	"1nce Upon A Time" (Silkk the Shocker & C-Loc)	KLC	2:15
7.	"Pop Goes My 9" (Silkk the Shocker, Master P, Kane & Abel & Mo B. Dick)	Mo B. Dick	4:46
8.	"It's My Time" (Mia X)	Craig B	2:51
9.	"Torcher Chamber" (C-Murder)	Mo B. Dick	3:30
10.	"They Can't Stop Us!" (Master P & Silkk the Shocker)	KLC	4:57
11.	"The Lord Is Testin' Me" (C-Murder, Silkk the Shocker & Master P)	KLC	5:42
12.	"No Limit Soldiers (Club Mix)" (Master P, Silkk the Shocker, C-Murder & Mia X)	KLC	7:04
13.	"Final Ride" (Master P, Silkk the Shocker & C-Murder)	Craig B	6:03

=== Sample credits ===
- "I Always Feel Like..." samples "Somebody's Watching Me" by Rockwell featuring Michael Jackson.
- "I Got Candy" samples "Candy" by Cameo.
- "FEDz" samples "If Your Girl Only Knew" by Aaliyah.
- "Smoking Green" samples "Summer Breeze" by Seals & Crofts.
- "TRU 2 Da Game" samples "Why Have I Lost You?" by Cameo.
- "Pop Goes My 9" samples "(Pop, Pop, Pop, Pop) Goes My Mind" by LeVert.
- "TRU ?'s" samples "No More ?'s" by Eazy-E.

== Charts ==
=== Weekly charts ===
Chart (1997)	Peak position
US Billboard 200	8
US Top R&B/Hip-Hop Albums (Billboard)	2

=== Year-end charts ===
Chart (1997)	Position
US Billboard 200	77
US Top R&B/Hip-Hop Albums (Billboard)	18

== Certifications ==
Region	Certification	Certified units/sales
United States (RIAA)	2× Platinum	2,000,000^{^}
^{^} Shipments figures based on certification alone.
