= I Always Feel Like =

Single by TRU

from the album Tru 2 da Game
- Released: January 21, 1997
- Recorded: 1996
- Genre: Hip-hop
- Length: 29:12
- Label: No Limit; Priority
- Songwriters: Percy Miller; Vyshonn Miller; Mia Young
- Producers: Mo B. Dick; KLC; Craig B

TRU singles chronology
| "Tell Them What's Goin' On / The Ghetto Is a Trap" (1993) | "I Always Feel Like" (1997) | "Tru Homies" (1999) |

"I Always Feel Like" is a song written and performed by TRU. It was released on January 21, 1997, via No Limit/Priority Records as the lead single from the group's fourth studio album Tru 2 da Game. Produced at No Limit Studios by Beats By the Pound members Mo B. Dick, KLC and Craig B., the song incorporated the melody and contained re-sung elements of Rockwell's 1984 hit "Somebody's Watching Me", with Mo B. Dick singing the hook from the original song.

Released less than a month before Tru 2 da Game, "I Always Feel Like" became the group's most successful single, reaching number 71 on the Billboard Hot 100, number 27 on the Hot R&B/Hip-Hop Songs and number 11 on the Hot Rap Songs charts in the United States.

== Track listing ==
| No. | Title | Writer(s) | Producer(s) | Length |
|---|---|---|---|---|
| 1. | "I Always Feel Like (Radio Version)" | Percy Miller; Vyshonn Miller; Mia Young | Mo B. Dick; KLC; Craig B | 4:15 |
| 2. | "I Always Feel Like (Street Version)" | P. Miller; V. Miller; Young | Mo B. Dick; KLC; Craig B | 5:40 |
| 3. | "Pimp Sh.." | V. Miller | Craig B | 4:25 |
| 4. | "Eyes of a Killa" | Corey Miller | Mo B. Dick; KLC; Craig B | 4:11 |
| 5. | "I Always Feel Like (Album Version)" | P. Miller; V. Miller; Young | Mo B. Dick; KLC; Craig B | 5:10 |
| 6. | "I Always Feel Like (Instrumental)" | P. Miller; V. Miller; Young | Mo B. Dick; KLC; Craig B | 5:31 |
| Total length: | | | | 29:12 |

== Personnel ==
- Percy "Master P" Miller – vocals (tracks: 1, 2, 5, 6), executive producer
- Vyshonn "Silkk the Shocker" Miller – vocals (tracks: 1–3, 5, 6)
- Mia "Mia X" Young – vocals (tracks: 1, 2, 5, 6)
- Raymond "Mo B. Dick" Poole – vocals (tracks: 1, 2, 5, 6), producer (tracks: 1, 2, 4–6)
- Corey "C-Murder" Miller – vocals (track 4)
- Craig "KLC" Lawson – producer (tracks: 1, 2, 4–6)
- Craig Bazile – producer
- Martin Bambanian – design
- Barbara Pescosolido – cover photo

== Charts ==
=== Weekly charts ===
| Chart (1997) | Peak position |
|---|---|
| US Billboard Hot 100 | 71 |
| US Hot R&B/Hip-Hop Songs (Billboard) | 42 |
| US Hot Rap Songs (Billboard) | 11 |

=== Year-end charts ===
| Chart (1997) | Position |
|---|---|
| US Hot Rap Singles (Billboard) | 32 |
