= Espionage (album) =

2003 album by Steady Mobb'n

Studio album by Steady Mobb'n
- Released: July 1, 2003
- Recorded: 2003
- Genre: West Coast hip hop, gangsta rap
- Length: 1:01:11
- Label: Big Body Entertainment
- Producer: Harm, Ronski, Poe

Steady Mobb'n chronology
Crime Buddies (2001)	Espionage (2003)

Espionage is the fourth and final studio album released by American hip hop duo Steady Mobb'n (spelled as Steady Mobbin on the cover). It was released independently through Big Body Entertainment and was produced by Harm, Ronski and Poe. The album featured guest appearances from fellow Californian rappers B-Legit, Delinquents, Keak da Sneak and Too $hort.

== Track listing ==
No.	Title	Length
1.	"Radio Skit" (feat. Sho Dawg and Jerry Turner)	1:52
2.	"Steady Mobbin" (feat. B-Legit)	3:47
3.	"Fire Up the Doopie"	3:07
4.	"I'm Like" (feat. The Delinquents)	4:00
5.	"Busta's Be"	3:51
6.	"Reppin' the O" (feat. Keak da Sneak)	3:19
7.	"Bootleg" (feat. Sho Dawg)	0:31
8.	"In the Paper"	4:43
9.	"Y'all Don't Want Funk"	3:00
10.	"Watch Your Back"	4:39
11.	"The Man"	4:39
12.	"I'm Stuntin' on Ya"	3:12
13.	"Pimp Skit" (feat. Sho Dawg and Double R)	1:35
14.	"Pimpin'" (feat. Too $hort)	3:59
15.	"Choosin' on Me"	3:05
16.	"Don't Hate the Game"	3:10
17.	"Fuck Wit Us" (feat. Sho Dawg)	3:42
18.	"Black Mafia Family" (feat. Sho Dawg, Young Gunz, Nephews, and Squeeze)	2:55
19.	"If You Want It"	3:33

== Personnel ==
- Billy Bathgate - primary artist
- Crooked Eye - primary artist
- B-Legit - guest artist
- The Delinquents - guest artist
- Keak da Sneak - guest artist
- Too Short - guest artist, composer
- Sho Dawg - guest artist
- Jerry Turner - guest artist
- Young Gunz - guest artist
- Nephews - guest artist
- Squeeze - guest artist
- Double R - guest artist
- Willie Young - executive producer
- Harm - producer
- Poe - producer
- Ronski - producer
- Glenn Tilbrook - composer
- Chris Difford - composer
