= The Truth (TRU album) =

Studio album by TRU
- Released: February 22, 2005
- Recorded: 2004–2005
- Genres: Southern hip-hop, gangsta rap
- Length: 60:00
- Labels: The New No Limit, Koch Records
- Producers: Master P (exec.); Drumma Boy (exec.); Kaos; Myke Diesel; Bass Heavy

TRU chronology
Da Crime Family (1999)	The Truth (2005)	The Best of TRU (2005)

Professional ratings
Review scores
Source	Rating
Allmusic	3/5 stars
RapReviews	(7/10)

The Truth is the sixth and final studio album released by American Southern hip-hop group, TRU. It was released on February 22, 2005, on The New No Limit. The production was handled by Master P, Drumma Boy, Kaos, Myke Diesel and Bass Heavy. Compared to the previous two TRU albums, The Truth only found minor success selling 45,000 copies, peaking at No. 54 on the Billboard 200, No. 15 on the Top R&B/Hip-Hop Albums and No. 2 on the Independent Albums. A chopped and screwed version of the album mixed by Michael 5000 Watts was released on April 26, 2005. By December 2005 the album sold about 200,000 copies.

== Background ==
Since 1999, a new TRU project, then titled Da Miller Boyz, was teased. However, the original project was shelved due to creative differences between C-Murder and Master P.

Due to the incarceration of C-Murder, newcomer Halleluyah took his place in the album's recording process. TRU Member C-Murder makes an appearance only on one song due to his incarceration at the time.

== Track listing ==
No.	Title	Length
1.	"Where U From" (Master P, Silkk The Shocker & Halleluyah)	4:35
2.	"Photo Book" (Master P, Silkk The Shocker & Lil' Romeo)	4:35
3.	"Go Off" (Master P, Halleluyah, Afficial)	4:06
4.	"Stressin'" (C-Murder)	3:20
5.	"Street 'Army" (Master P, Halleluyah & Afficial)	5:17
6.	"Drama" (Master P & Halleluyah)	3:12
7.	"Welcome to New Orleans" (Halleluyah)	4:07
8.	"You Ain't Sayin Nothin'" (Master P, Afficial & Mr. Stra)	4:06
9.	"Shake It" (Master P & Halleluyah)	3:17
10.	"Sea Saw for Me" (Master P, Halleluyah & Ashley)	2:47
11.	"Hood & Street" (Halleluyah, Jazz & Yougi)	4:39
12.	"Headhunter" (Master P & Halleluyah)	3:03
13.	"Squeeze" (Silkk The Shocker & Halleluyah)	3:32
14.	"Buckle Up" (Blakk, C-Los & Master P)	4:00
15.	"Ride" (Master P & Halleluyah)	2:56
16.	"Point 'Em Out" (Master P, Halleluyah & Silkk The Shocker)	4:24
17.	"Here We Come" (Master P & Ashley)	3:27
