= Understanding the Criminal Mind =

Studio album by TRU
- Released: August 2 1992
- Recorded: 1991–1992
- Genre: Gangsta rap
- Length: 38:31
- Labels: In a Minute Records, No Limit Records
- Producers: Master P, E-A-Ski, CMT, K-Lou

TRU chronology
Understanding the Criminal Mind (1992)	Who's da Killer? (1993)

Professional ratings
Review scores
Source	Rating
Allmusic	1.5/5 stars

Understanding the Criminal Mind is the debut album released by TRU. It was released in 1992 for In-a-Minute Records and was produced by Master P, E-A-Ski, CMT and K-Lou. It was later re-released in 1998 for No Limit Records.

== Track listing ==
No.	Title	Length
1.	"Nigga's From Calli"	4:27
2.	"Fuck That Shit"	4:12
3.	"Let's Do It"	3:50
4.	"Little Slut"	3:45
5.	"Fuck the System"	4:33
6.	"Tell Them What's Going On"	3:32
7.	"I Ain't Going Out That Way"	3:42
8.	"I'm The Funkest"	3:21
9.	"I Wear a Bullet Proof Vest"	3:24
10.	"Understanding the Criminal Mind"	4:24
11.	"1900Crime"	1:27
