= Steady Mobb'n =

American hip hop group

- Crooked Eye and Bavgate in 1998

Background information
- Origin: Oakland, California
- Genres: Hip-hop
- Years active: 1994–2003
- Labels: Black Mafia, Thizz Entertainment, No Limit, Priority, Bomb Shelter, Colcash (Former)
- Members: Crooked Eye; Bavgate

Steady Mobb'n was an American hip hop duo composed of Crooked Eye and Billy Bathgate, from the Ghost Town section of West Oakland. The duo were formally signed to No Limit Records & Bomb Shelter Entertainment in the late 1990s.

== Music career ==
In 1995, Steady Mobb'n released a cassette EP titled Blood Money. Two years later the duo joined rapper/entrepreneur Master P's No Limit Records, and collaborated with Master P on the single "If I Could Change", which was produced by No Limit Records in-house producer DJ Daryl and served as the first single from the I'm Bout It soundtrack. Steady Mobb'n's debut album, Pre-Meditated Drama, was released in May 1997 and gave them their biggest chart success, peaking at #29 on the Billboard Hot 200 and #6 on Top R&B/Hip-Hop Albums. However, after the commercial disappointment of their 1998 follow-up, Black Mafia (#82 on the Billboard 200, #19 on Top R&B/Hip-Hop Albums), Steady Mobb'n departed No Limit.

In 2001, Steady Mobb'n reunited with No Limit producer DJ Daryl and signed with his label Bomb Shelter Music. Their third album, Crime Buddies, was released that year but failed to chart. In 2003, they released their fourth and final record, the non-charting Espionage, on the independent Big Body Entertainment. The duo split up thereafter.

== Solo careers ==
Billy Bathgate changed his name to Bavgate and signed with Thizz Entertainment.

As of October 2019, Crooked Eye (real name Aaron Edmond) was living in a homeless encampment in Oakland, California.

== Discography ==
=== Studio albums ===
List of studio albums, with selected chart positions
Title	Album details	Peak chart positions	
Title	Album details	US	US R&B
Pre-Meditated Drama	Released: May 6, 1997; Label: No Limit, Priority; Format: CD, Cassette, MD, LP	29	6
Black Mafia	Released: November 24, 1998; Label: No Limit, Priority; Format: CD, MD, LP	82	19
Crime Buddies	Released: August 7, 2001; Label: Bomb Shelter; Format: CD, MD, LP	—	—
Espionage	Released: July 1, 2003; Label: Black Mafia, Big Body; Format: CD, MD, LP	—	—

=== Extended plays ===
List of albums, with selected chart positions
Title	Album details	Peak chart positions	
Title	Album details	US	US R&B
Blood Money	Released: 1995; Label: GT Productions; Format: Cassette, EP	—	—

=== Soundtrack albums ===
List of soundtrack albums, with selected chart positions and certifications
Title	Album details	Peak chart positions		Certifications
Title	Album details	US	US R&B	Certifications
I'm Bout It (with Various artists)	Released: May 13, 1997; Label: No Limit, Priority; Formats: CD, MD, LP	4	1	RIAA: Platinum
I Got the Hook Up (with Various artists)	Released: April 7, 1998; Label: No Limit, Priority; Format: CD, MD, LP	3	1	RIAA: Platinum

=== Compilation albums ===
List of compilation albums, with selected chart positions and certifications
Title	Album details	Peak chart positions		Certifications
Title	Album details	US	US R&B	Certifications
Mean Green: Major Players Compilation (with Various artist)	Released: September 28, 1998; Label: No Limit, Priority; Formats: CD, MD, LP	9	6	RIAA: Gold

=== As lead artist ===
List of singles as lead artist, with selected chart positions and certifications, showing year released and album name
Title	Year	Peak chart positions			Album
Title	Year	US	US R&B	US Rap	Album
"Ghetto Life" (featuring Snoop Dogg)	1998	—	—	—	Black Mafia
"Bang To This"	2001	—	—	—	Crime Buddies

=== As featured artist ===
List of singles as lead artist, with selected chart positions and certifications, showing year released and album name
Title	Year	Peak chart positions			Album
Title	Year	US	US R&B	US Rap	Album
"Game of Life" (Snoop Dogg featuring Steady Mobb'n)	1998	—	—	—	Da Game Is to Be Sold, Not to Be Told

=== Collaboration singles ===
List of collaboration singles, with selected chart positions, showing year released and album name
Title	Year	Peak chart positions			Album
Title	Year	US	US R&B	US Rap	Album
"If I Could Change" (with Master P, Mia X, Mo B. Dick & O'Dell)	1997	48	23	7	I'm Bout It: Music from the Motion Picture
