= True (TRU album) =

Studio album by TRU
- Released: July 25, 1995
- Recorded: 1994–1995
- Genre: Gangsta rap, G-funk
- Length: 73:49
- Label: No Limit Records, Priority Records
- Producer: Al "Baby Jesus" Eaton, Kenneth Darnell Franklin, Percy Robert Miller (Master P), Raymond Emile Poole (Mo B. Dick), Daryl Lee Anderson (DJ Daryl), Craig Stephen Lawson (Craig), Larry Dodson (Larry D), Mark Ogleton (CMT), Shon Adams (E-A-Ski), Vyshonne Miller (Silkk the Shocker)

TRU chronology
| Who's da Killer? (1993) | True (1995) | Tru 2 da Game (1997) |

Professional ratings
Review scores
| Source | Rating |
|---|---|
| Allmusic | 2.5/5 stars |

True is the third studio album released by rap group, TRU. The album was released on July 25, 1995 for No Limit Records and features production from Al "Baby Jesus" Eaton, Kenneth Darnell Franklin, Percy Robert Miller (Master P), and Raymond Emile Poole (Mo B. Dick). Producer's Daryl Lee Anderson (DJ Daryl), Craig Stephen Lawson (Craig), Larry Dodson (Larry D), Mark Ogleton (CMT), Shon Adams (E-A-Ski), and Vyshonne Miller (Silkk the Shocker) are also featured on individual tracks. This was the group's first major released after two independent albums and it managed to make it to #25 on the Top R&B/Hip-Hop Albums and #14 on the Top Heatseekers.

== Track listing ==
| No. | Title | Length |
|---|---|---|
| 1. | "Intro" | 1:01 |
| 2. | "Last Dance" (Master P & C-Murder featuring Mia X) | 4:31 |
| 3. | "That's How We Break Bread" (Master P & King George Featuring C-Bo) | 3:28 |
| 4. | "Mobbin Through My Hood" (Master P, C-Murder, Silkk The Shocker, Big Ed & King George) | 3:36 |
| 5. | "Living That Life" (Master P & Silkk The Shocker featuring Carmen Taylor) | 4:40 |
| 6. | "Another Day, Another Dollar" (Master P & Silkk The Shocker) | 4:00 |
| 7. | "Watch Your Ass" (Skit) | 1:06 |
| 8. | "Walk Like A Killer" (Master P, Silkk The Shocker & King George) | 4:58 |
| 9. | "Commercial" (Skit) | 0:51 |
| 10. | "Anything Goes" (Master P, Silkk The Shocker, Big Ed & King George) | 3:21 |
| 11. | "I'm Bout' It, Bout It" (Master P featuring Mia X) | 5:30 |
| 12. | "Fuck Them Hoes" (Master P & Silkk The Shocker featuring Mia X) | 4:44 |
| 13. | "Ain't No Glock-Produced by Larry D. Henderson" (Master P & C-Murder) | 2:49 |
| 14. | "Rev Do Wrong" (Skit) | 1:48 |
| 15. | "TRU Playaz" (Master P & Silkk The Shocker, Big Ed & King George featuring Mr. Serv-On) | 4:41 |
| 16. | "Would You Take a Bullet for Your Homie?-Co-Produced by Larry D. Henderson" (Master P, Silkk The Shocker & Big Ed) | 4:49 |
| 17. | "3 Strikes" (Master P & King George featuring Tobin Casten) | 2:53 |
| 18. | "Keep It Jumping" (Master P & Big Ed) | 4:17 |
| 19. | "Keep It All Good-Produced by Larry D. Henderson" (Master P & Silkk The Shocker) | 5:56 |
| 20. | "Shouts Out" | 4:50 |
