= Full Blooded =

American rapper

- Origin: Gert Town, New Orleans, Louisiana, U.S.
- Genres: Hip hop; gangsta rap
- Occupation: Rapper
- Instrument: Vocals
- Years active: 1995–present
- Labels: No Limit, Priority

Full Blooded (also known as Da Hound) is an American rapper formerly signed to Master P's No Limit Records in the late 1990s.

Full Blooded made his debut in 1995 (credited as Hounds from Gert Town) on the song “Murder Weapon” off the No Limit compilation album Down South Hustlers: Bouncin’ and Swingin’ and later in 1998 on C-Murder's debut album Life or Death on the song titled "On The Run" and on the song titled "Ghetto Ties". He would continue to make guest appearances on several No Limit albums before releasing his debut album Memorial Day on December 1, 1998. Unlike most No Limit albums, Memorial Day was a commercial disappointment, only reaching number 112 on the Billboard 200. Full Blooded left No Limit shortly after and released his second album, Untamed in 2001.

== Discography ==
=== Studio albums ===
List of studio albums, with selected chart positions
Title	Album details	Peak chart positions	
Title	Album details	US	US R&B
Memorial Day	Released: December 1, 1998; Label: No Limit, Priority; Format: CD, MD, LP	112	20

=== Collaboration albums ===
List of collaboration albums, with selected chart positions
Title	Album details	Peak chart positions	
Title	Album details	US	US R&B
Untamed (with H.O.U.N.D. Faculty)	Released: November 13, 2001; Label: Red Dawg; Format: CD, digital download, LP	—	—

=== Compilation albums ===
List of compilation albums, with selected chart positions and certifications
Title	Album details	Peak chart positions	
Title	Album details	US	US R&B
We Can't Be Stopped (with No Limit)	Released: September 28, 1998; Label: No Limit/Priority; Formats: CD, LP	19	2

== Singles ==
=== As lead artist ===
List of singles as lead artist, with selected chart positions and certifications, showing year released and album name
Title	Year	Peak chart positions			Album
Title	Year	US	US R&B	US Rap	Album
"Quickest Way To Die" (featuring Mo B. Dick & The Hounds of Gert Town)	1998	—	—	—	Memorial Day
"What It Be Like" (with H.O.U.N.D. Faculty featuring Fiend)	2001	—	—	—	Untamed
