= Skull Duggery (rapper) =

American rapper (1971–2022)

- Born: Andrew Jordan; September 24, 1971
- Origin: New Orleans, Louisiana, U.S.
- Died: June 4, 2022 (aged 50)
- Genres: Hip-hop
- Occupations: Rapper; record producer
- Years active: 1992–2022
- Labels: No Limit; Priority; Penalty; Tommy Boy

Andrew Jordan (September 24, 1971 – June 4, 2022), better known as Skull Duggery, was an American rapper best known for his time spent with Master P's No Limit Records in the late 1990s.

Skull Duggery made his first appearance on No Limit's 1995 compilation, Down South Hustlers: Bouncin' and Swingin' on the song entitled "Darkside". About a year later, Master P released a trailer on Silkk the Shocker's first album The Shocker promoting Duggery's debut album, and setting the album's release date for September 24, 1996, but the release was pushed back to a week later. Skull Duggery released Hoodlum Fo' Life on October 1, 1996, under the alias Skull Dugrey, but the album failed to sell well, only peaking at #29 on the Top R&B/Hip-Hop Albums and #8 on the Top Heatseekers. His next album, 1998's These Wicked Streets fared better, making it to #21 on the Billboard 200 and #4 on the Top R&B/Hip-Hop Albums chart.

After leaving No Limit in 1999, Skull Duggery independently released 2000's 3rd Ward Stepper and 2003's Controversy.

== Legal issues ==
On September 25, 2009, Jordan was arrested after police searched his Baton Rouge home. Authorities executing a search warrant found many violent child pornography videos on his computer. Authorities also found a .223 caliber rifle, a .40 caliber handgun, and marijuana. On April 11, 2011, he was sentenced to six years in prison.

== Death ==
On June 4, 2022, Jordan's death was announced by his niece. The cause of death was not disclosed.

== Discography ==
Year	Album	Peak chart positions	
Year	Album	U.S.	U.S. R&B
1996	Hoodlum fo' Life: Released: October 1, 1996; Label: No Limit / Priority	–	29
1998	These Wicked Streets: Released: September 8, 1998; Label: No Limit / Penalty Records	21	4
2000	3rd Ward Stepper: Released: June 6, 2000; Label: Crash	–	–
2003	Controversy: Released: March 4, 2003; Label: Unlimited	–	–
