= Big Ed (rapper) =

Musical artist (1971–2001)

Background information
- Also known as: Big Ed the Assassin
- Born: Edward Lee Knight; November 2, 1971; Richmond, California, U.S.
- Died: July 8, 2001 (aged 29)
- Genres: Hip hop; gangsta rap
- Occupation: Rapper
- Years active: 1992–2001
- Labels: Special Forces Records; No Limit Records; Priority Records

Edward Lee Knight (November 2, 1971 – July 8, 2001), best known by his stage name Big Ed the Assassin, often shortened to Big Ed, was an American rapper.

Knight was signed to Master P's No Limit Records in 1992 and featured on several of its releases during the 1990s, including those by Master P, C-Murder, Mac and Soulja Slim. It released his debut album, The Assassin, in 1998.

Knight left No Limit in 2000, starting his own label, Special Forces Records. He released his second album, Special Forces, on May 9, 2000. His third and final album, Edward Lee Knight 1971-2001, was released posthumously in August 2001.

== Early life ==
Knight was born in Richmond, California, and attended Eastern Washington University from 1992 to 1993 on a basketball scholarship, but dropped out to pursue a career in rap music in the Bay Area with Master P's West Coast Bad Boy Clique.

== Career ==
Big Ed was an original member of the rap group TRU (The Real Untouchables), appearing on the group's first three albums, Who's Da Killer?, Understanding the Criminal Mind and True. Throughout the 90s, Ed had guest spots on many of No Limit's other releases such as Master P's 99 Ways to Die, Silkk the Shocker's debut The Shocker and Mia X's Unlady Like.

=== Solo career ===
==== The Assassin and Special Forces Records ====
Big Ed's debut album, The Assassin, was released on September 1, 1998, and peaked at #15 on the Billboard 200 and #3 on the Top R&B/Hip-Hop Albums.

In 2000, Big Ed left No Limit to start his own record label, Special Forces Records. He released his second album through this label, 2000's Special Forces, which featured contributions from his former No Limit labelmates.

== Death ==
Big Ed the Assassin died from lymphoma on July 8, 2001. His third album, Edward Lee Knight 1971-2001, was released posthumously the next month.

== Discography ==
=== Studio albums ===
Title	Release	Peak chart positions	
Title	Release	US	US R&B
The Assassin	1998	15	3
Special Forces	2000	—	25
Edward Lee Knight 1971–2001	2001	—	—
