= TRU (group) =

American hip hop group

Background information
- Also known as: The Real Untouchables
- Origin: Uptown New Orleans, Louisiana; Richmond, California, U.S.
- Genres: Hip-hop; gangsta rap; Southern hip-hop
- Years active: 1989–2005
- Labels: In-A-Minute, No Limit, Priority, Koch
- Past members: Master P C-Murder; Silk; Big Ed (deceased); Calli-G; Chilee Powdah; King George; Milk Man; Mercedes

TRU (an abbreviation of The Real Untouchables) was an American hip hop group, with members from New Orleans, Louisiana and Richmond, California, active from 1989 to 2005. Between 1992 and 1997 the band dwindled from a dozen members to just the main three brothers and rappers Master P, C-Murder, and Silkk the Shocker.

The group released six albums, incorporating the typical No Limit formula of G-funk rhythms married to hardcore gangsta lyrics.

== History ==
Orginal members Master P, his brothers C-Murder and Silk, his wife Sonya C, King George, Fonzo, Calli G, Markest Banks, Daniel Fry, Big Ed, Daria Kelly, Ea-Ski and CMT were credited as The Real Untouchables when Understanding the Criminal Mind was released in 1992. When Who's Da Killer? was released in 1993 only King George, Calli G, Big Ed, and the brothers remained, joined by Milkman to form TRU. Milkman was gone again when True was released in 1995, and only the brothers were left when Tru 2 da Game was released in 1997.

The trio released Da Crime Family in 1999. C-Murder, imprisoned for life in 2003 after murdering a teenage fan, was replaced by Halleluyah on The Truth (2005), the group's final release.

=== Former members ===
- Master P (1989–2005)
- C-Murder (incarcerated) (1989–2005)
- Silkk the Shocker (1989–2005)
- Big Ed (deceased) (1992–1995)
- Cali-G (1989–1995)
- Chilee Powdah (1989–1993)
- King George (1989–1995)
- Milk Man (1989–1994)
- Halleluyah (2005)

== Discography ==
Studio albums

- Understanding the Criminal Mind (1992)
- Who's da Killer? (1993)
- True (1995)
- Tru 2 da Game (1997)
- Da Crime Family (1999)
- The Truth (2005)

== Filmography ==
- 1997: I'm Bout It
- 1998: I Got the Hook-Up
- 1998: MP da Last Don
- 1999: Hot Boyz
