= Fiend (rapper) =

American rapper

- Also known as: International Jones, Sleepy Jones
- Born: Richard Anthony Jones; May 13, 1976 (age 50); Hollygrove, New Orleans, Louisiana, U.S.
- Genre: Southern hip-hop
- Occupations: Rapper; songwriter; record producer
- Years active: 1994–present
- Labels: Fiend; Jet Life; No Limit; Priority; Ruff Ryders; Interscope

Richard Anthony Jones (born May 13, 1976), better known by his stage name Fiend (or International Jones), is an American rapper from New Orleans, Louisiana. His debut album, I Won't Be Denied (1995), was released by the local record label Big Boy Records. He signed with its competitor, Master P's No Limit Records, to release the follow-up album, There's One in Every Family (1998). The latter peaked within the top ten of the Billboard 200 and was followed by his third album, Street Life (1999), which peaked at number 15 on the chart and served as his final release with No Limit.

He briefly joined Ruff Ryders Entertainment in 2001 prior to forming the hip hop group, Da Headbussaz with Three 6 Mafia's Juicy J and DJ Paul, whose only album, Dat's How It Happen to'M (2002), entered the Billboard 200. He then signed with fellow New Orleans rapper Currensy's record label Jet Life Recordings in 2011, and released a collaborative album with the label, Jet World Order (2011).

== Early life ==
Richard Anthony Jones was born and raised in the Hollygrove neighborhood in the 17th ward of Uptown New Orleans.

== Music career ==
=== 1995: I Won't Be Denied ===
On November 14, 1995, Fiend released his first album, titled I Won't Be Denied, via independent label Big Boy Records.

=== 1997–98: No Limit Records and There's One in Every Family ===
In 1997 Fiend signed to Master P's record label No Limit Records and he appeared on Master P's Ghetto D and Mia X's Unlady Like before releasing his second album and first for No Limit, There's One in Every Family, in 1998. The album peaked at No. 8 on the Billboard 200 and number 1 on the Top R&B/Hip-Hop Albums charts. Also in that year, Fiend appeared on Snoop Dogg's single "Woof". There Is One In Every Family was certified Gold by the RIAA on June 15, 1998.

=== 1999: Street Life ===
In 1999, Fiend released his third album, Street Life. The album peaked at no. 15 on the Billboard 200 and no. 1 on the Top R&B/Hip-Hop Albums chart. In 1998 he married Carly Liber who is also known as Fiend; they did a duet together called "Fiend for the D".

=== 2000–02: Fiend Entertainment, Ruff Ryders, Da Headbusaz and Can I Burn? ===
In the early 2000s Fiend disbanded from No Limit Records and started his own label titled Fiend Entertainment. On August 22, 2000, Fiend released his third album and first independent album titled Can I Burn?; it charted at No. 52 on the Top R&B/Hip-Hop Albums charts. In 2000 Fiend became a signed artist at Ruff Ryders Entertainment and appeared on the label's third compilation album, Ryde or Die Vol. 3: In the "R" We Trust, before leaving in 2001. In 2000, Fiend and former No Limit label mate Mr. Serv-On collaborated on Three 6 Mafia's song "Touched Wit It", which led Three 6 Mafia members DJ Paul and Juicy J to do a group album with Fiend to form a new group titled Da Headbusaz;the album is titled Dat's How It Happen to'M.

=== 2003–06: Can I Burn? 2, Go Hard or Go Home and The Addiction: Hope Is Near ===
After the album, Fiend started his own label, Fiend Entertainment, and released three more albums. On May 13, 2003, Fiend released his fourth album and second independent album titled Can I Burn? 2; it charted at No. 55 on the Top R&B/Hip-Hop Albums charts. On August 31, 2004, Fiend released his fifth album and third independent album titled Go Hard or Go Home, which charted at No. 55 on the Top R&B/Hip-Hop Albums charts. On June 27, 2006, Fiend released his sixth album and fourth independent album titled The Addiction: Hope Is Near; it charted at No. 70 on the Top R&B/Hip-Hop Albums charts.

=== 2011–present: Jet Life Recordings, Street Aint Safe, Vol. 3 and Heart of a Ghetto Boy: Volume 1 ===
On May 24, 2011, during an interview Fiend announced that he had signed to fellow New Orleans, Louisiana rapper Currensy's record label Jet Life Recordings. Fiend also joined Currensy's new group Jet Life and announced that he had completed a sequel to the album There's One in Every Family, titled There’s One in Every Family Pt. II.

On July 10, 2015, Fiend released his eighth album, titled Street Aint Safe, Vol. 3, via Fiend Entertainment, Rapbay, Urbanlife Distribution. On August 21, 2015, Fiend released his ninth album and fifth independent album titled Heart of a Ghetto Boy: Volume 1 independently via Fiend Entertainment.

== Other ventures ==
=== Record production ===
Fiend also produces music, having done production for songs on Jadakiss' Kiss tha Game Goodbye and former labelmate C-Murder's The Truest Shit I Ever Said.

== Discography ==
- I Won't Be Denied (1995)
- There's One in Every Family (1998)
- Street Life (1999)
- Can I Burn? (2000)
- Can I Burn? 2 (2003)
- Go Hard or Go Home (2004)
- The Addiction: Hope Is Near (2006)

== See also ==
- No Limit Records
- No Limit Records discography
- Beats by the Pound
