= Silkk the Shocker discography =

Silkk The Shocker discography
- Studio albums: 5
- Soundtrack albums: 2
- Compilation albums: 8
- Singles: 9
- Music videos: 9
- Mixtapes: 1

American rapper Silkk The Shocker has released five studio albums, eight compilation albums, two soundtrack album, one mixtape, nine singles, and eight music videos. His music has been released on Priority Records, Koch Records & EMI along with his former record label's No Limit Records, The New No Limit, Guttar Music & his current label No Limit Forever.

== Albums ==
=== Studio albums ===
List of studio albums, with selected chart positions and certifications
| Title | Album details | Peak chart positions | | Certifications |
| Title | Album details | US | US R&B | Certifications |
|---|---|---|---|---|
| The Shocker | Released: August 20, 1996 (US); Label: No Limit / Priority; Format: CD, cassette, digital download, LP | 49 | 6 | |
| Charge It 2 da Game | Released: February 17, 1998 (US); Label: No Limit / Priority; Format: CD, cassette, digital download, LP | 3 | 1 | RIAA: Platinum |
| Made Man | Released: January 19, 1999 (US); Label: No Limit / Priority / EMI; Format: CD, cassette, digital download, LP | 1 | 1 | RIAA: Platinum |
| My World, My Way | Released: February 27, 2001 (US); Label: No Limit / Priority; Format: CD, digital download, LP | 12 | 3 | |
| Based on a True Story | Released: September 7, 2004 (US); Label: The New No Limit / Koch; Format: CD, digital download, LP | 88 | 22 | |
| It Will All Make Sense Later | Released: July 17, 2018; Label: No Limit Forever, Shocker World, XLP Distribution; Formats: CD, LP, digital download | | | |

=== Soundtrack albums ===
List of soundtrack albums, with selected chart positions and certifications
| Title | Album details | Peak chart positions | | Certifications |
| Title | Album details | US | US R&B | Certifications |
|---|---|---|---|---|
| I'm Bout It (with Various artists) | Released: May 13, 1997; Label: No Limit/Priority; Formats: CD, MD, LP | 4 | 1 | RIAA: Gold |
| I Got the Hook Up (with Various artists) | Released: April 7, 1998 (US); Label: No Limit/Priority; Format: CD, MD, LP | 3 | 1 | RIAA: Platinum |

=== Mixtapes ===
Silkk The Shocker's mixtapes and details
| Title | Mixtape details |
|---|---|
| All I Do Is Win Vol. 1 | Released: August 21, 2010; Self-released |

=== Compilation albums ===
List of compilation albums, with selected chart positions and certifications
| Title | Album details | Peak chart positions | | Certifications |
| Title | Album details | US | US R&B | Certifications |
|---|---|---|---|---|
| Down South Hustlers: Bouncin' and Swingin' (with Various Artists) | Released: October 31, 1995; Label: No Limit/Priority; Formats: CD, LP | 139 | 13 | |
| West Coast Bad Boyz II (with Various Artists as West Coast Bad Boyz) | Released: January 10, 1997; Label: No Limit/Priority; Formats: CD, LP | 17 | 6 | |
| Mean Green: Major Players Compilation (with Various Artists) | Released: September 28, 1998; Label: No Limit/Priority; Formats: CD, LP | 9 | 6 | RIAA: Gold |
| We Can't Be Stopped (with No Limit) | Released: September 28, 1998; Label: No Limit/Priority; Formats: CD, LP | 19 | 2 | |
| Straight Outta Compton: N.W.A 10th Anniversary Tribute (with Various Artists) | Released: November 3, 1998; Label: Priority; Formats: CD, LP | 142 | 31 | |
| Who U Wit? (with Various Artists) | Released: May 25, 1999; Label: No Limit/Priority; Formats: CD, LP | 62 | 22 | |
| West Coast Bad Boyz, Vol. 3: Poppin' Collars (with Various Artists) | Released: March 19, 2002; Label: No Limit/Priority; Formats: CD, LP | 108 | 28 | |
| The Best of Silkk the Shocker | Released: October 4, 2005; Label: Priority; Formats: CD, LP | — | — | |
| Gutta Music All-Stars (with Various Artists) | Released: May 15, 2007; Label: Guttar Music, UrbanDigital, GoDigital; Formats: CD, LP | — | — | |

== Singles ==
=== As lead artist ===
List of singles as lead artist, with selected chart positions and certifications, showing year released and album name
| Title | Year | Peak chart positions | | | Album |
| Title | Year | US | US R&B | US Rap | Album |
|---|---|---|---|---|---|
| "The Shocker" (featuring Master P) | 1996 | — | — | — | The Shocker |
| "Scream" (with Master P) | 1997 | — | — | — | Scream 2: Music from the Motion Picture |
| "Just Be Straight with Me" (featuring Master P and Destiny's Child) | 1998 | 57 | 36 | 12 | Charge It 2 da Game |
| "It Ain't My Fault" (featuring Mystikal) | 1998 | 18 | 5 | 1 | Charge It 2 da Game |
| "Give Me The World" | 1998 | — | — | — | Charge It 2 da Game |
| "Express Yourself" (featuring O'Dell) | 1998 | — | — | 43 | Straight Outta Compton: N.W.A 10th Anniversary Tribute |
| "Somebody Like Me" (featuring Mýa) | 1999 | — | 43 | 1 | Made Man |
| "Ghetto Rain" (featuring Master P & O'Dell) | 1999 | — | — | — | Made Man |
| "He Did That" (featuring Mac and Master P) | 2000 | — | 50 | 3 | My World, My Way |
| "That's Cool" (featuring Trina) | 2001 | — | 51 | 6 | My World, My Way |
| "Pop Lockin'" (featuring Snoop Dogg and Goldie Loc) | 2001 | — | 64 | — | My World, My Way |
| "We Soldiers" | 2002 | — | — | — | —N/a |
| "We Like Them Girls" (featuring Master P and Petey Pablo) | 2004 | — | 69 | 15 | Based on a True Story |
| "Holla At Yo Boy" | 2009 | — | — | — | —N/a |
| "Money Ain't the Problem" (featuring Prince Sole) | 2013 | — | — | — | —N/a |
| "Don't Give Up" | 2014 | — | — | — | Incredible |
| "We Ain't Even Trippin" | 2014 | — | — | — | Incredible |
| "Business" (featuring BlaqNmilD) | 2015 | — | — | — | Incredible |

=== As featured artist ===
List of singles as featured artist, with selected chart positions and certifications, showing year released and album name
| Title | Year | Peak chart positions | | | Certifications | Album |
| Title | Year | US | US R&B | US Rap | Certifications | Album |
|---|---|---|---|---|---|---|
| "The Ghetto's Tryin' to Kill Me!" (Master P featuring Silkk the Shocker) | 1994 | — | — | — | | The Ghettos Tryin to Kill Me! |
| "Mr. Ice Cream Man" (Master P featuring Silkk the Shocker) | 1996 | 90 | 55 | 12 | | Ice Cream Man |
| "No More Tears" (Master P featuring Silkk the Shocker and Mo B. Dick) | 1996 | — | 78 | 15 | | Ice Cream Man |
| "I Miss My Homies" (Master P featuring Pimp C and Silkk the Shocker) | 1997 | 25 | 16 | 1 | RIAA: Gold | Ghetto D |
| "Ain't No Limit" (Mystikal featuring Silkk the Shocker) | 1997 | — | 63 | — | | Unpredictable |
| "Make 'Em Say Uhh!" (Master P featuring Silkk the Shocker, Mia X, Fiend and Mystikal) | 1998 | 16 | 18 | 6 | RIAA: Platinum | Ghetto D |
| "Let's Ride" (Montell Jordan featuring Master P and Silkk the Shocker) | 1998 | 2 | 1 | — | RIAA: Platinum | Let's Ride |
| "A 2nd Chance" (C-Murder featuring Mo B. Dick, Master P & Silkk the Shocker) | 1998 | — | — | — | | Life or Death |
| "Take My Pain" (Fiend featuring Master P, Silkk The Shocker and Sons of Funk) | 1998 | — | 11 | — | | There's One in Every Family |
| "Ghetto Fame" (Lil Italy featuring Silkk The Shocker) | 1998 | — | — | — | | On Top of da World |
| "Street Life" (Soulja Slim featuring Master P, Silkk The Shocker and O'Dell) | 1998 | — | 17 | — | | Give It 2 'Em Raw |
| "Movin' On" (Mýa featuring Silkk The Shocker) | 1998 | 34 | 4 | — | | Mýa |
| "Pure Uncut" (8Ball featuring Silkk the Shocker, Psycho Drama, Master P and Mystikal) | 1998 | — | — | — | | Lost |
| "Rodeo" (Big Ed featuring Silkk the Shocker and Mia X) | 1998 | — | — | — | | The Assassin |
| "Goodbye to My Homies" (Master P featuring Mo B. Dick, Sons of Funk and Silkk the Shocker) | 1999 | 27 | 38 | 5 | | MP da Last Don |
| "Live or Die" (Naughty by Nature featuring Master P, Mystikal, Silkk the Shocker and Phiness) | 1999 | — | 86 | — | | Nineteen Naughty Nine: Nature's Fury |
| "Bout Dat" (Master P featuring Silkk the Shocker) | 2000 | — | 46 | — | | Ghetto Postage |
| "What U Gonna Do" (C-Murder featuring Ms. Peaches and Silkk The Shocker) | 2001 | — | — | — | | C-P-3.com |
| "2-Way" (Lil' Romeo featuring Master P & Silkk the Shocker) | 2002 | — | 38 | — | | Game Time |
| "Bent" (Maserati Rome featuring Ace B & Silkk the Shocker) | 2015 | — | — | — | | Fighting Monsters |
