= Mystikal discography =

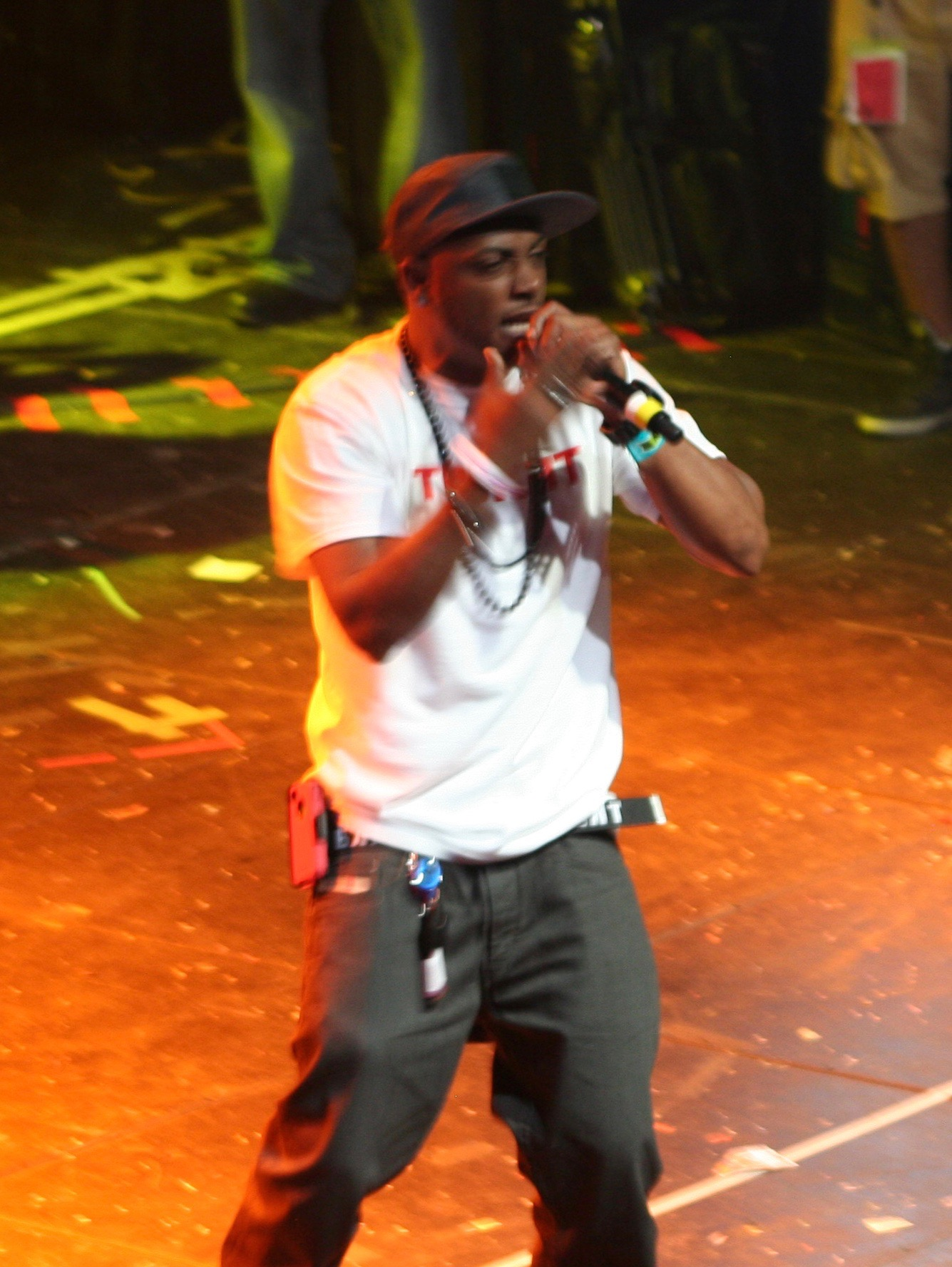
- Mystikal performing in 2012
- Studio albums: 5
- Compilation albums: 2
- Singles: 25
- Music videos: 15

The discography of American rapper Mystikal consists of six studio albums (including one independent album), two compilation albums, twenty-five singles and fifteen music videos. In 1994, Mystikal released a self-titled album on the independent record label Big Boy Records. Following his signing to Jive Records in 1995, the album was re-released under the title Mind of Mystikal as his debut studio album. Mind of Mystikal peaked at number 103 on the US Billboard 200 and at number 13 on the US Top R&B/Hip-Hop Albums chart. The album featured the single "Y'all Ain't Ready Yet", which peaked at number 41 on the US Hot R&B/Hip-Hop Songs chart. Mystikal's following two studio albums, Unpredictable and Ghetto Fabulous, were both released on the record label No Limit Records; Jive distributed the albums rather than No Limit's distributor, Priority Records. Both peaked in the top five of the Billboard 200 and were later certified platinum by the Recording Industry Association of America (RIAA). Each of the albums featured one single, "Ain't No Limit" and "That's the Nigga", respectively. Both songs peaked in the top 65 of the Hot R&B/Hip-Hop Songs chart.

Following his departure from No Limit, Mystikal released his fourth album, Let's Get Ready, on September 26, 2000. The album became his most commercially successful release in the United States, peaking at number one on the Billboard 200, also charting in the Canada, Germany and the United Kingdom. It was later certified double platinum by the RIAA. Let's Get Ready spawned two singles, "Shake Ya Ass" and "Danger (Been So Long)" with singer Nivea, which both charted within the top 15 in the United States and also achieved success in several other countries. In 2001, Mystikal collaborated with singer Joe on the single "Stutter", which became Mystikal's first and only song to top the Billboard Hot 100, and also appeared on several national singles charts worldwide. Mystikal's fifth album, Tarantula, featured the singles "Bouncin' Back (Bumpin' Me Against the Wall)" and "Tarantula" – the latter a collaboration with rapper Butch Cassidy. "Bouncin' Back (Bumpin' Me Against the Wall)" became Mystikal's third and final song to appear on the Billboard Hot 100. It peaked at number 37 and also charted in the United Kingdom.

While Mystikal served a prison term in 2004 for sexual battery, Jive released two compilations of Mystikal's music, Prince of the South... The Hits and Chopped & Screwed, although neither appeared in the top 100 on the Billboard 200. Following his release from prison in 2010, Mystikal released the single "Original" in 2011, which features fellow rappers Birdman and Lil Wayne; the song peaked at number 80 on the Hot R&B/Hip-Hop Songs chart.

== Albums ==
=== Studio albums ===
List of studio albums, with selected chart positions, sales figures and certifications
| Title | Album details | Peak chart positions | | | | | Sales | Certifications |
| Title | Album details | US | US R&B | CAN | GER | UK | Sales | Certifications |
|---|---|---|---|---|---|---|---|---|
| Mind of Mystikal | Released: October 10, 1995 (US); Label: Jive; Format: CD, digital download, LP, compact cassette | 103 | 13 | — | — | — | | RIAA: Gold |
| Unpredictable | Released: November 11, 1997 (US); Label: No Limit, Jive; Format: CD, digital download, LP, compact cassette | 3 | 1 | — | — | — | | RIAA: Platinum |
| Ghetto Fabulous | Released: December 15, 1998 (US); Label: No Limit, Jive; Format: CD, digital download, LP, compact cassette | 5 | 1 | — | — | — | | RIAA: Platinum |
| Let's Get Ready | Released: September 26, 2000 (US); Label: Jive; Format: CD, digital download, LP, compact cassette | 1 | 1 | 37 | 94 | 91 | US: 2,200,000 | RIAA: 2× Platinum; MC: Gold |
| Tarantula | Released: December 18, 2001 (US); Label: Jive; Format: CD, digital download, LP, compact cassette | 25 | 4 | — | — | — | | RIAA: Gold |
"—" denotes a recording that did not chart or was not released in that territory.

==== Independent albums ====
List of independent studio albums, with some notes
| Title | Album details |
|---|---|
| Mystikal | Released: June 14, 1994 (US); Label: Big Boy; Format: CD, digital download, LP, compact cassette |

=== Compilation albums ===
List of compilation albums, with selected chart positions
| Title | Album details | Peak chart positions | |
| Title | Album details | US | US R&B |
|---|---|---|---|
| Prince of the South... The Hits | Released: August 10, 2004 (US); Label: Jive; Format: CD, digital download, LP, compact cassette | 140 | 27 |
| Chopped & Screwed | Released: December 7, 2004 (US); Label: Jive; Format: CD, digital download, LP, compact cassette | — | — |
"—" denotes a recording that did not chart.

== Singles ==
=== As lead artist ===
List of singles, with selected chart positions, showing year released and album name
| Title | Year | Peak chart positions | | | | | | | | | Album |
| Title | Year | US | US R&B | US Rap | AUS | GER | NL | SWE | SWI | UK | Album |
|---|---|---|---|---|---|---|---|---|---|---|---|
| "Y'all Ain't Ready Yet" | 1995 | —^{[A]} | 41 | 12 | — | — | — | — | — | — | Mind of Mystikal |
| "Ain't No Limit" (featuring Silkk the Shocker) | 1997 | — | 63 | — | — | — | — | — | — | — | Unpredictable |
| "That's the Nigga" | 1999 | — | 60 | — | — | — | — | — | — | — | Mean Green/ Ghetto Fabulous |
| "Neck uv da Woods" (featuring OutKast) | 1999 | — | 73 | — | — | — | — | — | — | — | The Wood (soundtrack) / Let's Get Ready |
| "Shake Ya Ass" | 2000 | 13 | 3 | 7 | 62 | 87 | 66 | — | — | 30 | Let's Get Ready |
| "Danger (Been So Long)" (featuring Nivea) | 2000 | 14 | 1 | 3 | — | 45 | 36 | 40 | 60 | 28 | Let's Get Ready |
| "Bouncin' Back (Bumpin' Me Against the Wall)" | 2001 | 37 | 8 | 7 | — | — | — | — | — | 45 | Tarantula |
| "Tarantula" (featuring Butch Cassidy) | 2002 | — | 76 | — | — | — | — | — | — | — | Tarantula |
| "Oochie Pop" | 2004 | — | 83 | — | — | — | — | — | — | — | Prince of the South... The Hits |
| "Papercuts" (featuring Lil Wayne and Fiend) | 2010 | — | — | — | — | — | — | — | — | — | Non-album single |
| "Original" (featuring Birdman and Lil Wayne) | 2011 | — | 80 | — | — | — | — | — | — | — | Non-album single |
"—" denotes a recording that did not chart or was not released in that territory.

=== As featured artist ===
List of singles, with selected chart positions and certifications, showing year released and album name
| Title | Year | Peak chart positions | | | | | | | | | | Certifications | Album |
| Title | Year | US | US R&B | US Rap | AUS | GER | NL | NZ | SWE | SWI | UK | Certifications | Album |
|---|---|---|---|---|---|---|---|---|---|---|---|---|---|
| "How We Comin'" (RBL Posse featuring Mystikal and Big Lurch) | 1997 | —^{[B]} | 90 | 22 | — | — | — | — | — | — | — | | An Eye for an Eye |
| "Make 'Em Say Uhh!" (Master P featuring Mystikal, Silkk the Shocker, Mia X and Fiend) | 1998 | 16 | 18 | 6 | — | — | — | — | — | — | — | RIAA: Platinum | Ghetto D |
| "`It Ain't My Fault" (Silkk the Shocker featuring Mystikal) | 1998 | 18 | 5 | 1 | — | — | — | — | — | — | — | | Charge It 2 da Game |
| "I'm a Soulja" (Ghetto Commission featuring Mystikal and Master P) | 1998 | — | — | — | — | — | — | — | — | — | — | | Wise Guys |
| "Pure Uncut" (8Ball featuring Mystikal, Silkk the Shocker, Psycho Drama, Master P) | 1998 | — | — | — | — | — | — | — | — | — | — | | Lost |
| "Live or Die" (Naughty by Nature featuring Mystikal, Master P, Silkk the Shocker and Phinesse) | 1999 | — | 86 | — | — | — | — | — | — | — | — | | Nineteen Naughty Nine: Nature's Fury |
| "It Ain't My Fault 2" (Silkk the Shocker featuring Mystikal) | 1999 | — | — | — | — | — | — | — | — | — | — | | Made Man |
| "Woof" (Snoop Dogg featuring Mystikal and Fiend) | 1999 | 62 | 31 | 3 | — | — | — | — | — | — | — | | Da Game Is to Be Sold, Not to Be Told |
| "Stutter" (Joe featuring Mystikal) | 2001 | 1 | 1 | — | 19 | 12 | 18 | 42 | 44 | 14 | 7 | RIAA: Gold | My Name Is Joe |
| "Don't Stop (Funkin' 4 Jamaica)" (Mariah Carey featuring Mystikal) | 2001 | —^{[C]} | 42 | — | 36 | — | 65 | — | — | 67 | 32 | | Glitter |
| "Wizzy Wow" (Blackstreet featuring Mystikal) | 2002 | — | —^{[D]} | — | — | — | — | — | — | — | 37 | | Level II |
| "Move Bitch" (Ludacris featuring Mystikal and I-20) | 2002 | 10 | 3 | 3 | — | — | — | — | — | — | — | | Word of Mouf |
| "I Don't Give a Fuck" (Lil Jon & The East Side Boyz featuring Mystikal and Krayzie Bone) | 2002 | — | 50 | — | — | 68 | — | — | — | — | — | | Kings of Crunk |
| "Keep Doin' It" (Violator featuring Mystikal, Dirtbag and Busta Rhymes) | 2004 | — | 92 | — | — | — | — | — | — | — | — | | Non-album singles |
| "Set Me Free" (Lloyd featuring Mystikal) | 2010 | — | 87 | — | — | — | — | — | — | — | — | | Non-album singles |
| "Fly Rich" (Rich Gang featuring Stevie J, Future, Tyga, Meek Mill and Mystikal) | 2013 | — | —^{[E]} | — | — | — | — | — | — | — | — | | Rich Gang: Flashy Lifestyle |
| "Feel Right" (Mark Ronson featuring Mystikal) | 2015 | — | — | — | — | — | — | — | — | — | — | | Uptown Special |
| "Just a Lil' Thick (She Juicy)" (Trinidad James featuring Mystikal and Lil Dicky) | 2016 | — | 52 | — | — | — | — | — | — | — | — | RIAA: Gold | Non-album single |
"—" denotes a recording that did not chart or was not released in that territory.

=== Promotional singles ===
List of singles, showing year released and album name
| Title | Year | Album |
|---|---|---|
| "Wild Boy" (Remix) (MGK featuring 2 Chainz, French Montana, Meek Mill, Mystikal, Steve-O and Yo Gotti) | 2012 | Non-album single |

== Other charted songs ==
List of songs, with selected chart positions, showing year released and album name
| Title | Year | Peak chart positions | Album |
| Title | Year | US R&B | Album |
|---|---|---|---|
| "Hot Boys and Girls" (Master P featuring Mystikal, Mia X, Silkk the Shocker and Kane & Abel) | 1999 | 87 | MP da Last Don |
| "If It Ain't Live, It Ain't Me" | 2002 | —^{[F]} | Tarantula |

== Guest appearances ==
List of non-single guest appearances, with other performing artists, showing year released and album name
| Title | Year | Other performer(s) | Album |
|---|---|---|---|
| "Dirty South" (Remix) | 1995 | Goodie Mob | —N/a |
| "Mr. Shit Talker" | 1997 | —N/a | Dangerous Ground soundtrack |
| "Southern Comfort (On & On)" | 1997 | Big Mike | Still Serious |
| "It's On" | 1997 | Steady Mobb'n, Master P, Fiend | Pre-Meditated Drama |
| "What Cha Think" | 1997 | —N/a | I'm Bout It (soundtrack) |
| "You Don't Wanna Go 2 War" | 1997 | Mia X, TRU | Unlady Like |
| "Who Got tha Clout" | 1997 | Mia X | Unlady Like |
| "Get Cha Mind Right" | 1997 | —N/a | Southwest Riders |
| "Hustlin'" | 1997 | Mr. Serv-On, Master P | Life Insurance |
| "Let's Get 'Em" | 1997 | Master P, Silkk the Shocker | Ghetto D |
| "Captain Kirk" | 1997 | Master P, Fiend, Silkk the Shocker | Ghetto D |
| "Bring the Noise" | 1998 | Young Bleed, Master P | My Balls and My Word |
| "I'm a Soldier" | 1998 | Silkk the Shocker, Master P, C-Murder, Fiend, Mac, Skull Duggery, Big Ed, Mia X | Charge It 2 da Game |
| "How Many Niggas?" | 1998 | Silkk the Shocker, C-Murder, Master P, Mia X | Charge It 2 da Game |
| "Don't Play No Games" | 1998 | C-Murder, Silkk the Shocker | Life or Death |
| "Soldiers" | 1998 | C-Murder, Master P, Silkk the Shocker, Fiend, Mac, Mia X, Big Ed, Kane & Abel | Life or Death |
| "Shake Somethin'" | 1998 | Mia X | I Got the Hook Up (soundtrack) |
| "Who Rock This" | 1998 | Ol' Dirty Bastard | I Got the Hook Up (soundtrack) |
| "Do You Know" | 1998 | Fiend, Master P | There's One in Every Family |
| "Get High with Me" | 1998 | Soulja Slim, Tre-Nitty | Give It 2 'Em Raw |
| "Soldiers, Riders & G's" | 1998 | Master P, Silkk the Shocker, Snoop Dogg | MP da Last Don |
| "War Wounds" | 1998 | Master P, Silkk the Shocker, Snoop Dogg, Fiend | MP da Last Don |
| "Hot Boys and Girls" | 1998 | Master P, Silkk the Shocker, Mia X, Kane & Abel | MP da Last Don |
| "Watch Me" | 1998 | Kane & Abel, Silkk the Shocker, Soulja Slim | Am I My Brother's Keeper |
| "Let's Go Get 'Em" | 1998 | Kane & Abel, Soulja Slim, Mac, Big Ed, Fiend, Mia X | Am I My Brother's Keeper |
| "Murda, Murda, Kill, Kill" | 1998 | Mac | Shell Shocked |
| "Tru Tank Doggs" | 1998 | Snoop Dogg | Da Game Is to Be Sold, Not to Be Told |
| "See Ya When I Get There" | 1998 | Snoop Dogg, C-Murder | Da Game Is to Be Sold, Not to Be Told |
| "My Entourage" | 1998 | Big Ed, Silkk the Shocker | The Assassin |
| "Go 2 War" | 1998 | Big Ed, Full Blooded | The Assassin |
| "Uh Oh" | 1998 | Big Ed, Fiend | The Assassin |
| "Satisfied" | 1998 | Skull Duggery | These Wicked Streets |
| "Did What I Had 2" | 1998 | Magic | Sky's the Limit |
| "Made Niggaz" | 1998 | Mack 10, Master P | The Recipe |
| "Liquidation of the Ghetto" | 1998 | Prime Suspects | Guilty 'til Proven Innocent |
| "Only G's Ride" | 1998 | Gambino Family, Mo B. Dick | Ghetto Organized |
| "Bring It On" | 1998 | Mia X, Fiend, C-Murder | Mama Drama |
| "Puttin' It Down" | 1998 | Mia X, Fiend, Mac | Mama Drama |
| "The Edge of the Blade" | 1998 | —N/a | Blade (soundtrack) |
| "Niggas Like Me" | 1998 | Steady Mobb'n, Silkk the Shocker | Black Mafia |
| "I Ain't Playin'" | 1998 | —N/a | We Can't Be Stopped / The Corruptor (soundtrack) |
| "Iz They Wildin Wit Us & Gettin' Rowdy Wit Us?" | 1998 | Busta Rhymes | E.L.E. (Extinction Level Event): The Final World Front |
| "Boot 'Em Up" | 1999 | Mr. Serv-On, Fiend | Da Next Level |
| "Runnin' from the Police" | 1999 | C-Murder | Foolish (soundtrack) |
| "That's That Shit" | 1999 | —N/a | Foolish (soundtrack) |
| "Ghetto Symphony" | 1999 | Snoop Dogg, Mia X, Fiend, C-Murder, Silkk the Shocker, Goldie Loc | No Limit Top Dogg |
| "Hush" | 1999 | Mercedes, Peaches | Rear End |
| "Ak'n Bad" | 1999 | Fiend, Skull Duggery | Street Life |
| "We Ain't Hard 2 Find" | 1999 | Lil Italy, Snoop Dogg | On Top of da World |
| "Y'all Don't Want None" | 1999 | Master P | Only God Can Judge Me |
| "Did I Do That?" | 1999 | Mariah Carey, Master P | Rainbow |
| "Jump" | 2000 | —N/a | Any Given Sunday (soundtrack) / Let's Get Ready |
| "Wobble Wobble" | 2000 | 504 Boyz, TRU | Goodfellas |
| "Tryin' to Stop Smokin'" | 2000 | Trick Daddy | Book of Thugs: Chapter AK Verse 47 |
| "Hands in the Air" | 2000 | Da Brat | Unrestricted |
| "Clown wit It" | 2000 | E-40 | Loyalty and Betrayal |
| "What You Bout" | 2000 | C-Murder | Trapped in Crime |
| "Game (Triple H Theme)" | 2000 | Ras Kass | WWF Aggression |
| "Show Dat Work (Shake It Like a Dog Pt. 2)" | 2000 | Kane & Abel | Most Wanted |
| "Them Boyz" | 2001 | Silkk the Shocker | My World, My Way |
| "Bout My Paper" | 2001 | Foxy Brown | Broken Silence |
| "Get Started" | 2002 | Roy Jones Jr. | Round One |
| Gettin' Aggressive (Mowo! Mix)" | 2002 | Moby | Blade II (soundtrack) |
| "Don't Mess with My Man (Remix)" | 2002 | Nivea | Nivea |
| "Too Much Room" | 2002 | Gerald Levert | The G Spot |
| "Ride wit Me" | 2009 | Mack Maine, Soulja Slim | This Is Just a Mixtape |
| "Get Away" | 2011 | Yelawolf, Shawty Fatt | Radioactive |
| "Move Fast" | 2012 | Galactic, Mannie Fresh | Carnivale Electricos |
| "New Orleans" | 2012 | Gudda Gudda, Thugga, Flow | Guddaville 3 |
| "Money Mayweather" | 2012 | GMouse | Millionaire Dreamzzz |
| "I'm on It" | 2012 | Mack Maine, Turk | Freestyle 102: No Pens or Pads |
| "P.A.M." | 2013 | Big Chief | Fuck Yo Feeling Vol. 2 |
| "Mamma Cry" | 2013 | —N/a | Rich Gang: All Stars |
| "Here I Go" | 2013 | T.I., Young Dro, Spodee, Shad da God | G.D.O.D. |
| "R.G." | 2013 | —N/a | Rich Gang |
| "Everyday" | 2013 | Cory Gunz, Birdman, Busta Rhymes | Rich Gang |
| "Angel" | 2013 | Birdman, Ace Hood, Jae Millz, Gudda Gudda, Mack Maine | Rich Gang |
| "Rain Dance" | 2015 | Stevie Stone, Tech N9ne | Malta Bend |
| "F Y M" | 2017 | Joyner Lucas | (508)-507-2209 |

== Music videos ==
List of music videos, with directors, showing year released
| Title | Year | Director(s) |
|---|---|---|
| "Y'all Ain't Ready Yet" | 1995 | Will Horton |
| "Here I Go" | 1995 | Will Horton |
| "Out That Boot Camp Clicc" | 1995 | Rubin Whitmore III |
| "Beware" | 1996 | Anibal Suarez |
| "Ain't No Limit" (featuring Silkk the Shocker) | 1997 | Michael Martin |
| "Neck uv da Woods" (featuring Outkast) | 1999 | Little X |
| "Shake Ya Ass" (featuring Pharrell) | 2000 | Little X |
| "Danger (Been So Long)" (featuring Nivea) | 2000 | Little X |
| "Bouncin' Back (Bumpin' Me Against the Wall)" | 2001 | Jessy Terrero, Chris Robinson |
| "Tarantula" (featuring Butch Cassidy) | 2002 | Jessy Terrero |
| "Original" (featuring Birdman and Lil Wayne) | 2012 | Gil Green |
| "One Night" (featuring Birdman, Jae Millz and Detail) | 2012 | Derick G |

=== As featured performer ===
List of music videos, with directors, showing year released
| Title | Year | Director(s) |
|---|---|---|
| "How We Comin'" (RBL Posse featuring Mystikal and Big Lurch) | 1997 | Dave Meyers |
| "Make 'Em Say Uhh!" (Master P featuring Mystikal, Silkk the Shocker, Mia X and Fiend) | 1998 | Michael Martin |
| "It Ain't My Fault" (Silkk the Shocker featuring Mystikal) | 1998 | Gerald Barclay |
| "I'm a Soulja" (Ghetto Commission featuring Mystikal & Master P) | 1998 | —N/a |
| "Pure Uncut" (8Ball featuring Mystikal, Silkk the Shocker, Psycho Drama, Master P) | 1998 | —N/a |
| "Live or Die" (Naughty by Nature featuring Mystikal, Master P, Silkk the Shocker and Phinesse) | 1999 | —N/a |
| "Woof" (Snoop Dogg featuring Mystikal and Fiend) | 1999 | —N/a |
| "It Ain't My Fault 2" (Silkk the Shocker featuring Mystikal) | 1999 | —N/a |
| "Stutter" (Joe featuring Mystikal) | 2001 | Terry Heller |
| "Don't Stop (Funkin' 4 Jamaica)" (Mariah Carey featuring Mystikal) | 2001 | Sanaa Hamri |
| "Move Bitch" (Ludacris featuring Mystikal and I-20) | 2002 | Erik White |
| "I Don't Give a Fuck" (Lil Jon & The East Side Boyz featuring Mystikal and Krayzie Bone) | 2002 | Gil Green |
| "Wizzy Wow" (Blackstreet featuring Mystikal) | 2002 | ULF |
| "Keep Doin' It" (Violator featuring Mystikal, Dirtbag and Busta Rhymes) | 2003 | Erik White |
| "Wild Boy" (Remix) (MGK featuring 2 Chainz, French Montana, Meek Mill, Mystikal, Steve-O and Yo Gotti) | 2012 | Fred Tovar, Scott Fleishman |

== See also ==
- 504 Boyz discography
- No Limit Records discography

== Notes ==
- A "Y'all Ain't Ready Yet" did not enter the Billboard Hot 100, but peaked at number 6 on the Bubbling Under Hot 100 Singles chart, which acts as an extension to the Hot 100.
- B "How We Comin'" did not enter the Billboard Hot 100, but peaked at number 22 on the Bubbling Under Hot 100 Singles chart, which acts as an extension to the Hot 100.
- C "Don't Stop (Funkin' 4 Jamaica)" did not enter the Billboard Hot 100, but peaked at number 23 on the Bubbling Under Hot 100 Singles chart, which acts as an extension to the Hot 100.
- D "Wizzy Wow" did not enter the Hot R&B/Hip-Hop Songs chart, but peaked at number 8 on the Bubbling Under R&B/Hip-Hop Singles chart, which acts as an extension to the Hot R&B/Hip-Hop Songs chart.
- E "Fly Rich" did not enter the Hot R&B/Hip-Hop Songs chart, but peaked at number 10 on the Bubbling Under R&B/Hip-Hop Singles chart, which acts as an extension to the Hot R&B/Hip-Hop Songs chart.
- F "If It Ain't Live, It Ain't Me" did not enter the Hot R&B/Hip-Hop Songs chart, but peaked at number 4 on the Bubbling Under R&B/Hip-Hop Singles chart, which acts as an extension to the Hot R&B/Hip-Hop Songs chart.
