= Mia X discography =

This is the discography for American hip hop musician Mia X.

== Albums ==
=== Studio albums ===
List of studio albums, with selected chart positions
Title	Album details	Peak chart positions		Certifications
Title	Album details	US	US R&B	Certifications
Good Girl Gone Bad	Released: November 21, 1995; Label: No Limit, Priority; Format: CD, Cassette, MD, LP	–	–	
Unlady Like	Released: June 24, 1997; Label: No Limit, Priority; Format: CD, cassette, digital download, LP	21	2	RIAA: Gold
Mama Drama	Released: October 27, 1998; Label: No Limit, Priority, EMI; Format: CD, cassette, digital download, LP	7	3	

=== Extended plays ===
List of albums, with selected chart positions
Title	Album details	Peak chart positions	
Title	Album details	US	US R&B
Da Payback	Released: 1993; Label: Lamina Records/ Rap Dis Records; Format: CD, Cassette, MD, EP	—	—

=== Mixtapes ===
Mia X's mixtapes and details
Title	Mixtape details
Unladylike Forever	Released: 2010; Label: Mama Mia Muzic

=== Soundtrack albums ===
List of soundtrack albums, with selected chart positions and certifications
Title	Album details	Peak chart positions		Certifications
Title	Album details	US	US R&B	Certifications
I'm Bout It (with Various artists)	Released: May 13, 1997; Label: No Limit, Priority; Formats: CD, MD, LP	4	1	RIAA: Platinum
I Got the Hook Up (with Various artists)	Released: April 7, 1998; Label: No Limit, Priority; Format: CD, MD, LP	3	1	RIAA: Platinum
Foolish (with Various artists)	Released: March 23, 1999; Label: No Limit, Priority; Formats: CD, MD, LP	32	10	RIAA: Gold

=== Compilation albums ===
List of compilation albums, with selected chart positions and certifications
Title	Album details	Peak chart positions		Certifications
Title	Album details	US	US R&B	Certifications
Down South Hustlers: Bouncin' and Swingin' (with Various artist)	Released: October 31, 1995; Label: No Limit, Priority; Formats: CD, MD, LP	139	13	
Mean Green: Major Players Compilation (with Various artist)	Released: September 29, 1998; Label: No Limit, Priority; Formats: CD, MD, LP	9	6	RIAA: Gold
We Can't Be Stopped (with No Limit)	Released: December 8, 1998; Label: No Limit, Priority; Formats: CD, MD, LP	19	2	
Who U Wit? (with Various artist)	Released: May 25, 1999; Label: No Limit, Priority; Formats: CD, MD, LP	62	22	

== Singles ==
=== As lead artist ===
List of singles as lead artist, with selected chart positions and certifications, showing year released and album name
Title	Year	Peak chart positions			Album
Title	Year	US	US R&B	US Rap	Album
"I Wanna Be With You" (featuring Master P and Mr. Serv-On)	1996	—	—	—	
"The Party Don't Stop" (featuring Master P and Foxy Brown)^{[A]}	1997	—	38	—	Unlady Like
"What'cha Wanna Do?" (featuring Charlie Wilson)	1998	41	32	4	Mama Drama
"Imma Shine"	1998	—	—	—	Mama Drama
"Mr. Right" (featuring Ms. Tasha)	2014	—	—	—	
"No More" (featuring Caren Green)	2015	—	—	—	Betty Rocka Locksmith

- ^{A} Did not chart on the Hot 100 or Hot R&B/Hip-Hop charts (Billboard rules at the time prevented album cuts from charting). Chart peak listed here represents Hot 100 Airplay and Hot R&B/Hip-Hop Airplay charts data.

=== As featured artist ===
List of singles as featured artist, with selected chart positions and certifications, showing year released and album name
Title	Year	Peak chart positions			Certifications	Album
Title	Year	US	US R&B	US Rap	Certifications	Album
"I'm Bout' It, Bout It" (TRU featuring Mia X)	1997	—	—	—		True
"Rodeo" (Big Ed featuring Silkk the Shocker and Mia X)	1998	—	—	—		The Assassin
"Make 'Em Say Uhh!" (Master P featuring Silkk the Shocker, Mia X, Fiend and Mystikal)	1998	16	18	6	RIAA: Platinum	Ghetto D
"Slow Down" (Snoop Dogg featuring Mia X, O'Dell and Anita Thomas)	1998	—	—	—		Da Game Is to Be Sold, Not to Be Told
"Boss Chick" (Mac featuring Mia X)	1998	—	—	—		Shell Shocked
"No Pain, No Gain" (Ghetto Twiinz featuring Mia X)	1998	—	—	—		No Pain No Gain
"Thinkin' Bout U" (Master P featuring Mia X and Mo B. Dick)	1998	—	—	—		MP da Last Don
"Hot Boys and Girls" (Master P featuring Mystikal, Mia X, Silkk the Shocker and Kane & Abel)	1999	—	87	—		MP da Last Don
"Make 'Em Say Uhh! #2" (Master P featuring Fiend, Snoop Dogg, Mia X and Silkk The Shocker)	1999	19	13	—		MP da Last Don
"N's Ain't Shit" (Mercedes featuring Mia X)	1999	—	—	—		Rear End
"Make You Happy" (Cupid featuring Mia X)	2013	—	—	—		Positopia

=== Collaboration singles ===
List of collaboration singles, with selected chart positions, showing year released and album name
Title	Year	Peak chart positions			Album
Title	Year	US	US R&B	US Rap	Album
"If I Could Change" (with Steady Mobb'n, Master P, Mo B. Dick & O'Dell)	1997	48	23	7	I'm Bout It: Music from the Motion Picture
"Major Players" (with Master P, Silkk the Shocker, Porsha & Mean Green)	1998	—	—	—	Mean Green
