= The Best of Silkk the Shocker =

Compilation album by Silkk the Shocker
- Released: October 4, 2005
- Recorded: 1996–2001
- Genre: Southern hip hop, gangsta rap
- Label: Priority Records
- Producer: Donald XL Robertson, Frank Collura

Silkk the Shocker chronology
Based on a True Story (2004)	The Best of Silkk the Shocker (2005)

The Best of Silkk the Shocker is a compilation album released by Priority Records containing the greatest hits of rapper Silkk the Shocker. It was released on October 4, 2005. It was rated four stars by AllMusic.

== Track listing ==
1. "I'm a Soldier" — 5:08
2. "It Ain't My Fault" — 3:19
3. "He Did That" (featuring Mac) — 3:25
4. "You Ain't Gotta Lie to Kick It" — 5:04
5. "Let Me Hit It" (featuring Mystikal) — 2:41
6. "That's Cool" (featuring Trina) — 3:42
7. "I Represent" — 4:56
8. "How We Mobb" (featuring Master P) — 4:00
9. "It Ain't My Fault, Pt. 2" (featuring Mystikal) — 3:26
10. "Who Can I Trust" — 3:35
11. "Somebody Like Me" (featuring Mýa) — 4:13
12. "It's Time to Ride" (featuring Master P) — 3:05
13. "If I Don't Gotta" (featuring Fiend) — 5:25
14. "Ghetto Tears" (featuring Master P) — 3:44
15. "End of the Road" — 4:20
