= List of Billboard number-one R&B albums of 1999 =

These are the Billboard magazine R&B albums that reached number one in 1999.

== Chart history ==
Issue date	Album	Artist
January 2	Ghetto Fabulous	Mystikal
January 9	Flesh of My Flesh, Blood of My Blood	DMX
January 16	Flesh of My Flesh, Blood of My Blood	DMX
January 23	Flesh of My Flesh, Blood of My Blood	DMX
January 30	Flesh of My Flesh, Blood of My Blood	DMX
February 6	Made Man	Silkk the Shocker
February 13	Chyna Doll	Foxy Brown
February 20	Chyna Doll	Foxy Brown
February 27	The Miseducation of Lauryn Hill	Lauryn Hill
March 6	Da Next Level	Mr. Serv-On
March 13	FanMail	TLC
March 20	FanMail	TLC
March 27	Bossalinie	C-Murder
April 3	FanMail	TLC
April 10	The Slim Shady LP	Eminem
April 17	FanMail	TLC
April 24	I Am...	Nas
May 1	I Am...	Nas
May 8	I Am...	Nas
May 15	Ryde or Die Vol. 1	Ruff Ryders
May 22	Ryde or Die Vol. 1	Ruff Ryders
May 29	No Limit Top Dogg	Snoop Dogg
June 5	In Our Lifetime	8Ball & MJG
June 12	The Art of Storytelling	Slick Rick
June 19	Venni Vetti Vecci	Ja Rule
June 26	Venni Vetti Vecci	Ja Rule
July 3	Venni Vetti Vecci	Ja Rule
July 10	Da Real World	Missy "Misdemeanor" Elliott
July 17	Beneath the Surface	GZA/Genius
July 24	Street Life	Fiend
July 31	Can't Stay Away	Too Short
August 7	Can't Stay Away	Too Short
August 14	Guerrilla Warfare	Hot Boys
August 21	Coming of Age	Memphis Bleek
August 28	Violator: The Album	Various artists (Violator Records)
September 4	Mary	Mary J. Blige
September 11	Forever	Puff Daddy
September 18	Mary	Mary J. Blige
September 25	Mary	Mary J. Blige
October 2	Let There Be Eve...Ruff Ryders' First Lady	Eve
October 9	Let There Be Eve...Ruff Ryders' First Lady	Eve
October 16	Blackout!	Method Man & Redman
October 23	Blackout!	Method Man & Redman
October 30	Let There Be Eve...Ruff Ryders' First Lady	Eve
November 6	Let There Be Eve...Ruff Ryders' First Lady	Eve
November 13	Only God Can Judge Me	Master P
November 20	Tha Block Is Hot	Lil Wayne
November 27	Tha Block Is Hot	Lil Wayne
December 4	2001	Dr. Dre
December 11	2001	Dr. Dre
December 18	2001	Dr. Dre
December 25	Born Again	The Notorious B.I.G.

== See also ==
- 1999 in music
- R&B number-one hits of 1999 (USA)
- List of number-one R&B hits (United States)
- List of number-one albums of 1999 (U.S.)
