= Mask of the Demon =

Mask of the Demon may refer to:

- Black Sunday (1960 film) (Italian: La maschera del demonio, trans. The Mask of the Demon), a 1960 Italian gothic horror film
- Mask of the Demon (album), a 2011 album by Sutter Kain with his protege Donnie Darko
