= Mama Always Told Me =

Mama Always Told Me may refer to:

- "Mama Always Told Me", by rapper Silkk the Shocker Charge It 2 da Game (1998)
- "Mama Always Told Me", by Sleepy Brown
- "Mama Always Told Me", by rapper G-Eazy from The Beautiful & Damned (2017)
