= MP da Last Don (film) =

1998 film directed by Master P

- Theatrical poster
- Directed by: Michael Martin; Master P
- Written by: Regina McLeod; Master P
- Produced by: Master P (exec.)
- Starring: Master P Silkk the Shocker; Snoop Dogg; Varshini Soobiah; Mia X C-Murder; Boz
- Cinematography: Steve Gainer
- Edited by: T. David Binns
- Music by: Dino Herrmann
- Distributed by: No Limit Films
- Release date: December 31, 1998
- Running time: 58 minutes
- Country: United States
- Language: English

MP da Last Don is a 1998 direct-to-video American crime film starring rapper Master P. Distributed by No Limit Films and Shooting Star Pictures, the 58-minute short film was also written and directed by Master P. The cast included other artists with the No Limit Records label such as Silkk the Shocker, Mia X, and Snoop Dogg, in support roles. Although the film was panned by critics, the soundtrack album of MP da Last Don went quadruple platinum.

Before MP da Last Don, Master P had produced another direct-to-video film, I'm Bout It, in 1996. According to Master P, as of October 1998, he had sold 500,000 copies of the first video, and 400,000 copies of MP da Last Don.

== Plot ==
Nino (Master P) is a basketball coach who never wanted the life of a gangster. When his father, the head of a crime family, is gunned down in the street, Nino finds himself pursuing revenge. Taking over the family business, he swears to change things, but he, too, becomes greedy and murderous.

== Cast ==
- Master P as Nino
- Silkk the Shocker as D.J.
- John Marlo as Rico
- Boz as Tony
- Varshini Soobiah as Alyssa
- Randall Bosley as Collins
- Mia X as Nicey
- James DiStefano as The Don
- C-Murder as Cuban Guard
- Snoop Dogg as Bar Patron
- Cody Jackson as Fat Boy
- Rena Riffel as Dancer

== Reception ==
A 1998 review in Billboard magazine called MP da Last Don "a glorified music video that steals plot points and characters" from Scarface and The Godfather film series. It also criticized the acting, saying, "Accents change, delivery is monotone, and expressions are blanker than those seen on C-SPAN."
