= Ghetto Fabulous (album) =

Studio album by Mystikal
- Released: December 15, 1998
- Recorded: 1998
- Genre: Gangsta rap
- Length: 60:18
- Labels: No Limit; Jive
- Producers: Master P (exec.); Beats by the Pound; Dez

Mystikal chronology
Unpredictable (1997)	Ghetto Fabulous (1998)	Let's Get Ready (2000)

Singles from Ghetto Fabulous
- 1. "That's the Nigga" Released: August 11, 1998

Professional ratings
Review scores
Source	Rating
AllMusic	3/5 stars
Entertainment Weekly	B+
Rolling Stone	3/5 stars
The Source	3/5 stars

Ghetto Fabulous is the third studio album by American rapper Mystikal. It was released on December 15, 1998, by No Limit Records and distributed by Jive Records. It was produced by Beats by the Pound.

Like his previous album, this also proved to be a success peaking at #5 on the Billboard 200 and #1 on the Top R&B/Hip-Hop Albums selling 386,000 copies in its first week. A single, "That's the Nigga", reached #25 on the Hot R&B/Hip-Hop Singles & Tracks. This was Mystikal's final album with No Limit Records. The album was also certified platinum by the RIAA on January 27, 1999. On January 29, 2000, Ghetto Fabulous had sold 2,901,131 records in the U.S.

== Track listing ==
No.	Title	Writer(s)	Producer(s)	Length
1.	"Round Out the Tank"	Mystikal	KLC	3:08
2.	"There He Go" (featuring Guillotine)	Mystikal; Guillotine	Carlos Stephens	3:33
3.	"Keep It Hype"	Mystikal	Mo B Dick	3:56
4.	"That's the Nigga"	Shawn Moltke; Marlon Williams; Mystikal	KLC	3:27
5.	"Ghetto Fabulous" (featuring Charlie Wilson and Snoop Dogg)	Mystikal; Charlie Wilson; Snoop Dogg	Craig B	4:13
6.	"Life Ain't Cool" (featuring Silkk the Shocker and Master P)	Mystikal; Silkk the Shocker; Master P	Craig B	3:52
7.	"I'm on Fire"	Mystikal	KLC	3:40
8.	"Whacha Want, Whacha Need" (featuring Busta Rhymes)	Mystikal; Busta Rhymes	KLC	4:17
9.	"The Stick Up" (featuring Mia X and Fiend)	Mystikal; Mia X; Fiend	O'Dell	2:54
10.	"I Smell Smoke"	Mystikal	O'Dell	3:29
11.	"Respect My Mind" (featuring Guillotine)	Mystikal; Guillotine	Mo B Dick	2:50
12.	"Stack Yo Chips" (featuring Master P and C-Murder)	Mystikal; Master P; C-Murder; Sal Abbatiello; Mark Morales; David Reeves; Darren Robinson; Larry Smith; Kurtis Walker; Damon Wimbley	Dez	3:13
13.	"Dirty South, Dirty Jerz" (featuring Naughty By Nature)	Mystikal; Naughty By Nature	KLC	4:00
14.	"Yaah!"	Mystikal	KLC	4:26
15.	"Let's Go Do It" (featuring Snoop Dogg and Silkk the Shocker)	Mystikal; Snoop Dogg; Silkk the Shocker	Craig B	4:18
16.	"What's Your Alias?" (featuring Fiend, Mac, and Silkk the Shocker)	Mystikal; Fiend; Mac; Silkk the Shocker	Craig B	4:32

Sample credits

- "That's the Nigga" contains samples from "The Bridge", written by Shawn Moltke and Marlon Williams, as performed by MC Shan, and "How Ya Livin'" as performed by Low Profile.
- "Stack Yo Chips" contains a portion of the composition "Jail House Rap", written by Sal Abbatiello, Mark Morales, David Reeves, Darren Robinson, Larry Smith, Kurtis Walker, and Damon Wimbley, as performed by The Fat Boys.

== Personnel ==
- Beats by the Pound – engineer, mixing
- Tony Dawsey – mastering

== Charts ==
=== Weekly charts ===
Chart (1999)	Peak position
US Billboard 200	5
US Top R&B/Hip-Hop Albums (Billboard)	1

=== Year-end charts ===
Chart (1999)	Position
US Billboard 200	69
US Top R&B/Hip-Hop Albums (Billboard)	11

== Certifications ==
Certifications for Ghetto Fabulous
Region	Certification	Certified units/sales
United States (RIAA)	Platinum	1,000,000^{^}
^{^} Shipments figures based on certification alone.

== See also ==
- List of number-one R&B albums of 1999 (U.S.)
