= I Miss My Homies =

1997 single by Master P

Single by Master P featuring Silkk the Shocker, Pimp C, Mo B. Dick, O'Dell and Sons of Funk

from the album Ghetto D
- Released: August 19, 1997
- Recorded: 1997
- Genre: Hip hop; R&B
- Length: 5:25
- Label: No Limit; Priority
- Songwriters: Percy Miller; Vyshonn King Miller; Chad L. Butler
- Producers: Mo B. Dick; KLC; Odell

Master P singles chronology
"If I Could Change" (1997)	"I Miss My Homies" (1997)	"4, 3, 2, 1" (1997)

Silkk the Shocker singles chronology
"I Always Feel Like (Somebody's Watching Me)" (1997)	"I Miss My Homies" (1997)	"Ain't No Limit" (1997)

Pimp C singles chronology
"Front, Back & Side to Side" (1994)	"I Miss My Homies" (1997)	"Take It Off" (1999)

Mo B. Dick singles chronology
"I Always Feel Like (Somebody's Watching Me)" (1997)	"I Miss My Homies" (1997)	"A 2nd Chance" (1998)

O'Dell singles chronology
"I Miss My Homies" (1997)	"Just Be Straight with Me" (1998)

Sons of Funk singles chronology
"I Miss My Homies" (1997)	"Pushin' Inside You" (1997)

"I Miss My Homies" is a song written and performed by American rappers Master P, Silkk the Shocker and Pimp C. It was released on August 19, 1997 via No Limit/Priority Records as the lead single from Master P's sixth solo studio album Ghetto D, a month prior to the album's unveiling. Produced by Beats By The Pound members Mo B. Dick, KLC and Odell, it also features vocals from Mo B. Dick, Odell, Sons of Funk and Mercedes.

The single peaked at number 25 on the Billboard Hot 100, number 16 on the Hot R&B/Hip-Hop Songs and number two on the Hot Rap Songs charts in the United States. It was certified Gold by the Recording Industry Association of America on January 9, 1998 for selling 500,000 units in the US alone.

== Track listing ==
No.	Title	Writer(s)	Producer(s)	Length
1.	"I Miss My Homies" (Radio)	Percy Miller; Vyshonn King Miller; Chad L. Butler	Mo B. Dick; KLC; Odell
2.	"I Miss My Homies" (Street)		Mo B. Dick; KLC; Odell
3.	"Here We Go" (Bonus Track)	P. Miller; Michael Tyler; Richard Jones	Craig B.
4.	"I Miss My Homies" (Instrumental)		Mo B. Dick; KLC; Odell

== Personnel ==
- Percy "Master P" Miller – songwriter, vocals, executive producer
- Vyshonn "Silkk the Shocker" Miller – songwriter, vocals
- Chad "Pimp C" Butler – songwriter, vocals
- Raymond Emile "Mo B. Dick" Poole – vocals, producer
- Odell Vickers Jr. – vocals, producer
- Sons of Funk – vocals
- Raquel "Mercedes" Miller – vocals
- Nathan "Happy" Pérez – guitar
- Craig Stephen "KLC" Lawson – producer

== Charts ==
Chart (1997)	Peak position
US Billboard Hot 100	25
US Hot R&B/Hip-Hop Songs (Billboard)	16
US R&B/Hip-Hop Airplay (Billboard)	40
US Hot Rap Songs (Billboard)	2

== Certifications ==
Region	Certification	Certified units/sales
United States (RIAA)	Gold	600,000
