= List of Billboard 200 number-one albums of 1999 =

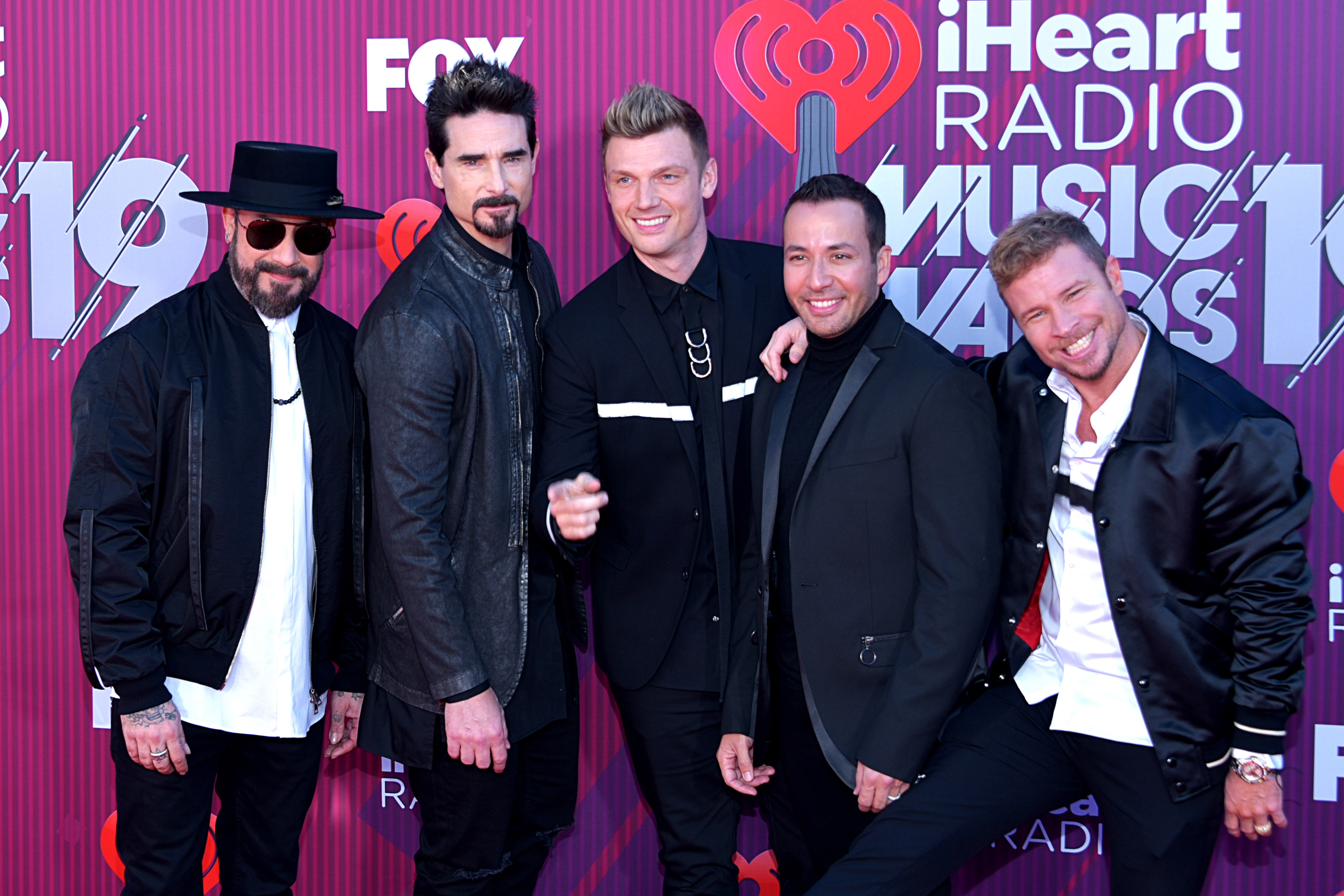
In 1999, the Backstreet Boys' album Millennium established a new record for the largest sales in a single week since Nielsen SoundScan began tracking sales in 1991.

The Billboard 200, published in Billboard magazine, is a weekly chart that ranks the highest-selling music albums and EPs in the United States. These data are compiled by Nielsen SoundScan from a database of merchants that represents more than 90% of the U.S. music retail market. The sample includes not only music stores and the music departments at electronics and department stores, but also direct-to-consumer transactions and internet sales (both physical albums and the ones bought via digital downloads).

There were 23 number-one albums on this chart in 1999, including Garth Brook's Double Live which, starting in early December 1998, spent a consecutive run of five weeks at the top of the chart. Rapper DMX' Flesh of My Flesh, Blood of My Blood debuted at number one, making it his second album that debuted at the top of the chart. Pop singer Britney Spears's first album ...Baby One More Time peaked at number one for six non-consecutive weeks. Certified as diamond by the Recording Industry Association of America (RIAA), it made her the youngest artist that reach the ten million sales mark and the top selling female act of 1999. TLC's third album, Fanmail, the year's top selling hip-hop album, remained at number one for five weeks and won the Grammy Award for Best R&B Album at the 42nd Grammy Awards.

I Am…, the third studio album by rapper Nas, stayed at the top of the chart for two weeks and has been certified double platinum by the RIAA. Puerto Rican pop singer Ricky Martin's eponymous set achieved sales of six million copies, making it the year's top-selling album by a solo male artist. Millennium by vocal group Backstreet Boys spent ten weeks at number one on the chart, selling 1,130,000 copies in its first week of release, establishing a new record for the largest sales in a single week since Nielsen SoundScan began tracking sales in 1991. Millennium became the best-selling album of 1999, with sales of over 11 million copies. The album also received an Album of the Year and a Best Pop Vocal Album nomination at the Grammy Awards. Nu metal band Limp Bizkit released their second album Significant Other, which debuted at number one and sold over five million copies by the end of the year; this helped push Limp Bizkit's first album past the platinum mark. Pop/R&B singer Christina Aguilera's self-titled debut album was released in August 1999. Its lead single "Genie in a Bottle" reached the top of the singles chart for five weeks, which helped the album reach the number one position in September, selling five million copies by January 2000.

Fly by the country group Dixie Chicks peaked at number one for two weeks, making them the first country group to reach the top of the Billboard 200; the album received the Grammy Award for Best Country Album. Human Clay, the second album by post-grunge band Creed, became a hit, entering the charts at number one and selling ten million copies over the next two years. Latin rock band Santana's Supernatural, was the longest-running number-one album of the year, topping the chart for twelve non-consecutive weeks, three of which were in 1999, making it his first number-one album in 28 years. The album sold five million copies in 1999 and won two Grammy Awards for Best Rock Album and for Album of the Year. Breathe, the fourth album by country artist Faith Hill, entered the charts at number one upon its release in late 1999. Its title track became Hill's biggest hit, topping the country and the adult contemporary singles charts; the album sold five million copies by the end of 2000 and won the Grammy Award for Best Country Album at the 43rd Grammy Awards. Born Again by The Notorious B.I.G. was the second posthumous album by the rapper to reach number-one on the albums chart, and the seventh posthumous title to reach the top during the 1990s.

== Chart history ==
Key
†	Indicates best performing album of 1999

Issue date	Album	Artist(s)	Label	Sales	Ref.
January 2	Double Live	Garth Brooks	Capitol	548,000	
January 9	Flesh of My Flesh, Blood of My Blood	DMX	Ruff Ryders	670,000	
January 16	Flesh of My Flesh, Blood of My Blood	DMX	Ruff Ryders	248,000	
January 23	Flesh of My Flesh, Blood of My Blood	DMX	Ruff Ryders	134,672	
January 30	...Baby One More Time	Britney Spears	Jive	120,567	
February 6	Made Man	Silkk The Shocker	No Limit	240,244	
February 13	Chyna Doll	Foxy Brown	Violator	172,000	
February 20	…Baby One More Time	Britney Spears	Jive	182,000	
February 27	…Baby One More Time	Britney Spears	Jive	229,000	
March 6	…Baby One More Time	Britney Spears	Jive	198,000	
March 13	FanMail	TLC	LaFace	318,000	
March 20	FanMail	TLC	LaFace	226,000	
March 27	FanMail	TLC	LaFace	202,000	
April 3	FanMail	TLC	LaFace	192,988	
April 10	…Baby One More Time	Britney Spears	Jive	167,900	
April 17	…Baby One More Time	Britney Spears	Jive	272,820	
April 24	I Am…	Nas	Columbia	471,000	
May 1	I Am…	Nas	Columbia	206,000	
May 8	FanMail	TLC	LaFace	180,000	
May 15	Ruff Ryders Ryde or Die Vol. 1	Ruff Ryders / Various Artists	Ruff Ryders	283,000	
May 22	A Place in the Sun	Tim McGraw	Curb	251,000	
May 29	Ricky Martin	Ricky Martin	Columbia	660,807	
June 5	Millennium †	Backstreet Boys	Jive	1,133,505	
June 12	Millennium †	Backstreet Boys	Jive	621,621	
June 19	Millennium †	Backstreet Boys	Jive	438,000	
June 26	Millennium †	Backstreet Boys	Jive	371,000	
July 3	Millennium †	Backstreet Boys	Jive	338,000	
July 10	Significant Other	Limp Bizkit	Flip	634,000	
July 17	Significant Other	Limp Bizkit	Flip	334,500	
July 24	Significant Other	Limp Bizkit	Flip	264,000	
July 31	Millennium †	Backstreet Boys	Jive	272,000	
August 7	Millennium †	Backstreet Boys	Jive	244,900	
August 14	Significant Other	Limp Bizkit	Flip	250,241	
August 21	Millennium †	Backstreet Boys	Jive	233,000	
August 28	Millennium †	Backstreet Boys	Jive	250,000	
September 4	Millennium †	Backstreet Boys	Jive	242,000	
September 11	Christina Aguilera	Christina Aguilera	RCA	252,800	
September 18	Fly	Dixie Chicks	Monument	341,138	
September 25	Fly	Dixie Chicks	Monument	203,000	
October 2	Ruff Ryders' First Lady	Eve	Ruff Ryders	213,000	
October 9	The Fragile	Nine Inch Nails	Nothing	228,746	
October 16	Human Clay	Creed	Wind-Up	315,000	
October 23	Human Clay	Creed	Wind-Up	190,055	
October 30	Supernatural	Santana	Arista	169,500	
November 6	Supernatural	Santana	Arista	183,000	
November 13	Supernatural	Santana	Arista	199,000	
November 20	The Battle of Los Angeles	Rage Against the Machine	Epic	430,000	
November 27	Breathe	Faith Hill	Warner Bros.	242,229	
December 4	Issues	Korn	Immortal	573,785	
December 11	All the Way... A Decade of Song	Celine Dion	550 Music	393,927	
December 18	All the Way... A Decade of Song	Celine Dion	550 Music	327,000	
December 25	Born Again	The Notorious B.I.G.	Bad Boy	485,000	

== See also ==
- 1999 in music
- List of number-one albums (United States)
