= Sutter Kain =

American rapper

- Also known as: DJ Bless, Sutter Kain, Suicide Kingz, Sutter Kain aka DJ Bless
- Born: Robert Deshawn Evans; 1983 or 1984 (age 41–42)
- Origin: South Jamaica, Queens, New York City
- Genres: East Coast hip hop, rap metal, hardcore rap, horrorcore
- Occupations: Rapper, Hip hop producer
- Instrument: Akai MPC
- Years active: 1997–present
- Label: Never So Deep Records
- Website: ghettometalgear.bandcamp.com

Robert Deshawn Evans (born 1983 or 1984), better known by his stage names Sutter Kain and DJ Bless, is an American rapper and producer from Queens, New York. His productions range from traditional East Coast hip hop to ghetto metal, a style that samples metalcore. The name Sutter Kain is based on the character Sutter Cane from the 1995 horror film In the Mouth of Madness. He is the founder and owner of Never So Deep Records.

== Career ==
Evans grew up in Rochdale Village, a housing development in South Jamaica, Queens, in New York City. He pursued music with his initial goal to become a battle DJ. He eventually left New York City and moved to the Carolinas.

In 2002, at the age of 18, Evans landed his first recording and distribution deal with MCA Records. In 2003, when MCA was merged into Geffen Records, he parted ways and focused on his own record label, Never So Deep Records. He restructured the business to control aspects of the label including music/video production, marketing, promotions, and distribution. Realizing that technology could play a major role in positioning his company, he took advantage of online distribution and social networking.

As DJ Bless, Evans has showcased his production skills with producers Kanye West, Scott Storch, Sean Combs, Swizz Beatz, Sha Money, Rick Rubin, Havoc, and R. Kelly. He produced the track "Tha Beehive" on Lil' Kim's album La Bella Mafia. In 2004–2005, he did high-profile remixes of Mystikal's "Pussy Pop", Dirt Bag's "I'll Leave You Dead", and Keith Murray and the Outlaws. In 2005–2006, he produced and mixed tracks on Czar-Nok's album That One Way. He produced music for the video game EA Sports Fight Night 2005. In 2008, he worked on the musical score of the docudrama Hoop Realities, which is a follow-up to the documentary Hoop Dreams.

== Never So Deep Records ==
Never So Deep Records (NSD Digital)
- Founder: Robert Evans (DJ Bless)
- Status: Active
- Distributor: Self-Distribution
- Genre: Hip hop, ghetto metal
- Country of origin: United States
- Location: New York / South Carolina
- Official website: ghettometalgear.bandcamp.com

Current artists

- DJ Bless aka Sutter Kain
- Donnie Darko
- Apollo Valdez
- Upon Oath
- Daniel Gun

Former artists

- Swan The Truth (Agency 1994)
- Jim Snooka (aka Dirty Dickens)
- Hue Hef
- Insane Poetry

== Style ==
Evans's style varies from traditional East Coast hip hop to more menacing extreme metal-based hip hop, the latter of which he calls ghetto metal and serves as the vehicle for his alter ego, Sutter Kain. DJ Bless's lyrics involve love, relationships, life and problems. In contrast, Sutter Kain's lyrics focus on taboo subjects such as torture, murder, and gore.

== Discography ==
=== Studio albums ===
- DJ Bless Presents Suicide Kingz, Vol. 1 (1998)
- DJ Bless Presents Suicide Kingz, Vol. 2 (2002)
- August Underground: Tha Making of Sutter Kain (2006)
- A Perfect Murder (2007)
- A Co-Dependent's Playlist (2011)
- Ghetto Metal King (2012)
- DeathStrumentals Vol. 1 (2012)

=== Singles ===
Year	Single	Featuring	credited as	Notes
2009	"Hold Up"	Young Vadah	Sabotawj & DJ Bless	
2009	"Black Tar Heroin"	Jim Snooka	DJ Bless	
2009	"Death Note"	---	Sutter Kain	single EP is titled Beats Inspired by a Bitch
2009	"As Death Takes Place"	Reverend Fang Gory	Donnie Darko & DJ Bless	title track of Donnie Darko's album
2009	"Faceless"	Jim Snooka & E-Clipse	DJ Bless	
2009	"Slanted"	---	Sabotawj & DJ Bless	track from their album Dreaming Up Nightmares While The World Sleeps
2009	"Shotgun Memories"	NBS	DJ Bless	
2009	"Heavy Metal Mics"	Wordsmith	DJ Bless	
2010	"South Side Story"	Young Vadah	DJ Bless	
2010	"I Made It"	Young Vadah	DJ Bless & Donnie Darko	
2010	"Natural Born Spitters"	NBS	DJ Bless	
2010	"Hammertime"	Jim Snooka	DJ Bless	
2010	"Backstage Madness"	Dwight Anderson & Jim Snooka	DJ Bless	
2010	"Trails of Blood"	Donnie Darko	Sutter Kain	
2011	"Loser 9"	---	Sutter Kain & Darko	found on Sutter Kain's A Co-Dependent's Playlist and Darko's Emotional Disorder albums also subtitled The Final Chapter
2011	"Trust Issues"	---	Sutter Kain & Darko	
2011	"U.F.O. Transmission"	---	Sutter Kain & Darko	
2011	L.O.V.E. (Life's Obsessive Violent Emotions)	---	Sutter Kain	
2011	"Where I Belong"	Donnie Darko	Sutter Kain	
2012	"Winter Music Pt. 4"	Darko & Mr. Grimm	Sutter Kain	
2012	"Traitor"	Naymez & Donnie Darko	Sutter Kain	
2012	"Y'all Ain't Kill Me Yet	Donnie Darko & Persia	Sutter Kain	
2012	"Alien Abduction"	Darko	Sutter Kain	
2012	"Shoot Her in the Face" (Ghetto Metal King)	Rev Fang Gory & Insane Poetry	Sutter Kain	
2013	"Keep Breathing"	---	Sutter Kain	

== Producer ==
=== Sutter Kain and Donnie Darko ===
- The Darko Effect (2005) [Donnie Darko]
- Black Sunday (2005)
- Art of Tha Devil (2006) [Donnie Darko]
- Devil May Cry (2007) [Donnie Darko]
- As Death Takes Place (2010) [Donnie Darko] (Note: This album also has an instrumental version that was produced by DJ Bless aka Sutter Kain)
- The Anxiety Theory (2010) [Donnie Darko]
- Black Sunday: Mask of the Demon (2011), produced as Black Sunday
- Emotional Disorder (2011)
- The Green Album (2012) (Note: The Green Album by Sutter Kain and Donnie Darko is labeled as "Sticky Green Beats presents")
- Life Ep, Vol. 1 (2012)
- Redemption (2014) [Donnie Darko]
- Laugh Now Die Later (2015)

=== Agency 1.9.9.4 ===
Evans teamed up with Swan The Truth to form the duo Agency 1.9.9.4, which released two albums:

- Dayz of Our Lives (2005)
- Real Life Isn't as Dope as the Movies (2006)

=== Pull The Fuckin' Trigger ===
Sutter Kain, Donnie Darko & Apollo Valdez

- Until it's My Time To Die (2018)

=== Never So Deep artists ===
- Pain by Infinity the Ghetto Child (2002)
- Tha Carolina Spokesman by Hue Hef (2006)
- Sutter Kain Presents Cyco the Snuff Reels by Insane Poetry (2008)
- "Help" single by Jim Snooka (2009)
- The Gospels of Reverend Wallace by Jim Snooka (2009)
- Dreaming Up Nightmares While the World Sleeps by Sabotawj (2010)
- Runaway Train of Thought EP by McNastee (2012)
- Way Of The Gun (2015) Album by Daniel Gun & Sutter Kain

=== Other collaborations ===
- "Tha Beehive" by Lil' Kim (2003)
- "Pussy Pop (Remix)" by Mystikal (2004)
- "The Essence" (12-inch single) by Choclair (2009)
- K-Ci & Jojo Come Clean theme music (2010)
- "T-Dot" by Choclair (2011)
- "Packinamac" by Dope Sasquatch feat. Ren Thomas, Halfcut, Hex One, Planet Asia, Tone Spliff and Sutter Kain
