= Ain't No Limit =

Single by Mystikal featuring Silkk the Shocker

from the album Unpredictable
- Released: 1997
- Recorded: 1997
- Genre: Hip hop, southern hip hop
- Length: 4:12
- Label: No Limit, Jive
- Songwriters: M. Tyler, V. Miller, P. Miller
- Producers: Master P (exec.); Beats by the Pound (exec.)

Mystikal singles chronology
"Here I Go" (1996)	"Ain't No Limit" (1997)	"Make 'Em Say Uhh!" (1998)

Silkk the Shocker singles chronology
"I Miss My Homies" (1997)	"Ain't No Limit" (1997)	"Make 'Em Say Uhh!" (1998)

"Ain't No Limit" is the first single from Mystikal's second studio album titled Unpredictable. It features fellow No Limit rapper, Silkk the Shocker. The song was minor success peaking at #63 on the Hot R&B/Hip-Hop Singles & Tracks.

== Chart positions ==
Chart (1997)	Peak position
U.S. Billboard Hot R&B/Hip-Hop Singles & Tracks	63
