= He Did That =

2000 single by Silkk the Shocker

Single by Silkk the Shocker featuring Mac and Master P

from the album My World, My Way
- Released: September 5, 2000
- Recorded: 2000
- Genre: Hip hop
- Length: 3:24
- Label: No Limit; Priority
- Songwriter: V. Miller/M. Phillips
- Producer: Donald XL Robertson

Silkk the Shocker singles chronology
| "Live or Die" (1999) | "He Did That" (2000) | "That's Cool" (2001) |

Master P singles chronology
| "Da Ballers" (1999) | "He Did That" (2000) | "Lay Low" (2001) |

Mac singles chronology
| "If it's Cool" (1999) | "He Did That" (2000) |

"He Did That" is the first single released by American rapper Silkk the Shocker from his fourth album, My World, My Way. It was produced by Donald XL Robertson and featured Mac and Master P. "He Did That" peaked at number 50 on the Billboard Hot R&B/Hip-Hop Singles & Tracks and number 3 on the Billboard Hot Rap Singles.

== Music video ==
The music video takes place a mansion filled with Mercedes-Benz cars and SUV, also featuring appearances by Master P.

== Single track listing ==
=== CD ===
1. "He Did That" [Radio Edit]- 3:26
2. "He Did That" [Album Version]- 3:30
3. "He Did That" [Multimedia track]- 3:36
4. "He Did That" [Instrumental]- 3:20

== Charts ==
| Chart (2000) | Peak Position |
|---|---|
| U.S. Billboard Hot R&B/Hip-Hop Singles & Tracks | 50 |
| U.S. Billboard Hot Rap Singles | 3 |
