= The Shocker (album) =

Studio album by Silkk
- Released: August 20, 1996
- Genres: West Coast hip-hop; gangsta rap
- Length: 74:54
- Labels: No Limit; Priority; EMI
- Producers: Carlos Stephens; Craig B; KLC; Ken Franklin; Mo B. Dick; DJ Daryl; T-Bone

Silkk chronology
The Shocker (1996)	Charge It 2 da Game (1998)

Professional ratings
Review scores
Source	Rating
AllMusic	1.5/5 stars
The Source	2.5/5 stars

The Shocker is the debut album of the American rapper Silkk the Shocker, who was then known as Silkk. It was released on August 20, 1996, by No Limit Records and Priority Records. It features production by Beats by the Pound and guest appearances from C-Murder and Mia X, among others. The Shocker was only a mild success compared to some of his future albums and made it to number 49 on the US Billboard 200 and No. 6 on the Top R&B/Hip-Hop Albums. As with most of No Limit's albums, this featured a lot of guest appearances from members of the record label, including his brothers, Master P and C-Murder, and group TRU.

== Background ==
Planning of this album dates as far back as early 1995, as advertisements for the album can be seen on the back cover of earlier copies of Master P's 1995 album 99 Ways to Die. The initial cover for the album had Silkk holding a handgun, which would later be covered by a "Parental Advisory" sticker on the official release.

== Track listing ==
No.	Title	Producer(s)	Length
1.	"Murder" (featuring Master P and Big Ed the Assassin)	DJ Daryl	5:04
2.	"I Ain't Takin' No Shorts"	Ken Franklin (K-Lou)	2:56
3.	"I Represent"	Craig B.	4:55
4.	"The Shocker" (featuring Master P)	KLC; Mo B. Dick	4:45
5.	"No Limit Party" (featuring Master P and Mia X)	KLC	5:38
6.	"Freeloaders" (featuring Mo B. Dick)	Craig B.	4:33
7.	"1 Morning"	Craig B.	1:30
8.	"How We Mobb" (featuring Master P)	Ken Franklin	3:59
9.	"It's On"	KLC	3:48
10.	"Ain't Nothing"	Mo B. Dick	4:18
11.	"Ghetto Tears" (featuring Master P)	Carlos Stephens	3:43
12.	"Mr."	Carlos Stephens; KLC	3:50
13.	"It's Time to Ride" (featuring Master P)	Carlos Stephens	3:04
14.	"If My 9 Could Talk"	KLC	3:43
15.	"Commercial One" (performed by Skull Duggery)	Carlos Stephens	0:48
16.	"Got 'Em Fiending" (featuring Master P)	Ken Franklin	3:41
17.	"My Car" (feat. Pure Passion & Mo B. Dick)	Mo B. Dick	4:32
18.	"Ghetto 211" (featuring Master P)	T-Bone	4:48
19.	"Why My Homie" (feat. Master P & C-Murder)	Mo B. Dick	5:21
Total length:			74:54

== Personnel ==
- Craig B. - Producer
- Big Ed - Featured Artist, Performer, Primary Artist, Vocals
- C-Murder - Featured Artist, Performer, Primary Artist, Vocals
- DJ Daryl - Producer
- Ken Franklin - Engineer, Mixing, Producer
- KLC- Engineer Mixing, Producer
- Ken Lee - Mastering
- Master P - Executive Producer, Featured Artist, Guest Artist, Performer, Vocals
- Mia X - Featured Artist, Guest Artist, Performer, Primary Artist, Vocals
- Mo B. Dick - Engineer, Featured Artist, Mixing, Performer, Producer, Vocals
- Pure Passion - Featured Artist, Performer, Primary Artist, Vocals
- Silkk the Shocker - Performer, Primary Artist
- Skull Duggrey - Composer, Featured Artist, Guest Artist, Performer, Vocals
- Carlos Stephens - Engineer, Mixing
- Matt Studio - Editing
- T-Bone - Producer
- TRU - Guest Artist

== Charts ==
Chart (1996)	Peak position
U.S. Billboard Top 200	49
U.S. Top R&B/Hip-Hop Albums	6
