= I'm Bout It =

1997 film directed by Master P

- Theatrical poster
- Directed by: Moon Jones; Master P
- Written by: Master P Moon Jones
- Produced by: Master P (exec.)
- Starring: Master P Moon Jones; Silkk the Shocker; Anthony Boswell; C-Murder; Kane & Abel; Mack 10; Mr. Serv-On; Mia X
- Cinematography: Francisco Gonzalez
- Distributed by: No Limit Films
- Release date: June 6, 1997
- Running time: 90 minutes
- Country: United States
- Language: English

I'm Bout It is a 1997 American drama comedy film by rapper Master P. The film stars Master P, Moon Jones, Anthony Boswell, Silkk the Shocker, Mack 10, C-Murder, Mia X, and Mr. Serv-On.

== Plot ==
The movie chronicles New Orleans through the eyes of Master P growing up in the notorious Calliope Projects. His brother Kevin Miller is played by Anthony Boswell. Master P wrote, directed, and acted in the film. It was an independent release.

== Release ==
The film was released directly to video.

== See also ==
- I'm Bout It (soundtrack)
- List of hood films
