= Just Be Straight with Me =

"Just Be Straight With Me"

Single by Silkk the Shocker featuring Master P, Destiny's Child, O'Dell and Mo B. Dick

from the album Charge It 2 da Game
- Released: January 23, 1998
- Recorded: 1997
- Length: 4:21
- Label: No Limit/Priority
- Producer: Craig B.

Silkk the Shocker singles chronology
"Make 'Em Say Uhh!" (1998)	"Just Be Straight With Me" (1998)	"Let's Ride" (1998)

Master P singles chronology
"Make 'Em Say Uhh!" (1998)	"Just Be Straight With Me" (1998)	"Let's Ride" (1998)

Destiny's Child singles chronology
"No, No, No" (1997)	"Just Be Straight With Me" (1998)	"With Me" (1998)

"Just Be Straight with Me" is the first single from rapper Silkk the Shocker's second album Charge It 2 da Game. It features rap verses by Master P as well as lead vocals from Destiny's Child and production by Beats by the Pound member Craig B. "Just Be Straight with Me" found minor success on the Billboard charts, making it to three of the magazine's charts, gaining some success on the rap charts.

== Samples/covers ==
"Just Be Straight with Me" was sampled on track 10 of Bun B's second album II Trill called "Good II Me", which featured Mýa, who later collaborated with Silkk in 1998 on her song "Movin' On".

== Charts ==
=== Weekly charts ===
Chart (1998)	Peak position
U.S. Billboard Hot 100	57
U.S. Billboard Hot R&B/Hip-Hop Singles & Tracks	36
Billboard Hot Rap Singles	12

=== Year-end charts ===
Chart (1998)	Position
U.S.Billboard Hot Rap Singles	38
