= Woof (song) =

1998 single by Snoop Dogg featuring Mystikal and Fiend

Single by Snoop Dogg featuring Mystikal and Fiend

from the album Da Game Is to Be Sold, Not to Be Told
- Released: October 26, 1998
- Recorded: 1998
- Genre: Hip hop
- Length: 4:22
- Label: No Limit; Priority
- Songwriter: C. Broadus, R. Jones, M. Tyler, C. Miller, V. Miller, M. Phipps, J. Tapp, A. Johnson, E. Knight, C. Smith, C. Bazile, P. Miller, W. Collins, G. Clinton Jr.
- Producers: Craig B; Master P

Snoop Dogg singles chronology
| "Come and Get with Me" (1998) | "Woof" (1998) | "Unify" (1998) |

Mystikal singles chronology
| "It Ain't My Fault" (1998) | "Woof" (1998) | "Live or Die" (1999) |

Fiend singles chronology
| "Make 'Em Say Uhh!" (1998) | "Woof" (1998) |

"Woof" is a song by American rapper Snoop Dogg featuring Fiend and Mystikal. was released on October 26, 1998, as the second and final single of his third studio album Da Game Is to Be Sold, Not to Be Told, with the record labels No Limit Records and Priority Records.

== Track listing ==
- CD single
1. "Woof" (Album Version) (featuring Fiend and Mystikal) — 4:24
2. "Woof" (Instrumental) — 4:31
3. "It's All on a Hoe" (Bonus Track) — 5:44

== Charts ==
=== Weekly charts ===
| Chart (1999) | Peak position |
|---|---|
| US Billboard Hot 100 | 62 |
| US Hot R&B/Hip-Hop Songs (Billboard) | 31 |
| US Hot Rap Songs (Billboard) | 3 |

=== Year-end charts ===
| Chart (1999) | Position |
|---|---|
| Billboard Hot Rap Singles | 15 |
