= Make 'Em Say Uhh! =

Single by Master P featuring Fiend, Silkk the Shocker, Mia X and Mystikal

from the album Ghetto D
- Released: January 1998
- Recorded: 1997
- Genre: Hip hop
- Length: 5:06
- Label: Priority; No Limit
- Songwriters: Master P, Fiend, Silkk the Shocker, Mia X, Mystikal
- Producer: KLC

Master P singles chronology
"4, 3, 2, 1" (1997)	"Make 'Em Say Uhh!" (1998)	"I Got the Hook Up!" (1998)

Silkk the Shocker singles chronology
"I Miss My Homies" (1997)	"Make 'Em Say Uhh!" (1998)	"Just Be Straight with Me" (1998)

Mystikal singles chronology
"I Miss My Homies" (1997)	"Make 'Em Say Uhh!" (1998)	"It Ain't My Fault" (1998)

Fiend singles chronology
"I Miss My Homies" (1997)	"Make 'Em Say Uhh!" (1998)	""Take My Pain" (1998) "Woof"" (1998)

Music video
- "Make Em Say Uhh!" on YouTube

"Make Em Say Uhh!" is the second single from Master P's 1997 studio album Ghetto D, produced by KLC. The album was released in 1997, although the single was released in January 1998 by Priority Records and Master P's No Limit Records. The song featured performers Fiend, Silkk The Shocker, Mia X and Mystikal. It peaked at number 16 on the Billboard Hot 100 and became Master P's highest-charting single (it was later matched by his 1998 single "I Got the Hook Up"). "Make Em Say Uhh!" was certified 3× platinum by the Recording Industry Association of America (RIAA).

== Music video ==
The music video, directed by Michael Martin, takes place on a basketball court, with Master P, the other performers, and members of Master P's No Limit crew dancing and playing basketball. A gold tank is driven to the court, and performers dance on it. A gorilla mascot dunks a basketball and performs acrobatics. Featured in the video is an appearance from professional basketball player Shaquille O'Neal who is enthusiastic in the prowess of the performers.

The video was nominated for the MTV's Best Rap Video of 1998, but did not win.

== Remix ==
A remixed version of the song is featured on Master P's next album, MP Da Last Don with all new verses from each artist from the original, with the exception of Mystikal's verse which was replaced with one from Snoop Dogg as well as an entirely new instrumental and ends with an explosion.

== Charts ==
=== Weekly charts ===
Chart (1998)	Peak position
US Billboard Hot 100	16
US Hot R&B/Hip-Hop Songs (Billboard)	18
US Hot Rap Songs (Billboard)	6
US Rhythmic Airplay (Billboard)	32

=== Year-end charts ===
Chart (1998)	Position
US Billboard Hot 100	40
US Hot R&B/Hip-Hop Songs (Billboard)	48

== Certifications ==
Region	Certification	Certified units/sales
United States (RIAA)	Platinum	1,200,000

== Credits ==
Credits are from Apple Music and Youtube Music.

=== Artists & performers ===
- Master P – vocals
- Silkk the Shocker – vocals
- Mia X – vocals
- Fiend – vocals
- Mystikal – vocals

=== Composers & lyricists ===
- Master P – lyricist
- Silkk the Shocker – lyricist, composer
- Mia X – lyricist
- Fiend – lyricist
- Mystikal – lyricist
- KLC – composer
- Edward Fletcher – composer, sampled artist
- B. McDonald – composer, sampled artist
- Doug Wimbish – composer, sampled artist
- Craig Derry – composer, sampled artist
- George Young – composer, sampled artist
- Ricky Jones – composer, sampled artist
- Sylvia Robinson – composer, sampled artist
- Dwain Mitchell – composer, sampled artist

=== Production & engineering ===
- KLC – producer, programmer. The song features samples from the following tracks:
- "Apache" – Sugarhill Gang
- "Funkbox Party (Live)" – The Masterdon Committee
