= Unpredictable (Mystikal album) =

Studio album by Mystikal
- Released: November 11, 1997
- Recorded: 1996–1997
- Genres: Hardcore hip hop; southern hip hop
- Length: 69:47
- Labels: No Limit; Jive
- Producers: Master P (exec.); Beats By the Pound; DJ Daryl; Rick Rock; Studio Ton; The Legendary Traxster

Mystikal chronology
Mind of Mystikal (1995)	Unpredictable (1997)	Ghetto Fabulous (1998)

Singles from Unpredictable
- 1. "Ain't No Limit" Released: October 30, 1997

Professional ratings
Review scores
Source	Rating
AllMusic	3/5 stars
The Source	3.5/5 stars
The Village Voice	A−

Unpredictable is the second studio album by American rapper Mystikal. It was released on November 11, 1997, by No Limit Records and Jive Records, making it his first album for the label. Production was handled by Beats By The Pound, DJ Daryl, Rick Rock, Studio Ton and The Legendary Traxster, with Master P serving as executive producer. The album features guest appearances from Master P, E-40, B-Legit Silkk the Shocker, O'Dell, Fiend, Mac, Mia X and Snoop Doggy Dogg who made his first appearance on a No Limit Records album, however he had not yet signed with the label and is credited as still being signed to Death Row Records in the album's liner notes.

The album was a commercial success, peaking at number three on the Billboard 200 and topped the Top R&B/Hip-Hop Albums chart, and spawning the singles "Ain't No Limit" and "The Man Right Chea". It was certified platinum by the Recording Industry Association of America on April 24, 1998.

== Track listing ==
No.	Title	Writer(s)	Producer(s)	Length
1.	"Born 2 Be a Soldier" (featuring Master P, Silkk the Shocker, Fiend and Mac)	Michael Tyler; Percy Miller; Vyshonn Miller; Richard Jones; McKinley Phipps, Jr.	KLC	4:56
2.	"Murder 2"	Tyler	Rick Rock	4:14
3.	"13 Years"	Tyler	Craig B	4:37
4.	"Unpredictable"	Tyler; George Clinton, Jr.; Bernie Worrell; William Collins	DJ Daryl	3:29
5.	"Ain't No Limit" (featuring Silkk the Shocker)	Tyler; V. Miller	KLC	4:16
6.	"Ghetto Child" (featuring Master P and Silkk the Shocker)	Tyler; P. Miller; V. Miller	KLC; O'Dell	5:08
7.	"Did I Do It"	Tyler	O'Dell	3:16
8.	"Here We Go" (featuring B-Legit, E-40 and Master P)	Tyler; Brandt Jones; Earl Stevens; P. Miller	Studio Ton	4:11
9.	"We Got the Clout" (featuring Mia X)	Tyler; Mia Young	O'Dell	3:38
10.	"Still Smokin'"	Tyler	The Legendary Traxster	2:24
11.	"U Can't Handle This"	Tyler	Craig B	3:23
12.	"The Man Right Chea"	Tyler	Craig B	3:42
13.	"Dick on the Track"	Tyler	Craig B	4:34
14.	"Sleepin' with Me" (featuring O'Dell)	Tyler	Craig B	4:28
15.	"It Yearns"	Tyler	KLC	4:56
16.	"Gangstas" (featuring Snoop Doggy Dogg and Master P)	Tyler; Calvin Broadus; P. Miller	Craig B; KLC	4:16
17.	"Shine" (featuring O'Dell)	Tyler	KLC	4:19
Total length:				1:09:47

Sample credits

- Track 4 contains a portion of the composition "Sir Nose D'voidoffunk" written by George Clinton, Bernie Worrell and Bootsy Collins
- Track 6 contains a portion of the composition "Out on a Limb" written by Mary Christine Brockert
- Track 9 contains a sample from "Who Got The Clout" written by Mia Young, Michael Tyler and Odell Vickers Jr.
- Track 15 contains samples from "The Champ" written by Harry Palmer and performed by The Mohawks, "It's Yours" written by Rick Rubin as recorded by T La Rock, "Ain't No Half-Steppin'" written by Antonio Hardy and Marlon Williams

== Charts ==
=== Weekly charts ===
Chart (1997)	Peak position
US Billboard 200	3
US Top R&B/Hip-Hop Albums (Billboard)	1

=== Year-end charts ===
Chart (1997)	Position
US Top R&B/Hip-Hop Albums (Billboard)	100

Chart (1998)	Position
US Billboard 200	90
US Top R&B/Hip-Hop Albums (Billboard)	17

== Certifications ==
Certifications for Unpredictable
Region	Certification	Certified units/sales
United States (RIAA)	Platinum	1,000,000^{^}
^{^} Shipments figures based on certification alone.

== See also ==
- List of number-one R&B albums of 1997 (U.S.)
