= Made Man (album) =

Studio album by Silkk The Shocker
- Released: January 19, 1999
- Genres: Southern hip-hop; gangsta rap; G-funk
- Length: 73:03
- Labels: Priority; No Limit
- Producers: Master P (exec.); Beats by the Pound; The Whole 9; Sons of Funk; DJ Whop

Silkk The Shocker chronology
Charge It 2 da Game (1998)	Made Man (1999)	My World, My Way (2001)

Singles from Made Man
- 1. "Somebody Like Me" Released: February 16, 1999; 2. "It Ain't My Fault Pt. 2" Released: February 16, 1999

Professional ratings
Review scores
Source	Rating
AllMusic	2.5/5 stars
Entertainment Weekly	B
Los Angeles Times	1.5/4 stars
USA Today	3/4 stars

Made Man is the third studio album by American rapper Silkk The Shocker, released on January 19, 1999, on Priority Records and Master P's No Limit Records. Production for the album was handled by No Limit producers Beats By the Pound and The Whole 9. The album features guest appearances from Jay-Z, Snoop Dogg, Mýa and Master P, the latter whom executive produced the album.

The album debuted at number one on both the US Billboard 200 and Top R&B/Hip-Hop Albums. On April 12, 1999 Made Man was certified Platinum by the Recording Industry Association of America.

The music video for "Ghetto Rain" was also No Limit's first animated claymation music video.

== Commercial performance ==
It debuted at number one on the US Billboard 200 selling 240,244 copies in its first week making it Silkk the Shocker's Second Platinum album and his first platinum album debuting at number one on the US Billboard 200. It sold more its first week than his previous album Charge It 2 da Game (1998). Made Man went on to be certified Platinum by the Recording Industry Association of America (RIAA) in April 1999. This album made Silkk The Shocker one of the only rappers to go platinum with two albums within a 1 year time span, the other was DMX in 1998.

== Track listing ==
Made Man
No.	Title	Length
1.	"The Day I Was Made"	4:24
2.	"Somebody Like Me" (featuring Mýa)	4:12
3.	"It Ain't My Fault Pt. 2" (featuring Mystikal)	3:26
4.	"Ghetto Rain" (featuring Master P & O'Dell)	4:36
5.	"This Is 4 My" (featuring Short Circuit)	2:51
6.	"Commercial One"	0:39
7.	"You Know What We Bout" (featuring Master P & Jay-Z)	4:33
8.	"I Want to Be with You" (featuring O'Dell)	4:53
9.	"All Because of You" (featuring Mia X)	4:27
10.	"No Limit" (featuring Fiend & Mystikal)	2:21
11.	"End of the Road" (featuring Sons of Funk)	4:21
12.	"We Won't Stop" (featuring Master P & C-Murder)	4:01
13.	"Mr. '99"	3:02
14.	"It Takes More" (featuring Ghetto Commission)	4:00
15.	"If It Don't Make $"	3:10
16.	"It's Going Around Outside" (featuring Rico of Sons of Funk)	4:37
17.	"Put It on Something" (featuring Mia X)	4:49
18.	"Commercial Two" (featuring Fiend & 2-4-1)	1:51
19.	"Southside Niggas" (featuring C-Murder)	3:12
20.	"Get It Up" (featuring Snoop Dogg)	3:38

All lyrics written by Vyshonn "Silkk the Shocker" Miller, and featured rappers.

== Charts ==
=== Weekly charts ===
Chart (1999)	Peak position
US Billboard 200	1
US Top R&B/Hip-Hop Albums (Billboard)	1

=== Year-end charts ===
Chart (1999)	Position
US Billboard 200	95
US Top R&B/Hip-Hop Albums (Billboard)	23

=== Singles ===
Year	Song	Chart positions		
Year	Song	Billboard Hot 100	Hot R&B/Hip-Hop Singles & Tracks	Hot Rap Singles
1999	Somebody Like Me	#112	#43	#1
1999	"It Ain't My Fault Pt. 2"	#18	#5	#1
1999	"Ghetto Rain"	–	–	#6

== Certifications ==
Region	Certification	Certified units/sales
United States (RIAA)	Platinum	1,000,000^{^}
^{^} Shipments figures based on certification alone.

== Personnel ==
Credits adapted from AllMusic

- Craig B. - Producer
- C-Murder - Performer
- Fiend - Performer
- Ghetto Commission - Performer
- Leslie Henderson - Photography
- Jay-Z - CGuest Artist, Performer
- Master P - Guest Artist, Performer
- Mia X - Guest Artist, Performer
- Mýa - Featured Artist, Guest Artist, Primary Artist
- Mystikal - Guest Artist, Performer
- O'Dell - Featured Artist, Performer
- Rico - Featured Artist, Guest Artist, Performer, Primary Artist
- Silkk the Shocker - Performer
- Snoop Dogg - Guest Artist, Performer
- Sons of Funk - Guest Artist, Performer
- Carlos Stephens - Producer

== See also ==
- Number-one albums of 1999 (U.S.)
- List of number-one R&B albums of 1999 (U.S.)
- No Limit Records discography
