= I'm Bout It (soundtrack) =

Soundtrack album to I'm Bout It by No Limit Records
- Released: May 13, 1997
- Genre: Hip-hop
- Length: 1:18:41
- Label: Priority; No Limit
- Producer: Brotha Lynch Hung; Carlos Stephens; C-Loc; CMT; Craig B.; DJ Daryl; E-A-Ski; Goldie Mac; Happy Perez; JT the Bigga Figga; Keke Loco; KLC; K-Lou; Leroy "Precise" Edwards; Mo B. Dick; O'Dell; Sam Bostic; Sons of Funk; The Fast 1

No Limit Records compilations chronology
West Coast Bad Boyz II (1997)	I'm Bout It (1997)	I Got the Hook-Up! (1998)

Professional ratings
Review scores
Source	Rating
AllMusic	4/5 stars
Entertainment Weekly	B−
RapReviews	7/10

I'm Bout It is the soundtrack album to Master P's 1997 comedy drama film of the same name. It was released on May 13, 1997, through No Limit/Priority Records. Production was handled by Beats By The Pound, Brotha Lynch Hung, C-Loc, CMT, DJ Daryl, E-A-Ski, Goldie Mac, Happy Perez, JT the Bigga Figga, Keke Loco, K-Lou, Leroy "Precise" Edwards, Sam Bostic, and the Fast 1. It features contributions from Master P, C-Loc, 8Ball & MJG, B-Legit, Brotha Lynch Hung, C-Murder, E-40, E-A-Ski, Fiend, Gambino Family, Ghetto Twiinz, JT the Bigga Figga, Kane & Abel, Mac, Mercedes, Mia X, Mo B. Dick, Mr. Jinks, Mr. Serv-On, Mystikal, Prime Suspects, Silkk the Shocker, Skull Duggery, Sons of Funk, Steady Mobb'n, The Fast 1, UGK and Young Bleed.

== Commercial and chart performance ==
The soundtrack was a success, peaking at number 4 on the Billboard 200 chart and atop the Top R&B/Hip-Hop Albums, becoming No Limit's first number-one album, with first-week sales of 300,000 units. In addition, the single "If I Could Change" rose to number 60 on the Billboard Hot 100, number 27 on the Hot R&B/Hip-Hop Singles & Tracks, and number 5 on the Hot Rap Singles; another single "Pushin' Inside You" made it to number 70 on the Billboard Hot 100.

== Track listing ==
No.	Title	Writer(s)	Producer(s)	Length
1.	"Intro"			0:24
2.	"Meal Ticket"	Master P; 8Ball; MJG; UGK	Mo B. Dick	4:03
3.	"Situation on Dirty"	Brotha Lynch Hung	Brotha Lynch Hung	3:22
4.	"What Cha Think"	Mystikal	KLC	4:11
5.	"Come On"	E-40; B-Legit	Sam Bostic	4:10
6.	"How Ya Do Dat"	Master P; Young Bleed; C-Loc	Happy Perez; KLC; Craig B.	4:29
7.	"Don't Mess Around"	Fiend	KLC	4:11
8.	"If I Could Change"	Master P; Steady Mobb'n	DJ Daryl	4:12
9.	"Faces of Death"	E-A-Ski	E-A-Ski; CMT	3:01
10.	"Down and Dirty"	Silkk the Shocker; C-Murder; Mercedes	Ken "K-Lou" Franklin	3:50
11.	"Much Love"	Mia X	Craig B.	4:02
12.	"Pushin' Inside You"	Sons of Funk	Sons of Funk	3:47
13.	"Before I Die"	Mr. Serv-On	Craig B.	2:59
14.	"For Realz"	Kane & Abel	KLC	2:35
15.	"Lock Down"	Mac	Mo B. Dick	2:49
16.	"Heat"	Skull Duggery	Carlos Stephens	2:37
17.	"Murder Murder"	Ghetto Twiinz	Leroy "Precise" Edwards	3:11
18.	"Ride 4U"	L. Holden; C. Key	Goldie Mac; Keke Loco	2:42
19.	"That Thing Is On"	Mo B. Dick	Mo B. Dick	4:10
20.	"Who's Who"	C-Loc	C-Loc	3:21
21.	"Cops Runnin' After Ya"	Prime Suspects	KLC	3:40
22.	"Game Tight"	JT the Bigga Figga; The Fast One	The Fast One; JT the Bigga Figga	3:10
23.	"Why They Wanna See Me Dead"	Gambino Family	O'Dell	3:17
Total length:				1:18:41

== Charts ==
=== Weekly charts ===
Chart (1997)	Peak position
US Billboard 200	4
US Top R&B/Hip-Hop Albums (Billboard)	1

=== Year-end charts ===
Chart (1997)	Position
US Billboard 200	93
US Top R&B/Hip-Hop Albums (Billboard)	19

== Certifications ==
Region	Certification	Certified units/sales
United States (RIAA)	Platinum	1,000,000^{^}
United States (RIAA) Video	2× Platinum	200,000^{^}
^{^} Shipments figures based on certification alone.

== See also ==
- List of Billboard number-one R&B albums of 1997
