= Mama Drama (album) =

Studio album by Mia X
- Released: October 27, 1998
- Recorded: 1997–1998
- Length: 77:24
- Label: No Limit; Priority; EMI
- Producer: Master P, Beats By the Pound

Mia X chronology
Unlady Like (1997)	Mama Drama (1998)

Singles from Mama Drama
- 1. "What'cha Wanna Do" Released: May 12, 1998; 2. "Imma Shine" Released: September 2, 1998

Mama Drama is the third and final studio album released by American rapper Mia X, which was released on October 27, 1998, on No Limit Records, distributed by Priority Records and EMI, and featured production from Master P and Beats By the Pound. Many of the guests who appeared on the previous album returned for guest appearances on the album including Fat Joe and Charlie Wilson. Mama Drama debuted at numbers three and seven on both the Billboard 200 and Top R&B/Hip-Hop Albums charts respectively. It spawned two singles: "What'cha Wanna Do" and "Imma Shine". The album has since sold over 1,000,000 copies.

== Background and singles ==
Mama Drama was Mia X's most successful album commercially and critically, charting at number seven on the Billboard 200 and number three on the Top R&B/Hip-Hop Albums charts. The first single, "What'cha Wanna Do", found success, reaching number 41 on the Billboard Hot 100, number four on the Hot Rap Tracks and number 32 on the Hot R&B/Hip-Hop Singles & Tracks. The second single was "Imma Shine".

== Critical reception ==
Professional ratings
Review scores
Source	Rating
AllMusic	3/5 stars
Entertainment Weekly	B
Los Angeles Times	3/4 stars
Robert Christgau	(choice cut)
Rolling Stone	2.5/5 stars

Soren Baker of the Los Angeles Times praised Beats By the Pound's "catchy, dance-inducing production" for elevating Mia X's "intense delivery", saying she "finds the delicate balance between sensationalized boasts and a more gentle, feminine approach." AllMusic's Stephen Thomas Erlewine was critical of the album's "utterly flat production" obscuring Mia X's rapping abilities and making her a "No Limit variation" of Foxy Brown and Lil' Kim, but felt that the record's collaborations with her fellow No Limit roster was "reason enough for die-hard No Limit heads to check this out, even if it won't convince any doubters." Rob Brunner of Entertainment Weekly felt that No Limit's records were plagued with "mediocre filler" throughout the track listing, adding that: "Mia X's Mama Drama — an exciting combination of abrasive, chaotic production and big-voiced boasting — could have been the first to avoid this problem. So why make it 20 songs when 10 would've sufficed?" Robert Christgau cited "Puttin' It Down" and "Daddy" as "choice cuts" on his Consumer Guide, indicating good songs on "an album that isn't worth your time or money." In his review for Rolling Stone, Christgau was critical of Mia X trading Unlady Like's "silly but audaciously gender-bent mackstress routines" for "cliched-to-death claims of gun-slinging battle prowess", and felt that her content goes adrift through "endless songs about thug services rendered."

== Track listing ==
No.	Title	Producer(s)	Length
1.	"Bring It On" (featuring Fiend, Mac, Skull Duggery, C-Murder and Mystikal)	KLC	5:10
2.	"What'cha Wanna Do" (featuring Charlie Wilson)	KLC and Craig B	4:40
3.	"Don't Start No Shit" (featuring Master P and C-Murder)	Craig B	3:55
4.	"Mama Drama" (featuring Fiend)	KLC	2:56
5.	"Imma Shine" (featuring O'Dell)	Craig B	4:03
6.	"I Think Somebody" (featuring Fiend)	KLC	3:03
7.	"Mama's Tribute"	KLC	3:59
8.	"What's Ya Point" (featuring Fat Joe and Snoop Dogg)	Craig B	4:19
9.	"Thugs Like Me"	KLC	3:57
10.	"Ride or Run" (featuring Big Ed and Steady Mobb'n)	Carlos	3:20
11.	"Tru Bitches"	Craig B	3:07
12.	"Puttin' It Down" (featuring Fiend, Mystikal, Mac and Kane & Abel)	KLC	3:55
13.	"Ghetto Livin'" (featuring Ghetto Commission and O'Dell)	Carlos	4:03
14.	"Play Wit Pussy" (featuring Fiend)	KLC	3:47
15.	"Don't Blame Me" (C-Murder and Mr. Serv-On)	Carlos	4:08
16.	"Daddy"	O'Dell	4:12
17.	"Like Dat"	Craig B	3:58
18.	"Sex Ed." (featuring Silkk the Shocker)	O'Dell	4:44
19.	"Flip & Rip" (featuring Mac)	KLC	3:18
20.	"Fallen Angels (Dear Jil)"	O'Dell	3:10

== Credits and personnel ==
- Mia X – vocals, rapping
- Craig B. – producer
- Big Ed – guest artist, performer, primary artist
- Big Man – vocals
- Boz – vocals
- Carlos – producer
- C-Murder composer, guest artist, performer, primary artist
- Byron Dollioli – primary artist
- Fat Joe – guest artist, performer, primary artist
- Fiend – featured artist, guest artist, performer, primary artist
- Ghetto Commission – guest artist, performer, primary artist
- Leslie Henderson – photography
- K Lou – bass
- Kane & Abel -performer, primary artist
- KLC – producer
- M.A.C. – guest artist, primary artist
- Mac – primary artist
- Larry Mac – composer
- Master P – executive producer, guest artist, performer, primary artist
- Mr. Serv-On – guest artist, performer, primary artist
- Mystikal – featured artist, guest artist, performer, primary artist
- O'Dell – primary artist, producer, vocals
- Porsha – vocals
- Oliver Scott – composer
- Carol Sheridan – photography
- Silkk the Shocker – guest artist, primary artist, vocals
- Skull Duggery – performer, primary artist
- Snoop Dogg – composer, guest artist, performer, primary artist
- Steady Mobb'n – composer, performer, primary artist
- Anita Thomas – vocals
- Mark Trentecosta – guitar
- Wendy Weary – primary artist, vocals
- Ronnie Wilson – composer

== Charts ==
=== Weekly charts ===
Chart (1998)	Peak position
US Billboard 200	7
US Top R&B/Hip-Hop Albums (Billboard)	3

=== Year-end charts ===
Chart (1999)	Position
US Top R&B/Hip-Hop Albums (Billboard)	100
