= My World, My Way (album) =

Studio album by Silkk the Shocker
- Released: February 27, 2001
- Recorded: 2000
- Genres: Southern hip-hop; gangsta rap
- Length: 1:13:31
- Labels: No Limit; Priority
- Producers: Carlos Stephens; D; DJ Ron; Ezell Swang; Ke'Noe; Myke Diesel; Soopafly; Suga Bear; The Neptunes; XL

Silkk the Shocker chronology
Made Man (1999)	My World, My Way (2001)	Based on a True Story (2004)

Singles from My World, My Way
- 1. "He Did That" Released: September 5, 2000; 2. "Pop Lockin'" Released: 2000; 3. "That's Cool" Released: January 30, 2001

Professional ratings
Aggregate scores
Source	Rating
Metacritic	63/100
Review scores
Source	Rating
AllMusic	2.5/5 stars
Entertainment Weekly	C+
Los Angeles Times	3/4 stars
RapReviews	5.5/10
The Source	3.5/5 stars
USA Today	2.5/4 stars
Vibe	3/5 stars

My World, My Way is the fourth solo studio album by American rapper Silkk the Shocker. It was released on February 27, 2001, through No Limit/Priority Records. Production was handled by The Neptunes, Soopafly, Carlos Stephens, Myke Diesel, DJ Ron, Suga Bear, XL, D, Ezell Swang and Ke'Noe . It features guest appearances from Trina, Snoop Dogg and Goldie Loc as well as contributions by fellow No Limit labelmates and affiliates, such as Master P, Mystikal, C-Murder, Terror, Mac, Erica Foxx, Krazy, Short Circuit, Slay Sean and Samm. In the United States, the album reached number 12 on the Billboard 200 and number 3 on the Top R&B/Hip-Hop Albums charts. It spawned three singles: "He Did That", "Pop Lockin'" and "That's Cool", which were minor success peaking at No. 50, 64 and 51, respectivelly, on the US Hot R&B/Hip-Hop Songs chart.

== Track listing ==
No.	Title	Writer(s)	Producer(s)	Length
1.	"Intro"	Vyshonn King Miller; Michael Shawn Robinson	Myke Diesel	1:26
2.	"Na Na Na"	V. Miller	Myke Diesel	1:34
3.	"Run"	V. Miller	Myke Diesel; D	3:42
4.	"He Did That"	V. Miller; Percy Miller; McKinley Phipps	XL	3:24
5.	"That's Cool" (featuring Trina)	V. Miller; Katrina Taylor	Myke Diesel	3:42
6.	"Pop Lockin'" (featuring Snoop Dogg and Goldie Loc)	V. Miller; Calvin Broadus; Keiwan Spillman	Soopafly	4:54
7.	"Uh Ha"	V. Miller; Sean Michael Cunningham	Carlos Stephens; Suga Bear; Ezell Swang; Myke Diesel	4:08
8.	"Funny Guy"	V. Miller	Myke Diesel; Suga Bear	3:33
9.	"Interlude 1"	Robinson	Myke Diesel	0:57
10.	"Haters"	V. Miller; Samuel Johnson	Myke Diesel	2:42
11.	"Interlude 2"	V. Miller	Carlos Stephens; Myke Diesel	1:10
12.	"Seem Like a Thug"	V. Miller; Erica Fox	Carlos Stephens	3:01
13.	"Them Boyz"	V. Miller; Michael Tyler	Carlos Stephens	2:39
14.	"My World, My Way"	V. Miller	Myke Diesel	3:54
15.	"Go Down"	V. Miller; P. Miller; Fox	Myke Diesel	3:29
16.	"Beef"	V. Miller; Corey Miller; Michael Wilson	Ke-Noe	3:08
17.	"What's Heaven Like"	V. Miller	XL	4:00
18.	"I Wish"	V. Miller; P. Miller; Broadus	Myke Diesel	3:48
19.	"D-Game Remix"	V. Miller; P. Miller; Wilson; Terrence Thornton	Carlos Stephens; The Neptunes	4:05
20.	"What I'm Looking For"	V. Miller	Myke Diesel	3:38
21.	"Executive Thug"	V. Miller; Clinton Wright; Cunningham	Myke Diesel	3:08
22.	"What You Know"	V. Miller; Wright	DJ Ron	2:34
23.	"The Day After"	V. Miller	DJ Ron	4:48
Total length:				1:13:31

== Personnel ==
- Vyshonn "Silkk the Shocker" Miller – songwriter (tracks: 1-8, 10-23)
- Percy "Master P" Miller – songwriter (tracks: 4, 15, 18, 19), executive producer
- McKinley "Mac" Phipps Jr. – songwriter (track 4)
- Katrina "Trina" Taylor – songwriter (track 5)
- Calvin "Snoop Dogg" Broadus – songwriter (tracks: 6, 18)
- Keiwan "Goldie Loc" Spillman – songwriter (track 6)
- "Slay Sean" Michael Cunningham – songwriter (tracks: 7, 21)
- Samuel "Samm" Johnson – songwriter (track 10)
- Erica Fox – songwriter (tracks: 12, 15)
- Michael "Mystikal" Tyler – songwriter (track 13)
- Corey "C-Murder" Miller – songwriter (track 16)
- Michael "Krazy" Wilson – songwriter (tracks: 16, 19)
- Terrence "Terror" Thornton – songwriter (track 19)
- Clinton "Short Circuit" Wright – songwriter (tracks: 21, 22)
- Michael "Myke Diesel" Robinson – songwriter (tracks: 1, 9), producer (tracks: 1-3, 5, 7-11, 14, 15, 18, 20, 21)
- Cornell "Suga Bear" Perkins – additional vocals (track 16), producer (tracks: 7, 8)
- D – producer (track 3)
- Donald "XL" Robertson – producer (tracks: 4, 17)
- Priest "Soopafly" Brooks – producer (track 6)
- Carlos "C-Los" Stephens – producer (tracks: 7, 11-13, 19)
- Renee Alfred "Ezell Swang" – producer (track 7)
- Maurice "Ke'Noe" Jordan – producer (track 16)
- DJ Ron Ward – producer (tracks: 22, 23)
- Jodi Cohen – design, layout
- Michael Miller – photography
- Leslie Henderson – photography
- Carol Sheridan – photography
- Pen & Pixel – front cover artwork

== Charts ==
=== Weekly charts ===
Chart (2001)	Peak position
US Billboard 200	12
US Top R&B/Hip-Hop Albums (Billboard)	3

=== Year-end charts ===
Chart (2001)	Position
US Top R&B/Hip-Hop Albums (Billboard)	86
