= Based on a True Story (Silkk the Shocker album) =

Studio album by Silkk the Shocker
- Released: September 7, 2004
- Recorded: 2004
- Genre: Hip-hop
- Length: 52:49
- Labels: The New No Limit; Koch
- Producers: Myke Diesel; Serious; XL

Silkk the Shocker chronology
My World, My Way (2001)	Based on a True Story (2004)	It Will All Make Sense Later (2018)

Singles from Based on a True Story
- 1. "We Like Them Girls" Released: August 10, 2004

Professional ratings
Review scores
Source	Rating
AllMusic	3/5 stars
RapReviews	4.5/10
Vibe	3/5 stars

Based on a True Story is the fifth solo studio album by American rapper Silkk the Shocker. It was released on September 7, 2004, via The New No Limit/Koch Records. Production was handled by Myke Diesel, Donald "XL" Robertson and Serious. It features guest appearances from Master P, Petey Pablo, Curren$y, Germany, Motor Bike Mike and Pop. The album peaked at number 88 on the Billboard 200, number 22 on the Top R&B/Hip-Hop Albums, number 13 on the Top Rap Albums and number 7 on the Independent Albums charts in the United States. The album's lead single "We Like Them Girls" made it to number 69 on the Hot R&B/Hip-Hop Songs and number 15 on the Hot Rap Songs charts.

== Track listing ==
No.	Title	Producer(s)	Length
1.	"We Like Them Girls" (featuring Petey Pablo and Master P)	Myke Diesel	3:04
2.	"Got It on Lock" (featuring Master P and Pop)	Myke Diesel	4:00
3.	"We Don't Dance We Bounce" (featuring Master P)	Myke Diesel	4:23
4.	"Just Do It" (featuring Curren$y)	Myke Diesel	4:02
5.	"Why You Mad"	Myke Diesel	2:22
6.	"We Like Them Girls" (featuring Master P)	Myke Diesel	3:03
7.	"Playa Playa"	Myke Diesel	3:26
8.	"Holla (Skit)" (featuring Germany)		0:29
9.	"Be There"	XL	3:55
10.	"That's Just Me"	Myke Diesel	3:11
11.	"Hey You"	Serious	3:16
12.	"Do the Thing"	Myke Diesel	3:26
13.	"Get That"	Myke Diesel	6:08
14.	"The Hunta (Skit)" (featuring Motor Bike Mike)		1:32
15.	"Clap" (featuring Master P)	Myke Diesel	2:40
16.	"Forgive Me"	Myke Diesel	3:52
Total length:			52:49

== Charts ==
Chart (2004)	Peak position
US Billboard 200	88
US Top R&B/Hip-Hop Albums (Billboard)	22
US Top Rap Albums (Billboard)	13
US Independent Albums (Billboard)	7
