= MP da Last Don =

Studio album by Master P
- Released: June 2, 1998
- Genres: Southern hip-hop; gangsta rap; G-funk
- Length: 106:06
- Labels: Priority; No Limit
- Producers: Master P (also exec.); Beats by the Pound; DJ Darryl

Master P chronology
Ghetto D (1997)	MP da Last Don (1998)	Only God Can Judge Me (1999)

Singles from MP da Last Don
- 1. "Thinkin' Bout U" Released: July 7, 1998; 2. "Goodbye to My Homies" Released: 1998; 3. "Hot Boys and Girls" Released: January 2, 1999

Professional ratings
Review scores
Source	Rating
AllMusic	2.5/5 stars
Pitchfork	8.0/10
Rolling Stone	4/5 stars
The Source	4/5 stars
The Village Voice	C+

MP da Last Don is the seventh studio album by American rapper Master P. It was released by Priority Records and Master P's No Limit Records. It features guest appearances by Bone Thugs-n-Harmony, E-40, C-Murder, Silkk the Shocker, UGK, Snoop Dogg, Soulja Slim, Mystikal, Fiend, and Soulja Slim.

The album gained mixed reviews. It was also released about the same time as the straight-to-video short film, MP da Last Don. It was promoted as his final studio album, although Master P returned to solo recording with Only God Can Judge Me in 1999.

== Commercial performance ==
MP da Last Don originally debuted at number 112 on the Billboard 200 chart as several stores sold the album before its official release, but then peaked at number one on the Billboard 200 and Top R&B/Hip-Hop Albums chart, selling 496,000 copies in the first official week. The album sold 217,000 copies in its second week and remained at #1 on both charts. The album was ultimately certified quadruple platinum by the RIAA for selling over 4.5 million copies, making it the best selling album for both Master P and No Limit.

== Background ==
The album was originally marketed as Master P's retirement album, but he returned a year later with his eighth album, Only God Can Judge Me. It sold four million copies in the U.S. make it one of the best selling albums of his career. The movie, MP da Last Don, was released on DVD on December 31, 1998.

== Track listing ==
Disc 1
No.	Title	Length
1.	"Da Last Don"	3:36
2.	"Till We Dead and Gone" (featuring Bone Thugs-N-Harmony)	5:18
3.	"Thinkin' Bout U" (featuring Mia X and Mo B. Dick)	3:46
4.	"Soldiers, Riders & G's" (featuring Silkk the Shocker, Mystikal and Snoop Dogg)	4:34
5.	"The Ghetto's Got Me Trapped" (featuring Silkk the Shocker and Sons of Funk)	2:35
6.	"Get Your Paper" (featuring E-40)	4:44
7.	"Ride"	4:06
8.	"Thug Girl" (featuring Silkk the Shocker and Snoop Dogg)	3:13
9.	"These Streets Keep Me Rollin'" (featuring Fiend)	3:07
10.	"Black and White" (featuring Fiend and Silkk the Shocker)	4:45
11.	"War Wounds" (featuring Fiend, Silkk the Shocker, Mystikal and Snoop Dogg)	4:22
12.	"Dear Mr. President" (featuring Mac)	4:13
13.	"Mama Raised Me" (featuring Snoop Dogg and Soulja Slim)	3:11
14.	"Let My 9 Get 'Em"	3:20

Disc 2
No.	Title	Length
1.	"More 2 Life" (featuring C-Murder)	3:43
2.	"Ghetto Life" (featuring UGK, O'Dell and Mo B. Dick)	4:54
3.	"Gangsta B..." (featuring Steady Mobb'n)	3:50
4.	"So Many Souls Deceased" (featuring Ghetto Commission)	4:23
5.	"Rock-A-Bye Haters"	0:23
6.	"Snitches" (featuring Snoop Dogg)	4:08
7.	"Family Business"	0:28
8.	"Let's Get 'Em" (featuring C-Murder and Magic)	4:14
9.	"Goodbye to My Homies" (featuring Silkk the Shocker, Sons of Funk and Mo B. Dick)	4:12
10.	"Welcome to My City" (featuring Mac and O'Dell)	3:25
11.	"Ghetto Love" (featuring Mia X and Mo B. Dick)	3:35
12.	"Make 'Em Say Uhh 2" (featuring Fiend, Silkk the Shocker, Mia X and Snoop Dogg)	4:28
13.	"Hot Boys and Girls" (featuring Mystikal, Silkk the Shocker, Mia X and Kane & Abel)	5:24
14.	"Reverse the Game"	0:31
15.	"Eternity" (featuring C-Murder and Mr. Serv-On)	4:11

== Samples ==
- "Black and White"
  - "A Love of Your Own" by Average White Band
- "Da Last Don"
  - "Smooth Criminal" by Michael Jackson
- "Gangsta B****"
  - "Love Hangover" by Diana Ross
- "Ghetto Love"
  - "Portrait of Tracy" by Jaco Pastorius
  - "Rain by SWV
- "Rock-a-bye Haters"
  - "Rock-a-bye Baby" by Traditional Folk
- "Snitches"
  - "Haboglabotribin'" by Bernard Wright
- "Thinkin' Bout U"
  - "Thinkin' About Ya" by Timex Social Club
- "Thug Girl"
  - "Dumb Girl" by Run-DMC
  - "Criminal Minded" by Boogie Down Productions

== Charts ==
=== Weekly charts ===
Chart (1998)	Peak position
New Zealand Albums (RMNZ)	50
US Billboard 200	1
US Top R&B/Hip-Hop Albums (Billboard)	1

=== Year-end charts ===
Chart (1998)	Position
US Billboard 200	31
US Top R&B/Hip-Hop Albums (Billboard)	7

=== Singles ===
Goodbye to My Homies

Chart	Position
Billboard Hot 100	27
Hot Rap Singles	5
Hot R&B/Hip-Hop Singles & Tracks	38

Hot Boys and Girls

Chart	Position
Hot R&B/Hip-Hop Singles & Tracks	87

== Certifications ==
Region	Certification	Certified units/sales
Canada (Music Canada)	Gold	50,000^{^}
United States (RIAA)	4× Platinum	4,000,000^{^}
^{^} Shipments figures based on certification alone.

== See also ==
- List of Billboard 200 number-one albums of 1998
- List of Billboard number-one R&B albums of 1998
