= Charge It 2 da Game =

Studio album by Silkk the Shocker
- Released: February 17, 1998
- Genres: Southern hip-hop; gangsta rap; hardcore hip-hop
- Length: 77:39
- Labels: No Limit; Priority
- Producers: Master P (exec.); Beats by the Pound

Silkk the Shocker chronology
The Shocker (1996)	Charge It 2 da Game (1998)	Made Man (1999)

Singles from Charge It 2 Da Game
- 1. "Just Be Straight with Me" Released: January 23, 1998; 2. "It Ain't My Fault" Released: August 8, 1998

Professional ratings
Review scores
Source	Rating
AllMusic	3/5 stars
Los Angeles Times	3/4 stars
Rolling Stone	3/5 stars
The Source	3.5/5 stars
The Village Voice	(dud)

Charge It 2 da Game is the second studio album by American rapper Silkk the Shocker, released on February 17, 1998, on No Limit Records. The album features guest appearances from Destiny's Child, Mystikal, Snoop Doggy Dogg, 8Ball, Mia X, C-Murder and Master P. The album was produced by Beats by the Pound. Two charting singles were released from the album: "Just Be Straight with Me", featuring Master P and Destiny's Child, and "It Ain't My Fault", featuring Mystikal.

Charge It 2 da Game debuted at #3 on the U.S. Billboard 200 and #1 on the Top R&B/Hip-Hop Albums selling 245,000 copies in its 1st week. It was certified platinum by the RIAA on March 25, 1998.

== Track listing ==
No.	Title	Producer(s)	Length
1.	"I'm a Soldier (featuring Master P, C-Murder, Fiend, Mystikal, Mac, Big Ed, Mia X, Lil Gotti & Skull Duggery)"	KLC	5:09
2.	"Give Me the World"	O'Dell	3:03
3.	"Throw Yo Hood Up (featuring Snoop Doggy Dogg)"	O'Dell; KLC	5:09
4.	"Just Be Straight With Me (featuring Master P, Destiny's Child, Mo B. Dick & O'Dell)"	Craig B	4:21
5.	"If I Don't Gotta (featuring Fiend)"	Mo B. Dick	5:24
6.	"Spotaggin (Skit)"	Craig B.	0:23
7.	"We Can Dance"	Mo B. Dick	5:18
8.	"Mama Always Told Me (featuring Master P, C-Murder & 8Ball)"	Craig B.	4:39
9.	"You Ain't Gotta Lie to Kick It (featuring Mia X & Big Ed)"	O'Dell	5:03
10.	"Thug 'N' Me (featuring Master P, Mo B. Dick, Ms. Peaches & O'Dell)"	O'Dell	4:48
11.	"All Night (featuring Mo B. Dick)"	Mo B. Dick	4:02
12.	"Who Can I Trust?"	Carlos Stephens	3:35
13.	"It Ain't My Fault (featuring Mystikal)"	Craig B.	3:19
14.	"What Gangstas Do (featuring Kane & Abel & Mo B. Dick)"	Mo B. Dick	3:56
15.	"Ummm (Skit)"	Mo B. Dick	1:02
16.	"Let Me Hit It (featuring Mystikal)"	KLC	2:42
17.	"How Many? (featuring Master P, C-Murder, Mia X & Mystikal)"	Mo B. Dick	4:12
18.	"Who I Be?"	Craig B.	3:40
19.	"Tell Me (featuring Master P & C-Murder)"	Carlos Stephens	4:29
20.	"Me And You"	Craig B.	3:25

=== Personnel ===
- Pen & Pixel - Cover art

== Charts ==
=== Weekly charts ===
Chart (1998)	Peak position
US Billboard 200	3
US Top R&B/Hip-Hop Albums (Billboard)	1

=== Year-end charts ===
Chart (1998)	Position
US Billboard 200	49
US Top R&B/Hip-Hop Albums (Billboard)	8

== Certifications ==
Region	Certification	Certified units/sales
United States (RIAA)	Platinum	1,000,000^{^}
^{^} Shipments figures based on certification alone.

== See also ==
- List of number-one R&B albums of 1998 (U.S.)
