= It Ain't My Fault (Silkk the Shocker song) =

Single by Silkk the Shocker featuring Mystikal

from the album Charge It 2 da Game
- Released: 1998
- Recorded: 1997
- Genre: jazz rap; gangsta rap
- Length: 3:19
- Label: No Limit; Priority
- Songwriters: Wardell Quezergue, Craig Bazile, Joseph "Smokey" Johnson, Vyshonne Miller
- Producers: Master P (exec.); Craig B. (exec.)

Silkk the Shocker singles chronology
"Let's Ride" (1998)	"It Ain't My Fault" (1998)	"Movin' On" (1998)

Mystikal singles chronology
"Make 'Em Say Uhh!" (1998)	"It Ain't My Fault" (1998)	"Woof" (1998)

"It Ain't My Fault" is the second single released from rapper Silkk the Shocker's second album, Charge It 2 da Game. Produced by Craig B., the song features a verse and chorus from label-mate Mystikal and samples the New Orleans jazz standard "It Ain't My Fault" written by Smokey Johnson and Wardell Quezergue. "It Ain't My Fault" was one of Silkk the Shocker's successful singles, making it to 18 on the Billboard Hot 100.

== Production and release ==
The chorus of "It Ain't My Fault" samples the jazz song "It Ain't My Fault", which was written by Smokey Johnson and Wardell Quezergue in 1964. Introduced by Harold Dejan's Olympia Brass Band into the contemporary New Orleans brass band repertory, Johnson's and Quezergue's "It Ain't My Fault" has become a standard, recorded by the Treme Brass Band, the Preservation Hall Jazz Band and many others.

== Critical reception ==
Soren Baker of the Los Angeles Times said about the "Part 2" version: "...Mystikal easily outperforms Silkk, who tries in vain to keep pace with his hyperactive label-mate."

== Other versions ==
"It Ain't My Fault, Pt. 2," a remixed version of the track with the intonation, "Did I do that?" recalling Steve Urkel's famous catchphrase, later appeared on Silkk's third album, Made Man and was released as a single in 1999.

The chorus was re-interpreted in a charity song with the same name by Mos Def, Lenny Kravitz, Trombone Shorty, Tim Robbins, and the Preservation Hall Band to benefit Gulf Aid, a nonprofit created in response to the BP oil spill off the Louisiana Coast.

Mariah Carey recorded a reworked version of the song titled "Did I Do That?" for her 1999 album Rainbow.

== Charts ==
Chart (1998–99)	Peak Position
U.S. Billboard Hot 100	18
U.S. Billboard Hot R&B/Hip-Hop Singles & Tracks	5
U.S. Billboard Hot Rap Singles	1
