= Ghetto D =

Studio album by Master P
- Released: September 2, 1997
- Recorded: March 1997
- Genre: Southern hip-hop; gangsta rap; trap
- Length: 79:28
- Label: No Limit; Priority
- Producer: Master P (exec.); Beats by the Pound; Randy Jefferson; K-Lou; Dez

Master P chronology
Ice Cream Man (1996)	Ghetto D (1997)	MP da Last Don (1998)

Singles from Ghetto D
- 1. "I Miss My Homies" Released: August 19, 1997; 2. "Make 'Em Say Uhh!" Released: January 1998

Professional ratings
Review scores
Source	Rating
AllMusic	4.5/5 stars
Entertainment Weekly	B
RapReviews	7.5/10
The Source	4/5 stars
The Village Voice	C+

Ghetto D is the sixth studio album by American rapper Master P, released on September 2, 1997 on No Limit Records and Priority Records.

== Chart performance ==
The album debuted at #137 on the Billboard 200. In its second week the album then moved to #1 on the Billboard 200 and Top R&B/Hip-Hop Albums selling 726,000 copies in its second week. It was mainly on the strength of the two singles released; "I Miss My Homies" (US #25), "Make 'Em Say Uhh!" (US #22) became hit singles in the years 1997 and 1998. "Gangstas Need Love" samples Diana Ross's hit single "Missing You", while "I Miss My Homies" samples The O'Jays' song "Brandy" from the album So Full of Love. In 2008 "Make 'Em Say Uhh!" it ranked #26 on VH1's 100 Greatest Songs of Hip Hop. It ranked at #36 on Blender's list of the "50 Worst Songs Ever" In 2008, it ranked #94 on VH1's 100 Greatest Songs of Hip Hop. "Here We Go", featuring Fiend and Mystikal, was a b-side, released on the "I Miss My Homies" single. Though not a single, there was a video for the song Ghetto D that was aired on November 23, 1997, on both MTV & BET. The album was certified 3× Platinum on August 4, 2006, with 3,185,221 copies sold, according to SoundScan. But according to the No Limit Chronicles on BETunsound scan copies sold were at 6 million copies sold in the United States and over 10 million copies worldwide.

== Track listing ==
No.	Title	Length
1.	"Ghetto D" (featuring C-Murder & Silkk The Shocker)	4:37
2.	"Let's Get Em" (featuring Mystikal, Silkk The Shocker)	5:46
3.	"I Miss My Homies" (featuring Pimp-C, Silkk The Shocker, Mo B. Dick, O'Dell, Sons of Funk)	5:25
4.	"We Riders" (featuring Mac)	3:58
5.	"Throw 'Em Up" (featuring Kane & Abel)	3:22
6.	"Tryin' 2 Do Something" (featuring Fiend, Mac, Mo B. Dick)	3:24
7.	"Plan B" (featuring Mia X)	3:50
8.	"Weed & Money" (featuring Silkk The Shocker)	4:04
9.	"Captain Kirk" (featuring Fiend, Silkk The Shocker, Mystikal)	5:05
10.	"Stop Hatin'" (featuring Fiend, Silkk The Shocker, Mo B. Dick, O'Dell)	5:04
11.	"Eyes On Your Enemies" (featuring Silkk The Shocker, Mia X, Mo B. Dick, O'Dell)	3:29
12.	"Make 'Em Say Uhh!" (featuring Fiend, Silkk The Shocker, Mia X, Mystikal)	5:06
13.	"Going Through Somethangs" (featuring Big Ed, Mr. Serv-On)	4:41
14.	"Only Time Will Tell" (featuring Mac, Sons of Funk)	4:08
15.	"After Dollars, No Cents" (featuring Silkk The Shocker)	3:34
16.	"Gangstas Need Love" (featuring Silkk The Shocker, Mercedes & Lawand)	4:07
17.	"Pass Me da Green"	3:05
18.	"Come and Get Some" (featuring C-Murder, Prime Suspects)	2:31
19.	"Burbons and Lacs" (featuring Silkk The Shocker, Lil Gotti & Mo B. Dick)	4:09

10th Anniversary Edition Bonus Tracks (2007)

1. Weed & Hennessy (feat. C-Murder & Silkk the Shocker)
2. Scream (featuring Silkk the Shocker)
3. Playa 4 Life (feat. Rappin' 4-Tay)
4. Make 'Em Say Ugh! (Instrumental)

== Samples ==
- "Bourbons and Lacs"
  - "Let’s Get It On" by Marvin Gaye
- "Gangstas Need Love"
  - "Missing You" by Diana Ross
- "Ghetto D"
  - "Eric B. Is President" by Eric B. & Rakim
- "I Miss My Homies"
  - "Brandy" by The O'Jays
- "Make Em' Say Uhh!"
  - "Apache" by Sugarhill Gang
  - "Funkbox Party" by The Masterdon Committee
- Pass Me da Green
  - "Intro and Main Title" by Fred Myrow and Malcolm Seagrave
- "Stop Hatin'"
  - "Rumors" by Timex Social Club
- "Tryin' 2 Do Something"
  - "For the Love of You (Part 1 & 2)" by The Isley Brothers

== Charts ==
=== Weekly charts ===
Chart (1997)	Peak position
US Billboard 200	1
US Top R&B/Hip-Hop Albums (Billboard)	1

=== Year-end charts ===
Chart (1997)	Position
US Billboard 200	50
US Top R&B/Hip-Hop Albums (Billboard)	13

Chart (1998)	Position
US Billboard 200	47
US Top R&B/Hip-Hop Albums (Billboard)	27

=== Singles ===
I Miss My Homies

Chart	Position
Hot R&B/Hip-Hop Singles & Tracks	16
Hot Rap Singles	1
Billboard Hot 100	25

Make Em Say Uhh

Chart	Position
Hot Rap Singles	6
Hot Dance Music/Maxi SIngles Sales	3
Hot R&B/Hip-Hop Singles & Tracks	18
Rhythmic Top 40	32
Billboard Hot 100	16

== Certifications ==
Region	Certification	Certified units/sales
United States (RIAA)	3× Platinum	3,000,000^{^}
^{^} Shipments figures based on certification alone.

== See also ==
- List of Billboard 200 number-one albums of 1997
- List of Billboard number-one R&B albums of 1997
