= Mia X =

American singer-songwriter

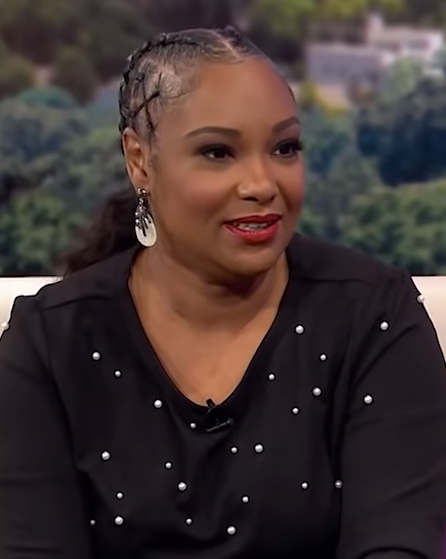
- Mia X in 2019

Background information
- Also known as: The Mother of Southern Rap, Mama Mia Betty Rocka Queen Of The South
- Born: Mia Young; January 9, 1970 (age 56); New Orleans, Louisiana, U.S.
- Genre: Hip hop
- Occupations: Rapper; songwriter
- Years active: 1984–1999; 2008–present
- Labels: Mama Mia Muzik; XLP Distribution (current); No Limit; Priority; EMI (former)

Mia Young (born January 9, 1970), better known by her stage name Mia X, is an American rapper and songwriter from New Orleans. She enjoyed success in the local "bounce" scene of the early 1990s. She was the first female emcee to get a contract with rapper and entertainment magnate, Master P on his successful record label No Limit Records. She is known for collaborations with several No Limit Records artists, including Master P and Silkk the Shocker on the seminal albums, Ice Cream Man, Ghetto D and Charge It 2 Da Game.

== Early life, family and education ==
Young grew up in the Lafitte housing project in New Orleans' Fifth Ward. Her father was a trucker, and her mother was a counselor.

She graduated from Redeemer High School and briefly attended Delgado Community College before she decided to pursue a career in music.

== Music career ==
=== Music beginnings ===
Mia X's rap career began in the late 1980s and early '90s before she graduated from high school, when she performed in a "mobile entertainment service", New York Inc., with Mannie Fresh, who would later rise to stardom as the production genius behind Cash Money Records. She made her recorded debut in 1992 with the single "Ask them Suckas" (an answer song created in response to "Ask them Hoes" by 39 Posse), on Lamina Records. In 1993, she released "Da Payback," a maxi-single which appeared on both the Rap Dis! and Lamina Records labels. Despite its status as "the No. 1-selling local record of 1993 at Odyssey Records" did not generate any income for the artist.

In 1994, Mia X signed a contract for two albums with Roy Joseph, Jr.'s Emoja Records. The label (along with its successor, Slaughterhouse Records) released her full-length debut Mommie Dearest in 1995. Joseph later filed a $10 million lawsuit against Master P and No Limit Records, asserting that the label "persuaded Mia X to break her contract." No Limit Records subsequently filed a countersuit against Joseph asking for $20 million in damages.

=== 1995: TRU, No Limit Records and Good Girl Gone Bad ===
In 1995, Mia X was signed to Master P's label No Limit Records after he inquired at Peaches Records and Tapes (where she was working at the time) about promising local female rappers. She joined the roster as a solo artist and also became a member of Master P's group at the time, TRU, where she experienced national success. She was the first female rapper to be signed by No Limit Records. On November 21, 1995, Mia X released her first album, Good Girl Gone Bad, which failed to chart on any of the Billboard charts.

=== 1997–98: Unlady Like and Mama Drama ===
In 1997, she released her first single from her upcoming second album The Party Don't Stop featuring Master P and Foxy Brown. On June 24, 1997, Mia X released her second album, Unlady Like, which peaked at No. 21 on the Billboard 200 and No. 11 on the Top R&B/Hip-Hop Albums chart. The record was certified gold in October 1997.

On October 27, 1998, Mia X released her third album, Mama Drama, which peaked at No. 7 on the Billboard 200 and No. 3 on the Top R&B/Hip-Hop Albums charts.

=== 1999–present ===
Beginning in 1999, Mia X went on hiatus from recording following the deaths of 14 family members, including both her parents, in an 18-month span, in addition to the dissolution of the No Limit roster due to Master P pursuing non-musical interests. In the early 2000s, she worked in real estate and as a ghostwriter for other hip-hop artists.

In the aftermath of Hurricane Katrina in 2005, Mia X recorded "My FEMA People" in response to the ensuing disastrous conditions in New Orleans.

Mia X appeared on C-Murder's 2008 release Screamin' 4 Vengeance, on tracks "Mihita" and "Posted on tha Block". On June 13, 2014, she released a new single "Mr. Right", featuring artist Ms. Tasha via her label, Mama Mia Muzic. On September 1, 2015, Mia X released a new single "No More" featuring Caren Green. She released a mixtape in 2010 Unladylike Forever and claimed she was working on a new album Betty Rocka Locksmith, but it was never released.

== Personal life ==
In 2006 in a magazine article, her publicist released a statement of an upcoming cookbook. Before the cookbook was released, she did on online page on Instagram #teamwhipdempots. Her cookbook was finally released in 2018.

In the 2010s, Mia X was diagnosed with uterine cancer and recovered from it. In surgery for the cancer, the surgeons accidentally "tore her cornea off", leaving her with 73% vision in that eye.

=== Studio albums ===
- Good Girl Gone Bad (1995)
- Unlady Like (1997)
- Mama Drama (1998)

=== Extended plays ===
- Da Payback (1993)
- Mommie Dearest (1995)

== Filmography ==
Films

Year	Title	Role	Notes
1997	I'm Bout It	Kasey	Supporting role
1998	MP Da Last Don	Nicey	Supporting role
1998	I Got the Hook Up	Lola Mae	Supporting role
1999	Hot Boyz	Police Secretary	Uncredited role
1999	Foolish	Heckler #2	Cameo
2006	Dream Home	April	Supporting role

Television

Year	Title	Role	Notes
2013	Eastbound & Down	Security Guard	Episode: "Chapter 22"
