= Silkk the Shocker =

American rapper (born 1975)

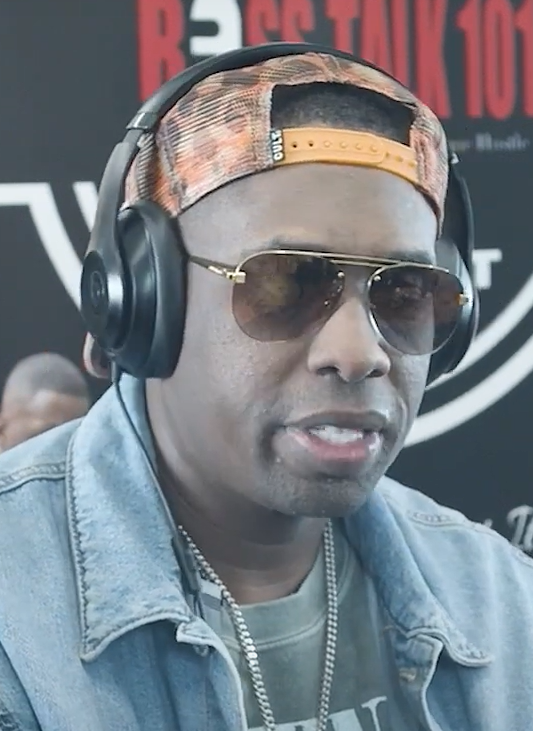
- Silkk in 2023

Background information
- Also known as: Vito; Silkk
- Born: Vyshonn King Miller; June 18, 1975 (age 51); New Orleans, Louisiana, U.S.
- Genre: Gangsta rap
- Occupations: Rapper; songwriter; actor
- Years active: 1989–present
- Labels: Priority; No Limit
- Member of: TRU
- Formerly of: 504 Boyz
- Children: 3

Vyshonn King Miller (born June 18, 1975), better known by his stage name Silkk the Shocker (formerly Silkk), is an American gangsta rapper. Raised in New Orleans, Louisiana, Miller signed with his brother Master P's record label No Limit Records to release his debut album, The Shocker (1996).

His second and third albums—Charge It 2 da Game (1998) and Made Man (1999)—received Platinum certifications by the Recording Industry Association of America (RIAA). Made Man debuted atop the Billboard 200.

== Music career ==
=== 1996–1998: The Shocker and Charge It 2 Da Game ===
After striking a deal with Priority, No Limit Records released Silkk's debut album The Shocker in August 1996, produced by Beats by the Pound, DJ Daryl, K-Lou and T-Bone. After changing his name to Silkk the Shocker, he went on to appear on numerous albums from TRU's Tru 2 da Game, Mia X's Unlady Like, and Mystikal's Unpredictable. He used the Shocker alias on a few No Limit albums in 1997.

Silkk appeared on Master P's 1997 hit "Make 'Em Say Uhh!" which was featured on Master P's 1997 album Ghetto D. Silkk released his next single with labelmate Mystikal, called "It Ain't My Fault". He released another single, "Just Be Straight with Me", featuring Destiny's Child.

The same year Silkk was featured on the hit single "Movin' On", a song from Mya's debut album Mýa. Charge It 2 Da Game became a big success over time, staying on the Billboard albums chart for over a year. It was certified Platinum after a few months.

=== 1999: Made Man ===
His third solo album, Made Man was released in January 1999. The singles "It Ain't My Fault 2" (feat. Mystikal) and "Somebody Like Me" (feat. Mya) were regularly played on MTV and BET. Stephen Thomas Erlewine of AllMusic panned the album for its formulaic, predictable style.

=== 2001–2004: My World, My Way and Based on a True Story ===
In 2001, Silkk released My World, My Way. He released the singles "That's Cool" featuring Trina and "He Did That" feat. Mac, which made it to No. 13 on the Hot R&B/Hip Hop Singles and Tracks. Based on a True Story, which was released in 2004 on New No Limit/Koch Records, did not garner much popularity.

=== 2010–present: Incredible ===
On June 3, 2010, a video of Silkk freestyling over DJ Khaled's "All I Do Is Win" was posted to YouTube. Silkk released his first mixtape called All I Do Is Win on August 21, 2010. It was confirmed that Silkk signed with his nephew Romeo's new record label, No Limit Forever Records, and is working on his sixth studio album called Incredible. Some of the producers on this album are Manny Streetz, Marvz, Mike Bangum of Da Beat Kadetz and JoJo Ryder. In 2010 Silkk the Shocker went on a tour with his brother Master P and nephew Romeo Miller. The tour was titled "No Limit Forever International".

On April 24, 2014, Silkk released the first single off his upcoming Incredible album titled "Don't Give Up". On May 15, 2014, Silkk released a music video on his Vevo channel for "Don't Give Up". On May 19, 2014, Miller released the second single off Incredible titled "We Ain't Even Trippin".

On March 2, 2015, Silkk announced via his official YouTube channel that his new single titled "Business" featuring No Limit Forever in-house producer BlaqNmilD would be released later in March and his album Incredible would be released later the same year along with a movie of the same name starring himself. On August 24, 2015, Miller released the music video for his second single titled "We Ain't Even Trippin"; it was directed by T. Church. On September 4, 2015, Miller released the third single off Incredible titled "Business" featuring No Limit Forever in-house producer BlaqNmilD.

== Other ventures ==
Silkk was featured on World Wrestling Entertainment's WWE Wreckless Intent album, which was released in May 2006. The song he performed on the album, "I'm Comin'", has since been used as the theme song for WWE Smackdown wrestler Montel Vontavious Porter until his release in late 2010. Silkk also performed former SmackDown! wrestler Orlando Jordan's theme song "Do It Big".

=== Acting career ===
In 1999, Silkk acted as the lead role in the major No Limit Records film Hot Boyz.

In 2007, Silkk, along with comedians Lil Duval and Michael Blackson, were cast as the lead actors in the Six Five film More Money, More Family. The film was produced by Silkk the Shocker and Tracy McGrady and shot on location in Orange, California, using film students from nearby Chapman University, originally intended for DVD release in Wal-Mart, but the film had yet to find a distributor. Grindstone Entertainment and Lionsgate Films distributed the movie, released in November 2015.

In 2011, Silkk co-starred in the horror film Reservation produced by Sedona Studios.

== Personal life ==
Silkk is the younger cousin of Mo B. Dick. His older brother, Kevin Miller, was killed during a robbery in 1990. Rappers C-Murder and Master P are his older brothers.

He is married to Junalyn "JuJu" Pattugalan, who is the sister of Cymphonique Miller's mother. He has three children, two sons and a daughter. His son Vyctorius Miller is a college basketball player.

== Discography ==
=== Studio albums ===
- The Shocker (1996)
- Charge It 2 da Game (1998)
- Made Man (1999)
- My World, My Way (2001)
- Based on a True Story (2004)
- It Will All Make Sense Later (2018)

== Filmography ==
Films

Year	Title	Role	Notes
1997	I'm Bout It	Vito "Silk" McKnight	Support role
1998	I Got the Hook-Up	T-Lay's Friend #4	Cameo role
1998	MP da Last Don	D.J.	Support role
1999	Corrupt	M.J.	Main role
1999	Hot Boyz	Kool	Main role
1999	No Tomorrow	Himself	Cameo role
2002	Undisputed	Gat Boyz Rapper 2	Cameo role
2003	Honey	Himself	Cameo role
2004	Still 'Bout It	Vito "Silk" McKnight	Support role
2006	God's Gift	Man	Support role
2006	Little Girl Blue: What's Become of You?	Ace Capone	Support role
2010	Reservation	Drez England	Support role
2015	Incredible	Himself	Biography
2015	More Money, More Family	Shawn	Main role
2019	I Got the Hook-Up 2	Shawn	Cameo role
2021	Kingz of the Castle	Montez	Support role
2022	My Perfect Wedding	Himself	Cameo role

Video games

Year	Title	Voice role	Notes
2002	Street Hoops	Himself	Vocals
