= Master P discography =

- Studio albums: 14
- Soundtrack albums: 3
- Compilation albums: 16
- Singles: 40
- Collaboration albums: 1
- Mixtapes: 11

The discography of Master P, an American rapper and record producer, also known as entrepreneur P. Miller, consists of fourteen studio albums, 40 singles, 16 compilation albums, one collaboration album, and 33 music videos.

Master P's music has been released on In-A-Minute, SOLAR Records, Priority Records, & Koch Records along with his former record label's No Limit Records, The New No Limit, Guttar Music & his current label No Limit Forever. He also the founder & former CEO of the major independent record label No Limit Records.

In 1991, Master P began his rap career with his first released his first album Get Away Clean on In-A-Minute. His next album Mama's Bad Boy was released in 1992. In 1994, after signing a deal with SOLAR Records he released his next album entitled The Ghettos Tryin to Kill Me!. In 1995, after signing an 85/15 distribution & publishing deal & ownership of all masters with Priority Records for his upcoming label No Limit Records. Master P released his next album 99 Ways to Die it was his first album to chart in Billboard magazine at number forty-one at the Top R&B/Hip-Hop Albums. Master P released his fifth album, Ice Cream Man, in 1996. It contained the lead single "Mr. Ice Cream Man", which had peaked at number ninety on the Billboard Hot 100, his first solo entry there. Ice Cream Man debuted at number twenty-six on the US Billboard 200 chart and was certified platinum by the Recording Industry Association of America (RIAA), making it more successful than his previous effort.

His next album Ghetto D charted the US Billboard 200 at number one, making it Master P's first number one album. The album contained Master P's most successful single to date "Make 'Em Say Uhh!" which went certified platinum. The album itself went certified Three Times platinum. In 1998, his next studio album MP Da Last Don also topped the US Billboard 200 at number one, making it Master P's second number one. It is also Master P's highest selling album to date selling over four-million plus copies making it certified Four Times Platinum in the US. His next studio album Only God Can Judge Me though not as successful as his previous album's it still charted on the Billboard 200 at number two & was certified Gold in the US.

In 2000, his next studio album Ghetto Postage charted on the Billboard 200 at number twenty-six it sold lower than his predecessor albums. After Master P's former label No Limit Records went bankrupt, he created a new label entitled The New No Limit & signed a distribution deal with Universal Records. He released his next studio album entitled Game Face it charted on the Billboard 200 at number fifty-three with substantially lower sales than his previous albums. After dropping himself from Universal Records he signed a new deal with Koch Records now known as E1 Music. He released his next album in 2004 it was entitled Good Side, Bad Side it was released with better overall success charting on the US Billboard 200 at number eleven. His next album Ghetto Bill charted on the US Billboard at number thirty-nine.

On December 6, 2013, Master P released his thirteenth album The Gift via his newly founded label No Limit Forever Records & XLP Distribution. On November 27, 2015, Master P would release his fourteenth album entitled Empire, from the Hood to Hollywood via his label No Limit Forever Records & Globy House Records.

== Albums ==
=== Studio albums ===
List of studio albums, with selected chart positions and certifications
Title	Album details	Peak chart positions			Certifications
Title	Album details	US	US R&B	US Rap	Certifications
Get Away Clean	Released: September 13, 1991; Label: No Limit, In-A-Minute; Formats: CD, cassette, digital download	—	—	—	
Mama's Bad Boy	Released: April 20, 1992; Label: No Limit, In-A-Minute; Formats: CD, cassette, digital download	—	—	—	
The Ghettos Tryin to Kill Me!	Released: March 18, 1994; Label: No Limit, Priority; Formats: CD, LP, cassette, digital download	—	—	—	
99 Ways to Die	Released: February 7, 1995; Label: No Limit, Priority; Formats: CD, LP, cassette, digital download	—	41	—	
Ice Cream Man	Released: April 16, 1996; Label: No Limit, Priority; Formats: CD, LP, cassette, digital download	26	3	—	RIAA: Platinum
Ghetto D	Released: September 2, 1997; Label: No Limit, Priority; Formats: CD, LP, cassette, digital download	1	1	22	RIAA: 3× Platinum
MP da Last Don	Released: June 2, 1998; Label: No Limit, Priority; Formats: CD, LP, cassette, digital download	1	1	—	RIAA: 4× Platinum; MC: Gold
Only God Can Judge Me	Released: October 26, 1999; Label: No Limit, Priority; Formats: CD, LP, cassette, digital download	2	1	—	RIAA: Gold
Ghetto Postage	Released: November 28, 2000; Label: No Limit, Priority; Formats: CD, LP, cassette, digital download	26	2	—	RIAA: Gold
Game Face	Released: December 18, 2001; Label: The New No Limit, Universal; Formats: CD, LP, cassette, digital download	53	12	—	
Good Side, Bad Side	Released: March 23, 2004; Label: The New No Limit, Koch; Formats: CD, LP, cassette, digital download	11	3	—	
Ghetto Bill	Released: June 21, 2005; Label: The New No Limit, Koch; Formats: CD, cassette, digital download	39	12	7	
Living Legend: Certified D-Boy	Released: November 25, 2005; Label: Guttar Music; Formats: CD, digital download	—	98	—	
The Gift	Released: December 6, 2013; Label: No Limit Forever, XLP; Formats: CD, digital download	—	—	—	
Empire, from the Hood to Hollywood	Released: November 27, 2015; Label: No Limit Forever, Globy House; Formats: CD, digital download	—	—	—	
"—" denotes a recording that did not chart.

=== Collaborative albums ===
Title	Album details
Hip Hop History (with Romeo as Miller Boyz)	Released: September 4, 2007; Label: Take A Stand, UrbanDigital, GoDigital; Formats: CD, LP, digital download

=== Compilation albums ===
List of compilation albums, with selected chart positions and certifications
Title	Album details	Peak chart positions		Certifications
Title	Album details	US	US R&B	Certifications
West Coast Bad Boyz, Vol. 1: Anotha Level of the Game (with various artists)	Released: August 9, 1994; Re-Released: July 27, 1997; Label: No Limit, Priority; Formats: CD, LP	—	—	
West Coast Bad Boyz: High fo Xmas (with various artists)	Released: November 8, 1994; Label: No Limit, Priority; Formats: CD, LP	—	—	
Down South Hustlers: Bouncin' and Swingin' (with various artists)	Released: October 31, 1995; Label: No Limit, Priority; Formats: CD, LP	139	13	
West Coast Bad Boyz II (with various artists)	Released: January 10, 1997; Label: No Limit, Priority; Formats: CD, LP	17	6	
In tha Beginning...There Was Rap (with various artists)	Released: November 25, 1997; Label: Priority; Formats: CD, LP	15	4	RIAA: Gold
Mean Green (with various artists)	Released: September 28, 1998; Label: No Limit, Priority; Formats: CD, LP	9	6	RIAA: Gold
We Can't Be Stopped (with No Limit)	Released: September 28, 1998; Label: No Limit, Priority; Formats: CD, LP	19	2	
Who U Wit? (with various artists)	Released: May 25, 1999; Label: No Limit, Priority; Formats: CD, LP	62	22	
West Coast Bad Boyz, Vol. 3: Poppin' Collars (with various artists)	Released: March 19, 2002; Label: No Limit, Priority; Formats: CD, LP	108	28	
Remix Classics	Released: September 20, 2005; Label: Koch; Formats: CD, LP	—	81	
The Best of Master P	Released: October 4, 2005; Label: Priority; Formats: CD, LP	—	61	
America's Most Luved Bad Guy	Released: March 21, 2006; Label: GoDigital; Formats: CD, LP	—	—	
The Ultimate Master P	Released: September 5, 2006; Label: Koch; Formats: CD, LP	—	91	
Gutta Music All-Stars (with various artists)	Released: May 15, 2007; Label: Guttar Music, UrbanDigital, GoDigital; Formats: CD, LP	—	—	
Featuring...Master P	Released: August 14, 2007; Label: PCT; Formats: CD, LP	—	—	
Starring Master P	Released: January 22, 2010; Label: Priority; Formats: CD, LP	—	—	
"—" denotes a recording that did not chart.

=== Soundtrack albums ===
List of soundtrack albums, with selected chart positions and certifications
Title	Album details	Peak chart positions		Certifications
Title	Album details	US	US R&B	Certifications
I'm Bout It (with various artists)	Released: May 13, 1997; Label: No Limit, Priority; Formats: CD, LP, digital download	4	1	RIAA: Platinum
I Got the Hook-Up (with various artists)	Released: April 7, 1998; Label: No Limit, Priority; Formats: CD, LP, digital download	3	1	RIAA: Platinum
Foolish (with various artists)	Released: March 23, 1999; Label: No Limit, Priority; Formats: CD, LP, digital download	32	10	RIAA: Gold

== Extended plays ==
Title	EP details
Intelligent Hoodlum - EP	Release date: May 27, 2017; Label: No Limit Forever; Formats: Digital download

== Mixtapes ==
Title	Mixtape details
TMZ (Too Many Zeroes)	Released: November 16, 2011; Label: No Limit Forever; Hosted by DJ Greg Street & No Limit Forever
Al Capone	Released: January 16, 2013; Label: No Limit Forever; Hosted by No Limit Forever; Retail Mixtape
New World Order (with Louie V. Mob)	Released: February 12, 2013; Label: No Limit Forever; Hosted by No Limit Forever; Retail Mixtape
Famous Again	Released: August 6, 2013; Label: No Limit Forever; Hosted by No Limit Forever
The Gift Vol. 1: Return of The Ice Cream Man	Released: February 28, 2014; Label: No Limit Forever; Hosted by DJ Swamp Izzo & No Limit Forever
We All We Got (with Money Mafia)	Released: January 5, 2015; Label: No Limit Forever; Retail Mixtape
#CP3 (with Ace B)	Released: February 9, 2015; Label: No Limit Forever
Hustlin (with Money Mafia)	Released: April 20, 2015; Label: No Limit Forever
The Luciano Family (with Money Mafia)	Released: July 16, 2015; Label: No Limit Forever; Retail Mixtape
Middle Finga	Released: March 16, 2016; Label: No Limit Forever; Hosted by DJ Esco
The G Mixtape	Released: August 30, 2016; Label: No Limit Forever; Featuring: No Limit Boys; Retail Mixtape
Louisiana Hot Sauce	Released: October 28, 2016; Label: No Limit Forever; Retail Mixtape
We All We Got (with No Limit Boys)	Released: January 6, 2017; Label: No Limit Forever; Retail Mixtape
Intelligent Hoodlum	Released: May 27, 2017; Label: No Limit Forever
Tony Mantana	Released: February 9, 2018; Label: No Limit Forever

== Singles ==
=== As lead artist ===
List of singles as lead artist, with selected chart positions and certifications, showing year released and album name
Title	Year	Peak chart positions			Certifications	Album
Title	Year	US	US R&B	US Rap	Certifications	Album
"Jack of the Jackers"	1991	—	—	—		Get Away Clean
"I'm Going Big Time"	1992	—	—	—		Mama's Bad Boy
"Trust Nobody" (featuring E-A-Ski)	1992	—	—	—		Mama's Bad Boy
"Bastard Child"	1994	—	—	—		The Ghettos Tryin to Kill Me!
"The Ghetto's Tryin' to Kill Me!" (featuring Silkk the Shocker)	1994	—	—	—		The Ghettos Tryin to Kill Me!
"When They Gone"	1995	—	—	—		99 Ways to Die
"Mr. Ice Cream Man" (featuring Silkk the Shocker)	1996	90	55	12		Ice Cream Man
"No More Tears" (featuring Silkk the Shocker and Mo B. Dick)	1996	—	78	15		Ice Cream Man
"R.I.P. Tupac"	1997	—	—	—		West Coast Bad Boyz II
"Is There a Heaven 4 a Gangsta?"	1997	—	—	—		Rhyme & Reason: Music from the Motion Picture
"I Miss My Homies" (featuring Pimp C and Silkk the Shocker)	1997	25	16	1	RIAA: Gold	Ghetto D
"6 in the Mornin'"	1997	—	—	—		In tha Beginning...There Was Rap
"Make 'Em Say Uhh!" (featuring Silkk the Shocker, Mia X, Fiend and Mystikal)	1998	16	18	6	RIAA: Platinum	Ghetto D
"I Got the Hook Up!" (featuring Sons of Funk)	1998	16	11	1	RIAA: Gold	I Got the Hook Up: Music from the Motion Picture/ The Game of Funk
"Thinkin' Bout U" (featuring Mia X and Mo B. Dick)	1998	—	—	—		MP da Last Don
"Hot Boys and Girls" (featuring Mystikal, Mia X, Silkk the Shocker and Kane & Abel)	1998	—	87	—		MP da Last Don
"Make 'Em Say Uhh! #2" (featuring Fiend, Snoop Dogg, Mia X and Silkk The Shocker)	1998	—	—	—		MP da Last Don
"Goodbye to My Homies" (featuring Mo B. Dick, Sons of Funk and Silkk the Shocker)	1998	27	38	5		MP da Last Don
"Thug Girl" (featuring Snoop Dogg and Silkk the Shocker)	1999	—	—	—		MP da Last Don
"B-Ball"	1999	—	—	—		Who U Wit?
"Step to This" (featuring DIG)	1999	88	40	3		Only God Can Judge Me
"Y'all Don't Want None" (featuring Mystikal)	1999	—	—	—		Only God Can Judge Me
"Light It Up" (featuring The No Limit All Stars)	1999	—	—	—		Light It Up: Music from the Motion Picture
"Stop Playing With Me"	2000	—	—	—		Only God Can Judge Me
"Where Do We Go From Here" (featuring Sons of Funk, Nas & Mac)	2000	—	—	—		Only God Can Judge Me
"Da Ballers" (featuring Jermaine Dupri)	2000	—	—	—		Only God Can Judge Me
"Souljas"	2000	98	35	1		Ghetto Postage
"Bout Dat" (featuring Silkk the Shocker)	2000	—	46	—		Ghetto Postage
"Pockets Gone' Stay Fat" (featuring Magic)	2001	—	—	—		Ghetto Postage
"Ooohhhwee" (featuring Weebie)	2002	63	19	—		Game Face
"Rock It" (featuring Weebie & Krazy)	2002	—	72	—		Game Face
"Real Love" (featuring Sera-Lynn)	2002	—	—	—		Game Face
"Them Jeans"	2004	—	40	—		Good Side, Bad Side
"Act a Fool" (featuring Lil Jon)	2004	—	72	—		Good Side, Bad Side
"I Need Dubs" (featuring Romeo)	2005	—	75	—		Ghetto Bill
"Get the Party Crackin" (featuring Halleluyah, Silkk the Shocker & Ruga)	2005	—	—	—		Ghetto Bill
"Friends with Benefits" (featuring Kirko Bangz)	2012	—	—	—		Al Capone (Mixtape)
"Woke Up a Millionaire" (featuring Deezle)	2013	—	—	—		The Gift
"I Need an Armored Truck" (featuring Romeo)	2013	—	—	—		The Gift
"I Ain't Gonna Let It Happen Twice" (featuring Gangsta & Play Beezy)	2013	—	—	—		The Gift
"You Need to Know"	2013	—	—	—		The Gift
"Lonely Road" (featuring Howie T & A.D.)	2013	—	—	—		The Gift
"23" (featuring Rick Ross)	2013	—	—	—		The Gift
"Home Boys" (featuring Maine Musik, T.E.C., Krazy & Ace B)	2015	—	—	—		—N/a
"Funeral" (featuring No Limit Boys, Ace B & Angelo Nano)	2016	—	—	—		Middle Finga (Mixtape)
"Middle Finga" (featuring No Limit Boys)	2016	—	—	—		Middle Finga (Mixtape)
"My Business"	2016	—	—	—		Middle Finga (Mixtape) & The G Mixtape (Mixtape)
"You Need Me and I Need You" (featuring Cymphonique)	2016	—	—	—		The G Mixtape (Mixtape)
"Too Legit"	2016	—	—	—		The G Mixtape (Mixtape)
"Believe" (featuring Moe Roy & Snootie Wild)	2016	—	—	—		The G Mixtape (Mixtape)
"Dirty Game" (featuring Moe Roy & Ace B)	2016	—	—	—		The G Mixtape (Mixtape)
"I'm Just Trying" (featuring Moe Roy & Lambo)	2016	—	—	—		The G Mixtape (Mixtape)
"Made It Out" (featuring Moe Roy, Ace B & Maserati Rome)	2016	—	—	—		The G Mixtape (Mixtape)
"Watch 'Em" (featuring No Limit Boys)	2016	—	—	—		The G Mixtape (Mixtape)
"Broken" (featuring Moe Roy & Ace B)	2016	—	—	—		Louisiana Hot Sauce (Mixtape)
"Flex'n on 'Em"	2016	—	—	—		Louisiana Hot Sauce (Mixtape)
"Too Much" (featuring Young Vee)	2016	—	—	—		Louisiana Hot Sauce (Mixtape)
"—" denotes a title that did not chart, or was not released in that territory.						Louisiana Hot Sauce (Mixtape)

=== Promotional singles ===
Year	Title	Album
1996	"Bout It Bout It Pt. 2" (featuring Mia X)	Ice Cream Man
1998	"Kenny's Dead"	Chef Aid: The South Park Album
2011	"Meagon Good" (as Monstahh featuring Bengie B, Valentino & Romeo)	The Gift
2011	"Reloaded"(as Monstahh featuring Bengie B, T-Bo & Miss Chee)	The Gift
2011	"Trending" (as Monstahh featuring Gucci Mane & Romeo)	The Gift
2011	"Boyfriend & Girlfriend" (as Monstahh featuring Miss Chee)	The Gift

=== As featured artist ===
List of singles as featured artist, with selected chart positions and certifications, showing year released and album name
Title	Year	Peak chart positions			Certifications	Album
Title	Year	US	US R&B	US Rap	Certifications	Album
"The Shocker" (Silkk the Shocker featuring Master P)	1996	—	—	—		The Shocker
"Gangstafied" (Kane & Able featuring Master P & Mo B. Dick)	1996	—	—	—		7 Sins
"My Best Friend" (Mr. Serv-On featuring Master P)	1996	—	—	—		Life Insurance
"The Party Don't Stop" (Mia X featuring Master P and Foxy Brown)	1997	—	—	—		Unlady Like
"4, 3, 2, 1" (LL Cool J featuring Master P, Canibus, DMX, Method Man and Redman)	1997	75	24	10		Phenomenon
"With Me Part II" (Destiny's Child featuring Master P)	1998	—	—	—		—N/a
"Just Be Straight with Me" (Silkk the Shocker featuring Master P and Destiny's Child)	1998	57	36	12		Charge It 2 da Game
"Let's Ride" (Montell Jordan featuring Master P and Silkk the Shocker)	1998	2	1	—	RIAA: Platinum	Let's Ride
"I'm a Soulja" (Ghetto Commission featuring Master P and Mystikal)	1998	—	—	—		Wise Guys
"A 2nd Chance" (C-Murder featuring Mo B. Dick, Master P and Silkk the Shocker)	1998	—	—	—		Life or Death
"Homies & Thuggs" (Scarface featuring Master P and 2Pac)	1998	—	—	—		My Homies
"Times So Hard" (Young Bleed featuring Master P, Fiend, Mo B. Dick and O'Dell)	1998	—	—	—		My Balls and My Word
"Time After Time" (Kane & Able featuring Master P)	1998	—	—	18		Am I My Brother's Keeper
"Take My Pain" (Fiend featuring Master P, Silkk The Shocker and Sons of Funk)	1998	—	11	—		There's One in Every Family
"Street Life" (Soulja Slim featuring Master P, Silkk The Shocker and O'Dell)	1998	—	17	—		Give It 2 'Em Raw
"All 4 One" (Prime Suspects Featuring Master P)	1998	—	—	—		Guilty Till Proven Innocent
"If It Don't Make $$$..." (Skull Duggery featuring Mo B. Dick, Fiend and Master P)	1998	—	—	—		These Wicked Streets
"Live or Die" (Naughty by Nature featuring Master P, Mystikal, Silkk the Shocker and Phiness)	1999	—	86	—		Nineteen Naughty Nine: Nature's Fury
"It's Your Thing" (Mercedes featuring Master P)	1999	71	12	4		Rear End
"Is It You? (Déjà Vu)" (Made Men featuring Master P)	1999	—	—	—		Classic Limited Edition
"How U Like It" (Mr. Marcelo featuring Master P)	1999	—	—	—		Brick Livin'
"Ghetto Rain" (Silkk the Shocker featuring Master Pand O'Dell)	1999	—	—	—		Made Man
"He Did That" (Silkk the Shocker featuring Mac and Master P)	2000	98	15	3		My World, My Way
"They Don't Really Know You" (C-Murder featuring Erica Fox and Master P)	2000	—	—	—		Trapped in Crime
"Lay Low" (Snoop Dogg featuring Master P, Nate Dogg, Butch Cassidy, Goldie Loc and Tray Deee)	2001	50	20	8		Tha Last Meal
"2-Way" (Lil' Romeo featuring Master P and Silkk the Shocker)	2002	—	65	—		Game Time/Kangaroo Jack (soundtrack)
"Bout It Bout It Part III" (The Diplomats featuring Master P)	2002	—	—	—		Diplomatic Immunity & Paid In Full/Dream Team
"Choppa Style" (Choppa featuring Master P)	2003	94	49	—		Straight from the N.O.
"We Like Them Girls" (Silkk the Shocker featuring Master P and Petey Pablo)	2004	—	69	—		Based on a True Story
"H.N.I.C." (AY Bay Bay featuring Rick Ross, Master P and T-Pain)	2013	—	—	—		Non-album singles
"Like Whaaat" (Remix) (Problem featuring Wiz Khalifa, Tyga, Chris Brown and Master P)	2013	—	—	—		
"Bout It Bout It" (XAV featuring Master P)	2014	—	—	—		Zeeky
"Feel Special" (BlaqNmilD featuring Master P)	2015	—	—	—		The Becoming
"Bout It" (Remix) (Rayface featuring Master P)	2016	—	—	—		Non-album singles
"Whole Notha" (That Nation featuring Master P)	2016	—	—	—		
"Same Day" (Ace B featuring Moe Roy & Master P)	2016	—	—	—		Ace Of Spades
"Girls" (Moe Roy featuring Master P, Ace B & Lambo)	2016	—	—	—		Trap Michael Jackson
"Master PeeWee" (PeeWee Longway featuring Master P & Gucci Mane)	2017	—	—	—		Non-album single
"—" denotes a title that did not chart, or was not released in that territory.

=== Collaboration singles ===
List of collaboration singles, with selected chart positions, showing year released and album name
Title	Year	Peak chart positions			Album
Title	Year	US	US R&B	US Rap	Album
"Peace 2 Da Streets" (with King George, Ray Luv, Dangerous Dame, Lil' Ric, JT, Mac Spoon, 4-Tay, The Delinquents, Toby T, The Perk, Erase E & Keylo)	1994	—	—	—	West Coast Bad Boyz, Vol. 1: Anotha Level of the Game
"Playaz from the South" (with Silkk The Shocker & UGK)	1995	—	—	—	Down South Hustlers: Bouncin' and Swingin'
"Bounce That Azz" (with Gangsta T, King George & Silkk the Shocker)	1995	—	—	—	Down South Hustlers: Bouncin' and Swingin'
"If I Could Change" (with Steady Mobb'n, Mia X, Mo B. Dick & O'Dell)	1997	48	23	7	I'm Bout It: Music from the Motion Picture
"How Ya Do Dat" (with Young Bleed featuring C-Loc)	1997	—	29	—	I'm Bout It: Music from the Motion Picture & My Balls and My Word
"Scream" (with Slikk The Shocker)	1997	—	—	—	Scream 2 (soundtrack)
"Major Players" (with Mia X, Silkk the Shocker, Porsha & Mean Green)	1998	—	—	—	Mean Green
"Foolish" (with Magic & Mo B. Dick)	1999	—	—	—	Foolish: Music from the Motion Picture
"Pop Lockin II" (with Daz Dillinger, E-40, Goldie Loc, Silkk the Shocker, Snoop Dogg & WC)	2002	—	—	—	West Coast Bad Boyz, Vol. 3: Poppin' Collars
"My Life" (with Romeo as Miller Boyz featuring Miss Kitty & Playa)	2006	—	—	—	Hip Hop History
"Let The Kids Grow" (with Romeo as Miller Boyz)	2007	—	—	—	Hip Hop History
"Side Kick" (with Romeo as Miller Boyz featuring Playa)	2007	—	—	—	Hip Hop History
"I'm So Fly" (with Romeo as Miller Boyz featuring Young-V)	2008	—	—	—	Hip Hop History
"Black History" (with Romeo as Miller Boyz)	2008	—	—	—	Hip Hop History
"Power" (with Money Mafia featuring Lil Wayne)	2015	—	—	—	We All We Got
"We Bout It" (with Money Mafia featuring Calliope Var)	2015	—	—	—	We All We Got
"Bonita" (with Money Mafia)	2015	—	—	—	The Luciano Family
"—" denotes a title that did not chart, or was not released in that territory.

== Guest appearances ==
Title	Year	Other artist(s)	Project
"I Got the Cream"	1996	—N/a	The Substitute (soundtrack)
Bang on Em	1996	TRU, Mr. Serv On	The Substitute (soundtrack)
"Meal Ticket"	1997	UGK, 8Ball & MGK	I'm Bout It (soundtrack)
"Pimp A Hustle"	1997	20-2 Life, Mia X	Twenty 2 Life
"Whatever It Takes"	1997	20-2 Life	Twenty 2 Life
"4Ever Tru"	1997	Mia X, C-Murder, Silkk The Shocker	Unlady Like
"You Don't Wanna Go 2 War"	1997	Mia X, C-Murder, Mystikal, Silkk The Shocker	Unlady Like
"My Best Friend"	1997	Mr. Serv-On	Life Insurance
"Time to Check My Fetty"	1997	Mr. Serv-On	Life Insurance
"Heaven Is So Close"	1997	Kenya Miller, Mo B. Dick, Silkk The Shocker	Life Insurance
"Hustlin'"	1997	Mystikal	Life Insurance
"It's Real"	1997	Brotha Lynch Hung	Life Insurance
"Let's Get It Started"	1997	Mia X, Silkk The Shocker	Life Insurance
"Tryin' to Make It Out da Ghetto"	1997	Mac	Life Insurance
"Ain't No Limit"	1997	Mystikal, Silkk The Shocker	Unpredictable
"Born 2 Be A Soldier"	1997	Mystikal, Fiend, Mac, Silkk The Shocker	Unpredictable
"Gangstas"	1997	Mystikal, Snoop Dogg	Unpredictable
"Ghetto Child"	1997	Mystikal, Silkk The Shocker	Unpredictable
"Here We Go"	1997	Mystikal, B-Legit, E-40	Unpredictable
"Playa 4 Life"	1997	Rappin' 4-Tay	4 tha Hard Way
"How to Be a Playa"	1997	Silkk the Shocker, Fiend	How to Be a Player (soundtrack)
"after dollars, no cents"	1997	Silkk the Shocker	Southwest Riders/Ghetto D
"It's On"	1997	Steady Mobb'n, Fiend, Mystikal	Pre-Meditated Drama
"Trying to Get Mine"	1997	Steady Mobb'n, JT the Bigga Figga	Pre-Meditated Drama
"Up To No Good"	1997	Steady Mobb'n, Big Ed, Mia X	Pre-Meditated Drama
"West To South"	1997	Steady Mobb'n, C-Loc, C-Murder, Fiend, Kane & Abel, Mac, Silkk the Shocker	Pre-Meditated Drama
"Hit em Up"	1997	TRU, Mercedes	Nothing to Lose (soundtrack)
"Bangin'"	1997	Westside Connection	West Coast Bad Boyz II
"Whatever It Takes"	1998	8Ball, Psycho Drama, Mystikal, Silkk The Shocker	Lost
"Assassin"	1998	Big Ed	The Assassin
"Life"	1998	Big Ed	The Assassin
"I'm Yo Soldier"	1998	Big Ed, Silkk The Shocker, Sons of Funk	The Assassin
"Shake'm Up"	1998	Big Ed, C-Murder, Gambino Family, Mac	The Assassin
"Uh Oh"	1998	Big Ed, Fiend, Mystikal	The Assassin
"Where The Playas At?"	1998	C- Loc, Silkk The Shocker	Concentration Camp II: Da Halocaust
"Only The Strong Survive"	1998	C-Murder	Life Or Death
"Akickdoe"	1998	C-Murder, UGK	Life Or Death
"Making Moves"	1998	C-Murder, Mo B. Dick	Life Or Death
"Soldiers"	1998	C-Murder, Big Ed, Fiend, Kane & Abel, Mac, Mia X, Mystikal, Silkk the Shocker	Life Or Death
"Back Against The Wall"	1998	E-40, Fiend	The Element of Surprise
"Do You Know"	1998	Fiend, Mystikal	There's One in Every Family
"Only A Few"	1998	Fiend, Big Ed, Silkk The Shocker	There's One in Every Family
"Slangin"	1998	Fiend, UGK	There's One in Every Family
"Who Got The Fire?"	1998	Fiend, Snoop Dogg	There's One in Every Family
"I'm A Baller"	1998	Gambino Family, C-Murder, Fiend, Mia X	Ghetto Organized
"Ashes and Dust"	1998	Gambino Family	Mean Green
"Hustla Baller"	1998	Ghetto Commission	Wise Guys
"Thug 'Til I Die"	1998	Ghetto Commission	Wise Guys
"I'm a Soulja"	1998	Ghetto Commission, Mystikal	Wise Guys
"You Know I'm A Ho"	1998	Ice Cube	The Players Club
"Call Me When You Need Some"	1998	Kane & Abel, Silkk The Shocker, Sons of Funk	Am I My Brother's Keeper
"Greens, Cornbread & Cabbage"	1998	Kane & Abel, Mo B. Dick, Prime Suspects	Am I My Brother's Keeper
"Tryin 2 Have Sumthin'"	1998	Kane & Abel, Fiend, Mo B. Dick	Am I My Brother's Keeper
"Beef"	1998	Mac	Shell Shocked
"Money Gets It"	1998	Mac	Shell Shocked
"Soldier Party"	1998	Mac	Shell Shocked
"Made Niggaz"	1998	Mack 10, Mystikal	The Recipe
"Ghetto Godzilla"	1998	Magic	Sky's The Limit
"Don't Start No Shit"	1998	Mia X, C-Murder	Mama Drama
"Life Ain't Cool"	1998	Mystikal, Anita Thomas, Silkk The Shocker	Ghetto Fabulous
"Stack Yo Chips"	1998	Mystikal, C-Murder	Ghetto Fabulous
"Me And You"	1998	Silkk The Shocker	Charge It 2 da Game
"Who I Be?"	1998	Silkk The Shocker	Charge It 2 da Game
"How Many Niggas?"	1998	Silkk The Shocker, Big Ed, C-Murder, Fiend, Lil' Gotti, Mia X, Mac, Mystikal, Skull Duggery	Charge It 2 da Game
"I'm A Soldier"	1998	Silkk The Shocker, C-Murder, Mia X, Mystikal	Charge It 2 da Game
"If I Don't Gotta"	1998	Silkk The Shocker, Fiend	Charge It 2 da Game
"Mama Always Told Me"	1998	Silkk The Shocker, 8Ball, C-Murder	Charge It 2 da Game
"Tell Me"	1998	Silkk The Shocker, C-Murder	Charge It 2 da Game
"Thug N' Me"	1998	Silkk The Shocker, O'Dell, Mo B. Dick, Ms. Peaches	Charge It 2 da Game
"Throw Yo Hood Up"	1998	Silkk The Shocker, Snoop Dogg	Charge It 2 da Game
"Where You From"	1998	Skull Duggery, Silkk The Shocker	These Wicked Streets
"Get Bout It & Rowdy"	1998	Snoop Dogg	Da Game Is to Be Sold, Not to Be Told
"Whatcha Gon Do?"	1998	Snoop Dogg	Da Game Is to Be Sold, Not to Be Told
"Snoop World"	1998	Snoop Dogg	Da Game Is to Be Sold, Not to Be Told
"20 Dollars to My Name"	1998	Snoop Dogg, Fiend, Silkk The Shocker, Soulja Slim	Da Game Is to Be Sold, Not to Be Told
"Make Love to a Thug"	1998	Sons of Funk	The Game of Funk
"Time Will Tell"	1998	Sons of Funk	The Game of Funk
"Side to Side"	1998	Sons of Funk, Mo B. Dick, Silkk The Shocker	The Game of Funk
"You Ain't Never Seen"	1998	Soulja Slim	Give It 2 'Em Raw
"N.L. Party"	1998	Soulja Slim, Big Ed, Full Blooded, Gambino Family, Kane & Abel, Mac, Magic, Mystikal, Prime Suspects, Silkk, Snoop Dogg, Tre-Nitty	Give It 2 'Em Raw
"Pray For Your Baby"	1998	Soulja Slim, Tre-Nitty	Give It 2 'Em Raw
"Ghetto Life"	1998	Steady Mobb'n, O'Dell, Snoop Dogg	Black Mafia
"Lil' Nigga"	1998	Steady Mobb'n, Lil Soldiers	Black Mafia
"Bring The Noise"	1998	Young Bleed, Mystikal	My Balls and My Word
"Keep It Real"	1998	Young Bleed, C-Loc	My Balls and My Word
"Lil Nigga"	1999	C-Murder	Bossalinie
"Livin' Legend"	1999	C-Murder	Bossalinie
"Still Makin' Moves"	1999	C-Murder, Lil' Kevin, Mo B. Dick	Bossalinie
"Dead & Gone"	1999	CCG, Silkk The Shocker	Only Game In Town
"This Is For The Riders"	1999	Eddie Griffin, Fiend, Silkk The Shocker	The Message
"Come and Get It"	1999	Lil Italy	On Top of da World
"Genocide"	1999	Mac, Ms. Peaches	World War III
"We Deadly"	1999	Mac, Skull Duggery, Silkk The Shocker	World War III
"Ice On My Wrist"	1999	Magic	Thuggin'
"Did I Do That?"	1999	Mariah Carey, Mystikal	Rainbow
"Crazy Bout Ya"	1999	Mercedes, Ms. Peaches	Rear End
"I Need A Thug"	1999	Mercedes, O'Dell, Popeye	Rear End
"We Won't Stop"	1999	Silkk The Shocker, C-Murder	Made Man
"You Know What We Bout"	1999	Silkk The Shocker, Jay-Z	Made Man
"Doing It Live"	1999	The Delinquents	Bosses Will Be Bosses
"Hustlin"	2000	C-Murder, Krazy	Trapped in Crime
"Too Much Noise"	2000	C-Murder, D.I.G.	Trapped in Crime
"How U Like It"	2000	Mr. Marcelo	Brick Livin'
"Wildin"	2000	Mr. Marcelo	Brick Livin'
"Back Up Off Me"	2000	Snoop Dogg, Magic	Tha Last Meal
"Get Bucked"	2001	C-Murder, Silkk the Shocker, T-Bo	C-P-3.com
"What U Gonna Do"	2001	C-Murder, Ms. Peaches, Silkk the Shocker	C-P-3.com
"I Luv My Project"	2001	Krazy, Ezel Swang	Breather Life
"Where They At"	2001	Lil' Romeo	Lil' Romeo
"Na Na Na"	2001	Silkk the Shocker	My World, My Way
"D-Game Remix"	2001	Silkk the Shocker, Terror, Krazy	My World, My Way
"Go Down"	2001	Silkk the Shocker, Erica Fox	My World, My Way
"He Did That"	2001	Silkk the Shocker, Mac	My World, My Way
"I Wish"	2001	Silkk the Shocker, Snoop Dogg	My World, My Way
"Can't Touch Us"	2001	Soulja Slim, Afficial, Krazy, Silkk the Shocker, Slay Sean	The Streets Made Me
"Lil' Romeo's B House"	2002	Lil' Romeo	Scooby-Doo Soundtrack
"My Biz"	2002	Lil' Romeo	Game Time
"Where They At II"	2002	Lil' Romeo	Game Time
"Commercial"	2002	Lil' Romeo, Lil' D	Game Time
"It's Real"	2002	Brotha Lynch Hung, Silkk the Shocker	Appearances: Book 1
"No Limit Soldier Pt.3"	2003	Choppa, Curren$y	Straight from the N.O.
"Represent Yo Block"	2003	Choppa, B.G.	Straight from the N.O.
"20s on Cars 26s on Trucks"	2004	Curren$y, Liberty, Lil' Romeo	SportsCenter
"Let Me Shine"	2004	Lil' Romeo	Romeoland
"Clap"	2004	Silkk The Shocker	Based On A True Story
"We Don't Dance We Bounce"	2004	Silkk The Shocker	Based On A True Story
"Got It On Lock"	2004	Silkk The Shocker, Pop	Based On A True Story
"We Like Them Girls"	2004	Silkk The Shocker, Petey Pablo	Based On A True Story
"Ain't That Different"	2006	Cognito, Black Don, D-Buck, Hallellujah	Recognition
"Rock With It"	2006	Romeo, C-Los, Play Beezy	God's Gift
"Say It To My Face"	2006	Romeo	God's Gift
"Brinks"	2011	Gucci Mane	The Return of Mr. Zone 6
"Bury Me"	2011	Play Beezy, Black Don, T.E.C.	—N/a
"Bad Girls"	2011	Romeo, Eastwood, Sean Kingston	I Am No Limit
"Money Flow"	2011	Romeo, Black Don, D	I Am No Limit
"Trending"	2011	Romeo, Gucci Mane	I Am No Limit
"My Potnas"	2011	T.E.C.	—N/a
"Play It Raw"	2012	Bengie B, Louie V Mob	Ben Raw, Ben Real
"Don't Make No Sense"	2012	Chief Keef, Fat Trel	Finally Rich
"Scale"	2012	Krazy, T.E.C.	—N/a
"Flatline"	2012	Miss Chee	Flatline
"For The City"	2012	Miss Chee	Flatline
"I Got"	2012	Miss Chee, Ace High, Oak Tree, T.E.C.	—N/a
"Dumb Shit"	2012	Pallo Da Jiint, Bengie B, T.E.C.	Dat Heat Rock
"Keep It Real"	2012	Romeo	Inception
"On A Bubble"	2012	Romeo	Inception
"I Came From Nothing"	2012	T.E.C., Eastwood	The Take Off
"HVN4AGNGSTA"	2012	The Game	—N/a
"Bad"	2013	Alley Boy, Fat Trel	War Cry
"So Kool"	2013	Co-Ruff, Miss Chee, T-Bo	Bi Polar
"HNIC"	2013	DJ Bay Bay, Rick Ross, T-Pain	Bay Bay Day 2013
"Lame"	2013	David Sabastian, Louie V Mob	Napoleon Complex
"Ugly But She Fine"	2013	Kevin Gates	The Luca Brasi Story
"Like Whaat Remix"	2013	Problem, Chris Brown, Tyga, Wiz Khalifa	—N/a
"Man Down"	2014	Alley Boy, Al Doe	Definition Of F*ck Shit 3
"Mile Away"	2014	Clyde Carson	Playboy
"Bad Lil Breezy"	2014	Cognito	Spoiled Milk
"Bout It Bout It"	2014	XAV	Zeeky
"Feel Special"	2015	BlaqNmilD	The Becoming
"Handle That"	2015	BlaqNmilD	The Becoming
"Black Bandana"	2015	Eastwood, BlaqNmilD	Black Bandana: Trapper Of The Year
"Foreigns"	2015	Eastwood, BlaqNmilD	Black Bandana: Trapper Of The Year
"Street Corner"	2015	Eastwood, Maine Musik, T.E.C.	Black Bandana: Trapper Of The Year
"F' Em"	2015	She Money	Colombiana
"Family"	2015	She Money	Colombiana
"Grind"	2015	She Money	Colombiana
"Pressure"	2015	She Money, Maine Musik	Colombiana
"Wodie Remix"	2015	Turk	Get Money Stay Real 2
"Master P Intro"	2015	Rich The Kid	Flexin On Purpose
"Interlude: The Glory Is in You"	2016	Solange	A Seat at the Table
"Interlude: This Moment"	2016	Solange, Kelsey Lu, Sampha, Dev Hynes	A Seat at the Table
"Interlude: For Us by Us"	2016	Solange	A Seat at the Table
"Interlude: No Limits"	2016	Solange	A Seat at the Table
"Interlude: Pedestals"	2016	Solange	A Seat at the Table
"Closing: The Chosen Ones"	2016	Solange	A Seat at the Table
