= Ooh Wee (disambiguation) =

"Ooh Wee" is a 2003 song by Mark Ronson.

Ooh Wee may also refer to:

- "Ooh Wee", a song by LL Cool J from the 2006 album Todd Smith
- "Ooh Wee", a single by American pop musician Aaron Carter featuring rapper Pat SoLo

== See also ==
- "Ooohhhwee", a song by Master P from his 2001 album Game Face
- "Oo-Wee", a song by Ringo Starr from his 1974 album Goodnight Vienna
- "OooWee", a song by Rapsody from her 2017 album Laila's Wisdom
- "Ohh Wee", a song by Cru from the 1999 album Violator: The Album
- "Ohh, Ohh Wee", a 1954 song by Earl Forest
