= Featuring...Master P =

Featuring Master P

Compilation album by Master P
- Released: August 14, 2007
- Genre: Southern hip hop, gangsta rap
- Label: PCT

Master P chronology
America's Most Luved Bad Guy (2006)	Featuring Master P (2007)	Hip Hop History (2007)

Professional ratings
Review scores
Source	Rating
AllMusic	3.5/5 stars
PopMatters	3/5 stars

Featuring Master P is a 2007 compilation album by Master P. It was released on 14 August 2007 and contains many songs that he was featured on during his time on No Limit Records.

== Track listing ==
No.	Title	Length
1.	"Hook It Up" (featuring Bone Thug-N-Harmony & Silkk The Shocker)	2:53
2.	"Ice On My WristRemix" (featuring Magic)	3:17
3.	"Soldiers, Riders And G's" (featuring Snoop Dogg, Silkk The Shocker & Mystikal)	4:34
4.	"How Ya Do Dat" (featuring C-Loc & Young Bleed)	4:28
5.	"You Know I'm A Ho" (featuring Ice Cube)	4:17
6.	"No Limit Soldiers" (featuring Silkk The Shocker, Mo B. Dick & C-Murder)	7:03
7.	"Made Niggaz" (featuring Mack 10 & Mystikal)	3:18
8.	"Hoody Hoo" (featuring C-Murder & Silkk The Shocker)	3:25
9.	"Da Ballers" (featuring Jermaine Dupri)	3:02
10.	"Thug Girl" (featuring Snoop Dogg & Silkk The Shocker)	3:12
11.	"Weed And Money" (featuring Silkk The Shocker)	4:04
12.	"Pure Uncut" (featuring Mystikal, Silkk The Shocker & Psycho Drama)	4:39
13.	"Make 'Em Say Ugh" (featuring Fiend, Silkk The Shocker, Mia X & Mystikal)	5:05
14.	"Gangstafied" (featuring Mo B. Dick & Kane And Abel)	5:20
15.	"Major Players" (featuring Mia X, Silkk The Shocker & Porsha)	4:10
16.	"Freak Hoes" (featuring Silkk The Shocker & Mia X)	3:48
17.	"I'm Bout It, Bout It" (featuring Mia X)	5:30
18.	"Foolish" (featuring Mo B. Dick & Magic)	4:05
