= West Coast Bad Boyz II =

1997 compilation album

Compilation album by various artists
- Released: January 28, 1997
- Recorded: 1996
- Genres: West Coast hip-hop; gangsta rap
- Length: 1:12:19
- Labels: No Limit; Priority
- Producers: Binky Mack; Brotha Lynch Hung; CMT; Cellski; Chess; Craig B; DJ Daryl; E-A-Ski; Gangsta; Homicide; JT the Bigga Figga; K-Lou; KLC; Khayree; MC Eiht; Mo B. Dick; Premiere Music; Stro

No Limit compilations chronology
Down South Hustlers: Bouncin' and Swingin' (1995)	West Coast Bad Boyz II (1997)	I'm Bout It (1997)

Professional ratings
Review scores
Source	Rating
AllMusic	3/5 stars
RapReviews	5/10

West Coast Bad Boyz II is the fourth compilation album by American hip-hop record label No Limit Records and the third compilation in its West Coast Bad Boyz series. It was released on January 28, 1997 via Priority Records, serving as the sequel to 1994's West Coast Bad Boyz, Vol. 1: Anotha Level of the Game.

Production was handled by Craig B, K-Lou, Premiere Music, Binky Mack, Brotha Lynch Hung, CMT, Cellski, Chess, DJ Daryl, E-A-Ski, Gangsta, Homicide, JT the Bigga Figga, KLC, Khayree, MC Eiht, Mo B. Dick, Stro and Black C. It features contributions from Master P, 11/5, AllFrumThaI, Baldhead Rick, Brotha Lynch Hung, C-Bo, Cellski, C-Murder, D-Dubb, E-A-Ski, Get Low Playaz, Homicide, Loki, Lunasicc, Mac Dre, Marvaless, MC Eiht, Mr. Serv-On, Phonk Beta, Rappin' 4-Tay, RBL Posse, S.B., Silkk the Shocker, Tha Gamblaz, The Comrads, The Delinquents, Tru and Westside Connection.

It was a success, peaking at number 8 on the Billboard 200 and number 6 on the Top R&B/Hip-Hop Albums. Both the album and its opening song were dedicated to the memory of Tupac Shakur. It was certified Gold by the Recording Industry Association of America on April 8, 1997 for the sales of 500,000 units in the US alone.

== Track listing ==
No.	Title	Writer(s)	Producer(s)	Length
1.	"R.I.P. Tupac" (performed by Master P)	Percy Miller	KLC	5:05
2.	"Bangin'" (performed by Master P and Westside Connection)	O'Shea Jackson; Dedrick Rolison; William Calhoun	K-Lou	5:22
3.	"Survival 1st" (performed by C-Bo, Lunasicc and Marvaless)	Shawn Thomas; Monterrio Williams; Marva Jean Cooks II	DJ Darryl	4:19
4.	"Tryin 2 Make Ends" (performed by 11/5)	Dante Casey; Paris Robinson; Jermaine Phillips	Premier Music	3:46
5.	"Datz What I Said" (performed by Brotha Lynch Hung, Loki, D. Dubb and Phonk Beta)	Kevin Mann	Brotha Lynch Hung	4:07
6.	"Got Tha Best Hand" (performed by The Comrads and AllFrumThaI)	Terrell Anderson; Kelly Garmon; Ryan Garner; Marcus Moore	Binky Mack; Gangsta	3:11
7.	"Up's and Down's" (performed by Rappin' 4-Tay)	Anthony Forté	Premier Music	3:31
8.	"Bad Boyz on a Mission" (performed by Tru)	P. Miller; Vyshonn Miller; Edward Lee Knight	K-Lou	4:52
9.	"Call It What You Want" (performed by RBL Posse)	Christopher Matthews; Ricky Herd	Black-C	4:07
10.	"Img" (performed by E-A-Ski)	Shon Adams; Mark Ogleton	E-A-Ski; CMT	3:40
11.	"Roll Yo Voges" (performed by Cellski, Baldhead Rick and S.B.)	Marcel Wade	Cellski; Chess	3:25
12.	"What Cha Like" (performed by Mac Dre)	Andre Hicks	Khayree	3:23
13.	"Mr. Dayton" (performed by Homicide)	Josey Moore	Stro; Homicide	3:16
14.	"Hands on My Four 5" (performed by Silkk the Shocker)	V. Miller	Craig B.	3:30
15.	"The Unexpected" (performed by Get Low Playaz and Tha Gamblaz)	Get Low Playaz	JT the Bigga Figga	4:56
16.	"A Dead Man (Commercial)" (performed by Mr. Serv-On)	Corey Smith	Craig B.	1:37
17.	"Paper Chasing" (performed by MC Eiht)	Aaron Tyler	MC Eiht	3:50
18.	"Breakin' Skrill" (performed by The Delinquents)	Glen Jones; Vidal Prevost		2:41
19.	"Steady Mobbin'" (performed by C-Murder)	Corey Miller	Mo B. Dick	3:41
Total length:				1:12:19

== Certifications ==
Region	Certification	Certified units/sales
United States (RIAA)	Gold	500,000^{^}
^{^} Shipments figures based on certification alone.
