= America's Most Luved Bad Guy =

Compilation album by Master P
- Released: March 21, 2006
- Recorded: 2005−2006
- Genres: Gangsta rap, Southern hip hop, hip hop
- Label: GoDigital Media Group

Master P chronology
Living Legend: Certified D-Boy (2005)	America's Most Luved Bad Guy (2006)	Featuring Master P (2007)

America's Most Luved Bad Guy is a compilation of Master P tracks released exclusively for digital purchase through online, digital retailers such as iTunes and Amazon in April, 2006. The 12-track set includes 6 brand new tracks, the first 6 on the record, 5 of which feature the Colonel Master P. Tracks 7–12 were pulled from previous Master P releases "The Ghetto Bill Vol. 1: The Best Hustler in the Game" and "Living Legend: Certified D-Boy," both of which hit stores a year earlier in 2005.

== Track listing ==
No.	Title	Length
1.	"B and W"	4:48
2.	"On Them"	4:13
3.	"I'm Shinin"	3:32
4.	"West to the Dirty"	4:16
5.	"Problems"	4:28
6.	"Get Stupid"	4:37
7.	"Money"	3:51
8.	"Rock Wit U"	3:38
9.	"Gangsta"	3:12
10.	"Shake Yours"	3:57
11.	"Let Me"	4:20
12.	"Cookie"	3:15
