= Mercedes (singer) =

American singer-songwriter

- Born: Raequel Miller; May 1, 1978 (age 48); Detroit, Michigan, U.S.
- Origin: New Orleans, Louisiana, U.S.
- Genres: Hip hop, Southern hip hop, R&B, hip hop soul
- Occupations: Singer; rapper
- Instrument: Vocals
- Years active: 1997–present
- Labels: No Limit; Priority

Raequel Miller (born May 1, 1978), better known by her stage name Mercedes, is an American singer, rapper and R&B recording artist based in Detroit, Michigan. She is best known for being signed to No Limit Records.

== Music career ==
On May 29, 1999, during an interview Mercedes discussed how she got signed to No Limit, clarifying she was born and raised in Detroit, Michigan, and was in her second year at Xavier University in New Orleans when No Limit group Kane & Abel saw her perform Shirley Murdock's "As We Lay" in a talent show. Impressed by her performance, the No Limit group invited Mercedes to join them in the studio, where she subsequently met No Limit owner Master P. The label CEO asked her to sing "and I’ve been with them ever since" stated Mercedes. On June 29, 1999, Mercedes would release her debut album entitled Rear End it would be released on Master P's No Limit Records; as was typical for No Limit's releases at the time, the album featured other No Limit performing artists such as Mystikal, Mac, Mia X, Silkk the Shocker and Master P. Rear End was reasonably successful, peaking at No. 34 on the Billboard 200 and No. 12 on the Top R&B/Hip-Hop Albums charts. After releasing the album, Mercedes reportedly retired from the music business less than a year later to attend law school.

== Discography ==
=== Studio albums ===
List of studio albums, with selected chart positions
Title	Album details	Peak chart positions	
Title	Album details	US	US R&B
Rear End	Released: June 29, 1999; Label: No Limit, Priority; Format: CD, LP, cassette, digital download	72	12

=== Soundtrack albums ===
List of soundtrack albums, with selected chart positions and certifications
Title	Album details	Peak chart positions		Certifications
Title	Album details	US	US R&B	Certifications
I'm Bout It (with various artists)	Released: May 13, 1997; Label: No Limit, Priority; Formats: CD, LP, cassette, digital download	4	1	RIAA: 2× Platinum

=== Singles ===
==== As lead artist ====
Title	Year	Peak chart positions			Album
Title	Year	US	US R&B	US Rap	Album
"It's Your Thing" (featuring Master P and Ms. Peaches)	1999	71	12	4	Rear End
"N's Ain't Shit" (featuring Mia X)	1999	—	—	—	Rear End
"I Can Tell" (504 Boyz featuring Mercedes, Ms. Peaches, Mac and Jamo)	2000	—	—	—	Goodfellas and Rear End

==== As featured artist ====
Title	Year	Peak chart positions			Album
Title	Year	US	US R&B	US Rap	Album
"I Can Tell" (504 Boyz featuring Mercedes, Ms. Peaches, Mac and Jamo)	2000	—	—	—	Goodfellas and Rear End

==== Collaboration singles ====
Title	Year	Peak chart positions			Album
Title	Year	US	US R&B	US Rap	Album
"Crazy Bout Ya" (Master P featuring Mercedes and Ms. Peaches)	1999	—	—	—	Only God Can Judge Me and Rear End
