= The Ghettos Tryin to Kill Me! =

Studio album by Master P
- Released: May 24, 1994
- Recorded: 1993–1994
- Genres: Gangsta rap, mobb
- Length: 65:12
- Label: No Limit
- Producers: Master P (executive producer), Bigg Nate, Larry D. Henderson, JT The Bigga Figga, Ski & Cmt

Master P chronology
Mama's Bad Boy (1992)	The Ghettos Tryin to Kill Me! (1994)	99 Ways to Die (1995)

Professional ratings
Review scores
Source	Rating
AllMusic	3/5 stars

The Ghettos Tryin' to Kill Me! is the third studio album by Master P, released on May 24, 1994, by No Limit Records and then later re-released in 1997 as a limited edition under Priority Records. The re-released album has King George and Rev. Do Wrong edited out, with some tracks removed altogether, but the 1997 limited edition also has two added bonus tracks that are not found on the 1994 release. The album sold more than 200,000 copies.

== Track listing ==
The Ghettos Tryin to Kill Me!

Original version
No.	Title	Length
1.	"Intro"	00:12
2.	"Some of These Hoes Jack" (featuring King George & Lil Ric)	04:38
3.	"Late Night Creepin'" (featuring Big Ed)	04:25
4.	"Playa Haterz" (featuring JT The Bigga Figga & San Quinn)	05:17
5.	"Somethin' Funky for the Street"	03:18
6.	"Commercial"	02:33
7.	"Any Thing Goes"	04:59
8.	"Study Being for a Gangsta" (featuring King George)	04:02
9.	"The Ghetto's Tryin' to Kill Me!" (featuring Silkk The Shocker)	04:37
10.	"Bastard Child"	04:55
11.	"Just an Everyday Thang" (featuring C-Murder)	05:08
12.	"Commercial Rev Intro"	01:24
13.	"Rev. Do Wrong" (featuring TRU)	03:37
14.	"Hands of Dead Man"	04:41
15.	"211" (featuring Sonya C)	04:03
16.	"No Limit Party"	07:10

Re-release
No.	Title	Length
1.	"Intro"	0:11
2.	"The Ghettos Tryin' to Kill Me!"	4:09
3.	"Always Look A Man In The Eyes (Bonus Track)" (featuring C-Murder, Mystikal, & Silkk The Shocker)	5:06
4.	"Anything Goes"	3:09
5.	"Late Night Creepin'"	4:14
6.	"I Got The Dank"	2:31
7.	"Robbery (Bonus Track)" (C-Murder)	3:31
8.	"Playa Haterz"	3:36
9.	"Some Jack"	3:57
10.	"Something For The Street"	3:18
11.	"Bastard Child"	2:29
12.	"Hands Of A Dead Man"	2:50
13.	"211"	4:01
14.	"Just An Everyday Thang"	3:12
15.	"No Limit Party"	3:58
