= Good Side, Bad Side (Master P album) =

Studio album by Master P
- Released: March 23, 2004
- Recorded: 2003–2004
- Genre: Hip-hop
- Length: 1:15:29
- Labels: The New No Limit; Koch
- Producers: DJ Darryl; Full Pack; Lil' Jon; Myke Diesel; Serious; XL

Master P chronology
Game Face (2001)	Good Side, Bad Side (2004)	Ghetto Bill (2005)

Professional ratings
Review scores
Source	Rating
AllMusic	3/5 stars
RapReviews	6/10
The New Rolling Stone Album Guide	2/5 stars
USA Today	2.5/4 stars

Good Side, Bad Side is the eleventh solo studio album by American rapper Master P. It was released on March 23, 2004, by The New No Limit and Koch Records. Production was handled by Lil' Jon, Myke Diesel, DJ Daryl, Full Pack Music, Serious and XL. It features guest appearances from Afficial, C-Murder, Curren$y, Dujuan Baham, Liberty, Lil' Jon, Lil' Romeo, Silkk the Shocker, Souya, Theresa Esclovon and Vellqwan.

In the United States, the album peaked at number 11 on the Billboard 200, number 3 on the Top R&B/Hip-Hop Albums and atop the Independent Albums charts.

== Background ==
After the New No Limit's deal with Universal Records expired a year earlier, P signed his company to a partnership with the independent Koch Records. Good Side, Bad Side was a moderate success. The double-disc album debuted at number 11 on the US Billboard 200 with nearly 42,135 copies sold in its first week in sales. Debuting on the charts in March 2004, it was Master P's highest position on the chart since his 1999 album Only God Can Judge Me debuted at number two.

== Track listing ==
CD 1: Good Side
No.	Title	Producer(s)	Length
1.	"Act a Fool" (featuring Lil' Jon)	Lil' Jon	3:50
2.	"Com. 1" (featuring C-Murder)		0:16
3.	"We All We Got"	Myke Diesel	1:20
4.	"Who Want Some"	Myke Diesel	3:20
5.	"Let' Em Go" (featuring Curren$y)	Myke Diesel	3:45
6.	"Who Them Boyz" (featuring C-Murder, Lil' Jon and Liberty)	Lil' Jon	3:50
7.	"Why They Wanna Wish Death" (featuring Afficial)	Myke Diesel	4:48
8.	"You Don't Know Me" (featuring Vellqwan and Lil Romeo)	DJ Daryl	4:05
9.	"Anything Goes"	Myke Diesel	1:53
10.	"Com. 2"		0:57
11.	"It's a Drought" (featuring Afficial)	Myke Diesel	3:11
12.	"Them Jeans"	Myke Diesel	3:44

CD 2: Bad Side
No.	Title	Producer(s)	Length
13.	"Ghetto Honey" (featuring Theresa Esclovon)	Myke Diesel	3:39
14.	"That Ain't Nothing" (featuring Silkk the Shocker, Lil Romeo and Curren$y)	Full Pack	4:30
15.	"Ghetto Model" (featuring Theresa Esclovon)	Myke Diesel	2:36
16.	"Com. 3" (featuring Curren$y)		1:51
17.	"Tell' Em"	Myke Diesel	4:22
18.	"Ride 4 You" (featuring Afficial)	Myke Diesel	3:55
19.	"We Like Them Girlz" (featuring Silkk the Shocker and Curren$y)	Serious	2:09
20.	"20 on Cars 26 on Trucks" (featuring Curren$y, Lil Romeo and Liberty)	Myke Diesel	4:32
21.	"Thug and Get Paper" (featuring Silkk the Shocker)	XL	3:13
22.	"Com. 4" (featuring Djuan Baham)		1:52
23.	"Represent" (featuring Silkk the Shocker)	Myke Diesel	5:09
24.	"If" (featuring Souya and Curren$y)	Myke Diesel	2:57
Total length:			1:15:29

== Personnel ==
- Percy "Master P" Miller – vocals, executive producer
- Afficial – vocals (tracks: 7, 11, 18)
- Corey "C-Murder" Miller – vocals
- Shante "Curren$y" Franklin – vocals
- Dujuan Baham – vocals
- Liberty – vocals
- Jonathan "Lil' Jon" Smith – vocals & producer (tracks: 1, 6)
- Romeo Miller – vocals
- Vyshonn "Silkk the Shocker" Miller – vocals
- Abby Souya – vocals
- Theresa Esclovon – vocals
- Vellqwan – vocals
- Daryl L. "DJ Darryl" Anderson – producer
- Full Pack – producer
- Michael "Myke Diesel" Robinson – producer, engineering, mixing
- Cleveland "Serious" Delaney Jr. – producer
- Donald "XL" Robertson – producer
- Tim Alexander – design, photography, layout

== Charts ==
=== Weekly charts ===
Chart (2004)	Peak position
US Billboard 200	11
US Top R&B/Hip-Hop Albums (Billboard)	3
US Independent Albums (Billboard)	1

=== Year-end charts ===
Chart (2004)	Position
US Top R&B/Hip-Hop Albums (Billboard)	84
US Top Independent Albums (Billboard)	11
