= Mama's Bad Boy =

Studio album by Master P
- Released: 1992
- Studio: K-Lou
- Genre: Hip-hop
- Length: 50:18
- Labels: No Limit; In-A-Minute
- Producers: CMT; E-A-Ski; Master P

Master P chronology
Get Away Clean (1991)	Mama's Bad Boy (1992)	The Ghettos Tryin to Kill Me! (1994)

Singles from Mama's Bad Boy
- 1. "I'm Going Big Time" Released: 1992; 2. "Trust No Body" Released: 1993

Mama's Bad Boy is the second solo studio album by American rapper Master P. It was released in 1992, via No Limit/In-A-Minute Records. Recorded at K-Lou Studio, it was produced by E-A-Ski & CMT and Master P, who also served as executive producer. It features contributions from E-A-Ski and TRU. The album spawned two singles: "I'm Going Big Time" and "Trust No Body". It also Master P's final album released for In-A-Minute as No Limit would later be distributed by Priority.

== Critical reception ==
Professional ratings
Review scores
Source	Rating
AllMusic	1.5/5 stars
RapReviews	5/10
The Rolling Stone Album Guide	2/5 stars

Jason Birchmeier of AllMusic highlighted the album's influence from California gangsta rap groups, mainly N.W.A. Steve 'Flash' Juon of RapReviews described the album as "an easily forgettable album that gives no insight into the worldwide phenomenon that No Limit Records would soon become", adding that "even diehard Master P fans can skip this release." In his book Third Coast: Outkast, Timbaland, and How Hip-hop Became a Southern Thing, Roni Sarig wrote that the album "fared much better".

== Track listing ==
No.	Title	Length
1.	"Shoot 'Em Up"	4:31
2.	"Psycho Rhymes"	3:12
3.	"Bloody Murder"	4:06
4.	"Fuck a Bitch Cuz I'm Paid"	3:24
5.	"Eyes of a Killer"	2:25
6.	"I'm Going Big Time"	3:56
7.	"Mama's Bad Boy"	3:36
8.	"Ooh Shit"	2:46
9.	"Watch Your Ass"	4:58
10.	"Premeditated Murder"	3:05
11.	"Dope, Pussy and Money"	4:58
12.	"Rich and Dangerous" (T.R.U.)	1:54
13.	"Trust No Body" (featuring E-A-Ski)	4:13
14.	"Shouts"	3:14
Total length:		50:18

== Personnel ==
- Percy "Master P" Miller – vocals, producer, executive producer
- Eddie K – background vocals
- Shon "E-A-Ski" Adams – producer
- Mark "CMT" Ogleton – producer
- Ken Franklin – engineering
- Curtis – engineering assistant
- Alan Lewellyn – photography
- Donald Hogan – photography

== Sources ==
- Sarig, Roni (2007). Third Coast: Outkast, Timbaland, and How Hip-hop Became a Southern Thing. Hachette Books. p. 81. ISBN 9780306814303.
