= 99 Ways to Die (album) =

Studio album by Master P
- Released: February 7, 1995
- Studio: SMG Studios; K-Lou Studios; One Little Indian Studios; Pajamas Studio
- Genre: Gangsta rap
- Length: 51:51
- Label: No Limit
- Producer: Al Eaton; CMT; E-A-Ski; K-Lou; Larry D; Lil Ric; Master P

Master P chronology
The Ghettos Tryin to Kill Me! (1994)	99 Ways to Die (1995)	Ice Cream Man (1996)

Singles from 99 Ways to Die
- 1. "When They Gone" Released: February 28, 1995

Professional ratings
Review scores
Source	Rating
AllMusic	2.5/5 stars

99 Ways to Die is the fourth studio album by American rapper Master P. It was released on February 7, 1995, through No Limit Records. Recording sessions took place at SMG Sound Studio, K-Lou Studios, One Little Indian Studios and Pajamas Studio. Production was handled by Al Eaton, Larry D, CMT, E-A-Ski, K-Lou, Lil Ric and Master P himself. It features guest appearances from King George, Silkk the Shocker, Big Ed, C-Murder, E-A-Ski, Lil Ric and Rally Ral. Supported by the only single "When They Gone", the album peaked at number 41 on the Billboard Top R&B/Hip-Hop Albums chart in the United States.

== Track listing ==
No.	Title	Writer(s)	Producer(s)	Length
1.	"Intro / 17 Reasons"	Percy Miller	Master P; Lil Ric	5:29
2.	"Commercial 1"			0:35
3.	"Dead Presidents"	P. Miller	K-Lou	5:00
4.	"Rollin' Thru My Hood" (featuring Big Ed, King George, Silkk the Shocker and Lil Ric)	P. Miller; Edward Lee Knight; George Butler; Vyshonn Miller; Richard McClinton	Al Eaton	4:51
5.	"Bullets Gots No Name" (featuring E-A-Ski and Rally Ral)	P. Miller; Shon Adams; Riley Laws, Jr.	E-A-Ski; CMT	4:38
6.	"When They Gone"	P. Miller	Al Eaton	6:24
7.	"Playa Wit Game" (featuring Silkk the Shocker and King George)	P. Miller	Al Eaton	4:48
8.	"Commercial 2"			0:32
9.	"99 Ways to Die"	P. Miller	Larry D	3:43
10.	"Rev. Do Wrong Comm"			1:32
11.	"Hoe Games" (featuring C-Murder, Silkk the Shocker and King George)	P. Miller	Master P	4:33
12.	"1-900-Master P" (Bonus Track)	P. Miller	Larry D	4:45
13.	"When They Gone" (Radio)	P. Miller	Al Eaton	5:01
Total length:				51:51

== Personnel ==
- Percy "Master P" Miller – vocals, producer (tracks: 1, 11), executive producer
- Edward Lee "Big Ed" Knight – vocals (track 4)
- George L. "King George" Butler – vocals (tracks: 4, 7, 11)
- Vyshonn "Silkk the Shocker" Miller – vocals (tracks: 4, 7, 11)
- Richard "Lil Ric" McClinton – vocals (track 4), producer (track 1)
- Shon "E-A-Ski" Adams – vocals, producer, recording & mixing (track 5)
- Riley "Rally Ral" Laws Jr. – vocals (track 5)
- Corey "C-Murder" Miller – vocals (track 11)
- Ken "K-Lou" Franklin – producer (track 3)
- Alfred "Baby Jesus" Eaton – producer (tracks: 4, 6, 7, 13)
- Mark "CMT" Ogleton – producer, recording & mixing (track 5)
- Larry D. Henderson – producer (tracks: 9, 12), recording & mixing (tracks: 1, 9, 11, 12)
- Saint Charles Thurman – recording & mixing (tracks: 1, 9, 11, 12)
- Ken Lee – recording & mixing (track 3)
- Tony Smith – photography

== Charts ==
Chart (1995)	Peak position
US Top R&B/Hip-Hop Albums (Billboard)	41
