= Empire, from the Hood to Hollywood =

Studio album by Master P
- Released: November 27, 2015
- Recorded: 2013–15
- Genre: Hip-hop
- Labels: No Limit Forever; Globy House; Fontana
- Producers: Master P (exec.); BlaqNmilD (also exec.)

Master P chronology
The Gift (2013)	Empire, from the Hood to Hollywood (2015)	The Grind Don't Stop (2016)

Empire, from the Hood to Hollywood is the fifteenth studio album by American rapper Master P. The album was released on November 27, 2015, by No Limit Forever and Globy House Records. The album features guest appearances from Lil Wayne, Maserati Rome,Krazy and Ace B.

== Background ==
On October 13, 2015, Master P would reveal & announced the cover art, release date & track list to his upcoming new album entitled Empire that will be released on November 28, 2015.

On November 22, 2015, Master P's label No Limit Forever would announce that the limited Deluxe edition of Master P's fourteenth album Empire, from the Hood to Hollywood would include a Limited Edition Autographed Empire, from the Hood to Hollywood album signed by Master P valued at $99, a High Fashion T-shirt retailed for $149.00, an Exclusive membership to the No Limit Fan Club a $99 value & a Lottery Ticket with the chance to win the $10,000 grand prize. The proceeds from the sales will serve as donations to purchase the gifts and toys which will be distributed for the Christmas toy drives to underprivileged kids stating:

Join Master P and No Limit in giving back as proceeds from the much anticipated album Empire, from the Hood to Hollywood, will be used to purchase gifts and toys for families in need. Not only can you purchase some great music but you can also make a donation to make a difference. Master P is using his gift of music as a way of giving back. Kids are the future. With the holidays approaching and times being the way they are, many families will not be able to provide their children with gifts this Christmas. The holidays are a time for giving back, and what better way to do it than by joining Master P as he will be putting together, toy drives for underprivileged children this holiday season. Master P has been giving back for over 20 years and understands the importance of giving back to help kids in underprivileged, families and communities.

== Singles ==
On November 19, 2015, a music video was filmed and released for the track "Werk".

== Track listing ==
Empire, from the Hood to Hollywood – Standard version
No.	Title	Writer(s)	Producer(s)	Length
1.	"The Life I Chose"	Percy Miller	BlaqNmilD	4:45
2.	"Freaky (She's Freaky)"	Percy Miller	BlaqNmilD	3:11
3.	"Hood to Hollywood" (featuring Money Mafia)	Percy Miller; Money Mafia	BlaqNmilD	3:58
4.	"Goin Thru It"	Percy Miller	BlaqNmilD	4:12
5.	"All I Want" (featuring Lil Wayne)	Percy Miller; Dwayne Michael Carter, Jr.	BlaqNmilD	5:56
6.	"Ridin" (featuring Krazy & BlaqNmilD)	Percy Miller; Michael Wilson; BlaqNmilD	BlaqNmilD	4:38
7.	"Green"	Percy Miller		4:33
8.	"She Whip It Up" (featuring BlaqNmilD)	Percy Miller; BlaqNmilD	BlaqNmilD	3:03
9.	"I Don't" (featuring Money Mafia)	Percy Miller; Money Mafia	BlaqNmilD	4:13
10.	"U Think I Forgot" (featuring BlaqNmilD & Maserati Rome)	Percy Miller; BlaqNmilD; Percy Romeo Miller, Jr.	BlaqNmilD	4:44
11.	"We Don't Stop" (featuring Ace B & Dark Fame)	Percy Miller; Ace B; Dark Fame	BlaqNmilD	4:21
12.	"Make It" (featuring BlaqNmilD)	Percy Miller; BlaqNmilD	BlaqNmilD	2:53
13.	"Trappin" (featuring Ace B & BlaqNmilD)	Percy Miller; Ace B; BlaqNmilD	BlaqNmilD	2:46
14.	"No Strings Attached" (featuring Ace B)	Percy Miller; Ace B	BlaqNmilD	3:11
15.	"Werk" (featuring Ace B & Magnolia Chop)	Percy Miller; Ace B	BlaqNmilD	2:43

iTunes bonus track's
No.	Title	Writer(s)	Producer(s)	Length
16.	"Yeah" (featuring Money Mafia)	Percy Miller; Money Mafia	BlaqNmilD	3:21
17.	"Stay to Myself" (featuring Ace B, BlaqNMild, Flight Boy, Gangsta, Calliope Popeye & Maserati Rome)	Percy Miller; Money Mafia	BlaqNmilD	4:17
18.	"Never" (featuring Magnolia Chop, Luccianos & Maserati Rome)	Percy Miller; Magnolia Chop; Luccianos; Percy Romeo Miller, Jr.	BlaqNmilD	3:25
19.	"On My Mind" (featuring Luccianos & Ace B)	Percy Miller; Luccianos; Ace B	BlaqNmilD	5:02
