= Ice Cream Man (album) =

Studio album by Master P
- Released: April 16, 1996
- Recorded: January 1996
- Studio: K-Lou Studios (Richmond, California)
- Genre: Hip-hop
- Length: 78:18
- Labels: No Limit; Priority
- Producers: Beats By the Pound, K-Lou, DJ Daryl

Master P chronology
99 Ways to Die (1995)	Ice Cream Man (1996)	Ghetto D (1997)

Singles from Ice Cream Man
- 1. "Mr. Ice Cream Man" Released: March 30, 1996; 2. "Bout It Bout It Pt ll" Released: May 7, 1996; 3. "No More Tears" Released: 1996

Professional ratings
Review scores
Source	Rating
AllMusic	4/5 stars
The Encyclopedia of Popular Music	3/5 stars
RapReviews	8/10
(The New) Rolling Stone Album Guide	2.5/5 stars
The Source	3/5 stars
The Village Voice	(choice cut)

Ice Cream Man is the fifth album by the American rapper Master P. According to Master P the album was recorded in one week. It was released on April 16, 1996. Ice Cream Man peaked at No. 6 on the Billboard Top R&B Albums chart and No. 26 on the Billboard 200. The track "The Ghetto Won't Change" was not included on the 2005 re-issue.

== Track listing ==
No.	Title	Length
1.	"Intro"	2:50
2.	"Mr. Ice Cream Man" (featuring Silkk the Shocker, Mia X & Mo B. Dick)	5:08
3.	"Time for a 187"	4:08
4.	"1/2 on a Bag of Dank"	3:17
5.	"Break 'Em Off Somethin'" (featuring UGK)	4:42
6.	"How G's Ride" (featuring Big Ed & Silkk the Shocker)	3:54
7.	"No More Tears" (featuring Mo B. Dick)	3:42
8.	"The Ghetto Won't Change" (featuring Mo B. Dick)	3:49
9.	"Commercial"	1:09
10.	"Playa from Around the Way" (featuring Mo B. Dick & Silkk the Shocker)	4:54
11.	"Sellin' Ice Cream" (featuring Mo B. Dick)	3:50
12.	"Time to Check My Crackhouse"	4:09
13.	"'Bout It Bout It 2" (featuring Mia X)	5:09
14.	"Back Up Off Me"	5:13
15.	"Never Ending Game"	4:58
16.	"Watch Dees Hoes" (featuring Mr. Serv-On, Silkk the Shocker, Mo B. Dick & Tre-8)	3:20
17.	"Bout That Drama" (featuring Silkk The Shocker)	4:00
18.	"Killer Pussy"	3:49
19.	"Things Ain't What They Used to Be" (featuring Mo B. Dick)	3:55
20.	"My Ghetto Heroes" (featuring Skull Duggery)	4:44

== Charts ==
=== Weekly charts ===
Chart (1996)	Peak position
US Billboard 200	25
US Top R&B/Hip-Hop Albums (Billboard)	3

=== Year-end charts ===
Chart (1996)	Position
US Billboard 200	193
US Top R&B/Hip-Hop Albums (Billboard)	34
Chart (1997)	Position
US Top R&B/Hip-Hop Albums (Billboard)	79

== Certifications ==
Region	Certification	Certified units/sales
United States (RIAA)	Platinum	1,000,000^{^}
^{^} Shipments figures based on certification alone.
