= West Coast Bad Boyz, Vol. 1: Anotha Level of the Game =

Compilation album by various artists
- Released: August 9, 1994
- Recorded: 1994
- Studios: Bayview Studios; The Get Low Lab; Find Away Studio; Rag Top Studio; SMG Studio; K-Lou; Keylo Studios; Mob Boss Studio
- Genre: Hip-hop
- Length: 1:01:16
- Label: No Limit
- Producers: Cellski; Cyrus Esteban; Dangerous Dame; D-Jay Hook; Franky J; JT the Bigga Figga; Keylo; Kie; Larry D; Lil' Ric; Master P; Mike D; Silkk the Shocker; T.C.; Young Biz

No Limit Records compilations chronology
West Coast Bad Boyz, Vol. 1: Anotha Level of the Game (1994)	West Coast Bad Boyz: High fo Xmas (1994)

Professional ratings
Review scores
Source	Rating
AllMusic	3/5 stars

West Coast Bad Boyz, Vol. 1: Anotha Level of the Game is the first compilation album by American hip-hop record label No Limit Records, released on August 9, 1994.

Recording sessions took place at Bayview Studios, The Get Low Lab, Find Away Studio, Rag Top Studio, SMG Studio, K-Lou, Keylo Studios and Mob Boss Studio. Production was handled by Master P, who also served as executive producer, Cellski, Larry D, Kie, Cyrus Esteban, Dangerous Dame, D-Jay Hook, Franky J, JT the Bigga Figga, Keylo, Lil' Ric, Mike D, Silkk the Shocker, T.C., and Young Biz. It features contributions from Master P, Dangerous Dame, JT the Bigga Figga, Keylo, King George, Lil' Ric, Rappin' 4-Tay, Ray Luv and the Link Crew, The Delinquents, Brotha Moe, C-Bo, Cougnut, DT, Dre Dog, Erase-E, E.Z.S.D., Herm, Mac Spoon, Mr. Brainey, Pee, Rack Skerz, RBL Posse, San Quinn, Seff Tha Gaffla, The Dangla, The Perk, Toby T, Totally Insane, T.R.U. and UNLV.

The album was re-issued on July 22, 1997, omitting two songs ("Locked Up" and "Peace 2 Da Streets") due to Master P and King George's feud. The compilation peaked at the number-one spot on the Top R&B/Hip-Hop Catalog Albums chart.

== Track listing ==
No.	Title	Writer(s)	Producer(s)	Length
1.	"Intro" (performed by Herm)	Andre Lewis	Young Cellski	1:49
2.	"What We Known Fo" (performed by JT the Bigga Figga, Seff Tha Gaffla, Brotha Moe, The Dangla, San Quinn and Rack Skerz)	Joseph Thompson; Brotha Moe; Quincy Brooks	JT the Bigga Figga	5:42
3.	"Tryin' to Make a Dollar Out of 15 Cents" (performed by Master P and R.B.L.)	Percy Miller; R.B.L.	Master P	4:08
4.	"Deep" (performed by The Delinquents and DT)	Vidal Prevost; Glenn Jones; DT	D-Jay Hook; Mike D	4:14
5.	"You Do Your Thang" (performed by Rappin' 4-Tay)	Anthony Forté	Cyrus Esteban; Franky J	3:55
6.	"Total Insanity" (performed by Totally Insane, Dre Dog and Pee)	Phillip Allen; Adam Hicks	T.C.	4:16
7.	"Another Level" (performed by Dangerous Dame)	Damon D. Edwards	Dangerous Dame; Kie; Master P	3:49
8.	"Would You Take a Bullet for Your Homie" (performed by T.R.U.)	Vyshonn King Miller; Edward Lee Knight	Kie; Silkk the Shocker; Master P	5:00
9.	"Born Hustlaz" (performed by Ray Luv and the Link Crew)	Raymond Tyson; Anthony Whitson; Terry Grinner; M. Darado	Young Biz	4:07
10.	"Headin' 4 the Jack" (performed by C-Bo and Master P)	Shawn Thomas; P. Miller	Larry Dee	5:02
11.	"Tell Me Something Good" (performed by Cougnut and Master P)	Ronald Fields	Young Cellski	3:11
12.	"Mobbin' Thru the Town" (performed by Lil' Ric and Mr. Brainey)	Richard McClinton	Lil' Ric	4:40
13.	"Stressed Out" (performed by Young Cellski and UNLV)	Marcel Wade; S.B.; Shawnte Otis	Young Cellski	4:10
14.	"Locked Up" (performed by King George)	George L. Butler	Larry Dee
15.	"Playing for Keeps" (performed by Keylo)	Keylo	Keylo	2:58
16.	"Puttin' in Work" (performed by E.Z.S.D.)	E-Double Z; Skip Dog		4:15
17.	"Peace 2 da Streets" (performed by King George, Master P, Ray Luv, Dangerous Dame, Lil' Ric, JT the Bigga Figga, Mac Spoon, Rappin' 4-Tay, The Delinquents, Toby T, The Perk, Erase E and Keylo)	Butler; P. Miller; Tyson; Edwards; McClinton; Thompson; Mac Spoon; Forté; Prevost; Jones; Toby Thurman; The Perk; Earl Allen; Keylo	Larry Dee; Master P
Total length:				1:01:16

== Personnel ==
- Andre Herm Lewis – performer (track 1)
- Joseph "JT the Bigga Figga" Thompson – performer (tracks: 2, 17), producer & engineering (track 2)
- Yusef "Seff Tha Gaffla" Sterling – performer (track 2)
- Brotha Moe – performer (track 2)
- Ramadan "The Dangla" Smith – performer (track 2)
- Quincy "San Quinn" Brooks – performer (track 2)
- Rack Skerz – performer (track 2)
- Percy "Master P" Miller – performer (tracks: 3, 10, 11, 17), producer (tracks: 3, 7, 8, 17), executive producer
- RBL Posse – performer (track 3)
- Vidal "V-White" Prevost – performer (tracks: 4, 17)
- Glenn "G-Stack" Jones – performer (tracks: 4, 17)
- DT – performer (track 4)
- Anthony "Rappin' 4-Tay" Forté – performer (tracks: 5, 17)
- Phillip "Mac-10" Allen – performer (track 6)
- Adam "Ad Kapone" Hicks – performer (track 6)
- Andre "Dre Dog" Adams – performer (track 6)
- Paris "Pee" Robinson – performer (track 6)
- Damon "Dangerous Dame" Edwards – performer (tracks: 7, 17), producer (track 7)
- Vyshonn "Silkk the Shocker" Miller – performer & producer (track 8)
- Edward Lee "Big Ed" Knight – performer (track 8)
- Raymond "Ray Luv" Tyson – performer (tracks: 9, 17)
- Anthony "Ant Dog" Whitson – performer (track 9)
- Terry "Young Grin" Grinner – performer (track 9)
- Shawn "C-Bo" Thomas – performer (track 10)
- Ronald "Cougnut" Fields – performer (track 11)
- Richard "Lil Ric" McClinton – performer (tracks: 12, 17), producer (track 12)
- Mr. Brainey – performer (track 12)
- Marcel "Cellski" Wade – performer & engineering (track 13), producer (tracks: 1, 11, 13)
- Richard "Baldhead Rick" Isom – performer (track 13)
- S.B. – performer (track 13)
- George L. "King George" Butler – performer (tracks: 14, 17)
- Keylo – performer (tracks: 15, 17), producer (track 15)
- E-Double Z – performer (track 16)
- Skip Dog – performer (track 16)
- Mac Spoon – performer (track 17)
- Toby Thurman – performer (track 17)
- The Perk – performer (track 17)
- Earl "Erase E" Allen – performer (track 17)
- Uhuru Wright – backing vocals (track 8)
- Don "The Enhancer" Marsh – keyboards (tracks: 11, 13), engineering (tracks: 1, 3, 6, 11, 13)
- D-Jay Hook – producer (track 4)
- Michael "Mike D" Dinkins – producer (track 4)
- Cyrus Esteban – producer (track 5)
- Frank "Franky J" Hudson Jr. – producer & engineering (track 5)
- Tomie "T.C." Witherspoon – producer & engineering (track 6)
- Kie – producer (tracks: 7, 8)
- Young Biz – producer (track 9)
- Larry D. Henderson – producer (tracks: 10, 14, 17), engineering (tracks: 7–10, 17)
- Saint Charles Thurman – engineering (tracks: 7–10, 14, 17)
- Curtis – recording & mixing (track 12)
- Ken Franklin – recording & mixing (track 12)
- Mike Mosley – recording & engineering (track 16)
- Sam Bostic – recording & engineering (track 16)
- Ken Lee – mastering
- Tony Smith – photography
