= Ghetto Postage =

Studio album by Master P
- Released: November 28, 2000
- Recorded: 1999–2000
- Genre: Gangsta rap
- Length: 73:38
- Labels: No Limit; Priority
- Producers: Master P (exec.), Donald XL Robertson (exec.), Carlos Stephens, Ke'noe, Myke Diesel, Sugar Bear, Ezell Swang

Master P chronology
Only God Can Judge Me (1999)	Ghetto Postage (2000)	Game Face (2001)

Ghetto Postage is the ninth studio album by American rapper Master P. It was released on November 28, 2000, on No Limit Records and Priority Records in the United States. This is Master P's last album to be distributed by Priority. The album features Snoop Dogg, Tamar Braxton and Silkk the Shocker. The album included the singles "Bout Dat" featuring Silkk the Shocker and "Souljas". The album was mostly produced by Carlos Stephens and Donald XL Robertson along with Myke Diesel.

== Critical reception ==
Professional ratings
Aggregate scores
Source	Rating
Metacritic	57/100
Review scores
Source	Rating
AllMusic	3/5 stars
Entertainment Weekly	C+
HipHopDX	2/5 stars
RapReviews	6.5/10
Rolling Stone	3/5 stars

Ghetto Postage garnered mixed reviews from music critics, who were divided over the production and Master P's musical performance. At Metacritic, which assigns a normalized rating out of 100 to reviews from mainstream critics, the album received an average score of 57, based on 6 reviews.

Steve 'Flash' Juon of RapReviews gave note of the album's in-house production providing catchy bangers, sparse list of guest artists and Master P adopting different personas and limiting his "guttural moan of ghetto pain" on each track, concluding that "P sticks to themes and with 19 songs on the album, he has more than enough chance to get hot; he catches that heat on more than half. It's not a risky or an innovative album, but the fans of the Tank will keep rollin." AllMusic's Jason Birchmeier felt the record had an overlong track listing with many duds but found it much better than Only God Can Judge Me, giving praise to "Bout Dat", "I Don't Give Ah What" and "Souljas" as highlights and the framing of Master P in a more likable role, concluding that "[T]his doesn't necessarily make for good music, but it's one of the album's nicer qualities." Evan Serpick of Entertainment Weekly called the album an "overwrought gangsta package" for containing "stale rhymes and grooves", a lengthy hip-hop checklist, and all too brief bursts of humor to give the listeners relief from Master P's litany of lyrical assaults against former labelmates. A writer for HipHopDX criticized the record's production team for creating underwhelming beats that lack the punch found in Ghetto D and Master P's performance feeling uninspired and only there for both the gimmicky title and name value, concluding that, "Although some fans will surely enjoy Master P's newest it seems more likely that Ghetto Postage will only cause his fanbase to dwindle even further than it already has. He must be kicking himself at about this time, if only he hadn't dumped his old producers."

== Commercial performance ==
The single, "Bout Dat" featuring Silkk The Shocker, reached number eleven on the US Hot R&B/Hip Hop Singles & Tracks chart, selling 93,000 copies in its first week.

== Track listing ==
No.	Title	Producer(s)	Length
1.	"Intro" (featuring Erica Foxx)	Carlos Stephens	1:41
2.	"Bout Dat" (featuring Silkk The Shocker)	Carlos Stephens	3:21
3.	"Don Is Back (Skit)"	Carlos Stephens	0:28
4.	"Doo Rags" (featuring Short Circuit)	Donald XL Robertson	3:09
5.	"Bitch I Like"	Ezell Swang	3:12
6.	"My Three Uncles (Skit)"	Carlos Stephens	1:17
7.	"Golds in They Mouth" (featuring C-Murder)	Ke'Noe	4:15
8.	"Problems (Skit)"	Carlos Stephens	2:25
9.	"Poppin' Them Collars" (featuring Snoop Dogg & Kokane)	Fredwreck	4:47
10.	"I Don't Give Ah What"	Carlos Stephens	2:41
11.	"Twerk That Thang"	Carlos Stephens, Myke Diesel	2:55
12.	"Life I Live" (featuring Slay Sean)	Myke Diesel	4:14
13.	"Souljas"	Carlos Stephens, Ke'Noe, Donald XL Robertson, Suga Bear, Ezell Swang, Myke Diesel	3:32
14.	"The Real Nigga (Skit)"	Carlos Stephens	1:42
15.	"Pockets Gone' Stay Fat" (featuring Magic)	Suga Bear	3:41
16.	"My Babooski" (featuring Tamar Braxton)	Suga Bear	3:36
17.	"Still Ballin'" (featuring Krazy & Slay Sean)	Carlos Stephens	3:18
18.	"Soulja Boo" (featuring Erica Foxx)	Donald XL Robertson	3:48
19.	"Hush" (featuring Krazy & Slay Sean)	DJ Ron	3:57
20.	"Roll How We Roll" (featuring Afficial)	Donald XL Robertson	2:52
21.	"Would You" (featuring Suga Bear & Krazy)	Suga Bear	3:11
22.	"It Don't Get No Better" (featuring Black Felon)	Donald XL Robertson	2:42
23.	"Always Come Back to You"	Ezell Swang	3:45

Notes

- Track 4 is incorrectly listed as "featuring Slay Sean".
- Track 12 is incorrectly listed as "featuring Slay Sean, Krazy, & Short Circuit".

== Charts ==
=== Album ===
Weekly charts

Chart (2000)	Peak position
US Billboard 200	26
US Top R&B/Hip-Hop Albums (Billboard)	2

Year-end charts

Chart (2001)	Position
US Billboard 200	173
US Top R&B/Hip-Hop Albums (Billboard)	54

=== Singles ===
Bout Dat

Chart (2000)	Peak position
US Hot R&B/Hip-Hop Songs (Billboard)	46

Souljas

Chart (2000)	Peak position
US Billboard Hot 100	98
US Hot R&B/Hip-Hop Songs (Billboard)	35
US Hot Rap Songs (Billboard)	1

== Certifications ==
Region	Certification	Certified units/sales
United States (RIAA)	Gold	500,000^{^}
^{^} Shipments figures based on certification alone.
