= Only God Can Judge Me =

Studio album by Master P
- Released: October 26, 1999
- Recorded: 1998–1999
- Genres: Gangsta rap; R&B; Southern rap
- Length: 70:28
- Labels: No Limit; Priority; EMI
- Producers: Master P (also exec.); Carlos Stephens, Rico Lumpkins, Charles & Dez, Donald XL Robertson, Ke'Noe, Suga Bear, Pennatentirie, Carl So-Lowe, Jermaine Dupri

Master P chronology
MP da Last Don (1998)	Only God Can Judge Me (1999)	Ghetto Postage (2000)

Singles from Only God Can Judge Me
- 1. "Step to Dis" Released: 1999; 2. "Da Ballers" Released: 2000

Professional ratings
Review scores
Source	Rating
AllMusic	2/5 stars
Entertainment Weekly	B
Rolling Stone	3.5/5 stars
The Source	3.5/5 stars
USA Today	3/4 stars

Only God Can Judge Me is the eighth studio album by American hip hop recording artist Master P, released on October 26, 1999, by No Limit Records, Priority Records and EMI. It was produced by Carlos Stephens, XL, Ke'Noe, Sons Of Funk, Jermaine Dupri, and features several guest contributions from fellow American rappers such as Nas, Jermaine Dupri, Mystikal, Mac, Silkk the Shocker and Magic.

== Background ==
It marked Master P's return to rap as a solo artist after the chart-topping "MP Da Last Don" in 1998. Videos were released for the two singles "Step to Dis" and "Da Ballers".

== Commercial performance ==
Only God Can Judge Me sold 153,000 copies in its first week. It has been certified Gold by the RIAA for shipments of 500,000 units.

== Track listing ==
No.	Title	Length
1.	"Only God Can Judge Me"	2:56
2.	"Ghetto Prayer" (featuring Magic & Suga Bear)	3:02
3.	"Step to Dis" (featuring D.I.G.)	2:51
4.	"Return of da Don" (featuring Silkk The Shocker)	2:46
5.	"Say Brah" (featuring Mac)	3:07
6.	"Boonapalist" (featuring Ms. Peaches & D.I.G.)	3:38
7.	"Where Do We Go from Here" (featuring Mac, Nas & Sons of Funk)	4:19
8.	"Ice on My Wrist (Remix)" (featuring Magic)	3:22
9.	"Stop Playing wit Me"	4:06
10.	"Ghetto in the Sky" (featuring Suga Bear)	3:46
11.	"Ain't Nothing Changed" (featuring D.I.G. & Magic)	3:19
12.	"Commercial" (featuring Reginelli and Melchoir as Young Gunz)	2:23
13.	"Oh Na Nae"	2:40
14.	"Ghetto Honeys" (featuring Mac)	2:55
15.	"Y'all Don't Want None" (featuring Mystikal)	3:19
16.	"Life Ain't Easy" (featuring C-Murder & Porsha)	1:52
17.	"Who Down to Ride" (featuring D.I.G.)	2:26
18.	"Y'all Don't Know" (featuring Ghetto Commission & Two For One)	3:53
19.	"Nobody Moves" (featuring Magic & Silkk The Shocker)	3:11
20.	"Da Ballers" (featuring Jermaine Dupri)	3:02
21.	"Crazy Bout Ya" (featuring Mercedes & Ms. Peaches)	2:45
22.	"(Intro to) Get Yo Mind Right"	0:20
23.	"Get Yo Mind Right" (featuring C-Murder)	3:30

Samples

Ghetto Prayer interpolates Aaliyah's "If Your Girl Only Knew".

== Personnel ==
- Aswad - Composer
- C-Murder - Primary Artist
- Jodi Cohen - Design, Layout Design
- De'Mond - Guest Artist, Performer, Primary Artist
- Jermaine Dupri - Guest Artist, Producer
- Ghetto Commission - Performer, Primary Artist
- Ke'Noe - Producer
- Ricco Lumpkins - Engineer, Producer
- M.A.C. - Guest Artist, Primary Artist
- Magic - Guest Artist, Primary Artist
- Master P- Executive Producer, Performer
- Mercedes - Primary Artist
- Ms. Peaches - Primary Artist
- Mystikal - Primary Artist
- Nas - Guest Artist
- Porsha - Primary Artist
- Rappin' 4-Tay - Vocals
- Donald "XL" Robertson Producer
- Silkk the Shocker - Guest Artist, Primary artist
- Sons of Funk - Vocals
- Carlos Stephens - Arranger, Mixing, Producer
- Suga Bear - Producer, Vocals

== Charts ==
=== Weekly charts ===
Chart (1999)	Peak position
US Billboard 200	2
US Top R&B/Hip-Hop Albums (Billboard)	1

=== Year-end charts ===
Chart (1999)	Position
US Top R&B/Hip-Hop Albums (Billboard)	76

=== Singles ===
Step to Dis

Chart	Position
U.S. Billboard Hot 100	98
U.S. Hot R&B/Hip-Hop Singles & Tracks	21
U.S. Hot Rap Singles	10

== Certifications ==
Region	Certification	Certified units/sales
United States (RIAA)	Gold	500,000^{^}
^{^} Shipments figures based on certification alone.

== See also ==
- List of Billboard number-one R&B albums of 1999
