= Ghetto Commission =

American hip hop group

- Origin: New Orleans, Louisiana
- Genres: Hip hop
- Years active: 1998–2001
- Labels: No Limit Records/ Priority Records, Flame Entertainment/ House of Noise
- Members: Holloway (Dwayne Lawrence); G-Spade (Gary Arnold); Valerio (Walter Valerio); Dolliole (Byron Dolliole)

The Ghetto Commission was a rap quartet signed to No Limit Records.

== Biography ==
The Ghetto Commission was formed in 1998 in New Orleans, Louisiana, U.S. Members consisted of New Orleans rappers Holloway (Dwayne Lawrence), G-Spade (Gary Arnold), Valerio (Walter Valerio) and singer Byron Dolliole. The group made several guest appearances on No Limit releases from 1998 to 2000. They released their first and only album, Wise Guys, in 1998, which featured the non-charting single "I'm a Soulja". The album peaked at number 59 on the Billboard 200 and number 12 on the Top R&B/Hip-Hop Albums.

Ghetto Commission's last appearance for No Limit was on the 2000 single "We Bust" by 504 Boyz.

== Discography ==
List of albums, with selected chart positions
Title	Album details	Peak chart positions	
Title	Album details	US	US R&B
Wise Guys	Released: November 10, 1998; Label: No Limit Records / Priority Records	59	12

== Singles ==
=== As lead artist ===
List of singles as featured artist, with selected chart positions and certifications, showing year released and album name
Title	Year	Peak chart positions			Album
Title	Year	US	US R&B	US Rap	Album
"I'm a Soulja" (featuring Master P and Mystikal)	1998	—	—	—	Wise Guys
