= Ghetto Bill =

Ghetto Bill: The Best Hustler in the Game

Studio album by Master P
- Released: June 21, 2005
- Recorded: 2004–2005
- Genre: Hip-hop
- Length: 1:10:30
- Labels: The New No Limit; Koch
- Producers: Drumma Boy; Master P; Myke Diesel

Master P chronology
Good Side, Bad Side (2004)	Ghetto Bill: The Best Hustler in the Game (2005)	Living Legend: Certified D-Boy (2005)

Singles from Ghetto Bill
- 1. "I Need Dubs" Released: January 13, 2005

Professional ratings
Review scores
Source	Rating
AllMusic	3/5 stars
RapReviews	6/10

Ghetto Bill: The Best Hustler in the Game is the twelfth solo studio album by American rapper Master P. It was released on June 21, 2005, by The New No Limit Records, making his second and final full-length disturbed via Koch Records. Production was handled by Drumma Boy, Myke Diesel, and Master P himself, who also served as executive producer. It features guest appearances from Lil' Romeo, Slim Thug, Young Buck, Silkk the Shocker, Black Don, C-Los, D The Business, Pop, Ruga, Tank Dog, Halleluyah, Ashleey, Dino West and Drumma Boy. The album peaked at number 39 on the Billboard 200, number 12 on the Top R&B/Hip-Hop Albums, number 7 on the Top Rap Albums and number one on the Independent Albums charts in the United States. The album spawned four promotional singles "Yappin'", "I Need Dubs", "Get The Party Crackin'" and "Thug Chick" b/w "Shake What Ya Got".

== Track listing ==
No.	Title	Producer(s)	Length
1.	"Best Hustler"	Myke Diesel	5:02
2.	"I Ain't Play'n"	Drumma Boy	3:06
3.	"Let Me See It" (featuring C-Los, Pop, Black Don, Lil' D, Tank Dog and Ruga)	Drumma Boy	4:18
4.	"Shut It Down" (featuring Slim Thug)	Drumma Boy	2:50
5.	"Feel Me" (featuring Pop)	Drumma Boy	2:41
6.	"I Need Dubs" (featuring Lil' Romeo)	Master P; Myke Diesel	4:01
7.	"I'm Alright"	Drumma Boy	2:46
8.	"Shake What Ya Got" (featuring C-Los, Black Don, Tank Dog and Pop)	Myke Diesel	3:49
9.	"Love Hate" (featuring Halleluyah)	Drumma Boy	3:05
10.	"My Dogs"	Drumma Boy	2:23
11.	"Whole Hood"	Drumma Boy	3:09
12.	"I'm a Gangsta" (featuring Pop, Dino West, Halleluyah and Ruga)	Drumma Boy	3:09
13.	"Yappin'" (featuring Young Buck)	Drumma Boy	4:29
14.	"It's All Good" (featuring Ashleey)	Myke Diesel	3:51
15.	"Get the Party Crackin" (featuring Silkk the Shocker, Halleluyah and Ruga)	Drumma Boy	4:37
16.	"Respect My Game"	Drumma Boy	3:10
17.	"Hood Starr" (featuring Lil' D, C-Los, Tank Dog and Black Don)	Drumma Boy	4:01
18.	"Thug Chick" (featuring Halleluyah)	Drumma Boy	3:13
19.	"Dope Mann"	Drumma Boy	3:33
20.	"There They Go" (featuring Drumma Boy)	Drumma Boy	3:17
Total length:			1:10:30

== Charts ==
Chart (2005)	Peak position
US Billboard 200	39
US Top R&B/Hip-Hop Albums (Billboard)	12
US Top Rap Albums (Billboard)	7
US Independent Albums (Billboard)	1
