= The Gift (Master P album) =

Studio album by Master P
- Released: December 6, 2013
- Recorded: 2012–13
- Genre: Hip-hop
- Length: 60:02
- Labels: No Limit Forever; XLP
- Producers: 1500 or Nothin' (exec.); BK Productions (also exec.); Jaymison Beverly; J-Buc; Team Green

Master P chronology
Hip Hop History (2007)	The Gift (2013)	Empire, from the Hood to Hollywood (2015)

Singles from The Gift
- 1. "Woke Up a Millionaire" Released: June 13, 2013; 2. "I Need an Armored Truck" Released: August 13, 2013; 3. "I Ain't Gonna Let It Happen Twice" Released: September 19, 2013; 4. "You Need To Know" Released: September 24, 2013; 5. "Lonely Road" Released: November 5, 2013; 6. "Two Three" Released: November 20, 2013

The Gift is the fourteenth studio album by American rapper Master P. The album was released on December 6, 2013, by No Limit Forever and XLP Distribution. It became his first release in 8 years. The album features guest appearances from Romeo, Cymphonique, Nipsey Hussle, Yo Gotti, The Game, Rick Ross, Jeremih, Alley Boy, Silkk the Shocker, Howie T, AD, Krazy, Deezle, Play Beezy, Gangsta, Miss Chee, Larayne and T-Bo. The album was supported with the official singles "Two Three" and "Lonely Road".

== Background ==
In October 2013, during an interview with AllHipHop, Master P stated that each copy of The Gift would come with a “golden lottery ticket", which would put the purchaser in a raffle for $10,000, saying:

"As I get better with time, the man upstairs has blessed me and continues to give me the inspiration to share my talents or should I say my GIFT with my current and new fan base of music consumers of all ages and ethnic backgrounds across the world. With the holidays approaching and the economy being the way it is, many families will be unable to buy gifts for their loved ones and that’s why I want to give everyone THE GIFT. Most importantly, I will be able to use my gift of music to help give back to underprivileged kids in many communities, and give them a chance to receive Christmas gifts that they would normally not be able to afford. It is my hope that this will encourage other artists to join me in this movement."

== Singles ==
On November 20, 2013, the album's first single "Two Three" featuring Rick Ross was released.

== Track listing ==
The Gift – Standard version
No.	Title	Writer(s)	Producer(s)	Length
1.	"Spotlight" (featuring Howie T)	Percy Miller		3:56
2.	"Lonely Road" (featuring Howie T & AD)	Percy Miller; Howie T; Aaron Davis		3:30
3.	"It's a Jungle Out Here" (featuring Howie T)	Percy Miller; Howie T		3:25
4.	"You a Genius" (featuring Alley Boy)	Percy Miller; Alley Boy		3:42
5.	"Two Three" (featuring Rick Ross)	Percy Miller; William Roberts II	Team Green	3:08
6.	"Change Ya Life" (featuring Silkk the Shocker & Howie T)	Percy Miller; Vyshonne Miller	1500 or Nothin'	3:00
7.	"Holding Back the Years" (featuring Cymphonique)		Jaymison Beverly	2:44
8.	"Ghost" (featuring Romeo)	Percy Miller; Romeo Miller		2:50
9.	"You're the One" (featuring Jeremih)			4:35
10.	"White" (featuring Yo Gotti & Krazy)	Percy Miller; Mario Mims; Krazy	J-Buc	3:40
11.	"Woke Up a Millionaire" (featuring Deezle)	Percy Miller		4:03
12.	"Let Me Find Out" (featuring Play Beezy & Gangsta)	Percy Miller; Play Beezy; Gangsta	Jaymison Beverly	2:54
13.	"You Ain't Gotta Say Too Much" (featuring Miss Chee, Howie T & Larayne)	Percy Miller; Miss Chee; Howie T		2:55
14.	"Make It Do What It Do" (featuring T-Bo)	Percy Miller; T-Bo		3:09
15.	"I Ain't Goin Let It Happen Twice" (featuring Gangsta & Play Beezy)			5:00
16.	"You Need to Know"		Jaymison Beverly	3:25
17.	"I Need an Armored Truck" (featuring Romeo)	Percy Miller; Romeo Miller		2:57
18.	"God Forgive Us" (featuring The Game & Nipsey Hussle)		1500 or Nothin'	3:49

Samples

- "Holding Back the Years" contains a sample of "Holding Back the Years" performed by Simply Red
