= Hip Hop History =

Studio album by Miller Boyz
- Released: September 4, 2007
- Recorded: 2006–2007
- Genre: Southern hip-hop
- Labels: Take A Stand; UrbanDigital; GoDigital
- Producers: Master P, Romeo

Master P chronology
Living Legend: Certified D-Boy (2005)	Hip Hop History (2007)	The Gift (2013)

Romeo chronology
Lottery (2006)	Hip Hop History (2007)	Spring Break (2010)

Hip Hop History is a collaboration album by Master P and his son Romeo Miller, performing as the Miller Boyz. It includes guest performances by Tank, Marques Houston, Lil Boosie, Playa, Bblak, Mizz Kitty and Young V.

== Conception and promotion ==
In June 2007, Master P and Romeo announced plans to create a joint album without profanity while still containing "street music" themes.

Initially, the idea of this album was met with derision, with 50 Cent criticizing Master P as irrelevant. However, in September 2007, Master P was a surprise guest on an episode of the BET music show 106 & Park that had 50 Cent as guest host. The two rappers discussed Hip Hop History cordially.

== Track listing ==
1. "My Life" (feat. Mizz Kitty & Playa) (Prod by I.N.F.O.) 5:07
2. "Love My Mama" (feat. Tank) 3:21
3. "I Hope She Likes Me" 2:38
4. "Rainman" (Prod. by Reco Lynch) 2:59
5. "Rock It" (feat. Mizz Kitty) 3:08
6. "I Like That" 3:03
7. "Outchere" (feat. Mizz Kitty & Playa) (Prod by Raphael RJ2) 3:54
8. "Stay Ready" (feat. Mizz Kitty & Blakk) 4:09
9. "Side Kick" (feat. Playa) 4:05
10. "I Got That Work" 2:47
11. "Money Don't Make Me" (feat. Blakk) 4:39
12. "Let the Kids Grow" 3:54
13. "Be Like You" (feat. Forrest Lipton) 3:31
14. "Special Girl (Remix)" (feat. Marques Houston) 4:50
15. "Im So Fly" (feat. Young V) 3:48
16. "Ballin" 3:12
17. "Country" (feat. Lil' Boosie & Bengie) 4:34
18. "Can't Please Em All" 5:38
19. "Black History" 3:27

== Reception ==
Pedro "DJ Complejo" Hernandez rated the album five out of 10 points for RapReviews, calling it "simply the same tired rap with the same negativity minus curse words" as Master P's earlier albums.
