= Game Face =

Studio album by Master P
- Released: December 18, 2001
- Recorded: 2000–2001
- Genre: Hip hop
- Length: 48:56
- Labels: The New No Limit; Universal
- Producers: Carlos Stephens; Ezell Swang; Full Pack Music; Master P (exec.); Donald XL Robertson (exec.); S Bear; Presidential Campaign; Myke Diesel

Master P chronology
Ghetto Postage (2000)	Game Face (2001)	Good Side, Bad Side (2004)

Singles from Game Face
- 1. "Ooohhhwee" Released: 2001; 2. "Rock it" Released: 2001; 3. "Real Love" Released: 2002

Game Face is the tenth studio album by American rapper Master P, released on December 18, 2001. It marked the debut of The New No Limit Records and a partnership with Universal Records. There are three singles released from the album, "Ooohhhwee", "Real Love", and "Rock it", Music videos were released for all three. The album received a mixed reception from critics who saw some change in Master P's production choices from his producers and lyrical delivery but felt that it wasn't anything new from the genre.

== Reception ==
=== Critical reception ===
Professional ratings
Aggregate scores
Source	Rating
Metacritic	40/100
Review scores
Source	Rating
AllMusic	3/5 stars
Entertainment Weekly	B−
HipHopDX	2.5/5 stars
The Source	3.5/5 stars
Vibe	3/5 stars
XXL	M (2/5)

Game Face garnered mixed reviews from music critics who saw some change in lyrical content and production but felt that it didn't deliver anything new to the genre. At Metacritic, which assigns a normalized rating out of 100 to reviews from mainstream critics, the album received an average score of 40, based on 4 reviews.

Shawn Edwards of Vibe praised Master P for using simplistic wordplay and different production on his songs to feel more accessible saying, "While P's rhyme schemes haven't changed much, he has improved his musical backdrops significantly." Tom Sinclair of Entertainment Weekly found most of the album to be pleasant concluding with, "there's something oddly comforting about the inexorability of it all." AllMusic editor Jason Birchmeier complimented Master P for changing his Southern sound into a more pop rap direction with the samples he used for his songs saying, "Game Face isn't any more impressive than any of his past few albums since Ghetto D. However, it is a much more accessible album because of the pop approach." Wise Q of HipHopDX found tracks like "The Farm," "Lose It and Get It Back" and "Back on Top" as stand outs from the album but felt that it didn't deliver anything new to the genre saying "Most reviews have substance but, like this CD, hip hop will be left feeling empty." The A.V. Club's Nathan Rabin wrote, "A mercifully brief running time (less than 50 minutes) and a few scattered moments of autobiographical storytelling help make Gameface marginally less disposable than its most recent predecessors." Carlton Wade, in a review for XXL, also compared Game Face to Master P's previous projects, saying that it doesn't reach their level. "P's pitiful verses mixed with too many cheesy interpolations [...] make the album's overall value plummet", concluded the journalist.

=== Commercial performance ===
The album debuted at number seventy-two on the Billboard 200 and sold 95,000 copies in its first week of sales. It later climbed up the charts and peaked at number fifty-three in early 2002.

== Music videos ==
There was a music video for the single entitled "Real Love" featuring Sera-Lynn. There was also a music video for the single "Ooohhhwee" featuring actresses LisaRaye McCoy and Angell Conwell.

== Track listing ==
No.	Title	Length
1.	"Take It Outside"	2:20
2.	"Ghetto Ballin'" (featuring Lil' Romeo and Silkk The Shocker)	3:42
3.	"Ooohhhwee" (featuring Weebie)	4:13
4.	"Real Love" (featuring Sera-Lynn)	3:39
5.	"We Want Dough"	3:25
6.	"The Block"	2:55
7.	"A Woman"	2:40
8.	"Back on Top" (featuring Silkk The Shocker, Lil' Romeo and C-Murder)	3:50
9.	"The Farm"	3:16
10.	"What I'm Bout"	3:13
11.	"Whoadie Gone"	4:07
12.	"I Don't"	2:48
13.	"Rock It" (featuring Weebie and Krazy)	3:51
14.	"Lose It and Get It Back"	4:23

== Charts ==
=== Album ===
Weekly charts

Chart (2001)	Peak position
German Albums (Offizielle Top 100)	32
US Billboard 200	53
US Top R&B/Hip-Hop Albums (Billboard)	12

Year-end charts

Chart (2002)	Position
US Top R&B/Hip-Hop Albums (Billboard)	54

=== Singles ===
Ooohhhwee

Chart (2001–2002)	Peak position
US Billboard Hot 100	52
US Hot R&B/Hip-Hop Songs (Billboard)	19
US Rhythmic Airplay (Billboard)	34

Rock It

Chart (2002)	Peak position
US R&B/Hip-Hop Airplay (Billboard)	70
US Hot R&B/Hip-Hop Songs (Billboard)	72
