= Living Legend: Certified D-Boy =

Studio album by Master P
- Released: November 29, 2005
- Recorded: 2005
- Genre: Gangsta rap, Southern hip-hop
- Label: Guttar Music
- Producer: Master P (exec.)

Master P chronology
Ghetto Bill (2005)	Living Legend: Certified D-Boy (2005)	Hip Hop History (2007)

Singles from Living Legend: Certified D-Boy
- 1. "Cookie Money" Released: 2005

Professional ratings
Review scores
Source	Rating
AllMusic	2.5/5 stars

Living Legend: Certified D-Boy is the thirteenth studio album by Master P under his new imprint, Guttar Music. It was released on November 29, 2005, and marked Master P's return to his "Ice Cream Man" persona. Although he released the album Ghetto Bill earlier that year, he released this album to raise relief funds for the victims of Hurricane Katrina. It has sold over 75,000 copies according to SoundScan and includes the single "Cookie Money", featuring P's cousin and fellow New No Limit/Guttar Music rapper Black.

== Track listing ==
No.	Title	Length
1.	"Shut Your Trap" (featuring Krazy and Black)	4:04
2.	"Cookie Money" (featuring Black)	3:10
3.	"Score Money" (featuring 504 Boyz)	3:47
4.	"I Can't Imagine" (featuring Rowdy, Halleluyah, and Black)	4:12
5.	"Sequal"	2:58
6.	"Throw Em Up" (featuring Black and Michael Blackston)	5:01
7.	"Couple Grand" (featuring 504 Boyz)	5:14
8.	"We Don't Rock" (featuring 504 Boyz)	3:34
9.	"F**k Boyz" (featuring 504 Boyz)	4:03
10.	"Keep It Gansta" (featuring Halleluyah)	3:08
11.	"Ridin Dirty" (featuring Rowdy and Playa)	4:03
12.	"Division" (featuring Black)	4:05

== Charts ==
Chart	Peak position
US Top R&B/Hip-Hop Albums	98
