= Master P =

American rapper (born 1970)

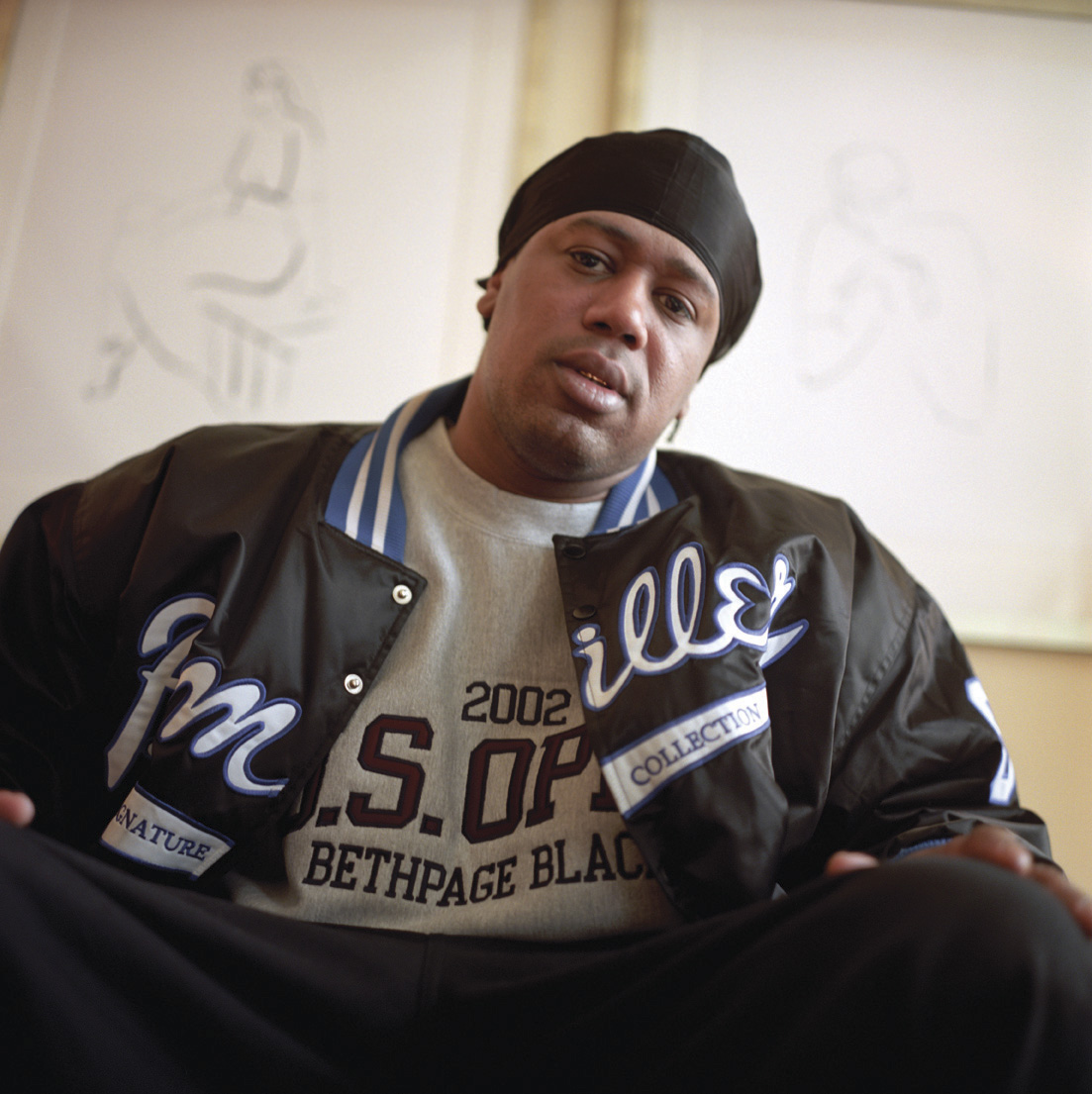
- Master P in 2002
- Born: Percy Robert Miller; April 29, 1970 (age 56); New Orleans, Louisiana, U.S.
- Other names: The Colonel; Nino Brown; The Ice Cream Man; The Ghetto Bill; MP
- Education: Merritt College (BS)
- Occupations: Rapper; songwriter; dancer; record producer; record executive; entrepreneur; actor; professional basketball player
- Years active: 1989–present
- Spouse: Sonya C. Miller (m. 1989; div. 2022)
- Children: 9, including Romeo and Cymphonique
- Relatives: C-Murder (brother); Silkk the Shocker (brother); Mo B. Dick (cousin); D The Business (cousin)
- Awards: Full list
- Musical career
- Genre: Hip-hop
- Instruments: Vocals
- Labels: No Limit Forever; In a Minute; Priority; EMI; The New No Limit; Universal; E1; No Limit
- Formerly of: 504 Boyz; TRU

Percy Robert Miller (born April 29, 1970), better known by his stage name Master P, is an American rapper, actor, record executive, record producer and entrepreneur. He founded No Limit Records in 1991, which was relaunched into the spin-off labels New No Limit Records and No Limit Forever Records. Miller gained fame in the mid-1990s as a member of the label's hip hop groups TRU and 504 Boyz as well as his fifth solo album, Ice Cream Man (1996), and its namesake lead single. His 1997 single, "Make 'Em Say Uhh!" received platinum certification by the Recording Industry Association of America (RIAA). Miller has released 15 studio albums throughout his career.

== Early life ==
Percy Robert Miller was born and raised in the Third Ward of Uptown New Orleans, Louisiana. He grew up in the Calliope Projects. He is the second oldest of five children. He has one sister, Germaine, and three brothers: Kevin, and platinum-selling rap artists Corey "C-Murder" and Vyshonne "Silkk the Shocker" Miller. He attended St. Augustine High School (New Orleans) Booker T. Washington High School and Warren Easton High School.

Having played on the basketball team, Miller attended the University of Houston on an athletic scholarship, but dropped out months into his freshman year and transferred to Merritt College in Oakland, California, to major in business administration. He mentioned that he worked at two jobs in his lifetime, with Bellsouth Mobility and Remco.

After the death of his grandfather, Miller inherited $10,000 as part of a malpractice settlement. Miller opened a record store in Richmond, California, called No Limit Records And Tapes, which later became the foundation for No Limit Records. On February 15, 1990, Master P released the cassette tape Mind Of A Psychopath. His brother Kevin Miller was killed that same year in New Orleans. This increased his motivation to become a successful entrepreneur to change his life and save his family.

== Music career ==
=== 1989–1995: Early works ===
Master P released his debut studio album Get Away Clean on February 12, 1991. In April 1992 he released his second album, Mama's Bad Boy. Both albums were released through In-A-Minute Records. Also in 1992, he released his first collaboration album with his group TRU titled Understanding the Criminal Mind. In 1993, they released another album titled Who's da Killer?.

In March 1994, Master P released his third studio album The Ghettos Tryin to Kill Me!. It was re-released in 1997 as a limited edition under Priority. That same year Master P collaborated on the No Limit compilation albums West Coast Bad Boyz, Vol. 1: Anotha Level of the Game and West Coast Bad Boyz: High fo Xmas. On June 6, 1995, Master P released his fourth studio album 99 Ways to Die.

Master P and TRU released their third album True in 1995, which was the group's first major release after two independent albums. The album reached number 25 on the Top R&B/Hip-Hop Albums and number 14 on the Top Heatseekers. The album was known for its first single and one of Master P's best known songs "I'm Bout' It, Bout It". He also worked on the compilation album, Down South Hustlers: Bouncin' and Swingin', during that year.

Master P said that when he used to open for Tupac Shakur in the early 1990s, the people responsible for introducing him would frequently call him "Mr. P the country singer".

=== 1995–2000: Return to New Orleans and mainstream success ===
In 1995, Master P moved from California back to New Orleans to relocate No Limit Records with a set of new artists and in-house producers Beats By the Pound. On April 16, 1996, Master P released his fifth album Ice Cream Man. It contained the hit single "Mr. Ice Cream Man". Later in 1996, Master P returned with TRU to work on Tru 2 da Game, which would not be released until February 18, 1997. At that time, TRU was reduced to a trio with just Master P alongside his brothers C-Murder and Silkk the Shocker.

On September 2, 1997, Master P released his breakthrough album Ghetto D. The first week sales of the album were the highest of any of Master P's albums, selling more than 760,000 copies, and it went on to go certified triple platinum. It contained the hit single "Make 'Em Say Uhh!", Master P's highest-charting single to date. The song earned him an MTV Video Music Award nomination the following year for "Best Rap Video", but lost to Will Smith's "Gettin' Jiggy Wit It".

On June 2, 1998, Master P released his seventh and best-selling album to date MP Da Last Don. Master P released a film of the same name earlier that year. The album debuted at number 1 on the Billboard Top 200 charts, selling more than 400,000 copies in its first week, and sold in excess of four million copies. On October 26, 1999, Master P released his eighth studio album Only God Can Judge Me, which contained his single "Step To Dis". The album went certified gold, selling more than 500,000 copies.

In 1999, Master P and TRU released their fifth studio album Da Crime Family. On November 28, 2000, he released his ninth studio album Ghetto Postage, which contained his hit singles "Bout Dat" and "Souljas". Also in 2000, Master P and his new group 504 Boyz released their debut album Goodfellas, which peaked at number 1 on the Top R&B/Hip-Hop Albums and contained their hit single "Wobble Wobble".

=== 2001–2005: The New No Limit ===
On December 18, 2001, Master P released his tenth studio album, Game Face, the first Master P album released on The New No Limit, which had a partnership with Universal Records. In 2002, The 504 Boyz released their second album Ballers. Both albums charted high on the Hip-Hop charts, but shortly after, No Limit began to decline in popularity. Record sales as well as roster changes and lawsuits caused No Limit Records to file for bankruptcy on December 17, 2003.

Master P's eleventh album, titled Good Side, Bad Side, was released on March 23, 2004, through Koch Records, debuting at number 1 on the Billboard Independent Albums chart. Master P and TRU released their last album The Truth in 2005 followed by Master P's twelfth studio album Ghetto Bill:The Best Hustler in the Game.

=== 2005–2007: Guttar Music ===
In 2005, Master P and his son Romeo Miller formed the independent label Guttar Music. On November 29, 2005, Master P released his first independent album and 13th overall, Living Legend: Certified D-Boy, on Guttar Music. Master P and 504 Boyz released their last album titled Hurricane Katrina: We Gon Bounce Back that year, and it was dedicated to the victims of Hurricane Katrina.

In April 2006, Master P released a compilation album America's Most Luved Bad Guy. In 2007, Master P released a collaboration album with Romeo titled Hip Hop History that sold 32,000 copies worldwide.

=== Since 2010: No Limit Forever and recent works ===
On December 6, 2010, it was announced that Master P was going on a new tour with his brother Silkk The Shocker and his son Romeo titled No Limit Forever International. On February 8, 2011, Master P was featured on rapper Gucci Mane's track titled "Brinks". It was his first recorded song in more than four years. In early 2012, Master P started to re brand his label. On August 10, 2012, he performed at Insane Clown Posse's 12th Annual "Gathering of the Juggalos" concert. On November 16, 2011, Master P released his first mixtape and first solo project in more than six years, titled TMZ (Too Many Zeros). On August 2, 2012, it was announced that Master P was working on his thirteenth studio album Boss of All Bosses. On September 17, 2012, Master P released snippet of an upcoming single titled "Friends With Benefits", featuring rapper/singer Kirko Bangz.

On January 16, 2013, Master P released his second official mixtape titled Al Capone as a promotion for his Boss of All Bosses album. On February 12, 2013, Master P released his first collaboration mixtape titled New World Order with his new group, Louie V. Mob, which includes himself and rappers Alley Boy and Fat Trel. On August 6, 2013, Master P released his third official mixtape titled Famous Again as a promotion for his Boss of All Bosses album, featuring appearances from Rome, Silkk The Shocker, Dee-1, Young Louie, Play Beezy, Gangsta, Howie T, Clyde Carson, Game, Chief Keef, Fat Trel, Alley Boy, Problem, Wiz Khalifa, Tyga, and Chris Brown, and production from 1500 & Nothin, Young Bugatti, Stiv Schneider, The Composer, and JB. On December 6, 2013, Master P released his fifth album titled The Gift.

The Gift was re-released on February 21, 2014, as a video album with a music video for every song, and titled The Platinum Gift. On February 6, 2014, it was announced that Master P was working on two new albums, Ice Cream Man 2, which is a sequel to Ice Cream Man, and Boss of All Bosses. On February 28, 2014, Miller released his fourth mixtape The Gift Vol. 1: Return of The Ice Cream Man.

On January 5, 2015, Master P released his second collaboration mixtape titled We All We Got with his new group Money Mafia, which includes himself, his son Maserati Rome, Ace B, Young Junne, Eastwood, Gangsta, Play Beezy, Calliope Popeye, Flight Boy, and No Limit Forever in-house producer Blaq N Mild. The mixtape included a surprise feature from rapper Lil Wayne on the track "Power". On February 9, 2015, Master P released his third collaboration mixtape titled #CP3 with his No Limit Forever artist and rapper Ace B.

On April 20, 2015, Master P released his fourth collaboration mixtape titled Hustlin with his group Money Mafia. On June 4, 2015, it was announced that Master P's newest group Money Mafia would be releasing their debut album in 2015 titled Rarri Boys. On June 8, 2015, Master P along with Money Mafia released their first single from Rarri Boys titled "Bonita". On July 16, 2015, Master P released his fifth collaboration mixtape titled The Luciano Family with his group Money Mafia. On October 7, 2015, Master P revealed the cover art and announced that there would be three sequel album installments to his critically acclaimed debut major label album Ice Cream Man titled Ice Cream Man 2: The Streets, Ice Cream Man 3: The Hustle, Ice Cream Man 4: The Lifestyle that will be released all on the same day.

On October 13, 2015, Master P revealed the cover art, release date and track list to his upcoming new album titled Empire, that will be released on November 28, 2015. On November 27, 2015, Master P released his fourteenth album titled Empire, from the Hood to Hollywood, featuring guest appearances from Krazy, Lil Wayne, Maserati Rome, Money Mafia, Ace B, BlaqNmilD, Fame-O and Luccianos, released via his label No Limit Forever Records and Globy House Records.

On February 23, 2016, Master P released a new single titled "Funeral". It featured his new group No Limit Boys members Ace B and Angelo Nano. On March 2, 2016, Master P released a new single titled "Middle Finga". On March 18, 2016, during an interview Master P announced that he was working on a new album titled The Grind Don't Stop with his new group No Limit Boys & a new tour, titled the Pop-Up Tour. On March 28, 2016, it was announced that Master P's newest group No Limit Boys formerly Money Mafia would be releasing their debut album in 2016, titled No Limit Boys.

On August 21, 2016, Master P released his sixth official mixtape titled The G Mixtape, featuring appearances from 2 Chainz, A$AP Ferg, E-40, The Game, Gucci Mane, Jeremih, Lil Wayne, Nipsey Hussle, No Limit Boys, Rick Ross, Usher, Travis Scott and Yo Gotti. On October 27, 2016, Master P released his seventh official mixtape titled Louisiana Hot Sauce, featuring appearances from fellow No Limit Forever artist Ace B, Angelo Nano, Cymphonique, Gangsta, J Slugg, Lambo, Moe Roy, Play Beezy, Romeo and Young Vee.

On January 6, 2017, Master P released his sixth collaboration mixtape, titled We All We Got, with his group No Limit Boys.

==== No Limit Chronicles and retirement ====
On July 29, 2020, Master P released No Limit Chronicles, a five-part BET docuseries on his New Orleans–based hip-hop label. The series shares stories of Master P's career as a record executive and businessman, underscoring the unprecedented distribution deal with Priority Records that made No Limit Records a powerhouse record label in the 1990s. Awareness of the circumstances of Master P's incarcerated brother, C-Murder, resurged after the series aired, prompting Percy to rally for his brother's release. On August 17, 2020, Master P posted a video to his Instagram account of him and C-Murder's lawyer speaking to a group of protesters, inciting momentum to work in favor of his brother's liberation.

In July 2025, he announced that he was retiring from music to become head coach and president of basketball operations for the University of New Orleans basketball team, with his final performance being at the 2025 Essence Festival of Culture.

== Business career ==
Aside from being a rapper, Master P has enjoyed a successful career as an entrepreneur and investor. Miller opened a record store in Richmond, California, called No Limit Records, which later became the foundation for his own record label of the same name.

Miller was one of the first rappers to notice and take advantage of the retail potential of the music industry. As an investor, Master P was one of the first rappers to build a business and financial empire by investing in a wide range of business and investment ventures from a variety of industries. He has since invested the millions of dollars he made from his No Limit record company into a travel agency, a Foot Locker retail outlet, real estate, stocks, film, music, and television production, toy making, clothing, telecommunications, a jewellery line, auto accessories, book and magazine publishing, car rims, fast food franchises, and gas stations.

His sports management agency No Limit Communications, a joint venture with marketing guru Djuan Edgerton, was a success. His conglomerate company, No Limit Enterprises became a financial powerhouse. His real estate investment and property management company, the New Orleans–based PM Properties controls over 100 properties across the United States. According to Black Enterprise magazine, No Limit Enterprises grossed $110 million in revenue in 1998. This level of success inspired other rappers to branch out into other business ventures and investments. Miller has his own line of beverages called "Make 'Em Say Ughh!" energy drinks.

Rappers had historically focused more on the artistic and glamorous side of hip hop music while paying very little attention to the business, investment, and financial aspects. All that changed in 1996 when Master P signed a music distribution deal with Priority Records, one where No Limit Records would retain 100% ownership of their master recordings and keep 85% of their record's sales while giving Priority 15% in return for pressing and distribution, which allows No Limit to profit from future sales such as catalogs and reissues.

Master P went on to make hundreds of millions of dollars from this deal. Master P invented many innovative marketing techniques. According to Wendy Day, CEO of the Rap Coalition: "Master P had a whole marketing movement. He was the first person to market the way a corporate entity like IBM would market to their clientele." Whereas the traditional model for marketing records was to spend millions of dollars on expensive videos and air play, Miller did not have such a luxury. As an independent artist, Miller had to find a way to sell, market and build platinum record selling demand on a limited recording budget.

He was known for keeping upfront business expenses down and profit margins high. He began selling tapes out the trunk of his car in every city and town in America where there was potential demand for his music. He gave out free samples to people with expensive cars and had them playing his music throughout their neighborhoods. This street level guerrilla marketing technique set the foundation to build a larger fanbase for the future. After signing his deal with Priority, Miller began a high-volume business model of cranking out as many records as possible, as frequently as possible. He branded all his albums, so that the No Limit brand became more important than the actual artist's name.

Miller cross-promoted all his artists and albums inside the album covers. He used pen and pixel graphics and Mafia-inspired themes to make his albums stand out using Photoshop. He offered 20 songs per album, whereas most albums offered 15 or less, as Miller learned that customers wanted more for their money. He turned his artists into Marvel comic book-like characters rather than just rappers. He made sure his artists were number one on SoundScan every time they released an album, to build the perception of popularity.

He used inexpensive videos to promote his artists and he cross-promoted albums using films and vice versa and tied them altogether as a package. Brand image and identity became more important than just music quality. Miller's record labels have sold 75 million records as a result of his innovative marketing and branding strategies.

As founder and CEO of No Limit Entertainment, Miller at one time presided over a business empire that included his conglomerate No Limit Enterprises, No Limit Records, Bout It Inc., No Limit Clothing, No Limit Communications, No Limit Films, No Limit Sports Management, P. M. Properties, and Advantage Travel. Miller represented former NFL running back Ricky Williams when he was drafted by the New Orleans Saints; however, the deal was rated the worst contract for a player in NFL History by ESPN.

Miller manages the music, film, and television career of his son, Romeo Miller, and pop star Forrest Lipton and Atlanta rapper Gucci Mane. Miller was the executive television producer for his teenage daughter Cymphonique's Nickelodeon Show, How To Rock, and the co-creator of Romeo!, the hit Nickelodeon television show that stars his son.

== Professional basketball career ==
In 1998, Miller joined the Fort Wayne Fury of the CBA as a backup guard after a No Limit employee asked the Fury head coach to give his boss a tryout. According to the coach Miller was "coachable [and] an eager learner", but not NBA material.

Miller was on the Charlotte Hornets training camp roster for 10 days in January 1999. He was invited to participate at the request of Hornet Ricky Davis's father. He scored 7 points in intrasquad play and played eight minutes in two exhibition games before being released on February 1. Miller claimed he played well but was cut because his rap lyrics were too offensive.

That fall he was on the Toronto Raptors training camp roster. He scored eight points in one preseason game against the Vancouver Grizzlies, but was dropped before the season began. He complained that the Raptors hadn't given him a fair chance.

In November, he signed with the San Diego Stingrays of the short-lived IBL, a "home for players without NBA skills and those who are developing them." His performance was disappointing and he played for less than a season.

In 2004, Miller played for the ABA's Las Vegas Rattlers and Long Beach Jam. He earned try-outs for the Denver Nuggets at training camp for the summer league in 2004 and the same opportunity for the Sacramento Kings in 2005. He took part in the 2008 NBA All-Star Celebrity Game and scored 17 points. He also coached the AAU team the P. Miller Ballers with players such as Brandon Jennings, Lance Stephenson, and DeMar DeRozan who went on to achieve success in the NBA. DeRozan said of his time being coached by Miller: "I am forever grateful for having him in my life. ... He taught us about life, how to understand business—the business of basketball. He was, in a sense, a father figure."

In July 2025, Miller became president of basketball operations for the University of New Orleans basketball team. He left the role in March 2026.

== Other ventures ==
=== Film and television career ===
Since 1997, Master P has been in numerous feature and straight-to-DVD films, as well as television shows. His filmography I Got the Hook Up, Soccer Mom, Gone in 60 Seconds, Hollywood Homicide, Toxic, and Foolish. Master P also starred in the Nickelodeon sitcom Romeo! alongside his son Romeo, which aired from 2003 to 2006. He was also a contestant on Dancing with the Stars, replacing Romeo who dropped out due to an injury. He partnered with Ashly DelGrosso and received a total score of 8 out of 30 for his pasodoble, the lowest score in the show's history. He was eliminated in Week 4.

In 1999, Miller starred alongside Eddie Griffin in the hit film Foolish.

Reported in March 2011, Miller planned to star in a film with Gucci Mane, under the name Get Money. The film, set for release through No Limit, would be based on Miller's book of the same name.

In June 2015, it was announced that Master P and his family would be starring in their own reality show titled Master P's Family Empire. It aired on Reelz in November 2015.

=== Writing ===
Miller intended to publish a book titled Animal Cruelty, which was publicly advertised as forthcoming by June 1998. In January 1999, the book was scrapped.

In September 2007, Miller released his first book, titled Guaranteed Success.

=== Pro wrestling ===
In 1999, he had a small run in World Championship Wrestling (WCW), where he led a professional wrestling stable, the No Limit Soldiers, in a feud with Curt Hennig's the West Texas Rednecks and the Filthy Animals.

In October 2019, Master P purchased a Brooklyn, New York-based independent wrestling promotion, House of Glory.

On April 23, 2025, he made an appearance on AEW Dynamite.

== Legacy ==
Miller is known for his music and his business acumen, due to creating and branding No Limit Records, an independent record label. Its success led to other business ventures under the "No Limit" umbrella.

During a 2013 interview after meeting Miller, Atlanta rapper 2 Chainz stated, "This is my first time meeting [him]. I just want to let him know how he influenced the whole South in Hip-Hop." 2 Chainz went on, "We used to argue people like they ain't understand why we appreciated Master P and his music. It was more than that. I felt like it was his grind, his hustle. He actually put music out like every week. I even heard stories about some of the songs never even being mixed before. It was just about giving the fans what they needed. And he the reason why a lot of us are here, including myself."

== Accolades and honors ==
In 1999, Master P won the award for "Favorite Rap/Hip-Hop Artist" at the American Music Awards.

In 2005, Miller was ranked at number 36 by VH1 in their list of 50 Greatest Hip Hop Artists. On September 29, 2008, Miller's single "Make 'Em Say Uhh!" would be ranked at number 94 by VH1 in their list of 100 Greatest Hip-Hop Songs.

In 2011, BET named Miller number 28 in 'The Most Influential Rappers of All Time'. In 2013, BET listed Miller as one of 'The 25 Influential Black Music Execs'.

In November 2011, Miller's son Romeo Miller performed at the 2010 Hip Hop Honors, along with his brother Valentino Miller, his cousins Lil' D and Black Don, and his uncle Silkk The Shocker, as well as Trina, Gucci Mane, and Mystikal to honor Master P and No Limit Records.

In December 2012, DJ 5150 and DJ Hektik released a tribute mixtape to Master P titled Uptown Veteran.

In July 2013, Miller was inducted into the Louisiana Music Hall of Fame, making him the first hip hop artist to be inducted.

On January 20, 2015, Montreal R&B/Hip Hop artist Xav released a song with Master P called "Bout It Bout It", from his upcoming Zeeky EP, paying homage to Master P's 1995 international hit. The music video, which also features Master P, premiered on Vibe.com the same day.

In May 2021, Master P received his honorary doctorate from Lincoln University in Pennsylvania.

== Philanthropy ==
Miller has dedicated his time to communities through P. Miller Youth Centers and his P. Miller Food Foundation for the Homeless. On July 12, 2005, Willie W. Herenton Jr, the mayor of Memphis, Tennessee, presented Miller with the key to the city. On April 27, 2010, Miller and his son Romeo were awarded the Certificate of Special Recognition from California Congresswoman Maxine Waters. In December 2013, Miller had a benefit concert to raise funds for the children of murder victim Andrea Arnold in Louisville.

== Personal life ==
Miller is Catholic. In 1999, he donated $500,000 to the Catholic elementary school he attended and to two nearby churches.

In 2010, after 21 years of marriage Miller and his wife, Sonya C. Miller separated. Sonya did not file for a divorce until 2013. The former couple have 7 children together, including Romeo Miller and Cymphonique Miller. Miller also has another child by another woman. Sonya and Miller also raised their nephew after Miller's brother was killed in a robbery in 1990.

In 2014, Sonya sued Miller, asking for almost 40% of their assets. Miller has claimed that the two had settled the matter privately in 2016 but it was never submitted to court. In December 2021, he asked the judge to declare him legally single. In May 2022, it was reported that the rapper was legally declared single.

In 2007, he swore off profanity and endorsed Barack Obama for President of the United States of America, contributing frequently to his campaign.

On May 29, 2022, Miller announced that his daughter Tytyana Miller had died at 29 years old.

== Discography ==
Studio albums

- Get Away Clean (1991)
- Mama's Bad Boy (1992)
- The Ghettos Tryin to Kill Me! (1994)
- 99 Ways to Die (1995)
- Ice Cream Man (1996)
- Ghetto D (1997)
- MP da Last Don (1998)
- Only God Can Judge Me (1999)
- Ghetto Postage (2000)
- Game Face (2001)
- Good Side, Bad Side (2004)
- Ghetto Bill:The Best Hustler in the Game (2005)
- Living Legend: Certified D-Boy (2005)
- The Gift (2013)
- Empire, from the Hood to Hollywood (2015)

TRU albums

- Understanding the Criminal Mind (1992)
- Who's da Killer? (1993)
- True (1995)
- Tru 2 da Game (1997)
- Da Crime Family (1999)
- The Truth (2005)

504 Boyz albums

- Goodfellas (2000)
- Ballers (2002)
- Hurricane Katrina: We Gon Bounce Back (2005)

== Filmography ==
=== Film ===
Year	Title	Role	Notes
1997	I'm Bout It	Perry McKnight	Video
1998	The Players Club	Guy	
1998	I Got the Hook Up	Black	
1998	MP da Last Don	Nino	Video
1999	Hot Boyz	'Moe'	Video
1999	Foolish	Quentin 'Fifty Dollah' Waise	
1999	No Tomorrow	Maker	
2000
2000	Track Down	Brad	
2000	Gone in 60 Seconds	Johnnie 'Johnnie B'	
2000	Lockdown	Clean Up	
2000	911	Unknown	Video
2001	Popcorn Shrimp	Crip	Short
2002	Undisputed	Gat Boyz Rapper 1	
2002	Dark Blue	'Maniac'	
2003	Death of a Dynasty	Himself	
2003	Hollywood Homicide	Julius Armas	
2003	Scary Movie 3	Himself	
2003	Bad Bizness	Mr. Carlson	Video
2004	Still Bout It	Perry McKnight	Video
2004	Decisions	Petey	Video
2005	Uncle P	Uncle P	
2006	Repos	'Tee'	Video
2006	God's Gift	Pops	Video
2006	Don't Be Scared	Greg	Video
2007	Paroled	Al 'Big Al'	
2007	Uncle P	Himself	
2007	Black Supaman	Bernard Jr.	Video
2008	Soccer Mom	Wally	
2008	Internet Dating	Trey	Video
2009	The Mail Man	Rob	
2009	The Pig People	Unknown	
2010	Toxic	Angel	
2011	Knock Knock Killer	'Pimp P'	
2017	Killing Hasselhoff	Del Toro	
2017	Destruction: Los Angeles	Jay Jones	
2018	Never Heard	Jason	
2019	I Got the Hook Up 2	Black	
2021	Never and Again	Boss Man	
2021	The Christmas Dance	Brother Moore	
2021	#Unknown	Mayor Leo Rawlings	
2026	Short Track Saturday Night	Rex Allen	

=== Television ===
Year	Title	Role	Notes
1999	Linc's	Himself	Episode: "Lovers and Other Traitors"
1999	WCW Monday Nitro	Himself	Episode: "Episode 4.43"
1999	Malcolm & Eddie	Mister O	Episode: "Badfellas"
2000	Louis Theroux's Weird Weekends	Himself	Episode: "Gangsta Rap"
2000	Moesha	Patience	Recurring cast: season 5
2001	Journeys in Black	Himself	Episode: "Master P"
2001	Making the Video	Himself	Episode: "Snoop Dogg: Lay Low"
2001	E! True Hollywood Story	Himself	
2001	The Hughleys	Himself	Episode: "I'm Dreaming of a Slight Christmas"
2001	Dark Angel	Duvailer	Episode: "Art Attack"
2001	Oz	Curtis Bennett	Episode: "Orpheus Descending"
2002	MADtv	Himself	Episode: "Episode 7.19"
2002	Girlfriends	Himself	Episode: "X Does Not Mark the Spot"
2002–04	Hollywood Squares	Himself	Recurring Guest
2003	Star Search	Himself/Guest Judge	Episode: "The One with the Father and Son Duo Master P and Lil' Romeo"
2003	Doggy Fizzle Televizzle	Himself	Episode: "Episode 1.5"
2003–06	Romeo!	Percy Miller	Main cast
2004	Soul Train	Himself	Episode: "Master P/Freddie Jackson"
2004	CSI: NY	Kevin Vick	Episode: "Grand Master"
2006	Dancing with the Stars	Contestant	Contestant: Season 2
2006	The Fabulous Life Presents: Really Rich Real Estate	Himself	Episode: "Episode 1.3"
2008	The Greatest	Himself	Episode: "100 Greatest Hip Hop Songs"
2009	Robot Chicken	Nick's Friend (voice)	Episode: "President Evil"
2015	Oprah: Where Are They Now?	Himself	Episode: "Hip Hop Mogul Master P/Oprah's Hairstylist/Amy Grant/Legendary Coach Mike Ditka/J.R. Martinez"
2015	Highly Questionable	Himself	Episode: "Master P"
2015–16	Master P's Family Empire	Himself	Main cast
2016	Minay TV	Himself	Episode: "3rd Annual Compton Thanksgiving Dinner"
2016–20	Growing Up Hip Hop	Himself	Supporting cast: season 1–5
2017	Hip Hop Squares	Himself/Contestant	Episode: "Master P vs Romeo"
2017	Soundtracks: Songs That Defined History	Himself	Episode: "Hurricane Katrina"
2020	Celebrity Watch Party	Himself	Recurring Guest
2020	No Limit Chronicles	Himself	Episode: "Nightmares & Dreams" & "Rise of the Tank"
2021	Master P Reviews	Himself	Main cast
2022	Uncensored	Himself	Episode: "Master P"
2023	Soul of a Nation	Himself	Episode: "Hip-Hop @ 50: Rhythms, Rhymes & Reflections - A Soul of a Nation Presentation"

=== Documentaries ===
Year	Title	Role	Notes
1995	Eyes on Hip Hop	Himself	
1997	Rhyme & Reason	Himself	
2001	Xzibit: Restless Xposed	Himself	
2001	Welcome to Death Row	Himself	
2003	Paper Chasers	Himself	
2006	Life After Death Row	Himself	
2008	The Life and Times of Mr. Perfect	Himself	
2008	Desert Bayou	Himself	
2010	Run Ricky Run	Himself	
2022	From the Hood to Hollywood	Himself	

=== Video games ===
Year	Title	Voice role	Notes
2002	Street Hoops	Himself	Vocals
2018	Get Money	Himself	Voice role

== See also ==
- Universal Music Group
- GoDigital Media Group
