= Lil Ric =

American rapper

- Origin: Richmond, California, U.S.
- Genres: Hip hop, West Coast hip hop
- Occupation: Rapper
- Years active: 1994–present
- Labels: Ae'on Music Group, Rapbay, Urbanlife, RED (Current), No Limit, Priority, A.W.O.L., Solo Records, Noo Trybe, Virgin, Concrete (Former)

Ritchie Fontaine, also known as Lil Ric, is an American rapper from Richmond, California, United States, formerly of No Limit and Noo Trybe Records. Lil Ric has worked with numerous other Californian rappers including Laroo, JT the Bigga Figga, Keak da Sneak, San Quinn and The Jacka.

== Music career ==
On October 11, 1994, Lil Ric would release his debut album titled Deep n tha Game, it would be one of No Limit's first album releases. After disbanding from No Limit on May 14, 1996, Lil Ric would release his second album titled Wicked Streets via Solo Records. On August 8, 2000, Lil Ric would release his third album titled It's Like Armageddon via A.W.O.L., Noo Trybe, Virgin. On February 26, 2001, Fiend would release his fourth album titled The Thug Nut (On One) via Concrete Music. On August 28, 2012, Lil Ric would release his fifth album titled Plugged In - Live from the Streets via Ae'on Music Group Rapbay, Urbanlife Distribution, it would be his first album release in 11 years.

== Discography ==
=== Studio albums ===
List of studio albums, with selected chart positions
Title	Album details
Deep N Tha Game	Released: October 11, 1994; Label: No Limit; Format: CD, MD, LP
Wicked Streets	Released: May 14, 1996; Label: Solo; Format: CD, MD, LP
It's Like Armageddon	Released: August 8, 2000; Label: A.W.O.L., Noo Trybe, Virgin; Format: CD, MD, LP
The Thug Nut (On One)	Released: February 26, 2001; Label: Concrete Music, F.U. Payme; Format: CD, MD, LP
Plugged In - Live from the Streets	Released: August 28, 2012; Label: Ae'on Music Group, Rapbay, Urbanlife; Format: MD, LP

=== Collaboration albums ===
List of albums, with selected chart positions
Title	Album details
Different Reality (with Laroo)	Released: January 1, 2001; Label: Front Line Entertainment; Format: CD, MD, LP

== Singles ==
=== As lead artist ===
List of singles as lead artist, with selected chart positions and certifications, showing year released and album name
Title	Year	Album
"Ride Wid Me"	1994	Deep n tha Game
"Talk Of Tha Town"	1996	Wicked Streets
