= Burghausen City Museum =

Communal museum in Bavaria

- Stadtmuseum Burghausen
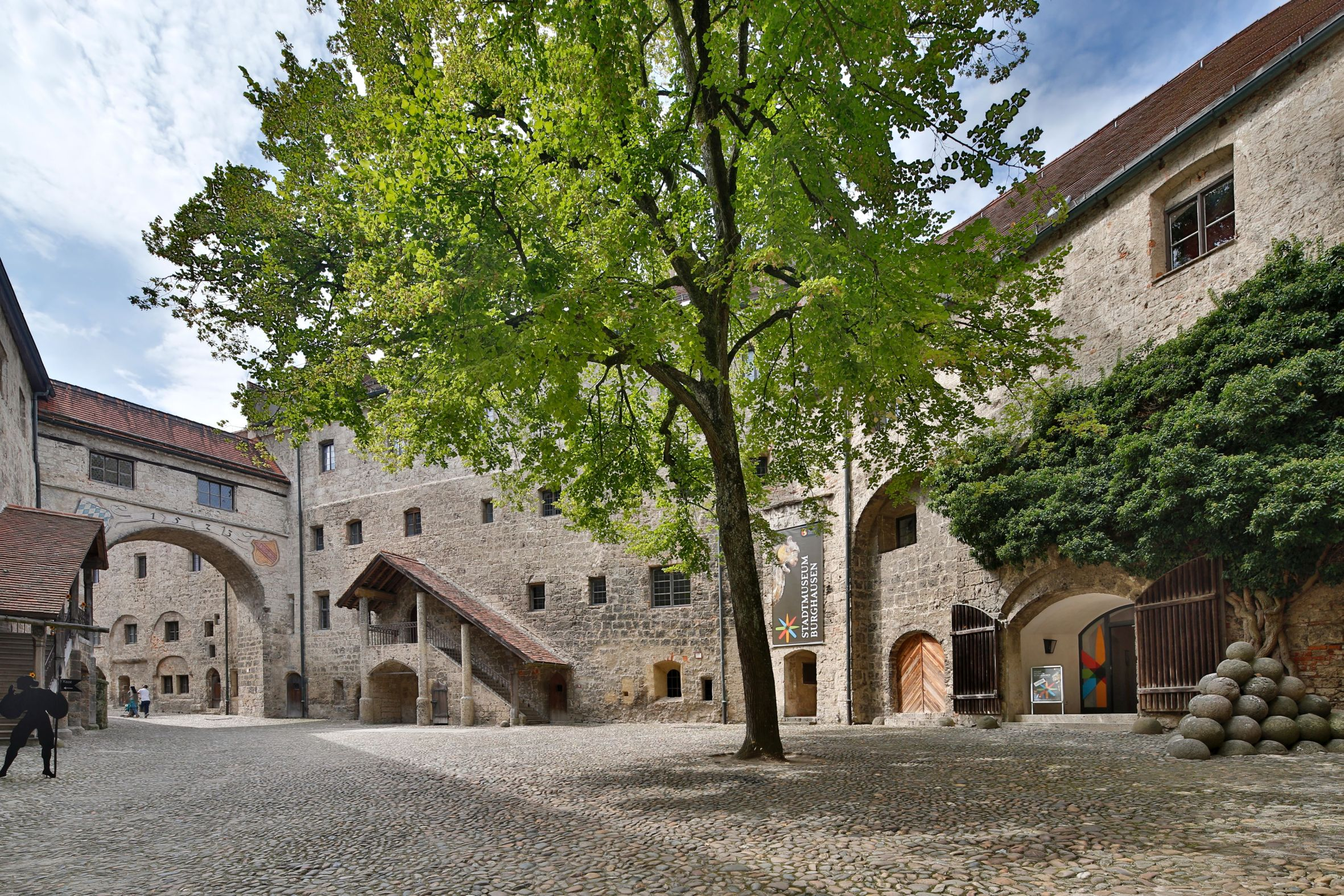

- Location within Bavaria
- Established: 1899
- Location: Burghausen Castle, Burghausen, Deutschland
- Coordinates: 48.156298°N 12.828941°E
- Type: Art museum, History museum, Natural History museum
- Visitors: 21,000 (2025)
- Director: Patrick Charell
- Website: www.stadtmuseum-burghausen.de

The Burghausen City Museum (German: Stadtmuseum Burghausen) is located within Burghausen Castle, the world’s longest castle complex at 1,051 m (3,448 ft). Founded in 1899, its diverse collections present the history, art, and culture of Burghausen and its surrounding region. From 2011 to 2025, the museum underwent comprehensive redevelopment and was completely redesigned as a cross-generational universal museum. Its four newly designed permanent exhibitions received the Bavarian Museum Prize.

== Location ==
Burghausen Castle is situated in a prominent landscape position on a ridge between the Alpine river Salzach and the Wöhrsee nature reserve. With a length of over one kilometre, it was declared the “Longest Castle in the World” by the Guinness Book of Records in 2010. The medieval bailey marks both the eastern end and the architectural focal point of the complex. The Burghausen City Museum is located in the former Kemenate (bower) of the bailey. Built in the mid-13th century, this western wing was extensively expanded from 1476 under Duke George the Rich of Bavaria-Landshut (1455–1503) and his wife, the Polish princess Hedwig (1457–1502), to include chambers for the female court as well as service and storage rooms.

== History ==
The history of the Burghausen City Museum essentially begins in 1891, when the garrison stationed at Burghausen castle left after more than 125 years. Following their departure, a sale to private owners or even demolition was considered. To prevent this, the Historical Association of Upper Bavaria proposed establishing an art gallery in the castle. The Bavarian government approved and in 1898, the “State Picture Gallery” moved into the Palas of the main castle. At the same time as the gallery’s founding, a group of Burghausen antiquarians began actively collecting objects of historical value. On 23 March 1899, they established the "Burghausen City Museum and Antiquities Association" (Stadtmuseums- und Altertumsverein Burghausen) and opened the Burghausen City Museum on 11 June 1899, in the gatekeeper’s room at the entrance of the main castle. In 1902, the Burghausen City Museum moved into a large vaulted hall on the ground floor of the Palas due to its steadily growing collection, thanks to donations but also by targeted acquisitions. These included ceramic fragments excavated by Heinrich Schliemann at Mycenae.

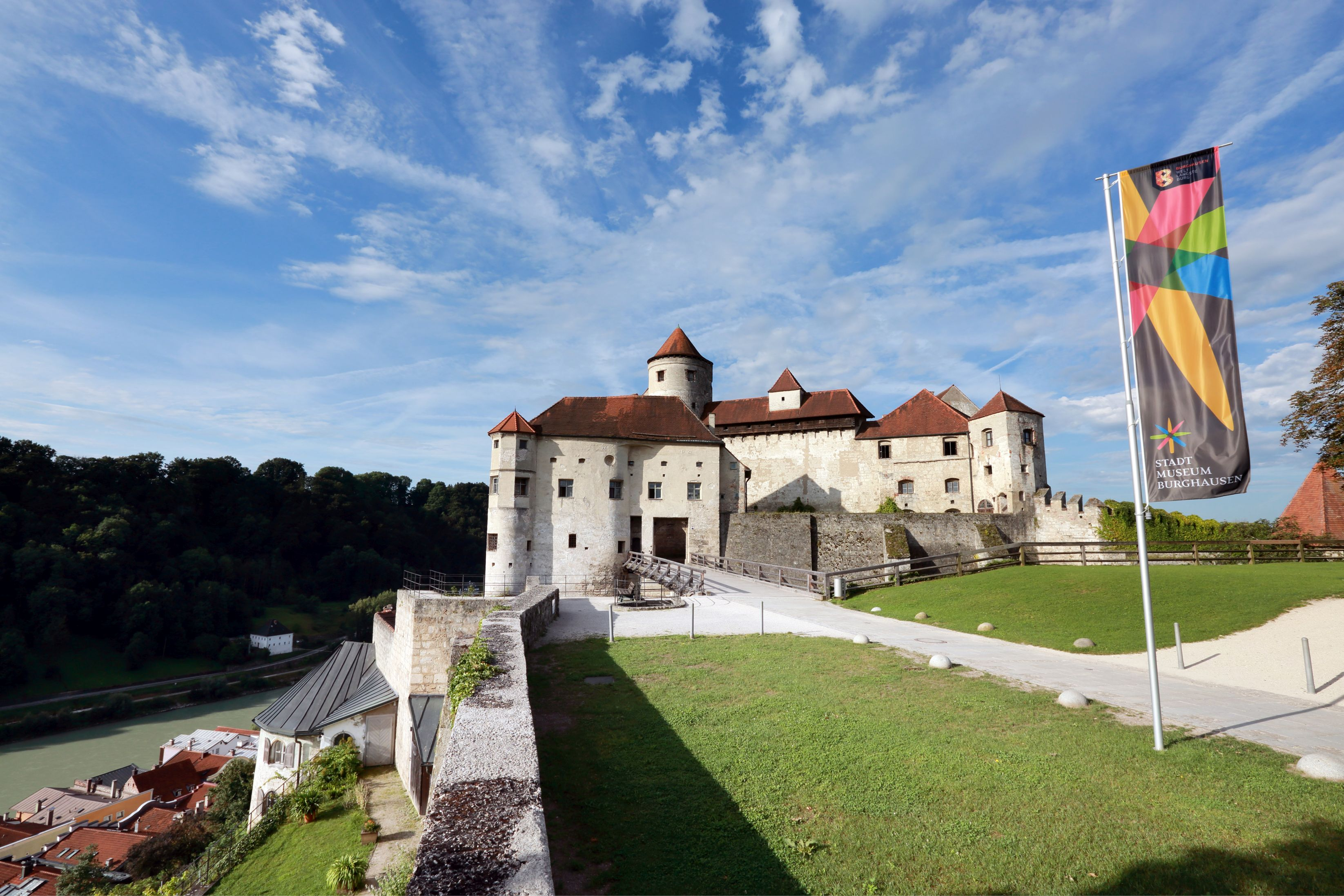
Burghausen Castle, Inner Keep

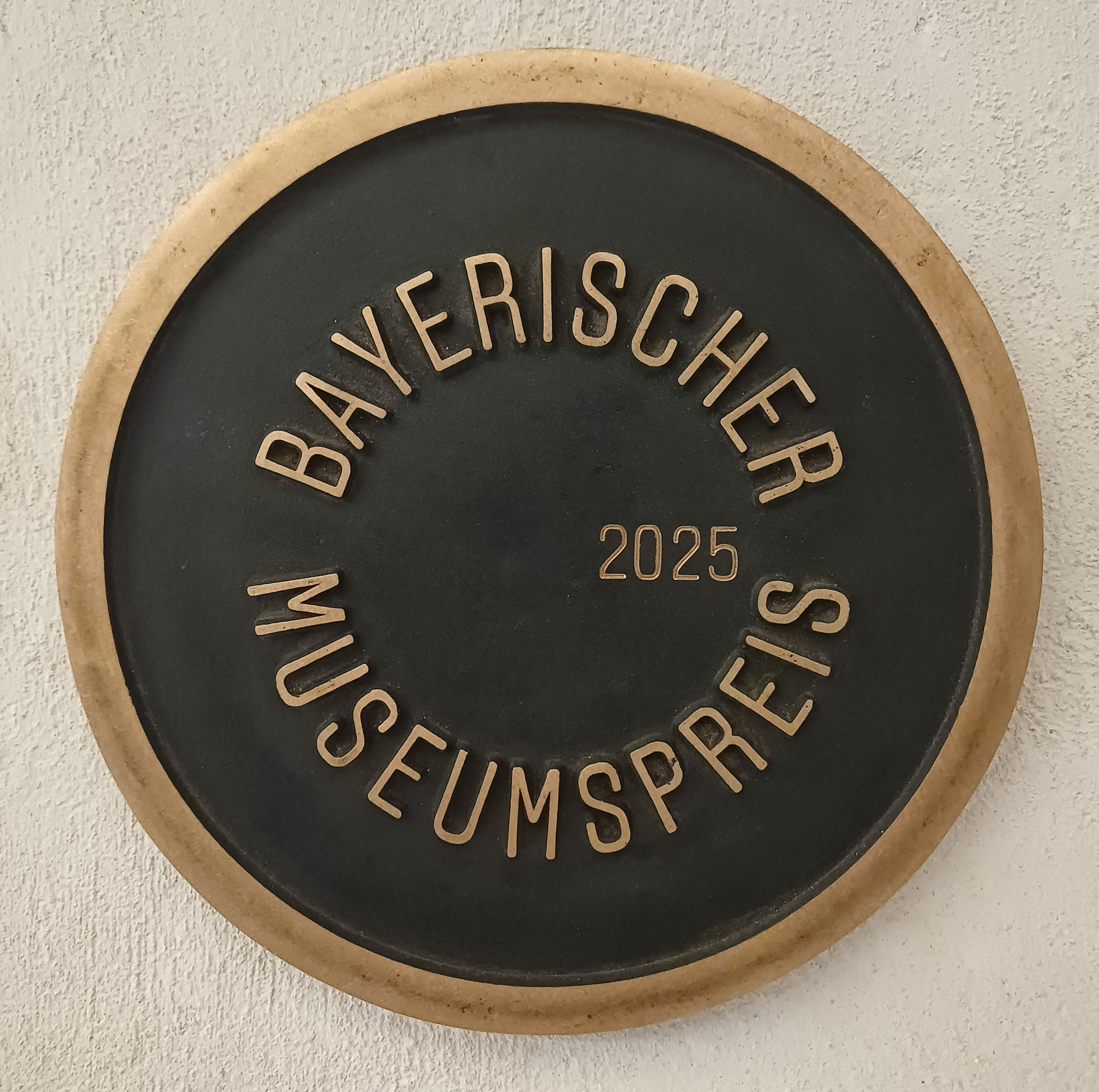
Plaque of the Bavarian Museum Award 2025 in the museum's entrance hall.

In 1907, the expanding museum moved for the last time, into the Kemenate (bower). Following several expansions, the Burghausen City Museum now covers the entire western wing of the main castle, with approximately 2,000 m² of exhibition space. In 2012, the Burghausen City Museum was host for the Bavarian State Exhibition "Allied. Enemies. In-laws. Bavaria and Austria", curated by the Haus der Bayerischen Geschichte. In preparation for the exhibition, the museum underwent renovation and infrastructure improvements. In 2011, a new central museum depot of 650 m² was inaugurated within the castle complex. A new museum entrance, an educational area, and additional rooms for museum operations and administration were created, and an elevator now provides access to the first and second floors. As the city of Burghausen has been responsible for the museum since 1970, the State Exhibition was also used as an opportunity to update nad modernise the aged permanent exhibitions. In 2016, the museum opened the departments "Life in the Castle in the Middle Ages" and "City History"; in 2019, the new permanent exhibition "Burghausen - City of Arts" was inaugurated; and in 2025, the natural history called "Salzach–Wöhrsee Natural Area" was opened on the third floor. For this department, as well as the museum’s successful didactic and design-oriented renovation, the Burghausen City Museum was awarded the Bavarian Museum Prize in the same year.

=== List of Directors ===
The following people have served as directors:

- 1899–1901: Joseph Halder
- 1901–1929: Karl Stechele
- 1929–1942: Anton Asböck
- 1942–1953: Hans Kammerer
- 1953–1973: Josef Pfennigmann
- 1973–2005: Christine and Josef Schneider
- 2005–2025: Eva Gilch
- 2025–present: Patrick Charell

== Permanent Exhibitions ==
=== Castle Life in the Late Middle Ages ===
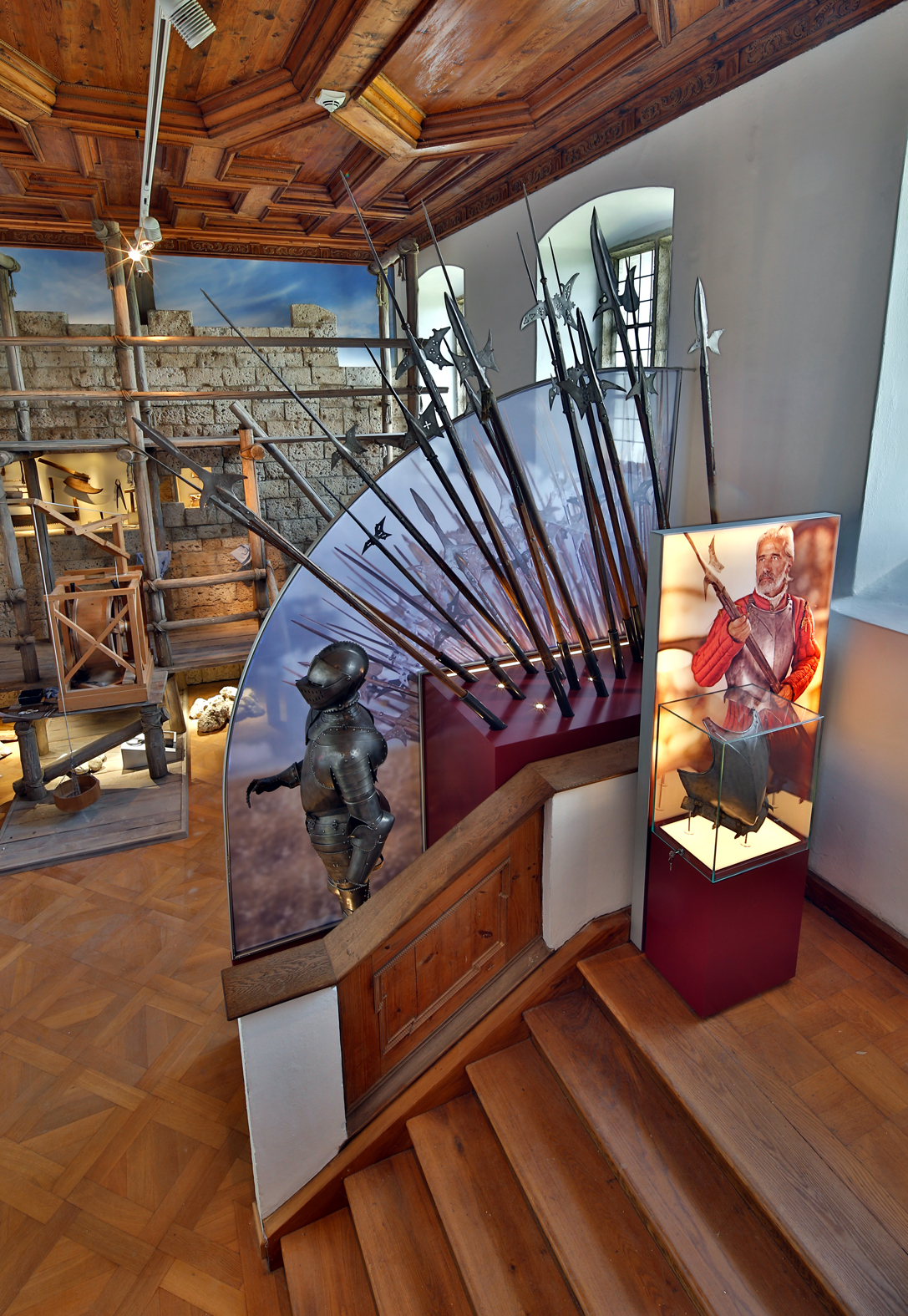
Burghausen City Museum, view into the exhibition "Castle Life in the Late Middle Ages" (est. 2016)

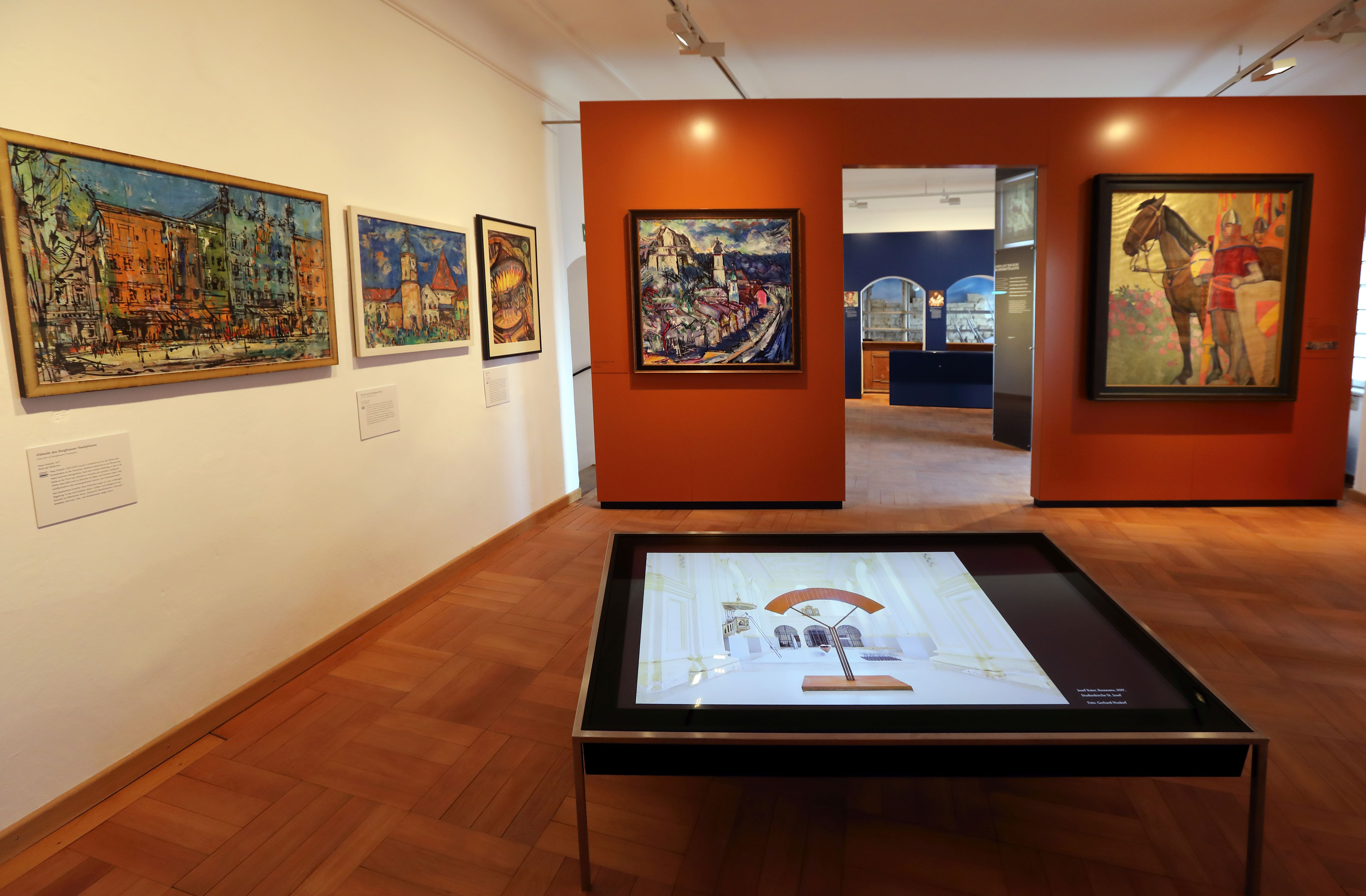
Burghausen City Museum, departement "Contemporary Art of the 20th century" (est. 2019).

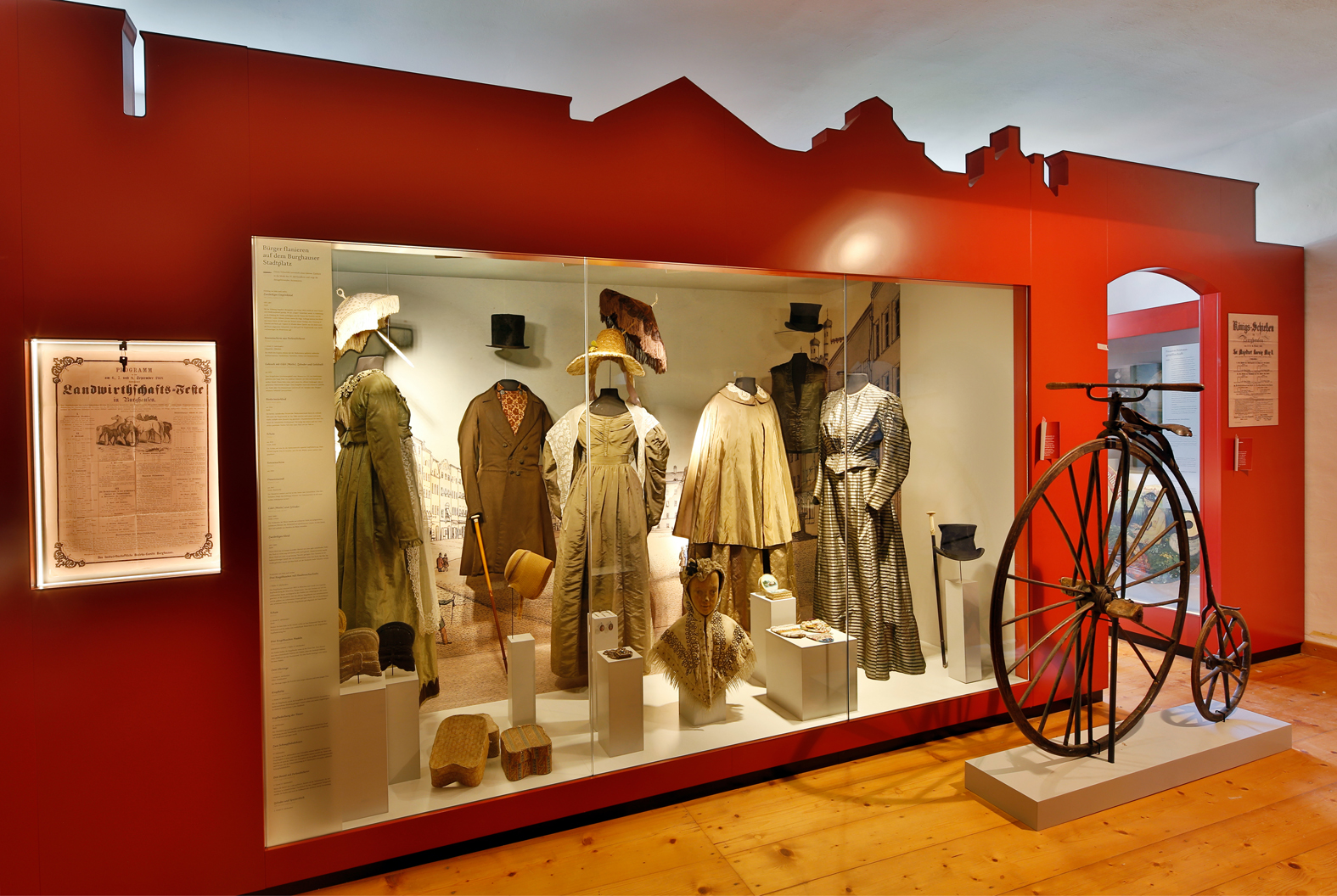
Burghausen City Museum, display in "Civic Life" (est. 2016)

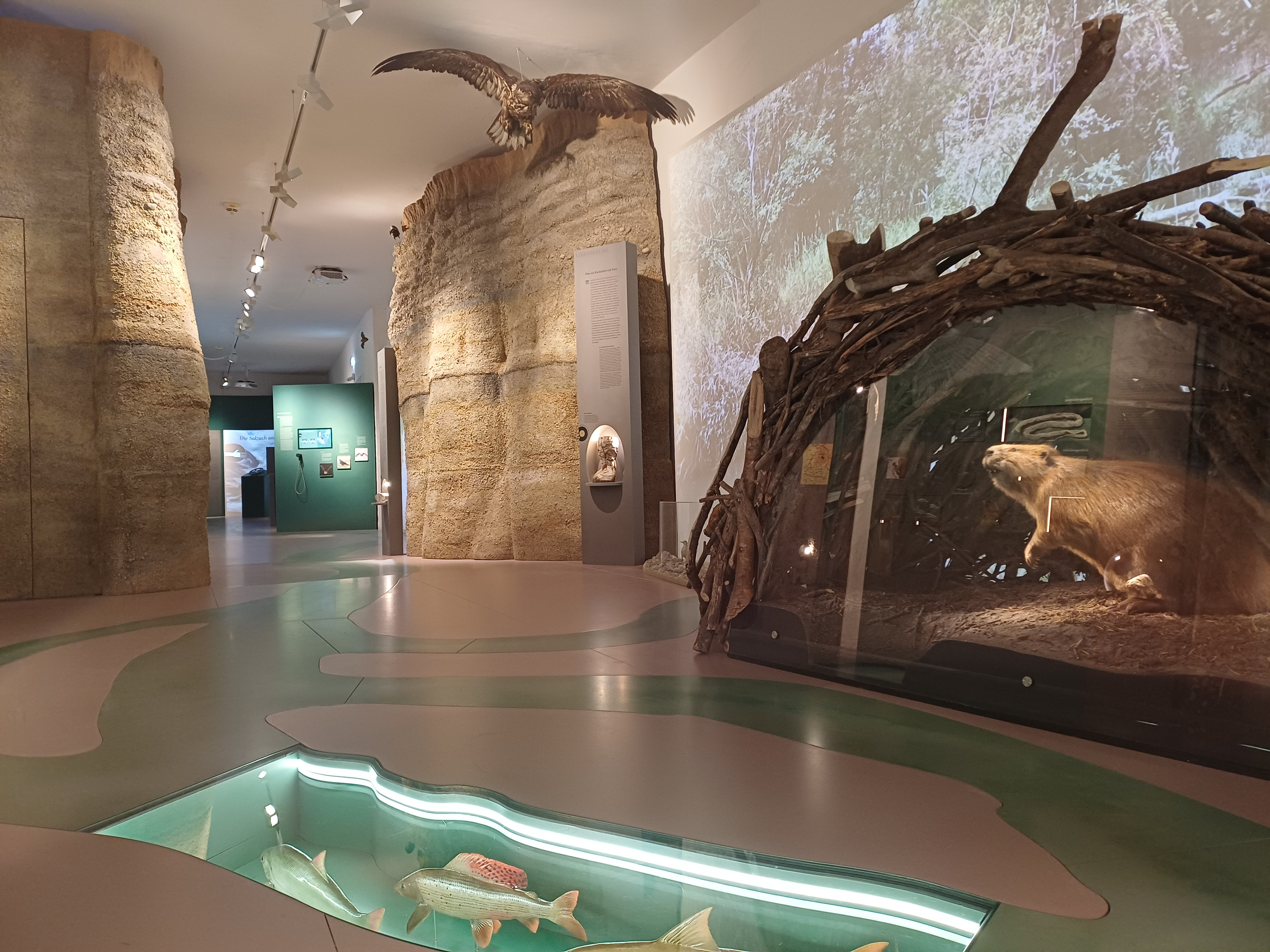
View into the exhibition "Habitat Salzach-Wöhrsee" (est. 2025)

On the ground floor of the Burghausen City Museum, visitors can explore how life was conducted at a princely residence at the end of the 15th century. This department uses immersive displays and interactive stations to convey information about castle construction, living conditions, hygiene, food, fashion, and leisure in the Late Middle Ages. A reconstructed scaffold demonstrates historic building techniques with tools and an operable treadwheel crane. An ornately decorated original beam testifies to the major castle expansion from 1476. Life-sized figures provide a backdrop for visitors to try on historical clothing and learn about medieval fashion. In the kitchen, local and exotic spices are presented. Leisure activities at court, including hunting, tournaments, feasts, and games, are explained and can be experienced interactively. Visitors may participate in a mock joust, admire a suit of knightly armor, or try one of the contemporary social games.

=== Burghausen, City of Arts ===
The first floor is dedicated to art in Burghausen from the Middle Ages to the present. Topics such as fresco and mural painting, portraiture, and religious artworks are presented in an interactive and accessible manner. As a residence and later a governmental city, Burghausen hosted affluent patrons. Since the Middle Ages, specialized craftsmen—including master builders, stonemasons, and, from the late 16th century, painter and sculptor workshops—fulfilled these commissions. Among the most prominent artists during the Baroque period in Burghausen were the painter Johann Nepomuk della Croce (1736–1819) and the sculptor Johann Georg Lindt (c. 1733–1795). Their works, alongside those of numerous other local artists, are on display. A highlight is the scale model of the Marienberg Pilgrimage Church, constructed in 1760/64, which is the only surviving South German architectural model from the 18th century showing both interior and exterior details, including full decoration and color schemes. Around the turn of the 20th century, the three “artist princes” Maximilian Liebenwein (1869–1926), Walter Ziegler (1859–1932), and Richard Strebel (1861–1940) shaped Burghausen’s artistic life. Through their connections with the Vienna Secession and the Innviertel Artists’ Guild, they fostered a vibrant local art scene. During World War II, Albert Figel (1859–1932) moved from Munich to Burghausen and in 1947 became a founding member of the modern artists’ group DIE BURG. The exhibition concludes with works from the 1950s and 1960s.

=== Urban History ===
The second floor focuses on Burghausen’s city history. Early archaeological finds document the first human settlement as well as Celtic and Roman presence in the region. Burghausen experienced its peak during the Middle Ages, with the salt trade and shipping on the Salzach River bringing significant wealth. A detailed replica of Jakob Sandtner’s 1574 city model illustrates the appearance of the city at that time. In 1688, the city was designated a “capital” (Hauptstadt), with judicial authority exercised by the local magistrate on behalf of the Wittelsbach rulers. The executioner’s sword of the last Burghausen executioner, displayed in the museum, attests to this authority. A large section covers everyday life in the Burghausen citizenry, including social institutions such as almshouses and hospitals, guilds, trade, associations, and education. The 18th and 19th centuries are represented through scenographic exhibition design, illustrating the economic and political decline. Visitors learn who could attain communal citizenship and the official attire worn by the mayor during the Rococo period. Burghausen’s history as a garrison town until 1891 is highlighted as well. Early 20th-century tourism and artistic interest in the picturesque town and castle are also showcased through a rich collection of city views. The establishment of Wacker Chemie in 1916 marked Burghausen’s transformation into an industrial city, and visitors enter the 20th century through a reconstructed factory gate. Life in Burghausen under National Socialism is illustrated using a walkable 1935 city map. In the postwar section, a pair of PVC women’s shoes produced around 1947 by the local chemical industry is displayed; in 2019, these were recognized as one of Bavaria’s 100 “Heimat treasures”. Films covering the last decades of the 20th century up to the present are available in the museum cinema.

=== Habitat Salzach-Wöhrsee ===
The latest exhibition – opened in 2025 – is dedicated to the flora and fauna between Salzach River and Lake Wöhrsee. Along the last 60 kilometres of the Salzach before its confluence with the Inn, a notable natural landscape has been preserved and classified as a FFH area (a habitat of European importance). The exhibition highlights diverse habitats along the Salzach, including the river and adjacent floodplains, beech slopes with woodruff in spring, and the Salzach gorge known as the "Burghauser Enge", as well as the lake Wöhrsee basin, a glacial oxbow of the Salzach. Conservation projects, such as the reintroduction of the Northern Bald Ibis (Waldrapp) and protected habitats for Aesculapian snakes, jackdaws, and bats, are also featured. This natural history section, like the ground floor, emphasizes experiential learning. Immersive light projections and realistic models, combined with taxidermy specimens and interactive stations, allow visitors to explore four different natural habitats. Information is provided on the lifestyles of local animals and the formation of the travertine used in the castle’s construction. A dedicated area examines the 19th- and 20th-century straightening of the Salzach and its environmental consequences.

Further impressions of the Burghausen City Museum
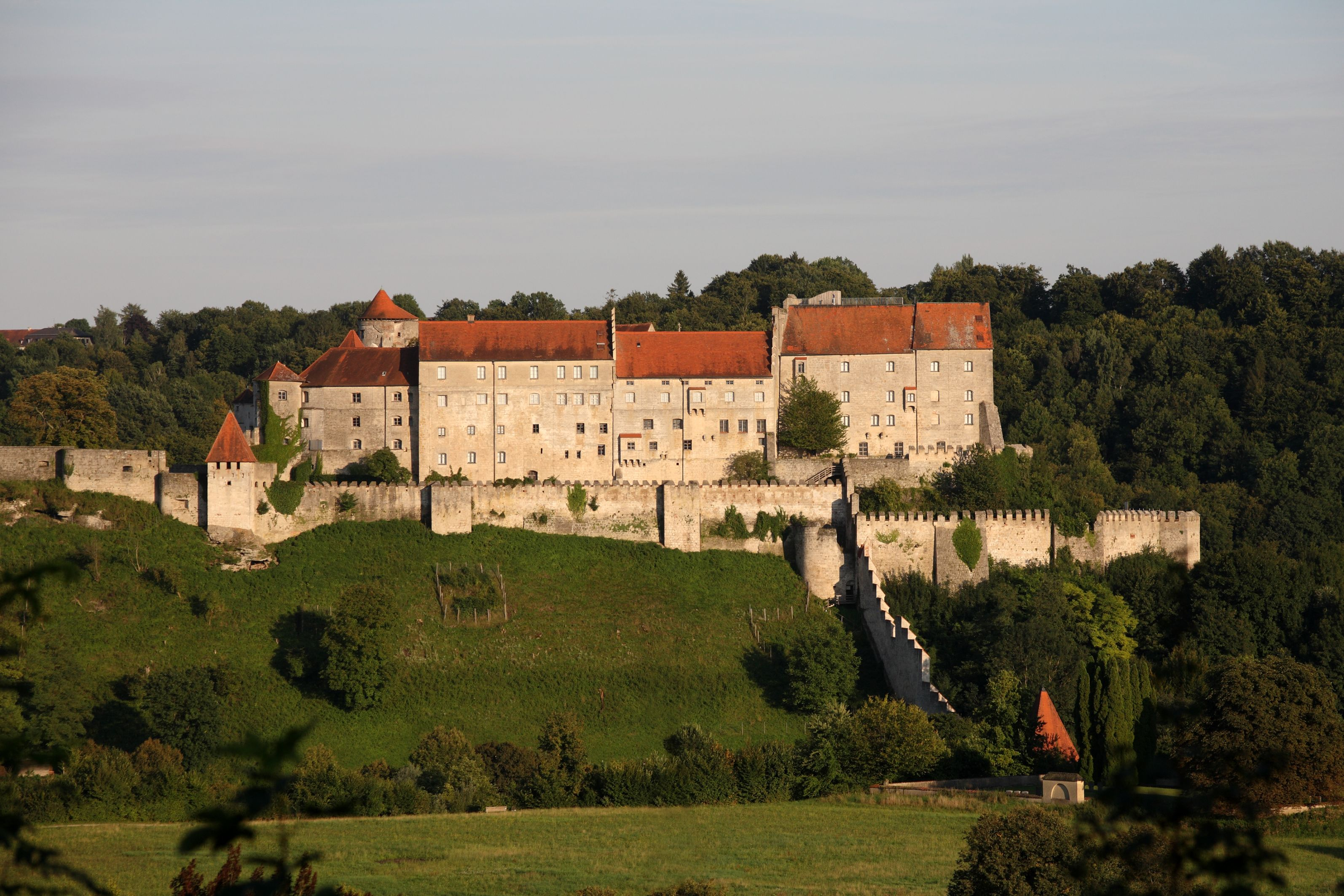
Burghausen Castle from the West, view of the former bower – today the City Museum

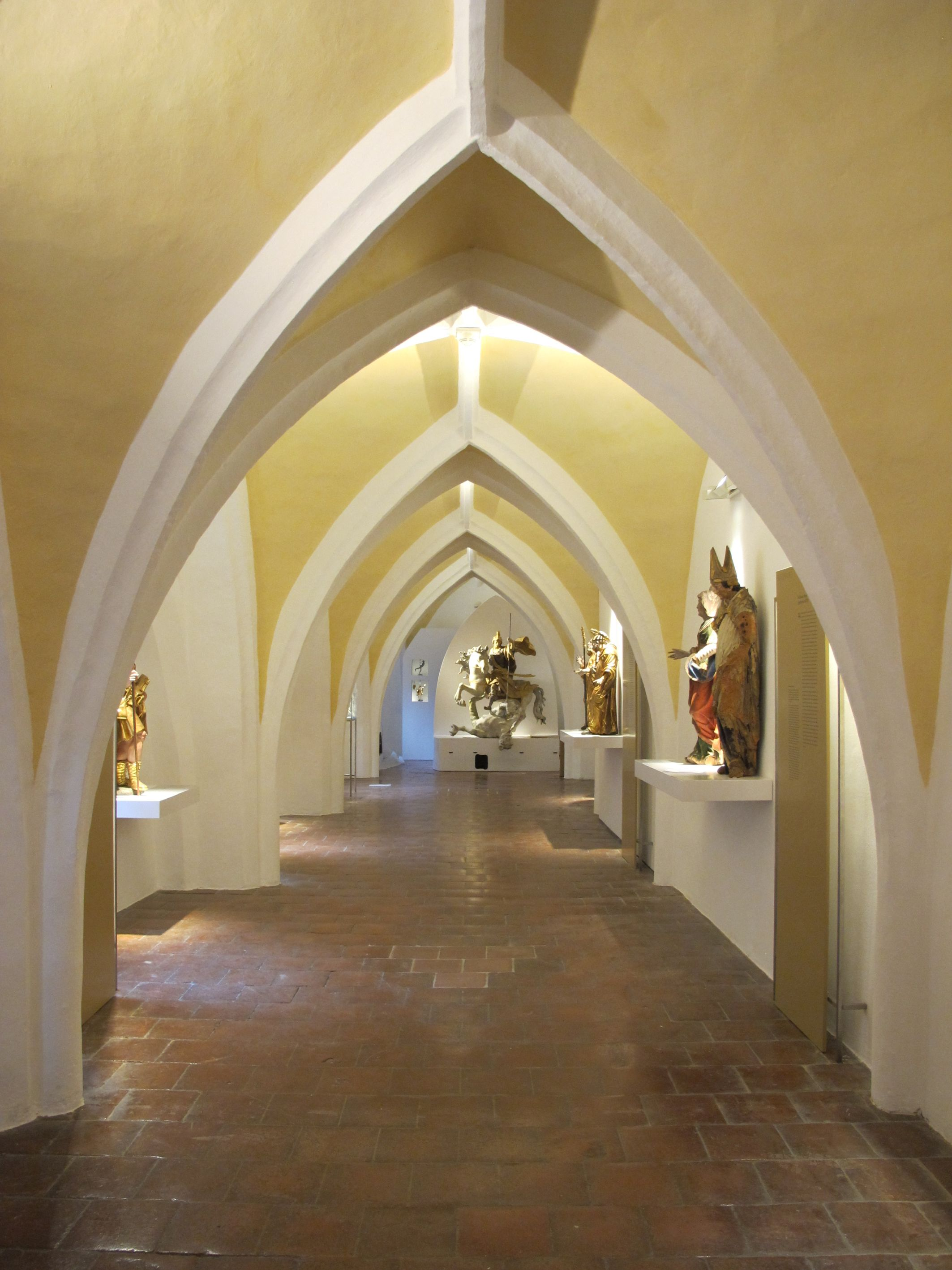
Gothic vault in the exhibition "City of Arts" with Gothic and Baroque sculptures.

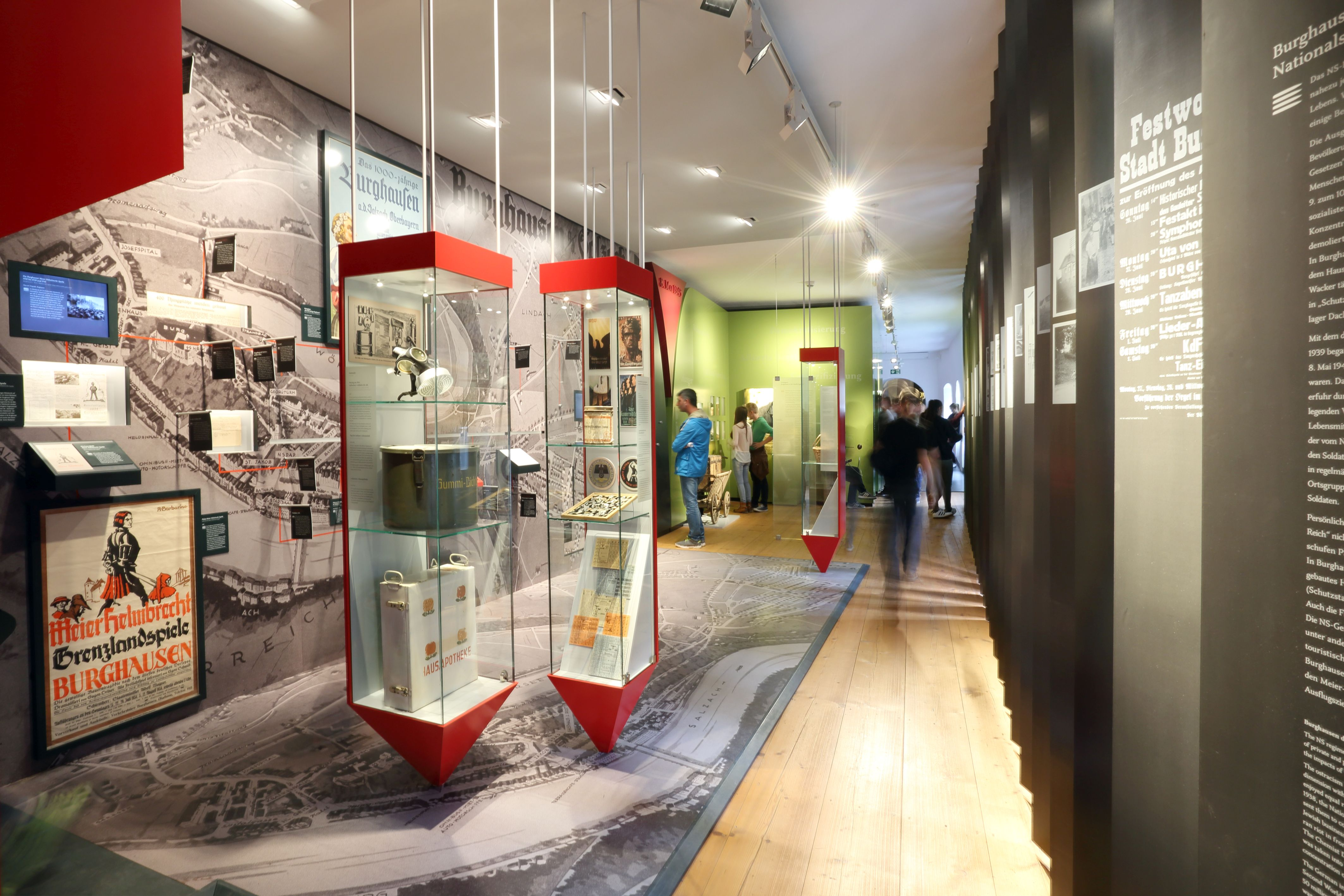
Burghausen City Museum, Urban History, department “Burghausen in National Socialism”.

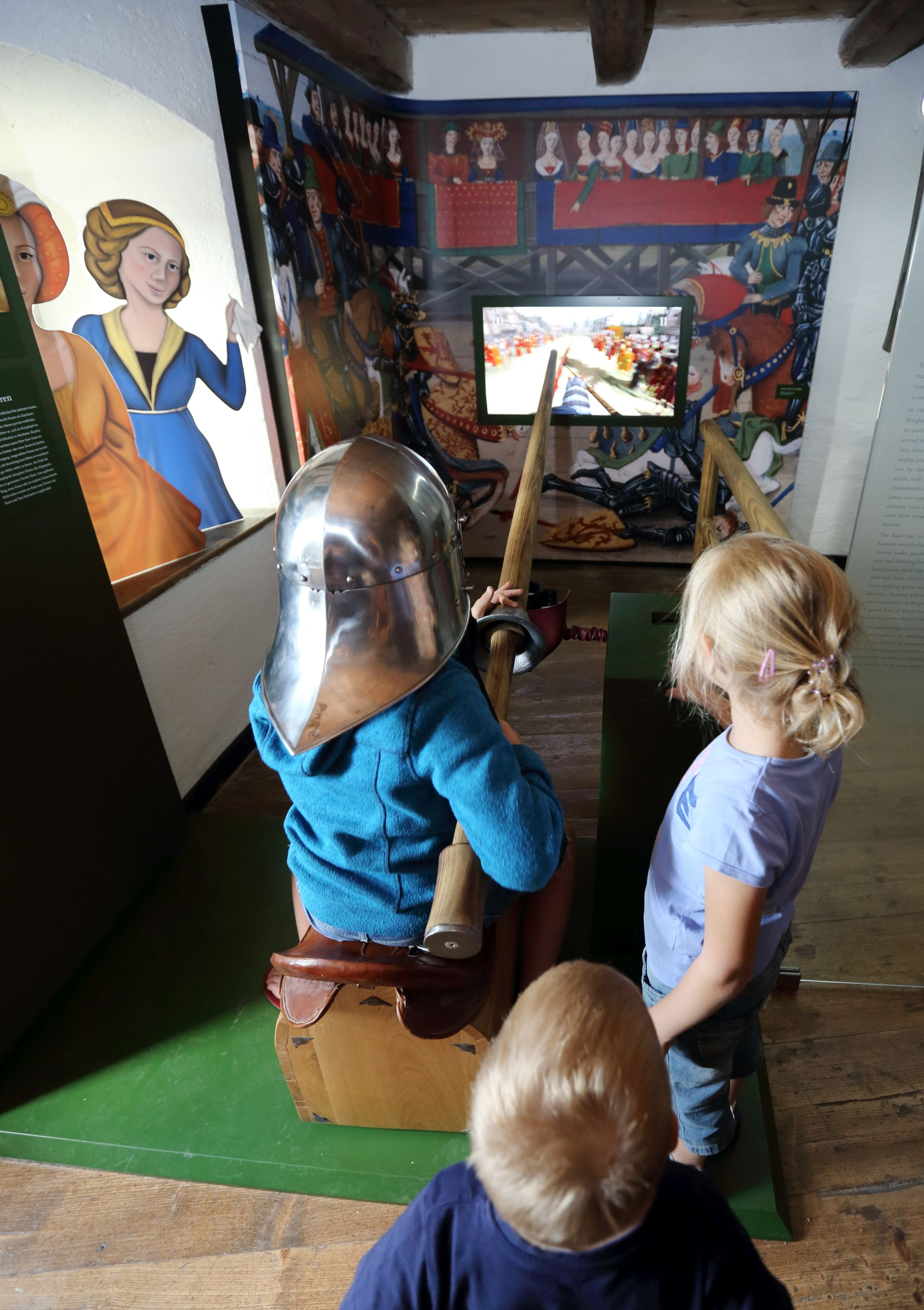
Jousting simulator in the department “Castle Life in the Late Middle Ages”.

== Weblinks ==
Media related to Stadtmuseum Burghausen at Wikimedia Commons

- Official website of the Burghausen City Museum
- Burghausen City Museum In: Burghausen.de
- Burghausen City Museum In: Museen-in-Bayern.de

== Literature ==
- Museums- und Altertumsverein Burghausen: Führer durch das Städt. Museum in der k. Burg zu Burghausen a. Salzach. Burghausen [1928].
- Josef Schneider, Stadt Burghausen (publisher): Stadtmuseum Burghausen. Führer durch die Sammlungen des Museums. Burghausen 1984.
- Alois Buchleitner, Josef Schneider: 90 Jahre Stadtmuseum und Heimatverein Burghausen. Burghausen 1989 (= Burghauser Geschichtsblätter 44).
- Alois Buchleitner, Johann Dorner, Max Hingerl, Josef Pfennigmann: Sechshundert Jahre Rentamt Burghausen. Burghausen 1992 (= Burghauser Geschichtsblätter 47).
- Dieter Goerge: Johann Nepomuk della Croce 1736–1819. Leben und Werk des Burghauser Barockmalers. Burghausen 1998 (= Burghauser Geschichtsblätter 50).
- Wolfgang David, Johann Dorner: 100 KunstStücke aus dem Stadtmuseum Burghausen. Burghausen 1999 (= Burghauser Geschichtsblätter 51).
- Ulrich Schmid, Heimatverein Burghausen (publisher): Geschichte der Stadt Burghausen 1861–1918. Burghausen 1999.
- Josef Schneider, Eva Gilch: Geschnitten, gestochen, gedruckt, gemalt, gezeichnet und – geliebt: Burghausen. Stadtansichten von 1500 bis 1960. 2. ed. Burghausen 2003.
- Johann Dorner: Herzogin Hedwig und ihr Hofstaat. Das Alltagsleben auf der Burg Burghausen nach Originalquellen des 15. Jahrhunderts. 3. ed. Burghausen 2004 (= Burghauser Geschichtsblätter 53).
- Brigitte Langer, Johann Georg von Hohenzollern: Burg zu Burghausen. Official Guide issued by the Bayerische Verwaltung der staatlichen Schlösser, Gärten und Seen. 2. act. ed. Munich 2011.
- Karl Stechele, Heimatverein Burghausen (publisher): Die Burg von Burghausen. New ed. Burghausen 2020.
- Eva Gilch (author), Gerhard Nixdorf (photography), Heimatverein Burghausen (publisher): Burghauser Künstler und ihre Werke. Eine Auswahl. Burghausen 2020.
