= Burghausen Castle =

Castle in Burghausen, Germany

Coordinates: 48°09′22″N 12°49′44″E

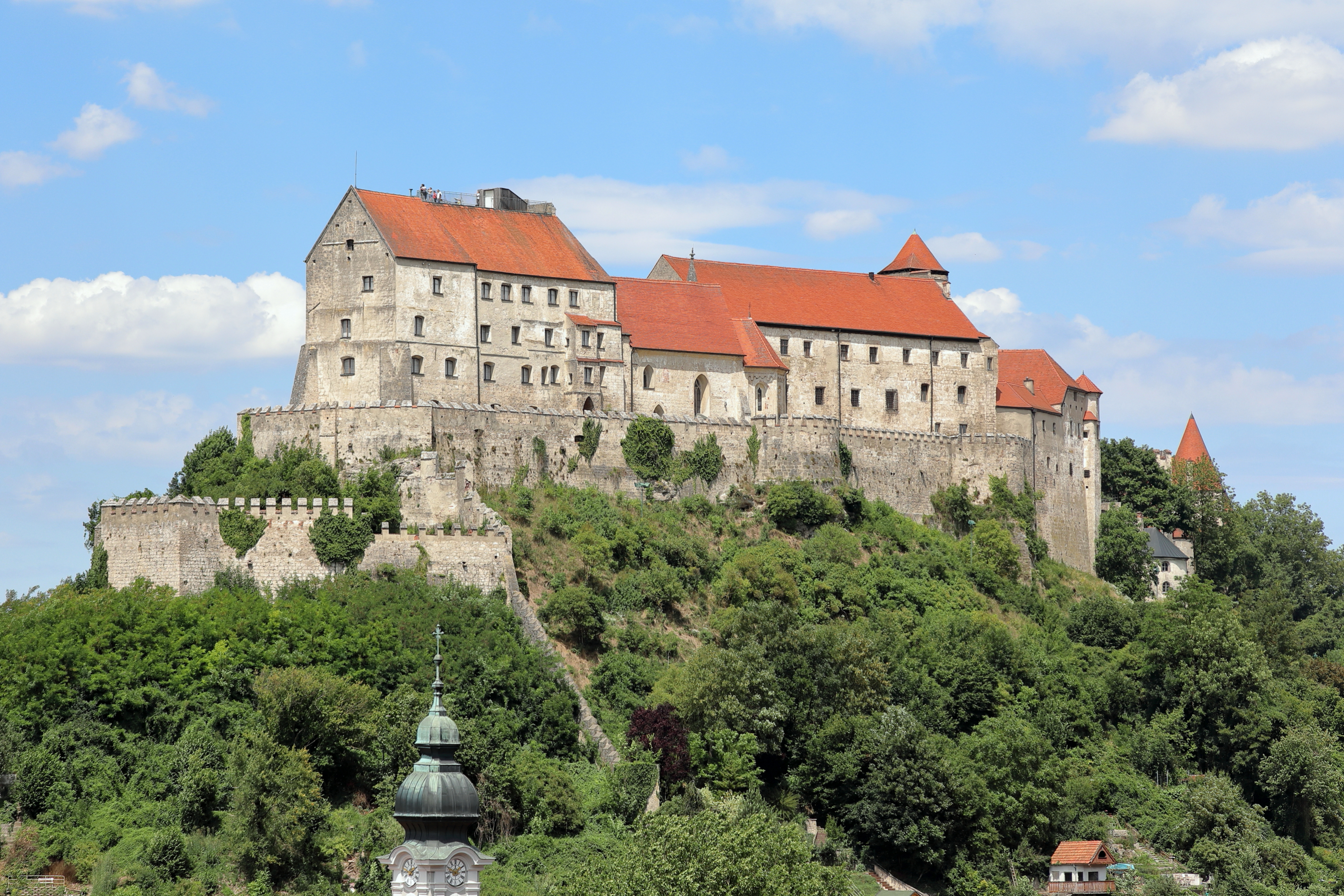
Palas of the Burghausen Castle

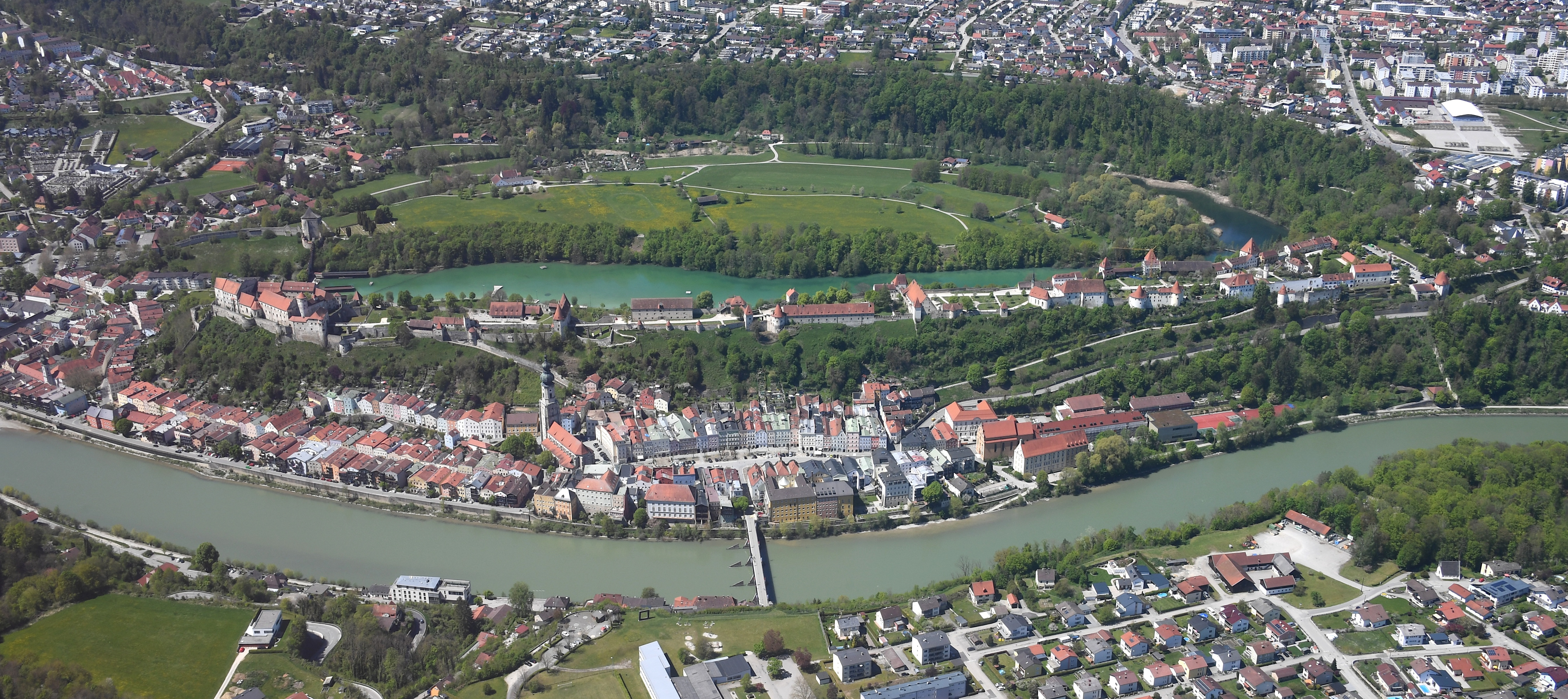
Aerial image of the Burghausen Castle from the east

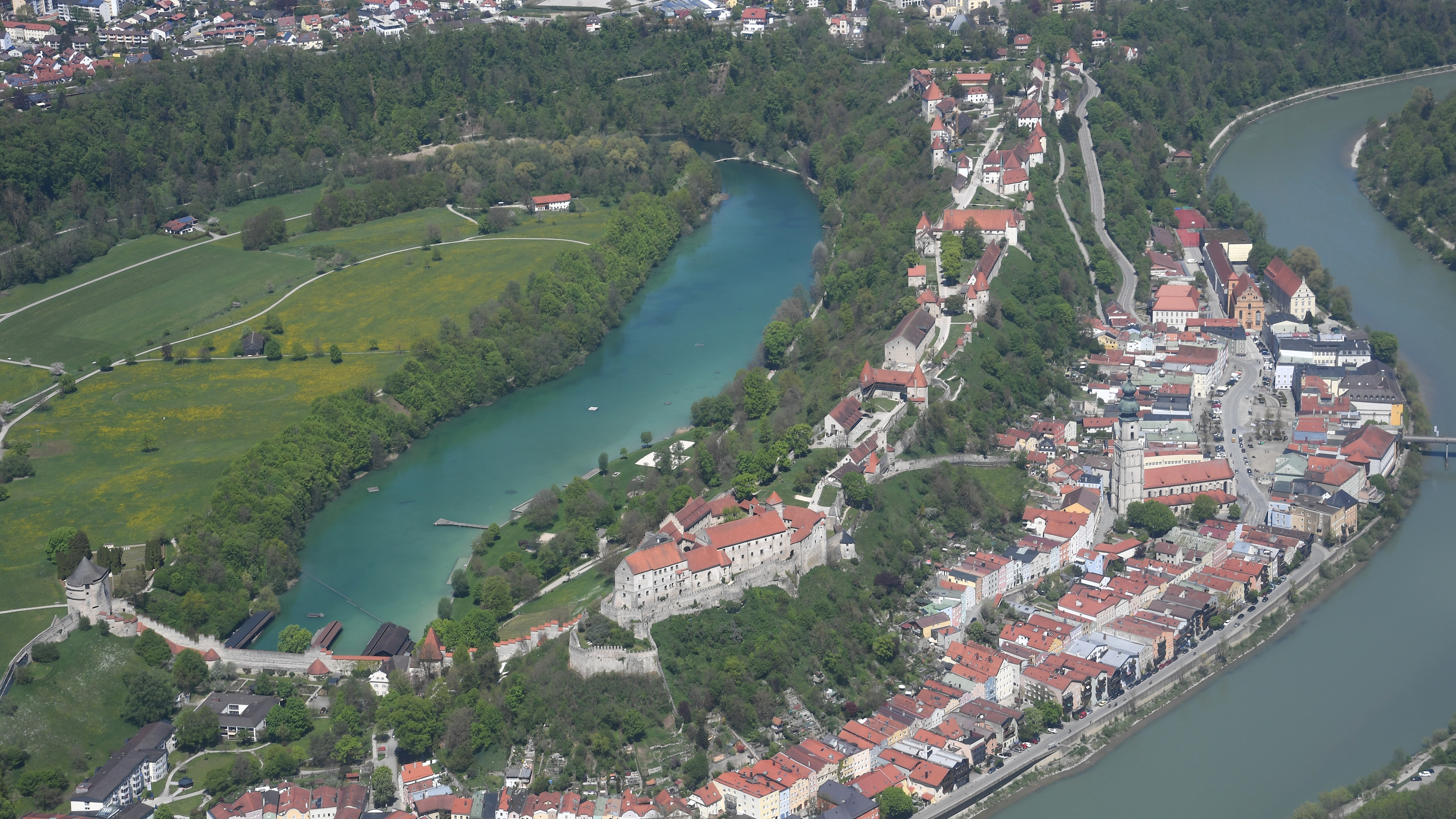
Aerial image of the Burghausen Castle from the south

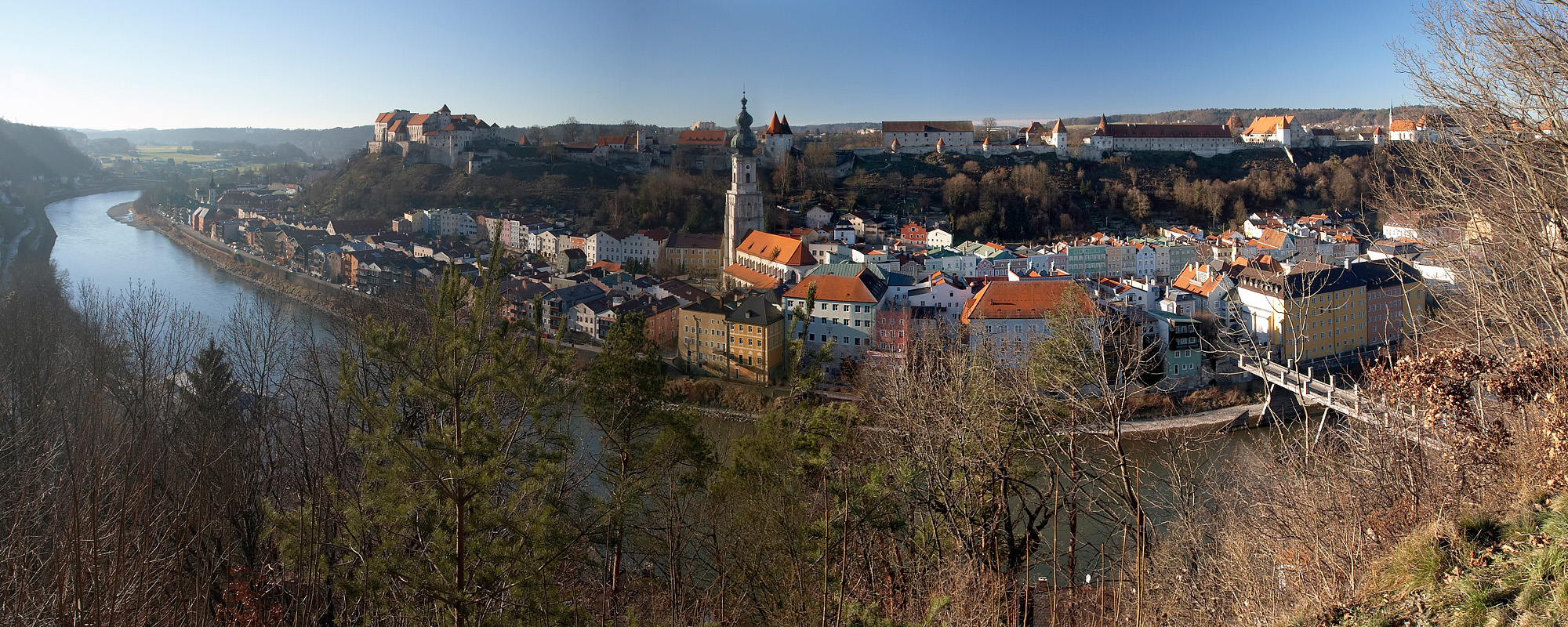
Burghausen city and Burghausen Castle seen from the Austrian side of the River Salzach

Burghausen Castle in Burghausen, Upper Bavaria, is the longest castle complex in the world (1051 m), confirmed by the Guinness World Record company, and the third largest. The castle is therefore also among the largest palaces in the world.

== History ==
The castle hill was settled as early as the Bronze Age. The castle (which was founded before 1025) was transferred to the Wittelsbachs after the death of the last count of Burghausen, Gebhard II, in 1168. In 1180 they were appointed dukes of Bavaria and the castle was extended under Duke Otto I of Wittelsbach.

With the first partition of Bavaria in 1255, Burghausen Castle became the second residence of the dukes of Lower Bavaria, the main residence being Landshut. The work on the main castle commenced in 1255 under Duke Henry XIII (1253–1290). In 1331 Burghausen and its castle passed to Otto IV, Duke of Lower Bavaria.

Under the dukes of Bavaria-Landshut (1392-1503), the fortifications were extended around the entire castle hill. Starting with Margarete of Austria, the deported wife of the despotic Duke Henry XVI (1393–1450), the castle became the residence of the Duke's consorts and widows, and also a stronghold for the ducal treasures. In 1447 Louis VII, Duke of Bavaria died in the castle as Henry's prisoner. Under Duke Georg of Bavaria (1479–1503) the work was completed and Burghausen Castle became the strongest fortress of the region.

After the reunification of Bavaria in 1505 with the Landshut War of Succession the castle had military importance, and due to the threat of the Ottoman Empire it was subsequently modernised. During the Thirty Years War, Gustav Horn was kept imprisoned in the castle from 1634 to 1641. After the Treaty of Teschen in 1779 Burghausen Castle became a border castle. During the Napoleonic Wars the castle suffered some destruction. The 'Liebenwein tower' was occupied by the painter Maximilian Liebenwein from 1899 until his death. He decorated the interior in the Art Nouveau style.

== Architecture ==
The gothic castle comprises the main castle with the inner courtyard and five outer courtyards.

The outermost point of the Hauptburg (main castle is the Palas with the ducal private rooms. Today it houses the Castle Museum, including a branch gallery of the Bavarian State Picture Collection. On the town side of the main castle next to the donjon are the Chapel of St. Elizabeth (1255) and the Dürnitz (knights' hall) with its two vaulted halls; directly opposite lies the Kemenate (ladies' bower) with the Burghausen City Museum.

The first outer courtyard protected the main castle and also included the stables, the brewery and the bakery. The second courtyard houses the large Arsenal building (1420) and the gunsmith's tower. This yard is protected by the dominant Saint George's Gate (1494). The Grain Tower and the Grain Measure Tower were used for stabling and to store animal food; they belong to the third courtyard. The main sight of the fourth courtyard is the late Gothic outer Chapel of St. Hedwig (1479–1489). The court officials and craftsmen worked and lived in the fifth courtyard, which was once protected by a strong fortification. In 1800 this fortification was destroyed by the French under Michel Ney.

The Pulverturm ("Powder Tower", constructed before 1533) protected the castle in the western valley next to the Wöhrsee lake, an old backwater of the river. A battlement connects this tower with the main castle.

=== Images of the castle ===
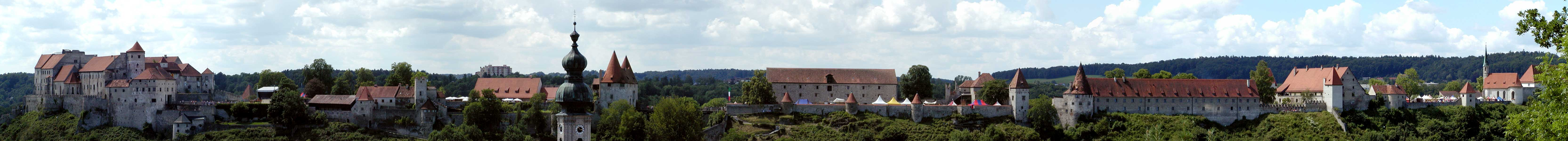
Panoramic view of the castle (view from east)

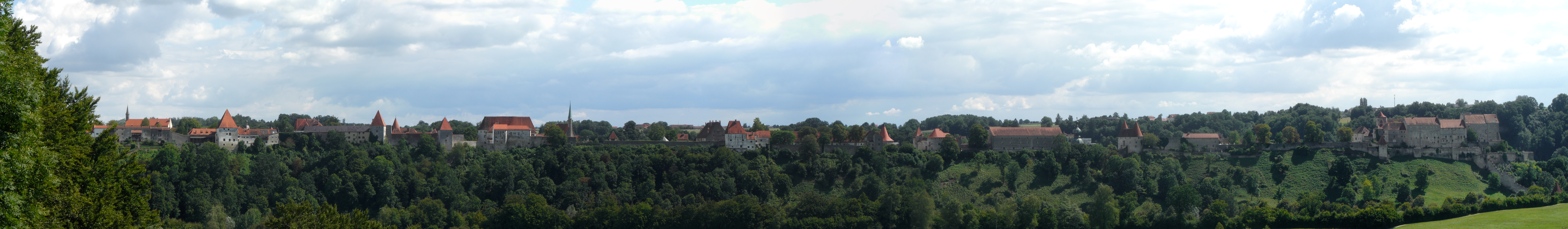
Panoramic view of the castle (view from west)
