= List of largest palaces =

Sizes of palaces around the world

The following is a list of some of the largest buildings that are considered palaces in terms by area. The title of the "world's largest palace" is both difficult to award and controversial, as different countries use different standards to claim that their palace is the largest in the world.

The title of world's largest palace by area enclosed within the palace's fortified walls is held by China's Forbidden City complex in Beijing, which covers an area of 728,000 square metres (180 acres). The 980 buildings of the Forbidden City have a combined floor space of 1,614,600 square feet (150,001 m^{2}) and contain 9,999 rooms (the ancient Chinese believed the god Yù Huáng had 10,000 rooms in his palace; so they constructed an earthly palace to have 9,999 and a half rooms, slightly fewer than in the divine palace, out of respect).

The world's largest official residence of a head of state is at the Kremlin Square at Moscow, Russian Federation. The Kremlin Square's earliest contemporary parts were made in 1159. The contemporary Terem palace building was made from 1839 to 1848, to serve as the Moscow residence to the tsar and his family. After the Russian Revolution 1917, it would also be used for meetings and conferences of the Supreme Soviet of the USSR and the residence for General secretary of the Soviet Union. It now has become the seat of president of the Russian Federation since the dissolution of the Soviet Union in 1991. The palace has five reception halls, out of them the Georgievsky Hall which is still used today for state and diplomatic receptions and official ceremonies; International treaties are signed within the Vladimirsky Hall, the Tsarina's Golden Chamber, the Terem Palace, and the Palace of Congresses are Aleksandrovsky are held at the Hall and Andreyevsky Hall were combined with forming the Kremlin as how it is today. The Grand Kremlin Palace by itself has an area of 25,000 square metres (270,000 sq ft), within triangular walls, which measures 2,235 meters in length with its walls having the thickness of 3.5 to 6.5 meters and 20 towers. The highest tower, Troitskaya, is around 80 meters in height with its proximity within the Kremlin Square. The palace measures 124 meters by 47 meters, the Terem palace had 9 churches and 700 rooms in the 3 storied building it adds up to the area of 28 hectares or 275,000 square metres (2,960,000 sq ft), as a 'city within a city' and therefore making it the biggest residential building for the head of state, in the world, when the Kremlin is also thereby included within the structure.

There is ongoing debate about the biggest palatial building and complex of the head of the state of a country, lies in differentiation between what is considered a presidential complex and a singular palatial building estate, even some estimates indicate, if judging solely by a single building complex. The world's largest official residence of a head of state would be Rashtrapati Bhavan, New Delhi, Republic of India. This is the official residence of the President of India, located at the western end of Rajpath, Raisina Hill in New Delhi. The Presidential Estate is spread across 130 hectares of land area, which houses the main H-shaped building covering a massive 200,000 square metres (2,200,000 sq ft) of total floor area across 340 massive rooms and featuring a total of 2.50 kilometre long corridors. The entire structure was built using 700 million bricks and 3,000,000 cu ft (85,000 m3) of stone with little steel. The primary building sits in the centre of the estate, surrounded by multiple official buildings, massive yet beautiful gardens, lawns and large courtyards. Therefore, bigger than Grand Kremlin palace when compared on basis of building than entire palatial complex.

The world's largest private residence of a monarch is the Istana Nurul Iman in Brunei, with 200,000 square metres (2,200,000 sq ft) of floor space and contains 1,788 rooms. The building also has 257 bathrooms, a banqueting hall that can seat 5,000 guests, a garage that can fit 110 cars, five swimming pools, and an air-conditioned stable that can fit up to 200 polo ponies.

The Potala Palace in Lhasa, Tibet, with 1000 rooms on 13 levels, and over 130,000 square metres (1,400,000 sq ft) of floor space, is one of the largest palaces in the world by floor area. It was the winter residence of the Dalai Lama until 1959. (Many sources give the area as 360,000 square metres (3,900,000 sq ft).)

In the castle category, Prague and Malbork castles claim to be the world's largest. However, the task is made more difficult by the fact that castles underwent changes over centuries and were not originally intended to be palaces, but military strongholds, although most of the existing castles were either converted to palaces or a palace building was added to them. In addition to the difficulty of area measurement by floor area, land area and garden area, we are faced the question if the castle should be considered as it exists or in its historically most extended form. Prague castle is the biggest castle according to the Guinness Book of Records with area of 70,000 square metres (750,000 square feet), but this area does not contain the castle gardens, stables and Letohrádek Královny Anny located on a separate hill. Malbork Castle claims to be the biggest and bases this claim on the property lot size listed in UNESCO world heritage records with a lot size of 18.038 ha (44.57 acres).

== Faux palaces ==
While many buildings carry the title of palace, there are some which are either no longer, or were not supposed to be, used as a royal residence initially. They served either a sovereign's residence or an episcopal residence, still are counted within the category of Palatial buildings.

Romania's Palace of the Parliament contains 365,000 square metres (3,928,827 sq ft) of floorspace, it was never a royal residence, as Romania's last monarch was forced to abdicate in 1947, but it was the palace intended to be used by president Nicolae Ceausescu, Romania's supreme ruler and dictator.

Britain's Palace of Westminster was built in the Middle Ages as a royal residence. It served as the principal residence of the monarch until 1522, when Henry VIII moved his court to the newly acquired Palace of Whitehall. Since that time, the palace at Westminster has been used by the House of Lords, the House of Commons and various courts. The majority of the medieval palace was destroyed by fire in 1834, with construction of the current building starting in 1840. The palace which now stands on the site was designed specifically for parliamentary use, however it is the property of the monarch in right of the Crown and retains its status as a royal residence. Very little of the medieval palace survived, but the most significant is Westminster Hall, built in 1097 during the reign of William II.

== Converted palaces ==
Several palaces are former royal residences that reached their current grand sizes after they ceased being used as royal residences, and were converted to some other purpose.

The best example of such subsequent expansion is the Louvre Palace. As a royal residence, it was much smaller than the current Louvre Museum. The Louvre Palace was abandoned as a royal residence in 1682, when Louis XIV moved his court to the Palace of Versailles. The Louvre Palace was relegated to the role of displaying royal collections and hosting administrative services, and over the centuries, it went through several renovations, expansions and additions, including a significant one as an imperial project during the Second French Empire in the 19th century. It reached its current size of 210,000 square metres (2,260,000 sq ft) only in 1988, as the modern Louvre Museum.

Russia's Winter Palace and its annexes were not expanded after the Russian Revolution, but the State Hermitage Museum also occupies other buildings, which add to the size of the museum but not to the palace. The Winter Palace contained 2,511,705 square feet (233,345 m^{2}) of floorspace as a royal residence. However, the modern Hermitage Museum complex, centered on the Winter Palace, contains 1,978,622 square feet (183,820 m^{2}) of floorspace. That includes the Small and the Old Hermitage buildings that were annexes to the main palace, which were used by the Imperial Court and are part of the palace complex. The same is true of the New Hermitage, which has been used as a museum for the Imperial collections ever since it was built. All three Hermitages and the Hermitage Theatre can thus be considered both independent buildings and wings of the Winter Palace.

Despite a size that overshadows most other great palaces in Europe, the Winter Palace does not contain as much floorspace since most of the state apartments in the northern and the eastern wings are two floors high.

== Uninhabited palaces ==
With 1,453,122 square feet (134,999 m^{2}) of floorspace, the Royal Palace of Madrid is often considered the largest functioning palace in Europe, as it is still used for state functions. Although Spanish monarchs once occupied it, the current King of Spain does not, instead living at the much smaller Palace of Zarzuela.

Although notably smaller than several other palaces throughout the world, with only 658,858 square feet (61,210 m^{2}) of floorspace, the Royal Palace of Stockholm also claims to be "the largest palace in the world still used for its original purpose." Yet, like the Royal Palace of Madrid, it is not currently occupied, with Swedish monarchs instead occupying Drottningholm Palace.

== Guinness World Record ==
While numerous claimants under the various measurements can be recognized, to be considered for the Guinness World Record the palace must have once been intended for use as a royal residence. This is controversial as the definition of a palace is the official residence of a sovereign, chief of state (as a monarch or a president), archbishop, bishop. Furthermore, only the combined area of all floors in the palace (a measurement commonly known as floorspace) is considered.

According to the Guinness World Records, Forbidden City holds the "largest palace in the world". The Istana Nurul Iman, with 2,152,782 square feet (200,000 m^{2}) of floorspace, holds the title as the "world's largest residential palace" held in Brunei.

== Largest former palace complexes ==
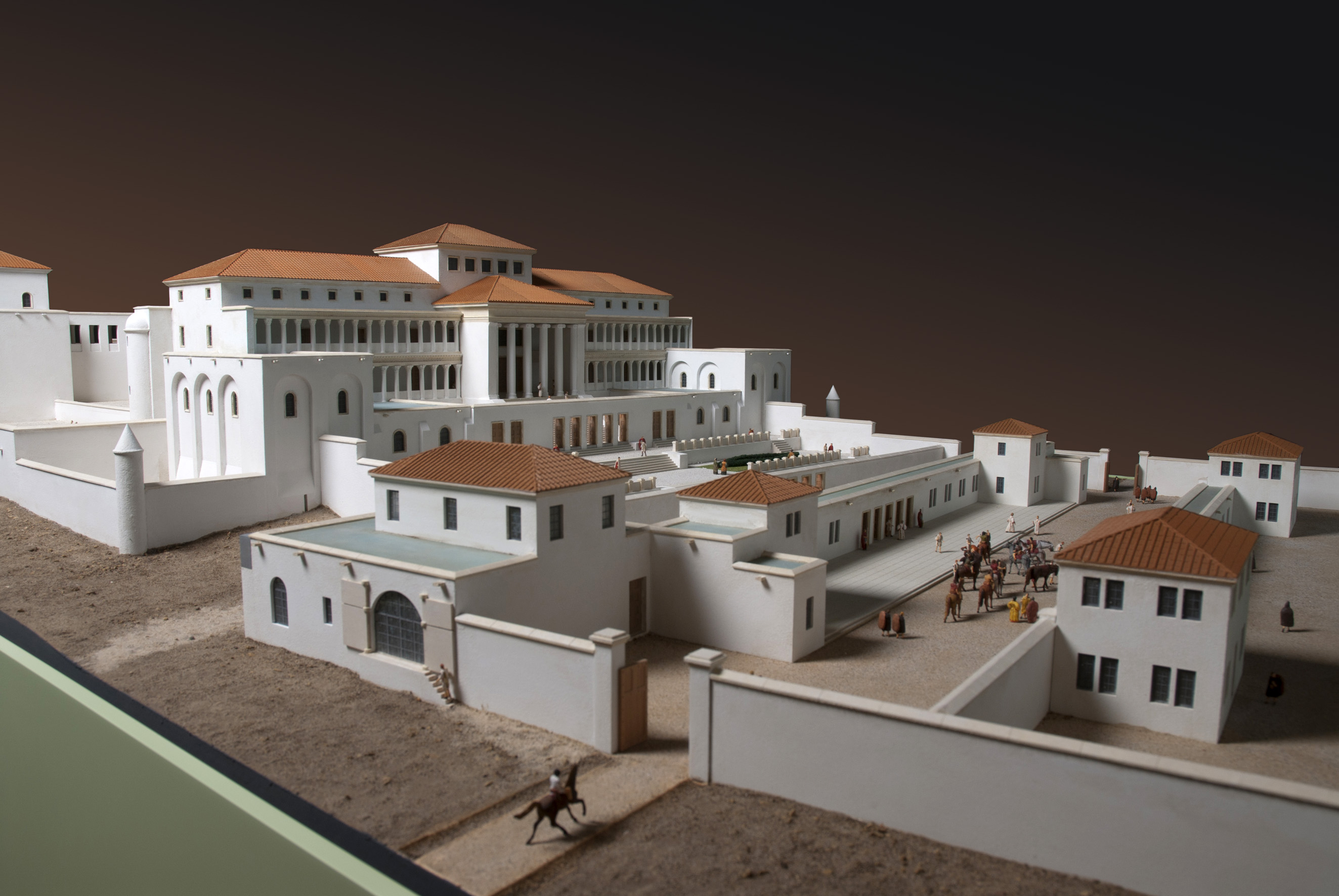
Roman villa in Neuchâtel, Switzerland

In ancient times palace buildings could be as large or even larger than existing palace buildings. One example is the palace of Knossos on the Greek island of Crete. The palace, which started construction in 2000 BC, reached its largest size in 1500 BC with a size of 20,000 m^{2} (215,278.208 ft^{2}) and 1,300 rooms.

The Malkata palace complex was built by the Pharaoh Amenhotep III in the 14th century BC. The size of the palace complex is unknown, but it contained a T-shaped artificial lake covering an area of at least 2 km^{2} (3.6 km^{2} according to some estimates). The size of the main palace itself was 30,000 m^{2}.

The Basileia (royal quarter) of Alexandria is estimated to have covered an area of around 200 hectares (2,000,000 m^{2}), though its exact size is uncertain. According to Strabo it took up a fourth or maybe even a third of the entire city. The complex included multiple palaces and royal residences, parks and gardens, the famous library of Alexandria, royal tombs (including the tomb of Alexander the Great), temples, a theatre, a gymnasium, a zoo, a citadel, a prison, the royal treasury and guest apartments.

The Roman emperor Hadrian's Villa at Tivoli, Italy was a complex of over 30 buildings constructed between 118 and the 130s AD, covering an area of at least 250 acres (1,000,000 square metres (11,000,000 ft^{2})) of which much is still unexcavated. The villa was the greatest Roman example of an Alexandrian garden, recreating a sacred landscape. The complex included palaces, several thermae, theatre, temples, libraries, state rooms, and quarters for courtiers, praetorians, and slaves.

When Roman emperor Nero's "Golden House" (Domus Aurea) was built after the great fire of AD 64, the buildings covered up to 300 acres (1,214,056 square metres (13,067,990 ft^{2})). The main villa of the complex had more than 300 rooms.

In 200 BC, the Weiyang Palace was built at the request of the Emperor Gaozu of Han, under the supervision of his prime minister, Xiao He. The palace survived until the Tang dynasty, when it was burnt down by marauding invaders en route to the Tang capital, Chang'an. It was the largest palace complex ever built on Earth, covering 4.8 square kilometres (1.9 sq mi), which is 6.7 times the size of the current Forbidden City, or 11 times the size of the Vatican City.

The Daming Palace was the imperial palace complex of the Tang dynasty in Chang'an. It served as the imperial residence of the Tang emperors for more than 220 years. In 634, the Emperor Taizong of Tang launched the construction of the Daming Palace at Longshou Plateau. He ordered the construction of the summer palace for his retired father, the Emperor Gaozu of Tang, as an act of filial piety. However, the Emperor Gaozu grew ill and never witnessed the palace's completion before his death in 635, and construction halted thereafter. Wu Zetian commissioned the court architect Yan Liben to design the palace in 660, and construction commenced once again in 662. In 663, the construction of the palace was completed under the reign of the Emperor Gaozong of Tang. The Emperor Gaozong had launched the extension of the palace with the construction of the Hanyuan Hall in 662, which was finished in 663. On 5 June 663, the Tang imperial family began to relocate from the Taiji Palace into the yet to be completed Daming Palace, which became the new seat of the imperial court and political center of the empire. The area of the palace complex was 3.11 km^{2}.

In the Islamic world the largest palaces were those built in Abbasid Samarra. Al-Mu'tasim built the 125 ha (309 acres) Dar al-Khilafa in 836, as the main palace complex and residence of the Caliphs, serving this function until its abandonment in 892. Within the complex are two main palaces the Dar al-'Amma and the al-Jawsaq. The former was the public palace in which the Caliph sat in audience on Mondays and Thursdays, where al-Musta'in was given allegiance and al-Muhtadi held the Mazalim court. Its main (Bab al-'Amma) was the place of public punishments like the crucifixion of al-Afshin or public display Salih b. Wasif's head. As for the al-Jawsaq then this was the private residence of the Caliphs and their families, from al-Mutasim through to al-Mutamid, with many of them being buried here also. It served as a prison for distinguished prisoners such as al-Afshin or al-Musta'in's brothers. But by 903 when al-Muktafi decided to re-establish the capital at Samarra, al-Jawsaq was a ruin.

Caliph al-Mutawakkil sought to outdo his predecessors and was a prolific builder, spending some 13,525,000 dinars (276,045,250 dirhams) in total and doubling the size of the city. After returning from Damascus in October 858 he set about founding a new city, al-Mutawakkiliyya, stating: "Now I know that I am a king, for I have built myself a city in which to live". Part of this was the al-Ja'fari Palace covering a staggering 211 ha (521 acres), making it the largest palace ever built outside of China. He moved in on the Day of Ashura 246 (6 April 860) and numerous poets praised its exquisite beauty. But only a year and a half later, on 11 December 861 it served as the place of his assassination at the hands of his Turkish guard and start of the Anarchy at Samarra. His son al-Muntasir abandoned the palace and moved back to Dar al-Khilafa, causing it to fall into ruin

== List of world's largest palaces ==
	Name	Country	Place	Floor area	Notes	Source	Image
01	Hofburg Palace	Austria	Vienna	300,407 m^{2} (3,234,000 sq ft)	Former imperial palace in the centre of Vienna. Part of the palace forms the official residence and workplace of the President of Austria. Built in the 13th century and expanded in the centuries since, the palace has housed some of the most powerful people in European and Austrian history, including monarchs of the Habsburg dynasty, rulers of the Austro-Hungarian Empire. It was the principal imperial winter residence. The palace has 2600 rooms.		Hofburg Palace
02	Louvre Palace	France	Paris	244,000 m^{2} (2,626,000 sq ft)	Royal residence of the kings of France for 300 years. Later converted into an art museum.		Louvre Palace
03	Winter Palace	Russia	Saint Petersburg	233,345 m^{2} (2,511,705 sq ft)	Used as the official residence and imperial palace of the Emperor of Russia between 1732 and 1917. Briefly served as the seat of the Provisional Government. Currently part of Hermitage Museum.		The Winter Palace
04	Istana Nurul Iman	Brunei	Bandar Seri Begawan	200,000 m^{2} (2,153,000 sq ft)	Official residence of the Sultan of Brunei. The largest functioning royal palace in the world.		Istana Nurul Iman Palace
05	Apostolic Palace	Vatican City	Vatican City	162,000 m^{2} (1,744,000 sq ft)	Official residence of the Pope. Current Papal Palace and Vatican Museums in Rome.		Apostolic Palace
06	Forbidden City	China	Beijing	150,000 m^{2} (1,615,000 sq ft)	With an enclosed area of its around 980 buildings it comprises land area of 150,000 m^{2} (1,615,000 sq ft), while the entire complex has 720,000 square metres (180 acres), it is the world's largest palace complex. Originally the official residence of the Emperor of China. Currently operates the Palace Museum.		Forbidden City
07	Malbork Castle	Poland	Malbork	143,000 m^{2} (1,539,000 sq ft)	The castle was founded in 1274 by the Teutonic Knights who used it as their headquarters to help defeat Polish enemies and rule their own northern Baltic territories. The castle was expanded several times to host the growing number of Knights until their retreat to Königsberg in 1466.		Malbork Castle
08	Royal Palace of Madrid	Spain	Madrid	135,000 m^{2} (1,453,000 sq ft)	The largest functioning royal palace in Europe. Serves as the official residence of the Spanish royal family.		Royal Palace of Madrid
09	Qasr Al Watan	United Arab Emirates	Abu Dhabi	134,275 m^{2} (1,445,324 sq ft)	The presidential palace of Abu Dhabi is used as primary governmental facility and receiving visiting dignitaries. The Palace is utilised to house the offices of the President, the Vice President, the Crown Prince, and the ministers. The western wing has halls which are used for meetings of the UAE Cabinet and Federal Supreme Council. The eastern wing has the "House of Knowledge" where a number of artefacts and other objects of importance are stored.		Qasr Al Watan
10	Royal Palace of Caserta	Italy	Caserta	130,000 m^{2} (1,399,000 sq ft)	The Royal Palace of Caserta is a former royal residence in Caserta, southern Italy, commissioned by Charles of Bourbon as one of the main residences of the Bourbon kings of Naples. The palace has a rectangular plan measuring about 247 × 184 m. Its four sides are connected by two orthogonal arms, dividing the complex into four inner courtyards. The palace covers a ground footprint of about 47,000 m^{2} including the courtyards; excluding the courtyards, the built footprint is about 31,800 m^{2}. Its total area is about 130,000 m^{2}, distributed across five above-ground floors and two semi-basement levels.		Royal Palace of Caserta
11	Jai Villas Palace	India	Gwalior	115,000 m^{2} (1,238,000 sq ft)	The Jai Vilas Palace is a nineteenth-century palace in Gwalior, India. It was built in 1874 by Jayajirao Scindia, the Maharaja of Gwalior. The primary attraction of the palace is the Durbar Hall, which alone uses 560 kg of gold for decorations and houses two of the world's largest chandeliers, weighing 3.50 tons each. The palace still serves as the primary residence of the erstwhile royal family of Gwalior State, the Scindia family.		The Jai Villas Palace
12	Quirinal Palace	Italy	Rome	110,000 m^{2} (1,184,000 sq ft)	Former papal and royal palace and current presidential palace of the President of the Italian Republic. Originally intended to be the official residence of Napoleon Bonaparte. The presidential residence also has a garden with an area of 430,556 square feet (40,000.0 m^{2}).		Quirinal Palace in Rome
13	Abdeen Palace	Egypt	Cairo	108,000 m^{2} (1,163,000 sq ft)	The construction of the palace begin in 1863 and it was officially opened in 1874. In 1921 Sultan Fuad I added the gardens. The total size of the palace complex is 192,000 square metres (2,070,000 sq ft). Serves as the official workplace of the President of Egypt.		Abdeen Palace
14	Umaid Bhawan Palace	India	Jodhpur	105,000 m^{2} (1,130,000 sq ft)	The Umaid Bhawan Palace in Jodhpur, Rajasthan, India, is one of the world's largest private residences. It is named after Maharaja Umaid Singh, grandfather of the present owner, Gaj Singh. The palace compound & estate is spread over 26 acres of land, including the 15 acres of garden space. The palace has 347 rooms and is the principal residence of the former Jodhpur royal family.		The Umaid Bhavan Palace, Jodhpur, Rajasthan, India
15	Falaknuma Palace	India	Hyderabad	93,971 m^{2} (1,011,495 sq ft)	Built in the year 1889 in Hyderabad, India it was owned by the Nizams, the rulers of the princely state of Hyderabad, until 1950. Currently operated as a luxury hotel by Taj Hotels.		Falaknuma Palace
16	Istana Negara	Malaysia	Kuala Lumpur	90,082 m^{2} (969,635 sq ft)	Istana Negara is the official residence of the Yang di-Pertuan Agong, the monarch of Malaysia. It is located along Jalan Tuanku Abdul Halim in Segambut, northwestern Kuala Lumpur. The palace opened in 2011 and replaced the old Istana Negara which was located at a different compound in central Kuala Lumpur. The palace complex has an area of 97.65 hectares, 22 domes, and is split into three main portions: the Formal Component, Royal Component and Administration Component.		Istana Negara
17	Binnenhof	Netherlands	The Hague	90,000 m^{2} (969,000 sq ft)	Built primarily in the 13th century, the castle originally functioned as residence of the counts of Holland and became the political centre of the Dutch Republic in 1584.		Binnenhof
18	Mysore Palace	India	Mysore	80,000 m^{2} (861,000 sq ft)	Mysore Palace, also known as Amba Vilas Palace, is a historical palace and a royal residence. It is located in Mysore, Karnataka, India. It used to be the official residence of the Wadiyar dynasty and the seat of the Kingdom of Mysore. The entire palace consists of the primary building, 12 major temples, administrative offices, and separate residential wings within the palace, adding the total floor area to 80,000 square metres.		Lighting of Mysore Palace during Mysore Dasara (2012)
19	Buckingham Palace	United Kingdom	London	77,000 m^{2} (829,000 sq ft)	A royal residence since George III bought Buckingham House in 1761 for his wife Queen Charlotte and has been the official London residence of the British sovereign since Queen Victoria took up residence in July 1837. The palace contains 775 rooms and has a garden 40 acres (16 ha) in size.		Buckingham Palace
20	Çırağan Palace	Turkey	Istanbul	76,000 m^{2} (818,000 sq ft)	The palace, built by Sultan Abdulaziz, was designed by the Armenian palace architect Nigoğayos Balyan and constructed by his sons Sarkis and Hagop Balyan between 1863 and 1867, during a period in which all Ottoman sultans built their own palaces rather than using those of their ancestors; Çırağan Palace is the last example of this tradition.		Çırağan Palace
21	Prague Castle	Czech Republic	Prague	70,000 m^{2} (753,000 sq ft)	Seat of power for kings of Bohemia, Holy Roman emperors, presidents of Czechoslovakia and currently presidents of the Czech Republic. Dating back to the ninth century and at about 570 metres (1,870 ft) in length and an average of about 130 metres (430 ft) wide, the Guinness Book of Records lists Prague Castle as the largest ancient castle in the world.		Prague Castle
22	Topkapi Palace	Turkey	Istanbul	70,000 m^{2} (753,000 sq ft)	Primary residence of the Ottoman Dynasty for approximately 400 years between the Ottoman conquest of Constantinople and the dissolution of the Ottoman Empire. The entire palace complex including grounds occupies 700,000 square metres (7,500,000 sq ft).		Topkapi Palace
23	Mukden Palace	China	Shenyang	63,272 m^{2} (681,054 sq ft)	This was the former imperial palace of the early Manchu-led Qing dynasty. It was built in 1625, and the first three Qing emperors lived there from 1625 to 1644. Since the collapse of imperial rule in China, the palace has been converted to a museum that now lies in the center of Shenyang, Liaoning.		Mukden Palace
24	Palace of Versailles	France	Versailles	63,154 m^{2} (679,784 sq ft)	World's largest royal domain with 87,728,720 square feet (8,150,265 m^{2}) or 2,014 acres of palace grounds. Constructed by King Louis XIV and used as the official seat of the King of France. Was the site of the ratification of the Treaty of Paris, the Proclamation of the German Empire, and the signing of the Treaty of Versailles. Currently used by the Congress of the French Parliament.		Palace of Versailles
25	Royal Palace of Stockholm	Sweden	Stockholm	61,210 m^{2} (658,859 sq ft)	Claims to be world's largest palace still used for its original purpose, despite its smaller floor area. Used as the official residence of the Swedish sovereign.		Royal Palace of Stockholm
26	Prince Gong's Mansion	China	Beijing	61,120 m^{2} (657,890 sq ft)	it was constructed in 1777 during the Qing dynasty for Heshen, a prominent court official in the reign of the Qianlong Emperor infamous for being the most corrupt official in Chinese history.		Prince Gong's Mansion
27	Mannheim Palace	Germany	Mannheim	60,000 m^{2} (646,000 sq ft)	Mannheimer Residenz is the main palace of the Prince-electors of the Electorate of the Palatinate of the House of Wittelsbach. The 6 ha (60,000 m^{2}) castle is one of Europe's largest palaces and the second largest baroque palace (after Versailles).		Mannheim Palace
28	Wawel Castle	Poland	Kraków	56,973 m^{2} (613,252 sq ft)	The Wawel Royal Castle and the Wawel Hill on which it sits constitute the most historically and culturally significant site in Poland. A fortified residency on the Vistula River in Kraków, it was established on the orders of King Casimir III the Great and enlarged over the centuries into a number of structures around a Polish Renaissance courtyard.		Wawel Castle
29	Burghausen Castle	Germany	Burghausen	56,810 m^{2} (611,498 sq ft)	Burghausen Castle is the longest and third largest castle complex in the world (1051 m), confirmed by the Guinness World Record company.		Burghausen Castle
30	Windsor Castle	United Kingdom	Windsor	54,835 m^{2} (590,239 sq ft)	Castle which dates back to around 1070 and has 5455 acres of royal parkland. Many famous people associated with British Royalty are buried in St Georges Chapel at Windsor Castle including Henry VIII. It is also the World's largest and oldest inhabited castle.		Windsor Castle
31	Christiansborg Palace	Denmark	Copenhagen	51,660 m^{2} (556,064 sq ft)	The seat of the Danish Parliament, the Prime Minister's Office and the Supreme Court. Also, several parts of the palace are used by the monarchy, including the Royal Reception Rooms, the Palace Chapel and the Royal Stables. Christiansborg Palace has a more than 800 year-long history as the state's centre of power as royal palace and parliament.		Christiansborg Palace
32	Hampton Court Palace	United Kingdom	Richmond upon Thames	47,330 m^{2} (509,456 sq ft)	Palace dating back to 1515 containing 1000 rooms and grounds comprising 60 acres of formal gardens and 750 acres of royal parkland.		Hampton Court
33	Palace of Fontainebleau	France	Fontainebleau	46,500 m^{2} (501,000 sq ft)	Castle dating back to 1137, continuously used by French monarchs up until 1870. It contains more than 1500 rooms, also houses the museum Napoleon I.		Palace of Fontainebleau
34	Berlin Palace	Germany	Berlin	45,000 m^{2} (484,000 sq ft)	The former residence of the Hohenzollern dynasty, the rulers of the Kingdom of Prussia, and later the German Empire, was severely damaged in World War II. The significant remaining ruins were not stabilized, and it was completely demolished in 1950 and 1951 by East Germany. In its place, the German Democratic Republic built the Palace of the Republic, which was demolished between 2006 and 2008, and the former Berlin Palace was reconstructed as the Humboldt Forum, a large museum, between 2013 and 2021.		Berlin Palace
35	Gyeongbokgung Palace	South Korea	Seoul	45,000 m^{2} (484,000 sq ft)	This palace was the main home of the Joseon Royal Family, and although it burned several times throughout history, it is getting rebuilt now. The total number of buildings was around 735 at one point in the 19th century, yet not all survived; still as of now 276 are scheduled to be restored from 2010. The palace includes government offices and other facilities. These buildings cover an area of 42,000 to 45,000m^{2}(484,375.96 sq feet), yet the total complex would cover 415,000 m^{2} (4,150,000 sq ft), hence making it second to forbidden city, if the total complex area is accounted. It also includes the National Palace Museum of Korea.		
36	Dolmabahçe Palace	Turkey	Istanbul	45,000 m^{2} (484,000 sq ft)	Located in the Beşiktaş district of Istanbul, Turkey, on the European coast of the Strait of Istanbul, served as the main administrative center of the Ottoman Empire from 1856 to 1887 and from 1909 to 1922.		A view of the palace from the Bosporus
37	Buda Castle	Hungary	Budapest	44,674 m^{2} (480,867 sq ft)	First completed in 1265, although the massive Baroque palace today occupying most of the site was built between 1749 and 1769. The complex in the past was referred to as the Royal Palace (Hungarian: Királyi-palota), with Hungarian & Habsburg Kings Residing in the residence. The castle now houses the Hungarian National Gallery and The Budapest History Museum.		
38	Książ Castle	Poland	Wałbrzych	42,840 m^{2} (461,126 sq ft)	The largest castle in the region of Silesia, it is the third-largest in Poland behind Malbork Castle and Wawel Castle.		Książ Castle
39	Grand Serail	Lebanon	Beirut	39,970 m^{2} (430,233 sq ft)	Headquarters of the Prime Minister of Lebanon. Previously served as an Ottoman Army garrison, the headquarters of the French Governor of Syria and Lebanon, and the President of Lebanon's residence.		Hamidiyyeh Clock Tower
40	Mafra National Palace	Portugal	Mafra	39,948 m^{2} (429,997 sq ft)	The Mafra National Palace is a monumental Baroque and Italianized Neoclassical palace-monastery located in Mafra, Portugal.		
41	Het Loo Palace	Netherlands	Apeldoorn	36,042 m^{2} (387,953 sq ft)	Is a Dutch Baroque Palace built between 1684 and 1686 for stadtholder-king William III and Mary II of England.		
42	Royal Palace of Brussels	Belgium	Brussels	33,027 m^{2} (355,500 sq ft)	Palace in Brussels dating back to 1783. The Royal Palace of Brussels is the official palace of the Sovereign of Belgium, However it is not used as a royal residence, as the king and his family live in the Royal Castle of Laeken on the outskirts of Brussels.		Bruxels April 2012-4
43	Palazzo Pitti	Italy	Florence	32,000 m^{2} (344,000 sq ft)	Renaissance, palace, the core of the present palazzo dates from 1458. The palace was bought by the Medici family in 1549 and became the chief residence of the ruling families of the Grand Duchy of Tuscany. In the late 18th century, the palazzo was used as a power base by Napoleon, and later served for a brief period as the principal royal palace of the newly united Italy. The complex also includes the Boboli Gardens (320,000 square metres (3,400,000 sq ft)).		Palazzo Pitti
44	Frederiksborg Palace	Denmark	Hillerød	31,290 m^{2} (336,803 sq ft)	It was built as a royal residence for King Christian IV and is now a museum of national history. The current edifice replaced a previous castle erected by Frederick II and is the largest Renaissance palace in Scandinavia. The entire palace complex including grounds occupies 95 hectares (950,000 m^{2}).		Frederiksborg Palace
45	Schönbrunn Palace	Austria	Vienna	31,056 m^{2} (334,284 sq ft)	Baroque Palace dating back to the 1740s. The grounds of Schönbrunn, a World Heritage Site, cover 160 hectares. Served as the summer palace of the Habsburg monarchs.		Schönbrunn, Viedeň, Rakúsko
46	Mufu Mansion	China	Lijiang	30,667 m^{2} (330,097 sq ft)	Mufu Palace or Mufu Mansion is located on the foot of Lion Mountain, The top ruler of Naxi minority Mu Family had been living in this palace since Yuan Dynasty to Qing Dynasty, totally 470 years with 22 generation rulers.		Mufu Palace
47	Kronborg	Denmark	Helsingør	28,724 m^{2} (309,183 sq ft)	Immortalized as Elsinore in William Shakespeare's play Hamlet, Kronborg is one of the most important Renaissance castles in Northern Europe and has been added to UNESCO's World Heritage Sites list (2000).		Kronborg
48	El Escorial	Spain	San Lorenzo de El Escorial	30,658 m^{2} (330,000 sq ft)	Monastery of the Order of Saint Augustine, Royal Palace and Royal Pantheon.		The monastery of El Escorial
49	Lakshmi Vilas Palace,	India	Vadodara	30,800 m^{2} (332,000 sq ft)	The vadodra palace or Lakshmi Vilas Palace is situated in Vadodara, Gujarat, India, was constructed in 1890 by architect Charles Mant for the House of Gaekwad, which was a prominent Maratha nobility ruling over the State of Baroda, it costed £180,000 GBP, which is equivalent to £55–£95 million GBP today. Still despite building's grand floor area only being 30,800 m^{2} (332,000 sq ft), the entire palatial complex, when adding the estate covers an area, totaling up to 700 acres (280 ha), making it four times bigger than Buckingham Palace, by itself being the biggest palatial estate owned privately and the third biggest palatial complex in the world, when compared with the forbidden city & Gyeongbokgung Palace.	|	The Lakshmi Villas Palace, Vadodara, India
50	Amalienborg	Denmark	Copenhagen	26,500 m^{2} (285,000 sq ft)	Official residence of the Danish Monarch in Copenhagen, It consists of four identical classical palace façades with rococo interiors around an octagonal courtyard, in the centre of the square is a monumental equestrian statue of Amalienborg's founder, King Frederick V.		Amalienborg Palace
51	Yıldız Palace	Turkey	Istanbul	25,000 m^{2} (269,000 sq ft)	Yıldız Palace, meaning "Star Palace", was built in 1880 and was used by the Ottoman Empire Ottoman Sultan Abdülhamid II. The area of the palace was originally made of natural woodlands and became an imperial estate during the reign of Sultan Ahmed I (1603–1617). Various sultans after Ahmed I enjoyed vacationing on these lands and Sultans Abdülmecid I and Abdülaziz built mansions here. The entire complex with various pavilions, kiosks, mosques and park consists 500,000 m2		Yıldız Palace
52	Grand Kremlin Palace	Russia	Moscow	24,100 m^{2} (259,000 sq ft)	It includes the earlier Terem Palace, nine churches from the 14th, 16th, and 17th centuries, the Holy Vestibule, and over 700 rooms.		Grand Kremlin Palace
53	Munich Residenz	Germany	Munich	23,000 m^{2} (248,000 sq ft)	The Residenz, with its 130 rooms and ten courtyards, is the former royal palace of the Wittelsbach monarchs of Bavaria and the largest city palace in Germany. The three main parts are the Königsbau, the Alte Residenz and the Festsaalbau. A wing of the Festsaalbau contains the Cuvilliés Theatre and the Herkulessaal concert hall. Also included in the Residenz is the Byzantine Court Church of All Saints (Allerheiligen-Hofkirche) and the Marstall, the building for the former Court Riding School and the royal stables.		Munich Residenz
54	Royal Palace of Amsterdam	Netherlands	Amsterdam	22,031 m^{2} (237,140 sq ft)	The palace was built as a city hall during the Dutch Golden Age in the 17th century. The building became the royal palace of King Louis Napoleon and later of the Dutch Royal House.		
55	Rambagh Palace, Jaipur	India	Jaipur	21,800 m^{2} (235,000 sq ft)	The Rambagh Palace in Jaipur, Rajasthan is the former residence of the Maharaja of Jaipur located 05 miles (08 km) outside the walls of the city of Jaipur on Bhawani Singh Road.		The Rambagh Palace, Jaipur
56	Jelgava Palace	Latvia	Jelgava	21,000 m^{2} (226,000 sq ft)	The Jelgava palace was being constructed from 1738 to 1772 in Mitau (modern day Jelgava), Latvia with it never being fully completed. It was built for the dukes of Courland but after the annexation of the country by the Russian Empire, it became the residence of the governors of Courland. After being destroyed in World War II its interior was gutted and it became The University of Life Sciences and Technologies. Though attempts are being made in co-operation with Rundāle Palace to restore a few rooms.		
57	Schloss Charlottenburg	Germany	Berlin	20,600 m^{2} (222,000 sq ft)	The former residence of the Hohenzollern dynasty was built at the end of the 17th century and was greatly expanded during the 18th century. Lavish internal decoration in Baroque and Rococo styles show its rich history. A large formal garden surrounds the palace. During the Second World War, the palace was badly damaged but has since been rebuilt. The palace with its gardens is a major tourist attraction in Berlin.		Berlin Palace
58	City Palace, Udaipur	India	Udaipur	18,580 m^{2} (200,000 sq ft)	City Palace (Raj Mahal), Udaipur is a palace complex situated in the city of Udaipur in the Indian state of Rajasthan. It was built over a period of nearly 400 years, with contributions from several rulers of the Mewar dynasty. Its construction began in 1553, started by Maharana Udai Singh II of the Sisodia Rajput family as he shifted his capital from the erstwhile Chittor to the newfound city of Udaipur. The palace is located on the east bank of Lake Pichola and has several palaces built within its complex.		Facade of The City Palace, Udaipur
59	City Palace, Jaipur	India	Jaipur	18,000 m^{2} (194,000 sq ft)	The City Palace, Jaipur is a royal residence and former administrative headquarters of the rulers of the Jaipur State in Jaipur, Rajasthan. Construction started soon after the establishment of the city of Jaipur under the reign of Maharaja Sawai Jai Singh II, who moved his court to Jaipur from Amber, in 1727.		Courtyard of the City Palace, Jaipur
60	Ras El Tin Palace	Egypt	Alexandria	17,000 m^{2} (183,000 sq ft)	Construction began in 1834, taking eleven years to complete the original design in 1845. Complementary work and the construction of additional wings continued for two more years until 1847, when it was officially inaugurated by Muhammed Ali of Egypt.		Ras El Tin Palace
61	Peace Palace	Netherlands	The Hague	15,500 m^{2} (166,841 sq ft)	Ihe palace houses the International Court of Justice (which is the principal judicial body of the United Nations), the Permanent Court of Arbitration (PCA), The Hague Academy of International Law and the Peace Palace Library.		
62	Noordeinde Palace	Netherlands	The Hague	13,700 m^{2} (147,466 sq ft)	The Noordeinde Palace building is located at the palace grounds in the city center of The Hague, which also contains the Royal Stables (Netherlands).		
63	Paço de São Cristóvão	Brazil	Rio de Janeiro	13,616 m^{2} (146,561 sq ft)	It was a royal and imperial palace located in Rio de Janeiro, Brazil. It served as residence to the Portuguese royal family (due to the transfer of the Portuguese court to Brazil) and later to the Brazilian imperial family.		
64	Royal Castle, Warsaw	Poland	Warsaw	10,056 m^{2} (108,242 sq ft)	The Royal Castle in Warsaw is a state museum, which formerly served as the official royal residence of several Polish monarchs. The personal offices of the king and the administrative offices of the royal court were located in the Castle from the 16th century until the final partition of Poland in 1795. The castle was burned and plundered by the Germans in 1939, and then completely destroyed in 1944. It was reconstructed in 1971–1984. The Royal Castle holds a significant collection of Polish and European art.		Royal Castle in Warsaw
65	Soestdijk Palace	Netherlands	Baarn	9,000 m^{2} (97,000 sq ft)	It was the home for over six decades of Queen Juliana and her husband, Prince Bernhard until their deaths in 2004.		
66	Huis ten Bosch	Netherlands	The Hague	8,785 m^{2} (94,561 sq ft)	Huis ten Bosch was the former home of Queen Beatrix from 1981 to her abdication in 2014; King Willem-Alexander and his family moved in on 13 January 2019. A replica of the palace was built in Sasebo, Japan, in a theme park bearing the same name.		
