= Maximilian Liebenwein =

Austrian-German painter and graphic artist

- Maximilian Albert Josef Liebenwein
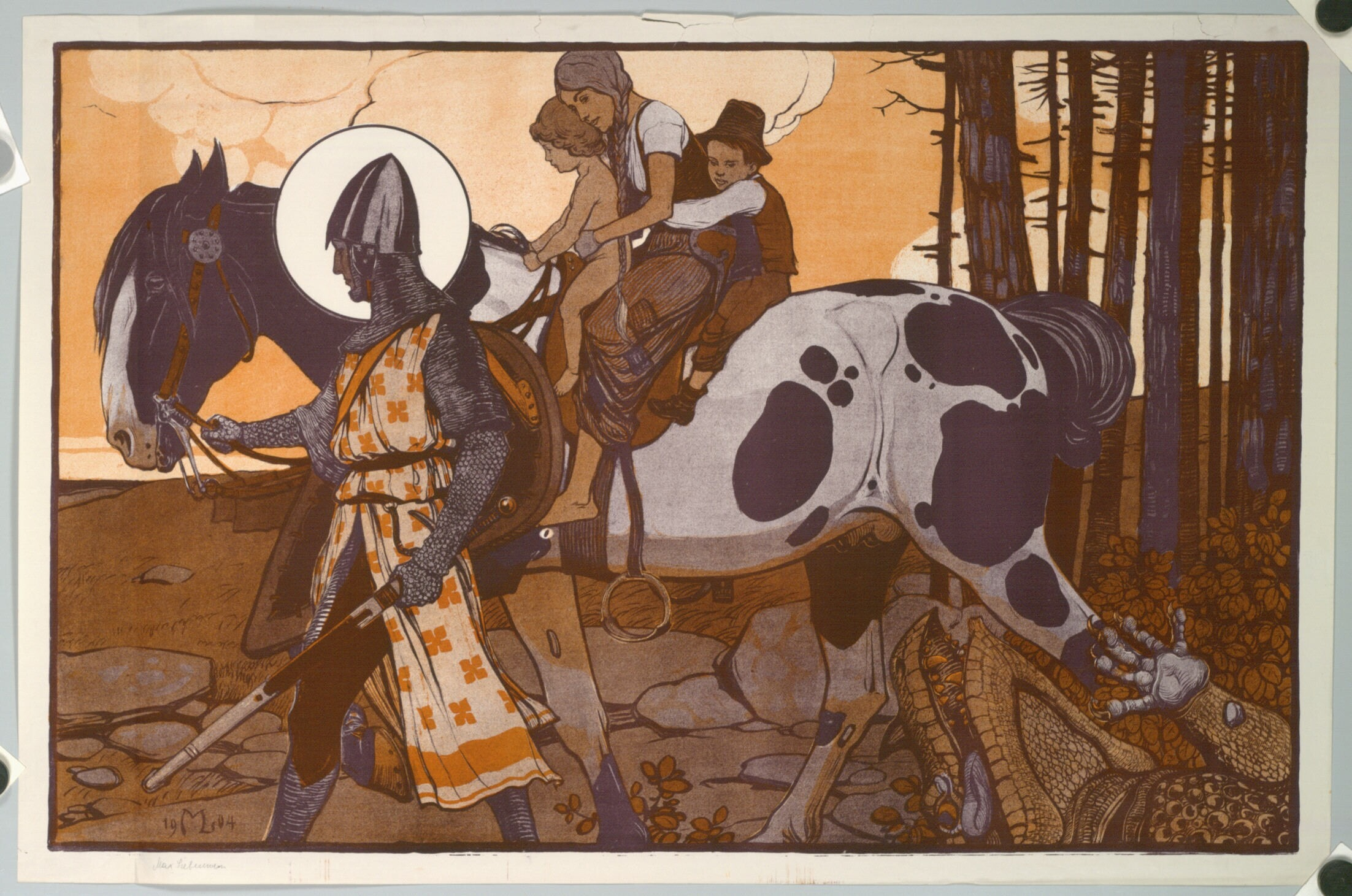
- St George (without writing), 1904
- Born: 11 April 1869; Vienna, Austria-Hungary
- Died: 17 July 1926 (aged 57); Munich, Weimar Republic
- Resting place: Burghausen, Altötting
- Education: Academy of Fine Arts, Vienna; Academy of Fine Arts, Karlsruhe; Academy of Fine Arts, Munich
- Known for: painting; illustration; graphic design
- Movement: Impressionism; Art Nouveau
- Spouse: Anna Essigmann

Maximilian Albert Josef Liebenwein (11 April 1869 – 17 July 1926) was an Austrian-German painter, graphic artist and book illustrator, in the Impressionist and Art Nouveau styles. He spent significant time in Vienna, Munich and Burghausen, Altötting, and took an active part in the artistic community in all three places. He was an important member of the Vienna Secession, becoming its vice-president, and exhibiting with the group many times.

== Life ==
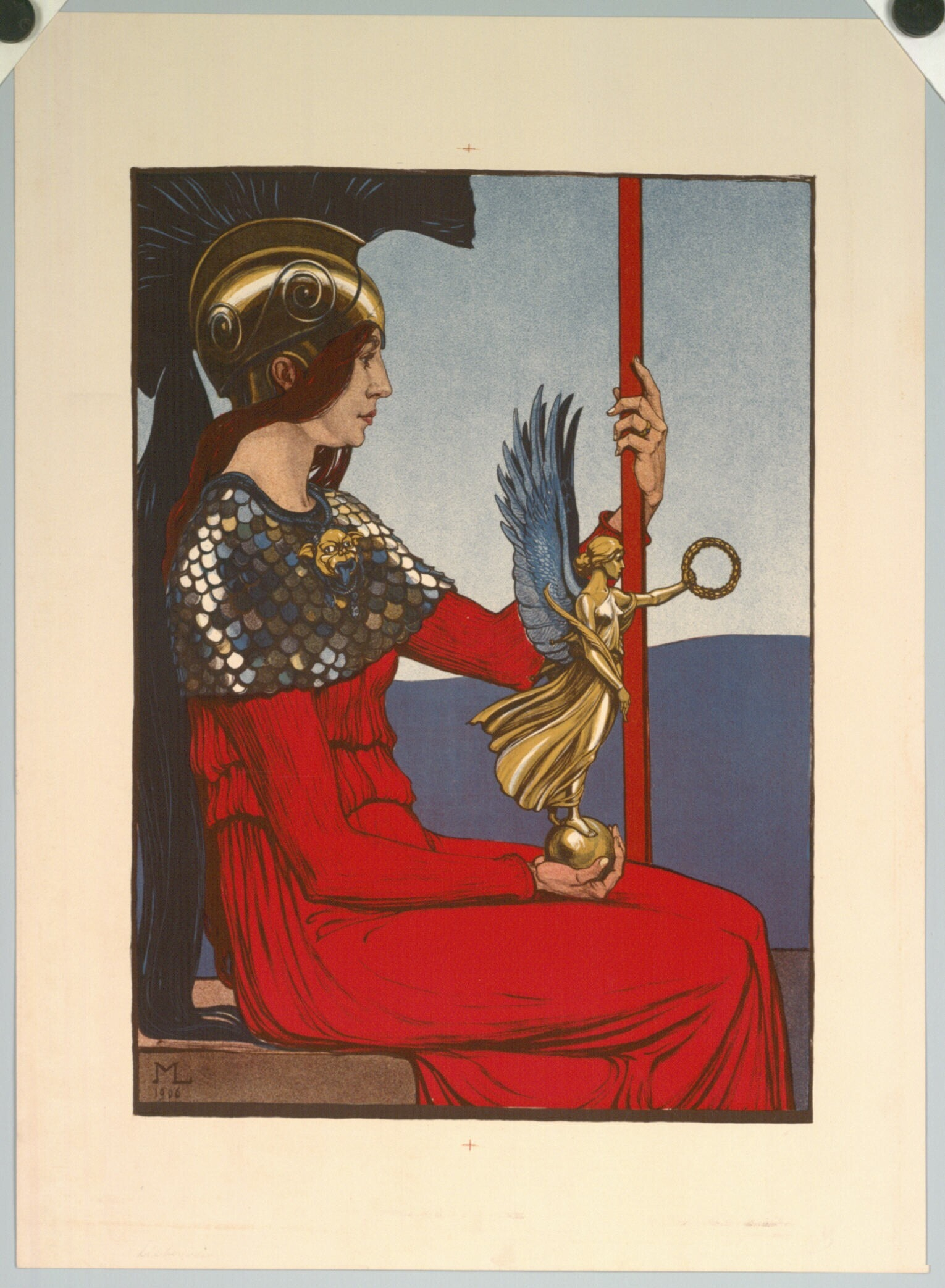
Pallas Athene, 1906

=== Early life, education and training ===
Liebenwein was born in Vienna, the second son of Joseph Calasanz Liebenwein (1835-1906) and Magdalena (née Kundrat). His father was a merchant, running a laundry and selling clothes in Vienna and in Lilienfeld. As a boy, Liebenwein spent time in both cities. His mother was the daughter of Joseph Kundrat, the personal valet of and a huntsman and forester for Emperor Franz Joseph, and his uncle was the pathologist and coroner Hans Kundrat. His grandfather kept a large library and a natural science collection, and helped fuel young Liebenwein's interest in poetry, legends and nature. Liebenwein studied at the Schottengymnasium in Vienna.

Liebenwein's father initially did not support his artistic ambitions, but his uncle helped smooth his path. In 1887 he entered the Academy of Fine Arts, Vienna, but he did not enjoy his studies there; he was keener to study animals at the Tiergarten Schönbrunn and cadavers under his uncle's supervision. Julius Victor Berger, Liebenwein's teacher, showed compassion to him, but he left the Academy in 1891. He spent 1891-92 with the 13th Dragoon Regiment, Prince Eugene of Savoy, then in autumn 1892 attended the Specialschule für Historienmalerei (Special School for Historical Painting) under Matthias von Trenkwald. In 1893, he was appointed lieutenant of Reserve Dragoon Regiment Kaiser Franz I. Liebenwein's father broke his leg and needed help with the family business, and so Liebenwein could not attend classes regularly; this was a point of contention between von Trenkwald and Liebenwein, and he left the Special School in March 1893, spending several months as a "rider and hunter" on the Lilienfeld estate.

In 1894, he followed his friend Ferdinand Andri to Karlsruhe and enrolled at the Academy of Fine Arts, Karlsruhe and attended Caspar Ritter's painting classes. Still unhappy with his environs, he met Heinrich von Zügel in early 1895 and began attending his classes on animal painting. Liebenwein took to Zügel as a teacher, and, with him, moved to Munich in November. Liebenwein spent four semesters at the Academy of Fine Arts, Munich, matriculating on 12 November 1895 and staying there until 1897. His matriculation records list him as a Roman Catholic.

=== Independent painter in Munich and Burghausen ===
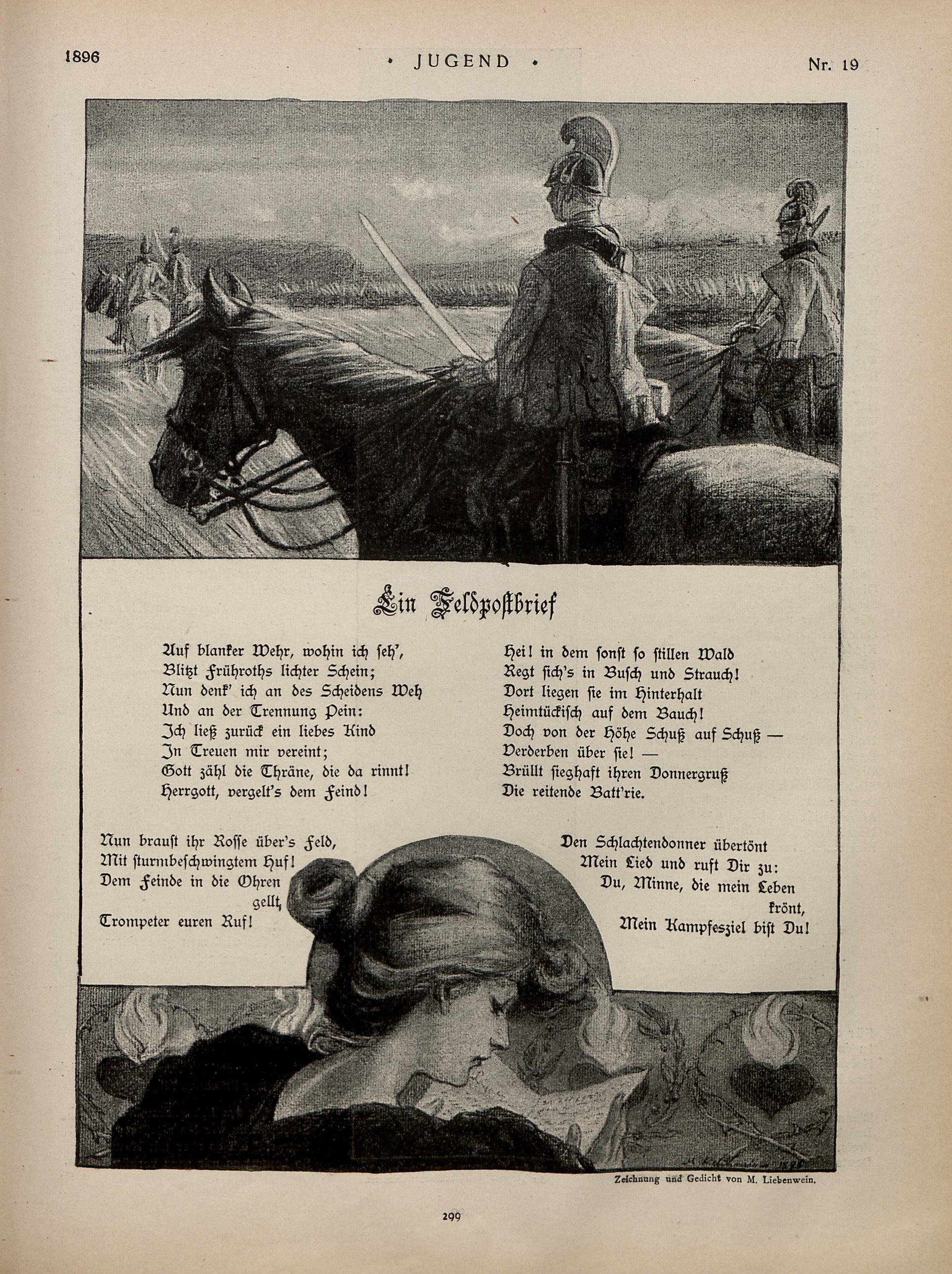
A Field Army Letter, published in Jugend in 1896. Poem and illustrations both by Maximilian Liebenwein.

From 1897, Liebenwein lived as an independent painter in Munich, and also ran painting classes. During a visit with his draftsman/etcher friend Walter Ziegler, they saw Burghausen and the medieval Burghausen Castle. The medieval town of Burghausen and its castle impressed them as an appropriate conceptual setting for the romantic-chivalric themes of many of Liebenwein's works. The location had been suggested by Liebenwein's friend Ignatius Taschner, whom he had met in the Verein Deutscher Kunststudierender. During the summers of 1897 and 1898 Liebenwein stayed at the castle. In 1899, Liebenwein established his residence and studio in the castle's largest tower, which he reworked as a Gesamtkunstwerk (total artwork) together with his friend Paul Horst-Schulze. Within three days in 1899, Horst-Schulze and Liebenwein painted a frieze inside the tower, so that Liebenwein's bride-to-be would see it on her first visit. The artwork covers three sides of a room and reflects medieval themes, including imagery of Walther von der Vogelweide and Parzival.

It was in this period that Liebenwein discovered his affinity for Art Nouveau; in 1896, some of his illustrations had appeared in the Art Nouveau magazine Jugend. He contributed to the Bosnian magazine Nada, from its founding in 1895 until its last issue in 1903. It was an initiative of Béni Kállay. Liebenwein, the magazine's main illustrator Ewald Arndt Čeplin, his brother Leo and its other regular artist Ivana Kobilca formed the obscure 'Sarajevo Painter's Club'. He visited the country in 1900 and 1901.

In 1900, he won a competition held by Ludwig Stollwerck for designs for a trading card album for the Stollwerck company. Other winners included Fritz Helmuth Ehmcke from Berlin; Ernst Neumann, Adolf Höfer and Walter Püttner from Munich; and Karl Hölle from Hamburg. The judges were Emil Doepler, Woldemar Friedrich, Bruno Schmitz and Franz Skarbina from Berlin, in addition to a Stollwerck partner. Liebenwein's theme was Kater Murr.

=== With the Vienna Secession and other groups ===
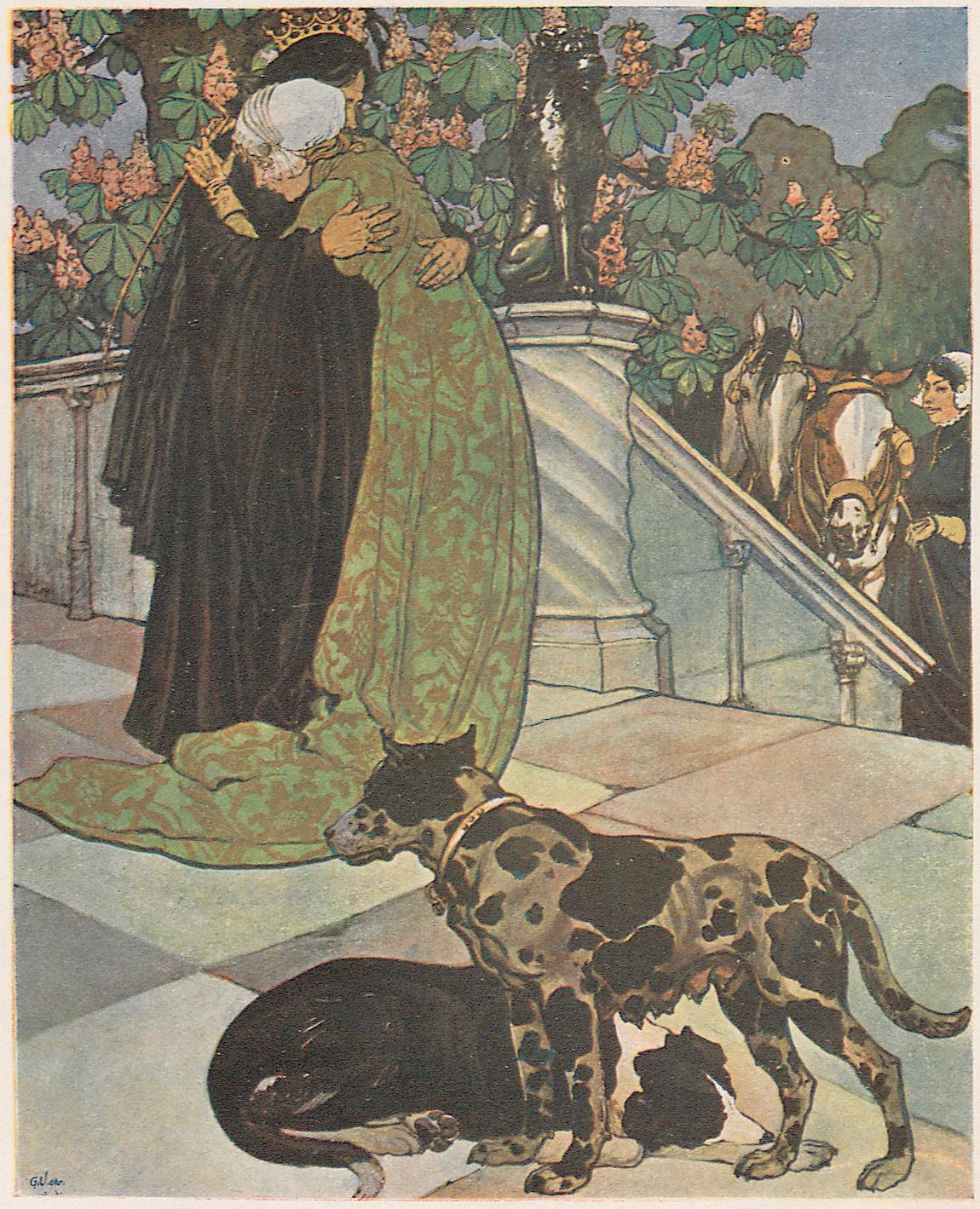
From The Goose Girl, published in Ver Sacrum in 1902

Liebenwein exhibited with the Vienna Secession in spring 1900. His works shown included Percival (1899) and several animal studies. Following the exhibition, he became a full member of the group, and became its vice-president by 1912. He was an active member until his death. Still living in the 'Liebenwein tower' of Burghausen Castle, he married Anna Essigmann (born 1879), from Vienna, in May 1901, with his first son Hans Georg born in 1902 (died 1977). The family were friends with Koloman Moser, who had been on the committee that invited Liebenwein to exhibit with the Vienna Secession. Extracts from his travel diaries from his 1900 trip to Bosnia, together with his own illustrations, were published in Ver Sacrum in 1902. Liebenwein did not follow Gustav Klimt in seceding from the Secession in 1905, even though he was invited to join.

Liebenwein joined the Deutscher Künstlerbund in Weimar in 1904. After his father's death in 1906, he spent some time in Vienna, and in the same year made trips to Brussels and London. He joined the Luitpold group in Munich in 1907; he exhibited in the Glass Palace between 1902 and 1912. During 1907–08, he created the Liebenweinfries (Liebenwein Frieze) in the Linz Savings Bank. In 1909 received the Golden State Medal in Graz for his fairy tale cycle King Thrushbeard (1905/06).

=== Back in Vienna, World War I and afterwards ===
Liebenwein returned to Vienna in 1908-09, and ran a painting school for men and women until 1913, though he still spent summers in Burghausen. In 1910 he adorned a hall of the First International Hunting Exhibition in Vienna with monumental paintings; he was presented to Emperor Franz Joseph I at the exhibition.

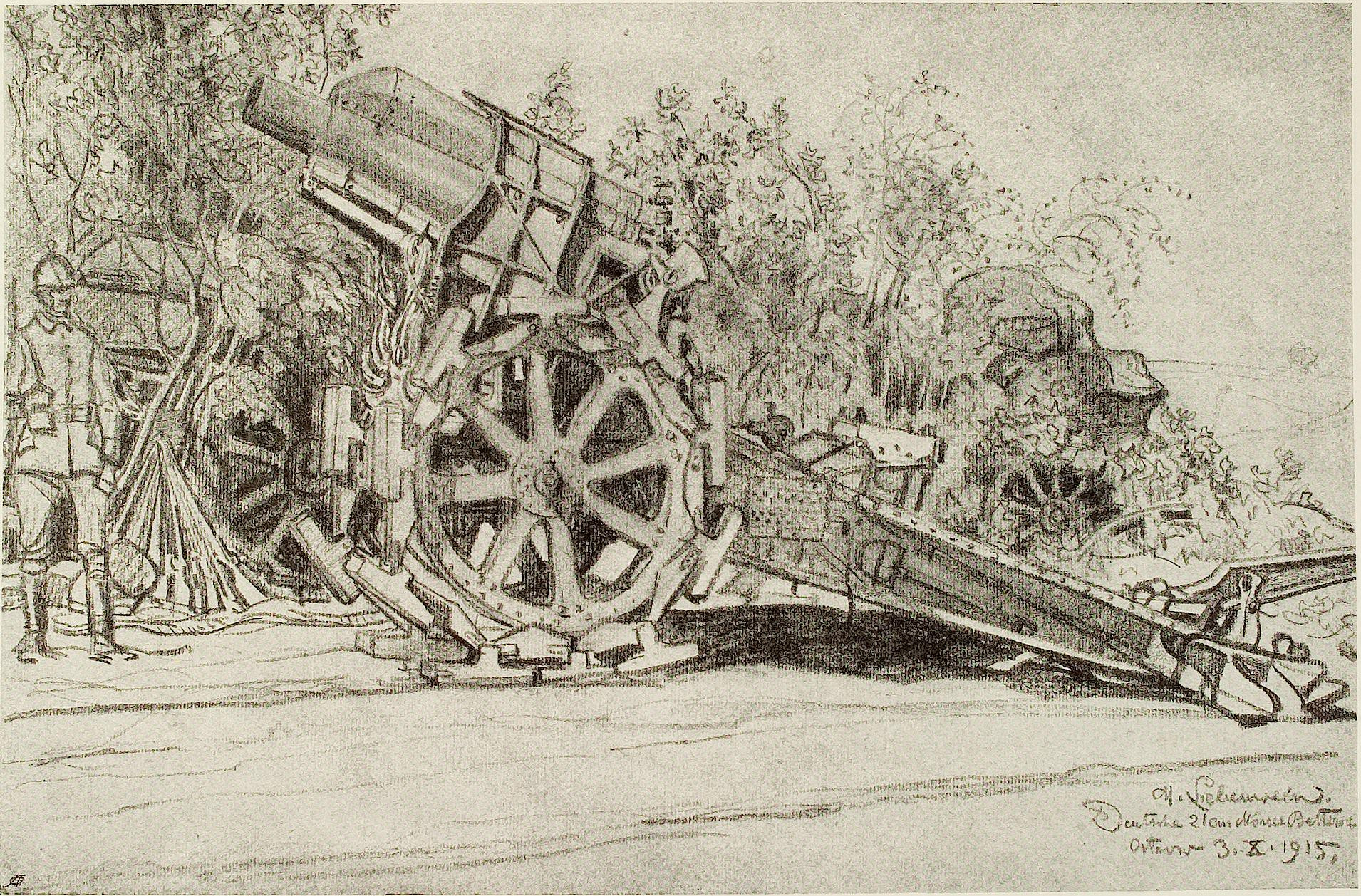
Sketch of a German 21 cm mortar battery, near Ostrow in 1915.

His second son, Wolfgang Ferdinand, was born in 1911. Liebenwein volunteered for military service in 1914 and he was called up in June 1915; his wife Anna died from breast cancer in that year, in a sanatorium in Gmunden, while he was at the eastern front. Liebenwein served as an ordnance officer for XVII Corps. He was with the army in Poland, Russia, Isonzo and Bukovina, and produced many drawings in 54 sketchbooks. He suffered a stroke in December 1917, and left the army in December 1918.

Post-war Vienna did not offer many opportunities for artists, and Liebenwein moved back to Burghausen. In 1919–1925, he created a long cycle depicting the life of the Virgin Mary in the convent of the Franciscan Sisters of Vöcklabruck. In 1923, he was a founding member of the Innviertler Artists Guild. In 1924, Liebenwein received the Silver Medal of the city of Salzburg for the paintings "Und wenn die Welt voll Teufel wär..." (1908), "Christ and the Adulteress" (1914) and "Rider Troop in Ambush" (lost).

In February 1926, Liebenwein suffered another stroke in Burghausen, and died in July 1926 in Munich. He was buried in Burghausen.

== Style ==
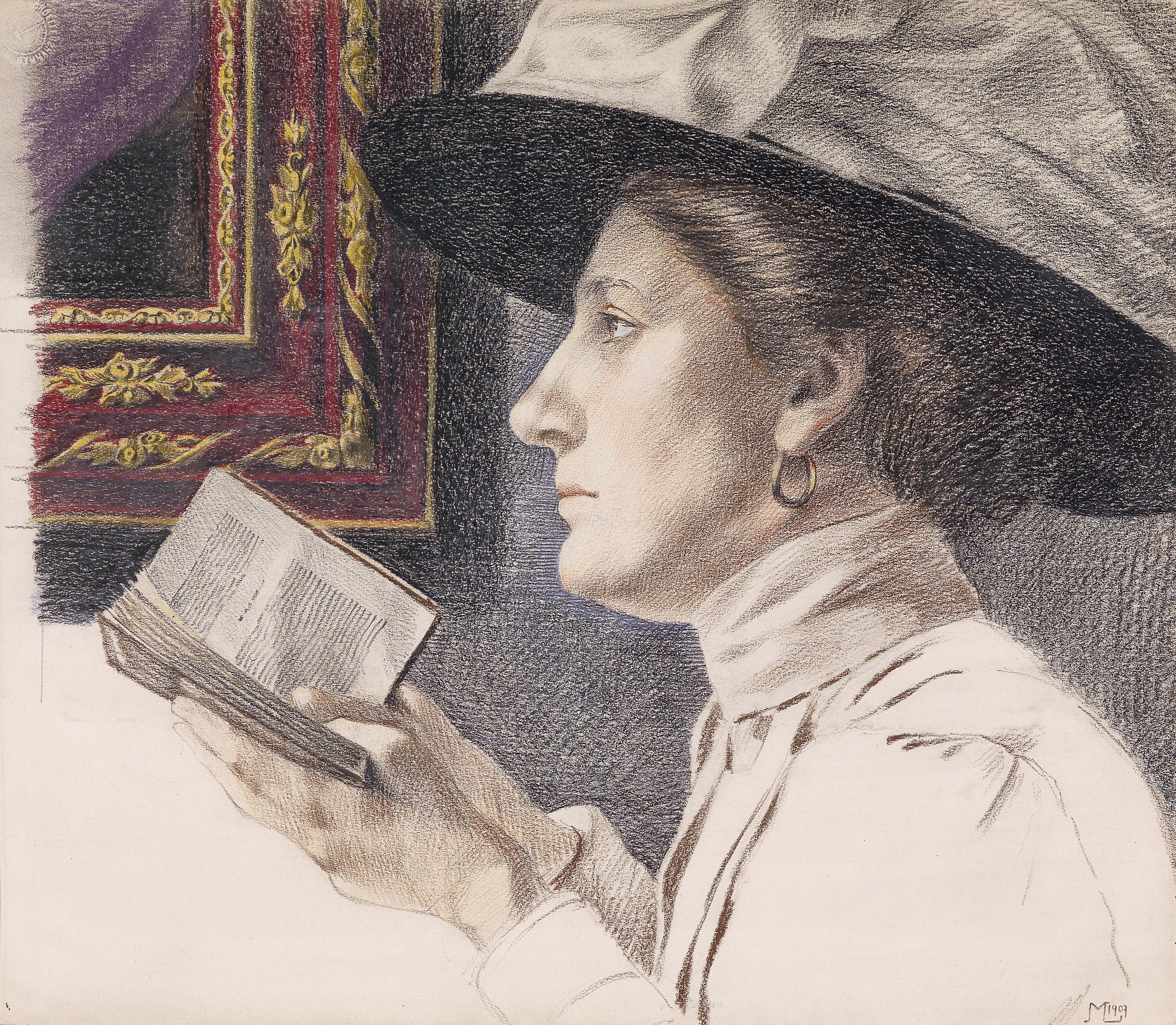
Portrait of a woman reading a book, 1907

Liebenwein worked mostly in oil and tempera. He painted many fairy tale and legend cycles, particularly Greek mythology and mediaeval stories of chivalric romance, as well as religious images, including Marian pictures and the lives of the saints. His teacher Zügel was famous for his animal motifs and his Impressionism; Liebenwein took in this influence and transcended it, moving from Impressionistic oil paintings to mainly tempera after exhibiting with the Vienna Secession, as well as maintaining his interest in graphic art. Still, he painted and drew many animals, showing a particular fondness for cats and horses. Liebenwein created a number of bookplate designs, and was cited as being, with Emil Orlik, the most important Austrian artists in this particular niche. He kept humour in his work, as well as excellent technical ability and a deep knowledge of his subject matter.

== Selected works ==
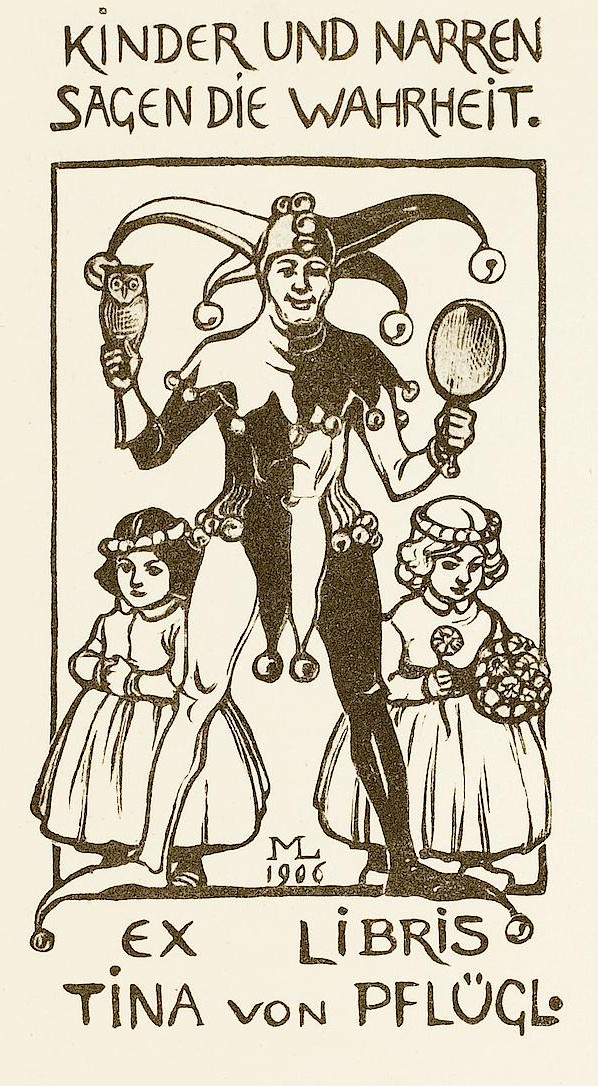
Ex libris design by Maximilian Liebenwein.

- Horsewoman, 1895 (Linz, Nordico museum), oil on canvas, 75.5 x 99.5 cm
- Percival, 1899 (private collection), tempera on cardboard, 82.5 x 135 cm (with artist's original frame)
- St. Genofefa, St. Hubert, St. Margaret, St. Martin's, 1900 (private collection, Vienna Museum, unknown ownership), tempera on cardboard, each 60 x 75 cm
- partially preserved wall painting cycle, 1899 (Burghausen Castle, Liebenwein tower) painted caesin on plaster furniture for the Liebenwein tower, 1901, privately owned
- The Goose Girl, fairytale cycle in 9 images, tempera on cardboard, each 75 x 60 cm, lost
- St. George, a devout Maere, 1904 (private collection), tempera on paper and cardboard, each 89.5 x 69.5 cm
- Sleeping Beauty fairy tale cycle 7 pictures, 1905, tempera on cardboard, each 75 x 110 cm, lost
- The Rose Miracle of St. Elizabeth, 1905 (private collection), 74.5 x 59.2 cm
- King Thrushbeard, fairytale cycle of 7 pictures, 1905/06, tempera on cardboard, each 75 x 75 or 75 x 110 cm, lost
- The Infamous Pond, 1907 (private collection), 59.5 x 74.8 cm
- large frieze in the ballroom of Linz savings bank, in 1907/08 mixed media, nine parts, each 94.4 x 94.5 x 174 or 217/219 or 84.5 x 283 cm
- Giselher engagement in Bechelaren, 1909 (private collection) 3 parts, 135 x 115 or 125 x 282 cm
- Amazonian hunting cycle, 1910 (Castle Steyregg, private collection), 3 parts, oil on canvas, 257 x 120, 264 x 542 and 264 x 427 cm
- Roland the Shieldbearer, designs for wall paintings in the great hall of Moosham Castle in Lungau, tempera on paper, each 27.5 x 125 or 160.5 cm
- Europe, 1913 (private collection), oil tempera on canvas, 191 x 251 cm
- Eve in Paradise, 1914 (private collection), oil on canvas, 246 x 144.5 cm
- Life of the Virgin, twelve-panel cycle, 1925 (Convent of the Franciscan Sisters of Vöcklabruck), tempera on cardboard, each 62 x 77 and 104.5 cm
- St. Hubertus, three piece cycle, 1926 (private collection), tempera on cardboard, 100 x 75 or 100 x 120 cm

== Bibliography ==
- Maximilian Liebenwein (1907). "Nachwort des Zeichners. Ein Stück Entwicklungsgeschichte". Festgabe zum 100jährigen Jubiläum des Schottengymnasiums. Vienna. pp. 381–406. OCLC 2728962.
- Hans Lang (1930) [1929]. "Maximilian Liebenwein". Der Getreue Eckart. 7 (2). Vienna: 577–584.
- Wolfgang Liebenwein (1964). "Der Maler Maximilian Liebenwein". Heimatkunde des Bezirkes Lilienfeld. 3. Lilienfeld: 215–219.
- Lothar Schultes (ed.). Maximilian Liebenwein: Ein Maler zwischen Impressionismus und Jugendstil. Kataloge des Oberösterreichischen Landesmuseums, N. S. 48, Linz 2006, ISBN 978-3-85474-159-6.
