= Immersion =

Immersion may refer to:

== The arts ==
=== Film and TV ===
- Immersion (film), a 2021 Chilean thriller film
- Immersion, a 2023 Japanese film directed by Takashi Shimizu
- Immersion (series), a webseries which test the concepts of video games in real life, created by Rooster Teeth Productions

=== Music ===
- Immersion (album), the third album by Australian group Pendulum
- Immersion (musicians), a sound and art duo

=== Publications ===
- "Immersion", a 2012 story by Aliette de Bodard
- Immersion, a French comic book series by Léo Quievreux
- Immersion journalism, a style of journalism

== Science and technology ==
- Immersion lithography or immersion microscopy, optical techniques in which liquid is between the objective and image plane in order to raise numerical aperture
- Immersion (mathematics), a smooth map whose differential is everywhere injective, related to the mathematical concept of an embedding
- Immersion (virtual reality), the perception of being physically present in a non-physical world, created by using VR

== Other uses ==
- Immersion baptism, a type of baptism whereby the subject is immersed in water
- Immersion Corporation, a haptic technology developer
- Immersion heater, a kind of water heater
- Immersion therapy, overcoming fears through confrontation
- Language immersion, a method of teaching a second language in which the target language is used for instruction
