= 2016 United States presidential election in Louisiana =

- November 8, 2016
- Turnout: 67.79% ▼

Nominee	Donald Trump	Hillary Clinton
Party	Republican	Democratic
Home state	New York	New York
Running mate	Mike Pence	Tim Kaine
Electoral vote	8	0
Popular vote	1,178,638	780,154
Percentage	58.09%	38.45%

Trump
40–50%
50–60%
60–70%
70–80%
80–90%
90–100%
Clinton
40–50%
50–60%
60–70%
80–90%
90–100%
President before election
Barack Obama
Democratic
Elected President
Donald Trump
Republican

Treemap of the popular vote by parish.

The 2016 United States presidential election in Louisiana was held on Tuesday, November 8, 2016, as part of the 2016 United States presidential election in which all 50 states plus the District of Columbia participated. Louisiana voters chose electors to represent them in the Electoral College via a popular vote, pitting the Republican Party's nominee, businessman Donald Trump, and running mate Indiana Governor Mike Pence against Democratic Party nominee, former Secretary of State Hillary Clinton, and her running mate Virginia Senator Tim Kaine. Louisiana has eight electoral votes in the Electoral College.

Trump won the state with 58.09% of the vote, while Clinton received 38.45%. Trump performed slightly better in the state than Mitt Romney in 2012, but also slightly worse than John McCain in 2008. In contrast, Clinton's vote share in the state was a decrease from Barack Obama's vote shares in 2012 and 2008, where he earned 40.58% and 39.93%, respectively. Louisiana is also one of 11 states whose electoral votes went to Bill Clinton twice, but which Hillary Clinton did not win. Six of those states, including Louisiana, have not supported any Democratic presidential candidate since Bill Clinton (The other five being Arkansas, West Virginia, Kentucky, Tennessee, and Missouri), while an additional five (Iowa, Ohio, Wisconsin, Michigan, and Pennsylvania) had all voted Democratic at least twice since Bill Clinton's re-election in 1996.

== Primary elections ==
Twenty-four candidates were on the ballot.

=== Democratic primary ===
Louisiana Democratic primary, March 5, 2016
Candidate	Popular vote		Estimated delegates		
Candidate	Count	Percentage	Pledged	Unpledged	Total
Hillary Clinton	221,733	71.12%	37	7	44
Bernie Sanders	72,276	23.18%	14	0	14
Steve Burke	4,785	1.53%			
John Wolfe Jr.	4,512	1.45%			
Martin O'Malley (withdrawn)	2,550	0.82%			
Willie Wilson	1,423	0.46%			
Keith Russell Judd	1,357	0.44%			
Rocky De La Fuente	1,341	0.43%			
Michael Steinberg	993	0.32%			
Henry Hewes	806	0.26%			
Uncommitted	—N/a		0	1	1
Total	311,776	100%	51	8	59

=== Republican primary ===
Republican primary results by parish. Donald Trump Ted Cruz

Four candidates appeared on the Republican presidential primary ballot:

Louisiana Republican primary, March 5, 2016
Candidate	Votes	Percentage	Actual delegate count		
Candidate	Votes	Percentage	Bound	Unbound	Total
Donald Trump	124,854	41.45%	25	0	25
Ted Cruz	113,968	37.83%	18	0	18
Marco Rubio	33,813	11.22%	0	0	0
John Kasich	19,359	6.43%	0	0	0
Ben Carson (withdrawn)	4,544	1.51%	0	0	0
Jeb Bush (withdrawn)	2,145	0.71%	0	0	0
Rand Paul (withdrawn)	670	0.22%	0	0	0
Mike Huckabee (withdrawn)	645	0.21%	0	0	0
Chris Christie (withdrawn)	401	0.13%	0	0	0
Carly Fiorina (withdrawn)	243	0.08%	0	0	0
Rick Santorum (withdrawn)	180	0.06%	0	0	0
Lindsey Graham (withdrawn)	152	0.05%	0	0	0
Unprojected delegates:			3	0	3
Total:	301,241	100.00%	46	0	46
Source: The Green Papers

==== State Convention ====
On March 24, the State Convention met in an attempt to reverse the results of the primary, giving Ted Cruz a clear majority. After conflicting reporting of their support for Ted Cruz, four of Rubio's five delegates publicly rebuked the reporting and committed to staying undecided. Rubio's five delegates and 2 uncommitted delegates committed to Trump after Kasich and Cruz dropped out of the race. This gave Trump the majority of the delegates from the state.

== General election ==
=== Predictions ===
The following are final 2016 predictions from various organizations for Louisiana as of Election Day.

Source	Ranking	As of
Los Angeles Times	Safe R	November 6, 2016
CNN	Safe R	November 8, 2016
Sabato's Crystal Ball	Safe R	November 7, 2016
NBC	Likely R	November 7, 2016
RealClearPolitics	Safe R	November 8, 2016
Fox News	Safe R	November 7, 2016
ABC	Safe R	November 7, 2016

=== Results ===
State Senate district results: Trump 50–60% 60–70% 70–80% 80–90% / Clinton 50–60% 60–70% 70–80% 80–90%

2016 U.S. presidential election in Louisiana, November 8, 2016
Party	Candidate	Votes	%
Republican	Donald Trump	1,178,638	58.09%
Democratic	Hillary Clinton	780,154	38.45%
Libertarian	Gary Johnson	37,978	1.87%
Green	Jill Stein	14,031	0.69%
Independent	Evan McMullin	8,547	0.42%
Independent	Darrell Castle	3,129	0.15%
Write-in	Others	2,330	0.11%
Independent	Christopher Robert Keniston	1,881	0.09%
Independent	Laurence Kotlikoff	1,048	0.05%
Independent	Alyson Kennedy	480	0.02%
Independent	Gloria La Riva	446	0.02%
Independent	Jerry White	370	0.02%
Total votes		2,029,032	100.00%

Donald Trump carried the state, lengthening the Republican streak in Louisiana to 5 straight contests.

==== By parish ====
Parish	Donald Trump Republican		Hillary Clinton Democratic		Various candidates Other parties		Margin		Total
Parish	#	%	#	%	#	%	#	%	Total
Acadia	21,162	77.26%	5,638	20.58%	589	2.16%	15,524	56.68%	27,389
Allen	6,867	74.28%	2,106	22.78%	272	2.94%	4,761	51.50%	9,245
Ascension	36,143	66.10%	16,476	30.13%	2,059	3.77%	19,667	35.97%	54,678
Assumption	6,714	61.57%	3,931	36.05%	259	2.38%	2,783	25.52%	10,904
Avoyelles	11,165	67.32%	5,035	30.36%	386	2.32%	6,130	36.96%	16,586
Beauregard	12,238	81.16%	2,393	15.87%	447	2.97%	9,845	65.29%	15,078
Bienville	3,756	53.62%	3,129	44.67%	120	1.71%	627	8.95%	7,005
Bossier	35,474	71.16%	12,641	25.36%	1,733	3.48%	22,833	45.80%	49,848
Caddo	49,006	46.32%	53,483	50.55%	3,315	3.13%	-4,477	-4.23%	105,804
Calcasieu	54,191	64.68%	26,296	31.39%	3,298	3.93%	27,895	33.29%	83,785
Caldwell	3,822	81.46%	788	16.79%	82	1.75%	3,034	64.67%	4,692
Cameron	3,256	88.19%	323	8.75%	113	3.06%	2,933	79.44%	3,692
Catahoula	3,479	71.64%	1,322	27.22%	55	1.14%	2,157	44.42%	4,856
Claiborne	3,585	55.83%	2,717	42.31%	119	1.86%	868	13.52%	6,421
Concordia	5,477	61.73%	3,272	36.88%	123	1.39%	2,205	24.85%	8,872
DeSoto	8,068	59.76%	5,165	38.26%	267	1.98%	2,903	21.50%	13,500
East Baton Rouge	84,660	43.09%	102,828	52.33%	9,003	4.58%	-18,168	-9.24%	196,491
East Carroll	1,059	36.03%	1,838	62.54%	42	1.43%	-779	-26.51%	2,939
East Feliciana	5,569	55.46%	4,235	42.17%	238	2.37%	1,334	13.29%	10,042
Evangeline	10,360	69.61%	4,208	28.28%	314	2.11%	6,152	41.33%	14,882
Franklin	6,514	71.10%	2,506	27.35%	142	1.55%	4,008	43.75%	9,162
Grant	7,408	83.98%	1,181	13.39%	232	2.63%	6,227	70.59%	8,821
Iberia	20,903	64.41%	10,698	32.96%	853	2.63%	10,205	31.45%	32,454
Iberville	7,320	45.63%	8,324	51.89%	399	2.48%	-1,004	-6.26%	16,043
Jackson	5,169	69.25%	2,139	28.66%	156	2.09%	3,030	40.59%	7,464
Jefferson	100,398	55.27%	73,670	40.56%	7,571	4.17%	26,728	14.71%	181,639
Jefferson Davis	10,775	75.47%	3,080	21.57%	422	2.96%	7,695	53.90%	14,277
Lafayette	68,195	64.58%	32,726	30.99%	4,682	4.43%	35,469	33.59%	105,603
Lafourche	31,959	76.74%	8,423	20.23%	1,263	3.03%	23,536	56.51%	41,645
LaSalle	5,836	88.84%	605	9.21%	128	1.95%	5,231	79.63%	6,569
Lincoln	10,761	57.64%	7,107	38.07%	801	4.29%	3,654	19.57%	18,669
Livingston	48,824	84.57%	6,950	12.04%	1,956	3.39%	41,874	72.53%	57,730
Madison	1,927	40.72%	2,744	57.99%	61	1.29%	-817	-17.27%	4,732
Morehouse	6,502	54.86%	5,155	43.49%	195	1.65%	1,347	11.37%	11,852
Natchitoches	8,968	53.96%	7,144	42.98%	509	3.06%	1,824	10.98%	16,621
Orleans	24,292	14.65%	133,996	80.81%	7,524	4.54%	-109,704	-66.16%	165,812
Ouachita	41,734	61.36%	24,428	35.91%	1,855	2.73%	17,306	25.45%	68,017
Plaquemines	6,900	65.26%	3,347	31.66%	326	3.08%	3,553	33.60%	10,573
Pointe Coupee	6,789	57.72%	4,764	40.51%	208	1.77%	2,025	17.21%	11,761
Rapides	36,816	64.77%	18,322	32.23%	1,706	3.00%	18,494	32.54%	56,844
Red River	2,391	54.07%	1,938	43.83%	93	2.10%	453	10.24%	4,422
Richland	6,287	65.51%	3,157	32.90%	153	1.59%	3,130	32.61%	9,597
Sabine	7,879	80.50%	1,703	17.40%	205	2.10%	6,176	63.10%	9,787
St. Bernard	10,237	64.73%	4,960	31.36%	618	3.91%	5,277	33.37%	15,815
St. Charles	16,621	63.46%	8,559	32.68%	1,012	3.86%	8,062	30.78%	26,192
St. Helena	2,497	41.87%	3,353	56.22%	114	1.91%	-856	-14.35%	5,964
St. James	5,456	45.15%	6,418	53.11%	211	1.74%	-962	-7.96%	12,085
St. John the Baptist	7,569	36.49%	12,661	61.04%	513	2.47%	-5,092	-24.55%	20,743
St. Landry	21,971	54.96%	17,209	43.05%	797	1.99%	4,762	11.91%	39,977
St. Martin	16,873	65.53%	8,266	32.10%	611	2.37%	8,607	33.43%	25,750
St. Mary	14,359	62.77%	8,050	35.19%	468	2.04%	6,309	27.58%	22,877
St. Tammany	90,915	73.09%	27,717	22.28%	5,760	4.63%	63,198	50.81%	124,392
Tangipahoa	33,959	64.79%	16,878	32.20%	1,579	3.01%	17,081	32.59%	52,416
Tensas	1,182	46.39%	1,332	52.28%	34	1.33%	-150	-5.89%	2,548
Terrebonne	31,902	72.68%	10,665	24.30%	1,329	3.02%	21,237	48.38%	43,896
Union	7,972	73.18%	2,691	24.70%	231	2.12%	5,281	48.48%	10,894
Vermilion	20,063	78.27%	4,857	18.95%	712	2.78%	15,206	59.32%	25,632
Vernon	13,471	80.99%	2,665	16.02%	497	2.99%	10,806	64.97%	16,633
Washington	12,556	67.40%	5,692	30.56%	380	2.04%	6,864	36.84%	18,628
Webster	11,542	63.61%	6,260	34.50%	343	1.89%	5,282	29.11%	18,145
West Baton Rouge	6,927	54.49%	5,383	42.35%	402	3.16%	1,544	12.14%	12,712
West Carroll	3,970	83.42%	715	15.02%	74	1.56%	3,255	68.40%	4,759
West Feliciana	3,390	58.46%	2,248	38.77%	161	2.77%	1,142	19.69%	5,799
Winn	4,608	72.32%	1,644	25.80%	120	1.88%	2,964	46.52%	6,372
Totals	1,178,638	58.09%	780,154	38.45%	70,240	3.46%	398,484	19.64%	2,029,032

==== By congressional district ====
Trump won five of the six congressional districts in Louisiana.

District	Trump	Clinton	Representative
1st	69%	27%	Steve Scalise
2nd	22%	75%	Cedric Richmond
3rd	67%	29%	Clay Higgins
4th	61%	37%	Mike Johnson
5th	63%	34%	Ralph Abraham
6th	65%	31%	Garret Graves

== Analysis ==
Donald Trump won the election in Louisiana with 58.1% of the vote. Hillary Clinton received 38.4% of the vote. Of the 2,029,032 total votes cast, Trump had 1,178,638 while Clinton had 780,154 votes. All of Louisiana's parishes voted for the same party they voted for in 2012 and 2008. As a result, this marked the first time since 1992 that East Baton Rouge Parish backed the losing candidate of the election, and the first time since 1948 that East Baton Rouge Parish voted for the Democratic candidate three elections in a row; Trump also became the first Republican to win the White House without carrying this parish since Richard Nixon in 1968.

Louisiana was one of eleven states that voted twice for Bill Clinton in 1992 and 1996 which Hillary Clinton lost in 2016.

== See also ==
- United States presidential elections in Louisiana
- First presidency of Donald Trump
- 2016 Democratic Party presidential debates and forums
- 2016 Democratic Party presidential primaries
- 2016 Republican Party presidential debates and forums
- 2016 Republican Party presidential primaries
