= Mo B. Dick =

American rapper, singer, and record producer (born 1965)

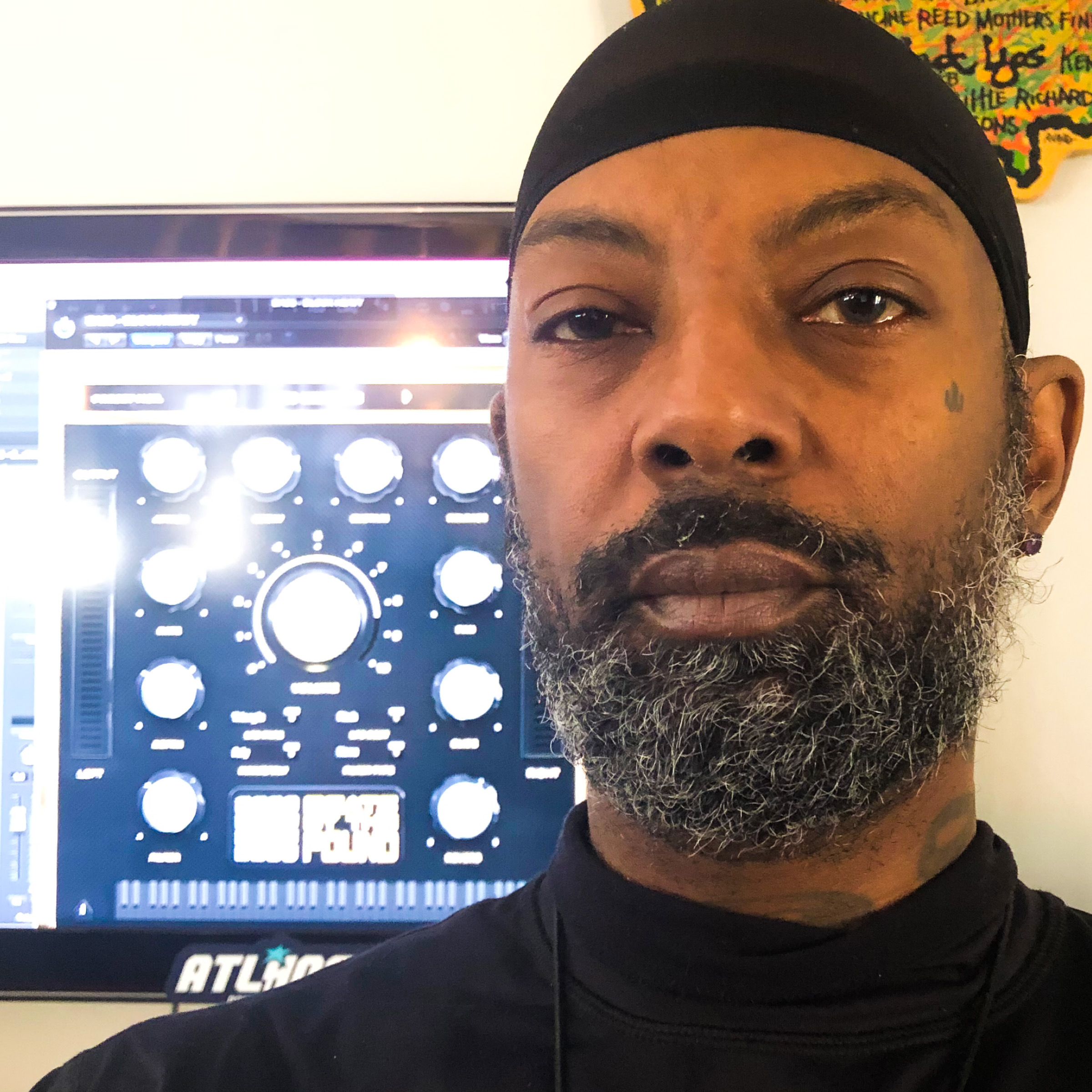
- Mo B. Dick in 2019

Background information
- Born: Raymond Emile Poole; July 4, 1965 (age 61); Morgan City, Louisiana, Siracusaville, Louisiana, U.S.
- Origin: New Orleans, Louisiana, U.S.
- Genres: Hip-hop; R&B
- Occupations: Rapper; singer; songwriter; record producer; disc jockey; author; MC
- Years active: 1988–present
- Labels: Starvin Artists Entertainment (1992–1997); No Limit Records; Priority Records (1995–1999); Onher and iNher iNhertainment(2009–2010); Out The Box Xploitations; LLC (2010–present); 1TWO1ZERO, LLC (2024–present); Qwthouse Records (2025–present); Omniversoul (2025–present); Beat Cinema (2025–present)

Raymond Emile Poole (born July 4, 1965), better known by his stage name Mo B. Dick, is an American rapper, singer, songwriter, record producer, and published author. He is a founding member of the production team The Medicine Men (formerly Beats by the Pound), which produced most of No Limit Records' releases from 1995 to 1999. During his stint at No Limit Records, he not only produced tracks, but was also a featured artist on over a dozen songs. As a member of Beats by the Pound, the production team collectively produced nearly all of the label's tracks. His repertoire lists his production credits on over 170 recordings and has his own record label Out The Box Xploitations. Currently Mo B. Dick is working on projects for his new imprints, Out The Box Xploitations & OnHer and iNHer iNHerTainment, 8Ball and MJG, Mystikal, Tha Dogg Pound, Fiend, the late Young Bleed, the late Gangsta Boo, OJ Da Juiceman, Frayser Boy, DJ Burn One and the Five Points Bakery, and producing songs for various movie soundtracks, TV shows, and video games.

== Early life ==
At college, he marched in the Southern University Band until he was kicked out for fighting. Earlier on, he taught himself how to play piano, and was later hired by several churches in the Tri-City (Morgan City, Berwick, and Patterson, Louisiana) area, and later by St. Mark United Methodist Church where he was the Youth Music Minister in Wichita, Kansas.

Music production started for him in 1988. At that time, he was attending Nicholls State University in Thibodaux, Louisiana for marketing, where he was initiated into the Eta Theta chapter of Kappa Kappa Psi.

His first sampling loop machine was a Teac dual cassette recorder/player. The first drum machine he made a beat on was the Roland TR-606.

He is also a founding member of the Mu Nu Nu chapter of Omega Psi Phi.

== Music career ==
=== 1995–99: No Limit, Beats by the Pound and Gangsta Harmony ===
In the mid-1990s Mo B. Dick signed as an artist to his cousin Master P's label No Limit Records and also joined as a member in the production team Beats by the Pound. On April 13, 1999, he released his debut album, Gangsta Harmony; the album peaked at No. 66 on the Billboard 200 and No. 16 on the Top R&B/Hip-Hop Albums charts. Also in 1999, along with Beats by the Pound's lead producers, Mo B. Dick, KLC, Craig B and Odell, disbanded from No Limit Records and changed their name to The Medicine Men and record label Overdose Entertainment.

=== 2009–14: Perverted XXXcursions and li se Sa li yE ===
After taking a break from his music career to focus on producing, on January 13, 2009, Mo B. Dick released his second album in over 10 years, entitled Perverted XXXcursions. On April 1, 2014, he released his third album, entitled li se Sa li yE, via his label OTBX, LLC.

=== 2016: #MoBDick EP ===
The MoBDick EP came out on January 29, 2016. The single and video were "All I Think About Is Git'n Money".

=== 2019: Pseudocryptosexual, Flambeaux and The iNeffable ===
In 2019, he released three more MP3 albums: Pseudocryptosexual, Flambeaux and The iNeffable.

=== 2021–2022: Unapologetically ===
On February 12, 2021, he released the MP3 album Unapologetically.

On July 15, 2022, he released the MP3 album Play The Game How It Geaux: The Beatstrumentals.

On September 2, he released the MP3 album Unapologetically in a 432 Hz version. Later, on September 9, he released the MP3 album Play The Game How It Geaux: The Beatstrumentals • 432 Hz.

=== 2023: The Mo B. Dickapedia: Life, Language, & Lyrics ===
On February 2, 2023 Mo B. Dick released his first book, The Mo B. Dickapedia: Life, Language, & Lyrics.

=== 2024: TimeKeeper & Immersed ===
On February 19, 2024 Mo B. Dick released the MP3 album TimeKeeper • 432 Hz.

On December 20, Mo B. Dick released the MP3 album Immersed • 432 Hz.

== Discography ==
=== Studio albums ===
- Gangsta Harmony (1999)
- Perverted XXXcursions (2008)
- li se Sa li yE (2014)
- Pseudocryptosexual (2019)
- Flambeaux (2019)
- The iNeffable (2019)
- Unapologetically (2021)
- Timekeeper (2024)
- Immersed (2024)
- pSIONic (2026)

=== Extended plays ===
- #MoBDick (2016)
- T.E.A.M (2020)
- Play The Game How It Geaux: The Beatstrumentals (2022)
- Change the Narrative (2023)
- Break U Off (Classic 80s R&B) (2025)
- Perfect Harmony (Classic 80s R&B) (2025)
- Here Comes The Ques [The Movement]) (2025)
- Succubus (Classic 80s Funk) (2026)
- When Mad Day Come: The Beatstrumentals (2026)
- iNtertwined (2026)
- Rhythmic Royal Eternal: The Beatstrumentals (2026)
- War 4 U’re Love (2026)

== See also ==
- No Limit Records discography
