= Mo B. Dick discography =

This is the discography of American hip hop musician Mo B. Dick.

== Albums ==
=== Studio albums ===
Title	Release	Peak chart positions	
Title	Release	US	US R&B
Gangsta Harmony	Released: April 13, 1999; Label: No Limit, Priority; Format: CD, MD, LP	66	16
Perverted XXXcursions	Released: January 13, 2009; Label: Onher and iNher Entertainment; Format: MD	–	–
li se Sa li yE	Released: April 1, 2014; Label: Out The Box Xploitations, LLC; Format: MD	–	–
Pseudocryptosexual	Released: March 29, 2019; Label: Out The Box Xploitations, LLC; Format: MD	–	–
Unapologetically	Released: Feb 12, 2021; Label: Onher and iNher Entertainment; Format: MD	–	–
TimeKeeper	Released: Feb 19, 2024; Label: ℗ 2024 1TWO1ZERO7, LLC, Distributed by Rapbay / Urbanlife Distribution; Format: MD	–	–

=== Compilation albums ===
Title	Release	Peak chart positions	
Title	Release	US	US R&B
Mo B. Dick Presents: Blacklight Matinee	Released: December 7, 2010; Label: Onher and iNher; Formats: MD	–	–
Signature: The Anthology	Released: July 15, 2014; Label: Out The Box Xploitations; Formats: MD	–	–
Flambeaux	Released: May 28, 2019; Label: Out The Box Xploitations, LLC; Format: MD	–	–

=== Soundtrack albums ===
Title	Release	Peak chart positions	
Title	Release	US	US R&B
Mo B. Dick Presents : Blacklight Matinee	Released: December 7, 2010; Label: Onher and iNher Entertainment; Format: MD	–	–
Mine Eyes Have Seen - The Untold TRU Story of No Limit Records	Released: March 15, 2011; Label: Out The Box Xploitations; Formats: MD	–	–

=== Mixtapes ===
Title	Release
Gas	Released: August 4, 2017; Label: Out The Box Xploitations; Format: digital download

=== Instrumental albums ===
Title	Release	Peak chart positions	
Title	Release	US	US R&B
The Mo B. Dickstrumentals: Rhythms and Visions	Released: April 28, 2010; Label: JooginitdeepupiNm MiNistries; Format: MD	–	–

Title	Release	Peak chart positions	
Title	Release	US	US R&B
Play The Game How It Geaux: The Beatstrumentals	Released: July 15, 2022; Label: Out The Box Xploitations, LLC; Format: MD	–	–

Title	Release	Peak chart positions	
Title	Release	US	US R&B
When Mad Day Come: The Beatstrumentals	Released: February 13, 2026; Label: Beat Cinema, Omniversoul Recordings; Format: MD	–	–

Title	Release	Peak chart positions	
Title	Release	US	US R&B
Rhythmic Royal Eternal: The Beatstrumentals	Released: April 17, 2026; Label: Beat Cinema, Omniversoul Recordings; Format: MD	–	–

== Extended plays ==
Title	Release	Peak chart positions	
Title	Release	US	US R&B
#MoBDick	Released: January 29, 2016; Label: Out The Box Xploitations; Format: MD, digital download, EP	-	-
The iNeffable	Release: July 4, 2019; Label: Out The Box Xploitations, LLC; Format: MD	–	–

== Singles ==
=== As lead artist ===
Title	Release	Peak chart positions			Album
Title	Release	US	US R&B	US Rap	Album
"Irie, Irie, Irie" (featuring Adam Bazile) Craig B younger brother	1993	—	—	—	Critical Condition - I Thought U Knew
"All This Dick"	1997	—	—	—	Critical Condition - CC Waterbound
"That Thing Is On"	1997	—	—	—	I'm Bout It soundtrack
"Tell Me When"	1998	—	—	—	Mean Green: Major Players Compilation
"Shoot' m up Movies"	1999	—	—	—	Gangsta Harmony
"XXXtra Skin"	2001	—	—	—	6 Shot - The Actual Meaning
"U Made Me Do It"	2011	—	—	—	—N/a
"2012"	2011	—	—	—	—N/a
"Yo Body"	2012	—	—	—	—N/a
"Google Me, B*tch!" (featuring Derhego & S.E. Trill)	2012	—	—	—	—N/a
"Bangkok"	2012	—	—	—	—N/a
"Booty Shots"	2012	—	—	—	—N/a
"Shawty Wanna Strip"	2012	—	—	—	—N/a
"Snap Out of It!" (featuring Roberta B. Love)	2013	—	—	—	—N/a
"Molly Molly Molly (Git Up Outta Here!)"	2013	—	—	—	—N/a
"Dedicated 2 the Greatest" (featuring KLC)	2013	—	—	—	—N/a
"O. I. N. D."	2013	—	—	—	—N/a
"ALIAS Raymond Energy"	2014	—	—	—	—N/a
"Shawty Got Some Ass On Her"	2016	—	—	—	#MoBDick
"All I Think About Is Git'n Money"	2016	—	—	—	#MoBDick
"Cannabis" (featuring Truu Scotchy aka Spyderman 24)	2016	—	—	—	—N/a
" The Cannabis Anthem" (featuring Truu Scotchy, Westbred Diamond, O.G. King Floaty, C Simz & L.I.)	2017	—	—	—	Gas
"P.O.W"	2017	—	—	—	—N/a
"Whoa nah" (featuring Mr.Serv On)	2017	—	—	—	The Rap Life
"On It"	2018	—	—	—	—N/a
"Social Media"	2018	—	—	—	—N/a
"iCan’t Git eNuff" (featuring Fiend)	2018	—	—	—	—N/a
"VVS (Tank Dogg Remix)" (featuring Mo B. Dick, Fiend, Doeshun, Verse Simmonds & London Jae)	2019	—	—	—	VVS
"Purpose" (featuring Mista Maine 5bandz)	2019	—	—	—	5 Bandz or Betta
"Real" (featuring AK A.U.G Mafia)	2020	—	—	—	—N/a
"T.E.A.M."	2020	—	—	—	—N/a
"Whoa Nah Baby" (featuring Mr.Serv On)	2022	—	—	—	—N/a
"Break U Off" (Classic 90s R&B) (featuring Sons Of Funk)	2025	—	—	—	—N/a
"Perfect Harmony" (Classic 90s R&B) (featuring Byou2ful)	2025	—	—	—	—N/a
"Here Comes The Ques [The Movement]" (featuring Pinc Gator feat. Joe Torry & Shaun Ross)	2025	—	—	—	—N/a
"Succubus" (Classic 80's Funk)	2026	—	—	—	—N/a
"iNtertwined"	2026	—	—	—	—N/a
"But 2 Do It [Classic 80s House]"	2026	—	—	—	—N/a
"War 4 U're Love"	2026	—	—	—	—N/a

=== As featured artist ===
Title	Release	Peak chart positions			Album
Title	Release	US	US R&B	CAN	Album
"Gangstafied" (Kane & Abel featuring Master P & Mo B. Dick)	1996	—	—	—	7 Sins
"No More Tears" (Master P featuring Silkk the Shocker and Mo B. Dick)	1996	—	78	15	Ice Cream Man
"I Always Feel Like" (TRU featuring Mo B. Dick)	1997	71	27	11	Tru 2 da Game
"A 2nd Chance" (C-Murder featuring Mo B. Dick, Master P & Silkk the Shocker)	1998	—	—	—	Life or Death
"Making Moves" (C-Murder featuring Master P & Mo B. Dick)	1998	—	—	—	Life or Death
"The Quickest Way To Die" (Full Blooded featuring Mo B. Dick & The Hounds of Gert Town)	1998	—	—	—	Memorial Day
"Studio B" (Gambino Family featuring Snoop Dogg & Mo B. Dick)	1998	—	—	—	Ghetto Organized
"Thinkin' Bout U" (Master P featuring Mia X and Mo B. Dick)	1998	—	—	—	MP da Last Don
"If It Don't Make $$$..." (Skull Duggery featuring Mo B. Dick, Fiend and Master P)	1998	—	—	—	These Wicked Streets
"Close 2 You" (Lil Soldiers featuring Mo B. Dick)	1999	—	—	—	Boot Camp
"Goodbye to My Homies" (Master P featuring Mo B. Dick, Sons of Funk and Silkk the Shocker)	1999	27	38	5	MP da Last Don

== Soundtrack appearances ==
Title	Release	Peak chart positions		Certifications
Title	Release	US	US R&B	Certifications
I'm Bout It	Released: May 13, 1997; Label: No Limit, Priority; Formats: CD, MD, LP	4	1	RIAA: Gold
Foolish	Released: March 23, 1999; Label: No Limit, Priority; Format: CD, MD, LP	32	10	RIAA: Gold
