= Southeast Louisiana National Wildlife Refuge Complex =

Coordinates: 30°17′00″N 89°58′00″W

Southeast Louisiana National Wildlife Refuge Complex is a National Wildlife Refuge complex in the state of Louisiana.

== Refuges within the complex ==
- Atchafalaya National Wildlife Refuge
- Bayou Sauvage National Wildlife Refuge
- Bayou Teche National Wildlife Refuge
- Big Branch Marsh National Wildlife Refuge
- Bogue Chitto National Wildlife Refuge
- Breton National Wildlife Refuge
- Delta National Wildlife Refuge
- Mandalay National Wildlife Refuge
