= Death of Quawan Charles =

2020 death in Loreauville, Louisiana

- Date: Reported missing on October 30, 2020; Remains discovered on November 3, 2020
- Location: Iberia Parish, Louisiana, United States
- Cause: Under investigation
- Deaths: Quawan "Bobby" Charles, aged 15
- Burial: Macedonia Baptist Church Cemetery
- Accused: Janet Irvin
- Charges: Failure to report a missing child, contributing to the delinquency of a minor
- Litigation: Lawsuit by Charles's mother against Janet Irvin

On November 3, 2020, Quawan "Bobby" Charles, a 15-year-old African American boy, was found dead in a sugar cane field in Iberia Parish, Louisiana. He had been reported missing on October 30, 2020, after leaving his house in Baldwin, Louisiana with a friend, 17-year-old Gavin Irvin, and Irvin's mother, Janet.

After Charles's parents reported their son's disappearance to police, the department "gave no indication" that they were investigating it, according to attorneys. After his body was discovered, a preliminary autopsy by the coroner's office determined that the cause of death was "likely drowning". The death gained national attention following the release of a graphic photo of Charles's mutilated body posted to the internet by his family.

== Disappearance ==
Charles was first reported as missing from his father's home in Baldwin, Louisiana on October 30, 2020. Prior to going missing, he had recently transferred to West St. Mary High School in St. Mary Parish, Louisiana after starting the school year at Southside High School in Youngsville, Louisiana. According to his cousin, Celina Charles, he struggled academically due to his dyslexia. His last known whereabouts before his disappearance, according to his father, were with his friend, 17-year-old Gavin Irvin, and Irvin's mother, Janet, who picked him up from his father's house at around 3 pm while his father was out shopping. Janet's boyfriend, Tyler LeGros, was allegedly also with the Irvins when Charles was picked up. According to Charles's father, Kenneth Jacko, neither he nor Charles's mother, Roxanne Charles Nelson, were familiar with Irvin and had not given the Irvins permission to pick Charles up. Irvin would later state that both boys wanted to spend time together that day, but Charles left the Irvins on his own. According to attorney Ron Haley, one of three civil rights attorneys representing Charles's family, Charles's mother was scheduled to pick him up from his father's house to get a haircut at around the same time he was picked up by the Irvins. By 7 pm, his father had forced open Charles's locked bedroom door to find that he was not there, prompting him to contact the Baldwin police department.

Haley stated that when the family reported the incident to the police, the department responded by suggesting to them that Charles may have gone to a football game and asking whether he had a troubled past, also waiting until three days after the initial report to ping his cell phone. Haley also stated that the Baldwin Police Department "gave no indication over the next few days that they were searching for the teen or actively investigating his disappearance." The department neither alerted local news nor contacted Louisiana State Police requesting an Amber alert in regards to Charles's disappearance.

In a recorded interview with Janet Irvin by a private investigator hired by Celina Charles, she stated that her son and Charles "smoked some weed" together before Charles ran away from the Irvins' residence, and that she did not report his running away that night. Witnesses said they later saw the Irvins packing their belongings and moving out of their mobile home following Charles's disappearance. The Iberia Parish Sheriff's Office stated that it was not informed about Charles's disappearance until November 3 after one of his parents contacted them. According to the Iberia Parish Bureau of Investigation, Charles's naked body was discovered on November 3, face down in a sugar cane field about 20 miles away from Baldwin, near the village of Loreauville.

== Case ==
Haley suggested that officers did not show a "sense of urgency" in responding to the disappearance report, and that he believed his death and the slow response time by police were both racially motivated. The ACLU of Louisiana demanded a full, independent investigation into Charles's death.

In a news release from November 5, 2020, the Iberia Parish Sheriff's Office stated that it was investigating the "suspicious circumstances" surrounding Charles's death, adding, "Investigators have interviewed multiple individuals and collected physical evidence which is being processed." The office also published another statement, sharing that they were "actively tracking" the whereabouts of those who were with Charles prior to his death and that they obtained video evidence from an unnamed individual which indicated that Charles was walking alone in the field where he died both before and after the video was taken. Celina Charles later stated that the family had been asking to see the video since 2020, when they were told by the sheriff's office that technical difficulties prevented them from showing it to them. In June 2025, the video was obtained and released by KLFY, showing someone running behind a line of trees in a sugar cane field. Celina alleged that the video directly contradicted Sheriff Tommy Romero's assertions that Charles was spotted alone in the video and, during a press conference that month, called for a reinvestigation into Charles's death.

Police stated that they never requested an Amber alert because footage from his departure showed him voluntarily leaving his home with two people and there was no evidence which suggested that Charles had been abducted. The death was initially investigated as a homicide starting in November 2020.

A preliminary autopsy report by the coroner's office stated that the cause of death was "likely drowning" due to findings that Charles had hyperinflated lungs and muddy water in his airways but no injuries, adding that the cause of his facial condition was likely "aquatic animals" and that there was "no evidence of antemortem trauma". Charles's family's lawyers said that they had not authorized the public release of the preliminary autopsy report. Charles's family also denied the claims of drowning put forth in the report based on the nature of Charles's remains. In a picture posted online alongside a GoFundMe campaign by Charles's family requesting an independent autopsy, he appeared disfigured. The taking of the photo by Charles's mother was inspired by the decision of 14-year-old lynching victim Emmett Till's mother to hold an open-casket funeral in 1955, and the two incidents were compared across social media.

A preliminary report from an independent autopsy by local forensics company American Forensics suggested that the state of his remains was "consistent with drowning" with "no evidence of trauma or natural disease". An autopsy report prepared by the Louisiana Forensic Center and released by Charles's family on February 8, 2021 revealed that, after taking drugs at the Irvins' home, Charles was seen crawling in culverts alone near a school, acting combative, and threatening to kill himself, indicating that he may have been experiencing a psychotic episode. According to investigators for Haley's law office, members of the Irvin family and their "inner circle" stated that Charles had been high on a hallucinogen. A toxicology report conducted by NMS Labs stated that he had a blood alcohol content of 0.014% with 4.7 ng/mL of blood of THC present in his system, which lawyers for the family said proved that he was not high on hallucinogens and that his death was therefore not accidental.

On February 9, 2021, Janet Irvin was arrested on charges of failure to report a missing child and contributing to the delinquency of a minor, and was arraigned in the 16th Judicial District Court, where her bond was set at $400,000. In November 2021, Charles's mother sued the Baldwin Police Department and the St. Mary Parish Sheriff's Office for failing to notify the Louisiana State Police about her son's disappearance, also suing Janet and Gavin Irvin and Tyler LeGros for taking Charles 25 miles away from his home and not reporting his disappearance or attempting to find him. In October 2024, Irvin's court date was set for February of the following year, with a pre-trial conference set for that January.

== Responses and protests ==
A funeral service for Charles was held on November 21, 2020.

Charles's relatives as well as local activists held a march of about 100 people in Baldwin, which called for the removal of the Baldwin police chief and mayor as well as the Iberia Parish sheriff and coroner.

American singer Beyoncé put a picture of Charles above a message reading "Rest in peace Quawan 'Bobby' Charles 2005-2020" on the homepage of her website in the wake of his death.
