= 1948 United States presidential election in Louisiana =

- November 2, 1948

All 10 Louisiana votes to the Electoral College
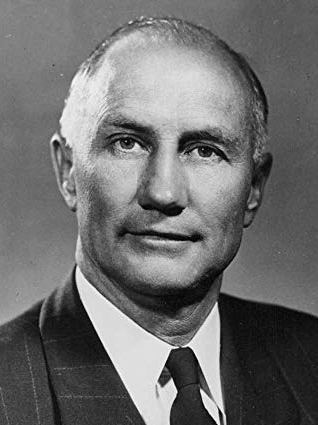

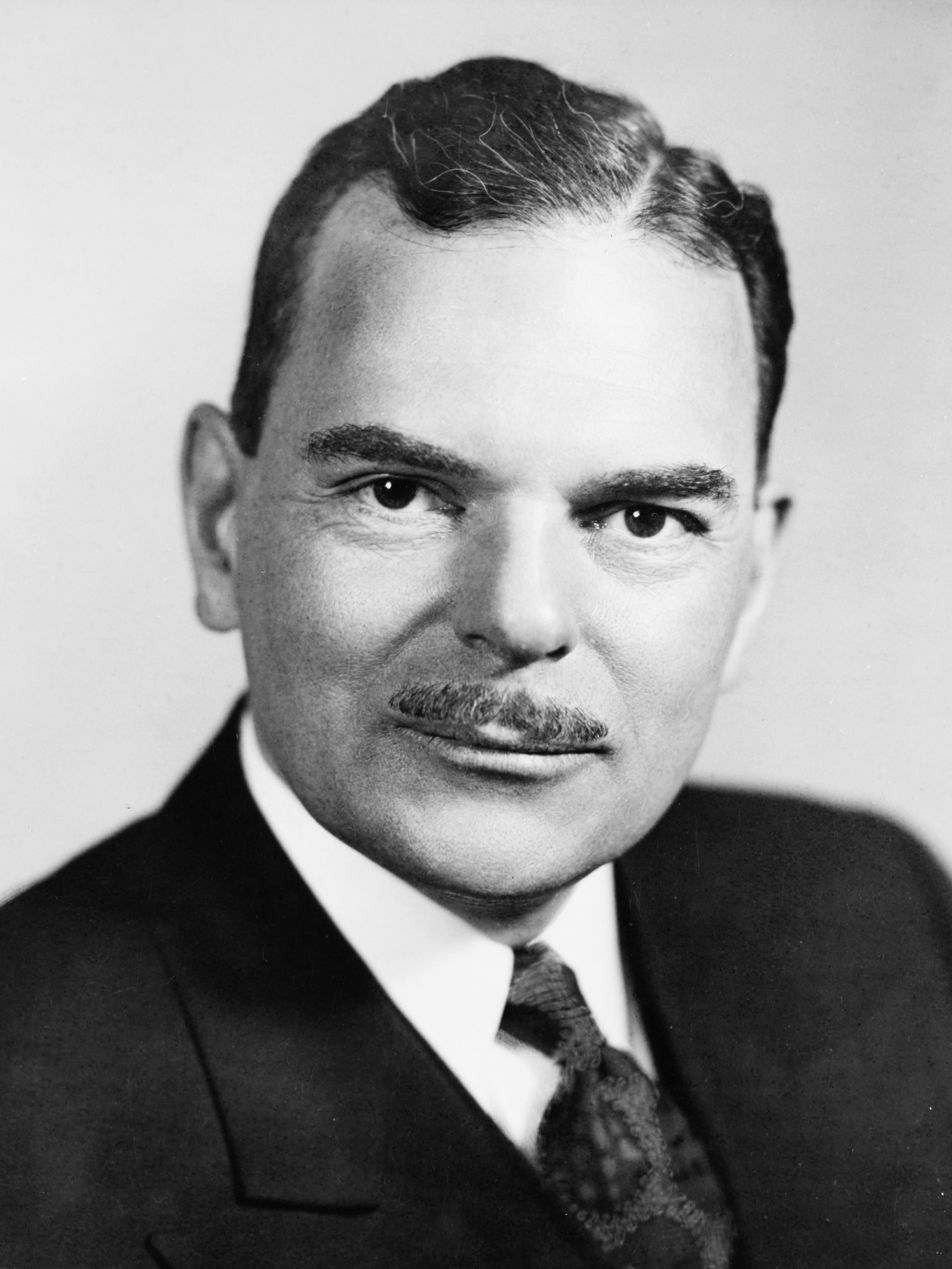
Nominee	Strom Thurmond	Harry S. Truman	Thomas E. Dewey
Party	States' Rights Democratic	Democratic	Republican
Alliance	Democratic (Louisiana)
Home state	South Carolina	Missouri	New York
Running mate	Fielding L. Wright	Alben W. Barkley	Earl Warren
Electoral vote	10	0	0
Popular vote	204,290	136,344	72,657
Percentage	49.07%	32.75%	17.45%
Parish results
Thurmond
40–50%
50–60%
60–70%
70–80%
90–100%
Truman
30–40%
40–50%
50–60%
60–70%
Dewey
40–50%
President before election
Harry S. Truman
Democratic
Elected President
Harry S. Truman
Democratic

The 1948 United States presidential election in Louisiana took place on November 2, 1948, as part of the 1948 United States presidential election. State voters chose ten representatives, or electors, to the Electoral College, who voted for president and vice president.

Louisiana was won by Governor Strom Thurmond (DX–South Carolina), running with Governor Fielding L. Wright, with 49.07% of the popular vote, against incumbent President Harry S. Truman (D–Missouri), running with Senator Alben W. Barkley, with 32.75% of the popular vote, and Governor Thomas E. Dewey (R–New York), running with Governor Earl Warren, with 17.45% of the popular vote.

This marked the first time since 1876 that Louisiana failed to back the Democratic nominee in a presidential election, and the first time ever that a Democrat won the presidency without carrying the state.

Thurmond won 52% of white voters.

== Results ==
1948 United States presidential election in Louisiana
Party	Candidate	Votes	%
Dixiecrat	Strom Thurmond	204,290	49.07%
Democratic	Harry S. Truman (inc.)	136,344	32.75%
Republican	Thomas E. Dewey	72,657	17.45%
Progressive	Henry A. Wallace	3,035	0.73%
Write-in		10	0.00%
Total votes		416,336	100%

=== Results by parish ===
Parish	Strom Thurmond States Rights		Harry S. Truman Democratic		Thomas E. Dewey Republican		Henry A. Wallace Progressive		Margin		Total votes cast
Parish	#	%	#	%	#	%	#	%	#	%	Total votes cast
Acadia	3,497	52.37%	2,382	35.67%	784	11.74%	14	0.21%	1,115	16.70%	6,678 (Note: One write-in vote was recorded from this parish.)
Allen	980	30.44%	1,996	62.01%	241	7.49%	2	0.06%	-1,016	-31.57%	3,219
Ascension	1,420	47.60%	1,126	37.75%	433	14.52%	4	0.13%	294	9.85%	2,983
Assumption	1,000	54.53%	362	19.74%	469	25.57%	3	0.16%	531 (Note: In this parish where Truman ran third behind Thurmond and Dewey, margin given is Dewey vote minus Thurmond vote and percentage margin Dewey percentage minus Thurmond percentage.)	28.96%	1,834
Avoyelles	5,417	76.24%	1,356	19.09%	285	4.01%	44	0.62%	4,061	57.15%	7,105 (Note: 3 write-in votes were recorded from this parish)
Beauregard	1,365	39.30%	1,653	47.60%	449	12.93%	6	0.17%	-288	-8.30%	3,473
Bienville	2,362	79.34%	421	14.14%	191	6.42%	3	0.10%	1,941	65.20%	2,977
Bossier	2,390	61.66%	1,147	29.59%	338	8.72%	1	0.03%	1,243	32.07%	3,876
Caddo	11,292	51.06%	5,985	27.06%	4,777	21.60%	63	0.28%	5,307	24.00%	22,117
Calcasieu	3,400	27.34%	7,074	56.87%	1,940	15.60%	24	0.19%	-3,674	-29.53%	12,438
Caldwell	818	46.80%	777	44.45%	151	8.64%	2	0.11%	41	2.35%	1,748
Cameron	293	26.09%	742	66.07%	87	7.75%	1	0.09%	-449	-39.98%	1,123
Catahoula	1,062	63.75%	515	30.91%	86	5.16%	3	0.18%	547	32.84%	1,666
Claiborne	2,061	73.98%	457	16.40%	265	9.51%	3	0.11%	1,604	57.58%	2,786
Concordia	1,140	72.75%	329	21.00%	98	6.25%	0	0.00%	811	51.75%	1,567
DeSoto	1,889	68.00%	617	22.21%	270	9.72%	2	0.07%	1,272	45.79%	2,778
East Baton Rouge	8,166	38.05%	8,560	39.88%	4,585	21.36%	153	0.71%	-394	-1.83%	21,464
East Carroll	663	60.05%	323	29.26%	116	10.51%	2	0.18%	340	30.79%	1,104
East Feliciana	839	67.99%	267	21.64%	127	10.29%	1	0.08%	572	46.35%	1,234
Evangeline	4,415	76.48%	1,149	19.90%	206	3.57%	3	0.05%	3,266	56.58%	5,773
Franklin	1,872	48.19%	1,857	47.80%	149	3.84%	7	0.18%	15	0.39%	3,885
Grant	1,439	50.67%	1,120	39.44%	273	9.61%	8	0.28%	319	11.23%	2,840
Iberia	2,224	36.12%	1,015	16.49%	2,910	47.26%	8	0.13%	-686	-11.14%	6,157
Iberville	856	27.91%	1,697	55.33%	506	16.50%	8	0.26%	-841	-27.42%	3,067
Jackson	1,400	61.16%	713	31.15%	169	7.38%	7	0.31%	687	30.01%	2,289
Jefferson	8,822	54.56%	4,654	28.79%	2,620	16.20%	72	0.45%	4,168	25.77%	16,168
Jefferson Davis	1,122	30.82%	1,717	47.16%	793	21.78%	9	0.25%	-595	-16.34%	3,641
Lafayette	3,724	49.01%	1,787	23.52%	2,068	27.21%	20	0.26%	1,656	21.80%	7,599
Lafourche	3,052	51.62%	1,586	26.82%	1,247	21.09%	28	0.47%	1,466	24.80%	5,913
LaSalle	1,767	64.23%	716	26.03%	266	9.67%	2	0.07%	1,051	38.20%	2,751
Lincoln	2,196	68.60%	625	19.53%	353	11.03%	27	0.84%	1,571	49.07%	3,201
Livingston	1,351	38.92%	1,841	53.04%	264	7.61%	15	0.43%	-490	-14.12%	3,471
Madison	1,033	75.62%	197	14.42%	127	9.30%	9	0.66%	836	61.20%	1,366
Morehouse	1,391	49.43%	1,177	41.83%	242	8.60%	4	0.14%	214	7.60%	2,814
Natchitoches	2,887	53.94%	1,692	31.61%	763	14.26%	10	0.19%	1,195	22.33%	5,352
Orleans	50,234	40.58%	41,900	33.85%	29,442	23.78%	2,203	1.78%	8,334	6.73%	123,785 (Note: 6 write-in votes were recorded from this parish.)
Ouachita	4,848	44.88%	4,213	39.00%	1,729	16.01%	12	0.11%	635	5.88%	10,802
Plaquemines	2,597	93.62%	77	2.78%	90	3.24%	10	0.36%	2,507	90.38%	2,774
Pointe Coupee	1,375	69.48%	402	20.31%	198	10.01%	4	0.20%	973	49.17%	1,979
Rapides	6,581	50.39%	4,730	36.22%	1,707	13.07%	42	0.32%	1,851	14.17%	13,060
Red River	1,535	72.89%	452	21.46%	113	5.37%	6	0.28%	1,083	51.43%	2,106
Richland	1,448	57.12%	960	37.87%	119	4.69%	8	0.32%	488	19.25%	2,535
Sabine	2,249	54.51%	1,405	34.05%	469	11.37%	3	0.07%	844	20.46%	4,126
St. Bernard	2,242	91.70%	91	3.72%	107	4.38%	5	0.20%	2,135	87.32%	2,445
St. Charles	1,206	50.04%	914	37.93%	286	11.87%	4	0.17%	292	12.11%	2,410
St. Helena	662	55.58%	469	39.38%	59	4.95%	1	0.08%	193	16.20%	1,191
St. James	800	37.79%	859	40.58%	453	21.40%	5	0.24%	-59	-2.79%	2,117
St. John the Baptist	695	36.97%	799	42.50%	379	20.16%	7	0.37%	-104	-5.53%	1,880
St. Landry	5,730	73.96%	1,179	15.22%	829	10.70%	9	0.12%	4,551	58.74%	7,747
St. Martin	2,822	73.80%	307	8.03%	688	17.99%	7	0.18%	2,134	55.81%	3,824
St. Mary	1,751	49.99%	918	26.21%	824	23.52%	10	0.29%	833	23.78%	3,503
St. Tammany	3,063	60.76%	1,164	23.09%	790	15.67%	24	0.48%	1,899	37.67%	5,041
Tangipahoa	3,919	52.90%	2,184	29.48%	1,287	17.37%	18	0.24%	1,735	23.42%	7,408
Tensas	732	70.05%	239	22.87%	72	6.89%	2	0.19%	493	47.18%	1,045
Terrebonne	2,011	46.40%	1,262	29.12%	1,048	24.18%	13	0.30%	749	17.28%	4,334
Union	1,872	65.50%	724	25.33%	259	9.06%	3	0.10%	1,148	40.17%	2,858
Vermilion	3,236	51.69%	1,806	28.85%	1,212	19.36%	7	0.11%	1,430	22.84%	6,261
Vernon	2,331	50.87%	1,939	42.32%	296	6.46%	16	0.35%	392	8.55%	4,582
Washington	4,141	53.08%	3,267	41.88%	371	4.76%	22	0.28%	874	11.20%	7,801
Webster	2,895	54.72%	1,933	36.53%	455	8.60%	8	0.15%	962	18.19%	5,291
West Baton Rouge	466	39.93%	557	47.73%	141	12.08%	3	0.26%	-91	-7.80%	1,167
West Carroll	1,221	53.16%	921	40.10%	151	6.57%	4	0.17%	300	13.06%	2,297
West Feliciana	377	64.78%	101	17.35%	102	17.53%	2	0.34%	275	47.25%	582
Winn	1,648	56.25%	940	32.08%	333	11.37%	9	0.31%	708	24.17%	2,930
Totals	204,290	49.07%	136,344	32.75%	72,657	17.45%	3,035	0.73%	67,946	16.32%	416,336

==== Parishes that flipped from Democratic to Dixiecrat ====
- Bienville
- Bossier
- Caddo
- Claiborne
- DeSoto
- Lafayette
- Lincoln
- Madison
- Plaquemines
- St. Bernard
- St. Mary
- St. Landry
- Tensas
- West Feliciana
- Acadia
- Ascension
- Assumption
- Avoyelles
- Caldwell
- Catahoula
- Concordia
- East Carroll
- East Feliciana
- Evangeline
- Franklin
- Grant
- Jackson
- Jefferson
- LaSalle
- Lafourche
- Morehouse
- Natchitoches
- Orleans
- Ouachita
- Pointe Coupee
- Red River
- Rapides
- Richland
- Sabine
- St. Charles
- St. Helena
- St. Martin
- Tangipahoa
- Union
- Vermilion
- Terrebonne
- Vernon
- Washington
- Webster
- Winn
- West Carroll

==== Parishes that flipped from Democratic to Republican ====
- Iberia

== See also ==
- United States presidential elections in Louisiana

== Works cited ==
- Black, Earl; Black, Merle (1992). The Vital South: How Presidents Are Elected. Harvard University Press. ISBN 0674941306.
