= Florence, Louisiana =

Unincorporated community in Louisiana

- Unincorporated community
- Location within Louisiana Location within the United States
- Coordinates: 29°47′16″N 91°43′25″W
- Country: United States
- State: Louisiana
- Parish: St. Mary
- Elevation: 3 ft (0.91 m)
- Time zone: UTC-6 (Central (CST))
  - Summer (DST): UTC-5 (CDT)
- ZIP code: 70538
- Area code: 337
- GNIS feature ID: 560766
- FIPS code: 22-25790

Florence is an unincorporated community in St. Mary Parish, Louisiana, United States. The community is located less than 3 miles (4.8 kilometres) west of Glencoe and 8 miles (13 kilometres) southeast of Jeanerette.
