= Iberia Parish, Louisiana =

Parish in Louisiana, United States

Iberia Parish
- Parish
- Parish of Iberia; Paroisse de l'Ibérie (French); Parroquia de Iberia (Spanish)
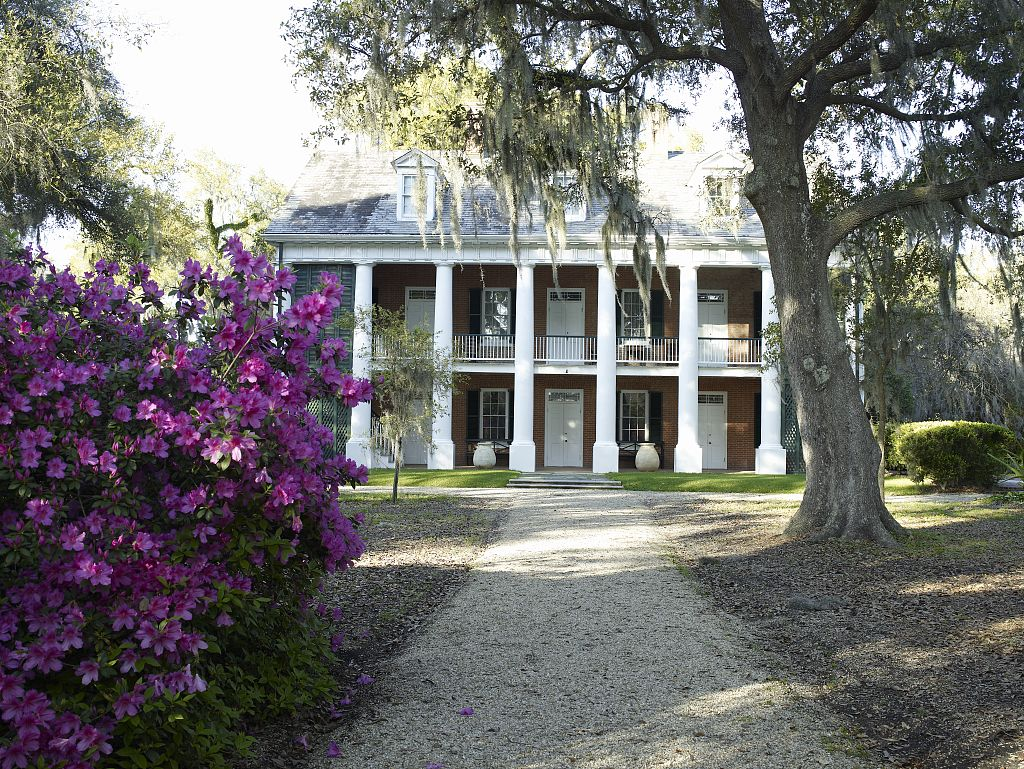
- Historic House and Garden Shadows-on-the-Teche

- Seal

- Location within the U.S. state of Louisiana
- Coordinates: 29°47′N 91°47′W
- Country: United States
- State: Louisiana
- Founded: October 30, 1868
- Named for: Iberia
- Seat: New Iberia
- Largest city: New Iberia

Area
  - Total: 1,031 sq mi (2,670 km^{2})
  - Land: 574 sq mi (1,490 km^{2})
  - Water: 456 sq mi (1,180 km^{2}) 44%

Population (2020)
  - Total: 69,929
  - Estimate (2025): 66,846 ▼
  - Density: 122/sq mi (47.0/km^{2})
- Time zone: UTC−6 (Central)
  - Summer (DST): UTC−5 (CDT)
- Congressional district: 3rd
- Website: iberiaparishgovernment.com

Iberia Parish (French: Paroisse de l'Ibérie, Spanish: Parroquia de Iberia) is a parish located in the U.S. state of Louisiana. At the 2020 census, it had a population of 69,929; the parish seat is New Iberia.

The parish was formed in 1868 during the Reconstruction era and named for Iberia. It is part of the 22-parish Acadiana region of the state, with a large Francophone population. Some of its ethnic French residents had ancestors who settled here after being expelled in the 18th century by the British from Acadia in present-day Canada. Historically, it has also been a center for sugarcane cultivation and produces the most sugar of any parish in the state.

Iberia Parish is part of the Lafayette metropolitan area. The Port of Iberia has a waterway with access to the Gulf Coast.

== History ==
Iberia Parish was created from parts of St. Martin Parish and St. Mary Parish in 1868. It was part of an effort by the Reconstruction-era government to create parishes that would have large Republican-majority populations, composed primarily of freedmen in those years.

This territory was part of the sugar parishes, where sugarcane plantations were developed along the waterways before and after the Civil War, dependent on labor of high numbers of enslaved African Americans before the war. Sugarcane was a lucrative commodity crop for planters. Relations between White and Black people were troubled after the Civil War, as White people sought to dominate freedmen, by violence and intimidation if necessary.

The period after the Reconstruction era was one of increasing violence, especially at the turn of the century and into the early 20th century. In this period, the highly populated Iberia Parish had 26 lynchings of Black people by the KKK, as part of racial terrorism. This was the fifth-highest total of any parish in Louisiana, and tied with the total number of lynchings in Bossier Parish.

Political factionalism was intense in Louisiana; Iberia Parish had factions split among conservatives and those who were more moderate about the status of Black people. Moderates sometimes allied with the Republican creoles and White people in the parish. In 1884, though, White Democrats murdered more than 20 African Americans (most of the total noted above), in a kind of political lynching, and arrested White Republicans to regain power in Iberia Parish. In contrast to northern Louisiana, residents otherwise seemed to rely more on the formal legal system, with fewer mob lynchings, but Black people suffered here, making up 88% of the people legally executed for violent crimes in the late 19th century.

In the late 19th century, labor shortages often occurred on the sugarcane plantations. Planters recruited thousands of Italian immigrants as temporary laborers, many Sicilians who had first settled in New Orleans. They were needed during the fall harvest and processing season, which extended from October to January. The Italians became part of the volatility of social relations, struggling to make their way between planters and Black workers, and competing with other workers for jobs.

The parish economy changed markedly in the 20th century after the discovery of oil. The Port of Iberia was developed into an industrial center. New types of jobs became available for African Americans.

It is also known for being where the body of Quawan Charles was found. The circumstances are under investigation, but the coroner reportedly said that the cause of his death was drowning.

== Geography ==
According to the U.S. Census Bureau, the parish has a total area of 1,031 square miles (2,670 km^{2}), of which 456 square miles (1,180 km^{2}) (44%) are covered by water. This includes Marsh Island.

=== Major highways ===
- Future Interstate 49
- U.S. Highway 90
- Louisiana Highway 14
- Louisiana Highway 31
- Louisiana Highway 83
- Louisiana Highway 85
- Louisiana Highway 86
- Louisiana Highway 87
- Louisiana Highway 88
- Louisiana Highway 182
- Louisiana Highway 320
- Louisiana Highway 329
- Louisiana Highway 330
- Louisiana Highway 344
- Louisiana Highway 345
- Louisiana Highway 347
- Louisiana Highway 668
- Louisiana Highway 671
- Louisiana Highway 673
- Louisiana Highway 674
- Louisiana Highway 675
- Louisiana Highway 676
- Louisiana Highway 677
- Louisiana Highway 679
- Louisiana Highway 680
- Louisiana Highway 682
- Louisiana Highway 997
- Louisiana Highway 3156
- Louisiana Highway 3182
- Louisiana Highway 3195
- Louisiana Highway 3212
- Louisiana Highway 3242

=== Adjacent parishes ===
- St. Martin Parish (north, south)
- Iberville Parish (northeast)
- Assumption Parish (east)
- St. Mary Parish (southeast)
- Vermilion Parish (west)
- Lafayette Parish (northwest)

== Protected areas ==
The parish has both national and state protected areas within its borders.

=== National protected area ===
- Shell Keys National Wildlife Refuge

=== State protected areas ===
Part of the Attakapas Wildlife Management Area is located within Iberia Parish, as well as in St. Mary and St. Martin parishes.

== Communities ==
=== Cities ===
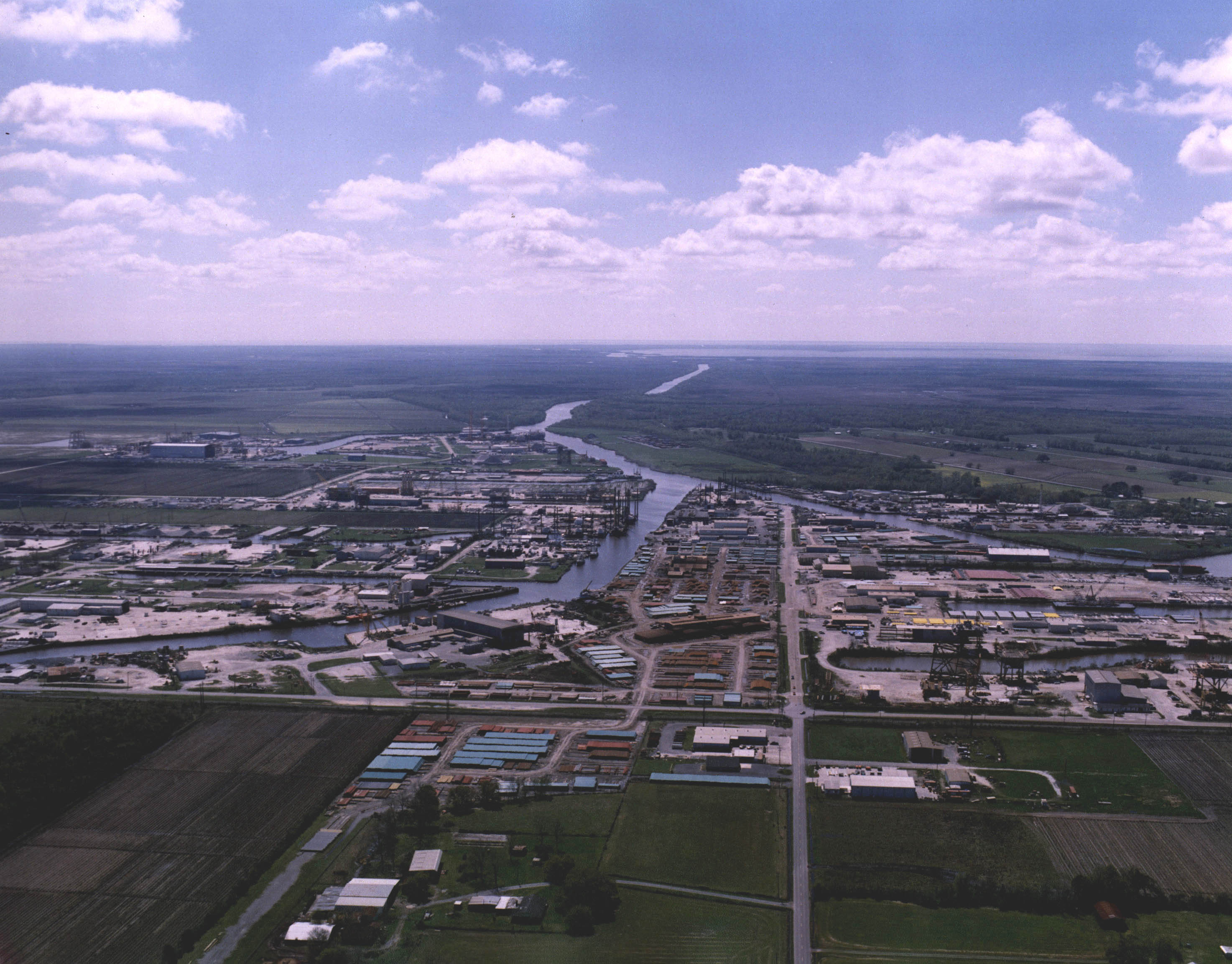
NOAA aerial photo of the Port of Iberia

- Jeanerette
- New Iberia (parish seat and largest municipality)

=== Town ===
- Delcambre (part)

=== Village ===
- Loreauville

=== Census-designated place ===
- Lydia

=== Unincorporated communities ===
- Avery Island
- Bob Acres
- Emma
- Jefferson Island
- Olivier
- Rynella
- Weeks

== Demographics ==
Historical population
Census	Pop.	Note	%±
1870	9,042		—
1880	16,676		84.4%
1890	20,997		25.9%
1900	29,015		38.2%
1910	31,262		7.7%
1920	26,855		−14.1%
1930	28,192		5.0%
1940	37,183		31.9%
1950	40,059		7.7%
1960	51,657		29.0%
1970	57,397		11.1%
1980	63,752		11.1%
1990	68,297		7.1%
2000	73,266		7.3%
2010	73,240		0.0%
2020	69,929		−4.5%
2025 (est.)	66,846	▼	−4.4%
U.S. Decennial Census; 1790-1960 1900-1990; 1990-2000 2010-2013

Iberia Parish, Louisiana – Racial and ethnic composition Note: the US Census treats Hispanic/Latino as an ethnic category. This table excludes Latinos from the racial categories and assigns them to a separate category. Hispanics/Latinos may be of any race.
Race / Ethnicity (NH = Non-Hispanic)	Pop 1980	Pop 1990	Pop 2000	Pop 2010	Pop 2020	% 1980	% 1990	% 2000	% 2010	% 2020
White alone (NH)	43,765	46,078	47,122	44,502	38,572	68.65%	67.47%	64.32%	60.76%	55.16%
Black or African American alone (NH)	17,395	19,966	22,451	23,280	22,984	27.29%	29.23%	30.64%	31.79%	32.87%
Native American or Alaska Native alone (NH)	100	122	216	252	247	0.16%	0.18%	0.29%	0.34%	0.35%
Asian alone (NH)	97	737	1,401	1,745	1,933	0.15%	1.08%	1.91%	2.38%	2.76%
Native Hawaiian or Pacific Islander alone (NH)	x	x	15	18	3	x	x	0.02%	0.02%	0.00%
Other race alone (NH)	64	74	143	146	227	0.10%	0.11%	0.20%	0.20%	0.32%
Mixed race or Multiracial (NH)	x	x	817	998	2,066	x	x	1.12%	1.36%	2.95%
Hispanic or Latino (any race)	2,331	1,320	1,101	2,299	3,897	3.66%	1.93%	1.50%	3.14%	5.57%
Total	63,752	68,297	73,266	73,240	69,929	100.00%	100.00%	100.00%	100.00%	100.00%

As of the 2020 United States census, 69,929 people, 26,185 households, and 20,409 families were residing in the parish. The 2019 American Community Survey estimated 69,830 people lived in Iberia Parish. About 25.6% of the population were under 18 and 51.1% were female. At the 2000 census, 73,266 people, 25,381 households, and 19,162 families were living in the parish. The population density was 127 people per square mile (49 people/km^{2}). The 27,844 housing units had an average density of 48 per square mile (19/km^{2}).

In the 25,381 households, 39.5% had children under 18 living with them, 53.2% were married couples living together, 17.2% had a female householder with no husband present, and 24.5% were not families. About 21.1% of all households were made up of individuals, and 8.7% had someone living alone who was 65 or older. The average household size was 2.82, and the average family size was 3.28.

In the parish, the age distribution was 30.0% under 18, 9.6% from 18 to 24, 28.4% from 25 to 44, 20.6% from 45 to 64, and 11.4% who were 65 or older. The median age was 33 years. For every 100 females, there were 92.8 males. For every 100 females 18 and over, there were 89.8 males in 2000.

In 2019, the parish had a median income $48,861 and mean income of $23,290. An estimated 21.9% of the parish population lived at or below the poverty line. The median income for a household in the parish was $31,204 and for a family was $36,017 in 2000. Males had a median income of $32,399 versus $18,174 for females. The per capita income for the parish was $14,145. About 20.2% of families and 23.6% of the population were below the poverty line, including 31.5% of those under 18 and 20.2% of those 65 or over.

At the 2000 census, the racial makeup of the parish was 65.08% White, 30.81% Black or African American, 0.31% Native American, 1.93% Asian, 0.02% Pacific Islander, 0.60% from other races, and 1.25% from two or more races. About 1.50% of the population were Hispanics or Latinos of any race. Of the population, 11.99% reported speaking French or Cajun French at home, while 1.48% spoke Lao and 1.29% Spanish. The 2019 census estimated that 58.6% of the population was non-Hispanic White, 32.8% Black or African American, 0.6% American Indian or Alaska Native, 2.7% Asian, 0.1% Pacific Islander, 1.9% multiracial, and 4.3% Hispanic or Latin American of any race.

== Education ==
Iberia Parish School System serves the parish.

Iberia Parish also has several private schools: Catholic High New Iberia (of the Roman Catholic Diocese of Lafayette in Louisiana), Acadiana Christian School, and Highland Baptist School.

Iberia Parish is in the service area of Fletcher Technical Community College and South Louisiana Community College.

== National Guard ==
E Company 199th Forward Support Battalion is stationed in Jeanerette, Louisiana, and B Company 2-156th is stationed in New Iberia, Louisiana. Both units have deployed twice to Iraq, 2004-5 and 2010, as part of the 256TH IBCT.

== Politics ==
United States presidential election results for Iberia Parish, Louisiana
Year	Republican		Democratic		Third party(ies)	
Year	No.	%	No.	%	No.	%
1912	222	17.13%	666	51.39%	408	31.48%
1916	134	7.50%	802	44.90%	850	47.59%
1920	1,275	74.43%	438	25.57%	0	0.00%
1924	679	47.85%	740	52.15%	0	0.00%
1928	413	13.89%	2,561	86.11%	0	0.00%
1932	798	24.86%	2,412	75.14%	0	0.00%
1936	1,234	32.23%	2,595	67.77%	0	0.00%
1940	1,706	29.43%	4,091	70.57%	0	0.00%
1944	1,141	23.76%	3,661	76.24%	0	0.00%
1948	2,910	47.26%	1,015	16.49%	2,232	36.25%
1952	5,669	58.39%	4,040	41.61%	0	0.00%
1956	6,733	63.43%	3,544	33.39%	338	3.18%
1960	3,551	22.95%	9,235	59.70%	2,684	17.35%
1964	8,196	50.17%	8,141	49.83%	0	0.00%
1968	5,448	28.63%	5,510	28.96%	8,071	42.41%
1972	11,812	65.84%	5,143	28.67%	985	5.49%
1976	10,392	50.07%	9,984	48.11%	377	1.82%
1980	14,273	57.03%	9,681	38.68%	1,074	4.29%
1984	17,727	62.14%	10,170	35.65%	629	2.21%
1988	15,438	54.49%	12,166	42.94%	727	2.57%
1992	11,905	38.99%	13,040	42.71%	5,585	18.29%
1996	12,014	40.09%	15,087	50.35%	2,864	9.56%
2000	17,236	57.42%	11,762	39.18%	1,022	3.40%
2004	19,420	60.17%	12,426	38.50%	427	1.32%
2008	20,127	60.68%	12,492	37.66%	549	1.66%
2012	20,892	62.56%	12,132	36.33%	373	1.12%
2016	20,903	64.41%	10,698	32.96%	853	2.63%
2020	21,251	64.96%	11,027	33.71%	435	1.33%
2024	19,511	66.52%	9,504	32.40%	316	1.08%

== See also ==
- National Register of Historic Places listings in Iberia Parish, Louisiana
- Iberia African American Historical Society
