= Rynella, Louisiana =

Unincorporated community in Louisiana

- Unincorporated community
- Location within Louisiana Location within the United States
- Coordinates: 29°56′48″N 91°52′33″W
- Country: United States
- State: Louisiana
- Parish: Iberia
- Elevation: 7 ft (2.1 m)
- Time zone: UTC-6 (Central (CST))
  - Summer (DST): UTC-5 (CDT)
- ZIP code: 70560
- Area code: 337
- GNIS feature ID: 543633
- FIPS code: 22-66716

Rynella is an unincorporated community in Iberia Parish, Louisiana, United States. The community is located 5 miles (8.0 kilometres) west of Lydia, 5 miles (8.0 kilometres) southwest of New Iberia and 3 miles (4.8 kilometres) northeast of Avery Island.

== History ==
The community consists of a few residential dwellings and a volunteer fire department along Highway 329 (also known as the Avery Island Highway). The name Rynella allegedly is a portmanteau deriving from the last two letters of the first names of three local women, RosemaRY, PauliNE, and LeiLA McIlhenny (someone eventually adding an extra L to the resulting word). They were daughters of Edward Avery McIlhenny, a noted Louisiana conservationist who presided over McIlhenny Company, maker of Tabasco brand pepper sauce at nearby Avery Island. The McIlhenny family operated a general store at Rynella and he owned much of the land that now comprises and surrounds the community.
