= Emma, Louisiana =

- Unincorporated community
- Location within Louisiana Location within the United States
- Coordinates: 29°56′19″N 91°53′8″W
- Country: United States
- State: Louisiana
- Parish: Iberia
- Elevation: 3 ft (0.91 m)
- Time zone: Central (CST)

Emma is an unincorporated community located in Iberia Parish, Louisiana, United States. This mostly rural community is located 6.3 miles away from New Iberia.
