= 2008 United States presidential election in Louisiana =

- November 4, 2008

Nominee	John McCain	Barack Obama
Party	Republican	Democratic
Home state	Arizona	Illinois
Running mate	Sarah Palin	Joe Biden
Electoral vote	9	0
Popular vote	1,148,275	782,989
Percentage	58.56%	39.93%

McCain
40–50%
50–60%
60–70%
70–80%
80–90%
90–100%
Obama
40–50%
50–60%
60–70%
70–80%
80–90%
90–100%
President before election
George W. Bush
Republican
Elected President
Barack Obama
Democratic

The 2008 United States presidential election in Louisiana took place on November 4, 2008, was part of the 2008 United States presidential election. Voters chose nine representatives, or electors to the Electoral College, who voted for president and vice president.

Louisiana was won by Republican nominee John McCain by an 18.6% margin of victory. Prior to the election, all leading news organizations considered this a state McCain would win, or otherwise a "red state". Although Bill Clinton carried the state twice, it has since shifted strongly toward the Republican Party. This is despite having one of the largest percentages of African Americans in the country, one of the Democratic Party's most reliable voting blocs and which gave record-breaking support to Obama, the first African American on a major-party presidential ticket. Its shift to the right has been due almost entirely to its white population, which has become overwhelmingly Republican in the 21st century. It was one of five states to swing Republican from 2004, along with West Virginia, Tennessee, Oklahoma, and Arkansas. This marked the first time that Louisiana failed to back the winning candidate since 1968, when it voted for a third-party candidate George Wallace. In doing so, Obama became the first winning Democratic presidential nominee to lose Louisiana since Lyndon B. Johnson in 1964. He was the first Democrat to ever win without Calcasieu Parish since the parish's founding in 1840.

In this election, Louisiana voted 25.9% to the right of the nation at-large, or a 13.85 percent bigger differential than in 2004. This was the first time since 1988 that either major party won Louisiana in more than two consecutive presidential races.

== Primaries ==
- 2008 Louisiana Democratic presidential primary
- 2008 Louisiana Republican presidential caucuses and primary

== Campaign ==
=== Predictions ===
There were 16 news organizations who made state-by-state predictions of the election. Here are their last predictions before election day:

Source	Ranking
D.C. Political Report	Likely R
Cook Political Report	Solid R
The Takeaway	Solid R
Electoral-vote.com	Solid R
Washington Post	Solid R
Politico	Solid R
RealClearPolitics	Solid R
FiveThirtyEight	Solid R
CQ Politics	Solid R
The New York Times	Solid R
CNN	Safe R
NPR	Solid R
MSNBC	Solid R
Fox News	Likely R
Associated Press	Likely R
Rasmussen Reports	Safe R

=== Polling ===
McCain won every pre-election poll. The final 3 polls averaged McCain leading 50% to 40%.

=== Fundraising ===
John McCain raised a total of $2,175,416 in the state. Barack Obama raised $1,438,276.

=== Advertising and visits ===
Obama spent $368,039. McCain and his interest groups spent $6,019. McCain visited the state once, in New Orleans.

== Analysis ==
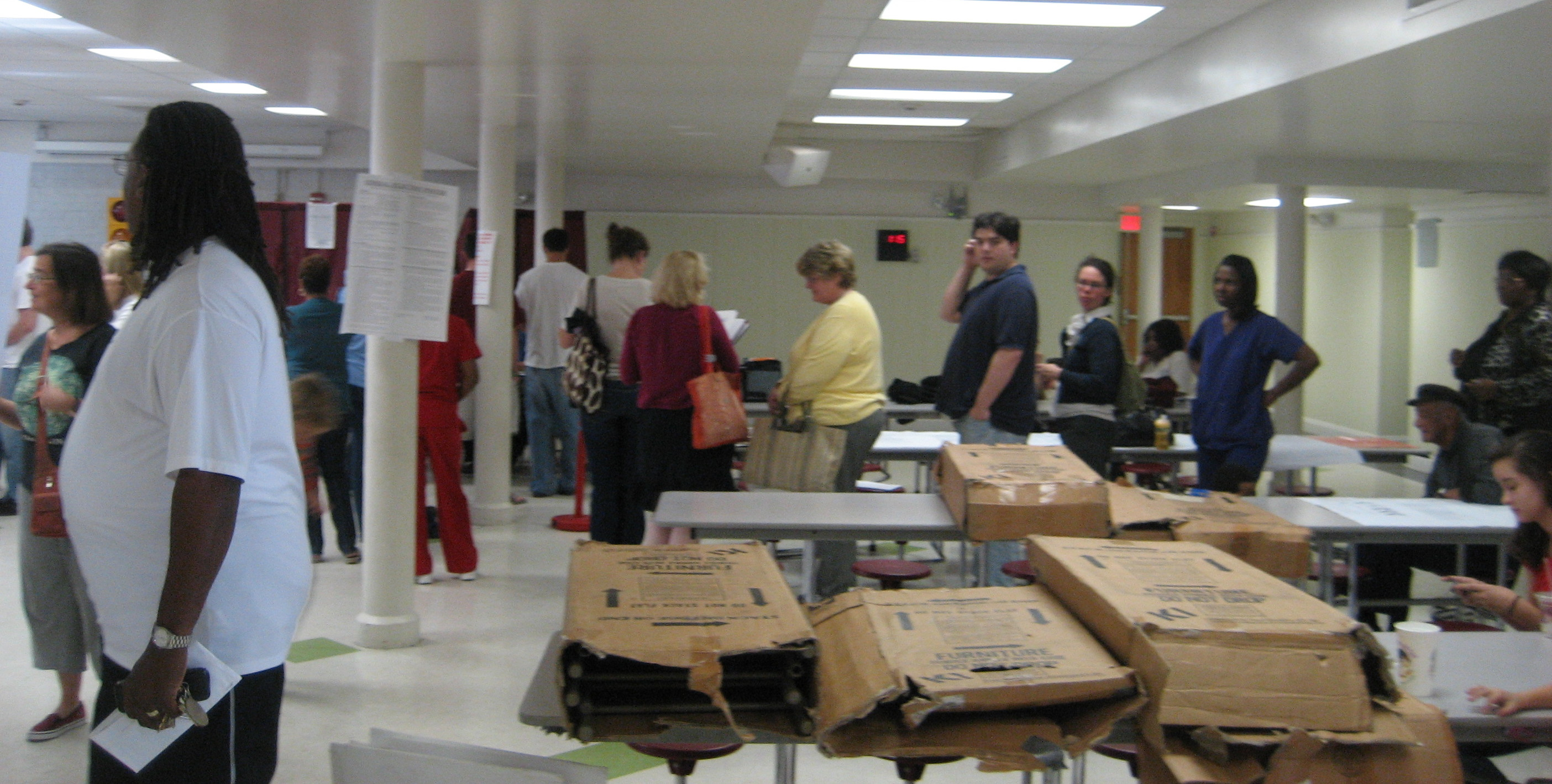
Voters wait in queue at a polling station in New Orleans

Polling in Louisiana gave a strong lead to McCain, sometimes as high as 19%, and Barack Obama did not seriously contest the state. Governor Bobby Jindal endorsed McCain early on in the primary season. Louisiana was also one of only two states to list Ron Paul on their official ballot (the other being Montana which gave the largest percentage to any third-party candidate nationwide). This was the last time any parish flipped in the state in a presidential election until 2024.

At the same time, however, incumbent Democratic U.S. Senator Mary Landrieu avoided the Republican trend in the state and held onto her U.S. Senate seat, taking in 52.11% of the vote to State Treasurer John N. Kennedy, a Democrat who switched parties to run against Landrieu. Republicans picked up two U.S. House seats in Louisiana (LA-02 and LA-06 with Joseph Cao and Bill Cassidy, respectively).

== Results ==
2008 United States presidential election in Louisiana
Party	Candidate	Running mate	Votes	Percentage	Electoral votes
Republican	John McCain	Sarah Palin	1,148,275	58.56%	9
Democratic	Barack Obama	Joe Biden	782,989	39.93%	0
Louisiana Taxpayers	Ron Paul (no campaign)	Barry Goldwater Jr.	9,368	0.48%	0
Green	Cynthia McKinney	Rosa Clemente	9,187	0.47%	0
Independent	Ralph Nader	Matt Gonzalez	6,997	0.36%	0
Constitution	Chuck Baldwin	Darrell Castle	2,581	0.13%	0
Socialist Workers	James Harris	Alyson Kennedy	735	0.04%	0
Socialism and Liberation	Gloria La Riva	Eugene Puryear	354	0.02%	0
Prohibition	Gene Amondson	Leroy Pletten	275	0.01%	0
Totals			1,960,761	100.00%	9
Voter turnout (Voting age population)					62.0%

=== By parish ===
Parish	John McCain Republican		Barack Obama Democratic		Various candidates Other parties		Margin		Total
Parish	#	%	#	%	#	%	#	%	Total
Acadia	19,229	71.99%	7,028	26.31%	454	1.70%	12,201	45.68%	26,711
Allen	6,333	66.90%	2,891	30.54%	243	2.57%	3,442	36.36%	9,467
Ascension	31,239	67.08%	14,625	31.40%	707	1.52%	16,614	35.68%	46,571
Assumption	5,981	54.57%	4,756	43.39%	223	2.03%	1,225	11.18%	10,960
Avoyelles	10,236	60.43%	6,327	37.35%	375	2.21%	3,909	23.08%	16,938
Beauregard	10,718	76.15%	3,071	21.82%	285	2.03%	7,647	54.33%	14,074
Bienville	3,776	50.82%	3,589	48.30%	65	0.87%	187	2.52%	7,430
Bossier	32,713	71.37%	12,703	27.71%	419	0.91%	20,010	43.66%	45,835
Caddo	52,228	48.07%	55,536	51.11%	896	0.82%	-3,308	-3.04%	108,660
Calcasieu	50,449	61.43%	30,244	36.82%	1,438	1.75%	20,205	24.61%	82,131
Caldwell	3,696	75.54%	1,118	22.85%	79	1.61%	2,578	52.69%	4,893
Cameron	3,089	81.44%	613	16.16%	91	2.40%	2,476	65.28%	3,793
Catahoula	3,486	66.72%	1,659	31.75%	80	1.53%	1,827	34.97%	5,225
Claiborne	3,750	54.82%	3,025	44.22%	66	0.96%	725	10.60%	6,841
Concordia	5,668	59.49%	3,766	39.53%	93	0.98%	1,902	19.96%	9,527
DeSoto	6,883	56.16%	5,242	42.77%	132	1.08%	1,641	13.39%	12,257
East Baton Rouge	95,390	48.34%	99,652	50.50%	2,307	1.17%	-4,262	-2.16%	197,349
East Carroll	1,254	35.23%	2,267	63.70%	38	1.07%	-1,013	-28.47%	3,559
East Feliciana	5,432	54.61%	4,383	44.06%	132	1.33%	1,049	10.55%	9,947
Evangeline	9,793	61.30%	5,853	36.64%	330	2.07%	3,940	24.66%	15,976
Franklin	6,278	67.09%	2,961	31.64%	119	1.27%	3,317	35.45%	9,358
Grant	6,907	80.71%	1,474	17.22%	177	2.07%	5,433	63.49%	8,558
Iberia	20,127	60.68%	12,492	37.66%	549	1.66%	7,635	23.02%	33,168
Iberville	7,185	43.75%	9,023	54.95%	213	1.30%	-1,838	-11.20%	16,421
Jackson	5,190	67.09%	2,456	31.75%	90	1.16%	2,734	35.34%	7,736
Jefferson	113,191	62.50%	65,096	35.94%	2,833	1.56%	48,095	26.56%	181,120
Jefferson Davis	9,278	68.72%	3,923	29.06%	300	2.22%	5,355	39.66%	13,501
Lafayette	62,055	64.88%	32,145	33.61%	1,442	1.51%	29,910	31.27%	95,642
Lafourche	27,089	71.49%	9,662	25.50%	1,142	3.01%	17,427	45.99%	37,893
LaSalle	5,602	85.49%	860	13.12%	91	1.39%	4,742	72.37%	6,553
Lincoln	10,680	55.69%	8,292	43.23%	207	1.08%	2,388	12.46%	19,179
Livingston	43,269	85.02%	6,681	13.13%	942	1.85%	36,588	71.89%	50,892
Madison	2,152	40.60%	3,100	58.49%	48	0.91%	-948	-17.89%	5,300
Morehouse	7,258	54.98%	5,792	43.88%	150	1.14%	1,466	11.10%	13,200
Natchitoches	9,054	53.05%	7,801	45.71%	212	1.24%	1,253	7.34%	17,067
Orleans	28,130	19.08%	117,102	79.42%	2,207	1.50%	-88,972	-60.34%	147,439
Ouachita	41,741	62.07%	24,813	36.90%	690	1.03%	16,928	25.17%	67,244
Plaquemines	6,894	65.98%	3,380	32.35%	175	1.67%	3,514	33.63%	10,449
Pointe Coupee	6,702	53.90%	5,516	44.36%	217	1.75%	1,186	9.54%	12,435
Rapides	36,611	63.65%	20,127	34.99%	783	1.36%	16,484	28.66%	57,521
Red River	2,484	53.66%	2,080	44.93%	65	1.40%	404	8.73%	4,629
Richland	5,751	62.64%	3,311	36.06%	119	1.30%	2,440	26.58%	9,181
Sabine	7,226	74.87%	2,245	23.26%	181	1.88%	4,981	51.61%	9,652
St. Bernard	9,643	71.21%	3,491	25.78%	407	3.01%	6,152	45.43%	13,541
St. Charles	16,457	64.80%	8,522	33.56%	418	1.65%	7,935	31.24%	25,397
St. Helena	2,522	40.78%	3,567	57.68%	95	1.54%	-1,045	-16.90%	6,184
St. James	5,432	43.23%	6,994	55.67%	138	1.10%	-1,562	-12.44%	12,564
St. John the Baptist	8,912	41.15%	12,424	57.37%	320	1.48%	-3,512	-16.22%	21,656
St. Landry	21,650	50.95%	20,268	47.70%	575	1.35%	1,382	3.25%	42,493
St. Martin	14,443	59.55%	9,419	38.84%	390	1.61%	5,024	20.71%	24,252
St. Mary	13,183	57.56%	9,345	40.80%	375	1.64%	3,838	16.76%	22,903
St. Tammany	83,078	75.84%	24,596	22.45%	1,868	1.71%	58,482	53.39%	109,542
Tangipahoa	31,434	64.68%	16,438	33.82%	730	1.50%	14,996	30.86%	48,602
Tensas	1,367	44.97%	1,646	54.14%	27	0.89%	-279	-9.17%	3,040
Terrebonne	28,210	69.32%	11,581	28.46%	905	2.22%	16,629	40.86%	40,696
Union	7,619	70.10%	3,103	28.55%	146	1.34%	4,516	41.55%	10,868
Vermilion	18,069	72.76%	6,266	25.23%	498	2.01%	11,803	47.53%	24,833
Vernon	11,946	75.76%	3,534	22.41%	289	1.83%	8,412	53.35%	15,769
Washington	12,215	65.59%	6,122	32.87%	287	1.54%	6,093	32.72%	18,624
Webster	11,417	62.49%	6,610	36.18%	243	1.33%	4,807	26.31%	18,270
West Baton Rouge	6,654	56.08%	5,043	42.50%	169	1.42%	1,611	13.58%	11,866
West Carroll	4,045	81.11%	878	17.61%	64	1.28%	3,167	63.50%	4,987
West Feliciana	3,150	56.05%	2,415	42.97%	55	0.98%	735	13.08%	5,620
Winn	4,632	68.40%	2,047	30.23%	93	1.37%	2,585	38.17%	6,772
Totals	1,148,275	58.56%	782,989	39.93%	29,497	1.51%	365,286	18.63%	1,960,761

Parishes that flipped from Republican to Democratic

- Caddo (largest city: Shreveport)
- East Baton Rouge (largest city: Baton Rouge)

Parishes that flipped from Democratic to Republican

- Assumption (largest city: Napoleonville)
- Pointe Coupee (largest city: New Roads)

=== By congressional district ===
John McCain carried six of the state's seven congressional districts, both McCain and Obama won a district won by the other party.

District	McCain	Obama	Representative
1st	72.72%	25.68%	Bobby Jindal (110th Congress)
1st	72.72%	25.68%	Steve Scalise (111th Congress)
2nd	24.86%	74.13%	William J. Jefferson (110th Congress)
2nd	24.86%	74.13%	Joseph Cao (111th Congress)
3rd	60.99%	37.03%	Charles Melancon
4th	59.28%	39.57%	Jim McCrery (110th Congress)
4th	59.28%	39.57%	John C. Fleming (111th Congress)
5th	61.75%	36.96%	Rodney Alexander
6th	57.40%	41.26%	Don Cazayoux (110th Congress)
6th	57.40%	41.26%	Bill Cassidy (111th Congress)
7th	63.14%	35.20%	Charles Boustany

== Electors ==
Technically the voters of Louisiana cast their ballots for electors: representatives to the Electoral College. Louisiana is allocated 9 electors because it has 7 congressional districts and 2 senators. All candidates who appear on the ballot or qualify to receive write-in votes must submit a list of 9 electors, who pledge to vote for their candidate and their running mate. Whoever wins the majority of votes in the state is awarded all 9 electoral votes. Their chosen electors then vote for president and vice president. Although electors are pledged to their candidate and running mate, they are not obligated to vote for them. An elector who votes for someone other than their candidate is known as a faithless elector.

The electors of each state and the District of Columbia met on December 15, 2008, to cast their votes for president and vice president. The Electoral College itself never meets as one body. Instead the electors from each state and the District of Columbia met in their respective capitols.

The following were the members of the Electoral College from the state. All 9 were pledged to John McCain and Sarah Palin:

1. Lynn Skidmore
2. Joe Lavigne
3. Gordon Giles - He replaced Billy Nungesser, who was absent due to illness.
4. Alan Seabaugh
5. Karen Haymon
6. Charles Davis
7. Charlie Buckels
8. Dianne Christopher
9. Roger F. Villere Jr.

== See also ==
- United States presidential elections in Louisiana
- Presidency of Barack Obama
