= Mandalay National Wildlife Refuge =

National Wildlife Refuge in Louisiana

- IUCN category IV (habitat/species management area)
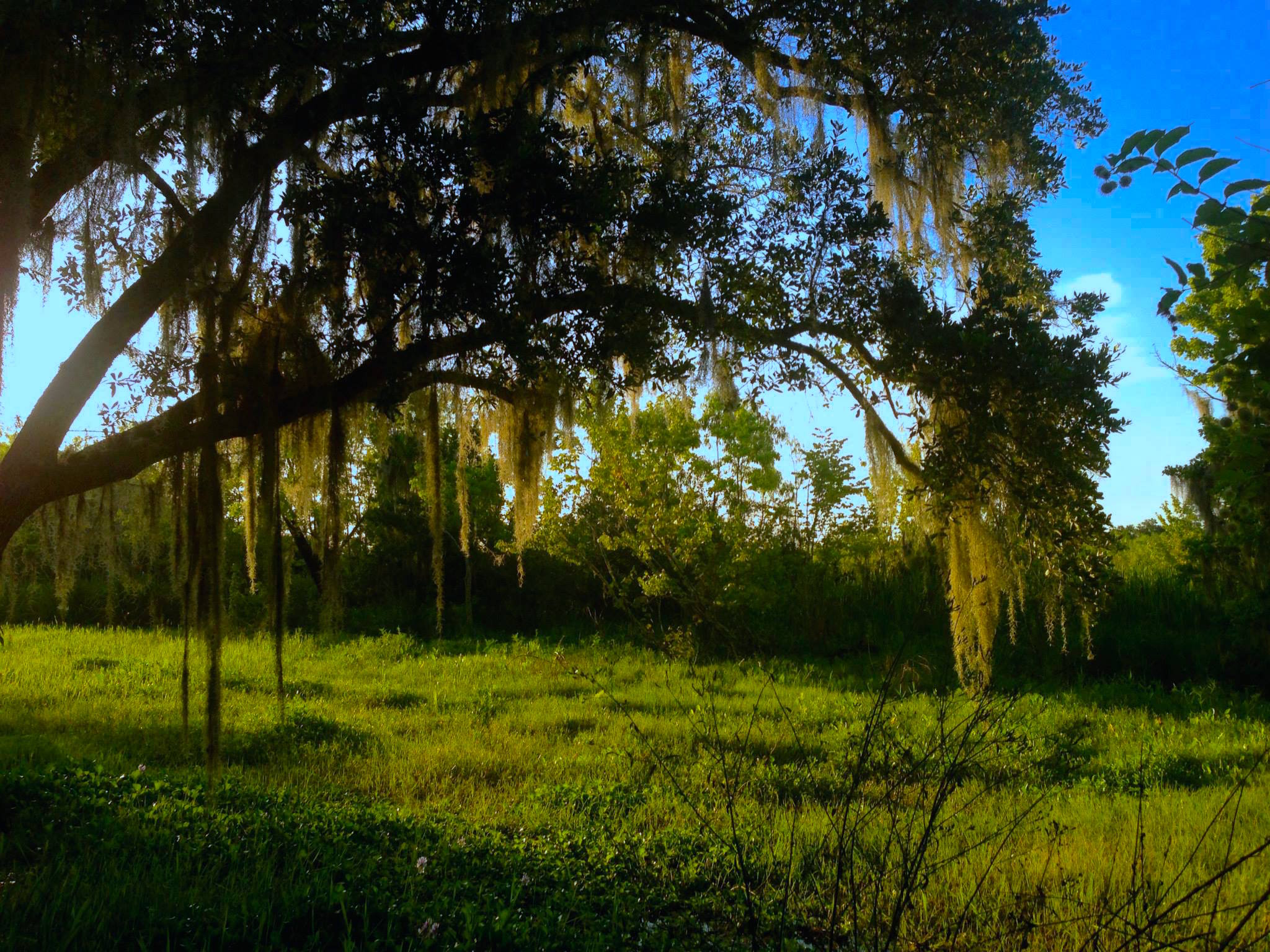

- Location within the United States
- Location: Terrebonne Parish, Louisiana
- Nearest city: Houma, Louisiana
- Coordinates: 29°31′30″N 90°48′15″W
- Area: 4,416 acres (17.87 km^{2})
- Established: 1996
- Governing body: U.S. Fish and Wildlife Service
- Website: Mandalay National Wildlife Refuge

Mandalay National Wildlife Refuge

Mandalay National Wildlife Refuge established in 1996, is located in Terrebonne Parish, 5 miles (8.0 km) southwest of Houma, Louisiana. It is one of eight refuges of the Southeast Louisiana National Wildlife Refuge Complex (SELA).

The 4,619-acre (18.69 km^{2}) refuge is composed of freshwater marsh and cypress-tupelo swamp. The refuge provides habitat for waterfowl, wading birds, and neotropical songbirds. Access is by boat only and foot travel is extremely difficult due to the soft marsh environment. The refuge is open year-round to the public from sunrise to sunset, with seasonal restrictions in some areas. Wildlife observation, boating and fishing are allowed on the refuge year round except in areas closed to public access. Hunting is permitted on the refuge in specific areas and under date, time, and lottery restrictions.

The Friends of Louisiana Wildlife Refuges is a non-profit, membership organization that supports and advocates for the SELA Refuges. They sponsor several of the refuge annual events, obtain grants to support refuge projects, conduct fund-raising activities to support environmental education programs and help the Fish and Wildlife Service operate and maintain the refuge facilities and programs by conducting weekend volunteer work days.

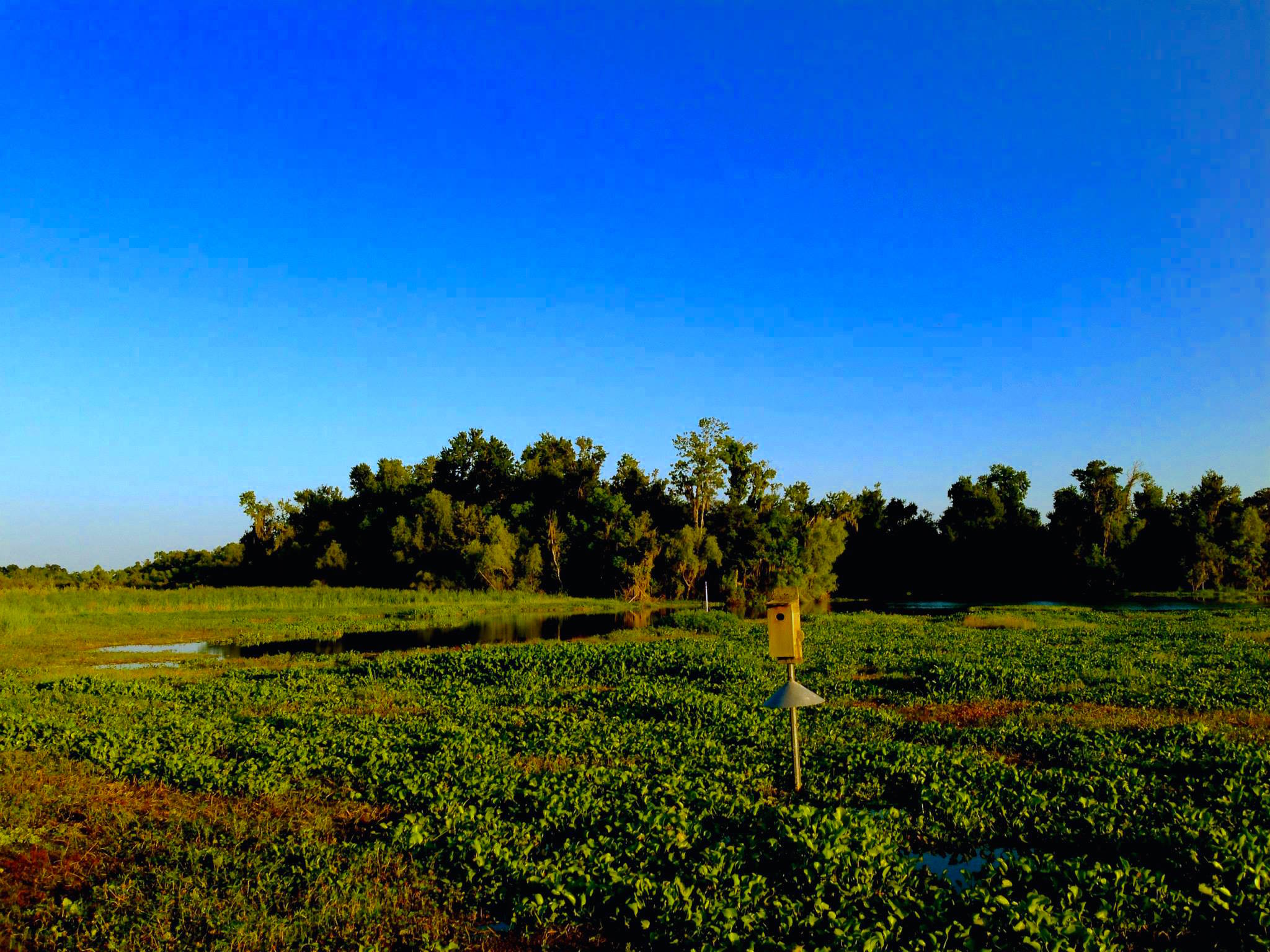
Mandalay NWR

== See also ==
- List of National Wildlife Refuges: Louisiana
