= Bayou Teche National Wildlife Refuge =

National Wildlife Refuge in St. Mary Parish, Louisiana

- IUCN category IV (habitat/species management area)
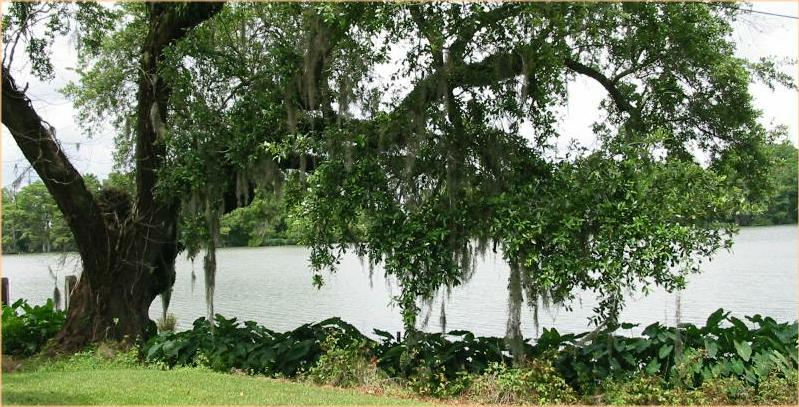
- Bayou Teche

- Location within Louisiana
- Location: St. Mary Parish, Louisiana
- Nearest city: Franklin, Louisiana
- Coordinates: 29.73994°N 91.47732°W
- Area: 9,028 acres (36.54 km^{2})
- Established: 2001
- Governing body: U.S. Fish and Wildlife Service
- Website: Bayou Teche National Wildlife Refuge

Bayou Teche National Wildlife Refuge

Bayou Teche National Wildlife Refuge is located in the coastal towns of Franklin, Garden City and Centerville on Bayou Teche in St. Mary Parish, Louisiana, United States. The 9,028-acre (36.54 km^{2}) refuge is forested with bottomland hardwoods and cypress-gum forests. The refuge was established in St. Mary Parish in 2001. The surrounding area includes oil and gas wells and canals.

== Wildlife and habitat ==
The endangered Louisiana black bear is relatively abundant throughout the refuge. Other wildlife species of interest include alligators, wading birds, ducks and bald eagles.

== See also ==
- List of National Wildlife Refuges: Louisiana
