= Gangsta Harmony =

Studio album by Mo B. Dick
- Released: April 13, 1999
- Recorded: 1996–99
- Studio: The Ice Cream Shop; Westlake Audio (Los Angeles, CA); The Village Recorder (Los Angeles, CA); Enterprise Studios in (Burbank, CA)
- Genre: Hip hop
- Length: 1:08:44
- Label: No Limit; Priority
- Producer: Master P (exec.); Beats By The Pound; Sons of Funk

Professional ratings
Review scores
Source	Rating
AllMusic	2.5/5 stars

Gangsta Harmony is the only solo studio album by American singer and record producer Mo B. Dick. It was released on April 13, 1999 through No Limit Records. Recording sessions took place at The Ice Cream Shop, at Westlake Audio and at The Village Recorder in Los Angeles, and at Enterprise Studios in Burbank, California. Production was handled by Beats By The Pound and Sons of Funk, with Master P serving as executive producer. It features guest appearances from C-Murder, Sons of Funk, Big Ed, Dolliolie, Fiend, KLC, Lil' Gotti, Magic, Mac, Mia X, Mr. Serv-On, O'Dell, Silkk the Shocker, Chub, Claude Achille, and Cool-Ass Alicis. The album peaked at number 66 on the Billboard 200 and number 16 on the Top R&B/Hip-Hop Albums only selling 31,000 copies in its first week. A music video for the single "Shoot' m up Movies" was released.

== Track listing ==
No.	Title	Writer(s)	Producer(s)	Length
1.	"Picture U & Me"	Raymond Emile Poole	Mo B. Dick	4:42
2.	"Station Identification" (featuring Claude Achille)	Poole	Mo B. Dick	0:39
3.	"Intercourse"	Poole; Carlos Stephens; Chub; Jonah Ellis; Lonnie Simmons; Alisa Yarbrough	Mo B. Dick; Carlos Stephens; O'Dell	4:28
4.	"U Got That Fire"	Poole	Mo B. Dick	4:00
5.	"Got 2 Git Mine" (featuring KLC)	Poole; Craig Stephen Lawson	Mo B. Dick	4:31
6.	"Mo B's Theme"	Poole; Adrian Belew; Chris Frantz; Steven Stanley; Tina Weymouth; Richard Walters; Douglas Davis; Marlon Williams; Nathaniel Wilson; Melvin Glover; Sylvia Robinson; Clifton "Jiggs" Chase	KLC	2:41
7.	"Part 3" (featuring C-Murder, Magic and Mia X)	Poole; James Brown; Fred Wesley, Jr.; Charles Bobbit		4:04
8.	"Twerk Some'm" (featuring Sons of Funk)	Poole; Desmond Mapp; Rico Crowder; Gregory E. Mapp; Joshua Lorenzo Chew	Mo B. Dick; Dez Dynamic	4:04
9.	"U Fell in Love w/a Gangster"	Poole	Mo B. Dick	6:03
10.	"What's on Your Mind?" (featuring Silkk the Shocker)	Poole; Vyshonn King Miller	Mo B. Dick	4:05
11.	"Shoot'm up Movies" (featuring Chub and Cool-Ass Alicis)	Poole; Kenny Nolan	Mo B. Dick	4:34
12.	"Smoke My Life Away"	Poole	Mo B. Dick	4:12
13.	"It's Alright" (featuring C-Murder)	Poole	Mo B. Dick	4:36
14.	"Want/Need" (featuring Mac)	Poole; McKinley Phipps, Jr.	Mo B. Dick	3:27
15.	"I'd Be a Fool" (featuring Fiend and Sons of Funk)	Poole; Richard Jones; D. Mapp; Crowder; G. Mapp; Chew	Sons of Funk	4:32
16.	"As the Ghetto Turns" (featuring Dolliolie)	Poole; Byron Dolliolie	Carlos Stephens	2:49
17.	"Could It B?"	Poole; Aldreamer Smith; Anita Thomas	Mo B. Dick	4:03
18.	"Leave Her Alone" (featuring Big Ed, Lil' Gotti, Mr. Serv-On and O'Dell)	Poole; Edward Lee Knight; Lawrence Johnson; Corey Smith	O'Dell	5:42
Total length:				1:08:44

== Charts ==
Chart (1999)	Peak position
US Billboard 200	66
US Top R&B Albums (Billboard)	16
