= 1964 United States presidential election in Louisiana =

- November 3, 1964

Nominee	Barry Goldwater	Lyndon B. Johnson
Party	Republican	Democratic
Home state	Arizona	Texas
Running mate	William E. Miller	Hubert Humphrey
Electoral vote	10	0
Popular vote	509,225	387,068
Percentage	56.81%	43.19%
Parish results
Goldwater
50–60%
60–70%
70–80%
80–90%
Johnson
50–60%
60–70%
70–80%
President before election
Lyndon B. Johnson
Democratic
Elected President
Lyndon B. Johnson
Democratic

The 1964 United States presidential election in Louisiana took place on November 3, 1964, as part of the 1964 United States presidential election. Louisiana voters chose ten representatives, or electors, to the Electoral College, who voted for president and vice president.

Louisiana was won by the Republican ticket of U.S. Senator Barry Goldwater, running with U.S. Representative William E. Miller, with 56.81% of the popular vote against the Democratic ticket of President Lyndon B. Johnson, running with U.S. Senator Hubert Humphrey. Johnson managed to hold onto the region of Acadiana (Cajun country). Louisiana was one of five states that swung more Republican in 1964, alongside Alabama, Mississippi, Georgia, and South Carolina.

== Campaign ==
Goldwater received 65% of the white vote.

As of the 2024 presidential election, this is the last in which Lafayette Parish voted for a Democratic presidential candidate.

== Results ==
1964 United States presidential election in Louisiana
Party	Candidate	Votes	%
Republican	Barry Goldwater	509,225	56.81%
Democratic	Lyndon B. Johnson (inc.)	387,068	43.19%
Total votes		896,293	100%

=== Results by parish ===
Parish	Barry Goldwater Republican		Lyndon B. Johnson Democratic		Margin		Total votes cast
Parish	#	%	#	%	#	%	Total votes cast
Acadia	6,706	41.47%	9,463	58.53%	-2,757	-17.06%	16,169
Allen	2,704	41.66%	3,787	58.34%	-1,083	-16.68%	6,491
Ascension	3,197	39.59%	4,879	60.41%	-1,682	-20.82%	8,076
Assumption	2,112	40.87%	3,056	59.13%	-944	-18.26%	5,168
Avoyelles	4,874	48.86%	5,102	51.14%	-228	-2.28%	9,976
Beauregard	3,349	52.34%	3,049	47.66%	300	4.68%	6,398
Bienville	3,740	81.39%	855	18.61%	2,885	62.78%	4,595
Bossier	9,822	83.53%	1,937	16.47%	7,885	67.06%	11,759
Caddo	42,197	80.60%	10,158	19.40%	32,039	61.20%	52,355
Calcasieu	17,046	42.27%	23,285	57.73%	-6,239	-15.46%	40,331
Caldwell	2,534	80.62%	609	19.38%	1,925	61.24%	3,143
Cameron	871	35.59%	1,576	64.41%	-705	-28.82%	2,447
Catahoula	2,387	81.00%	560	19.00%	1,827	62.00%	2,947
Claiborne	3,917	89.04%	482	10.96%	3,435	78.08%	5,399
Concordia	4,022	83.25%	809	16.75%	3,213	66.50%	4,831
DeSoto	3,954	75.92%	1,254	24.08%	2,700	51.84%	5,208
East Baton Rouge	36,964	58.57%	26,152	41.43%	10,812	17.14%	63,116
East Carroll	1,486	84.96%	263	15.04%	1,223	69.92%	1,749
East Feliciana	1,900	79.63%	486	20.37%	1,414	59.26%	2,386
Evangeline	3,975	39.21%	6,163	60.79%	-2,188	-21.58%	10,138
Franklin	5,470	87.82%	759	12.18%	4,711	75.64%	6,229
Grant	3,292	69.36%	1,454	30.64%	1,838	38.72%	4,746
Iberia	8,196	50.17%	8,141	49.83%	55	0.34%	16,337
Iberville	3,432	43.57%	4,445	56.43%	-1,013	-12.86%	7,877
Jackson	4,521	74.44%	1,552	25.56%	2,969	48.88%	6,073
Jefferson	37,161	53.88%	31,804	46.12%	5,357	7.76%	68,965
Jefferson Davis	3,673	42.52%	4,966	57.48%	-1,293	-14.96%	8,639
Lafayette	12,398	46.11%	14,487	53.89%	-2,089	-7.78%	26,885
Lafourche	6,164	33.85%	12,045	66.15%	-5,881	-32.30%	18,209
LaSalle	4,319	83.33%	864	16.67%	3,455	66.66%	5,183
Lincoln	5,766	77.09%	1,714	22.91%	4,052	54.18%	7,480
Livingston	5,508	61.08%	3,509	38.92%	1,999	22.16%	9,017
Madison	2,061	83.17%	417	16.83%	1,644	66.34%	2,478
Morehouse	6,222	87.47%	891	12.53%	5,331	74.94%	7,113
Natchitoches	5,525	65.00%	2,975	35.00%	2,550	30.00%	8,500
Orleans	81,049	49.69%	82,045	50.31%	-996	-0.62%	163,094
Ouachita	21,024	83.44%	4,174	16.56%	16,850	66.88%	25,198
Plaquemines	4,904	86.35%	775	13.65%	4,129	72.70%	5,679
Pointe Coupee	2,327	50.87%	2,247	49.13%	80	1.74%	4,574
Rapides	18,122	64.46%	9,992	35.54%	8,130	28.92%	28,114
Red River	2,235	87.00%	334	13.00%	1,901	74.00%	2,569
Richland	4,498	85.76%	747	14.24%	3,751	71.52%	5,245
Sabine	4,165	66.68%	2,081	33.32%	2,084	33.36%	6,246
St. Bernard	8,055	56.61%	6,175	43.39%	1,880	13.22%	14,230
St. Charles	2,715	34.81%	5,085	65.19%	-2,370	-30.38%	7,800
St. Helena	1,319	65.14%	706	34.86%	613	30.28%	2,025
St. James	1,467	25.82%	4,214	74.18%	-2,747	-48.36%	5,681
St. John the Baptist	1,694	29.97%	3,958	70.03%	-2,264	-40.06%	5,652
St. Landry	10,920	48.05%	11,807	51.95%	-887	-3.90%	22,727
St. Martin	2,793	37.40%	4,675	62.60%	-1,882	-25.20%	7,468
St. Mary	5,530	43.01%	7,327	56.99%	-1,797	-13.98%	12,857
St. Tammany	7,883	54.08%	6,694	45.92%	1,189	8.16%	14,577
Tangipahoa	9,732	57.79%	7,109	42.21%	2,623	15.58%	16,841
Tensas	1,655	89.60%	192	10.40%	1,463	79.20%	1,847
Terrebonne	6,729	43.96%	8,577	56.04%	-1,848	-12.08%	15,306
Union	4,534	79.70%	1,155	20.30%	3,379	59.40%	5,689
Vermilion	4,984	35.13%	9,204	64.87%	-4,220	-29.74%	14,188
Vernon	3,696	50.91%	3,564	49.09%	132	1.82%	7,260
Washington	7,438	60.65%	4,825	39.35%	2,613	21.30%	12,263
Webster	8,177	82.33%	1,755	17.67%	6,422	64.66%	9,932
West Baton Rouge	1,835	49.24%	1,892	50.76%	-57	-1.52%	3,727
West Carroll	3,017	88.42%	395	11.58%	2,622	76.84%	3,412
West Feliciana	897	80.09%	223	19.91%	674	60.18%	1,120
Winn	4,366	78.54%	1,193	21.46%	3,173	57.08%	5,559
Totals	509,225	56.81%	387,068	43.19%	122,157	13.62%	896,293

==== Parishes that flipped from Unpledged to Republican ====
- Bienville
- Claiborne
- Concordia
- DeSoto
- East Carroll
- East Feliciana
- Franklin
- Grant
- Madison
- Plaquemines
- Richland
- St. Bernard
- Red River
- St. Helena
- St. Tammany
- Tangipahoa
- Webster
- West Feliciana
- West Carroll

==== Parishes that flipped from Democratic to Republican ====
- Beauregard
- East Baton Rouge
- Iberia
- Jefferson
- Livingston
- Natchitoches
- Pointe Coupee
- Rapides
- Vernon
- Washington
- Winn

== See also ==
- United States presidential elections in Louisiana

== Works cited ==
- Black, Earl; Black, Merle (1992). The Vital South: How Presidents Are Elected. Harvard University Press. ISBN 0674941306.
