= St. Mary Parish, Louisiana =

Parish in Louisiana, United States

Saint Mary Parish
- Parish
- Parish of Saint Mary; Paroisse de Sainte-Marie (French)
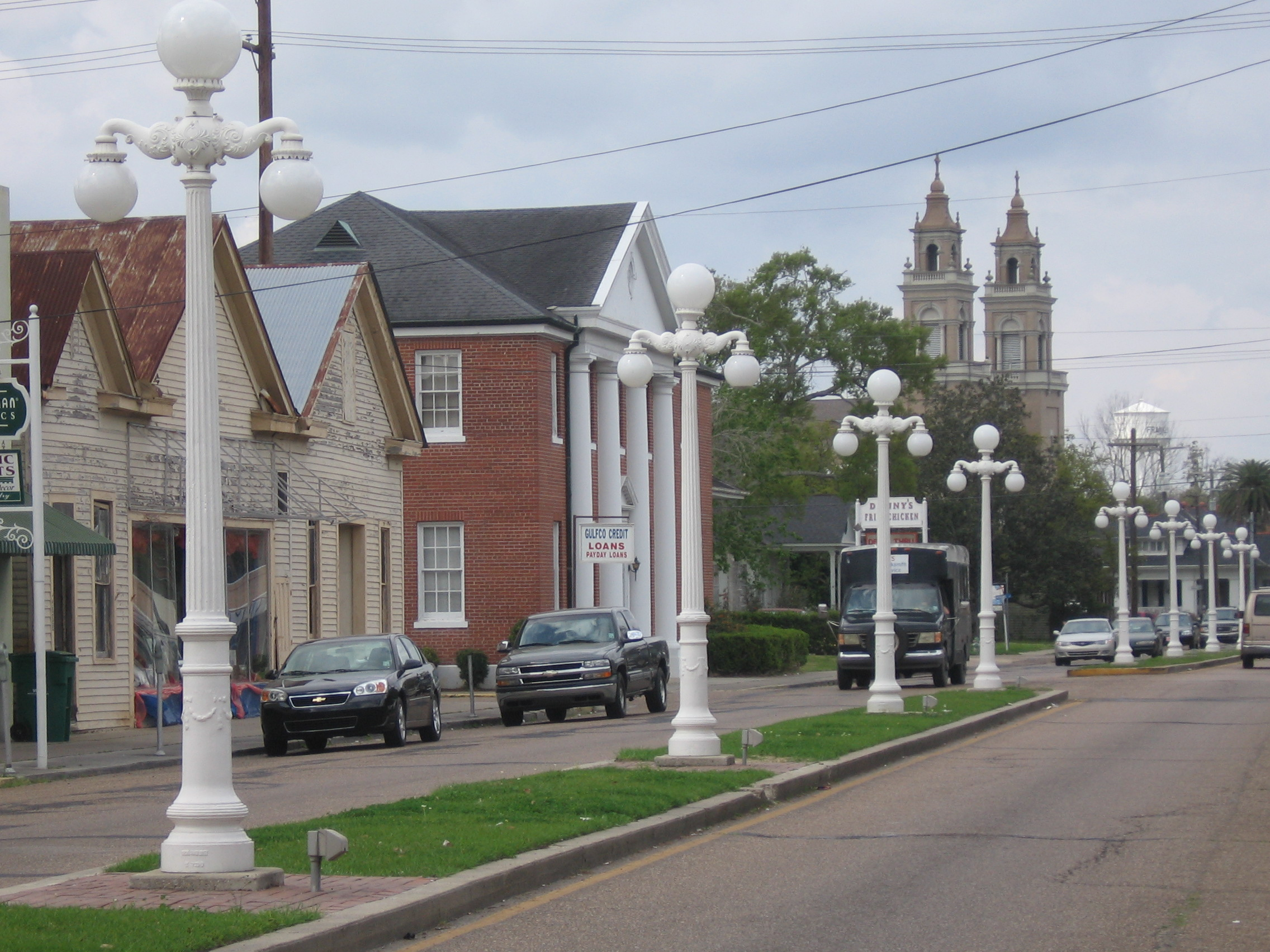
- Main street in Franklin.

- Seal

- Location within the U.S. state of Louisiana
- Coordinates: 29°38′N 91°28′W
- Country: United States
- State: Louisiana
- Founded: 1811
- Named for: Saint Mary
- Seat: Franklin
- Largest city: Morgan City

Area
  - Total: 1,119 sq mi (2,900 km^{2})
  - Land: 555 sq mi (1,440 km^{2})
  - Water: 564 sq mi (1,460 km^{2}) 50%

Population (2020)
  - Total: 49,406
  - Estimate (2025): 46,552 ▼
  - Density: 89.0/sq mi (34.4/km^{2})
- Time zone: UTC−6 (Central)
  - Summer (DST): UTC−5 (CDT)
- Congressional district: 3rd
- Website: www.stmaryparishla.gov

St. Mary Parish (French: Paroisse de Sainte-Marie) is a parish located in the U.S. state of Louisiana. As of the 2020 census, the population was 49,406. The parish seat is Franklin. The parish was created in 1811.

St. Mary Parish comprises the Morgan City, LA Micropolitan Statistical Area, which is also included in the Lafayette–Opelousas–Morgan City combined statistical area.

== Geography ==
According to the U.S. Census Bureau, the parish has a total area of 1,119 square miles (2,900 km^{2}), of which 555 square miles (1,440 km^{2}) is land and 564 square miles (1,460 km^{2}) (50%) is water. Cypremort Point State Park is located in the parish on Vermilion Bay.

=== Major highways ===
- Future Interstate 49
- U.S. Highway 90
  - US 90 Bus.
- Louisiana Highway 70
- Louisiana Highway 83
- Louisiana Highway 87
- Louisiana Highway 182
- Louisiana Highway 317
- Louisiana Highway 318
- Louisiana Highway 319
- Louisiana Highway 322
- Louisiana Highway 323
- Louisiana Highway 324
- Louisiana Highway 326
- Louisiana Highway 668
- Louisiana Highway 670
- Louisiana Highway 3069
- Louisiana Highway 3211
- Louisiana Highway 3215

=== Adjacent parishes ===
- Iberia Parish (northwest)
- St. Martin Parish (northeast)
- Assumption Parish (east)
- Terrebonne Parish (southeast)

== Protected areas ==
The parish has both national and state protected areas within its borders.

=== National protected area ===
- Bayou Teche National Wildlife Refuge

=== State protected areas ===
Part of the Attakapas Wildlife Management Area is located within St. Mary Parish as well as in St. Martin and Iberia Parishes.

== Communities ==
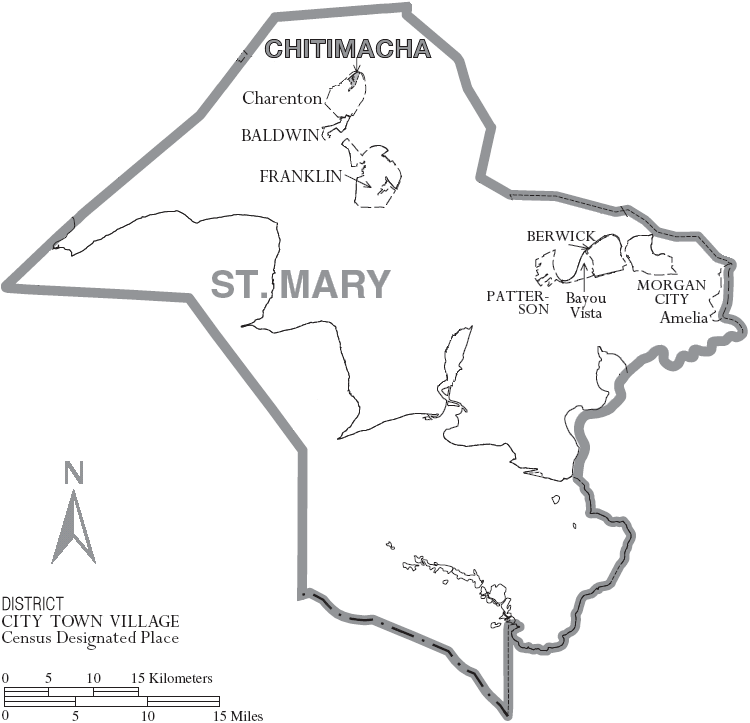
Map of St. Mary Parish, Louisiana With Municipal Labels

=== Cities ===
- Franklin (parish seat)
- Morgan City
- Patterson

=== Towns ===
- Baldwin
- Berwick

=== Census-designated places ===
- Amelia
- Bayou Vista
- Centerville
- Charenton
- Glencoe
- Siracusaville
- Sorrel

=== Other unincorporated areas ===
- Florence
- Garden City

== Demographics ==
Historical population
Census	Pop.	Note	%±
1830	6,442		—
1840	8,950		38.9%
1850	13,697		53.0%
1860	16,816		22.8%
1870	13,860		−17.6%
1880	19,891		43.5%
1890	22,416		12.7%
1900	34,145		52.3%
1910	39,368		15.3%
1920	30,754		−21.9%
1930	29,397		−4.4%
1940	31,458		7.0%
1950	35,848		14.0%
1960	48,833		36.2%
1970	60,752		24.4%
1980	64,253		5.8%
1990	58,086		−9.6%
2000	53,500		−7.9%
2010	54,650		2.1%
2020	49,406		−9.6%
2025 (est.)	46,552	▼	−5.8%
U.S. Decennial Census; 1790-1960 1900-1990; 1990-2000 2010

St. Mary Parish, Louisiana – Racial and ethnic composition Note: the US Census treats Hispanic/Latino as an ethnic category. This table excludes Latinos from the racial categories and assigns them to a separate category. Hispanics/Latinos may be of any race.
Race / Ethnicity (NH = Non-Hispanic)	Pop 1980	Pop 1990	Pop 2000	Pop 2010	Pop 2020	% 1980	% 1990	% 2000	% 2010	% 2020
White alone (NH)	43,480	36,883	33,051	31,267	26,334	67.67%	63.50%	61.78%	57.21%	53.30%
Black or African American alone (NH)	18,241	18,262	16,945	17,648	14,950	28.39%	31.44%	31.67%	32.29%	30.26%
Native American or Alaska Native alone (NH)	388	820	725	933	911	0.60%	1.41%	1.36%	1.71%	1.84%
Asian alone (NH)	528	969	854	935	647	0.82%	1.67%	1.60%	1.71%	1.31%
Native Hawaiian or Pacific Islander alone (NH)	x	x	8	11	13	x	x	0.01%	0.02%	0.03%
Other race alone (NH)	44	24	46	83	179	0.07%	0.04%	0.09%	0.15%	0.36%
Mixed race or Multiracial (NH)	x	x	719	853	1,848	x	x	1.34%	1.56%	3.74%
Hispanic or Latino (any race)	1,572	1,128	1,152	2,920	4,524	2.45%	1.94%	2.15%	5.34%	9.16%
Total	64,253	58,086	53,500	54,650	49,406	100.00%	100.00%	100.00%	100.00%	100.00%

As of the 2020 United States census, there were 49,406 people, 19,856 households, and 11,354 families residing in the parish. As of the census of 2000, there were 53,500 people, 19,317 households, and 14,082 families residing in the parish. The population density was 87 people per square mile (34 people/km^{2}). There were 21,650 housing units at an average density of 35 per square mile (14/km^{2}). The racial makeup of the parish was 62.79% White, 31.79% Black or African American, 1.39% Native American, 1.64% Asian, 0.02% Pacific Islander, 0.88% from other races, and 1.50% from two or more races. 2.15% of the population were Hispanic or Latino of any race. 5.43% reported speaking French or Cajun French at home, while 2.45% speak Spanish and 1.59% Vietnamese.

There were 19,317 households, out of which 36.70% had children under the age of 18 living with them, 51.00% were married couples living together, 16.50% had a female householder with no husband present, and 27.10% were non-families. 23.20% of all households were made up of individuals, and 8.70% had someone living alone who was 65 years of age or older. The average household size was 2.74 and the average family size was 3.23.

In the parish the population was spread out, with 29.70% under the age of 18, 8.70% from 18 to 24, 28.70% from 25 to 44, 21.90% from 45 to 64, and 11.00% who were 65 years of age or older. The median age was 34 years. For every 100 females there were 95.00 males. For every 100 females age 18 and over, there were 92.20 males.

The median income for a household in the parish was $28,072, and the median income for a family was $33,064. Males had a median income of $31,570 versus $18,341 for females. The per capita income for the parish was $13,399. About 20.60% of families and 23.60% of the population were below the poverty line, including 31.30% of those under age 18 and 19.00% of those age 65 or over.

== Education ==
St. Mary Parish School Board operates local public schools.

The Chitimacha Day School, affiliated with the Bureau of Indian Education (BIE), is in the Charenton community of unincorporated St. Mary Parish.

It is in the service area of Fletcher Technical Community College.

== Media ==
St. Mary Parish has two daily newspapers, the Morgan City Daily Review (circulation under 6,000) and the Franklin Banner-Tribune in Franklin (circulation 3,350).

== National Guard ==
B Company 2-156TH Infantry Battalion of the 256TH IBCT resides in Franklin, Louisiana. This unit has deployed to Iraq twice, 2004-5 and 2010.

== Politics ==
United States presidential election results for St. Mary Parish, Louisiana
Year	Republican		Democratic		Third party(ies)	
Year	No.	%	No.	%	No.	%
1912	147	13.89%	652	61.63%	259	24.48%
1916	162	11.42%	652	45.95%	605	42.64%
1920	788	59.38%	539	40.62%	0	0.00%
1924	633	48.69%	639	49.15%	28	2.15%
1928	605	25.65%	1,754	74.35%	0	0.00%
1932	473	18.59%	2,072	81.41%	0	0.00%
1936	487	20.05%	1,942	79.95%	0	0.00%
1940	739	16.70%	3,686	83.30%	0	0.00%
1944	538	13.03%	3,591	86.97%	0	0.00%
1948	824	23.52%	918	26.21%	1,761	50.27%
1952	4,417	50.97%	4,249	49.03%	0	0.00%
1956	4,097	61.49%	2,395	35.94%	171	2.57%
1960	2,992	27.62%	6,671	61.59%	1,169	10.79%
1964	5,530	43.01%	7,327	56.99%	0	0.00%
1968	4,586	27.53%	5,312	31.89%	6,761	40.58%
1972	11,117	68.44%	4,435	27.30%	691	4.25%
1976	8,919	47.67%	9,401	50.25%	388	2.07%
1980	10,378	48.03%	10,506	48.63%	722	3.34%
1984	15,275	61.16%	9,411	37.68%	288	1.15%
1988	11,540	51.71%	10,364	46.44%	414	1.86%
1992	8,792	37.51%	10,648	45.43%	4,000	17.06%
1996	8,018	35.53%	12,402	54.95%	2,149	9.52%
2000	11,325	51.93%	9,851	45.17%	634	2.91%
2004	12,877	56.74%	9,547	42.07%	270	1.19%
2008	13,183	57.56%	9,345	40.80%	375	1.64%
2012	13,885	58.74%	9,450	39.97%	305	1.29%
2016	14,359	62.77%	8,050	35.19%	468	2.05%
2020	14,811	63.88%	8,055	34.74%	320	1.38%
2024	13,671	65.42%	7,011	33.55%	215	1.03%

St. Mary Parish was a swing parish between 1932 and 2004, when it only voted for losing presidential candidates in 1948, 1968, and 1980, with none of these candidates receiving a majority. Since 2008, the parish has become more Republican leaning, with Donald Trump breaking 60% of the vote in all his runs.

== Notable people ==
- Alexander Allain (1920 – 1994), lawyer, library advocate who was one of the 100 most influential library leaders of the 20th century. The Louisiana Library Association named its annual intellectual freedom award for him.
- Bret Allain (born c. 1958), sugar cane farmer and the current District 21 state senator from St. Mary Parish
- Clarence C. "Taddy" Aycock (1915–1987), state House Speaker from 1952 to 1956 and lieutenant governor from 1960 to 1972
- Carl W. Bauer (1933-2013), attorney-lobbyist; former member of both houses of the Louisiana State Legislature
- Ralph Norman Bauer (1899-1963), attorney; former Speaker of the Louisiana House; a leader of the impeachment forces against Governor Huey P. Long, Jr., in 1929
- V.J. Bella (born 1927), former state representative (1972–1990) and state fire marshal (1990–1992; 1996–2004)
- Elizabeth Bisland (1861–1929), noted journalist and author
- Sally Clausen, former president of Southeastern Louisiana University in Hammoned and Louisiana commissioner of higher education; reared in St. Mary Parish
- Thomas G. Clausen, Louisiana education superintendent from 1984 to 1988; reared in St. Mary Parish
- Murphy James "Mike" Foster, Jr. (1930-2020), governor of Louisiana from 1996 to 2004
- Elizabeth Francis (1909-2024), supercentenarian who until her death in 2024 was the oldest living American and the world's third oldest living person
- Geronimo Pratt, Vietnam War veteran who served twenty-seven years in prison wrongfully accused of murder
- William Joseph Seymour (born 1870), considered to be the most influential African American minister of the twentieth century and pastor of the famous Azusa Street Revival
- Warren Wells, Pro football player for the Detroit Lions and Oakland Raiders
- Dale Hawkins, (born 1936, died 2010) pioneer of swamp rock boogie

== See also ==
- National Register of Historic Places listings in St. Mary Parish, Louisiana
