= Siracusaville, Louisiana =

- Census-designated place
- Location of Siracusaville in Louisiana
- Coordinates: 29°41′13″N 91°8′53″W
- Country: United States
- State: Louisiana
- Parish: St. Mary

Area
  - Total: 0.85 sq mi (2.21 km^{2})
  - Land: 0.80 sq mi (2.07 km^{2})
  - Water: 0.054 sq mi (0.14 km^{2})
- Elevation: 3 ft (0.91 m)

Population (2020)
  - Total: 297
  - Density: 371.8/sq mi (143.56/km^{2})
- Time zone: UTC-6 (CST)
  - Summer (DST): UTC-5 (CDT)
- Area code: 985
- FIPS code: 22-70675

Siracusaville is a census-designated place (CDP) in St. Mary Parish, Louisiana, United States. As of the 2020 census, Siracusaville had a population of 297. It is part of the Morgan City Micropolitan Statistical Area.

== Geography ==
Siracusaville is located at 29°41′13″N 91°8′53″W (29.68715, -91.14186), adjacent to the eastern border of Morgan City. Louisiana State Route 182 is an east-west road that passes through the southern part of the community, along the edge of Bayou Boeuf, part of the Intracoastal Waterway. U.S. Route 90, a four-lane expressway, forms the northeastern border of the CDP but provides no direct access to it; the closest exits are Exit 176 in Morgan City to the west and Exit 181 in Amelia to the east.

According to the United States Census Bureau, the CDP has a total area of 0.85 square miles (2.2 km^{2}), of which 0.81 square miles (2.1 km^{2}) is land and 0.04 square miles (0.1 km^{2}), or 6.37%, is water.

== Demographics ==
Historical population
| Census | Pop. | Note | %± |
|---|---|---|---|
| 2010 | 422 | | — |
| 2020 | 297 | | −29.6% |
U.S. Decennial Census

Siracusaville first appeared as a census designated place in the 2010 U.S. census.

Siracusaville CDP, Louisiana – Racial and ethnic composition Note: the US Census treats Hispanic/Latino as an ethnic category. This table excludes Latinos from the racial categories and assigns them to a separate category. Hispanics/Latinos may be of any race.
| Race / Ethnicity (NH = Non-Hispanic) | Pop 2010 | Pop 2020 | % 2010 | % 2020 |
|---|---|---|---|---|
| White alone (NH) | 13 | 13 | 3.08% | 4.38% |
| Black or African American alone (NH) | 395 | 264 | 93.60% | 88.89% |
| Native American or Alaska Native alone (NH) | 0 | 0 | 0.00% | 0.00% |
| Asian alone (NH) | 1 | 0 | 0.24% | 0.00% |
| Native Hawaiian or Pacific Islander alone (NH) | 0 | 0 | 0.00% | 0.00% |
| Other race alone (NH) | 3 | 0 | 0.71% | 0.00% |
| Mixed race or Multiracial (NH) | 10 | 10 | 2.37% | 3.37% |
| Hispanic or Latino (any race) | 0 | 10 | 0.00% | 3.37% |
| Total | 422 | 297 | 100.00% | 100.00% |
