= 1968 United States presidential election in Louisiana =

- November 5, 1968

Nominee	George Wallace	Hubert Humphrey	Richard Nixon
Party	American Independent	Democratic	Republican
Home state	Alabama	Minnesota	New York (Note: Although he was born in California and he served as a U.S. senator from California, in 1968 Richard Nixon’s official state of residence was New York, because he moved there to practice law after his defeat in the 1962 California gubernatorial election. During his first term as president, Nixon re-established his residency in California. Consequently, most reliable reference books list Nixon's home state as New York in the 1968 election and his home state as California in the 1972 (and 1960) election.)
Running mate	Curtis LeMay	Edmund Muskie	Spiro Agnew
Electoral vote	10	0	0
Popular vote	530,300	309,615	257,535
Percentage	48.32%	28.21%	23.47%
Parish results
Wallace
30–40%
40–50%
50–60%
60–70%
70–80%
80–90%
Humphrey
40–50%
President before election
Lyndon B. Johnson
Democratic
Elected President
Richard Nixon
Republican

The 1968 United States presidential election in Louisiana was held on November 5, 1968, as part of the 1968 United States presidential election. Along with four other contiguous southern states, former and future Alabama Governor George Wallace won the state for the American Party by a large margin against Democrat Hubert Humphrey and Republican Richard Nixon. As of the 2024 presidential election, this is the last election in which Jefferson Parish, St. Tammany Parish, Lafayette Parish, Ouachita Parish, Bossier Parish, Union Parish, and LaSalle Parish did not vote for the Republican presidential candidate.

With 48.32% of the popular vote, Louisiana would prove to be Wallace's third strongest state after Alabama and Mississippi. This is the most recent election cycle in which a Republican would win the presidency without carrying Louisiana. This was also the last election until 2008 in which Louisiana voted for a losing presidential candidate.

== Campaign ==
Among white voters, 60% supported Wallace, 28% supported Nixon, and 12% supported Humphrey.

== Results ==
Presidential Candidate	Running Mate	Party	Electoral Vote (EV)	Popular Vote (PV)	
George Wallace of Alabama	Curtis LeMay	American	10	530,300	48.32%
Hubert Humphrey	Edmund Muskie	Democratic	0	309,615	28.21%
Richard Nixon	Spiro Agnew	Republican	0	257,535	23.47%

=== Results by parish ===
Parish	George Wallace American Independent		Hubert Humphrey Democratic		Richard Nixon Republican		Margin		Total votes cast
Parish	#	%	#	%	#	%	#	%	Total votes cast
Acadia	9,715	57.18%	4,098	24.12%	3,178	18.70%	5,617	33.06%	16,991
Allen	4,229	58.26%	2,026	27.91%	1,004	13.83%	2,203	30.35%	7,259
Ascension	6,004	56.94%	3,203	30.37%	1,338	12.69%	2,801	26.57%	10,545
Assumption	2,898	46.70%	2,085	33.60%	1,222	19.69%	813	13.10%	6,205
Avoyelles	6,760	55.45%	2,973	24.38%	2,459	20.17%	3,787	31.07%	12,192
Beauregard	4,048	55.97%	1,569	21.70%	1,615	22.33%	2,433 (Note: In this parish where Nixon ran second ahead of Humphrey, margin given is Wallace vote minus Nixon vote and percentage margin is Wallace percentage minus Nixon percentage.)	33.64%	7,232
Bienville	3,466	56.13%	1,768	28.63%	941	15.24%	1,698	27.50%	6,175
Bossier	9,249	58.63%	2,782	17.63%	3,745	23.74%	5,504	34.89%	15,776
Caddo	28,463	42.25%	17,675	26.24%	21,224	31.51%	7,239	10.74%	67,362
Calcasieu	20,250	45.65%	14,593	32.89%	9,520	21.46%	5,657	12.76%	44,363
Caldwell	2,252	60.62%	973	26.19%	490	13.19%	1,279	34.43%	3,715
Cameron	1,655	63.83%	533	20.56%	405	15.62%	1,122	43.27%	2,593
Catahoula	2,677	63.72%	769	18.31%	755	17.97%	1,908	45.41%	4,201
Claiborne	3,311	55.43%	1,545	25.87%	1,117	18.70%	1,766	29.56%	5,973
Concordia	4,542	60.57%	1,983	26.44%	974	12.99%	2,559	34.13%	7,499
DeSoto	4,190	48.93%	3,400	39.70%	974	11.37%	790	9.23%	8,564
East Baton Rouge	35,250	44.80%	21,770	27.67%	21,661	27.53%	13,480	17.13%	78,681
East Carroll	1,706	40.45%	1,926	45.66%	586	13.89%	-220	-5.21%	4,218
East Feliciana	2,225	54.39%	1,409	34.44%	457	11.17%	816	19.95%	4,091
Evangeline	7,362	63.70%	2,647	22.90%	1,549	13.40%	4,715	40.80%	11,558
Franklin	5,394	75.68%	681	9.56%	1,052	14.76%	4,342	60.92%	7,127
Grant	3,470	62.92%	932	16.90%	1,113	20.18%	2,357	42.74%	5,515
Iberia	8,071	42.41%	5,510	28.96%	5,448	28.63%	2,561	13.45%	19,029
Iberville	4,290	43.83%	4,084	41.73%	1,413	14.44%	206	2.10%	9,787
Jackson	3,941	59.98%	1,525	23.21%	1,104	16.80%	2,416	36.77%	6,570
Jefferson	41,902	45.76%	20,193	22.05%	29,478	32.19%	12,424	13.57%	91,573
Jefferson Davis	4,897	50.22%	2,641	27.08%	2,213	22.70%	2,256	23.14%	9,751
Lafayette	11,723	38.59%	7,983	26.28%	10,669	35.12%	1,054	3.47%	30,375
Lafourche	10,910	51.41%	5,516	25.99%	4,797	22.60%	5,394	25.42%	21,223
LaSalle	3,878	66.34%	710	12.15%	1,258	21.52%	2,620	44.82%	5,846
Lincoln	4,225	47.59%	2,009	22.63%	2,643	29.77%	1,582	17.82%	8,877
Livingston	9,907	80.85%	1,400	11.42%	947	7.73%	8,507	69.43%	12,254
Madison	2,380	41.84%	2,659	46.75%	649	11.41%	-279	-4.91%	5,688
Morehouse	5,377	60.13%	1,793	20.05%	1,772	19.82%	3,584	40.08%	8,942
Natchitoches	5,505	46.64%	3,945	33.43%	2,352	19.93%	1,560	13.21%	11,802
Orleans	58,489	32.74%	72,451	40.55%	47,728	26.71%	-13,962	-7.81%	178,668
Ouachita	15,145	47.77%	6,470	20.41%	10,089	31.82%	5,056	15.95%	31,704
Plaquemines	6,430	75.28%	1,144	13.39%	968	11.33%	5,286	61.89%	8,542
Pointe Coupee	3,508	46.79%	3,139	41.87%	850	11.34%	369	4.92%	7,497
Rapides	16,239	46.09%	8,793	24.96%	10,199	28.95%	6,040	17.14%	35,231
Red River	2,477	65.69%	914	24.24%	380	10.08%	1,563	41.45%	3,771
Richland	4,415	68.31%	1,017	15.74%	1,031	15.95%	3,384	52.36%	6,463
Sabine	4,526	66.46%	1,159	17.02%	1,125	16.52%	3,367	49.44%	6,810
St. Bernard	13,056	68.62%	2,485	13.06%	3,486	18.32%	9,570	50.30%	19,027
St. Charles	4,383	48.02%	3,070	33.63%	1,675	18.35%	1,313	14.39%	9,128
St. Helena	1,800	53.41%	1,351	40.09%	219	6.50%	449	13.32%	3,370
St. James	2,765	42.34%	2,987	45.74%	778	11.91%	-222	-3.40%	6,530
St. John the Baptist	3,246	43.68%	3,245	43.67%	940	12.65%	1	0.01%	7,431
St. Landry	12,659	50.15%	9,075	35.95%	3,508	13.90%	3,584	14.20%	25,242
St. Martin	4,759	49.04%	3,321	34.22%	1,625	16.74%	1,438	14.82%	9,705
St. Mary	6,761	40.58%	5,312	31.89%	4,586	27.53%	1,449	8.69%	16,659
St. Tammany	11,470	55.25%	4,445	21.41%	4,846	23.34%	6,624	31.91%	20,761
Tangipahoa	13,088	62.39%	4,983	23.75%	2,907	13.86%	8,105	38.64%	20,978
Tensas	1,290	48.90%	845	32.03%	503	19.07%	445	16.87%	2,638
Terrebonne	8,836	47.31%	4,627	24.77%	5,214	27.92%	3,622	19.39%	18,677
Union	4,297	63.70%	1,336	19.80%	1,113	16.50%	2,961	43.90%	6,746
Vermilion	8,124	53.42%	3,806	25.03%	3,278	21.55%	4,318	28.39%	15,208
Vernon	5,536	64.33%	1,496	17.38%	1,574	18.29%	3,962	46.04%	8,606
Washington	11,002	70.00%	3,021	19.22%	1,695	10.78%	7,981	50.78%	15,718
Webster	8,646	61.70%	2,871	20.49%	2,496	17.81%	5,775	41.21%	14,013
West Baton Rouge	2,569	48.90%	2,016	38.37%	669	12.73%	553	10.53%	5,254
West Carroll	3,574	78.48%	395	8.67%	585	12.85%	2,989	65.63%	4,554
West Feliciana	1,073	40.16%	1,303	48.76%	296	11.08%	-230	-8.60%	2,672
Winn	4,015	63.78%	1,230	19.54%	1,050	16.68%	2,785	44.24%	6,295
Totals	530,300	48.32%	309,615	28.21%	257,535	23.47%	220,685	20.11%	1,097,450

==== Parishes that flipped from Republican to American Independent ====
- Bienville
- DeSoto
- East Feliciana
- Caddo
- Caldwell
- Catahoula
- Claiborne
- Concordia
- Franklin
- Iberia
- Jackson
- Morehouse
- Natchitoches
- Red River
- Sabine
- Tangipahoa
- Tensas
- Vernon
- Washington
- Webster
- Winn
- East Baton Rouge
- Lincoln
- Plaquemines
- Pointe Coupee
- St. Helena
- Rapides
- Richland
- St. Bernard

==== Parishes that flipped from Democratic to American Independent ====
- Allen
- Acadia
- Ascension
- Assumption
- Avoyelles
- Calcasieu
- Cameron
- Evangeline
- Iberville
- Jefferson Davis
- Lafourche
- St. Mary
- St. John the Baptist
- St. Landry
- St. Martin
- Vermilion
- St. Charles
- Terrebonne

==== Parishes that flipped from Republican to Democratic ====
- East Carroll
- Madison
- West Feliciana

== See also ==
- United States presidential elections in Louisiana

== Works cited ==
- Black, Earl; Black, Merle (1992). The Vital South: How Presidents Are Elected. Harvard University Press. ISBN 0674941306.
