= C-Murder discography =

- Studio albums: 9
- Soundtrack albums: 3
- Compilation albums: 10
- Singles: 9
- Music videos: 29
- Mixtapes: 1

This is the discography of C-Murder, an American rapper; consists of seven studio albums, nine singles, Music videos, one mixtape, one collaboration album and guest appearances are also included. He also the founder of the Vanity label TRU Records.

== Albums ==
=== Studio albums ===
List of albums, with selected chart positions
Title	Album details	Peak chart positions		Certifications
Title	Album details	US	US R&B	Certifications
Life or Death	Released: March 24, 1998; Label: No Limit / Priority; Format: CD, digital download, LP	3	1	RIAA: Platinum
Bossalinie	Released: March 9, 1999; Label: No Limit / Priority / EMI; Format: CD, digital download, LP	2	1	RIAA: Gold
Trapped in Crime	Released: September 5, 2000; Label: No Limit / TRU / Priority; Format: CD, digital download, LP	8	1	
C-P-3.com	Released: October 23, 2001; Label: No Limit / TRU / Priority; Format: CD, digital download, LP	45	10	
The Truest Shit I Ever Said	Released: March 22, 2005; Label: TRU / Koch; Format: CD, digital download, LP	41	5	
Screamin' 4 Vengeance	Released: July 1, 2008; Label: TRU / Asylum; Format: CD, digital download	130	17	
Calliope Click Volume 1	Released: September 29, 2009; Label: TRU / RBC; Format: CD, digital download	–	68	
Tomorrow	Released: June 15, 2010; Label: TRU / Venti Uno; Format: CD, digital download	–	–	
Ain't No Heaven In the Pen	Released: March 24, 2015; Label: Bossalinie, Rapbay, Urbanlife Distribution; Format: CD, digital download	–	–	
Give Me Freedom or Give Me Death	Released: August 6, 2021; Label: TRU, Rapbay, Urbanlife Distribution; Format: CD, digital download	–	–	

=== Collaboration albums ===
List of albums, with selected chart positions
Title	Album details	Peak chart positions		
Title	Album details	US	US R&B	US Rap
Penitentiary Chances (with Boosie Badazz)	Released: April 14, 2016; Label: Bossalinie, Bad Azz, RBC; Format: CD, digital download	172	15	9
"—" denotes a recording that did not chart.

=== Soundtrack albums ===
List of soundtrack album's
Title	Album details	Peak chart positions		Certifications
Title	Album details	US	US R&B	Certifications
I'm Bout It (with Various artists)	Released: May 13, 1997; Label: No Limit/Priority; Formats: CD, MD, LP	4	1	RIAA: Platinum
I Got the Hook Up (with Various artists)	Released: April 7, 1998; Label: No Limit/Priority; Format: CD, MD, LP	3	1	RIAA: Platinum
Foolish (with Various artists)	Released: March 23, 1999; Label: No Limit/Priority; Format: CD, digital download, LP	32	10	RIAA: Gold

=== Mixtapes ===
C-Murder's mixtapes and details
Title	Mixtape details
Ricochet	Released: June 11, 2013; Label: TRU

=== Compilation albums ===
List of compilation albums, with selected chart positions and certifications
Title	Album details	Peak chart positions		Certifications
Title	Album details	US	US R&B	Certifications
West Coast Bad Boyz: High fo Xmas (with Various artists as West Coast Bad Boyz)	Released: November 8, 1994; Label: No Limit/Priority; Formats: CD, LP	—	—	
Down South Hustlers: Bouncin' and Swingin' (with Various artists)	Released: October 31, 1995; Label: No Limit/Priority; Formats: CD, LP	139	13	
West Coast Bad Boyz II (with Various artists as West Coast Bad Boyz)	Released: January 10, 1997; Label: No Limit/Priority; Formats: CD, LP	17	6	
Mean Green (with Various artists)	Released: September 28, 1998; Label: No Limit/Priority; Formats: CD, LP	9	6	RIAA: Gold
We Can't Be Stopped (with No Limit)	Released: September 28, 1998; Label: No Limit/Priority; Formats: CD, LP	19	2	
Who U Wit? (with Various artists)	Released: May 25, 1999; Label: No Limit/Priority; Formats: CD, LP	62	22	
Tru Dawgs	Released: April 30, 2002; Label: Riviera; Format: CD, digital download	67	15	
The Best of C-Murder	Released: October 4, 2005; Label: Priority; Format: CD, digital download	–	–	
The Tru Story: Continued	Released: September 5, 2006; Label: Koch; Format: CD, digital download	–	35	
Community Service	Released: September 8, 2009; Label: Kernell; Format: CD, digital download	–	–	

== Singles ==
=== As lead artist ===
List of singles, with selected chart positions, showing year released and album name
Title	Year	Peak chart positions			Album
Title	Year	US	US R&B	CAN	Album
"A 2nd Chance" (featuring Mo B. Dick, Master P & Silkk the Shocker)	1998	—	—	—	Life or Death
"Making Moves" (featuring Master P & Mo B. Dick)	1998	—	—	—	Life or Death
"Like A Jungle"	1999	—	—	—	Bossalinie
"I Remember" (featuring Magic & Porsha)	1999	—	—	—	Bossalinie
"Down for My N's" (with Snoop Dogg; featuring Magic)	2000	111	29	—	No Limit Top Dogg and Trapped in Crime
"Hustlin'"	2000	—	—	14	Trapped in Crime
"They Don't Really Know You" (featuring Erica Fox & Master P)	2000	—	—	—	Trapped in Crime
"I'm Not Just" (featuring Soulja Slim & T-Bo)	2001	—	—	—	C-P-3.com
"What U Gonna Do" (featuring Ms. Peaches & Silkk The Shocker)	2001	—	—	—	C-P-3.com
"My Life"	2005	—	—	—	The Truest Shit I Ever Said
"Y'all Heard of Me" (featuring B.G.)	2005	—	—	—	The Truest Shit I Ever Said
"Be Fresh"	2008	—	—	—	Screamin' 4 Vengeance
"Posted on the Block (Remix)" (featuring Krayzie Bone, Papoose, Mia X & Verse)	2008	—	—	—	Screamin' 4 Vengeance
"Hard 2 Be Black" (featuring Snoop Dogg & Boosie Badazz)	2014	—	—	—	Ain't No Heaven In the Pen
"All I Wanted 2 Be Was a Soldier"	2015	—	—	—	Ain't No Heaven In the Pen
"For My Homies Dead & Gone" (featuring Boosie Badazz & Lil Kano)	2015	—	—	—	Ain't No Heaven In the Pen
"Dear Young Boy"	2022	—	—	—	Non-album singles
"—" denotes a title that did not chart, or was not released in that territory.

=== As featured artist ===
List of singles as featured artist, with selected chart positions and certifications, showing year released and album name
Title	Year	Peak chart positions			Album
Title	Year	US	US R&B	US Rap	Album
"No Hope" (Magic featuring C-Murder, Lady TRU & Sons of Funk)	1998	—	—	—	Sky's the Limit
