= List of Snoop Dogg guest appearances =

Snoop Dogg guest appearances
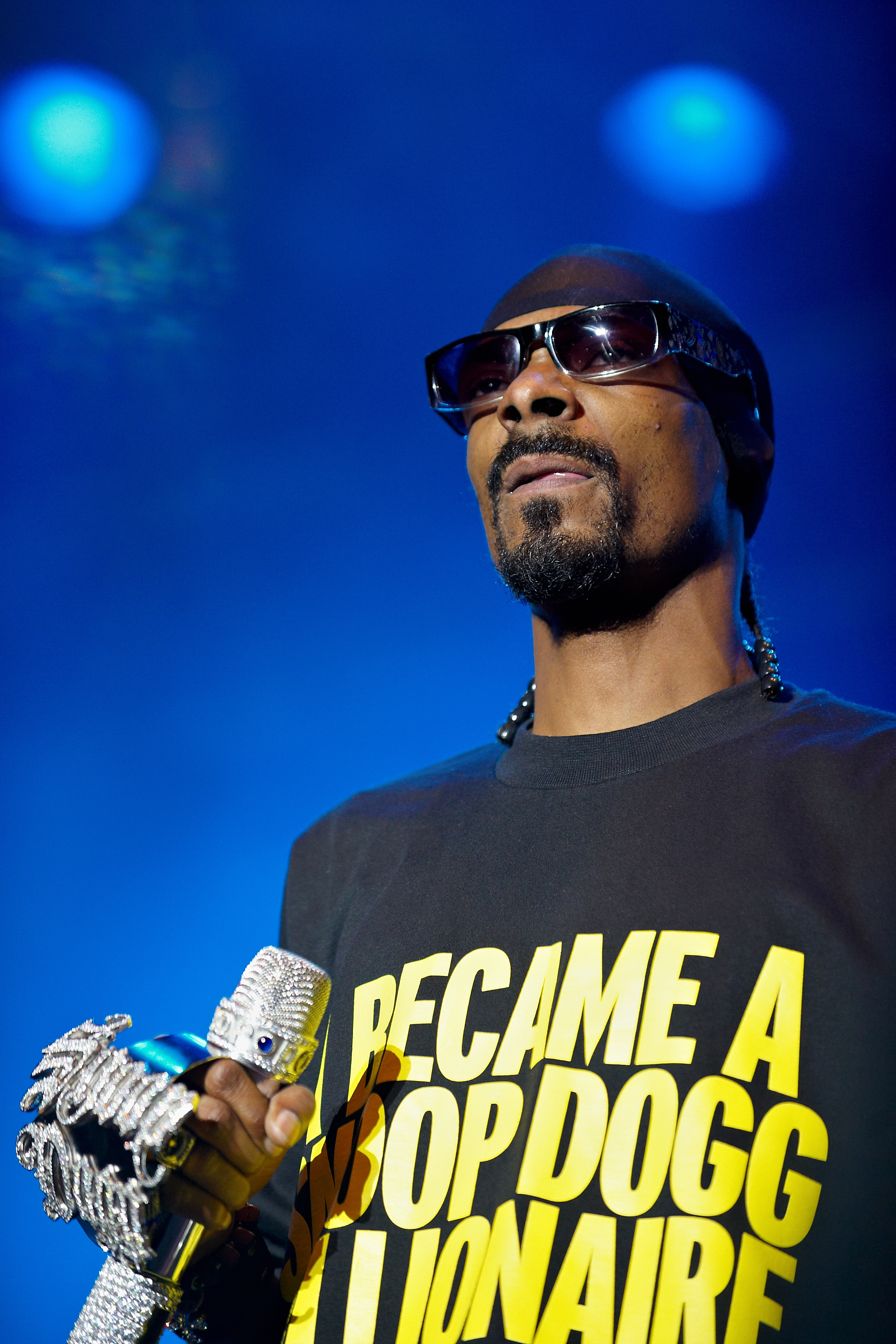
- Snoop Dogg performing in 2009
- Guest appearances: 500+

The American rapper Snoop Dogg has appeared on more than 500 non-single songs as a featured artist, a record among solo artists. MusicMagpie, a British online retailer, stated that Snoop Dogg has been featured on approximately 583 songs—although they included Snoop Dogg's featured singles. VladTV, an interview broadcast hosted by DJ Vlad also noted that Snoop Dogg has been featured on the most songs among rap-artists, as well as an artist in general with 583 (or more) features to his name.

== 1990s ==
List of non-single guest appearances, with other performing artists, showing year released and album name.
| Title | Year | Other performer(s) | Album |
|---|---|---|---|
| "The Chronic (Intro)" (as Snoop Doggy Dogg) | 1992 | Dr. Dre | The Chronic |
| "The Day the Niggaz Took Over" (as Snoop Doggy Dogg) | 1992 | Dr. Dre, RBX, Jewell | The Chronic |
| "Deeez Nuuuts" (as Snoop Doggy Dogg) | 1992 | Dr. Dre, Warren G, Dat Nigga Daz, Nate Dogg | The Chronic |
| "Lil' Ghetto Boy" (as Snoop Doggy Dogg) | 1992 | Dr. Dre, Dat Nigga Daz, Nate Dogg | The Chronic |
| "A Nigga Witta Gun" (as Snoop Doggy Dogg) | 1992 | Dr. Dre | The Chronic |
| "Rat-Tat-Tat-Tat" (as Snoop Doggy Dogg) | 1992 | Dr. Dre, RBX, BJ | The Chronic |
| "The $20 Sack Pyramid (Skit)" (as Snoop Doggy Dogg) | 1992 | Dr. Dre, Samara, Big Tittie Nickie, The D.O.C. | The Chronic |
| "Stranded on Death Row" (as Snoop Doggy Dogg) | 1992 | Dr. Dre, Bushwick Bill, Kurupt, RBX, The Lady of Rage | The Chronic |
| "Bitches Ain't Shit" (as Snoop Doggy Dogg) | 1992 | Dr. Dre, Dat Nigga Daz, Kurupt, Jewell | The Chronic |
| "Niggaz Is Lyke Dat" (as Snoop Doggy Dogg) | 1993 | Chocolate, C.P.O., 3-2 | Life-N-A-Day |
| "Big Pimpin '"(as Snoop Doggy Dogg) | 1994 | Tha Dogg Pound, Nate Dogg | Above the Rim (soundtrack) |
| "Dogg Pound 4 Life" (as Snoop Doggy Dogg) | 1994 | Tha Dogg Pound Gangstas | Above the Rim (soundtrack) |
| "21 Jump Street" (as Snoop Doggy Dogg) | 1994 | Big Tray Dee | Murder Was the Case |
| "Who Got Some Gangsta Shit?" (as Snoop Doggy Dogg) | 1994 | Tha Dogg Pound, Swoop G, Lil C-Style | Murder Was the Case |
| "Save Yourself" (as Snoop Doggy Dogg) | 1995 | none | The Show (soundtrack) |
| "Smooth" (as Snoop Doggy Dogg) | 1995 | Tha Dogg Pound, Val Young | Dogg Food |
| "Cyco-Lic-No (Bitch Azz Niggaz)" (as Snoop Doggy Dogg) | 1995 | Tha Dogg Pound, Mr. Malik | Dogg Food |
| "If We All Fuc" (as Snoop Doggy Dogg) | 1995 | Tha Dogg Pound | Dogg Food |
| "Some Bomb Azz Pussy" (as Snoop Doggy Dogg) | 1995 | Tha Dogg Pound | Dogg Food |
| "A Dogg'z Day Afternoon" (as Snoop Doggy Dogg) | 1995 | Tha Dogg Pound, Nate Dogg | Dogg Food |
| "187um" (Deep Cover OST) (as Snoop Doggy Dogg) | 1995 | Dr. Dre | One Million Strong |
| "All About U" (as Snoop Doggy Dogg) | 1996 | 2Pac, Nate Dogg, Dru Down, Fatal, Yaki Kadafi | All Eyez on Me |
| "Santa Claus Goes Straight to the Ghetto"(as Snoop Doggy Dogg) | 1996 | Daz Dillinger, Nate Dogg, Tray Deee, Bad Azz | Christmas on Death Row |
| "Out the Moon (Boom, Boom, Boom)" (as Snoop Doggy Dogg) | 1997 | Soopafly, Techniec, Bad Azz, Tray Deee, 2Pac | Gridlock'd (soundtrack) |
| "Off the Hook" (as Snoop Doggy Dogg) | 1997 | Charlie Wilson, Val Young, James DeBarge | Gridlock'd (soundtrack) |
| "Rough, Rugged and Raw" (as Snoop Doggy Dogg) | 1997 | The Lady of Rage, Daz Dillinger | Necessary Roughness |
| "Gettin' Funky" (as Snoop Doggy Dogg) | 1997 | SWV | Release Some Tension |
| "You Bring Me Up" (Mr. Dalvin Remix) (as Snoop Doggy Dogg) | 1997 | K-Ci & JoJo | —N/a |
| "The Fatha Figure" (as Snoop Doggy Dogg) | 1997 | JT the Bigga Figga | Heat |
| "Santa Baby" (as Snoop Doggy Dogg) | 1997 | Rev Run & The Christmas All-Stars, Mase, Puff Daddy, Salt-n-Pepa, Onyx, Keith Murray | A Very Special Christmas 3 |
| "Tha Way We Run It" (Remix) (as Snoop Doggy Dogg) | 1997 | MC Eiht, B-Real | —N/a |
| "Hollywood Bank Robbery" (as Snoop Doggy Dogg) | 1997 | Tha Gang | Gang Related (soundtrack) |
| "Player's Way" (as Snoop Doggy Dogg) | 1997 | Rick James | Urban Rapsody |
| "Gangstas" (as Snoop Doggy Dogg) | 1997 | Mystikal, Master P | Unpredictable |
| "Freaky Tales" (as Snoop Doggy Dogg) | 1997 | none | In tha Beginning...There Was Rap |
| "Feels So Good"(as Snoop Doggy Dogg) | 1998 | Eastsiders | Ride (soundtrack) |
| "Throw Yo Hood Up" | 1998 | Silkk the Shocker, Master P | Charge It 2 da Game |
| "Ride On/Caught Up"(as Snoop Doggy Dogg) | 1998 | Kurupt | Caught Up (soundtrack) |
| "O.G." | 1998 | Daz Dillinger, Nate Dogg | Retaliation, Revenge and Get Back |
| "Hooked"(as Snoop Doggy Dogg) | 1998 | none | I Got the Hook Up (soundtrack) |
| "Who Got the Fire" | 1998 | Fiend, Master P | There's One in Every Family |
| "We Came to Rock Ya Body" | 1998 | The Click, Tha Dogg Pound | Boss Ballin' 2: The Mob Bosses |
| "At the Same Time" | 1998 | Soulja Slim | Give It 2 'Em Raw |
| "N.L. Party" | 1998 | Soulja Slim, Master P, Silkk the Shocker, Full Blooded, Tre-Nitty, Gambino Family, Big Ed, Prime Suspects, Mac, Kane & Abel, Magic | Give It 2 'Em Raw |
| "Soldiers, Riders & G's" | 1998 | Master P, Mystikal, Silkk the Shocker | MP da Last Don |
| "Thug Girl" | 1998 | Master P, Silkk the Shocker | MP da Last Don |
| "War Wounds" | 1998 | Master P, Mystikal, Fiend, Silkk the Shocker | MP da Last Don |
| "Mama Raised Me" | 1998 | Master P, Soulja Slim | MP da Last Don |
| "Snitches" | 1998 | Master P | MP da Last Don |
| "Make 'Em Say Uhh! #2" | 1998 | Master P, Fiend, Mia X, Silkk the Shocker | MP da Last Don |
| "So Whatcha Want?" | 1998 | MC Ren, RBX | Ruthless for Life |
| "Out of Town G's" | 1998 | Kane & Abel | Am I My Brother's Keeper |
| "My Hood to Yo Hood" | 1998 | Kane & Abel | Am I My Brother's Keeper |
| "Protectors of 1472" | 1998 | Jermaine Dupri, R.O.C., Warren G | Life in 1472 |
| "Wooo" | 1998 | Mac, Kane & Abel, Mr. Serv-On, Big Ed, Mia X | Shell Shocked |
| "Friends" | 1998 | Nate Dogg, Warren G | G-Funk Classics, Vol. 1 & 2 |
| "Puppy Love" | 1998 | Nate Dogg, Daz Dillinger, Kurupt | G-Funk Classics, Vol. 1 & 2 |
| "Dogg Pound Gangstaville" | 1998 | Nate Dogg, Kurupt | G-Funk Classics, Vol. 1 & 2 |
| "Make Some Room" | 1998 | Big Ed, Mia X, Mac, C-Murder | The Assassin |
| "Mistakes in the Game" | 1998 | Skull Duggery | These Wicked Streets |
| "Get Ya Girl Dogg" | 1998 | MC Eiht, Jayo Felony | Straight Outta Cali |
| "I Got Love 4 Ya" | 1998 | Magic, Steady Mobb'n | Sky's the Limit |
| "No Limit" | 1998 | Magic, C-Murder | Sky's the Limit |
| "When Drama Came" | 1998 | Magic, Fiend | Sky's the Limit |
| "Dying in My City" | 1998 | C-Murder, Magic | Mean Green |
| "Message from Snoop Dogg" | 1998 | none | School Dayz |
| "Baka Bootleg" | 1998 | The Baka Boyz, Boot Camp Clik | Friday Nite Flavas |
| "My Old Lady" | 1998 | Prime Suspect, Fiend | Guilty 'til Proven Innocent |
| "Poor Man Cry" | 1998 | Barrington Levy, Crooked I, Daz Dillinger, Soopafly | Living Dangerously |
| "LBC and the ING" | 1998 | Mack 10 | The Recipe |
| "Studio B" | 1998 | Gambino Family, Mo B. Dick | Ghetto Organized |
| "What's Ya Point" | 1998 | Mia X, Fat Joe | Mama Drama |
| "Interlude" | 1998 | Kid Capri, Warren G | Soundtrack to the Streets |
| "We're Unified" (Trackmasters Remix) | 1998 | Kid Capri, Slick Rick | Soundtrack to the Streets |
| "Gangsta, Gangsta" | 1998 | C-Murder | Straight Outta Compton: N.W.A 10th Anniversary Tribute |
| "Medley for a "V" (The Pussy Medley)" | 1998 | DJ Quik, Nate Dogg, Hi-C, 2nd II None, AMG, El DeBarge | Rhythm-al-ism |
| "Lifestylez of a G" | 1998 | Lifestyle Crew | Fakin' da Funk |
| "Let Me Hit Somethin'" | 1998 | none | Westside Riderz, Vol. 1 |
| "Bonus Track" | 1998 | none | Westside Riderz, Vol. 1 |
| "Ghetto Life" | 1998 | Steady Mobb'n, Master P | Black Mafia |
| "Light Green and Remy" | 1998 | Steady Mobb'n | Black Mafia |
| "Turn Me Up" | 1998 | Steady Mobb'n | Black Mafia |
| "Gangsta Shit" | 1998 | Full Blooded | Memorial Day |
| "Gangsta Move" | 1998 | none | We Can't Be Stopped |
| "Ghetto Fabulous" | 1998 | Mystikal, Charlie Wilson | Ghetto Fabulous |
| "Let's Go Do It" | 1998 | Mystikal, Silkk the Shocker | Ghetto Fabulous |
| "Get It Up" | 1999 | Silkk the Shocker | Made Man |
| "Gangsta Walk" | 1999 | C-Murder | Bossalinie |
| "Ghetto Millionaire" | 1999 | C-Murder, Kurupt, Nate Dogg | Bossalinie |
| "Don't Be Foolish" | 1999 | Kurupt, Daz Dillinger | Foolish (soundtrack) |
| "Survive" | 1999 | Da Productz, Luniz | Turf Stories (soundtrack) |
| "The War Iz On" | 1999 | Krayzie Bone, Kurupt, Layzie Bone | Thug Mentality 1999 |
| "Life in the Projects" | 1999 | none | The PJs (soundtrack) |
| "Change Gone Come" | 1999 | none | Well Connected |
| "Funkin' Till 2000 Comz" | 1999 | The Gap Band, Kurupt, DJ Quik, Casey Wilson | Y2K: Funkin' Till 2000 Comz |
| "Funkin' Till 2000 Comz" (Millenium Mix) | 1999 | The Gap Band, Kurupt, DJ Quik, Casey Wilson | Y2K: Funkin' Till 2000 Comz |
| "The Shaggy Show" | 1999 | Insane Clown Posse | The Amazing Jeckel Brothers |
| "Hoop Dreams" | 1999 | none | Who U Wit? |
| "Suppose to Be My Friend" | 1999 | TRU, Charlie Wilson | Da Crime Family |
| "It's a Beautiful Thing" | 1999 | TRU | Da Crime Family |
| "White Boyz" | 1999 | T-Bo | Whiteboys (soundtrack) |
| "Doggs Ride" | 1999 | Lil Italy | On Top of da World |
| "We Ain't Hard 2 Find" | 1999 | Lil Italy, Mystikal | On Top of da World |
| "We Will Rock You" | 1999 | none | Fox Sports Presents: Game Time! |
| "You Never Know" | 1999 | Warren G, Phats Bossi, Reel Tight | I Want It All |
| "Throw It Up" | 1999 | Rappin' 4-Tay, Roger Troutman, Tray Deee | Introduction to Mackin' |
| "The Game Is Cold" | 1999 | B-Legit | Hempin' Ain't Easy |
| "Fuck You" | 1999 | Dr. Dre, Devin the Dude | 2001 |
| "Bitch Niggaz" | 1999 | Dr. Dre, Hittman, Six-Two | 2001 |
| "Represent Dat G.C." | 1999 | Kurupt, Daz Dillinger, Soopafly, Tray Deee, Jayo Felony, Butch Cassidy | Tha Streetz Iz a Mutha |
| "Never Gonna Give It Up" | 1999 | Kurupt, Nate Dogg, Tray Deee, Soopafly, Warren G | Tha Streetz Iz a Mutha |
| "Real G's" | 1999 | Funkmaster Flex, Big Kap | The Tunnel |
| "Dangerous MC's" | 1999 | The Notorious B.I.G., Mark Curry, Busta Rhymes | Born Again |
| "Who the Hell Cares" | 1999 | Methods of Mayhem | Methods of Mayhem |

== 2000s ==
List of non-single guest appearances, with other performing artists, showing year released and album name.
| Title | Year | Other performer(s) | Album |
|---|---|---|---|
| "Hell Yeah" | 2000 | WC | WWF Aggression |
| "Souljas" | 2000 | 504 Boyz, RBX | Goodfellas |
| "Sound of My Heart" | 2000 | Easy Mo Bee, Ken, Glaze NY | Now or Never: Odyssey 2000 |
| "Dogg Market" | 2000 | Brotha Lynch Hung | EBK4 |
| "Speak on It" | 2000 | The Comrads | Wake Up & Ball |
| "Concrete Jungle" | 2000 | C-Murder, Goldie Loc, Kokane, Tray Deee | Trapped in Crime |
| "U Can't Fuck with Me" | 2000 | LL Cool J, Xzibit, Jayo Felony | G.O.A.T. |
| "Club 33" | 2000 | Andrew Dice Clay | Face Down, Ass Up |
| "Club 33 (Reprise)" | 2000 | Andrew Dice Clay | Face Down, Ass Up |
| "Get It Together (Million Family March Anthem)" | 2000 | The Lady of Rage, Caviar, Mack 10, Fat Joe, Drag-On, Sincere, Kam | Million Family March |
| "Get Your Mind Right Mami" | 2000 | Jay-Z, Memphis Bleek | The Dynasty: Roc La Familia |
| "Big Pimpin'" | 2000 | Charlie Wilson, Nate Dogg | Bridging the Gap |
| "Intro" | 2000 | Lime Block | Heated |
| "Curious" | 2000 | Doggy's Angels, Nate Dogg | Pleezbaleevit! |
| "Told You So" | 2000 | Doggy's Angels | Pleezbaleevit! |
| "Pleezbaleevit!" | 2000 | Doggy's Angels, Layzie Bone | Pleezbaleevit! |
| "Yac & Koke" | 2000 | Doggy's Angels | Pleezbaleevit! |
| "Ridaz with Me" | 2000 | Doggy's Angels, Morticia | Pleezbaleevit! |
| "Frontline" | 2000 | Doggy's Angels | Pleezbaleevit! |
| "Hoodtraps" | 2000 | Doggy's Angels, Kokane | Pleezbaleevit! |
| "Put Your Hands Up" | 2000 | Doggy's Angels, Soopafly, Kokane, King Lou, Ruff Dogg | Pleezbaleevit! |
| "Pop Your Collar 2 Dis" | 2000 | Doggy's Angels | Pleezbaleevit! |
| "Conditioner" | 2000 | Wu-Tang Clan | The W |
| "Poppin' Them Collars" | 2000 | Master P | Ghetto Postage |
| "D.N.A. (Drugs-N-Alcohol)" | 2000 | Xzibit | Restless |
| "Fuck a Bitch" | 2001 | DJ Clue?, Kurupt | The Professional 2 |
| "Lad of Oz" | 2001 | Kokane | Oz (soundtrack) |
| "I Wish" | 2001 | Silkk the Shocker, Master P | My World, My Way |
| "Hoes" | 2001 | Luke, Daz Dillinger, Kurupt | Somethin' Nasty |
| "Ladies & Gents" | 2001 | Angie Martinez | Up Close and Personal |
| "Gangsta (Love 4 the Streets)" (Remix) | 2001 | Lil' Mo | "Gangsta (Love 4 the Streets)" 12" |
| "Fuck What They Say" | 2001 | none | What's the Worst That Could Happen? (soundtrack) |
| "Jody Meets Rodney (Interlude)" | 2001 | Tyrese | Baby Boy (soundtrack) |
| "Crip Hop" | 2001 | Tha Eastsidaz | Baby Boy (soundtrack) |
| "We from the LBC" | 2001 | Bad Azz | Personal Business |
| "Money 2 Fold" | 2001 | Bad Azz, Kurupt | Personal Business |
| "Dogghouse Ridaz" | 2001 | Bad Azz, Suga Free, Goldie Loc, Kokane | Personal Business |
| "Bring Back That G..." | 2001 | Kurupt, Goldie Loc | Space Boogie: Smoke Oddessey |
| "Dat Whoopty Woop" | 2001 | Soopafly | Dat Whoopty Woop |
| "Smoke" | 2001 | Tha Dogg Pound, The Relativez | 2002 |
| "Every Single Day" | 2001 | Tha Dogg Pound | 2002 |
| "Figadoh" | 2001 | Benzino, Scarface | Rush Hour 2 (soundtrack) |
| "Cruisin'" | 2001 | Jadakiss | Kiss tha Game Goodbye |
| "What Y'all Want" | 2001 | Krazy | Breather Life |
| "Baby's Mama" | 2001 | Babyface | Face2Face |
| "Down South" | 2001 | Most Wanted Boys | Down Bad |
| "How Many Licks?" (Remix) | 2001 | Lil' Kim, Lil' Cease | Invincible |
| "No More Games" | 2001 | Prince Ital Joe, Nate Dogg | Thug Lifestyles |
| "On the Boulevard" | 2001 | Dr. Dre | The Wash (soundtrack) |
| "WCSR" | 2001 | Kid Rock | Cocky |
| "Ditty Dum Ditty Doo" | 2001 | Nate Dogg, Tha Eastsidaz | Music and Me |
| "Yo' Sassy Ways" | 2001 | Warren G, Nate Dogg | The Return of the Regulator |
| "Where the Weed At" | 2001 | Bavgate | The Last Banger |
| "Pop Lockin' II" | 2002 | Daz Dillinger, E-40, Goldie Loc, Master P, Silkk the Shocker, WC | West Coast Bad Boyz, Vol. 3: Poppin' Collars |
| "A Little More Dope 2 Smoke" | 2002 | none | We from the LBC (soundtrack) |
| "Dogged Her Out" | 2002 | none | Tru Dawgs |
| "That's Crazy" (Remix) | 2002 | P. Diddy, Black Rob, Missy Elliott, G. Dep | We Invented the Remix |
| "Sleeping in My Bed" | 2002 | Darius Rucker | Back to Then |
| "Fine" | 2002 | Tray Deee, Lil' ½ Dead | The General's List |
| "Baller's Night Out" | 2002 | Warren G | —N/a |
| "Hey Y'all" | 2002 | Eve, Nate Dogg | Eve-Olution |
| "Gutter Niggaz" | 2002 | The Relativez | The Takeover |
| "U Can't Afford It" | 2002 | The Relativez | The Takeover |
| "West Coast Knock" | 2002 | none | Corporate Thuggin' |
| "Losin' Your Mind" | 2002 | Xzibit | Man vs. Machine |
| "Kings of the Coast" | 2002 | Young Skitz, JT the Bigga Figga | Block Burners |
| "Do It Heavy" | 2003 | T-Nutty, Young Bop | The Last of the Floheakinz |
| "In This Life..." | 2003 | Gang Starr (DJ Premier & Guru), Uncle Reo | The Ownerz |
| "The Shit" | 2003 | The D.O.C., MC Ren, Ice Cube, Six-Two | Deuce |
| "Snoop Shit" | 2003 | The D.O.C. | Deuce |
| "We Get Around" | 2003 | Freeway | Philadelphia Freeway |
| "I Got Game" | 2003 | Nate Dogg, Armed Robbery | Nate Dogg |
| "Up on Things" | 2003 | Fabolous | Street Dreams |
| "Get Ready" | 2003 | Ginuwine, The Rook | The Senior |
| "Girls, Girls" | 2003 | Jamie Kennedy | Malibu's Most Wanted (soundtrack) |
| "Bigg Snoop Dogg Intro" | 2003 | Daz Dillinger | DPGC: U Know What I'm Throwin' Up |
| "Snoopy Collins (Interlude)" | 2003 | Daz Dillinger | DPGC: U Know What I'm Throwin' Up |
| "It's Dat Gangsta Shit" | 2003 | Daz Dillinger | DPGC: U Know What I'm Throwin' Up |
| "Snoop (Interlude): Suck Me" | 2003 | Daz Dillinger | DPGC: U Know What I'm Throwin' Up |
| "Snoop (Interlude): Quit Playin'" | 2003 | Daz Dillinger | DPGC: U Know What I'm Throwin' Up |
| "Snoop (Interlude): Suck Me" | 2003 | Daz Dillinger | DPGC: U Know What I'm Throwin' Up |
| "Kick Some Gangsta Shit" | 2003 | Daz Dillinger | DPGC: U Know What I'm Throwin' Up |
| "DPGC: U Know What I'm Throwin' Up" | 2003 | Daz Dillinger, Goldie Loc | DPGC: U Know What I'm Throwin' Up |
| "I Got Dat Fire" | 2003 | Daz Dillinger, E-White, Uncle Reo | DPGC: U Know What I'm Throwin' Up |
| "Snoop (Interlude): Reminisce" | 2003 | Daz Dillinger | DPGC: U Know What I'm Throwin' Up |
| "I Like" | 2003 | The Isley Brothers, The Pied Piper | Body Kiss |
| "From Round Here" | 2003 | Fiend, Lil Jon | Can I Burn? 2 |
| "Gangsta Shit" | 2003 | Loon | Bad Boys II (soundtrack) |
| "Unjackable" | 2003 | PFFR | United We Doth |
| "Bosses" | 2003 | Down AKA Kilo | California Cowboys |
| "Executives" | 2003 | Playboy W., Lucky 7, Mac Dre | Tha Cold Part |
| "Lifestylez of a Gangsta" | 2003 | Lifestyle, Goldie Loc | Liquid Cocaine |
| "Hoes in My Room" | 2003 | Ludacris | Chicken-n-Beer |
| "Dance with Me" | 2003 | Marvin Gaye | True Crime: Streets of LA soundtrack |
| "Read Your Mind" (Remix) | 2003 | Avant | Icon |
| "Tell It!" (The Remix) | 2004 | RBX, Soopafly, E-White, Kokane | Ripp tha Game Bloody: Street Muzic |
| "Fucked Up" | 2004 | RBX, Daddy V | Ripp tha Game Bloody: Street Muzic |
| "Theses Muthafuckaz" | 2004 | RBX, Daddy V | Ripp tha Game Bloody: Street Muzic |
| "Make U Scream" | 2004 | Cassidy | Split Personality |
| "We Some Dogs" | 2004 | Method Man, Redman, Mr. Porter | Tical 0: The Prequel |
| "Shine" | 2004 | Jadakiss, DJ Quik | Kiss of Death |
| "I Get High" | 2004 | Lloyd Banks, 50 Cent | The Hunger for More |
| "DPG-Unit" | 2004 | Young Buck, 50 Cent, Daz Dillinger, Lloyd Banks, Soopafly | Straight Outta Cashville |
| "She Don't Know My Name" | 2004 | Nelly, Ron Isley | Suit |
| "Westside Story" (Remix) | 2004 | The Game, 50 Cent | Westside Story |
| "We Gon Ride" | 2004 | Special Ed, Wilmer Raglin | Still Got It Made |
| "Bitches Ain't Shit" | 2004 | Lil Jon & The East Side Boyz, Nate Dogg, Suga Free, Oobie | Crunk Juice |
| "Fly Like an Eagle" | 2004 | The Game, WC | You Know What It Is, Vol. 2: Throwin' Rocks At the Throne |
| "Game Over (Flip)" (Remix) | 2004 | The Game, Lil Flip | You Know What It Is, Vol. 2: Throwin' Rocks At the Throne |
| "I Can Change" | 2004 | John Legend | Get Lifted |
| "Pump Ya Brakes" | 2005 | Will Smith | Lost and Found |
| "Smoking on Information" | 2005 | Layzie Bone, M.T.F., Joe Little | It's Not a Game |
| "Happy Summertime" | 2005 | R. Kelly | TP.3 Reloaded |
| "Caviar" | 2005 | Bow Wow | Wanted |
| "Still Ballin'" (Remix) | 2005 | Eddie Cane | Eddie Cane Presents |
| "You Got Nerve" | 2005 | Charlie Wilson | Charlie, Last Name Wilson |
| "Kronik" | 2005 | Lil' Kim | The Naked Truth |
| "Sexy Gurl" | 2005 | Trina, Money Mark Diggla | Glamorest Life |
| "What U Know About Us" | 2005 | Spider Loc, 50 Cent | —N/a |
| "Had to Call" | 2005 | Twista, Sleepy Eyed Jones | The Day After |
| "PYT" | 2005 | Warren G, Nate Dogg | In the Mid-Nite Hour |
| "Yes Sir" | 2005 | Warren G, Bishop Lamont, Frank Lee White | In the Mid-Nite Hour |
| "Get U Down Part 2" | 2005 | Warren G, B-Real, Side Effect, Ice Cube | In the Mid-Nite Hour |
| "Living the Life" | 2005 | The Notorious B.I.G., Faith Evans, Cheri Dennis, Ludacris, Bobby V | Duets: The Final Chapter |
| "With You" | 2005 | Jamie Foxx, The Game | Unpredictable |
| "So Fly" | 2006 | Suga Free, Katt Williams | Just Add Water |
| "So Fly" (Remix) | 2006 | Suga Free, Mannie Fresh, Katt Williams | Just Add Water |
| "You Gotta Lotta That" | 2006 | Ice Cube | Laugh Now, Cry Later |
| "Heavyweights" | 2006 | Tha Dogg Pound | Cali Iz Active |
| "It's Craccin All Night" | 2006 | Tha Dogg Pound, Diddy | Cali Iz Active |
| "Hard on a Hoe" | 2006 | Tha Dogg Pound, Nate Dogg, RBX | Cali Iz Active |
| "It's All Hood" | 2006 | Tha Dogg Pound, Ice Cube, Traci Nelson | Cali Iz Active |
| "Don't Sweat It" | 2006 | Tha Dogg Pound, Nate Dogg, RBX | Cali Iz Active |
| "Face 2 Face" | 2006 | Tha Dogg Pound | Cali Iz Active |
| "She Likes Dat" | 2006 | Tha Dogg Pound | Cali Iz Active |
| "Lights Camera Action" | 2006 | The Game, Clyde Carson | The Black Wall Street Journal, Vol. 1 |
| "Tell Yo Momma" (Remix) | 2006 | Jay Rock, K-Dot | Watts Finest Vol. II: The Nickerson Files |
| "DPG Fo' Life" | 2006 | Daz Dillinger, Soopafly | So So Gangsta |
| "Pose" | 2006 | Justin Timberlake | FutureSex/LoveSounds |
| "It's Okay (One Blood)" (Remix) | 2006 | The Game, Jim Jones, Nas, T.I., Fat Joe, Lil Wayne, N.O.R.E., Jadakiss, Styles P, Fabolous, Juelz Santana, Rick Ross, Twista, Kurupt, Daz Dillinger, WC, E-40, Bun B, Chamillionaire, Slim Thug, Young Dro, Clipse, Ja Rule, Junior Reid | —N/a |
| "It's Okay (One Blood West Coast Remix)" | 2006 | The Game, Tha Dogg Pound, WC, E-40, Crooked I, Glasses Malone | Mick Boogies - The Dope Game 2 |
| "California Vacation" | 2006 | The Game, Xzibit | Doctor's Advocate |
| "Pac's Life" (Remix) | 2006 | 2Pac, Chris Starr, T.I. | Pac's Life |
| "Get Low" | 2006 | Tyrese, Kurupt, Too Short | Alter Ego |
| "Roll the Dice" | 2006 | Tyrese, Kurupt | Alter Ego |
| "Play on Playa" | 2006 | Nas | Hip Hop Is Dead |
| "Almost Fucked" | 2006 | DJ Clue? | The Professional 3 |
| "Welcome to the Hood of Horror" | 2007 | none | Hood of Horror soundtrack |
| "Shake That Shit" | 2007 | Young Walt, Terrance Martin, Tiffany Fox | Hood of Horror soundtrack |
| "Running Your Mouth" | 2007 | The Notorious B.I.G., Fabolous, Busta Rhymes, Nate Dogg | Greatest Hits |
| "Thou Shall Not Pass" | 2007 | Mobb Deep, Tray Deee | The Infamous Archives |
| "Merry Jane" | 2007 | Redman, Nate Dogg | Red Gone Wild: Thee Album |
| "Pull Ya Drawz Down" | 2007 | Tha Dogg Pound | Dogg Chit |
| "I Ain't Fuckin' Wit U!" | 2007 | Young Buck, Trick Daddy | Buck the World |
| "Everybody Know Me" | 2007 | Paul Wall | Get Money, Stay True |
| "The G Way" | 2007 | Down AKA Kilo | Definition of an Ese |
| "In It for the Money" | 2007 | Lumidee | Unexpected |
| "Number 1" | 2007 | Soopafly, Nate Dogg, Daz Dillinger | Bangin Westcoast |
| "Talented" | 2007 | Soopafly | Bangin Westcoast |
| "Happy I Met You" | 2007 | The Foundation | It's Whateva |
| "Dodgeball" | 2007 | WC, Butch Cassidy | Guilty by Affiliation |
| "Brand New" | 2007 | Yung Joc, Rick Ross | Hustlenomics |
| "The Donque Song" | 2007 | will.i.am | Songs About Girls |
| "Bang It Out" | 2007 | Papoose | Already a Legend |
| "Walka Not a Talka" | 2007 | Mýa | Liberation |
| "Hi-Definition" | 2007 | Lupe Fiasco, Pooh Bear | Lupe Fiasco's The Cool |
| "Calling Mumia" | 2007 | Robert Del Naja (Massive Attack) | —N/a |
| "Vibe Wit a Pimp" (Shawty Redd Remix) | 2008 | Tha Dogg Pound | Let's Ryde 2Night EP |
| "Xmas Seasons" | 2008 | Tha Dogg Pound, Nate Dogg | Let's Ryde 2Night EP |
| "Old School" | 2008 | Lyfe Jennings | Lyfe Change |
| "Driving Down the Freeway" (G-Mix) | 2008 | Young Buck, The Outlawz, Stormey | Cashville Takeover |
| "Me & My Cuzzin" | 2008 | Daz Dillinger | Only on the Left Side |
| "Survive" | 2008 | Numskull, Da Productz | Hear This!! |
| "LA" | 2008 | Nelly, Nate Dogg | Brass Knuckles |
| "Time Is Now" | 2008 | Murs | Murs for President |
| "I Don't Chase 'Em" | 2008 | Devin the Dude | Landing Gear |
| "Do It Right" (Remix) | 2008 | Keak da Sneak, Baby S, Q-Z | Word Pimpin 2: We Don't Need You |
| "Pain No More" | 2008 | E-40, Game | The Ball Street Journal |
| "Act Like It" | 2008 | T.I. | Southern Smoke 32 |
| "Attention" | 2008 | Avant | Avant |
| "Holla If You Hear Me" | 2009 | T.I., Wyclef Jean | —N/a |
| "Let It Out" | 2009 | Charlie Wilson | Uncle Charlie |
| "Dr. Hyphenstein" | 2009 | B-Real, Young De, Trace Mida | Smoke N Mirrors |
| "Steal Your Mind" | 2009 | UGK, Too Short | UGK 4 Life |
| "Let's Get High" | 2009 | Bizzy Bone, Malow Mac, Miss Lady Pinks | Back with the Thugz |
| "Dove of Peace" | 2009 | Sacha Baron Cohen, Bono, Elton John, Chris Martin, Sting, Slash | Brüno soundtrack |
| "Bang Bang" | 2009 | La Coka Nostra | A Brand You Can Trust |
| "Awesome" | 2009 | Gucci Mane | The Movie Part 2: The Sequel |
| "Three of the Best from the West" | 2009 | Mr. Capone-E, Game | Diary of a G |
| "So Sexy" | 2009 | Down AKA Kilo, Fingazz | Cholo Skate |
| "Come Roll with Me" | 2009 | C-Murder, Jahbo | Calliope Click Volume 1 |
| "Swagger Rich" | 2009 | Warren G, Cassie Davis | The G Files |
| "Before It All Ends" | 2009 | Glasses Malone, Jay Rock | Nightmare on Seven Street |
| "Domestic Dispute" | 2009 | Mike Epps | Funny Bidness: Da Album |
| "Livin' It Up" | 2009 | Shwayze | Let It Beat |
| "Rollin' N a Drop Top" | 2009 | Tha Dogg Pound, A-Dubb | That Was Then, This Is Now |
| "Guess Who's Back?" | 2009 | Crooked I | Mr. Pigface: Weapon Waist |

== 2010s ==
List of non-single guest appearances, with other performing artists, showing year released and album name.
| Title | Year | Other performer(s) | Album |
|---|---|---|---|
| "We Are the World 25 for Haiti" | 2010 | Quincy Jones, Lionel Richie, Mervyn Warren, Justin Bieber, Nicole Scherzinger, Jennifer Hudson, Jennifer Nettles, Josh Groban, Tony Bennett, Mary J. Blige, Toni Braxton, Michael Jackson, Janet Jackson, Barbra Streisand, Miley Cyrus, Enrique Iglesias, Jamie Foxx, Wyclef Jean, Adam Levine, Pink, BeBe Winans, Usher, Celine Dion, Orianthi, Fergie, Nick Jonas, Mary Mary, T.I., Isaac Slade, Carlos Santana, Lil Wayne, Akon, T-Pain, LL Cool J, will.i.am, Nipsey Hussle, Busta Rhymes, Swizz Beatz, Iyaz, Mann, Kanye West, Patti Austin, Philip Bailey, Il Volo, Fonzworth Bentley, Bizzy Bone, El DeBarge, Ethan Bortnick, Brandy Norwood, Jeff Bridges, Zac Brown, Kristian Bush, Natalie Cole, Harry Connick Jr., Nikka Costa, Larry Dvoskin, Faith Evans, Melanie Fiona, Sean Garrett, Tyrese Gibson, Anthony Hamilton, Keri Hilson, Kid Cudi, John Legend, Julianne Hough, India Arie, Randy Jackson, 3T, Bobby McFerrin, Al Jardine, Jimmy Jean-Louis, Ralph Johnson, Joe Jonas, Kevin Jonas, Rashida Jones, Gladys Knight, Benji Madden, Joel Madden, Katharine McPhee, Jason Mraz, Mya, Freda Payne, A. R. Rahman, RedOne, Nicole Richie, Raphael Saadiq, Chico DeBarge, Trey Songz, Musiq Soulchild, Jordin Sparks, Robin Thicke, Rob Thomas, Vince Vaughn, Mervyn Warren, Verdine White, Ann Wilson, Brian Wilson, Nancy Wilson | —N/a |
| "I Do My Thing" | 2010 | Kid Cudi | —N/a |
| "Welcome to the World of the Plastic Beach" | 2010 | Gorillaz, Hypnotic Brass Ensemble | Plastic Beach |
| "Anotha Killin'" | 2010 | Brotha Lynch Hung, Tha Dogg Pound | Dinner and a Movie |
| "Can't Stop the Boss" | 2010 | E-40, Too Short, Jazze Pha | Revenue Retrievin': Night Shift |
| "All That I Want" | 2010 | Kurupt, J. Black | Streetlights |
| "I'm Burnt" (Remix) | 2010 | Kurupt, Roscoe, Problem | Streetlights |
| "Bounce, Rock, Skate" (Kurupted Mix) | 2010 | Kurupt, DJ Drama, DJ Quik, Terrace Martin | Streetlights |
| "Bickin' It" | 2010 | YG | The Real 4Fingaz |
| "Seat Change" | 2010 | Currensy | Pilot Talk |
| "Trading Places" | 2010 | Game | Brake Lights |
| "Let It Go" | 2010 | Ai | The Last Ai |
| "Say Yeah" | 2010 | Shawty Lo | Bowen Home Carlos |
| "Fly Azz Fucc" | 2010 | Tha Dogg Pound, The Lady of Rage | 100 Wayz |
| "U Should Know Better" | 2010 | Robyn | Body Talk Pt. 2 |
| "It's on Tonight" | 2010 | Maino | The Art of War |
| "Pass Out" (Snoop Remix) | 2010 | Tinie Tempah | Disc-Overy |
| "Toot It and Boot It" (Remix) | 2010 | YG, Tydollasign, Too Short | —N/a |
| "Like Gangstas" | 2010 | Jim Jones, Rell | Capo Life |
| "Baby Mamma" | 2010 | Jim Jones, Cam'ron | Capo Life |
| "Hold On" | 2010 | Stay Sly | Anutha World |
| "Good Life" | 2010 | Slim the Mobster | South Central's Finest |
| "Get the Funk Out of My Face" | 2010 | Quincy Jones | Q: Soul Bossa Nostra |
| "In tha Cadillac" | 2010 | Daz Dillinger | Matter of Dayz |
| "Nate Dogg Dedication" | 2011 | Butch Cassidy | I'm Here |
| "So Gangsta" | 2011 | Butch Cassidy | I'm Here |
| "Keep on Ridin'" | 2011 | Butch Cassidy, DPG | I'm Here |
| "In My '64" | 2011 | Game, Pharrell | Purp & Patron |
| "Purp & Yellow" (Skeetox Remix) | 2011 | Game, Wiz Khalifa | Purp & Patron |
| "Knockin'" | 2011 | Travis Barker, Ludacris, E-40, Dev | Give the Drummer Some |
| "Things We Do" | 2011 | Play-N-Skillz | —N/a |
| "Set It Off" | 2011 | Daz Dillinger | D.A.Z. |
| "Hip Hop @ Funk U" | 2011 | Bootsy Collins, Ice Cube, Chuck D | Tha Funk Capital of the World |
| "Pornographic" | 2011 | Tech N9ne, E-40, Krizz Kaliko | All 6's and 7's |
| "Winning" | 2011 | Charlie Sheen | —N/a |
| "The Motto (Remix)" | 2011 | Nipsey Hussle, Y.G. | —N/a |
| "Come Smoke with Me, Pt. 4" | 2011 | Bow Wow | Greenlight 4 |
| "Drug Test" | 2011 | Game, Dr. Dre, Sly | The R.E.D. Album |
| "Eastsidin'" | 2011 | Glasses Malone, Nipsey Hussle | Beach Cruiser |
| "Wannabe" (Remix) | 2011 | Staind | Staind |
| "Who da Neighbours" (Remix) | 2011 | Juicy J | —N/a |
| "NY NY LA LA" | 2011 | Lil Mama | —N/a |
| "Can't Stop" | 2011 | Mayer Hawthorne | How Do You Do |
| "Don't Kiss Me" (Remix) | 2011 | Carl Thomas | Conquer |
| "What Goes Up" | 2011 | Slim the Mobster | War Music |
| "Real Woman" | 2011 | Betty Wright, The Roots | Betty Wright: The Movie |
| "Higher Learning" | 2011 | Young Jeezy, Devin the Dude, Mitchelle'l | Thug Motivation 103: Hustlerz Ambition |
| "Hey Girl" | 2011 | Terrace Martin, J. Black | Here, My Dear |
| "Cheat" | 2011 | Terrace Martin, Problem | Here, My Dear |
| "Be the One" | 2012 | Raheem DeVaughn | Destination Loveland |
| "Respect the Pimpin'" | 2012 | Too Short | No Trespassing |
| "Gone (La Dada Di)" | 2012 | Melanie Fiona | The MF Life |
| "The Game" (UK version) | 2012 | Alyssa Reid | —N/a |
| "What You Smokin' On" | 2012 | E-40, Tha Dogg Pound, Kokane | The Block Brochure: Welcome to the Soil 3 |
| "Pocket Like It's Hot" | 2012 | DeStorm Power, Andy Milonakis | —N/a |
| "When My Niggas Come Home" | 2012 | Game, Pharrell | California Republic |
| "Roll My Shit" | 2012 | Game, Pharrell | California Republic |
| "Bad Mutha" | 2012 | Verse Simmonds | Sex, Love & Hip Hop |
| "Funny Hoes" | 2012 | Mac Lucci | The Pre-Hustle 2 |
| "Homicide" | 2012 | Future | Pluto |
| "Story By Snoop Lion" | 2012 | Big Sean | Detroit |
| "Make It Hot" | 2012 | Tha Dogg Pound | DPGC'ology |
| "Bouncin'" | 2012 | Tha Dogg Pound, Dom Kennedy | DPGC'ology |
| "4ever N a Day" | 2012 | Tha Dogg Pound | DPGC'ology |
| "Shit Don't Change" | 2012 | DMX | The Weigh In |
| "Want U Back (Remix feat. Snoop Dogg)" | 2012 | Cher Lloyd | |
| "Roll Me Up and Smoke Me When I Die" | 2012 | Willie Nelson, Kris Kristofferson, Jamey Johnson | Heroes |
| "Californication" | 2012 | David Banner, Game, Nipsey Hussle, Ras Kass, Kree | Sex, Drugs & Video Games |
| "Remain Calm" | 2012 | 50 Cent, Precious Paris | The Lost Tape |
| "Got It" | 2012 | Boys Noize | Out of the Black |
| "So Blowed" | 2012 | B.o.B | Fuck 'Em We Ball |
| "My Money" | 2012 | Kid Red | REDemption |
| "Smokin' Chokin'" | 2012 | MJG, 8Ball | Bitches Money Guns |
| "L.A. Here's 2 U" | 2013 | Tha Dogg Pound | —N/a |
| "Grown Ass Man" | 2013 | Bow Wow | Greenlight 5 |
| "R.I.P." (Remix) | 2013 | Young Jeezy, Too Short, E-40 | —N/a |
| "Good Luv" | 2013 | Justin Anthony | —N/a |
| "We Came to Party" | 2013 | LL Cool J, Fatman Scoop | Authentic |
| "Bartender Please" | 2013 | LL Cool J, Bootsy Collins, Travis Barker | Authentic |
| "Do the Damn Thang" | 2013 | Ralph Myerz, George Clinton, Nipsey Hussle, Da YoungFellaz, Nicki Noelle | Supersonic Pulse |
| "Fuck What Happens Tonight" | 2013 | French Montana, DJ Khaled, Mavado, Ace Hood, Scarface | Excuse My French |
| "Roll Up" | 2013 | Problem, T.I. | The Separation |
| "Persevere” | 2013 | Lupe Fiasco, Robert Glasper | Black Radio 2 |
| "Stay Out the Way" | 2013 | Daz Dillinger, WC | West Coast Gangsta Shit |
| "Put in Work" | 2013 | Chanel West Coast, Evan Ross | Now You Know |
| "I'm for Real" | 2013 | Terrace Martin, Lalah Hathaway | 3ChordFold |
| "84" | 2013 | Ro James | Cadillacs |
| "C'est Party!" | 2013 | Froggy Mix | —N/a |
| "Blame It on the Money" | 2013 | D'banj, Big Sean | D'Kings Men |
| "All for You" | 2014 | French Montana, Lana Del Rey (Voice Sampled), Wiz Khalifa | Coke Boys 4 |
| "Get Down" | 2014 | Mobb Deep | The Infamous Mobb Deep |
| "I Forgot to Be Your Lover" | 2014 | William Bell, Stax Music Academy | Take Me to the River: Music from the Motion Picture |
| "Meowpurrdy" | 2014 | Killer Mike, El-P, Lil Bub, Maceo, Delonte | Meow the Jewels |
| "Dead Man's Tetris" | 2014 | Flying Lotus, Captain Murphy | You're Dead! |
| "All The Way (Pimp Hop)" | 2014 | Statik Selektah, Wais P, Ransom, CharlieRED | What Goes Around |
| "6 in the Morning" | 2014 | Raven Felix | Valifornia |
| "Quintessential" | 2014 | Rick Ross | Hood Billionaire |
| "Let's Go Get Stoned" | 2014 | Terrace Martin | 3ChordFold: Pulse |
| "The Position" | 2014 | MacShawn100, Ice Cube | The Position |
| "Want It" | 2015 | Lil Scrappy | Merlo's Way |
| "Institutionalized" | 2015 | Kendrick Lamar, Bilal, Anna Wise | To Pimp a Butterfly |
| "Youth Dem (Turn Up)" | 2015 | Steve Aoki | Neon Future II |
| "Winter Wonderland/Here Comes Santa Claus" | 2015 | Anna Kendrick | Pitch Perfect 2 soundtrack |
| "1,2 1,2" | 2015 | Raekwon | Fly International Luxurious Art |
| "One Shot One Kill" | 2015 | Jon Connor | Compton: A Soundtrack by Dr. Dre |
| "Satisfaction" | 2015 | Dr. Dre, Marsha Ambrosius, King Mez | Compton: A Soundtrack by Dr. Dre |
| "Rolling" | 2015 | K Camp | Only Way Is Up |
| "Addicted" | 2015 | TeeFlii, DJ Quik | Starr |
| "Ole Ole" | 2015 | Ljupka Stevic | —N/a |
| "LA" | 2015 | The Game, will.i.am, Fergie | The Documentary 2 |
| "Neva Met" | 2015 | Rick Rock, TeeFlii | Rocket |
| "The Business" | 2016 | KidWhiz, Kurupt | The Start of the Beginning |
| "Best Thang Smokin" | 2016 | Berner, Wiz Khalifa, B-Real | Hempire |
| "Ahh Shit Gah Damn" | 2016 | Kool John, IAMSU! | —N/a |
| "Oh Yeah" | 2016 | The Game, Lamar Odom, Joe Smith | Full Court Press: Vol.1 |
| "Ride with the Rhythm" | 2016 | Rappin' 4 Tay, G. Battles | —N/a |
| "King" | 2016 | Amitis | —N/a |
| "Morals" | 2016 | Smoke DZA | He Has Risen |
| "Can't You Tell" | 2016 | James Wade, Dead Prez, Chase Los Angeles | —N/a |
| "Phenomenal" | 2016 | It's K.I. | —N/a |
| "No Pressure" | 2016 | J Boog | Rose Petals |
| "Don't Go" | 2016 | Kokane | King of G Funk |
| "Lil' & Big Homie" | 2016 | Pilot | —N/a |
| "So Cold" | 2016 | Jooba Loc, Kokane | Only Way Out |
| "Ghetto Boy" | 2016 | Lalah Hathaway, Robert Glasper | —N/a |
| "California" (Remix) | 2016 | Colonel Loud, Too Short, Ricco Barrino | —N/a |
| "Beach City" (Part 2) | 2016 | LBC Movement Ladies | —N/a |
| "Let Me Hit It" (Contrvbvnd Remix) | 2016 | Docka | —N/a |
| "All or Nothing" | 2016 | DCat | —N/a |
| "Lighters Up" | 2016 | Walk off the Earth | —N/a |
| "Handle It" | 2016 | Flahdeah | —N/a |
| "Gotta Be Real" | 2016 | Iza Lach | —N/a |
| "#WHERESTHELOVE" | 2016 | The Black Eyed Peas, Justin Timberlake, Jamie Foxx, Ty Dolla Sign, Mary J. Blige, Sean Combs, Cassie Ventura, Andra Day, The Game, Tori Kelly, V. Bozeman, Jessie J, French Montana, DJ Khaled, Usher, Nicole Scherzinger, ASAP Rocky, Jaden Smith, Connie Britton, Lance Bass, Rosario Dawson, Shailene Woodley, Taye Diggs, Kareem Abdul-Jabbar, Quincy Jones, Olivia Munn, Jhené Aiko, Krewella, Wiz Khalifa, Charlie Carver, Ian Harding, Max Carver, Daniel Sharman, Vanessa Hudgens, Russell Westbrook, Carla Gugino, DJ Khaled, Ben Barnes, Nikki Reed, Omarion, Jessica Szohr, LL Cool J, Ryan Guzman, Adrianne Palicki, Becky G, Adrienne Bailon, Kris Jenner, Kendall Jenner | —N/a |
| "Lift Me Up" | 2016 | Lotus, Honorebel | —N/a |
| "Jealous" | 2016 | Young Sagg | —N/a |
| "Leavin the Club" | 2016 | Calico Jonez, David Gray | —N/a |
| "Dip U Low" | 2016 | G-Wizard, Tenzin | —N/a |
| "Want To" | 2016 | Forever M.C., Lox Chatterbox | —N/a |
| "Hold Up" | 2016 | Big Tray Deee, Supafly | —N/a |
| "Blow" | 2016 | Jacky Greco, Arlissa, Jakkcity | —N/a |
| "Smoke Suffa" | 2016 | Nef the Pharaoh | —N/a |
| "When the Dog's Off His Leash" | 2016 | Pat Riot | —N/a |
| "N's Up" | 2016 | Jooba Loc | —N/a |
| "Skip Skip" | 2016 | Jooba Loc | —N/a |
| "Eastside Party" | 2016 | Therese Marie | —N/a |
| "Ground Rules" | 2016 | Trae tha Truth, Mozzy | —N/a |
| "Personal" | 2016 | AV | —N/a |
| "The Anthem" | 2016 | The White Shadow of Norway, KRS-One, Keith Murray | —N/a |
| "Mind Ya Own" | 2016 | Cold 187um | —N/a |
| "The Anthem" (Extended Remix) | 2016 | The White Shadow of Norway, KRS-One, Keith Murray, Mark Deez, BURNTmd | —N/a |
| "Throw It Up" | 2016 | AV, Problem, Slim 400 | —N/a |
| "Fall Bacc" | 2016 | Jooba Loc | —N/a |
| "Gangsta Boogie" | 2016 | J Dilla, Kokane | The Diary |
| "Hit the Gas" | 2016 | Raven Felix, Nef the Pharaoh | Meet the Blacks Official Soundtrack |
| "Roll It Up" | 2016 | Webbie | Savage Life V |
| "Black Hollywood" | 2016 | Mistah F.A.B., Too Short, Bobby V | Son of a Pimp Pt. 2 |
| "Pain" | 2016 | De La Soul | And the Anonymous Nobody... |
| "Go 4 It" | 2016 | Corey Feldman | Angelic 2 the Core |
| "Question #1" | 2016 | Nipsey Hussle | Slauson Boy 2 |
| "How The Game Goes" | 2016 | Problem | Hotels 2: The Master Suite |
| "Lavender" (Remix) | 2017 | BADBADNOTGOOD, Kaytranada | —N/a |
| "Beach City Rollin" | 2017 | Ladies of Beach City | —N/a |
| "When We Party" | 2017 | Faith Evans, The Notorious B.I.G. | The King & I |
| "Get Wit It" | 2017 | Big Boi | BOOMIVERSE |
| "Get High" | 2017 | Young Thug, Lil Durk | Beautiful Thugger Girls |
| "Holiday" | 2017 | Calvin Harris, John Legend, Takeoff | Funk Wav Bounces Vol. 1 |
| "Country'n'Proud" | 2017 | Clay James | Trill Spill |
| "Out Chea" | 2017 | Clay James | Trill Spill |
| "Going Down" | 2017 | DJ Funky, Deraj, Dat Guy | —N/a |
| "Take a Flight" | 2017 | Martellus Bennett | —N/a |
| "Smoke a Blunt" | 2017 | Afroman | —N/a |
| "True Story" (Part 2) | 2017 | Jooba Loc | —N/a |
| "45" | 2017 | Marcus, David Banner | —N/a |
| "Let Me Go" (Nick Peloso Mix) | 2017 | FABIO2U | —N/a |
| "Oops My Bad" | 2017 | Young Sagg | —N/a |
| "Dimes Only" | 2017 | DJ Polique, Follow Your Instinct, Jacob Luttrell | —N/a |
| "Life of a G" | 2017 | Big Tray Deee | —N/a |
| "Throw It Up" | 2017 | Compton AV, Slim400 | —N/a |
| "Stack Up" | 2017 | Lexini Blanco | —N/a |
| "Mr. Weedman" | 2017 | Juelz Santana, Wiz Khalifa | —N/a |
| "Still Palm Trees" | 2017 | Flatbush Zombies | —N/a |
| "Don't Disrespect" | 2017 | LaTruth, KZ | —N/a |
| "Get Mine" | 2017 | G-Eazy | —N/a |
| "California" | 2017 | Monday Justice | —N/a |
| "This Is for the Dodgers" | 2017 | DJ Felli Fel, B-Real, Kid Ink, Chino XL, Daz Dillinger, Kid Frost, King Lil G | —N/a |
| "Afterlife" | 2017 | LX Xander, HighRise, Archer Delta | —N/a |
| "Cali Party" | 2017 | Swissivory, C-Tru | —N/a |
| "One Night Stand" | 2017 | Morris Day | —N/a |
| "LBC Dreams" | 2017 | CS | —N/a |
| "Pardon My G" | 2017 | Fashawn | —N/a |
| "Hit Addiction" | 2017 | Binky Womack, RoleModels, Marvin Kujis | —N/a |
| "Best of LBC" | 2017 | Ladies of Beach City | —N/a |
| "Too Much Pressure" | 2017 | Count Bass D | —N/a |
| "Still Fuckin with Ya'll" | 2017 | Reef Wolf, Ill Bill, D Lynch | —N/a |
| "Whipping" | 2017 | Sophia Vegas | —N/a |
| "Everyday" | 2017 | Ladies of Beach City | —N/a |
| "Don't Fuck with Y'all" | 2017 | Dirty Bird Gang | —N/a |
| "East Coast" (Remix) | 2017 | A$AP Ferg, A$AP Rocky, Busta Rhymes, Rick Ross, Dave East, French Montana | —N/a |
| "Doggystyle" | 2017 | Just Brittany | —N/a |
| "Daddy Love" | 2017 | Rion Michael, Mr Cheeks | —N/a |
| "I Luv My Dawgs" (Remix) | 2017 | Kase 1Hunnid, Rick Ross | —N/a |
| "Higher" | 2017 | B. Taylor, Ray J | —N/a |
| "TUFF" | 2017 | Ironik | —N/a |
| "Addy" | 2017 | IAMSU! | —N/a |
| "Danger & Games" | 2017 | none | Nickelodeon Promo |
| "Have a Seat" | 2017 | En Vogue | Electric Cafe |
| "That's My Nigga" | 2017 | Meek Mill, YG | Bright: The Album |
| "Noid" | 2018 | Berner, Devin The Dude | The Big Pescado |
| "Pressure" | 2018 | 52 Savage | —N/a |
| "Bow Down" | 2018 | PKCZ, Yultron, CRAZYBOY | —N/a |
| "Air" (Remix) | 2018 | Vina Love, Kid Capri | —N/a |
| "They Don't Know" | 2018 | DeMarcus Ware, Steven Battey | —N/a |
| "Sorry Bitch" | 2018 | Daz Dillinger, Kurupt | DAZAMATAZ |
| "On the West Side" | 2018 | Crhymes, King Gee, Looselyrics | Thuggery: A Near Death Experience |
| "Do Sumin'" | 2018 | Ball Greezy, Pleasure P | Bae Day 2 |
| "Crew of 3" | 2018 | E.G.O. | —N/a |
| "1 Time" | 2018 | Jacquees, Birdman | Before Anythang |
| "What's The Use?" | 2018 | Mac Miller, Thundercat, Syd | Swimming |
| "Girls Gone Crazy" | 2018 | Forever M.C., It's Different, Kurupt | Forever M.C. |
| "Smoke With Me" | 2018 | J Armz, Juelz Santana, Janay Saxon | —N/a |
| "Song About You" | 2018 | Slim 400 | FOEREALA |
| "Heavy Hittas" | 2018 | V-Town, Frisco Go | —N/a |
| "I Luv My Dawgs" (Remix) | 2018 | Kase 1Hunnid, YD | —N/a |
| "You Gotta Be a Dog" | 2018 | Snap Dogg | Sacrifice |
| "California Party" | 2018 | C-Tru, Lysee J | —N/a |
| Hollywood | 2018 | Gorillaz, Jamie Principle | The Now Now |
| "No Yee Shit" | 2018 | Joe Moses | SUWOP |
| "Let's Get High" | 2018 | Trick Trick, DIEZEL | SmokeGang |
| "Ghetto" | 2018 | Compton AV, Jordan Down, Bad Lucc, Mac Ace, Aaybayb, Big WY | Still Thuggin |
| "Run 2 It" | 2018 | Dru Down, Too $hort | G.P. No P.C. Lock Up |
| "Cali Life" | 2018 | Czar | —N/a |
| "Smile Bitch" | 2018 | Lil Duval, Ball Greezy | —N/a |
| "The Blue" | 2018 | Buddy | Harlan & Alondra |
| "Penthouse" | 2018 | Wiz Khalifa | Rolling Papers 2 |
| "Get Out the Way" | 2018 | Mithril Oreder, G. Battles | —N/a |
| "Saigon Velour" | 2018 | Ghostface Killah, E-40, La the Darkman | The Lost Tapes |
| "Saigon Velour" (Remix) | 2018 | Ghostface Killah, E-40, Tricky | The Lost Tapes |
| "Last Forever" | 2018 | Russ, Rick Ross | Zoo |
| "Tables" | 2018 | Too $hort, 2 Chainz | The Pimp Tape |
| "Lies & Rumors" | 2018 | Matt Fingaz, Kuniva, Chris Rivers | QUINCEAÑERA: MARVELOUS ISH |
| "I Think I Can Fly" | 2018 | Young Dolph | Role Model |
| "Dope Niggaz" | 2018 | Lil Wayne | Tha Carter V |
| "Gucci Flip Flops" (Remix) | 2018 | Bhad Bhabie, Plies | —N/a |
| "Red & Dollars" | 2018 | Zapp, Roger Troutman | Zapp VII: Roger & Friends |
| "This Is California" | 2018 | Hombre, Chag G, Mr. Lil One | The Sickos 2 |
| "Win" (Remix) | 2018 | Jay Rock | —N/a |
| "We On Da Flo" | 2018 | Andy Stokes | Now |
| "Anywhere" | 2018 | Anderson. Paak, The Last Artful, Dodgr | Oxnard |
| "Eastside" | 2018 | Method Man, Intell | Meth Lab Season 2: The Lithium |
| "Brotha Man" | 2018 | A$AP Rocky, Frank Ocean, French Montana | TESTING |
| "Billionaire Style" | 2018 | Big Boy Cash | —N/a |
| "Shaped Extra Juicy" | 2018 | Dr Sej, PRS | —N/a |
| "Ain't Enough Days" | 2018 | Future, Aaliyah | —N/a |
| "Happier" | 2019 | Layke | —N/a |
| "Main Phone" | 2019 | Rick Rock, Stresmatic | Rick Rock Beats |
| "West Coast" | 2019 | Lacrim | Lacrim |
| "Lil Mo Funk" | 2019 | Morris Day | |
| "Fallin Apart" | 2019 | Gold 1 | —N/a |
| "Playas Ball" | 2019 | T.I. | —N/a |
| "Lifestyle" | 2019 | Tom Francis | —N/a |
| "Tirando Onda In L.A." | 2019 | Tubarao Baixada | —N/a |
| "My Friends and I Pt.2" | 2019 | GRiZ, ProbCause | Ride Waves |
| "Onda Diferente" | 2019 | Anitta, Ludmilla, Papatinho | Kisses |
| "Heavy Hittas" (Remix) | 2019 | V-Town, Frisco GO, P. Street | —N/a |
| "AON" | 2019 | MAF976, Donna | —N/a |
| "Earth" | 2019 | Lil Dicky, Justin Bieber, Ariana Grande, Halsey, Zac Brown, Brendon Urie, Hailee Steinfeld, Wiz Khalifa, Kevin Hart, Adam Levine, Shawn Mendes, Charlie Puth, Sia, Miley Cyrus, Lil Jon, Rita Ora, Miguel, Katy Perry, Lil Yachty, Ed Sheeran, Meghan Trainor, Joel Embiid, Tory Lanez, John Legend, Psy, Bad Bunny, Kris Wu, Backstreet Boys, Leonardo DiCaprio | —N/a |
| "Hey Baby" (Intro) | 2019 | Mistah F.A.B., Unc Tha Hunk | Gold Chains & Taco Meat |
| "Wake N Bake" | 2019 | Lil Flip, King Shermo, E.J. Carter | The ConeHeads |
| "No Line" | 2019 | Sheila E. | —N/a |
| "Turn It Up" | 2019 | Diamond D, Case | The Diam Piece 2 |
| "Don't Be Thinking Wit Cho Dick Boy" | 2019 | Suga Free | The Resurrection |
| "Patek" | 2019 | Anuel AA, Ozuna | |
| "Bossmatic" | 2019 | Chief Scrill, Tony Martian, NK | —N/a |
| "Be Nice" | 2019 | The Black Eyed Peas | —N/a |
| "One Love" | 2019 | K2, Rick Ross, DJ Khaled, Kevinho | —N/a |
| "Million Dollars" (Remix) | 2019 | Seth Hirsch, Kid Kali | —N/a |
| "Lolita" | 2019 | Mike Lucas, Simon Beta | —N/a |
| "Unified" | 2019 | Khao, The Game, Nipsey Hussle, Ice-T, Problem, Mozzy, G-Perico, E-40 | —N/a |
| "Hay Trao Cho Anh" | 2019 | Son Tung M-TP | —N/a |
| "Audemars" | 2019 | DJ Babs, Billion Price | L'architecte |
| "So Fly, So Wet" | 2019 | MacShawn100 | —N/a |
| "Friends & Foes" | 2019 | Higher Brothers | —N/a |
| "Back to Earth" (Pop Version) | 2019 | Lucy Hale | Trouble |
| "Home Is Where My Heart Is" | 2019 | CHOC | Trouble |
| "Last Call" | 2019 | J. Stone, Jeremih | The Definition of Loyalty |

== 2020s ==
List of non-single guest appearances, with other performing artists, showing year released and album name.
| Title | Year | Other performer(s) | Album |
|---|---|---|---|
| "My Story" | 2020 | 5ive Mics, T.I. | Ain't No Chill |
| "Gaspar Yanga" | 2020 | D Smoke | Black Habits |
| "Hit the Floor" | 2020 | Rare Essence | —N/a |
| "Jam On" | 2020 | Bootsy Collins | The Power of the One |
| "Tyrna Smoke (Remix)" | 2020 | Jhené Aiko, Chris Brown | Chilombo |
| "Don’t Be Mad At Me (Remix)" | 2020 | Freddie Gibbs, Problem | Coffee & Kush Vol. 1 |
| "Baby So West Coast" | 2020 | Domino | —N/a |
| "Get Down Tonight" | 2020 | Blakkamoore | —N/a |
| "On My California" | 2020 | Tiësto, Shaun Frank, Fontwell | The London Sessions |
| "180 Days" | 2020 | Curren$y, Harry Fraud | The Director's Cut |
| "Luv U" | 2020 | Terrace Martin, Robert Glasper, 9th Wonder, Kamasi Washington, Alex Isley | Dinner Party: Dessert |
| "Sky's the Limit" (Remix) (Sasha Banks Theme) | 2020 | WWE, CFO$ | —N/a |
| "How We Do" | 2021 | Monsta X | The SpongeBob Movie: Sponge on the Run |
| "Take Control" | 2021 | DMX | Exodus |
| "Drones" | 2021 | Terrace Martin, Kendrick Lamar, Ty Dolla Sign, James Fauntleroy | Drones |
| "Friends & Family" | 2021 | Isley Brothers | —N/a |
| "Sunday" | 2022 | Ben Rector | The Joy of Music |
| "Yes We Can Can" | 2022 | G-Eazy, William Bell | Take Me to the River: New Orleans |
| "ETA" | 2022 | Dr. Dre, Anderson .Paak, Busta Rhymes | —N/a |
| "Windows Down" | 2022 | Westside Boogie | More Black Superheroes |
| "Players Ball" | 2022 | Kurupt, C-Mob | Don't Be Stupid |
| "Death Row France" | 2022 | Gizo Evoracci, Baron G | Tesla Coupe DeVille |
| "PiLOT" | 2022 | Domi and JD Beck, Busta Rhymes, Anderson .Paak | Not Tight |
| "Use To Be The Playa" | 2022 | Morris Day | Last Call |
| "Live My Best Life" | 2022 | Calvin Harris, Latto | Funk Wav Bounces Vol. 2 |
| "Chai Tea with Heidi" | 2022 | Heidi Klum | —N/a |
| "If She Ain't Country Remix" | 2022 | Justin Champagne | If She Ain't Country |
| "Eye" | 2023 | Aminé, Kaytranada | Kaytraminé |
| "Don't Text Don't Call" | 2023 | Wiz Khalifa | —N/a |
| "That’s How We Ballin" | 2023 | T-Pain | —N/a |
| "7969 Santa" | 2023 | Drake, Teezo Touchdown | For All the Dogs |
| "Back Again" | 2024 | Benny the Butcher | Everybody Can't Go |
| "Perfect Fantasy" | 2024 | EarthGang, Spillage Village | Perfect Fantasy |
| "Can U Dig That?" | 2024 | DJ Premier | —N/a |
| "The Influencers" | 2024 | Bootsy Collins, Wiz Khalifa, Dave Stewart (Eurythmics), Fantaazma | —N/a |
| "From Here" | 2024 | NxWorries (Anderson .Paak & Knxwledge) | Why Lawd? |
| "Spirit of Cyrus" | 2024 | LL Cool J | The FORCE |
| "She's Sanctified" | 2024 | Ice Cube, October London, E-40, Too $hort | Man Down |
| "Kush" | 2024 | Redman | Muddy Waters Too |
| "Got What You Need" | 2025 | Hit-Boy, Big Hit | Free Big Hit |
| "Momma" | 2025 | October London | —N/a |
| "Oliver & Company" | 2025 | LaRussell, Mike G Beatz | —N/a |
| "Glad To Meet You" | 2025 | Masta Killa, Method Man | Balance |
| "Let It Run" | 2025 | Zac Brown Band | —N/a |
| "Rabbit (Remix)" | 2026 | Kurupt, Masta Killa | The Godbody LP |
| "Love It or Hate It" | 2026 | The Game, Sela V, Cool & Dre | The Documentary III |
| "Knee Deep" | 2026 | Jay Worthy, George Clinton, LNDN DRGS | Generation P |
