= Gambino Family (group) =

American hip hop group

- Left to right: Melchior, Gotti, Pheno and Reginelli

Background information
- Origin: New Orleans, Louisiana, United States
- Genres: Southern hip hop
- Years active: 1997–1999; 2020
- Label: No Limit/Priority
- Past members: Gotti; Melchior; Reginelli; Pheno (deceased)

Gambino Family was an American hip hop group founded by Master P in 1997, named after the Gambino crime family. The group consisted of three brothers; Gotti (Lawrence Johnson; also known as Lil Gotti), Melchior (Melchior Johnson; also known as Malachi), Reginelli (Reginald Johnson), and family friend Pheno (Edward Joseph Bell Jr.; also known as Pheno the Underboss).

== Biography ==
The Gambino Family made their debut mainstream appearance in 1997 on the soundtrack to I'm Bout It on the song "Why They Wanna See Me Dead". After appearing on numerous No limit releases in 1998, including Steady Mobb'n's Black Mafia, Soulja Slim's Give It 2 'Em Raw and Fiend's There's One in Every Family, the group's debut album entitled Ghetto Organized was released on October 20, 1998. Though it found big success on the Billboard charts, peaking at #17 on the Billboard 200 and #3 on the Top R&B/Hip-Hop Albums. In 1999, the group disbanded, though Malachi and Reginelli continued as a duo known as the Young Guns, appearing on Lil Soldiers' Boot Camp and Master P's Only God Can Judge Me in 1999. Their last appearance for No Limit together was on C-Murder's 2000 album Trapped in Crime, though they would appear individually on C-Murder's albums: Reginelli on C-P-3.com in 2001, and Melchior on Tru Dawgs and Screamin' 4 Vengeance in 2002 and 2008 respectively.

== Discography ==
=== Albums ===
List of albums, with selected chart positions
Title	Album details	Peak chart positions	
Title	Album details	US	US R&B
Ghetto Organized	Released: October 20, 1998; Label: No Limit, Priority	17	3

=== Singles ===
==== As lead artist ====
List of singles as lead artist, with selected chart positions and certifications, showing year released and album name
Title	Year	Peak chart positions			Album
Title	Year	US	US R&B	US Rap	Album
"Studio B" (featuring Snoop Dogg & Mo B. Dick)	1998	—	—	—	Ghetto Organized
"Childhood Years" (featuring C-Murder & Porsha)	1998	—	—	—	Ghetto Organized

== See also ==
- No Limit Records
- No Limit Records discography
- Beats by the Pound
