= The Tru Story: Continued =

Compilation album by C-Murder
- Released: September 5, 2006
- Recorded: 2005−2006
- Genre: Gangsta rap, hardcore hip hop
- Label: Koch Records
- Producer: Fiend, Donald "XL" Robertson, KLC, Carlos Stephens

C-Murder chronology
The Truest Shit I Ever Said (2005)	The Tru Story: Continued (2006)	Screamin' 4 Vengeance (2008)

Professional ratings
Review scores
Source	Rating
RapReviews	(6.5/10)

The Tru Story: Continued is the third compilation album by rapper C-Murder. It was released on September 5, 2006, through Koch Records and featured production from former labelmates, Fiend, KLC and Carlos Stephens. The album was a continuation of his previous album, The Truest Shit I Ever Said, and has thus far been his lowest charting album, reaching No. 35 on the Billboard Top R&B/Hip-Hop Albums chart and No. 24 on the Independent Albums chart. This album sold nearly 4680 copies in its first week of release..

== Track listing ==
1. "I Want It" (featuring Lil' Fame of M.O.P.) — 2:59
2. "I Live in the Ghetto" — 4:23
3. "Calliope" — 3:47
4. "On My Block" (featuring Bootleg) — 3:44
5. "I'm That Villain" — 3:57
6. "Die for Mine" (featuring B.G.) — 4:27
7. "Intro" — 1:52
8. "My Life" — 3:50
9. "Skit" — 0:19
10. "Stressin'" — 3:21
11. "Won't Let Me Out" (featuring Akon) — 4:00
12. "Hustla's Wife" (featuring Junie Bezel) — 3:24
13. "Holla @ Me" (featuring Soulja Slim) — 4:18
14. "Skit" — 0:14
15. "Y'all Heard of Me" (featuring B.G.) — 4:43
16. "Betta Watch Me" (featuring Fiend & Popeye) — 4:24
17. "Did U Hold It Down" (featuring Bass Heavy) — 4:36
18. "I Heard U Was Lookin 4 Me" (featuring Montez & Capone) — 4:19
19. "Back Up" — 4:04
20. "Camouflage & Murder" (featuring Mac & Curren$y) — 2:34
21. "Started Small Time" — 3:05
22. "Mama How You Figure" (featuring Ms. Peaches) — 3:27
23. "Outro" — 0:45

== Charts ==
Chart	Position
US Top R&B/Hip-Hop Albums	33
US Independent Albums	24
