= Tru Dawgs =

Compilation album by C-Murder
- Released: April 30, 2002
- Recorded: 2002
- Genre: Hip-hop
- Length: 1:08:50
- Label: D3 Entertainment
- Producer: Bass Heavy; Carlos Stephens; Dani Kartel; Ezell Swang; L.T. Hutton; Suga Bear; Super Dave; XL

C-Murder chronology
C-P-3.com (2001)	Tru Dawgs (2002)	The Truest Shit I Ever Said (2005)

Professional ratings
Review scores
Source	Rating
AllMusic	2/5 stars
HipHopDX	3/5

Tru Dawgs is the first compilation album by American rapper C-Murder. It was released on April 30, 2002 through D3/Riviera Entertainment. Production was handled by Bass Heavy, Carlos Stephens, Dani Kartel, Ezell Swang, L.T. Hutton, Suga Bear, XL and Super Dave, with C-Murder himself serving as executive producer.

It features contributions from Bass Heavy, Big Chan, Bizzy Bone, Curren$y, Da Brat, Jermaine Dupri, Junie Bezel, Keala, Keith Murray, Krazy, Mac, Malachi, Master P, Mia X, Silkk the Shocker, Snoop Dogg, Soulja Slim, Storm, T-Bo, The Real Cut Throat Comitty, Wango and XL.

In the United States, the album peaked at number 67 on the Billboard 200, number 15 on the Top R&B/Hip-Hop Albums and number 4 on the Independent Albums charts.

The compilation marks his last album before he was jailed for murder of a teenager at a nightclub.

== Track listing ==
No.	Title	Producer(s)	Length
1.	"Intro"	Carlos Stephens	1:31
2.	"I'm a Baller" (performed by C-Murder, Mac, T-Bo and XL)	XL	3:51
3.	"Dogged Her Out" (performed by Snoop Dogg)	L.T. Hutton	3:22
4.	"Ain't No Pimpin'" (performed by Big Chan and Storm)	Dani Kartel	4:03
5.	"Water Whipped" (performed by Soulja Slim and The Real Cut Throat Comitty)	Bass Heavy	4:38
6.	"Where the Party At?" (performed by Master P, Silkk the Shocker, Krazy and Bass Heavy)	Ezell Swang; Suga Bear	3:17
7.	"This or That?" (performed by C-Murder and Keala)	Ezell Swang; Suga Bear	3:12
8.	"Respect My Mind" (performed by T-Bo and Malachi)	Bass Heavy	4:48
9.	"Just Like That" (performed by Keith Murray)	L.T. Hutton	4:44
10.	"They Wanna Pay for It" (performed by Mia X)	Bass Heavy; XL	3:46
11.	"Tru Dawgs" (performed by Wango)	Bass Heavy	3:16
12.	"That Ain't Right" (performed by Curren$y and XL)	XL	5:32
13.	"Soulja Down" (performed by Tre-Nitty)	Bass Heavy	3:49
14.	"What's the Reason?" (performed by C-Murder and Keala)	Dani Kartel	3:11
15.	"Front Line Homies" (performed by Bizzy Bone)	L.T. Hutton	4:33
16.	"Got It on My Mind" (performed by Junie Bezel)	Super Dave	3:25
17.	"How a Thug Niggaz Likes It" (performed by C-Murder, Da Brat and Jermaine Dupri)	Carlos Stephens	7:52
18.	"Betya" (performed by C-Murder)
Total length:			1:08:50

== Charts ==
Chart (2002)	Peak position
US Billboard 200	67
US Top R&B/Hip-Hop Albums (Billboard)	15
US Independent Albums (Billboard)	4
