= Down for My N's =

Single by C-Murder featuring Snoop Dogg and Magic

from the album Trapped in Crime and No Limit Top Dogg
- Released: September 27, 1999
- Recorded: 1999
- Genre: Southern hip-hop; gangsta rap; hardcore hip-hop
- Length: 3:45
- Label: No Limit; Priority
- Songwriters: Corey Miller; Cordozar Broadus, Jr; Awood Johnson
- Producer: KLC

C-Murder singles chronology
"Like a Jungle" (1999)	"Down for My N's" (1999)	"They Don't Really Know" (2000)

Snoop Dogg singles chronology
"Game Don't Wait" (1999)	"Down for My N's" (1999)	"Still D.R.E." (1999)

"Down for My N's" (written and stylized as Down 4 My N's on the Snoop Dogg releases) is a song by C-Murder featuring Snoop Dogg and Magic from Dogg's fourth album, No Limit Top Dogg and C-Murder's Trapped in Crime.

== Chart performance ==
Chart (2000)	Peak position
US Bubbling Under Hot 100 (Billboard)	11
US Hot R&B/Hip-Hop Songs (Billboard)	29
US R&B/Hip-Hop Airplay (Billboard)	28

== Remixes ==
A sequel to the song was released on C-Murder's fourth album, C-P-3.com titled "Down 4 My B's". It featured Ms. Peaches, Traci, & Mia X.

== In popular culture ==
- The song is featured in the 2008 film, Street Kings.
- The song was used by the Miami Heat during player introductions.
- The song has become the unofficial anthem of the Alabama Crimson Tide football team.
- Prince Fielder, while he was a member of the Detroit Tigers, used the song as his primary walk up music during home games.
- The song was referenced by Kendrick Lamar in his song "Tammy's Song (Her Evils)" on his debut album Section.80
- The song was performed by Jay–Z and Beyoncé at their On the Run II tour in 2018.
- Its lyrics were referenced by Kanye West on the song Blood on the Leaves from the 2013 album Yeezus.
- The beat was sampled in the 2023 single "Act Up" by American female rapper Dayday.
