= Da Game of Life (film) =

1998 direct-to-video short film starring Snoop Dogg directed by Master P

- Theatrical poster
- Directed by: Michael Martin; Master P Snoop Dogg
- Written by: Regina McLeod; Master P Snoop Dogg
- Produced by: Master P (exec.)
- Starring: Snoop Dogg; Yuri Brown; C-Murder
- Cinematography: Lawrence Hanson
- Edited by: T. David Binns
- Music by: Tommy Coster; Snoop Dogg
- Distributed by: No Limit Films
- Release date: April 21, 1998
- Running time: 35 minutes
- Country: United States
- Language: English

Da Game of Life is a 1998 direct-to-video short drama film starring No Limit Records rapper Snoop Dogg. It was directed by Michael Martin, written and produced by Master P and Snoop Dogg, and distributed by No Limit Films. No Limit labelmate C-Murder co-stars. The movie was also a huge success for No Limit Records and for No Limit Films.

== Cast ==
- Snoop Dogg as Smooth
- C-Murder as Money
- Yuri Brown as Peaches
- Jimmy Keller as Jasper
- Lou Charloff as Don Cottafavi
- WC as bar patron
- Chris Mills as Scooter, basketball player
