= Life or Death (C-Murder album) =

Studio album by C-Murder
- Released: March 24, 1998
- Genre: Southern hip-hop; gangsta rap; G-funk
- Length: 76:43
- Label: No Limit; Priority
- Producer: Master P (exec.); Beats by the Pound; Pimp C

C-Murder chronology
Life or Death (1998)	Bossalinie (1999)

Singles from Life or Death
- 1. "A 2nd Chance" Released: January 14, 1998; 2. "Making Moves" Released: September 4, 1998

Professional ratings
Review scores
Source	Rating
AllMusic	4/5 stars
Rolling Stone	3.5/5 stars
The Source	3.5/5 stars

Life or Death is the debut studio album by American rapper C-Murder. It was released on March 24, 1998, by No Limit Records and Priority Records. It was produced by Beats By the Pound. Like most of No Limit's albums in the 1990s, the album was a success, peaking at number 3 on the US Billboard 200 and at number 1 on the Top R&B/Hip-Hop Albums; as well as at number 21 on the Top Heatseekers. After debuting on the charts with 197,000 copies sold its first week out, Life or Death achieved platinum status, moving over 2 million copies by the end of 1999. In its second week of release, the album charted at number 7 on the Billboard 200, then at number 10 in its third week.

== Track listing ==
1. "Intro" (Produced by O'Dell) — 0:50
2. "A 2nd Chance" (featuring Master P, Silkk the Shocker and Mo B. Dick) (Produced by Beats By the Pound) — 3:34
3. "Akickdoe!" (featuring Master P and UGK) (Produced by Pimp C and Beats By The Pound) — 4:36
4. "Constantly n Danger" (featuring Mia X) (Produced by Craig B) — 3:13
5. "Don't Play No Games" (featuring Mystikal and Silkk the Shocker) (Produced by Craig B) — 3:19
6. "Show Me Luv" (featuring Mac and Mr. Serv-On) (Produced by Mo B. Dick) — 3:34
7. "Picture Me" (featuring Magic) (Produced by Carlos Stephens) — 3:55
8. "On the Run" (featuring Soulja Slim and Full Blooded) (Produced by KLC) — 3:21
9. "Get n Paid" (featuring Silkk the Shocker) (Produced by Craig B) — 2:00
10. "Only the Strong Survive" (featuring Master P) (Produced by O'Dell and KLC) — 2:22
11. "The Truest Sh..." (Produced by Craig B) — 2:39
12. "Making Moves" (featuring Master P and Mo B. Dick) (Produced by Mo B. Dick) — 2:45
13. "Feel My Pain" (Produced by KLC) — 3:55
14. "Soldiers" (featuring Master P, Silkk the Shocker, Fiend, Mac, Mia X, Big Ed, Kane and Abel, and Mystikal) (Produced by KLC) — 5:38
15. "Cluckers" (featuring Fiend) (Produced by Craig B) — 2:42
16. "Life or Death" (featuring Ms. Peaches) (Produced by Mo B. Dick) — 2:55
17. "Where I'm From" (featuring Prime Suspects) (Produced by KLC) — 3:26
18. "G's & Macks" (featuring Silkk the Shocker and Soulja Slim) (Produced by Mo B. Dick) — 4:04
19. "Commercial" (featuring O'Dell and QB) (Produced by O'Dell) — 1:05
20. "Riders" (Produced by KLC) — 2:27
21. "Watch Yo Enemies" (featuring Magic) (Produced by Carlos Stephens) — 3:26
22. "Duck & Run" (featuring Fiend) (Produced by Craig B) — 2:51
23. "Ghetto Ties" (featuring Soulja Slim and Full Blooded) (Produced by Carlos Stephens) — 4:21
24. "Survival of the Fittest" (featuring Gotti of Gambino Family) (Produced by KLC) — 4:00
25. "Dreams" (Produced by KLC) — 1:39
26. "Outro" (Produced by O'Dell) — 0:26

== Charts ==
=== Weekly charts ===
Chart performance for Life or Death
Chart (1998)	Peak position
US Billboard 200	3
US Top R&B/Hip-Hop Albums (Billboard)	1

=== Year-end charts ===
1998 year-end chart performance for Life or Death
Chart (1998)	Position
US Billboard 200	97
US Top R&B/Hip-Hop Albums (Billboard)	25

== Certifications ==
Region	Certification	Certified units/sales
United States (RIAA)	Platinum	1,000,000^{^}
^{^} Shipments figures based on certification alone.

== See also ==
- List of number-one R&B albums of 1998 (U.S.)
