= The Truest Shit I Ever Said =

Studio album by C-Murder
- Released: March 22, 2005
- Recorded: 2004–2005
- Genres: Gangsta rap; hardcore hip-hop
- Length: 53:15
- Labels: TRU; Koch
- Producers: Bass Heavy; Carlos Stephens; Dani Kartel; Donald "XL" Robertson; Fiend; Howard M.; KLC

C-Murder chronology
C-P-3.com (2001)	The Truest Shit I Ever Said (2005)	The Tru Story: Continued (2006)

The Truest Shit I Ever Said is the fifth solo studio album by American rapper C-Murder. It was released on March 22, 2005, via TRU Records and Koch Records. The album was recorded in prison, during visiting hours using a hand held recorder supplied by his lawyer and released on Tru Records. The intro to the album contains audio from interviews with family and friends about him going to jail.

== Background ==
The outro is a dedication to his late fellow rapper Soulja Slim, who had been murdered two years earlier. Slim is featured in "Holla at Me". Incarcerated rapper, Mac appears on the track "Camouflage & Murder" Produced by Donald XL Robertson. Mac was serving time for murder, when the song was recorded. The track "Won't Let Me Out" is a remix of Akon's hit single "Locked Up". The album achieved moderate success due to its lead single "My Life", which was also made into a video and the surprisingly successful hit "Y'all Heard of Me" with fellow New Orleans rapper B.G.

== Critical reception ==
Professional ratings
Review scores
Source	Rating
AllMusic	4/5 stars
RapReviews	6.5/10
Vibe	3/5 stars

Dan Frosch of Vibe commended C-Murder for making tracks that "hearken back to the days of Southern gangsta rap with synthetic, catchy beats and shameless street parables." He concluded that: "Though at times crude and unrefined, The Truest captures some of that Louisiana ghetto soundscape we know and love." Matt Jost of RapReviews wrote: "Despite its musical shortcomings, it's quite possible that this is C-Murder's best album to date. He still lacks a great deal of emotional and rational eloquence, but since he does exhibit considerable insight we ought to cut him some slack there. Last but not least, there's enough variation in subject matter and presentation. Overall this is a solid effort for someone who's locked up."

== Track listing ==
1. "Intro" 1:53
2. "My Life 3:51
3. "Skit" 0:20
4. "Stressin'" 3:21
5. "Won't Let Me Out" 4:01
6. "Hustla's Wife" (featuring Junie Bezel) 3:25
7. "Holla at Me" (featuring Soulja Slim) 4:19
8. "Skit" 0:15
9. "Y'all Heard of Me" (featuring B.G.) 4:43
10. "Betta Watch Me" (featuring Fiend & Popeye) 4:24
11. "Did U Hold It Down" (featuring Bass Heavy) 4:36
12. "I Heard U Was Lookin' 4 Me" (featuring Montez & Capone) 4:19
13. "Back Up" 4:05
14. "Camouflage & Murder" (featuring Mac & Curren$y) 2:35
15. "Started Small Time" 3:06
16. "Mama How You Figure" (featuring Ms. Peaches) 3:27
17. "Outro" 0:45

== Charts ==
Chart (2005)	Peak position
US Billboard 200	41
US Top R&B/Hip-Hop Albums (Billboard)	5
US Top Rap Albums (Billboard)	3
US Independent Albums (Billboard)	1
