= Daddy-O =

Daddy-O may refer to:

- Daddy-O (film) is a 1958 B-movie starring Dick Contino
- Daddy-O Daylie, a radio personality in the 1940s, 1950s and 1960s
- Daddy-O (rapper), rapper and hip hop producer
- "Daddy-O", a 1955 song and 1958 album by Bonnie Lou
- "Daddy-O", a 2008 song by Wideboys
- Bob "Daddy-O" Wade, American artist associated with the Cosmic Cowboy culture of Texas
- Daddy-O, slang usually used to address a person that became popular in the 1950s and 1960s

== See also ==
- Daddy O, Baby O!, a 2000 Filipino film
