= Bossalinie =

Studio album by C-Murder
- Released: March 9, 1999
- Recorded: August 1998– February 1999
- Genre: Hip-hop
- Length: 77:42
- Labels: No Limit; Priority; EMI
- Producers: Ke'Noe; L.T. Hutton; Daz Dillinger; Carlos Stephens

C-Murder chronology
Life or Death (1998)	Bossalinie (1999)	Trapped in Crime (2000)

Singles from Bossaslinie
- 1. "Like A Jungle" Released: 1999; 2. "I Remember" Released: 1999

Professional ratings
Review scores
Source	Rating
AllMusic	2/5 stars
Los Angeles Times	3/4 stars
The Source	3.5/5 stars
USA Today	3/4 stars

Bossalinie is the second studio album by American rapper C-Murder, released by No Limit Records, Priority Records, and EMI on March 9, 1999. It entered the Billboard 200 at number two for the week ending March 14, 1999, after selling over 175,611 in its first week. It stayed on the chart for 11 weeks and was certified Gold by the RIAA. The album features production by Beats By the Pound and guest appearances by Daz Dillinger, Snoop Dogg, Nate Dogg, Kurupt, Monica, Goodie Mob and other No Limit Soldiers.

== Controversy ==
C-Murder was charged by Bridgeport Records and/or Southfield Records with improper use of the musical composition "Flashlight" as an interpolated/sampled portion in "W Balls", whereas the infringement has not been remedied as described in Infringing Compositions and/or Sound Recordings and/or Records.

== Track listing ==
No.	Title	Producer(s)	Length
1.	"Intro"	O'Dell	0:49
2.	"Ghetto Boy" (featuring Mac and Kane & Abel)	Craig B	4:29
3.	"Like a Jungle"	KLC; Master P	3:24
4.	"Gangsta Walk" (featuring Snoop Dogg)	L.T. Hutton	3:14
5.	"Skit"	C-Murder	0:40
6.	"Livin' Legend" (featuring Master P)	Master P	2:50
7.	"Money Talks" (featuring Fiend and Silkk the Shocker)	KLC	3:19
8.	"Street Keep Callin'" (featuring Dez and Monica)	Dez; Dallas Austin	3:11
9.	"Wballs (Skit)"	Daz Dillinger	0:20
10.	"Ghetto Millionaire" (featuring Kurupt, Nate Dogg, and Snoop Dogg)	L.T. Hutton	4:14
11.	"Lord Help Us" (featuring Rico)	Ontario Haynes	4:41
12.	"Bitch Niggas (skit)"	C-Murder	0:52
13.	"On My Enemies"	O'Dell	3:09
14.	"Freedom" (featuring Anita and Porsha)	KLC	4:31
15.	"Lil Nigga" (featuring Master P)	Ke'Noe	3:15
16.	"Murder and Daz" (featuring Daz Dillinger)	L.T. Hutton	4:02
17.	"Piano (skit)"	O'Dell	2:34
18.	"Nasty Chick" (featuring Rico)	Ontario Haynes	3:09
19.	"I Remember" (featuring Magic and Mo B. Dick)	Carlos Stephens	3:48
20.	"Dedication (skit)"	C-Murder; Silkk the Shocker; Master P	0:14
21.	"Where We Wanna" (featuring Goodie Mob)	KLC	3:53
22.	"Don't Wanna Be Alone" (featuring Jazz)	Ontario Haynes	2:37
23.	"Still Makin' Moves" (featuring Master P and Mo B. Dick)	Mo B. Dick	2:40
24.	"Can't Hold Me Back (skit)" (featuring QB)	C-Murder	1:59
25.	"Phone Call (skit)"	C-Murder; Mo B. Dick	0:44
26.	"Ride On Dem Bustas" (featuring Magic and Mr. Serv-On)	Ke'Noe	4:34
27.	"Closin' Down Shop" (featuring Magic and Soulja Slim)	Mo B. Dick	2:53
28.	"Outro"	O'Dell	1:37

== Charts ==
=== Weekly charts ===
Chart (1999)	Peak position
US Billboard 200	2
US Top R&B/Hip-Hop Albums (Billboard)	1

=== Year-end charts ===
Chart (1999)	Position
US Billboard 200	196
US Top R&B/Hip-Hop Albums (Billboard)	59

== Certifications ==
Region	Certification	Certified units/sales
United States (RIAA)	Gold	500,000^{^}
^{^} Shipments figures based on certification alone.

== See also ==
- List of number-one R&B albums of 1999 (U.S.)
