= Tomorrow (C-Murder album) =

Studio album by C-Murder
- Released: June 15, 2010
- Recorded: 2009–2010
- Genres: Gangsta rap, hardcore hip hop
- Length: 51:49
- Labels: TRU Records, Venti Uno

C-Murder chronology
| Calliope Click Volume 1 (2009) | Tomorrow (2010) | Ain't No Heaven In The Pen (2015) |

Tomorrow is the eighth studio album by rapper C-Murder. The album was released on June 15, 2010, under TRU Records & Venti Uno, while he is serving life imprisonment sentence for second degree murder.

== Track listing ==
1. "The Message" — 1:46
2. "The Life Eye Live" (featuring Verse & AR) — 5:10
3. "Snow Bunny" (featuring Verse & Jason Lyric) — 4:02
4. "Tomorrow" (featuring B-Streezy) — 4:43
5. "Message Parlor" (Skit) — 1:59
6. "Bottom of da Boot" (featuring Verse & Dofus) — 4:02
7. "Heartbeat" (featuring Verse) — 3:44
8. "See It in My Eyes" (featuring Von, Holidae & AR) — 4:28
9. "Neva Look Back" — 3:45
10. "How I Live" (featuring Verse) — 4:48
11. "Chinese Restaurant" (Skit) — 0:54
12. "I'm a Problem" (featuring Pukie, Von & Jahbo) — 4:05
13. "Suicide Mission" (featuring Macho & Kis) — 4:38
14. "Make U Cry" — 3:07
15. "Thank You" — 0:38

== Credits ==
Name
T Rhythm
2Saint
ExchangeStudent
