= C-P-3.com =

Studio album by C-Murder
- Released: October 23, 2001
- Recorded: 2001
- Genres: Gangsta rap, hardcore hip hop
- Labels: TRU; Priority
- Producers: C-Murder (exec.); Carlos Stephens (exec.); Donald XL Robertson, L.T. Hutton, K-Lou, Sanchez, Bass Heavy

C-Murder chronology
| Trapped in Crime (2000) | C-P-3.com (2001) | The Truest Shit I Ever Said (2005) |

Singles from C-P-3.com
- 1. "I'm Not Just" Released: 2001; 2. "What U Gonna Do" Released: 2001

C-P-3.com is the fourth studio album by the rapper C-Murder. It was released on October 23, 2001, by TRU Records and Priority Records with production by Bass Heavy, Carlos Stephens, and Donald XL Robertson. It was C-Murder's first album following his departure from No Limit Records. The title of the album is a reference to the Calliope Projects, where the artist grew up. It is also a reference to R.Kelly's TP-2.COM album, released the year before.

== Commercial performance ==
C-P-3.com was not as successful as C-Murder's previous three albums, only peaking at #45 on the Billboard 200 and #10 on the Top R&B/Hip-Hop Albums.

== Singles ==
There were two music videos from the album, "What U Gonna Do" and "I'm Not Just". Both were released in 2002, although the single and radio versions were released in 2001. They were C-Murder's last two music videos before he was arrested in 2002 for allegedly beating and shooting a fan. BET and MTV stopped playing the videos after his arrest.

== Critical reception ==
Professional ratings
Review scores
| Source | Rating |
|---|---|
| AllMusic | 2.5/5 stars |
| Encyclopedia of Popular Music | 3/5 stars |
| Entertainment Weekly | C |
| The Source | 3/5 stars |
| USA Today | 2.5/4 stars |

C-P-3.com received mixed reviews from music critics. Steve Jones of USA Today highlighted the album's serious tone and C-Murder's emphasis on his connection to the streets despite achieving financial success. "This kind of rap album was once commonplace, but in the post-Bling Bling era, it tends to stand out a little more", added the critic. Carlton Wade of The Source wrote: "Although C-P-3.com doesn't break any new ground, it can be praised for its new talent." He believed that C-Murder's "customary subject matter—hangin' on blocks, cookin' crack and sprayin' choppas—lacks the diversification" required to find new listeners. Talking about the production, he said that the album should have included more bass-heavy tracks.

Jason Birchmeier of AllMusic thought that despite the album featuring a variety of artists, "compelling raps are few and far between". Ending his review with a comparison to No Limit albums, he added that musically C-P-3.com differs from them. Evan Serpick of Entertainment Weekly criticized C-Murder's performance, while commending the production by saying that "the gangsta traditionalists show signs of musical evolution".

== Track listing ==
| No. | Title | Producer(s) | Length |
|---|---|---|---|
| 1. | "Start" | Carlos Stephens | 1:33 |
| 2. | "What U Gonna Do?" (featuring Ms. Peaches & Silkk The Shocker) | Donald XL Robertson | 4:01 |
| 3. | "Don't Make Me" (featuring T-Bo Da Firecracker & Reginelli) | Bass Heavy | 3:44 |
| 4. | "I'm Not Just" (featuring Soulja Slim & T-Bo Da Firecracker) | Donald XL Robertson | 3:21 |
| 5. | "Get Bunked, Get Crunked" (featuring Master P, Silkk The Shocker, & T-Bo Da Firecracker) | Donald XL Robertson | 3:09 |
| 6. | "Let Me See" | Sanchez | 4:10 |
| 7. | "Boat Ride - Skit" | C-Murder | 1:10 |
| 8. | "Criminal Minded" (featuring Afficial) | Donald XL Robertson | 3:26 |
| 9. | "Don't Matter" (featuring Erica Foxx) | Bass Heavy | 3:12 |
| 10. | "Young Ghetto Boy" (featuring Ms. Peaches) | Carlos Stephens | 2:48 |
| 11. | "Ya Dig" | K-Lou | 4:19 |
| 12. | "Drive Thru 1 - Skit" | C-Murder | 2:01 |
| 13. | "That's Me" | Bass Heavy, Donald XL Robertson | 3:14 |
| 14. | "Do You Wanna Ride" (featuring Slay Sean, X-Con, & Traci) | Carlos Stephens | 3:37 |
| 15. | "NL Soulja" (featuring New-9 & Wayngo) | Bass Heavy | 2:50 |
| 16. | "Drive Thru 2 - Skit" | C-Murder | 1:01 |
| 17. | "Down for My B's" (featuring Mia X, Ms. Peaches, & Traci) | Donald XL Robertson | 4:19 |
| 18. | "Thug Boy" | LT Hutton | 4:07 |
| 19. | "Projects" (featuring New-9 & Wayngo) | Carlos Stephens | 5:10 |
| 20. | "Finish" | Ke'Noe | 1:22 |

== Chart positions ==
| Chart (2001) | Peak position |
|---|---|
| US Billboard 200 | 45 |
| US Top R&B/Hip-Hop Albums (Billboard) | 10 |
