= Calliope Click Volume 1 =

Calliope Click

Studio album by C-Murder
- Released: September 29, 2009
- Recorded: 2008–2009
- Genre: Gangsta rap, hardcore hip hop
- Label: TRU; RBC
- Producer: Ben Grossi, Bob Grossi, Brian Shafton

C-Murder chronology
Screamin' 4 Vengeance (2008)	Calliope Click (2009)	Tomorrow (2010)

Professional ratings
Review scores
Source	Rating
HipHopDX	2.5/5
XXL	L (3/5)

Calliope Click is the seventh studio album by American rapper C-Murder, released on September 29, 2009 on TRU Records and RBC Records. It was produced by Ben Grossi, Bob Grossi, and Brian Shafton.

== Track listing ==
1. "Intro" — 0:27
2. "I'm Down" — 4:32
3. "No Pressure" (featuring Sincere Sosa & Jason Lyric) — 5:04
4. "It's So Hard" (featuring Jahbo) — 4:54
5. "Real Click" (featuring Holidae & Jason Lyric) — 4:24
6. "100 All Time" (featuring Holidae) — 3:54
7. "Come Roll with Me" (featuring Snoop Dogg & Jahbo) — 4:57
8. "Get It On" (featuring Als & Holidae) — 4:22
9. "Choppers" (featuring Big B & Pukie) — 3:51
10. "N.O. in Me" (featuring Juvenile & B.G.) — 3:59
11. "Hate on Me" (featuring Holidae) — 4:54
12. "The Life I Live" (featuring Jahbo) — 3:03
13. "My Hustle" (featuring Pukie, Sincere Sosa & Jahbo) — 4:50
14. "Real Where I Live" (featuring Macho, Duggum-D & Bop) — 5:20
15. "My City" (featuring M11 & Young Trump) — 5:18
16. "Carrin' da Hawk" (featuring Holidae, Macho & Malachi) — 4:00
17. "Streets Made Me" (featuring Lil' Real One) — 4:37
18. "I Don't Understand" (featuring T'Glok, Yung Milly & Yella) — 4:58

== Charts ==
Chart (2009)	Peak position
US Top R&B/Hip-Hop Albums (Billboard)	68

== Credits ==
Name	Credits
Ben "Cut Flow Dollar" Grossi	Associate Producer
Bob Grossi	Associate Producer
Barbara Pescosolido	Publicity, marketing
Brian Shafton	Associate Producer
