= Donald XL Robertson =

American rapper and producer

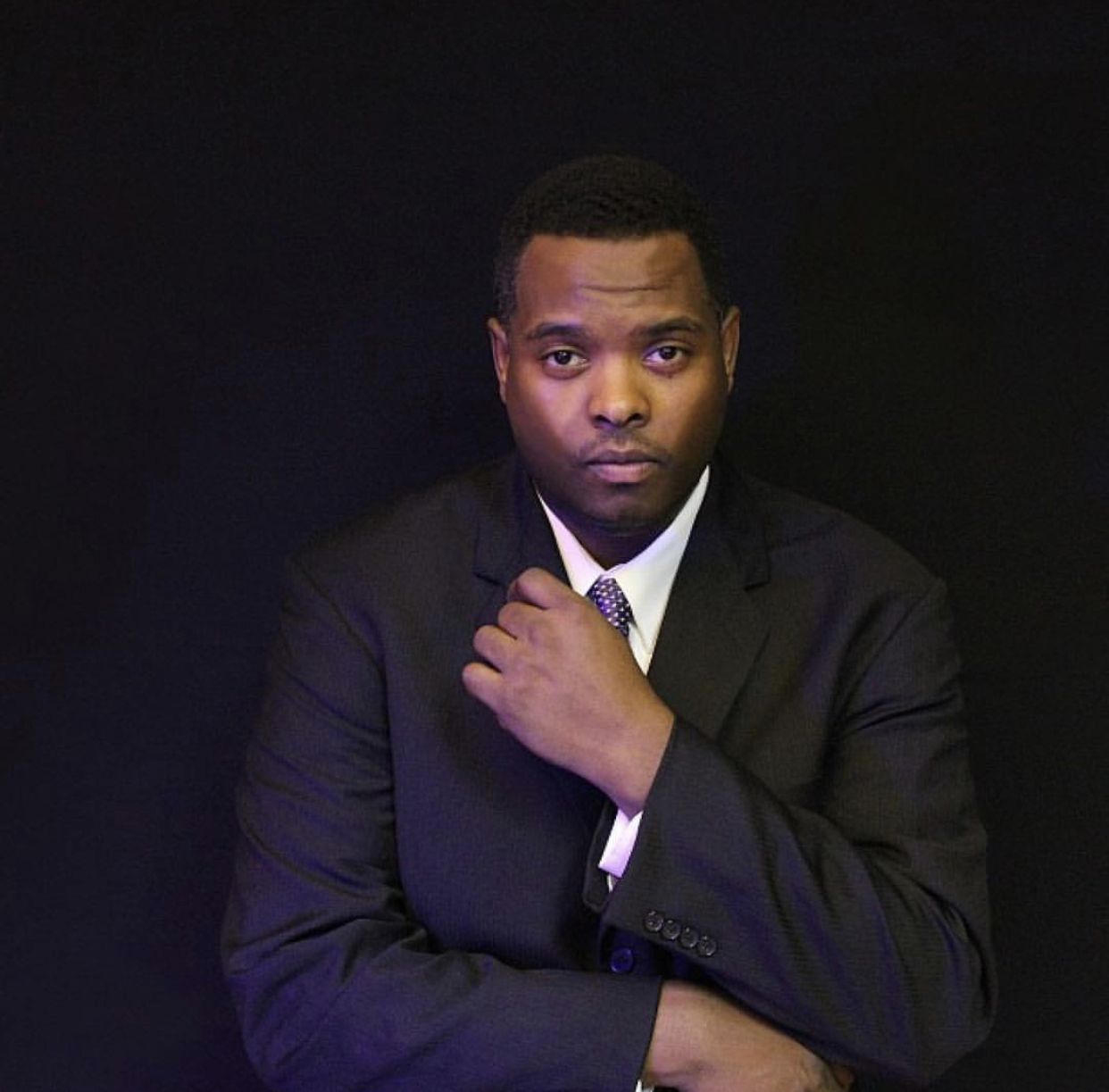

Background information
- Born: Donald Robertson Jr. New Orleans, Louisiana, U.S.
- Genres: Hip hop, Southern hip hop, Lo-fi hip hop, Jazz rap
- Occupations: Record producer, mastering engineer, songwriter, entrepreneur
- Years active: 1997–present
- Labels: XL Productionz, The BeatTape Factory, Sounds Like Tape
- Website: donaldxlrobertson.com xlproductionz.com

Donald XL Robertson is an American record producer from New Orleans, Louisiana. Robertson performed production work during the rise of Southern hip hop in the late 1990s and early 2000s and has collaborated with artists including Master P, Silkk the Shocker, Soulja Slim, Juvenile, Currensy, Mos Def, and Nas.

== Biography ==
Before beginning his production career, Robertson performed under the name Jazzy D and later joined the New Orleans rap group Strictly Business, where he adopted the stage name XL.

In the late 1990s and early 2000s, he produced music for artists associated with No Limit Records and its extended roster, including Master P, Silkk the Shocker, Soulja Slim, C-Murder, and Mac. Robertson produced the Silkk the Shocker single "He Did That", which reached number 3 on the Billboard Hot Rap Singles chart and number 50 on the Billboard Hot R&B/Hip-Hop Singles & Tracks chart. His production credits during the No Limit era also include work appearing on releases by artists including Soulja Slim, C-Murder, 504 Boyz, and Mr. Marcelo. In 2004 Robertson produced the UTP single "Nolia Clap", which peaked at number 31 on the Billboard Hot 100 and reached number 9 on both the Hot Rap Songs and Hot R&B/Hip-Hop Songs charts.

In 2003 Robertson founded XL Productionz, a platform focused on music production, artist development, and digital distribution services. Through the company he has produced and released projects including lo-fi hip hop, chillhop, jazz-influenced instrumentals, and electronic music.

In addition to his production work for other artists, Robertson has released a number of independent instrumental projects exploring jazz, hip hop, and lo-fi production styles, including the 2016 album Self Portrait and the 2022 instrumental album A Village Named Seneca (Jazz Lo-Fi). In 2025 he released The No Limit Records File – An XL BeatTape. The release includes spoken-word drops and references from artists connected to the Southern hip hop scene, including Master P, Mia X, Mac, Romeo Miller, and Kurtis Mantronik.

Robertson has also contributed music to film soundtracks and television projects, including the Freeform comedy series Grown-ish and the OWN Network drama David Makes Man.

== Production discography ==
=== Album productions ===
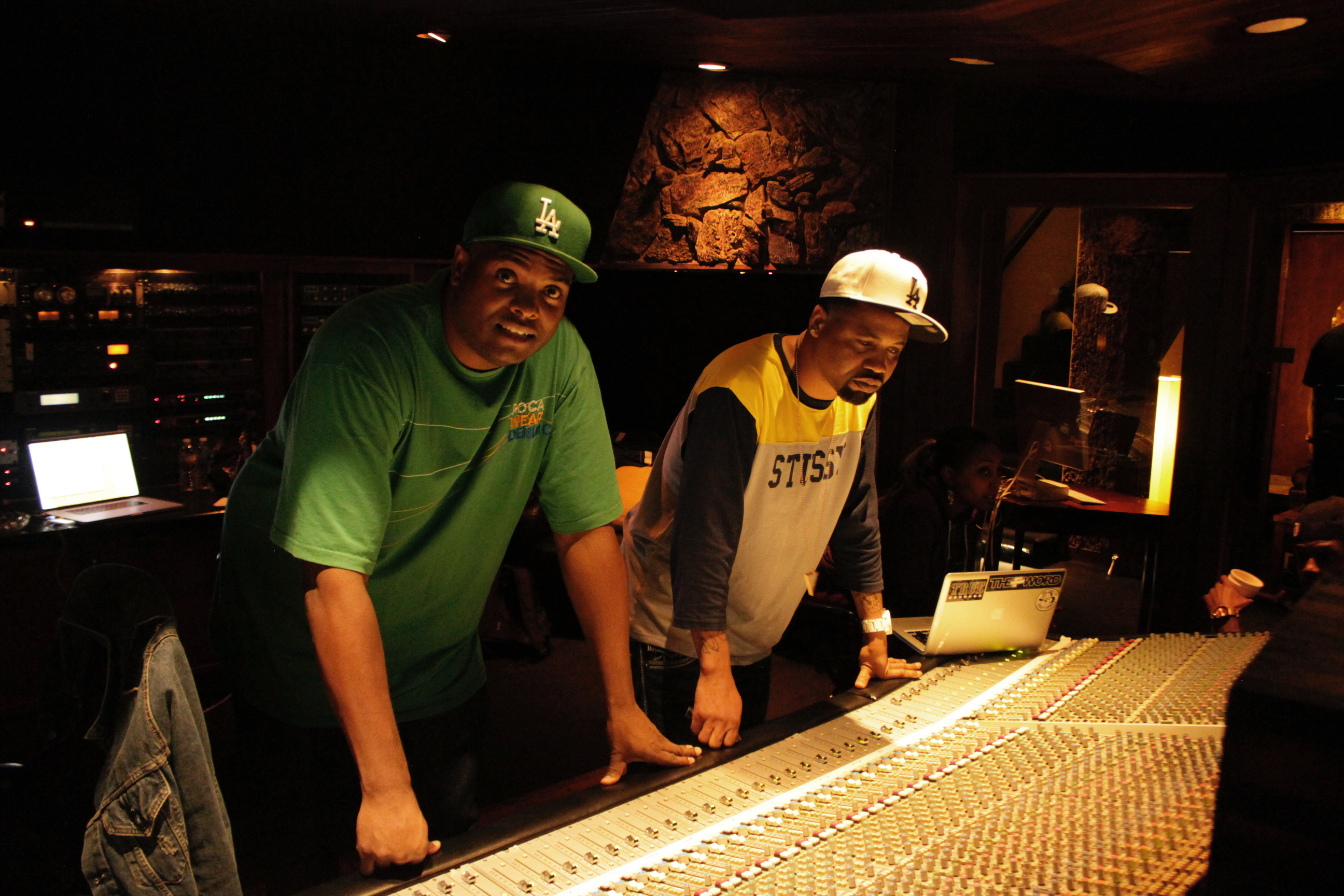
Donald XL Robertson with rapper Juvenile during a studio recording session. Photograph by Lamar Tribble.

Year	Artist	Album	Role	Label
1999	Mac	World War III	Producer	No Limit Records / Priority Records
1999	Master P	Only God Can Judge Me	Producer	No Limit Records / Priority Records
2000	504 Boyz	Goodfellas	Producer	No Limit Records
2000	Master P	Ghetto Postage	Producer	No Limit Records / Priority Records
2000	C-Murder	Trapped in Crime	Producer	No Limit Records / Priority Records
2000	Mr. Marcelo	Brick Livin'	Producer	No Limit Records / Priority Records
2001	Silkk the Shocker	My World, My Way	Producer	No Limit Records / Priority Records
2001	Soulja Slim	The Streets Made Me	Producer	No Limit South
2001	Master P	Game Face	Producer	The New No Limit / Universal Records
2003	Choppa	Straight From the N.O.	Producer	The New No Limit / Universal Records
2004	UTP	The Beginning of the End	Producer	Rap-A-Lot Records
2004	Master P	Good Side, Bad Side	Producer	Koch Records
2005	C-Murder	The TRUest Sh!t I Ever Said	Producer	Koch Records
2006	Juvenile	Reality Check	Producer	Atlantic Records / UTP Records
2006	Mos Def	True Magic	Producer	Geffen Records
2006	Ras Kass	Revenge of the Spit	Producer	Re-Up Entertainment
2006	C-Murder	The Tru Story: Continued	Producer	Koch Records
2009	Ray J	For the Love Of	Producer	Knockout Entertainment
2010	Lok Akim	2112: The Journey	Producer	333 Music University / XL Productionz
2022	Daddy-O	First Team	Producer	SpitSLAM Record Label Group

=== Charting singles produced ===
Year	Single	Artist	US Billboard Hot Rap Singles	US Billboard Hot R&B/Hip-Hop Singles & Tracks	US Billboard Hot 100
2000	"Down for My N's"	C-Murder featuring Snoop Dogg and Magic	8	29	
2001	"He Did That"	Silkk the Shocker featuring Master P and Mac	3	50	
2004	"Nolia Clap"	UTP (Juvenile, Wacko and Skip)	9	9	31
