= Trapped in Crime =

Studio album by C-Murder
- Released: September 5, 2000
- Recorded: 1999–2000
- Genres: Southern hip-hop; gangsta rap; hardcore hip-hop
- Length: 65:16
- Labels: TRU; No Limit; Priority
- Producers: C-Murder (exec.); Jermaine Dupri, Donald XL Robertson, Carlos Stephens, Ke'Noe, L.T. Hutton, Bass Heavy, Suga Bear, DJ Ron, Ezell Swang, Bryan-Michael Cox

C-Murder chronology
Bossalinie (1999)	Trapped in Crime (2000)	C-P-3.com (2001)

Singles from Trapped In Crime
- 1. "Down for My N's" Released: September 27, 1999; 2. "Hustlin" Released: July 5, 2000; 3. "They Don't Really Know You" Released: September 4, 2000

Trapped in Crime is the third studio album by C-Murder released on September 5, 2000, on No Limit, TRU and Priority. The album was produced by Jermaine Dupri, Donald XL Robertson, Carlos Stephens, Ke'Noe and more. The album features guest appearances by Snoop Dogg, Jermaine Dupri, Da Brat, Fat Joe, Young Gunz, Silkk the Shocker and more. Trapped In Crime was another success for C-Murder, peaking at number nine on the Billboard 200 and becoming his third straight album to land in the top 10 on that chart while simultaneously topping the Top R&B/Hip-Hop Albums chart, selling 156,000 copies in its first week. It was later certified Platinum by the RIAA on April 7, 2001.

== Singles ==
In addition, the single "Down for My N's" is affiliated with Phi Beta Sigma and was quoted in many later rap songs, such as by Lil Wayne in 2 Chainz' song "Yuck!", by Tyga in Hit 'Em Up, by Future in DJ Khaled's "No New Friends", by Kanye West in Blood on the Leaves, and many more. It peaked at number 29 on the Hot R&B/Hip-Hop Singles & Tracks chart. "Hustlin" peaked at number 14 on the Canadian Hot 100.

== Critical reception ==
Professional ratings
Review scores
Source	Rating
AllMusic	4/5 stars
Entertainment Weekly	B
Los Angeles Times	3/4 stars
The Source	3.5/5 stars
Vibe	2.5/5 stars

AllMusic's Jason Birchmeier praised the "fairly solid beats" from No Limit's "more competent producers (XL, Ke-Noe, Carlos Stephens)" and C-Murder for delivering some "moderately effective choruses" on the tracks, but criticized the gangsta rap cliches throughout the album, concluding that: "Yes, this is pretty much standard No Limit fare, but it's one of the better late-'90s releases the label churned out and thus worthwhile for fans." Soren Baker of the Los Angeles Times commended C-Murder for using 2Pac's style to relay some "soul-searching and social commentary to his violent tales" and the producers for creating a "steady stream of potent soundscapes that complement C-Murder's gritty vision." Benjamin Meadows-Ingram of Vibe was critical of the poor "gangsta harmony hooks" throughout the overly "smooth production", but highlighted "That Calliope" for its "Halloween theme-esque break" and "rowdy, dirty-South block-party chant" that suggests the label has some staying power, concluding that "Trapped in Crime may reveal a wobbly No Limit camp, but don't expect to see them raise the white flag yet.

== Track listing ==
No.	Title	Producer(s)	Length
1.	"Intro" (featuring Krazy)	Carlos Stephens	0:57
2.	"Forever Tru"	Donald XL Robertson	2:49
3.	"Concrete Jungle" (featuring Kokane and Tha Eastsidaz)	L.T. Hutton	4:35
4.	"They Don't Really Know You" (featuring Master P and Erica Fox)	Carlos Stephens	3:39
5.	"How a Thug Like It" (featuring Da Brat and Jermaine Dupri)	Bryan-Michael Cox and Jermaine Dupri	3:13
6.	"Want Beef" (featuring Fat Joe)	Ke'Noe	2:27
7.	"Ride" (featuring Samm and D.I.G.)	Donald XL Robertson	4:37
8.	"Staring at the Walls"	Carlos Stephens	3:23
9.	"On da Block" (featuring Young Gunz)	Bass Heavy and Suga Bear	3:07
10.	"What You Bout" (featuring Mystikal)	Ke'Noe	2:45
11.	"Battlefield"		0:58
12.	"Where Do We Go" (featuring Mac, Silkk the Shocker and Nuance)	Ke'Noe	4:20
13.	"NL Niggaz" (featuring Afficial)	Ke'Noe	2:59
14.	"Too Much Noise" (featuring Master P and D.I.G.)	DJ Ron	3:22
15.	"Damned If They Murder Me" (featuring Mac, Magic and Ms. Peaches)	Donald XL Robertson	3:48
16.	"Hustlin'" (featuring Master P and Krazy)	Ezel Swang	3:41
17.	"That Calliope"	Donald XL Robertson	2:37
18.	"Young Thugs" (featuring Popeye, Jabo and Holloway of Ghetto Commission)	Donald XL Robertson	3:32
19.	"Otis Commercial" (featuring Otis)		0:36
20.	"Interlude"		0:47
21.	"They Want My Money" (featuring Mac and Mia X)	Donald XL Robertson	3:03
22.	"Thug in Yo Life" (featuring Krazy and Suga Bear)	Bass Heavy and Suga Bear	2:28
23.	"Down for My N's" (featuring Magic and Snoop Dogg)	KLC, Carlos Stephens and Donald XL Robertson	3:45
24.	"Street Thugs" (featuring Magic and New-9)	Donald XL Robertson	3:08

== Chart positions ==
=== Weekly charts ===
Chart (2000)	Peak position
US Billboard 200	9
US Top R&B/Hip-Hop Albums (Billboard)	1

=== Year-end charts ===
Chart (2000)	Position
US Top R&B/Hip-Hop Albums (Billboard)	93

=== Singles ===
"Down for My N's"

Chart	Position
Top R&B/Hip-Hop Singles & Tracks	29

Hustlin

Chart	Position
Canadian Singles Chart	14

== See also ==
- List of number-one R&B albums of 2000 (U.S.)
