= Screamin' 4 Vengeance =

Studio album by C-Murder
- Released: July 1, 2008
- Recorded: 2006–08
- Genre: Southern hip-hop; gangsta rap
- Label: TRU; Asylum
- Producer: 2Saint; Montez; II Deep Muzic; 2Much; C-Loc; Mo B. Dick; Savage; JSTO; Patience

C-Murder chronology
The Truest Shit I Ever Said (2005)	Screamin' 4 Vengeance (2008)	Calliope Click Volume 1 (2009)

Professional ratings
Review scores
Source	Rating
AllMusic	2.5/5 stars
PopMatters	4/10
RapReviews	6/10
The Source	3/5 stars
XXL	M (2/5)

Screamin' 4 Vengeance is the sixth solo studio album by American rapper C-Murder (who was serving a life sentence at the Louisiana State Penitentiary for murder). It was released on July 1, 2008 via TRU Records and Asylum Records. It features guest appearances from Verse, Max Minelli, Mia X, C-Loc, Detroit, G-Dinero, H Double, Jason Lyric, Krayzie Bone, Mr. Cheefa, Papoose, Sincere Sosa and Slim Thug. In the United States, the album peaked at number 130 on the Billboard 200, number 17 on the Top R&B/Hip-Hop Albums and number 9 on the Top Rap Albums charts.

== Track listing ==
No.	Title	Length
1.	"Intro"	1:52
2.	"I Represent"	4:05
3.	"WTRU (Skit)"	0:27
4.	"Be Fresh" (featuring Detroit)	4:27
5.	"Posted on tha Block" (featuring Krayzie Bone, Papoose, Mia X and Verse)	5:09
6.	"Mihita" (featuring Mia X)	4:34
7.	"Gangstafied Lyrics"	5:05
8.	"Streets Keep Callin'" (featuring H Double)	4:16
9.	"My Set"	5:32
10.	"Beastmode" (featuring Verse, J. Lyric, Sincere Sosa and Mr. Cheefa)	4:38
11.	"Cuttboyz Anthem" (featuring Verse, Max Minelli and G-Dinero)	4:56
12.	"Freeze (Ice Man)" (featuring Max Minelli)	3:35
13.	"Down South" (featuring Slim Thug and C-Loc)	4:42
14.	"Murdaman Dance"	4:43

== Charts ==
Chart (2008)	Peak position
US Billboard 200	130
US Top R&B/Hip-Hop Albums (Billboard)	17
US Top Rap Albums (Billboard)	9
