= Carlos Stephens =

American record producer and mixing engineer (born 1972)

- Also known as: Clos
- Born: Carlos Stephens; January 24, 1972 (age 54)
- Origin: New Orleans, Louisiana, U.S.
- Genre: Hip hop
- Occupations: Record producer, Mixing engineer
- Instruments: Vocals, Synthesizer, Keyboards, Drum machine, Sampler, Pro Tools, Turntablism, Scratching, guitar
- Years active: 1991–present
- Labels: Spiral Records (1991-1996) No Limit Records, Priority Records (1994-2002), Flame Entertainment (2003-present)

Carlos Stephens (born January 24, 1972) is an American record producer and mixing engineer from New Orleans, Louisiana, best known as a member of No Limit Records' in-house production team, Beats by the Pound. After leaving the label, he founded the record label Flame Entertainment. As of 2022, Stephens has over 75 million in credited record sales.

== Early years ==
Born In New Orleans, but raised in the Gretna area, Carlos started producing music for a few local groups in the early 1990s and this allowed Stephens to develop his skills and production methods.

== No Limit Records ==
In 1994, Stephens would produce for Ron Gray "The Bossman: which would be one of his final outside productions before joining the No Limit in-house production team of Beats by the Pound. Over the next few years he would provide substantial production for all No Limit artists, with his first major production on Silkk the Shocker's debut album The Shocker in 1996.

In 1996, Carlos, with the permission of Master P, became the only in-house producer to establish distribution outside No Limit Records. This allowed him to release his first artist, Skull Duggery and The Ghetto Commission in 1998. He would later receive nomination for Producer of the Year and collectively be voted as one of Hip-Hop's "Thirty Most Powerful People" by The Source.

In 1999, No Limit would see the departure of fellow Beats By The Pound production mates. As the only remaining member of the production group, Stephens would oversee the majority of the next five years of productions that resulted in multiple gold and platinum albums. Starting with Master P's platinum-selling album Only God Can Judge Me, and the title track for the film Light It Up. In 2000, Stephens would contribute production on the soundtrack to the HBO series Oz. Stephens and No Limit would follow up with the introduction of the 504 Boyz and his production of their self-titled platinum-selling debut album, with the lead single "Wobble Wobble" going Platinum, following this with the success of Master P's Gold album Ghetto Postage with its smash Platinum hit "Bout Dat". In 2001, Carlos would see his greatest commercial success with Lil Romeo's debut single "My Baby" reaching platinum status and also staying at number 1 on the Billboard charts for 10 weeks straight. The song "My Baby" was also the 2001 Billboard Single of the year.

== Later career ==
In 2002, Carlos began working with a partnership program for "Prodikeys", developed by Creative Labs. From 2004 to 2006, Carlos headed up the business development team with partner Gary Murray, founder of Wise Technologies. The new company was called Mixcast Networks (formally OOH! tv) Mixcast was a strategic, development and content accusation and distribution firm with a wi-fi component, that reached malls, airports, travel plazas.

By 2008, Carlos would take the director's chair with his debut video "Be Fresh" for C-Murder's album Screamin' 4 Vengeance. Stephens also started consulting, via 31Minds LLC. with the sole purpose of helping companies with branding, and creating strategic alliances between the companies in unconventional ways to expand the awareness of the product.
