= C-Murder =

American rapper (born 1971)

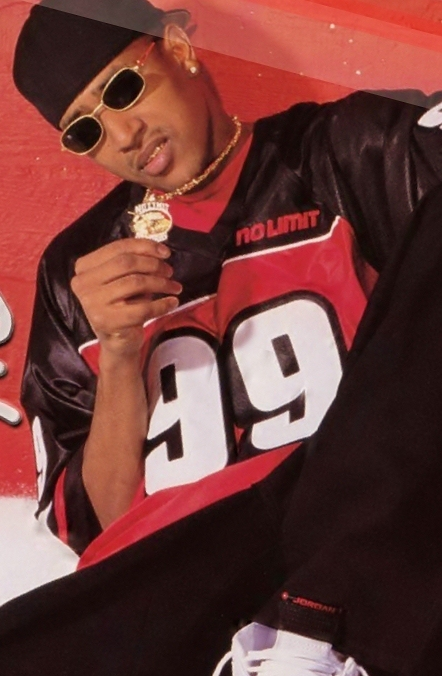

Background information
- Born: Corey Miller; March 9, 1971 (age 55); New Orleans, Louisiana, U.S.
- Genres: Southern hip-hop; gangsta rap
- Occupations: Rapper; singer; songwriter
- Years active: 1989–present
- Labels: Bossalinie; Rapbay; Urbanlife Distribution (current); Sony RED; No Limit Records; Priority Records; TRU Global; Venti Uno (former)

Corey Miller (born March 9, 1971), better known by his stage name C-Murder, is an American rapper from New Orleans, Louisiana. He initially gained fame in the mid to late-1990s as a part of his brother Master P's label No Limit Records, primarily as a member of the label's supergroup, TRU. Miller went on to release several solo albums of his own through the label, including 1998's platinum Life or Death. C-Murder has released nine albums altogether on six different labels, No Limit Records, TRU Records, Koch Records, Asylum Records, RBC Records, and Venti Uno.

In 2002, Miller was arrested in connection with the murder of 16-year-old Steve Thomas, and was sentenced to life in prison on August 14, 2009. Miller is serving his sentence at the Louisiana State Penitentiary. Controversy surrounding witnesses involved in Miller's trial came to light in 2018 when two key witnesses recanted their statements, stating they had been pressured into testifying against Miller by authorities. Miller maintains his innocence, and he, his brothers, and his nephew have all called for a new trial numerous times.

== Early life ==
Corey Miller was born in Uptown New Orleans, Louisiana on March 9, 1971. He grew up in the Calliope Projects in the 3rd Ward of New Orleans with his sister Germaine, and brothers Silkk the Shocker and Master P and Kevin Miller.

== Military service ==
After graduating from high school, Corey Miller enlisted in the United States Army. He served as a combat medic and was deployed to the Persian Gulf during the Gulf War.

== Music career ==
In 1998, Miller released his first album Life or Death which peaked at No. 3 on the Billboard 200 and was eventually certified platinum. He also was featured on the theme for the nWo Wolfpac.

In 1999, he released Bossalinie which peaked at No. 2 on the Billboard 200 and was certified gold.

In 2000, he released Trapped in Crime which peaked at No. 9 on the Billboard 200. The album included the single "Down for My N's"

In 2001, he released C-P-3.com, his last album with No Limit Records. It peaked at No. 45 on the Billboard 200 and included the singles "What U Gonna Do" and "Im Not Just".

In 2003, he was convicted of the murder of fan Steve Thomas. He recorded three hit albums while under house arrest awaiting re-trial: The Truest Shit I Ever Said (2005) which reached No. 41 on the Billboard 200, Screamin' 4 Vengeance (2008) which reached No. 130, and Calliope Click (2009) which peaked at No. 68 on the Billboard R&B Albums chart.

In 2009, he lost his appeal and pleaded no contest to two counts of attempted murder in an unrelated incident. While in prison he self-released a mixtape Ricochet (2013) and four albums, Tomorrow (2010), Ain't No Heaven in the Pen (2015), Give Me Freedom Or Give Me Death (2021), and the compilation Oldies but Goodies (2018).

In 2016, he released a diss track accusing rapper 2 Chainz of using the slogan and name style of his former group TRU and record label TRU Global Records.

== Other ventures ==
Miller acted in the No Limit films Da Game of Life, I Got the Hook-Up, and Hot Boyz. He is the author of the novel Death Around The Corner, published by Vibe.

== Legal issues ==
=== Steve Thomas case ===
In September 2003, Miller was convicted of second degree murder in connection with the January 12, 2002 beating and fatal shooting of a fan, 16-year-old Steve Thomas, at the Platinum Club, a now-closed nightclub in Harvey, Louisiana. Miller was arrested in the early hours of January 18 for causing a disturbance at the House of Blues in New Orleans, and shortly after charged in Thomas' murder. He was indicted on February 28, 2002. Judge Martha Sassone granted a new trial in April 2004 based on the claim that prosecutors improperly withheld criminal background information on three of their witnesses.

On March 20, 2006, Miller was released on a $500,000 bond and placed under house arrest. Sassone allowed Miller to promote his new, yet-to-be-titled CD and his novel, Death around the Corner, while under house arrest, but ruled that a gag order pertaining to the case would remain in effect. The terms of the house arrest required Sassone's permission for all visitors, including reporters.

On March 13, 2007, Sassone granted Miller's request to work on his music career on a per-request basis, but denied his request for a 7:00 a.m. to 9:00 p.m. curfew. Sassone's rulings in the case became an issue in her failed 2008 bid for re-election. Sassone was defeated by Judge Ellen Kovach; prosecutors subsequently renewed a request to have Miller returned to jail. During January 2009, Miller was confined to his residence on house arrest, and could only leave for a documented medical emergency.

On May 27, 2009, Miller pleaded no contest to two counts of attempted second degree murder. These charges stem from a 2001 incident in Baton Rouge in which Miller fired one shot, after which it jammed, from a semi-automatic pistol at the owner and bouncer of a night club who refused to allow Miller to enter the business with the gun. Miller was sentenced to ten years with credit for time served. A surveillance video of the incident was posted on YouTube.

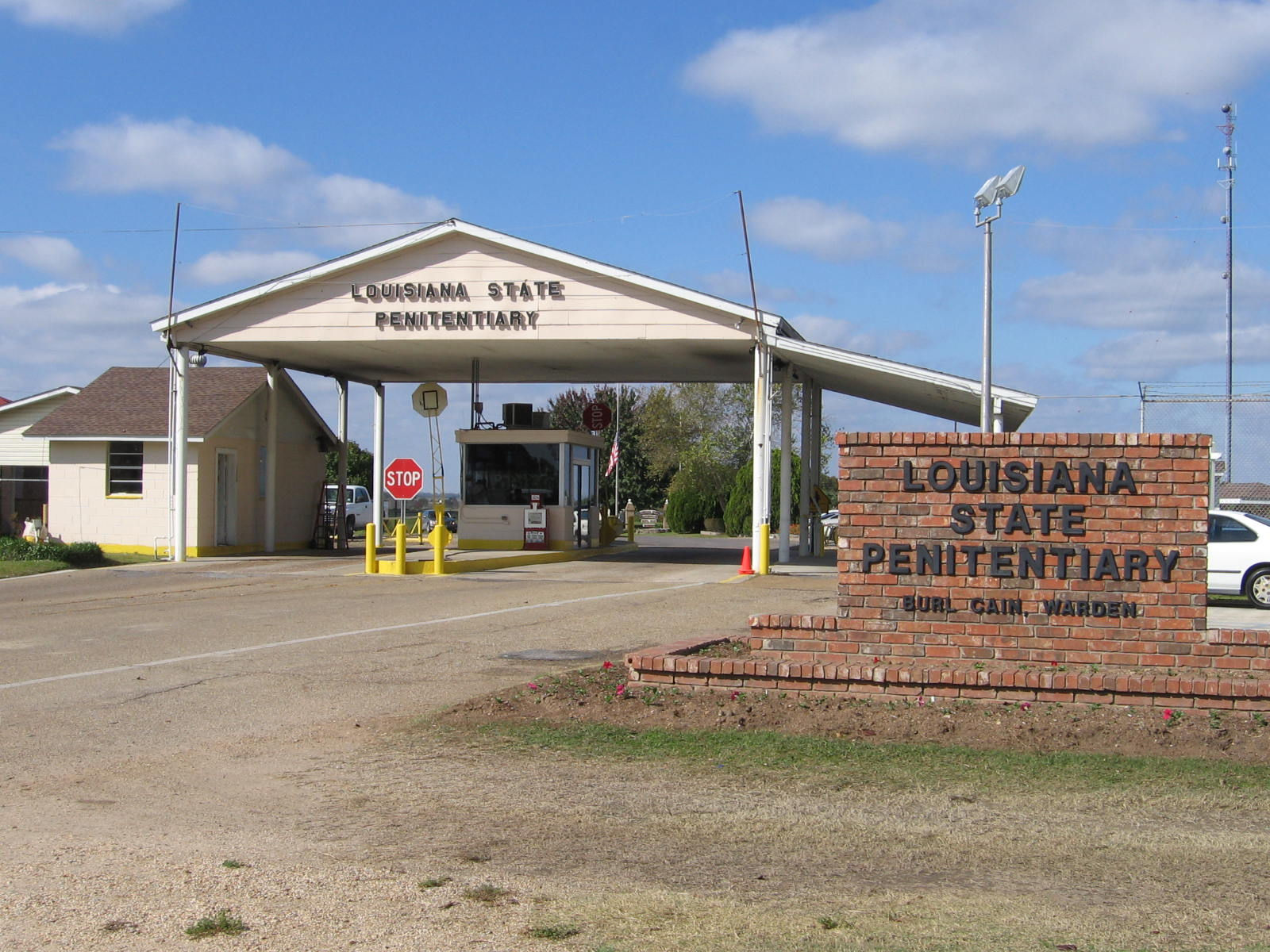
The Louisiana State Penitentiary in November 2009

On August 5, 2009, the murder trial began. The father of the victim spoke of his son being a fan of C-Murder before the incident. A bouncer also testified against Miller, saying he witnessed the shooting. He expressed fear of repercussions for his testimony. Prosecutors also charged C-Murder's associates with witness tampering.

On August 10, 2009, the jury reported being deadlocked, but Judge Hans Liljeberg instructed them to attempt to resolve the deadlock. Three hours later, the jury returned to announce it reached a 10–2 guilty verdict. The judge suspected that, given the deadlock announced earlier followed by the quick reversal, one of the jurors decided to switch under pressure to end the trial and instructed the jury to go back and deliberate on the case longer.

When they returned with the same 10–2 verdict, Miller was convicted of second-degree murder. During sentencing, the victim's father said, "I'm not rejoicing. I feel bad for [Miller's] family. But at least they can see him. What have we got but a gravesite and a photograph?" C-Murder was sentenced on August 14 by District Judge Hans Liljeberg to mandatory life imprisonment.

On August 27, 2009, Ernest Johnson, president of the Louisiana NAACP, requested an investigation into the jury deliberations. C-Murder's financial woes reportedly landed him the help of two Harvard attorneys, one of them Ronald Sullivan, who have agreed to assist with his appeal. One of the jurors, Mary Jacob, said that both she and a fellow juror, a 20-year-old student at Xavier University of Louisiana, were verbally abused by fellow jurors for their decision to acquit. According to Jacob, the abuse resulted in her switching her verdict, saying, "They literally made this 20-year-old girl so violently ill, she was shaking so bad. She ran into the bathroom. She was throwing her guts up. She couldn't function anymore. That's when I decided, the judge don't want to listen to me, doesn't want to listen to us? I told them, 'You want him to be guilty? He's guilty; now let's get the hell out of here.'" This account was partially confirmed by another juror. At the time, a 10–2 consensus was sufficient for conviction in Louisiana but a 9–3 consensus would result in a mistrial.

On December 28, 2011, his conviction was upheld.

On February 19, 2013, the Supreme Court rejected Miller v. Louisiana, which was Miller's final appeal of his conviction. After a jury voted 10–2 to convict Miller, Miller's attorneys argued that because federal juries must reach unanimous verdicts in criminal cases, Miller should have not been convicted in Louisiana.

On April 2, 2014, Miller's attorney, Rachel Conner, filed a post-conviction relief application in state court in Gretna. She raised 10 points to support her assertion that her client received no fair trial. Conner said she plans to raise additional points. Primary among the assertions is what she described as irregularities during the jury's deliberations, stating, "One juror cast a guilty vote not based on the evidence but because she wanted to end deliberations to protect another juror who refused to convict Miller but was targeted by other jurors to change her mind, Conner wrote."

In August 2021, Miller went on hunger strike to protest his conditions, which he feared would result in him getting COVID-19, and the status of his trial, saying he believed the district attorney had withheld evidence. That month, he hired civil rights attorney Benjamin Crump.

=== Investigation Discovery Reasonable Doubt ===
In June 2018, Miller's case was highlighted on an episode of Investigation Discovery Reasonable Doubt, in which Kenneth Jordan recanted and discussed his false testimony. Jordan stated he was pressured by detectives to testify against Miller or he himself would have faced a 10-year prison sentence for unrelated criminal charges. On July 6, another witness, Darnell Jordan, recanted his testimony, saying he was detained and locked in a hotel room by the police for refusing to testify against Miller.

== Discography ==
=== Solo albums ===
- Life or Death (1998)
- Bossalinie (1999)
- Trapped in Crime (2000)
- C-P-3.com (2001)
- Tru Dawgs (2002)
- The Truest Shit I Ever Said (2005)
- Screamin' 4 Vengeance (2008)
- Calliope Click Volume 1 (2009)
- Tomorrow (2010)
- Ain't No Heaven in the Pen (2015)
- Give Me Freedom or Give Me Death (2021)

=== Collaboration albums ===
- Penitentiary Chances (2016) with Boosie BadAzz
- Hood Stories (2026) with Boosie Badazz

== Filmography ==
Year	Title	Role	Notes
1997	I'm Bout It	Q	Support role
1998	MP da Last Don	Cuban Guard	Cameo role
1998	I Got the Hook-Up	T-Lay Boy #1	Cameo role
1998	Da Game of Life	Money	Support role
1999	Hot Boyz	Remo	Support role
1999	No Tomorrow	Himself	Cameo role
2002	Undisputed	Gat Boyz Rapper 3	Cameo role

== See also ==
- TRU
- No Limit Records
