= Magic discography =

This is the discography of the American rapper and recording artist Magic.

== Albums ==
=== Studio albums ===
List of studio albums, with selected chart positions,
Year	Album	Peak Chart Positions	
Year	Album	US	US R&B
1998	Sky's the Limit	15	3
1999	Thuggin'	53	9
2003	White Eyes	147	37
2003	On My Own	—	54
"—" denotes a recording that did not chart.

=== Collaborative albums ===
- Body Head Bangerz: Volume One (with Body Head Bangerz)
  - Released: August 3, 2004 (Original release)
    October 26, 2004 (Universal release)
  - Label: Body Head Entertainment, Universal
  - Chart positions: #12 (Top Heatseekers),#38 (Top R&B/Hip-Hop Albums)
  - U.S. sales: -
  - Last RIAA Certification: None
  - Singles: "Can't Be Touched", "I Smoke, I Drank"

== Singles ==
=== As lead artist ===
- 1998: "Did What I Had 2'" (feat. Mystikal)
- 1998: "9th Ward"
- 1999: "That's Me"
- 1999: "Ice On My Wrist" (feat. Master P)
- 2002: "What"
- 2003: "9th Ward'"
- 2003: "Tear It Up'"
- 2003: "War" (feat. Trouble)
- 2003: "Wylin'"
- 2003: "International Gangstas" (feat. Curren$y)
- 2005: "Let's Roll" (feat. 8ball & David Banner)
- 2005: "Me and My Dogs"
- 2006: "Shorty" (feat. Detroit)
- 2010: "Bitch You Must Be Crazy"
- 2010: "I'm Done"
- 2011: "Rollin" (feat. Campaign Brooks)
- 2012: "Like Beyonce" (feat. Level & Young Ready)

=== As featured singles ===
- 2004: "Can't Be Touched" (Body Head Bangerz featuring Trouble Tha Truth)
- 2004: "I Smoke, I Drank" (Body Head Bangerz featuring YoungBloodZ)
- 2004: "You Know My Kind" (Body Head Bangerz featuring B.G.)
- 2006: "Push Back" (New Orleans Finest)
- 2012: "See Wut Dat Do!" (SESS 4-5)

== Other songs ==
=== Solo ===
- ----: "Diss To Master P (Nigga U Owe Me FUCK NO LIMIT 1)"
- 1998: "Heaven 4 A Thug" (feat. Mac & C-Murder)
- 1999: "You Ain't a Baller"
- 2001: "Dirty Dee" (feat. Master P)
- 2001: "Incarcerated" (feat. Blaxuede & Fiend)
- 2003: "This For My"
- 2004: "Push Em Of" (feat. Chyna Whyte)
- 2008: "Da Lou Swag" (feat. Hurricane Chris & Big Poppa)
- 2010: "I Wish"
- 2010: "112" (feat. T-Pain)
- 2011: "In This Bitch"
- 2011: "My Thang"

=== Featured ===
- ????: "I Smoke, I Drank (Remix)" (Raw Boyz)
- ????: "7th Ward Soulja" (The Beat Doctor)
- ????: "Hate Me" (The Beat Doctor feat. Tricky & Greedi)
- 1998: "Buck 'Em" (Big Ed feat. Fiend)
- 1998: "Picture Me" (C-Murder)
- 1998: "Real Niggaz Gon Ride" (C-Murder)
- 1998: "Watch You Enemies" (C-Murder)
- 1998: "Dying in My City" (C-Murder feat. Snoop Dogg)
- 1998: "Do You Wanna Be A Rider" (Fiend feat. Prime Suspects)
- 1998: "So Much Drama" (Gambino Family feat. 2-4-1)
- 1998: "Don't Cry" (Gambino Family feat. Fiend, Gotti, QB & C-Murder)
- 1998: "Blood Line" (Ghetto Commission)
- 1998: "Our Thing" (Ghetto Commission feat. Mac)
- 1998: "Throw Them Thangs" (Kane & Abel)
- 1998: "Nobody Make A Sound" (Mac feat. 2-4-1 & Fiend)
- 1998: "Meet Me At The Hotel" (Mac feat. Mr. Serv-on, Storm & Mo B. Dick)
- 1998: "Let's Get 'Em" (Master P feat. C-Murder)
- 1998: "We Got It" (Mr. Serv-On feat. Big Ed & Fiend)
- 1998: "No Limit Soldiers II" (No Limit Soldiers)
- 1998: "N.L. Party" (Soulja Slim feat. Master P, Silkk The Shocker, Full Blooded, Tre-Nitty, Gambino Family, Big Ed, Prime Suspects, Mac, Kane & Abel & Snoop Dogg)
- 1998: "Plead My Case" (Steady Mobb'n)
- 1999: "Ride On Dem Bustas" (C-Murder feat. Mr. Serv-On)
- 1999: "I Remember" (C-Murder feat. Porsha)
- 1999: "Can't Hold Me Back" (C-Murder feat. Q.B.)
- 1999: "Closin' Down Shop" (C-Murder feat. Soulja Slim)
- 1999: "Been Thru It All" (Fiend)
- 1999: "We Riderz" (Lil Italy)
- 1999: "Soulja Style" (Lil Soldiers)
- 1999: "Bloody" (Mac)
- 1999: "War Party" (Mac feat. D.I.G.)
- 1999: "That's Hip Hop" (Mac feat. Sugar, Renior, Donald XL Robertson & Samm)
- 1999: "Ghetto Prayer" (Master P)
- 1999: "Ice On My Wrist (Remix)" (Master P)
- 1999: "Nobody Moves" (Master P)
- 1999: "Ain't Nothing Changed" (Master P feat. D.I.G.)
- 1999: "Foolish" (Master P feat. Mo B. Dick)
- 1999: "Bonnie & Clyde" (Mercedes)
- 1999: "Part 3" (Mo B. Dick feat. C-Murder & Mia X)
- 1999: "Murder" (Mr. Serv-On)
- 1999: "Straight Outta N.O." (Mr. Serv-On feat. C-Murder)
- 1999: "Hail Mary" (TRU)
- 1999: "Soldier Till I Die" (TRU feat. D.I.G.)
- 2000: "No Limit" (504 Boyz)
- 2000: "Whodi" (504 Boyz)
- 2000: "Wobble Wobble" (504 Boyz)
- 2000: "Damned If They Murder Me" (C-Murder feat. Mac & MS. Peaches)
- 2000: "I Won't Stop" (C-Murder)
- 2000: "Street Thugs" (C-Murder feat. New-9)
- 2000: "Down 4 My Niggas" (C-Murder feat. Snoop Dogg)
- 2000: "Pockets Gone' Stay Fat" (Master P)
- 2000: "Back Up Off Me" (Snoop Dogg feat. Master P)
- 2002: "Holla" (504 Boyz)
- 2002: "I Gotta Whare That There" (504 Boyz)
- 2002: "Tight Whist" (504 Boyz)
- 2003: "Say It 2 My Face" (Boo)
- 2003: "Oh No" (Choppa, Krazy, Magic & T-Bo)
- 2003: "Dirty South" (Soulja Slim)
- 2004: "It's Whatever (Remix)" (Beelow feat. Juvenile, Plaboy & Lil Josh)
- 2004: "Can't Be Touched (Remix)" (Body Head Bangerz feat. Trouble Tha Truth, Remy Ma & Tiatsh)
- 2004: "My Lady" (Detroit)
- 2004: "No Rush" (Detroit)
- 2004: "Down Here (Remix)" (Sean Paul feat. Lil' Boosie & Soulja Slim)
- 2005: "Slugged Up" (Choppa)
- 2005: "Blocka Blocka" (Chyna Whyte)
- 2005: "Ain't Got Nothing" (David Banner feat. Lil' Boosie)
- 2005: "Ain't Got Nothin' (Trunk In Da Club Remix)" (David Banner feat. Lil' Boosie & DJ CASPER)
- 2005: "We Bring Pain" (S.T.E.E.L.)
- 2006: "Fuck Dat Nigga" (Chill feat. Clay 2 Da Jay)
- 2008: "I Smoke, I Drink (Remix) (Dissing Chamillionaire)" (Mike Jones)
- 2008: "He's Coming" (V.A.N.T. feat. John Jack)
- 2009: "From The Bottom" (C-Murder feat. Detroit & Skip)
- 2010: "Head Up" (C-Murder)
- 2011: "Hit Louisiana" (Young Chetta feat. Brooks)
- 2011: "Love My City" (Merk)
- 2011: "Blow My High" (Raw Boyz)
- 2012: "Beauty" (Detroit)
- 2012: "Niggas Ain't Shit" (Level feat. Spitta)

== Video ==
=== Music video ===
- 1998: "No Hope" (Magic feat. C-Murder, Lady TRU & Sons of Funk)
- 1999: "Talk It Like I Bring It bw Mr. Whomp Whomp" (Fiend)
- 1999: "War Party" (Mac feat. Magic & D.I.G.)
- 1999: "That's Me" (Magic)
- 1999: "Ice On My Wrist" (Magic feat. Master P)
- 1999: "Foolish" (Master P feat. Magic & Mo B. Dick)
- 2000: "Whodi" (504 Boyz)
- 2000: "Wobble Wobble" (504 Boyz)
- 2000: "Down 4 My Niggas" (C-Murder feat. Snoop Dogg & Magic)
- 2000: "Pockets Gone' Stay Fat" (Master P feat. Magic)
- 2002: "What" (Magic)
- 2003: "Tight Whips" (504 Boyz)
- 2004: "Can't Be Touched" (Body Head Bangerz featuring Trouble Tha Truth)
- 2004: "I Smoke, I Drank" (Body Head Bangerz featuring YoungBloodZ)
- 2005: "Black Saturday" (Jazz, Ramp & Boosie Red)
- 2005: "Ain't Got Nothing" (David Banner feat. Magic & Lil' Boosie)
- 2011: "Love My City" (Merk feat. Magic)
- 2011: "Hit Louisiana" (Young Chetta feat. Magic & Brooks)
- 2012: "Gold Mouth Dawg (Remix)" (Foxx feat. Magic)
- 2012: "Like Beeyonce" (Magic feat. Level & Young Ready)
- 2013: "Blow My High" (The Beat Doctor feat. Ay Bay Bay, Juvenile, Magic & Greedi)

== Filmography ==
- 2003: (Hollywood Homicide)
- 2005: (Black Saturday (film))
- 2007: (Rim Shop)
- 2008: (Death Toll)
- 2008: (Block Party Madness)
- 2010: (Sinners and Saints (2010 film))
