= Crunk Hits, Vol. 2 =

Crunk Hits Vol. 2

Compilation album by various artists
- Released: August 22, 2006
- Genre: Crunk
- Length: 1:18:12
- Label: TVT

Crunk Hits compilation series chronology
| Crunk Hits (2005) | Crunk Hits Vol. 2 (2006) | Crunk Hits Vol. 3 (2007) |

Professional ratings
Review scores
| Source | Rating |
|---|---|
| AllMusic | 3.5/5 stars |
| MSN Music | A |
| RapReviews | 6.5/10 |

Crunk Hits, Vol. 2 is the second installment in TVT Records' Crunk Hits compilation series, released on August 22, 2006. Executively produced by Steve Gottlieb, the album features 18 popular hip-hop singles mainly from the label artists, in-house record producers or its affiliates at that time. The opening track "Snap Yo Fingers" was intended to be released as the lead single from Lil' Jon's debut solo album Crunk Rock, but was left out of the album.

In the United States, the album debuted at number 48 on the Billboard 200, number 26 on the Top R&B/Hip-Hop Albums, number 10 on the Top Rap Albums, atop the Independent Albums, and number 2 on the Compilation Albums charts.

The European version has a slightly different tracklist with exclusive video content.

A sequel to the 2005's Crunk Hits, the album serves as a precursor to subsequent Crunk Hits Vol. 3 and Crunk Hits Vol. 4, both released in 2007.

== Track listing ==
US version
| No. | Title | Writer(s) | Performer(s) | Length |
|---|---|---|---|---|
| 1. | "Snap Yo Fingers" | Jonathan Smith; Alphonzo Bailey; Sean Paul Joseph | Lil' Jon, E-40 and Sean Paul | 4:33 |
| 2. | "Turn It Up" | Hakeem Seriki; Scott Storch; Wesley Weston | Chamillionaire and Lil' Flip | 4:35 |
| 3. | "Bojangles" (Remix) | J. Smith; Armando Pérez | Pitbull | 3:44 |
| 4. | "Shake" | Michael Crooms; D'eongelo Holmes; Eric Jackson; Pjarro Scott; Pérez; George Kranz | Ying-Yang Twins and Pitbull | 4:01 |
| 5. | "Fireman" | Dwayne Carter; Bigram Zayas; Matthew DelGiorno | Lil' Wayne | 4:24 |
| 6. | "No Problem" | J. Smith; Darryl Richardson III | Lil' Scrappy | 3:34 |
| 7. | "Go to Church" | O'Shea Jackson; Calvin Broadus; J. Smith | Ice Cube, Snoop Dogg and Lil' Jon | 4:00 |
| 8. | "Move Around" | Christopher Dorsey; Byron Thomas | B.G. and Mannie Fresh | 4:47 |
| 9. | "Back Then" | Michael Jones | Mike Jones | 4:05 |
| 10. | "Ms. New Booty" | Warren Mathis; Crooms; E. Jackson; Holmes | Bubba Sparxxx, Ying-Yang Twins and Mr. Collipark | 4:40 |
| 11. | "Gangsta Party" | Marvin Gaye; Mario Mims; Carlos Broady; Bernard Freeman; Premro Smith | Yo Gotti, Bun B and 8Ball | 4:56 |
| 12. | "Tell Me When to Go" | Earl Stevens; Charles Williams; J. Smith; Russell Simmons; Darryl McDaniels; Joseph Simmons | E-40 and Keak da Sneak | 3:58 |
| 13. | "Stay Fly" | Jordan Houston; Darnell Carlton; Paul Beauregard; P. Smith; Marlon Goodwin; David Brown; Willie Hutchinson | Three 6 Mafia | 3:57 |
| 14. | "Gasolina" (DJ Buddha Remix) | Ramón Ayala; J. Smith; Pérez; Victor Santiago | Daddy Yankee, Lil' Jon, Pitbull and Noreaga | 4:43 |
| 15. | "I Smoke, I Drank" (Remix) | Awood Johnson; Joseph; Jeffrey Grigsby; Roy Jones Jr. | Body Head Bangerz and Magic | 5:02 |
| 16. | "Sittin' Sidewayz" | Paul Slayton; Salih Williams; Milton Powell | Paul Wall and Big Pokey | 3:49 |
| 17. | "Icy" | Radric Davis; Jay Jenkins; Xavier Dotson | Gucci Mane | 4:44 |
| 18. | "White Tee" | Jamall Willingham; Gerald Tiller; Maurice Gleaton | Dem Franchize Boyz | 4:40 |
| Total length: | | | | 1:18:12 |

Sample credits

- Track 4 includes a sample of "Din Daa Daa" written, performed and produced by George Kranz.
- Track 5 contains interpolations from the composition "Tender Love" written by James Harris.
- Track 11 contains a sample of "Far Cry" written, performed and produced by Marvin Gaye.

== Personnel ==
- Steve Gottlieb — executive producer
- Christian Cortes — art direction, illustration
- Daniel Hastings — art direction
- Jason Mazur — A&R coordinator
- James Eichelberger — A&R

== Charts ==
| Chart (2006) | Peak position |
|---|---|
| US Billboard 200 | 48 |
| US Top R&B/Hip-Hop Albums (Billboard) | 26 |
| US Top Rap Albums (Billboard) | 10 |
| US Independent Albums (Billboard) | 1 |
| US Compilation Albums (Billboard) | 2 |
