= Wobble Wobble =

2000 single by 504 Boyz

Single by 504 Boyz

from the album Goodfellas
- Released: March 28, 2000
- Recorded: 1999
- Genre: Hip hop
- Length: 3:34
- Label: No Limit; Priority
- Songwriters: Percy Miller, Corey Miller, Vyshonn Miller, McKinley Phipps, Awood Johnson, Michael Tyler, Michael Wilson
- Producer: Carlos Stephens

"Wobble Wobble" is the debut single by American hip-hop group 504 Boyz, It was released in March 2000 from their debut studio album, Goodfellas. The song was produced by Beats by the Pound member Carlos Stephens and featured seven members of the group, Master P, C-Murder, Silkk the Shocker, Mac, Magic, Krazy and Mystikal. The production incorporates elements of the New Orleans hip-hop subgenre of bounce music. The Goodfellas version is a remix, since the original appeared on Magic's album Thuggin' first. The original version, also produced by Carlos Stephens, features a slightly different beat and only features Magic, C-Murder, and Mac.

The song became one of No Limit's biggest hits, peaking at number 17 on the Billboard Hot 100 and topping the Hot Rap Singles chart. It was the third biggest rap single of 2000, held from the top spot on the Billboard Year-End Hot Rap Singles of 2000 by Missy Elliott's "Hot Boyz" and Solé's "4, 5, 6".

== Single track listing ==
1. "Wobble Wobble" (Album version)
2. "Wobble Wobble" (Radio version)
3. "Don't Play No Games" (performed by Krazy)
4. "Wobble Wobble" (Instrumental)

== Charts ==
=== Peak positions ===
| Chart (2000) | Peak position |
|---|---|
| U.S. Billboard Hot 100 | 17 |
| U.S. Billboard Hot R&B/Hip-Hop Singles & Tracks | 2 |
| U.S. Billboard Hot Rap Singles | 1 |
| U.S. Billboard Rhythmic Top 40 | 17 |

=== Year-end charts ===
| End of year chart (2000) | Position |
|---|---|
| Billboard Hot R&B/Hip-Hop Singles & Tracks | 37 |
| Billboard Hot Rap Singles | 3 |
