= Brick Livin' =

Studio album by Mr. Marcelo
- Released: July 25, 2000
- Recorded: 2000
- Genre: Southern hip hop, gangsta rap
- Label: No Limit/Priority
- Producer: Carlos Stephens (exec.); Donald XL Robertson (exec.), Suga Bear, Ke'Noe

Mr. Marcelo chronology
Brick Livin' (2000)	Streetz Got Luv 4 Me (2001)

Professional ratings
Review scores
Source	Rating
AllMusic	4/5 stars
The Source	3.5/5 stars

Brick Livin' is the debut album by the rapper Mr. Marcelo. It was released on July 25, 2000, through No Limit Records. It was produced by Carlos Stephens, Donald XL Robertson, Suga Bear and Ke'Noe. Though it was met with positive reviews, Brick Livin' failed to advance high on the charts, making it to only No. 172 on the Billboard 200. It also peaked at No. 43 on the Top R&B/Hip-Hop Albums and No. 9 on the Top Heatseekers. It is Mr. Marcelo's only album on No Limit Records.

== Critical reception ==
Jason Birchmeier of AllMusic wrote that "what listeners will find is a refreshing approach to increasingly generic motifs that could be the most enthusiastic record to bear the No Limit stamp since Master P's breakthrough album, Ghetto D". In a review for The Source, Remy Trahant praised the album for its "bass-heavy beats coupled with machine-gun blasts of closed hi-hat 16th notes", but criticized the lack of diversity in its lyrical content.

== Track listing ==
No.	Title	Producer(s)	Length
1.	"How U Like It" (featuring Master P)	Donald XL Robertson	2:10
2.	"Somethin'" (featuring Krazy)	Ezell Swang	4:10
3.	"Hold Up" (featuring Erica Foxx)	Carlos Stephens	3:46
4.	"Ha Brah" (featuring DoeDoe & Wayngo)	Big Roe	3:15
5.	"Live By It" (featuring Mac)	Carlos Stephens	3:35
6.	"GTO" (featuring C-Murder)	Donald XL Robertson	2:47
7.	"Wildin'" (featuring Master P)	Carlos Stephens	2:33
8.	"Let's Do It" (featuring Ghetto Commission)	Carlos Stephens	3:14
9.	"Live It Up" (featuring Ke'Noe)	Ke'Noe	2:50
10.	"Hot Shit"	Ezell Swang	3:27
11.	"Sound da Alarm" (featuring DoeDoe & Jacko)	Big Roe	4:16
12.	"Brick Livin'"	Carlos Stephens	4:08
13.	"Y'all N's"		3:29
14.	"Soldiers For Life" (featuring Samm & D.I.G.)	Donald XL Robertson	3:02
15.	"U Never Know"	Ke'Noe	4:35
16.	"Southern Funk"	Big Roe	4:07
17.	"Me & My Girl" (featuring Marijuana)		3:45
18.	"187" (featuring Badd Boyz)	Big Roe	3:47
