= Ballers (album) =

Studio album by 504 Boyz
- Released: December 10, 2002
- Recorded: 2002
- Genre: Pop rap
- Length: 70:42
- Labels: The New No Limit, Universal Records
- Producers: Donald XL Robertson, Sinista, Todd Moultrie

504 Boyz chronology
Goodfellas (2000)	Ballers (2002)	Hurricane Katrina: We Gon Bounce Back (2005)

Singles from Ballers
- 1. "Tight Whips" Released: November 2002; 2. "Get Back" Released: 2002

Professional ratings
Review scores
Source	Rating
AllMusic	0/5 stars
The A.V. Club	(favorable)
The Rolling Stone Album Guide	3.0/5 stars

Ballers is the second studio album by American hip hop group, 504 Boyz. It was released on December 10, 2002, through Universal Records and Master P's The New No Limit. It was produced by Donald XL Robertson with additional production by newcomer Todd Moultrie on the reggae influenced My Life is Sweet. The album peaked at number 49 on the Billboard 200 and number 13 on the Top R&B/Hip-Hop Albums chart.

The members that perform on this album include Master P, Curren$y, Choppa, Magic, Silkk The Shocker, Krazy and T-Bo.

== Track listing ==
No.	Title	Length
1.	"Intro"	0:13
2.	"Tight Whips" (Master P, Choppa, Magic, Krazy, Slay Sean, Silkk The Shocker, Lil' Romeo, 5th Ward Weebie, & T-Bo)	4:28
3.	"Who Run This" (featuring 5th Ward Weebie, CNote & Papa Reu)	4:22
4.	"Holla" (Master P, Krazy, T-Bo, Curren$y)	4:38
5.	"Haters Gon' Hate"	3:40
6.	"I Got You Girl" (featuring Tyron)	3:40
7.	"Look At Me Now" (Krazy, Afficial)	3:06
8.	"Yeah Yeah" (featuring Slay Sean & Young Blayze)	3:22
9.	"Get Back"	3:27
10.	"Commercial"	1:03
11.	"My Life Is Sweet" (Curren$y, Afficial, Krazy, Master P)	4:38
12.	"Wanna Live Like Us" (featuring Afficial)	4:39
13.	"Tell Me"	3:48
14.	"War" (Curren$y & Afficial)	4:43
15.	"I Gotta Have That There"	3:47
16.	"Everywhere I Go"	2:48
17.	"Everybody Chillin'" (featuring Kango Slim)	3:16
18.	"We Gon' Ride"	3:08
19.	"Grab Da Wall & Rock Da Boat" (Choppa, Krazy, Curren$y, Master P, 5th Ward Weebie, P-Town Moe)	7:55

== Charts ==
=== Weekly charts ===
Chart (2002)	Peak position
US Billboard 200	49
US Top R&B/Hip-Hop Albums (Billboard)	13

=== Year-end charts ===
Chart (2003)	Position
US Top R&B/Hip-Hop Albums (Billboard)	80
