= Jonuz =

Jonuz is a given name and a surname. Notable people with the name include:

== Given name ==
- Jonuz Kaceli (1908–1951), Albanian businessman and dissident
- Jonuz Zejnullahu (1975–1999), Albanian Imam and soldier of the Kosovo Liberation Army (KLA)

== Surname ==
- Elizabeta Jonuz (born 1964), German cultural studies (sociology) educator, social pedagogue, author and civil rights activist
- Mirsad Jonuz (born 1962), Macedonian footballer and coach

== See also ==
- Jonas (name)
