= Elizabeta Jonuz =

German writer

Elizabeta Jonuz (born 1964 in Skopje) is a cultural studies (sociology) educator, social pedagogue, author and civil rights activist who campaigns for the rights of members of the Roma minority. She is a professor at Hanover University of Applied Sciences and Arts and teaches social work with a focus on migration and international issues.

== Life and work ==
Elizabeta Jonuz is a German Romni and lecturer at the Institute for Comparative Education and Social Sciences of the Faculty of Human Sciences at the University of Cologne. She also teaches as a professor of social work at the Hanover University of Applied Sciences and Arts in the Department of Migration and International Affairs.

Elizabeta Jonuz was born in 1964 in Skopje in Yugoslavia. Her parents - her father is Sefedin Jonuz - came to Germany with her and her older sister in 1967 as Yugoslavian Elizabeta Jonuz grew up in Solingen. She has lived in Cologne since 1982. There she first learned the profession of educator. She then worked as an after-school care worker (until 1994) and in a daycare center (until 2001), which she managed from 1999. At the age of 37, she began studying social pedagogy at Cologne University of Applied Sciences (2001–2004) and at the same time trained as a psychoanalytic systemic counselor. counselor. From 2004 to 2008, she completed her doctorate in social sciences at the University of Cologne. Since 2009, Elizabeta Jonuz has been a research assistant at the Cologne University of Applied Sciences and a lecturer at the Institute for Comparative Education and Social Sciences at the Faculty of Human Sciences at the University of Cologne. She focuses on migration sociology, educational sociology, urban sociology, ethnicization, educational work critical of racism, etc.

Elizabeta Jonuz has been involved in educational and mediation work on the situation of Roma in Germany and Roma in the former Yugoslavia since the early 1990s. She has given lectures and published in magazines. As part of the Cologne Rom e. V., she traveled to Macedonia with Karola Fings to document the situation of Roma and Romnija [also: Romnja] deported from Germany. The two authors gave lectures and published on the subject throughout the country. Elizabeta Jonuz, Karola Fings and Günter Glocksin criticized the re-integration programme of the North Rhine-Westphalian state government as a precursor model for mass deportations of Roma.

Elizabeta Jonuz published several articles in the magazine Jekh Čhib [also: Jek Čip = "one language/tongue"], published by Rom e. V. Materials on the situation of the Roma and the FRG, which was intended, among other things, to educate majority society about antiziganist stereotypes. Jekh Čhip appeared in the 1990s (1993–1996) with the self-image of "questioning perceptions, examining supposed knowledge", after there was a social interest in critically examining this 'knowledge', ... sporadically at best".

Subsequently, Elizabeta Jonuz also dealt academically with migrant Roma who came to Germany from the former Yugoslavia as "guest workers" in the 1960s and 1970s, for example, and processes of their marginalization against the background of the term ethnicization.

With regard to feminism, Elizabeta Jonuz dealt with the role of the Romni and their relationship to postmodern and postcolonial feminist theories. She dealt with the concept of multiple identities, e.g. with Birgit Rommelspacher, according to which a person is never only either black or white, poor or rich, woman or man, Turkish or German. Depending on the context in which a person is currently moving, they are more one or the other, the self is an open system, different elements of identity are simultaneously effective, shifting against each other. Elizabeta Jonuz counters this with the effectiveness of the specific discrimination form of antiziganism: "In Western industrial societies in Europe, the Romni is always first and foremost Roma."

For the first major Romnija congress in Germany, which was attended by the artist and writer Ceija Stojka, the musician Esma Redžepova and the filmmaker Melanie Spitta, among others, Jonuz created an exhibition on the subject of "Roma women: Clichés and Realities."
