= World War III (Mac album) =

Studio album by Mac
- Released: September 28, 1999
- Recorded: 1998–1999
- Genre: Hip-hop
- Length: 1:10:59
- Labels: No Limit; Priority
- Producers: Bass Heavy; Big Gene; Carlos Stephens; D.J. Wop; Ke'Noe; Mac; Raj Smoove; Renior; Suga Bear; XL

Mac chronology
| Shell Shocked (1998) | World War III (1999) | Son of the City (2022) |

Professional ratings
Review scores
| Source | Rating |
|---|---|
| AllMusic | 3/5 stars |

World War III is the third solo studio album by American rapper Mac. It was released on September 28, 1999, via No Limit/Priority Records. Production was handled by XL, Carlos Stephens, Renior, Raj Smoove, Suga Bear, Bass Heavy, Big Gene, DJ Wop, Ke'Noe, and Mac himself. It features guest appearances from C-Murder, Magic, Master P, Mia X, Ms. Peaches, Samm, Storm, Calliope Popeye,, D.I.G., Renior, Sons of Funk, Suga Bear and XL.

In the United States, the album debuted at number 44 on the Billboard 200 and number 6 on the Top R&B/Hip-Hop Albums charts. Along with a promotional single, an accompanying music video was released for the song "War Party" premiered on Rap City. In 2001, Mac was convicted of manslaughter and sentenced to thirty years in prison. He was released from prison in 2021 after serving twenty years.

== Track listing ==
| No. | Title | Producer(s) | Length |
|---|---|---|---|
| 1. | "Intro" | Big Gene | 1:02 |
| 2. | "War Party" (featuring Magic and D.I.G.) | XL | 3:28 |
| 3. | "Best Friends" | Renior; Suga Bear | 3:15 |
| 4. | "Like Before" (featuring Storm) | XL | 4:33 |
| 5. | "We Deadly" (featuring Master P) | Ke'Noe | 4:08 |
| 6. | "Bloody" (featuring Magic) | XL | 4:31 |
| 7. | "You Never Know" (featuring Mia X) | Carlos Stephens | 3:17 |
| 8. | "Just Another Thug" (featuring C-Murder) | Carlos Stephens; Bass Heavy (ass.); Big Gene (ass.); Bigg Cheeez (ass.); XL (ass.) | 2:48 |
| 9. | "Battle Cry (Tomorrow)" | DJ Wop; Bigg Cheeez (add.) | 4:17 |
| 10. | "If It's Cool" (featuring Ms. Peaches) | Raj Smoove; Bigg Cheeez (add.) | 4:11 |
| 11. | "Cops and Robbers" | Renior | 4:24 |
| 12. | "Lock Down" (Remix) | Suga Bear | 4:05 |
| 13. | "Paradise" (featuring Popeye and Samm) | Renior | 4:32 |
| 14. | "That's Hip Hop" (featuring Suga Bear, Renior, XL, Samm and Magic) | Mac | 2:59 |
| 15. | "Can U Love Me? (Eyes of a Killer)" | Mac; DJ Wop (add.); Big Gene (add.); XL (add.) | 3:47 |
| 16. | "Genocide" (Skit) | | 0:45 |
| 17. | "Genocide" (featuring Ms. Peaches) | Bass Heavy | 3:05 |
| 18. | "Father's Day" | XL | 3:52 |
| 19. | "Still Callin' Me" (featuring Ms. Peaches and Sons of Funk) | Carlos Stephens | 3:49 |
| 20. | "Assassin Nation" (featuring Storm) | Raj Smoove; Bigg Cheeez (add.) | 3:22 |
| 21. | "Outro" | | 0:49 |
| Total length: | | | 1:10:59 |

== Personnel ==
- McKinley "Mac" Phipps Jr. – vocals, producer (tracks: 14, 15)
- Awood "Magic" Johnson Jr. – vocals (tracks: 2, 6, 14)
- Donnie "D.I.G." Duplesis – vocals (track 2)
- Janelle "Storm" Perrilliat – vocals (tracks: 4, 20)
- Percy "Master P" Miller – vocals (track 5), additional vocals (track 17), executive producer
- Mia "Mia X" Young – vocals (track 7)
- Corey "C-Murder" Miller – vocals (track 8)
- Aldreamer "Peaches" Smith – vocals (tracks: 10, 17, 19), additional vocals (track 15)
- Samuel "Samm" Johnson – vocals (tracks: 13, 14)
- Calliope Popeye – vocals (track 13)
- Sugar – vocals (track 14), producer (tracks: 3, 12)
- Pierre Renoir – vocals (track 14), producer (tracks: 3, 11, 13)
- Donald "XL" Robertson – vocals (track 14), additional vocals (track 12), producer (tracks: 2, 4, 6, 18), associate producer (track 8), additional producer (track 15)
- Sons of Funk – vocals (track 19), additional vocals (tracks: 12, 15)
- Eugene "Big Gene" Stephens – producer (track 1), associate producer (track 8), additional producer (track 15)
- Maurice "Ke'Noe" Jordan – producer (track 5)
- Carlos Stephens – producer (tracks: 7, 8, 19)
- Earl Anthony "DJ Wop" Register Jr. – producer (track 9), additional producer (track 15)
- Roger Donald "Raj Smoove" Dickerson II – producer (tracks: 10, 20)
- Roderick "Bass Heavy" Tillman – producer (track 17), associate producer (track 8)
- Richard "Bigg Cheeez" Bernard – associate producer (track 8), additional producer (tracks: 9, 10, 20)
- Phipps – additional vocals (track 1)
- Vyshonn "Silkk the Shocker" Miller – additional vocals (track 5)
- Andrew "Skull Duggery" Jordan – additional vocals (track 5)
- Jamo – additional vocals (tracks: 8, 9, 15)
- Kiné – additional vocals (track 15)
- Gabe Chiesa – mixing (tracks: 1, 2, 4, 6, 9, 10, 14, 15, 17, 18, 20)
- Alex Sok – mixing (tracks: 3, 5, 7, 8, 11–13, 19)
- Rob Worthington – engineering assistant (tracks: 1, 2, 4, 6, 9, 10, 14, 15, 17, 18, 20)
- Michael Pandos – engineering assistant (tracks: 3, 5, 7, 8, 11–13, 19)
- Leslie Henderson – cover photo
- Pen & Pixel Graphics, Inc. – artwork
- Jodi Cohen – design, layout
- Duffy Rich – A&R
- Lupe Ceballos – project coordinator

== Charts ==
Chart performance for World War III
| Chart (1999) | Peak position |
|---|---|
| US Billboard 200 | 44 |
| US Top R&B/Hip-Hop Albums (Billboard) | 6 |
