= Streetz Got Luv 4 Me =

Studio album by Mr. Marcelo
- Released: July 31, 2001
- Genre: Southern hip hop, gangsta rap
- Label: Tuff Guys Entertainment

Mr. Marcelo chronology
Brick Livin' (2000)	Streetz Got Luv 4 Me (2001)	Still Brick Livin' (2004)

Streetz Got Luv 4 Me' is the second album by rapper Mr. Marcelo. It was released July 31, 2001 through Tuff Guys Entertainment.

== Track listing ==
1. "Intro"
2. "Can't Harm Me"
3. "I'll Do U Somethin'" (featuring Mystikal & Curren$y)
4. "Magnolia Breakin' Em Off" (featuring Soulja Slim)
5. "One & One" (featuring Curren$y & Lil' Doc)
6. "3rd Ward G's" (featuring Baby & Doe Doe)
7. "When I Spit"
8. "GTO" (featuring Lil' Doc & Curren$y)
9. "Livin' It Up" (featuring C-Murder & Ke'Noe)
10. "Whatcha' Want Brick?"
11. "Redrum" (featuring Popeye)
12. "Soldier Story"
13. "Strictly Street"
14. "Who Want It?" (featuring Curren$y)
15. "Whatever"
16. "Respect It" (featuring Ton-Toe & Lil' Doc)
17. "Desperados" (featuring B-Black, Curren$y & Krazy)
18. "Wicked Flow" (featuring Chyna Whyte & Badd Boyz)
19. "The Ghetto" (featuring Lil' Doc)
20. "Outro" (featuring Curren$y)
