= List of Billboard number-one R&B albums of 2003 =

These are the albums that reached number one on the Billboard Top R&B/Hip-Hop Albums chart in 2003.

== Chart history ==
Issue date	Album	Artist	Ref
January 4	God's Son	Nas	
January 11	I Care 4 U	Aaliyah	
January 18	I Care 4 U	Aaliyah	
January 25	I Care 4 U	Aaliyah	
February 1	I Care 4 U	Aaliyah	
February 8	I Care 4 U	Aaliyah	
February 15	I Care 4 U	Aaliyah	
February 22	Get Rich or Die Tryin'	50 Cent	
March 1	Get Rich or Die Tryin'	50 Cent	
March 8	Chocolate Factory	R. Kelly	
March 15	Get Rich or Die Tryin'	50 Cent	
March 22	Get Rich or Die Tryin'	50 Cent	
March 29	Get Rich or Die Tryin'	50 Cent	
April 5	Get Rich or Die Tryin'	50 Cent	
April 12	Diplomatic Immunity	The Diplomats	
April 19	Get Rich or Die Tryin'	50 Cent	
April 26	The Senior	Ginuwine	
May 3	50 Cent: The New Breed	50 Cent	
May 10	Get Rich or Die Tryin'	50 Cent	
May 17	AttenCHUN!	Bone Crusher	
May 24	Body Kiss	The Isley Brothers featuring Ronald Isley	
May 31	Body Kiss	The Isley Brothers featuring Ronald Isley	
June 7	Mississippi: The Album	David Banner	
June 14	Body Kiss	The Isley Brothers featuring Ronald Isley	
June 21	2 Fast 2 Furious	Soundtrack / Various artists	
June 28	Dance With My Father	Luther Vandross	
July 5	Dance With My Father	Luther Vandross	
July 12	Dangerously in Love	Beyoncé	
July 19	Chapter II	Ashanti	
July 26	Chapter II	Ashanti	
August 2	Bad Boys II	Soundtrack / Various artists	
August 9	Bad Boys II	Soundtrack / Various artists	
August 16	Bad Boys II	Soundtrack / Various artists	
August 23	Bad Boys II	Soundtrack / Various artists	
August 30	The Chain Gang Vol. 2	State Property	
September 6	The Neptunes Present... Clones	The Neptunes and Various artists	
September 13	Love & Life	Mary J. Blige	
September 20	Love & Life	Mary J. Blige	
September 27	Drankin' Patnaz	YoungBloodZ	
October 4	Grand Champ	DMX	
October 11	Speakerboxxx/The Love Below	Outkast	
October 18	Too Hot for TV	Da Band	
October 25	Chicken-n-Beer	Ludacris	
November 1	Hard	Jagged Edge	
November 8	Chicken-n-Beer	Ludacris	
November 15	Stroke of Genius	Gerald Levert	
November 22	Blood In My Eye	Ja Rule	
November 29	The Black Album	Jay-Z	
December 6	The Black Album	Jay-Z	
December 13	The Black Album	Jay-Z	
December 20	The Diary of Alicia Keys	Alicia Keys	
December 27	The Diary of Alicia Keys	Alicia Keys	

== See also ==
- 2003 in music
- List of Hot R&B/Hip-Hop Singles & Tracks number ones of 2003
