= Rory Te' Tigo =

German-born British sculptor, artist and musical instrument maker

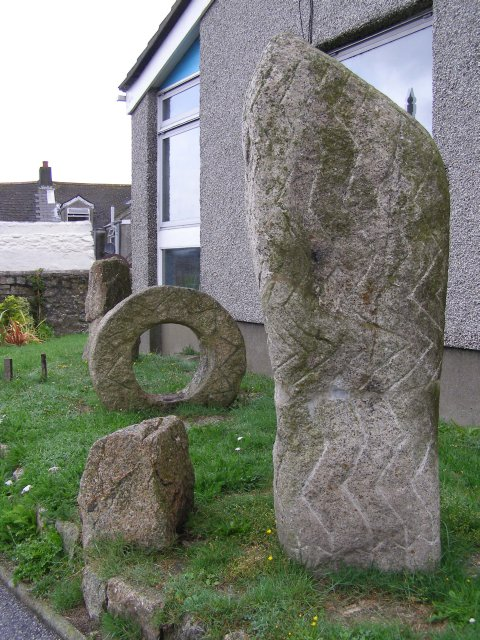
Stone sculptures outside St Just library

Rory Te' Tigo (born 1951) is a sculptor, artist and musical instrument maker originally from Hanover, Germany now living in West Cornwall, United Kingdom. He sculpts in granite and wood and is also a potter. His granite sculptures have been exhibited in various locations in the West Cornwall area, including for many years along the roadside of the A30 trunk road just outside Land's End, Cornwall. His work is executed in a Neo Archaic style, representing themes of Cornish Celtic culture and identity. He calls his style "Organic" or "Floral Cubism."

== Early life and education ==
Te' Tigo completed a BA in fine art at Hanover Fachhochschule fuer Kunst + Design, where he invented his spherical mace stone carving hammer.

== Career ==
Te' Tigo taught pottery and soapstone carving at Volkshochschule Hannover (peoples highschool/open university) and Volkshochschule Sulingen in the early 1990s and gave talks at Hannover / Lower-Saxony State Museum together with Dr. Stephan Veil about replicating and playing stone age drums. He replicated several drums of the globular amphore culture that are now with Hannover / Lower-Saxony State Museum.

After moving to Cornwall, Te' Tigo began to sculpt in local granite/moorstone, using Celtic and archetypal themes.

Te'Tigo contributed to Meyn Mamvro a Cornish earth mysterie's magazine since 1989.

Five of his sculptures, called "The Cornish Uprights" were installed by the A30 between Sennen and Land's End. However, these were later moved to a private garden in Sennen to avoid the expense of liability insurance. After solving the insurance problem Rory Te' Tigo had two further sculptures called "The Surfers" by the side of the A 30 trunk road at the entrance to Sennen, the first and last village in Cornwall, U.K. These have now been removed.

He donated a granite sculpture to the former Cornish Tin Mining town of St Just-in-Penwith, depicting the Men an tol, a local archeological landmark. This is now displayed outside the Library in the town center of St. Just-in-Penwith.

During the summer holidays he used to hold courses in stone carving at Geevor Tin Mine, Pendeen. He leads Well-Walks in the St. Just-in-Penwith area.

He attends meetings of the Penwith Pagan Moot. Rory was a member of the steering committee of C.A.S.P.N. the Cornish Ancient Site Protection Network that aims to protect and preserve ancient sites in Cornwall. Rory Te' Tigo published his first novella titled "Animals" as an e-book in the summer of 2017. A booklet describing his Well Walk is available in St. Just.
