= Release the Beast =

Studio album by Bone Crusher
- Released: July 18, 2006
- Genre: Southern hip-hop
- Length: 48:35
- Label: Body Head Ent.

Bone Crusher chronology
AttenCHUN! (2003)	Release the Beast (2006)	Free (2007)

Professional ratings
Review scores
Source	Rating
HipHopDX	1/5 Xs
RapReviews	6.5/10
XXL	M (2/5)

Release the Beast is the second solo studio album by American rapper Bone Crusher. It was released on July 18, 2006 via Body Head Entertainment. It features guest appearances from Cotton Length, Tezy and Twenty. In the United States, the album peaked at number 86 on the Top R&B/Hip-Hop Albums chart.

== Track listing ==
No.	Title	Length
1.	"We Are" (featuring Twenty, Tezy and Cotton Length)	4:14
2.	"Stomp by the A Town" (featuring Cotton)	4:32
3.	"Lights, Camera, Action"	3:57
4.	"I Do It"	3:26
5.	"Southern Gorillas" (featuring Cotton)	4:45
6.	"Danger" (featuring Tezy)	3:10
7.	"Feel It"	4:02
8.	"Pistol Fo"	4:23
9.	"I'm a Hustler"	3:45
10.	"Mug On"	4:19
11.	"Gotta Get That Money"	4:03
12.	"This One"	3:59
Total length:		48:35

== Charts ==
Chart (2006)	Peak position
US Top R&B/Hip-Hop Albums (Billboard)	86
