= Thuggin' =

Studio album by Magic
- Released: August 31, 1999
- Recorded: 1998–1999
- Genre: Southern hip hop; gangsta rap
- Length: 66:04
- Label: No Limit; Priority
- Producer: Master P (exec.); Carlos Stephens; DJ Jam; Ham; Jay Sinnusta; Ke'Noe; Mark in da Dark; Penitentiary; Alex Sok

Magic chronology
Sky's the Limit (1998)	Thuggin' (1999)	White Eyes (2003)

Professional ratings
Review scores
Source	Rating
AllMusic	2/5 stars

Thuggin' is the second studio album by the American rapper Magic. It was released on August 31, 1999, on No Limit Records and Priority Records. Thuggin' only found minor success compared to his previous album, peaking at number 53 on the Billboard 200 and number 9 on the Top R&B/Hip-Hop Albums chart. The 504 Boyz, which included Magic, remade the song "Wobble Wobble" as their debut single a year later.

== Music videos ==
One music video was shot for the dual single "That's Me"/"Ice on My Wrist", featuring Master P.

== Track listing ==
1. "Beginning" – 0:52
2. "That's Me" – 4:30
3. "Ice on My Wrist – 2:41 (featuring Master P)
4. "Party Time" – 2:07
5. "Wobble Wobble" – 4:03 (featuring C-Murder & Mac)
6. "Soldier" – 4:23 (featuring Suga Bear)
7. "9th Ward" – 3:57
8. "Premeditation" – 0:36 (featuring D.I.G.)
9. "Good Lookin' Out" – 4:25 (featuring D.I.G.)
10. "Do You Really Want Peace" – 3:39 (featuring C-Murder)
11. "Club Thang" – 4:30 (featuring C-Murder & QB)
12. "Puff Puff" – 4:34
13. "Thank You Lord for My Life" – 4:50 (featuring Mia X)
14. "Keep It Gangsta" – 4:34 (featuring Silkk the Shocker)
15. "Freaky" – 3:10 (featuring Ms. Peaches)
16. "We Gon Ride" – 3:43 (featuring C-Murder)
17. "Wanna Get Away" – 3:42 (featuring Ms. Peaches)
18. "Thugs – 3:16
19. "Ending" – 2:14

== Charts ==
Chart (1999)	Peak position
US Billboard 200	53
US Top R&B/Hip-Hop Albums (Billboard)	9
