= Mr. Marcelo =

American rapper (born 1976)

- Born: Jisaidie Hicks; August 13, 1976 (age 49)
- Origin: New Orleans, Louisiana
- Genres: Hip hop, Southern hip hop
- Occupation: Rapper
- Years active: 1999 — present
- Labels: Brick Livin', Jet Life (Current) No Limit, Priority, Ball or Fall (Former)

Mr. Marcelo (born Jisaidie Hicks; August 13, 1976) is an American rapper who was briefly signed to No Limit Records in 2000. Taking his name from New Orleans mobster, Carlos Marcello, Mr. Marcelo released his debut album, Brick Livin' through No Limit Records on July 25, 2000. Though it received good reviews, the album failed to make it very high on the charts, only making it to #172 on the Billboard 200 and #43 on the Top R&B/Hip-Hop Albums.

== Early life ==
Mr. Marcelo was born and raised in the Magnolia Projects of New Orleans, Louisiana. He is the elder brother of rapper Currensy.

== Music career ==
He achieved local success in 1992 with a song called "Hey P-Popper", which was a very popular dance at that time. In 2000 he was featured on the 504 Boyz single "Whodi", and released his first album, Brick Livin', his only hit. In 2001 he released a second album, Streetz Got Luv 4 Me, which was not successful. He released a third album, Still Brick Livin' , in 2004 on his own label, Brick Livin Entertainment, and a fourth album, Son of Magnolia, in 2006 on the Ball or Fall Records label. He has also released several mixtapes through Brick Livin Entertainment.

== Discography ==
=== Studio albums ===
List of studio albums, with selected chart positions
| Title | Album details | Peak chart positions | |
| Title | Album details | US | US R&B |
|---|---|---|---|
| Brick Livin' | Released: July 25, 2000; Label: No Limit, Priority; Format: CD, MD, LP | 127 | 43 |
| Streetz Got Luv 4 Me | Released: July 31, 2001; Label: Tuff-Guys; Format: CD, digital download, LP | – | – |
| Still Brick Livin' | Released: July 24, 2004; Label: Brick Livin; Format: CD, digital download, LP | – | – |
| Son Of Magnolia | Released: September 12, 2006; Label: Ball or Fall; Format: CD, digital download, LP | – | – |

=== Mixtapes ===
Mr. Marcelo's mixtapes and details
| Title | Mixtape details |
|---|---|
| I Don't Talk It, I Live It | Released: November 7, 2008; Label: Self-released |
| 48 Laws of Power | Released: July 12, 2011; Label: Self-released; Hosted by DJ 5150 |
| The Big Homie | Released: February 2, 2012; Label: Jet Life; Hosted by DJ 5150 |
| Return of the Big Homie | Released: March 16, 2013; Label: Jet Life; Hosted by DJ HekTik |
| OG Luv Dat OG | Released: October 31, 2013; Label: Jet Life; Hosted by DJ SWU & JETS |
| OG Luv Dat OG 2 | Released: November 23, 2014; Label: Jet Life; Hosted by DJ SWU & JETS |
| OG Luv Dat OG 3 | Released: August 20, 2015; Label: Jet Life; Hosted by DJ SWU |

== Singles ==
=== As lead artist ===
List of singles as lead artist, with selected chart positions and certifications, showing year released and album name
| Title | Year | Peak chart positions | | | Album |
| Title | Year | US | US R&B | US Rap | Album |
|---|---|---|---|---|---|
| "How U Like It" (featuring Master P) | 1999 | — | — | — | Brick Livin' |
| "Dip & Turn" | 2006 | — | — | — | Son Of Magnolia |

=== As featured artist ===
List of singles as featured artist, with selected chart positions and certifications, showing year released and album name
| Title | Year | Peak chart positions | | | Album |
| Title | Year | US | US R&B | US Rap | Album |
|---|---|---|---|---|---|
| "Whodi" (504 Boyz featuring Mr. Marcelo) | 2000 | — | — | — | Goodfellas |

== See also ==
- No Limit Records
- Curren$y
