= Shell Shocked (album) =

Studio album by Mac
- Released: July 21, 1998
- Recorded: 1997–1998
- Genres: Southern hip-hop; gangsta rap
- Length: 1:12:51
- Labels: No Limit; Priority
- Producer: Beats By The Pound

Mac chronology
The Lyrical Midget (1989)	Shell Shocked (1998)	World War III (1999)

Singles from Shell Shocked
- 1. "Boss Chick" Released: 1998

Shell Shocked is the second solo studio album by American rapper Mac. It was released on July 21, 1998 via No Limit/Priority Records. Production was handled by Beats by the Pound, with Master P serving as executive producer. It features guest appearances from 2-4-1, Big Ed, C-Murder, Fiend, Kane & Abel, Magic, Master P, Mia X, Mo B. Dick, Mr. Serv-On, Mystikal, O'Dell, Silkk the Shocker, Snoop Dogg, Soulja Slim, Storm, and Ms. Peaches.

In the United States, the album debuted at number 11 on the Billboard 200 and number four on the Top R&B/Hip-Hop Albums charts. The album was supported with a single "Boss Chick". In 2025, Pitchfork placed Shell Shocked at number 85 on their list of the 100 Best Rap Albums of All Time.

== Track listing ==
No.	Title	Writer(s)	Producer(s)	Length
1.	"Boss Chick"	McKinley Phipps, Jr.; Mia Young	Carlos Stephens	3:08
2.	"Be All You Can Be"	Phipps, Jr.; Vyshonn Miller; Richard Jones	Mo B. Dick	4:44
3.	"Soldier Party"	Phipps, Jr.; Percy Miller	O'Dell	3:22
4.	"Murda, Murda, Kill, Kill"	Phipps, Jr.; Michael Tyler	KLC	2:27
5.	"Tank Dogs"	Phipps, Jr.; Corey Miller; Jones	Craig B.	3:55
6.	"Slow Ya Roll"	Phipps, Jr.; Odell Vickers, Jr.	Carlos Stephens	4:06
7.	"We Don't Love 'Em"	Phipps, Jr.	KLC	3:11
8.	"Wooo"	Phipps, Jr.; Calvin Broadus; Young; Edward Knight; Corey Smith; Daniel Garcia; David Garcia	KLC	3:44
9.	"Can I Ball"	Phipps, Jr.; James Tapp, Jr.	O'Dell	3:25
10.	"Money Gets It"	Phipps, Jr.; P. Miller	O'Dell	3:08
11.	"The Game"	Phipps, Jr.	KLC	2:57
12.	"Callin' Me"	Phipps, Jr.	Mo B. Dick	4:19
13.	"Memories"	Phipps, Jr.; C. Miller	KLC	3:25
14.	"Meet Me at the Hotel"	Phipps, Jr.; Smith; Awood Johnson, Jr.; Janelle Perrilliat; Raymond Poole	Carlos Stephens; O'Dell; KLC	4:15
15.	"Shell Shocked"	Phipps, Jr.; Jones	Carlos Stephens; O'Dell	2:56
16.	"Paranoid"	Phipps, Jr.; V. Miller	Carlos Stephens	3:45
17.	"Nobody Make a Sound"	Phipps, Jr.; Rechelle Davis; Rechonda Davis; Johnson, Jr.; Jones	Craig B.	2:33
18.	"Beef"	Phipps, Jr.	O'Dell	3:18
19.	"Camouflage Love"	Phipps, Jr.; Perrilliat	DJ Wop	3:27
20.	"Empire"	Phipps, Jr.	KLC	2:55
21.	"My Brother"	Phipps, Jr.	O'Dell	3:22
22.	"Shell Shocked (Outro)"	Phipps, Jr.	KLC	0:29
Total length:				1:12:51

Sample credits

- Track 2 contains an interpolation of "Careless Whisper" by George Michael.
- Track 6 contains an interpolation of "Mama Used to Say" by Junior.
- Track 21 contains an interpolation of "Wednesday Lover" by The Gap Band.

== Personnel ==
- McKinley "Mac" Phipps Jr. – vocals
- Mia "Mia X" Young – vocals (tracks: 1, 8)
- Vyshonn "Silkk the Shocker" Miller – vocals (tracks: 2, 16)
- Richard "Fiend" Jones – vocals (tracks: 2, 5, 15, 17)
- Percy "Master P" Miller – vocals (tracks: 3, 10), executive producer
- Michael "Mystikal" Tyler – vocals (track 4)
- Corey "C-Murder" Miller – vocals (tracks: 5, 13)
- O'Dell Vickers Jr. – vocals (track 6), additional vocals (tracks: 16, 21), producer (tracks: 3, 9, 10, 14, 15, 18, 21)
- Calvin "Snoop Dogg" Broadus – vocals (track 8)
- Edward "Big Ed" Knight – vocals (track 8)
- Corey "Mr. Serv-On" Smith – vocals (tracks: 8, 14)
- Daniel "Kane" Garcia – vocals (track 8)
- David "Abel" Garcia – vocals (track 8)
- James "Soulja Slim" Tapp Jr. – vocals (track 9)
- Awood "Magic" Johnson Jr. – vocals (tracks: 14, 17)
- Janelle "Storm" Perrilliat – vocals (tracks: 14, 19)
- Raymond "Mo B. Dick" Poole – vocals (track 14), producer (tracks: 2, 12)
- Rechelle Davis – vocals (track 17)
- Rechonda Davis – vocals (track 17)
- Peaches – additional vocals (tracks: 12, 19)
- Carlos Stephens – producer (tracks: 1, 6, 14–16)
- Craig "KLC" Lawson – producer (tracks: 4, 7, 8, 11, 13, 14, 20, 22)
- Craig Bazile – producer (tracks: 5, 17)
- Earl "DJ Wop" Register Jr. – producer (track 19)
- Pen & Pixel – artwork
- Duffy Rich – A&R

== Charts ==
=== Weekly charts ===
Chart performance for Shell Shocked
Chart (1998)	Peak position
US Billboard 200	11
US Top R&B/Hip-Hop Albums (Billboard)	4

=== Year-end charts ===
Year-end chart performance for Shell Shocked
Chart (1998)	Position
US Top R&B/Hip-Hop Albums (Billboard)	73
