= Goodfellas (504 Boyz album) =

Studio album by 504 Boyz
- Released: May 2, 2000
- Recorded: 1997–1999
- Genres: Southern hip hop, gangsta rap
- Length: 65:30
- Label: No Limit/Priority
- Producers: Master P (exec.) Carlos Stephens (exec.), The Neptunes, Donald XL Robertson, Suga Bear

504 Boyz chronology
Goodfellas (2000)	Ballers (2002)

Singles from Goodfellas
- 1. "Wobble Wobble" Released: March 28, 2000; 2. "Whodi" Released: June 2000; 3. "D-Game" Released: 2000; 4. "I Can Tell" Released: February 2001

Professional ratings
Review scores
Source	Rating
AllMusic	2.5/5 stars
Los Angeles Times	2/4 stars
The Rolling Stone Album Guide	2/5 stars
The Source	3.5/5 stars
USA Today	2.5/4 stars

Goodfellas is the debut album by the American hip-hop group 504 Boyz, released on May 2, 2000, by No Limit Records and Priority Records. 504 Boyz consisted of Master P, Silkk the Shocker, Mystikal, C-Murder, Mac, Krazy and Magic. The production was handled by the Neptunes, Carlos Stephens and Donald XL Robertson, while the album features No Limit labelmates Snoop Dogg, Mercedes, Erica Foxx, Samm, Black Felon/X-Con, Ms. Peaches, Mr. Marcelo, Jamo, Traci/Baby Girl, D.I.G. and Ghetto Commission; other guest performers include Pusha T (billed as Terrar), Pharrell Williams and RBX. A tandem of the songs—such as "Beefing", "I Can Tell", and "No Limit"—were previously released on No Limit's 1999 albums.

Goodfellas debuted atop the Top R&B/Hip-Hop Albums chart and at number 2 on the Billboard 200, with first-week sales of 139,000 copies in the US. The album was supported by two singles: "Wobble Wobble", which peaked at number 17 on the Billboard Hot 100 and number 1 on the Hot Rap Singles, and "Whodi". Planning of the album dates back to 1997, as promotional materials can be found in the liner notes of 1997 No Limit releases. Goodfellas received Gold certification by the Recording Industry Association of America (RIAA) on July 17, 2000.

== Track listing ==
No.	Title	Producer(s)	Length
1.	"Intro" (Lil' Romeo, Master P)	Carlos Stephens	0:47
2.	"Roll, Roll" (Master P, Krazy, Mystikal, Silkk the Shocker)	Ezell Swang	3:30
3.	"Big Toyz" (Mac, Krazy, D.I.G.)	Carlos Stephens	3:29
4.	"Whodi" (Master P, Magic, Mr. Marcelo, C-Murder, Mystikal, Silkk the Shocker)	Carlos Stephens	4:30
5.	"Wobble Wobble" (Master P, Mac, Silkk the Shocker, Magic, Krazy, Mystikal, C-Murder)	Carlos Stephens	3:34
6.	"Check 'Em" (Master P, Traci)	Donald XL Robertson	2:06
7.	"Uptown" (Master P, Mac, C-Murder)	Carlos Stephens, Suga Bear, Penitentiary	3:40
8.	"I Can Tell" (Mercedes, Ms. Peaches, Mac, Jamo)	Carlos Stephens	3:30
9.	"Commercial"		0:31
10.	"If You Real, Keep It Real" (Master P, Silkk the Shocker)	Carlos Stephens, Mike Diesel	5:03
11.	"Beefing" (Mac)	Penitentiary, Suga Bear	3:16
12.	"We Bust" (Silkk the Shocker, Krazy, Ghetto Commission)	Carlos Stephens	3:15
13.	"Thug Girl II" (Master P, Silkk the Shocker, Krazy)	Carlos Stephens	3:26
14.	"Life is Serious" (Master P, Krazy, Mac, Erica Foxx)	Ezell Swang	2:50
15.	"Them Boyz" (Master P, X-Con, and Mac)	Kenoe	2:26
16.	"Moving Things" (Master P, Samm, Erica Foxx)	Carlos Stephens	4:05
17.	"Commercial II"	Carlos Stephens	1:12
18.	"D-Game" (Master P, Pharrell Williams, Terrar, Krazy)	The Neptunes	2:47
19.	"Enemies" (X-Con)	Ezell Swang	2:13
20.	"Souljas" (Snoop Dogg, Master P, Krazy, RBX)	Carlos Stephens, Fredwreck	3:26
21.	"No Limit" (Magic)	Suga Bear	2:48
22.	"Say Brah" (Master P and Mac)	Donald XL Robertson	3:06

== Charts ==
=== Weekly charts ===
Chart (2000)	Peak position
US Billboard 200	2
US Top R&B/Hip-Hop Albums (Billboard)	1

=== Year-end charts ===
Chart (2000)	Position
US Billboard 200	96
US Top R&B/Hip-Hop Albums (Billboard)	28

== Certifications ==
Region	Certification	Certified units/sales
United States (RIAA)	Gold	500,000^{^}
^{^} Shipments figures based on certification alone.

== See also ==
- List of number-one R&B albums of 2000 (U.S.)
