= AttenCHUN! =

Studio album by Bone Crusher
- Released: April 29, 2003
- Recorded: 2002–2003
- Genre: Hardcore hip hop, gangsta rap, crunk
- Length: 57:33
- Label: So So Def; Arista
- Producer: Jermaine Dupri

Bone Crusher chronology
AttenCHUN! (2003)	Release the Beast (2006)

Singles from AttenCHUN!
- 1. "Never Scared" Released: April 8, 2003

AttenCHUN! is the debut studio album by rapper Bone Crusher. Produced by Jermaine Dupri, the album was released on April 29, 2003 by So So Def Recordings and Arista Records. The album's only single "Never Scared", which featured fellow rappers Killer Mike and T.I., was featured on BET and Madden NFL 2004. The album received a mixed reception from critics regarding its production, overreliance on interludes and Crusher's vocal delivery.

== Critical reception ==
Professional ratings
Review scores
Source	Rating
AllMusic	4/5 stars
HipHopDX	4/5 stars
Rolling Stone	2/5 stars

AttenCHUN! received mixed reviews from music critics who questioned the production, overreliance on interludes and Crusher's vocal delivery. Rob Theakston of AllMusic said that despite the album feeling over-stuffed with clichéd interludes and stale beats, he praised Crusher's vocal delivery for being interesting and working well with the featured guests, saying that "it's still better than most coming out of the Dirty South in 2003." HipHopDX writer Jacintah also commented on the lacking production and Crusher's delivery on the hooks as negatives but still complimented the album for showcasing Crusher's charismatic delivery and being able to transcend different emotions throughout the tracks. Spyce of The Situation said that after the second track, the album begins to go flat in its beats and Crusher's hard-edged delivery starts to meander, saying that "Even die hard fans will be hard pressed to find anything fresh and unexpected on this album which results in you feeling that you missed out on something." Rolling Stone criticized the album for being over-packed with production and vocals that were lacking and monotonous.

== Track listing ==
No.	Title	Writer(s)	Producer(s)	Length
1.	"Lock & Load"	Wayne Hardnett; James Phillips	Priest; LRoc	3:57
2.	"Never Scared (Intro)" (featuring Jermaine Dupri)			0:31
3.	"Never Scared" (featuring Killer Mike and T.I.)	W. Hardnett; Avery Johnson; Michael Render; Clifford Harris	Avery Johnson	5:19
4.	"Back Up" (featuring Dru)	W. Hardnett; Phillips; Andrew Matey	Priest; LRoc	4:16
5.	"Grippin' the Grain" (featuring Lady Ice and Marcus)	W. Hardnett; A. Johnson; Chestdra Brown; Marcus	Avery Johnson	4:59
6.	"Transaction (Interlude)" (featuring Young "Shawty" Hughley)			0:31
7.	"Puttin' in Work" (featuring David Banner and Lady Ice)	W. Hardnett; A. Johnson; Lavell Crump; Brown	Avery Johnson	4:24
8.	"Break 'Em Off for Life (Interlude)" (featuring Hezo, Dano, Jack Frost and Rico Love)			1:41
9.	"Gettin' It (Get Dat Money)" (featuring Jack Frost)	W. Hardnett; A. Johnson; Kevin Short	Avery Johnson	3:39
10.	"It's Me (Lane to Lane)" (featuring Lil Jon and Chyna Whyte)	W. Hardnett; A. Johnson; Jonathan Smith; Stephanie Martin	Avery Johnson	3:39
11.	"For the Streets"	W. Hardnett; Phillips	Priest; LRoc	1:43
12.	"Sound the Horn" (featuring Bizar)	W. Hardnett; A. Johnson; Vita Brinson	Avery Johnson	3:29
13.	"Hate Ourselves" (featuring Goodie Mob)	W. Hardnett; Michael O. Johnson; Cameron Gipp; Willie Knighton; Robert Barnett	Mixzo	4:45
14.	"Vainglorious (Interlude)"			0:52
15.	"Ghetto Song" (featuring Lil' Pete of D.S.G.B.)	W. Hardnett; Conrad Rosser; Chris Rosser; Bob James	Brad & Water	5:37
16.	"Peaches & Cream"	W. Hardnett; Phillips	Priest; LRoc; Craig Love (co.)	4:45
17.	"The Wall" (featuring Chris Hardnett and Baby B.)	W. Hardnett; William L. Whedbee; Jarrelle Anderson	Billy Hume	3:26

=== Bonus track listing ===
1. "Never Scared (The Takeover Remix)" (featuring Cam'ron, Jadakiss & Busta Rhymes)
2. "Never Scared (Football Remix)"

Sample credits

- "Ghetto Song" contains samples from "Snowbird Fantasy", written and performed by Bob James.

== Charts ==
=== Weekly charts ===
Chart (2003)	Peak position
US Billboard 200	11
US Top R&B/Hip-Hop Albums (Billboard)	1

=== Year-end charts ===
Chart (2003)	Position
US Billboard 200	172
US Top R&B/Hip-Hop Albums (Billboard)	47

== See also ==
- List of Billboard number-one R&B albums of 2003
