= Ms. Chocolate =

Single by Lil Jon featuring R. Kelly and Mario

from the album Crunk Rock
- Released: March 30, 2010
- Recorded: 2006–2007
- Genre: Hip-hop; crunk; R&B
- Length: 3:19
- Label: BME; Universal
- Songwriters: Jonathan Smith; Robert Kelly; Claude Kelly; Christopher Gholson
- Producers: Lil Jon; Drumma Boy

Lil Jon singles chronology
"Watagatapitusberry" (2009)	"Ms. Chocolate" (2010)	"Hey" (2010)

R. Kelly singles chronology
"Echo" (2009)	"Ms. Chocolate" (2010)	"Sign of a Victory" (2010)

Mario singles chronology
"Headboard" (2009)	"Ms. Chocolate" (2010)	"Somebody Else" (2013)

"Ms. Chocolate" is the first official single from American rapper Lil Jon's debut solo album Crunk Rock. The song features American R&B singers R. Kelly and Mario.

== Background and release ==
In June 2006, Lil Jon announced that he planned to include collaborations with R. Kelly and Mario on a single. The song was released on iTunes on March 30, 2010, just a few days after its premiere on MySpace.

Lil Jon stated that he is tired of hearing praises of light-skinned girls and dedicated a song to dark-skinned or "chocolate" girls.

== Music video ==
The music video premiered May 10, it was shot in Columbus, Ohio.

== Charts ==
Chart (2010)	Peak position
Dutch Singles Chart	7
U.S. Billboard Hot R&B/Hip-Hop Songs	77
