= Never Scared (song) =

Single by Bone Crusher featuring Killer Mike and T.I.

from the album AttenCHUN!
- Released: April 8, 2003
- Genre: Hardcore hip hop; crunk
- Length: 5:19
- Label: So So Def; Arista
- Songwriters: Wayne Hardnett; Avery Johnson; Michael Render; Clifford Harris
- Producer: Avery Johnson

Bone Crusher singles chronology
"Never Scared" (2003)	"Fat Man Stomp" (2003)

Killer Mike singles chronology
"Land of a Million Drums" (2003)	"Never Scared" (2003)	"A.D.I.D.A.S." (2003)

T.I. singles chronology
"Never Scared" (2003)	"24's" (2003)

"Never Scared" is a song by American hip hop recording artist Bone Crusher, released as his debut single and the lead single from his debut album, AttenCHUN!. The song was produced by Avery Johnson and features verses from fellow Atlanta-based rappers Killer Mike and T.I. The song became a Top 40 hit, reaching number 26 on the US Billboard Hot 100 chart, while also reaching the top 10 of the Billboard Hot R&B Hip-Hop and Rap charts. The success of the single propelled AttenCHUN! to reach number one on the Top R&B/Hip-Hop Albums, although Bone Crusher's success would be short-lived as "Never Scared" would be his only charting single. The song, however, was only the first of many future hit singles for T.I.

The official remix (dubbed "The Takeover Remix") features verses by New York–based rappers Cam'ron, Jadakiss and Busta Rhymes. The song was used by the Atlanta Braves as its theme song for the 2003 season. A customized version of the song is also featured on the video game Madden NFL 04, which replaces most of the original lyrics with football-related lyrics.

In 2015 Bone Crusher reprises a version of the chorus from "Never Scared" for the song "All of Me" from WAOR (also ft. Josh Mckay) The song is featured on WAORs EP "Get Ready For WAOR" released October 1, 2016.

== Controversy ==
According to the Washington Post and Mississippi Clarion Ledgar, the song was originally recorded by Mississippi rap duo Reese & Bigalow, as well as Bone Crusher and Killer Mike. Reese & Bigalow accused Bone Crusher of taking Never Scared, removing their verses and adding T.I.'s verse in place of theirs.

== Chart history ==
=== Weekly charts ===
Chart (2003)	Peak position
Billboard Hot 100	26
Billboard Hot R&B/Hip-Hop Singles & Tracks	8
Billboard Hot Rap Singles	6

=== Year-end charts ===
Chart (2003)	Position
Billboard Hot R&B/Hip-Hop Singles & Tracks	43
