= Spitta =

Spitta is a surname. Notable people with the surname include:

- Friedrich Spitta (1852–1924), German Protestant theologian
- Heinrich Spitta (1902–1972), German music educator
- Melanie Spitta (1946-2005), German and Sinti film-maker
- Philipp Spitta (1841–1894), German music historian and musicologist
- Philipp Spitta (poet) (1801–1859), German Protestant religious poet
