= Breather Life =

Studio album by Krazy
- Released: August 7, 2001
- Recorded: 2000–2001
- Genre: Hip-hop
- Label: Soulja Army, Southwest
- Producer: Master P (exec.), Carlos Stephens, Donald XL Robertson, Myke Diesel, Suga Bear, Ezel Swang

Krazy chronology
Please Don't Kill Me (1999)	Breather Life (2001)

Professional ratings
Review scores
Source	Rating
AllMusic	link
Entertainment Weekly	B-
HipHopDX	3/5 stars

Breather Life is the fourth studio album released by rapper, Krazy, his first for a major label. It was released on August 7, 2001, through Soulja Army. It features production from Carlos Stephens and Donald XL Robertson. It was independently released through No Limit's newly created sub-label Soulja Army. It peaked at No. 91 on the Top R&B/Hip-Hop Albums chart and No. 31 on the Top Independent Albums chart in Billboard magazine.

== Track listing ==
1. "Intro"- 2:07
2. "What Y'all Want"- 3:15 (featuring Snoop Dogg)
3. "Get Bucked"- 2:47 (featuring Slay Sean)
4. "My Dog"- 3:25 (featuring Lyric)
5. "In tha Sky"- 1:13
6. "I Luv My Project"- 4:12 (featuring Master P & Ezel Swang)
7. "Tell Me"- 4:14 (featuring D.I.G.)
8. "For Sure"- 4:50 (featuring Short Circuit)
9. "Thugged Out"- 4:05 (featuring Soulja Slim)
10. "I Got"- 3:33 (featuring Erica Fox)
11. "Downtown"- 3:58 (featuring Suga Bear)
12. "Black Eyez"- 4:21 (featuring Ed West)
13. "I Know"- 3:26 (featuring Suga Bear)
14. "In the Club"- 4:35 (featuring Soulja Slim)
15. "I Still"- 3:47 (featuring C-Murder)
16. "When I Make It Home"- 3:27 (feat. Dolliollie of the Ghetto Commission)
17. "The Truth"- 3:54
18. "War"- 4:21 (featuring Desperado of Afficial, Slay Sean & Traci)

== Personnel ==
- Afficial - Performer, Primary Artist
- Baby Girl - Performer, Primary Artist
- C-Murder - Guest Artist, Performer, Primary Artist
- D.I.G. - Performer-Primary Artist
- Erica Fox - Performer Primary Artist
- Leslie Henderson - Photography
- Colin Jahn - Art Direction, Design
- Krazy - Performer
- Lyric - Guest Artist, Performer, Primary Artist
- Master P - Performer, Primary Artist
- Donald "XL" Robertson - Producer
- Slay Sean - Primary Artist
- Short Circuit - Performer, Primary Artist
- Snoop Dogg - Guest Artist, Performer, Primary Artist
- Soulja Slim - Guest Artist, Performer, Primary Artist
- Carlos Stephens - Producer
- Suga Bear - Guest Artist, Primary Artist, Producer, Vocals
- Ezel Swang - Primary Artist, Producer, Vocals
- Ed West - Performer, Primary Artist

== Chart positions ==
Chart (2001)	Peak position
US Top R&B/Hip-Hop Albums	91
US Top Independent Albums	31
