= Snap Yo Fingers =

2006 single by Lil Jon

Single by Lil Jon featuring E-40 and Sean Paul of YoungBloodZ

from the album Crunk Rock (intended) and Crunk Hits, Vol. 2
- Released: April 11, 2006
- Recorded: 2005
- Genre: Crunk; snap
- Length: 4:34
- Label: TVT; BME
- Songwriters: Jonathan Smith; Earl Stevens; Sean Paul Joseph; Alphonzo Bailey
- Producer: Lil Jon

Lil Jon singles chronology
"Toma" (2005)	"Snap Yo Fingers" (2006)	"Act a Fool" (2006)

E-40 singles chronology
"Tell Me When to Go" (2006)	"Snap Yo Fingers" (2006)	"U and Dat" (2006)

Music video
- "Snap Yo Fingers" on YouTube

"Snap Yo Fingers" is a song by American rapper Lil Jon. It was originally intended to be the first single from Lil Jon's solo debut album, Crunk Rock. However, the release date of Crunk Rock was subsequently delayed. In August 2006, Lil Jon's label TVT Records released the second volume of its Crunk Hits compilation, and "Snap Yo Fingers" was the opening track. When Crunk Rock was finally released four years later, the song was left out of the album.

The song was produced by Lil Jon and features E-40 and Sean Paul of YoungBloodZ. The catchy, club oriented Southern hip-hop track allowed the song to peak at number 7 on the U.S. Billboard Hot 100.

On the Billboard Hot 100 and Hot R&B/Hip-Hop Songs charts, the song reached number seven and one, respectively. The music video was directed by Hype Williams.

== Remix ==
The official remix features additional vocals by Lil Jon and verses by rappers Sun-E and Chyna Whyte.

== Track listing ==
1. "Snap Yo Fingers" (Radio Edit) – 4:34
2. "Snap Yo Fingers" (Explicit version) – 4:34
3. "Snap Yo Fingers" (Instrumental version) – 4:34
4. "Snap Yo Fingers" (A cappella version) – 4:09

== Chart positions ==
=== Weekly charts ===
Chart (2006)	Peak position
Australia (ARIA)	57
Germany (GfK)	89
New Zealand (Recorded Music NZ)	14
US Billboard Hot 100	7
US Hot R&B/Hip-Hop Songs (Billboard)	1
US Pop Airplay (Billboard)	25
US Pop 100 (Billboard)	18
US Rhythmic Airplay (Billboard)	1

=== Year-end charts ===
Chart (2006)	Position
US Billboard Hot 100	24
US Hot R&B/Hip-Hop Songs (Billboard)	8
US Rhythmic (Billboard)	2

== Certifications ==
Region	Certification	Certified units/sales
New Zealand (RMNZ)	Platinum	30,000^{‡}
United States (RIAA)	Platinum	1,000,000^{^}
^{^} Shipments figures based on certification alone.^{‡} Sales+streaming figures based on certification alone.
