= Sky's the Limit (Magic album) =

Skys the Limit

Studio album by Magic
- Released: September 15, 1998
- Recorded: 1998
- Genre: Southern hip-hop; gangsta rap
- Length: 1:15:21
- Label: TRU; No Limit; Priority
- Producer: Carlos Stephens; Craig B; DJ Daryl; KLC; Mark In The Dark; Mo B. Dick; MP; O'Dell

Magic chronology
Skys the Limit (1998)	Thuggin' (1999)

Professional ratings
Review scores
Source	Rating
AllMusic	3/5 stars

Skys the Limit is the debut studio album by American rapper Magic. It was released on September 15, 1998, through TRU/No Limit/Priority Records. The album was produced by Carlos Stephens, Craig B, DJ Daryl, KLC, Mark in the Dark, Mo B. Dick, MP, and O'Dell. It features guest appearances from Big Ed, C-Murder, Fiend, Gambino Family, Ghetto Commission, Kane & Abel, KLC, Lady TRU, Lil' D, Mac, Master P, Mia X, Mo B. Dick, Mystikal, Prime Suspects, Silkk the Shocker, Snoop Dogg, Sons of Funk, Soulja Slim, and Steady Mobb'n.

The album debuted at number 15 on the Billboard 200 and number 3 on the Top R&B/Hip-Hop Albums charts in the United States, selling 105,551 copies in its first week. It was supported by the only promotional single "No Hope".

== Track listing ==
No.	Title	Producer(s)	Length
1.	"Intro"	Mo B. Dick	0:25
2.	"Ghetto Godzilla" (featuring Master P)	KLC	2:16
3.	"Did What I Had 2" (featuring Mystikal)	O'Dell	4:01
4.	"Depend on Me" (featuring C-Murder)	Mo B. Dick	3:50
5.	"9th Ward"	O'Dell	3:51
6.	"No Hope" (featuring C-Murder, Sons of Funk and Lady TRU)	O'Dell; KLC	3:49
7.	"Take It to da Streets"	KLC	2:37
8.	"Ball 'Til We Fall" (featuring C-Murder)	Mark In The Dark	2:56
9.	"I Got Love 4 Ya" (featuring Steady Mobb'n and Snoop Dogg)	O'Dell	4:59
10.	"I Never"	KLC	2:44
11.	"Money Don't Make Me" (featuring C-Murder and Soulja Slim)	Craig B.	3:25
12.	"Skys the Limit" (featuring Mia X)	MP	4:55
13.	"No Limit" (featuring C-Murder and Snoop Dogg)	Mark In The Dark	4:11
14.	"New Generation" (featuring Fiend and Mac)	KLC	3:04
15.	"What I Gotta" (featuring Silkk the Shocker and Mo B. Dick)	Craig B.	4:00
16.	"Hard Times" (featuring C-Murder)	Craig B.	2:37
17.	"Life Is a Bitch"	D.J. Darryl	4:30
18.	"Gimpin'" (featuring Kane & Abel, Big Ed and Mac)	KLC	4:33
19.	"Special Forces" (featuring Da Commission)	Carlos Stephens	4:01
20.	"When Drama Came" (featuring Fiend and Snoop Dogg)	Mark In The Dark	3:38
21.	"Mobb 4 Ever" (featuring C-Murder, Fiend, Prime Suspects, Gambino Family and KLC)	Craig B.	4:12
22.	"Chastity" (featuring Lil' D.)	KLC	5:17
Total length:			1:15:21

== Charts ==
Chart (1998)	Peak position
US Billboard 200	15
US Top R&B/Hip-Hop Albums (Billboard)	3
