= Crunk Rock =

Studio album by Lil Jon
- Released: June 8, 2010
- Recorded: 2005–2010
- Genres: Hip-hop; crunk; crunkcore; Eurodance
- Length: 71:54
- Labels: BME; Universal Republic
- Producers: Andre Harris; Benny Blanco; Catalyst; Dave Moreaux; Detail; DJ Chuckie; DJ Montay; David Guetta; Dr. Luke; Drumma Boy; Kassiano; K.E. on the Track; Kool Kojak; LMFAO; R. City; RedOne; Shawty Redd; Silvio Ecomo; Steve Aoki; Swizz Beatz; Vidal Davis; Whole Wheat Bread

Lil Jon chronology
MTV VMA Score (2010)	Crunk Rock (2010)	Total Meditation (2024)

Singles from Crunk Rock
- 1. "Ms. Chocolate" Released: March 30, 2010; 2. "Hey" Released: June 15, 2010; 3. "Machuka" Released: August 5, 2010

Crunk Rock is the debut solo studio album and sixth overall album by American rapper Lil Jon, released on June 8, 2010 by BME and Universal Republic. The characters at the bottom of the album's cover are Japanese katakana characters, which read "Kurunku Rokku", an approximation of the Japanese transliteration of the album's title. The album predominantly consists of guest appearances from artists including Ice Cube, Pitbull, Ying Yang Twins, Waka Flocka Flame, The Game, Travis Porter, Damian Marley, Soulja Boy, R. Kelly and Whole Wheat Bread; the latter of whom assisted with its production alongside Drumma Boy, Benny Blanco, Dr. Luke, Steve Aoki, R. City and Shawty Redd, among others. Crunk Rock received mixed reviews and peaked within the top 50 of the Billboard 200.

== Background and recording ==
Work on the album began in June 2005. In May 2006, MTV reported that it would be released late that summer or in early fall. At that time he announced that he was relocating to Las Vegas where the album would be recorded, and that half of the album would be similar in style to his 2003 single "Get Low". In June that year, recording had started, and Lil Jon announced that he planned to include collaborations with R. Kelly, Mariah Carey, and Snoop Dogg on the album, and the first single from the album sessions, "Snap Yo Fingers" was released, reaching number 7 on the Billboard Hot 100. In January 2007, it was reported that Lil Jon was still in the studio working on the album, and that recorded tracks included "Roll Call" featuring Lil Wayne and Ciara, and tracks featuring R. Kelly and Nate Dogg. The prospective release date at that time was Spring 2007. At this time he was already indicating problems with the record label, stating that he "was going through the drama with TVT Records". By August 2007, the album's release date had slipped again, with late 2007 the expected date. The list of guest artists had by this time expanded to include Game, Ice Cube, P.O.D. and Kid Rock, with Jon explaining that "the concept of the album is that it is [a] merger of rock and hip-hop styles, utilising the different styles of the guest contributors." By November 2007, however, the album was reported to be "65 percent, maybe 70 percent done", with a release now expected in 2008, with Lil Jon taking time out to DJ and do voiceover work in Hollywood. A demo of "What a Night" featuring Jay Sean was also recorded, but it did not make the final track listing.

By March 2008, the problems with TVT had intensified, with record label TVT described by MTV as having gone from "having money to burn to being on the verge of folding", and Lil Jon said to have experienced legal issues with the label over money. While work on the album was interrupted, with Lil Jon citing the stress of the TVT situation as causing him to take a complete break from recording the album, he had worked with other artists such as Flo Rida and Pharrell Williams, and had done production work on E-40's Ball Street Journal album. The TVT label filed for bankruptcy in February 2008, putting the album's release in doubt. By August 2008, Lil Jon had freed himself from his contract with TVT, giving him the rights to the master recordings for Crunk Rock, in return for dropping his objection to the sale of TVT's assets to The Orchard Group. He restarted work on the album and stated that he was considering a new "world music" direction for the album and a possible change of title, saying "I'm touching so many different kinds of people on this album as well as keeping my core fan base at the same time." In October 2008, Lil Jon signed to Universal Republic and the album was rescheduled for a release in early 2009. In March 2009, two mixtapes appeared from Lil Jon, Rockbox Vol. 1 and 2, with Rolling Stone announcing that Crunk Rock was expected later in 2009. Indeed, the second volume closed with Jon stating "Crunk Rock coming sooooooon".

By September 2009 a new date of November 24 was announced for the album's release, although it was still unfinished. Confirmed guests additionally included Roscoe Dash, Mariah Carey, 3OH!3, Whole Wheat Bread, David Guetta, Steve Aoki, LMFAO, Zuper Blahq, DJ Chuckie, Laidback Luke, Elephant Man, Pastor Troy, Ying Yang Twins, Akon, Mario, R. Kelly, T-Pain, Soulja Boy Tell 'Em, and Pitbull. Another single from the album, the RedOne-produced "Give It All U Got", was announced, with a promotional video filmed in Miami in September. Lil Jon stated the album would now be more eclectic than previously envisaged with elements of house music, pop and R&B. By October 2009, Lil Jon described the album as "80 percent done", with all tracks recorded but "some final touches" still required, with the release date pushed back to early 2010. The new single from the album, the disco-tinged "Give It All U Got", was released in November 2009. Lil Jon held a listening session for the album in 2010. Rap-Up reported that the album was set for a June 8, 2010 release. In an interview with Billboard in May 2010 Lil Jon confirmed that Crunk Rock would be released on June 8. The album was released in standard and deluxe editions.

== Singles ==
=== Official singles ===
- "Ms. Chocolate", which features R. Kelly and Mario and was produced by Drumma Boy, was released as the first single on March 30, 2010.
- "Hey", which features 3OH!3 was released as the second single.
- "Machuka", which features Brazilian recording artists Mr. Catra and Mulher Filé, was released as third single only in Brazil.

=== Promotional singles ===
- "Snap Yo Fingers" was released as the first promotional single on February 4, 2006. The single peaked at 7 in the United States, and topped the US R&B/Hip Hop and US Rap charts. However, the song did not make it for the album, and it was released as a single only. It was released six months later as the opening track to Crunk Hits, Vol. 2.
- "Act a Fool", which features Three 6 Mafia, was released as the second promotional single on November 7, 2006. It peaked at 91 on the US R&B/Hip-Hop chart. It was not featured in the album.
- "I Do", which features Swizz Beatz and Snoop Dogg, was released as the third promotional single on July 21, 2009. It peaked at 101 on the US R&B/Hip Hop. It was not featured in the album.
- "Give It All U Got", which features Kee on the original version and also features British rapper Tinchy Stryder on the official remix (along with Kee), was released as the fourth promotional single on November 3, 2009. It peaked at 90 on the Canadian Hot 100. However, it did not make the final cut for the album.
- "Outta Your Mind", which features LMFAO, was released as the fifth promotional single on March 23, 2010. It peaked at 28 on Billboard's Rap Digital Songs chart. Benny Benassi, DJ Chuckie, A-Trak, David Guetta, Steve Aoki and Travis Barker appear in the music video which was filmed in Miami, Florida. It also debuted at 84 on the Billboard Hot 100.

== Reception ==
=== Commercial performance ===
The album debuted at number 49 on the US Billboard 200 chart with first-week sales of 8,900 copies. The low number of albums sold was said to be the sales surprise of the week by HipHopDX. It sold 4,700 copies the second week, bring the total to 14,000 copies sold in the US.

=== Critical response ===
Professional ratings
Review scores
Source	Rating
AllMusic	3/5 stars
HipHopDX	2.5/5
RapReviews	5/10
Slant Magazine	2.5/5 stars
USA Today	2.5/4 stars

Upon its release, the album received generally mixed reviews from music critics. AllMusic writer David Jeffries gave it 3 out of 5 stars and called it "a scattershot set of tracks that just barely fit together, but take into consideration the label problems and legal issues the producer has faced since the album's conception, and it becomes a scruffy mess you just might cheer on". Emanuel Wallace of RapReviews gave Crunk Rock a 5/10 rating and wrote "If you're looking for lyrical greatness, you'll be disappointed. If you want an album filled with nothing but trunk-rattling beats you'll be disappointed". Slant Magazine writer Jesse Cataldo gave the album 2½ out of 5 stars and described its songs as "thick, silly concoctions, glazed with bass and defined by endless repetition, whirlwinds of chants and shouts that circle like demented carousels". The New York Times writer Jon Caramanica commended the album's production, but ultimately expressed a negative response towards Lil Jon's lyrics, writing "he retains his trademark ignorance and indignation: plenty of the most salacious material here is his own... he’s back to noisily asserting primacy through fight chants". USA Today's Steve Jones gave it 2½ out of 4 stars and shared a similar sentiment, stating "He has mixed more rock and electronica in with the thumping bass lines, but the message remains the same: Get up and jam, or go home". Slava Kuperstein of HipHopDX gave it a 2.5/5 rating and in conclusion of the album said "With the kind of clout Lil Jon has, it's disappointing he wasn't able to come up with a better supporting cast (especially given his features in the past), which makes for an equally disappointing album."

== Track listing ==
Crunk Rock track listing
No.	Title	Writer(s)	Producer(s)	Length
1.	"Crunk Rock" (Intro)	Jonathan Smith	Lil Jon	0:50
2.	"Throw It Up (Part 2) (Remix)" (featuring Pastor Troy and Waka Flocka Flame)	J. Smith; Christopher Gholson; Craig Love; Micah Troy; William Holmes	Drumma Boy; Lil Jon	5:14
3.	"G Walk" (featuring Soulja Boy)	J. Smith; Demetrius Stewart; Dwayne Richardson; W. Holmes; DeAndre Way	Shawty Redd; Lil Jon	3:35
4.	"On de Grind" (featuring Stephen Marley & Damian "Jr. Gong" Marley)	J. Smith; Gholson; Damian Marley; W. Holmes; Che Smith; Timothy Thomas; Theron Thomas	Drumma Boy; Lil Jon	4:18
5.	"What Is Crunk Rock?" (Interlude)	J. Smith	Lil Jon	0:33
6.	"Killas" (featuring Ice Cube, The Game, Elephant Man, & Whole Wheat Bread)	J. Smith; Jayceon Taylor; O'Shea Jackson; O'Neil Bryan; W. Holmes; Aaron Abraham; Joseph Largen; James Phillips	Lil Jon	3:46
7.	"Get In Get Out"	J. Smith; Mitch Cohn; Noel Fisher; Eric Jackson; Deongelo Holmes; W. Holmes	Catalyst; Lil Jon; Detail (co.)	4:26
8.	"Outta Your Mind" (featuring LMFAO)	J. Smith; Skyler Gordy; Stefan Gordy	LMFAO; Lil Jon	4:11
9.	"Ride da D" (featuring Ying Yang Twins)	J. Smith; D. Holmes; E. Jackson	Lil Jon	3:50
10.	"Ms. Chocolate" (featuring R. Kelly and Mario)	J. Smith; Gholson; Robert Kelly; Claude Kelly; W. Holmes	Drumma Boy; Lil Jon	3:20
11.	"Like a Stripper" (featuring Pleasure P and Shawty Putt)	J. Smith; W. Holmes; Marcus Cooper; Robert Waller; Kwame Buchanan; Sean Chavis; James Hardnett	Lil Jon	3:33
12.	"Shots" (LMFAO featuring Lil Jon)	J. Smith; Skyler Gordy; Stefan Gordy; Eric Delatorre	LMFAO; Lil Jon	3:38
13.	"Work It Out" (featuring Pitbull)	J. Smith; Armando Pérez; Clyde Sergio Narain; Fabian Lenssen; Rabun Brunnings	DJ Chuckie; Dave Moreaux; Silvio Ecomo; Lil Jon	3:44
14.	"Hey" (featuring 3OH!3)	Smith; Lukasz Gottwald; Sean Foreman; Nathaniel Motte; W. Holmes	Dr. Luke; 3OH!3 (co.); Lil Jon (co.)	3:35

Deluxe edition
No.	Title	Writer(s)	Producer(s)	Length
1.	"Crunk Rock" (Intro)	J. Smith	Lil Jon	0:49
2.	"Throw It Up (Part 2) (Remix)" (featuring Pastor Troy and Waka Flocka Flame)	J. Smith; Gholson; Love; Troy; W. Holmes	Drumma Boy; Lil Jon	5:14
3.	"Fall Out" (featuring Travis Porter)	J. Smith; Kevin Erondu; Donquez Woods; Lakeem Mattox; Harold Duncan	K.E. on the Track; Lil Jon	3:53
4.	"G Walk" (featuring Soulja Boy)	Smith; Stewart; Richardson; W. Holmes; Way	Shawty Redd; Lil Jon	3:35
5.	"On de Grind" (featuring Stephen Marley and Damian "Jr. Gong" Marley)	J. Smith; Gholson; D. Marley; W. Holmes; C. Smith; Timothy Thomas; Theron Thomas	Drumma Boy; Lil Jon	4:18
6.	"What Is Crunk Rock?" (Interlude)	J. Smith	Lil Jon	0:32
7.	"Killas" (featuring Ice Cube, The Game, Elephant Man, and Whole Wheat Bread)	J. Smith; Taylor; O. Jackson; Bryan; W. Holmes; Abraham; Largen; Phillips	Lil Jon	3:45
8.	"Get In Get Out"	J. Smith; Cohn; Fisher; E. Jackson; D. Holmes; W. Holmes	Catalyst; Lil Jon; Detail (co.)	4:26
9.	"Pop Dat Pussy" (featuring Blazed)	J. Smith; Montay Humphrey; Korey Roberson; Howard Simmons; Essene Moorman	DJ Montay; Lil Jon	4:14
10.	"Outta Your Mind" (featuring LMFAO)	J. Smith; Skyler Gordy; Stefan Gordy	LMFAO; Lil Jon	4:10
11.	"Ride da D" (featuring Ying Yang Twins)	J. Smith; D. Holmes; E. Jackson	Lil Jon	3:50
12.	"Ms. Chocolate" (featuring R. Kelly and Mario)	J. Smith; Gholson; R. Kelly; C. Kelly; W. Holmes	Drumma Boy; Lil Jon	3:19
13.	"Like a Stripper" (featuring Pleasure P and Shawty Putt)	J. Smith; W. Holmes; Cooper; Waller; Buchanan; Chavis; Hardnett	Lil Jon	3:33
14.	"Moist" (featuring Oobie)	J. Smith; Love; Lamarquis Jefferson; W. Holmes; Kristal Oliver; Tenaia Sanders	Lil Jon	4:54
15.	"Every Freakin' Night" (featuring Naadei)	J. Smith; Naadei Lyonnais; Donald DeGrate, Jr.	Lil Jon	3:30
16.	"What a Night" (featuring Claude Kelly)	J. Smith; Steven Aoki; Justin Bates; C. Kelly; W. Holmes	Steve Aoki; Lil Jon	3:46
17.	"Shots" (LMFAO featuring Lil Jon)	J. Smith; Skyler Gordy; Stefan Gordy; Delatorre	LMFAO	3:38
18.	"Work It Out" (featuring Pitbull)	J. Smith; Pérez; Narain; Lenssen; Brunnings	DJ Chuckie; Dave Moreaux; Silvio Ecomo; Lil Jon	3:43
19.	"Machuka" (featuring Mr. Catra and Mulher Filé)	J Smith; Cassiano Juliano; Yani De Simone Pres Da Silva; Wagner Domingues Costa; W. Holmes	Kassiano; Lil Jon	3:10
20.	"Hey" (featuring 3OH!3)	Smith; Gottwald; Foreman; Motte; W. Holmes	Dr. Luke; 3OH!3 (co.); Lil Jon (co.)	3:35

Leftover tracks

- "I Do" (featuring Snoop Dogg and Swizz Beatz)
- "Act a Fool" (featuring Three 6 Mafia)
- "Give It All U Got" (featuring Kee)
- "Snap Yo Fingers" (featuring E-40 and Sean Paul of YoungBloodZ)

== Charts ==
Chart performance for Crunk Rock
Chart (2010)	Peak position
Canadian Albums (Nielsen SoundScan)	62
US Billboard 200	49
US Top R&B/Hip-Hop Albums (Billboard)	8
US Top Rap Albums (Billboard)	5
