= Bone Crusher (rapper) =

American rapper and producer (born 1971)

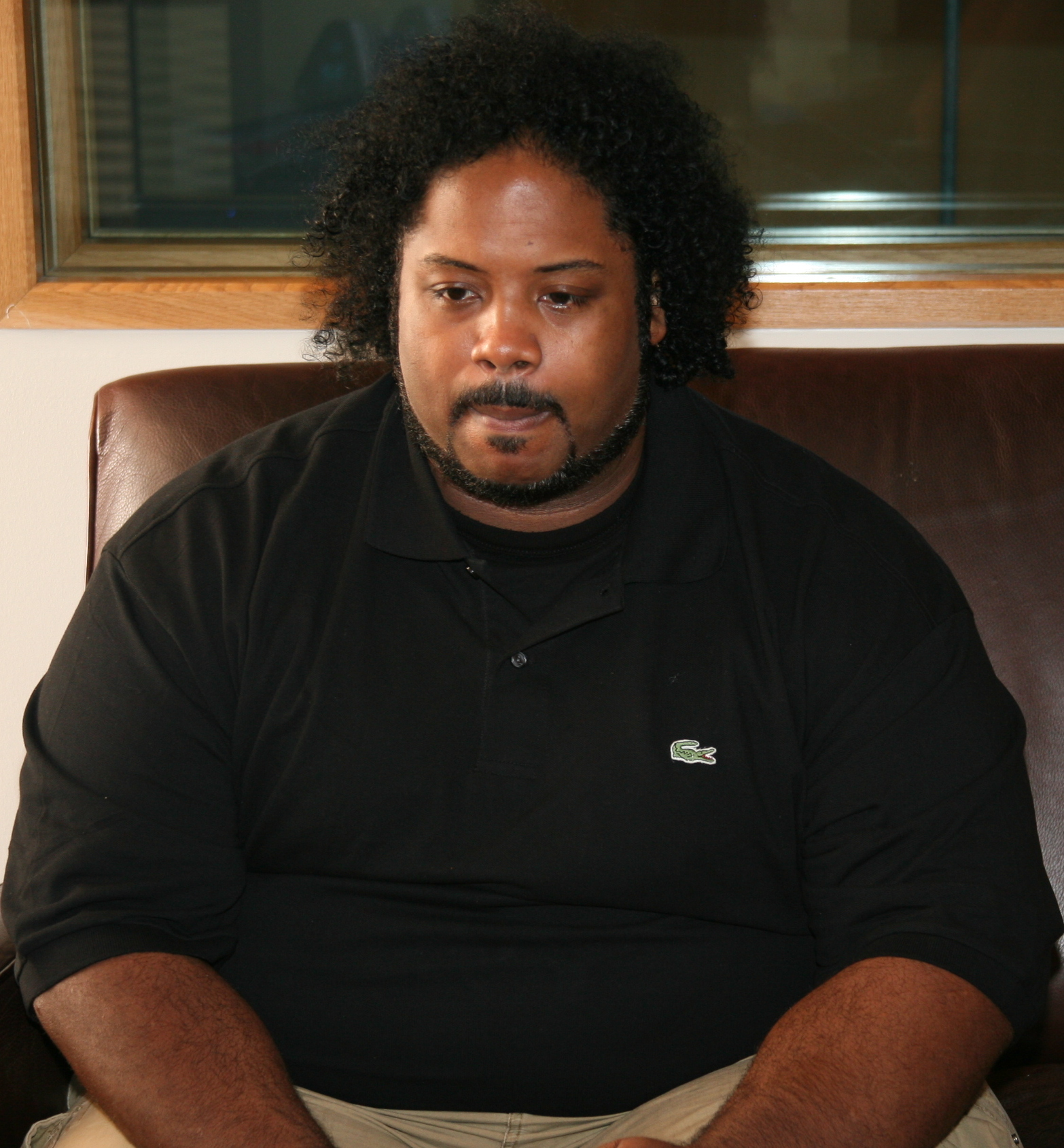
- Bone Crusher in 2007

Background information
- Born: Wayne Hardnett Jr. August 23, 1971 (age 55)
- Origin: Atlanta, Georgia, U.S.
- Genre: Southern hip-hop
- Occupation: Rapper
- Years active: 1996–present
- Labels: Arista; So So Def
- Member of: Body Head Bangerz

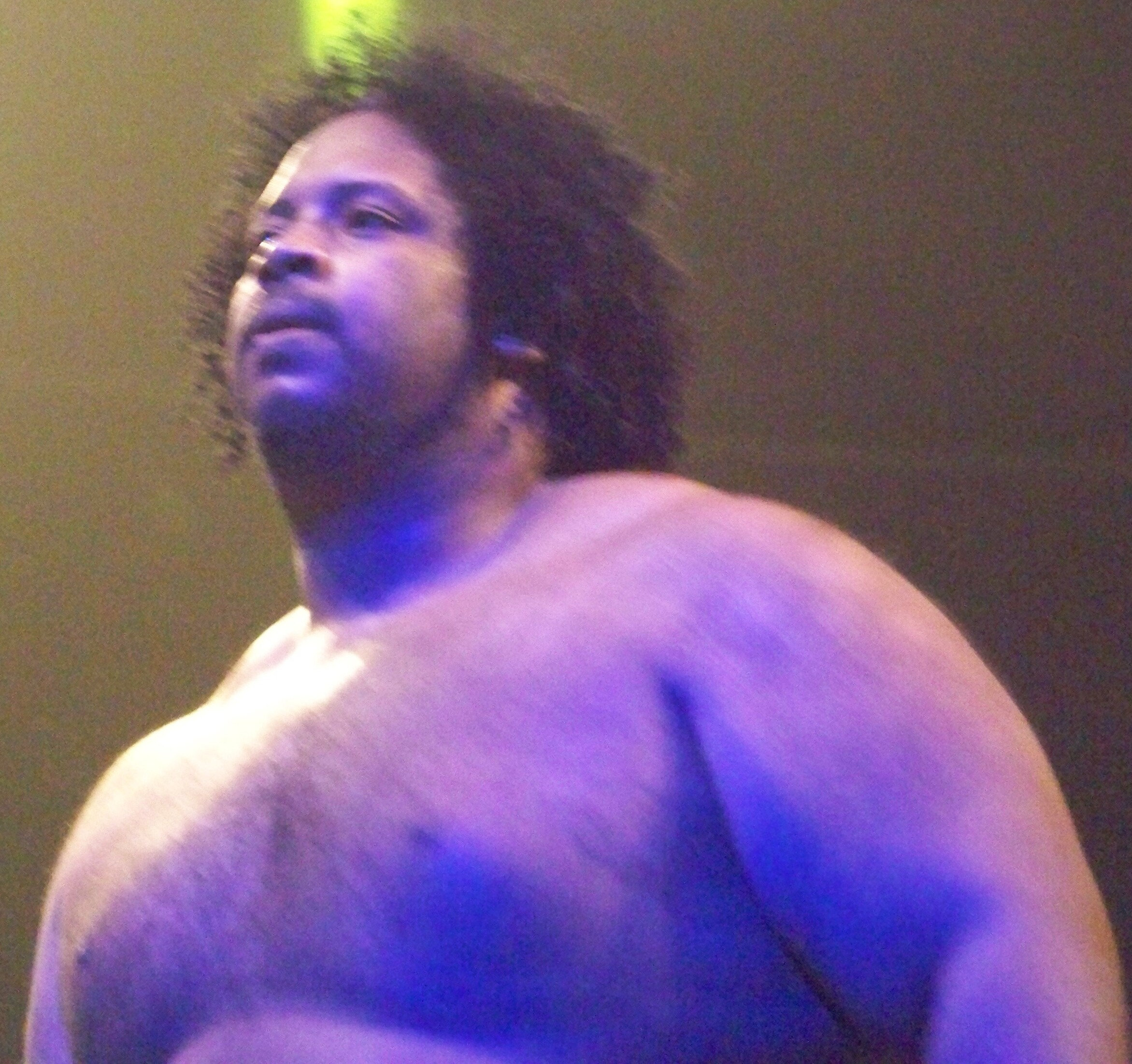
Bone Crusher performing in 2008

Wayne Hardnett Jr. (born August 23, 1971), known professionally as Bone Crusher, is an American rapper from Atlanta, Georgia. He was discovered by record producer Jermaine Dupri, and is best known for his 2003 crunk single, "Never Scared" (featuring Killer Mike and T.I.). The song peaked at number 26 on the Billboard Hot 100 — becoming his only entry on the chart — and preceded his debut studio album AttenCHUN! (2003). Additionally, the song served as theme music for that year's Atlanta Braves roster, and was featured in the Madden NFL 2004 video game, while the album peaked at number 11 on the Billboard 200.

Bone Crusher was featured on the cover of PlayStation Magazine in 2004, and was also a featured character on Def Jam: Fight for NY, by EA Games. He was featured on the third episode of the Sacha Baron Cohen satirical program Who Is America?.

== Discography ==
=== Studio albums ===
| Year | Album | Peak chart positions | |
| Year | Album | U.S. | U.S. R&B |
|---|---|---|---|
| 2003 | AttenCHUN!: Released: April 29, 2003; Label: So So Def / Arista | 11 | 1 |
| 2006 | Release the Beast: Released: July 18, 2006; Label: Body Head | – | 86 |
| 2007 | Free: Released: July 17, 2007; Label: Vainglorious | – | – |

=== Singles ===
| Year | Single | Chart positions | | | Album |
| Year | Single | U.S. Hot 100 | U.S. R&B | U.S. Rap | Album |
|---|---|---|---|---|---|
| 2003 | "Never Scared" (featuring Killer Mike and T.I.) | 26 | 8 | 6 | AttenCHUN! |
| 2005 | "Wyle Out" | | | | XXX State Of The Union soundtrack |
| 2011 | "Unstoppable" (featuring Mastamind and Rezza Bros.) | – | – | – | |

=== Mixtapes ===
- 2006: Bad to the Bone
- 2009: Planet Crusher

=== Guest appearances ===
- WAOR – All Of Me (also features Josh Mckay)
- Ying Yang Twins – Take Ya Clothes Off
- Young Jeezy – Take It To The Floor
- T-Pain – Goin Thru A Lot
- Killer Mike – Re-Akshon (also features T.I, Bun B)
- I-20 – Break Bread (prod. by Lil Jon) (also features Ludacris)
- Mariah Carey – The One (So So Def Remix)
- Kelis – Throw It Up
- Lil Skeeter – I Don't Like Dat
- Three Days Grace – Just Like Wylin (Worked on a single for xXx: State Of The Union)
- Celebrity Fit Club 4
- Fozzy (the song It's A Lie appears on Fozzy's "All That Remains" album)
- Tango Redd (Wobble & Shake It w/ David Banner)
- The Time Is Now – Sir Jinx's album General Population (feat. Ras Kass, Rodney O, Tri Star, & E Note)
- Theodore Unit – Who Are We
- Techniec – What You Say
- J Kwon – Tipsy (Remix) (also features Daz Dillinger, Youngbloodz, Da Brat and others)
- Field Mob – Deep Tonight
- Anthony B – Lighter (also features Wyclef Jean)
- Youngbloodz – Hot Heat (also features Backbone)
- Jim Crow – Flaw Boyz (also features Juvenile)
- Goodie Mob – Grindin
- A song for Xbox Live about Dead Rising
- Jennifer Lopez – Que Hiciste (Unofficial Remix)
- E-40 – Anybody Can Get It (also features Lil Jon & David Banner)
- Lisa Lopes – Bounce (featuring Chamillionaire and Bone Crusher)
- Baby D – It's Going Down (featuring Bone Crusher & Dru)
- Colt Ford – Gangsta of Love on Ride Through the Country
- Elephant Man – Pon de River
- $hamrock – F tha Game Up (also features S.J. Rose)
- Bizarre – Warning (also features Anamul house)
- Playable character on PlayStation/Xbox Video game "Def Jam Fight for New York"
- Unknown – Icey As I Wanna Be (Remix also features (Andre Lightskin) and Vander from Da Sag, Curt Cobaine)
- D Money – George Bush (Fiddle Faddle) (featuring Bone Crusher & Boondox)
- Wolff – Hate Me (Remix) (featuring Bloodshot & Bone Crusher)

== Video game appearances ==
Bone Crusher is a playable character in the video game Def Jam: Fight for NY.
