= Body Head Bangerz: Volume One =

Studio album by Body Head Bangerz
- Released: August 3, 2004 (Original release); October 26, 2004 (Re-release)
- Recorded: 2004
- Genre: Crunk; Southern hip hop; hardcore hip hop
- Label: Body Head Entertainment; Universal
- Producer: Roy Jones Jr. (exec.); Awood "Magic" Johnson (co-exec.)

Body Head Bangerz chronology
Body Head Bangerz: Volume One (2004)	Body Head Bangerz: The EP (2015)

Alternative cover
- Original artwork

Singles from Body Head Bangerz: Volume One
- 1. "I Smoke, I Drank" Released: July 2, 2004; 2. "Can't Be Touched" Released: November 16, 2004

Professional ratings
Review scores
Source	Rating
RapReviews	7/10 stars

Body Head Bangerz: Volume One is the debut studio album by American southern hip hop group Body Head Bangerz. The original version of the album released on August 3, 2004 under Body Head Entertainment, but was re-released on October 26, 2004 by Universal Music with a modified album cover, a re-ordered track list with two new songs, "Can't Let Go" and "Getting Money Right" but excluding the song "Down Here". The clean version of the re-release contains the same, though non-explicit, tracks as the original release. The album features many southern hip hop or "Dirty South" musicians such as B.G., Lil' Flip, Petey Pablo, Mike Jones and Bun B among others. The album produced two singles, "I Smoke, I Drank" and "Can't Be Touched". Both singles were featured on BET and one single appeared on the Billboard Hot 100 list. The song "Body Head Anthem" was featured on the in-game soundtrack for Midnight Club 3: DUB Edition.

== Track listing ==
Body Head Bangerz: Volume One

No.	Title	Writer(s)	Length
1.	"Intro"		1:40
2.	"Can't Be Touched" (Trouble Tha Truth)	Johnson, Awood; Harris, Tony; Jones, Roy Jr.	3:34
3.	"Don't Start It" (Juvenile)	Grey, Terius; Johnson, Awood; Jones, Roy Jr.	4:04
4.	"U Known My Kind." (B.G.)	Dorsey, Chris; Johnson, Awood; Jones, Roy Jr.	4:19
5.	"I Smoke, I Drank" (Lil' Boosie & Young Bleed)	Grigsby, Jeff; Johnson, Awood; Paul, Sean; Jones, Roy Jr.	5:59
6.	"I Smoke, I Drank (Remix)" (YoungBloodZ)	Grigsby, Jeff; Johnson, Awood; Paul, Sean; Jones, Roy Jr.	4:47
7.	"Keep It Moving" (Petey Pablo & Fiend)	Barrett, Moses; Johnson, Awood; Jones, Richard; Hunter, Jerome; Jones, Roy Jr.	3:52
8.	"You A Freak" (Swells)	Davis, Darnell; Johnson, Awood; Jones, Roy Jr.	4:06
9.	"Big Bodies"	Johnson, Awood; Hunter, Jerome; Jones, Roy Jr.	4:07
10.	"Ballers" (Lil' Flip)	Weston, Wesley; Hunter, Jerome; Jones, Roy Jr.	3:39
11.	"24's" (Bun B & Mike Jones)	Weston, Wesley; Hunter, Jerome; Jones, Roy Jr.	5:16
12.	"Can't Let Go" (Swells)	Hunter, Jerome; Johnson, Awood; Davis, Darnell	3:07
13.	"Body Head Anthem"	Johnson, Awood; Turner, Darwin; Jones, Roy Jr.	3:51
14.	"Yahoo"	Abrams, Terry; Fassett, Chris; Johnson, Awood	4:24
15.	"Getting Money Right" (Swells)		5:12
16.	"Go Hard, Go Home"	Fassett, Chris; Turner, Darwin; Davis, Darnell; Jones, Roy Jr.	5:24
17.	"Outro/We Run It" (Young Pappy)		5:07

Re-release track listing
No.	Title	Writer(s)	Length
1.	"Intro"		1:40
2.	"Can't Be Touched" (Trouble Tha Truth)	Johnson, Awood; Harris, Tony; Jones, Roy Jr.	3:34
3.	"Don't Start It" (Juvenile)	Grey, Terius; Johnson, Awood; Jones, Roy Jr.	4:04
4.	"I Smoke, I Drank (Remix)" (YoungBloodZ)	Grigsby, Jeff; Johnson, Awood; Paul, Sean; Jones, Roy Jr.	4:47
5.	"Keep It Moving" (Petey Pablo & Fiend)	Barrett, Moses; Johnson, Awood; Jones, Richard; Hunter, Jerome; Jones, Roy Jr.	3:52
6.	"You A Freak" (Swells)	Davis, Darnell; Johnson, Awood; Jones, Roy Jr.	4:06
7.	"Down Here" (D.W. Evans)		4:50
8.	"U Known My Kind." (B.G.)	Dorsey, Chris; Johnson, Awood; Jones, Roy Jr.	4:19
9.	"Big Bodies" (Perion)	Johnson, Awood; Hunter, Jerome; Jones, Roy Jr.	4:07
10.	"Ballers" (Lil' Flip & Perion)	Weston, Wesley; Hunter, Jerome; Jones, Roy Jr.	3:39
11.	"24's" (Bun B & Mike Jones)	Weston, Wesley; Hunter, Jerome; Jones, Roy Jr.	5:16
12.	"Body Head Anthem"	Johnson, Awood; Turner, Darwin; Jones, Roy Jr.	3:51
13.	"Go Hard, Go Home"	Fassett, Chris; Turner, Darwin; Davis, Darnell; Jones, Roy Jr.	5:24
14.	"Yahoo"	Abrams, Terry; Fassett, Chris; Johnson, Awood	4:24
15.	"I Smoke, I Drank" (Lil' Boosie & Young Bleed)	Grigsby, Jeff; Johnson, Awood; Paul, Sean; Jones, Roy Jr.	5:59
16.	"Outro" (Body Head Bangerz, Bass hard., Young Pappy)	Grigsby, Jeff; Johnson, Awood; Paul, Sean; Jones, Roy Jr.	0:46

== Chart positions ==
Charts (2004)	Peak position
Top Heatseekers	12
Top R&B/Hip-Hop Albums	38
