= On My Own (Magic album) =

Studio album by Magic
- Released: August 26, 2003
- Recorded: 2003
- Genre: Southern hip hop
- Label: Koch
- Producers: Magic (executive), DaBear, Mark in da Dark, MC Brainz, Anthony President, Sinista

Magic chronology
White Eyes (2003)	On My Own (2003)

Professional ratings
Review scores
Source	Rating
AllMusic	2.5/5 stars

On My Own is the fourth and final studio album by American rapper Magic, released on August 26, 2003 by Koch Records. The album features production from Magic, Mark in da Dark and Sinista as well as guest appearances by Curren$y.

Prior to the release of this album, Magic had just left No Limit Records to join Koch. This album was released just 5 months after his previous album White Eyes. This is Magic's final album prior to his death on March 1, 2013.

== Commercial performance ==
On My Own reached No. 54 on the Billboard Top R&B/Hip-Hop Albums chart.

== Track listing ==
1. "And It Starts" – 1:12 (feat. Mr B)
2. "Tear It Up" – 4:22
3. "Do What U Do" – 2:50
4. "Knock It Down" – 3:13
5. "Wilyn'" – 3:04
6. "Lala" – 0:29
7. "International Gangstas" – 3:09 (feat. Curren$y)
8. "Wild Wayne" – 0:35
9. "Ninth Ward" – 4:03
10. "DJ Ro" – 0:27
11. "We Give You" – 2:58 (feat. Trouble)
12. "So Tired" – 4:54 (feat. Trouble)
13. "Down Here" (Skit) – 0:33
14. "Down Here" – 3:34
15. "My Life" – 3:06
16. "Time to Go" – 3:23 (feat. Da Bear)
17. "Short & Simple" (Skit) – 0:54
18. "Short & Simple" – 3:26 (feat. Detroit)
19. "Ya'll Don't Really Want None" – 2:45
20. "Detroit" – 0:12
21. "All I Do" – 3:10

== Charts ==
Chart (2003)	Peak position
US Top R&B/Hip-Hop Albums	54
