= I Smoke, I Drank =

- Single cover of "I Smoke, I Drank (Remix)"

Single by Body Head Bangerz

from the album Body Head Bangerz: Volume One
- A-side: "I Smoke, I Drank"
- B-side: "I Smoke, I Drank (remix)"
- Released: July 2, 2004
- Recorded: 2004
- Genre: Hip hop
- Length: 5:59 (original); 4:47 (remix)
- Label: Body Head Entertainment; Universal Music Group
- Songwriter: Roy Jones Jr.
- Producers: Awood Johnson; Roy Jones Jr.; Sean Paul; Jeff Grigsby

Body Head Bangerz singles chronology
"I Smoke, I Drank" (2004)	"Can't Be Touched" (2004)

YoungBloodZ singles chronology
"Damn!" (2003)	"I Smoke, I Drank (Remix)" (2004)	"Presidential" (2005)

Audio sample
- I Smoke, I Drank (Remix): file; help

"I Smoke, I Drank", also known as "Do It Big", is the lead single from Body Head Bangerz's debut album, Body Head Bangerz: Volume One. The original track features Lil' Boosie and Young Bleed but only the remix of the song, "I Smoke, I Drank (Remix)" featuring YoungBloodZ, charted. Though only the latter charted, it is often credited as simply "I Smoke, I Drank". This single, along with Body Head Bangerz's second single, "Can't Be Touched" featuring Trouble Tha Truth, helped the group earn widespread recognition among hip hop enthusiasts.

== Music video ==
The music video for "I Smoke, I Drank (Remix)" was directed by Bernard Gourley, who also directed the music videos for M.I.A.'s "Paper Planes" and 50 Cent's "Follow My Lead". Two versions of the music video exist, one including and another excluding explicit material. The 'clean' version of the song is heavily censored, with explicit words either being muted or replaced with various sounds in a 'chopped & screwed' fashion. The non-explicit version of the video has also been edited in the same manner, with alternating frame sizes and frequent but very brief time-lapses. This technique is popular among Dirty South artists such as Mike Jones and Bun B, two artists who are featured on the album. The Producer of this song was incorrectly identified; the actual producer of this song is Ronna'Griffin Jr. AKA Beat Doctor from New Orleans Louisiana, Beat Doctor had worked with Mr. Magic on this song and countless other songs until the time of Mr. Magic passing. The Producer information have been correctly updated by BMI.

The music video premiered on BET and shows members of the Body Head Bangerz and YoungBloodZ attending an AA meeting at the 'Phoenix Center for Addiction'. Among the rappers present at the meeting are Roy Jones Jr., Magic and YoungBloodZ. Choppa is also present though he does not perform vocally on the track. Several scenes for the music video were shot at Roy Jones Jr.'s Florida mansion, with one particular scene depicting Magic falling backwards into a pool which is also seen in Roy Jones Jr.'s "Y'all Must've Forgot" music video.

== Single track list ==
=== A-side ===
1. "I Smoke, I Drank (Radio Edit)" (5:59)
2. "I Smoke, I Drank (Album Version)" (5:59)
3. "I Smoke, I Drank (Instrumental)" (5:59)

=== B-side ===
1. "I Smoke, I Drank (Remix) (Radio Edit)" (4:47)
2. "I Smoke, I Drank (Remix) (Album Version)" (4:47)
3. "I Smoke, I Drank (Remix) (Instrumental)" (4:47)

== Chart performance ==
The song debuted on the Billboard Bubbling Under Hot 100 Singles chart. After several weeks on the chart, the single appeared on the Billboard Hot 100 chart and peaked at just over 80th place. It performed considerably better on the Billboard Hot R&B/Hip-Hop Songs and Hot Rap Tracks charts.

== Charts ==
Chart	Peak position
US Billboard Hot 100	81
US Hot R&B/Hip-Hop Songs (Billboard)	30
US Hot Rap Songs (Billboard)	25

== Release history ==
Region	Date	Format(s)	Label(s)	Ref.
United States	September 14, 2004	Rhythmic contemporary · urban contemporary radio	Universal	
