= White Eyes (album) =

Studio album by Magic
- Released: March 18, 2003
- Recorded: 2002–2003
- Studio: Ghetto Bill's Place; Lil Jon's Studio; The Tracken Place (Hollywood, CA); The Village Studios (Los Angeles, CA); Piety Street Recording (New Orleans, LA); Dauphine Studios
- Genre: Southern hip hop; gangsta rap
- Length: 1:00:01
- Label: The New No Limit; Universal
- Producer: Da Beatboyz; Full Pack Music; Ham; Lil' Jon; Presidential Campaign

Magic chronology
Thuggin' (1999)	White Eyes (2003)	On My Own (2003)

Singles from White Eyes
- 1. "What" Released: July 16, 2002

Professional ratings
Review scores
Source	Rating
AllMusic	3/5 stars
The Michigan Daily	2/5 stars

White Eyes is the third solo studio album by American rapper Magic. It was released on March 18, 2003 through The New No Limit/Universal Records, marking his final album for the label. Recording sessions took place at Ghetto Bill's Place, Lil Jon's Studio, The Tracken Place in Hollywood, The Village Studios in Los Angeles, Piety Street Recording in New Orleans, and Dauphine Studios. Production was handled by Da Beat Boyz, Full Pack Music, Ham, Lil' Jon and Presidential Campaign, with Master P serving as executive producer. The album debuted at number 147 on the Billboard 200 and number 37 on the Top R&B/Hip-Hop Albums charts in the United States.

== Track listing ==
No.	Title	Producer(s)	Length
1.	"Intro"	Da Beat Boyz	0:55
2.	"War"	Lil' Jon	4:32
3.	"Hustler"	Ham	4:32
4.	"What U Gonna Do"	Ham	4:15
5.	"Creepers"	Da Beat Boyz	3:22
6.	"I'll Be There"	Da Beat Boyz	2:56
7.	"What Up Then"	Da Beat Boyz	3:26
8.	"Shake a Little Something"	Full Pack Music	4:20
9.	"Fire"	Da Beat Boyz	2:44
10.	"Good Life"	Presidential Campaign	3:23
11.	"What"	Presidential Campaign	3:02
12.	"With You"	Da Beat Boyz	3:12
13.	"Friday"	Da Beat Boyz	4:07
14.	"Ball Like Us"	Da Beat Boyz	3:14
15.	"Never Slippin'"	Presidential Campaign	2:58
16.	"Smoke On"	Presidential Campaign	3:54
17.	"Forgive Us"	Presidential Campaign	4:23
18.	"Outro"	Presidential Campaign	0:46
Total length:			1:00:01

Sample credits

- Track 11 contains replayed elements from "One Way or Another" written by Debbie Harry and Nigel Harrison.
- Track 17 contains replayed elements from "For the Love of You" written by Kenneth Gamble, Leon Huff and Anthony Jackson.

== Charts ==
Chart (2003)	Peak position
US Billboard 200	147
US Top R&B/Hip-Hop Albums (Billboard)	37
