= Melanie Spitta =

Sinti and German film-maker (1946–2005)

- Born: 1946; Hasselt, Belgium
- Died: August 28, 2005 (aged 58–59); Frankfurt, Germany
- Occupation: Film-maker
- Known for: Documenting the Nazi genocide of the Sinti and Roma

Melanie Spitta (1946 – 28 August 2005; sometimes recorded as Melanie Splita) was a German Sinti film-maker.

She was born in 1946 in Hasselt, Belgium, in a Sinti family, and died on 28 August 2005 in Frankfurt, Germany. Her family had moved from Germany in 1938 in an attempt to escape persecution by the Nazis, but her six siblings died in Auschwitz concentration camp, where her mother was also imprisoned but survived, with damaged health. The family later moved to Düren in North Rhine-Westphalia, Germany.

In her film-making and other activism she worked to reveal the Nazi genocide of the Sinti and other Romani people. In 1999 she was awarded the Otto Pankok Prize, inaugurated by Günter Grass in memory of his teacher Otto Pankok.

Her film Das Falsche Wort is in the permanent collection of the United States Holocaust Memorial Museum, and her work was included in the online World Roma Congress Art Exhibition in 2021. Her 1981 film, Es ging Tag und Nacht, liebes Kind (It went day and night, dear child), made with Katrin Seybold, covered the night of 2-3 August 1944 when the last Sinti and Roma prisoners in Auschwitz-Birkenau were killed in the gas chambers. Spitta and Seybold also made the 1981 film We are Sinti Children and Not Gypsies, which is available on Mubi.

== Filmography ==
- Schimpft uns nicht Zigeuner (1980, Don't scold us as gypsies)
- Wir sind Sintikinder und keine Zigeuner (1981, We are Sinti children and not gypsies)
- Es ging Tag und Nacht liebes Kind (1982, It went day and night, dear child)
- Das Falsche Wort (1987, The wrong word)
- Meleza und Gallier (1996, Meleza and Gallier)
