= 504 Boyz =

American hip-hop group

- Origin: New Orleans, Louisiana, U.S.
- Genre: Hip hop
- Years active: 1997–2005
- Labels: No Limit; New No Limit; Gutta
- Past members: C-Murder; Choppa; Currensy; Krazy; Mac; Magic (deceased); Master P Mystikal; Silkk the Shocker; T-Bo

504 Boyz were an American hip hop group from New Orleans, Louisiana, named for the New Orleans area code.

The original 504 Boyz, Master P (as "Nino Brown"), Mystikal (as "G. Money"), Silkk the Shocker (as "Vito"), C-Murder, and Krazy, released their first album, Goodfellas, in 2000. It included the hit single "Wobble Wobble", a "bounce-flavored song" which peaked at #17 in the U.S.

In 2002, new members were introduced as part of the New No Limit rebrand. Choppa, Currensy, Afficial, and T-Bo were on the 2002 album Ballers, which produced a minor hit single Tight Whips. C-Murder was arrested for murdering a fan in 2001.

After Hurricane Katrina hit New Orleans in 2005, 504 Boyz released a benefit compilation We Gon Bounce Back, their third and final album.

== Discography ==
=== Studio albums ===
List of studio albums, with selected chart positions
Title	Album details	Peak chart positions		Certifications
Title	Album details	US	US R&B	Certifications
Goodfellas	Released: May 2, 2000; Label: No Limit / Priority; Format: CD, cassette, digital download	2	1	RIAA: Gold
Ballers	Released: December 10, 2002; Label: New No Limit / Universal; Format: CD, cassette, digital download	49	13	
Hurricane Katrina: We Gon Bounce Back	Released: November 8, 2005; Label: Guttar; Format: CD, digital download	—	—	

=== Singles ===
List of singles as lead artist
Title	Year	Peak chart positions			Album
Title	Year	US	US R&B	US Rap	Album
"Wobble Wobble"	2000	17	2	1	Goodfellas
"Tight Whips"	2002	—	51	—	Ballers
