= Hanover University of Applied Sciences and Arts =

University of Applied Sciences in Lower Saxony

Coordinates: 52°21′13″N 9°43′27″E

Hochschule Hannover - University of Applied Sciences and Arts
- Location: Hanover, Germany

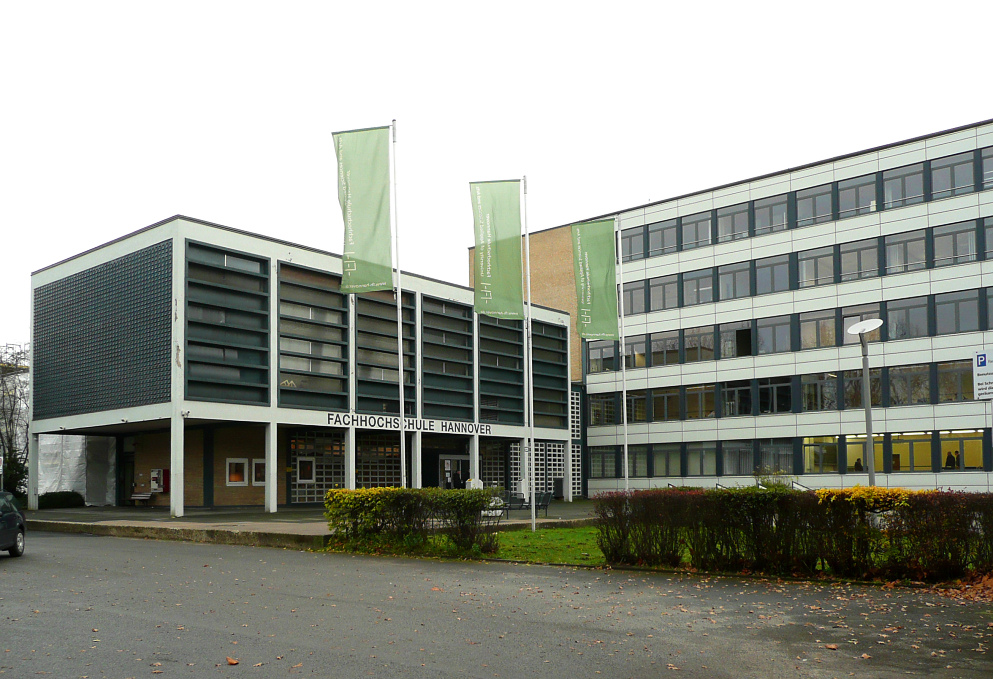
Entrance of the main building, 2010

The Hochschule Hannover - University of Applied Sciences and Arts (HsH) is a public Fachhochschule (University of Applied Sciences and Arts) in Hanover. It's the second largest university in Hanover with approximately 10,000 enrolled students in the winter term 2021/2022 and 620 professors and employees. In addition there are around 430 guestlecturers from other academic institutes, organisations and companies teaching at the HsH. The Hochschule Hannover has four locations (main campus Ricklinger Stadtweg in Hannover-Linden, EXPO-Plaza in Hannover-Mittelfeld, Blumhardtstraße in Hannover-Kleefeld and Heisterbergallee in Hannover-Ahlem).

== History ==
In 1971 the Fachhochschule Hannover was founded as successor of several educational institutions, amongst others the "Freye Handwerksschule für Lehrlinge" and the "Königlich Hannoversche Baugewerkschule zu Nienburg/Weser". In 2007 the Evangelische Fachhochschule Hannover (Evangelical University of Applied Sciences) was incorporated as a fifth faculty.

Since 2010 the name of the university was changed to Hochschule Hannover. In 2010 the degree program "Fotojournalismus und Dokumentarfotografie" with the English name "Photojournalism and Documentary Photography" was accredited by the organization ACQUIN. The HsH belongs with this core profile to the major international photographic educational institutes. The current president of the Hochschule Hannover is Josef von Helden.

== Cooperations ==
The HsH cooperates with diverse institutions such as Aalborg University, the Hogeschool Gent, and a wide range of partners in industry.

== List of Faculties ==
- Faculty I – Electrical Engineering and Information Technology (Hannover-Linden campus)
- Faculty II – Mechanical and Bio Process Engineering (Hannover-Linden and Hannover-Ahlem campuses)
- Faculty III – Media, Information and Design (Hannover-Mittelfeld campus)
- Faculty IV – Business and Computer Science (Hannover-Linden campus)
- Faculty V – Social Welfare Work and Health Care (Hannover-Kleefeld campus)
