= Body Head Bangerz =

American hip hop group

- Origin: Pensacola, Florida, U.S.
- Genres: Hip hop
- Years active: 2004 – Present
- Label: Body Head Bangers Music
- Members: Roy Jones Jr. Choppa; SM Bullett; Snappa; Ms.Kandi; Bone Crusher
- Past members: Magic (deceased)

Body Head Bangerz is a hip hop group based in Pensacola, Florida and formed by former heavyweight boxing champion Roy Jones Jr. Originally consisting of Jones, Magic, Choppa, Snappa, and Bone Crusher the current roster includes Jones, SM Bullet and Ms.Kandi.

The group's 2004 debut album, Body Head Bangerz: Volume One, was released under Jones' Body Head Entertainment imprint and featured cameos by YoungBloodZ, Juvenile, Lil' Flip, Bun B and Petey Pablo.

On March 1, 2013, Magic and his wife were killed in a traffic collision in Mississippi, with his daughter the lone survivor.

The group's first material in over a decade, Body Head Bangerz: The EP, was released August 21, 2015 under Jones' new label Body Head Bangerz Music and featured the non-charting single "Can't Lose".

== Discography ==
=== Studio albums ===
- Body Head Bangerz: Volume One (2004)
- Body Head Bangerz: The EP (2015)

=== Singles ===
Year	Song	U.S. Hot 100	U.S. R&B	U.S. Rap	Album
2004	"I Smoke, I Drank"	81	30	25	Body Head Bangerz: Volume One
2005	"Can't Be Touched"	-	-	-	Body Head Bangerz: Volume One
2015	"Can't Lose"	-	-	-	Body Head Bangerz: The EP
