= Mac (rapper) =

American rapper

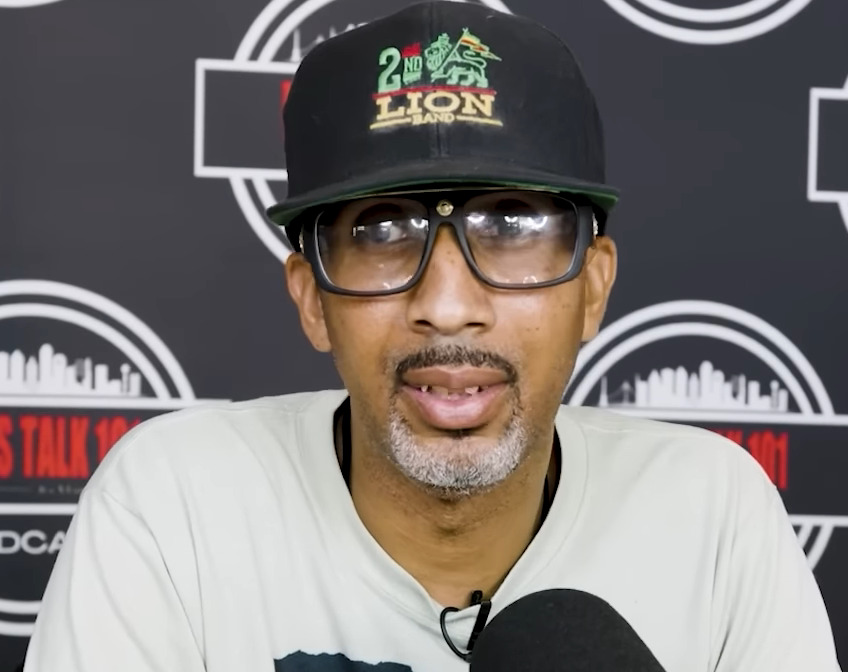
- Mac in 2025

Background information
- Also known as: The Camouflage Assassin; Lil Mac
- Born: McKinley Phipps Jr. July 30, 1977 (age 49); Third Ward, New Orleans, Louisiana, U.S.
- Genre: Hip-hop
- Occupation: Rapper
- Years active: 1989–present
- Labels: No Limit; Priority

McKinley Phipps, Jr. (born July 30, 1977), better known simply as Mac, is an American rapper from New Orleans' 3rd Ward. He began rapping as a child, releasing his debut album The Lyrical Midget at the age of 13 in 1990, under the stage name Lil Mac. Mac would eventually sign with Master P's No Limit Records and would grow to be one of the most critically acclaimed artists on the label, both as a solo rapper and as a member of the super group 504 Boyz. Mac released two solo albums and one album as part of the 504 Boyz on No Limit, including 1998's Shell Shocked, which peaked at No. 11 on the US Billboard 200.

In 2001, Mac was convicted of manslaughter and sentenced to 30 years in prison at the Elayn Hunt Correctional Center in Louisiana, and was released on parole on June 22, 2021, after serving 20 years of his sentence. Phipps maintained his innocence throughout, and his parents have campaigned to re-open the investigation into his case.

== Career ==
Mac was born McKinley Phipps, Jr. to Sheila Phipps and McKinley Phipps, Sr. in New Orleans, the oldest of their six children. He began his music career in 1990, and by the time he was 13 years old, under the name "Lil Mac", he released his debut album, The Lyrical Midget. The album was one of the earliest commercial hip-hop albums to come out of New Orleans, and featured production from New Orleans producer Mannie Fresh.

=== Late 1990s: No Limit Records, Shell Shocked, and World War III ===
Lil Mac joined the Psychoward, a New Orleans–based group consisting of 28 rappers, and the group released their debut album, www.psychoward.com, in 1997. After rejecting an offer to move to New York and sign with Def Jam Recordings, Lil Mac changed his name to simply Mac and signed with Master P's No Limit Records. He toured with No Limit throughout the U.S. and Europe, and made guest appearances on many other artists' albums before releasing his own. He was featured on Master P's Ghetto D, Mia X's Unlady Like, and Fiend's There's One In Every Family, among others. The next year in 1998, Mac released his second solo album and first with No Limit, Shell Shocked. The album is Mac's most commercially successful to date, reaching #11 on the Billboard 200. Mac again was featured on many other No Limit artist's releases that year. In 1999, he released his second album on the label, World War III. While it was still on the label, this release differed from usual No Limit releases in that it was not exclusively produced by the production team Beats by the Pound, and featured only three guest appearances from major No Limit names Master P, C-Murder, and Silkk the Shocker. The album did not fare as well commercially as his first No Limit release, peaking at No. 44 on the Billboard 200. Mac's musical style differed from many other Southern hip-hop artists in this period, and he often displayed a level of lyrical complexity that has come to be associated with East Coast hip-hop.

=== 504 Boyz and later releases ===
World War III would be Mac's last album released on No Limit and his last solo album to date. In 2000, he joined the group 504 Boyz, whose name was a reference to the area code 504. The group was a collective of other No Limit rappers such as Master P, C-Murder, and Silkk the Shocker. Mac was with the group for one album, 2000's Goodfellas, which went gold and reached No. 2 on the Billboard 200. He was featured prominently on the group's hit single "Wobble Wobble", rapping the first verse and the chorus. The song reached No. 17 on the Billboard Hot 100 Phipps would be sentenced to a 30-year prison term for manslaughter after 19-year-old Barron C. Victor, Jr. died from a gunshot wound in a Louisiana nightclub in 2001.

In 2007, while Mac was still serving his prison term, No Limit released the album The Lost Tapes, which consisted of unreleased material Mac recorded with the label.

On May 31, 2012, DJ 5150 released the mixtape Uptown Veterans, a compilation of Mac's greatest hits. Mac Phipps has announced his first album in 23 years, Son of the City, which comes just over a year after being released from prison after two decades behind bars. Son of the City was released on October 31, 2022, with features from Fiend, D1, Curren$y,3d Na'tee, Cognac, Rayvon Neal, and many more.

== Legal issues ==
On February 21, 2000, Phipps was scheduled to perform at Slidell, Louisiana nightclub Club Mercedes, but a fight broke out before the show that resulted in a gunshot that struck and killed 19-year-old Barron C Victor, Jr. after Victor attempted to break up the fight. Phipps was arrested and charged with second-degree murder of Victor. He was convicted of manslaughter and sentenced to thirty years in prison on September 21, 2001. He would serve his sentence at the Elayn Hunt Correctional Center in Louisiana. Days into the police investigation, Thomas Williams, a man who was working security that night at the club, confessed to shooting Victor after another patron charged him with a beer bottle. Despite this, police pursued charges against Phipps.

In December 2014, Northwestern University's Medill Justice Project (MJP), in partnership with The Lens, published the results of a three-month investigation of Phipps' conviction, revealing that a key eyewitness at his trial gave his private investigator an affidavit in 2013 that stated she was coerced into identifying Phipps as the shooter because of investigators' threats to charge her. Following Medill's investigation, David Lohr of The Huffington Post published the results of a four-month review of Phipps' conviction, further revealing that four other witnesses to the shooting told the publication that they also were threatened, intimidated or outright ignored by investigators. Phipps' family has since obtained affidavits from many of the individuals in an effort to get him a new trial.

On March 25, 2015, rapper Killer Mike told students at Dillard University in New Orleans that it was unacceptable for authorities to use rap lyrics in the prosecution of Phipps: "If we let this stand, what you're going to see is that tool is going to be used to wipe out an entire potential generation of [artists] out of our community."

Phipps has applied for the Louisiana governor’s clemency in 2016, asking to be released from prison for time served. In the petition sent to the Louisiana Board of Pardons and Parole he seeks a commutation due to a "wrongful conviction and excessive sentence", as "evidence developed over the last two years" which includes, among other things, findings from MJP's investigation.

On February 22, 2021, the Louisiana Board of Pardons and Parole voted for Phipps' immediate eligibility for parole. On April 8, 2021, Louisiana governor John Bel Edwards granted Phipps clemency. According to Louisiana law, Phipps has one more hearing before he is released.

On June 22, 2021, Phipps was released from prison after serving twenty years.

== Discography ==
=== Studio albums ===
List of studio albums, with selected chart positions, sales figures and certifications
Title	Release	Peak chart positions		Sales
Title	Release	US	US R&B/HH	Sales
The Lyrical Midget (as Lil Mac)	Released: 1990; Label: Yo! Records; Formats: CD, LP, CS, digital download	—	—	
Shell Shocked	Released: July 21, 1998; Label: No Limt, Priority; Formats: CD, LP, CS, digital download	11	4	US:430,000
World War III	Released: September 28, 1999; Label: No Limt, Priority; Formats: CD, LP, CS, digital download	44	6	US:155,000
Son of the City	Released: October 31, 2022; Label: Miko Media; Formats: Digital Download	—	—	

=== Collaboration albums ===
- Goodfellas with 504 Boyz (2000)

=== Compilation albums ===
- Lost Tapes (2007)

=== Mixtapes ===
- Uptown Veterans (2012)

=== Singles ===
Year	Song	Album
1990	"I Need Wheels"	The Lyrical Midget
1996	"Mad or Jealous" (featuring Storm)	Non-album single
1998	"Boss Chick" (featuring Mia X)	Shell Shocked
1999	"War Party" (featuring Magic & D.I.G.)	World War III
2000	"If It's Cool" (featuring Ms. Peaches)	World War III
2022	"No Fear" (featuring Dee-1)	Son of The City
