= Krazy (rapper) =

American rapper

- Also known as: Crazy
- Born: Michael Wilson; August 20, 1976 (age 49)
- Origin: New Orleans, Louisiana, U.S.
- Genres: Hip hop
- Occupation: Rapper
- Years active: 1994–present
- Labels: Ruff Era Records (formerly), Hard Head (formerly), No Limit, Breather Entertainment, No Limit Forever

Michael Wilson, known professionally as Krazy, is an American rapper. He formally started his music career in a rap group called, Murder Inc. Krazy later signed to No Limit Records and joined 504 Boyz in 2000.

== Career ==
=== 1994–1997: Early career ===
Crazy formally started his music career in 1994 when he signed to independent New Orleans record label, Hard Head Records, and became a member of the rap group, Murder Inc. with artists Legend Man, MC L, and Alamo. Their debut album entitled; "Playin' For Keeps" was released on September 25, 1995. They would release a second and final album, entitled; "Let's Die Together" in 1997 named in tribute to the passing of their CEO/founder of Hard Head Records, Roderick Smith who was shot and killed in May 1996. Crazy and Legend Man signed to a second independent record label, Ruff Era Records in 1996–1997. Legend Man signed in 1996, and Crazy followed in 1997, along with MC L signing to Bally Boy Records and Alamo deciding to end her rap career.

=== 1998–1999: Solo career ===
Crazy started his solo career in 1997 when he signed to New Orleans record label, Ruff Era Records. His debut 'solo' album, entitled; "I Shed Tears For The World" was released on July 21, 1998, and would be declared one of the "Best of the Best Top 204 Independent Rap Albums" by Murder Dog Magazine. On August 10, 1999, he released his second studio album, entitled; "Please Don't Kill Me" titled in reference to the controversial subject of abortion.

=== 2000–2004: No Limit, 504 Boyz, etc. ===
He joined Master P's newly formed rap group the 504 Boyz in 2000, appearing as 'Krazy'. His third studio album "Breather Life" was released in 2001 by a No Limit Records subsidiary label Soulja Army Records. It reached No. 91 on the Top R&B/Hip-Hop Albums and No. 31 on the Top Independent Albums charts.

He released his fourth and final studio album "Us Killing Us" in 2004 on his own label, Breather Entertainment.

== Discography ==
=== Studio albums ===
List of studio albums, with selected chart positions and certifications
Title	Album details	Peak chart positions	
Title	Album details	US	US R&B
I Shed Tears For The World (as Crazy)	Released: July 21, 1998 (US); Label: Ruff Era Records; Format: CD, Cassette	—	—
Please Don't Kill Me (as Crazy)	Released: August 10, 1999 (US); Label: Ruff Era Records; Format: CD, Cassette	—	—
Breather Life	Released: August 7, 2001 (US); Label: No Limit, Soulja Army Records, Southwest; Format: CD, Cassette	—	91
Us Killin' Us (as Crazy)	Released: July 6, 2004; Label: Breather Entertainment; Format: CD	—	—

=== Collaboration albums ===
List of collaboration albums, with selected chart positions
Title	Album details	Peak chart positions	
Title	Album details	US	US R&B
Playin' For Keeps (by Murder Inc.)	Released: September 25, 1995; Label: Hard Head Records; Format: CD, Cassette, LP	—	—
Let's Die Together (by Murder Inc.)	Released: 1997; Label: Hard Head Records; Format: CD, Cassette	—	—

=== As featured artist ===
List of singles as featured artist, with selected chart positions, showing year released and album name
Title	Year	Peak chart positions			Album
Title	Year	US	US R&B	US Rap	Album
"Wobble Wobble" (504 Boyz)	2000	17	2	1	Goodfellas
"Get Cha Mind Right" (Soulja Slim featuring Krazy & X-Conn)	2001	—	—	—	The Streets Made Me
"Rock It" (Master P featuring Weebie & Krazy)	2002	—	72	—	Game Face
