= Magic (rapper) =

American rapper

Background information
- Born: Awood Johnson Jr. August 16, 1975; Downtown New Orleans, Louisiana, U.S.
- Died: March 1, 2013 (aged 37) Hattiesburg, Mississippi, U.S.
- Genre: Hip hop
- Occupation: Rapper
- Years active: 1996–2013
- Labels: No Limit; BANX ENT; Priority; Universal

Awood Johnson Jr. (August 16, 1975 – March 1, 2013), better known by his stage name Magic (or Mr. Magic), was an American rapper from Downtown New Orleans, best known for his stint with No Limit Records in the late 1990s and early 2000s.

== Early life ==
Born and raised in the Lower Ninth Ward of Downtown New Orleans, Louisiana, Awood Johnson first made his name in New Orleans' underground circuit performing in talent shows and in a local group. Magic first appeared on C-Murder's songs "Picture Me" and "Watch Yo Enemies" on his 1998 album Life or Death. He was signed to C-Murder's label Tru Records, a sublabel to No Limit Records.

== Career ==
Magic's released his debut solo studio album, Sky's the Limit, in 1998, which reached #15 on the Billboard 200. In 1999, Magic released his second solo studio album Thuggin' which featured hit singles "That's Me" and "Ice on my Wrist" with Master P, which had minor success, peaking at #30. Following poor sales of his third studio album, White Eyes (#147), in 2003, along with the departure of many of No Limit's marquee artists and the label's overall decline, Magic severed his relationship with No Limit. He released his fourth and final solo album, the non-charting On My Own, on Koch Records, just five months after his split from No Limit.

Magic joined fellow New Orleans native Choppa and former boxing champion Roy Jones Jr. to form the group Body Head Bangerz, which released its only album in 2004, Body Head Bangerz: Volume One, and had a minor hit with "I Smoke, I Drank".

Magic then secured a deal with TVT Records in 2006, but left without ever releasing any material. He formed his own label, Banx Entertainment, in 2011.

== Death ==
On March 1, 2013, Johnson and his wife Chastity were killed in a traffic collision in Hattiesburg, Mississippi. Their 12-year-old daughter was the lone survivor.

== Discography ==
=== Studio albums ===
- Sky's the Limit (1998)
- Thuggin' (1999)
- White Eyes (2003)
- On My Own (2003)

=== Collaboration albums ===
- Body Head Bangerz: Volume One with Body Head Bangerz (2004)
