= Mannie Fresh production discography =

The following list is a discography of production by American hip hop record producer and recording artist Mannie Fresh. It includes a list of songs produced, co-produced and remixed by year, album, artist and title.

== Billboard singles produced ==
The following are singles produced by Mannie Fresh which appeared on at least one of the Billboard charts. They have their peak position in bold:

- 1998: "Ha" - Juvenile **#68 US**
- 1999: "Back That Azz Up" - Juvenile **#19 US**
- 1999: "Bling Bling" - B.G. **#36 US**
- 1999: "Tha Block Is Hot" - Lil Wayne **#65 US**
- 1999: "I Need a Hot Girl" - Hot Boys **#65 US**
- 2000: "U Understand" - Juvenile **#89 US**
- 2000: "Get Your Roll On" - Big Tymers **#101 US**
- 2000: "Number One Stunna" - Big Tymers **#105 US**
- 2000: "Project Chick" - Cash Money Millionaires **#47 US**
- 2001: "Set It Off" - Juvenile **#65 US**
- 2001: "Mamma Got Ass" - Juvenile **#65 US**
- 2001: "Shine" - Lil Wayne **#96 US**
- 2002: "Still Fly" - Big Tymers **#11 US**
- 2002: "Oh Yeah!" - Big Tymers **#46 US**
- 2002: "Way of Life" - Lil Wayne **#71 US**
- 2003: "This Is How We Do" - Big Tymers **#97 US**
- 2003: "In My Life" - Juvenile **#46 US**
- 2004: "Go D.J." - Lil Wayne **#14 US**
- 2004: "Real Big" - Mannie Fresh **#79 US**
- 2005: "And Then What" - Young Jeezy **#67 US**
- 2006: "Top Back" - T.I. **#29 US**
- 2007: "Big Shit Poppin' (Do It)" - T.I. **#9 US**
- 2009: "Take Your Shirt Off" - T-Pain **#80 US**
- 2018: "Start This Shit Off Right" - Lil Wayne **#76 US**
- 2018: "Perfect Strangers" - Lil Wayne **#86 US**
- 2020: "Mahogany" - Lil Wayne **#61 US**

== 1987 ==
=== DJ Mannie Fresh & MC Gregory D - Throw Down ===
A-Side

- 01. "Freddie's Back"
- 02. "Monster Booogie"
- 03. "Rock Rap"
- 04. "Bust Down (Ya'll)"

B-Side

- 01. "Throw Down"
- 02. "One Monday Morning"
- 03. "Never 4-Get Were I Come From"
- 04. "Club Style"
- 05. "Women Ain't Stupid"

== 1989 ==
=== DJ Mannie Fresh & MC Gregory D - D Rules the Nation ===
- 01. "Clap To This"
- 02. "This Is How We Do It"
- 03. "Call Somebody Else"
- 04. "Cindy"
- 05. "We Want The Funk"
- 06. "Buck Jump Time"
- 07. "Never Trust A Man"
- 08. "D Rules The Nation"
- 09. "Uzi Automatic"
- 10. "Sneak 'Em"
- 11. "Hitman"
- 12. "V.D. Woman"
- 13. "Perfect 10"

== 1990 ==
=== Lil Mac - The Lyrical Midget ===
- 01. "I Need Wheels"
- 04. "Cleo"
- 12. "Lil Mac Be Clubbin'"

== 1992 ==
=== DJ Mannie Fresh & MC Gregory D - The Real Deal or No Deal ===
- 01. "10 Years"
- 02. "Crack Slangas"
- 03. "Down W/HIV"
- 04. "Gangsta Life"
- 05. "Dogg Ass Nigga"
- 06. "Make The Beat Funky"
- 07. "Sica Dis Stupid Shit"
- 08. "Coochie Pleasers"
- 09. "Hi-School Hoodlums"
- 10. "Rollin' That"

== 1993 ==
=== U.N.L.V. - 6th & Barronne ===
- All Tracks

=== B-32 "I Need A Bag Of Dope" ===
- All Tracks

=== Lil Slim The Game is Cold ===
- All Tracks

=== PxMxWx - Legalize "Pass the Weed" ===
- All Tracks

=== Ms. Tee - Chillin' on tha Corner ===
- All Tracks

=== Pimp Daddy - Still Pimpin' ===
- All Tracks

== 1994 ==
=== Mr. Ivan - 187 in a Hockey Mask ===
- All Tracks

=== PxMxWx - High Life ===
- All Tracks

=== U.N.L.V. - Straight Out tha Gutta ===
- All Tracks

Lil slim - powder shop

== 1995 ==
=== B.G. - True Story ===
- 01. "True Story"
- 02. "Get On My Feet"
- 03. "Start "N" Tha Game"
- 04. "From Tha 13th To Tha 17th"
- 05. "Hood Took Me Under"
- 06. "Down For My Stacks"
- 07. "Thrill B'G"
- 08. "Fuck Big Boy"

=== U.N.L.V. - Mac Melph Calio ===
- All Tracks

=== Gregory D - Niggaz In Da Boot ===
- 04. "5-4-3-2-1"
- 06. "Freestyle"
- 08. "Nightmare On Slanga Street"
- 15. "Strippers Boom "

=== Kilo G – The Bloody City ===
- Tired Of Being F*cked With produced by Mannie Fresh
- Coasting produced by Mannie Fresh
- Intro produced by Mannie Fresh
- Pop'em produced by Mannie Fresh

Lil slim - thuggin and pluggin

 All tracks.

== 1996 ==
=== Magnolia Shorty-"Monkey On Tha D$Ck" ===
- All Tracks

=== B.G. - Chopper City ===
- All Tracks

==== U.N.L.V. - Uptown 4 Life ====
- All Tracks

==== Pimp Daddy - Pimpin Aint E-Z ====
- All Tracks

==== Ms. Tee - Female Baller ====
- All Tracks

==== L.O.G. – G's & Soldiers ====
- 02. "G's N' Soldiers"
- 05. "S.A.C. Mafia For Life"

== 1997 ==
=== B.G. - It's All on U, Vol. 1 ===
- All Tracks

=== B.G. - It's All On U Vol. 2 ===
- All Tracks

=== Hot Boys - Get It How U Live! ===
- All Tracks

=== Juvenile - Solja Rags ===
- All Tracks

== 1998 ==
=== Big Tymers - How You Luv That ===
- All Tracks

=== Juvenile - 400 Degreez ===
- All Tracks

== 1999 ==
=== T-Mac - Shinin & Big Tymin' ===
- "Millionaire Playas" (feat. Big Tymers)

=== First Born - Riders ===
- 01. "Intro"
- 05. "Tru Soldiers"
- 13. "Pray for Me"
- 14. "Riders"
- 16. "Outro"

=== Various Artists - Blue Streak (soundtrack) ===
- 08. "Rock Ice" - Hot Boys & Big Tymers

=== B.G. - Chopper City in the Ghetto ===
- All Tracks

=== Various Artists - The Wood (soundtrack) ===
- 05. "The Hood (it's All Good)" - Cash Money Millionaires

=== Hot Boys - Guerrilla Warfare ===
- All Tracks

=== Project Pat - Ghetty Green ===
- 12. "Choppers" (feat. B.G. & Big Tymers)
- 20. "Ballers (CM Remix) [feat. Cash Money Millionaires]

=== Tear Da Club Up Thugs - CrazyNDaLazDayz ===
- 14. "Hypnotize Cash Money" (feat. Birdman & Hot Boys) {co-produced by DJ Paul & Juicy J}

=== Noreaga - Melvin Flynt - Da Hustler ===
- 17. "Play That Shit (We Dont' Play That)" [feat. Goldfingaz, Juvenile, Musaliny-n-Maze & Lil Wayne]

=== Rally Boys - Rally World ===
- 06. "Rally Up" (feat. Lil Wayne & Big Tymers)

=== Juvenile - Tha G-Code ===
- All Tracks

=== Lil Wayne - Tha Block Is Hot ===
- All Tracks

=== The Notorious B.I.G. - Born Again ===
- 04. "Hope You Niggas Sleep" (feat. Hot Boys & Big Tymers)

=== Funkmaster Flex + Big Kap - The Tunnel ===
- 14. "Respect" (feat. Cash Money Millionaires)

=== Various Artists - Next Friday (soundtrack) ===
- 10. "Good Friday" - Big Tymers, Lil Wayne & Mack 10

== 2000 ==
=== B.G. - Checkmate ===
- All Tracks

=== Big Tymers - I Got That Work ===
- All Tracks

=== DJ Clue - Backstage: Music Inspired by the Film ===
- 10. "Millionaire" - Hot Boys & Big Tymers

=== Cash Money Millionaires - Baller Blockin' ===
- 01. "Intro" - Lovely & Article
- 02. "Baller Blockin'" - Turk, Baby, Juvenile & E-40
- 04. "Rover Truck" - Juvenile
- 06. "Project Bitch" - Big Tymers, Juvenile & Lil Wayne
- 08. "Thugged Out" - B.G.
- 11. "Calling Me Killer" - Lil Wayne
- 13. "Whatever" - Baby, Lac & Stone
- 14. "Let Us Stunt" - Big Tymers, Turk & B.G.
- 17. "Uptown" - Turk & B.G.

=== Various Artists - Romeo Must Die (soundtrack) ===
- 04. "Rollin Raw" - B.G.

=== Lil Wayne - Lights Out ===
- All Tracks

=== Strings - The Black Widow ===
- 14. "Cash Money"

== 2001 ==
=== Various Artists - Hardball (soundtrack) ===
- 03. "You Can't Break Me" - Big Tymers

=== Mil - Street Scriptures ===
- 05. "Ride Out" (feat. B.G., Beanie Sigel & Lil Wayne)

=== Petey Pablo - single ===
- "Blow Your Whistle"

=== Juvenile - Project English ===
- All Tracks

=== Mack 10 - Bang or Ball ===
- All Tracks [except "Hate in Yo Eyes", "Work", and "Let It Be Known"]

=== Turk - Young & Thuggin' ===
- All Tracks

=== Various Artists - Baby Boy (soundtrack) ===
- 11. "Thatshowwegetdown" - B.G., Lac & Baby

== 2002 ==
=== Baby - Birdman ===
- 01. "Bird Lady Talkin' (Intro)"
- 03. "Fly in Any Weather"
- 04. "Ms. Bird Pageant Pt. 1"
- 05. "Ms. Bird"
- 06. "I Got To"
- 07. "Never Had Nothing"
- 09. "Ms. Bird Live From Superdome"
- 14. "Hustlas, Pimps, and Thugs"
- 15. "Fly Away"
- 16. "Say It Ain't So"
- 17. "Ms. Bird Pageant Pt. 3"
- 20. "Ms. Bird Pageant Pt. 4"
- 22. "Keeps Spinnin'"

=== Big Tymers - Hood Rich ===
- All Tracks [except "Sunny Day", "I'm Coming", and "Greg Street Radio"]

=== Tank - One Man ===
- 11. "Let Me Live" (feat. Jazze Pha & Mannie Fresh)
- 12. "Party like a Thug" (feat. Baby)

=== Lil Wayne - 500 Degreez ===
- All Tracks

=== Toni Braxton - More Than a Woman ===
- 02. "Give it Back" (feat. Big Tymers)

== 2003 ==
=== Hot Boys - Let 'Em Burn ===
- All Tracks

=== Various Artists - Cradle 2 the Grave (soundtrack) ===
- 14. "Won't Be Coming Back" - Baby

=== Dirty - Keep It Pimp & Gangsta ===
- 04. "That's Dirty" (feat. Mannie Fresh)

=== Boo & Gotti - Perfect Timing ===
- 01. "Perfect Timing"
- 02. "Chi-Town"
- 04. "Bad Chicks at the Bar"
- 08. "1 Adam 12"
- 09. "Pimp Poetry Interlude"
- 10. "Baby Girl"
- 11. "Chicago"
- 12. "P.I.M.P. Affair Interlude"
- 14. "Think..."
- 17. "Out Here"

=== Murphy Lee - Murphy's Law ===
- 03. "Hold Up" (feat. Nelly)

=== Big Tymers - Big Money Heavyweight ===
- All Tracks [except "Gangsta Girl"]

=== David Banner - MTA2 Baptized in Dirty Water ===
- 14. "So in Love"

=== Juvenile - Juve the Great ===
- 02. "In My Life"
- 05. "Bounce Back"
- 07. "It Ain't Mines"
- 09. "Lil Daddy"
- 11. "Cock It"

== 2004 ==
=== Petey Pablo - Still Writing in My Diary: 2nd Entry ===
- 02. "Did You Miss Me" (feat. TQ & Birdman)

=== Teena Marie - La Doña ===
- 02. "Still in Love"

=== Lil Wayne - Tha Carter ===
- All Tracks [except "We Don't", "Tha Heat" & "Who Wanna"]

=== T.I. - Urban Legend ===
- 09. "The Greatest" (featuring Mannie Fresh)

=== Mannie Fresh - The Mind of Mannie Fresh ===
- All Tracks

== 2005 ==
=== Baby - Fast Money ===
- 05. "Hug da Block"
- 15. "Solid Chic"
- 16. "We Getting It On"
- 17. "Get Your Shine On"

=== TQ - Listen... ===
- 08. "Angela Jones" {co-produced by TQ & Bearwolf}
- 11. "Until" {co-produced by TQ & Bearwolf}

=== Webbie - Savage Life ===
- 10. "What Is It?"
- 14. "Come Here Bitch" (feat. Mannie Fresh)

=== Bun B - Trill ===
- 05. "I'm Fresh" (feat. Mannie Fresh)
- 09. "What I Represent (UGK)"

=== Chamillionaire - The Sound of Revenge ===
- 13. "Fly As the Sky" (feat. Lil Wayne & Rasaq)

=== Slim Thug - Already Platinum ===
- 00. "Diamonds (Remix)" [feat. Young Jeezy, Killa Kyleon, & Slick Pulla]

=== Trina - Glamorest Life ===
- 02. "Don't Trip" (feat. Lil Wayne)
- 06. "Da Club" (feat. Mannie Fresh)

=== Young Jeezy - Let's Get It: Thug Motivation 101 ===
- 05. "And Then What" (feat. Mannie Fresh)

=== YoungBloodZ - Ev'rybody Know Me ===
- 07. "What Tha Biz (If I)" (feat. Mannie Fresh)

=== Jody Breeze - A Day in the Life of Jody Breeze ===
- 06. "White Tees" (feat. Mannie Fresh)

== 2006 ==
=== B.G. - The Heart of tha Streetz, Vol. 2 (I Am What I Am) ===
- 03. "Move Around"

=== Chingy - Hoodstar ===
- 10. "Brand New Kicks"

=== Frankie J - Priceless ===
- 01. "That Girl" (feat. Mannie Fresh & Chamillionaire)

=== Joi - Tennessee Slim Is the Bomb ===
- 00. "10 Reasons Why" (Unreleased)

=== Juvenile - Reality Check ===
- 15. "Animal"

=== Sqad Up - We Do This ===
- 02. "Parking Lot" (feat. Mannie Fresh)

=== Suga Free - Just Add Water ===
- 25. "So Fly Remix"

=== Pimp C - Pimpalation ===
- 12. "Cheat on Yo Man" (feat. Suga and Mannie Fresh)

=== Tyrese - Alter Ego ===
- 07. "What It Is" (feat. Mannie Fresh)

=== T.I. - King ===
- 02. "Front Back" (feat. UGK)
- 10. "Top Back"

=== Rich Boy - Bring It to the Block ===
- 05. "D-Boyz" (feat. Mannie Fresh)

=== Trick Daddy - Back by Thug Demand ===
- 14. "Chevy" (feat. Young Steff)

== 2007 ==
=== Lil Flip - I Need Mine ===
- 14. "What It Do" (feat. Mannie Fresh)

=== Mike Jones - The American Dream ===
- 09. "Bonnie & Clyde"
- 12. "Don't Play Around"

=== T.I. - T.I. vs. T.I.P. ===
- 02. "Big Things Poppin' (Do It)"
- 05. "Da Dopeman"

== 2008 ==
=== Blood Raw - My Life: The True Testimony ===
- 04. "Almost There" (feat. Mannie Fresh)

=== Plies - Da REAList ===
- 14. "Pants Hang Low"

=== Rick Ross - Trilla ===
- 02. "All I Have in This World (Japanese Denim)" [feat. Mannie Fresh]

=== Webbie - Savage Life 2 ===
- 04. "I Know" (feat. Young Dro)

=== Dem Franchize Boyz - Our World, Our Way ===
- 03. "Mr. Feel Good" (feat. Mannie Fresh)

=== Drake - "I'm Still Fly" ===
- 00. "I'm Still Fly"

== 2009 ==
=== Mike Jones - The Voice ===
- 08. "Give Me a Call" (feat. Devin the Dude)

=== Slim Thug - Boss of All Bosses ===
- 04. "Show Me Love" (feat. Mannie Fresh)

=== UGK - UGK 4 Life ===
- 05. "The Pimp & The Bun" (feat. Ron Isley)

=== Gucci Mane - The State vs. Radric Davis ===
- 15. "Gingerbread Man" (feat. OJ Da Juiceman)

=== B.G. - Too Hood 2 Be Hollywood ===
- 05. "My Hood" (feat. Gar & Mannie Fresh)
- 11. "Chopper City Is an Army"

=== Mannie Fresh - Return of the Ballin' ===
- 01. "Like a Boss"
- 02. "American Dream"
- 03. "Drought"
- 06. "Go Girl"

=== T-Pain - Take Your Shirt Off ===
- "Take Your Shirt Off"

== 2010 ==
=== Dee-1 - I Hope They Hear Me Vol. 2 ===
- 10. "The One That Got Away" (featuring Mannie Fresh)

== 2011 ==
=== Gucci Mane - The Gucci Glacier 3.0 ===
- 06. "Contagious"

== 2012 ==
=== Dee-1 - The Focus Tape ===
- Mixtape host

=== GOOD Music - Cruel Summer ===
- 09. "The One" (Kanye West, Big Sean, 2 Chainz and Marsha Ambrosius) {very additional production}

=== Juvenile - Rejuvenation ===
- 01. "Rejuvenation"
- 02. "Power"
- 07. "Fall Back"
- 08. "Bad Guy"
- 14. "Toast to the Good Life"

=== T.I. - Fuck Da City Up ===
- 12. "The One"

=== TQ - New Music Tuesday ===
- 10. "Early This Morning"

== 2013 ==
=== Yasiin Bey & Mannie Fresh - OMFGOD ===
- 00. "Black Jesus"
- 00. "Let's Go"

=== Doe B - Baby Jesus ===
- 15. "All We Know"

=== CTE World - Boss Yo Life Up Gang ===
- 19. "Outro"

=== 2 Chainz - B.O.A.T.S. II: Me Time ===
- 06. "Used 2"

== 2014 ==
=== Turk - Da Real Thugga ===
- 06. "Trife Living"

== 2015 ==
=== Lil Wayne - No Ceilings 2 ===
- 01. "Fresh" (featuring Mannie Fresh)

== 2016 ==
=== Lil Uzi Vert & Gucci Mane - 1017 vs. The World ===
- 03. "Blonde Brigitte"

=== 2 Chainz - ColleGrove ===
- 04. "Gotta Lotta" (featuring Lil Wayne)

== 2017 ==
=== Big K.R.I.T. – 4eva Is a Mighty Long Time ===
- 04. "Subenstein (My Sub IV)"
- 05. "1999" (featuring Lloyd)

=== Big Boi – Boomiverse ===
- 04. "Follow Deez"

=== Grace – FMA ===
- 08. "From You"
- 12. "Say"

== 2018 ==
=== Webbie & Joeazzy - T4L (Trill 4Life) ===
- 01. "It'z Up" (featuring Bun B)

=== Bun B - Return of the Trill ===
- 05. TrapHandz (featuring Yo Gotti and 2 Chainz)

=== Lil Wayne - Tha Carter V ===
- 17. "Start This Shit Off Right" (featuring Mack Maine and Ashanti)
- 21. "Perfect Strangers"

== 2020 ==
=== Lil Wayne - Funeral ===
- 02. "Mahogany"
- 19. "Piano Trap"

== 2022 ==
=== 2 Chainz - Dope Don't Sell Itself ===
- 07. "Free B.G."

== 2023 ==
=== 2 Chainz & Lil Wayne – Welcome 2 Collegrove ===
05. "Long Story Short" (produced with Big K.R.I.T. and Juicy J)

== 2025 ==
=== Lil Wayne - Tha Carter VI ===
- 16. "Being Myself" (featuring Mannie Fresh)
