= B.G. discography =

Hip hop recording artist discography

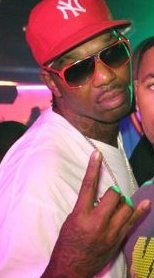
- B.G. in 2011
- Studio albums: 10
- Singles: 21
- Music videos: 12
- Mixtapes: 2
- Promotional singles: 1

The discography of American rapper B.G. consists of ten studio albums, two mixtapes, twenty-one singles, one promotional single and twelve music videos.

== Albums ==
=== Studio albums ===
List of studio albums, with selected chart positions and certifications
| Title | Album details | Peak chart positions | | Certifications |
| Title | Album details | US | US R&B | Certifications |
|---|---|---|---|---|
| Chopper City | Released: November 26, 1996; Label: Cash Money, Universal; Format: CD, LP, cassette, digital download | — | — | |
| It's All on U, Vol. 1 | Released: July 1, 1997; Label: Cash Money, Universal; Format: CD, LP, cassette, digital download | — | 40 | |
| It's All on U, Vol. 2 | Released: November 11, 1997; Label: Cash Money, Universal; Format: CD, LP, cassette, digital download | 184 | 20 | |
| Chopper City in the Ghetto | Released: April 20, 1999; Label: Cash Money, Universal; Format: CD, LP, cassette, digital download | 9 | 2 | RIAA: Platinum |
| Checkmate | Released: November 21, 2000; Label: Cash Money, Universal; Format: CD, digital download | 21 | 5 | RIAA: Gold |
| Livin' Legend | Released: February 25, 2003; Label: Chopper City, Koch; Format: CD, digital download | 21 | 4 | |
| Life After Cash Money | Released: July 27, 2004; Label: Chopper City, Koch; Format: CD, digital download | 22 | 2 | |
| The Heart of tha Streetz, Vol. 1 | Released: May 24, 2005; Label: Chopper City, Koch; Format: CD, digital download | 21 | 6 | |
| The Heart of tha Streetz, Vol. 2 (I Am What I Am) | Released: March 21, 2006; Label: Chopper City, Koch; Format: CD, digital download | 6 | 2 | |
| Too Hood 2 Be Hollywood | Released: December 8, 2009; Label: Chopper City, E1 Music, Atlantic; Format: CD, digital download | 77 | 14 | |
| Freedom of Speech | Released: March 14, 2025; Label: Chopper City; Format: CD, digital download | — | — | |
"—" denotes a recording that did not chart.

=== Collaborative albums ===
List of albums, with selected chart positions
| Title | Album details | Peak chart positions | |
| Title | Album details | US | US R&B |
|---|---|---|---|
| True Story (with Lil Wayne) | Released: July 28, 1995; Label: Cash Money, Universal; Format: CD, LP, cassette | — | — |
| We Got This (with Chopper City Boyz) | Released: February 27, 2007; Label: Chopper City, Koch; Format: CD, digital download | 21 | 4 |
| Life in the Concrete Jungle (with Chopper City Boyz) | Released: September 16, 2008; Label: Chopper City, Asylum; Format: CD, digital download | 117 | 12 |

== Mixtapes ==
| Title | Mixtape details |
|---|---|
| 22504 (with Lil Boosie) | Released: June 6, 2010; Label: Chopper City, Bad Azz; Format: CD, digital download, streaming |
| Choppers & Bricks (with Gucci Mane) | Released: December 15, 2023; Label: Global Music, Atlantic; Format: Digital download, streaming |

== Singles ==
=== As lead artist ===
List of singles as a lead artist, with selected chart positions, showing year released and album name
| Title | Year | Peak chart positions | | | | Album |
| Title | Year | US | US R&B | US Rap | US Rhyth. | Album |
|---|---|---|---|---|---|---|
| "Bling Bling" (featuring Lil Wayne, Turk, Juvenile, Baby and Mannie Fresh) | 1999 | 36 | 13 | 10 | 11 | Chopper City in the Ghetto |
| "Cash Money Is An Army" | 1999 | — | — (Note: "Cash Money Is An Army" did not enter the Hot R&B/Hip-Hop Songs chart, but peaked at number six on the Bubbling Under R&B/Hip-Hop Singles chart.) | — | — | Chopper City in the Ghetto |
| "I Know" (featuring Lil Wayne) | 2000 | — | 86 | — | — | Checkmate |
| "Hennessy & XTC" | 2001 | — | 91 | — | — | Checkmate |
| "Bounce with Me" | 2001 | — | — | — | — | Checkmate |
| "Hottest of the Hot" | 2003 | — | 74 | — | — | Livin' Legend |
| "I Keep It Gangsta" | 2003 | — | — | — | — | Livin' Legend |
| "I Want It" | 2004 | — | — (Note: "I Want It" did not enter the Hot R&B/Hip-Hop Songs chart, but peaked at number five on the Bubbling Under R&B/Hip-Hop Singles chart.) | — | — | Life After Cash Money |
| "Where Da At?" (featuring Homebwoi) | 2005 | — | 65 | — | — | The Heart of tha Streetz, Vol. 1 |
| "Move Around" (featuring Mannie Fresh) | 2006 | — (Note: "Move Around" did not enter the Billboard Hot 100, but peaked at number 13 on the Bubbling Under Hot 100 Singles chart.) | 52 | — | — | The Heart of tha Streetz, Vol. 2 (I Am What I Am) |
| "Make 'Em Mad" (with Chopper City Boyz) | 2007 | — | — | — | — | We Got This |
| "For a Minute" (featuring T.I.) | 2007 | — | — | — | — | Too Hood 2 Be Hollywood |
| "Bubblegum" (with Chopper City Boyz) | 2008 | — | — | — | — | Life in the Concrete Jungle |
| "Ya Heard Me" (featuring Trey Songz, Juvenile and Lil Wayne) | 2009 | — | — | — | — | Too Hood 2 Be Hollywood |
| "My Hood" (featuring Gar and Mannie Fresh) | 2009 | — | 70 | — | — | Too Hood 2 Be Hollywood |
| "Back to the Money" (featuring Magnolia Chop) | 2010 | — | — | — | — | Too Hood 2 Be Hollywood |
"—" denotes a recording that did not chart.

=== As featured artist ===
List of singles as a featured artist, with selected chart positions, showing year released and album name
| Title | Year | Peak chart positions | | | Album |
| Title | Year | US | US R&B | US Rap | Album |
|---|---|---|---|---|---|
| "Tha Block Is Hot" (Lil Wayne featuring Juvenile and B.G.) | 1999 | 72 | 24 | 27 | Tha Block Is Hot |
| "Y.B.E. (Young Black Entrepreneurs)" (Prodigy featuring B.G.) | 2000 | — | — | 42 | H.N.I.C. |
| "Ride Out" (Mil featuring B.G., Lil Wayne and Beanie Sigel) | 2001 | — | — | — | Street Scriptures |
| "Y'all Heard of Me" (C-Murder featuring B.G.) | 2005 | — | — | — | The Truest Shit I Ever Said |
| "Top Back" (Remix) (T.I. featuring Young Jeezy, Young Dro, Big Kuntry King and B.G.) | 2006 | — | — | — | Grand Hustle Presents: In da Streetz Volume 4 |
"—" denotes a recording that did not chart.

=== Promotional singles ===
List of promotional singles, showing year released and album name
| Title | Year | Album |
|---|---|---|
| "Shoot 'Em Up Bang Bang" | 2002 | Living Legend |

== Guest appearances ==
List of non-single guest appearances, with other performing artists, showing year released and album name
| Title | Year | Other performer(s) | Album |
|---|---|---|---|
| "I Did That" | 1997 | Juvenile, Turk, Big Moe | Solja Rags |
| "Welcome 2 Tha Section" | 1997 | Juvenile, Mannie Fresh, Bulletproof | Solja Rags |
| "Tear It Up" | 1997 | Big Tymers, Lil Wayne | How You Luv That |
| "Suga & Pac, Puff & Big (6 Fig)" | 1997 | Big Tymers, Lil Wayne | How You Luv That |
| "How Should I Ride?" | 1998 | Big Tymers, Lac | How You Luv That Vol. 2 |
| "Flossin' Season" | 1998 | Juvenile, Big Tymers, Lil Wayne | 400 Degreez |
| "U Can't Resist" | 1999 | Missy Elliott, Juvenile | Da Real World |
| "Choppers" | 1999 | Project Pat, Baby | Ghetty Green |
| "Look at Me" | 1999 | E-40, Baby, Lil Wayne, Juvenile | Charlie Hustle: The Blueprint of a Self-Made Millionaire |
| "Loud Pipes" | 1999 | Lil Wayne, Juvenile, Big Tymers | Tha Block Is Hot |
| "High Beamin'" | 1999 | Lil Wayne | Tha Block Is Hot |
| "Remember Me" | 1999 | Lil Wayne | Tha Block Is Hot |
| "Drop It Like It's Hot" | 1999 | Lil Wayne, Mannie Fresh | Tha Block Is Hot |
| "Not Like Me" | 1999 | Lil Wayne, Big Tymers, Papa Reu | Tha Block Is Hot |
| "Come On" | 1999 | Lil Wayne | Tha Block Is Hot |
| "Fuck That Nigga" | 1999 | Juvenile | Tha G-Code |
| "Catch Your Cut" | 1999 | Juvenile | Tha G-Code |
| "Get It Right" | 1999 | Juvenile, Lil Wayne | Tha G-Code |
| "Never Had Shit" | 1999 | Juvenile, Baby, Turk | Tha G-Code |
| "Guerrilla" | 1999 | Juvenile | Tha G-Code |
| "Respect" | 1999 | Funkmaster Flex & Big Kap, Lil Wayne, Mannie Fresh | The Tunnel |
| "We Hustle" | 2000 | Big Tymers, Juvenile, Turk | I Got That Work |
| "Stuntastic" | 2000 | Big Tymers | I Got That Work |
| "Big Tymers" | 2000 | Big Tymers, Lac, Stone | I Got That Work |
| "Thugged Out" | 2000 | —N/a | Baller Blockin' (soundtrack) |
| "UpTown" | 2000 | Turk | Baller Blockin' (soundtrack) |
| "Rollin' Raw" | 2000 | —N/a | Romeo Must Die (soundtrack) |
| "Act a Ass" | 2000 | Lil Wayne | Lights Out |
| "Ride Out" | 2001 | Mil, Lil Wayne, Beanie SIgel | Street Scriptures |
| "Yes We Do" | 2001 | Turk, Lac, Lil Wayne, Mack 10 | Young & Thuggin' |
| "Hallways & Cuts" | 2001 | Turk, Mickey | Young & Thuggin' |
| "that'showwegetdown" | 2001 | Baby, Lac | Baby Boy soundtrack |
| "Let the Thugs in the Club" | 2001 | Mack 10, Lil Wayne | Bang or Ball |
| "Dog About It" | 2001 | Mack 10 | Bang or Ball |
| "What They Do" | 2004 | T.I. | Urban Legend |
| "U Know My Kind" | 2004 | Body Head Bangerz | Body Head Bangerz: Volume One |
| "Salt Shaker" (Extended Remix) | 2004 | Ying Yang Twins, Murphy Lee, Fat Joe, Fatman Scoop, Lil Jon, Jacki-O, Juvenile, Pitbull | My Brother & Me |
| "Trill" | 2005 | Paul Wall, Bun B | The Peoples Champ |
| "Bloody War" | 2005 | David Banner | Certified |
| "The Walk" | 2005 | Ying Yang Twins, Da Muzicianz, Countrie Biggz, Homebwoi | U.S.A. (United State of Atlanta) |
| "Gotta Show Me You Worth It" | 2005 | Webbie | Savage Life |
| "Toot Dat Booty Up" | 2005 | Dirtbag | "Ladies Luv Me" single |
| "1 Thing" (Remix) | 2005 | Amerie | "1 Thing" single |
| "Tru Hustla" (Remix) | 2005 | Twisted Black | The Life of Tommy Burns |
| "I'm Straight" | 2006 | T.I., Young Jeezy | King |
| "Hood Drug Warz" | 2006 | DJ Kayslay, Greg Street, Lil Wyte, Three 6 Mafia | The Champions: North Meets South |
| "Die for Mine" | 2006 | C-Murder | The Tru Story: Continued |
| "Fuck Being Famous" | 2006 | Big Kuntry King | Grand Hustle Presents: In da Streetz Volume 4 |
| "I'm Out Here" | 2006 | None | Grand Hustle Presents: In da Streetz Volume 4 |
| "187" | 2007 | DJ Drama, 8Ball & MJG, Project Pat | Gangsta Grillz: The Album |
| "Paradise" (Remix) | 2008 | TQ | Paradise |
| "Gangsta" | 2009 | Maino | If Tomorrow Comes... |
| "N.O. in Me" | 2009 | C-Murder | Calliope Click Volume 1 |
| "Feeling Right" | 2009 | Juvenile, Cape, Kango Slim | Cocky & Confident |
| "Gotta Get It" | 2009 | DJ Drama, Juvenile, Soulja Slim | Gangsta Grillz: The Album (Vol. 2) |
| "Dicc on U" | 2012 | Z-Ro, Mr. Mac T | Angel Dust |
| "Betta Know It" | 2012 | Young Buck | Strictly 4 Traps n Trunks 44: Free Young Buck Edition |
| "Ghetto Pass" | 2015 | Turk | Get Money Stay Real 2 |
| "Now Is The Time" | 2024 | Rakim, Hus Kingpin, Compton Menace | G.O.D.'s Network REB7RTH |

== Music videos ==
=== As lead artist ===
List of music videos as a lead artist, with directors, showing year released
| Title | Year | Director(s) |
|---|---|---|
| "Bling Bling" (featuring Lil Wayne, Turk, Juvenile, Baby and Mannie Fresh) | 1999 | Scott Kalvert |
| "Cash Money Is an Army" | 1999 | Marc Klasfeld |
| "I Know" (featuring Lil Wayne) | 2000 | David Palmer |
| "Hennessy & XTC" (featuring Big Tymers) | 2000 | Unknown |
| "Where Da At?" (featuring Homebwoi) | 2005 | Jeff Richter |
| "Move Around" (featuring Mannie Fresh) | 2006 | Gil Green, Dayo |
| "Make 'Em Mad" (with Chopper City Boyz) | 2006 | Unknown |
| "My Hood" (featuring Gar and Mannie Fresh) | 2009 | Gabriel Hart |

=== As featured artist ===
List of music videos as a featured artist, with directors, showing year released
| Title | Year | Director(s) |
|---|---|---|
| "Tha Block Is Hot" (Lil Wayne featuring Juvenile and B.G.) | 1999 | Dave Meyers |
| "Y.B.E. (Young Black Entrepreneurs)" (Prodigy featuring B.G.) | 2001 | Little X |
| "They Hatin' on Me" (Ke'Noe featuring B.G.) | 2002 | Rich Newey |
| "Y'all Heard of Me" (C-Murder featuring B.G.) | 2005 | Will Horton |
