= Cash Money Records discography =

Recording catalog

List of albums released or distributed by Cash Money Records.

== 1990s ==
=== 1992 ===
1. Kilo-G - The Sleepwalker

=== 1993 ===
1. Lil' Slim - The Game Is Cold
2. B-32 (now known as Baby/Birdman) - I Need A Bag Of Dope
3. U.N.L.V. - 6th & Baronne
4. PxMxWx - Legalize "Pass Tha Weed"
5. Ms. Tee - Chillin' On Tha Corner
6. Pimp Daddy - Still Pimpin'

=== 1994 ===
1. Lil' Slim - Powder $hop
2. U.N.L.V. - Straight Out Tha Gutta
3. PxMxWx - High Life
4. Mr. Ivan - 187 In "A" Hockey Mask

=== 1995 ===
1. Lil' Slim - Thug'n & Pluggin'
2. M$. Tee - Having Thing$!!
3. U.N.L.V. - Mac Melph Calio
4. B.G.'z - True Story
5. Kilo G - The Bloody City
6. Tec-9 - Straight From Tha Ramp!!

=== 1996 ===
1. U.N.L.V. - Uptown 4 Life
2. Pimp Daddy - Pimp'n Ain't E-Z
3. Ms. Tee - Female Baller
4. B.G. - Chopper City

=== 1997 ===
1. Magnolia Shorty - Monkey On Tha D$ck
2. Juvenile - Solja Rags
3. B.G. - It's All On U, Vol 1
4. Hot Boys - Get It How U Live!!
5. B.G. - It's All On U, Vol. 2
6. U.N.L.V. - Greatest Hits With New Songs

=== 1998 ===
1. Big Tymers - How You Luv That
2. Big Tymers - How You Luv That, Vol. 2
3. Juvenile - 400 Degreez

=== 1999 ===
1. B.G. - Chopper City In The Ghetto
2. Hot Boys - Guerrilla Warfare
3. Lil Wayne - Tha Block Is Hot
4. Juvenile - Tha G-Code

== 2000s ==
=== 2000 ===
1. Big Tymers - I Got That Work
2. Cash Money Millionaires - Platinum Instrumentals
3. Cash Money Millionaires - Baller Blockin'
4. B.G. - Checkmate
5. Lil Wayne - Lights Out

=== 2001 ===
1. Turk - Young & Thuggin'
2. Juvenile - Project English
3. Mack 10 - Bang or Ball

=== 2002 ===
1. Big Tymers - Hood Rich
2. Lil Wayne - 500 Degreez
3. Cash Money Millionaires - Undisputed (soundtrack)
4. Birdman (as Baby) - Birdman
5. Cash Money Millionaires - Platinum Hits (Vol. 1)

=== 2003 ===
1. Hot Boys - Let 'Em Burn
2. Boo & Gotti - Perfect Timing
3. Big Tymers - Big Money Heavyweight
4. Juvenile - Juve The Great

=== 2004 ===
1. Teena Marie - La Doña
2. Juvenile - The Greatest Hits
3. Lil Wayne - Tha Carter
4. Mannie Fresh - The Mind of Mannie Fresh

=== 2005 ===
1. Birdman - Fast Money
2. Lil Wayne - Tha Carter II

=== 2006 ===
1. Teena Marie - Sapphire
2. Birdman & Lil Wayne - Like Father, Like Son

=== 2007 ===
1. Birdman - 5 ★ Stunna
2. Lil Wayne - The Leak EP
3. Cash Money Millionaires - 10 Years Of Bling (Vol. 1)

=== 2008 ===
1. Cash Money Millionaires - 10 Years Of Bling (Vol. 2)
2. Lil Wayne - Tha Carter III
3. Kevin Rudolf - In The City

=== 2009 ===
1. Drake - So Far Gone EP
2. Birdman - Pricele$$
3. Jay Sean - All or Nothing
4. Young Money - We Are Young Money

== 2010s ==
=== 2010 ===
1. Lil Wayne - Rebirth
2. Drake - Thank Me Later
3. Kevin Rudolf - To the Sky
4. Lil Wayne - I Am Not a Human Being
5. Nicki Minaj - Pink Friday

=== 2011 ===
1. DJ Khaled - We the Best Forever
2. Lil Wayne - Tha Carter IV
3. Glasses Malone - Beach Cruiser
4. Drake - Take Care

=== 2012 ===
1. Tyga - Careless World: Rise of the Last King
2. Nicki Minaj - Pink Friday: Roman Reloaded
3. DJ Khaled - Kiss The Ring
4. Nicki Minaj - Pink Friday: Roman Reloaded – The Re-Up

=== 2013 ===
1. Lil Wayne - I Am Not a Human Being II
2. Tyga - Hotel California
3. PJ Morton - New Orleans
4. Ace Hood - Trials & Tribulations
5. YMCMB - Rich Gang
6. Jay Sean - Neon
7. Drake - Nothing Was the Same
8. DJ Khaled - Suffering from Success

=== 2014 ===
1. Young Money - Young Money: Rise of an Empire
2. Austin Mahone - The Secret
3. Rich Gang - Rich Gang: Tha Tour Pt. 1
4. Nicki Minaj - The Pinkprint

=== 2015 ===
1. Drake - If You're Reading This It's Too Late
2. Chris Brown X Tyga - Fan of a Fan: The Album
3. Glasses Malone - Glass House 2: Life Ain't Nothin' But
4. Drake & Future - What a Time to Be Alive
5. Jacquees - Quemix 2

=== 2016 ===
1. Birdman & Jacquees - Lost At Sea
2. Jacquees - Mood
3. Drake - Views

=== 2017 ===
1. Drake - More Life
2. Jacquees - Since You Playin'
3. Karine Hannah - Anytime EP

=== 2018 ===
1. Rich Gang- Before Anythang (Music from the Motion Picture)
2. Jacquees - 4275
3. Drake - Scorpion
4. Nicki Minaj - Queen
5. Birdman & Jacquees - Lost at Sea 2

=== 2019 ===
1. Birdman & Juvenile - Just Another Gangsta
2. Jacquees - King of R&B
3. Jacquees - Christmas in Decatur

== 2020s ==
=== 2020 ===
1. Blueface - Find the Beat

=== 2021 ===
1. Birdman & YoungBoy Never Broke Again - From the Bayou

=== 2022 ===
1. Nicki Minaj - Queen Radio: Volume 1
2. Jacquees - Sincerely For You

2023

1. Nicki Minaj - Pink Friday 2

== Platinum albums ==
1. 1998: 400 Degreez - Juvenile (4× Platinum)
2. 1999: Chopper City in the Ghetto - B.G.
3. 1999: Guerrilla Warfare - Hot Boys
4. 1999: Tha G-Code - Juvenile
5. 1999: Tha Block is Hot - Lil Wayne
6. 2000: I Got That Work - Big Tymers
7. 2002: Hood Rich - Big Tymers
8. 2003: Juve the Great - Juvenile
9. 2004: Tha Carter - Lil Wayne (2× Platinum)
10. 2005: Tha Carter II - Lil Wayne (2× Platinum)
11. 2008: Tha Carter III - Lil Wayne (8× Platinum)
12. 2010: Thank Me Later - Drake (4× Platinum)
13. 2010: Pink Friday - Nicki Minaj (3× Platinum)
14. 2011: Tha Carter IV - Lil Wayne (5× Platinum)
15. 2011: Take Care - Drake (4× Platinum)
16. 2012: Pink Friday: Roman Reloaded - Nicki Minaj (2× Platinum)
17. 2013: Nothing Was the Same - Drake (6× Platinum)
18. 2014: The Pinkprint - Nicki Minaj (2× Platinum)
19. 2015: If You're Reading This It's Too Late - Drake (4× Platinum)
20. 2015: What a Time to Be Alive - Drake & Future (2× Platinum)
21. 2016: Views - Drake (8× Platinum)
22. 2018: Scorpion - Drake (7× Platinum)
23. 2018: Queen - Nicki Minaj
24. 2023: Pink Friday 2 - Nicki Minaj

== Gold albums ==
1. 2000: Checkmate - B.G.
2. 2000: Lights Out - Lil Wayne
3. 2000: Baller Blockin' (soundtrack) - Cash Money Millionaires
4. 2001: Young & Thuggin' - Turk
5. 2001: Project English - Juvenile
6. 2002: Birdman - Baby
7. 2002: 500 Degreez - Lil Wayne
8. 2003: Big Money Heavyweight - Big Tymers
9. 2006: Like Father, Like Son - Birdman & Lil Wayne
10. 2009: So Far Gone - Drake
11. 2009: We Are Young Money - Young Money
12. 2010: Rebirth - Lil Wayne
13. 2013: I Am Not a Human Being II - Lil Wayne
