= Mannie Fresh discography =

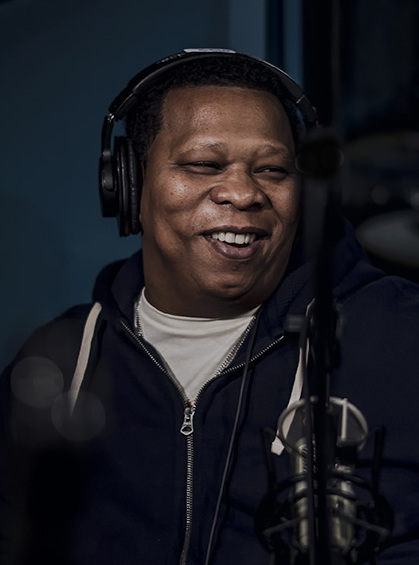
- Mannie Fresh interview on The Come Up Show Podcast in 2017
- Studio albums: 2
- As lead artist: 4
- As featured artist: 13
- Other charted songs: 1

This is the discography of American rapper and record producer Mannie Fresh.

== Albums ==
=== Studio albums ===
List of albums, with selected chart positions
Title	Album details	Peak chart positions		
Title	Album details	US	US R&B	US Rap
The Mind of Mannie Fresh	Released: December 24, 2004; Label: Cash Money, Universal; Format: CD, LP, digital download	47	16	9
Return of the Ballin'	Released: October 27, 2009; Label: Deep, Chubby Boy; Format: CD, digital download	—	—	—
"—" denotes a recording that did not chart or was not released in that territory.

== Singles ==
=== As lead artist ===
List of singles, with selected chart positions, showing year released and album name
Title	Year	Peak chart positions		Album
Title	Year	US	US R&B/HH	Album
"Real Big"	2004	79	33	The Mind of Mannie Fresh
"Conversation" (featuring Tateeze)	2005	—	91	The Mind of Mannie Fresh
"Like a Boss"	2009	—	—	Return of the Ballin'
"Drought"^{[A]} (featuring Rick Ross and Lil Jon)	2009	—	112	Return of the Ballin'
"—" denotes a recording that did not chart or was not released in that territory.

=== As featured artist ===
List of singles, with selected chart positions, showing year released and album name
Title	Year	Peak chart positions			Album
Title	Year	US	US R&B/HH	US Rap	Album
"Back That Azz Up" (Juvenile featuring Lil Wayne and Mannie Fresh)	1999	19	5	9	400 Degreez
"I Got That Fire" (Juvenile featuring Mannie Fresh)	2000	—	62	—	Tha G-Code
"Do That..." (Baby featuring Mannie Fresh, P. Diddy and Tateeze)	2002	33	21	10	Birdman
"Let Me Live" (Tank featuring Jazze Pha and Mannie Fresh)	2002	—	82	—	One Man
"That's Dirty" (Dirty featuring Mr. Blue, Lil Burn One and Mannie Fresh)	2002	—	—	14	Malibu's Most Wanted OST
"Get Something" (Lil Wayne featuring Mannie Fresh)	2003	—	97	—	Non-album single
"In My Life" (Juvenile featuring Mannie Fresh)	2003	46	18	13	Juve the Great
"Bring It Back" (Lil Wayne featuring Mannie Fresh)	2004	—	47	—	Tha Carter
"And Then What" (Young Jeezy featuring Mannie Fresh)	2005	67	14	13	Let's Get It: Thug Motivation 101
"What It Do" (Lil' Flip featuring Mannie Fresh)	2005	—	71	—	I Need Mine
"Move Around" (B.G. featuring Mannie Fresh)	2005	113	52	—	The Heart of tha Streetz, Vol. 2 (I Am What I Am)
"That Girl" (Frankie J featuring Chamillionaire and Mannie Fresh)	2006	43	—	—	Priceless
"Naw Meen" (Baby Boy da Prince featuring Mannie Fresh)	2007	—	119	—	Across the Water
"My Hood" (B.G. featuring Mannie Fresh and Gar)	2009	—	70	—	Too Hood 2 Be Hollywood
"—" denotes a recording that did not chart or was not released in that territory.

== Other charted songs ==
List of songs, with selected chart positions, showing year released and album name
Title	Year	Peak chart positions	Album
Title	Year	US R&B/HH	Album
"Hood Rich" (Blast featuring Mannie Fresh)	2007	116	Unexpected
"Bein Myself" (Lil Wayne featuring Mannie Fresh)	2025	39	Tha Carter VI

== Guest appearances ==
List of non-single guest appearances, with other performing artists, showing year released and album name
Title	Year	Other artist(s)	Album
"Play'n & Laugh'n"	1996	B.G.	Chopper City
"Party"	1998	Juvenile	400 Degrees {2024 Release}
"We Be Blowing Money"	1998	Juvenile	400 Degrees {2024 Release}
"Intro Hot & Spicy"	1999	Hot Boys	Guerilla Warfare
"Drop It Like It's Hot!"	1999	LIl Wayne, B.G.	Tha Block Is Hot
Freak da Hoes	2001	Turk	Young & Thuggin'
One Saturday Night	2001	Turk	Young & Thuggin'
Intro	2001	Turk	Young & Thuggin'
"Believe That"	2002	Lil Wayne	500 Degrees
"Ms. Bird"	2002	Baby	Birdman
"Keeps Spinnin'"	2002	Baby, T.I., Petey Pablo, TQ, Stone	Birdman
"Chi-Town"	2003	Boo & Gotti, Tateeze	Perfect Timing
"The Greatest"	2004	T.I.	Urban Legend
"Hoes"	2004	Lil Wayne	Tha Carter
"This Is the Carter"	2004	Lil Wayne	Tha Carter
"I'm Fresh"	2005	Bun B	Trill
"We Gettin It On"	2005	Birdman	Fast Money
"Come Here Bitch"	2005	Webbie	Savage Life
"Da Club"	2005	Trina	Glamorest Life
"What tha Biz (If I)"	2005	YoungBloodZ	Ev'rybody Know Me
"White Tees"	2005	Jody Breeze	A Day in the Life of Jody Breeze
"Cheat on Yo Man"	2006	Pimp C, Suga	Pimpalation
"Brand New Kicks"	2006	Chingy	Hoodstar
"What It Is"	2006	Tyrese	Alter Ego
"Mr. Feel Good"	2008	Dem Franchize Boyz	Our World, Our Way
"All I Have in This World"	2008	Rick Ross	Trilla
"Almost There"	2008	Blood Raw	My Life: The True Testimony
"Shoe Me Love"	2009	Slim Thug	Boss of All Bosses
"Boom"	2011	Redd Eyez	—N/a
"The Man In My City"	2012	Dee-1, Juvenile	The Focus Tape
"The Very Best"	2012	Dee-1, Mos Def	The Focus Tape
"Move Fast"	2012	Galactic, Mystikal	Carnivale Electricos
"White Girl Party"	2013	Mayalino	Bird Day
"Man In My City"	2013	Turk, Juvenile, Dee-1	Blame It on The System
"Cadillac"	2013	Mayalino, Bun B	—N/a
"94"	2017	Ze11a, Chedda, Bonka	4What4U
"Act Like You Know"	2022	Big Freedia, Galactic, Dee-1	Take Me to the River: New Orleans
"Bein Myself"	2025	Lil Wayne	Tha Carter VI

== See also ==
- Big Tymers discography
- Cash Money Millionaires discography
- Mannie Fresh production discography
