= It's All on U, Vol. 2 =

Studio album by B.G.
- Released: November 11, 1997; June 29, 1999 (re-release)
- Recorded: 1997
- Genres: Gangsta rap, Southern hip hop
- Length: 54:43
- Label: Cash Money
- Producers: Mannie Fresh; Bryan "Baby" Williams (exec.); Ronald "Slim" Williams (exec.)

B.G. chronology
It's All on U, Vol. 1 (1997)	It's All on U, Vol. 2 (1997)	Chopper City in the Ghetto (1999)

Professional ratings
Review scores
Source	Rating
AllMusic	3/5 stars
The Rolling Stone Album Guide	2.5/5 stars

It's All on U, Vol. 2 is the third studio album by American rapper B.G., released on November 11, 1997, on Cash Money Records. All tracks from the album were produced and contributed by Cash Money's in-house producer Mannie Fresh. The album debuted at No. 184 on the Billboard 200 chart, No. 14 on the Billboard Heatseekers Albums chart, and No.20 on the Top R&B Albums chart.

The album was re-released in 1999 when Cash Money signed a pressing and distribution deal with Universal Records in 1998.

== Track listing ==
- All songs produced by Mannie Fresh.

No.	Title	Length
1.	"Don't Hate Me" (featuring Big Tymers)	2:17
2.	"What U Want Do"	4:11
3.	"Get Your Shine On (Remix)" (featuring Big Tymers)	5:49
4.	"Livin' Legend"	4:52
5.	"Hot Boys 226" (featuring Yellaboy, Lil' Ya, Lil Wayne and Juvenile)	4:39
6.	"Ride or Die" (featuring Lil Wayne and Juvenile)	5:21
7.	"Plan Went Sour"	5:00
8.	"Clean Up Man"	4:03
9.	"I'm Try'n" (featuring Lil Wayne and Juvenile)	3:54
10.	"U" All "N"	3:56
11.	"6 Figure" (featuring Hot Boys)	6:07
12.	"Stay n Line Hoe" (featuring Big Tymers)	4:33
Total length:		54:43
