= How You Luv That Vol. 2 =

Studio album by Big Tymer$
- Released: September 22, 1998
- Recorded: February – August 1998
- Genre: Southern hip-hop
- Labels: Cash Money; Universal
- Producers: Mannie Fresh, Bryan “Baby” Williams (Executive Producer), Ronald "Slim" Williams (Executive Producer)

Big Tymer$ chronology
How You Luv That (1998)	How You Luv That Vol. 2 (1998)	I Got That Work (2000)

Singles from How You Luv That Vol. 2
- 1. "Big Ballin" Released: 1998; 2. "Stun'N (Remix)" Released: 1998

Professional ratings
Review scores
Source	Rating
AllMusic	2.4 stars on a 5 point scale
The Source	3.5/5 stars

How You Luv That Vol. 2 is a re-release of the first album by hip hop duo Big Tymer$ released in late 1998. Cash Money re-released How You Luv That as How You Luv That Vol. 2 in late 1998 after signing its distribution deal with Universal Records. This re-release substitutes a remix of "Stun'n" for the original version and adds "Big Ballin'," "Money & Power," and "Drop It Like It's Hot".

The singles are "Big Ballin'" and "Stun'n (Remix)". Mannie Fresh produced the album. The album featured guests Bun B, Lil Wayne, Cadillac, Juvenile, Paparue & B.G. The upper middle of the cover shows B.G. in pre-planned early artwork for his album, Chopper City In The Ghetto, which was released a year later.

== Track listing ==
1. "Big Tymers Intro (Skit)" – 3:08
2. "Playboy (Don't Hate Me)" (featuring Bun B & Lil Wayne) – 4:40
3. "Big Ballin'" (featuring Chilli) – 4:39
4. "Tear It Up" (featuring B.G. & Lil Wayne) – 4:02
5. "Phone Call (Skit)" – 1:25
6. "How You Luv That?" (featuring Juvenile & Lil Wayne) – 4:54
7. "Cutlass, Monte Carlo's & Regals" (featuring Juvenile & Lil Wayne) – 4:45
8. "Money & Power" – 5:11
9. "Millionaire Dream" (featuring Cadillac & Lil Wayne) – 5:23
10. "Beautiful" – 4:07
11. "Ballin'" (featuring Bun B) – 5:08
12. "Drop It Like It's Hot" (featuring Chilli, Juvenile & Cadillac) – 4:00
13. "Top Of Tha Line Nigga" (featuring Lil Wayne) – 4:20
14. "Tell Me" (featuring Lil Wayne) – 3:08
15. "On Top Of The World" (featuring Chilli) – 5:03
16. "Suga & Pac, Puff & Big (6 Fig)" (featuring B.G. & Lil Wayne) – 4:35
17. "How Should I Ride?" (featuring B.G. & Cadillac) – 3:44
18. "Stun'n (Remix)" (featuring Lil Wayne & Paparue) – 4:26
