= Checkmate (B.G. album) =

Studio album by B.G.
- Released: November 21, 2000
- Recorded: 1999–2000
- Studios: Cash Money Studios; Circle House Studios (Miami, FL)
- Genres: Southern hip-hop; gangsta rap
- Length: 1:15:10
- Labels: Cash Money; Universal
- Producer: Mannie Fresh

B.G. chronology
Chopper City in the Ghetto (1999)	Checkmate (2000)	Livin' Legend (2003)

Singles from Checkmate
- 1. "I Know" Released: October 31, 2000; 2. "X & Henne" Released: 2000; 3. "Bounce With Me" Released: May 8, 2001

Professional ratings
Review scores
Source	Rating
AllMusic	3.5/5 stars
Rolling Stone	3/5 stars

Checkmate is the fifth solo studio album by American rapper B.G.. It was released on November 21, 2000 via Cash Money/Universal Records, marking his final release for the label. Recording sessions took place at Cash Money Studios and at Circle House Studios in Miami. Produced by Mannie Fresh, it features guest appearances from the Hot Boys and the Big Tymers. In the United States, the album debuted at number 21 on the Billboard 200 and number 5 on the Top R&B/Hip-Hop Albums charts with over 128,000 copies sold in its first week. It was certified gold by the Recording Industry Association of America on December 19, 2000 for selling 500,000 units in the US alone.

== Track listing ==
No.	Title	Length
1.	"Big Tymers"	2:20
2.	"To My People"	4:29
3.	"Gun Slinger"	4:25
4.	"U Know How We Do" (featuring Lil Wayne)	4:32
5.	"What's That Smell" (featuring Turk)	3:56
6.	"This N____ Die"	4:31
7.	"Change the World" (featuring Hot Boys and Big Tymers)	4:38
8.	"Tyma Talkin'"	0:31
9.	"Hennessy & XTC" (featuring Big Tymers)	4:41
10.	"Tyma Talkin'"	0:51
11.	"Press One"	4:12
12.	"Jungle"	4:37
13.	"I Know" (featuring Lil Wayne)	3:53
14.	"Bounce with Me"	4:54
15.	"Get in Line" (featuring Juvenile)	3:58
16.	"Run with My Chopper"	4:02
17.	"Tyma Talkin'"	0:55
18.	"Problems"	4:59
19.	"Ah Ha ..."	3:52
20.	"He Used 2 Be a Man"	4:54
Total length:		1:15:10

== Personnel ==
- Christopher "B.G." Dorsey – vocals
- Dwayne "Lil' Wayne" Carter, Jr. – vocals
- Tab "Turk" Virgil, Jr. – vocals
- Terius "Juvenile" Gray – vocals
- Bryan "Baby" Williams – vocals, executive producer
- Byron "Mannie Fresh" Thomas – vocals, keyboards, producer, mixing, engineering
- Unplugged – vocals
- Rick "The Man" Marcel – lead bass
- Terrence "Bearwolfe" Williams – keyboards assistant
- Ray Seay – mixing, engineering
- Chris Gehringer – mastering
- Ronald "Slim" Williams – executive producer
- Pen & Pixel Graphics – artwork
- Dino Delvaille – A&R
- Elaine Lee – A&R assistant

== Charts ==
=== Weekly charts ===
Chart (2000)	Peak position
US Billboard 200	21
US Top R&B/Hip-Hop Albums (Billboard)	5

=== Year-end charts ===
Chart (2001)	Position
US Billboard 200 Albums	185
US Top R&B/Hip-Hop Albums (Billboard)	58

== Certifications ==
Region	Certification	Certified units/sales
United States (RIAA)	Gold	500,000^{^}
^{^} Shipments figures based on certification alone.
