= Livin' Legend =

Studio album by B.G.
- Released: February 25, 2003
- Recorded: 2002–2003
- Genre: Gangsta rap; Southern hip hop
- Length: 2:23:46
- Label: Chopper City; Koch
- Producer: Christopher Dorsey (exec.); Carol Dorsey; T. Smooth; K.I.D.D.; Kenoe; DJ Smurf; Clinton Sparks; Beat Doctor

B.G. chronology
Checkmate (2000)	Livin' Legend (2003)	Life After Cash Money (2004)

Singles from Livin' Legend
- 1. "I Keep It Gangsta" Released: 2003; 2. "Hottest of the Hot" Released: 2003

Professional ratings
Review scores
Source	Rating
RapReviews	7/10
Rolling Stone	3/5 stars
Vibe	2.5/5 stars

Livin' Legend is the sixth studio album by American rapper B.G. It was the first album he released under his own imprint Chopper City Records, following his departure from Cash Money Records. The album contains production from Kenoe, K.I.D.D., Clinton Sparks, and Beat Doctor. B.G. also introduces his artists, Gar, Hakizzle and Snipe to the world. "Let It Flow", "Keep It Gangsta", and "Fuck You" were released on vinyl. A music video for "Keep It Gangsta" and "Hottest of the Hot" was released in summer 2003. It is the first B.G. album not to feature any production from Cash Money producer Mannie Fresh.

== Track listing ==
Disc 1
No.	Title	Producer(s)	Length
1.	"F**k U" (Intro)	K.I.D.D.	1:54
2.	"I'm Out Here" (featuring Hakim and Sniper)	K.I.D.D.	4:30
3.	"Clean Up Man, Pt. 2"	K.I.D.D.	2:26
4.	"I Keep It Gangsta"	K.I.D.D.	4:44
5.	"Hottest of the Hot"	K.I.D.D.	4:36
6.	"The Club Scene" (skit)		0:45
7.	"Batt'em Up" (featuring Gar and Redd)	K.I.D.D.	5:20
8.	"Only 4 U" (featuring Wyndi)		4:03
9.	"Real N**gas and Real B*tches"	K.I.D.D.	4:01
10.	"Do What You Do" (featuring Hakim)		4:15
11.	"Let It Flow" (featuring Chopper City Boyz and Wyndi)		4:45
12.	"R.I.P."		4:04
13.	"My Son & Daughter"	K.I.D.D.	4:32
14.	"Just Like That"	K.I.D.D.	4:27
15.	"Duckin' the Law" (featuring Sniper and Hakim)	K.I.D.D.	4:01
16.	"Shoot'em Up & Bang Bang"	Kenoe	5:36
17.	"Reality Check, Pt. 2"	K.I.D.D.	5:54
18.	"Hottest of the Hot" (Beat-N-Azz Remix)		4:01

Disc 2
No.	Title	Producer(s)	Length
1.	"Keep It Real" (featuring Gar)		4:07
2.	"Bling Bling Slim"		3:25
3.	"That's What I Want"		3:54
4.	"F**k That Sh*t"		4:57
5.	"For tha Money" (featuring 7th Ward Soulja)	Beat Doctor	5:04
6.	"Jack Who, Take What?"		3:11
7.	"Thought I Was Gone"		5:17
8.	"Been Doin' This"		4:04
9.	"Catch the Wall" (featuring Hakim and Josephine Johnny)		4:18
10.	"Replacement Killers" (featuring Kenoe and Wood)		4:35
11.	"In the Hood"		2:46
12.	"The Second Line"		4:29
13.	"U Not My Dog" (featuring Soulja Slim)		2:28
14.	"However U Want It" (featuring Gar and Hakim)		4:11
15.	"Throw Your Hands Up" (featuring Hakim)		4:23
16.	"Reality Check, Pt. 1"		4:30
17.	"Hottest of the Hot" (Clinton Sparks Remix)	Clinton Sparks	4:15

== Charts ==
=== Weekly charts ===
Chart (2003)	Peak position
US Billboard 200	21
US Top R&B/Hip-Hop Albums (Billboard)	4

=== Year-end charts ===
Chart (2003)	Position
US Top R&B/Hip-Hop Albums (Billboard)	65
