= UNLV (disambiguation) =

UNLV is the University of Nevada, Las Vegas, a public research university in Paradise, Nevada, U.S.

UNLV may also refer to:

- UNLV Rebels, the intercollegiate athletics teams of the University of Nevada, Las Vegas, U.S.
- U.N.L.V. (group), a hip-hop group from New Orleans, Louisiana, U.S.
