= It's All on U, Vol. 1 =

Studio album by the B.G.
- Released: July 1, 1997; June 29, 1999 (re-release)
- Recorded: 1996–1997
- Genres: Gangsta rap, Southern hip hop
- Length: 58:06
- Label: Cash Money
- Producers: Mannie Fresh; Bryan "Baby" Williams (exec.); Ronald "Slim" Williams (exec.)

The B.G. chronology
Chopper City (1996)	It's All on U, Vol. 1 (1997)	It's All on U, Vol. 2 (1997)

Professional ratings
Review scores
Source	Rating
AllMusic	3/5 stars
The Rolling Stone Album Guide	2/5 stars

It's All on U, Vol. 1 is the second studio album by rapper the B.G., released on July 1, 1997, on Cash Money Records. The album features the first appearance of Hot Boys as a group. All the tracks were produced by Mannie Fresh. The album debuted at No. 17 on the Billboard Heatseekers Albums chart on July 19, 1997.

This album was re-released in 1999 after Cash Money signed a pressing and distribution deal with Universal in 1998.

== Track listing ==
- All songs produced by Mannie Fresh.

No.	Title	Length
1.	"187 Big Tymers" (featuring Big Tymers)	1:25
2.	"Get Your Shine On!!" (featuring Big Tymers)	6:37
3.	"N My City"	5:08
4.	"Silent B.G."	3:57
5.	"Round My Way" (featuring Juvenile)	4:02
6.	"Uptown Thang (Remix Hot)"	3:52
7.	"Ride 2'Night" (featuring Hot Boys (Lil Wayne/Bulletproof/Keisha) and Turk)	4:44
8.	"I Be Thinking"	4:35
9.	"Cash Money Niggaz" (featuring Big Tymers, Turk and Bulletproof)	4:49
10.	"F*** Theze Hoez"	5:06
11.	"Let's Get Funky" (featuring Lil Wayne)	5:04
12.	"Gangsta Sh*t!!"	4:33
13.	"Retaliation (Remix)" (featuring Juvenile, Bun B and Ms. Tee)	6:04
Total length:		58:06
