= Bling Bling (song) =

1999 single by B.G.

Single by B.G. featuring Hot Boys and Big Tymers

from the album Chopper City in the Ghetto
- Released: March 13, 1999
- Recorded: 1998
- Genre: Southern hip hop
- Length: 5:12 (album version); 3:52 (radio edit)
- Label: Cash Money; Universal
- Songwriters: Christopher Dorsey; Dwayne Carter; Terius Gray; Tab Virgil Jr.; Bryan Williams; Byron Thomas
- Producer: Mannie Fresh

B.G. singles chronology
"Bling Bling" (1999)	"Top Back" (2006)

Lil Wayne singles chronology
"Bling Bling" (1999)	"Back That Azz Up" (1999)

"Bling Bling" is a song by New Orleans rapper B.G., released by Cash Money and Universal Records on March 13, 1999 as both his debut single and the lead single for his fourth studio album, Chopper City in the Ghetto (1999). It features Cash Money labelmates Hot Boys and Big Tymers.

"Bling Bling" peaked at number 36 on the Billboard Hot 100 and yielded B.G.'s furthest commercial success as a solo artist.

== Critical reception ==
In 2013, Complex added the song in its list of nineteen great songs made by teenage rappers in the last 19 years. Complex editor Kyle Kramer said "Featuring carefree money boasts over a spry Mannie Fresh beat, the song still sounds relevant today in the Young Money era, proving the staying power of both diamonds and youth."

== Charts ==
Chart (1999)	Peak position
US Billboard Hot 100	36
US Hot R&B/Hip-Hop Songs (Billboard)	13
US Hot Rap Songs (Billboard)	10
US Rhythmic Airplay (Billboard)	11
