= How You Luv That =

Studio album by Big Tymer$
- Released: 1997 • March 1998 (re-release)
- Recorded: 1997, Cash Money Studios
- Genres: Southern hip-hop; bounce
- Label: Cash Money
- Producers: Mannie Fresh; Bryan "Baby" Williams; (exec.); Ronald "Slim" Williams (exec.)

Big Tymer$ chronology
How You Luv That (1997)	How You Luv That Vol. 2 (1998)

Professional ratings
Review scores
Source	Rating
AllMusic	2/5 stars
The Rolling Stone Album Guide	2/5 stars

How You Luv That is the debut studio album by New Orleans hip-hop duo Big Tymer$, released independently in 1997 on Cash Money Records. The album sold over 100,000 copies without the benefit of major radio or video airplay.

Cash Money re-released How You Luv That as How You Luv That Vol. 2 in late 1998 after signing its distribution deal with Universal Records. The re-release substitutes a remix of "Stun'n" for the original version and adds "Big Ballin'," "Money & Power," and "Drop It Like It's Hot".

== Tracklist ==
1. "Intro" (feat. Bulletproof & Lil Wayne) - 3:08
2. "Playboy (Don't Hate Me)" (feat. Bun B & Lil Wayne) - 4:40
3. "Stun'n" - 5:22
4. "Tear It Up" (feat. B.G. & Lil Wayne) - 4:02
5. "Phone Call (Skit)" - 1:24
6. "How You Luv That?" (feat. Juvenile & Lil Wayne) - 4:54
7. "Cutlass, Monte Carlo's & Regals" (feat. Juvenile & Lil Wayne) - 4:45
8. "Millionaire Dream" (feat. Cadillac & Lil Wayne) - 5:23
9. "Beautiful" - 4:07
10. "Ballin'" (feat. Bun B) - 5:08
11. "Top Of Tha Line Nigga" (feat. Lil Wayne) - 4:20
12. "Suga & Pac, Puff & Big" (feat. B.G. & Lil Wayne) - 4:35
13. "Preppy Pimp" - 5:03
14. "Broads" (feat. Lil Wayne) - 4:35
15. "Try'n 2 Make A Million" (feat. Juvenile) - 3:44
16. "Drivin' Em" (feat. Larell & Lil Wayne) - 4:45
17. "Outro" (feat. Bun B) - 4:26

== Personnel ==
- Barewolf: Keyboards
- Corey Funky Fingers: Guitars, Bass

== Production ==
- Produced and Mixed by Mannie Fresh
- Recorded by Mannie Fresh, Barewolf and Corey Funky Fingers
- All Songs Published by B/M7 & Money Mack Music

== Chart positions ==
Chart (1998)	Peak position
U.S. Billboard 200	168
U.S. Billboard Top R&B/Hip-Hop Albums	25
U.S. Billboard Top Heatseekers	8
