= Life After Cash Money =

- Digital cover

Studio album by B.G.
- Released: July 27, 2004
- Genre: Southern hip-hop; gangsta rap
- Length: 1:16:24
- Label: Chopper City; Koch
- Producer: Bass Heavy; C-Los Beats; Crack Tracks; Dani Kartel; DJ Smurf; DJ Speedy; G'sta; Hush; Jean Perkins; Jeffery Johns; K.I.D.D.; KLC; Sinista

B.G. chronology
Livin' Legend (2003)	Life After Cash Money (2004)	The Heart of tha Streetz, Vol. 1 (2005)

Professional ratings
Review scores
Source	Rating
AllMusic	3.5/5 stars
RapReviews	6/10
Rolling Stone	3/5 stars

Life After Cash Money is the seventh solo studio album by American rapper B.G. a.k.a. B. Gizzle. It was released on July 27, 2004, through Chopper City/Koch Records. Production was handled by Dani Kartel, Hush, KLC, Bass Heavy, C-Los Beats, Crack Tracks, DJ Smurf, DJ Speedy, G'sta, Jean Perkins, Jeffery Johns, K.I.D.D. and Sinista. It features guest appearances from his Chopper City Boyz group members Gar, Hakizzle and Sniper, Ying Yang Twins, Ziggler The Wiggler, 6 Shot, Big Gipp, Conrad, Reel, T.I. and the late Soulja Slim.

The album debuted at number 22 on the Billboard 200 and peaked at number 2 on both the Top R&B/Hip-Hop Albums and the Independent Albums charts in the United States.

== Track listing ==
No.	Title	Lyrics	Music	Length
1.	"Intro (feat. Ziggler the Wiggler)"	Christopher Noel Dorsey; Michael Dobard	Andreas Stasinopoulos	2:56
2.	"Geezy Where U Been (feat. Ziggler the Wiggler)"	C. Dorsey; Dobard	L. Parker	4:06
3.	"My Life"	C. Dorsey	Stasinopoulos	5:16
4.	"My World "I Want It""	C. Dorsey	Michael Crooms	4:09
5.	"Don't Talk to Me"	C. Dorsey; Craig Lawson	Craig Lawson	5:08
6.	"Walk With Me (feat. Gar)"	C. Dorsey; Vandell Smith	Daniel Castillo	3:26
7.	"Get Wild With It (feat. Ying Yang Twinz)"	C. Dorsey; Eric Jackson; Deongelo Holmes	Terrence Anthony Freeman	3:16
8.	"Factory (Hakim, Gar & Sniper)"	C. Dorsey; Hakim Dorsey; Smith; Travis Edwards	Roderick Tillman	4:54
9.	"Do What You Wanna Do (feat. 6 Shot & Big Gipp)"	C. Dorsey; Jermaine Tucker; Cameron Gipp	Lawson	4:01
10.	"Right Now"	C. Dorsey	Carlos Stephens	3:55
11.	"Street Nigga (feat. T.I.)"	C. Dorsey; Clifford Harris	Stasinopoulos	5:04
12.	"Rollin' in My Cadillac"	C. Dorsey; Jackson; Holmes	Harvey Miller	4:13
13.	"I Wanna Fuck (feat. Hakim, Gar, Sniper & Conrad)"	C. Dorsey; H. Dorsey; Smith; Edwards; Conrad St. Julien	G-Sta	5:10
14.	"Don't Wanna Be With Out U (feat. Gar & Reel)"	C. Dorsey; Smith; Reel	Jean Perkins; Jeffery Johns	5:17
15.	"Like That (feat. Soulja Slim)"	C. Dorsey; James Tapp	Castillo	3:30
16.	"Hold That Thought"	C. Dorsey	Willie Reed Jr.	3:44
17.	"Doing My Thang"	C. Dorsey	Castillo	3:43
18.	"Bust a Move (feat. Gar)"	C. Dorsey; Smith	Castillo	4:36
Total length:				1:16:24

== Personnel ==
- Christopher "B.G." Dorsey – main artist, executive producer
- Michael "Ziggler The Wiggler" Dobard – featured artist (tracks: 1, 2)
- Vandell "Gar" Smith – featured artist (tracks: 6, 8, 13, 14, 18)
- Eric "Kaine" Jackson – featured artist (track 7)
- Deongelo "D-Roc" Holmes – featured artist (track 7)
- Hakim "Hakizzle" Dorsey – featured artist (tracks: 8, 13)
- Travis "Sniper" Edwards – featured artist (tracks: 8, 13)
- Jermaine "Six Shot" Tucker – featured artist (track 9)
- Cameron "Big Gipp" Gipp – featured artist (track 9)
- Clifford "T.I." Harris Jr. – featured artist (track 11)
- Conrad St. Julien – featured artist (track 13)
- Reel – featured artist (track 14)
- James "Soulja Slim" Tapp – featured artist (track 15)
- Nat Hughes – percussions (tracks: 3, 13)
- Andreas "Hush" Stasinopoulos – producer (tracks: 1, 3, 11)
- L. "Crack Tracks" Parker – producer (track 2)
- Michael "DJ Smurf" Crooms – producer (track 4)
- Craig "KLC" Lawson – producer & mixing (tracks: 5, 9)
- Daniel "Dani Kartel" Castillo – producer (tracks: 6, 15, 17, 18)
- Terrence "Sinista" Freeman – producer (track 7)
- Roderick "Bass Heavy" Tillman – producer (track 8), mixing (tracks: 2, )
- Carlos "C-Los Beats" Stephens – producer & mixing (track 10)
- Harvey "DJ Speedy" Miller – producer (track 12)
- G-Sta – producer (track 13)
- Jean Perkins – producer (track 14)
- Jeffery Johns – producer (track 14)
- Willie "K.I.D.D." Reed Jr. – producer (track 16)
- Quentin Dennard – mixing (tracks: 1, 6, 11)
- The Zone – mixing (track 4)
- Carlos "Whudini" Fobbs – artwork, design, layout

== Charts ==
=== Weekly charts ===
Chart (2004)	Peak position
US Billboard 200	22
US Top R&B/Hip-Hop Albums (Billboard)	2
US Independent Albums (Billboard)	2

=== Year-end charts ===
Chart (2004)	Position
US Top R&B/Hip-Hop Albums (Billboard)	83
US Independent Albums (Billboard)	19
