= Back That Azz Up =

1999 single by Juvenile

Single by Juvenile featuring Mannie Fresh and Lil Wayne

from the album 400 Degreez
- Released: June 11, 1999
- Recorded: 1998
- Genre: Dirty rap; bounce
- Length: 4:24
- Label: Cash Money; Universal
- Songwriters: Terius Gray; Dwayne Carter; Byron Thomas
- Producer: Mannie Fresh

Juvenile singles chronology
"Down Bottom" (1999)	"Back That Azz Up" (1999)	"U Understand" (1999)

Lil Wayne singles chronology
"Bling Bling" (1999)	"Back That Azz Up" (1999)	"Tha Block Is Hot" (1999)

Mannie Fresh singles chronology
"Back That Azz Up" (1999)	"I Got That Fire" (2000)

Music Video
- "Back That Thang Up" on YouTube

Audio
- "Back That Azz Up" on YouTube
- "Back That Thang Up" on YouTube

"Back That Azz Up", also known as "Back That Thang Up" for a radio edit, is a song recorded by American rapper Juvenile featuring fellow American rappers Mannie Fresh and Lil Wayne. Produced by Fresh, it was released on June 11, 1999, as the second single from Juvenile's 1998 album 400 Degreez. The song was Juvenile's biggest hit single at the time until the chart-topping "Slow Motion" in 2004, surpassing "Back That Azz Up" which peaked at number 19 on the Billboard Hot 100.

Both the song and its music video were omnipresent in media venues for much of 1999 and early 2000. "Back That Azz Up", Lil Wayne's "Tha Block Is Hot", and B.G.'s "Bling Bling" were the three hits that launched Cash Money into the pop mainstream.

The song played a pivotal role in introducing bounce music—a distinctive New Orleans style of hip-hop characterized by rapid beats and call-and-response vocals—into mainstream culture, thereby solidifying the South as an epicenter of hip-hop. It has achieved lasting cultural significance, frequently sampled by artists like Drake and Beyoncé, and remains popular at cultural events and celebrations.

== Production ==
Initially skeptical of its success, Juvenile stated that he developed the hook for "Back That Azz Up" about half a year before finishing the 400 Degreez album. Mannie Fresh was impressed upon hearing the lyrics and began producing a beat that he thought would fit the lyrics. Fresh's production featured a distinctive bounce beat, reminiscent of New Orleans' music scene, as noted by Dino Delvaille, then an A&R executive for Universal Music.

During their Nashville recording session, Juvenile recalled the urgency of completing the song. Lil Wayne, present in the studio, insisted on contributing a New Orleans chant to the end of the song, which they incorporated into the final version. Based on the content of the song, there were three edited versions of the song, which allowed for radio stations to choose between playing "Back That Thang Up" and the edited version of "Back That Azz Up". Johnny Kenaya was in the studio with Juvenile and Mannie Fresh while the record was playing. He gave the green light on the project to go on. The former had redone amended lyrics, while the latter was edited as is (with the word "ass" left intact). Also, the edited album version had "ass" backmasked along with other expletives. "Back That Thang Up" only came out on the single, the compilation Universal Smash Hits in 2000, and Juvenile's Greatest Hits in 2004.

== Reception ==
Allmusic critic Jason Birchmeier named "Back That Azz Up" among "the best songs to come out of the late-'90s Dirty South boom."

Complex has included "Back That Azz Up" in some best-of lists, ranking it no. 4 among the "50 best New Orleans rap songs" in 2011 and including it in its 2022 list "32 Best Twerking Anthems". In 2021, Rolling Stone ranked the song no. 478 in its list "Top 500 Best Songs of All Time".

== Live performances ==
In February 2020, Juvenile performed "Back That Azz Up" with billionaire businessman Tom Steyer at Allen University in Columbia, South Carolina during Steyer's Democratic Party presidential primary campaign. While Juvenile performed the lyrics, Steyer danced onstage alongside his wife and daughter before delivering a speech targeted to youth and minority voters. Steyer withdrew from the presidential race the day after the performance in part due to a weak showing in that state's primary.

== Court ruling ==
In Positive Black Talk, Inc. v. Cash Money Records, Inc. (2004), the United States Court of Appeals for the Fifth Circuit concluded that the song did not infringe the copyright of DJ Jubilee's song "Back That Ass Up".

== Remix ==
In 2021, Juvenile released "Vax That Thang Up", a remix whose lyrics encouraged vaccination for COVID-19. The song, also featuring Mannie Fresh and Mia X, was sponsored by Match Group's dating app BLK. "Vax That Thang Up" was released to mixed reactions. Juvenile responded to critics by claiming that his goal was not to force listeners to receive the vaccine, but instead that they "get educated on it, and make the right decision".

== In popular culture ==
- The song was used in the episode "Career Day" in the television series Abbott Elementary

== Charts ==
=== Weekly charts ===
Chart (1999)	Peak position
US Billboard Hot 100	19
US Hot R&B/Hip-Hop Songs (Billboard)	5
US Hot Rap Songs (Billboard)	9

=== Year-end charts ===
Chart (1999)	Position
U.S. Billboard Hot 100	75

== Certifications ==
Region	Certification	Certified units/sales
United States (RIAA)	3× Platinum	3,000,000^{‡}
^{‡} Sales+streaming figures based on certification alone.
