= Chopper City in the Ghetto =

Chopper City In The Ghetto

Studio album by B.G.
- Released: April 20, 1999
- Genre: Hip hop
- Length: 1:07:09
- Labels: Cash Money; Universal
- Producers: Mannie Fresh; Bryan "Baby" Williams (exec.); Ronald "Slim" Williams (exec.)

B.G. chronology
It's All on U, Vol. 2 (1997)	Chopper City In The Ghetto (1999)	Checkmate (2000)

Singles from Chopper City in the Ghetto
- 1. "Bling Bling" Released: March 30, 1999; 2. "Cash Money Is An Army" Released: 1999

Chopper City in the Ghetto is the fourth studio album by American rapper B.G. released April 20, 1999, on Cash Money Records and Universal. It spawned the top 40 hit "Bling Bling". The album contains production by Mannie Fresh and appearances by Baby, Big Tymers, Lil Wayne and Juvenile.

== Commercial performance ==
It debuted at number 9 on the Billboard 200 for first week sales of over 140,000 copies, and was certified platinum by the Recording Industry Association of America on December 23, 1999, with over one million copies sold in the United States, making it B.G.'s best-selling album of his solo career. The album has sold over 1.8 million copies in the United States.

== Critical reception ==
Professional ratings
Review scores
Source	Rating
AllMusic	4/5 stars
Christgau's Consumer Guide	(choice cut)
The Encyclopedia of Popular Music	3/5 stars
The Rolling Stone Album Guide	3.5/5 stars
The Source	3.5/5 stars
Spin	7/10

Chopper City in the Ghetto received positive reviews from music critics. Jason Birchmeier of AllMusic named it one of the best Cash Money Records albums. The Source's Eric Robinson called it a "display of [B.G.'s] continuous growth and versatility". He commended the album's producer Mannie Fresh, calling him "the new millennial trendsetter" who is "concocting Star Wars-meets-Beat Street rhythms". Tony Green of Spin wrote: "The Cash Money clique doesn't offer a new spin on the floss'n'shine routine, they just take it so far over the top." Rolling Stone, in their 2004 Album Guide, called Chopper City in the Ghetto a "phenomenal success", as well as B.G.'s best work. In 2025, Pitchfork placed it at number 55 on their list of the "100 Best Rap Albums of All Time".

== Track listing ==
No.	Title	Length
1.	"Intro (feat. Big Tymers)"	1:52
2.	"Trigga Play"	4:08
3.	"Cash Money Is an Army"	3:46
4.	"Play'n It Raw (feat. Hot Boys)"	4:30
5.	"With tha B.G. (feat. Big Tymers)"	3:40
6.	"Made Man (feat. Baby)"	4:39
7.	"Bling Bling (feat. Big Tymers & Hot Boys)"	5:12
8.	"Knockout (feat. Turk and Juvenile)"	3:24
9.	"Real Niggaz"	4:22
10.	"Dog Ass (feat. Juvenile)"	3:53
11.	"Cash Money Roll (feat. Baby)"	5:15
12.	"Niggaz in Trouble (feat. Lil Wayne and Juvenile)"	5:35
13.	"Thug'n"	4:32
14.	"Hard Times"	4:05
15.	"Uptown My Home"	3:50
16.	"Bout My Paper"	4:15

== Charts ==
=== Weekly charts ===
Chart (1999)	Peak position
US Billboard 200	9
US Top R&B/Hip-Hop Albums (Billboard)	2

=== Year-end charts ===
Chart (1999)	Position
US Billboard 200	115
US Top R&B/Hip-Hop Albums (Billboard)	29

== Certifications ==
Region	Certification	Certified units/sales
United States (RIAA)	Platinum	1,000,000^{^}
^{^} Shipments figures based on certification alone.
