= The Heart of tha Streetz, Vol. 1 =

Studio album by B.G.
- Released: May 24, 2005
- Recorded: 2004–2005
- Genre: Southern hip hop, gangsta rap
- Length: 64:02
- Label: Koch, Chopper City
- Producer: Bass Heavy; B.G.; Dani Kartel; Howard Metoyer; Hush; Jevor; K.I.D.D.; KLC; Mouse; Mr. Collipark; Sinista

B.G. chronology
| Life After Cash Money (2004) | The Heart of tha Streetz, Vol. 1 (2005) | The Heart of tha Streetz, Vol. 2 (I Am What I Am) (2006) |

Professional ratings
Review scores
| Source | Rating |
|---|---|
| AllHipHop | 3/5 stars |
| AllMusic | 3/5 stars |
| PopMatters | 6/10 |
| RapReviews | 6/10 |

The Heart of tha Streetz, Vol. 1 is the eighth solo studio album by American rapper B.G. It was released on May 24, 2005, via Koch Records, making it his third album for the label.

The album was produced by Bass Heavy, Dani Kartel, Howard Metoyer, Hush, K.I.D.D., Mouse, Jevor, KLC, Mr. Collipark, Sinista, and B.G., who also served as executive producer with Carol A. Dorsey.

It features guest appearances from Gar, Hakizzle, Sniper, Ziggler the Wiggler, 5th Ward Weebie, Homebwoi and VL Mike.

The album debuted at number 21 on the Billboard 200 and number 6 on the Top R&B/Hip-Hop Albums chart in the United States. It was supported with two promotional singles: "Where Da At", which peaked at No. 65 on the Hot R&B/Hip-Hop Songs chart, and "Fool with It".

== Track listing ==
The Heart of tha Streetz, Vol. 1 track listing
| No. | Title | Lyrics | Producer(s) | Length |
|---|---|---|---|---|
| 1. | "Heart of tha Streetz" (featuring Ziggler the Wiggler) | Christopher Noel Dorsey; Michael Dobard | Bass Heavy; B.G. | 3:59 |
| 2. | "Fool with It" | C. Dorsey | Mouse | 3:42 |
| 3. | "Chopper City" (featuring Sniper) | C. Dorsey; Travis Edwards | Howard Metoyer | 3:25 |
| 4. | "Skit" | | | 0:21 |
| 5. | "Where da At" (featuring Homebwoi) | C. Dorsey; James Wesley Maddox | Mr. Collipark; Jevor | 4:14 |
| 6. | "Same Ol' Shit" (featuring Chopper City Boyz) | C. Dorsey; Hakim Abdul Dorsey; Vandell Smith; Edwards | Bass Heavy | 5:26 |
| 7. | "Do That Shit" | C. Dorsey | Dani Kartel | 3:44 |
| 8. | "Work Dat Ass" (featuring 5th Ward Weebie) | C. Dorsey; Jerome Henry Cosey | Sinister | 3:49 |
| 9. | "Ride with That" | C. Dorsey | Dani Kartel | 4:01 |
| 10. | "Get Ya Game Up" | C. Dorsey | Mouse | 4:02 |
| 11. | "U See Why" (featuring Gar) | C. Dorsey; Smith | Howard Metoyer | 4:29 |
| 12. | "Get Up" | C. Dorsey | KLC | 3:53 |
| 13. | "Skit" (featuring Ziggler The Wiggler) | | | 1:41 |
| 14. | "Stalkin'" (featuring Gar) | C. Dorsey; Smith | Hush | 4:44 |
| 15. | "Roll with Me" | C. Dorsey | K.I.D.D. | 4:06 |
| 16. | "Oh No" (featuring Hakizzle) | C. Dorsey; H. Dorsey | Bass Heavy | 3:56 |
| 17. | "On tha Block" | C. Dorsey | Hush | 4:30 |
| Total length: | | | | 1:04:02 |

== Personnel ==
- Christopher "B.G." Dorsey – vocals, producer (track 1), executive producer
- Michael "Ziggler The Wiggler" Dobard – vocals (tracks 1 and 13)
- Travis "Sniper" Edwards – vocals (tracks 3 and 6)
- James Wesley "Homebwoi" Maddox Jr. – vocals (track 5)
- Hakim "Hakizzle" Dorsey – vocals (tracks 6 and 16)
- Vandell "Gar" Smith – vocals (tracks 6, 11 and 14)
- Michael "VL Mike" Allen – vocals (track 6)
- Jerome Henry "5th Ward Weebie" Cosey – vocals (track 8)
- Willie "K.I.D.D." Reed Jr. – producer and engineering (tracks 1 and 15)
- Jeremy "Mouse" Allen – producer (tracks 2 and 10)
- Howard C. Metoyer – producer (tracks 3 and 11)
- Michael "Mr. Collipark" Crooms – producer and engineering (track 5)
- Jevor Campbell – producer (track 5)
- Roderick "Bass Heavy" Tillman – producer (tracks 6 and 16), mixing (tracks 2, 3, 6–11, 14, 16 and 17)
- Daniel "Dani Kartel" Castillo – producer (tracks 7 and 9)
- Terrence "Sinista" Freeman – producer (track 8)
- Craig S. "KLC" Lawson – producer and mixing (track 12)
- Andreas "Hush" Stasinopoulos – producer (tracks 14 and 17)
- Ryan Hyland – mixing (tracks 1 and 15)
- Ray Seay – mixing (track 5)
- William "Billy Hume" Whedbee – additional mixing (track 5)
- Mark Hewitt – mixing assistant (tracks 2, 3, 6–11, 14, 16 and 17)
- Jamaal "Maal the Pimp" Hicks – engineering (tracks 2, 3, 8, 10, 11, 14, 16 and 17)
- Joel Mullis – engineering and editing (track 5)
- Conrad St. Julien – ProTools engineering and editing (tracks 14 and 17)
- Carol A. Dorsey – executive producer

== Charts ==
Chart performance for The Heart of tha Streetz, Vol. 1
| Chart (2005) | Peak position |
|---|---|
| US Billboard 200 | 21 |
| US Top R&B/Hip-Hop Albums (Billboard) | 6 |
