= The Heart of tha Streetz, Vol. 2 (I Am What I Am) =

Studio album by B.G.
- Released: March 21, 2006
- Recorded: 2005–2006
- Genres: Gangsta rap, Southern hip hop
- Length: 1:07:55
- Labels: Chopper City, Koch
- Producers: Mannie Fresh, Mouse On Tha Track, Bass Heavy, Tone Tone, Crack Tracks, Hush, Howard, Coree Benton

B.G. chronology
The Heart of tha Streetz, Vol. 1 (2005)	The Heart of tha Streetz, Vol. 2 (I Am What I Am) (2006)	Too Hood 2 Be Hollywood (2009)

Singles from The Heart of tha Streetz, Vol. 2 (I Am What I Am)
- 1. "Move Around" Released: 2006; 2. "Real N*gga" Released: 2006

Professional ratings
Review scores
Source	Rating
AllMusic	3/5 stars
RapReviews	6/10
Stylus Magazine	B−

The Heart of tha Streetz, Vol. 2 (I Am What I Am) is the ninth studio album by rapper B.G., released on March 21, 2006, on Koch Records. The first single from the album, "Move Around", features former Cash Money Records artist/producer Mannie Fresh. Paul Wall, Webbie, and the Chopper City Boyz appear on this album. The album debuted at No. 6 on the Billboard 200, with over 62,000 copies sold in the first week released.

== Track listing ==
No.	Title	Producer(s)	Length
1.	"Intro"	Hush	2:02
2.	"Real N*gga"	Coree Benton	3:08
3.	"Move Around" (feat. Mannie Fresh)	Mannie Fresh	4:48
4.	"What I Need" (feat. Conrad)	Coree Benton	3:22
5.	"Get Yo Mind Right" (feat. Evelyn)	Bass Heavy	3:31
6.	"Living Right" (feat. Tone Tone)	Tone Tone	4:48
7.	"Kill or Be Killed"	Crack Tracks	4:09
8.	"Deuces Up" (feat. Paul Wall and Yung Redd)	Pretty Todd	3:56
9.	"Bout Mine" (feat. Bossman and VL Mike)	Coree Benton	3:35
10.	"F**k Em" (feat. The Show)	Crack Tracks	4:00
11.	"Ain't No B*tch" (feat. Webbie and VL Mike)	Mouse On Tha Track	3:51
12.	"Yeah N*gga Yeah" (feat. Hakim)	Coree Benton	3:32
13.	"I Ain't Got Nothing"	Crack Tracks	4:16
14.	"P***y Pop" (feat. Sniper and Gar)	Bass Heavy	3:14
15.	"Face Up" (feat. Gar)	Howard	2:50
16.	"It Don't Stop" (feat. Hakim and Bossman)	Coree Benton	4:14
17.	"Gotta Get Me"	Bass Heavy	3:59
18.	"Whatever U Like" (feat. Gar)	Bass Heavy	4:40

== Charts ==
=== Weekly charts ===
Chart (2006)	Peak position
US Billboard 200	6
US Top R&B/Hip-Hop Albums (Billboard)	2

=== Year-end charts ===
Chart (2006)	Position
US Top R&B/Hip-Hop Albums (Billboard)	74
