= Real Big =

2004 single by Mannie Fresh

Single by Mannie Fresh

from the album The Mind of Mannie Fresh
- Released: 2004
- Length: 3:55 (single version); 3:48 (album version)
- Label: Cash Money; Universal
- Songwriter: Byron Thomas
- Producer: Mannie Fresh

Mannie Fresh singles chronology
"In My Life" (2003)	"Real Big" (2004)	"Bring It Back" (2004)

Music video
- "Real Big" on YouTube

"Real Big" is the debut solo single by American rapper/producer Mannie Fresh and the lead single from his debut studio album The Mind of Mannie Fresh (2004). It was written and produced by himself.

The song is featured in the soundtrack and is the main theme of the video game Midnight Club 3: Dub Edition.

== Critical reception ==
In a review of The Mind of Mannie Fresh, David Jeffries of AllMusic described the song some of the straight-ahead party pleasers with impact and grooves that stand up to any other chart-topping crunk Steve "Flash" Juon of RapReviews mentioned the song among the album's "certified bangers". Matt Cibula of PopMatters described it as smooth and "shiny and pimped-out".

== Charts ==
Chart (2004)	Peak position
US Billboard Hot 100	79
US Hot R&B/Hip-Hop Songs (Billboard)	33
