= Too Hood 2 Be Hollywood =

Studio album by B.G.
- Released: December 8, 2009
- Recorded: 2007–2009
- Genre: Southern hip hop
- Length: 1:08:26
- Label: Chopper City; Atlantic; E1
- Producer: Bass Heavy; Cool & Dre; Dupree; Joe Lindsay; KLC; Mannie Fresh; Mista Raja; Oddz N Endz; Savage; Sef Millz; Sir Stephen Beaux; J.U.S.T.I.C.E. League; Scott Storch; Adrian Watts; Ceasar Productions; Crack Tracks

B.G. chronology
Life in the Concrete Jungle (2008)	Too Hood 2 Be Hollywood (2009)

Singles from Too Hood 2 Be Hollywood
- 1. "For a Minute" Released: November 20, 2007; 2. "Ya Heard Me" Released: July 10, 2008; 3. "My Hood" Released: October 27, 2009

Professional ratings
Review scores
Source	Rating
AllMusic	3.5/5 stars
HipHopDX	2.5/5
RapReviews	6.5/10
XXL	3/5 (L)

Too Hood 2 Be Hollywood is the tenth and most recent solo studio album by American rapper BG. After numerous push backs, it was released on December 8, 2009, through Chopper City/Atlantic Records with distribution via E1 Entertainment.

The album was produced by Savage, Bass Heavy, KLC, Mannie Fresh, Oddz N Endz, Cool & Dre, Dupree, Joe Lindsay, Mista Raja, Sef Millz, Sir Stephen Beaux, J.U.S.T.I.C.E. League, and Scott Storch, with Ceasar Productions, Adrian Watts and Crack Tracks producing bonus tracks.

It features guest appearances from Gar, Magnolia Chop, Soulja Slim, Boosie Badazz, C-Murder, Mannie Fresh, Matravious Cooks, Trey Songz, T.I., and former Hot Boys members Juvenile and Lil' Wayne.

In the United States, the album debuted at number 77 on the Billboard 200, number 14 on the Top R&B/Hip-Hop Albums and number 6 on the Top Rap Albums charts. It was supported with two singles: "For a Minute" and "My Hood", with the latter peaked at No. 70 on the US Hot R&B/Hip-Hop Songs chart.

== Background ==
B.G. explained his personal development along with boasting his ability "to make a classic album", in which he stated the following:

My style has changed and I've grown as a person. I was real open-minded when I made this record. I've got one of the best A&R [reps] in the business, Jean Nelson, and we've come up with a vision to make a classic album that's going to go down in the hall of fame. He was planning on joining with Nelly on a tour.

B.G. blamed 50 Cent for missing Young Buck collaboration. In addition to speaking on Buck's verse being taken off "Nigga Owe Me Some Money", B.G. also responded to hearing his name mentioned in 50 Cent's song "So Disrespectful" off of his 2009 album Before I Self Destruct:

"50 Cent didn't want to clear him for the record", he revealed in an interview. "50 Cent has been hating on him all away around the board. 50 has been hating on him. 50 Cent didn't want to clear him for the record. I thought ["So Disrespectful"] was funny. I mean I thought it was funny, but I didn't find it funny. He could have used something else. If your gonna' play with Buck, play with Buck, but don't play with me because he doesn't even know me like that.

== Track listing ==
No.	Title	Writer(s)	Producer(s)	Length
1.	"Fuck the Game Up"	Christopher Dorsey	Mista Raja; Sef Millz	2:14
2.	"I Swar" (featuring Gar)	Dorsey; Vandell Smith	Sir Stephen Beaux	5:15
3.	"Nigga Owe Me Some Money" (featuring Soulja Slim, Lil' Boosie and C-Murder)	Dorsey; James Tapp; Torence Hatch; Corey Miller	KLC	4:13
4.	"Fucking U Right"	Dorsey	Bass Heavy	3:23
5.	"My Hood" (featuring Gar and Mannie Fresh)	Dorsey; Byron Thomas	Mannie Fresh	3:58
6.	"Hit the Block & Roll"	Dorsey	KLC	4:03
7.	"Like Yeah"	Dorsey	Savage	4:09
8.	"Fuck Thang" (featuring MaTravious Cooks)	Dorsey; Chris LeDay	Savage	4:09
9.	"Back to the Money" (featuring Magnolia Chop)	Dorsey; Joseph Pellegrini	Odds And Ends	4:23
10.	"Ya Heard Me" (featuring Lil' Wayne, Juvenile and Trey Songz)	Dorsey; Dwayne Carter; Terius Gray; Faheem Najm	Cool & Dre	4:37
11.	"Chopper City Is an Army"	Dorsey	Mannie Fresh	3:59
12.	"My Wrist Game Is Sick!"	Dorsey	Savage	3:18
13.	"Gutta Gutta" (featuring Gar)	Dorsey; Smith	Dupree; Joe Lindsay	4:16
14.	"Keep It 100" (featuring Magnolia Chop)	Dorsey; Pellegrini	Odds And Ends	4:20
15.	"Under Surveillance"	Dorsey	Bass Heavy	4:40

Bonus tracks
No.	Title	Writer(s)	Producer(s)	Length
16.	"4 a Minute" (featuring T.I.)	Dorsey; Clifford Harris	Scott Storch	4:00
17.	"I Hustle"	Dorsey; Jay Jenkins	J.U.S.T.I.C.E. League	3:29
Total length:				1:08:26

Best Buy exclusive bonus tracks
No.	Title	Producer(s)	Length
18.	"Off the Block" (featuring Gar)	Adrian "AD" Watts
19.	"Murder Show" (featuring Soulja Slim)	Crack Tracks
20.	"Closer"	Ceasar Productions
21.	"So 504" (featuring Gar)	Ceasar Productions

== Personnel ==
- Christopher "B.G." Dorsey – vocals, executive producer
- Vandell "Gar" Smith – vocals (tracks: 2, 5, 13, 18, 21)
- James "Soulja Slim" Tapp – vocals (tracks: 3, 19)
- Torence "Lil' Boosie" Hatch – vocals (track 3)
- Corey "C-Murder" Miller – vocals (track 3)
- Byron "Mannie Fresh" Thomas – vocals (track 5), producer & recording (tracks: 5, 11)
- Matravious Cooks – vocals (track 8)
- Russell "Magnolia Chop" Veals – vocals (tracks: 9, 14)
- Dwayne "Lil' Wayne" Carter – vocals (track 10)
- Terius "Juvenile" Gray – vocals (track 10)
- Tremaine "Trey Songz" Neverson – vocals & recording (track 10)
- D'Ville – additional vocals (track 14)
- Clifford "T.I." Harris – vocals (track 16), co-executive producer
- Roger "Masta Raja" Greene Jr. – producer (track 1)
- Yusef "Sef Millz" Alexander – producer (track 1)
- Sir Stephen Beaux – producer & recording (track 2)
- Craig S. "KLC" Lawson – producer (tracks: 3, 6), recording (tracks: 3, 6, 10), mixing (tracks: 2, 6)
- Roderick "Bass Heavy" Tillman – producer & mixing (tracks: 4, 15), mastering (tracks: 1, 4, 7–9, 12, 15)
- Chris "Savage" LeDay – producer & recording (tracks: 7, 8, 12)
- Joseph "Joe Boom" Pellegrini – producer & recording (tracks: 9, 14)
- Marcello "Cool" Valenzano – producer (track 10)
- Andre "Dre" Lyon – producer (track 10)
- Dupree – producer & mixing (track 13)
- Joe Lindsay – producer (track 13)
- Scott Storch – producer (track 16)
- J.U.S.T.I.C.E. League – producers (track 17)
- Adrian "AD" Watts – producer & mixing (track 18), recording (track 14)
- L. "Crack Tracks" Parker – producer & mixing (track 19)
- Ceasar Productions – producer (tracks: 20, 21)
- Carlos "Storm" Martinez – recording (tracks: 1, 17)
- Robert "DJ Arsenal" Joiner – recording (tracks: 3, 10)
- 2 Saint – recording (track 3)
- Big Wayne – recording (track 3)
- Elliot Carter – recording (tracks: 4, 15–17)
- Howard White – recording (tracks: 5, 11)
- Philip M. Jones II – recording (tracks: 5, 11)
- Jamaal "Maal the Pimp" Hicks – recording (track 9)
- DJ Spin – recording (track 13)
- Conrad Golding – recording (track 16)
- Wayne Allison – recording (track 16)
- Tony Rey – recording (track 17)
- Lay-Lo – mixing (tracks: 1, 7–9, 12)
- Leslie Brathwaite – mixing (tracks: 5, 11, 12)
- Nat "DJ Gizmo" Robinson – mixing (tracks: 10, 14)
- Mike Bona – mixing (track 13)
- Fabian Marasciullo – mixing (track 16)
- Carlos Bess – mixing (track 17)
- Arnold Mischkulnig – mixing (tracks: 20, 21), mastering (tracks: 2, 3, 5, 6, 11, 13, 14, 16–21)
- Lucas "Lowkis" Romopotis – recording assistant (track 16)
- Chris Gehringer – mastering (track 10)
- Carol A. Dorsey – executive producer

== Charts ==
Chart (2009)	Peak position
US Billboard 200	77
US Top R&B/Hip-Hop Albums (Billboard)	14
US Top Rap Albums (Billboard)	6
