= U.N.L.V. (group) =

American hip hop group

- Origin: New Orleans, Louisiana, U.S.
- Genres: Hip hop, Southern hip hop, bounce, gangsta rap
- Years active: 1992–present
- Labels: Cash Money; Take Fo' Records; Blazin' South; B-Real
- Members: Tec-9; Lil Ya
- Past members: Yella Boy (deceased)

U.N.L.V. is a hip-hop group from New Orleans, Louisiana consisting of Lil Ya, Tec-9 and Yella Boy. Their name is an acronym for "Uptown Niggas Living Violent".

== Music career ==
The original members of the group were Lil Ya (Yaphet Jones), Tec-9 (Reginald Manuel), and Yella Boy (Albert Thomas). Their debut album, 6th and Baronne, was released in 1993 on Cash Money. The album was not released outside of the local region, but it was successful there and established Cash Money as a prominent label in the city. Today it is often considered a classic of New Orleans rap. Their next two albums, Straight Out Tha Gutta in 1994 and Mac Melph Calio in 1995, were similar to their debut. The raps were mostly about guns, violence, and sex overlaying New Orleans bounce beats provided by Mannie Fresh. The group released one more album on Cash Money in 1996, titled Uptown 4 Life. This was the group's first album to have more than a local distribution, and it was their first and only album to chart nationally, peaking at #86 on the Billboard R&B/Hip-Hop Albums chart. The album featured the song "Drag 'Em in the River", which was a diss song directed at fellow New Orleans rapper Mystikal. According to Mannie Fresh in a 2008 interview, the song's beat was the major reason Cash Money was able to sign rapper Juvenile, and in 2001 the same beat was reused for Juvenile's single "Set It Off". The group's success was tempered, however, by the death of group member Yella Boy, who was murdered in 1997 in New Orleans.

Following this album, the group left Cash Money Records. Although the group was no longer on the label, Cash Money began re-releasing the group's albums and giving them national distribution. This later lead to a lawsuit from the group against the label, claiming the label could not re-release their material without their permission when they were not on the label. The suit was settled in July 2007, with the settlement being confidential.

After leaving Cash Money, the group went on a hiatus for some time, but in the 2000s they released three more studio albums, The Return of U.N.L.V.: Trendsetters in 2001, Keep It Gutta in 2003, and "The Relaunch" on May 20, 2016. Their latest album has a feature from former Cash Money member Turk. Following the settlement of their 2007 lawsuit with Cash Money, U.N.L.V. released "U.N.L.V. Greatest Hits Collection."

== Discography ==
- 6th and Baronne (1993)
- Straight Out tha Gutta (1994)
- Mac Melph Calio (1995)
- Uptown 4 Life (1996)
- Greatest Hits with New Songs (1997)
- Another Massacre (1999) (Lil Ya Album)
- The Return of U.N.L.V.: Trendsetters (2001)
- Keep It Gutta (2003)
- Gutta for Life (2004)
- Greatest Hits Collection (2012)
- Hoodmac Mentality (2012) (Lil Ya Mixtape)
- The Relaunch (2014)
- ‘Temperature Check’ (2025) (Tec 9)
