= B.G. (rapper) =

American rapper

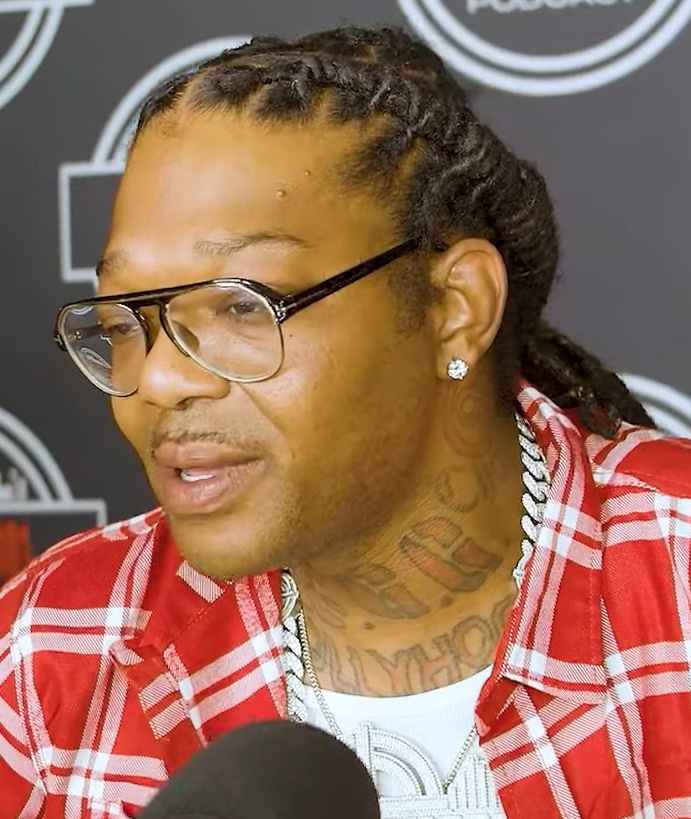
- B.G. in 2025

Background information
- Also known as: Lil' Doogie; B. Gizzle; Bling Bling Slim; Geezy
- Born: Christopher Noel Dorsey; September 3, 1980 (age 46); New Orleans, Louisiana, U.S.
- Genres: Southern hip-hop; gangsta rap; bounce; trap; pop rap
- Occupations: Rapper; songwriter
- Works: B.G. discography
- Years active: 1995–2012; 2023–present
- Labels: Atlantic; Koch; Chopper City; Cash Money; Universal
- Member of: The B.G.'z; Cash Money Millionaires; Hot Boys

Christopher Noel Dorsey (born September 3, 1980), better known by his stage name B.G. (short for Baby Gangsta; formerly Lil Doogie), is an American rapper from New Orleans, Louisiana. He began his musical career in 1993 upon signing with Birdman's Cash Money Records at the age of 12. Dorsey and label-mates Lil Wayne, Juvenile and Turk collectively formed the group Hot Boys in 1997, with whom he released three albums until disbanding in 2001.

As a solo act, Dorsey has released five solo albums for Cash Money: Chopper City (1996), It's All on U, Vol. 1 (1997), It's All on U, Vol. 2 (1997), the platinum-certified Chopper City in the Ghetto (1999) and Checkmate (2000)—to moderate success. He parted ways with the label in 2002 and founded Chopper City Records later that year. Dorsey was incarcerated from 2012 to 2023, and promptly continued recording following his release.

== Early life ==
Dorsey was born on September 3, 1980, at Charity Hospital in New Orleans, Louisiana. He grew up in the Freret neighborhood of Uptown New Orleans, which is located in the 13th Ward. The Dorsey family lived in a shotgun house on the corner of Valence and Magnolia Street. When he was 12, his father was killed during an attempted robbery. He then began selling crack cocaine and hanging out on street corners with drug dealers. While attending middle school, he started rapping and eventually met with Bryan "Birdman" Williams (a.k.a. Baby) in a barbershop in 1993. Birdman and his brother "Slim" took Dorsey in, allowing him to stay with them. They later signed him to Cash Money Records. At 15, he dropped out of high school and began using heroin, but remained focused on his recording career.

== Career ==
At age fourteen, B.G. (then known as Lil Doogie) began working with another New Orleans pre-teenager named Baby D (later known as Lil Wayne). The two were both signed to Cash Money Records, and they came together as a duo named The B.G.'z. In 1995, they released their only studio album, True Story. The album was ultimately re-released in 1999 as a B.G. solo album.

He released the album Chopper City in 1996 and the albums It's All on U, Vol. 1 and Vol. 2 in 1997. He was also part of the group Hot Boys with other local rappers Lil Wayne, Juvenile, Turk, and Baby's nephew Derrick a.k.a. Bulletproof (who eventually left the group). The group's debut album, Get It How U Live!, was released in October 1997.

In 1998, Cash Money Records signed a deal with Universal Records, which released Chopper City in the Ghetto in April 1999. The album included the hit song "Bling Bling", which further popularized the hip-hop slang term "bling bling" describing shiny, expensive jewelry, automobiles, or other forms of opulence. The Oxford English Dictionary added "bling bling" in 2003. The Hot Boys' second album, Guerrilla Warfare, was released in July 1999 and reached No.5 on the Billboard 200 chart.

Checkmate (2000) was B.G.'s last album with Cash Money Records. In 2002, when B.G. left Cash Money Records, he claimed to have left the label over a financial dispute with owners Birdman and Ronald "Slim" Williams, which caused controversy at the time. The following year, he released his sixth studio album Livin' Legend on his own label, Chopper City Records.

He released Life After Cash Money in 2004, The Heart of tha Streetz, Vol. 1 in 2005, and The Heart of tha Streetz, Vol. 2 (I Am What I Am), which reached No. 6 on the Billboard 200, in 2006. With the Chopper City Boyz, he recorded We Got This in 2007 and Life in the Concrete Jungle in 2008. In 2009, the Hot Boys agreed to a reunion. This plan was later scrapped, though B.G. and Juvenile did appear briefly on stage at a Lil Wayne concert that June. B.G. released his tenth studio album, Too Hood 2 Be Hollywood, in December 2009 after many delays. It included the hit single "My Hood" which featured longtime friend Mannie Fresh.

In June 2010, B.G. released a collaborative mixtape with Baton Rouge rapper Lil Boosie titled "22504 (225504)", which is the combined area codes of their respective hometowns. A month later, B.G. released a solo mixtape titled Money Side, Murda Side where he introduces his newfound group, Chopper City Gorilla Gang (or simply CCGG). He released his street album titled HollyHood on October 5, 2010.

== Legal issues ==
On November 3, 2009, Dorsey was arrested in New Orleans, Louisiana after police pulled over his Chevrolet Tahoe during a routine traffic stop. It is rumored that he was leaving the home of his girlfriend in uptown New Orleans when he was stopped by the police in eastern New Orleans. During a search of the vehicle, police found three guns, two of which were reported stolen. Dorsey was booked into the Orleans Parish Jail on an illegal carrying of weapons charge. When Dorsey appeared in court on November 5, his incarceration and bond information were unknown to the press at that time.

On February 11, 2010, Dorsey appeared in court and entered a not guilty plea. According to the indictment, Dorsey was in possession of a firearm between August 2009 (count 1) and again on November 3, 2009 (count 2). It also states that Dorsey and two passengers in the vehicle conspired to obstruct justice when one signed what prosecutors later categorized as a "false affidavit" when he took sole responsibility for the firearms. Prior to Dorsey's trial, one passenger pleaded guilty for "his role in the offenses" and was sentenced to serve 20 years in prison, while the other pleaded guilty to Misprision of a felony and received 30 months in prison.

On December 7, 2011, Dorsey pleaded guilty to two counts of being a felon in possession of a firearm and one count of conspiracy to obstruct justice. On July 18, 2012, he was sentenced to 14 years in a federal prison and three years of federal supervision upon his release.

On September 5, 2023, Dorsey was released from prison after serving 11 of his 14 year sentence. As a condition of his release, on June 28, 2024, he was ordered to have all his future songs approved by the US government.

== Discography ==
Studio albums

- Chopper City (1996)
- It's All on U, Vol. 1 (1997)
- It's All on U, Vol. 2 (1997)
- Chopper City in the Ghetto (1999)
- Checkmate (2000)
- Livin' Legend (2003)
- Life After Cash Money (2004)
- The Heart of tha Streetz, Vol. 1 (2005)
- The Heart of tha Streetz, Vol. 2 (I Am What I Am) (2006)
- Too Hood 2 Be Hollywood (2009)
- Freedom of Speech (2025)

Collaborative albums

- True Story (with Lil Wayne) (1995)
- Get It How U Live! (with Hot Boys) (1997)
- Guerrilla Warfare (with Hot Boys) (1999)
- Baller Blockin' (with Cash Money Millionaires) (2000)
- Let 'Em Burn (with Hot Boys) (2003)
- We Got This (with Chopper City Boyz) (2007)
- Life in the Concrete Jungle (with Chopper City Boyz) (2008)
- 225504 (with Lil Boosie) (2010)
- Choppers & Bricks (with Gucci Mane) (2023)

== See also ==
- Hot Boys
- Cash Money Records
