= Big Tymers =

American hip hop duo

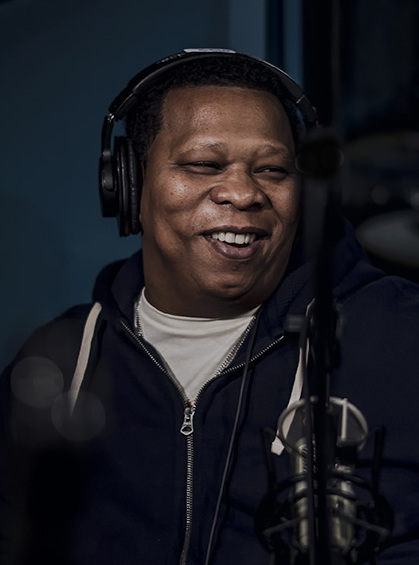
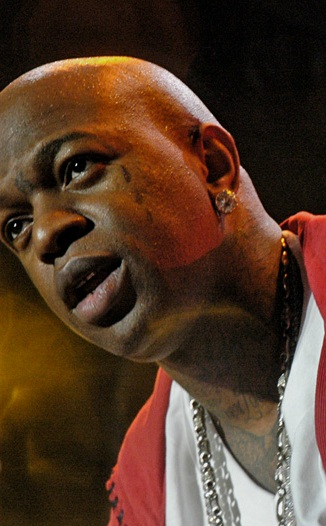
- The duo, consisting of Mannie Fresh (left) and Birdman (a.k.a. Baby of Cash Money) (right)

Background information
- Origin: New Orleans, Louisiana, U.S.
- Genres: Hip hop; Southern hip-hop
- Years active: 1997–2005; 2018; 2024—present
- Labels: Universal; Cash Money
- Spinoff of: Cash Money Millionaires
- Members: Baby; Mannie Fresh

Big Tymers (also stylized as Big Tymer$) is an American hip hop duo composed of Cash Money Records co-founder Baby (later known as Birdman) and the label's in-house producer Mannie Fresh, both of whom originate from New Orleans, Louisiana. Formed in 1997, the act is a spin-off of the label's supergroup, Cash Money Millionaires.

The duo has released five studio albums: How You Luv That (1997) and its reissue (1998), I Got That Work (2000), Hood Rich (2002), and Big Money Heavyweight (2003). Hood Rich peaked atop the Billboard 200 and spawned the single "Still Fly", which peaked at number 11 on the Billboard Hot 100. In 2005, Mannie Fresh resigned from Cash Money due to financial disputes with Birdman and his brother, Ronald "Slim" Williams, effectively dissolving the duo.

In 2018, the duo reunited for the song "Designer Caskets", released for the Cash Money Records documentary soundtrack album Before Anythang.

== History ==
The duo recorded their first album How You Luv That in 1997 featuring all of the rappers on Cash Money Records including B.G. and Juvenile. The album reached a peak of No. 25 of the R&B/hip hop chart and the lower reaches of the Billboard 200. Cash Money re-released How You Luv That as How You Luv That Vol. 2 in late 1998 after signing its distribution deal with Universal Records. This re-release substitutes a remix of "Stun'n" for the original version and adds "Big Ballin'", "Money & Power", and "Drop It Like It's Hot. How You Luv That Vol. 2 almost reached the top 100 of the Billboard album chart and reached the top 20 of the Billboard R&B and hip hop chart.

Their second album I Got That Work released in 2000 reached the top 5 of the US album chart and topped the US R&B/hip hop chart. This album spawned two big hits in "Get Your Roll On" and "#1 Stunna" reaching the top 30 on the R&B singles charts.

Hood Rich released in 2002 topped both the US album and R&B charts. "Still Fly" from the album reached the top 20 on the R&B singles charts and No. 11 on the pop charts. "Oh Yeah!" reached the top 50 of the Billboard Hot 100 and the top 30 of the R&B/hip hop charts.

Big Money Heavyweight in 2003 was not as successful reaching No. 21 on the album charts and top ten in the R&B charts. A remix album made the lower reaches of the R&B/hip hop charts in 2004. "Gangsta Girl" from the album made the lower reaches of the Billboard Hot 100 and the top 40 of the R&B charts.

In 2005, it was announced that Mannie Fresh was leaving Cash Money Records and signing with Def Jam Records. His departure resulted in the duo's disbandment.

As of May 2013, Birdman, Lil Wayne and Drake have been in talks of restarting the group with an upcoming album, while original member Mannie Fresh would not be included. While doing promotion for the Rich Gang, Birdman indicated that a Big Tymers single would be released in Fall of 2013 with a possibility that Mannie Fresh may also be involved with the album.

In 2018, the duo reunited on a new track called "Designer Caskets" (it being their first song in 14 years) for the soundtrack of the Before Anythang: The Cash Money Story documentary.

== Discography ==
Studio albums

- How You Luv That (1997)
- How You Luv That Vol. 2 (1998)
- I Got That Work (2000)
- Hood Rich (2002)
- Big Money Heavyweight (2003)

Collaborative albums

- Baller Blockin' (with Cash Money Millionaires) (2000)

== Filmography ==
- Baller Blockin' (2000)
