= Ronald "Slim" Williams =

American businessman (born 1964)

- Born: Ronald Jay Williams; November 11, 1964 (age 62); New Orleans, Louisiana, U.S.
- Other names: Slim tha Don, Sugar Slim, The Godfather
- Occupations: Record executive; entrepreneur
- Years active: 1985–present
- Labels: Republic; Universal Motown; Cash Money
- Children: BenJarvus Green-Ellis
- Relatives: Bryan Williams (brother)

Ronald Jay "Slim" Williams (born November 11, 1964) is an American entrepreneur and record executive who co-founded the record label Cash Money Records in 1991, with his younger brother, rapper Bryan "Birdman" Williams. He and Bryan have served as executive producer for many of the label's major releases since 1997. In contrast to his brother, he has not contributed musically to any known production.

== Early life ==
Ronald Jay Williams was born on November 11, 1964, to Johnnie Williams and Gladys Brooks. His father was an ex-military man and owner of multiple businesses in New Orleans. The business commitments of Johnnie did not allow for a complete presence in Ronald's early life, but he made timely child support payments, ensuring his children had what they needed. Williams lived his early years on Saratoga street in New Orleans, in a small home atop Gladys' bar. The bar, which was named after and run by his mother, was the local hangout spot for all types of people from the neighborhood; hustlers, pimps, prostitutes, businessmen and drug dealers. The dangers of this home environment became most present when Williams' father was non-fatally shot during an attempted robbery of the bar while the children were home.

Williams' mother Gladys Brooks died in 1975. The death occurred when Ronald was 10 years old and was unexpected. As his father, Johnnie, failed to sign his birth certificate, Ronald and his siblings were placed under state care in the foster system for two years. When Williams' father was able to win back custody of the children in court, the children moved uptown to Valence street where they lived in Johnnie's family home with the children of his wife at the time. In total, Ronald had 10 brothers and 12 sisters. The rest of Ronald's early life was spent riding minibikes, skating and playing basketball. People that knew him at the time described him as "quiet" yet "always thinking".

== Influences ==
=== Business influences ===
The influence of father Johnnie Williams on Ronald "Slim" Williams is evident when observing his independent, business-minded nature. As the owner of multiple businesses, his father's willingness to work hard for money was instilled within him from a young age. This 'hustler' attitude fueled him and his brother's business-minded hunger and pursuit of independence from a young age.

=== Musical influences ===
The musical history and culture within New Orleans is the primary influence that molded Williams into the world-renowned musician that he is today. The New Orleans musical culture is based on the habits and livelihoods of the people that reside within the city. Ultimately, the local identity within New Orleans has a direct impact on musical culture, and it is the unique cultural environment in which Williams grew up that molded his personal and musical career. As Williams' label pushed forward the bounce music sound in the United States, it was evident that local identity and his cultural roots influenced his precise music selection, management and production.

== Legal issues ==
On November 27, 2007, Williams was arrested for marijuana possession in Tennessee. He was among 16 people charged for possession of more than 1/2 an ounce of marijuana. His brother Birdman was also arrested and detained overnight. Their RV was pulled over by police for making an improper lane change on a road trip from New Orleans to New York for a BET network shoot.

Between 2009 and 2012, Williams was involved in a lawsuit between his label Cash Money Records and EMI music on behalf of label artist Lil Wayne. This came despite the Williams brothers' mentorship of Wayne throughout his career. The legal battle was in relation to unpaid licensing fees on Grammy award-winning album Tha Carter III. In 2012, a judge ruled that Cash Money owed Wayne and his label $1.5 million for "direct, contributory and vicarious inducement of copyright infringement, unfair competition and breach of contract." Despite this, legal disputes have continued to occur between the two parties, mostly pertaining to withheld and delayed music releases.

== Other ventures ==
=== Bronald Oil ===
In 2010, Williams and his brother started an oil exploration business, "Bronald Oil". It was founded with the goal to develop oil exploration properties in the United States and Central America. The company has had varying presence since its inception. A 2010 Bloomberg News investigation into the company revealed a number of inconsistencies with claims made by the business and its actual operations in the key areas targeted on their website. Namely, it was discovered that oil and gas regulators within these jurisdictions had never heard of Bronald Oil. This report coincided with the website being taken down from the internet. The company was re-registered and began operating in 2013.

=== Cash Money Content ===
Cash Money Content was created in 2010 as an additional component of the Cash Money Records brand. The launch of Cash Money Content saw Williams and his brother's creation of a book publishing business and film making organization. The book side of the business was created in partnership with Simon & Schuster's Atria Books division, acting as the primary distributor. Williams has been involved in community-focused initiatives through Cash Money Content. In 2014, Williams publicly supported Cash Money Content's online pro-reading campaign stating; "Reading is an important step in the right direction toward making a difference in our community".

=== Charity work ===
Giving back to the community has always been a major focus of Williams. Since the late 1990s, Williams and his brother have hosted a community Thanksgiving giveaway, where over 2000 Thanksgiving turkeys are personally handed out for free. Access to free medical screening is also provided at these events.

In February 2009, the Williams brothers were featured in CNBC's Newbos: The Rise of America's New Black Overclass, a documentary show profiling several black multi-millionaires. Williams appeared in Lil Wayne's Behind the Music episode, which premiered September 10, 2009.
