= Cash Money Records =

American record label

- Parent company: Universal Music Group
- Founded: 1991; 35 years ago
- Founder: Ronald "Slim" Williams; Bryan "Baby" Williams
- Status: Active
- Distributors: Republic Records (United States); Universal Records (1998–2006); Universal Music Group (International)
- Genre: Various, with a focus on: hip-hop; R&B
- Country of origin: United States
- Location: New Orleans, Louisiana, U.S. Miami, Florida, U.S.
- Official website: cashmoney-records.com

Cash Money Records is an American record label founded in 1991 by brothers and record executives Ronald "Slim" Williams and Bryan "Baby" Williams. The label gained prominence in the late 1990s for having signed and released albums for New Orleans–based musical acts including B.G., Lil Wayne, Juvenile, Young Turk and the Hot Boys. It became an imprint of Universal Records, a division of Universal Music Group in March 1998, and remained so during its following iterations as Universal Motown and ultimately Republic Records.

In the late 2000s, Cash Money signed and released projects for a number of prominent hip-hop artists, including Drake and Nicki Minaj. Wayne launched Young Money Entertainment in 2005, which operated as an imprint of the label and Republic Records until 2018—a joint venture colloquially branded as Young Money Cash Money Billionaires (abbreviated as YMCMB). The label has been commonly regarded as among the most successful urban contemporary music labels of the 2000s to 2010s.

The label has released a total of 12 number one albums on the Billboard 200, and seven number one singles on the Billboard Hot 100 chart: Lil Wayne's "Lollipop", Jay Sean's "Down", and Drake's "One Dance", "God's Plan", "Nice for What", and "In My Feelings", and Juvenile's "Slow Motion".

The label's name alludes to the Cash Money Brothers, drug kingpin Nino Brown's gang from the 1991 crime film New Jack City.

== History ==
=== 1991–1997: Beginnings ===
Bryan Williams, also known as Birdman, told some of his close friends the motivation for starting the label:

I was hoping it would get us out of the projects and into a positive way of life. And we wanted to help other people get out of this poverty...

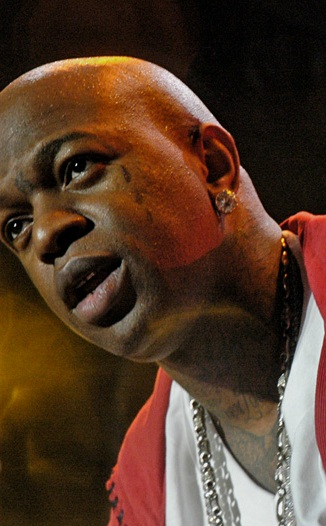
Bryan "Baby" Williams (pictured) founded Cash Money Records in 1991 with his brother Ronald "Slim" Williams.

Cash Money's first artist, New Orleans–based rapper Kilo G, issued his debut album, The Sleepwalker, in 1992 as the label's first release. The label then signed the hip-hop group U.N.L.V., composed of rappers Lil Ya, Tec 9 and Yella Boy. They released the projects 6th & Baronne (1993), Mac Melph Calio (1995), and Uptown 4 Life (1996) under the label. They were some of the original bounce rappers that help create a sound in New Orleans, along with the label's following releases. Kilo G's second and final album, The Bloody City (1995), was the label's first project to be produced entirely by Mannie Fresh, who would do so on most of the label's following releases. Kilo G was murdered in 1997. From 1993 to 1995, the label signed several other hip-hop artists in the New Orleans area, including B.G., Lil Wayne, and Juvenile, each of whom already had buzz in the streets.

By this time, Turk and another local rapper by the name of Bulletproof (a.k.a. Lil Derrick; born Derrick Williams, Birdman's nephew) joined the roster. In May 1997, Birdman organized the rap group Hot Boys, which at the time included Juvenile, Turk, B.G. and Bulletproof. Lil Wayne later joined the group, shortly after the death of his father. Bulletproof was voted out the group before recording any major releases, according to Turk. Bulletproof, who referred to himself as the #2 Stunna, was later killed in 2002.

Cash Money's commercial breakthrough came in 1998 when the Hot Boys–B.G. and Juvenile in particular–caught the attention of Universal Records executives. Wendy Day effectively negotiated a deal between Cash Money and the Universal Music Group (UMG) subsidiary (known currently as Republic Records), which became a 70%-30% distribution deal. Later, UMG acquired a portion of Cash Money Records, making it a subsidiary of the company.

=== 1998–2000 Universal Records deal ===
Cash Money signed a three-year, $30 million distribution deal with Universal Records in March 1998, under which the Williams brothers were given a $2 million advance each year and a credit of $1.5 million for each of the six artists that they had at the time. After recouping, Universal Records would retain 15% of profits from album sales, while Cash Money retained 85%, as well as 50% of their publishing royalties and ownership of all master recordings. Dino Delvaille, who orchestrated the deal, later told HitQuarters: "I made certain they retained (the rights) of their work. They deserve it." Cash Money's first success under Universal was Juvenile's November 1998 release, 400 Degreez. The album peaked at number 9 on the Billboard Top 200 and would ultimately go on to sell over five million copies worldwide. The success of 400 Degreez solidified Cash Money as a powerhouse label in the national hip-hop scene. The album featured guest appearances from Cash Money artists Turk, Lil Wayne, B.G., Baby, Alezeay and Mannie Fresh (both individually and as their groups the Hot Boys and Big Tymers), as well as a guest appearance from Jay-Z, the first time an East Coast rapper collaborated with Cash Money.

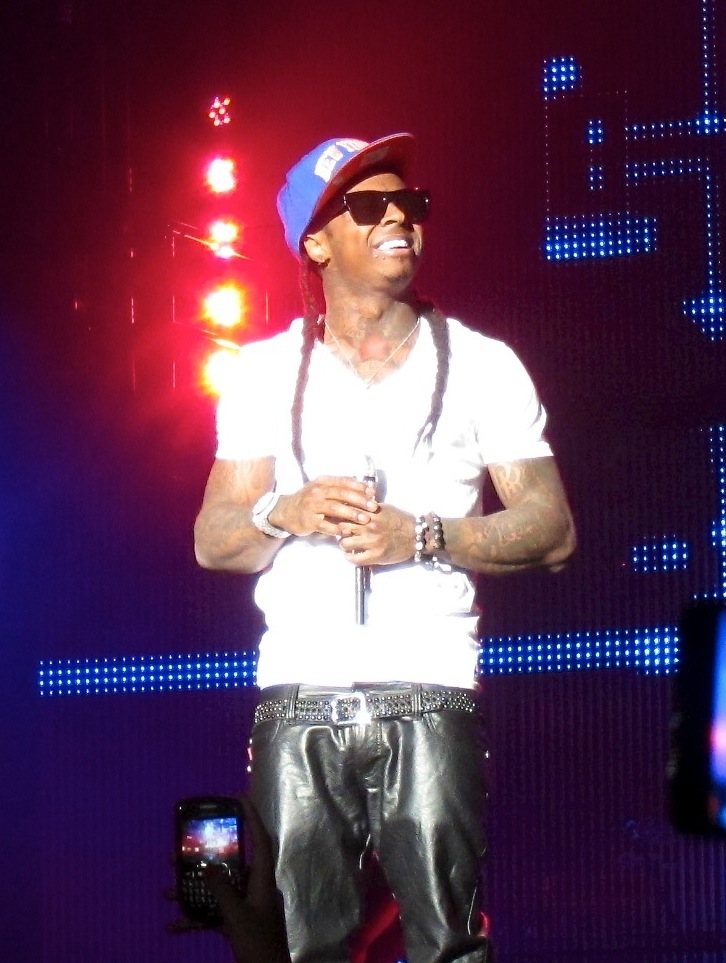
Lil Wayne started as a member of the Hot Boys and became the label's best-selling artist.

After the deal, Cash Money achieved a new level of success. Later albums in 1999 such as the Hot Boys' Guerrilla Warfare, B.G.'s Chopper City in the Ghetto, and Lil Wayne's Tha Block Is Hot also saw great chart success, were all certified Platinum by the RIAA, and furthered the label's reputation. These albums contained major Billboard hits such as Juvenile's "Back That Azz Up" (#19 on the Billboard Hot 100), B.G.'s "Bling Bling" (#36), and the Hot Boys' "I Need a Hot Girl" (#65). All of Cash Money's albums and singles in this period were solely produced by the label's in-house producer, Mannie Fresh. Their A&R at Universal, Dino Delvaille, said:

When they first came into the business, they were very reluctant to make records with other people. They probably felt that people would steal their style or flavor, and I had to work hard to get them to open up to making records with Cam'ron, Puffy, and Clipse, among others.

=== 2000–2012: Continued success and various signings ===
The label's success continued into the 2000s. Between 2001 and 2003, the label sold 7 million albums. The song "Still Fly" by the Big Tymers was nominated for two Grammy Awards. However, B.G. and Juvenile left the label by 2002, claiming financial mismanagement. In April 2003, Juvenile returned to the label for a reported $4 million deal, and in return, he signed over the rights to Juve The Great, an album which sold over a million copies and contained the Billboard Hot 100 No. 1 hit "Slow Motion". In 2007, former Hot Boys member Lil Wayne was named president of Cash Money Records and CEO of Young Money Entertainment. Later that year, Lil Wayne stepped down as president to focus on his career, especially Tha Carter III. In 2008, Lil Wayne re-signed with Cash Money, ensuring that his next few albums will be produced by the label.

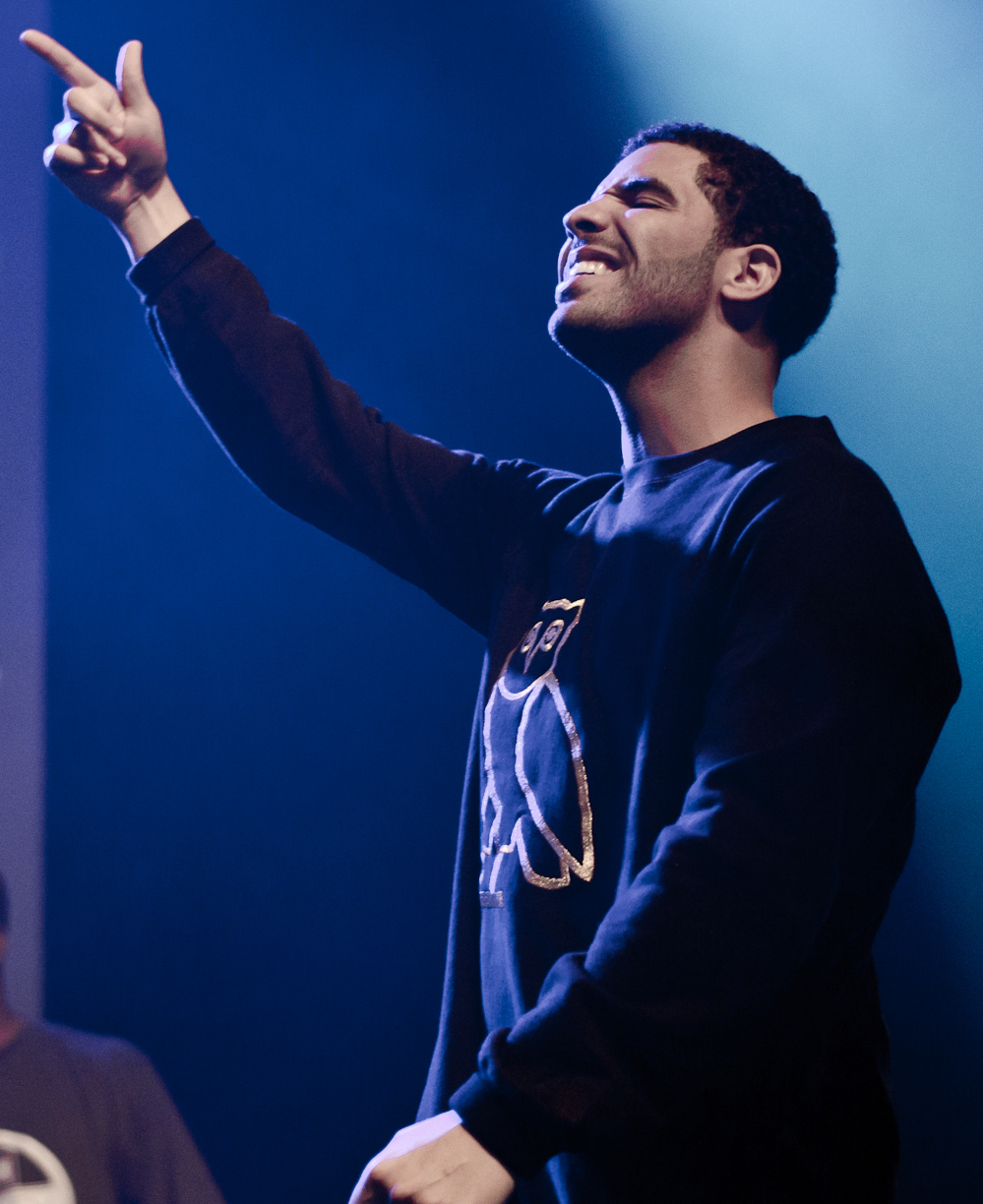
Drake signed to the label in 2009 and has released Thank Me Later, Take Care, Nothing Was the Same, Views, More Life, and Scorpion.

In September 2008, Cash Money released rocker Kevin Rudolf's smash-hit debut single "Let It Rock" featuring label-mate Lil Wayne. On October 15, 2008, at the MOBO Awards, British R&B singer Jay Sean announced that he had signed with Cash Money Records. In February 2009, the Williams brothers were featured in CNBC's Newbos: The Rise of America's New Black Overclass, a documentary show profiling several black multi-millionaires. In early 2009, it was announced that former Roc-A-Fella Records artist Freeway signed with the label, although he was never officially signed to the label. On August 16, 2009, Bow Wow announced that he signed with Cash Money Records.

In 2009, they took part in a major label bidding war for Queens native rapper Nicki Minaj. Eventually, they won the bidding war and Nicki Minaj was signed to them exclusively for Young Money. Cash Money Records popularity grew after signing Minaj and Canadian rapper Drake. On August 5, 2010, production group Cool & Dre signed with Cash Money Records. The production group announced the news via Twitter. They are the first in house producer Cash Money has had since Mannie Fresh.

On August 19, 2010, Birdman signed DJ Khaled to the label, also signing his label We the Best Music Group as a subsidiary of Cash Money. On February 24, 2012, Cash Money Records signed the nu metal band Limp Bizkit. Wayne said the same day they were close to signing Ashanti.

In 2011, Cash Money Records signed a co-publishing venture with the Atria Publishing Group called Cash Money Content.

=== 2013–2017: Rich Gang and dissension ===
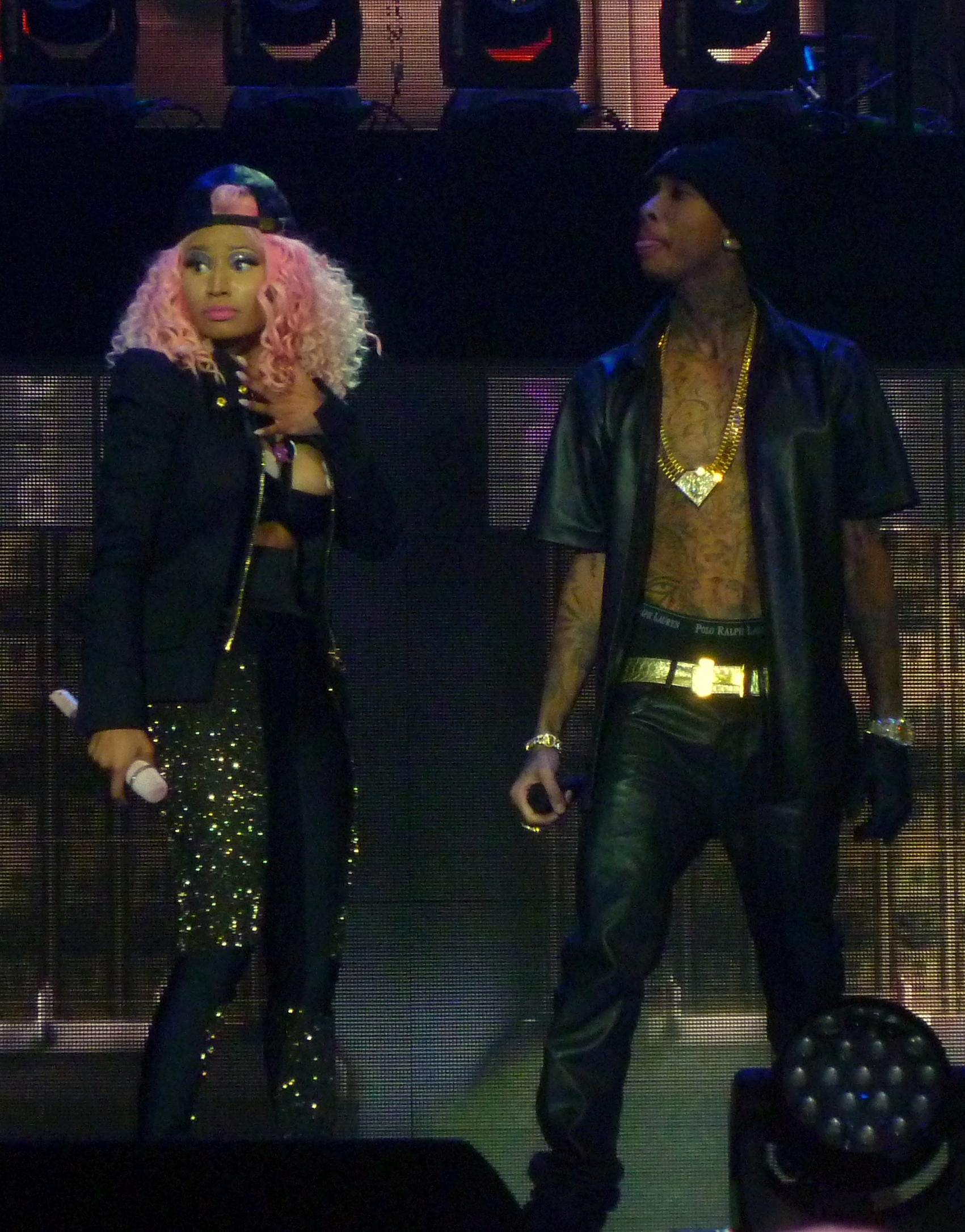
Nicki Minaj and Tyga signed to the label in the late 2000s and have both released highly commercially successful singles.

In February 2013, Birdman released a compilation mixtape with Cash Money and Young Money, entitled Rich Gang: All Stars. Shortly afterwards, he announced a compilation album entitled Rich Gang: Flashy Lifestyle that was due to be released on May 21, 2013—it featured members of Cash Money, Young Money, and various collaborators. The first single from the project, "Tapout" was released on March 19, 2013, and features Lil Wayne, Future, Mack Maine, and Nicki Minaj, with production by 808 Mafia's Southside and TM88. "Fly Rich" featuring Stevie J, Future, Tyga, Meek Mill and Mystikal was also released as a promotional single.

The album's release date was then pushed back to July 23, 2013, while the title was also shortened to just Rich Gang. The album garnered a mixed critical reception and debuted at number 7 on the Billboard 200.

On December 4, 2014, just five days before Tha Carter V was due to be released, Wayne issued a statement saying the album would not be released on its expected release date due to his displeasure with Birdman refusing to release the album, although it had been completed. Wayne also expressed his feelings by stating he felt he and his creative partner were being held "prisoner". Lil Wayne filed a lawsuit. On January 20, 2015, Wayne self-released Sorry 4 the Wait 2, a sequel to his 2011 mixtape, to compensate for the continued delay of Tha Carter V. Upon Sorry for the Wait 2's release, it was noted that Wayne disses Birdman and Cash Money Records several times throughout. Birdman was reported to be upset with this. In late January 2015, Lil Wayne filed a $51 million lawsuit against Birdman and Cash Money over the delay of Tha Carter V.

In January 2015, Wayne stated that when he leaves Cash Money, he would take Drake and Nicki Minaj with him. On June 22, TMZ reported new details on the lawsuit. According to documents filed by Lil Wayne, Birdman and Cash Money have mismanaged Young Money, including Drake and Minaj. The documents allege that Birdman and Cash Money haven't paid people. In June 2015, Wayne joined Jay-Z's Tidal as an artist owner and exclusively released a single on the service titled "Glory". On July 4, 2015, Wayne released Free Weezy Album exclusively through Tidal under Young Money and Republic Records. On July 15, prosecutors allege Birdman and Young Thug conspired to murder Lil Wayne and were involved in the April 26 shooting. On July 16, Birdman filed a $50 million lawsuit against Jay Z's Tidal streaming service over Lil Wayne's Free Weezy Album. The lawsuit claims that Cash Money Records exclusively owns the rights to Lil Wayne's music, although he is now independent and the label no longer owns these rights.

On April 12, 2017, Birdman accepted a plaque in honor of Cash Money Records having sold one billion units. On September 13, 2018, it was announced that Young Money was no longer a joint business venture with Cash Money. Ownership of the imprint was granted entirely to Lil Wayne as part of the legal settlements with Birdman that were finalized.

== Roster ==
=== Current ===
Act	Year signed	# Albums under label
Birdman	Co-founder	6
Jacquees	2014	6
Juvenile	2014 (re-sign)	5
Turk	2015 (re-sign)	1
Elettra Lamborghini	2017	1
9lokkNine	2018	1
Rublow	2022	
B.G.	2023 (re-sign)	6
Midnvght	2024	–

== Branches ==
=== Rich Gang ===
Rich Gang
- Genre: Hip-hop
- Years active: 2013–present
- Label: Cash Money Records
- Members: Birdman; Young Thug; Jacquees; Rublow; Saxkboy KD
- Past members: Rich Homie Quan (deceased); Robb Banks; BTY Young'n (deceased); Caskey; J-Soul; Neno Calvin; Trev Rich; Money Man; Young Greatness (deceased); Derez De'Shon

Rich Gang is a hip-hop collective and side project introduced by Birdman in 2013, initially composed of members from the Cash Money Records roster. The group's debut single, "Tapout" (featuring Future) was released in March 2013. Georgia rappers Young Thug and Rich Homie Quan became the core of the Rich Gang, debuting with guest appearances on the group's 2014 single "Lifestyle". The duo were also the primary artists on Rich Gang: Tha Tour Pt. 1 (2014). Later Rich Gang members—such as Derez De'Shon and Robb Banks—were part of the group despite not being signed to Cash Money as solo artists.

==== Awards and nominations ====
===== BET Awards =====
Year	Nominee / work	Award	Result	R
2015	Rich Gang	Best Group	Nominated	

=== Production wing ===
From its founding until 2005, Mannie Fresh was the well-known production head of all Cash Money releases, as the label's resident producer. The label would be without a proper in-house producer until August 2010, when production duo Cool & Dre signed to the label. Since then, the label has grown its production division by signing more producers.

- The Avengerz
- Bangladesh
- The Beat Bully
- Birdman
- Cool & Dre
- Detail
- DJ Nasty & LVM
- D Roc
- Illa Jones
- London on da Track
- Natra Average
- Mr. Beatz
- Superearz
- TEAUXNY
- The Olympicks
- RedOne
- The Renegades
- Sap
- JAE L.A.

== Legal issues ==
In October 2009, Cash Money Records, Birdman, Lil Wayne and various music distribution outlets were sued for copyright infringement by Thomas Marasciullo, who claims his voice was used without permission. The rappers asked him to record some "Italian-styled spoken word recordings" in 2006. The lyrics were allegedly used on "Respect" and other tracks from the rappers' collaboration album Like Father, Like Son and Birdman's 5 * Stunna.

In 2011, Cash Money Records, Lil Wayne, Universal Music Group, and Young Money Entertainment were sued for US$15 million by Done Deal Enterprises, who claim Lil Wayne's song "BedRock" was stolen from Done Deal.

== Discography ==
=== Compilation albums ===
List of compilation albums, with selected chart positions and certifications
Title	Album details	Peak chart positions		
Title	Album details	US	US R&B	US Rap
Rich Gang (Birdman)	Released: July 23, 2013; Label: Cash Money, Formats: CD, digital download	9	2	2

== See also ==
- Cash Money Millionaires
- List of former Cash Money Records artists
- Young Money Entertainment
