= Mannie Fresh =

American rapper (born 1969)

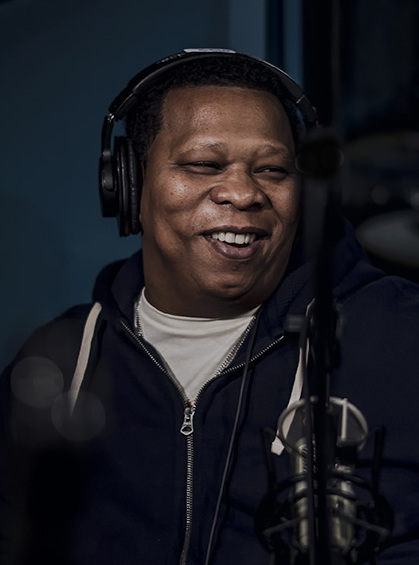
- Mannie Fresh in 2017

Background information
- Also known as: Manny Fresh; Lovely
- Born: Byron Otto Thomas; March 20, 1969 (age 57); New Orleans, Louisiana, U.S.
- Genre: Southern hip-hop
- Occupations: Rapper; record producer; disc jockey
- Years active: 1984–present
- Labels: Cash Money; Universal; Def Jam; Mass Appeal; Chubby Boy Productions, Inc.
- Formerly of: Big Tymers; Cash Money Millionaires

Byron Otto Thomas (born March 20, 1969), better known by his stage name Mannie Fresh, is an American rapper and record producer. He is best known for his production work for Cash Money Records releases, as well as being half of the hip hop duo Big Tymers with the label's co-founder, Birdman.

Beginning as the label's sole in-house producer in 1991, he received credits on the near-entirety of the label's output from 1998 until his departure in 2004. This resulted in 17 songs receiving gold, platinum, or multi-platinum certifications by the Recording Industry Association of America (RIAA) and 19 Billboard Hot 100 entries—which includes his 2004 debut single as a recording artist, "Real Big".

== Life and career ==
Thomas was born and raised in the 7th Ward of New Orleans, Louisiana. Influenced by his father DJ Sabu, Thomas became a DJ for New Orleans hip hop crew New York Incorporated in 1984 at age 15. In the late 1980s, he began a partnership with New Orleans rapper MC Gregory D. They released their first album together Throwdown in 1987, with Mannie Fresh producing and MC Gregory D rapping. They would release two more records together in the late 1980s and early 1990s. After their last album together, in 1993, Thomas met Bryan "Baby" Williams, who gave him an opportunity to become the in-house producer of his record label Cash Money Records. With Williams' help, Thomas made chart-topping albums for the Hot Boys, which was composed of B.G., Lil Wayne, Juvenile, and Turk, producing all of the group's albums. He also produced all tracks on the members' solo works as well.

Later, Thomas formed the Big Tymers along with Williams, as Mannie Fresh and Birdman, bringing him fame, and released five albums. In 2004, he released his own debut solo album The Mind of Mannie Fresh, which consisted of 30 tracks and featured the single "Real Big", which peaked at #79 on the Billboard Hot 100. In 2005, he split from Cash Money for financial reasons, and later joined Def Jam South. On October 27, 2009, Mannie Fresh released his second solo album, Return of the Ballin'. The album was entirely produced by Fresh himself and featured prominent guests Rick Ross and Lil Jon.

== Awards and honors ==
=== OffBeat's Best of The Beat Awards ===
Year	Category	Result	Ref.
2016	Best DJ	Won	
2023	Best DJ	Won	

== Discography ==
Studio albums

- The Mind of Mannie Fresh (2004)
- Return of the Ballin' (2009)

Collaborative albums

- How You Luv That (with Big Tymers) (1997)
- How You Luv That Vol. 2 (with Big Tymers) (1998)
- I Got That Work (with Big Tymers) (2000)
- Baller Blockin' (with Cash Money Millionaires) (2000)
- Hood Rich (with Big Tymers) (2002)
- Big Money Heavyweight (with Big Tymers) (2003)
