= Juvenile discography =

Hip hop recording artist discography

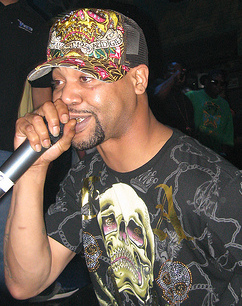
- Juvenile in 2008
- Studio albums: 11
- Compilation albums: 3
- Singles: 36
- Collaborative albums: 2
- Mixtapes: 7

This is the discography of rapper Juvenile. Juvenile has sold over 10 million albums worldwide.

== Albums ==
=== Studio albums ===
List of studio albums, with selected chart positions and certifications
Title	Album details	Peak chart positions			Certifications
Title	Album details	US	US R&B	US Rap	Certifications
Being Myself	Released: February 7, 1995; Label: Warlock; Formats: CD, LP, cassette, digital download	—	—	—	
Solja Rags	Released: May 13, 1997; Label: Cash Money; Formats: CD, LP, cassette, digital download	—	55	—	
400 Degreez	Released: November 3, 1998; Labels: Cash Money, Universal; Formats: CD, LP, cassette, digital download	9	1	—	RIAA: 4× Platinum
Tha G-Code	Released: December 14, 1999; Labels: Cash Money, Universal; Formats: CD, LP, cassette, digital download	10	1	—	RIAA: Platinum
Project English	Released: August 21, 2001; Labels: Cash Money, Universal; Formats: CD, LP, cassette, digital download	2	2	—	RIAA: Gold
Juve the Great	Released: December 23, 2003; Labels: Cash Money, Universal; Formats: CD, LP, cassette, digital download	28	4	2	RIAA: Platinum
Reality Check	Released: March 7, 2006; Labels: UTP, Atlantic; Formats: CD, LP, digital download	1	1	1	RIAA: Gold
Cocky & Confident	Released: December 1, 2009; Labels: UTP, E1 Music, Atlantic; Formats: CD, LP, digital download	49	7	3	
Beast Mode	Released: July 6, 2010; Labels: UTP, E1 Music; Formats: CD, LP, digital download	58	13	9	
Rejuvenation	Released: June 19, 2012; Labels: UTP, Young Empire, Fontana; Formats: CD, digital download	—	39	—	
The Fundamentals	Released: February 18, 2014; Label: UTP, Rap-A-Lot; Formats: CD, digital download	—	47	25	
Boiling Point	Released: March 27, 2026; Label: UTP, DNA Music, Hitmaker Distro; Formats: Digital download, streaming	—	—	—	
"—" denotes a recording that did not chart.

=== Collaborative albums ===
List of albums, with selected chart positions and year released
Title	Album details	Peak chart positions		
Title	Album details	US	US R&B	US Rap
Gotta Get It (with JT the Bigga Figga)	Released: October 2, 2002; Label: UTP, Get Low; Format: CD, digital download	—	—	—
Just Another Gangsta (with Birdman)	Released: March 29, 2019; Label: Cash Money; Format: CD, digital download	—	—	—

=== Compilation albums ===
List of compilation albums, with selected chart positions
Title	Album details	Peak chart positions		
Title	Album details	US	US R&B	US Rap
Playaz of da Game	Released: September 26, 2000; Label: D-3	—	78	—
The Greatest Hits	Released: October 19, 2004; Labels: UTP, Cash Money	31	9	5
Raw	Released: May 23, 2005; Label: Digital Musicworks	—	—	—
"—" denotes a recording that did not chart.

== Mixtapes ==
- 2007: Rejuvenated (bootleg)
- 2009: Uptown Nolia Boy
- 2009: Undefeated
- 2012: Mardi Gras
- 2012: Nino The Magnificent
- 2012: Juvie Tuesday
- 2015: Mardi Gras 2

== Singles ==
=== As lead artist ===
List of singles as a lead artist, with selected chart positions and certifications, showing year released and album name
Title	Year	Peak chart positions					Certifications	Album
Title	Year	US	US R&B	US Rap	US Rhyth.	AUS	Certifications	Album
"Conversation with the Man Above"	1995	—	—	—	—	—		Being Myself
"Solja Rag"	1997	—	—	—	—	—		Solja Rags
"Ha"	1998	68	16	11	30	—		400 Degreez
"Down Bottom" (with Drag-On)	1999	— (Note: "Down Bottom" did not enter the Billboard Hot 100, but peaked at number 18 on the Bubbling Under Hot 100 Singles chart.)	43	5	—	—		Ryde or Die Vol. 1
"Back That Azz Up" (featuring Lil Wayne and Mannie Fresh)	1999	19	5	9	3	—	RIAA: 3× Platinum	400 Degreez
"Follow Me Now"	1999	—	63	—	—	—		400 Degreez
"U Understand"	1999	83	27	—	—	—		Tha G-Code
"I Got That Fire" (featuring Mannie Fresh)	2000	—	62	—	—	—		Tha G-Code
"Project Bitch" (with Big Tymers & Lil Wayne)	2000							Baller Blockin' (soundtrack)
"Set It Off"	2001	65	19	18	24	—		Project English
"Mamma Got Ass"	2001	65	27	—	28	—		Project English
"In My Life" (featuring Mannie Fresh)	2003	46	18	13	40	—		Juve the Great
"Bounce Back" (featuring Birdman)	2003	—	85	—	—	—		Juve the Great
"Slow Motion" (featuring Soulja Slim)	2004	1	2	1	1	61	RIAA: Gold	Juve the Great
"Nolia Clap" (with Wacko and Skip)	2004	31	9	9	—	—		The Beginning of the End
"Rodeo"	2006	41	12	7	19	—	RIAA: Gold	Reality Check
"What's Happenin'"	2006	—	56	25	—	—		Reality Check
"Way I Be Leanin'" (featuring Mike Jones, Paul Wall, Skip and Wacko)	2006	—	118	—	—	—		Reality Check
"Gotta Get It"	2009	—	53	23	—	—		Cocky & Confident
"We Be Getting Money" (featuring Shawty Lo, Dorrough and Kango Slim)	2009	—	—	—	—	—		Cocky & Confident
"Drop That Thang"	2010	—	74	—	—	—		Beast Mode
"Power" (featuring Rick Ross)	2011	—	—	—	—	—		Rejuvenation
"Pay tha Rent" (featuring Young Jeezy and Yo Gotti)	2013	—	—	—	—	—		The Fundamentals
"Dreams" (with Birdman, featuring NLE Choppa)	2019	—	—	—	—	—		Just Another Gangsta
"Broke" (with Birdman)	2019	—	—	—	—	—		Just Another Gangsta
"Ride Dat" (with Birdman, featuring Lil Wayne)	2019	—	—	—	—	—		Non-album singles
"Buss It Down" (with NR)	2021	—	—	—	—	—		Non-album singles
"MoonRoof" (with Bro Ivory)	2021	—	—	—	—	—		Non-album singles
"Do It Big" (with Roy Jones Jr. & Sm Bullett)	2021	—	—	—	—	—		Non-album singles
"Ali" (with Birdman)	2022	—	—	—	—	—		Non-album singles
"Crack of Dat Ass" (with Lavish Caminshion)	2022	—	—	—	—	—		Non-album singles
"Freak Sum" (with Drumma Boy & T-Rell)	2023	—	—	—	—	—		Non-album singles
"I Need You"	2023	—	—	—	—	—		Non-album singles
"Down Bitch" (with Young Juve & OgPurpin)	2024	—	—	—	—	—		Non-album singles
"Goodbye" (with Subtweet Shawn & Chance the Rapper)	2025	—	—	—	—	—		Non-album singles
"Hotboy Summer" (featuring B.G., Jacquees, & Trombone Shorty)	2025	—	—	—	—	—		Boiling Point
"He Gone" (featuring Mannie Fresh and Dee-1)	2025	—	—	—	—	—		Boiling Point
"One More Round" (feat. 2'Live Bre)	2025	—	—	—	—	—		Boiling Point
"B.B.B." (with Genesisthegawd or Megan Thee Stallion)	2026	67	16	7	—	—		Boiling Point
"—" denotes a recording that did not chart or was not released in that territory.

=== As featured artist ===
List of singles as a featured artist, with selected chart positions, showing year released and album name
Title	Year	Peak chart positions				Album
Title	Year	US	US R&B	US Rap	US Rhyth.	Album
"I Ain't the One" (Profyle featuring Juvenile)	1999	—	65	—	—	Whispers in the Dark
"Tha Block Is Hot" (Lil Wayne featuring Juvenile and B.G.)	1999	72	24	27	—	Tha Block Is Hot
"Respect Us" (Lil Wayne featuring Juvenile)	1999	—	—	—	—	Tha Block Is Hot
"Number One Stunna" (Big Tymers featuring Juvenile and Lil Wayne)	2000	105	24	—	—	I Got That Work
"Put Yo Sets Up" (Redd Eyezz featuring Juvenile and Slanted Eyezz)	2001	—	81	5	—	Eyezz of the Storm
"What You Doin' Wit Dat" (NAAM Brigade featuring Juvenile)	2003	—	116	—	—	Early in the Game
"We Got That" (Coo Coo Cal featuring Juvenile)	2005	—	75	—	—	Non-album single
"Boom" (Mario featuring Juvenile)	2005	—	—	—	23	Turning Point
"Ya Heard Me" (B.G. featuring Trey Songz, Juvenile and Lil Wayne)	2008	—	—	—	—	Too Hood 2 Be Hollywood
"Pop It 4 Pimp" (Bun B featuring Juvenile and Webbie)	2008	—	115	—	—	II Trill
"New Warleans (Like It's Friday)" (Kidd Kidd featuring Juvenile)	2012	—	—	—	—	Street Fame
"Muscle" (Low Pros featuring Juvenile)	2014	—	—	—	—	Low Pros EP 1
"Sho Me Love" (Rich Gang featuring Drake and Juvenile)	2014	—	—	—	—	Rich Gang 2
"Throw Fits" (G-Eazy and London on da Track featuring City Girls and Juvenile)	2019	—	— (Note: "Throw Fits" did not enter the Hot R&B/Hip-Hop Songs chart, but peaked at number 49 on the R&B/Hip-Hop Airplay chart.)	—	32	Non-album single
"—" denotes a recording that did not chart or was not released in that territory.

== Other charted songs ==
List of songs, with selected chart positions, showing year released and album name
Title	Year	Peak chart positions	Album
Title	Year	US R&B	Album
"Sets Go Up" (featuring Wacko)	2005	113	Reality Check

== Guest appearances ==
List of non-single guest appearances, with other performing artists, showing year released and album name
Title	Year	Other artist(s)	Album
"Retaliation"	1996	B.G., Bun B, Ms.Tee	Chopper City
"Round My Way"	1997	B.G.	It's All on U, Vol. 1
"Hot Boys 226"	1997	B.G., U.N.L.V., Lil Wayne	It's All on U, Vol. 2
"I'm Try'n"	1997	B.G., Lil Wayne	It's All on U, Vol. 2
"Cutlass, Monte Carlo's & Regals"	1998	Big Tymers	How You Luv That
"Try'n 2 Make a Million"	1998	Big Tymers	How You Luv That
"Ride (Down South)"	1999	Foxy Brown, 8Ball & MJG, Too $hort	Chyna Doll
"Knockout"	1999	B.G.	Chopper City in the Ghetto
"Dog Ass"	1999	B.G.	Chopper City in the Ghetto
"Niggaz in Trouble"	1999	B.G.	Chopper City in the Ghetto
"Make 'Em Break It"	1999	Lil Keke, Birdman, Turk	It Was All a Dream
"25 to Life"	1999	Xzibit, Reptile, Prodigy, Juvenile, Nature	Life (soundtrack)
"Flaw Boyz"	1999	Jim Crow	Crow's Nest
"U Can't Resist"	1999	Missy Elliott, B.G.	Da Real World
"Play That Shit"	1999	Noreaga, Lil Wayne, Musalini Maze, Goldfingaz	Melvin Flynt – Da Hustler
"Look at Me"	1999	E-40, Birdman, B.G., Lil Wayne	Charlie Hustle: The Blueprint of a Self-Made Millionaire
"It's Like That"	1999	Cha Cha, Trick Daddy, Jim Crow	Dear Diary
"Enemy Turf"	1999	Lil Wayne	Tha Block Is Hot
"Snoopy Track"	1999	Jay-Z	Vol. 3... Life and Times of S. Carter
"Respect"	1999	Funkmaster Flex & Big Kap, LIl Wayne, B.G.	The Tunnel
"Baller Blockin'"	2000	Big Tymers, Turk, E40	Baller Blockin' (soundtrack)
"Hard Life"	2000	Big Tymers, Lil Wayne	I Got That Work
"We Hustle"	2000	Big Tymers, Turk, B.G.	I Got That Work
"Rover Truck"	2000	—N/a	Baller Blockin' (soundtrack)
"Get in Line"	2000	B.G.	Checkmate
"Bounce It"	2001	JD	Puttin-N-Wurk
"Holla at My Thugs"	2001	Usual Suspects	Reality World
"Settle the Score"	2001	Mystikal	Tarantula
"Make dat Azz Clap"	2002	Project Pat	Layin' da Smack Down
"I Can Do Dat" (Remix)	2002	Lil' Flip, Skip	Undaground Legend
"Yes Sir"	2003	DJ Envy, Coke, Petey Pablo	The Desert Storm Mixtape: Blok Party, Vol. 1
"Ten Toes Down"	2003	Lil Wyte	Doubt Me Now
"Back Up"	2003	Big Tymers, Gillie da Kid	Big Money Heavyweight
"Nice Change"	2004	Pastor Troy, Lil Pete	By Any Means Necessary
"Point 'Em Out"	2004	I-20	Self Explanatory
"Don't Start It"	2004	Body Head Bangerz	Body Head Bangerz: Volume One
"Salt Shaker" (Remix)	2004	Ying Yang Twins, Lil Jon, Murphy Lee, Fat Joe, Fatman Scoop, Jacki-O, B.G., Pitbull	My Brother & Me
"Pop Off"	2004	San Quinn, Keak da Sneak	I Give You My Word
"Watcha Gonna Do?"	2005	Brian McKnight, Akon, Skip	Gemini
"Who Need a B"	2005	Bun B, Too $hort	Trill
"Out Here"	2005	Twista, Speedknot Mobstaz	The Day After
"Ceo Stacks"	2005	JT the Bigga Figga, Phats Bossi	Neighborhood Supastarz
"Gotta Get It"	2005	JT the Bigga Figga, Young Buck	Neighborhood Supastarz
"Dangerous Minds"	2005	JT the Bigga Figga, Skip	Neighborhood Supastarz
"Gotta Make It" (Remix)	2005	Trey Songz, Aretha Franklin	I Gotta Make It
"Pimp Hard"	2006	Scarface, Partners-N-Crime	My Homies Part 2
"Crunk In The Club"	2006	Eurika	
"From the Corner to the Block"	2007	Galactic, Soul Rebels Brass Band	From the Corner to the Block
"All Night (Excuse Me)"	2007	Ali & Gipp, Nelly, Avery Storm	Kinfolk
"Dangerous Minds"	2007	Young Buck, JT the Bigga Figga, Skip	They Don't Bother Me
"Gotta Get It"	2007	Young Buck	They Don't Bother Me
"Pimpin' Don't Fail Me Now"	2007	8Ball & MJG, Jazze Pha	Ridin High
"Independent"	2008	El Demonio	Born Again
"Gotta Get It"	2009	DJ Drama, B.G., Soulja Slim	Gangsta Grillz: The Album (Vol. 2)
"That'll Work"	2009	The Alchemist, Three 6 Mafia	Chemical Warfare
"Bricks"	2009	D Boyz	Life of a D-Boy
"Got 2 Have It"	2009	D Boyz, Mannie Fresh	Life of a D-Boy
"Hustla"	2011	WC, Dion Primo	Revenge of the Barracuda
"Throwback"	2012	August Alsina	Throwback EP
"The Man in My City"	2012	Dee-1, Mannie Fresh	The Focus Tape
"100 Grand"	2012	Iamsu!, Kool John	$uzy 6 $peed
"Bitch Get Up"	2013	Currensy	New Jet City
"Uptown"	2013	Mack Maine, Nesby Phips, Reem	Freestyle 102: No Pens or Pads
"100 Grand"	2013	Problem, Iamsu!, Kool John	Million Dollar Afro
"Zip It"	2013	Turk, Lil Wayne, B.G.	Blame It on The System
"Fast Life"	2013	Turk, B.G.	Blame It on The System
"Man in My City"	2013	Turk, Mannie Fresh, Dee-1	Blame It on The System
"2 Things U Can't Come Back From"	2013	Philthy Rich	Not Enough Real Niggas Left 2
"Fast Life"	2013	Turk	Louisianimalz
"Mo Money"	2013	Currensy, Young Roddy	Bales
"Survival"	2015	DJ EFN, Trick Daddy, dead prez.	Who's Time?
"Aintchu"	2015	Future	Beast Mode
"Emerald / Burgandy"	2019	Chris Brown, Juicy J	Indigo

== Music videos ==
List of music videos as a lead artist, with directors, showing year released
Title	Year	Director(s)
"Ha"	1998	Marc Klasfeld
"Back That Azz Up" (featuring Lil Wayne and Mannie Fresh)	1999	Dave Meyers
"Follow Me Now"	1999	Marc Klasfeld
"U Understand"	1999	Dave Meyers
"I Got That Fire" (featuring Mannie Fresh)	2000	Nick Quested
"Set It Off"	2001	
"From Her Mamma (Mamma Got Ass)"	2001	David Palmer
"In My Life"	2003	
"Bounce Back"	2003	
"Slow Motion" (featuring Soulja Slim)	2004	Life Garland
"Nolia Clap"	2004	
"Rodeo"	2006	Marc Klasfeld
"Way I Be Leanin'" (featuring Mike Jones, Paul Wall, Skip and Wacko)	2006	Dr. Teeth
"400 Degreez"	2024	Diesel FIlmz

== See also ==
- Cash Money Millionaires discography
- Hot Boys discography
- UTP discography
