= The Greatest Hits (Juvenile album) =

Greatest hits album by Juvenile
- Released: October 19, 2004
- Recorded: 1996–2003
- Studios: Cash Money Studios (New Orleans, LA); Studio Center (Miami, FL); Circle House Studios (Miami, FL)
- Genres: Southern hip-hop; gangsta rap; bounce
- Length: 1:18:16
- Labels: Cash Money; Universal
- Producers: Mannie Fresh; Dani Kartel

Juvenile chronology
The Beginning of the End... (2004)	The Greatest Hits (2004)	Reality Check (2006)

Professional ratings
Review scores
Source	Rating
AllMusic	4.5/5 stars
PopMatters	5/10
RapReviews	5/10

The Greatest Hits is the first greatest hits album by American rapper Juvenile. It was released on October 19, 2004, via Cash Money/Universal Records. Recording sessions took place at Cash Money Studios in New Orleans, Studio Center and Circle House Studios in Miami. Production was handled by Mannie Fresh and Dani Kartel, with Baby and Slim serving as executive producers. It features guest appearances from the Cash Money Millionaires, Papa Reu, Soulja Slim, Wyclef Jean and Ying Yang Twins. The album peaked at number 31 on the Billboard 200, number 9 on the Top R&B/Hip-Hop Albums and number 5 on the Top Rap Albums in the United States.

== Track listing ==
No.	Title	Writer(s)	Producer(s)	Length
1.	"Intro - Big Tymers"	Bryan Williams; Byron Thomas	Mannie Fresh	2:12
2.	"Slow Motion" (featuring Soulja Slim)	Terius Gray; James Tapp; Daniel Castillo	Dani Kartel	4:08
3.	"Ha"	Gray; Thomas	Mannie Fresh	4:52
4.	"Back That Azz Up" (featuring Mannie Fresh and Lil' Wayne)	Gray; Thomas; Dwayne Carter	Mannie Fresh	4:25
5.	"Set It Off"	Gray; Thomas	Mannie Fresh	4:17
6.	"In My Life" (featuring Mannie Fresh)	Gray; Thomas	Mannie Fresh	5:45
7.	"Slow Motion RMX" (featuring Wyclef Jean and Ying-Yang Twins)	Gray; Wyclef Jean; Eric Jackson; D'eongelo Holmes; Castillo	Dani Kartel	4:08
8.	"Back That Thing Up" (featuring Mannie Fresh and Lil' Wayne)	Gray; Thomas; Carter	Mannie Fresh	4:33
9.	"Bounce Back" (featuring Birdman)	Gray; Thomas; Larry Blackmon	Mannie Fresh	4:13
10.	"U Understand"	Gray; Thomas	Mannie Fresh	4:19
11.	"Mamma Got Ass"	Gray; Thomas	Mannie Fresh	4:27
12.	"400 Degreez"	Gray; Thomas	Mannie Fresh	4:09
13.	"I Got That Fire" (featuring Mannie Fresh)	Gray; Thomas	Mannie Fresh	4:28
14.	"Juvenile on Fire"	Gray; Thomas	Mannie Fresh	4:57
15.	"Rich Niggaz" (featuring Turk, Lil' Wayne and Papa Reu)	Gray; Tab Virgil; Carter; Reuben Nero; Thomas	Mannie Fresh	5:03
16.	"Never Had Shit" (featuring Big Tymers, B.G. and Turk)	Gray; Williams; Thomas; Christopher Dorsey; Virgil	Mannie Fresh	4:13
17.	"Lil Boyz" (featuring Big Tymers and Lil' Wayne)	Gray; Williams; Thomas; Carter	Mannie Fresh	4:12
18.	"Follow Me Now"	Gray; Thomas; Ernest Anthony Puente Jr.	Mannie Fresh	3:55
Total length:				1:18:16

Sample credits

- Track 9 contains elements from "Why Have I Lost You" written by Larry Blackmon and performed by Cameo.
- Track 18 contains an interpolation of "Oye Cómo Va" written by Tito Puente.

Notes

- Tracks 1, 3, 4, 12, 14, 15 and 18 are taken from 400 Degreez (1998)
- Tracks 10, 13, 16 and 17 are taken from Tha G-Code (1999)
- Tracks 5 and 11 are taken from Project English (2001)
- Tracks 2, 6 and 9 are taken from Juve the Great (2003)

== Personnel ==
- Terius "Juvenile" Gray — vocals (tracks: 2–18), mixing (tracks: 2, 7)
- Bryan "Baby"/"Birdman" Williams — vocals (tracks: 1, 9, 16, 17), executive producer
- Byron "Mannie Fresh" Thomas — vocals (tracks: 1, 4, 6, 8, 13, 16, 17), keyboards (tracks: 10, 11, 13, 16, 17), producer (tracks: 1, 3–6, 8–18), recording (tracks: 1, 3–5, 8, 12–15, 18), mixing (tracks: 1, 3–5, 8, 10–18), engineering (tracks: 5, 10, 11, 13, 16, 17)
- James "Soulja Slim" Tapp Jr. — vocals (track 2)
- Dwayne "Lil Wayne" Carter — vocals (tracks: 4, 8, 15, 17)
- Wyclef Jean — vocals (track 7)
- Eric "Kaine" Jackson — vocals (track 7)
- D'eongelo "D-Roc" Holmes — vocals (track 7)
- Tab "Turk" Virgil Jr. — vocals (tracks: 15, 16)
- Reuben "Papa Reu" Nero — vocals (track 15)
- Christopher "B.G." Dorsey — vocals (track 16)
- Corey "Funky Fingers" Stoot — guitar (tracks: 3, 4, 8, 12, 14, 15, 18), bass (tracks: 3, 4, 8, 12, 14, 15, 18)
- Terrence "Barewolf" Williams — keyboards (tracks: 3, 4, 8, 12, 14, 15, 18), keyboards assistant (tracks: 10, 13, 16, 17)
- Rick Marcel — lead bass (tracks: 5, 10, 11, 13, 16, 17)
- Daniel "Dani Kartel" Castillo — producer (tracks: 2, 7)
- Dave Junco — recording & mixing (tracks: 2, 7)
- Ray Seay — mixing & engineering (tracks: 5, )
- Abebe Lewis — recording (track 6)
- Brian Stanley — mixing (tracks: 6, 9)
- Ryan Evans — recording assistant (track 6)
- Adrian Santalla — recording (track 9)
- Jason Nieves — recording assistant (track 9)
- Ronald "Slim" Williams — executive producer
- Joe Spix — art direction, design
- Sandy Brummels — creative director
- Russel Neblett — A&R

== Charts ==
Chart (2004)	Peak position
US Billboard 200	31
US Top R&B/Hip-Hop Albums (Billboard)	9
US Top Rap Albums (Billboard)	5
