= Back Like We Left Something =

Studio album by UTP
- Released: July 24, 2007
- Recorded: 2006–2007
- Genres: Southern hip-hop, gangsta rap
- Labels: J. Prince; Rap-a-Lot 4 Life; Asylum
- Producers: Mike Dean, Polow da Don, Myke Diesel, Bigg Tyme, Sinista, Pha, Cory Mo

UTP chronology
Nolia Clap (2004)	Back Like We Left Something (2007)

Back Like We Left Something is the second and final full-length studio album by UTP. It is their fourth release overall including the 2002 compilation The Compilation and 2004 EP Nolia Clap, released on July 24, 2007 through Rap-a-Lot Records.

== Background ==
The album was released over three years after The Beginning of the End. By the time of the album's release group founder Juvenile had left the group, leaving UTP as a duo consisting of Wacko and Skip. However, Juvenile still contributed verses to four tracks on the album, "Damn Nigga Damn", "Loaded Up", "1st Piece" and "Gang Bang".

Chartwise, the album was an improvement over their last release Nolia Clap, peaking at 52 on the Billboard Top R&B/Hip-Hop Albums. However it failed to reach the Billboard 200 or produce any hit singles like The Beginning of the End did.

== Track listing ==
No.	Title	Producer(s)	Length
1.	"Intro"	Sinista	0:33
2.	"Uptown"	Sinista	4:14
3.	"Damn Nigga Damn" (featuring Juvenile)	Sinista	4:31
4.	"Do What Cha Wanna" (featuring Lil Wayne)	Pha	4:30
5.	"Straight 2 Da Money" (featuring Kaotic)	II Deep Muzic	4:24
6.	"Mr. Nolia Clap (Back Again)"	Cory Mo	3:59
7.	"Loaded Up" (featuring Juvenile)	Sinista	4:06
8.	"Hustle Hard"	A.D. Future, Pha	4:27
9.	"Give It Up" (featuring Trae)	Mike Dean	4:27
10.	"Rap Dream"	Pha	3:23
11.	"Sticky Icky" (featuring Devin the Dude)	Sinista	4:15
12.	"Who's Your Daddy"	Myke Diesel	3:50
13.	"1st Piece" (featuring Rich Boy and Juvenile)	Polow da Don	5:30
14.	"20 Dollars"	Sinista	3:45
15.	"Dope Money"	Bigg Tyme	3:51
16.	"Gang Bang" (featuring Juvenile)	Sinista	3:23
17.	"Let Me Roll On You" (featuring Prada)	A.D. Future	3:57
18.	"Get Em Monster"	Sinista	4:31
19.	"Live It Up (Came 2 Far)"	Sinista	3:56

- Juvenile is credited as a featured artist as he was not a UTP member at the time of the album's release.

== Charts ==
Chart (2007)	Peak position
Billboard Top R&B/Hip-Hop	52

== Personnel ==
- Pharren ‘Pha’ Lowther - Producer, Engineer, Audio Production
- Cory Mo - Audio Production
- Mike Dean - Producer, Audio Production
- Myke Diesel - Producer, Audio Production
- II Deep Muzik - Audio Production
- Sinista - Producer, Audio Production
- Bigg Tyme - Audio Production
- Polow da Don - Audio Production
- Tony Randle - A&R
- Sinista - Audio Production
