= Raw (Juvenile album) =

2005 compilation album by Juvenile

Compilation album by Juvenile
- Released: May 23, 2005
- Recorded: 2004–2005
- Genre: Bounce
- Label: Digital Musicworks International
- Producer: Cool and Dre; Scott Storch; Mannie Fresh; Lil Jon; Sinista

Juvenile chronology
The Greatest Hits (2004)	Raw (2005)	Reality Check (2006)

Raw is a 2005 compilation album by rapper Juvenile. It features mostly songs the rapper made before his 1997 signing with Cash Money Records. The album was released digitally on the May 23, 2005. Popular singles include "Bounce For The Juvenile", "Yeah F***in' Right" and "Got It Going On".

== Track listing ==
1. "Bounce For The Juvenile"
2. "Yeah Fuckin' Right"
3. "Fuckin' Right (Remix)"
4. "Nigga Rigged"
5. "Jivin'"
6. "A Little Sumtn' In Sumtn'"
7. "Krooked Kops"
8. "Got It Going On"
9. "New Orleans Bounce"
10. "Hoz Ain't Nuthin' But Hoz"
11. "Where They At"
12. "Where They At (Remix)"
