= Nolia Clap (EP) =

EP by UTP
- Released: November 23, 2004
- Recorded: 2003–04
- Studios: Dean's List House Hits (Houston, TX); Stone House (Los Angeles, CA); Studio Center (Miami, FL); UTP Studios (New Orleans, LA)
- Genres: Southern hip-hop; gangsta rap
- Length: 30:39
- Labels: UTP; Rap-A-Lot 4 Life; Asylum
- Producers: J. Prince (exec.); Juvenile (also exec.); Derek "Grizz" Edwards; Donald "XL" Robertson; Mike Dean; Slice Tee

UTP chronology
The Beginning of the End... (2004)	Nolia Clap (2004)	Back Like We Left Something (2007)

Singles from Nolia Clap
- 1. "Nolia Clap" Released: August 31, 2004; 2. "What's Up" Released: 2004

Professional ratings
Review scores
Source	Rating
RapReviews	8/10

Nolia Clap is the only extended play by American hip-hop group UTP. It was released on November 23, 2004, through Rap-A-Lot Records. Recording sessions took place at Dean's List House Hits in Houston, at Stone House in Los Angeles, at Studio Center in Miami, and at UTP Studios in New Orleans. Production was handled by Derek "Grizz" Edwards, Donald "XL" Robertson, Mike Dean, Slice Tee and Juvenile. It features guest appearances from Kango, Bun B, Earl Hayes, Hot Wright, Red Eye, Slim Thug, T.I. and Z-Ro.

After the success of UTP's single "Nolia Clap", Rap-A-Lot released a seven-track EP to capitalize on the single's success. It contained both the original version on "Nolia Clap", a new remix of the song, and a few unreleased tracks that did not make the cut for The Beginning of the End.... The EP did not fare as well as the single however, and only reached number 65 on the Billboard Top R&B/Hip-Hop Albums.

== Track listing ==
No.	Title	Writer(s)	Producer(s)	Length
1.	"Don't Want No Static" (featuring Kango Slim)	Terius Gray; Damon Grison; Walter Williams; Michael Dean	Juvenile; Mike Dean	3:20
2.	"What's Up" (featuring Kango Slim)	Gray; Grison; Clifford Nicholas; Williams; Sheldon Arrington	Slice Tee; Juvenile	3:52
3.	"Gangsta" (featuring Redd Eyezz)	Gray; J. Pierce; Derek Edwards; Dean	Derek "Grizz" Edwards; Mike Dean	3:59
4.	"Nolia Clap"	Gray; Grison; Nicholas; Donald Robertson	Donald "XL" Robertson	4:30
5.	"What's Your Brains Like" (featuring Kango Slim)	Gray; Grison; Nicholas; Arrington	Slice Tee; Juvenile	5:21
6.	"Hurt Somethin'"	Gray; Edwards	Derek "Grizz" Edwards	4:43
7.	"Nolia Clap (Re-Remix)" (featuring Z-Ro, Bun B, Earl Hayes, Slim Thug, T.I. and Hot Wright)	Gray; Grison; Joseph McVey; Bernard Freeman; Earl Hayes; Stayve Thomas; Clifford Harris; Hot Wright; Robertson	Donald "XL" Robertson; Juvenile	4:54
Total length:				30:39

== Personnel ==
- Terius "Juvenile" Gray – main artist, producer (tracks: 1, 2, 5, 7), mixing, executive producer, A&R
- Damon "Wacko" Grison – main artist
- Clifford "Skip" Nicholas – main artist
- Walter "Kango" Williams – featured artist (tracks: 1, 2, 5)
- Red Eye – featured artist (track 3)
- Joseph "Z-Ro" McVey – featured artist (track 13)
- Bernard "Bun B" Freeman – featured artist (track 14)
- Earl Hayes – featured artist (track 14)
- Stayve "Slim Thug" Thomas – featured artist (track 14)
- Clifford "T.I." Harris – featured artist (track 14)
- Hot Wright – featured artist (track 14)
- Michael Dean – producer (tracks: 1, 3), mixing, mastering
- Sheldon "Slice Tee" Arrington – producer (tracks: 2, 5)
- Derek "Grizz" Edwards – producer (tracks: 3, 6)
- Donald "XL" Robertson – producer (tracks: 4, 7)
- James Prince – executive producer
- Dave Junco – engineering, mixing
- John "JP" Pegram – engineering
- Anzel "Int'l Red" Jennings – A&R
- Tony "Big Chief" Randle – A&R supervisor
- Paul Francis – project administrator
- Mark Hayes – art direction, design
- Tom Phillips – photography

== Charts ==
Chart (2004)	Peak position
US Top R&B/Hip-Hop Albums (Billboard)	65
