= The Compilation =

The Compilation may refer to:

- The Compilation (20 Fingers album), 1995
- The Compilation (UTP album), 2002
