= Playaz of da Game =

Compilation album by Juvenile
- Released: September 26, 2000
- Recorded: 1992–96
- Studio: Sound Services Studio (New Orleans, LA)
- Genre: Bounce
- Length: 49:58
- Label: D3 Entertainment
- Producer: Derrick "Mellow Fellow" Ordogne; Leroy "Precise" Edwards; "The Devious One" Dion Norman

Juvenile chronology
Tha G-Code (1999)	Playaz of da Game (2000)	Project English (2001)

Professional ratings
Review scores
Source	Rating
AllMusic	1.5/5 stars
Vibe	2/5 marks

Playaz of da Game is a compilation album by American rapper Juvenile featuring DJ Jimi. It was released on September 26, 2000, via D3 Entertainment, and is compiled of Juvenile's songs recorded before he was signed with Ca$h Money Records. The album peaked at #78 on the Billboard Top R&B/Hip-Hop Albums and #21 on the Independent Albums charts in the United States.

The song "Got It Going On" was listed in Vibe magazine as one of, if not the most, uses of the word "nigga" in one song. The tally totals 416 mentions.

== Track listing ==
No.	Title	Writer(s)	Producer(s)	Length
1.	"Jivin'"	Terius Gray; Linda Johnson	Leroy "Precise" Edwards	3:40
2.	"A Little Sumtn' in Sumtn'"	Jimi Payton; Johnson	Leroy "Precise" Edwards	4:42
3.	"Bounce for the Juvenile"	Gray; Edwards	Leroy "Precise" Edwards	4:40
4.	"Yeah Fuckin' Right"	Gray; Payton; Johnson	Leroy "Precise" Edwards	6:02
5.	"Krooked Kops"	Payton; Johnson	Leroy "Precise" Edwards	3:09
6.	"Got It Going On"	Payton; Edwards	Leroy "Precise" Edwards	4:05
7.	"New Orleans Bounce"	Gray		4:21
8.	"Hoz Ain't Nuthin' But Hoz"	Payton	Leroy "Precise" Edwards	3:38
9.	"Where They At"	Payton; Dion Norman; Derrick Robert Ordogne	Devious D; Mellow Fellow	3:31
10.	"Fuckin' Right (Remix)"	Gray; Payton		6:02
11.	"Nigga Rigged"	Payton; Johnson	Leroy "Precise" Edwards	2:07
12.	"Where They At (Remix)"	Payton; Norman; Ordogne	Devious D; Mellow Fellow	4:01
Total length:				49:58

Notes

- Tracks 1, 2, 4, 5, 8 and 11 originally appeared on D.J. Jimi's 1994 album I'm Back! I'm Back! for Gamtown Records Inc.
- Tracks 3, 6, 9 and 12 originally appeared on D.J. Jimi's 1992 album It's Jimi for Soulin' Records

== Charts ==
Chart (2000)	Peak position
US Top R&B/Hip-Hop Albums (Billboard)	78
US Independent Albums (Billboard)	21
