= What's Happening =

What's Happening or What's Happenin' may refer to:

- What's Happening (album), by Katalyst, 2007
- What's Happening? (EP), by B1A4, 2013
- What's Happening!!, an American television sitcom that aired on ABC from 1976 to 1979
  - What's Happening Now!!, a sequel that first aired on ABC from 1985 to 1988
- "What's Happenin!", a song by Ying Yang Twins
- "What's Happenin'" (Juvenile song), 2006
- "What's Happenin'" (Method Man song), 2004
- "What's Happenin" (Psychic Fever song), 2025
- "What's Happening?!?!", a song by the Byrds from Fifth Dimension, 1966
- "What's Happening", a song by OsamaSon from Psykotic

== See also ==
- What Happened (disambiguation)
- "What Is Happening", a song by Alphabeat from their self-titled album (2007)
