= Got to Get It =

Got to Get It may refer to:

- "Got to Get It" (Culture Beat song), 1993
- "Got to Get It" (Sisqó song), 1999
- Got to Get It!, a 1967 album by Bobby Timmons
- "Got to Get It", a song by Paul Wall from the album Fast Life

== See also ==
- Gotta Get It, a collaboration album by Juvenile and JT the Bigga Figga
