= Pay for It =

Pay for It may refer to:

- "Pay for It (Jay Rock song)", 2014
- "Pay for It", a 2008 song by Mindless Self Indulgence from their album If
- "Pay for It", a 2016 song by Rebecca Ferguson from her album Superwoman
- "I'll Pay For It", a 2003 song by Soulja Slim from his album Years Later...A Few Months After
- "Payforit", a mobile payment provider in the UK
