= Mamma Got Ass =

2001 single by Juvenile

Single by Juvenile

from the album Project English
- Released: 2001
- Genre: Southern hip hop
- Length: 4:29
- Label: Cash Money; Universal
- Songwriter(s): Terius Gray
- Producer(s): Mannie Fresh

Juvenile singles chronology
"Set It Off" (2001)	"Mamma Got Ass" (2001)	"What You Doin' Wit Dat" (2002)

Music video
- "Mamma Got Ass" on YouTube

"Mamma Got Ass" (also titled as "From Her Mama (Mama Got Ass)") is a song by American rapper Juvenile and the second single from his fifth studio album Project English (2001).

== Content ==
Lyrically, the song focuses on the characteristics of women in Juvenile's life, which he claims they inherited from their mothers.

== Critical reception ==
Steve "Flash" Juon of RapReviews wrote favorably of the song, describing it as "humerously narrative [sic]".

== Charts ==
Chart (2001–2002)	Peak position
US Billboard Hot 100	65
US Hot R&B/Hip-Hop Songs (Billboard)	27
US Rhythmic (Billboard)	28
