= Slow Motion (Juvenile song) =

2004 single by Juvenile featuring Soulja Slim

Single by Juvenile featuring Soulja Slim

from the album Juve the Great
- Released: March 1, 2004
- Recorded: 2003
- Genre: Dirty rap
- Length: 4:08
- Label: Cash Money; Universal
- Songwriters: Terius Gray; James Tapp, Jr.
- Producer: Dani Kartel

Juvenile singles chronology
| "Bounce Back" (2003) | "Slow Motion" (2004) | "Nolia Clap" (2004) |

Music video
- "Slow Motion" on YouTube

"Slow Motion" is a song by American rapper Juvenile featuring fellow American rapper Soulja Slim. It was released as a single on March 1, 2004 and is Juvenile's and Soulja Slim's only number one hit on the U.S. Billboard Hot 100. The song is an original production by Dani Kartel. It held the number one position on the Billboard Hot 100 for two weeks from August 7, 2004, and was the first number one for both Juvenile and Soulja Slim. It was the seventh song to reach number one posthumously for a credited artist, following "Mo Money Mo Problems" by The Notorious B.I.G. in 1997, and was also the first number one hit for Cash Money Records.

== Background and content ==
Although not planned as a tribute, "Slow Motion" came out as one of the more popular posthumous songs because of Soulja Slim's sudden death in November 2003, before the recording process was released (though the beat and lyrics had already been recorded by Soulja).

The "slow motion" of the title is the movement of a woman's body, with the lyrics proclaiming: "Uh, I like it like that / She working that back; I don't know how to act / Slow motion for me, slow motion for me / Slow motion for me; move it slow motion for me".

According to Billboard, the song is about sex.

== Critical reception ==
Cleveland.com commented that "Slow Motion" has "one of the catchiest choruses of any hip-hop song of the [2000s] decade".

== Music video ==
In the video, everyone wears black T-shirts with R.I.P. Soulja Slim in white text on the front and back. There are also people holding Thou shall not kill paperboard signs. In the middle of the video there are cameo appearances by the rappers Birdman and Lil Wayne, signalling the end of animosity between Juvenile and Cash Money.

== Remixes ==
- "Slow Motion" official remix featuring Ying Yang Twins and Wyclef Jean from Juvenile's The Greatest Hits compilation.
- “Slow Motion” was remade and sample by singer Nivea featuring rapper Rasheeda titled as “You Like It Like That” which charted 86 on the Billboard Hot R&B/Hip Hop Songs chart in 2004.
- "Slow Motion Megamix", featuring Wyclef Jean, Soulja Slim, Ying Yang Twins, UTP and Bun B.
- "Slow Motion" was sampled by the American singer Kesha, in her song of the same title, featuring Three 6 Mafia. Though planned to be on her 2010 debut album Animal, it was scrapped from the record and remains an unreleased track.
- "Kill Tonight" featured on Tyga's 2009 mixtape Black Thoughts.
- "Slow Motion" remix featuring August Alsina from his 2012 EP August Alsina University.

== Charts and certifications ==
=== Weekly charts ===
| Chart (2004) | Peak position |
|---|---|
| Australia (ARIA) | 61 |
| Australian Urban (ARIA) | 16 |
| Canada CHR/Pop Top 30 (Radio & Records) | 11 |
| US Billboard Hot 100 | 1 |
| US Hot R&B/Hip-Hop Songs (Billboard) | 2 |
| US Hot Rap Songs (Billboard) | 1 |
| US Pop Airplay (Billboard) | 10 |
| US Rhythmic Airplay (Billboard) | 1 |

=== Year-end charts ===
| Chart (2004) | Position |
|---|---|
| US Billboard Hot 100 | 13 |
| US Hot R&B/Hip-Hop Songs (Billboard) | 11 |
| US Rap Songs (Billboard) | 2 |
| US Rhythmic (Billboard) | 5 |

=== Certifications ===
| Region | Certification | Certified units/sales |
|---|---|---|
| United States (RIAA) | Gold | 500,000^{*} |
^{*} Sales figures based on certification alone.

== Release history ==
| Region | Date | Format(s) | Label(s) | Ref. |
|---|---|---|---|---|
| United States | April 19, 2004 | Rhythmic contemporary radio | Cash Money; Universal | |
| United States | July 12, 2004 | Contemporary hit radio | Cash Money; Universal | |

== See also ==
- List of Hot 100 number-one singles of 2004 (U.S.)
- List of Billboard Rhythmic number-one songs of the 2000s
