= What Happened =

What Happened may refer to:

- What Happened (Clinton book), 2017 book by Hillary Clinton
- What Happened (McClellan book), 2008 autobiography by Scott McClellan
- "What Happened", a song by Sublime from the album 40oz. to Freedom
- "What Happened", an episode of One Day at a Time (2017 TV series)
- "Kya Howa" (lit. 'What Happened'), a song by Nazia Hassan from the 1983 album Young Tarang

== See also ==
- What's Happening (disambiguation)
