= Years Later =

Studio album by Soulja Slim
- Released: December 24, 2002
- Recorded: 2002
- Genre: Gangsta rap, hardcore hip-hop, Southern hip-hop
- Length: 66:00
- Label: Cut Throat Comitty Records
- Producer: Donald XL Robertson

Soulja Slim chronology
Streets Made Me (2001)	Years Later (2002)	Years Later...A Few Months After (2003)

Years Later is the third studio album by American rapper Soulja Slim. It was released on December 24, 2002. The album was Slim's first release on his own label, Cut Throat Comitty Records, after leaving No Limit in 2002.

== Track listing ==
Years Later
No.	Title	Length
1.	"Intro"	2:29
2.	"Years Later"	3:12
3.	"Feel Me Now"	4:19
4.	"Soulja This Soulja That"	3:02
5.	"Not My Dawg" (featuring B.G.)	4:16
6.	"I'll Pay for It"	3:36
7.	"Hit the Highway"	4:25
8.	"Souljas on My Feet"	5:02
9.	"Motha Fuck You" (featuring Tre-Nitty, Curren$y & Twelve A 'Klok)	4:12
10.	"I've Been Here Before"	3:50
11.	"I Wanna Fuck" (featuring Damien, Tre-Nitty & Twelve A 'Klok)	4:00
12.	"Bubble Gum Game"	4:06
13.	"Love Me or Love Me Not"	4:34
14.	"Best West Shit"	3:33
15.	"One Thing Bout a Player" (featuring Damien, Twelve A 'Klok & Tre-Nitty)	4:07
16.	"Rata Tata"	3:01
17.	"M.A.G.N.O.L.I.A."	4:28
18.	"To Damn Cut Throat" (featuring Tre-Nitty & Zo)	3:55
