= Years Later...A Few Months After =

Studio album by Soulja Slim
- Released: August 26, 2003
- Recorded: 2003
- Genre: Gangsta rap, hardcore hip-hop, Southern hip-hop
- Length: 70:00
- Label: Koch Records; Cut Throat Comitty Records
- Producer: Soulja Slim (exec.); Anthony Murray (also exec.); Bass Heavy, Dani Kartel, Sinasta, Zoher, KLC, S. Bear

Soulja Slim chronology
Years Later (2002)	Years Later...A Few Months After (2003)	Greatest Hitz (2005)

Years Later...A Few Months After is the fourth and final studio album by rapper Soulja Slim released exactly three months before his death. It was released on Koch Records.

== Critical reception ==
Professional ratings
Review scores
Source	Rating
The Source	3/5 stars

Soren Baker, in his review for the Chicago Tribune, called Years Later...A Few Months After an "impressive new collection", commending Soulja Slim's lyrics and "keen observations on street life", as well as the album's production. Dinero Jones of The Source highlighted "clacking snares and synthesizers" used throughout the album, which he compared to gunshots. He was dissatisfied with the lyrical content of the album, criticizing "clichéd lines of the 'Kill! Kill! Kill!' variety".

== Track listing ==
No.	Title	Length
1.	"Intro"	2:28
2.	"Hustler"	4:30
3.	"Cheeze Eataz"	4:10
4.	"Yeahh"	3:34
5.	"Heata On Me" (featuring Lil Real One & B.G.)	3:48
6.	"Speak Yo Mind"	0:09
7.	"I'll Pay For It"	3:36
8.	"U Hear Dat"	4:17
9.	"Souljas On My Feet"	5:01
10.	"Magnolia"	3:57
11.	"U Bootin' Up" (featuring Juvenile)	3:56
12.	"Love Me Or Love Me Not"	4:17
13.	"Holla At Me"	1:29
14.	"If It Ain't Real" (featuring Lil Real One)	3:57
15.	"F You Ni" (featuring Lil Menace, Twelve A 'Klok & Kayotic)	4:29
16.	"U Gonna Feel Me"	3:56
17.	"Hit The Highway"	4:23
18.	"Comitty" (featuring Twelve A 'Klok, Lil Real One, Kayotic, Cut Throat Hussain, Doublecrossa, Lil Menace, & Tre-Nitty)	4:15
19.	"I'll Pay For It" (featuring Mystikal)	3:36
