= The Streets Made Me =

Studio album by Soulja Slim
- Released: July 24, 2001
- Recorded: 2001
- Genre: Southern hip-hop
- Length: 1:13:46
- Label: No Limit South
- Producers: Bass Heavy; Carlos Stephens; Donald "XL" Robertson; Ezell Swang; Ke-Noe; Suga Bear

Soulja Slim chronology
Give It 2 'Em Raw (1998)	The Streets Made Me (2001)	Years Later (2002)

Professional ratings
Review scores
Source	Rating
AllMusic	4/5 stars
The Source	3.5/5 stars

The Streets Made Me is the second studio album by American rapper Soulja Slim. It was released on July 24, 2001, by No Limit South. Production was handled by Donald "XL" Robertson, Carlos Stephens, Bass Heavy, Ezell Swang, Ke-Noe and Suga Bear, with Master P serving as executive producer. It features guest appearances from Afficial, Black Felon, Damien, Krazy, Master P, Ms. Peaches, Silkk the Shocker, Slay Sean, Tre-Nitty and Twelve A' Klok.

The album peaked at number 188 on the Billboard 200, number 42 on the Top R&B/Hip-Hop Albums and number 9 on the Independent Albums charts in the United States.

== Track listing ==
No.	Title	Producer(s)	Length
1.	"Intro"	Carlos Stephens	1:26
2.	"Get Cha Mind Right" (featuring Black Felon)	XL	3:45
3.	"Make It Bounce"	Carlos Stephens	3:08
4.	"Soulja 4 Life"	Suga Bear	4:22
5.	"I'm a Fool"	Suga Bear	3:22
6.	"Gun Smoke"	Ezell Swang	3:02
7.	"Make It Happen" (featuring Krazy)	Ezell Swang	4:23
8.	"Slim Pimpin'"	Suga Bear	3:21
9.	"Bout Dis Shit"	Ezell Swang	3:44
10.	"Smoked Out"	Bass Heavy	3:44
11.	"Talk Now"	XL	3:37
12.	"Bossman" (featuring Ms. Peaches)	XL	3:04
13.	"Let It Go"	XL	3:09
14.	"Skit"	Bass Heavy	0:36
15.	"That's My Hoe"	Bass Heavy	3:30
16.	"Straight 2 the Dance Floor" (featuring Tre-Nitty, Damien and Twelve A' Klok)	XL	3:28
17.	"Ya Heard Me"	Ke'Noe	4:07
18.	"What You Came Fo"	XL	4:14
19.	"My Jacket"	Ke'Noe	5:05
20.	"Where They At"	Ke'Noe	3:48
21.	"Can't Touch Us" (featuring Afficial, Master P, Silkk the Shocker and Slay Sean)	Carlos Stephens	4:51
Total length:			1:13:46

== Charts ==
Chart (2001)	Peak position
US Billboard 200	188
US Top R&B/Hip-Hop Albums (Billboard)	42
US Independent Albums (Billboard)	9
