= The Compilation (UTP album) =

Compilation album by UTP
- Released: October 8, 2002
- Recorded: 2002
- Genres: Southern hip-hop, gangsta rap
- Label: Orpheus
- Producer: Juvenile

UTP chronology
The Compilation (2002)	The Beginning of the End (2004)

The Compilation is a compilation album by UTP, released on October 8, 2002, through Orpheus Records.

== Background ==
Juvenile had left popular hip-hop label Cash Money Records earlier in 2002 after three consecutive albums to form his own collective, UTP. In addition to Juvenile, UTP also featured Wacko, Skip, Corey Cee, Soulja Slim, and Young Buck, though Corey Cee would leave the group shortly after The Compilation. Most of the songs on the album were performed by the entire group, though some songs were performed by a lone member of the group. Production for the album was handled entirely by Juvenile himself.

== Reception ==
Professional ratings
Review scores
Source	Rating
AllMusic	2.5/5 stars

Gregory McIntosh of AllMusic gave the album 2.5 stars out of five. In his review he stated, "...For the most part, the beats are pretty ordinary, although the collective does pull out some clever hooks like on the anthem "Less Than a Playa," with its drowsy, lurching undercurrent of samples".

The album was not heavily promoted, but it became a local success and managed to make it to No. 60 on the Billboard Top R&B/Hip-Hop Albums.

== Track listing ==
No.	Title	Performed by:	Length
1.	"Intro"	Live Wire	3:05
2.	"You Ready"	UTP Playas	4:00
3.	"You Want It (We Got It)" (featuring Young Buck, Wacko, Godfather & Tara)	Soulja Slim	3:42
4.	"I Just Wanna Fuck You" (featuring Young Buck, Wacko & Skip)	Juvenile	3:38
5.	"Neck Gone"	UTP Playas	4:29
6.	"We Run This" (featuring Corey Cee & Wacko)	Skip	3:27
7.	"Died and Came Back"	Young Buck	4:13
8.	"Millionaire Soldiers" (featuring Wacko)	Skip	3:47
9.	"Ya'll in Trouble" (featuring Chilli, Tank, Young Buck, Brother Mohammed & Tara)	Lil Tee	4:54
10.	"Less Than A Playa"	UTP Playas	4:17
11.	"Streets Done Took Me Under"	UTP Playas	4:06
12.	"Don't Be Fucking Wit Me"	UTP Playas	3:10
13.	"Ride" (featuring Skip, Corey Cee & Dre)	Juvenile	3:38
14.	"Warn Em'"	UTP Playas	3:28
15.	"Hey Yo!"	Lower Level	3:32
16.	"I'm Dope"	Skip	3:40
17.	"Outro"	UTP Playas	3:01

== Charts ==
Chart (2002)	Peak position
Billboard Top R&B/Hip-Hop	60
