= Juve the Great =

Studio album by Juvenile
- Released: December 23, 2003
- Recorded: 2002–2003
- Genre: Gangsta rap; Southern hip hop
- Length: 61:50
- Label: Cash Money; Universal
- Producer: Mannie Fresh; Ad Future; Griz; Slice T; Sha Money XL; KLC; Dani Kartel

Juvenile chronology
Project English (2001)	Juve the Great (2003)	The Greatest Hits (2004)

Singles from Juve the Great
- 1. "In My Life" Released: 2003; 2. "Bounce Back" Released: November 20, 2003; 3. "Slow Motion" Released: March 1, 2004

Professional ratings
Review scores
Source	Rating
AllMusic	3/5 stars
The Boston Globe	(mixed)
Blender	3/5 stars
Entertainment Weekly	C−
PopMatters	(positive)
RapReviews	(8/10)
Rolling Stone	3/5 stars
USA Today	2.5/4 stars

Juve the Great is the sixth studio album by American rapper Juvenile. The album was released on December 23, 2003, by Cash Money Records and Universal Records. It was Juvenile's last album on the Cash Money label. The album was certified platinum July 20, 2004, becoming his third album to do so, after 400 Degreez and Tha G-Code.

Juve the Great includes the hit single "Slow Motion" featuring Soulja Slim, who was shot dead almost a month before the album's release, which topped the Billboard Hot 100. It became the most successful single for both artists and made Soulja Slim one of the only artists to top the charts posthumously.

== Track listing ==
Credits adapted from the album's liner notes.

No.	Title	Writer(s)	Producer(s)	Length
1.	"Intro"	Terius Gray; Adam Brumfield	AD Future	1:21
2.	"In My Life" (featuring Mannie Fresh)	Gray; Byron Thomas	Mannie Fresh	5:44
3.	"Enemy Turf"	Gray; Derek Edwards	Griz	4:04
4.	"Outside (skit)"			1:22
5.	"Bounce Back" (featuring Baby)	Gray; Thomas; Larry Blackmon	Mannie Fresh	4:13
6.	"Down South Posted" (featuring Skip and Wacko)	Gray; Sheldon Arrington; Clifford Nicholas; Damon Grison	Slice T	4:35
7.	"It Ain't Mines" (featuring Kango Slim of Partners-N-Crime)	Gray; Thomas	Mannie Fresh	4:21
8.	"Numb Numb"	Gray; Edwards	Griz	5:06
9.	"Lil' Daddy" (featuring Baby)	Gray; Thomas	Mannie Fresh	4:10
10.	"Fuckin' with Me" (featuring Skip and Wacko)	Gray; Arrington; Nicholas; Grison	Slice T	4:00
11.	"Cock It"	Gray; Thomas	Mannie Fresh	3:52
12.	"Club (skit)"			1:40
13.	"Juve the Great"	Gray; Michael Clervoix; Rashad Smith	Sha Money XL; Black Jeruz	3:28
14.	"Head in Advance"	Gray; Arrington	Slice T	4:01
15.	"For Everybody" (featuring Skip and Wacko)	Gray; Craig Lawson; Nicholas; Grison	KLC	4:38
16.	"At the Door (skit)"			1:07
17.	"Slow Motion" (featuring Soulja Slim)	Gray; James Tapp; Daniel Castillo	Dani Kartel	4:08

Sample credits

- "Bounce Back" contains elements of "Why Have I Lost You", written by Larry Blackmon, as performed by Cameo.

== Charts ==
=== Weekly charts ===
Chart (2004)	Peak position
US Billboard 200	28
US Top R&B/Hip-Hop Albums (Billboard)	4

=== Year-end charts ===
Chart (2004)	Position
US Billboard 200	60
US Top R&B/Hip-Hop Albums (Billboard)	9

== Certifications ==
Region	Certification	Certified units/sales
United States (RIAA)	Platinum	1,000,000^{^}
^{^} Shipments figures based on certification alone.
