= Rejuvenation (Juvenile album) =

Studio album by Juvenile
- Released: June 19, 2012
- Recorded: 2011
- Studio: The TakeOver Studios (Houston, TX)
- Genre: Southern hip-hop
- Length: 50:45
- Label: UTP; Young Empire; Fontana
- Producer: Bass Heavy; C. Smith; Drumma Boy; Mannie Fresh; S-8ighty; Sinista; Stevie Drumma

Juvenile chronology
Beast Mode (2010)	Rejuvenation (2012)	The Fundamentals (2014)

Singles from Rejuvenation
- 1. "Power" Released: December 6, 2011

Professional ratings
Review scores
Source	Rating
RapReviews	7.5/10
Slant	2/5 stars

Rejuvenation is the tenth solo studio album by American rapper Juvenile. It was released on June 19, 2012, through UTP Records and Young Empire Music Group with distribution via Fontana Distribution. Recording sessions took place at The TakeOver Studios in Houston. Production was handled by Mannie Fresh, S-8ighty, Sinista, Stevie Drumma, Charles Smith, Drumma Boy and Bass Heavy, with additional producer Joshua Moore. It features guest appearances from fellow U.T.P. members Skip and Wacko, Rick Ross, Trae tha Truth, Young Juve and Z-Ro.

The album peaked at number 39 on the Top R&B/Hip-Hop Albums chart in the United States. It was supported with a lone single "Power", released on December 6, 2011.

== Track listing ==
No.	Title	Producer(s)	Length
1.	"Rejuvenation"	Mannie Fresh	2:01
2.	"Power" (featuring Rick Ross)	Mannie Fresh	4:00
3.	"Can't Stop My Money"	C. Smith	2:43
4.	"Mardi Gras"	Sinista	3:50
5.	"Lost My Mind"	Stevie Drumma	3:58
6.	"Imma Get Rich"	Drumma Boy	2:50
7.	"Fall Back" (featuring Z-Ro and Trae)	Mannie Fresh	4:58
8.	"Bad Guy"	Mannie Fresh	3:31
9.	"Ahh Haa"	Sinista	4:13
10.	"I'm Yo People" (featuring Young Juve and Skip)	Bass Heavy	3:03
11.	"Got It Like That" (featuring Skip and Wacko)	Stevie Drumma	3:52
12.	"Still Here" (featuring Skip and Wacko)	S-8ighty	3:57
13.	"Ain't What You Want"	S-8ighty; Joshua Moore (add.)	4:02
14.	"Toast to the Good Life"	Mannie Fresh	3:47
Total length:			50:45

== Personnel ==
- Terius "Juvenile" Gray — vocals, executive producer
- William "Rick Ross" Roberts II — vocals (track 2)
- Joseph "Z-Ro" McVey — vocals (track 7)
- Frazier "Trae tha Truth" Thompson III — vocals (track 7)
- Demetrius "Young Juve" Gray — vocals (track 10)
- Clifford "Skip" Nicholas — vocals (tracks: 10–12)
- Damon "Wacko" Grison — vocals (tracks: 11, 12)
- Byron "Mannie Fresh" Thomas — producer (tracks: 1, 2, 7, 8, 14)
- Charles Smith — producer (track 3)
- Terrence "Sinista" Freeman — producer (tracks: 4, 9)
- Steven "Stevie Drumma" Twillie — producer (tracks: 5, 11)
- Christopher "Drumma Boy" Gholson — producer (track 6)
- Roderick "Bass Heavy" Tillman — producer (track 10)
- Dave "S-8ighty" Welcome — producer (tracks: 12, 13)
- Joshua Moore — additional producer (track 13), mixing, mastering
- James "J. Prince" Smith — executive producer
- Tony "Big Chief" Randle — A&R
- Anzel Jennings — A&R
- Jeremy "Jay" Ellis — A&R

== Charts ==
Chart (2012)	Peak position
US Top R&B/Hip-Hop Albums (Billboard)	39
