= U Understand =

Single by Juvenile

from the album Tha G-Code
- Released: November 25, 1999
- Recorded: 1999
- Genre: Hip hop
- Length: 4:19
- Label: Cash Money; Universal
- Songwriters: Juvenile; Mannie Fresh
- Producer: Mannie Fresh

Juvenile singles chronology
"Follow Me Now" (1999)	"U Understand" (1999)	"I Got That Fire" (2000)

U Understand is a song by American rapper Juvenile from his album Tha G-Code. It was produced by Mannie Fresh. The song peaked at number 83 on the Billboard Hot 100 and number 27 on the Billboard Hot R&B/Hip-Hop Singles & Tracks chart.

== Track listing ==
1. "U Understand (Radio)"
2. "U Understand (Extra Clean)"
3. "U Understand (Instrumental)"
4. "U Understand (Dirty)"

== Charts ==
Chart (2000)	Peak position
U.S. Billboard Hot 100	83
U.S. Billboard Hot R&B/Hip-Hop Singles & Tracks	27
