= Cocky & Confident =

Studio album by Juvenile
- Released: December 1, 2009
- Recorded: 2007–2009
- Genre: Hip-hop
- Length: 72:26
- Labels: UTP; E1; Atlantic; WMGreen
- Producers: Juvenile (exec.); Get Cool; Precise; Niyo; C. Smith; S-8ighty; Mouse; Raw Smoov; Tic Toc; FATBOI; Lu Balz

Juvenile chronology
| Reality Check (2006) | Cocky & Confident (2009) | Beast Mode (2010) |

Singles from Cocky & Confident
- 1. "Hands On You" Released: September 8, 2009; 2. "Gotta Get It" Released: September 15, 2009; 3. "We Be Getting Money" Released: October 27, 2009

Professional ratings
Aggregate scores
| Source | Rating |
|---|---|
| Metacritic | (49/100) |
Review scores
| Source | Rating |
| AllMusic | 3.5/5 stars |
| HipHopDX | 3.5/5 stars |
| The New York Times | (unfavorable) |
| Now | 4/5 stars |
| PopMatters | 3/10 stars |
| The Smoking Section | (unfavorable) |
| USA Today | 2/4 stars |

Cocky & Confident is the eighth studio album by American rapper Juvenile. The album was released on December 1, 2009, by Atlantic Records, UTP Records and E1 Entertainment. The album is the rapper's follow up to his album Reality Check, which landed at #1 on Billboard's Top 200 chart when the album was released in March 2006. It features artists such as B.G., Dorrough, Kango Slim, Q Corvette, Rico Love and Pleasure P and others making guest appearances. Producers on the album include Mouse, Precise, FATBOI, Lu Balz, S-8ighty & more. It is the first album in which Juvenile himself produces. The album debuted at #49 on the Billboard 200 with 23,000 copies sold in its first week.

== Singles ==
The first promo single is "Hands On You", featuring Pleasure P and produced by Lu Balz. It was released on iTunes on September 8, 2009. The first single is "Gotta Get It", which is produced by Precise. It was released on iTunes a week after "Hands On You" on September 15, 2009. The second single is "We Be Getting Money", featuring Shawty Lo, Dorrough, & Kango Slim and produced by S-8ighty. It was released on iTunes on October 27, 2009.

== Track listing ==
| No. | Title | Writer(s) | Producer(s) | Length |
|---|---|---|---|---|
| 1. | "Cocky & Confident" | Terius Gray; Willie Poole | Get Cool | 2:50 |
| 2. | "Gotta Get It" | Gray; Leroy Edwards | Precise | 4:05 |
| 3. | "Back Back" | Gray; Na'im Shakir; Charles Smith | Niyo; C. Smith (co.) | 4:01 |
| 4. | "We Be Getting Money" (featuring Shawty Lo, Dorrough, and Kango Slim) | Gray; Dave Welcome; Q. Jordan; Dorwin Dorrough; Walter Williams | S-8ighty | 4:48 |
| 5. | "My Money Don't Fold" (featuring Kango Slim and T Money) | Gray; Shakir; Williams; T. Patterson | Niyo | 4:36 |
| 6. | "Feeling Right" (featuring B.G., Cape, and Kango Slim) | Gray; Shakir; Williams; Christopher Dorsey; WD O'Connor | Niyo | 3:52 |
| 7. | "Top of the Line" | Gray; Jeremy Allen | Mouse | 4:11 |
| 8. | "Make U Feel Alright" (featuring Kango Slim and Jay da Menace) | Gray; Smith; Williams; Ronald Jones | C. Smith | 4:02 |
| 9. | "It's All Hood" | Gray; Smith | C. Smith | 3:41 |
| 10. | "New Orleans Stunna" (featuring Rawsmoov) | Gray; Jacob Tupolo | Rawsmoov | 3:23 |
| 11. | "All Over You" (featuring Kango Slim) | Gray; Welcome; Williams | S-8ighty | 3:02 |
| 12. | "You Can't Stop Me" (featuring Partners-N-Crime and Youngin') | Gray; Shakir; Michael Patterson; Desmone Jerome; Williams | Niyo | 3:43 |
| 13. | "Break It Down" (featuring Q Corvette) | Gray; Smith; Quinten Spears | C. Smith; Juvenile | 3:36 |
| 14. | "I'm Out Chere" (featuring Rico Love) | Gray; Dominic Brazile; Richard Butler | Tic Toc | 3:55 |
| 15. | "I'm Shining" | Gray; Allen | Mouse | 3:38 |
| 16. | "I Say" (featuring Youngin') | Gray; Edwards; Jerome | Precise | 3:44 |
| 17. | "Everything" (featuring Bobby Valentino) | Gray; LaDamon Douglas; Faheem Najm | FATBOI | 4:07 |
| 18. | "Hands On You" (featuring Pleasure P) | Gray; Louis Bell; Marcus Cooper; Williams | Lu Balz; Mike Caputo | 3:33 |
| 19. | "Listen" (featuring Q Corvette) | Gray; Per Håkan Gessle; Mats Persson | Juvenile | 3:49 |

Sample credits

- "Listen" contains a portion of "Listen to Your Heart", written by Per Håkan Gessle and Mats Persson.

== Personnel ==
- Terius "Juvenile" Gray – engineer, executive producer
- Aubrey "Pied Piper" Francis – co-executive producer
- Morton "Tim" Fry – co-executive producer
- Corey "CEO" Gray – executive producer
- Lu Balz – engineer (17)
- Jay da Menace – engineer (5, 8, 11)
- Graham Marsh – engineer (17)
- Arnold Mischkulnig – mixing (18)
- Mouse – engineer (7, 15)
- Brandon Park – assistant engineer (17)
- Precise – engineer (2–6, 8–14, 16, 18, 19), mixing (1–16, 19), additional mixing (17)
- S-8ighty – keyboards (2, 19)
- Glenn Schick – mastering
- Ray Seay – mixing (17)
- C. Smith – engineer (8, 9, 11–13, 19)
- Tic Toc – engineer (14)

== Charts ==
| Chart (2009) | Peak position |
|---|---|
| US Billboard 200 | 49 |
| US Top R&B/Hip-Hop Albums (Billboard) | 7 |
