= In My Life (Juvenile song) =

2003 single by Juvenile featuring Mannie Fresh

Single by Juvenile featuring Mannie Fresh

from the album Juve the Great
- Released: 2003
- Genre: Gangsta rap; Southern hip hop
- Length: 5:44
- Label: Cash Money; UTP; Universal
- Songwriter(s): Terius Gray; Byron Thomas
- Producer(s): Mannie Fresh

Juvenile singles chronology
"What You Doin' Wit Dat" (2002)	"In My Life" (2003)	"Bounce Back" (2003)

Mannie Fresh singles chronology
"Get Something" (2003)	"In My Life" (2003)	"Real Big" (2004)

Music video
- "In My Life" on YouTube

"In My Life" is a song by American rapper Juvenile and the lead single from his sixth studio album Juve the Great (2003). It features American rapper Mannie Fresh, who also produced the song.

== Composition ==
The song is about Juvenile's lifestyle of hedonism. Mannie Fresh performs the chorus.

== Critical reception ==
Writing for USA Today, Steve Jones commented that Mannie Fresh's "hard-grooving beats pulse under songs such as the autobiographical 'In My Life'". Matt Cibula of PopMatters regarded the song as the "centerpiece" of Juve the Great, adding that "The ostensible subject of it all is how Juve and Mannie want to live big-baller lives and just don't care about anything anyone says, but the real subject is how Mannie's tones are turned to drones by Watts' meddling."

== Charts ==
Chart (2003–2004)	Peak position
US Billboard Hot 100	46
US Hot R&B/Hip-Hop Songs (Billboard)	18
US Hot Rap Songs (Billboard)	13
US Rhythmic (Billboard)	40
