= Beast Mode (album) =

Studio album by Juvenile
- Released: July 6, 2010
- Recorded: 2009–2010
- Genre: Hip-hop
- Length: 38:28
- Labels: UTP; E1
- Producers: Juvenile (executive producer); Aubrey "Pied Piper" Francis (executive producer); S-8ighty; C. Smith; Sinista; Streets; Raw Smoov; Niyo

Juvenile chronology
Cocky & Confident (2009)	Beast Mode (2010)	Rejuvenation (2012)

Singles from Beast Mode
- 1. "Drop That Azz" Released: May 18, 2010

Professional ratings
Review scores
Source	Rating
AllMusic	3.5/5 stars
Billboard	(60/100)
HipHopDX	2/5 stars
RapReviews	(7.5/10)

Beast Mode is the ninth studio album by American rapper Juvenile. The album was released on July 6, 2010, by UTP Records and E1 Entertainment. Producers on the album include S-8ighty, C. Smith, Sinista, Streets, Raj Smoov, and Niyo.

== Background ==
The album is the rapper's follow up to his album Cocky & Confident, which was released in 2009. Juvenile said that he did not expect to include many featured guests on the album, but he does plan to recruit artists for the remix versions of his singles.

== Singles ==
The first single is "Drop That Azz", which was produced by C. Smith. It was released on iTunes on May 18, 2010. A music video for the single was released on June 11, 2010.

== Track listing ==
No.	Title	Writer(s)	Producer(s)	Length
1.	"Go Hard or Go Home"	Terius Gray; Dave Welcome	S-8ighty	2:36
2.	"Drop That Azz"	T. Gray; Charles Smith	C. Smith	3:42
3.	"Bitch Instructions"	T. Gray; Welcome	S-8ighty	3:17
4.	"La La La La La"	T. Gray; Welcome	S-8ighty	3:20
5.	"I'm da Man"	T. Gray; Welcome	S-8ighty	3:30
6.	"Nothing Like Me" (featuring Verse Simmonds and Juvy Jr.)	T. Gray; Demetrius Gray; Smith	C. Smith	4:35
7.	"No Team"	T. Gray; Terrence Freeman	Sinista	3:24
8.	"Drinks on Me" (featuring Cape)	T. Gray; Tylan Rogers	Streets; C. Smith (add.)	4:04
9.	"Pussy Kat"	T. Gray; Jacob Tupolo	Rawsmoov	3:13
10.	"Where They Do that At"	T. Gray; Leroy Edwards	Precise	3:35
11.	"Lights, Camera, Action"	T. Gray; Welcome	S-8ighty	3:12

== Charts ==
Chart (2010)	Peak position
US Billboard 200	58
US Top R&B/Hip-Hop Albums (Billboard)	13
