= Rodeo (Juvenile song) =

2006 single by Juvenile

Single by Juvenile

from the album Reality Check
- Released: February 27, 2006
- Recorded: 2005
- Genre: Hip hop
- Length: 3:58
- Label: Atlantic
- Songwriters: Terius Gray; Andre Lyon; Marcello Valenzano; Robert Kelly
- Producer: Cool & Dre

Juvenile singles chronology
"Boom" (2004)	"Rodeo" (2006)	"What's Happenin'" (2006)

Music video
- "Rodeo" on YouTube

"Rodeo" is a single by American rapper Juvenile taken from his seventh solo studio album Reality Check. It was released in 2006 via Atlantic Records. Produced by Cool & Dre, the song samples the remix of R. Kelly's "Bump n' Grind".

It peaked at number 41 on the Billboard Hot 100 in the United States. It would be Juvenile's last entry on the Hot 100 until "B.B.B." 20 years later.

The song was later sampled by Kodak Black ("Rodeo"), Kent Jones ("Don't Mind"), and Megan Thee Stallion ("Work That").

== Personnel ==
- Terius "Juvenile" Gray – rap vocals, songwriter
- Marcello "Cool" Valenzano – producer, songwriter
- Andre "Dre" Lyon – producer, songwriter
- Robert Kelly – songwriter
- Manny Marroquin – mixing

== Charts ==
=== Weekly charts ===
Weekly chart performance for "Rodeo"
Chart (2006)	Peak position
US Billboard Hot 100	41
US Hot R&B/Hip-Hop Songs (Billboard)	12
US Hot Rap Songs (Billboard)	7
US Rhythmic Airplay (Billboard)	19

=== Year-end charts ===
Year-end chart performance for "Rodeo"
Chart (2006)	Position
US Hot R&B/Hip-Hop Songs (Billboard)	54

== Certifications ==
Region	Certification	Certified units/sales
United States (RIAA)	Gold	500,000^{^}
^{^} Shipments figures based on certification alone.
