= I Got That Fire =

Single by Juvenile

from the album Tha G-Code
- Released: January 29, 2000
- Recorded: 1999
- Genre: Bounce
- Length: 3:54 (radio)
- Label: Cash Money; Universal
- Songwriter(s): Juvenile, Mannie Fresh
- Producer(s): Mannie Fresh

Juvenile singles chronology
"U Understand" (1999)	"I Got That Fire" (2000)	"Set It Off" (2001)

"I Got That Fire" is song by American hip hop artist Juvenile. It was released in January 2000 as the second single from his 1999 album Tha G-Code. It contains a sample of "Go Go Power Rangers".

== Track listing ==
1. "I Got That Fire (Radio Edit)"
2. "I Got That Fire (Extra Clean Radio Edit)"
3. "I Got That Fire (Instrumental)"
4. "I Got That Fire (LP Version)"
5. "I Got That Fire (Call Out Hook)"

== Charts ==
Chart (2000)	Peak position
U.S. Billboard Hot R&B/Hip-Hop Singles & Tracks	62
