= The Fundamentals (album) =

Studio album by Juvenile
- Released: February 18, 2014
- Recorded: 2013
- Genre: Hip-hop
- Length: 34:12
- Labels: UTP; Rap-A-Lot 4 Life; RED
- Producers: J. Prince (exec.), Juvenile (exec.), Sinista, S-80, Mike Maven, Dave Hampton, M-Mills, Chucky Thompson, Mouse

Juvenile chronology
Rejuvenation (2012)	The Fundamentals (2014)	Just Another Gangsta (2019)

The Fundamentals is the eleventh studio album by American rapper Juvenile. The album was released on February 18, 2014, by UTP Records, Rap-A-Lot Records, and RED Distribution.

== Critical response ==
Professional ratings
Review scores
Source	Rating
AllMusic	3/5 stars
HipHopDX	2/5 stars
XXL	(M)

The Fundamentals was met with mixed reviews from music critics. Steven Goldstein of HipHopDX gave the album two out of five stars, saying "Even with the new attention it’s receiving, The Fundamentals is forgettable at best." Max Goldberg of XXL gave the album an M, saying "Ultimately, the album’s title feels ironic. The Fundamentals struggles because Juvenile failed to tap into the skills that made him so exciting back in the day." David Jeffries of AllMusic gave the album three out of four stars, saying "With enough hooks to fill a bait shop, Juvenile's 11th studio effort does cross the finish line with the required amount of highlights to recommend to fans."

== Track listing ==
No.	Title	Producer(s)	Length
1.	"Pay Tha Rent" (featuring Young Jeezy and Yo Gotti)	Sinista	4:13
2.	"Close Around"	Mike Maven	3:08
3.	"Cradle 2 da Grave"	Mike Maven, M-Mills	3:45
4.	"Kill Kill" (featuring The Flame Game)	Mike Maven	2:56
5.	"Let Em Know"	S-80	4:00
6.	"All Over"	C. Smith	3:13
7.	"Live Wire"	Mouse	3:46
8.	"Super High"	Dave Hampton	3:30
9.	"Tales from the Hood"	Chucky Thompson	2:20
10.	"This Is Your Song"	S-80	3:20
Total length:			34:12

== Charts ==
Chart (2014)	Peak position
US Top R&B/Hip-Hop Albums (Billboard)	47
