= B.B.B. (song) =

2026 single by Juvenile featuring Genesisthegawd

Single by Juvenile featuring Genesisthegawd

from the album Boiling Point
- Released: January 23, 2026
- Genre: Southern hip-hop
- Length: 2:20
- Label: UTP; DNA; Hitmaker Distro
- Songwriters: Terius Gray; Megan Pete; Daniel Lebrun; Myeong Geun; Vladimir Vasilev
- Producers: Drok; Skolo; Blazerfxme

Juvenile featuring Genesisthegawd singles chronology
"One More Round" (2025)	"B.B.B." (2026)	"Shine" (2026)

Genesisthegawd singles chronology
"Did It" (2024)	"B.B.B." (2026)

Remix cover
- Cover art of the official remix featuring Megan Thee Stallion.

Megan Thee Stallion singles chronology
"Lover Girl" (2025)	"B.B.B." (Remix) (2026)	"DNA (More Than a Game)" (2026)

Music video
- "B.B.B." on YouTube

"B.B.B." ("Big Booty Bitch") is a single by American rapper Juvenile featuring American rapper Genesisthegawd. It was released on January 23, 2026 and went viral on the video-sharing app TikTok, following which an official remix featuring American rapper Megan Thee Stallion was released on February 27, 2026. Both versions appear on Juvenile's twelfth studio album, Boiling Point (2026). The song peaked at #67 on the Billboard Hot 100, making it Juvenile's first entry onto the chart since "Rodeo" in 2006.

== Background ==
In an interview with the radio station WiLD 94.1, Juvenile stated that when he listened to the song's beat, he decided to create a song that was relatable to Millennials. As such, the song immediately became popular on social media and resonated with audiences. Many listeners compared Juvenile's flow on the song to that of Megan Thee Stallion and suggested her to appear on a remix of the song, which later came into fruition. Megan teased her verse on February 25, 2026, two days before the remix was released.

== Composition ==
The production contains chugging guitars, piano, and "howling industrial scratches". Megan Thee Stallion raps about her love life, indirectly referring to her partner at the time, Klay Thompson. She mentions that she needs "old money" and references the couple Claressa Shields and Papoose, as well as the song "Never Lose Me" by Flo Milli.

== Critical reception ==
Tallie Spencer of HotNewHipHop gave a positive review, remarking that the song "stays rooted in Juvenile’s signature bounce sound, while Megan adds her confident delivery and playful energy, giving the record a fresh spark without losing its original spirit." She added that it "feels made for parties and dance floors, leaning into the same bounce influences that shaped both artists' careers."

== Charts ==
Chart performance for "B.B.B."
Chart (2026)	Peak position
US Billboard Hot 100	67
US Hot R&B/Hip-Hop Songs (Billboard)	16
