= Nolia Clap =

2004 single by UTP (Juvenile, Skip & Wacko)

Single by UTP

from the album The Beginning of the End...
- Released: August 31, 2004
- Recorded: in Los Angeles, California
- Genre: Southern hip-hop
- Label: Rap-A-Lot 4 Life; UTP
- Songwriters: Terius Gray; Damon Grison; Clifford Nicholas; Donald Robertson
- Producer: Donald "XL" Robertson

Juvenile singles chronology
"Slow Motion" (2004)	"Nolia Clap" (2004)	"Boom" (2005)

Music video
- "Nolia Clap" on YouTube

"Nolia Clap" is a song by American Southern hip-hop trio UTP, released on August 31, 2004, through Rap-A-Lot 4 Life and UTP Records as a lead single from the group's debut studio album The Beginning of the End.... It was written by Terius "Juvenile" Gray, Damon "Wacko" Grison, Clifford "Skip" Nicholas, and producer Donald "XL" Robertson.

The song peaked at number 31 on the Billboard Hot 100 and at number 9 on both Hot R&B/Hip-Hop Songs and Hot Rap Songs charts in the United States.

Its remix version, produced by Sheldon "Slice Tee" Arrington, was also included in The Beginning of the End.... The re-remix version is featured on Nolia Clap (EP) with guest appearances from Z-Ro, Bun B, Earl Hayes, Slim Thug, T.I. and Hot Wright, produced by Donald "XL" Robertson and Juvenile.

== Music video ==
The music video was filmed in the Magnolia Projects in the 3rd Ward of Uptown New Orleans, Louisiana. It follows the split-video format that was popular in hip-hop during the 2000s. The first portion of the video features the first two verses of "Nolia Clap," while the second half transitions into the first verse and hook of "What's Up" by Juvenile and Kangol Slimm. Killa Stone, B.G., J. Prince, Partners-N-Crime, Fiend, Choppa, Nelly and Chopper Young City make cameo appearances.

== Charts ==
=== Weekly charts ===
Chart (2004)	Peak position
US Billboard Hot 100	31
US Hot R&B/Hip-Hop Songs (Billboard)	9
US Hot Rap Songs (Billboard)	9
US Radio Songs (Billboard)	30

=== Year-end charts ===
Chart (2004)	Position
US Hot R&B/Hip-Hop Songs (Billboard)	55
