= Gotta Get It =

Album by Juvenile

Studio album by Juvenile & J.T. the Bigga Figga
- Released: October 2, 2002
- Recorded: 2002
- Genres: Gangsta rap; hardcore hip hop; West Coast hip hop
- Labels: Get Low; UTP
- Producers: JT the Bigga Figga; Juvenile

Gotta Get It is a collaboration album by rappers Juvenile and JT the Bigga Figga. The album was released on October 2, 2002, by Get Low Recordz along with UTP Records, and was produced by both Juvenile and JT the Bigga Figga.

== Track listing ==
1. "Holla At Ya Thugz"(Juvenile & Ball Or Fall Family) - 2:48
2. "Got G'z On It" (Yukmouth, Killa Tay & Mac Mall) - 4:24
3. "I Know" (Ant Dog, Tac & London) - 5:09
4. "Reptillian" (Priceless {from K.C.}) - 4:44
5. "Gotta Get It" (Juvenile, JT the Bigga Figga, Billy Cook & Young Buck) - 3:39
6. "Gotta Love It" (Cozmo & PDS {of the Recruits}) - 4:12
7. "Open Arms" (London) - 4:49
8. "Cold World" (PDS {of the Recruits}) - 5:19
9. "Risky Business" (Killa Tay & Marvaless) - 4:24
10. "Ride Or Die" (Outlawz & Murder One) - 3:01
11. "C.E.O. Stacks" (Juvenile, Young Buck, Skip & JT the Bigga Figga) - 4:17
12. "Step To The Side" (Tha Gamblaz & Sean T.) - 3:44
13. "Dump Dump" (Tac & Killa Tay) - 3:59
14. "Thug Life" (Messy Marv) - 4:29
