= Set It Off (Juvenile song) =

Single by Juvenile

from the album Project English
- Released: July 21, 2001
- Recorded: 2000
- Genre: Hip hop
- Length: 4:17
- Label: Cash Money; Universal
- Songwriter(s): Juvenile, Mannie Fresh
- Producer(s): Mannie Fresh

Juvenile singles chronology
| "I Got That Fire" (2000) | "Set It Off" (2001) | "From Her Mama (Mama Got Ass)" (2001) |

Music video
- "Juvenile - Set It Off" on YouTube

"Set It Off" is a song by American hip hop artist Juvenile. It was released in July 2001 as the lead single from his 2001 album Project English. The instrumental's inspiration was "Drag 'Em 'N tha River" off of Uptown 4 Life by U.N.L.V. in 1996.

== Track listing ==
1. "Set It Off (Radio Edit)"
2. "Set It Off (LP Version)"
3. "Set It Off (Instrumental)"
4. "Set It Off (Acapella)"
5. "Set It Off (TV track)"

== Charts ==
=== Weekly charts ===
| Chart (2001) | Peak position |
|---|---|
| US Billboard Hot 100 | 65 |
| US Hot R&B/Hip-Hop Songs (Billboard) | 19 |
| US Hot Rap Songs (Billboard) | 18 |
| US Rhythmic (Billboard) | 24 |

=== Year-end charts ===
| Chart (2001) | Position |
|---|---|
| US Hot R&B/Hip-Hop Songs (Billboard) | 70 |
