= UTP (group) =

American hip-hop group

- Also known as: UTP Playas, Uptown Project
- Origin: New Orleans, Louisiana, U.S.
- Genres: Southern hip-hop; gangsta rap
- Years active: 2002–2007
- Labels: UTP; Rap-A-Lot
- Past members: Soulja Slim; Juvenile; Young Buck; Wacko; Skip; Corey Cee

UTP (short for Uptown Project) were an American hip-hop group composed of Southern rappers Juvenile, Soulja Slim, Young Buck, Wacko, Skip, and Corey Cee.

The group was formed by Juvenile after he left Cash Money Records in 2001 and originally consisted of Juvenile, Wacko, Skip, Corey Cee, Soulja Slim and Young Buck. The group's first release was The Compilation, which was released through Orpheus Records on October 8, 2002. The album featured performances by Young Buck, Soulja Slim, Juvenile, Wacko, Skip and Corey Cee both as a group or by themselves. A second compilation titled Street Stories was made in 2003. During the early stages of his career, 50 Cent worked with Young Buck, Skip, and Wacko on multiple songs for his mixtapes including 50 Cent Is the Future. Young Buck would subsequently leave UTP to join 50 Cent's G-Unit. Soulja Slim was murdered November 26, 2003 and Corey Cee later left the group.

The group then signed a joint deal with Rap-A-Lot and Asylum in 2003 and began work on their debut album. UTP's debut LP, The Beginning of the End was released on May 18, 2004. The album spawned the hit single "Nolia Clap", which peaked at 31 on the Billboard Hot 100 and was the group's only top 40 hit. The group followed the LP up with a seven-song EP also titled Nolia Clap that was released later in the year and it peaked at 65 on the R&B chart. Both Wacko and Skip would appear on Juvenile's 2006 album, Reality Check. Wacko and Skip returned as duo in 2007 without Juvenile and released UTP's second full-length LP Back Like We Left Something on July 24, 2007, and it peaked at 52 on the Billboard R&B chart.

Wacko died in August 2026, at the age of 52.

== Discography ==
Year	Title	Chart positions	
Year	Title	U.S.	U.S. R&B
2002	The Compilation: Released: October 8, 2002; Label: Orpheus	–	60
2004	The Beginning of the End: Released: May 18, 2004; Label: Rap-A-Lot / Asylum	122	17
2004	Nolia Clap: Released: November 23, 2004; Label: Rap-A-Lot / Asylum	–	65
2007	Back Like We Left Something: Released: July 24, 2007; Label: Rap-A-Lot / Asylum	–	52
