= What's Happenin' (Juvenile song) =

2006 single by Juvenile

Single by Juvenile

from the album Reality Check
- Released: 2006
- Genre: Hip hop
- Length: 3:37
- Label: UTP; Atlantic
- Songwriter(s): Terius Gray; Terrence Freeman
- Producer(s): Sinista

Juvenile singles chronology
"Rodeo" (2006)	"What's Happenin'" (2006)	"Way I Be Leanin'" (2006)

Music video
- "Get Ya Hustle On"/"What's Happenin'" on YouTube

"What's Happenin'" is a song by American rapper Juvenile and the second single from his seventh studio album Reality Check (2006). It was produced by Sinista.

== Composition ==
"What's Happenin'" is a party and street-themed song. It finds Juvenile performing in a flow similar to that of "Posse on Broadway" by Sir Mix-a-Lot.

== Critical reception ==
Steve "Flash" Juon of RapReviews wrote "Juvenile is ready to scrap, and even though he's consistantly [sic] underrated as a lyricist he constantly comes through on tracks like 'What's Happenin''. J. Freedom du Lac of Houston Chronicle called the song a "fantastic hard-core homage" to "Posse on Broadway".

== Music video ==
The music video was directed by Ben Mor and shot in Juvenile's hometown of New Orleans, in the Lower Ninth Ward. It was filmed as the second half of a video for both his song "Get Ya Hustle On" and "What's Happenin'".

== Charts ==
Chart (2006)	Peak position
US Hot R&B/Hip-Hop Songs (Billboard)	56
US Hot Rap Songs (Billboard)	25
