= Soulja Slim =

American rapper (1977–2003)

- Soulja Slim in 2002

Background information
- Also known as: Magnolia Slim; Soulja Slim
- Born: James Adarryl Tapp Jr. September 9, 1977; New Orleans, Louisiana, U.S.
- Died: November 26, 2003 (aged 26) New Orleans, Louisiana, U.S.
- Genres: Southern hip-hop; hardcore hip-hop; gangsta rap
- Occupations: Rapper; songwriter
- Years active: 1993–2003
- Labels: Cut Throat Committee; No Limit; Koch
- Formerly of: UTP

James Adarryl Tapp Jr. (September 9, 1977 – November 26, 2003), better known by his stage name Soulja Slim, was an American rapper from New Orleans, Louisiana. He is best known for his appearance on Juvenile's 2004 single "Slow Motion", which peaked atop the Billboard Hot 100. Eight years prior, he signed with Master P's No Limit Records to release his debut studio album, Give It 2 'Em Raw (1998), which peaked at number 13 on the Billboard 200. It was followed by three albums until the single's posthumous release, which was in memory of his unsolved murder.

== Early life ==
James Adarryl Tapp Jr. was born in New Orleans on September 9, 1977, to James and Linda Tapp. He was raised in the Magnolia Projects in New Orleans and attended Cohen Senior High School before dropping out of school in the 11th grade. He began selling drugs, as well as forming an addiction to heroin and cocaine. By 1993, he was performing as "Magnolia Slim" at venues and block parties. His first recordings, however, would be on Parkway Pumpin', an independent label run by record producer KLC and also featuring 39 Posse, Fiend, Mac, Mystikal Mike (later Mystikal), Mr. Serv-On, and Da Hound. Soulja Slim's solo debut, Soulja 'Fa' Lyfe, was released in 1994 by Parkway Pumpin' and Hype Enough Records and sold 90,000 units independently. In 1995, he released the four-song EP Dark Side on Hype Enough Records.

== Career ==
=== Hype Enough Records (1994–1995) ===
Soulja Slim originally performed under the name Magnolia Slim. On the label Hype Enough Records, Slim would release two albums. In 1994, the cassette Soulja 'Fa' Lyfe was released. The song "Kickin It For Them Hoes" became a radio hit heard on WQUE 93.3 FM, thanks to radio DJ Davey D and "It's Ya Boy" Wild Wayne, a.k.a. Mr. 9 O'Clock Props. The following year, Slim released the cassette Dark Side. Dark Side produced the track "You Got It" featuring Six Shot.

=== No Limit Records and "Slow Motion" (1995–2003) ===
In the same year, the song "You Got It" appeared on a No Limit Records double-CD compilation, Down South Hustlers: Bouncin' and Swingin' . This compilation went nationwide. This gave the world outside Louisiana its first glimpse of Slim. In 1998, Tapp, now calling himself Soulja Slim, released Give It 2 'Em Raw on No Limit, which featured singles "Street Life" and "From What I Was Told," the latter also produced as a music video. The album debuted at number 13 on the Billboard 200 and sold 82,000 in the first week. At that time, Soulja Slim was convicted of armed robbery and incarcerated. He reappeared three years later with The Streets Made Me, which was again released on the No Limit label. From there, he started his own label, Cut Throat Committee Records, and released Years Later in late 2002. In 2003, he released Years Later...A Few Months After, his last album before his death. The album featured the song "I'll Pay for It". In 2003, he also collaborated with fellow New Orleans rapper Juvenile to make the song "Slow Motion". The song was released on Juvenile's album Juve the Great and reached the number one spot on the Billboard Hot 100. It was Soulja Slim and Juvenile's first number one hit, and as the song was released after Soulja Slim's death, he became only the sixth artist to have a posthumous number one song.

== Death ==
Tapp died on November 26, 2003, after an assailant shot him four times, twice in the face and twice in the chest, on the front lawn of the home of his mother and stepfather, Phillip "Tuba Phil" Frazier of Rebirth Brass Band, in the Gentilly neighborhood. Tapp was buried with his Cut Throat Committee chain and the outfit he wore on the cover of Give It 2 'Em Raw. Tapp's burial place is Mount Olivet Cemetery in New Orleans.

On December 31, 2003, police arrested 22-year-old Garelle Smith in connection with Tapp's murder. Police discovered a stolen police pistol in Smith's possession with a scratched-off serial number. A ballistics test matched bullets from that gun to the ones that killed Tapp, but no witnesses would testify against him. By 2008, Smith had been arrested for three more murders, and, in each case, charges were dropped and he was released due to lack of witnesses and the New Orleans 60-day law. These murders, including that of Tapp, became cold cases. On August 13, 2011, Smith himself was found shot to death in the Gentilly neighborhood of New Orleans.

== Discography ==
=== Studio albums ===
List of albums, with selected chart positions
Title	Album details	Peak chart positions		
Title	Album details	US	US R&B	US Ind.
Soulja 'Fa' Lyfe	Released: 1994; Label: Hype Enough Records; Format: Cassette	—	—	—
Dark Side	Released: 1995; Label: Hype Enough Records; Format: Cassette	—	—	—
Give It 2 'Em Raw	Released: May 19, 1998; Label: No Limit, Priority; Format: CD, LP, cassette	13	4	—
The Streets Made Me	Released: July 24, 2001; Label: No Limit; Format: CD, cassette	188	42	9
Years Later	Released: December 24, 2002; Label: Cut Throat Committee; Format: CD, cassette	—	72	—
Years Later...A Few Months After	Released: August 26, 2003; Label: Cut Throat Committee, Koch; Format: CD, cassette	—	44	—

=== Mixtapes ===
List of mixtapes, with year released
Title	Mixtape details
Cutthroat Mixtape Vol. 1	Released: 2004; Label: Cut Throat Committee; Format: CD
Cutthroat Mixtape Vol. 2	Released: 2004; Label: Cut Throat Committee; Format: CD
Thug Brothers	Released: 2008; Label: Cut Throat Committee; Format: CD

=== Compilations ===
- 1999: Hype Enough Records: Limited Edition
- 2005: Greatest Hitz

=== Singles ===
==== As lead artist ====
List of singles, with chart position, showing year released and album name
Title	Year	Peak chart position on US R&B	Album
"From What I Was Told"	1998	—	Give It 2 'Em Raw
"Street Life" (featuring Master P, Silkk the Shocker & O'Dell)	1998	17	Give It 2 'Em Raw
"Get Cha Mind Right" (featuring Krazy & X-Conn)	2001	—	The Streets Made Me
"I'll Pay For It"	2003	—	Years Later...A Few Months After/Years Later
"Feel Me Now"	2003	—	Years Later...A Few Months After/Years Later
"Love Me Or Love Me Not"	2003	—	Years Later...A Few Months After/Years Later
"—" denotes a recording that did not chart.

==== As featured artist ====
List of singles, with selected chart positions, showing year released and album name
Title	Year	Peak chart positions			Album
Title	Year	US	US R&B	US Rap	Album
"Slow Motion" (Juvenile featuring Soulja Slim)	2004	1	2	1	Juve the Great
"—" denotes a recording that did not chart.

== See also ==
- List of murdered hip-hop musicians
- List of unsolved murders (2000–present)
