= Project English =

Studio album by Juvenile
- Released: August 21, 2001
- Recorded: 2000–2001
- Studios: Cash Money Studios (Metairie, Louisiana); Circle House Studios (Miami, Florida)
- Genre: Southern hip-hop
- Length: 70:53
- Labels: Cash Money; Universal
- Producer: Mannie Fresh

Juvenile chronology
Playaz of da Game (2000)	Project English (2001)	Juve the Great (2003)

Singles from Project English
- 1. "Set It Off" Released: July 21, 2001; 2. "Mamma Got Ass" Released: 2001

Professional ratings
Review scores
Source	Rating
AllMusic	3/5 stars
HipHopDX	3.5/5
Los Angeles Times	3/4 stars
RapReviews	8/10
Rolling Stone	2.5/5 stars
The New Rolling Stone Album Guide	3/5 stars
USA Today	2.5/4 stars

Project English is the fifth solo studio album by American rapper Juvenile. It was released on August 21, 2001, via Cash Money and Universal Records. Recording sessions took place at Cash Money Studios in Metairie and at Circle House Studios in Miami. Produced entirely by Mannie Fresh, it features guest appearances from the Big Tymers, the Hot Boys and TQ. The album peaked at number two on both the Billboard 200 and Top R&B/Hip-Hop Albums charts in the United States. On October 24, 2001, it was certified gold by the Recording Industry Association of America for shipping 500,000 copies.

The album was supported by two singles: "Set It Off" and "Mamma Got Ass", both of which coincidentally peaked at number 65 on the Billboard Hot 100.

== Track listing ==
No.	Title	Length
1.	"Intro - Let's Roll"	3:32
2.	"Set It Off"	4:17
3.	"H.B. HeadBusta"	4:16
4.	"4 Minutes" (featuring Hot Boys)	4:32
5.	"My Life" (featuring TQ)	4:38
6.	"Get Your Hustle On" (featuring Big Tymers)	4:39
7.	"Sunshine"	4:25
8.	"Be Gone" (featuring Big Tymers)	5:24
9.	"Mamma Got Ass"	4:29
10.	"They Lied" (featuring Big Tymers)	4:55
11.	"White Girl" (featuring Baby and Lil Wayne)	4:40
12.	"In Ya Ass"	4:57
13.	"Set It Off (Remix Radio)" (featuring Turk, Baby, and Lil Wayne)	4:14
14.	"In the Nolia"	4:25
15.	"What U Scared 4" (featuring Lil Wayne)	4:04
16.	"Outro - Let's Go"	3:26
Total length:		70:53

== Personnel ==
- Terius "Juvenile" Gray – vocals
- Byron "Mannie Fresh" Thomas – vocals, keyboards, producer, engineering, mixing
- Bryan "Baby"/"Birdman" Williams – vocals, executive producer
- Mikkel "Mikkey" Nance – vocals
- Tab "Turk" Virgil, Jr. – vocals
- Christopher "B.G." Dorsey – vocals
- Dwayne "Lil Wayne" Carter – vocals
- Terrence "TQ" Quaites – vocals
- Kedrick "Lac" Moore – vocals
- Rick Marcel – bass
- Terrence "Bearwolfe" Williams – keyboards assistant
- Ray Seay – engineering, mixing
- Chris Athens – mastering
- Ronald "Slim" Williams – executive producer
- Pen & Pixel Graphics – artwork

== Charts ==
=== Weekly charts ===
Chart (2001)	Peak position
US Billboard 200	2
US Top R&B/Hip-Hop Albums (Billboard)	2

=== Year-end charts ===
Chart (2001)	Position
US Billboard 200	129
US Top R&B/Hip-Hop Albums (Billboard)	52

== Certifications ==
Region	Certification	Certified units/sales
United States (RIAA)	Gold	500,000^{^}
^{^} Shipments figures based on certification alone.
