= Reality Check (Juvenile album) =

Studio album by Juvenile
- Released: March 7, 2006
- Recorded: 2005–2006
- Genre: Hip-hop
- Length: 71:54
- Labels: UTP; Atlantic
- Producers: Juvenile; Cool & Dre; XL; Scott Storch; Mannie Fresh; Lil Jon; Sinista; Stormy Dai; Perion; Brian McKnight; Mike Dean

Juvenile chronology
The Greatest Hits (2004)	Reality Check (2006)	Cocky & Confident (2009)

Singles from Reality Check
- 1. "Rodeo" Released: February 27, 2006

Professional ratings
Review scores
Source	Rating
AllMusic	3.5/5 stars
HipHopDX	3.5/5 stars
Okayplayer	4/5 stars
Pitchfork	7.9/10
RapReviews	8/10
Robert Christgau	B−
Rolling Stone	3.5/5 stars
Stylus Magazine	B
USA Today	3/4 stars
Vibe	3.5/5 stars

Reality Check is the seventh studio album by American rapper Juvenile. The album was released on March 7, 2006, by UTP Records and Atlantic Records. The album features guest appearances from Paul Wall, Mike Jones, Fat Joe and Ludacris, among others.

Reality Check was supported by the singles "Rodeo"/"Get Ya Hustle On", "What's Happenin'" and "Way I Be Leanin'". The album debuted at number one on the US Billboard 200 chart, selling 174,000 copies its first week. The album was certified gold by the Recording Industry Association of America (RIAA).

== Singles ==
The album's lead single "Rodeo"; it was produced by Cool & Dre was released. The single had charted on the US Billboard Hot 100 chart, peaking at number 41. Its B-side was "Get Ya Hustle On", produced by Donald XL Robertson. The song describes as a scathing indictment for the local government and the media's response to Hurricane Katrina, including lyrics such as "The mayor ain't your friend, he's the enemy––just to get your vote, a saint is what he pretend to be" and "Fuck Fox News I don't listen to y'all ass, couldn't get a nigga off the roof when the storm passed." A music video for the song and the album's second single was "What's Happenin'" was released.

The album's third single "Way I Be Leanin'" featuring Mike Jones, Paul Wall; along with his label-mates Wacko and Skip was released. The music video for "Way I Be Leanin'" premiered on MTV's Making the Video.

== Track listing ==
No.	Title	Writer(s)	Producer(s)	Length
1.	"Intro"		Stormy Dai	0:26
2.	"Get Ya Hustle On"	T. Gray; T. Freeman; D. Robertson	XL; Sinista	3:29
3.	"Around the Way"	T. Gray; T. Freeman	Sinista	3:55
4.	"Sets Go Up" (featuring Wacko)	T. Gray; S. Storch; D. Grison	Scott Storch	4:12
5.	"Rodeo"	T. Gray; A. Lyons; M. Valenzano; R. Kelly	Cool & Dre	3:58
6.	"What's Happenin'"	T. Gray; T. Freeman	Sinista	3:37
7.	"Loose Booty" (featuring 8 Ball and Skip)	T. Gray; D. Miller; P. Smith; C. Nicholas	Stormy Dai	4:12
8.	"Way I Be Leanin'" (featuring Mike Jones, Paul Wall, Wacko, and Skip)	T. Gray; J. Hunter; M. Jones; P. Slayton; C. Nicholas; D. Grison; T. Mosely; S. Carter	Perion	4:08
9.	"Break a Brick Down"	T. Gray; A. Lyons; M. Valenzano	Cool & Dre	4:41
10.	"Who's Ya Daddy"	T. Gray; T. Freeman	Sinista	3:18
11.	"I Know You Know" (featuring Trey Songz)	T. Gray; N. Perez; T. Neverson; M. Caren	Happy Perez	4:06
12.	"Keep Talkin'" (featuring Skip and Redd Eyezz)	T. Gray; T. Freeman; C. Nicholas; P. James	Sinista	3:52
13.	"Rock Like That" (featuring Bun B)	T. Gray; T. Freeman; B. Freeman	Sinista	3:32
14.	"Why Not" (featuring Skip)	T. Gray; J. Smith; C. Love; L. Jefferson; J. Phillips; R. Jones	Lil Jon	3:53
15.	"Animal"	B. Thomas	Mannie Fresh	3:42
16.	"Addicted" (featuring Brian McKnight)	T. Gray; B. McKnight	Brian McKnight	3:45
17.	"Holla Back"	T. Gray; T. Freeman	Sinista	4:03
18.	"Pop U" (featuring Ludacris and Fat Joe)	T. Gray; J. Cartagena; C. Bridges; M. Dean	Mike Dean; Juvenile	4:25
19.	"Say It to Me Now" (featuring Kango of Partners-N-Crime)	T. Gray; S. Storch	Scott Storch	4:45

iTunes bonus tracks
No.	Title	Length
20.	"Come Out the Laundry" (featuring Skip)	3:21

== Charts ==
=== Weekly charts ===
Chart (2006)	Peak position
US Billboard 200	1
US Top R&B/Hip-Hop Albums (Billboard)	1

=== Year-end charts ===
Chart (2006)	Position
US Billboard 200	143
US Top R&B/Hip-Hop Albums (Billboard)	31

== Certifications ==
Region	Certification	Certified units/sales
United States (RIAA)	Gold	500,000^{^}
^{^} Shipments figures based on certification alone.
