= The Beginning of the End (UTP album) =

The Beginning of the End...

Studio album by Juvenile • Wacko • Skip
- Released: May 18, 2004
- Recorded: 2003–04
- Studios: Stone House (Los Angeles, CA); Studio Center (Miami, FL); UTP Studios (New Orleans, LA)
- Genres: Southern hip-hop; gangsta rap
- Length: 58:11
- Labels: UTP; Rap-A-Lot 4 Life
- Producers: J. Prince (exec.); Juvenile (also exec.); Ad Future; Derek "Grizz" Edwards; Donald "XL" Robertson; Slice Tee

Juvenile • Wacko • Skip chronology
| The Compilation (2002) | The Beginning of the End... (2004) | Nolia Clap (2004) |

Singles from The Beginning of the End...
- 1. "Nolia Clap" Released: August 31, 2004; 2. "What's Up" Released: 2004

Professional ratings
Review scores
| Source | Rating |
|---|---|
| AllMusic | 2.5/5 stars |

The Beginning of the End... is the debut studio album by American hip-hop group UTP. It was released on May 18, 2004, through Rap-A-Lot Records. Recording sessions took place at Stone House in Los Angeles, at Studio Center in Miami, and at UTP Studios in New Orleans. Production was handled by Derek "Grizz" Edwards, Slice Tee, Donald "XL" Robertson, Ad Future, and Juvenile. It features guest appearances from Partners-N-Crime, Ms. Tee and Big Zuse.

The album peaked at number 122 on the Billboard 200 and number 17 on the Top R&B/Hip-Hop Albums chart in the United States. The album produced two singles: "Nolia Clap" and "What's Up". Its lead single, "Nolia Clap", made it to number 31 on the Billboard Hot 100 and number 9 on both Hot R&B/Hip-Hop Songs and Hot Rap Songs. The album's chopped and screwed version was edited by OG Ron C.

== Background ==
The Beginning of the End... marked UTP's first studio album after having previously releasing two compilation albums in 2002 (The Compilation) and 2003 (Street Stories). Instead of using the UTP name, the trio was instead billed as Juvenile, Wacko & Skip in order to build off Juvenile's popularity.

== Track listing ==
| No. | Title | Writer(s) | Length |
|---|---|---|---|
| 1. | "Nolia Clap" | Damon Grison; Donald Robertson | 4:30 |
| 2. | "Don't Start" | Terius Gray; Grison; Clifford Nicholas; Sheldon Arrington | 3:47 |
| 3. | "What's Up" (featuring Kango Slim) | Gray; Grison; Nicholas; Walter Williams; Arrington | 3:52 |
| 4. | "Who the Fuck Is This" | Gray; Grison; Nicholas; Arrington | 4:00 |
| 5. | "Juvie, Wacko, Skip (3 Bad Brothers)" | Gray; Grison; Nicholas; Arrington | 3:28 |
| 6. | "Solja" | Gray; Grison; Nicholas; Arrington | 4:19 |
| 7. | "What's Your Brains Like" (featuring Kango Slim) | Gray; Grison; Nicholas; Arrington | 5:21 |
| 8. | "War Shit" | Gray; Grison; Nicholas; Arrington | 4:22 |
| 9. | "That's All That I Know" | Gray; Derek Edwards | 4:09 |
| 10. | "At U Bitches" | Gray; Grison; Nicholas; Robertson | 3:00 |
| 11. | "The Best Years" (featuring Kango Slim) | Gray; Grison; Nicholas; Arrington | 4:20 |
| 12. | "Nolia Clap (Remix)" | Gray; Grison; Nicholas; Arrington | 4:30 |
| 13. | "What's Up (Remix)" (featuring Ms. Tee, Big Zuse and Kango Slim) | Gray; Grison; Nicholas; Trishell Williams; C. Winn; W. Williams; Arrington | 3:45 |
| 14. | "Ride Tonight" (featuring Partners-N-Crime and Ms. Tee) | Grison; Nicholas; Michael Patterson; W. Williams; T. Williams; Adam Brumfield | 4:48 |
| Total length: | | | 58:11 |

== Personnel ==
- Terius "Juvenile" Gray – main artist, producer, mixing, executive producer, A&R
- Damon "Wacko" Grison – main artist
- Clifford "Skip" Nicholas – main artist
- Walter "Kango" Williams – featured artist (tracks: 3, 7, 11, 13, 14)
- Trishell "Ms. Tee" Williams – featured artist (tracks: 13, 14)
- C. "Zuse" Winn – featured artist (track 13)
- Michael "Meanor" Patterson – featured artist (track 14)
- Adam "AD Future" Brumfield – producer
- Derek "Grizz" Edwards – producer
- Donald "XL" Robertson – producer
- Sheldon "Slice Tee" Arrington – producer
- James Prince – executive producer
- John "JP" Pegram – engineering
- Mac "Silencer" Jones – engineering
- Dave Junco – engineering, mixing
- Mike Dean – mixing, mastering
- Anzel "Red Boy" Jennings – A&R
- Aubrey Francis – project coordinator
- Paul Francis – project administrator
- Mark Hayes – art direction, design
- Mike Frost – photography

== Charts ==
| Chart (2004) | Peak position |
|---|---|
| US Billboard 200 | 122 |
| US Top R&B/Hip-Hop Albums (Billboard) | 17 |
| US Top Rap Albums (Billboard) | 15 |
