= Tha G-Code =

Studio album by Juvenile
- Released: December 14, 1999
- Recorded: 1999
- Genres: Gangsta rap; Southern hip hop
- Length: 70:29
- Labels: Cash Money; Universal
- Producers: Mannie Fresh; Bryan "Baby Birdman" Williams (exec.); Ronald "Slim" Williams (exec.)

Juvenile chronology
400 Degreez (1998)	Tha G-Code (1999)	Project English (2001)

Singles from Tha G-Code
- 1. "U Understand" Released: November 25, 1999; 2. "I Got That Fire" Released: January 29, 2000

Professional ratings
Review scores
Source	Rating
AllMusic	3/5 stars
Chicago Tribune	(mixed)
Entertainment Weekly	B+
NME	5/10
Q	4/5 stars
RapReviews	8.5/10
Rolling Stone	3/5 stars
The Source	3.5/5 stars
USA Today	3/4 stars
The Village Voice	(1-star Honorable Mention)

Tha G-Code is the fourth studio album by American rapper Juvenile. The album was released December 14, 1999 on Cash Money Records. It features the hit singles "U Understand" and "I Got That Fire".

The album was not as successful as Juvenile's previous album, 400 Degreez, but it did reach number 10 on the US Billboard 200 with first week sales of over 290,000 copies and also topped the Top R&B/Hip-Hop Albums chart during the first week of 2000. The album was certified Platinum by the RIAA on January 24, 2000, for sales of one million copies.

== Track listing ==
- All songs produced by Mannie Fresh.

No.	Title	Length
1.	"Big Tymer (Intro)" (featuring Lovely and Atrice)	2:14
2.	"U Understand"	4:19
3.	"F*ck That N*gga" (featuring B.G.)	4:36
4.	"A Million and One Things" (featuring the Hot Boys)	4:45
5.	"Take Them 5"	4:37
6.	"G-Code" (featuring Lil Wayne)	4:34
7.	"Something Got 2 Shake" (featuring Big Tymers)	4:09
8.	"Da Magnolia"	4:40
9.	"Catch Your Cut" (featuring B.G.)	3:42
10.	"Lil' Boyz" (featuring Big Tymers and Lil Wayne)	4:12
11.	"Get It Right" (featuring Lil Wayne and B.G.)	3:54
12.	"Never Had Sh*t" (featuring Big Tymers, B.G., and Turk)	4:13
13.	"I Got That Fire" (featuring Mannie Fresh)	5:46
14.	"Tha Man"	3:07
15.	"March N*gga Step"	4:02
16.	"Guerrilla"	5:11

== Charts ==
=== Weekly charts ===
Chart (1999)	Peak position
US Billboard 200	10
US Top R&B/Hip-Hop Albums (Billboard)	1

=== Year-end charts ===
Chart (2000)	Position
US Billboard 200	62
US Top R&B/Hip-Hop Albums (Billboard)	14

== Certifications ==
Region	Certification	Certified units/sales
United States (RIAA)	Platinum	1,000,000^{^}
^{^} Shipments figures based on certification alone.
