= Juvenile (rapper) =

American rapper (born 1975)

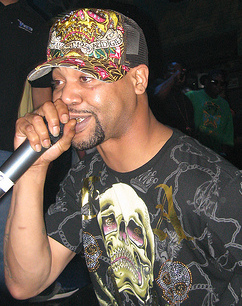
- Juvenile performing in 2008

Background information
- Born: Terius Gray; March 26, 1975 (age 51); New Orleans, Louisiana, U.S.
- Genres: Hip-hop; bounce
- Occupations: Rapper; songwriter; actor
- Works: Juvenile discography
- Years active: 1991–present
- Labels: Universal; Cash Money; Fontana; UTP; Rap-A-Lot; Atlantic; Warlock
- Formerly of: Hot Boys; Cash Money Millionaires; UTP Playas

Terius Gray (born March 26, 1975), better known by his stage name Juvenile, is an American rapper best known for his work with Birdman's Cash Money Records in the late 1990s and early 2000s, both solo and as a member of the label's then-flagship group, Hot Boys.

Juvenile's career began in the early 1990s as a teenager with bounce music recordings that earned him local recognition. After releasing his debut studio album—Being Myself (1995)—to regional success, he signed with Cash Money and saw his mainstream breakthrough with his second and third albums, Solja Rags (1997) and 400 Degreez (1998). The latter peaked at number nine on the Billboard 200, received quadruple platinum certification by the Recording Industry Association of America (RIAA), and was supported by the singles "Ha" and "Back That Azz Up" (featuring Mannie Fresh and Lil Wayne)—his first Billboard Hot 100 entries. He released three subsequent albums—Tha G-Code (1999), Project English (2001) and Juve the Great (2003)—for the label to continued success, the latter of which spawned the 2004 single "Slow Motion" (featuring Soulja Slim), which peaked atop the Billboard Hot 100 and became his only song to do so.

Following his departure from Cash Money, Juvenile briefly signed with Atlantic Records. His seventh album, Reality Check (2006) debuted atop the Billboard 200, and was followed by Cocky & Confident (2009). He then independently released the albums Beast Mode (2010), Rejuvenation (2012), and The Fundamentals (2014). During his solo work, he formed the hip hop group UTP in 2002, with whom he has released two albums; the former of which spawned the 2004 single "Nolia Clap." He returned to Cash Money in 2014.

== Early life ==
Terius Gray was born on March 26, 1975. He was raised in the Magnolia Projects in Uptown New Orleans, Louisiana's 3rd Ward and attended Our Lady of Grace Catholic School. He began rapping around age 11, which his mother disapproved of, leading him to sneak out of his house to perform. Neighbors would taunt Gray as ignorant and call him a "little juvenile", so Gray began using the rap name Juvenile as a teenager.

== Career ==
=== 1991–1997: Beginnings, Being Myself and Solja Rags ===
After being noticed at local talent shows, Juvenile made his recording debut on tracks by bounce music artist DJ Jimi, who released "It's Jimi" in 1991 and "Bounce (For the Juvenile)" in 1993. Juvenile's debut studio album, Being Myself, was released in 1994 by Warlock Records. The album did not gain much national attention and did not chart, but did fairly well on a local level.

After Being Myself, Juvenile left Warlock due to creative differences, as he disagreed with the label wanting him to record bounce music. Juvenile then got a job at a gas processing plant. After work one day, he encountered Cash Money Records CEO Bryan "Baby" Williams at a bus stop. They had a brief conversation, before Juvenile improvised a freestyle rap for Baby. Juvenile later visited Baby and producer Mannie Fresh at Cash Money Records, performing raps for about a half hour. In 1997, Juvenile released his second album Solja Rags through Cash Money. It became popular among local rap audiences, and also saw some national success as it charted on the Billboard Hot R&B/Hip-Hop Songs chart. It was the first time he worked with Cash Money Records in-house producer Mannie Fresh, who would go on to produce all of Juvenile's albums on Cash Money in their entirety except Juve the Great. Also in 1997, Juvenile joined the Hot Boys with fellow Cash Money rappers B.G., Turk, and Lil Wayne. They released their debut album as a group, Get It How U Live! that same year.

=== 1998–2002: 400 Degreez, Tha G-Code and Project English ===
Juvenile's third album, 400 Degreez, was released in November 1998. The Cash Money label entered a distribution deal from Universal Records during the same time, which gave the label further national promotion. Its first single, "Ha" was released the month prior and became his first to enter the Billboard Hot 100. The album spawned the follow up single, "Back That Azz Up" (featuring Lil Wayne and Mannie Fresh), which was released commercially in June 1999 and peaked at number 19 on the chart and number five on the Hot R&B/Hip-Hop Songs chart. This, along with wider critical praise and it becoming his best-selling album, made Juvenile a prominent figure in hip hop. However, disputes arose regarding the rights to 'Back That Azz Up,' as another New Orleans performer, DJ Jubilee, alleged that Juvenile's song closely resembled one of his own. In January 2005, the United States Court of Appeals for the Fifth Circuit in New Orleans denied the case. Capitalizing off the album's success, Warlock released a remixed version of his debut Being Myself, and commercial reissue of his second, Solja Rags that same year. In July 1999, he released his second album with Hot Boys, Guerrilla Warfare, which also received platinum certification.

Juvenile released two further solo albums for Cash Money: Tha G-Code in 1999 and Project English in 2001, which received double platinum and platinum certifications respectively by the RIAA. Moreover, the albums reached numbers ten and two respectively on the Billboard 200, but failed to match the success of 400 Degreez. UTP Records announced an album titled 600 Degreez during this time, which was never released.

=== 2003–2006: Juve the Great and Reality Check ===
In March 2003, the Hot Boys released their album, Let 'Em Burn. Juvenile's manager Aubrey Francis and Birdman met and negotiated a deal for Juvenile and CMR to release one further solo album for the latter's label. His sixth album, Juve the Great was released by Cash Money and UTP Records in December 2003. It received platinum certification and spawned the Billboard Hot 100 number-one single "Slow Motion" featuring Soulja Slim. It was the Juvenile and label's first, and Slim's only number one song prior to his death in November 2003.

In 2005, Juvenile signed with Atlantic Records as a both a solo act and for his UTP Records imprint, which was co-founded by his longtime manager Aubrey "Pied Piper" Francis and older brother Corey. The namesake group UTP (Juve, Skip, and Wacko) released the 2004 hit song "Nolia Clap" as part of the group's first album Beginning of the End (2004). The song was produced by Juvenile along with producer Donald "XL" Robertson. Juvenile also performed the song "Booty Language", which appeared on the soundtrack for the 2005 film Hustle & Flow. Juvenile's Slidell, Louisiana home was damaged during Hurricane Katrina; him, fellow New Orleans rapper Master P, and other hip hop artists raised funds and supplies for affected victims following the storm. He briefly moved to Atlanta afterwards, and in the following year, he returned to New Orleans.

Reality Check, Juvenile's 2006 album, debuted at number one on the Billboard 200 chart and remains his only release to do so. It received gold certification by the RIAA. Production began in May 2005, most of which was done at a Holiday Inn hotel room in New Orleans. Its first single was "Animal", followed by "Rodeo", "Get Ya Hustle On", "What's Happenin'", and "Way I Be Leanin'" featuring Mike Jones, Paul Wall, Skip, and Wacko. A portion of the album was recorded with engineer Stewart Cararas at his studio Paradigm Park Studios in New Orleans. Within one month, the studio suffered the wrath of Hurricane Katrina. Upon signing to Atlantic, Juvenile criticized his former label Cash Money for not giving him enough creative freedoms, as well as the Federal Emergency Management Agency over his perceptions of their handling of Hurricane Katrina. MTV journalist Shaheem Reid noted "Get Ya Hustle On" as a criticism of Ray Nagin's and the George W. Bush administration's handling of the storm.

=== 2007–2013: Cocky & Confident, Beast Mode and Rejuvenation ===
In a 2009 interview with Allhiphop.com, Juvenile stated that his album Cocky & Confident "would take a totally different direction from his last project, which was made when he was still 'mourning Katrina.'" He also revealed that he decided to work only with fresh, young producers on the album and discussed his respect for younger artists like Soulja Boy. Cocky & Confident was released in December 2009. It peaked at number 49 on the Billboard 200 and contained one charting single, "Gotta Get It", which peaked at number 53 on the Billboard R&B/Hip-Hop Singles chart. After the album, he parted ways with Atlantic. His ninth album Beast Mode was released independently in July 2010. It was preceded by the single, "Drop That Thang" in May of that year. Juvenile released his tenth studio album Rejuvenation on June 19, 2012 through Rap-A-Lot Records. The first single from the album was "Power" featuring Rick Ross. Other collaborators included Lil Wayne, DJ Khaled, and Drake.

=== 2014–present: The Fundamentals and Cash Money Reunion ===
On February 18, 2014, Juvenile released his eleventh studio album The Fundamentals. In October 2014, he confirmed that he had re-signed to Cash Money. On March 28, 2019, both Juvenile and Birdman released a joint album called Just Another Gangsta. In April 2021, Juvenile was awarded a key to the city of New Orleans by mayor LaToya Cantrell.

On June 30, 2023, Juvenile performed on NPR's Tiny Desk Concert series to positive reviews. The performance was a result of Twitter user @theylovemyke's request that Juvenile play a Tiny Desk concert in April 2023, to which Juvenile initially replied, "WTF is a Tiny Desk and no!". He subsequently changed his mind, as a result of enthusiastic fan requests to perform on the show. The performance garnered 4 million views within two weeks of its release and featured guests including Mannie Fresh, Jon Batiste, Trombone Shorty, Alvin Ford, the singing duo The Amours, and the Louisiana Philharmonic Orchestra. In September 2024, Vulture ranked it as the best tiny desk.

In March 2024, Cash Money Records released a "digital deluxe version" reissue of the album 400 Degreez (1998), adding two unreleased tracks. On March 27, 2026, Juvenile released his twelfth studio album Boiling Point. The album includes the single "B.B.B.", which became his first song in 20 years to chart on the Billboard Hot 100.

== Personal life ==
Juvenile had a daughter, Jelani, with Joy Deleston. On February 29, 2008, four-year-old Jelani was shot and killed in her home, along with mother Deleston and older half sister. It was reported that Deleston's oldest child, 17-year-old son Anthony Tyrone Terrell Jr., returned to the home after police arrived and implicated himself in the murder of his mother and siblings. Terrell was charged with three counts of murder and three counts of aggravated assault. He remains in the DeKalb County jail. Though Juvenile received some criticism for not attending the funeral for his daughter and her mother, several statements were released that the rapper was "shocked and devastated" by the event. The rapper stated that he made the decision not to appear at the funeral to prevent subsequent media attention, and was concerned that it would divert attention away from the ceremony. Terrell was given two consecutive life sentences after pleading guilty to killing Joy Deleston, 39, and her daughters, Micaiah, 11, and Jelani. Due to his age, he could not be sentenced to death in Georgia.

Juvenile endorsed Tom Steyer in the 2020 United States presidential election. A video of him dancing with Steyer to his hit song "Back That Azz Up" went viral on the internet shortly before the 2020 South Carolina Democratic primary was held.

=== Legal issues ===
In the summer of 2002, Juvenile was arrested for assaulting his barber over charges that the barber was bootlegging his music.

In January 2003, Juvenile was arrested in New Orleans on drug charges. The next month, he was sentenced to 75 hours of community service for a fight outside a nightclub in Miami, Florida in 2001.

Juvenile was involved in a legal dispute over failure to pay child support for his daughter Jelani with Joy Deleston, a deputy sheriff in Gwinnett County, Georgia. A paternity lawsuit was issued by Deleston in 2004, resulting in a DNA test and both parties agreeing that Juvenile was Jelani's father. His attorney stated that the case was resolved peacefully by consent order in 2006.

On February 25, 2010, Juvenile was arrested in Arabi, Louisiana. While Juvenile was recording music at a house there, a neighbor called police to report smelling marijuana. He was cited on a misdemeanor charge of marijuana possession and later released on bond. He pleaded guilty in August 2010 and received a suspended three-month jail sentence and six months of probation and paid a $250 fine and court costs.

In 2017, Juvenile was arrested for failing to pay $170,000 in child support.

== Business ventures ==
In 2020, Juvenile started up a furniture company called "Made by Juvie". In 2023, Juvenile teamed up with Urban South Brewery for a new flavored drink called "Juvie Juice".

== Discography ==
Studio albums

- Being Myself (1995)
- Solja Rags (1997)
- 400 Degreez (1998)
- Tha G-Code (1999)
- Project English (2001)
- Juve the Great (2003)
- Reality Check (2006)
- Cocky & Confident (2009)
- Beast Mode (2010)
- Rejuvenation (2012)
- The Fundamentals (2014)
- Boiling Point (2026)

Collaborative albums

- Get It How U Live! (with Hot Boys) (1997)
- Guerrilla Warfare (with Hot Boys) (1999)
- Baller Blockin' (with Cash Money Millionaires) (2000)
- Gotta Get It (with JT the Bigga Figga) (2002)
- Let 'Em Burn (with Hot Boys) (2003)
- The Beginning of the End (with UTP) (2004)
- Just Another Gangsta (with Birdman) (2019)

== Filmography ==
- Baller Blockin (2000)
- Juvenile: Uncovered (2001)
- UTP Live In St. Louis (2002)
- Hood Angels (2003)
- Juvenile: Street Heat (2005)
- New Orleans Exposed
- Treme (2011)
- The Power of Few (2013)
- House Party (2023)
