= Rappers from the Gulf Coast of the United States =

This is a list of rappers from the Gulf Coast of the United States, including the cities and surrounding areas of Houston, New Orleans, Baton Rouge, Mobile, Pensacola, Tampa, and Gulfport.

- 5th Ward Boyz
- 5th Ward Juvenilez
- ABN
- Aha Gazelle
- Ameer Vann
- B.G. (rapper)
- Baby Bash
- Baby Boy da Prince
- Big Hawk
- Big Mello
- Big Mike (rapper)
- Big Moe
- Big Pokey
- Birdman (rapper)
- Boss Hogg Outlawz
- Botany Boyz
- Bryan Christopher Williams
- Bun B
- Bushwick Bill
- C-Murder
- C-Note
- Chamillionaire
- Chedda Da Connect
- Chingo Bling
- Choice
- Choppa
- Chyna Whyte
- Coughee Brothaz
- Crime Boss
- Currensy
- Deep
- Devin the Dude
- DJ Jubilee
- DJ Premier
- DJ Screw
- Don Toliver
- Doughbeezy
- E.S.G.
- Expensive Taste
- Fat Pat
- Fat Tony
- Fiend (rapper)
- Flo Milli
- Flow (rapper)
- Fly Young Red
- Foxx
- Fredo Bang
- Full Blooded
- Ganksta N-I-P
- Geto Boys
- Gudda Gudda
- Hyro Da Hero
- Jay Electronica
- Joe Blakk
- Juan Gotti
- Juvenile (rapper)
- Katey Red
- Kevin Abstract
- Kevin Gates
- Khia
- Kidd Kidd
- Kirko Bangz
- Krazy (rapper)
- Lecrae
- Lil Boosie
- Lil Phat
- Lil Wayne
- Lil' Flip
- Lil' Keke
- Lil' O
- Lil' Troy
- Lil' Wil
- Lucky Luciano
- Mac (rapper)
- Mack Maine
- Magic (rapper)
- Mannie Fresh
- Master P
- Maxo Kream
- Megan Thee Stallion
- Messy Mya
- Mia X
- Mike Bleed Da BlockStarr
- Mike Jones
- Mr. 3-2
- Mr. Marcelo
- Mr. Mike
- Mr. Serv-On
- Mystikal
- Nesby Phips
- Nicky da B
- O.G. Style
- OG Ron C
- OMB Peezy
- Paul Wall
- Pimp C
- Plies (rapper)
- Rich Boy
- Rico Love
- Riff Raff
- Romeo Miller
- Sauce Walka
- SaulPaul
- Scarface
- Screwed Up Click
- Silkk the Shocker
- Sissy Nobby
- Skull Duggery (rapper)
- Slim Thug
- Soulja Slim
- South Park Mexican
- T-Wayne
- Teezo Touchdown
- Tobe Nwigwe
- Too Much Trouble
- Toya Johnson
- Trademark Da Skydiver
- Trae tha Truth
- Travis Scott
- Trinity Garden Cartel
- Turk (rapper)
- UGK
- Ugly God
- Viper
- Webbie
- Willie D
- Young Greatness
- Youngboy Never Broke Again
- Z-Ro
