= New Orleans hip-hop =

Regional style of hip-hop

- Stylistic origins: Southern hip-hop; dixieland jazz; jazz rap; mobb music; gangsta rap; electro funk; miami bass; dance music
- Cultural origins: Early 1990s, Southern United States New Orleans

Subgenres
- Bounce

Regional scenes
- New Orleans; Baton Rouge

Local scenes
- New Orleans, Louisiana

New Orleans hip-hop represents a distinct regional style, profoundly rooted in the city's unique cultural heritage, particularly its rich African-American musical traditions. It stands as a significant cultural export of Louisiana. The dominant and most recognizable subgenre within New Orleans hip-hop is bounce music, which emerged in the early 1990s. Bounce is characterized by its intensely percussive, highly rhythmic, and dance-centric nature, often featuring call-and-response vocals and localized references.

A notable duality exists in the perception and recognition of New Orleans hip hop: it is simultaneously a highly lucrative cultural export and a genre that has historically faced a degree of marginalization within its own city's dominant cultural narrative and academic discourse. This has resulted in limitations concerning venue bookings, performance opportunities, and scholarly attention. The significant economic and outward-facing cultural value of New Orleans rap stands in contrast to its struggle for institutional and academic legitimacy locally. This suggests a disconnect between the commercial and external consumption of New Orleans hip-hop versus its internal, local institutional and academic recognition.

This situation may stem from historical biases against rap as a genre, particularly when associated with specific urban communities and addressing challenging societal issues. This persistent marginalization, despite economic success, underscores ongoing struggles for cultural legitimacy and recognition for contemporary African-American art forms within historically traditional cultural centers. It highlights that commercial success does not automatically equate to full cultural acceptance or academic validation, thereby emphasizing the critical importance of initiatives like the NOLA Hip Hop Archive in addressing this documentation gap and ensuring these cultural contributions are properly preserved and acknowledged.

== Origins and early development ==
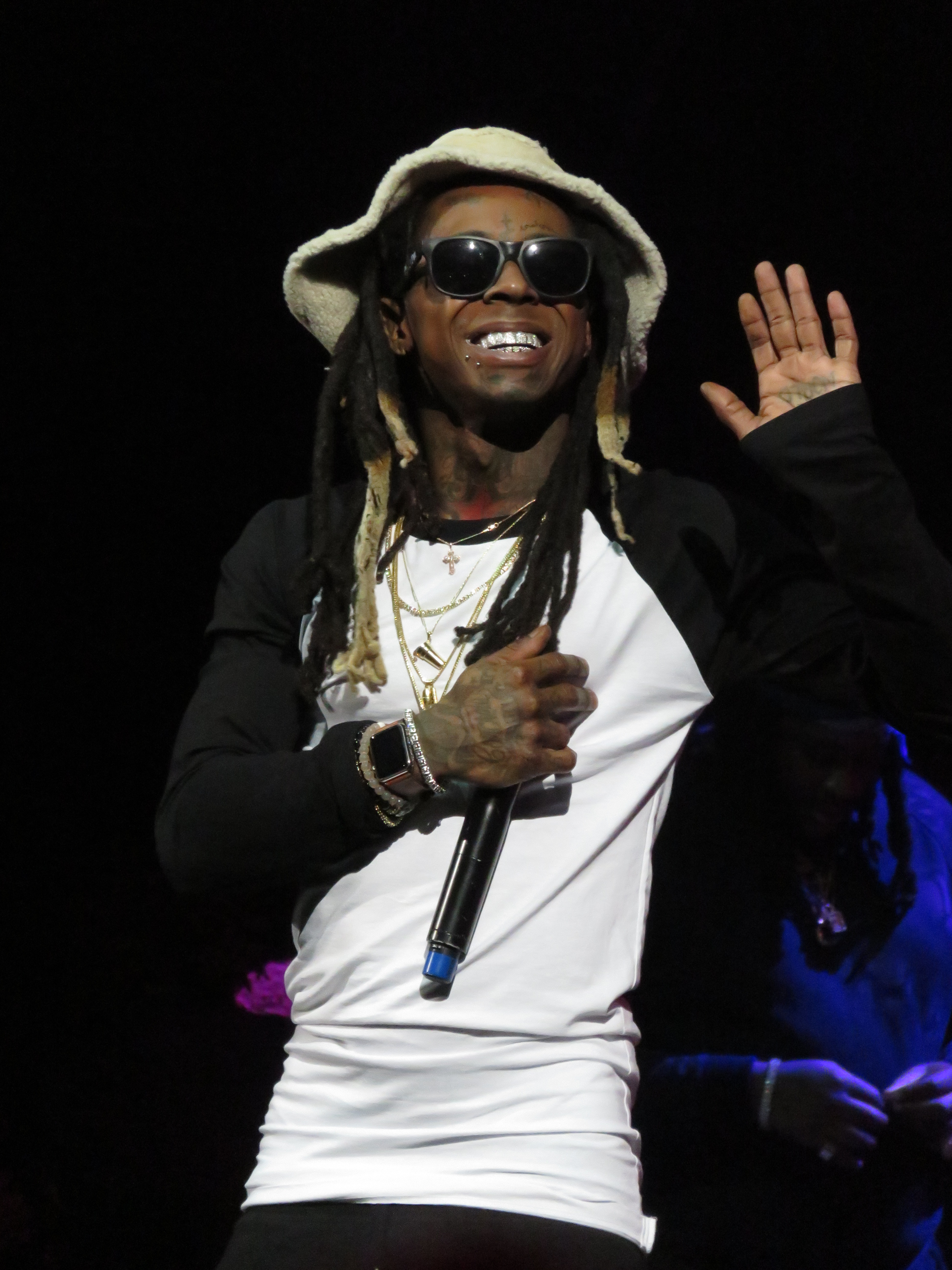
Lil Wayne, one of the most influential rappers from New Orleans

New Orleans hip hop originated from a decade of local musical activity in the late 1980s, culminating in the distinct style known as "bounce" in the early 1990s. The genre is profoundly influenced by New Orleans' traditional African-American musical forms. These include Mardi Gras Indian chants, brass band music, and second-line parades, which are frequently integrated into bounce tracks through sampling or live instrumentation. For example, the incorporation of the Rebirth Brass Band's "I Feel Like Funkin' It Up" on Da Sha Ra’s "I Feel Like Bootin' Up" (1993) exemplifies this direct musical integration.

While intensely local in its expression, foundational elements of bounce music also drew from external influences. Key examples include the "Triggaman bells" and 808 drum-machine beats sampled from The Showboys' 1986 single "Drag Rap", a track by a New York group, and instrumentals like "Brown Beats" from California DJ Cameron Paul. The "Cheeky Blakk beat", a variation on "Brown Beats" created by Mannie Fresh for New Orleans rapper Cheeky Blakk in the mid-1990s, became another frequently utilized signature sound of early bounce.

Pioneering tracks include MC T. Tucker's "Where Dey At" (1991), performed over a DJ Irv backing track that sampled "Drag Rap". This song gained significant local popularity at clubs such as Uptown Hollygrove's Ghost Town. DJ Jimi subsequently recorded his own version, "Where They At", which was studio-recorded into a full-length album in 1992. Proto-bounce tracks, such as Gregory D and DJ Mannie Fresh's "Buck Jump Time (Project Rapp)" (1989), are recognized for their hyper-specific lyrical references to New Orleans neighborhoods and a distinctive sousaphone-driven bass line.

New Orleans' Skyline (1990s): Shown New Orleans Central Business District, with Hibernia Bank Building and Place St Charles skyscrapers centered.

The origins of New Orleans bounce reveal a unique synthesis of globally circulating hip hop elements with deeply localized New Orleans musical traditions. This fusion created a distinct sound that, despite its regional dominance, initially faced challenges in gaining broader national recognition. The distinctiveness of New Orleans hip hop was not solely about inventing entirely new sounds but rather about recontextualizing, reinterpreting, and localizing existing hip hop elements through a unique New Orleans cultural lens. The genre's local character was powerfully forged through the integration of indigenous New Orleans musical forms, lyrical themes (such as roll calls of wards and neighborhoods), and participatory performance styles onto these imported rhythmic foundations. This exemplifies a dynamic process of cultural adaptation and innovation, where global musical trends are localized and imbued with specific regional identity, creating something uniquely New Orleanian. The initial regional limitation, despite internal popularity, suggests that this intensely local nature, while a strength for community identity and authenticity, might have initially hindered broader mainstream appeal until artists like Big Freedia achieved crossover international audiences. This highlights the tension between local cultural preservation and global commercial viability.

== Characteristics of New Orleans bounce music ==
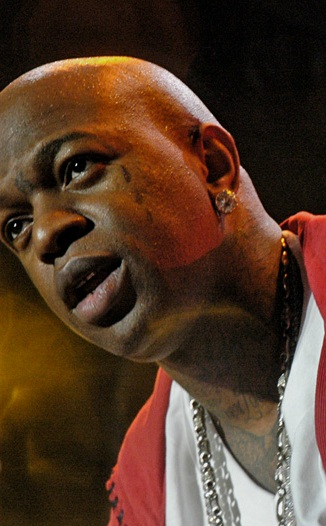
Birdman, rapper and co-founder of Cash Money Records, a major record label from New Orleans

Bounce music is fundamentally characterized by its percussive, highly rhythmic, and purposely repetitive nature, with a central focus on dance. It features extensive use of call-and-response, a tradition deeply rooted in African diasporic retentions and Mardi Gras Indian practices. This participatory element is crucial, often requiring active audience engagement. "Roll calls" of New Orleans wards and neighborhoods are a common and defining lyrical theme, alongside simple melodic lines and signature sampled sounds. The genre's beat is often derived from New Orleans second-line parades, frequently achieved using an 808 drum machine. Bounce music is intensely participatory, reflecting its identity as the "sound of the streets" and sometimes referred to as "project music" or "that/dat beat".

The term "twerking" originated within New Orleans bounce. DJ Jubilee's 1993 single "Do The Jubilee All" is recognized as containing the first recorded use of the word. Cheeky Blakk is also credited for introducing the word with her 1994 song "Twerk Something".

Initially, bounce was generally performed and recorded at mid-tempo BPMs. However, a significant post-Katrina development, exemplified by 10th Ward Buck's song "Fasta", ushered in a new, up-tempo style characterized by frenetic pacing and phrasing, which remains indicative of the genre today. This observed evolution of bounce tempo from mid-tempo to a more frenetic up-tempo style following Hurricane Katrina suggests a dynamic adaptation of the genre, potentially reflecting the city's emotional, social, and psychological shifts after the devastating disaster. The pre-Katrina norm was established by mid-tempo BPMs for more than a decade. The considerable revival of the genre after the storm, marked by the up-tempo style, shows a clear temporal correlation between the shift in tempo and the period following Hurricane Katrina. This change in tempo can be interpreted as a sonic reflection of the city's resilience, heightened energy, or even a cathartic release following the immense devastation and subsequent rebuilding efforts.

Faster tempos in music often correlate with increased energy, urgency, or a desire for intensified emotional expression. The "frenetic pacing" might mirror the urgency of recovery, the heightened emotional state of the community, or a collective drive to move forward. It could also symbolize a new, more aggressive assertion of identity in the face of adversity. This demonstrates how a musical genre can serve as a cultural barometer, adapting its core characteristics to reflect significant societal events and collective emotional states. The post-Katrina acceleration of bounce underscores its role not just as entertainment but as a living, evolving cultural expression deeply tied to the city's lived experience, its trauma, and its recovery narrative. It highlights music's capacity to both process and embody societal change.

== Major record labels and their impact ==
The burgeoning bounce scene in the early 1990s fostered the growth of a robust local music industry, with several independent record labels emerging to record and distribute the music. The simultaneous rise and success of Take Fo' Records, Cash Money Records, and No Limit Records in the 1990s, despite their distinct focuses, collectively established New Orleans as a national hip-hop powerhouse and demonstrated the immense viability and influence of independent label models in shaping the music industry.

=== Take Fo' Records ===
Founded in 1992 by Earl J. Mackie and Henry F. Holden, Take Fo' Records holds the distinction of being the first independent label to specialize in bounce music. It played a significant role in introducing bounce to the world, notably influencing the development and strategies of later major labels like Cash Money Records and No Limit Records. The label launched the careers of numerous artists, including DJ Jubilee, 5th Ward Weebie, Katey Red, and Big Freedia. DJ Jubilee's 1993 cassette single "Do The Jubilee All," which contains the first recorded use of the word "twerk," was a seminal release for the label. Take Fo' actively promoted its artists through public-access television programs like "Positive Black Talk". Its influence extended beyond the local scene, with national hits by artists like Beyoncé and Drake sampling or being influenced by Take Fo' music.

Cash Money Records logo; the label has been commonly regarded as among the most successful urban contemporary music labels of the 2000s to 2010s.

=== Cash Money Records ===
Founded in 1992 by brothers Bryan ("Birdman") Williams and Ronald ("Slim") Williams, Cash Money Records initially functioned primarily as a bounce label. With Mannie Fresh serving as the sole in-house producer for more than a decade, the label secured a groundbreaking distribution deal with Universal in 1998. This agreement propelled artists including Juvenile (with his multi-platinum album "400 Degreez" and hit "Back That Azz Up"), Lil Wayne, B.G., and the collective known as the Hot Boys to national and international success, firmly establishing New Orleans as a center of the "Dirty South" style. Mannie Fresh's distinctive production style, characterized by intricate drum patterns, the innovative use of live instrumentation in his beats, and the fusion of bounce with other genres (including strong New Orleans brass band influences), was central to Cash Money's signature sound.

=== No Limit Records ===
Established by Percy "Master P" Miller, No Limit Records also achieved national prominence in the late 1990s, significantly contributing to New Orleans' "Dirty South" influence. Master P built a formidable empire, creating a blueprint for independent success in the music industry and empowering numerous artists, including Mystikal and Silkk the Shocker. The label's "gritty" sound was largely produced by its in-house team, Beats by the Pound (later known as the Medicine Men), led by Craig "KLC" Lawson. Key releases included Master P's albums like "Ghetto D" and popular tracks such as "Make 'Em Say Uhh!".

The emergence and impact of these three labels — Take Fo' Records, Cash Money Records, and No Limit Records — in the same decade highlights the presence of an independent music ecosystem in New Orleans during the 1990s. Take Fo's focus on bounce created a foundational local market and a distinct sound, which then provided a springboard or a proof-of-concept for Cash Money and No Limit to build upon and scale to national prominence. The ability of these labels to secure major distribution deals (e.g., Cash Money with Universal, No Limit with Priority) without initially being owned by major labels showcased a powerful independent business model that became a blueprint for Southern hip-hop. The collective impact of these New Orleans-based independent labels signifies a shift in the geography of hip-hop power, moving beyond the traditional East/West Coast dominance to establish the South as a dominant force. Their success demonstrated that regional sounds, even highly localized ones like bounce, could achieve national and international commercial success through independent ingenuity, strategic distribution, and direct connection to their fan base, fundamentally reshaping the national hip-hop landscape and diversifying the industry.

== Pioneering and influential artists ==
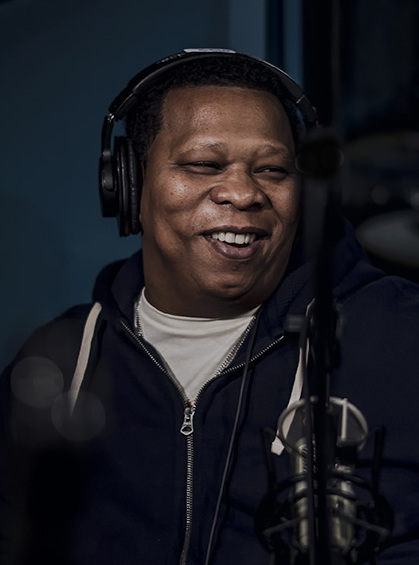
Rapper-producer Mannie Fresh (2017)

New Orleans has produced a multitude of highly influential hip-hop artists who have achieved regional, national, and global recognition, each contributing uniquely to the genre's evolution.

DJ Jubilee: Widely known as "The King of Bounce", Jerome Temple (DJ Jubilee) is considered a pioneer in the bounce music scene. He is credited with profoundly influencing the genre's distinctive sound, popularizing catchphrases (such as "twerk"), and defining its associated dances. His 1993 single "Do The Jubilee All" is a seminal work, containing the first recorded use of the word "twerk". In a testament to his enduring legacy, he headlined the first bounce show at New Orleans' Preservation Hall in 2013, a venue traditionally associated with jazz.

Mannie Fresh: A Grammy-nominated DJ, producer, and rapper, Byron O. Thomas (Mannie Fresh) served as the sole in-house producer for Cash Money Records for more than a decade. He is widely considered one of hip-hop's best producers, known for his intricate drum patterns, the innovative use of live instrumentation in his beats, and his distinct ability to combine bounce elements with other musical genres, including strong influences from New Orleans brass bands. His production for the Hot Boys (Juvenile, B.G., Turk, and Lil Wayne) and his own rap duo Big Tymers (with Birdman) launched the Cash Money label to international success, producing global hits like Juvenile's “Back That A$$ Up”.

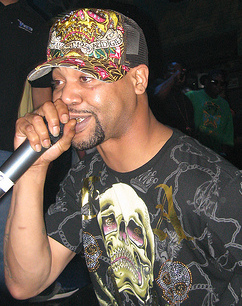
Rapper Juvenile (2008)

Juvenile: Terius Gray (Juvenile) became the face of Cash Money Records in the late 1990s. His album "400 Degreez" and its breakout hit "Back That Azz Up" are considered certified classics that were instrumental in putting New Orleans hip-hop on the national map. Juvenile's raw delivery and storytelling provided listeners with an authentic glimpse into life in New Orleans.

Master P: Percy Miller (Master P) built an empire with No Limit Records. He created a blueprint for independent success in the music industry, producing hits while empowering countless New Orleans artists. With albums like "Ghetto D" and tracks such as "Make 'Em Say Uhh!," he brought NOLA's gritty sound to the mainstream, launching the careers of artists like Mystikal and Silkk the Shocker.

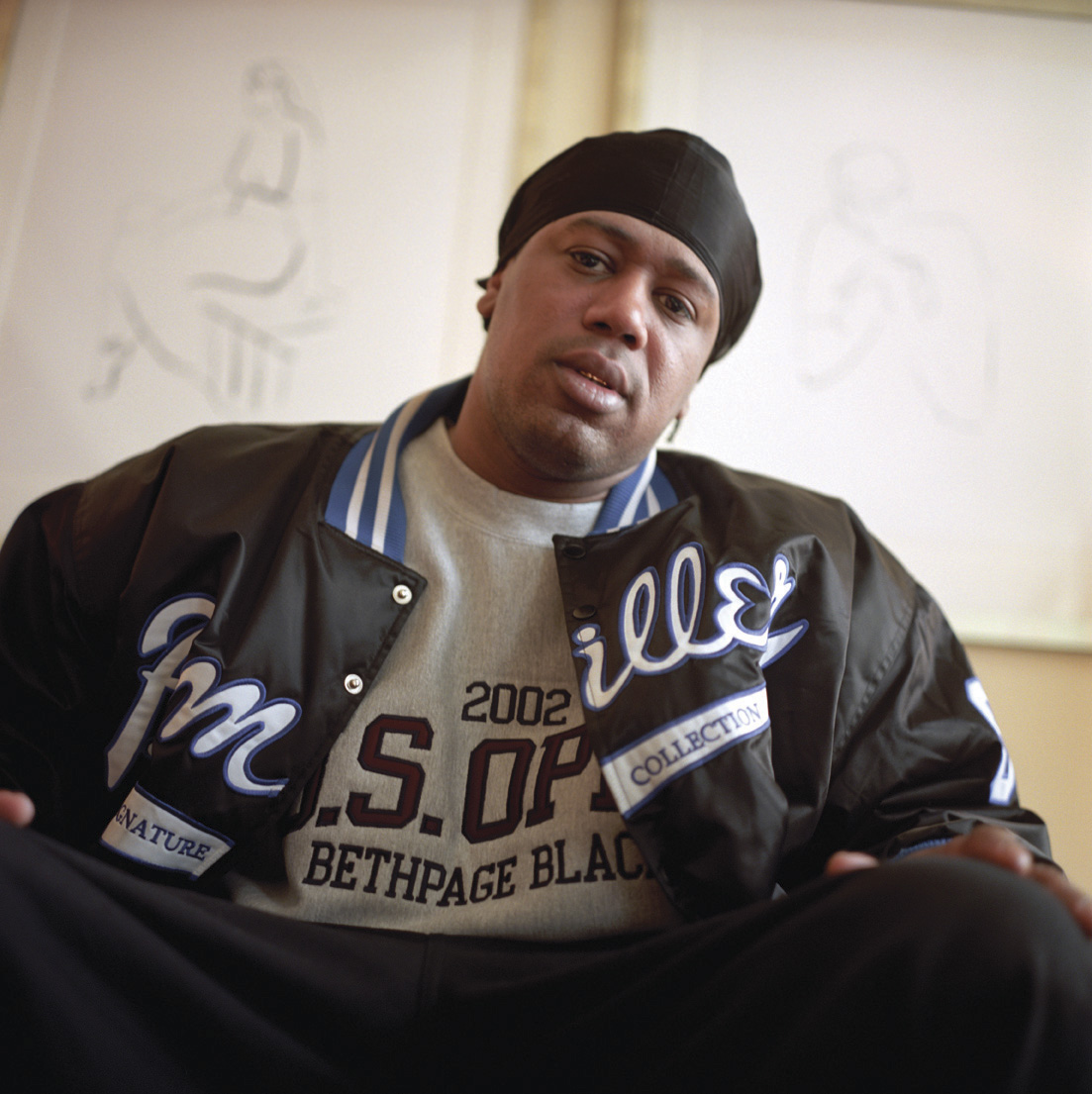
Rapper-entrepreneur Master P (2004)

Mystikal: Michael Tyler (Mystikal) brought energy and charisma to the New Orleans rap scene with his rapid speaking Southern Rasp. Known for hits like "Shake Ya Ass" and "Danger (Been So Long)," Mystikal gained popularity and signed with Big Boy Records during No Limit's golden era.

Lil Wayne: Dwayne Carter (Lil Wayne) began his career as a member of the Hot Boys and has since risen to become a global superstar. His 1999 debut album "Tha Block Is Hot" captured the reality of life in New Orleans' streets, marking the start of his career. Wayne considered the biggest rapper out of New Orleans.

Other key artists include B.G. (a cornerstone of Cash Money and Hot Boys member, known for "Bling Bling"); Ms. Tee and Magnolia Shorty (who made important inroads for female musicians at Cash Money); and Partners N Crime (popular bounce artists).

=== LGBTQ+ artists ("Sissy Bounce") ===
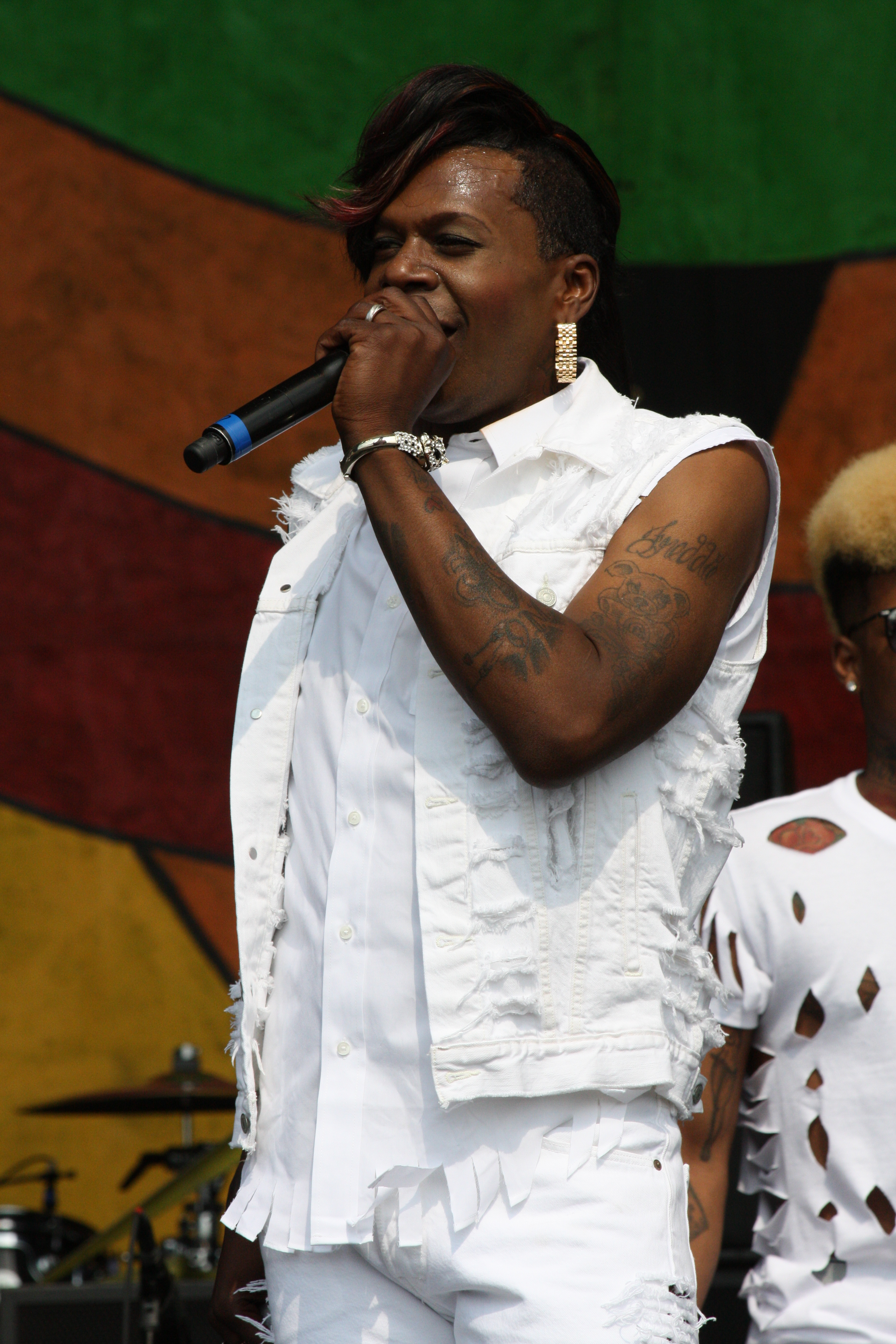
Big Freedia in 2014, an American rapper, singer and performer known for her work in the New Orleans genre of hip hop called bounce music; she has been credited with helping popularize the genre.

Beginning around 2000, New Orleans saw the emergence of a significant cohort of openly gay male rappers, often referred to as "sissies" or "punks". Katey Red, as the first queer bounce rapper, pioneered the sub-genre of "sissy-bounce". Big Freedia (Freddie Ross), the "undisputed queen of bounce music", has been instrumental in bringing the genre into the global spotlight through tracks like "Explode" and high-profile collaborations with artists such as Beyoncé on "Formation". She initially started as one of Katey Red's vocalists. Other notable LGBTQ+ artists include Sissy Nobby and Vockah Redu. The popularity and acceptance of queer artists within New Orleans bounce is partly attributed to the city's unique "carnival culture", though they have historically faced challenges in gaining broader outside exposure.

The significant role of New Orleans bounce in popularizing "twerking" globally and the concurrent rise of openly LGBTQ+ "sissy bounce" artists demonstrate how New Orleans hip-hop has uniquely influenced global dance culture while simultaneously pushing boundaries of gender and sexuality within a genre often perceived as heteronormative or homophobic. Multiple sources confirm New Orleans bounce as the origin point of "twerking," with specific artists like DJ Jubilee and Cheeky Blakk credited. The adoption of twerking by mainstream artists like Miley Cyrus in 2013 brought it into global popular culture. Simultaneously, the emergence and popularity of "sissy bounce" artists like Katey Red and Big Freedia are well-documented. It is noted that "Despite hip-hop rap often being homophobic, queer artists like Big Freedia have become very popular in bounce music".

Both twerking and the prominence of sissy bounce artists are deeply rooted in the dance-centric, participatory nature of New Orleans bounce. Twerking is a physical expression central to bounce, and sissy bounce artists are known for their high-energy, dance-focused performances. The widespread adoption of twerking globally, originating from New Orleans street culture, illustrates the profound, yet often unaccredited, influence of local African American expressive forms on mainstream popular culture. Concurrently, the success of "sissy bounce" artists directly challenges the prevailing hetero-normative and often homophobic narratives within broader hip-hop culture. This suggests a unique cultural tolerance or space for queer expression within New Orleans' specific musical and social context, potentially linked to its "carnival culture", which historically embraces fluidity and transgression. This dual impact reveals New Orleans hip-hop as a powerful engine of both cultural diffusion and social commentary. It not only exports dance trends that reshape global pop but also provides a vital platform for marginalized voices to gain prominence and acceptance within a genre that has often excluded them. This demonstrates the genre's capacity for both commercial reach and progressive cultural transformation, even if challenges for external exposure and full mainstream acceptance for queer artists remain.

== Cultural and societal impact ==
New Orleans hip-hop, particularly the bounce sub-genre, has become a significant and lucrative cultural export of Louisiana. Its influence extends globally, as evidenced by the mainstream adoption of "twerking" and high-profile collaborations by artists like Big Freedia with international superstars such as Beyoncé. The music of Take Fo' Records, for instance, has influenced contemporary hits by artists like Drake.

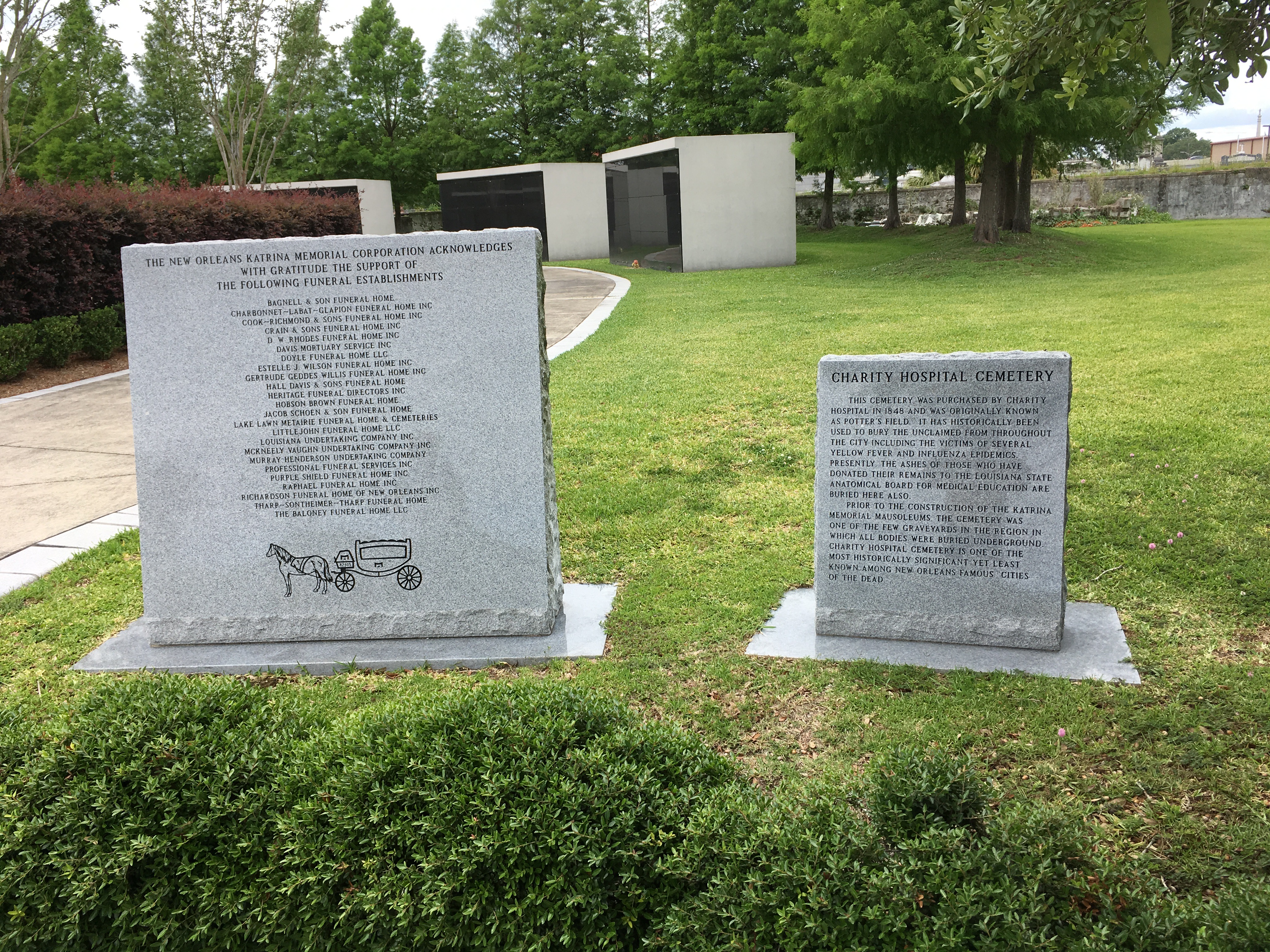
Hurricane Katrina Memorial and Charity Hospital Cemetery

=== Sociopolitical commentary and post-Katrina role ===
Rap music in New Orleans has historically served as a vehicle for addressing persistent local issues such as drugs, crime, and violence. Following the devastation of Hurricane Katrina in 2005, New Orleans hip-hop artists were among the first to demand action and create art that shed light on the countless injustices and the overt neglect of the city's poor Black residents. Prominent artists including Mos Def, Jay-Z, Public Enemy, Lil Wayne, and Juvenile actively employed hip-hop music for sociopolitical protest. The genre's role in post-Katrina recovery and expressing survivorship was also explored in cultural productions like the 2008 documentary Trouble the Water and David Simon’s HBO series Treme. Bounce music was widely used by many New Orleanians to express their frustrations with government agencies like FEMA and the Red Cross in the aftermath of the disaster. The forced displacement caused by Katrina also inadvertently led to the spread of bounce music outside New Orleans as artists relocated.

=== Critical reception and shifting status ===
Despite its commercial success and profound cultural impact, New Orleans rap has historically faced a "low ceiling of critical respectability" and has been "under-studied by scholars". It also experienced limitations in venue bookings and performance opportunities within the city's dominant cultural institutions. However, the years following Katrina brought a "marked shift in the status of New Orleans rap and bounce within the public imagination". This shift is evidenced by increased festival bookings (e.g., French Quarter Fest, Jazz Fest), and the genre's movement into historically non-rap spaces such as Preservation Hall, the Ogden Museum of Southern Art, the Tulane University Digital Library, and the Amistad Research Center. Even WWOZ 90.7FM, which once fired a DJ for playing local rap, now officially considers rap and bounce part of the New Orleans music canon.

Hurricane Katrina served as a critical inflection point for New Orleans hip-hop, transforming its critical reception and societal role from a marginalized local genre into a prominent voice for sociopolitical protest and a powerful symbol of resilience. Prior to Katrina, New Orleans rap was "marginal within the city's dominant culture," "under-studied by scholars," and faced "limited venue bookings". Furthermore, "ethnographic documentation, scholarly work and popular writing on New Orleans rap and bounce remains limited". The catastrophic event of Hurricane Katrina, and the perceived governmental failures in its aftermath, provided an undeniable and urgent platform for New Orleans hip-hop artists. Their authentic, raw, and deeply rooted voices, emerging directly from the affected communities, articulated collective trauma, anger, and resilience in a way that resonated broadly, which in turn forced a re-evaluation of the genre's cultural and social significance. This led to a "marked shift in the status of New Orleans rap and bounce within the public imagination" in the years following Katrina. This change is demonstrated by a visible increase in rap and bounce bookings for local festivals and the genre's movement into historically non-rap spaces.

The genre's transition from marginalization to a recognized voice of protest and recovery indicates that its cultural value became undeniable in the face of crisis. The increased institutional engagement (archives, festival bookings, changes in radio policy) is a direct consequence of this heightened visibility and the genre's demonstrated capacity for social commentary, community healing, and cultural preservation in a time of profound need. This trajectory highlights how major societal disruptions can force a re-evaluation and re-legitimization of previously marginalized cultural forms. New Orleans hip-hop's post-Katrina narrative serves as a powerful case study for how art can become a vital tool for collective memory, political advocacy, and cultural identity reconstruction in the aftermath of disaster, thereby cementing its lasting legacy beyond mere entertainment and into the realm of essential social commentary and historical documentation.

=== Documentation efforts ===
Crucial initiatives have emerged to address the historical lack of scholarly work and documentation. These include the NOLA Hip Hop Archive, founded in 2012 by Holly Hobbs and housed at the Amistad Research Center (the first university-affiliated rap archive in the Deep South), and the "Where They At?" project by Alison Fensterstock and Aubrey Edwards (2010), which focused on reconstructing the timeline of bounce music.

=== Identity and community ===
New Orleans rap and bounce performances frequently emphasize "extreme local" sensibilities, with artists often name-checking their specific wards and neighborhoods. This intense locality serves to ground the human experience amidst ongoing rupture, loss, and displacement, particularly after disasters. The genre actively creates and stabilizes self, community, and place, offering a safe, creative space to redraw boundaries and renegotiate power.

== See also ==
- Southern hip-hop
- East Coast hip-hop
- West Coast hip-hop
