= Katey Red =

American rapper (born 1983)

- Born: May 17, 1983 (age 43); Melpomene Projects, New Orleans, Louisiana, US
- Genres: Bounce music
- Occupation: Rapper
- Instrument: Vocals
- Years active: Late 1990s – present
- Label: Take Fo' Records

Katey Red (born May 17, 1983) is a bounce artist and M.C. from New Orleans. Red is most known for being one of the first transgender rappers in bounce music and is credited with creating the sissy bounce genre.

== Background ==
Red was born in the Melpomene Projects. She attended Walter L. Cohen High School and was part of the school's marching band.

== Career ==
In 1998, DJ Jubilee saw Red rapping at a block party in New Orleans and signed her to his label, Take Fo' Records. She released her first album in 1999, titled "Melpomene Block Party".

Considered the first openly gay bounce artist, Red developed a unique style of bounce, which is often referred to as sissy bounce. Her style is high energy, often employing call and response. She frequently performs and collaborates with other bounce artists, including Big Freedia, Sissy Nobby, Vockah Redu, and Cheeky Blakk.

In 2011, Red, along with other New Orleans bounce artists, was the subject of an exhibition at the Ogden Museum of Southern Art entitled "Where They At?". The exhibition was also taken to the Abrons Art Center in New York City and the Birdhouse Gallery in Austin.

Red is also a drag artist and performs under the name Keltnny Galliano.

== Discography ==
=== Studio albums ===
- 1999: Melpomene Block Party
- 2000: Y2 Katey
- 2013: Katey's Hits

=== Singles ===
- 1999: "Melpomene Block Party"
- "The Punk Under Pressure"

=== Music videos ===
- 2011: "Where Da Melph At", directed by David S. White
- 2012: "Dreidel Song" by Gypsyphonic Disko, appears as featured artist
- 2013: "Don't Speak (Make Ya Booty Go)", directed by David S. White

=== Collaborations ===
- 2000: It's a G Thang by K.C. Redd – performing "Tiddy Bop" with K.C. Redd
- 2002: Choppa Style by Choppa – performing "Messy B***hes" with Choppa
- 2010: Ya-Ka-May by Galactic – performing "Katey Vs Nobby" with Sissy Nobby, U.S. Billboard Chart No. 161
- 2011: New Orleans Bounce Essentials, Vol. 2 – performing "That's My Juvie" with Magnolia Shorty
- 2013: Son of Rogues Gallery: Pirate Ballads, Sea Songs & Chanteys – performing "Sally Racket" with Big Freedia and Akron / Family

== Filmography ==
| Year | Title | Role | Notes |
|---|---|---|---|
| 2011 | Treme | Herself | TV series, episode: "Santa Claus, Do You Ever Get the Blues" |
| 2011 | Prince Paul's Adventurous Musical Journey | Herself | TV series documentary, episode: "New Orleans Bounce" |
| 2014 | The Body Electric | Actor | Music video by Hurray for the Riff Raff |
| 2015 | Nola? | Herself | Documentary |
| Forthcoming | Mother | Herself | Documentary |

== Awards ==
In 2000, Red received the Best Emerging Rap/Hip-Hop Band or Performer at Offbeat magazine's Best of the Beat Awards.

== Personal life ==
Red married in 2017; her musical collaborator and friend Big Freedia was maid of honor.
