= Straight from the N.O. =

Studio album by Choppa
- Released: March 4, 2003
- Recorded: 2002–2003
- Genre: Hip hop
- Label: The New No Limit / Take Fo' Records / Universal
- Producer: Henry The Man Holden, Nik Cohn, Don Juan, Ke'Noe, Master P (exec.), Donald XL Robertson, Sinista

Choppa chronology
Choppa Style (2002)	Straight from the N.O. (2003)	Da Real Choppa (2005)

Professional ratings
Review scores
Source	Rating
AllMusic	2.9/5 stars

Straight from the N.O. is the second studio album by American rapper Choppa, released on March 4, 2003, through The New No Limit, Take Fo & Universal Records. Production for the album was handled by "Henry The Man" Holden, Nik Cohn, Don Juan, Ke'Noe, Master P, Donald XL Robertson and Sinista. There was one single released from the album: "Choppa Style". It proved to be a success for Choppa, peaking at number 54 on the Billboard 200 and #17 on the Top R&B/Hip-Hop Albums, selling 95,000 copies its first week.

== Background ==
Executive producers for Straight from the N.O. include Choppa, Donald XL Robertson and "Henry The Man" Holden.

== Track listing ==
No.	Title	Length
1.	"I'mma Be Here"	3:32
2.	"Represent Yo Block" (featuring B.G. & Master P)	3:07
3.	"Straight from the N.O." (featuring Big Man)	4:31
4.	"Choppa Style" (featuring Master P)	4:24
5.	"Dirty Dirty"	4:03
6.	"Holla At Me" (featuring Curren$y)	3:54
7.	"Brick Jungle"	5:19
8.	"Keep It Poppin'" (featuring 5th Ward Weebie & Money)	4:14
9.	"Aaahhh Oh Yeah"	3:36
10.	"Lookin' Good" (featuring Jahbo)	3:40
11.	"Hatin'" (featuring Money & Hype)	3:02
12.	"Shake It Like That" (featuring Curren$y)	4:13
13.	"Choppa Rock"	3:39
14.	"Gettin' Money" (featuring Curren$y)	3:00
15.	"Outro"	3:45
16.	"Bonus Track #1" (featuring Master P & Curren$y)	3:35
17.	"Bonus Track #2" (featuring Big Ramp)	3:30

== Charts ==
Chart performance for Straight from the N.O.
Chart (2003)	Peak position
US Billboard 200	54
US Top R&B/Hip-Hop Albums (Billboard)	17
