= Across the Water (Baby Boy da Prince album) =

Studio album by Baby Boy da Prince
- Released: March 20, 2007
- Recorded: 2006–2007
- Genre: Southern hip-hop
- Length: 1:19:16
- Labels: Take Fo'; Universal
- Producers: Dappa; D Weezy; Mannie Fresh; Paulus Boler; Play-N-Skillz; Sinista; Timmy Fingerz

Baby Boy da Prince chronology
Like Dat (2003)	Across the Water (2007)

Singles from Across the Water
- 1. "The Way I Live" Released: October 10, 2006; 2. "Naw Meen" Released: 2007

Across the Water is the second studio album and major-label debut by American rapper Baby Boy da Prince. It was officially released on March 20, 2007 via Take Fo'/Universal Records, after being leaked onto the Internet in 2006.

Produced by Paulus Boler, Dappa, D-Weezy, Mannie Fresh, Play-N-Skillz, Sinista and Timmy Fingerz, it features guest appearances from Dappa, Lil' Boosie, Lil Hidda, Mannie Fresh, Marty Bee, Nina Sky, Reality and Shoeshine.

In the United States, the album debuted at number 26 on the Billboard 200, number 14 on the Top R&B/Hip-Hop Albums and number 6 on the Top Rap Albums charts, selling about 26,000 copies in its first week. Its lead single, "The Way I Live", made it to number 21 on the Billboard Hot 100 and became Baby Boy's only hit.

== Critical reception ==
Professional ratings
Review scores
Source	Rating
AllMusic	3.5/5 stars
RapReviews	3/10

AllMusic editor David Jeffries critiqued that the record plays to Baby Boy's rapping strengths by providing him with "a well-chosen set of hood-minded producers" and pacing out the "good-timing anthems and lazy hang-out tracks" throughout the track listing, concluding that: "He's celebrating his love of hip-hop in such a natural manner that a unique voice is hardly a requirement at this point and with the highlights stacked so high, it matters even less. Label this one "infectious," "fun," and "promising."" Matt Tomer of RapReviews criticized Baby Boy for "nursery rhymin'" his materialistic content and the "bland and lifeless" production throughout the album, caliing it "a particularly depressing listen, beyond the abysmal lyrics and poor musical quality."

== Track listing ==
No.	Title	Writer(s)	Producer(s)	Length
1.	"Intro"	Lawrence Cennett; Paulus Boler	Paulus Boler	1:05
2.	"The Way I Live" (featuring Lil' Boosie)	Cennett; Torence Hatch; Juan Xavier Matthews; Morris LaCour	D Weezy	5:24
3.	"Naw Meen" (featuring Mannie Fresh)	Cennett; Byron Thomas	Mannie Fresh	3:55
4.	"Slide in Slide Out"	Cennett; Terrence Freeman	Sinista	4:10
5.	"Skit #1"			3:09
6.	"Lock Me Down"	Cennett; T. Spencer	Timmy Fingerz	4:03
7.	"Marrero" (featuring Shoeshine and Reality)	Cennett; T. Jordan; B. Craft; Daniel Torregano	Dappa	4:59
8.	"Skit #2"			3:50
9.	"Rollin' to Det"	Cennett; Boler	Paulus Boler	4:49
10.	"Monday, Tuesday, Wednesday (The Proposal Song)"	Cennett; Boler; Walter Sigler	Paulus Boler	5:08
11.	"Rich Boy"	Cennett; Boler	Paulus Boler	4:44
12.	"They Don't Know" (featuring Nina Sky)	Cennett; Nicole Albino; Natalie Albino; Boler	Paulus Boler	4:18
13.	"Who Sheed"	Cennett; Boler	Paulus Boler	3:52
14.	"Fist Rock"	Cennett; Juan Salinas; Oscar Salinas	Play-N-Skillz	4:18
15.	"Do What It Do" (featuring Dappa, Marty Bee and Lil Hidda)	Cennett; Mark Brignac; K. Hollerman; Boler	Paulus Boler	4:15
16.	"Skit #3"			2:16
17.	"Good Juge"	Cennett; J. Reese		4:14
18.	"A Rose"	Cennett; Boler	Paulus Boler	10:47
Total length:				1:19:16

== Charts ==
Chart (2007)	Peak position
US Billboard 200	26
US Top R&B/Hip-Hop Albums (Billboard)	14
US Top Rap Albums (Billboard)	6
