= P-Town Moe =

American rapper

- Born: Morris Joseph LaCour; November 15; Pigeon Town, New Orleans, Louisiana, U.S.
- Occupations: Rapper; songwriter
- Children: 4
- Musical career
- Also known as: Geronimoe; Moe
- Origin: Pigeon Town, New Orleans, Louisiana, U.S.
- Genres: Southern hip-hop; gangsta rap; bounce; trap
- Years active: 1990s–present
- Labels: Street Money Records; Take Fo' Records; Double Platinum Records
- Formerly of: Phoolish; Gangsta Connection

Instagram information
- Page: ptownmoe
- Followers: 195 thousand

Morris Joseph LaCour (born November 15), known professionally as P-Town Moe (or P. Town Moe), is an American rapper and songwriter from Pigeon Town, New Orleans, Louisiana. He gained attention in 2010s in the bounce music scene.

LaCour has largely released music independently and built up an audience on short-form and social media platforms.

== Early life ==
Morris Joseph LaCour was born on November 15 to Dorothy Mae Burns Amos (1941-2016) and Robert Harold "Bobby" LaCour. He has 7 siblings and 5 step-siblings.

LaCour graduated from Booker T. Washington High School.

== Career ==
LaCour has said he picked up his stage name "P-Town Moe" to represent his area Pigeon Town, often nicknamed "P-Town" due to controversy around the name. He took advice from his local friends, and industry peers, Jerome "5th Ward Weebie" Cosey and Johnny "Josephine Johnny" Watson, taking their names from the Fifth Ward and Josephine Street, respectively.

=== 1997: with Mr. Terror ===
LaCour frequently made music with his brother Lamont, going by Mr. Terror, in their duos Gangsta Connection, later known as Phoolish. Gangsta Connection released their album Potential To Ball in 1997 with Double Platinum Records. Phoolish was notably featured on the song "Excursionz" on the re-released version of Most Wanted in 2001.

=== 2000s ===
LaCour was shouted out by 5th Ward Weebie in the 2001 single by Master P "Rock It".

He was featured on the songs "Grab Da Wall & Rock Da Boat" on the 2002 album Ballers by 504 Boyz and "Where I’m From" on the 2004 mixtape The Prefix by Lil Wayne. Lil Wayne and P Town Moe/MT collaborated later on their mixtape in 2008 on their own remix of "Tipsy (song)".

His major feature came on the song "The Way I Live" released in 2006.

=== 2010s - present ===
In the 21st Century, LaCour has embraced his role as a mentor to the next generation of artists. He's featured in music with local artists and collaborated on comedic social media content with various New Orleans influencers.

== Artistry ==
LaCour said he was inspired by pioneering artists like Magnolia Slim and Tim Smooth. Similarly to his stage name, he aimed to have his music underscore the mutually-beneficial relationship between the city's urban landscape and its musical legacy.

Similarly to many artists from this region, LaCour, throughout his career, has navigated the volatile music industry with challenges like label disputes to struggles for creative control. He went through multiple incarcerations, which largely stunted his career growth. For the most part, he has found solace in collaboration with other artists.

At the 3rd Annual NOLA Underground Hip-Hop Awards, LaCour's song "Peter Piper," was nominated for Hottest Original Bounce Song. This song also platformed the viral sensation of New Orleans duo, NickNack PattiWhack and Dan Rue.

== Personal life ==
LaCour has at least four kids, three sons and one daughter. His three sons make music and go by Moe SOS, Tiny Moe and Baby Moe. His daughter is nicknamed "Princess Moe."

LaCour's father was an R&B and jazz musician.

After contracting COVID-19, LaCour began to raise awareness about the effects of the virus across Louisiana and the Greater New Orleans area.

== Discography ==
Studio albums

Collaboration albums

- Potential to Ball (with Mr. Terror as Gangsta Connection) (1997)
- Bloodline Father Son Shit (with Moe SOS) (2021)

Singles

- "Rock Da Boat" (2011)
- "Peter Piper" (2012)
- "I LIKE (NOLA BOUNCE)" (2023)

== Filmography ==
=== Film ===
Year	Title	Role	Ref.
2019	I Got the Hook-Up 2	Mr. Williams	
2022	Tryna Come Up 2	Crazy	
2023	Superish	Unnamed role	
2024	Pretty Kitty Cartel	Dino	

== Awards and recognition ==
Year	Awarding body	Award	Result	Reference
2012	Offbeat Magazine NOLA Underground Hip-Hop Awards	Hottest Original Bounce Song (for Peter Piper)	Nominated	
