= Triggerman (beat) =

Music loop

The Triggerman beat, also known as Triggaman, is a one-bar drum loop that originated from sampling "Drag Rap" by the Showboys and "Brown Beats" by Cameron Paul. The one-bar drum loop and bells were known to be used in bounce music, having been used in hundreds of records. The beat has been influential in recent hip hop music, including Juvenile's "Back That Azz Up", David Banner's "Like a Pimp", T.I. and Lil Wayne's "Ball", Drake's "Nice for What" and "In My Feelings", "Go Crazy" by Chris Brown and Young Thug, and also "Outside" by Cardi B.

== "Drag Rap" ==
The first beat was created in 1986 by Orville 'Buggs Can Can' Hall and Phillip 'Triggerman' Price, the duo went by the stage name the Showboys, for the song "Drag Rap" on Priority Records. In a studio in Hollis, Queens New York named Power Perk where owner and engineer Brian Perkins acted as the in-house keyboard session player. "Drag Rap" is regarded as "a classic rap story that lifts both its sonic and structural cues directly from Dragnet." The song references three popular commercials of that period including Wendy's Where's the Beef, Old Spice's sea shanty jingle, and Irish Spring soap, the idea for the Old Spice whistle was suggested by Jam Master Jay. The production includes beatboxing, a xylophone riff and the 'bones' piano loop which was manually played out for 6 minutes because some of the studio equipment was malfunctioning. The 808 drum machine, instrumental ostinato arpeggio pattern, "all right all right" vocal ad libs, vocal clips, five variations of drum rolls, and the 'bones' piano loop were part of what has been frequently sampled.

The record had buzz for its first month of being released in New York City but was largely a flop until it was later discovered in the southern hip hop community being first used by Memphis based DJ Spanish Fly on the song "Trigga Man" in 1990. The second song to use the triggerman beat was Kevin's 'MC. T. Tucker and DJ Irv's "Where Dey At" released in 1991. Tucker had bought "Drag Rap" at a Sam Goody during a trip to New York in 1986. After playing "Drag Rap" at parties back in New Orleans he claimed the song could be run for up to four hours straight at a time. DJ Irv would loop the song on two turntables while chants would be added by the MC. It was then recorded on cassettes known as "red tapes" and given to local radio stations being added into rotation. DJ Jimi used the beat the following year in 1992 on "Where They At", a follow-up record of sorts, which helped to spread the popularity in the local bounce scene. Labels like Cash Money Records began releasing several recordings with the beat including Magnolia Shorty, U.N.L.V., DJ Jubilee, and Ms. Tee.

The Showboys learned of the record's popularity down south after Chuck D contacted them, informing them he heard the record being played in Memphis and later a local Memphis concert promoter reached out to have the duo perform "Drag Rap" live. The label had initially lied to promoters who wanted to book the artists, saying they were dead or in jail so more royalties could be collected out of the artists pocket. After the rumours were dispelled the duo began performing in the south. As the track continued to rise in popularity it was then remixed by the original duo in 2000 as "Triggerman 2000", alongside a music video continuing on the mid-century mob theme and Dragnet references.

== "Brown Beats" and "Rock the Beat" ==
As the Triggerman beat evolved it commonly would also sample the drum pattern of Cameron Paul's "Brown Beats" or Derek B's "Rock the Beat" co-produced by Simon Harris, both were released in 1987. "Brown Beats" was from 'Beats and Pieces' a DJ tools series with beats and breaks which Paul produced, the song name derives from having sampled James Brown's The Boss and Get Up Offa That Thing. "Rock the Beat" was released by Profile Records in the United States and the signature drum break was sampled from James Brown's Funky Drummer.

Derek B's "Rock the Beat" was the original "Brown Beats" drum pattern with Paul sampling and reprogramming it for his compilation, both records were released in 1987. Paul who was based in the San Francisco Bay Area, was a popular radio and club DJ in 1980s and 1990s, while Derek B and Simon Harris were a rapper and producer based in England. Both parties were prone to sampling older funk and hip hop records to use as club edits but their geographical distances from New Orleans left somewhat of a mystery for the origin of how the sample gained traction.

Since their respective releases other mixtapes and DJ mashups have created variations of the beat such as DJ Money Fresh's "Brown Beats". The popularity of its use derived from Mannie Fresh and its first use on an instrumental which he produced for rapper Cheeky Blakk, which itself became known as the "Cheeky Blakk beat". Fresh gave praise to "Brown Beats" and "Drag Rap" and would go on to be part of his inspiration for the production on the southern hip hop classic "Back That Azz Up" by Juvenile.
