= Choppa Style =

Studio album by Choppa
- Released: January 28, 2001
- Recorded: 2000
- Genre: Bounce
- Label: Take Fo'
- Producers: Henry the Man, Choppa, DJ Ron, Sammy Huen

Choppa chronology
| Choppa Style (2001) | Straight from the N.O. (2003) |

Choppa Style is the debut album by rapper Choppa. It was released on January 28, 2001 through Take Fo Records and featured production from Choppa, Henry the Man, DJ Ron and Sammy Huen. The album made it on Billboard's Top R&B/Hip-Hop Albums, peaking at #99 on the chart, but the single "Choppa Style" managed better on the single charts, making it to #49 on the Hot R&B/Hip-Hop Singles & Tracks and #94 on the Billboard Hot 100.

== Track listing ==
| No. | Title | Length |
|---|---|---|
| 1. | "Thugged Out" | 3:11 |
| 2. | "Choppa Style (Radio)" | 4:34 |
| 3. | "That Bounce Shit" | 5:21 |
| 4. | "Choppa Style (JMK Remix)" | 5:29 |
| 5. | "Ohh Girl" | 3:37 |
| 6. | "You're the One" | 4:35 |
| 7. | "Wobble for Me" | 3:23 |
| 8. | "Hop in the Circle (Remix)" | 5:45 |
| 9. | "Messy Bitches" | 3:40 |
| 10. | "I Came to Represent" | 5:33 |
| 11. | "Tic with It" | 4:12 |
| 12. | "Ya Boy Choppa" | 6:57 |
| 13. | "One Mo' Chance" (introducing his baby sister Lil' Brittany) | 3:27 |
| 14. | "In the Morning (Remix)" (featuring Big Ramp) | 4:47 |
| 15. | "Love Me Like You Did (Remix)" | 3:22 |
| 16. | "Choppa Style (JMK Remix)" (Radio) | 3:25 |

== Charts ==
| Chart (2002) | Peak position |
|---|---|
| US Top R&B/Hip Hop Albums | 99 |

=== Singles ===
| Year | Song | Chart positions | |
| Year | Song | US Hot 100 | US Rap |
|---|---|---|---|
| 2002 | "Choppa Style" | 94 | 49 |
