= Cheeky Blakk =

- Born: Angela Sherrie Woods; April 3, 1975 (age 51); New Orleans, Louisiana, US
- Genre: Bounce music
- Years active: 1994-present
- Labels: Tombstone, Mobo, Total Respect, Danger Zone, Take Fo’, Blakk1 Entertainment
- Website: cheekyblakk.com

Angela Sherrie Woods (born April 3, 1975), known professionally as Cheeky Blakk, is a New Orleans-based rapper and performer. She is recognized as a pioneering female artist in the male-dominated New Orleans bounce scene. Her 1994 track “Twerk Something,” the first to use the term in a song, has been called one of the essential songs of the genre.

Blakk has worked with artists such as Trombone Shorty, Galactic, Charmaine Neville, and Kermit Ruffins and the Rebirth Brass Band. Her film and television credits include HBO’s Treme and FX’s American Horror Story.

== Early life and career ==
Cheeky Blakk was born in New Orleans, Louisiana, and grew up in the Lower Ninth Ward. She graduated from John McDonogh High School in 1992.

When she was 14, she began her career as a dancer for Cicely “Ju’C” Crawford McCallon, one of the first female bounce artists. Her rap career was influenced by Edgar "Pimp Daddy" Givens, a Cash Money Records artist and the father of her child, who encouraged her to develop her lyrical skills. Their relationship became the basis for a well-known lyrical rivalry, culminating in Pimp Daddy’s track "Boo-Koo Bitches,” which features the line, “Here’s another ho by the name of Cheeky Blakk.” Blakk’s response diss track included the line “Well, Pimp Daddy it’s about that time/Cheeky Blakk tell you bout your funny, fake ass rhymes.” Before Pimp Daddy’s death in 1994, they performed the songs together.

Blakk’s debut album, Gotta Be Cheeky (1994), was produced by Mobo Joe and released under Mobo Records; it featured "Twerk Somethin," which was the first song to use the term twerking in the title. She released Let Me Get That Outcha, produced by Mannie Fresh and DJ Tee on Tombstone Records in 1995, which contained the popular single "Bitch Get Off Me." Other bounce artists, including DJ Jubilee and Sissy Nobby, have used the eighth-note clapping pattern from the song, the “Cheeky Blakk beat,” on their own tracks over the years. She released F**k Bein' Faithful with Tombstone in 1996. In 1998, she released the EP Whores Pimp Niggaz 2 on Total Respect Records. That year, the Times-Picayune cited her as Total Respect's most popular artist. In 2000, now on Danger Zone records, she released Cheeky Gonna Be Cheeky; the track "Wyld Boy" also features her son Darrol "Lil' Pimp" Woods.

Blakk has also collaborated with other New Orleans artists on songs that showcase her as a bounce artist. In 2001, she recorded “Pop That Pussy” with Rebirth Brass Band, which was nominated for the Big Easy Entertainment Awards Best Song of the Year, earning her city-wide recognition. In 2005, she recorded "Act Bad With It" with Trombone Shorty, and her 2010 collaboration with funk jam band Galactic, "Do It Again (again)," was one of several tracks on the record that included major bounce artists. In 2019, she joined Choppa and DJ Jubilee to form the supergroup Bounce Royalty, which released ”Twerk Baby Twerk” on the revived Take Fo’ Records label. In 2022, PJ Morton released a new version of “New Orleans Girl” with Cheeky Blakk and the Rebirth Brass Band, which appears on the Petaluma Records soundtrack for Take Me to the River: New Orleans.

She first performed at the New Orleans Jazz & Heritage Festival in 1996. She continues to perform at festivals such as South by Southwest, Jazz Fest, and Voodoo Music + Arts Experience. She has also appeared on the long-running video program Phat Phat N All That.

She now releases music under her own label, Blakk1 Entertainment LLC.

=== Legacy in bounce music ===
Blakk participated in "Where They At," a documentary photography and oral history project on the history of New Orleans bounce and hip-hop, produced by music historian Alison Fensterstock and photographer Aubrey Edwards. First shown at the Smithsonian-affiliated Ogden Museum of Southern Art, the exhibit also traveled to several U.S. cities and Berlin. The materials, including Blakk’s interview, an interview with her son, and a portrait of the two are now housed at the Amistad Research Center.

Blakk is credited with bringing “twerk” into the lexicon; journalists and musicologists argue that her contribution is often ignored because she is a Black woman from New Orleans. She is often an authoritative voice on bounce history, appearing on panels at South by Southwest and in courses at Tulane University.

=== In popular culture ===
Local DJ Davis Rogan, who inspired the Treme character Davis McAlary, was fired from his WWOZ show The Brass Band Jam in 2001 for playing “too much hip-hop,” including Blakk’s music, on air. She has appeared on stage with Rogan and performed with Steve Zahn’s McAlary character in Treme, where they sang a duet called "I Quit."

== Personal life ==
Woods is a graduate of Delgado Community College and the Delgado Charity School of Nursing. She works as a registered nurse and has one son, Darrol "Lil' Pimp" Woods, who died in 2023.

After Hurricane Katrina, she was displaced to Houston. She returned to New Orleans and lives in the 9th Ward.

== Discography ==
=== Albums & EPs ===
- Gotta Be Cheeky (1994)
- Let Me Get That Outcha (1995)
- F**k Bein' Faithful (1996)
- Whores Pimp Niggaz 2 (1998)
- Cheeky Gonna Be Cheeky (2000)

=== Singles ===
- "Lef Cheek Rite Cheek," Shake Twerk & Wobble Vol. 1 (2007)

=== Music videos ===
- “Do It Again (again),” Galactic, 2010
- ”New Orleans Girl,” PJ Morton w/Rebirth Brass Band (2022)

=== Appearances ===
- “Pop That Pussy,” Hot Venom, Rebirth Brass Band (2001)
- "Act Bad With It," Orleans & Claiborne, Trombone Shorty & Orleans Avenue (2005)
- ”Do It Again (again),” Ya-Ka-May, Galactic (2010)
- "Donut Shop Bounce," Donut Shop Bounce EP, Japanther (2014)
- "Down For My City," Poetry in Motion, The Soul Rebels (2019)
- ”Twerk Baby Twerk,” Bounce Royalty (Cheeky Blakk, DJ Jubilee, Choppa), Take Fo’ Records (2019)
- ”New Orleans Girl,” Take Me to the River: New Orleans soundtrack, PJ Morton w/Rebirth Brass Band (2022)

== Film and television appearances ==
| Year | Title | Role | Notes | Source |
|---|---|---|---|---|
| 2012 | Treme | Herself | S3, Ep 10 | |
| 2013 | Treme | Herself | S4, Ep 1 | |
| 2014 | American Horror Story | Hungry Woman | S3, Ep 12 | |
| 2022 | Take Me to the River: New Orleans | Herself | Documentary | |
| 2020 | Hip-Hop Evolution | Herself | S4, Ep 1 | |
| 2008 | Ya Heard Me? | Herself | Documentary | |
