= Melpomene Projects =

Housing development in New Orleans, Louisiana, United States

Melpomene Street Housing Development
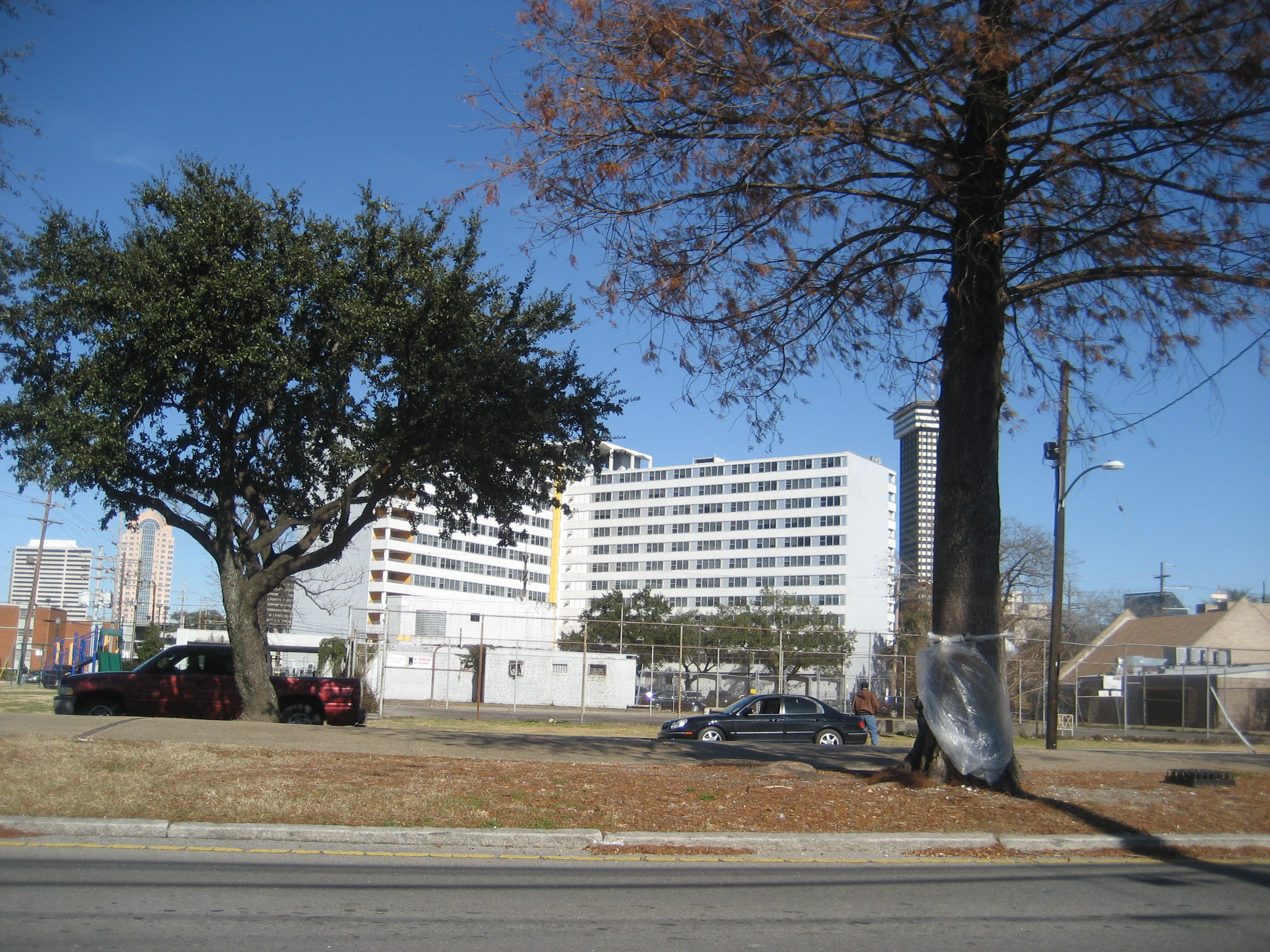
- Guste highrise apartment building, Melpomene Projects, seen from Martin Luther King Boulevard, New Orleans
- Interactive map of Melpomene Street Housing Development

General information
- Location: 1301 Simon Bolivar, New Orleans, LA 70113; United States
- Coordinates: 29°56′41″N 90°04′57″W
- Status: Rebuilt

Construction
- Constructed: 1963-64

Listing
- Demolished: 2004-2011

Other information
- Governing body: Housing Authority of New Orleans

The Melpomene Projects, officially called the Gustavo Apartments or The Guste Homes, and colloquially The Melph, are a housing complex located in the Central City neighborhood of New Orleans.

The complex occupies ten city blocks, bounded roughly by South Robertson Street, Clio Street, Simon Bolivar Avenue and Martin Luther King Jr. Boulevard (formerly Melpomene Avenue). There were four three-story buildings and two four-story buildings for families and a high-rise for the elderly. At a peak height of 12 stories, the Guste high-rise is the tallest public housing complex in the city.

== History ==
The Melpomene Project was constructed in 1964. The site was once made up of single and multi-family houses; by the late 1950s the city declared them slums which paved the way for the project. It is the youngest surviving housing project in New Orleans.

The high-rise underwent major renovations in 2002.

In 2004, three of the six low-rise buildings were demolished after failing to meet the Housing Authority of New Orleans' economic viability guidelines.

In 2006 it was one of few housing projects in the city that survived Hurricane Katrina with minimal wind damage and no flood damage.

In 2012 officials approved a $30 million bond for the final phase of redevelopment. The last building was demolished in 2013. Construction of phase III began in 2013 at a cost of $61 million, through the use of $26 million from HANO, $21.9 million from FEMA, and $13.1 million in Low Income Housing Tax Credits. Gibbs Construction and Colmex Construction completed the development of the new one, two, three and four bedroom units, which include Energy Star appliances, and are also pre-wired for cable and internet services. Community supportive services provided by the Guste Resident Management Corporation are available for residents living in the community. The new Guste Homes opened in 2018 with 638 homes located on the entire Guste site; 577 of which are public housing units.
