= Mike Bleed Da BlockStarr =

American rapper (born 1985)

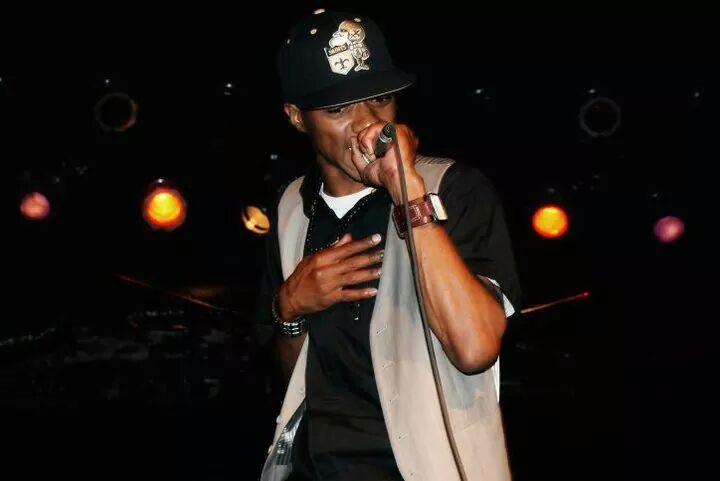
- Mike Bleed Da BlockStarr in 2014

Background information
- Also known as: Mike Bleed Da BlockStarr, Michael Carlione, Yung Coke
- Born: Michael Kerry McFarland; August 22, 1985 (age 40); New Orleans, Louisiana, U.S.
- Genres: Hip hop; rock
- Occupations: Rapper; entertainer; actor
- Years active: 2002–present
- Label: BlockStarr Incorporated
- Website: mikebleed.com

Michael Kerry McFarland (born August 22, 1985), better known by his stage name Mike Bleed Da BlockStarr or simply Mike Bleed, is an American rapper from New Orleans, Louisiana.

== Career ==
Michael started his musical career recording under the pseudonym Camaro Callione in 1999. Under the mentorship & guidance of the late Walter McCallon(Tre-8), who gave him his first opportunity to become a household name by letting him perform the chorus on McCallon's Toss It Up record from the 2 Hot 4 TV EP. Michael later changed his stage name to Michael Carlione, a nickname given to him by one of his father's friends. In 2008, Michael was first exposed to the major stage as a solo artist with his debut single BlockStarr at AllMusic, which ultimately gained him a featured performance on BET's 106 & Park's Wild Out Wednesday, and a record deal offer from Universal Republic. The single's video was shown on MTV2 and many other video shows and outlets.

After a four-year hiatus from the music industry, Michael changed his stage name for the final time to Mike Bleed Da BlockStarr, to better correspond with his self-titled musical genre HipRock & RnBleed. His recent musical popularity came in with his New Orleans Saints based theme song Dats My Team, originally released in 2012.

Mike Bleed has released a number of singles independently, including "Burn Out", "Losing It", and "I Keep A Bag", under his own record label BlockStarr Incorporated. In 2015, he became a voting member with the Recording Academy.

== Discography ==
=== Singles ===
List of singles, with selected chart positions, showing year released and album name
Title	Year	Peak chart positions			Album
Title	Year	US	US R&B	US Rap	Album
"BlockStarr"	2008	-	-	-	I'm Here
"Dats My Team"	2012	-	-	-	
"American Dream" (featuring S. Jay)	2014	-	-	-	Own My Own; The Alter Ego Prequel
"Burn Out" (featuring Jay R.)	2015	-	-	-	Own My Own; The Alter Ego Prequel
"Don't Wanna Lose Ya" (featuring S. Jay)	2016	-	-	-	Own My Own; The Alter Ego Prequel
"When It Storms In Hell" (featuring S. Jay)	2016	-	-	-	Own My Own; The Alter Ego Prequel
"I Keep A Bag"	2016	-	-	-	Alter Ego; The Fallen Of Michael Carlione
"—" denotes a recording that did not chart.

=== Albums ===
List of EPs, with selected information
Title	Album details	Peak chart positions		
Title	Album details	US	US R&B	US Rap
BlockStarr Reloaded	Released: April 19, 2014; Label: BlockStarr Incorporated; Format: CD, Digital download	-	-	-
Own My Own; The Alter Ego Prequel	Released: August 12, 2016; Label: BlockStarr Incorporated; Format: CD, Digital download	-	-	-

== Music videos ==
=== As lead artist ===
List of music videos, with directors, showing year released
Title	Year	Director(s)
"BlockStarr"	2008	Dark Rivers
"Burn Out"	2014	DeMichael Young
"I Keep A Bag"	2016	DeMichael Young
