= Bounce music =

Energetic style of New Orleans hip-hop

- Native name: NOLA Bounce
- Other names: Bounce
- Stylistic origins: East Coast hip-hop; electro; jazz
- Cultural origins: Late 1980s–early 1990s, New Orleans, Louisiana and Queens, New York (The Showboys)
- Typical instruments: Roland TR-808; turntables; synthesizer; keyboard; sampler
- Derivative forms: Dirty rap; Jersey club; crunk

Regional scenes
- New Orleans; Memphis; Houston (after Hurricane Katrina)

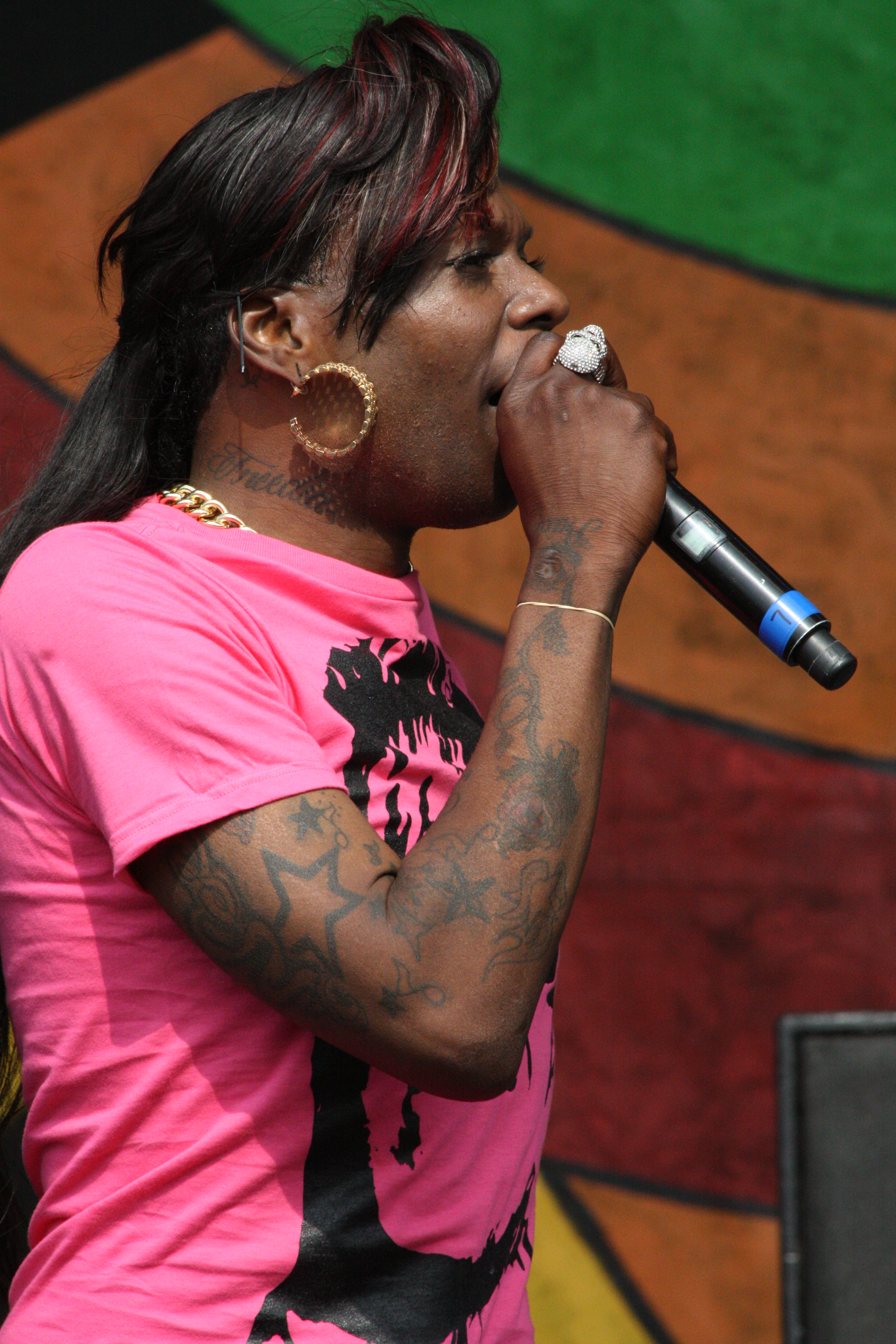
Bounce artist Big Freedia performing at New Orleans Jazz Fest 2014

Bounce music is a genre of New Orleans hip-hop music that is said to have originated as early as the late 1980s in the city's housing projects. Popular bounce artists have included DJ Jubilee, Partners-N-Crime, Magnolia Shorty and Big Freedia.

== Structure ==
Bounce is characterized by call-and-response-style party and Mardi Gras Indian chants and dance call-outs that are frequently hypersexual and controversial. These chants and call-outs are typically rapped over the "Triggerman beat", which is sampled from the songs "Drag Rap" by the Showboys and "Brown Beats" by Cameron Paul. The original recording sampled by Paul was "Rock the Beat" by British rapper Derek B, produced by Simon Harris and released in early 1987 on the Music of Life British hip-hop label in the UK. The sound of bounce has primarily been shaped by the recycling and imitation of the Simon Harris produced "Drag Rap" beat: its opening chromatic tics, the intermittent shouting of the word "break", the use of whistling as an instrumental element (as occurs in the bridge), the vocoded "drag rap" vocal and its brief and repetitive melody and quick beat (which were produced with use of synthesizers and drum machines and are easily sampled or reproduced using like-sounding elements). Typical of bounce music is the "shouting out" of or acknowledgment of geographical areas, neighborhoods and housing projects, particularly of the New Orleans area.

== History ==
As hip-hop started to spread outward from its birthplace in the Bronx, one of the new localities that embraced and advanced the genre was New Orleans. Local producers and record label owners with past success in other black genres tried their hand at hip-hop, but soon a new generation got involved. Kevin "MC T. Tucker" Ventry, one of the first bounce artists, captured the attention of the city in 1991 with his style of rap "defined by a preference for chanted refrains... and the use of several core samples to form the backing music", two characteristics that came to signify bounce music. Take Fo' Records was the first record label to specialize in Bounce music. Take Fo’ launched the careers of several bounce artists, such as DJ Jubilee, Choppa, Baby Boy da Prince, 5th Ward Weebie, Katey Red, and Big Freedia. Other early bounce artists included DJ Jimi, Partners-N-Crime, Hot Boy Ronald, Juvenile, U.N.L.V. and Magnolia Shorty up until her death. The subgenre flourished in the city without much national recognition, but soon New Orleans’ artists would take over the country. In the second half of the 1990s, No Limit Records and Cash Money Records, led by Master P, Beats by the Pound and Birdman, Mannie Fresh respectively, took over. Those artists, while based in bounce music, certainly saw their ties to the art form "become progressively more tenuous as their national exposure and wealth increased."

== Influence ==
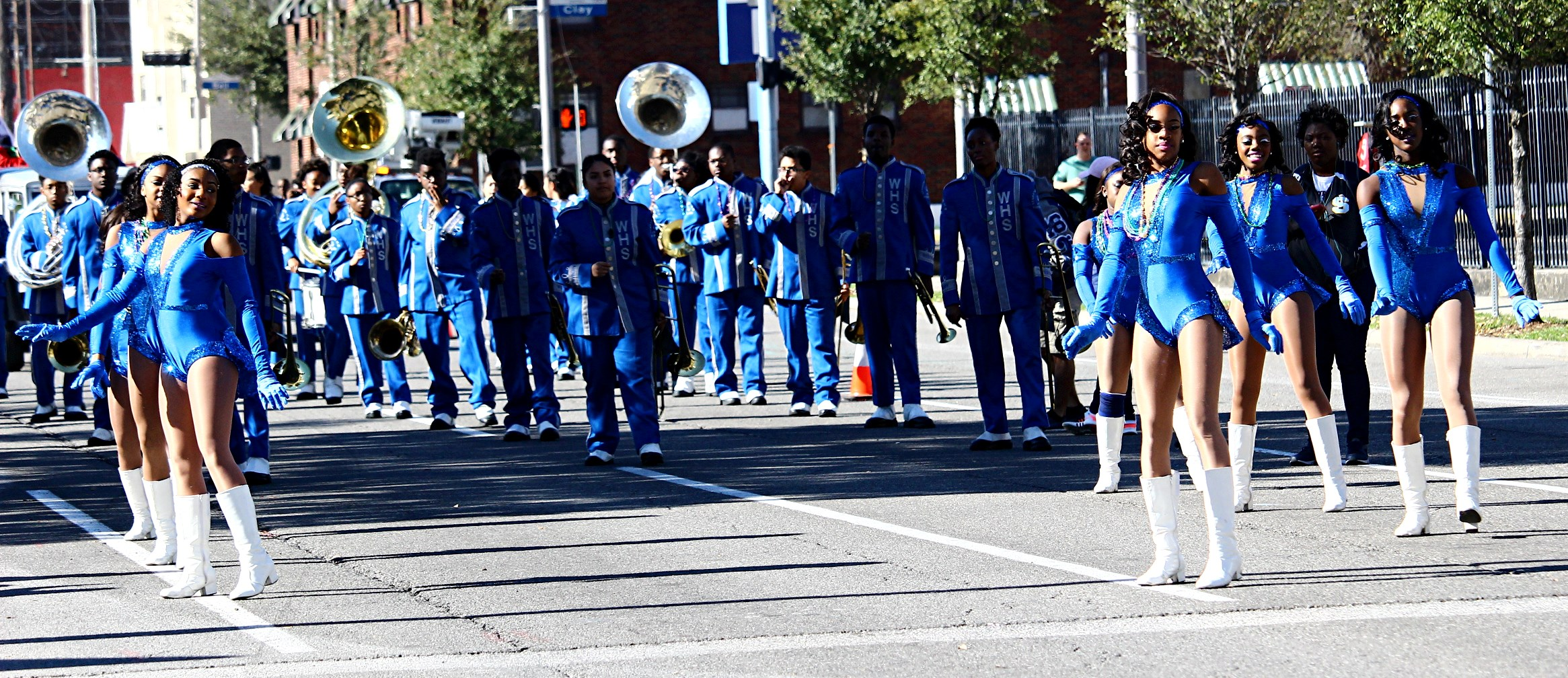
Dancers performing at Creole Festival Mardi Gras Parade in 2017

The genre maintains widespread popularity in New Orleans (the "Bounce capital of the world"), and the southern United States and has a more limited following outside the Deep South. New Orleans' music has a long tradition of gay, trans and drag performers as truly a part of musical culture, giving bounce music a significant degree of overlap with LGBT hip-hop.

Bounce, like crunk, Miami bass, Baltimore club and juke music, is a highly regional form of urban dance music, which has nevertheless influenced a variety of other rap subgenres and even emerged in the mainstream. Atlanta's crunk artists, such as Lil' Jon and the Ying Yang Twins, frequently incorporate bounce chants into their music (such as "Shake It Like A Salt Shaker") and slang (such as "twerk"). The first use of "twerk" in a bounce track was Cheeky Blakk’s 1994 "Twerk Something," on Mobo Records. Mississippi native David Banner's hit "Like A Pimp" is constructed around a screwed up sample of the "Triggerman" beat. The mixtapes of Three 6 Mafia's DJ Paul also prominently feature traditional bounce sampling. DJ Paul, a native of Memphis, TN, has, in fact, been one of the most prominent purveyors of bounce outside Louisiana, having incorporated its features into tracks produced for La Chat, Gangsta Boo and his own group, Three 6 Mafia. Another significant mainstream record influenced by bounce music was Beyoncé's 2007 release "Get Me Bodied", and more recently, "Formation". Other artists outside of the New Orleans area, such as: Mike Jones, Keezy Kilo, Hurricane Chris, Ying Yang Twins, Khia, City Girls, Big Unk, and Drake have also used elements of bounce in their music.

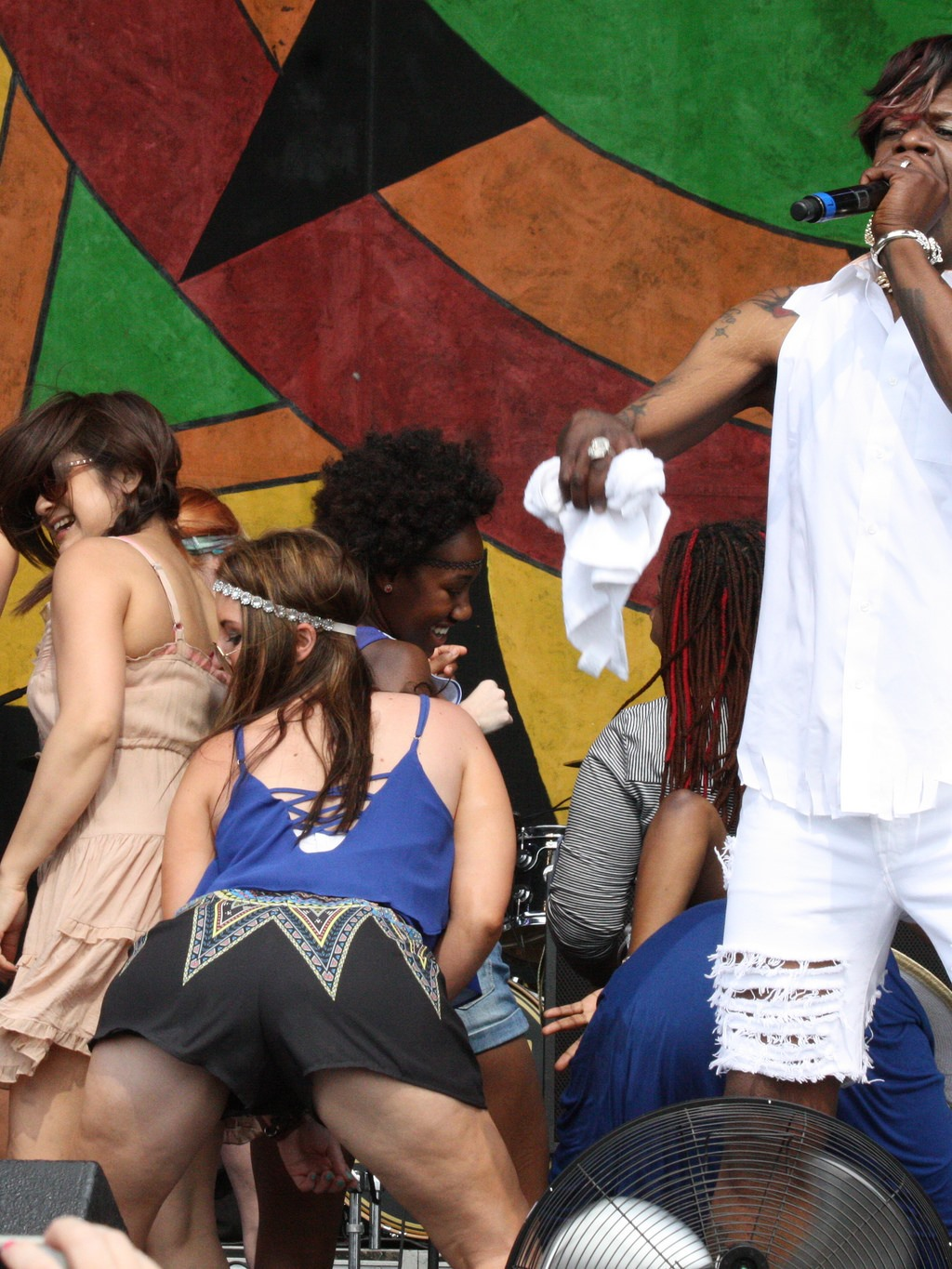
Crowd members participating and enjoying bounce music with American artist Big Freedia

In 2009, John and Glenda "Goldie" Robert created, produced, and directed a TV show titled It's All Good In The Hood that spotlighted New Orleans Bounce music artists, including Big Freedia, 5th Ward Weebie, Vockah Redu, Choppa, and many more. John and Glenda Robert later co-produced the bounce documentary "Ya Heard Me" and wrote the book "Bounce Baby Bounce Bounce Bounce".

In 2010, the Ogden Museum of Southern Art in New Orleans featured an exhibition entitled "Where They At: New Orleans Hip-Hop and Bounce in Words and Pictures", examining bounce's origins, development, and influence.

Bounce music plays a major role in the second season of HBO drama Tremé, which was broadcast in 2011 and is set in New Orleans in the aftermath of Hurricane Katrina. The season's second episode, "Everything I Do Gonh Be Funky", features a performance by bounce artists Big Freedia and Sissy Nobby. Bounce music, which had long been a staple in the city, also enjoyed a resurgence in popularity in Houston after Hurricane Katrina. Today, bounce music continues to evolve, with artists like Tim Trilioni blending traditional New Orleans sounds with contemporary influences. Another notable contemporary bounce artists include Qween Qweezy, whose album Bounce Fah Me features catchy bounce songs with modern twists.
