= The Way I Live =

Single by Baby Boy da Prince featuring Lil Boosie

from the album Across the Water
- Released: October 10, 2006
- Recorded: 2006
- Genre: Hip hop, Southern hip hop
- Length: 5:27
- Label: Republic
- Songwriters: Baby Boy da Prince, Lil Boosie, Juan Xavier Matthews
- Producer: D-Weezy

Baby Boy da Prince singles chronology
| "The Way I Live" (2006) | "Naw Meen" (2007) |

Lil Boosie singles chronology
| "Wipe Me Down" (2007) | "The Way I Live" (2007) | "Independent" (2007) |

"The Way I Live" is a 2006 single from New Orleans, Louisiana rapper Baby Boy Da Prince, from his debut album Across the Water. The track features Lil Boosie and was produced by D-Weezy. It peaked number 21 on the Billboard Hot 100 and achieved significant commercial success. There are two versions, one featuring only Lil Boosie and one featuring only P. Town Moe.

There was also a remix released entitled "The Way We Live" containing lyrics about the New Orleans Saints, making references towards various players. It received moderate airplay in the New Orleans and Mississippi regions.

== Charts ==
=== Weekly charts ===
| Chart (2006–2007) | Peak position |
|---|---|
| Brazilian Singles Chart (ABPD) | 12 |
| US Billboard Hot 100 | 21 |
| US Hot R&B/Hip-Hop Songs (Billboard) | 85 |
| US Hot Rap Songs (Billboard) | 11 |
| US Pop Airplay (Billboard) | 22 |
| US Rhythmic Airplay (Billboard) | 9 |

=== Year-end charts ===
| Chart (2007) | Position |
|---|---|
| Brazil (Crowley) | 83 |
| US Billboard Hot 100 | 53 |
| US Rhythmic (Billboard) | 27 |

== Certifications ==
| Region | Certification | Certified units/sales |
|---|---|---|
| United States (RIAA) | Platinum | 1,000,000^{^} |
^{^} Shipments figures based on certification alone.

== Release history ==
Release dates and formats for "The Way I Live"
| Region | Date | Format | Label(s) | Ref. |
|---|---|---|---|---|
| United States | October 10, 2006 | Mainstream airplay | Universal Republic | |
