= Take Fo' Records =

Record label in New Orleans

- Parent company: Positive Black Talk, Inc.
- Founded: 1992; 34 years ago
- Founder: Earl J. Mackie; Henry F. Holden
- Distributors: Big Easy Distributing; Universal Records
- Genre: Hip hop; bounce music
- Country of origin: United States
- Location: New Orleans, Louisiana
- Official website: Official website

Take Fo' Records is an independent record label from New Orleans and the first to specialize in bounce music. The label, a subsidiary of Positive Black Talk, Inc., was founded in 1992 and operated by creative duo Earl J. Mackie and Henry F. Holden until 2005. The label's distributor, Big Easy Distributing, went out of business in the late 1990s.

Prior to creating the record label, the duo teamed up to produce a cable access television program called Positive Black Talk, aiming at positive African American leadership in the New Orleans community. The television show changed its name to PBT and was later hosted by Mackie's younger cousin, Anthony Mackie, who was a student at NOCCA at the time. "It was just a 15-year-old black dude acting a fool," Anthony says of the early endeavor. After holding a fundraising concert for the program, Earl Mackie and Holden became intrigued by the music industry, so they decided to put together a girl group called Da' Sha Ra'. The newly formed group appeared frequently on the television program.

Take Fo's cornerstone was created one night while promoting the girl group at a high school dance at Walter L. Cohen High School, in the uptown section of New Orleans. Mackie and Holden met Eldon Delloyd Anderson and Jerome Temple, a.k.a. DJ Jubilee, who was the school's DJ at that time. Jubilee took the microphone to warm up the crowd and had the whole gym floor line dancing, as if they were on Soul Train. The duo were impressed, then took Anderson under their wings. Take Fo' continued to create and promote new and upcoming artists by sponsoring concerts throughout the southwest and Gulf Coast regions. Several of those concerts were hosted by Anthony Mackie.

The label continued to expand from its base and broke new ground in the Texas and Arkansas markets through Terry Wilburn who was intrigued by the growth and popularity of the label. Take Fo' Records emerged and quickly became the center of the New Orleans hip hop movement, helped introduce the world to bounce music, and influenced Cash Money Records and No Limit Records. Bounce music was a new sound at that time and Take Fo', without the help of the Internet or social media, was responsible for introducing this newest dance phenomenon.

The label has influenced and paved the way for many southern artists and several Billboard Top 10 nationally acclaimed songs in the music industry. Several significant mainstream records influenced by Take Fo' music included Beyoncé "Get Me Bodied", "Formation", "Before I Let Go", which used a sample from "Get Ready, Ready" by D.J. Jubilee and Drake's "In My Feelings" and "Nice for What". DJ Jubilee, self-billed as "The King of Bounce", achieved significant recognition for his 1993 cassette single "Do The Jubilee All". This song contains the first recorded use of the word "twerk". In November 2013, DJ Jubilee headlined the first bounce show to be performed at New Orleans' Preservation Hall with the Big Easy Bounce Band.

Take Fo' introduced Choppa and released his first single "Choppa Style", which peaked at #49 on the Hot R&B/Hip-Hop Singles & Tracks and #94 on the Billboard Hot 100. Take Fo' also introduced Baby Boy Da Prince and released his first hit single "The Way I Live", which peaked at #21 on the Billboard Hot 100.

The label re-emerged in 2019 with new singles "Twerk Baby Twerk" from Bounce Royalty (Cheeky Blakk, Choppa and DJ Jubilee) and "Ma Lil Yea" by veteran Bounce artist Monsta Wit Da Fade. Take Fo' has also launched the careers of hip-hop and R&B performers such as Lisa Amos, The Beat Doctor -7th Ward Soulja, TEC-9 from U.N.L.V., Chef Reero from Da' Sha Ra', P-Town Moe, K.C. Redd, 2-Sweet, Bigg Ramp, The Hideout, Willie Puckett, 5th Ward Weebie, Katey Red, and Big Freedia. The label's first releases featured Da' Sha Ra' and DJ Jubilee, respectively.

== See also ==
- List of record labels
