= Baby Boy da Prince =

American rapper

- Born: Lawrence Cennett; August 28, 1986 (age 39)
- Origin: New Orleans, Louisiana, United States
- Genres: Hip-hop
- Occupation: Rapper
- Years active: 2002–present
- Labels: Take Fo' Records, Universal Republic

Lawrence Cennett (born August 28, 1986), better known by his stage name Baby Boy da Prince, is a rapper from New Orleans.

His only album, Across the Water, was released on March 20, 2007. He is considered a one-hit wonder.

== Discography ==
=== Albums ===
- 2007: Across the Water

=== Singles ===
Year	Song	Chart positions			Album
Year	Song	U.S.	U.S. R&B	U.S. Rap	Album
2007	"The Way I Live" (featuring Lil Boosie)	21	85	11	Across the Water
2007	"Naw Meen" (featuring Mannie Fresh)	—	—	—	Across the Water
