= Sissy Nobby =

American bounce artist from New Orleans (born 1983)

- Born: Terrelle Gallo; May 7, 1983 (age 43); New Orleans, Louisiana, US
- Genres: Bounce music, hip hop
- Occupations: Rapper, record producer
- Years active: 2002–present

Terrelle Gallo (known by the stage name Sissy Nobby) is an American bounce artist from New Orleans, known for his hit songs, "Consequences" and "Gitty Up". He is credited as one of the main pioneers of bounce music.

== Personal life ==
Sissy Nobby's first label was Survival Records Bounce Entertainment. It was there at the age of 15 where he became known as "Sissy Nobby". Prior to this, he was known as Miss Peaches. His first hit song was titled "Yippy". His overall greatest hit to date has been "Consequences".
