= Choppa =

American rapper (born 1980 or 1981)

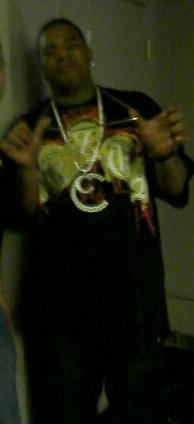
- Choppa at SportsRock in Hattiesburg, Mississippi in 2007

Background information
- Also known as: Da Real Choppa
- Born: Darwin Turner; 1980 or 1981 (age 45–46); New Orleans, Louisiana, U.S.
- Genre: Hip hop
- Occupations: Rapper; singer; songwriter
- Years active: 2000–present
- Labels: I Represent; No Limit Forever (Current) Take Fo'; The New No Limit; Universal; Body Head (Former)
- Formerly of: 504 Boyz

Darwin Turner (born 1980 or 1981), better known by his stage name Choppa, is an American rapper and singer. He is best known for his single Choppa Style, which became the unofficial anthem of the New Orleans Saints.

== History ==
His first album Choppa Style was released in 2001 by independent label Take Fo' Records. The eponymous single became a local New Orleans hit.

In 2003, his second album, Straight from the N.O., was released by Master P's No Limit Records. It rose to number 54 on the US Billboard 200.

In 2004, he joined Roy Jones Jr.'s group Body Head Bangerz. Jones's record label Body Head Entertainment released Choppa's third album Da Real Choppa in 2005 and his fourth Comin' Back Home in 2006.

In 2013, Choppa released his first mixtape, "Choppa Style". It was his first solo project in seven years.

== Personal life ==
In September 2024, Choppa and his fiancée were involved in a serious car accident that sent both of them to the hospital.

== Discography ==
=== Studio albums ===
List of studio albums, with selected chart positions and certifications
Title	Album details	Peak chart positions	
Title	Album details	US	US R&B
Choppa Style	Released: January 28, 2001; Label: Take Fo'; Format: CD, MD, LP	—	99
Straight from the N.O.	Released: March 4, 2003; Label: The New No Limit, Take Fo', Universal; Format: CD, MD, LP	54	15
Da Real Choppa	Released: September 13, 2005; Label: Street Balla, Body Head; Format: CD, MD, LP	—	—

=== Collaboration albums ===
List of collaboration albums, with selected chart positions
Title	Album details	Peak chart positions	
Title	Album details	US	US R&B
Body Head Bangerz: Volume One (with Body Head Bangerz)	Released: August 3, 2004; Label: Body Head, Universal; Formats: CD, MD, LP	—	38
It Is What It Is (with Hot Boy Ronald)	Released: 2007; Label: True Champ; Format: CD, MD, LP	—	—

=== Mixtapes ===
Choppa's mixtapes and details
Title	Mixtape details
Choppa Style	Released: September 26, 2013; Label: I Represent

=== Singles ===
==== As lead artist ====
List of singles as lead artist, with selected chart positions, showing year released and album name
Title	Year	Peak chart positions		Album
Title	Year	US	US R&B	Album
"Choppa Style"	2002	—	—	Choppa Style
"Choppa Style" (featuring Master P)	2003	94	49	Straight from the N.O.
"Woaa"	2007	—	—	—N/a
"I Feel Dat Black & Gold"	2012	—	—	—N/a
"Goin Hard" (featuring Level & Hollywood Bay Bay)	2013	—	—	—N/a
"She Got It" (featuring August Alsina)	2014	—	—	—N/a
"She Bad"	2014	—	—	—N/a
"Body" (featuring Detroit)	2014	—	—	—N/a
"Drop It Low" (featuring Joint Inc)	2015	—	—	
