= DJ Jubilee =

American rapper

- Born: Jerome Temple
- Origin: New Orleans, Louisiana, U.S.
- Genre: Bounce music
- Years active: 1991–present
- Label: Take Fo' Records
- Website: https://www.facebook.com/DJJubilee, http://www.djjubilee.com/home.html

Jerome Temple, professionally known as DJ Jubilee, also known as “The King of Bounce”, is an American rapper from New Orleans, Louisiana. Considered a pioneer in the bounce music scene with several regional hit records such as "Stop Pause (Do the Jubilee All)", he is often credited for influencing the music genre's sound, catchphrases (such as 'twerk'), and dances.

== Background ==
DJ Jubilee is originally from St. Thomas Projects in the 10th ward, in the Lower Garden District of New Orleans is a graduate of Walter L. Cohen High School and Grambling State University in Grambling, LA. He started off DJ Block parties in the St. Thomas Projects, and the surrounding neighborhoods Uptown and eventually created his own brand of Bounce Music which took off across the Gulf Coast region.

== Music career ==
Jubilee made up a thousand certified dances...and I seen on the video or tape-show where he called every--he might not have called a thousand, but he called close to five hundred of them and they did all five hundred.

— Charlie Braxton, journalist, playwright, poet, cultural critic, and music historian

DJ Jubilee, also known as “The King of Bounce” began DJing at house parties and block parties in 1990. He achieved significant recognition for his 1990 cassette single Do The Jubilee All Take Fo' Records. This song contains the first recorded use of the word 'twerk'.

DJ Jubilee's 1998 album Take It To the St. Thomas Take Fo' Records debuted at #61 on Billboard’s Top R&B albums chart for the week of May 9, 1998.

In November 2013, DJ Jubilee headlined the first bounce show to be performed at New Orleans' Preservation Hall with the Big Easy Bounce Band.

The 2000 504 Boyz hit single "Wobble Wobble" was inspired by a DJ Jubilee lyric.

== Legal issues ==
Take Fo' Records unsuccessfully sued Cash Money Records alleging that Juvenile's "Back That Azz Up" infringed the copyright of DJ Jubilee's "Back That A$$ Up".

== Discography ==
- Do The Jubilee All (1993)
- Stop Pause (1993)
- DJ Jubilee & the Cartoon Crew (1993)
- 20 Years In The Jets (1996)
- Get Ready, Ready! (1997)
- Take It To The St. Thomas (1998)
- Bouncin All Over The World (1999)
- Do Yo Thang Girl! (2000)
- Walk With It (2004)
