= Turk discography =

This is the discography of American rapper Turk.

== Albums ==
=== Studio albums ===
List of studio albums, with selected chart positions
Title	Album details	Peak chart positions		
Title	Album details	US	US Ind.	US R&B
Young & Thuggin'	Released: June 5, 2001 (US); Labels: Cash Money, Universal; Formats: CD, digital download, LP	9	—	2
Raw & Uncut	Released: August 12, 2003 (US); Label: Koch; Formats: CD, digital download, LP	193	15	22
Penitentiary Chances	Released: April 27, 2004 (US); Label: Koch; Formats: CD, digital download, LP	—	22	32
Still a Hot Boy	Released: August 21, 2005; Label: Laboratory; Formats: CD, digital download, LP	—	—	—
Convicted Felons	Released: September 5, 2006; Label: Laboratory; Formats: CD, digital download, LP	—	—	—
"—" denotes a recording that did not chart.

=== Mixtapes ===
List of mixtapes, with year released
Title	Album details
Blame It On The System	Released: February 22, 2013; Label: Self-released; Format: Digital download
Louisianimalz	Released: May 22, 2013; Label: Self-released; Format: Digital download
Reflamed	Released: March 4, 2014; Label: Self-released; Format: Digital download
Get Money Stay Real	Released: October 30, 2014; Label: Self-released; Format: Digital download
Get Money Stay Real 2	Released: July 28, 2015; Label: YNT, Cash Money; Format: Digital download
Young & Thuggin' 2	Released: 2016; Label: YNT, Cash Money; Format: Digital download
Young & Thuggin' 3	Released: 2017; Label: YNT, Cash Money; Format: Digital download

== Singles ==
=== As lead artist ===
Year	Single	Chart positions			Album
Year	Single	U.S.	U.S. R&B	U.S. Rap	Album
2001	"It's in Me"	—	—	—	Young & Thuggin'
2003	"I Luv U for Dat"	—	—	—	Raw & Uncut

=== As featured artist ===
1996 - Our Thang - Durdy Jack Lex Ball/Baby - Platinum Status

1998 - Hypnotize Cash Money - Tear Da Club Up Thugs/Hot Boys - Crazyndalazdayz

1999 - Ballas - Project Pat /Hot Boys - Ghetty Green

1999 - Bring Da Pain - Blaxuede/Lil' Wayne - Dey Don't Kno

1999 - Tha Hood (It's All Good) - Hot Boys/Big Tymers - The Wood

1999 - Make 'Em Break It - Lil' Keke/Hot Boys/Big Tymers - It Was All A Dream

1999 - Play That Sh*t (Remix) - DJ Clue/CNN/Hot Boys - Queens Day Part 1

1999 - Rock Ice - Hot Boys/Big Tymers - Blue Streak

1999 - Servin' It Hot - Servin' Da World Click/Hot Boys/Big Tymers - Shippin' N Handlin'

1999 - Tear The Club Up (Remix) - DJ Whoo Kid/Tear The Club Up Thugs/Hot Boys - DJ Whoo Kid Goin Platinum

1999 - U Don't Wanna - J Prince/Hot Boys/Big Tymers - Realest Niggaz Down South

2000 - Baller Blockin' - E-40/Baby/Juvenile - Baller Blockin'

2000 - Uptown - B.G. - Baller Blockin'

2000 - Let Us Stunt - Big Tymers/B.G. - Baller Blockin'

2000 - Hey Ya - Strings/Hot Boys/Big Tymers - Tongue Song

2000 - Told U - Malone/Baby - Hustler 3 - Hustler 3

2000 - Dirty World - T.C/Lil' Derrick/Juvenile - 3rd Coast Finest

2000 - Tear It Down - Zoe Pound/B.G. - Little Haiti Stories

2001 - Steady Grinding - Mack 10/Baby - Exit Wounds

2001 - Murder - Mack 10/Big Tymers - Bang Or Ball

2001 - Low Down & Dirty - Smoked Outt/Lil' Derrick - Done Didit

2001 - What Side R U On - Jerzey Mob/Hot Boys - Outlawz Presents

2002 - Cleanin' Out My Closet (Freestyle) - Larrell - Freestyles And Unreleased

2002 - F*ck Cash Money - Larrell - Freestyles And Unreleased

2002 - Tear It Down (Remix) Red Eye/B.G. - Da Dirty South Shit Vol. 1

2003 - Uptown Downtown - 7th Ward Soulja/B.G. - Ghetto Terminology

2003 - What You Are - Lil' Derrick/Kayotic - Undisputed Champions Knockout

2003 - Throw Your Sets Up - Tru Thug - The Storm

2003 - Tellin U - Tru Thug - The Storm

2004 - Stuntin' - Bumpy Johnson/Kenoe - Tha Hustle Life Vol.1 & Vol.2

2004 - Gun Bust - Dro/Hitman/Sammy Sam - Respect The Connected

2004 - Come Up - Froze Ony - Gutta Wayz

2004 - I Don't Know Whats Wrong - Ke'Noe - Game Over

2004 - Bitchn*gga - Mac-E/Da Inc - Da Nu Boi

2004 - Whatchabout - Mac-E - Da Nu Boi

2004 - Ain't No Fun (When Rabbit Got The Gun) - Slugga/Young Thugga - Rookie Of The Year

2004 - Murda, Murda - Yung Ro/Mippy - Undagrind

2005 - She's A Huker - AJ 003/Ying Yang Twinz - AJ 003

2005 - Over A Ho - Handy - Rap Hustlin'

2005 - Dat's Right - Iceberg/Froze Ony - Slab Muzic

2005 - Road Bitch - Iceberg/Froze Ony - Slab Muzic

== Guest appearances ==
List of non-single guest appearances, with other performing artists, showing year released and album name
Title	Year	Other artist(s)	Album
"I Did That"	1997	Juvenile, Big Moe, B.G.	Solja Rags
"Hide Out or Ride Out"	1997	Juvenile, Lil Wayne	Solja Rags
"Cash Money Niggaz"	1997	B.G., Big Tymers, Bulletproof	It's All on U, Vol. 1
"Welcome 2 tha Nolia"	1998	Juvenile	400 Degreez
"Knockout"	1999	B.G., Juvenile	Chopper City in the Ghetto
"Up to Me"	1999	Lil Wayne	Tha Block Is Hot
"You Want War"	1999	Lil Wayne	Tha Block Is Hot
"Never Had Shit"	1999	Juvenile, B.G., Baby	Tha G-Code
"Tha Man"	1999	Juvenile	Tha G-Code
"We Hustle"	2000	Big Tymers, B.G., Juvenile	I Got That Work
"What's That Smell"	2000	B.G.	Checkmate
"Set It Off" (Radio Remix)	2001	Juvenile, Lil Wayne, Baby	Project English
"Murder"	2001	Mack 10, Big Tymers	Bang or Ball
