= B.O.A.T.S. II: Me Time =

Studio album by 2 Chainz
- Released: September 10, 2013
- Recorded: 2012–2013
- Studios: Chalice; NightBird (Los Angeles); Deuce Mobile (Minneapolis); Deuce Station; Parhelion; Soundtrap (Atlanta); Hit Factory Criteria (Miami); Jungle City; Premier (New York City); Les Studios de la Seine (Paris); Mad Decent (Atwater)
- Genre: Hip-hop
- Length: 61:55
- Labels: The Real University; Def Jam
- Producers: Big Korey; D. Rich; Diplo; DJ Montay; DJ Toomp; Drumma Boy; Honorable C.N.O.T.E.; J.U.S.T.I.C.E. League; League of Starz; Mannie Fresh; Marz; Mike Will Made It; P-Nasty; Pharrell Williams; Streetrunner; Tommy Brown; V Don; Wonder Arillo

2 Chainz chronology
Based on a T.R.U. Story (2012)	B.O.A.T.S. II: Me Time (2013)	ColleGrove (2016)

Singles from B.O.A.T.S. II: Me Time
- 1. "Feds Watching" Released: June 4, 2013; 2. "Used 2" Released: September 18, 2013

B.O.A.T.S. II: Me Time (stylized as B.O.A.T.S. II #METIME) is the second studio album by American rapper 2 Chainz. It was released on September 10, 2013, by Def Jam Recordings. The album serves as a sequel to his certified platinum, Grammy-nominated debut album Based on a T.R.U. Story (2012). It features guest appearances from Pharrell Williams, Drake, Lil Wayne, Mase, Chrisette Michele, Pusha T, Fergie, Iamsu!, T-Pain, Dolla Boy, Rich Homie Quan, and Lloyd, while the production was handled by Diplo, Mike Will Made It, Drumma Boy, J.U.S.T.I.C.E. League, Mannie Fresh, Wonder Arillo, Honorable C.N.O.T.E., and DJ Toomp, among others.

B.O.A.T.S. II: Me Time was supported by two singles, "Feds Watching" and "Used 2", along with the promotional singles "Where U Been?" and "Netflix". The album received generally positive reviews from critics and debuted at number three on the US Billboard 200.

== Background ==
In 2012, after 2 Chainz has completed his concert tour, in support of his debut album Based on a T.R.U. Story (2012), he would head back to the studio to begin working on his second album. In November 2012, Epps revealed, that he was three songs deep into his second studio album. The album's estimated turn into the label date, which was set to be released in April 2013. In February 2013, while 2 Chainz and Pharrell Williams were recording for his first single, titled "Feds Watching", Epps announced that he was halfway completed with his second album. On May 23, 2013, 2 Chainz announced that he was no longer doing any features for the time being, and his second studio album will be released on September 10, 2013. On June 15, Epps announced the title as B.O.A.T.S. II: Me Time. "B.O.A.T.S." is a backronym for "Based on a T.R.U. Story".

2 Chainz told MTV, when speaking about the inspiration behind the album: "Every time somebody wants to have some "me time" or whatever, this is the type of vibe, this is the type of project [to listen to]. I'm putting together different sounds to make people be like, this is about me. Me and my people, this is our time." Epps told DJ Self from Power 105.1, speaking about the album is, "all about showing growth and maturation. It's supposed to be better than the last time.... a new way of life, I wanted to show progression on this album I wanted to show prosperity."

He explained the differences in the sound of the songs on the album to Rolling Stone. "It starts in the smallest strip club in Atlanta, and goes all the way to London and Paris. Along with the song "Live and Learn," which he says was "inspired by the wake-up call he experienced following the death of a close friend."

On August 22, 2013, 2 Chainz revealed the final track listing, via through his Instagram account. Which also revealed the guest appearances from Pharrell Williams, Fergie, Drake, Lil Wayne, Mase, Chrisette Michele, Pusha T, Iamsu!, T-Pain, Dolla Boy, Rich Homie Quan, Sunni Patterson and Lloyd. He also revealed the album's production was handled by Diplo, DJ Toomp, Drumma Boy, J.U.S.T.I.C.E. League, Mannie Fresh, Mike Will Made It, Pharrell Williams and Streetrunner, among others.

== Promotion ==
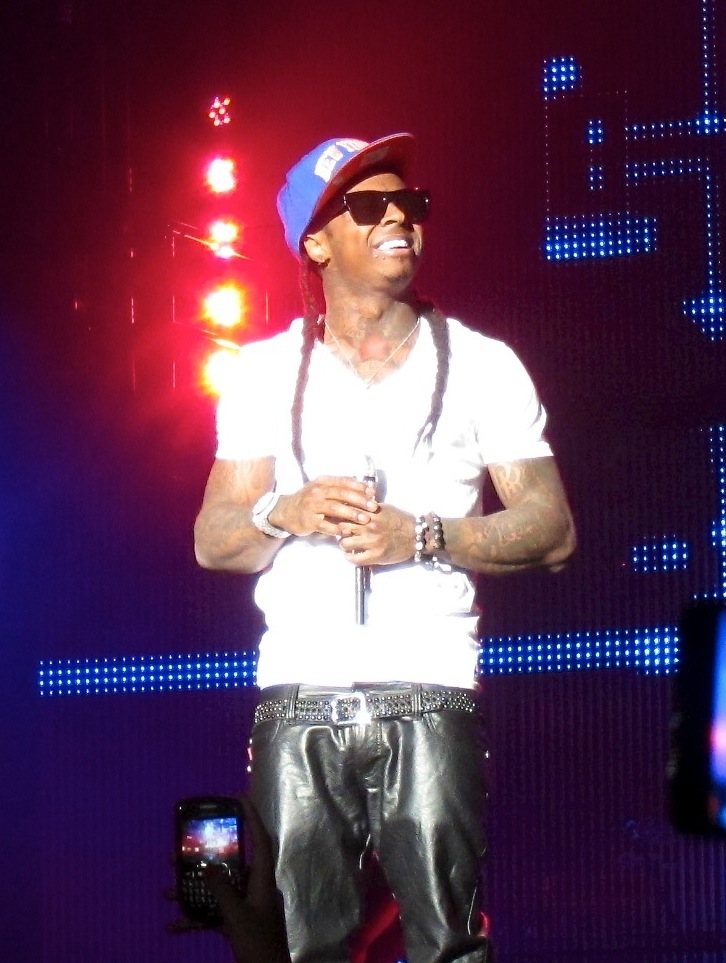
2 Chainz toured with Lil Wayne on the America's Most Wanted Festival in promotion of the album.

2 Chainz released the first video of a mini-series in promotion of the album, titled "24 Hours to Live" on July 11, 2013. In the video which was shot in South Africa, 2 Chainz reflects on his fame and fortune, while flashing back to meeting Jay-Z and Beyoncé at the NBA All-Star Game, attending the VMA Awards, BET Awards, Coachella and the ASCAP Awards along with discussing the Illuminati's pull on hip-hop. Nine days later, Chainz announced that the deluxe edition of the album would come with a cookbook with 14-15 meals, depending on the number of songs on the album. The day of the album's release the 14 meal digital cookbook, which was produced on his tour bus with Atlanta-based Chef Aleem, was revealed.

On August 6, 2013, the album cover, which was designed by Kanye West and various assets of his company DONDA, was released. On working with DONDA 2 Chainz said, "They were the first people I thought of. Their team is unprecedented. Expect next level imagery, sonics and stage performance. This is curated art. The Louvre of rap." In December 2013, Complex named it the best album cover of 2013. XXL also named it one of the best album covers of 2013.

Starting July 5, 2013, until September 1, 2013, 2 Chainz toured on the second Americas Most Wanted tour with co-headliners Lil Wayne and T.I., along with supporting acts Hit-Boy and G-Eazy. On the day of the album's release, 2 Chainz held a listening session and Q&A with New York City's Hot 97. He told Angie Martinez that he was worried about how good his first week sales would be, due to Def Jam making a mistake on the number of copies that would be shipped out. He reiterated that he was pissed off about it and that he was worried about his fans not being able to find the album in stores.

2 Chainz announced the 2 Good 2 Be T.R.U. Tour on December 9, 2013, a North American concert tour to begin on February 4, 2014, in Boston, Massachusetts and end on March 24, 2014, in Washington, D.C. The tour is being co-headlined by Def Jam label-mate Pusha T and features August Alsina and Cap.1 as opening acts.

== Singles ==
Pharrell Williams featured on and produced the album's lead single "Feds Watching".

2 Chainz premiered the lead single from the album, "Feds Watching" on June 2, 2013, at Hot 97's Summer Jam. The song features Pharrell Williams and was recorded on 2013 Grammy Awards night. The song was released to iTunes on June 4, 2013. On July 2, the music video was released and then on July 7, 2013, the song debuted at number 67 on the US Billboard Hot 100, being the second highest debut that week.

The first promotional single, "Where U Been?" featuring Cap.1 and produced by Mike Will Made It, was released on August 1, 2013. The song's music video was released on September 11, 2013. August 26, 2013, saw the debut of "Netflix" featuring Fergie, which was produced by Diplo and Honorable C.N.O.T.E. The song was made available to DJs and with the pre-order on iTunes as the album's second promotional single.

On September 17, 2013, 2 Chainz revealed that the album's second single, would be the track "Used 2". The song was produced by former Cash Money Records in-house producer Mannie Fresh and features 2 Chainz paying homage to Juvenile's flow on "Back That Azz Up". "Used 2" was serviced to mainstream urban radio in the United States on September 18, 2013. The music video was filmed in New Orleans with appearances from Hot Boys (with the exception of B.G.) and Mannie Fresh. The music video was released on October 13, 2013. On October 15, 2013, 2 Chainz performed "Used 2" with Mannie Fresh at the 2013 BET Hip Hop Awards.

The music video was released for "Fork" on November 10, 2013. On December 16, 2013, the music video for "U Da Realest" was released. On March 4, 2014, the music video was released for "Mainstream Ratchet".

== Critical reception ==
Professional ratings
Aggregate scores
Source	Rating
Metacritic	67/100
Review scores
Source	Rating
AllMusic	4/5 stars
Exclaim!	3/10
HipHopDX	2.5/5
Now	3/5
Pitchfork	6.2/10
RapReviews	5/10
Rolling Stone	3.5/5 stars
Spin	8/10
USA Today	3/4 stars
XXL	3/5

B.O.A.T.S. II: Me Time was met with generally positive reviews. At Metacritic, which assigns a normalized rating out of 100 to reviews from professional publications, the album received an average score of 67, based on 16 reviews.

Jordan Sargent of Spin said, "B.O.A.T.S. II ups the production values like a true sequel should. Whereas his last album felt at times like a mixtape in expensive packaging, the beats here are full and gleaming with the fruits of success." Jon Dolan of Rolling Stone said "his second LP further displays his knack for playfully hollering about money like he's the first guy who ever had so much paper he couldn't fold it. He tries on some new looks here but nothing slows down the self-described Black Unicorn's scene-chewing charisma." At USA Today, Elysa Garnder evoked that "2 Chainz wraps his gritty flow in bright, crisp arrangements. And he's not afraid to wax lyrical now and then, notably on the pining, lushly orchestrated "Black Unicorn"." Dan Rys of XXL stated, "while the album is billed as the continuation of his first record, last year’s No. 1-debuting Based on a T.R.U. Story, Chainz also branches out a bit in a way that makes the album feel like he’s bringing at least some new records to the table while remaining stylistically consistent." Kevin Ritchie of Now said, "Sonically, B.O.A.T.S. II is slightly more adventurous than its predecessor thanks to Pharrell’s funky summer jam "Feds Watching" and the EDM-influenced "Netflix", a Diplo-Fergie tag team. 2 Chainz likes to offset the raunchy with the heartfelt, but when the tone shifts to earnestly autobiographical, he sounds derivative." Paul Cantor of Vibe stated, "B.O.A.T.S. II: Me Time really does what it set out to do—prove that 2 Chainz, while occasionally unfocused, is more than a guy who just makes trap music. Make no mistake, there's a lot of that here, and he's almost got that formula down to science."

Julian Benbow of The Boston Globe said, "Whether it’s his horn-laced lead single, "Feds Watching", with Pharrell or the warped, taunting "Where U Been" manufactured by Mike Will Made It, he knows what hits sound like. And the only fingerprint mentor Kanye West left was the cover art. The advice he gave 2 Chainz was that with a bottomless well of charisma, it was time to stand on his own, and he's right." Kyle Kramer of Pitchfork stated, "B.O.A.T.S. II is an album that feels happy just to exist, a rejection of the modern idea that album releases are serious events and all the tracks that sound like they were fun to make get relegated to bonus cuts or mixtapes." David Jeffries of AllMusic said, "2 Chainz is still a punch-line rapper at heart, but B.O.A.T.S. II adds some Bootsy Collins charisma and ambitious ringleader style to his discography." Jesal Padania of RapReviews stated, "On "B.O.A.T.S. II: Me Time" he's put a lot more thought and effort into the construction and execution of an album. Instead of constantly rapping about spending money, he's spending a bit of "Me Time" and the end result is welcome progression." Peter Marrack of Exclaim! stated, "One thing's for certain: by the end of Me Time, the down-to-Earth, around-the-block-and-back 2 Chainz bores." Omar Burgess of HipHopDX said, "By now, most fans should know that 2 Chainz isn’t interested in providing the type of lyricism offered by emcees like Big Boi or Jay Electronica. Either way, this time around, his formula—catchy hooks, spit-take worthy one-liners and danceable, top-40 production—suffers from either overexposure or a lack of innovation."

=== Accolades ===
Closing out 2013, B.O.A.T.S. II: Me Time was named to multiple "Albums of the Year" lists by major publications. The album was ranked at number 30 on Spin's list of the 50 best albums of 2013. Complex positioned it at number 29, on their list of the 50 best albums of 2013. They commented saying, "overall, the album is surprisingly creative, jumping from cabana bounce like "Feds Watching" to the widescreen blockbuster "I Do It" to the New Orleans throwback "Used 2" to ratchet noir like "Livin'" with Iamsu!. It's tough to imagine 2 Chainz making a particularly ambitious record. His entire style is, after all, firmly middlebrow: never pretentious, but nor is it especially interested in the populist vanguard. While the ideal 2 Chainz album would probably be a hits compilation, B.O.A.T.S. II: Me Time is probably the next best thing: a consistent, front-to-back listen that celebrates a very particular aspect of hip-hop as a craft." Rolling Stone positioned in at number 11 on their list of the best hip-hop albums of 2013. They elaborated saying, "2 Chainz was inescapable this year, cresting on a string of show-stealing features and an impactful 2012 debut. On his follow-up, trap's reigning king expanded his domain: the Pharrell-produced "Feds Watching" evoked late-1970s car-chase melodrama as a soundbed for 2 Chainz' luxury raps, and album cuts explored a breadth of topics from fallen homies ("Live and Learn") to on-demand sextapes ("Netflix"). The man's chains still glisten on the cover, but his charisma shone the brightest." The album was ranked at number 21 on XXL's list of the best albums of 2013.

== Commercial performance ==
B.O.A.T.S. II: Me Time debuted at number three on the US Billboard 200 chart, selling 63,000 copies in its first week. This would be a significant drop in sales from his debut album, whose 147,000 units are more than twice as much as the sequel. In its second week of sales, the album dropped from number three to number seven on the Billboard 200, selling 35,000 copies. In its third week, the album sold 17,000 more copies. In its fourth week, the album sold 12,000 more copies. As of January 8, 2014, the album had sold 221,000 copies in the United States.

== Track listing ==
Credits adapted from the album's liner notes.

B.O.A.T.S. II: Me Time track listing
No.	Title	Writer(s)	Producer(s)	Length
1.	"Fork"	Tauheed Epps; Michael Williams II; Pierre Slaughter	Mike Will Made It; P-Nasty	3:47
2.	"36"	Epps; Tommy Brown	Brown	1:28
3.	"Feds Watching" (featuring Pharrell)	Epps; Pharrell Williams	Williams	4:10
4.	"Where U Been?" (featuring Cap.1)	Epps; Leon Smith; M. Williams II; Marquel Middlebrooks	Mike Will Made It; Marz	3:50
5.	"I Do It" (featuring Drake and Lil Wayne)	Epps; Aubrey Graham; Dwayne Carter; Dwayne Richardson; Thomas Pentz; Gabriel Arillo; Otis Redding	D. Rich; Wonder Arillo^{[a]}; Diplo^{[a]}	6:13
6.	"Used 2"	Epps; Byron Thomas	Mannie Fresh	3:45
7.	"Netflix" (featuring Fergie)	Epps; Stacy Ferguson; Jamal Jones; Carlton Mays, Jr.; Pentz; Derek Allen	Honorable C.N.O.T.E.; Diplo^{[a]}; DJA^{[b]}	3:55
8.	"Extra" (featuring Rich Homie Quan)	Epps; Dequantes Lamar; Gabriel Arillo	Wonder Arillo	4:47
9.	"U Da Realest"	Epps; Christopher Gholson	Drumma Boy	4:41
10.	"Beautiful Pain" (featuring Lloyd and Mase)	Epps; Lloyd Polite; Mason Betha; Mays, Jr.	Honorable C.N.O.T.E.	4:50
11.	"So We Can Live" (featuring T-Pain)	Epps; Faheem Najm; Montay Humphrey; William Jones; Erik Ortiz; Kevin Crowe; Kenny Bartolomei	DJ Montay (Part 1); Mr. Jonz^{[a]}; Wonder Arillo^{[b]}; J.U.S.T.I.C.E. League (Part 2)	6:46
12.	"Mainstream Ratchet"	Epps; Korey Roberson; Humphrey	Big Korey; DJ Montay^{[a]}	3:58
13.	"Black Unicorn" (featuring Chrisette Michele and Sunni Patterson)	Epps; Chrisette Michele Payne; Aldrin Davis	DJ Toomp	4:45
14.	"Outroduction"	Epps; Nicholas Warwar; Vinny Venditto; Vernon Bullock; Charles Ingersoll; Ronald Preyer; Robert Solomon	Streetrunner; Venditto^{[b]}	5:00

Deluxe edition (bonus tracks)
No.	Title	Writer(s)	Producer(s)	Length
15.	"Employee of the Month"	Epps; Elizabeth Abrams; Pentz; Trocon Roberts	Diplo; FKi^{[a]}	3:15
16.	"Live and Learn (It Will)" (featuring Dolla Boy and Pusha T)	Epps; Terrence Thornton; Earl Conyers; Tivon Key; Stephen Hacker	V Don	4:28
17.	"Living" (featuring Iamsu!)	Epps; Sudan Williams; Tony Storey, Jr.	League of Starz	3:08

International bonus track
No.	Title	Writer(s)	Producer(s)	Length
15.	"We Own It (Fast & Furious)" (with Wiz Khalifa)	Epps; Cameron Thomaz; Alex Schwartz; Joe Khajadourian; Breyan Isaac	The Futuristics	3:47

Notes

- ^{^[a]} signifies a co-producer
- ^{^[b]} signifies an additional producer
- "Fork" contains additional vocals by his mother Jeanette Epps
- "I Do It" contains the "#METIME" skit, produced by Sean C for Flight School Productions
- "Beautiful Pain" contains additional vocals by Wayne Blazed
- "Employee of the Month" contains additional vocals by Liz

Sample credits

- "Black Unicorn" contains a sample of "I Love My Family", written and performed by Heaven Epps.
- "Outroduction" contains a sample of "Stop What You’re Doing Girl", performed by The Younghearts, written by Vernon Bullock, Charles Ingersoll, Ronald Preyer and Robert Solomon.

== Charts ==
=== Weekly charts ===
Chart performance for B.O.A.T.S. II: Me Time
Chart (2013)	Peak position
Belgian Albums (Ultratop Wallonia)	153
Canadian Albums (Billboard)	11
UK R&B Albums (Official Charts)	10
US Billboard 200	3
US Top R&B/Hip-Hop Albums (Billboard)	2

=== Year-end charts ===
2013 chart performance for B.O.A.T.S. II: Me Time
Chart (2013)	Position
US Billboard 200	159
US Top R&B/Hip-Hop Albums (Billboard)	40

2014 chart performance for B.O.A.T.S. II: Me Time
Chart (2014)	Position
US Top R&B/Hip-Hop Albums (Billboard)	45

== Release history ==
Release formats for B.O.A.T.S. II: Me Time
Region	Date	Label	Format	Ref.
Australia	September 9, 2013	Def Jam	Digital download	
Belgium	September 9, 2013	Def Jam	Digital download	
France	September 9, 2013	Def Jam	Digital download	
Germany	September 9, 2013	Def Jam	Digital download	
Italy	September 9, 2013	Def Jam	Digital download	
Netherlands	September 9, 2013	Def Jam	Digital download	
New Zealand	September 9, 2013	Def Jam	Digital download	
Spain	September 9, 2013	Def Jam	Digital download	
United Kingdom	September 9, 2013	Virgin	CD; digital download	
United States	September 10, 2013	Def Jam	CD; digital download	
