= I Need a Hot Girl =

Single by Hot Boys

from the album Guerrilla Warfare
- Released: 1999
- Recorded: 1998
- Genre: Southern hip hop
- Length: 4:11
- Label: Cash Money, Universal
- Songwriters: Byron Thomas, Brian Williams, Christopher Dorsey, Virgil Tab, Jr, Dwayne Carter, Jr.
- Producer: Mannie Fresh

Hot Boys singles chronology
| "We On Fire" (1999) | "I Need a Hot Girl" (1999) |

"I Need a Hot Girl" is a song by New Orleans hip-hop group, the Hot Boys. The single was featured on their album Guerrilla Warfare. The song, as well as the entire album, was produced by Mannie Fresh. "I Need a Hot Girl" was written by Lil Wayne, B.G. and Turk. Juvenile did not appear on the track, but was featured in the video. The song was moderately successful, peaking at No. 65 on the Billboard Hot 100, the Hot Boys' only song there.

== Charts ==
=== Weekly charts ===
| Chart (1999–2000) | Peak position |
|---|---|
| US Billboard Hot 100 | 65 |
| US Hot R&B/Hip-Hop Songs (Billboard) | 23 |
| US Rhythmic Airplay (Billboard) | 26 |

=== Year-end charts ===
| Chart (2000) | Position |
|---|---|
| US Hot R&B/Hip-Hop Songs (Billboard) | 80 |
