= Ha (Juvenile song) =

Single by Juvenile

from the album 400 Degreez
- Released: October 17, 1998
- Recorded: 1998
- Genre: Hip hop; bounce
- Length: 4:52
- Label: Cash Money; Universal
- Songwriters: Juvenile; Mannie Fresh
- Producer: Mannie Fresh

Juvenile singles chronology
| "Solja Rag" (1997) | "Ha" (1998) | "Down Bottom" (1999) |

"Ha" is a 1998 song by rapper Juvenile, the lead single from his third album 400 Degreez. It was produced by Mannie Fresh. This song, along with Juvenile's "Back That Azz Up" and B.G.'s "Bling Bling", was responsible for taking Cash Money Records from a small local label in New Orleans to the pop mainstream. The song is notable for its unique style of rapping, with every line except the chorus ending with "ha". The chorus to the song includes a line taken from the earlier Juvenile single "Solja Rags".

== Music and lyrics ==
The primary topic of "Ha" is "street life in New Orleans", a subject that Juvenile presents through a series of rhetorical questions about "the highs and lows of hustling". The questions are addressed directly to the listener, at whom Juvenile alternately "laughs and sneers and, occasionally, commiserates". The song's confrontational nature has also led "Ha" to be described as a "vicious dressing down of a fake hustler".

Juvenile has attracted attention for his delivery on "Ha", which has been compared to talking rather than rapping. He has also been described as employing a "syrupy, sing-songy rhyme scheme" on the track. The song's production has been described as a "rattling, electronic taunt".

According to producer Mannie Fresh, "Ha" was the last song to have been added to 400 Degreez. He describes feeling that the album needed another song that would feel "raw" and off-the-cuff; in response, Juvenile suggested the lyrics to "Ha", which he had written previously but was unsure if listeners would appreciate. Once he heard the lyrics, Mannie composed the beat in "like 30 minutes", and the song was subsequently recorded in two takes.

== Music video ==
The music video was directed by Marc Klasfeld, in what Juvenile describes as Klasfeld's "first big video". It was shot in the Magnolia Projects over the course of three days. The video's contents include a series of vignettes that have been described as portraying "the raw simplicity and the unapologetic honesty" of life in the Magnolia Projects, interspersed with footage of Juvenile performing the song. Paul A. Thompson of Pitchfork lists several specific examples of scenes from the video:

The rest of Magnolia pops to life, either in eerily real tracking shots or in static frames that might as well be portraits. Kids jump on cast-off mattresses. Women in church clothes pose soberly—so do EMTs, with arms crossed in front of their ambulance. Magnolians get chased and cuffed and clutched by their fathers. There are roller skaters and pickup basketball games. A man on crutches hobbles down a street lit only by that ambulance’s siren lights; a boy feeds a piece of deli meat to a dog; money is counted and blurs until the bills are indistinguishable.

In a 2016 interview, Juvenile stated that the neighborhood's drug dealers all paused their business during the video shoot in order to avoid interfering with it.

== Remixes ==
"When Jay-Z called – "I wanna get on the remix to 'Ha'" – I knew I'd arrived. That was unheard of at the time. That catapulted Cash Money even further, when that song hit the airwaves, people were like, damn, Jay-Z is on that song and he's doing the 'Ha' thing."

— The song's producer Mannie Fresh on Jay-Z's guest appearance on the "Ha" remix.

Two remixes were recorded and also included on 400 Degreez. The first had a different beat and lyrics, and featured Juvenile's fellow Hot Boys members B.G., Lil Wayne, and Turk. The second had the same beat but different lyrics and featured a new verse from New York rapper Jay-Z. The second remix originated when Jay-Z, interested in "Ha", contacted Baby for a copy of the beat and recorded a verse without Juvenile's knowledge. The collaboration was particularly notable as East Coast rappers had previously shown minimal interest in Southern hip-hop; thus, Jay-Z's decision to remix "Ha" has come to be viewed by Billboard as "a key inflection point in the relationship between Southern and East Coast rap".

== Reception and legacy ==
"Ha" has come to be regarded as one of Juvenile's most significant songs. Rashad D. Grove of Revolt.tv describes the song as "a decisive introduction of Juvenile and Cash Money to the masses", further arguing that the song became "a classic street anthem" that placed Juvenile at the forefront of Southern hip-hop. Paul A. Thompson of Pitchfork calls it "one of the most singularly brilliant rap songs of the 1990s". A more contemporaneous review, by MtumeS of RapReviews, opines that the song "may be either a subtly nuanced work of genius or a beautiful accident. Or both." Robert Christgau, despite not being impressed with 400 Degreez overall, identified "Ha" as one of its highlights.

In contrast to Juvenile's performance, Thompson argued that Jay-Z "couldn't find the right bounce to really sell his verse" on the remix.

== Charts ==
"Ha" peaked at number 16 on the Billboard Hot R&B/Hip-Hop Singles & Tracks chart and number 68 on the Billboard Hot 100.

=== Weekly charts ===
| Chart (1998–1999) | Peak position |
|---|---|
| US Billboard Hot 100 | 68 |
| US Hot R&B/Hip-Hop Songs (Billboard) | 16 |
| US Hot Rap Songs (Billboard) | 11 |
| US Rhythmic Airplay (Billboard) | 30 |

=== Year-end charts ===
| Chart (1999) | Position |
|---|---|
| US Hot R&B/Hip-Hop Songs (Billboard) | 78 |
