= Used 2 =

Single by 2 Chainz

from the album B.O.A.T.S. II: Me Time
- Released: September 18, 2013
- Genre: Hip hop
- Length: 3:45
- Label: Def Jam
- Songwriters: Tauheed Epps; Byron Thomas
- Producer: Mannie Fresh

2 Chainz singles chronology
"Talk Dirty" (2013)	"Used 2" (2013)	"All Me" (2013)

"Used 2" is a song by American rapper 2 Chainz from his second studio album B.O.A.T.S. II: Me Time (2013). Produced and co-written by Mannie Fresh, it was released as the second single from the album on September 18, 2013.

== Background ==
The song was produced by former Cash Money Records in-house producer Mannie Fresh and features 2 Chainz paying homage to Juvenile's flow on his 1998 song "Back That Azz Up".

== Music video ==
The music video for "Used 2" was directed by Marc Klasfeld and filmed on September 26, 2013 in New Orleans, Louisiana. Released on October 13, 2013, the video features appearances from Mannie Fresh and, notably, three reunited members of New Orleans hip hop group Hot Boys—Juvenile, Turk and Lil Wayne. Hot Boys member B.G. is not featured in the video due to him serving his 11 year sentence at the time. In place, 2 Chainz holds up a red T-shirt reading "Free B.G." in the video.

== Release and live performances ==
2 Chainz announced the release of "Used 2" as the second single from B.O.A.T.S. II: Me Time on September 17, 2013. The following day, the single impacted mainstream urban radio in the United States. "Used 2" was serviced to urban contemporary radio in the United Kingdom on September 26, and it was subsequently added to the playlist of British urban radio station BBC Radio 1Xtra. 2 Chainz later performed "Used 2" with the track's producer Mannie Fresh at the 2013 BET Hip Hop Awards. Following its single release, "Used 2" debuted at numbers 11 and 44 respectively on the Billboard Bubbling Under Hot 100 Singles and Hot R&B/Hip-Hop Songs charts.

== Charts ==
Chart (2013)	Peak position
US Bubbling Under Hot 100 (Billboard)	11
US Hot R&B/Hip-Hop Songs (Billboard)	38

== Release history ==
Country	Date	Format	Label
United States	September 18, 2013	Mainstream urban radio	Def Jam Recordings
United Kingdom	September 26, 2013	Urban contemporary radio	Def Jam Recordings
United Kingdom	October 21, 2013	Contemporary hit radio	Def Jam Recordings
