= Netflix (disambiguation) =

Netflix is a streaming service founded in 1997.

Netflix may also refer to:

- Netflix, Inc., a media company that owns the streaming service
- Netflix Animation Studios, an animation studio and production company
- "Netflix" (song), 2013 song by 2 Chainz
- "Netflixxx", 2017 song by Brytiago and Bad Bunny
