= Baller Blockin' (soundtrack) =

Baller Blockin

Soundtrack album to Baller Blockin' by Cash Money Millionaires
- Released: September 12, 2000
- Recorded: 1999–2000
- Studios: Cash Money Studios; Circle House Studios
- Genre: Hip-hop
- Length: 1:15:03
- Labels: Cash Money; Universal
- Producers: Livin' Proof; Mannie Fresh; Massive; Pimp C; Stormy Dai; TQ

Cash Money Records soundtracks chronology
Baller Blockin (2000)	Undisputed (2002)

Singles from Baller Blockin
- 1. "Baller Blockin'" Released: 2000; 2. "Project Chick" Released: 2000

Professional ratings
Review scores
Source	Rating
AllMusic	2.5/5 stars

Baller Blockin is the soundtrack album to the 2000 American hood drama film Baller Blockin'. It was released on September 12, 2000, via Cash Money/Universal Records. Recording sessions took place at Cash Money Studios and Circle House Studios. Production was handled by Mannie Fresh, Stormy Day, Livin Proof, Massive, Pimp C and TQ, with Baby and Slim serving as executive producers.

The album features contributions from the Cash Money Millionaires members Big Tymers (Baby and Mannie Fresh) and Hot Boys (Juvenile, Turk, Lil' Wayne and B.G.), their Cash Money labelmates and affiliates Unplugged, Ziggler The Wiggler, Lac and Stone, as well as 8Ball & MJG, E-40, Nas and Bravehearts, Mack 10 and the Comrads, Rappin' 4-Tay, TQ and UGK.

In the United States, the album debuted at number 13 on the Billboard 200 and number 2 on the Top R&B/Hip-Hop Albums charts with first-week sales of over 80,000 copies. On December 19, 2000, it was certified Gold by the Recording Industry Association of America for selling over 500,000 copies in the US alone.

Music videos were shot for the singles "Baller Blockin'" and "Project Chick". The second single off of the album, "Project Chick", made it to number 47 on the Billboard Hot 100 and number 17 on the Hot R&B/Hip-Hop Songs charts.

== Track listing ==
No.	Title	Writer(s)	Producer(s)	Length
1.	"Intro"	Bryan Williams; Byron Thomas	Mannie Fresh	4:25
2.	"Baller Blockin'"	Williams; Tab Virgil; Terius Grey; Earl Stevens; Thomas	Mannie Fresh	4:40
3.	"Family Affair"	Chad Butler; Bernard Freeman	Pimp C	4:50
4.	"Rover Truck"	Grey; Thomas	Mannie Fresh	3:29
5.	"Skit"	Williams; Thomas	Mannie Fresh	0:52
6.	"Project Bitch"	Williams; Thomas; Dwayne Carter; Grey	Mannie Fresh	4:41
7.	"Ballin' G's"	Premro Smith; Marlon Goodwin		4:21
8.	"Thugged Out"	Christopher Dorsey; Thomas	Mannie Fresh	4:26
9.	"Don't Cry"	Solomon Boyd; Ralph Boykins; Edward Pack; Damon Miller; Terrell Burnside	Stormy Dai	4:37
10.	"What You Gonna Do"	Nasir Jones; Jabari Jones; Michael Epps; Eugene Gray	Mannie Fresh	4:55
11.	"Calling Me Killer"	Carter; Thomas	Mannie Fresh	4:21
12.	"I Got to Go"	Terrance Quaites; Franklin Crum	Livin Proof; TQ	3:32
13.	"Whatever"	Williams; Thomas	Mannie Fresh	4:45
14.	"Let Us Stunt"	Williams; Dorsey; Thomas	Mannie Fresh	3:48
15.	"Skit"	Williams; Thomas	Mannie Fresh	0:37
16.	"Milk and Honey"	Dedrick Rolison; Joseph Johnson; Jimmy Tucker		4:34
17.	"Uptown"	Virgil; Thomas	Mannie Fresh	4:08
18.	"I Don't Know"	Carter; Boyd; Boykins; Pack; Miller; Burnside	Stormy Dai	3:53
19.	"Win or Lose"	Anthony Forté	Massive	3:55
Total length:				1:15:03

== Personnel ==
- Byron "Mannie Fresh" Thomas – keyboards (tracks: 2, 4, 6, 8, 11, 13, 14, 17), producer (tracks: 1, 2, 4, 5, 6, 8, 11, 13, 14, 15, 17), mixing & engineering (tracks: 1, 2, 5, 6, 8, 11, 13, 14, 15, 17)
- Rick Marcel – lead bass (tracks: 2, 4, 6, 8, 11, 13, 14, 17)
- Terrence "Bearwolfe" Williams – keyboards assistant (tracks: 2, 4, 6, 8, 11, 13, 14, 17)
- Chad "Pimp C" Butler – producer (track 3)
- Damon "Stormy Dai" Miller – producer (tracks: 9, 18)
- Franklin "Livin Proof" Crum – producer (track 12)
- Terrence "TQ" Quaites – producer (track 12)
- Massive – producer (track 19)
- Ray Seay – mixing & engineering (tracks: 2, 4, 6, 8, 9, 11, 13, 14, 17, 18)
- Dino Delvaille – artwork
- Pen & Pixel Graphics – design
- Elaine Lee – artwork assistant
- Bryan "Baby"/"Birdman" Williams – executive producer
- Ronald "Slim" Williams – executive producer

== Charts ==
=== Weekly charts ===
Chart (2000)	Peak position
US Billboard 200	13
US Top R&B/Hip-Hop Albums (Billboard)	2

=== Year-end charts ===
Chart (2000)	Position
US Top R&B/Hip-Hop Albums (Billboard)	79

== Certifications ==
Region	Certification	Certified units/sales
United States (RIAA)	Gold	500,000^{^}
^{^} Shipments figures based on certification alone.
