= Get It How U Live! =

Get It How U Live!!

Studio album by Hot Boys
- Released: October 28, 1997
- Studio: Cash Money Studios
- Genres: Southern hip-hop; gangsta rap
- Length: 1:01:00
- Label: Cash Money
- Producer: Mannie Fresh

Hot Boys chronology
Get It How U Live!! (1997)	Guerrilla Warfare (1999)

Professional ratings
Review scores
Source	Rating
AllMusic	1.5/5 stars
The New Rolling Stone Album Guide	2/5 stars

Get It How U Live!! is the debut studio album by American hip-hop quartet the Hot Boys. It was released on October 28, 1997, via Cash Money Records. Recorded at Cash Money Studios, it was entirely produced by Mannie Fresh. It features guest appearances from Big Tymers and Bun B. The album peaked at number 37 on both the Top R&B/Hip-Hop Albums and the Heatseekers Albums charts in the United States.

Due to a distribution deal with Universal Records signed in March 1998, the album was reissued in 1999 a few weeks before the release of Guerrilla Warfare.

== Track listing ==
All tracks are written by Dwayne Carter, Terius Gray, Christopher Dorsey and Tab Virgil.

No.	Title	Length
1.	"Intro "Bigtimers""	2:46
2.	"We on Fire"	4:18
3.	"50 Shots Set's It Off"	5:02
4.	"On tha Porch (Part 1)"	1:01
5.	"Block Burner" (Lil Wayne)	4:44
6.	"Neighborhood Superstar" (featuring Big Tymers)	4:43
7.	"Take It Off Your Shoulder" (Juvenile)	4:01
8.	"Dirty World"	5:09
9.	"I'm a Hot Boy" (B.G.)	3:52
10.	"Get It How U Live!!"	4:14
11.	"On tha Porch (Part 2)"	1:23
12.	"I'm Com'n" (featuring Bun B)	5:20
13.	"Infrared Dot" (Turk)	4:15
14.	"Blood Thicker" (featuring Big Tymers)	4:21
15.	"Spit 'n Game"	5:51
Total length:		1:01:00

== Personnel ==
- Dwayne "Lil Wayne" Carter – songwriter, vocals
- Terius "Juvenile" Gray – songwriter, vocals
- Christopher "B.G." Dorsey – songwriter, vocals
- Tab "Turk" Virgil Jr. – songwriter, vocals
- Bryan "Baby" Williams – vocals (tracks: 6, 14), executive producer, booking
- Byron "Mannie Fresh" Thomas – vocals (tracks: 6, 14), guitar, keyboards, producer, mixing
- Bernard "Bun B" Freeman – vocals (track 12)
- Roger "Grey Hair" Slim – engineering
- Ronald "Slim" Williams – executive producer
- Pen & Pixel – artwork, design, layout

== Charts ==
Chart (1997)	Peak position
US Top R&B/Hip-Hop Albums (Billboard)	37
US Heatseekers Albums (Billboard)	37
