= We on Fire =

Single by Hot Boys

from the album Guerrilla Warfare
- Released: 1999
- Recorded: 1998
- Genre: Gangsta rap, Southern hip hop
- Length: 4:11
- Label: Cash Money, Universal
- Songwriters: Terius Gray, Christopher Dorsey, Lil Wayne, Tab Virgil, Jr.
- Producer: Mannie Fresh

Hot Boys singles chronology
"Neighborhood Superstar" (1997)	"We on Fire" (1999)	"I Need a Hot Girl" (1999)

"We on Fire" is the lead single from The Hot Boys' album Guerrilla Warfare. The songs are in the form of continued questions starting with "What kind of nigga..." (In the edited version, it's "What kind of boy..."). The original version, which appeared on Hot Boys' debut album, did not feature B.G. The Guerrilla Warfare version features B.G.

== Music Video ==
A music video was filmed for the Guerrilla Warfare version, and was directed by Dave Meyers. The music video shows the Cash Money Millionaires on the run from law enforcement after committing robbery. Big Tymers appear in the video as well.

== Reception ==
In a review of Guerilla Warfare, Rolling Stone said that "We on Fire" was an example of Hot Boys' "remarkable ability to make relentless repetition sound inventive".

== Charts ==
Chart (1999)	Peak position
U.S. Billboard Hot R&B/Hip-Hop Singles & Tracks	49
U.S. Billboard Hot Rap Singles	5
