= Where U Been? =

Where U Been? may refer to:

- Where U Been? (film), a 2010 stand up by Sinbad
- "Where U Been?" (song), a 2013 song by 2 Chainz
- Where You Been, a 1993 album by Dinosaur Jr.
