= Feds Watching =

Single by 2 Chainz featuring Pharrell

from the album B.O.A.T.S. II: Me Time
- Released: June 4, 2013
- Recorded: February 10, 2013
- Genre: Hip-hop
- Length: 4:10
- Label: Def Jam
- Songwriters: Tauheed Epps; Pharrell Williams
- Producer: Pharrell Williams

2 Chainz singles chronology
"Bubble Butt" (2013)	"Feds Watching" (2013)	"Trampoline" (2013)

Pharrell singles chronology
"Get Lucky" (2013)	"Feds Watching" (2013)	"Get Like Me" (2013)

Music video
- "Feds Watching" on YouTube

"Feds Watching" is a song by American rapper 2 Chainz featuring American musician Pharrell Williams. Produced by the latter, it released on June 4, 2013, as the lead single from the former's second studio album B.O.A.T.S. II: Me Time (2013). The song has since peaked at number 66 on the Billboard Hot 100.

== Background ==
On June 2, 2013, 2 Chainz premiered "Feds Watching" at the Hot 97's Summer Jam, the first single from his second studio album. The song features Pharrell Williams and was recorded on 2013 Grammy Awards night. The song was released to iTunes two days later, on June 4, 2013.

== Music video ==
The music video, released June 30, 2013 and was directed by Ryan Hope. A theme highly emphasized in the music video is that 2 Chainz featured many dark-skinned women as extras in the video.

Billboard gave the music video a positive review stating: "It should be illegal for this many attractive women to be in the same place at the same time. 'Feds Watching' serves a disproportional male to female ratio in an exotic, secluded bachelor pad.".

The Huffington Post also gave the video a positive review stating: "2 Chainz' 'Feds Watching' video follows the luxury rap music video formula with one notable twist. In the song, 2 Chainz raps about sporting Commes des Garcons and Alexander Wang clothing because 'if the Fed's watching,' he'd like to be 'fresh as hell.' (It turns out, of course, that they are watching.) The visuals for the song are appropriately lavish, with most of the action taking place in a Los Angeles mansion perched above the city."

== Critical reception ==
Rolling Stone ranked the song at 81 on their list of the 100 best songs of 2013. Pitchfork Media positioned it at number 69 on their list of the 100 best songs of 2013. It was ranked at number 23 on XXL's list of the 25 best songs of the year.

== Remixes ==
A remix was released on September 1, 2013, via Lil Wayne's mixtape, Dedication 5. The remix features verses from Lil Wayne and T.I. All three artists were on tour together at the time of the recording. Nelly also released a remix of the song.

== Track listing ==
Digital single

No.	Title	Writer(s)	Producer(s)	Length
1.	"Feds Watching" (featuring Pharrell)	Tauheed Epps, Pharrell Williams	Pharrell	4:10

== Charts ==
=== Weekly charts ===
Chart (2013)	Peak position
US Billboard Hot 100	66
US Hot R&B/Hip-Hop Songs (Billboard)	18
US Hot Rap Songs (Billboard)	12
US Rhythmic Airplay (Billboard)	18

=== Year-end charts ===
Chart (2013)	Position
US Hot R&B/Hip-Hop Songs (Billboard)	61

=== Certifications ===
Region	Certification	Certified units/sales
United States (RIAA)	Platinum	1,000,000^{‡}
^{‡} Sales+streaming figures based on certification alone.

== Release history ==
Country	Date	Format	Label	Ref.
United States	June 4, 2013	Digital download	Def Jam	
