= Let 'Em Burn =

Studio album by Hot Boys
- Released: March 25, 2003
- Genres: Gangsta rap; Southern hip hop
- Length: 60:00
- Labels: Cash Money; Universal
- Producers: Mannie Fresh; Bryan "Baby" Williams; Ronald "Slim" Williams

Hot Boys chronology
Guerrilla Warfare (1999)	Let 'Em Burn (2003)

Professional ratings
Review scores
Source	Rating
AllMusic	2/5 stars
Chicago Tribune	(Positive)
RapReviews	7.5/10
The Source	3.5/5 stars

Let 'Em Burn is the third studio album by New Orleans rap group the Hot Boys, released March 25, 2003, on Cash Money Records. The album was originally recorded from 1998 to 2000, but was not released until three years later when Juvenile, B.G. and Turk left Cash Money Records. All the production on the album is done by former Cash Money Records producer Mannie Fresh. Let 'Em Burn debuted at number 14 on the Billboard 200, selling 64,000 copies in its first week.

== Track listing ==
All tracks produced by Mannie Fresh.

No.	Title	Writer(s)	Length
1.	"Alicia Applefoot" (Intro)	Byron Thomas	0:24
2.	"Introduction" (feat. Big Tymers)	Dwayne Carter; Terius Gray; Christopher Dorsey; Tab Virgil; Bryan Williams; Thomas	3:17
3.	"My Section"	Carter; Gray; Dorsey; Virgil	4:09
4.	"Stick & Move" (feat. Big Tymers & Lac)	B. Williams; Carter; Gray; Dorsey; Virgil; Thomas	5:26
5.	"Down Here"	Carter; Gray; Dorsey; Virgil; Thomas	4:16
6.	"Spin Tha Bend"	Carter; Gray; Dorsey; Virgil; Thomas	4:13
7.	"My Cousin's New Keyboard" (skit) (feat. Mannie Fresh)	Terrence Williams; Thomas	1:13
8.	"Let 'Em Burn"	Carter; Gray; Dorsey; Virgil; Thomas	4:56
9.	"Do Whatcha Do" (feat. Big Tymers)	B. Williams; Dorsey; Virgil; Thomas	3:35
10.	"Gangsta Nigga" (feat. TQ)	Carter; Gray; Dorsey; Virgil; Terrance Quaites; Thomas	4:55
11.	"These Hoes" (feat. Mannie Fresh & TQ)	T. Williams; Thomas	2:28
12.	"3 Strikes"	Carter; Gray; Dorsey; Virgil; Thomas	4:35
13.	"Jack Who, Take What"	Carter; Gray; Dorsey; Virgil; Thomas	4:54
14.	"Young Riders"	Carter; Gray; Dorsey; Virgil; B. Williams; Thomas	3:44
15.	"Off Wit' Ya Head" (B.G. solo)	Dorsey; Thomas	3:15
16.	"Up In Tha Hood" (feat. Lac)	Carter; Gray; Dorsey; Virgil; Thomas	5:17
17.	"Outro"	K. Moore; Thomas	1:10

== Personnel ==
- Barewolf – keyboards (2–6, 8–16)
- Leslie Brathwaite – mixing (1–6, 8–10, 12–16)
- Ryan Enstrom – engineer (4, 10, 13)
- Steve Fisher – engineer (3), assistant engineer (16), assistant mix engineer (1–6, 8–16)
- Erik Flettrich – engineer (6, 15)
- Mannie Fresh – producer, keyboards (2–6, 8–16)
- Mark "Exit" Goodchild – engineer (2–4, 6, 7, 9, 13, 16, 17), mixing (7, 11, 17)
- Charles Pettaway – guitar (6, 11, 13), bass (6)
- Kai Schoorman – engineer (2, 12)
- Deshaun Washington – engineer (9)
- Bryan Williams – executive producer
- Cory Williams – engineer (1, 11, 15), assistant engineer (3, 4, 6, 9, 13)
- Ronald Williams – executive producer

== Charts ==
Chart (2003)	Peak position
US Billboard 200	14
US Top R&B/Hip Hop Albums	3
