= Young & Thuggin' =

Studio album by Turk
- Released: June 5, 2001
- Recorded: 2000–2001
- Genres: Gangsta rap; Southern hip-hop
- Length: 74:32
- Labels: Cash Money; Universal
- Producers: Mannie Fresh; Bryan "Baby" Williams (exec.); Ronald "Slim" Williams (exec.)

Turk chronology
Young & Thuggin' (2001)	Raw & Uncut (2003)

Singles from Young & Thuggin'
- 1. "It's In Me" Released: April 17, 2001; 2. "Freak Da Girls" Released: 2001

Professional ratings
Review scores
Source	Rating
AllMusic	3.5/5 stars

Young & Thuggin is the debut studio album by American rapper Turk, released on June 5, 2001 through Cash Money Records, and produced entirely by Mannie Fresh. The album was a success on the charts, selling 82,000 copies in its first week, peaking at #9 on the Billboard 200 and #2 on the Top R&B/Hip-Hop Albums. Among the guests featured on the album were his fellow Hot Boys, the Big Tymers and Mack 10.

== Track listing ==
1. "Intro"- 1:52 (feat. Mannie Fresh)
2. "Bout to Go Down"- 4:45 (feat. Baby & Christina)
3. "It's in Me"- 4:14
4. "Yes We Do"- 5:22 (feat. B.G., Lil Wayne, Lac & Mack 10)
5. "At the Same Time"- 4:20
6. "Growing Up"- 4:14 (feat. Mickey & Christina)
7. "Hatin' (Skit)"- 1:08 (feat. Mannie Fresh)
8. "Untamed Guerrilla"- 4:03
9. "Public Service Announcement"- 1:30 (feat. Mannie Fresh)
10. "One Saturday Night"- 5:14 (feat. Lil Derrick & Mannie Fresh)
11. "What Would You Do?"- 4:23
12. "Project"- 4:14 (feat. Hakeem)
13. "Seattle Slew (Skit)"- 1:22 (feat. Mac Minister)
14. "Freak da Hoes"- 4:51 (feat. Mannie Fresh)
15. "Police (Skit)"- :22 (feat. Mac Minister)
16. "Soldierette"- 4:18 (feat. Stone)
17. "All Night"- 3:36 (feat. Lil Wayne)
18. "Finna Records"- 2:08 (feat. Mannie Fresh)
19. "Wanna Be Down"- 4:07 (feat. Baby, Hakeem, & Lac)
20. "Trife Livin'"- 4:12
21. "Hallways & Cuts"- 4:07 (feat. Mickey & B.G.)

== Charts ==
=== Weekly charts ===
Chart (2001)	Peak position
US Billboard 200	9
US Top R&B/Hip-Hop Albums (Billboard)	2

=== Year-end charts ===
Chart (2001)	Position
US Top R&B/Hip-Hop Albums (Billboard)	93
