= Solja Rags =

Studio album by Juvenile
- Released: May 13, 1997
- Recorded: 1996–1997
- Genres: Gangsta rap, Southern hip hop
- Length: 57:41
- Label: Cash Money
- Producers: Mannie Fresh, Bryan "Baby" Williams (exec.), Ronald "Slim" Williams (exec.)

Juvenile chronology
Being Myself (1995)	Solja Rags (1997)	400 Degreez (1998)

Professional ratings
Review scores
Source	Rating
AllMusic	2/5 stars
The Rolling Stone Album Guide	2.5/5 stars

Solja Rags is the second studio album by American rapper Juvenile. The album was released May 13, 1997, as the first release under Cash Money Records. This was also Juvenile's first album signed as an artist on Cash Money Records. The album sold over 200,000 copies independently.

== Track listing ==
- All songs produced by Mannie Fresh.

No.	Title	Length
1.	"Ziggly Wiggly" (featuring Ziggly Wiggly and Bulletproof)	2:12
2.	"Solja Rag"	4:08
3.	"I Did That" (featuring Turk, Big Moe, and B.G.)	4:35
4.	"Roll With 'Em" (featuring Mannie Fresh)	5:09
5.	"Pimpinabitch"	2:02
6.	"Livin' in Tha Project"	2:08
7.	"Who's Tha M.F."	5:09
8.	"Hide Out or Ride Out" (featuring Turk and Lil Wayne)	4:39
9.	"Spittin' Game" (featuring Hot Boys and Bulletproof)	5:51
10.	"3rd Ward Solja" (featuring Mannie Fresh and Magnolia Shorty)	4:27
11.	"Welcome 2 Tha Section" (featuring Mannie Fresh, B.G., and Bulletproof)	4:22
12.	"Money on the Couch"	4:25
13.	"That's How It Be Happenin'"	4:14
14.	"Solja Rag (Radio)"	4:10

== Charts ==
Chart (1997)	Peak position
US Top R&B/Hip-Hop Albums (Billboard)	55
