= 400 Degreez =

1998 studio album by Juvenile

Studio album by Juvenile
- Released: November 3, 1998
- Studios: Cash Money Studios, Metairie, Louisiana, U.S.
- Genres: Southern hip-hop; bounce; gangsta rap
- Length: 72:29
- Labels: Cash Money; Universal
- Producer: Mannie Fresh

Juvenile chronology
Solja Rags (1997)	400 Degreez (1998)	Tha G-Code (1999)

Singles from 400 Degreez
- 1. "Ha" Released: October 17, 1998; 2. "Back That Azz Up" Released: June 11, 1999; 3. "Follow Me Now" Released: 1999

400 Degreez is the third studio album by American rapper Juvenile. The album was released on November 3, 1998, by Universal Records and Bryan "Baby" Williams' Cash Money Records. It was solely produced by Cash Money's in-house producer, Mannie Fresh.

400 Degreez is a hip-hop album that also takes influence from the bounce music scene of New Orleans, the home city of both Juvenile and Cash Money. It discusses life in New Orleans' Magnolia Projects in both humorous and dark ways at different points. The album is well known for its successful singles, "Ha" and "Back That Azz Up", which peaked at numbers 68 and 19 respectively on the Billboard Hot 100. 400 Degreez itself was also a commercial success, peaking at number nine on the Billboard 200 and number two on Billboard's Top R&B/Hip-Hop Albums. It additionally peaked atop the latter chart for its Year-End list of 1999 and won the Billboard Music Award for Top R&B Album the same year. According to Cash Money's founder, Birdman, the album sold 30,000 copies in its first week.

The album received quadruple platinum certification by the Recording Industry Association of America (RIAA) on December 19, 2000, and it has become Juvenile's best-selling solo album. 400 Degreez has also been acclaimed as a highly influential album upon Southern hip-hop, both for inspiring later Southern hip-hop artists and for introducing distinctively Southern styles to the hip-hop mainstream. It has been recognized among the best albums of its kind by outlets such as Pitchfork, Rolling Stone, Billboard, Consequence, and The Ringer.

== Background and recording ==
Juvenile released Solja Rags, his second overall album and first on Cash Money Records, in 1997. Based on the regional success of Solja Rags, as well as of other Cash Money projects, the label attracted the attention of Universal Records. Universal subsequently signed a manufacturing and distribution deal with Cash Money, in which Cash Money retained full ownership of the rights to the music and received 85% of the royalties; according to author Keith Spera, "Universal would essentially be paid a commission to make, move and market Cash Money CDs." 400 Degreez was the first album that Cash Money Records released through this arrangement.

Juvenile has described the recording process of 400 Degreez as "like ... a job", explaining that all of Cash Money's artists would go to the studio daily and record music for whichever artist's album was scheduled next. Mannie Fresh, the album's sole producer, recounts that the songs would originate with their lyrics and that he would subsequently compose beats that would match their rhythm; he also notes that, because of this recording structure, many of the songs on 400 Degreez include verses with irregular durations. In contrast to other Cash Money rappers, Juvenile wrote his own hooks on 400 Degreez.

A deluxe version of 400 Degreez was released on March 29, 2024, to commemorate the 25th anniversary of the album. It adds two bonus tracks, "Party" and "We Be Blowing Money".

== Content ==
Juvenile's primary topic on 400 Degreez is life in New Orleans, a subject that he approaches from both lighthearted and serious angles at different points on the album. The tonal blend has led the album to be described as balancing "humor and street smarts", as being "as fun as it is bleak", and as having an overarching "swaggering but paranoid" mood. Rashad D. Grove of Revolt.tv portrays the majority of the album as "full of gritty, grim street tales about murder, hustling, paranoia, [and] loyalty", but also acknowledges that Juvenile "finds a way to enjoy the fruits of his labor" on some tracks. MtumeS of RapReviews appraises the album's principal subjects as "wine, women, [and] weapons", and opines that its goal is to be pure entertainment rather than "trying to stimulate, provoke, or educate". Pitchfork's Paul A. Thompson argues for the more lighthearted elements of 400 Degreez as being most central to the album's sound: he argues that "Juve's songwriting is, at its resting state, playful, buoyant, full of asides and knowing advice", and that it shifts into darker moods for only "brief spurts".

Juvenile's performance attracted attention not just for its content but its delivery, which has been described as "comfortably bridg[ing] the gap between Mannie's bounce beats and more straightforward rap styles". He has been described as deploying "melodic lyrics" and a "signature sing-songy flow" on the album, and as having an "elastic" voice. Juvenile was also identified as making heavy use of New Orleans' accent and local slang. Critic Kelefa Sanneh commented that Juvenile "didn't seem particularly worried about making himself understood" and prioritized showing off local styles rather than pursuing wider appeal. Similarly, MtumeS of RapReviews characterized him as speaking in a "lazy-tongued drawl" and using vocabulary with "no written equivalent or precise meaning".

The production of 400 Degreez was handled fully by Mannie Fresh and features heavy influence from New Orleans' local bounce music scene. Dean Van Nguyen of Crack describes "tightly packed soundscapes" of "bounce orchestration" throughout the project. The album makes particularly extensive use of keyboards, with MtumeS describing the instrument as "punctuat[ing] every song"; Sanneh highlighted this focus on keyboards as a trait that was particularly indebted to bounce. Critics also noted that Mannie abstained from using samples in an era when they were widespread in hip-hop. Instead, the album's beats incorporated a number of live instruments. In addition to the keyboards, the usage of bass was highlighted often; individual critics have also identified guitars, horn sections, Hammond organ, and drum machines as contributors to the album's sound. Other figures involved in 400 Degreez include the Hot Boys—Juvenile, Lil Wayne, B.G., and Turk—whose numerous guest appearances were remarked upon by several critics.

The "gloriously brash and tasteless" cover art for 400 Degreez was designed by Houston firm Pen & Pixel. Thompson describes it as portraying Juvenile "propped up among the flames like Frankenstein's monster", surrounded by "models pacing through a library". In an interview with Noisey, Juvenile explained that he wanted the cover to be crowded with disparate elements in order to reflect the breadth of topics that he discussed on the album.

=== Songs ===
The tracks from 400 Degreez that attracted the greatest critical attention were its first two singles, "Ha" and "Back That Azz Up". The two songs have been described collectively as "anthemic" and "earthshaking". Although "Ha" was the album's lead single, Mannie Fresh recalled in 2014 that it was the last song to be written for it. Its lyrics describe "the highs and lows of hustling" with a series of anecdotes that are by turns "funny", "cruel", and "criminal". Juvenile's delivery on "Ha" has been characterized as a "syrupy, sing-songy rhyme scheme", but also as closer to talking than rapping. 400 Degreez also includes a remix to "Ha" that features Jay-Z, a collaboration that has been described as "a key inflection point in the relationship between Southern and East Coast rap". Since New York rappers had previously paid little attention to Southern hip-hop, Mannie Fresh recalls that learning that Jay-Z was interested in appearing on "Ha" was when he "knew [he'd] arrived".

"Back That Azz Up"—also known by the censored title "Back That Thang Up"—originated as a song that Juvenile would perform live over the beat to Eric B. & Rakim's "Paid in Full". The final beat for "Back That Azz Up" has been described as a "bounce-rooted contemporary Negro spiritual" whose primary sonic elements are "string stabs and swells and clean bass hits". Mannie Fresh has stated that, by incorporating both 808 drums and classical-inspired strings into the beat, he sought to make the song appeal to a wide range of demographics. By contrast, Juvenile recalls that he had been skeptical of the beat when he first heard it. After its release, "Back That Azz Up" proved wildly successful and has come to be regarded as Juvenile's "defining hit". The song has also been praised as "the maximalist endpoint of [the] bounce–rap fusion" and as "one of the most iconic" dirty rap songs.

Other tracks from 400 Degreez include "Flossin' Season", a posse cut built on a bossa nova–inspired beat. Thompson describes it as "the best group song" on the album, characterizing it as "anxious, defiant, [and] unbelievably goofy", and other critics have described the lyrics of "Flossin' Season" as including "incredibly brash boasts" as well as "charm and bravado". The song "Ghetto Children" features "cautionary tales" told in a "young-but-old growl", over a beat characterized by slap bass and guitar elements. In "Run for It", featured rapper Lil Wayne portrays himself as eager to fight his rivals, whereas Juvenile remarks that "he'd rather see the violence on TV" than be personally involved. The album's title track employs a beat that has been compared to James Bond music, over which Juvenile "ponder[s] the importance of reputation".

== Music videos ==
The singles "Ha" and "Back That Azz Up" both received music videos. The "Ha" video was directed by Marc Klasfeld and has been described as capturing "the raw simplicity and the unapologetic honesty of street life in New Orleans"; it intersperses footage of Juvenile performing with a number of vignettes of everyday life in the Magnolia Projects. The music video was shot over the course of three days. Juvenile recounts that the area's drug dealers paused their activities for the duration of the shoot in order to avoid interfering with it.

The "Back That Azz Up" video has become renowned for its introduction, which first depicts two violin-playing men in a foggy scene before cutting to Juvenile, who declares that "Cash Money Records [is] taking over for the nine-nine and the two-thousand". Rashad D. Grove of Revolt.tv recalls that the statement seemed at the time to be fueled by "blind ambition and artistic naiveté", but argues that Juvenile's prediction was ultimately vindicated by the song's success; retrospective reviews have noted that the "Back That Azz Up" video quickly became a staple on MTV and BET.

On March 26, 2024, Juvenile and Mannie Fresh released a music video for the title track, "400 Degreez", to commemorate the album's 25th anniversary the preceding year. The video was directed by Diesel Filmz and juxtaposes "throwback footage" against "contemporary scenes of Juvenile and Mannie Fresh performing together as southern hip-hop moguls".

== Reception and legacy ==
Professional ratings
Review scores
Source	Rating
AllMusic	4/5 stars
Pitchfork	9.4/10
RapReviews	7/10
Rolling Stone	3.5/5 stars
The Source	4/5 stars
The Village Voice	(choice cut)

Upon its initial release, 400 Degreez attained a modestly positive reception. Journalist and author Keith Spera recalled in 2011 that the album "earned praise from not only the rap press, but mainstream rock publications". Elliott Wilson of Rolling Stone praised the album's "roaming bass lines, catchy keyboard riffs and rattling drum-machine kicks"; he identified the rags-to-riches storytelling on songs such as "Gone Ride With Me" and "Ghetto Children" as highlights, but also found there to be "lackluster moments" elsewhere in the tracklist. MtumeS of RapReviews was critical of the simplicity of Juvenile's rhyme schemes and subject matter, but nevertheless regarded 400 Degreez as stylish enough to remain interesting. Robert Christgau awarded the album a "Choice Cut" rating, indicating that he liked certain songs on it (particularly "Ha") but was overall unimpressed.

Over time, as the album's influence has become more visible, it has achieved a greater level of critical acclaim. Paul A. Thompson, reviewing 400 Degreez for Pitchfork in 2018, described the album as a "masterpiece" that was "one of the most consequential rap records of its era and the next". Jason Birchmeier of AllMusic named 400 Degreez as "the album that forced everyone to suddenly take [Cash Money] very seriously", and—while he regarded the project as containing some filler—he nevertheless found that "Juvenile's structured rhyming" and "Mannie Fresh's seemingly bottomless well of hot beats" made even the perceived filler deserving of attention. Revolt.tv's Rashad D. Grove shared Birchmeier's opinion about the presence of filler, but also agreed that the "larger-than-life personalities" of the performers prevented it from becoming wearisome; Grove additionally praised 400 Degreez for the "uniqueness and ... authenticity" of Juvenile's delivery, as well as for the distinctive combination of influences in the instrumentation, which he described as "genius". Dean Van Nguyen of Crack was another critic to have lauded the album, praising Juvenile as "an impossibly fantastic rapper" whose rhymes could "be dense and complex [or] forceful with finesse".

Critics have also credited the success of 400 Degreez with driving the growth of both Cash Money and of the wider genre of Southern hip-hop. Kairi Coe of XXL dubbed it "one of the main projects responsible for boosting the Cash Money label to superstardom and bringing women to the dance floor for nearly two decades". Grove argued that the album served as "evidence of the growing influence of Southern rap music" and established New Orleans' particular regional sound as "the newest expression of hip-hop". Thompson credited 400 Degreez with "help[ing] Southern rap pierce the mainstream", and argued that it forms "part of the DNA for much of modern hip-hop". The impact of 400 Degreez has also been regarded as having paved the way for future Cash Money and Young Money stars such as Drake and Nicki Minaj, as well as for Southern rappers such as T.I. and Young Jeezy.

=== Accolades ===
400 Degreez has appeared on several lists of the best hip-hop and rap albums. Pitchfork's 2025 list of the 100 Best Rap Albums of All Time ranked it in third place, describing the project as "a watershed moment for Southern rap music" on which Juvenile was "an unrelenting powerhouse". Meanwhile, Billboard's list of the 100 Greatest Rap Albums of All Time was released in 2024 and ranked 400 Degreez in 44th place, regarding it as "an undeniable classic" that showcased "the best of what can happen when a regional sound hits the national stage". Consequence ranked the album as the 38th-best hip-hop album of all time in 2023, while Rolling Stone Australia ranked it 68th on a similar list in 2022.

In its 2020 list of the 500 Greatest Albums of All Time, Rolling Stone ranked 400 Degreez at 470th place, arguing that the album "reorientated hip-hop toward a new Southern sound" and "added new sonic textures that pop music is still mining". Other best-of lists to have highlighted 400 Degreez include The Ringer's 2017 list of the best Southern hip-hop albums of all time, on which it placed third, as well as HipHopDX's unranked list of the best hip-hop and R&B albums of 1998.

== Track listing ==
All songs produced by Mannie Fresh. Songwriting credits adapted from Apple Music.

No.	Title	Writer(s)	Length
1.	"Intro (400 Degreez)"	Byron Thomas	2:12
2.	"Ha"	Terius Gray	4:52
3.	"Gone Ride with Me"	Gray	4:23
4.	"Flossin' Season" (featuring Big Tymers, B.G., and Lil Wayne)	Gray; Thomas; Christopher Dorsey	4:33
5.	"Ghetto Children"	Gray	4:05
6.	"Follow Me Now"	Gray; Tito Puente	3:55
7.	"Cash Money Concert (skit)"	Thomas	0:51
8.	"Welcome 2 tha Nolia" (featuring Turk)	Gray; Tab Virgil	5:51
9.	"U.P.T." (featuring Hot Boys and Baby)	Gray; Thomas; Dorsey; Bryan Williams; Dwayne Carter	4:17
10.	"Run for It" (featuring Lil Wayne)	Gray; Carter	4:45
11.	"Ha (Hot Boys Remix)" (featuring Hot Boys)	Gray	4:25
12.	"Rich Niggaz" (featuring Lil Wayne, Turk, and Papa Reu)	Gray; Virgil; Carter; Reuben Nero	5:03
13.	"Back That Azz Up" (featuring Mannie Fresh and Lil Wayne)	Gray; Thomas	4:25
14.	"Off Top" (featuring Big Tymers)	Gray	3:50
15.	"After Cash Money Concert (skit)"	Gray; Dorsey	1:19
16.	"400 Degreez"	Gray; Thomas	4:15
17.	"Juvenile on Fire"	Gray	4:57
18.	"Ha (Remix)" (featuring Jay-Z)	Gray	4:25

== Personnel ==
Credits adapted from Apple Music.

- Ronald Williams – Executive producer
- Bryan Williams – Executive producer
- Juvenile – Performer
- Big Tymers – Performer
- Lil Wayne – Performer
- Mannie Fresh – Producer, engineer, mixing
- Turk – Performer
- B.G. – Performer
- Papa Reu – Performer (track 12)
- Jay-Z – Performer (track 18)
- Barewolf – Keyboards (tracks 6, 8, 12)
- Corey Funky Fingers – Guitar, bass (tracks 6, 12)
- Pen & Pixel – Cover art

=== Credited samples ===
- Maxwell (track 4)
- Tito Puente (track 6)
- Brass Construction (track 13)
- UGK (track 13)

== Charts ==
=== Weekly charts ===
Chart (1998–1999)	Peak position
US Billboard 200	9
US Top R&B/Hip-Hop Albums (Billboard)	2

=== Year-end charts ===
Chart (1999)	Position
US Billboard 200	18
US Top R&B/Hip-Hop Albums (Billboard)	1

Chart (2000)	Position
US Billboard 200	50
US Top R&B/Hip-Hop Albums (Billboard)	39

== Certifications ==
Region	Certification	Certified units/sales
United States (RIAA)	4× Platinum	4,000,000^{^}
^{^} Shipments figures based on certification alone.

== See also ==
- Billboard Year-End
