= Where U Been? (song) =

Promotional single by 2 Chainz featuring Cap.1

from the album B.O.A.T.S. II: Me Time
- Released: August 1, 2013
- Recorded: 2013
- Genre: Hip hop
- Length: 3:50
- Label: Def Jam Recordings
- Songwriters: Tauheed Epps, L. Smith, M. Williams, Marquel Middlebrooks
- Producers: Mike Will Made It, Marz

"Where U Been?" is a song by American rapper 2 Chainz from his second studio album B.O.A.T.S. II: Me Time. (2013) The song was released as the album's first promotional single on August 1, 2013. It was produced by frequent collaborator Mike Will Made It, and featured a guest appearance by Cap.1. The song peaked on the US Billboard Bubbling Under R&B/Hip-Hop Singles at number one.

It samples from "The Dance of the Witches", part of the score of The Witches of Eastwick, written by John Williams.

== Background ==
On August 1, 2013, 2 Chainz premiered the Mike Will Made It-produced "Where U Been?" featuring Cap.1, from his second studio album B.O.A.T.S. II: Me Time. On the same day, it was serviced to DJs as the album's first promotional single. In September 2013, 2 Chainz performed "Where U Been?" on DJ Skee's SKEE Live along with "Netflix".

== Music video ==
The Sharod Marcus Simpson-directed music video for "Where U Been?" was released on September 11, 2013, the day after the album's US release. The video features a compilation of tour footage from the America's Most Wanted concert tour, which also featured T.I. and Lil Wayne. The black and white video also shows 2 Chainz "performing to packed crowds and celebrating his lavish lifestyle."

== Critical reception ==
"Where U Been?" was met with generally positive reviews from music critics, with most of the praise going towards the production. Jordan Sargent of Spin praised Mike Will Made It's production saying, it "weds pinging bells and the hint of a guitar riff to the producer's typically intricate hi-hat programming." Kyle Krammer of Pitchfork Media credited the song for its "Massive, booming beat and brillent non sequitur punchlines." David Jeffries of AllMusic called the song a "heartbreak 2 Chainz and Mike Will Made-It style with betrayal lyrics going ghetto over hypnotic, pounding production." Julian Benbow of The Boston Globe also praised the production, calling it warped and taunting. Jay Soul of RapReviews called the song pleasant to the ear.

== Chart performance ==
Chart (2013)	Peak position
US Bubbling Under R&B/Hip-Hop Singles (Billboard)	1
