= Undisputed (soundtrack) =

Soundtrack album by various artists
- Released: August 20, 2002
- Genre: Hip hop
- Label: Cash Money, Universal
- Producer: Stanley Clarke, Mannie Fresh, Hangmen 3, Jazze Pha, Erick Sermon, Carl Thomas,

Undisputed is the soundtrack to the 2002 film of the same name. It was released on August 20, 2002, through Cash Money and featured mostly Southern rap. The album made it to number 101 on the Billboard 200, number 41 on the Top R&B/Hip-Hop Albums and number 6 on the Top Soundtracks.

== Track listing ==
1. "Undisputed" - 3:48 (Cash Money Millionaires) (produced by Mannie Fresh)
2. "We Drop It" - 3:59 (Big Tymers, Lac & Stone) (produced by Mannie Fresh)
3. "Let Me Ride" - 3:50 (Trick Daddy & Rick Ross) (produced by Cool & Dre)
4. "Real Talk" - 3:46 (Lil Wayne) (produced by Mannie Fresh)
5. "How Did I" - 4:23 (Carl Thomas) (produced by Carl Thomas & Vato)
6. "Hungry" - 4:05 (Bubba Sparxxx) (produced by Duddy Ken)
7. "Everyday" - 3:43 (Mikkey) (produced by Mannie Fresh)
8. "Shorty Down" - 3:35 (Teena Marie) (produced by Teena Marie & Pamela Williams)
9. "So Gangsta" - 4:05 (Gillie Da Kid & Major Figgas) (produced by Mannie Fresh)
10. "Ride Together" - 3:27 (Boo & Gotti & Baby) (produced by Mannie Fresh)
11. "I Walk It" - 3:56 (Baby, Stone, Gillie Da Kid & Lac) (produced by Mannie Fresh)
12. "Think About You (Looking Through the Window)" - 4:18 (TQ) (produced by TQ)
13. "If You Don't Know by Now" - 2:51 (Erick Sermon) (produced by Erick Sermon)
14. "Que la Cosa" - 3:33 (Petey Pablo) (produced by Punch)
15. "Go Hard" - 3:59 (Benzino) (produced by Hangmen 3)
16. "Daddy's Little Girl" - 4:11 (Christina) (produced by Mannie Fresh)
17. "Bout My Paper" - 3:58 (Baby, Kandi, Duke & Big Gee) (produced by Jazze Pha)
18. "Time Has Come Today" - 3:24 (T-Players) (produced by Stanley Clarke)
19. "In Here" - 3:36 (B.E.C.) (produced by Stanley Clarke)
20. "If U Wanna Know" - 3:36 (B.E.C. & Universal) (produced by Stanley Clarke)
21. "Man Up" - 3:31 (Result) (produced by Stanley Clarke)
