= Guerrilla Warfare (album) =

Studio album by Hot Boys
- Released: July 27, 1999
- Studios: Circle House Studios, Miami, Florida
- Genres: Gangsta rap; Southern hip hop
- Length: 70:11
- Labels: Universal; Cash Money
- Producers: Mannie Fresh; Bryan "Baby" Williams (exec.); Ronald "Slim" Williams (exec.)

Hot Boys chronology
Get It How U Live! (1997)	Guerrilla Warfare (1999)	Let 'Em Burn (2003)

Singles from Guerrilla Warfare
- 1. "We On Fire" Released: June 10, 1999; 2. "I Need a Hot Girl" Released: September 20, 1999

Professional ratings
Review scores
Source	Rating
AllMusic	4/5 stars
Rolling Stone	3/5 stars
The Source	4.5/5 stars
USA Today	3.5/4 stars
The Village Voice	(dud)

Guerrilla Warfare is the commercial debut and second studio album by the New Orleans hip-hop group Hot Boys, released on July 27, 1999, via Universal Records and Baby's Cash Money Records. It was an instant hit, debuting at #5 on the Billboard 200 and #1 on the Top R&B/Hip Hop Albums selling 142,000 copies in its first week, and remains their most successful album as a group.

Produced by Mannie Fresh, Guerrilla Warfare contains the lead single, "We On Fire", which was placed at #49 on the Billboard's Hot R&B/Hip-Hop Singles. Other charting tracks include "I Need A Hot Girl" which also peaked at #65 on the Billboard Hot 100.

The album was recorded in one week's time at the Circle House recording studio in Miami, according to group member Turk. However, in the album's liner notes, the album was recorded at Cash Money Studios.

== Commercial performance ==
Guerrilla Warfare was certified Platinum by RIAA on November 1, 1999. The album has sold over 1,500,000 copies since its release.

== Track listing ==
Guerrilla Warfare
No.	Title	Length
1.	"Intro (Hot & Spicy)" (featuring Mannie Fresh)	2:01
2.	"We on Fire"	4:11
3.	"Respect My Mind"	4:43
4.	"Help" (B.G.)	5:18
5.	"Ridin’"	4:59
6.	"Off Tha Porch" (Skit)	1:18
7.	"Get Out Tha Way"	5:07
8.	"Clear Tha Set" (Lil Wayne)	3:55
9.	"I Feel"	4:20
10.	"Boys At War"	5:36
11.	"You Dig" (Juvenile)	3:57
12.	"I Need a Hot Girl" (feat. Big Tymers)	4:52
13.	"Tuesdays & Thursdays"	4:17
14.	"Bout Whatever" (Young Turk)	4:12
15.	"Sick Uncle" (Skit)	1:29
16.	"Shoot 1st" (featuring Paparue)	5:01
17.	"Too Hot"	4:55
Total length:		70:11

All tracks are produced by Mannie Fresh

== Charts ==
=== Weekly charts ===
Chart (1999)	Peak position
US Billboard 200	5
US Top R&B/Hip-Hop Albums (Billboard)	1

=== Year-end charts ===
Chart (1999)	Position
US Billboard 200	108
US Top R&B/Hip-Hop Albums (Billboard)	26

Chart (2000)	Position
US Billboard 200	194
US Top R&B/Hip-Hop Albums (Billboard)	69

== Certifications ==
Region	Certification	Certified units/sales
United States (RIAA)	Platinum	1,000,000^{^}
^{^} Shipments figures based on certification alone.

== See also ==
- List of number-one R&B albums of 1999 (U.S.)
