= Baller Blockin' =

Baller Blockin
- Directed by: Bryan "Birdman" Williams; Ronald "Slim" Williams; Steven Esteb
- Written by: Bryan "Birdman" Williams; Ronald "Slim" Williams; Steven Esteb
- Produced by: Bryan "Birdman" Williams; Ronald "Slim" Williams
- Starring: Cash Money Millionaires
- Cinematography: Joe Frantz
- Edited by: Scot Mosier
- Production company: Cash Money Records
- Distributed by: Cash Money Records
- Release date: December 4, 2000 (USA)
- Country: United States
- Language: English

Baller Blockin' is a 2000 crime film set in New Orleans' Magnolia Projects. It stars the Cash Money Millionaires, with cameos by comedians Anthony Johnson and T.K. Kirkland.

The film's soundtrack is performed by the Cash Money Millionaires.

== See also ==
- List of hood films
