= Raw & Uncut =

Studio album by Turk
- Released: August 12, 2003
- Recorded: 2003
- Genres: Southern hip-hop; gangsta rap
- Length: 1:02:29
- Label: Koch Records
- Producers: Ke'Noe (also exec.); Don Waun; KLC; Sinista; U.P.

Turk chronology
Young & Thuggin' (2001)	Raw & Uncut (2003)	Penitentiary Chances (2004)

Singles from Raw & Uncut'
- 1. "I Luv U For Dat" Released: 2003

Professional ratings
Review scores
Source	Rating
AllMusic	2/5 stars
RapReviews	7/10

Raw & Uncut is the second solo studio album by American rapper Turk. It was released on August 12, 2003 via Koch Records, making it his first album for the label after parting ways with Cash Money Records. Production was mainly handled by Ke'Noe, who also served as executive producer, and Sinista, Don Waun, KLC and UP. It features guest appearances from Ke'Noe, Tooley, B.G. and Bubba Sparxxx. The album was less successful than his previous one, peaking at No. 193 on the Billboard 200, No. 22 on the Top R&B/Hip-Hop Albums and No. 15 on the Independent Albums.

== Track listing ==
No.	Title	Writer(s)	Producer(s)	Length
1.	"U Thought It Was Over"	Tab Virgil; Maurice Jordan	Ke'Noe	3:36
2.	"Cock Aim Shoot"	Virgil; Jordan	Ke'Noe	3:56
3.	"Letter from That World"	Virgil; Jordan	Ke'Noe	4:23
4.	"Amped Up"	Virgil	KLC	4:11
5.	"Putcharaggsup (Remix)" (featuring B.G. and Ke'Noe)	Virgil; Christopher Noel Dorsey; Jordan	Ke'Noe	4:52
6.	"Keep It Ghetto"	Virgil	Sinister	4:04
7.	"Penitentiary Chances"	Virgil	Don Waun	4:26
8.	"Dat Look" (featuring Bubba Sparxxx)	Virgil; Warren Anderson Mathis; Jordan	Ke'Noe	4:13
9.	"I Been Through Dat"	Virgil	Ke'Noe	4:20
10.	"I Luv U for Dat"	Virgil	Up	4:11
11.	"All I Got in This World" (featuring Ke'Noe and Tooley)	Virgil	Ke'Noe; Sinister	3:47
12.	"What Cha Dranking On" (featuring Ke'Noe and Tooley)	Virgil; Jordan	Sinister	4:07
13.	"Who Put It Together"	Virgil; Jordan	Ke'Noe	4:11
14.	"Macking and Pimping" (featuring Ke'Noe)	Virgil; Jordan	Ke'Noe	5:08
15.	"I'm Tired"	Virgil	Ke'Noe	3:04
Total length:				1:02:29

== Charts ==
Chart performance for Raw & Uncut
Chart (2003)	Peak position
US Billboard 200	193
US Top R&B/Hip-Hop Albums (Billboard)	22
US Independent Albums (Billboard)	15
