= Cash Money Millionaires =

American hip-hop group

- Also known as: The Millionaires
- Origin: New Orleans, Louisiana, U.S.
- Genre: Southern hip-hop
- Years active: 1996–2001
- Labels: Cash Money; Universal
- Members: Big Tymers (Birdman and Mannie Fresh); Hot Boys (B.G., Juvenile, Lil Wayne and Turk)

The Cash Money Millionaires (also known as the Millionaires) are an American Southern hip-hop supergroup, composed of recording artists who were signed to Cash Money Records. It was formed in 1996 by the Big Tymers (Birdman and Mannie Fresh) and the Hot Boys (B.G., Juvenile, Lil Wayne and Turk).

The group embarked on tours with the Ruff Ryders and Nelly. In September 2000, the Millionaires released a soundtrack album to the film Baller Blockin', in which they starred. In 2001, the group disbanded due to monetary issues.

== Discography ==
=== Soundtrack albums ===
- Baller Blockin' (2000)

=== Instrumental albums ===
- Platinum Instrumentals (2000)

=== Singles ===
- "Baller Blockin'" with E-40 (2000)

== Filmography ==
- Baller Blockin' (2000)
- Tapout (2020)
- 50 Plates (2020)
