= Hot Boys =

American hip hop group

The Hot Boys
- From left to right: Turk, Juvenile, B.G., and Lil Wayne

Background information
- Also known as: The Hot Boyz
- Origin: Uptown New Orleans, Louisiana, U.S.
- Genres: Southern hip hop; gangsta rap; bounce
- Years active: 1997–2001; 2012; 2024–present
- Labels: Universal; Cash Money
- Spinoff of: Cash Money Millionaires
- Members: B.G. Lil Wayne; Juvenile; Turk
- Past members: Bulletproof

The Hot Boys (often styled as Hot Boy$) are an American hip hop group from Uptown New Orleans, Louisiana, formed in 1997 and composed of rappers B.G., Lil Wayne, Juvenile and Turk.

The group signed with then-independent record label Cash Money Records to release their debut studio album, Get It How U Live! (1997). Despite negative reviews, it peaked at number 37 on the Top R&B/Hip-Hop Albums chart with regional sales, and has since sold 400,000 units domestically. Following Cash Money's joint venture deal with Universal Records, the group released their second album, Guerrilla Warfare (1999), to further commercial success, peaking at number five on the Billboard 200, selling 142,000 copies in its first week, and receiving platinum certification by the Recording Industry Association of America (RIAA).

The group disbanded by 2003 when Juvenile, Turk, and B.G. left Cash Money, citing financial mismanagement, leaving Lil Wayne as the only original member signed to the label. Despite this, one further album from the group — Let 'Em Burn (2003), composed of material originally recorded between 1998 and 2000 — was released, and peaked at number 14 on the Billboard 200.

Many setbacks have prevented the group from having an official reunion. In 2006, Turk was sentenced to 14 years in prison for second degree attempted murder, slowing down plans for a reunion in 2009. Shortly before Turk's release from prison in 2012, B.G. was sentenced to 14 years in prison for gun possession and witness tampering; he was released in 2023. Since then, Hot Boys has managed to release one song together, a remix of Turk's 2012 song "Zip It".

== History ==
The Hot Boys formed in the summer of 1997 with original members B.G., Lil Wayne, Juvenile, Turk and Birdman's nephew Lil Derrick. Lil Derrick left the group shortly after recording the first album and was killed in 2002.

The Hot Boys made their first official appearance together on B.G.'s second studio album, It's All on U, Vol. 1. They soon released their debut album, titled Get It How U Live!, which sold over 300,000 copies, primarily in New Orleans. The album charted nationally as well at 37 on the Billboard R&B/Hip-Hop Albums Chart. In 1998, Ca$h Money agreed to a $30 million pressing and distribution deal with Universal Records. This led to releases such as Juvenile's 400 Degreez, which was certified 4× Platinum in America. The Hot Boys made numerous appearances on many of the albums' tracks such as, "Back That Azz Up" featuring Lil Wayne and Mannie Fresh, and "Ha", where the Hot Boys were featured in the music video and the remix. The Hot Boys appeared on both B.G. and Lil Wayne's albums in 1999, Chopper City In The Ghetto, by B.G., and, Tha Block Is Hot, by Lil Wayne Both albums were certified Platinum. The group also released singles such as, "Cash Money Is An Army" and "Bling Bling" by B.G., "Tha Block Is Hot" and "Respect Us" by Lil Wayne, and "U Understand" and "I Got That Fire" by Juvenile.

On July 27, 1999, The Hot Boys released their commercial debut and second studio album, Guerrilla Warfare, which reached No. 1 on the Billboard magazine Top R&B/Hip-Hop Albums chart and No. 5 on the Billboard 200. It featured two charting singles, "We On Fire" and "I Need A Hot Girl". "I Need a Hot Girl" peaked at No. 65 on the Billboard Hot 100. The album also had contributions from the Big Tymers, Baby and Mannie Fresh. Like with the group's previous album, Mannie Fresh produced every track.

In a 2001 interview with XXL, Juvenile made statements regarding his dissatisfaction with the label, and that he was leaving the label due to financial mismanagement. With Juvenile's departure, Hot Boys officially disbanded.

By 2003 B.G., Turk, and Juvenile had all departed from Cash Money for financial issues, leaving Lil Wayne as the group's only member still with the label. Cash Money still managed to release the group's final album together, Let 'Em Burn, composed of songs the group recorded between 1998 and 2000. The Hot Boys went on to have solo recording careers with varying degrees of success. Lil Wayne became the most prolific Hot Boy, with all of his albums going at least Gold in America and amassing a large fan base which grew with the development of his boutique label, Young Money. Turk was sentenced to 14 years imprisonment in 2006 and was released in October 2012. Juvenile and B.G. initially showed resentment to Cash Money but over time settled their disputes and disagreements with the label.

Following the group's disbandment in 2001, the group remained on hiatus until 2009, when Lil Wayne brought out Juvenile and B.G. at one of his shows on the I Am Music Tour in New Orleans. Lil Wayne had been reportedly trying to spearhead a Hot Boys reunion beginning in 2008, with the support of the other group members. However, by 2012, only two songs featuring Lil Wayne, Juvenile, and B.G. materialized: "Ya Heard Me" from B.G.'s 2009 album Too Hood 2 Be Hollywood and the exclusive "If I Ain't a Hot Boy". Although Turk was released from prison in 2012, talks of a reunion were quelled when B.G. was arrested for weapons possession in 2009 and subsequently sentenced to 14 years in federal prison for gun possession and witness tampering in 2012. In December 2012, Turk released a song called "Zip It" featuring Lil Wayne on his SoundCloud account. A few weeks later, a remix was released with Juvenile featured on the last verse. In February 2013, a version with all four members of the group was released, with B.G. recording his verse over the phone from prison. In 2013, The Hot Boys (minus B.G.) appeared in the video of 2 Chainz's song "Used 2", whose lyrics are reminiscent of Juvenile's "Back That Azz Up". "Used 2" was produced by Mannie Fresh, who also appears in the video. The Hot Boys (without B.G.) performed with Mannie Fresh during Lil Wayne's Lil WeezyAna Fest in August 2015. Lil Wayne, Juvenile, and The Big Tymers reunited on a song called "Hate" in 2016.

Turk was released from prison on October 12, 2012.

B.G was released from prison on September 5, 2023.

On May 19, 2024, Juvenile went on Instagram Live to confirm that the Hot Boys have reunited and are working on a new studio album.

== Discography ==
=== Studio albums ===
Title	Release	Peak chart positions		Sales	Certifications
Title	Release	US	US R&B	Sales	Certifications
Get It How U Live!	Released: October 28, 1997; Label: Cash Money; Format: CD	—	37	US: 400,000+	
Guerrilla Warfare	Released: July 27, 1999; Label: Universal, Cash Money; Format: CD	5	1	US: 1,000,000	RIAA: Platinum
Let 'Em Burn	Released: March 25, 2003; Label: Cash Money; Format: CD	14	3		

=== Collaboration albums ===
- Baller Blockin' with Cash Money Millionaires (2000)

=== Singles ===
==== As lead artist ====
Title	Release	Peak chart positions			Album
Title	Release	US	US R&B	US Rap	Album
"Neighborhood Superstar" (featuring Big Tymers)	1997	—	—	—	Get It How U Live!
"We on Fire"	1999	—	49		Guerrilla Warfare
"I Need a Hot Girl" (featuring Big Tymers)	1999	65	23	—	Guerrilla Warfare
"Rock Ice" (featuring Big Tymers)	1999	—	—	—	Blue Streak: The Album
"My Section"	2003	—	—	—	Let 'Em Burn
"Gangsta Nigga"	2003	—	—	—	Let 'Em Burn
"—" denotes releases that did not chart.

Title	Release	Album	Artist
U.P.T.	1998	400 Degreez	Juvenile
Ha (Remix)	1998	400 Degreez	Juvenile
The Hood (It's All Good)	1999	The Wood (soundtrack)	Big Tymers
Play'n It Raw"	1999	Chopper City in the Ghetto	B.G.
"Ballers (Cash Money Remix)"	1999	Project Pat, Big Tymers	Ghetty Green
"Hypnotize Cash Money"	1999	Tear da Club Up Thugs, Big Tymers	CrazyNDaLazDayz
Kisha	1999	Tha Block Is Hot	Lil Wayne
Hope You NIggas Sleep	1999	Born Again	The Notorious B.I.G., Big Tymers
A Million and One Things	1999	Tha G-Code	Juvenile
We Ain't Stopping'	2000	I Got That Work	Big Tymers
My Life	2000	I Got That Work	Big Tymers
Millionaire	2000	Backstage: Music Inspired by the Film	DJ Clue, Big Tymers
Hit U Up	2000	Lights Out	Lil Wayne
4 Minutes	2001	Project English	Juvenile

== Filmography ==
- Baller Blockin' (2000)
