= Netflix (song) =

Promotional single by 2 Chainz featuring Fergie

from the album B.O.A.T.S. II: Me Time
- Released: August 26, 2013
- Recorded: 2013
- Genre: Hip hop
- Length: 3:55
- Label: Def Jam Recordings
- Songwriters: Tauheed Epps, Stacy Ferguson, J. Jones, Clayton Mays Jr., Pentz, Derek Allen
- Producers: Da Honorable C.N.O.T.E., Diplo (co.), DJA (add.)

Audio video
- "2 Chainz featuring Fergie "Netflix" (Audio - Explicit Version)" on YouTube

"Netflix" is a song by American rapper 2 Chainz from his second studio album B.O.A.T.S. II: Me Time. (2013) The song was released as the album's second promotional single on August 26, 2013. It was produced by Da Honorable C.N.O.T.E., Diplo and DJA and featured a guest appearance by Fergie. The song peaked on the US Billboard Bubbling Under R&B/Hip-Hop Singles at number six.

== Background ==
On August 26, 2013, 2 Chainz premiered "Netflix" featuring Fergie, from his second studio album B.O.A.T.S. II: Me Time. On the same day, it was serviced to DJs as the album's second promotional single.

== Chart performance ==
Chart (2013)	Peak position
US Bubbling Under R&B/Hip-Hop Singles (Billboard)	6

== Release history ==
Country	Date	Format	Label
United States	August 26, 2013	Digital download	Def Jam
