= Turk (rapper) =

American rapper (born 1981)

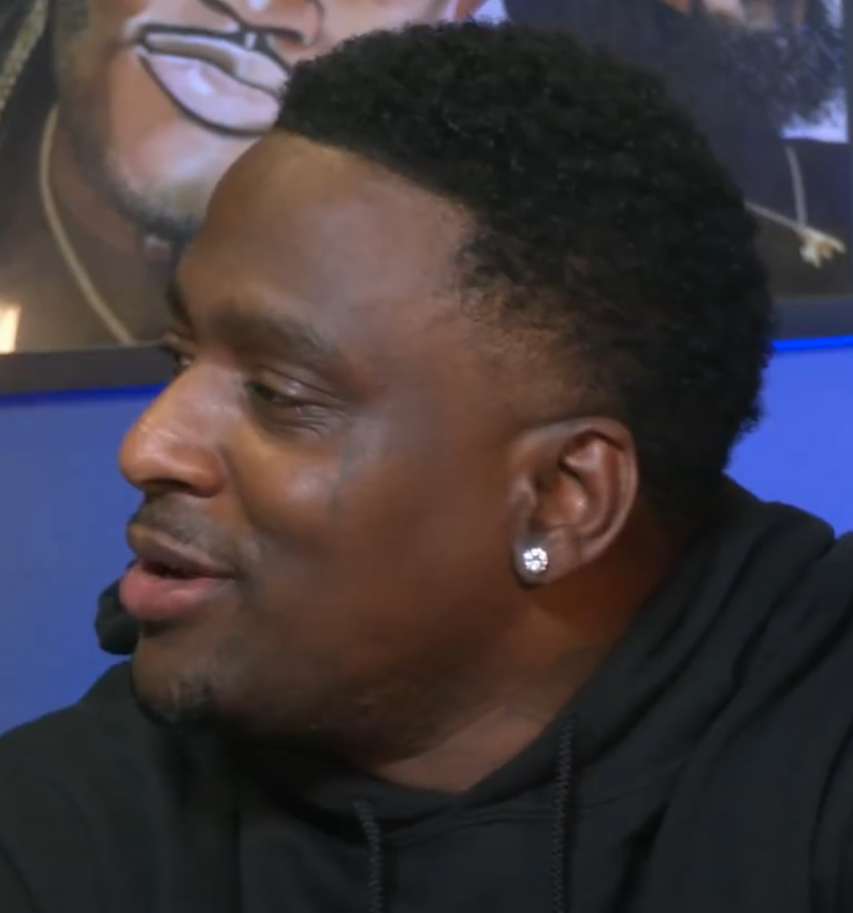
- Turk in 2021

Background information
- Born: February 8, 1981 (age 45); New Orleans, Louisiana, U.S.
- Genres: Southern hip-hop; gangsta rap; bounce; trap
- Occupations: Rapper; songwriter
- Years active: 1997–present
- Labels: Universal; Laboratory Recordz; Cash Money; Rap-A-Lot; YNT
- Formerly of: Hot Boys; Cash Money Millionaires

Tab Virgil Jr. (born February 8, 1981) better known by his stage name Turk (sometimes "Young Turk" or "Hot Boy Turk" or "CFOTAB"), is an American rapper from New Orleans, Louisiana. He is best known for his late 1990s run at Birdman's Cash Money Records with the group the Hot Boys.

== Early life ==
Virgil was born February 8, 1981, in New Orleans, to his mother "Gal" and his father Tab Virgil Sr. He grew up in the Magnolia Projects in the Third Ward and attended Fortier High School before dropping out. He was discovered by Birdman rapping with Magnolia Shorty at a block party.

== Career ==
Turk's debut commercial appearance was on Juvenile's Solja Rags (1997) album, guest performing on the songs "I Did That” and “Hide Out or Ride Out”.

Turk's debut studio album, Young & Thuggin' (2001) peaked at number nine on the Billboard 200. After the split of the Hot Boys in 2001, he departed from Cash Money in 2003 and he signed a recording contract with producer Ke'Noe through his label, Laboratory Recordz. His second and third albums, Raw & Uncut (2003) and Penitentiary Chances (2004) were released independently by Entertainment One Music. In 2005, Turk was convicted on federal charges of being a felon in possession of a firearm, a fugitive from justice in possession of a firearm, and an unlawful user addicted to a controlled substance in possession of a firearm. The charges arose from the shooting of a Memphis, Tennessee police officer in early 2004. He was sentenced to 10 years of incarceration. In 2006, he entered an Alford plea in Tennessee state court to second-degree attempted murder, based on the same incident, and was sentenced to 14 years imprisonment.

While incarcerated, Ke'Noe released two albums of unreleased Turk recordings titled Still A Hot Boy and Convicted Felons. The album's profits of were put on Turk's prison books. Turk was released from prison in October 2012 after nine years. In December 2012, Turk released the single "Zip It" featuring Lil Wayne. Shortly after, a remix with Juvenile was released. In February 2013, a version with Turk, Wayne, Juvenile and B.G. was released, making it the official Hot Boys reunion song. In 2013, Turk released a mixtape on SoundCloud, Blame It On The System.

In 2023, Turk stated that he changed his stage name to "CFOTAB."

== Legal issues ==
On January 26, 2004, at around 2:00pm local time, dozens of Shelby County Narcotics Officers and SWAT officers served a search warrant for drugs believed to be inside Turk's apartment in the Hickory Pointe Community in Southeast Memphis. After knocking on the door and identifying themselves led to no response, the officers entered and began searching the apartment. Turk then allegedly shot at them with a 9mm handgun. The officers and SWAT returned fire, engaging in a 15-minute shootout with Turk. Turk finally surrendered to Shelby County officers and the SWAT Team. Turk was charged Wednesday, January 28, 2004, with first-degree attempted murder for allegedly shooting two Memphis, Tennessee Police Officers.

In February 2015, Turk filed lawsuit against Cash Money Records for $1.3 million, over unpaid royalties for recordings dating back to 1999, including solo work from his debut Young & Thuggin' and group, the Hot Boys. The rapper eventually won the suit by default, when Cash Money failed to respond. However, in June 2015, Turk requested that the lawsuit be dismissed after both parties reached an amicable settlement.

== Discography ==
=== Studio albums ===
- Young & Thuggin' (2001)
- Raw & Uncut (2003)
- Penitentiary Chances (2004)
- Still A Hot Boy (2005)
- Convicted Felons (2006)
- Rich Thuggin (2022)
- Joseph (2025)
- Joseph Deluxe 2 (2025)

=== Collaboration albums ===
- Get It How U Live! with Hot Boys (1997)
- Guerrilla Warfare with Hot Boys (1999)
- Baller Blockin' with Cash Money Millionaires (2000)
- Let 'Em Burn with Hot Boys (2003)
