= Dark Days, Bright Nights =

Studio album by Bubba Sparxxx
- Released: October 9, 2001
- Recorded: 1999–2001
- Studio: Westlake Studios (Los Angeles, CA); The Frat House (Atlanta, GA); Down The Hall Studios (Atlanta, GA); 1210 Studios (Atlanta, GA); Mix It In The Mix (Atlanta, GA); The Dungeon Recording Studio (Atlanta, GA)
- Genre: Hip hop
- Length: 62:57
- Label: Beat Club; Interscope
- Producer: Shannon Houchins (also exec.); Timbaland; Organized Noize; Khalifani; Gerald Hall

Bubba Sparxxx chronology
Dark Days, Bright Nights (2001)	Deliverance (2003)

Singles from Dark Days, Bright Nights
- 1. "Ugly" Released: August 6, 2001; 2. "Lovely" Released: 2001

Dark Days, Bright Nights is the debut studio album by American hip hop recording artist Bubba Sparxxx from Georgia. It was released on October 9, 2001, via Beat Club and Interscope Records. Recording sessions took place at Westlake Recording Studios in Los Angeles, at the Frat House, Down the Hall Studios, 1210 Studios, Mix it in the Mix, and the Dungeon Recording Studio in Atlanta. Production was handled by Shannon Houchins, Timbaland, Khalifani, Organized Noize, and Gerald Hall. It features guest appearances from Timbaland, Backbone, Bohagon, C.I., Duddy Ken, Kosha, Sebastian and Sleepy Brown.

The album debuted at number 3 on the Billboard 200 with 132,000 copies sold in the first week released. A couple months later the record was certified gold by the Recording Industry Association of America with an excess of 500,000 copies sold, making it the most successful of his six full-length albums to date.

It includes the hit singles "Ugly" and "Lovely". The song "Regardless" was not an official single but did receive some radio airplay. The song "Bubba Talk" was featured on the soundtrack for the comedy film The Wash (2001).

== Critical reception ==
Professional ratings
Review scores
Source	Rating
AllMusic	4/5 stars
Entertainment Weekly	B−
HipHopDX	(3.5/5)
Los Angeles Times	3.5/4 stars
NME	4/5 stars
PopMatters	(mixed)
RapReviews	(8/10)
The Rolling Stone Album Guide	3/5 stars
The Village Voice	(favorable)

Dark Days, Bright Nights received generally positive reviews from music critics who praised both Timbaland and Organized Noize's sharp production and Bubba's loose delivery of Southern-fried tales. Steve 'Flash' Juon of RapReviews gave high praise to the album's production for mixing various genres and showcasing Bubba's countrified lyrics, concluding with, "Thanks to partnering with Timbaland, Bubba Sparxxx succeeds where similar artists such as Tow Down and Haystak didn't - but their day will come too. For now, Sparxxx sits alone atop a rap throne representing a kind of po' white rap even Marshall Mathers only WISHES he knew about". The Los Angeles Times credited Bubba's energetic flow and lyrics for lifting typical hip-hop tropes into interesting tales, calling it "Southern gothic as pulp comic book, unsettling and appealing in equal measure". Kitty Empire of NME praised Bubba for basking in his Southern roots with tracks both introspective and upbeat, concluding that "Like a country mile, 'Dark Days' is a little long at 19 tracks and 77-plus minutes. But it's crucial to stay the course. Because Bubba talk really is the latest word in hip-hop".

AllMusic's Stephen Thomas Erlewine noted that Bubba's voice usually gets lost in the production and lacks creativity but said that it still remains a presence throughout the album, due to Timbaland's genre-mixing production matching his energy, concluding that its "better than most rap debuts of 2001, not just because of the mastermind of Timbaland, but because Bubba Sparxxx is still a strong focal point, even when he tends to repeat himself". David Browne of Entertainment Weekly commended the album for showcasing Bubba's backwoods world with sharp production and authentic tales but felt that it devolved into materialistic brag rap with a production grab bag that's shifty, saying that, "Given these ingredients, the potential for a unique, powerful hip-hop statement is considerable. Unfortunately, neither Sparxxx nor his collaborators deliver fully on the promise". Maurice Bottomley of PopMatters was critical of Bubba throughout the album, saying that his lyrical skills lack variety in wordplay and imagery but found it workmanlike and honest in its delivery, concluding that "Even so, the world hardly needs another average rap album, which, whether you see Sparxxx as mere marketing gimmick or genuine signifier of the New South, I am afraid, is all Dark Days, Bright Nights represents".

== Track listing ==
No.	Title	Writer(s)	Producer(s)	Length
1.	"Take Off"	Warren Anderson Mathis; Timothy Mosley	Timbaland	2:32
2.	"Ugly"	Warren Anderson Mathis; Timothy Mosley	Timbaland	4:25
3.	"Any Porch"	Jemmie "KillaGroove" Watford; Wes Whitsett; Shannon Houchins	Shannon "Fat Shan" Houchins	1:18
4.	"Bubba Talk"	Warren Anderson Mathis; Timothy Mosley	Timbaland	3:48
5.	"Lovely"	Warren Anderson Mathis; Timothy Mosley	Timbaland	3:56
6.	"Betty Betty"	Warren Anderson Mathis; Shannon Houchins	Shannon "Fat Shan" Houchins	3:56
7.	"All the Same" (featuring Backbone & Sleepy Brown)	Warren Anderson Mathis; Jamahr Williams; Organized Noize	Organized Noize	4:24
8.	"Get Right"	Warren Anderson Mathis; Timothy Mosley	Timbaland	3:41
9.	"Open Wide" (featuring Sebastian)	Warren Anderson Mathis; Garland Mosley, Jr.; Timothy Mosley	Timbaland	4:47
10.	"Infected"	Warren Anderson Mathis; Manuel K. Morris	Khalifani	4:28
11.	"Twerk a Little" (featuring Timbaland)	Warren Anderson Mathis; Timothy Mosley	Timbaland	4:21
12.	"Take'm to the Water" (featuring Duddy Ken)	Warren Anderson Mathis; K. Richardson; Shannon Houchins	Shannon "Fat Shan" Houchins	4:31
13.	"Well Water"	Warren Anderson Mathis; Shannon Houchins	Shannon "Fat Shan" Houchins	4:45
14.	"The 1st Whutchacallit"	Warren Anderson Mathis; Manuel K. Morris	Khalifani	4:41
15.	"Bubba Sparxxx"	Warren Anderson Mathis; Organized Noize	Organized Noize	4:29
16.	"Regardless" (featuring C.I.)	Warren Anderson Mathis; W. White; Shannon Houchins	Shannon "Fat Shan" Houchins	4:36
17.	"If It's Bumpin'" (featuring Bo Hagon & Kosha)	Warren Anderson Mathis; Cedric Leonard; Kelvin Seldon; Gerald Hall	Gerald Hall	4:55
18.	"Dark Days, Bright Nights"	Warren Anderson Mathis; Shannon Houchins	Shannon "Fat Shan" Houchins	3:24
Total length:				1:02:57

Sample credits

- "Bubba Talk" contains elements from "Les Yeux Noirs (Dark Eyes)" by Coco Briaval and "Pena" by Šaban Bajramović
- "Lovely" contains elements from "Theme from Shaft" by Isaac Hayes
- "Ugly" contains elements from "Get Ur Freak On" by Missy Elliott

== Personnel ==
- Warren Anderson Mathis – vocals
- Timothy Zachary Mosley – vocals (tracks: 2, 4, 5, 8, 9, 11), producer & mixing (tracks: 1, 2, 4, 5, 8, 9, 11)
- Jemmie "KillaGroove" Watford – vocals (tracks: 3, 18)
- Missy "Misdemeanor" Elliott – vocals (track 2)
- Wes Whitsett – vocals (track 3)
- Patrick "Sleepy" Brown – vocals (track 7)
- Jamahr "Backbone" Williams – vocals (track 7)
- Garland Waverly Mosley Jr. – vocals (track 9)
- Ronesha Howard – vocals (track 11)
- K. "Duddy Ken" Richardson – vocals (track 12)
- W. "C.I." White – vocals (track 16)
- Cedric "Bo Hagon" Leonard – vocals (track 17)
- Kelvin "Kosha" Seldon – vocals (track 17)
- Charlene L. Keys – backing vocals (tracks: 2, 4)
- Gerald "Geo" Hall – backing vocals (tracks: 6, 17), producer (track 17), recording (tracks: 6, 13, 17)
- Jason Sylvain – backing vocals (track 13)
- Scott Storch – keyboards (tracks: 4, 5, 8), clavinet (track 15)
- William Ed Pettaway Jr. – guitar (track 4)
- William "Billy" Odum – guitar (track 7)
- Charlie Bereal – additional guitar (track 4)
- Aaron Ellis Mills – bass (track 7)
- Larry Gold – cello (tracks: 1, 9)
- Alexander Leen – viola (tracks: 1, 9)
- Emma Kummrow – violin (tracks: 1, 9)
- Gloria Stock – violin (tracks: 1, 9)
- Shannon "Fat Shan" Houchins – producer (tracks: 3, 6, 12, 13, 16, 18), mixing & recording (tracks: 6, 12, 13, 16, 18), mixing (track 17), executive producer
- Organized Noize – producer (tracks: 7, 15)
- Manuel "Khalifani" Morris – producer (tracks: 10, 14)
- "Senator" Jimmy Douglass – mixing (tracks: 1, 2, 4, 5, 7–9, 11, 15)
- "Captain" James Majors – mixing & recording (track 3)
- Josh Butler – mixing (tracks: 6, 13)
- Jarvis Blackshear – mixing (tracks: 10, 14)
- Sean "Shyboy" Davis – recording (tracks: 7, 15)
- Steve Penny – recording (track 15), engineering (tracks: 1, 2, 4, 5, 8, 9, 11)
- Jeff Kanan – assistant engineering (tracks: 1, 2, 4, 5, 8, 9, 11)
- Chris Gehringer – mastering
- Mozart Timadeas – executive producer
- Doug Kaye – co-executive producer
- Eric Spence – co-executive producer
- Marcus Spence – co-executive producer
- Michele Robinson – co-executive producer
- Drew FitzGerald – art direction
- Ian Alexander – A&R
- Bobby Stamps – management

== Chart positions ==
Chart (2001–2002)	Peak position
German Albums (Offizielle Top 100)	93
US Billboard 200	3
US Top R&B/Hip-Hop Albums (Billboard)	3

== Certifications ==
Region	Certification	Certified units/sales
United States (RIAA)	Gold	500,000^{^}
^{^} Shipments figures based on certification alone.
