= The Southwest Connection =

Studio album by C.W.B. (Lexx Luger, Dutch The Great and HayStak
- Released: May 2, 2006
- Genre: Southern hip hop; hardcore hip hop
- Length: 1:17:31
- Label: Paid in Full; Koch
- Producer: Flip (exec.); B-12 (exec.); Haystak (co-exec.); Sonny Bama; Sharif Iman; Lexx Luger; Sonny Paradise

Haystak chronology
| The New South (2005) | The Southwest Connection (2006) | Crackavelli (2007) |

Professional ratings
Review scores
| Source | Rating |
|---|---|
| AllMusic | 3/5 stars |

The SouthWest Connection (stylized The South ★ West Connection) is the studio album by American hip hop group C.W.B. (Crazy White Boyz), composed of Nashville rappers Haystak and Lexx Luger, and Oakland rapper Dutch the Great. It was released on May 2, 2006, through Paid in Full Entertainment with distribution via Koch Records. The album features guest appearances from A-Wax, C.G., Coz Pacino, JellyRoll and Smigg Dirtee among others.

== Track listing ==
| No. | Title | Length |
|---|---|---|
| 1. | "Undisputed" | 3:54 |
| 2. | "All Around the World" | 3:15 |
| 3. | "Take Me as I Am" | 4:43 |
| 4. | "Just Like You" | 3:48 |
| 5. | "Hustlin'" | 5:14 |
| 6. | "Sleepless" | 3:04 |
| 7. | "Physical" | 3:47 |
| 8. | "Right About Now" | 4:22 |
| 9. | "Wolves in Sheeps Clothing" | 3:57 |
| 10. | "Player Like Me" | 3:44 |
| 11. | "By the Bar" | 4:19 |
| 12. | "Dopeboy" | 6:43 |
| 13. | "Up in This Thang" | 3:39 |
| 14. | "Still Got It" | 3:25 |
| 15. | "1 Nite Stand" | 4:39 |
| 16. | "Still" | 5:40 |
| 17. | "Story of Me" | 4:53 |
| 18. | "Hold On" | 4:25 |
| Total length: | | 1:17:31 |
