= Ugly (Bubba Sparxxx song) =

Single by Bubba Sparxxx featuring Timbaland

from the album Dark Days, Bright Nights
- Released: August 6, 2001
- Genre: Hip hop
- Length: 4:25
- Label: Interscope; Beat Club
- Songwriters: Warren Mathis; Melissa Elliott; Tim Mosley
- Producer: Timbaland

Bubba Sparxxx singles chronology
"Ugly" (2001)	"Lovely" (2001)

Timbaland singles chronology
"We Need a Resolution" (2001)	"Ugly" (2001)	"Money Owners" (2002)

"Ugly" is a song by American rapper Bubba Sparxxx, released as the lead single from his debut album, Dark Days, Bright Nights. The song was produced and featured guest vocals from Timbaland. The song features a sample of Missy Elliott's "Get Ur Freak On" and uncredited backing vocals by Elliott's former protégée Tweet.

== Remix ==
The song's remix features a slightly remixed beat, guest vocals & a new chorus from producer and fellow rapper Timbaland and two verses by rapper Ms. Jade. It can be found on the CD single of the second single, "Lovely".

== Chart performance ==
The single was a success for Bubba, peaking at number 15 on the Billboard Hot 100 on November 3, 2001, and peaking at number six on both the Billboard Hot Rap Singles and Hot R&B/Hip-Hop Songs. To date, "Ugly" is Bubba's second biggest hit, his 2005 single "Ms. New Booty" being his most successful. Outside of the United States, "Ugly" peaked within the top ten of the charts in the United Kingdom, and the top twenty of the charts in the Netherlands and Norway.

Due to the success of "Ugly" in the United Kingdom, a Bhangra remix of the song's hook featured in episodes of the British children's TV sitcom The Basil Brush Show in various scenes featuring Anil, a coffee shop owner played by British Asian actor Ajay Chhabra.

The radio-edit version of the song is also used in the soundtrack to the video game TD Overdrive: The Brotherhood of Speed .

== Charts ==
=== Weekly charts ===
Weekly chart performance for "Ugly"
Chart (2001–2002)	Peak position
Belgium (Ultratop 50 Flanders)	40
Belgium (Ultratip Bubbling Under Wallonia)	4
Germany (GfK)	48
Ireland (IRMA)	38
Netherlands (Dutch Top 40)	16
Netherlands (Single Top 100)	18
Norway (VG-lista)	20
Scotland Singles (OCC)	18
Switzerland (Schweizer Hitparade)	54
UK Singles (OCC)	7
UK Dance (OCC)	2
UK Hip Hop/R&B (OCC)	2
US Billboard Hot 100	15
US Hot R&B/Hip-Hop Songs (Billboard)	6
US Hot Rap Songs (Billboard)	6
US Rhythmic Airplay (Billboard)	8

=== Year-end charts ===
Year-end chart performance for "Ugly"
Chart (2001)	Position
UK Urban (Music Week)	3
Hot R&B/Hip-Hop Singles & Tracks (Billboard)	65
