= Hard to Love =

Hard to Love or Hard 2 Love may refer to:

- Hard 2 Love (Haystak album), 2008
- Hard 2 Love (Lee Brice album), 2012
- Hard II Love, an Usher album, 2016
- "Hard to Love" (Blackpink song), 2022
- "Hard to Love" (Lee Brice song), 2012
- Hard to Love (mixtape), a mixtape by Moneybagg Yo, 2023
- "Hard 2 Love", a song by Haystak from Hard 2 Love, 2008
- "Hard to Love", a song by Matthew Koma, 2017
- "Hard to Love", a song by Calvin Harris from Funk Wav Bounces Vol. 1, 2017
- "Hard to Love", a song by One Ok Rock from Ambitions, 2017
- "Hard to Love", a song by the Drums from Portamento, 2011

== See also ==
- Hard Love (disambiguation)
- "Hard to Love You" a song by Dave Dee, Dozy, Beaky, Mick & Tich, 1966
