= The Natural (Haystak album) =

Studio album by Haystak
- Released: July 23, 2002
- Studio: Street Flavor Recording Studios (Nashville, Tennessee)
- Genre: Southern hip hop
- Length: 1:09:42
- Label: Koch Records; Street Flavor Records
- Producer: Kevin "DJ Dev" Grisham (also exec.); Sonny Paradise (also exec.); Shannon Sanders; Dale Babb

Haystak chronology
Car Fulla White Boys (2000)	The Natural (2002)	Return of the Mak Million (2003)

Professional ratings
Review scores
Source	Rating
AllMusic	4/5 stars

The Natural is the third solo studio album by American rapper Haystak. It was released on July 23, 2002, through Koch Records. Recording sessions took place at Street Flavor Recording Studios in Nashville, Tennessee. Production was handled by Kevin "DJ Dev" Grisham, Sonny Paradise, Shannon Sanders and Dale Babb. It features guest appearances from Quanie Cash, Dale Babb, Bubba Sparxxx, Raw One & Squeeky Clean.

The album peaked at number 164 on the Billboard 200 albums chart and at #31 on the Top R&B/Hip-Hop Albums chart in the United States, making it Haystak's first charted project.

Its sequel, The Natural II, was released on May 12, 2009, via Real Talk Entertainment.

== Track listing ==
No.	Title	Length
1.	"Intro"	0:16
2.	"White Boy"	4:33
3.	"In Here"	4:35
4.	"Dirty Dirty" (featuring Dale Babb)	4:02
5.	"You Got Money"	4:11
6.	"Different Kinda Lady"	5:08
7.	"Cool People"	3:52
8.	"Bangin" (featuring Quanie Cash)	4:26
9.	"Tonight's the Night"	4:10
10.	"Pit Bull" (Skit)	1:21
11.	"Killa Man Crew" (featuring Raw One & Squeeky Clean)	4:33
12.	"Fucked Up"	3:07
13.	"Life With No Crime"	4:11
14.	"We Get Them"	3:56
15.	"Run Hide Duck"	4:37
16.	"Aint Talkin' Bout' Nothin'"	4:07
17.	"You Cant Stop It"	4:08
18.	"Oh My God" (featuring Bubba Sparxxx)	4:29
Total length:		1:09:42

== Personnel ==
- Jason Winfree – main artist
- Dale "Eyes Havoc" Babb – vocals (track 4), backing vocals (track 16), producer (tracks: 4, 13, 16)
- Quanie Cash – vocals (track 8)
- Squeeky Clean – vocals (track 11)
- Raw One – vocals (track 11)
- Warren Anderson Mathis – vocals (track 18)
- Dutch The Great – vocals (track 18)
- Lexx Luger – vocals (track 18)
- Sonny Paradise – backing vocals (tracks: 5, 15), producer (tracks: 2–9, 11–17), executive producer
- David Davidson – strings (tracks: 6, 13)
- Andrew Ramsey – guitar (track 13)
- Kevin "DJ Dev" Grisham – producer (tracks: 2–9, 11–17), executive producer
- Shannon Sanders – producer (tracks: 2, 8, 9, 11, 14)
- Mark Linger – mixing
- Erik Wolf – mastering
- Jeff Gilligan – art direction & design

== Chart history ==
Chart (2002)	Peak position
US Billboard 200	164
US Top R&B/Hip-Hop Albums (Billboard)	31
US Independent Albums (Billboard)	13
US Heatseekers Albums (Billboard)	6
