= Bubba Sparxxx =

American rapper (born 1977)

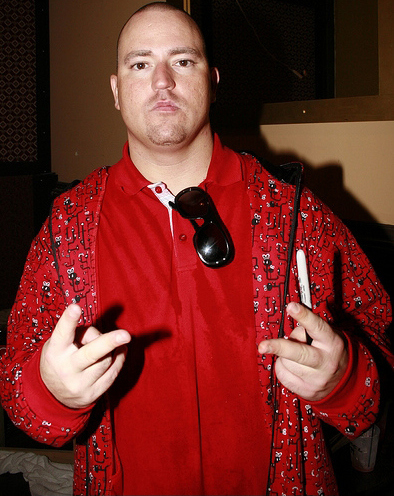
- Bubba Sparxxx in 2008

Background information
- Also known as: Bubba
- Born: Warren Anderson Mathis; March 6, 1977 (age 49); Troup County, Georgia, U.S.
- Genres: Southern hip-hop; country rap
- Occupations: Rapper; songwriter
- Years active: 1996–present
- Labels: Slumerican; New South; E1; Average Joe's; Backroad; Koch; Purple Ribbon; Virgin; Polydor; EMI; Interscope; Beat Club; 11th Hour; Noncents; So So Def
- Formerly of: Dungeon Family; Purple Ribbon All-Stars

Warren Anderson Mathis (born March 6, 1977), better known by his stage name Bubba Sparxxx, is an American rapper. His 2001 single, "Ugly" (featuring Timbaland) peaked at number 15 on the Billboard Hot 100 and led him to sign with Timbaland's Beat Club Records, an imprint of Interscope Records to release his debut studio album, Dark Days, Bright Nights (2001). A critical and commercial success, it peaked at number three on the Billboard 200.

His second album, Deliverance (2003) was met with further critical acclaim, while his third, The Charm (2006)—released by Big Boi's Purple Ribbon Records, an imprint of Virgin Records—yielded the single "Ms. New Booty" (featuring Ying Yang Twins and Mr. Collipark), which peaked at number seven on the Billboard Hot 100. This marked his final release on a major label, and his subsequent releases delved further into country rap.

== Early life ==
Mathis grew up in Troup County, Georgia, in a rural area near LaGrange. He is of French descent. His father was a school bus driver and his mother was a grocery store cashier. His closest neighbor, who lived half a mile (0.8 km) away, introduced him to rap music through mixtapes mailed from New York City. The music of 2 Live Crew was his introduction to hip hop; he began listening to West Coast gangsta rap such as N.W.A and Too Short and the Atlanta duo Outkast. With rapping as a hobby, he was a tight end and linebacker for his high school's football team and earned All-Region honors in his senior year. Steve Herndon, a former offensive lineman for the NFL's Atlanta Falcons and Denver Broncos, played football with him during high school, according to an interview with Down-South.com. In 2007, he moved to Tampa, Florida.

== Career ==
In 1996, he moved to Athens where he met industry veteran Bobby Stamps. Stamps noticed him rapping after a University of Georgia football game and later introduced him to Atlanta producer Shannon Houchins.

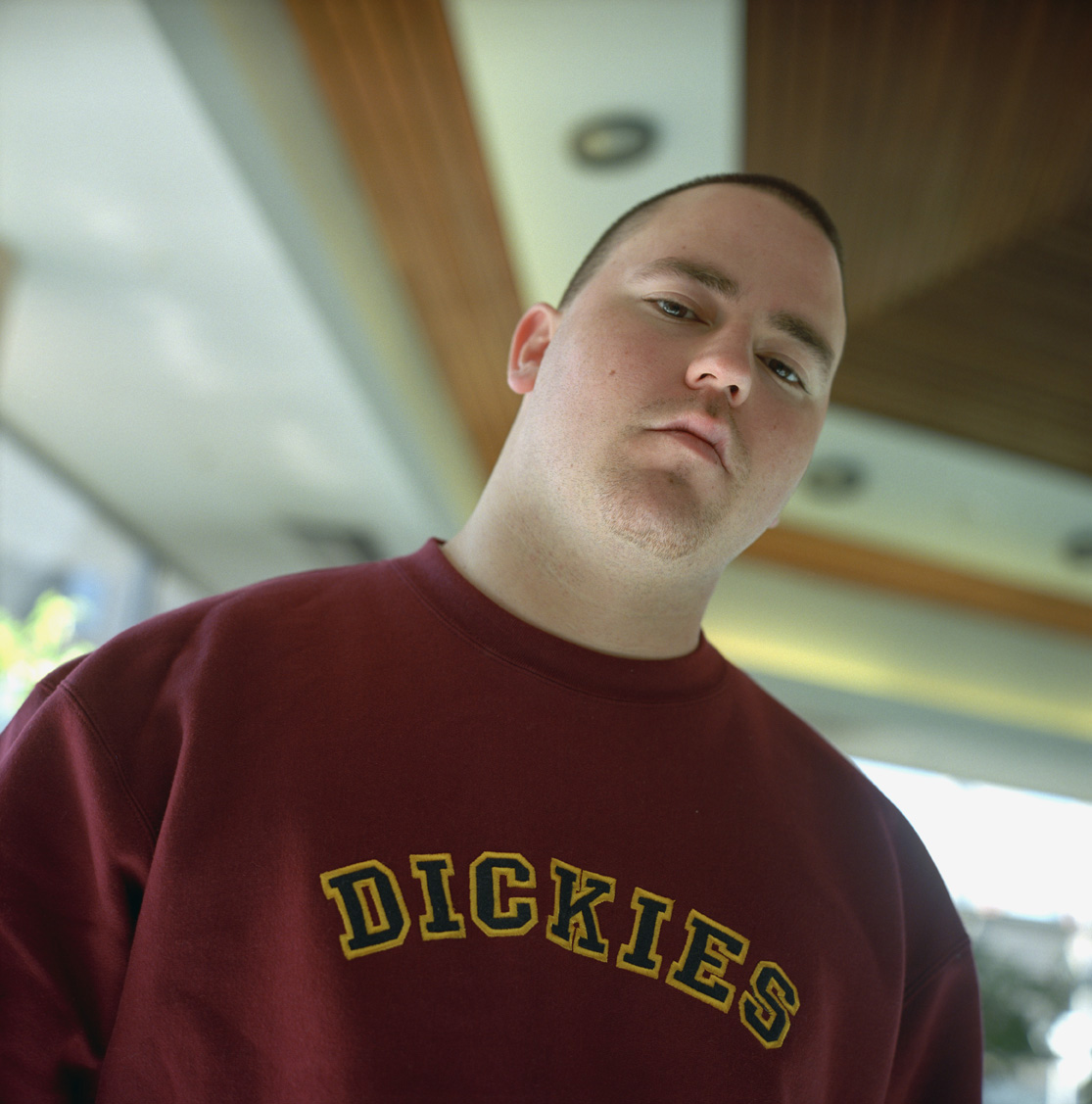
Bubba Sparxxx in 2002

For two years, Houchins and Stamps worked together to produce Sparxxx's first commercial release, Dark Days, Bright Nights, which released in 2001. The debut album saw some success in Georgia and caught the attention of Jimmy Iovine of Interscope Records. Sparxxx signed to Interscope and began working with record producers Timbaland and Organized Noize, as well as continuing to work with Shannon Houchins. The major-label reissue of Dark Days, Bright Nights, released via Timbaland's Beat Club Records imprint and which now included five collaborations with Timbaland and two with Organized Noise, debuted at #3 on the Billboard 200.

In 2002, he had a minor hit being featured on Archie Eversole's "We Ready", which became popular for being played at sporting events, such as American football and basketball games. In late 2003, he returned with his second album, Deliverance, which was critically acclaimed but sold poorly.

Sparxxx signed a recording contract with Virgin Records in 2004; under Virgin, Sparxxx released The Charm with singles "Ms. New Booty" and "Heat It Up".

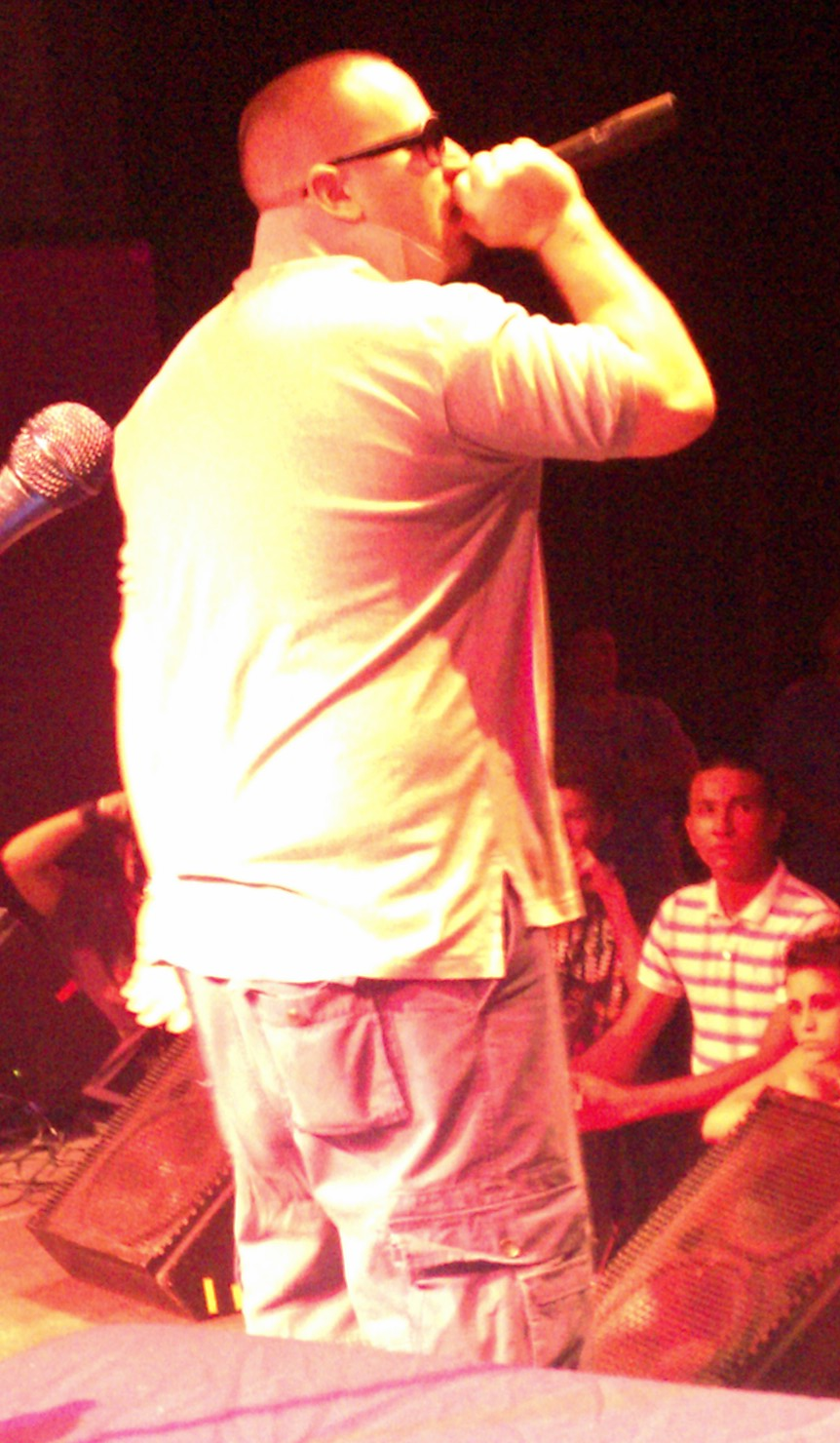
Bubba Sparxxx performing in 2010

He left Virgin to establish his own label, New South Entertainment, which is distributed by E1 Records. In 2007, he released a mixtape with DJ Burn One titled Survive Till Ya Thrive.

In 2012, he signed to Backroad Records, a subsidiary of the independent label Average Joes Entertainment owned by Shannon Houchins and Colt Ford, and recorded the song "Country Boy Coolin'" which was featured on Mud Digger Vol. 3, a compilation album released by Average Joe's on June 12, 2012. He stated in an interview that he planned on releasing an album to be called Miracle on Gamble Road, in 2012.

In January 2013, Sparxxx released the video "Splinter" which featured Crucifix. In July 2013, a video for his single "Country Folks", which features Danny Boone of the band Rehab and Colt Ford and produced by Houchins, was released. The album Pain Management was released on October 15, 2013.

In March 2016, Sparxxx signed to Yelawolf's Slumerican records imprint. On October 7, 2016, Sparxxx released his first release under Slumerican The Bubba Mathis EP. Sparxxx released Rapper From The Country on September 16, 2018, through New South Entertainment (E1).

On November 11, 2020, Sparxxx released an EP, Crickets with Hosier. On December 4, 2020, Sparxxx released his seventh album King of Crap through New South Entertainment which had the single "Bird Dawg". In May 2021, WorldStarHipHop released a video for "Bird Dawg".

== Discography ==
=== Studio albums ===
Title	Album details	Peak chart positions						Certifications (sales threshold)
Title	Album details	US	US R&B	US Rap	US Country	GER	NZ	Certifications (sales threshold)
Dark Days, Bright Nights	Release date: October 9, 2001; Label: Beat Club/Interscope Records	3	3	—	—	93	—	RIAA: Gold
Deliverance	Release date: September 16, 2003; Label: Beat Club/Interscope Records	10	9	—	—	44	30	
The Charm	Release date: April 4, 2006; Label: Virgin/Purple Ribbon Records	9	3	2	—	—	—	
Pain Management	Release date: October 15, 2013; Label: Backroad Records	—	—	—	40	—	—	
Made on McCosh Mill Road	Release date: June 24, 2014; Label: Backroad Records	—	—	—	49	—	—	
Rapper From the Country	Release date: September 14, 2018; Label: New South Entertainment	—	—	—	—	—	—	
King of Crap	Release date: December 4, 2020; Label: New South Entertainment	—	—	—	—	—	—	
Life Is Serious (Deluxe) (with Los Ghost)	Release Date: January 29, 2022; Label: SHG Entertainment	—	—	—	—	—	—	
"—" denotes releases that did not chart

=== Mixtapes ===
Title	Mixtape Details
Survive Till Ya Thrive	Release Date: August 17, 2007, Label: N/A

=== EPs ===
- The Bubba Mathis EP (2015)
- Crap Gawd (2021)

=== Collaborative EPs ===
- Crickets (with Hosier) (2020)
- Life Is Serious (with Los Ghost) (2021)

=== Singles ===
==== As lead artist ====
Title	Year	Peak chart positions						Certifications	Album
Title	Year	US	US R&B/HH	US Rap	IRE	NZ	UK	Certifications	Album
"Ugly" (featuring Timbaland)	2001	15	6	6	38	—	7		Dark Days, Bright Nights
"Lovely"	2001	—	77	—	—	—	24		Dark Days, Bright Nights
"They Ain't Ready" (with Jadakiss)	2001	—	60	—	—	—	—		Ryde or Die Vol. 3: In the "R" We Trust
"Jimmy Mathis"	2003	—	98	—	—	—	—		Deliverance
"Deliverance" (featuring Timbaland)	2003	101	107	22	—	—	55		Deliverance
"Back in the Mud"	2003	—	—	—	—	3	—		Deliverance
"Hey! (A Lil' Gratitude)"	2005	—	—	—	—	—	—		The Charm
"The Otherside" (featuring Petey Pablo and Sleepy Brown)	2005	—	—	—	—	—	—		The Charm
"Ms. New Booty" (featuring Ying Yang Twins and Mr. ColliPark)	2005	7	7	3	—	22	—	RIAA: 2× Platinum	The Charm
"Heat It Up"	2006	103	57	24	—	—	—		The Charm
"I Like It Alot"	2008	—	—	—	—	—	—		Best of Bubba Sparxxx
"She Got Me Like (Ahh Shit)" (featuring Ray J)	2008	—	—	—	—	—	—		The New South
"Beatin Down the Block" (featuring Dirt Reynolds)	2009	—	—	—	—	—	—		The New South
"Country Folks" (featuring Danny Boone and Colt Ford)	2012	—	—	—	—	—	—	RIAA: Gold	Pain Management
"Splinter" (featuring Crucifix)	2013	—	—	—	—	—	—		Pain Management
"Made On McCosh Mill Rd." (featuring Danny Boone)	2014	—	—	—	—	—	—		Made On McCosh Mill Road
"—" denotes releases that did not chart or receive certification.

==== As featured artist ====
Title	Year	Peak chart positions	Album
Title	Year	US R&B/HH	Album
"We Ready (Remix)" (Archie Eversole featuring Bubba Sparxxx)	2002	64	Ride Wit Me Dirty South Style
"Wylin" (The Lacs featuring Bubba Sparxxx)	2012	—	190 Proof

=== Guest appearances ===
Year	Song	Artist(s)	Album
2001	"Rearranged (Timbaland Remix)"	Limp Bizkit	New Old Songs
2001	"Bubba Talk"	—N/a	The Wash (soundtrack)
2001	"White Gutz"	Dungeon Family	Even in Darkness
2002	"PHDream"	The Crystal Method	Blade II (soundtrack)
2002	"Oh My God"	Haystak	The Natural
2002	"Hungry"	—N/a	Undisputed (soundtrack)
2002	"Oops (Oh My) [Amended Version]	Tweet	single
2002	"Right for Me"	Justin Timberlake	Justified
2003	"Club Hoppin'"	Jamelia	Thank You
2003	"Dat Look"	Turk	Raw & Uncut
2003	"Shenanigans"	Timbaland & Magoo	Under Construction, Part II
2004	"Get on Dis Motorcycle"	Petey Pablo	Still Writing in My Diary: 2nd Entry
2005	"Oh No"	Big Boi, Killer Mike	xXx: State of the Union (soundtrack)
2005	"Claremont Lounge"	Purple Ribbon All-Stars	Got Purp? Vol. 2
2011	"This Is Our Song" (Remix)	Colt Ford, The Lacs, Demun Jones, Rehab	Mud Digger Vol. 2
2012	"Show Some Skin"	Lil Wyte	Still Doubted
2012	"Wylin"	The Lacs	190 Proof
2012	"The Labyrinth"	Crystal Seth	District XXIII
2013	"Project X"	Shane Dollar and the Sense + Wody	Life, Love, and Hip Hop
2014	"Outlaw"	Shane Dollar	?
2014	"Baby Wussup"	Ricky Young	Feels Damn Good
2014	"Try Harder Than That"	Meghan Linsey	?
2016	"Take a Ride With Me"	Twang & Round	Take A Ride With Me
2017	"Born in Fire"	Boondox w/ Jamie Madrox & Struggle	The Murder
2018	"Beautiful Day"	Mike Smith and Jonathan Hay	Jail Tattoos
2024	"Chrome on the Wheels"	Landon Sears and Young Buck	All Men Lie

== Video game appearances ==
Bubba Sparxxx is a playable character in the video game Def Jam: Fight for NY.
