= Car Fulla White Boys =

Studio album by Haystak
- Released: July 20, 2000
- Studio: Street Flavor Recording Studios (Nashville, Tennessee)
- Genre: Southern hip hop
- Length: 57:56
- Label: Street Flavor Records; Koch Records
- Producer: Larry Paradise (exec.); Sonny Paradise (also exec.); Kevin "DJ Dev" Grisham; Shannon Sanders

Haystak chronology
Mak Million (1998)	Car Fulla White Boys (2000)	The Natural (2002)

Singles from Car Fulla White Boys
- 1. "Can't Tell Me Nothing" Released: 2001

Professional ratings
Review scores
Source	Rating
AllMusic	2/5 stars
HipHopDX	3/5 stars

Car Fulla White Boys is the second solo studio album by American rapper Haystak. It was released on July 20, 2000, via Street Flava Records and Koch Records. Recording sessions took place at Street Flavor Recording Studios in Nashville, Tennessee. Production was handled by Kevin "DJ Dev" Grisham, Sonny Paradise and Shannon Sanders.

== Track listing ==
All music is composed by Sonny Paradise, Kevin Grisham and Shannon "Mr. Wang" Sanders.

No.	Title	Length
1.	"Car Fulla White Boys"	4:40
2.	"Reckon"	3:42
3.	"Can't Tell Me Nothing"	4:29
4.	"Dollar"	4:02
5.	"Down South Players"	4:31
6.	"Ride"	3:45
7.	"Brother Like Me"	5:21
8.	"On Trial"	3:22
9.	"Need It Get It"	3:55
10.	"Wish You Could See Me"	5:21
11.	"Some of That"	3:22
12.	"The Bottom"	4:00
13.	"Love You Like"	4:07
14.	"Listen"	3:19
Total length:		57:56

== Personnel ==
- Jason Winfree – main artist
- Ayesha Porter – background vocals
- Ivy Brown – background vocals
- Jeff Priebe – background vocals
- Shannon Sanders – background vocals, horns, producer
- Terry Hudson – background vocals
- Andrew Ramsey – guitar & bass
- Charlie Barrett – guitar (track 10)
- Kevin "DJ Dev" Grisham – scratches, producer
- David Davidson – strings
- Sonny Paradise – producer, executive producer
- Brian Hardin – mixing
- Bernard Grundman – mastering
- Larry Paradise – executive producer
- Manor Graphix – graphics, layout, design
