= The Charm (Bubba Sparxxx album) =

Studio album by Bubba Sparxxx
- Released: April 4, 2006
- Recorded: 2005–2006
- Studio: The Dungeon Recording Studios (Atlanta, Georgia); Stankonia Recording (Atlanta, Georgia)
- Genre: Hip hop
- Length: 45:58
- Label: New South; Purple Ribbon; Virgin; EMI
- Producer: Big Boi; Organized Noize; Mr. Collipark; Mr. DJ; Timbaland; Slimm Jim; Sted-Fast; Jason "Koko" Bridges

Bubba Sparxxx chronology
| Deliverance (2003) | The Charm (2006) | Pain Management (2013) |

Singles from The Charm
- 1. "Ms. New Booty" Released: November 29, 2005; 2. "Heat It Up" Released: May 25, 2006

The Charm is the third studio album by American hip hop recording artist Bubba Sparxxx from Georgia. It was released on April 4, 2006 via Bubba Sparxxx's New South Entertainment, Big Boi's Purple Ribbon Records, Virgin Records, and EMI Records, a follow-up to Deliverance. Unlike the previous installments, it is the first album to have very little input from Timbaland, with production being handled and provided by Mr. Collipark and Organized Noize, and Big Boi serving as executive producer on the album. The guest appearances featured on the album were fellow rappers Cool Breeze, Petey Pablo, Duddy Ken, Killer Mike and the Ying Yang Twins, and singers Frankie J, Scar and Sleepy Brown.

The album received a generally positive reception but critics found it uneven in its amalgam of mainstream hip-hop songs and serious internal tracks. The Charm debuted at number 9 on the Billboard 200 with 51,000 copies sold in its first week released and spawned two singles: "Ms. New Booty" and "Heat It Up".

== Critical reception ==
Professional ratings
Aggregate scores
| Source | Rating |
|---|---|
| Metacritic | 66/100 |
Review scores
| Source | Rating |
| AllMusic | 3.5/5 stars |
| The A.V. Club | A− |
| Entertainment Weekly | B− |
| Los Angeles Times | 3/4 stars |
| Pitchfork | 7.7/10 |
| PopMatters | 4/10 stars |
| RapReviews | 7/10 |
| Rolling Stone | 2/5 stars |
| Stylus Magazine | B |
| Vibe | 3.5/5 stars |

The Charm garnered favorable reviews but music critics were divided by Bubba's decision to leave Timbaland for Big Boi and change his production and lyrical content. At Metacritic, which assigns a normalized rating out of 100 to reviews from mainstream critics, the album received an average score of 66, based on 18 reviews.

Nathan Rabin of The A.V. Club praised the production work from Organized Noize and Bubba for still being able to deliver strong philosophical lyrics with bits of humor in them, concluding that "Sparxxx will probably never move enough units to justify his early billing as rap's next great white hope, but creatively, he continues to exceed even the loftiest expectations". Soren Baker of the Los Angeles Times also praised Organized Noize's production for making Bubba sound commercially viable while allowing him to add more lyrical depth to his repertoire. Justin Cober-Lake of Stylus Magazine felt that the change in production from Deliverance didn't hamper Bubba's ability to continue delivering aggressive lyricism over club tracks.

Pitchfork writer Tom Breihan, despite finding some tracks that demean women, praised the upbeat and energetic production for allowing Bubba to lace them with introspective lyrics and funny punchlines, concluding that he "wants to become a pop star, and he probably won't succeed, but he hasn't lost his heart". Justin Monroe of Vibe said that despite mainstream tracks like "Run Away" and "Ms. New Booty", Bubba maintains his tendency to bring sharp lyricism to his rhymes, concluding that "While his hedged bets reduce both risk and reward, his rural raps restore at least some of the magic in The Charm". Steve 'Flash' Juon of RapReviews felt a little disappointed with the album, finding most of the material filled with either both strong production and tight lyricism or sub-standard beats and deflated delivery, concluding that "Bubba still has that potential and does come with some good tracks, but it's a short album you can finish in under an hour that compared to his prior works sounds and feels vaguely unsatisfying".

Michael Endelman of Entertainment Weekly was mixed towards the record, saying that crunk tracks like "Ms. New Booty" dour the experience after tracks like "Ain't Life Grand" exhibit Bubba's true talents as a rapper. Jeff Vrabel of PopMatters felt that the lack of Timbaland and presence of Big Boi as executive producer throughout the album allowed for dull and meandering beats for Bubba to use to deliver uninspired brag raps without any creativity, calling it "one of year's most disappointing belly-flops". Peter Relic of Rolling Stone criticized the record's production and Bubba's lyricism for feeling generic and lacking in charm like his previous efforts, concluding that "Though newly aligned with Big Boi's Purple Ribbon stable, Bubba Sparxxx appears only able to follow for now".

== Track listing ==
The Charm track listing
| No. | Title | Writer(s) | Producer(s) | Length |
|---|---|---|---|---|
| 1. | "Represent" | Warren Mathis; Rico Wade; Patrick Brown; Ray Murray | Organized Noize | 3:36 |
| 2. | "Heat It Up" | Mathis; Michael Crooms; Solomon Anderson | Mr. Collipark | 3:44 |
| 3. | "Claremont Lounge" (featuring Killer Mike and Cool Breeze) | Mathis; Murray; Wade; Brown; Michael Render; Frederick Bell | Organized Noize | 4:08 |
| 4. | "As the Rim Spins" | Mathis; Wade; Brown; Murray | Organized Noize | 2:59 |
| 5. | "That Man" (featuring Sleepy Brown and Duddy Ken) | Mathis; Brown; Kenny Richardson; David Sheats; Jeminesse Smith | Mr. DJ; Slimm Jim | 3:53 |
| 6. | "The Otherside" (featuring Petey Pablo and Sleepy Brown) | Mathis; Wade; Brown; Murray; Moses Barrett | Organized Noize | 3:57 |
| 7. | "Ain't Life Grand" (featuring Scar) | Mathis; Antwan Patton; Wade; Terrence Smith | Big Boi | 4:47 |
| 8. | "Run Away" (featuring Frankie J) | Mathis; Francisco Bautista; Jason Bridges; James Hargrove | Jason "Koko" Bridges; James D. "Sted-Fast" Hargrove | 4:00 |
| 9. | "Wonderful" | Mathis; Wade; Brown; Murray | Organized Noize | 3:43 |
| 10. | "Ms. New Booty" (featuring Ying Yang Twins and Mr. Collipark) | Mathis; Croms; Eric Jackson; Deongelo Holmes | Mr. Collipark | 4:40 |
| 11. | "Hey! (A Lil' Gratitude)" | Mathis; Timothy Mosley | Timbaland | 3:59 |

== Chart history ==
=== Weekly charts ===
Weekly chart performance for The Charm
| Chart (2006) | Peak position |
|---|---|
| US Billboard 200 | 9 |
| US Top R&B/Hip-Hop Albums (Billboard) | 3 |
| US Top Rap Albums (Billboard) | 2 |

=== Year-end charts ===
Year-end chart performance for The Charm
| Chart (2006) | Position |
|---|---|
| US Top R&B/Hip-Hop Albums (Billboard) | 90 |
