= Came a Long Way =

Studio album by Haystak
- Released: July 21, 2009
- Genre: Rap, Southern rap
- Label: Select-O-Hits

Haystak chronology
| The Natural II (2009) | Came a Long Way (2009) | Easy 2 Hate (2010) |

Came a Long Way is the tenth full-length album released by Haystak on July 21, 2009. It was Haystak's second album of 2009. The album peaked at 39 on the US Top R&B/Hip Hop Albums, 22 on the Heakseekers Albums, and 16 on the Rap Albums chart.

== Track listing ==
1. "Come So Hard" – 5:20
2. "I Am Legend" – 4:16
3. "The Hatred Is High" – 4:12
4. "I Am That White Boy" – 5:14
5. "Village Idiot" – 4:13
6. "Keep Playin!!!" – 4:31
7. "What's Work" – 4:08
8. "Pavarotti" – 3:26
9. "Relevant" – 4:40
10. "White Boys" – 3:59
11. "Outta Town" (interlude) – 0:32
12. "Varoom" – 4:19
13. "Waiting for You" – 4:44
14. "Gone for So Long" – 4:51
15. "David & Goliath" – 5:49
16. "Bitch" – 3:40
17. "Paper Boy" – 5:10
18. "Killers" – 5:05
