= Mak Million =

Studio album by Haystak
- Released: September 15, 1998
- Genre: Rap, Southern rap
- Length: 64:32
- Label: Street Flava

Haystak chronology
_	Mak Million	Car Fulla White Boys (2000)

Mak Million is the debut album of Haystak, released on Street Flava Records in 1998.

== Mak Million ==
1. "Intro" - 0:54
2. "Go 2 War" - 3:41
3. "Flossin'" (featuring Pistol) - 3:54
4. "Came Along Way" - 4:31
5. "Down Yonder" - 4:23
6. "Yeah" - 4:56
7. "M-O-N-E-Y" - 4:19
8. "So Dope" - 5:12
9. "S.S. Big Pimp" - 4:35
10. "Don't Want It" - 4:21
11. "Ballin'" - 5:41
12. "Desperado" - 4:15
13. "Worldwide" - 4:19
14. "A Self-Made Man" - 4:21
15. "Strugglin' Strivin'" - 5:10
