= Hard Love =

Hard Love may refer to:

- Hard Love (novel), a 1999 novel by Ellen Wittlinger
- Hard Love (album), a 2016 album by Needtobreathe
  - "Hard Love", the title track from the album above
- "Hard Love", a 2016 song by Ellie Drennan
- "Hard Love", a 2017 album by Strand of Oaks

== See also ==
- Hard to Love (disambiguation)
