= Archie Eversole =

American rapper (1984–2022)

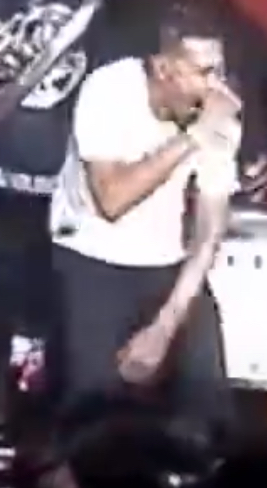
- Eversole in 2019

Background information
- Born: Arthur Lee Eversole; July 26, 1984; West Germany
- Origin: Atlanta, Georgia, U.S.
- Died: April 3, 2022 (aged 37) Decatur, Georgia, U.S.
- Cause of death: Gunshot wound
- Genre: Hip-hop
- Occupations: Rapper; songwriter
- Years active: 2000–2022

Arthur Lee "Archie" Eversole (July 26, 1984 – April 3, 2022) was an American rapper best known for his 2002 single "We Ready".

== Early life ==
Eversole was born in West Germany while his military parents were stationed in the country. His parents would move to College Park, Georgia, where he was raised.

== Career ==
Eversole recorded his lone full-length album, Ride Wit Me Dirty South Style, when he was seventeen years old. It was first released in 2001 by independent label Phat Boy Records and then rereleased by MCA Records in 2002, peaking at #83 on the Billboard 200 and #16 on Top R&B/Hip-Hop Albums. The featured single, "We Ready", contained a sample of the 1969 Steam song "Na Na Hey Hey Kiss Him Goodbye". Though it only reached #64 on the Billboard Hot R&B/Hip-Hop Songs chart, the track proved popular in the sports world, as it was included in promotional material for the National Football League and was played during home matches of the Major League Soccer club Atlanta United, while the Kansas City Royals adopted it as their anthem for their 2014 MLB postseason campaign. A music video was filmed for a remix of the song that featured Bubba Sparxxx.

In 2018, Eversole recorded "United We Conquer", a fight song dedicated to Atlanta United.

== Death ==
On March 25, 2022, Eversole was found by police at a Decatur gas station with a gunshot wound to his face. He said that someone had broken into his bedroom and shot him while he was asleep. Eversole was hospitalized but died from his injuries at age 37 on April 3. His brother, Alexander Krause, was arrested at Eversole's home and charged with murder after officers had noticed bloodstains on his socks.

== Discography ==
=== Albums ===
Title	Album details	Peak chart positions	
Title	Album details	US	US R&B/HH
Ride Wit Me Dirty South Style	Released: June 18, 2002; Label: Phat Boy/MCA Records; Format: CD, LP	83	16

=== As lead artist ===
List of singles, with selected chart positions, showing year released and album name
Title	Year	Peak chart positions	Album
Title	Year	US R&B/HH	Album
"We Ready" (solo or remix featuring Bubba Sparxxx)	2002	64	Ride Wit Me Dirty South Style
"My Hood" (featuring Mack 10)	2002	—	
"I Hear Ya Talkin'" (featuring Big Gipp)	2003	—	
"—" denotes a recording that did not chart.

=== As featured artist ===
- "ATL", Baby D featuring Archie Eversole, Pastor Troy, and Lil Jon, 2002
- "Turn It Up" Kindred the Family Soul featuring Archie Eversole, 2005

== See also ==
- List of murdered hip-hop musicians
