= Deliverance (Bubba Sparxxx album) =

Studio album by Bubba Sparxxx
- Released: September 16, 2003
- Studio: The Dungeon; ZAC (Atlanta); Hit Factory Criteria (Miami); Manhattan Center (New York City); The Studio (Philadelphia)
- Genre: Southern hip hop; progressive rap; country rap
- Length: 61:56
- Label: Beat Club; Interscope
- Producer: Bill Pettaway; Organized Noize; Timbaland

Bubba Sparxxx chronology
Dark Days, Bright Nights (2001)	Deliverance (2003)	The Charm (2006)

Singles from Deliverance
- 1. "Jimmy Mathis" Released: June 3, 2003; 2. "Deliverance" Released: March 8, 2004; 3. "Back in the Mud" Released: April 12, 2004

Deliverance is the second studio album by American rapper Bubba Sparxxx. It was released on September 16, 2003, by Beat Club and Interscope Records. The album was produced by Timbaland and Organized Noize. It was supported by three singles: "Jimmy Mathis", "Deliverance", and "Back in the Mud".

== Critical reception ==
Professional ratings
Aggregate scores
Source	Rating
Metacritic	82/100
Review scores
Source	Rating
AllMusic	4/5 stars
Blender	4/5 stars
Entertainment Weekly	B+
The Guardian	4/5 stars
NME	7/10
Q	4/5 stars
Rolling Stone	3/5 stars
Spin	A−
Uncut	4/5 stars
USA Today	3/4 stars

Deliverance was met with widespread critical acclaim. At Metacritic, which assigns a normalized rating out of 100 to reviews from professional publications, the album received an average score of 82, based on 17 reviews.

Johnny Loftus of AllMusic said, "Sure, his collaborators have some of the best beats in the business. But they can't always take up the slack when Bubba's raps start to wither in the heat". Nathan Rabin of The A.V. Club said, "Mixes hip-hop and country with ease and grace". Michael Endelman of Entertainment Weekly said, "A sober rumination about life in the poor, white, rural South". Dorian Lynskey of The Guardian said, "An intense, brooding piece of work". Matt Cibula of PopMatters said, "He and his producers have constructed a monument to this New New New South. And you don't really have to believe in it in order to appreciate what a great record this is".

Josh Timmermann of Stylus Magazine said, "In a year that's produced first-rate albums by OutKast and Lucinda Williams, Bubba, a self-proclaimed redneck from rural Georgia who most people pegged as a probable one-hit wonder three years ago, has beaten the odds and made both the hip-hop and country album of the year". Vibe said, "Sparxxx has now crafted a gem, thanks to improved songwriting and nimble production". Kandia Crazy Horse of The Village Voice said, "If Eminem is hip-hop's Elvis, then Bubba is its Gregg Allman, the white boy embraced by lowdown Little Africa, especially fellow musicians". Steve Jones of USA Today said, "Sparxxx's real strength lies in his intensely personal lyrics, which resonate whether he's talking about overcoming white-trash stereotypes or recovering from last night's bender". Nathan Brackett of Rolling Stone said, "A few of the honky-tonk touches -- such as the corny country crooning on "My Baby's Gone"—feel like gimmicks. But Sparxxx's lyrics are no shtick".

=== Accolades ===
In 2010, Rhapsody included it in its list of "The 10 Best Albums By White Rappers".

== Commercial performance ==
Deliverance debuted at number 10 on the US Billboard 200, with first-week sales of 64,000 copies in the United States.

== Track listing ==
Credits were adapted from the album's liner notes.

Deliverance track listing
No.	Title	Writer(s)	Producer(s)	Length
1.	"Intro" (featuring Big Rube)	Warren Anderson Mathis; Ruben Bailey; Patrick Brown; Ray Murray; Rico Wade	Organized Noize	2:15
2.	"Jimmy Mathis"	Mathis; Kenny Buttrey; Charlie McCoy; Timothy Mosley	Timbaland	3:09
3.	"Comin' Round"	Mathis; Ben Kaufman; Mosley	Timbaland	3:21
4.	"She Tried" (featuring Ryan Tedder)	Mathis; Mosley; Ryan Tedder	Timbaland	3:49
5.	"Nowhere" (featuring Kiley Dean)	Mathis; Mosley	Timbaland	5:37
6.	"Overcome"	Mathis; Mosley	Timbaland	4:54
7.	"Warrant Interlude"	Paul Blake; Mosley	Timbaland	2:22
8.	"Warrant" (featuring Attitude)	Mathis; Mosley; Timothy Clayton; Bill Pettaway	Timbaland; Pettaway	5:10
9.	"New South" (featuring Duddy Ken)	Mathis; Kenny Richardson; Brown; Murray; Wade	Organized Noize	4:01
10.	"Deliverance" (featuring Timbaland)	Mathis; Mosley; Jimmy Douglass	Timbaland	5:06
11.	"Hootnanny" (featuring Justin Timberlake)	Mathis; Mosley	Timbaland	4:24
12.	"Take a Load Off"	Mathis; Mosley	Timbaland	4:23
13.	"Like It or Not" (featuring Sleepy Brown)	Mathis; Brown; Michael Hartnett; Murray; Wade	Organized Noize	5:21
14.	"My Tone"	Mathis; Mosley	Timbaland	3:49
15.	"Back in the Mud" (featuring Sleepy Brown)	Mathis; Brown; Marqueze Ethridge; Stuart Jordan; Murray; Wade	Organized Noize	4:13
Total length:				61:56

Notes

- "Intro" features additional vocals by Brandon "Shug" Bennett
- "Nowhere" and "Overcome" features background vocals by GA Choir and Tye Tribbett
- "Warrant" features additional vocals by Dionne Moore and Timbaland
- "New South", "Hootnanny", "Take a Load Off" and "My Tone" features additional vocals by Timbaland
- "Back in the Mud" features additional vocals by Chip Glass

Sample credits

- "Jimmy Mathis" contains a sample of "Stone Fox Chase", performed by Area Code 615.
- "Comin' Round" contains a sample of "To See You Coming 'Round the Bend", performed by Yonder Mountain String Band.

== Charts ==
Chart performance for Deliverance
Chart (2003–2004)	Peak position
Dutch Albums (Album Top 100)	34
German Albums (Offizielle Top 100)	44
US Billboard 200	10
US Top R&B/Hip-Hop Albums (Billboard)	9
