= Business as Usual (Haystak & Jelly Roll album) =

Studio album by Haystak and JellyRoll
- Released: November 19, 2013
- Genre: Hip-hop
- Length: 1:03:54
- Label: Haystak Inc.
- Producer: BandPlay; Oktaine; Pee Wee; Shape Shifta; Slam; Street Empire; Thomas "Stoner" Toner

Haystak and JellyRoll chronology
Strictly Business (2011)	Business as Usual (2013)

Haystak chronology
Strictly Business (2011)	Business as Usual (2013)	Still Standing (2016)

JellyRoll chronology
No Filter (2013)	Business as Usual (2013)	Sobriety Sucks (2016)

Business as Usual is the second and final full-length collaborative studio album by American rappers Haystak and Jelly Roll. It was released on November 19, 2013 via Haystak Inc. Production was handled by Oktaine, Street Empire, Slam, Bandplay, Pee Wee, Shape Shifta, and Thomas "Greenway" Toner a.k.a. T-Stoner. It features guest appearances from Big Snap, Charlie P, Ryan Terrell, Robin Raynelle, Squinta and Zodiak Black. The album peaked at number 42 on the Top R&B/Hip-Hop Albums and number 11 on the Heatseekers Albums charts in the United States.

== Track listing ==
No.	Title	Producer(s)	Length
1.	"Business as Usual"	Oktaine	3:25
2.	"All Over the Road" (featuring Charlie P)	Street Empire	4:21
3.	"Money"	Shape Shifta	3:14
4.	"Boyfriend"	BandPlay	2:58
5.	"Independent Legend"	Oktaine	3:11
6.	"Keep It Gangsta"	BandPlay	3:19
7.	"Winners" (featuring Robin Raynelle)	Slam	3:51
8.	"Please God"	Oktaine	2:35
9.	"Hello" (featuring Big Snap)	Slam	4:01
10.	"We Don't"	Slam	3:25
11.	"Bad Guy" (featuring Squinta)	Greenway	3:32
12.	"Party Girl" (featuring Big Snap, Zodiak Black and Charlie P)	Pee Wee	5:01
13.	"Over Here"	Oktaine	3:36
14.	"Early Days"	Street Empire	2:45
15.	"Life" (featuring Ryan Terrell)	Street Empire	4:09
16.	"Safely Say"	Oktaine	3:23
17.	"Every Now and Then"	Street Empire	3:27
18.	"Locked and Loaded"	Oktaine	3:41
Total length:			1:03:54

== Charts ==
Chart (2013)	Peak position
US Top R&B/Hip-Hop Albums (Billboard)	42
US Heatseekers Albums (Billboard)	11
