= Deliverance (Bubba Sparxxx song) =

Single by Bubba Sparxxx featuring Timbaland

from the album Deliverance
- Released: April 28, 2003
- Recorded: 2003
- Length: 5:06
- Label: Beat Club; Interscope
- Songwriters: Warren Mathis; Timothy Mosley; J. Douglass
- Producer: Timbaland

Bubba Sparxxx singles chronology
"Jimmy Mathis" (2003)	"Deliverance" (2003)	"Back in the Mud" (2003)

Timbaland singles chronology
"Cry Me a River" (2002)	"Deliverance" (2003)	"Headsprung" (2004)

Music video
- Video on YouTube

"Deliverance" is a song by American rapper Bubba Sparxxx, released as the second single from his second studio album of the same name. The song features production from Timbaland, who also provides guest vocals in the chorus. In addition, he also makes an appearance in the video, strumming a guitar in front of a town sign at an intersection that says "Deliverance, GA. Pop: 501"

== Music video ==
The music video is influenced by the film O Brother, Where Art Thou?, showing convicts escaping from a chain-gang in the mid-20th century rural South. The video was directed by Bryan Barber.

== Charts ==
Chart (2003)	Peak position
Germany (Media Control AG)	27
Netherlands (Dutch Top 40)	29
UK Singles (The Official Charts Company)	55
US Bubbling Under Hot 100 Singles (Billboard)	1
US Bubbling Under R&B/Hip-Hop Singles (Billboard)	7
US Rap Songs (Billboard)	22
