= Crackavelli =

Studio album by Haystak
- Released: March 20, 2007
- Genre: Hip hop
- Length: 1:58:40
- Label: 40 West Records
- Producer: Haystak (exec.); Nick D (exec.); Sonny Paradise (exec.)

Haystak chronology
The New South (2005)	Crackavelli (2007)	Hard 2 Love (2008)

Professional ratings
Review scores
Source	Rating
RapReviews	7.5/10

Crackavelli is the seventh solo studio album by American rapper Haystak. It was released on March 20, 2007 through 40 West Records and Street Flavor Records with distribution via Select-O-Hits.

== Track listing ==
=== Disc 1 ===
1. "Intro" - 1:00
2. "Crackavelli" - 3:44
3. "I'm Haystak" - 4:33
4. "Bounce Through Ya Block" - 3:50
5. "Trouble Man" - 4:37
6. "Make You Fly" - 4:45
7. "Track 7 ft. Bun B" - 3:57
8. "Boss Status" - 3:58
9. "Kindness For Weakness" - 4:21
10. "Reloaded" - 4:29
11. "You Soft" - 3:52
12. "Baked" - 4:46
13. "Fall Through The Club" - 5:13
14. "Freak Show" (skit) - 1:17
15. "Freak Show" - 3:50

=== Disc 2 ===
1. "Welcome To Nashville" - 0:30
2. "Nashville" - 4:15
3. "Angels" - 5:02
4. "My Lyrics" - 3:35
5. "Drive" - 3:51
6. "Excess Weight" - 4:36
7. "Let's Ride" - 3:50
8. "Pray For Me" - 3:56
9. "Nothing Is Wrong" - 4:47
10. "Respect" - 4:14
11. "Special Kinda Girl" - 4:19
12. "Sail On" - 5:30
13. "Rap Money" - 3:04
14. "Change" - 4:40
15. "Pale Face" - 4:19

== Chart history ==
Chart (2002)	Peak position
US Billboard 200	186
US Top R&B/Hip-Hop Albums (Billboard)	38
US Top Rap Albums (Billboard)	19
US Independent Albums (Billboard)	24
US Heatseekers Albums (Billboard)	7
