= Portrait of a White Boy =

Studio album by Haystak
- Released: October 19, 2004
- Genre: Southern hip hop
- Length: 1:11:19
- Label: 40 West Records
- Producer: Sonny Paradise

Haystak chronology
Return of the Mak Million (2003)	Portrait of a White Boy (2004)	From Start to Finish: Part Two of the White Boy Trilogy (2005)

Professional ratings
Review scores
Source	Rating
RapReviews	7/10

Portrait of a White Boy: Part One of the White Boy Trilogy is the fifth solo studio album by American rapper Haystak. It was released on October 19, 2004 through 40 West Records and Street Flavor Records.

== Track listing ==
1. "Intro" - 1:03
2. "Fight, Write, Die" - 4:46
3. "Dadgummit" - 4:13
4. "Broads & Alcohol" - 3:43
5. "Red Light" - 5:10
6. "Hustle & Flow" - 4:29
7. "Still You Doubted Me" - 4:33
8. "Off Tha Wall" - 4:21
9. "Girl" - 3:41
10. "My First Day" - 5:06
11. "Make Money" - 4:03
12. "Strangest Dream" - 4:41
13. "Big" - 3:48
14. "Staks World" - 3:58
15. "Safety Off" - 3:58
16. "First White Boy" - 4:23
17. "Done" - 3:51
