= Cracks the Safe =

Studio album by Haystak
- Released: September 2, 2008
- Genre: Rap, Southern rap
- Length: 58:55

Haystak chronology
Hard 2 Love (2008)	Cracks the Safe (2008)	The Natural II (2009)

Cracks the Safe is a full-length album released by Haystak on September 2, 2008. The album peaked at 66 on the Billboard R&B/Hip-Hop Albums chart.

== Track listing ==
1. "Haystak" - 0:21
2. "B.I.G. Till I D.I.E." - 3:54
3. "Blessings" - 5:06
4. "Who Can Do It Better" - 4:13
5. "Bigger Than That" - 4:23
6. "Here Go" - 4:24
7. "Test Yo Heart" - 4:11
8. "Gotta Watch" - 3:45
9. "Yall Gone Make Us" - 4:33
10. "Im Wit It" - 3:45
11. "My Pain" - 3:28
12. "H#&& Naw!" - 4:52
13. "Im So Tired" - 4:21
14. "F@#$ Em!" - 3:45
15. "The Hole" - 3:54
