= From Start to Finish =

Studio album by Haystak
- Released: July 26, 2005
- Genre: Southern hip-hop
- Length: 1:10:20
- Label: 40 West Records
- Producer: Sonny Paradise; Jody Stevens

Haystak chronology
Portrait of a White Boy: Part One of the White Boy Trilogy (2004)	From Start to Finish (2005)	The New South (2005)

From Start to Finish: Part Two of the White Boy Trilogy is the sixth solo studio album by American rapper Haystak. It was released on July 26, 2005, through 40 West Records. The album features guest appearances from 8Ball and Bun B.

== Track listing ==
1. "Big Ass White Boy" - 3:47
2. "We Roll" - 4:22
3. "I Ain't No Pin-Up" - 5:15
4. "All By Myself" - 4:17
5. "Boo Hoo Hoo" (featuring Bun B) - 4:05
6. "Keep It Southern" - 4:32
7. "Bonnie and Clyde" - 4:35
8. "Kick They Back In" (featuring 8Ball) - 4:29
9. "Bang Bang" - 4:11
10. "U Hard" - 3:51
11. "My Friend" - 4:45
12. "Whiteboy" - 4:18
13. "Mama" - 4:17
14. "Be Strong" - 4:23
15. "Rollin' With Me" - 4:47
16. "Middle of Nowhere" - 4:26

== Charts ==
Chart (2005)	Peak position
US Top R&B/Hip-Hop Albums (Billboard)	92
