= Heat It Up =

Single by Bubba Sparxxx

from the album The Charm
- Released: May 25, 2006
- Recorded: 2005
- Genre: Hip hop, Southern hip hop
- Length: 3:44
- Label: Purple Ribbon Records/Virgin Records
- Songwriters: Solomon Anderson; Michael Antoine Crooms; Warren Anderson Mathis
- Producer: Mr. Collipark

Bubba Sparxxx singles chronology
"Ms. New Booty" (2005)	"Heat It Up" (2006)	"Beatin Down the Block" (2009)

"Heat It Up" is the second single from Bubba Sparxxx's third full-length album The Charm (2006). It was produced by Mr Collipark. The song garnered a negative reception from critics. "Heat It Up" had less chart success than its predecessor "Ms. New Booty", peaking at numbers 24 and 57 on the Billboard Hot Rap Songs and Hot R&B/Hip-Hop Songs charts respectively.

== Critical reception ==
"Heat It Up" received generally negative reviews from music critics. Steve 'Flash' Juon of RapReviews criticized the song for having production that's generic and simplistic sounding, and Bubba for delivering dull brag rap. Peter Relic of Rolling Stone found the song just as ineffective as the other Collipark-produced song "Ms. New Booty", calling it "even more unimpressive than the first."

== Live performance ==
Bubba performed "Heat It Up" with Mr. Collipark on Last Call with Carson Daly on August 3, 2006.

== Charts ==
Chart (2006)	Peak position
U.S. Billboard Bubbling Under Hot 100 Singles	3
US Hot R&B/Hip-Hop Songs (Billboard)	57
US Hot Rap Songs (Billboard)	24
US Rhythmic Airplay (Billboard)	20
