= Pain Management (album) =

Studio album by Bubba Sparxxx
- Released: October 15, 2013
- Recorded: 2011–13
- Genre: Hip hop; country rap
- Length: 45:04
- Label: Average Joes; Backroad
- Producer: Dan Rockett; Shannon "Fat Shan" Houchins; Phivestarr Productions; Mike Hartnett; Noah Gordon; Les Hall; Jody Stevens

Bubba Sparxxx chronology
The Charm (2006)	Pain Management (2013)	Made on McCosh Mill Road (2014)

Singles from Pain Management
- 1. "Country Folks" Released: October 9, 2012; 2. "Splinter" Released: January 16, 2013

Pain Management is the fourth studio album by the American rapper Bubba Sparxxx. It was released on October 15, 2013, by Average Joes Entertainment and Backroad Records. It was his first album in seven years and has guest appearances by Colt Ford, Rodney Atkins, Danny Boone, Dan Rockett, Crucifix, Dirt Reynolds, Daniel Lee and The Lacs. This is his first album to not have production by Timbaland

== Track listing ==
No.	Title	Producer(s)	Length
1.	"Bangin'" (featuring Dan Rockett)	Dan Rockett	4:15
2.	"Country Folks" (featuring Danny Boone & Colt Ford)	Shannon "Fat Shan" Houchins	3:33
3.	"Ride Out Of Town"	Dan Rocket; Les Hall	3:52
4.	"Splinter" (featuring Crucifix)	Phivestarr Productions	4:28
5.	"Hairdresser Hot" (featuring The Lacs)	Phivestarr Productions	4:14
6.	"Right" (featuring Rodney Atkins)	Shannon "Fat Shan" Houchins; Mike Hartnett; Noah Gordon	3:17
7.	"Getcha a Pull" (featuring Dirt Reynolds)	Shannon "Fat Shan" Houchins; Mike Hartnett; Noah Gordon	4:23
8.	"LaGrange" (featuring Dan Rockett)	Dan Rocket; Les Hall	3:53
9.	"Down Yonder" (featuring I4NI)	Jody Stevens	4:02
10.	"Devil's Fire" (featuring Daniel Lee)	Dan Rockett	4:10
11.	"Wicked World" (featuring Dan Rockett)	Dan Rockett	4:57
Total length:			45:04

== Chart performance ==
Chart (2013)	Peak position
US Top Country Albums (Billboard)	40
