= Strictly Business (Haystak & Jelly Roll album) =

Studio album by Haystak & JellyRoll
- Released: December 3, 2011
- Genre: Southern hip-hop
- Length: 76:27

Haystak & JellyRoll chronology
| Easy 2 Hate (2010) | Strictly Business (2011) | Business As Usual (2013) |

Strictly Business is a full-length collaboration album released by Haystak and JellyRoll on December 3, 2011. The collaboration album peaked at 67 on the Billboard R&B/Hip-Hop Albums chart and 16 on the Heatseekers Albums chart.

== Track listing ==
1. "I'm Tryin'" - 3:49
2. "Where Was You?" - 3:44
3. "That's All I Know" - 4:21
4. "Far Away" - 3:56
5. "Squad Up" - 3:19
6. "Nothing Free" - 3:22
7. "Back of That Cadillac" - 2:54
8. "1, 2, 3, 4" - 2:38
9. "Time Gon Come" - 2:50
10. "Clear My Mind" - 4:26
11. "Sex Appeal" - 3:32
12. "We on It" - 4:07
13. "Put My City On" - 4:11
14. "We Dem White Boys" - 3:58
15. "Pass That" - 3:47
16. "Leavin' You For Dead" - 4:55
17. "Ohhh Lord" - 3:51
18. "Hustlin' featuring Big Snap" - 3:34
19. "Feelin' Myself" - 4:17
20. "Don't Add Nothing" - 4:56
21. "Gettin' Money" (Bonus Track) - 4:15
