= The Natural II =

Studio album by Haystak
- Released: May 12, 2009
- Recorded: 2009
- Genre: Hip-hop
- Label: Real Talk Entertainment
- Producer: Big Hollis, Vince V.

Haystak chronology
Cracks The Safe (2008)	The Natural II (2009)	Came A Long Way (2009)

The Natural II is the ninth studio album by rapper Haystak. It was released on May 12, 2009. The album peaked on the Billboard 200 R&B/Hip-Hop Albums at 47, 42 on the Independent Albums, and 20 on the Rap Albums.

1. Times Is Tight
2. Old Money
3. Goons Involved
4. Listen Up
5. S.T.A.K
6. Throwed Off
7. Mash On A Small Timer
8. I'm So Blessed
9. My Mistress
10. Why We Gotta Live Like This
11. It's Ok
12. Don't Care
13. Fallin Warriors
14. In These Streets
