= Easy 2 Hate =

Studio album by Haystak
- Released: November 30, 2010
- Genre: Rap, Southern rap
- Length: 134:45

Haystak chronology
Came Along Way (2009)	Easy 2 Hate (2010)	Strictly Business (2011)

Easy 2 Hate is a full-length 2-disc album released by Haystak on November 30, 2010. The album peaked at 68 on the Billboard Top R&B/Hip-Hop Albums chart, and 12 on the Heatseekers Albums chart.

== Track listing ==
Disc 1

1. "Been A Long Time" - 3:33
2. "My People An Em'" - 4:22
3. "King Round Here" - 4:51
4. "Everybody Eats" - 3:48
5. "Swag" - 4:42
6. "Big White Whirlwind" - 4:13
7. "I Be Listenin'" - 4:28
8. "Blastville, Pt. 2" - 4:29
9. "Ya Best Bet" - 4:20
10. "Those People" - 4:24
11. "Confrontational" - 4:09
12. "See Me In The Streets" - 4:49
13. "Flag Folded" - 4:23
14. "They Ain't Sayin' Nothin'" - 3:17
15. "Fuck Up And Find Out" - 4:04

Disc 2

1. "Good To The Game" - 2:43
2. "One Time" - 5:16
3. "My Baby" - 5:47
4. "More Like Our Children" - 4:49
5. "Funny Bout You" - 4:18
6. "Too Much Love" - 5:47
7. "Please Baby" - 4:23
8. "Silver Spoon" - 5:10
9. "So What?" - 4:31
10. "Stop Talkin'" - 4:17
11. "Keep Bubblin'" - 4:13
12. "Worst Case Scenario" - 4:19
13. "Bottom Brawd" - 4:30
14. "The Band Played On" - 4:47
15. "Beginnin' Of An Era" - 6:03
