= Hard 2 Love (Haystak album) =

Studio album by Haystak
- Released: August 26, 2008
- Genres: Rap, Southern rap
- Label: Select-O-Hits

Haystak chronology
B.O.S.S Mixtape Volume 1 (2007)	Hard 2 Love (2008)	Cracks the Safe (2008)

Hard 2 Love is the eighth album released by Haystak. It was issued on August 26, 2008. Easy 2 Hate was released on November 30, 2010 as a sequel to Hard 2 Love. This album peaked on the Billboard 200 R&B/Hip-Hop Albums at 28, 13 on the Heatseekers Albums, 41 on the Independent Albums, and 15 on the Rap Albums.

== Track listing ==
1. "The White Boys Back" - 4:27
2. "Say Sump'n" - 3:33
3. "My Space" - 4:08
4. "Plottin' On A Bakery" - 3:52
5. "Titanic" - 4:46
6. "B.O.S.S (Boy Observe Somethin' Serious" - 4:01
7. "Not The One" - 3:49
8. "Blastville" - 4:36
9. "South Side" - 4:29
10. "R.I.P Pimp C" - 4:51
11. "For The Rats" - 4:38
12. "Hard 2 Love" - 5:05
13. "Comin' With Me" - 4:28
14. "You Go Do You" - 4:27
15. "Boss Man" - 4:29 Produced by Mr.Giggles
16. "I Do It For You" - 4:32
