= Ms. New Booty =

Single by Bubba Sparxxx featuring Ying Yang Twins and Mr. Collipark

from the album The Charm
- Released: November 29, 2005
- Recorded: 2005
- Genre: Crunk
- Length: 4:41 (album version); 3:20 (radio edit)
- Label: Purple Ribbon; Virgin
- Songwriters: Michael Crooms; Deongelo Holmes; Eric Jackson; Warren Anderson Mathis
- Producer: Mr. Collipark

Bubba Sparxxx singles chronology
"Back in the Mud" (2003)	"Ms. New Booty" (2005)	"Heat It Up" (2006)

Ying Yang Twins singles chronology
"Bedroom Boom" (2005)	"Ms. New Booty" (2005)	"Git It" (2006)

Music video
- "Ms. New Booty" on YouTube

"Ms. New Booty" is a hip hop song by American rapper Bubba Sparxxx. It features the Ying Yang Twins singing the song's middle verses and Mr. Collipark, who provided the production. It also interpolates elements of "Wait (The Whisper Song)". It was the first single released from his third album The Charm (2006).

"Ms. New Booty" garnered a mixed reception from critics who were divided by Bubba's choice in changing his production and lyrical content towards more mainstream fare. The song peaked at number 7 on the Billboard Hot 100, giving Bubba his highest-charting single to date on that chart. It also peaked at numbers 3, 7 and 9 on the Hot Rap Songs, Hot R&B/Hip-Hop Songs and Mainstream Top 40 charts respectively. The song was certified Gold by the Recording Industry Association of America (RIAA), denoting sales of over half-a-million units in that country.

The music video (directed by Marcus Raboy) features Bryan Callen and Bubba Sparxxx as the hosts of an infomercial.

== Critical reception ==
"Ms. New Booty" received generally mixed reviews from music critics who questioned Bubba's decision to deliver a cliché mainstream hip-hop track.

Mike Diver of Drowned in Sound said that despite the inclusion of the Ying Yang Twins, the song doesn't steer away from Bubba's laidback flow of sexual content over dance-worthy production. Nathan Rabin of The A.V. Club found the female glorification vibe of the song tolerable because of Bubba's sensible flow, saying that "he retains a courtly formality that sets him apart." Steve 'Flash' Juon of RapReviews said that the production and Bubba's energetic flow manage to lift the song above subpar lyrics, saying that "Admittedly Bubba's not going to win any "Best Lyric Writing of 2006" awards for this song, but between him and the Ying Yang it's not hard to see who comes off like a champ."

Pitchfork writer Tom Breihan found the song's production lacking in creativity but backhandedly said that its "depressingly boring, but it's done its job, giving Bubba his biggest-ever hit." Jeff Vrabel of PopMatters found it disappointing that Bubba dwindled the talents from his first two albums to deliver an "exceedingly conservative" stripper track. Peter Relic of Rolling Stone found the song derivative of other southern hip-hop tracks, in terms of lyrical subject and production, saying that it "further suggest Sparxxx is trying to fit new rims on retreads."

== Commercial performance ==
"Ms. New Booty" debuted at number 87 on the Billboard Hot 100 for the week of February 4, 2006. Two months later, it reached the top 10, moving four spots from number 13 to 9 for the week of April 8, 2006. It peaked at number 7 for the week of May 13, 2006 and was present on the chart for a total of twenty-four weeks.

On July 14, 2006, the song was certified Gold by the RIAA for selling over 500,000 units in the United States.

== Music video ==
Directed by Marcus Raboy, the video places Bubba and actor/comedian Bryan Callen as hosts for an infomercial promoting a female-targeted product that "enhances" their butts. It cuts to Bubba giving away the product door-to-door and in places like a chapel and a library, where the product takes effect. The video also features Shay "Buckeey" Johnson of Flavor of Love and Charm School fame. Atlanta rapper Future can be seen in the background as a cameo during the tv scenes of Bubba and the Ying Yang Twins dancing with some women.

== Live performance ==
Bubba performed "Ms. New Booty" with the Ying Yang Twins on The Tonight Show with Jay Leno on April 18, 2006.

== Remix ==
The official remix features Outkast rapper Big Boi, Killer Mike, and Mr. Collipark on the intro.

== Formats and track listing ==
Europe 12"

1. "Ms. New Booty" (radio edit) – 4:10
2. "Ms. New Booty" (album instrumental) – 4:37
3. "Ms. New Booty" (explicit edit) – 4:11
4. "Ms. New Booty" (explicit a cappella) – 4:11

Europe CD (Promo)

1. "Ms. New Booty" (radio edit) – 4:10
2. "Ms. New Booty" (explicit edit) – 4:11
3. "Ms. New Booty" (album instrumental) – 4:37
4. "Ms. New Booty" (explicit a cappella) – 4:11

US 12" (Promo)

1. "Ms. New Booty" (radio edit) – 4:10
2. "Ms. New Booty" (album instrumental) – 4:37
3. "Ms. New Booty" (explicit edit) – 4:11
4. "Ms. New Booty" (explicit a cappella) – 4:11

US CD (Promo)

1. "Ms. New Booty" (radio edit) – 4:10
2. "Ms. New Booty" (explicit edit) – 4:11
3. "Ms. New Booty" (album instrumental) – 4:37
4. "Ms. New Booty" (explicit a cappella) – 4:11

US digital download

1. "Ms. New Booty" – 4:12

== Charts and certifications ==
=== Weekly charts ===
Weekly chart performance for "Ms. New Booty"
Chart (2005–2006)	Peak position
Canada CHR/Pop Top 40 (Radio & Records)	9
Netherlands (Single Top 100)	84
New Zealand (Recorded Music NZ)	22
US Billboard Hot 100	7
US Pop Airplay (Billboard)	9
US Hot R&B/Hip-Hop Songs (Billboard)	7
US Hot Rap Songs (Billboard)	3
US Rhythmic Airplay (Billboard)	3

=== Year-end charts ===
Year-end chart performance for "Ms. New Booty"
Chart (2006)	Position
US Billboard Hot 100	36
US Hot R&B/Hip-Hop Songs (Billboard)	50
US Hot Rap Songs (Billboard)	12
US Rhythmic (Billboard)	11

=== Certifications ===
Certifications for "Ms. New Booty"
Region	Certification	Certified units/sales
Canada (Music Canada) Ringtone	Gold	20,000^{*}
New Zealand (RMNZ)	Gold	15,000^{‡}
United States (RIAA)	2× Platinum	2,000,000^{‡}
United States (RIAA) Mastertone	Gold	500,000^{*}
^{*} Sales figures based on certification alone.^{‡} Sales+streaming figures based on certification alone.
