= Haystak =

American rapper (born 1973)

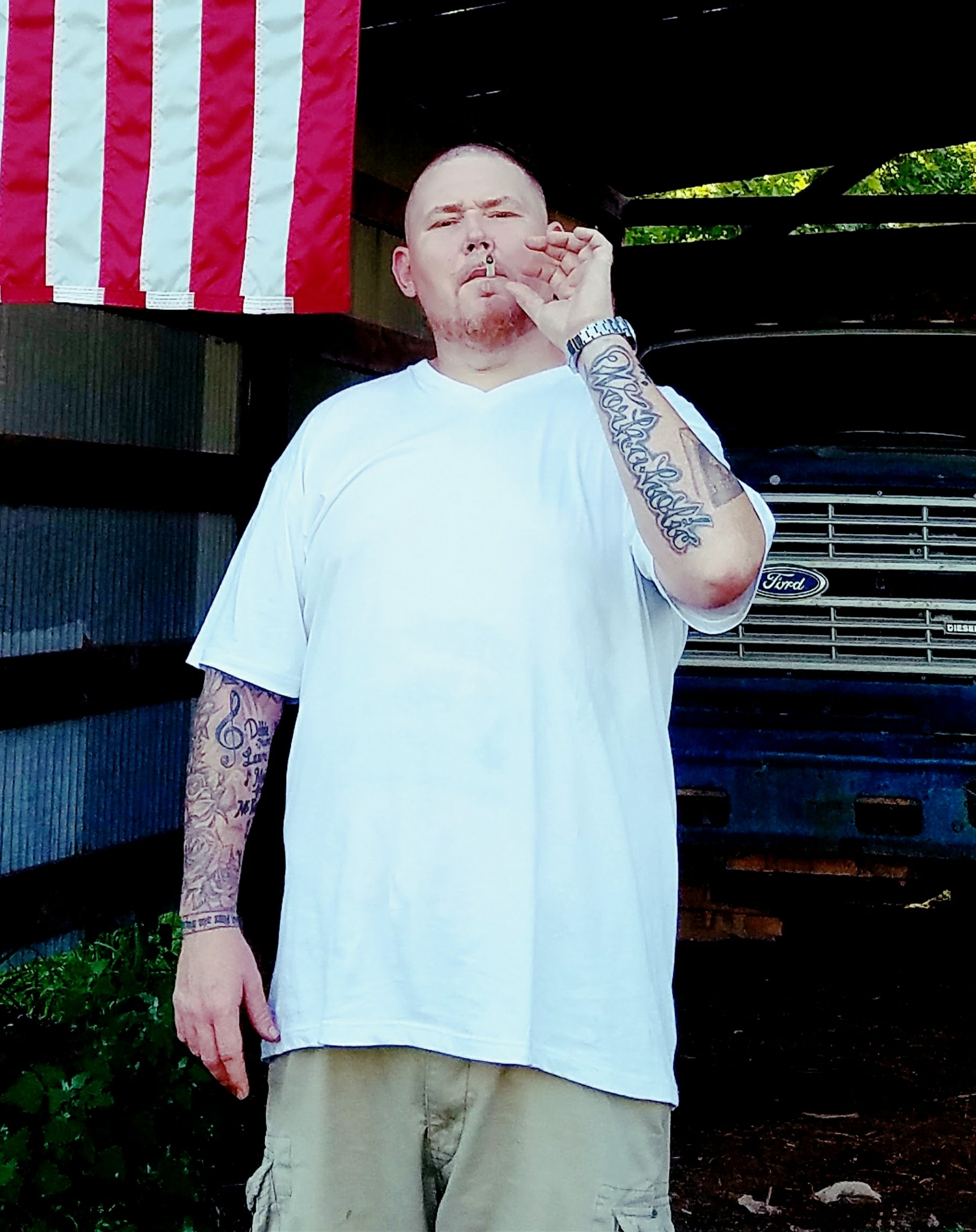
- Haystak Mak Million

Background information
- Also known as: Mak Million
- Born: Jason Winfree; March 22, 1973 (age 53); Lebanon, Tennessee, U.S.
- Origin: Nashville, Tennessee, U.S.
- Genre: Southern hip hop
- Occupation: Rapper
- Years active: 1995–present
- Labels: Street Flavor Records; Def Jam; Koch Records; 40 West Records; Haystak, Inc.; RhymeSick; War Horse Entertainment; (current)

Jason Winfree (born March 22, 1973), professionally known by his stage name Haystak is an American rapper from Nashville, Tennessee.

== Early life ==
Jason Winfree was born to teenage parents in Trenton, Tennessee, outside of Nashville and was raised by his grandparents. At the age of 15, he was arrested and convicted for bringing Valium and cocaine to school. He served two years and, when he was released, began a music career. He rapped about his life as so-called "white trash", exploring the social dimensions of being white and underprivileged in the South.

== Career ==
In the late 1990s, he signed with a local rap label, Street Flavor, and began a business relationship with producers Kevin Grisham and Sonny Paradise. The partnership resulted in Mak Million, Haystak's 1998 debut album, followed two years later by Car Fulla White Boys. By this point, Haystak had garnered a substantial regional following, and underground hardcore rap publication Murder Dog began promoting his work. The attention attracted the label Koch Records who signed Haystak and re-released Car Fulla White Boys in late summer 2000. Two years later, Koch released Haystak's third album, The Natural.

Haystak released his latest solo album entitled Easy 2 Hate on November 30, 2010 through Haystak, Inc.

Haystak is divorced and has two children. In addition to rap music, he has been featured on film Hustle & Flow where he played the DJ named Mickey.

Haystak collaborated with fellow Nashville native JellyRoll on the albums Strictly Business in 2011 and its sequel Business As Usual in 2013.

Since March 2017, Haystak has been partnered with Daphne McCool and Russell Duke who have rebuilt his brand and have contributed to his continued success.

In June 2018, Statik G signed Haystak to his record label RhymeSick for a 5 year deal and immediately booked several national tours for the rest of the year into 2019.

== Legal issues ==
In 2004, Haystack was charged with statutory rape. In 2006, Haystak was charged and convicted of sexual assault. He was sentenced to 11 months and 29 days of supervised probation. In May 2014, he was arrested on domestic violence charges. In December 2014, he was arrested for intent to commit sexual abuse during a concert in Iowa.

== Discography ==
=== Studio albums ===
List of studio albums, with selected chart positions
Title	Studio album details	Peak chart positions				
Title	Studio album details	US	US R&B	US Rap	US Indie	US Heat.
Mak Million	Released: September 15, 1998; Label: Street Flavor	—	—	—	—	—
Car Fulla White Boys	Released: July 20, 2000; Label: Street Flavor/Koch	—	—	—	—	—
The Natural	Released: July 23, 2002; Label: Street Flavor/Koch	164	31	—	13	6
Return of the Mak Million	Released: October 29, 2002; Label: Street Flavor	—	—	—	—	—
Portrait of a White Boy	Released: October 19, 2004; Label: 40 West Records/Street Flavor	—	—	—	—	—
From Start to Finish	Released: July 26, 2005; Label: 40 West Records	—	92	—	—	—
The New South	Released: September 19, 2005; Label: Hardwax Australia/Central Station	—	—	—	—	—
The SouthWest Connection (with Lexx Luger & Dutch the Great)	Released: April 4, 2006; Label: Paid In Full/Koch	—	—	—	—	—
Crackavelli	Released: March 20, 2007; Label: 40 West Records/Street Flavor	186	38	19	24	7
Hard 2 Love	Released: August 26, 2008; Label: Merge Entertainment	—	28	15	41	13
Cracks the Safe	Released: September 2, 2008; Label: Siccness.net	—	66	—	—	—
The Natural II	Released: May 12, 2009; Label: Real Talk Entertainment	—	47	20	42	—
Came a Long Way	Released: July 21, 2009; Label: Street Flavor	—	39	16	—	22
Easy 2 Hate	Released: November 30, 2010; Label: Haystak Inc.	—	68	—	—	12
Strictly Business (with JellyRoll)	Released: December 3, 2011; Label: Haystak Inc.	—	67	—	—	16
Business As Usual (with JellyRoll)	Released: November 19, 2013; Label: Haystak Inc.	—	42	—	—	11
Walking Tall	Released: April 8, 2014; Label: Global Alliance Entertainment	—	—	—	—	—
Still Standing	Released: February 2, 2016; Label: PinayPounder Records	—	—	—	—	—

=== Mixtapes ===
List of mixtapes, with selected details
Title	Mixtape details
Street Flavor (with Charlie P & Jelly Roll)	Released: 2006; Label: Street Flavor Records; Format: CD, digital download, streaming
B.O.S.S. The Mixtape Volume 1	Released: October 16, 2007; Label: Merge Entertainment; Format: CD, digital download, streaming
B-Side Bangerz	Released: March 4, 2016; Label: PinayPounder Records; Format: CD, digital download, streaming
The Basement Tapes	Released: December 16, 2016; Label: PStreet Flavor Records/Memphis International Records; Format: CD, digital download, streaming
Broken	Released: 2018; Label: Brabo Gator Music; Format: Digital download, streaming
Haywire	Released: February 18, 2022; Label: War Horse Entertainment; Format: CD, digital download, streaming

=== Extended plays ===
List of EPs, with selected details
Title	MEP details
Desensitized	Released: December 2020; Label: Black Fly Music; Format: CD, digital download, streaming
