= Pimp C discography =

This is the discography of Pimp C, an American rapper, and one half of Southern hip hop group UGK, along with Bun B.

== Albums ==
=== Studio albums ===
Title	Release	Peak chart positions			Certifications
Title	Release	US	US R&B	US Rap	Certifications
The Sweet James Jones Stories	Released: March 2, 2005; Label: Rap-A-Lot, Asylum, Atlantic	50	7	3	
Pimpalation	Released: July 11, 2006; Label: Rap-A-Lot, Asylum, Atlantic	3	1	1	RIAA: Gold

=== Posthumous studio albums ===
Title	Release	Peak chart positions		
Title	Release	US	US R&B	US Rap
The Naked Soul of Sweet Jones	Released: October 5, 2010; Label: Rap-A-Lot, Geffen	25	8	5
Still Pimping	Released: July 12, 2011; Label: Rap-A-Lot, Universal Motown	72	15	8
Long Live the Pimp	Released: December 4, 2015; Label: Mass Appeal	96	17	11

=== Compilation albums ===
Title	Release	Peak chart positions	
Title	Release	US R&B /HH	US Rap
Greatest Hits	Released: June 3, 2008; Label: Asylum, Warner Bros.	24	8

== Singles ==
=== As lead artist ===
Title	Year	Peak chart positions		Album
Title	Year	US	US Rap	Album
"I'sa Playa" (featuring Bun B, Twista, and Z-Ro)	2005	105	—	Sweet James Jones Stories
"I'm Free"	2006	—	12	Pimpalation
"Pourin' Up" (featuring Mike Jones and Bun B)	2006	103	—	Pimpalation
"Knockin' Doorz Down" (featuring P.O.P. and Lil' Keke)	2006	108	—	Pimpalation
"3 Way Freak" (featuring Lil Wayne)	2015	—	—	Long Live the Pimp

=== As featured artist ===
Title	Year	Peak chart positions			Album
Title	Year	US	US R&B	US Rap	Album
"I Miss My Homies" (Master P featuring Silkk the Shocker and Pimp C)	1997	25	16	2	Ghetto D
"Get Throwed" (Bun B featuring Jay-Z, Pimp C, Z-Ro, and Young Jeezy)	2006	—	49	24	Trill
"Swang" (Trae featuring Pimp C, Fat Pat and Big Hawk)	2006	—	—	—	Restless
"Love Song" (Missez featuring Pimp C)	2006	—	53	—	Non-album singles
"D-Girl (DopeGirl)" (Brooke Valentine featuring Pimp C)	2006	—	92	—	Non-album singles
"—" denotes a recording that did not chart.

== Other charted songs ==
Title	Release	Peak chart positions			Album
Title	Release	US	US R&B	US Rap	Album
"Faithful" (Drake featuring Pimp C and Dvsn)	2016	72	36	19	Views

== Guest appearances ==
Title	Year	Artist(s)	Album
"Havin’ Thangs"	1994	Big Mike	Somethin' Serious
"Watcha Gon Do?"	1995	X-Mob	Ghetto Mail
"I’m Satisfied"	1995	Kottonmouth	100% Kottonmouth
"Release Me "	1995	Kilo	The Bloody City
"Rule #1"	1997	MC Breed	Flatline
"Candy (The Percy Mack Mix)"	1997	DJ DMD	Eleven
"Blind and Can't See"	1997	Sho	The Return
"Mob Or Die"	1997	X-Mob	Paper Chasing
"Good Times"	1997	X-Mob	Paper Chasing
"Creepin"	1997	CC Waterbound	Critical Condition
"All About It"	1998	Too Short	Nationwide: Independence Day
"The Trill Connection"	1998	DJ DMD, Lee Masta	Twenty-Two: P.A. World Wide
"20 Inches & 4 Nickels"	1998	Baby Drew	The Hand That Rocks the Cradle
"Feel My Choppa"	1998	Mafioso Click	Feel My Choppa
"Get Crunk"	1999	Crooked Lettaz	Grey Skies
"Mrs. Good Pussy"	1999	Lil Sin	Undaconstruction
"Top Notch Hoes"	1999	3re Tha Hardaway	Who Got Yo Back
"Mr. Playa Hata"	2000	Big Boom, Big Moe	Paperchase 2000
"Cop Yo Drop"	2000	Lil Derrick aka Bulletproof	Smoked Outt Records: Done Did It
"No Cheese"	2000	Mafia Style	Unpredictable, Vol. 1
"Thug Thang Y2G"	2000	Spice 1, Black C	The Last Dance
"Doin the Fool"	2000	E-40, Too Short, Pastor Troy, Al Kapone	Loyalty and Betrayal
"Freaky Deaky"	2000	Willie D, Nay Nay	Loved by Few, Hated by Many
"The Trill Connection II (Breakin Ni**az Off)"	2001	DJ DMD	Thirty-Three: Live From Hiroshima
"4's Recline Top"	2001	Big Moe, Dirty $, D-Gotti	Da Wreckshop Family: Ack'n A Azz
"Texas Boys"	2001	Kiotti, Mr. 3-2	Jag in The Jungle
"Pay My Bitch"	2001	MDDL FNGZ	Live! From Da Manjah
"Down South Nigga Fa Life"	2001	The Congregation	Ghetto Raised
"You Ain't Gonna Be Down"	2001	Silky Slim	Ole Superstar
"Quit Hatin’ Pt. 2"	2002	Too $hort, Lil Jon & The East Side Boyz	What's My Favorite Word?
"Cash"	2002	Big Moe, D-Wreck	Purple World
"Slow Down"	2002	Vicious, Corey Mac AKA Corey Mo	I Ball Like Kobe
"Bitch N*gga"	2002	E600	Texas Boys Soundtrack
"Like a Pimp (Remix)"	2003	Three 6 Mafia, Project Pat	Da Unbreakables
"Time to Ball"	2003	Sambow	Heavy Hitta
"Diamonds On"	2004	Boss Pimps	Pimpin' Off Top
"Like That (Remix)"	2005	Webbie, Lil' Boosie	Savage Life
"Get Up on It/ Can't Get No Lower(12")"	2006	Bone Crusher, Too $hort, Chamillionaire	—N/a
"I'm 'n Luv (wit a Stripper) (Remix)"	2006	T-Pain, Twista, Paul Wall, R. Kelly, MJG, Too $hort	Rappa Ternt Sanga
"Make It Home"	2006	Young Buck, 615	Welcome To The Traphouse
"Cause I'm a Playa"	2006	Project Pat	Crook by da Book: The Fed Story
"Pimp Hard"	2006	Scarface, Juvenile, Z-Ro, Petey Pablo	My Homies Part 2
"White Gurl"	2006	E-40, Juelz Santana, Bun B	My Ghetto Report Card
"Caught Up"	2006	Xxzotic	—N/a
"4 Corner"	2006	Bow Wow, Lil Scrappy, Lil Wayne, Short Dawg	The Price of Fame
"Money Maker"	2006	Too $hort, Rick Ross	Blow the Whistle
"Do Your Time"	2006	Ludacris, Beanie Sigel, C-Murder	Release Therapy
"Fuck You"	2006	Lil Boosie, Webbie	Bad Azz
"Gettin' Some (Remix)"	2006	Shawnna, Rick Ross, Busta Rhymes	Worth Tha Weight, Part 2: The Mixtape
"Holla at Botany"	2006	C-Note,	Network'N
"Dat Good"	2006	Mr. Marcelo, Prince Bugsy	Son of Magnolia
"Wipe Me Down(Remix #2)	2007	Lil Boosie, Webbie, Foxx, Trill Fam	Trill Entertainment Presents: Survival of the Fittest
"Whatchu Gonna Do"	2007	8Ball & MJG	Ridin High
"Go 2 War"	2007	Crime Mob, Lil' Scrappy	Hated On Mostly
"Talkin' Smart"	2007	Project Pat	Walkin' Bank Roll
"4 Kings"/"I Know You Want Me"(Remix)	2007	Young Buck, Young Jeezy, T.I., Jazze Pha	Buck the World
"Murder'ra"	2007	Z-Ro, Spice 1, Vicious	King of tha Ghetto: Power
"Hood"	2007	Ali & Gipp, Nelly	Kinfolk
"Cut it Out"	2007	Nelly, Sean P	none
"Welcome to the South"	2007	Chamillionaire	Ultimate Victory
"Stack Money"	2007	G Kamp	Against All Odds
"Knuckle Up"	2007	Ice Water, Raekwon, Hands	Polluted Water
"I Know Why"	2007	Gucci Mane, Rich Boy, Blaze-1	Back to the Trap House
"I Got"	2008	Three 6 Mafia, Project Pat	Last 2 Walk
"Underground Thang"	2008	Bun B, Chamillionaire	II Trill
"Fly As An Eagle"	2008	Webbie, Foxx	Savage Life 2
"Suicide Doors"	2008	David Banner, Kandi	The Greatest Story Ever Told
"Top Notch"	2008	Z-Ro	Crack
"Leanin'"	2009	Slim Thug, Bun B	Boss of All Bosses
"Welcome 2 Houston"	2009	Slim Thug, Chamillionaire, Mike Jones, Bun B, Paul Wall, Yung Redd, Lil' Keke, Z-Ro, Mike D, Big Pokey, Rob G, Trae, Lil' O	Boss of All Bosses
"Right Now"	2010	Bun B, 2Pac, Trey Songz	Trill OG
"Swerve 2"	2010	Lil Boosie, Webbie, Bun B (as V12 Boyz)	Golden Child V
"Pimp"	2012	T.I., Too Short	Fuck da City Up
"Gossip"	2012	Big Boi, Bun B, Big K.R.I.T.	Vicious Lies and Dangerous Rumors
"Worldwide (OG Remix)"	2013	EDIDON, Makaveli, 8Ball, Lloyd	O.G. Est. 1992
"Show Out (Remix)"	2013	Juicy J, T.I.	none
"Smokin' Rollin'"	2013	Juicy J	Stay Trippy
"Cake"	2013	Bun B, Big K.R.I.T., Lil Boosie	Trill OG: The Epilogue
"Don't Play With Me"	2013	Bun B	Trill OG: The Epilogue
"Word On The Town"	2014	Wiz Khalifa, Juicy J	28 Grams & Blacc Hollywood
"Wavybone"	2015	A$AP Rocky, Juicy J, Bun B	At.Long.Last.A$AP
"Faithful"	2016	Drake, dvsn	Views
"In The South"	2017	Big Boi, Gucci Mane	Boomiverse
"

== Music videos ==
Title	Release	Director
"Pourin' Up"	2006	Mr. Boomtown
"Knockin' Doorz Down"	2007	Benny Matthews

== Documentaries ==
Title	Release	Director
"Pimpalation - Return of the Trill"	2006	REL Entertainment, LLC
"The Final Chapter"	2008	REL Entertainment
