= UGK discography =

- Studio albums: 6
- Extended plays: 2
- Compilation albums: 4

This is the discography of UGK, an American hip-hop duo from Port Arthur, Texas.

== Albums ==
=== Studio albums ===
Title	Album details	Peak chart positions		Certifications
Title	Album details	US	US R&B	Certifications
Too Hard to Swallow	Released: November 10, 1992; Label: Jive; Format: CD, LP, cassette, digital download	—	37	
Super Tight	Released: August 30, 1994; Label: Jive; Format: CD, LP, cassette, digital download	95	9	
Ridin' Dirty	Released: July 30, 1996; Label: Jive; Format: CD, LP, cassette, digital download	15	2	RIAA: Gold
Dirty Money	Released: November 13, 2001; Label: Jive; Format: CD, LP, cassette, digital download	18	2	
Underground Kingz	Released: August 7, 2007; Label: Jive; Format: CD, LP, digital download	1	1	
UGK 4 Life	Released: March 31, 2009; Label: Jive; Format: CD, digital download	6	2	

=== Compilation albums ===
Title	Album details
Side Hustles	Released: 2002; Label: Jive; Format: CD, cassette
Best of UGK	Released: 2003; Label: Jive; Format: CD, cassette
Chopped & Screwed	Released: 2004; Label: Jive; Format: CD
The Essential UGK	Released: 2014; Label: Jive; Format: Digital download

== Extended plays ==
Title	EP details
The Southern Way	Released: April 26, 1992; Label: Big Tyme; Format: Cassette
Banned	Released: August 1, 1992; Label: Big Tyme; Format: CD, cassette

== Singles ==
=== As lead artist ===
Title	Release	Peak chart positions			Album
Title	Release	US	US R&B	US Rap	Album
"Something Good"	1992	—	105	—	Too Hard to Swallow
"Use Me Up"	1993	—	—	—	Too Hard to Swallow
"Pocket Full of Stones"	1993	—	—	—	Too Hard to Swallow
"It's Supposed to Bubble"	1994	—	—	—	Super Tight
"Front, Back, Side to Side"	1994	—	—	48	Super Tight / A Low Down Dirty Shame (soundtrack)
"One Day"	1996	—	—	—	Ridin' Dirty
"Belts to Match"	1999	—	—	—	Dirty Money
"Take It Off"	1999	—	107	—	Dirty Money
"Pimpin' Ain't No Illusion"	1999	—	74	6	Dirty Money
"Let Me See It"	2001	—	116	—	Dirty Money
"The Game Belongs to Me"	2006	—	105	—	Underground Kingz
"International Players Anthem (I Choose You)" (featuring OutKast)	2007	70	12	10	Underground Kingz
"Da Game Been Good to Me"	2009	—	84	—	UGK 4 Life
"—" denotes a recording that did not chart or was not released in that territory.

=== As featured artist ===
Title	Release	Peak chart positions				Album
Title	Release	US	US R&B	US Rap	UK	Album
"Big Pimpin'" (Jay-Z featuring UGK)	2000	18	6	3	29	Vol. 3... Life and Times of S. Carter
"Sippin' on Some Syrup" (Three 6 Mafia featuring UGK and Project Pat)	2000	113	30	—	—	When the Smoke Clears: Sixty 6, Sixty 1
"Front Back" (T.I. featuring UGK)	2006	111	111	—	—	King
"Chunk Up the Deuce" (Lil' Keke featuring Paul Wall and UGK)	2006	—	63	—	—	Non-album single
"—" denotes a recording that did not chart or was not released in that territory.

== Guest appearances ==
Release	Title	Performer(s)	Album
1992	"Cut U N 1/2"	Point Blank feat. UGK	Prone To Bad Dreams
1993	"Pocket Full of Stones (Port Arthur Remix)"	—N/a	Menace II Society (soundtrack)
1995	"Swing Wide"	5th Ward Boyz feat. UGK	Rated G
1995	"Playaz from the South"	Master P, Silkk The Shocker feat. UGK	Down South Hustlers: Bouncin' and Swingin'
1996	"Live Wire"	Keith Murray, Lord Jamar, UGK	Don't Be a Menace to South Central While Drinking Your Juice in the Hood (soundtrack)
1996	"Break 'Em Off Somethin'"	Master P feat. UGK	Ice Cream Man
1997	"Meal Ticket"	Master P, UGK, Eightball & MJG	I'm Bout It (soundtrack)
1997	"It's Alright"	Too Short & UGK	Dangerous Ground (soundtrack)
1997	"I'm Com'n"	Hot Boys feat. UGK & Bun B	Get It How U Live!
1997	"Like Yesterday"	PSK-13 feat. UGK	Born Bad?
1997	"The Game Ain't Rated"	A-Dam-Shame feat. UGK & Too Short	Revelations: The Beginning Of The End
1997	"You Wanna Ride"	Mr. 3-2 feat. UGK	The Wicked Buddah Baby
1998	"2-Real"	Scarface feat. Mr. 3-2, UGK & F.L.A.J.	My Homies
1998	"Ackickdoe!"	C-Murder feat. Master P & UGK	Life or Death
1998	"Slangin"	Fiend feat. UGK	There's One in Every Family
1998	"Pop the Trunk"	Celly Cel feat. UGK	The G Filez
1998	"Free"	Lil Sin feat. UGK	Who Got Yo Back
1999	"Belts to Match"	Smitty, SONJI, UGK	The Wood (soundtrack)
1999	"The Corruptor's Execution"	UGK, E-40, B-Legit	The Corruptor (soundtrack)
1999	"Down Here"	One Gud Cide feat. UGK	Contradictions
1999	"Who's Snitching"	Lil' O feat. UGK	Blood Money
2000	"Murder Man Dance"	Spice 1 feat. UGK	The Last Dance
2000	"Tough Guy"	Outkast, UGK	Shaft (soundtrack)
2000	"Stick 'Em Up"	Ludacris feat. UGK	Back for the First Time
2000	"Family Affair"	—N/a	Baller Blockin' (soundtrack)
2000	"They Down with Us"	Scarface feat. UGK	The Last of a Dying Breed
2000	"Time"	Twista feat. UGK	Adrenaline Rush 2000
2000	"My Bitch"	MDDL FNGZ feat. UGK	Trouble
2000	"We Got Game"	A-Dam-Shame feat. UGK & Too Short	Dirty Game
2000	"Grippin Grain"	Ace Deuce feat. UGK	Southern Gutta Butta
2001	"Money Hoes and Power"	Jermaine Dupri feat. UGK	Instructions
2001	"Get Up Off Me"	Bo-Bo Luchiano feat. UGK	Enemy of tha MF State
2001	"What Up My Boy"	Young Smitty feat. UGK, PSK-13 & 3re Da Hardaway	Takin' Over
2001	"I Don't Owe U"	918 feat. UGK & 3re Ronnie Spencer	Reincarnated
2002	"If I Wasn't Rappin'"	Pastor Troy feat. UGK	Universal Soldier
2003	"Chewin"	Frayser Boy feat. UGK	Gone on That Bay
2004	"Get Cha Money"	Cory Mo feat. UGK	Still Payn Duez
2005	"You'z a Trick" (Remix)	Lil' Flip feat. UGK	I Need Mine
2006	"White Gurl"	E-40 feat. UGK & Juelz Santana	My Ghetto Report Card
2007	"Where's Da G's"	Dizzee Rascal feat. UGK	Maths + English
2007	"Country Cousins"	Talib Kweli feat. UGK & Raheem DeVaughn	Eardrum
2007	"Stop Playin With Yo-Self"	Bo-Bo Luchiano feat. UGK	Stop Playin With Yo-Self
2008	"On Some Chrome"	Three 6 Mafia feat. UGK	Last 2 Walk
2008	"Suicide Doors"	David Banner feat. UGK	The Greatest Story Every Told
2009	"Leanin'"	Slim Thug feat. UGK	Boss of All Bosses
2009	"Welcome 2 Houston"	Slim Thug feat. Chamillionaire, Paul Wall, Mike Jones, UGK, Lil' Keke, Z-Ro, Trae, Rob G, Lil' O, Big Pokey, Mike D & Yung Redd	Boss of All Bosses
2012	"Gossip"	Big Boi feat. UGK & Big K.R.I.T.	Vicious Lies and Dangerous Rumors
2015	"Wavybone"	A$AP Rocky feat. UGK & Juicy J	At. Long. Last. ASAP
2017	"Ride Wit Me"	Big K.R.I.T. feat. UGK	4eva Is A Mighty Long Time
2024	"Paper Together"	Megan Thee Stallion feat. UGK	Megan
