= 1992 in hip-hop =

This article summarizes the events, album releases, and album release dates in hip-hop for the year 1992.

== Released albums ==
Release date	Artist	Album
January	Sister Souljah	360 Degrees of Power
January 22	South Central Cartel	South Central Madness
January 28	Brothers Uv Da Blakmarket	Ruff Life
January 28	MC Luscious	Boom! I Got Your Boyfriend
January 28	Whistle	Get the Love
February 4	Sir Mix-a-Lot	Mack Daddy
February 4	True Culture	Rude Boys Come to Play
February 11	Lord Finesse	Return of the Funky Man
February 11	Luke	I Got Shit on My Mind
February 16	Natas	Life after Death
February 25	Boogie Down Productions	Sex and Violence
February 25	Fu-Schnickens	F.U. Don't Take It Personal
February 25	Ganksta N-I-P	The South Park Psycho
February 25	Original Flavor	This Is How It Is
February 26	Too Much Trouble	Bringing Hell on Earth
March 3	The Disposable Heroes of Hiphoprisy	Hypocrisy Is the Greatest Luxury
March 3	The A.T.E.E.M.	A Hero Ain't Nuttin' But a Sandwich
March 10	Body Count	Body Count
March 10	Da Youngsta's	Somethin 4 Da Youngsta's
March 10	Hard Knocks	School of Hard Knocks
March 15	Toddy Tee	Living on the Edge of Insanity (The Life Album)
March 17	Kyper	Countdown To The Year 2000
March 17	Ultramagnetic MCs	Funk Your Head Up
March 17	Crusaders For Real Hip-Hop	Deja Vu, It's '82
March 24	Arrested Development	3 Years, 5 Months and 2 Days in the Life Of...
March 24	Chi-Ali	The Fabulous Chi-Ali
March 27	Divine Styler	Spiral Walls Containing Autumns of Light
March 31	Kris Kross	Totally Krossed Out
April	Salt-N-Pepa	Rapped in Remixes: The Greatest Hits Remixed
April 7	College Boyz	Radio Fusion Radio
April 7	Das EFX	Dead Serious
April 7	Poison Clan	Poisonous Mentality
April 7	The Future Sound	The Whole Shabang, Vol. 1
April 7	Red Hot Lover Tone	Red Hot Lover Lover Tone
April 7	Various Artists	White Men Can't Rap (soundtrack)
April 9	Esham	Judgement Day
April 14	Spice 1	Spice 1
April 14	Various Artists	Deep Cover (soundtrack)
April 16	X-Raided	Psycho Active
April 16	Totally Insane	Direct from the Backstreet
April 20	Master P	Mama's Bad Boy
April 20	Pooh-Man	Funky As I Wanna Be
April 21	Beastie Boys	Check Your Head
April 21	Kid Frost	East Side Story
April 21	Maestro Fresh Wes	Maestro Zone
April 26	UGK	The Southern Way
April 28	Brotherhood Creed	Brotherhood Creed
April 28	Kid Sensation	The Power of Rhyme
April 28	Penthouse Players Clique	Paid the Cost
April 28	The Real Roxanne	Go Down (But Don't Bite It)
May 1	Cooly Live	Livewire
May 5	Doug E. Fresh	Doin' What I Gotta Do
May 5	Gang Starr	Daily Operation
May 7	The Click	Down and Dirty
May 12	MC Breed	20 Below
May 12	Basehead	Play with Toys
May 12	Kilo	A-Town Rush
May 12	Street Mentality	The Town I Live In
May 19	Father MC	Close to You
May 19	X Clan	Xodus
May 22	Various Artists	Class Act
June	A Tribe Called Quest	Revised Quest for the Seasoned Traveller
June 1	Prince Johnny C	It's Been a Long Rhyme Coming
June 1	Raheem	The Invincible
June 1	Seagram	The Dark Roads
June 2	Mellow Man Ace	The Brother with Two Tongues
June 2	K-Solo	Time's Up
June 9	Pete Rock & CL Smooth	Mecca and the Soul Brother
June 9	Tung Twista	Runnin' Off at da Mouth
June 9	Zhigge	Zhigge
June 11	Trinity Garden Cartel	The Ghetto My Hood
June 22	Busy Bee Starski	Thank God for Busy Bee
June 23	Eric B. & Rakim	Don't Sweat the Technique
June 23	N2Deep	Back to the Hotel
June 23	Various Artists	Mo' Money (soundtrack)
June 23	Yo-Yo	Black Pearl
June 30	MC Ren	Kizz My Black Azz
June 30	Various Artists	Boomerang (soundtrack)
July 14	Too Short	Shorty the Pimp
July 15	Fresh Kid Ice	The Chinaman
July 21	DJ Quik	Way 2 Fonky
July 21	House of Pain	House of Pain
July 28	EPMD	Business Never Personal
August 1	UGK	Banned
August 3	Brand New Heavies	Heavy Rhyme Experience, Vol. 1
August 4	The Poetess	Simply Poetry
August 4	Home team	Via Satellite From Saturn
August 11	Prince Markie Dee	Free
August 11	Double X Posse	Put Ya Boots On
August 18	Insane Poetry	Grim Reality
August 25	MC Serch	Return of the Product
September 1	Chubb Rock	I Gotta Get Mine Yo
September 4	Big Mello	Bone Hard Zaggin
September 8	Bushwick Bill	Little Big Man
September 10	JT the Bigga Figga	Don't Stop til We Major
September 14	Funky Aztecs	Chicano Blues
September 14	Tweedy Bird Loc	187 Ride By
September 15	Gerardo	Dos
September 15	Gregory D	The Real Deal
September 15	Marky Mark and the Funky Bunch	You Gotta Believe
September 15	Public Enemy	Greatest Misses
September 15	Willie D	I'm Goin' Out Lika Soldier
September 16	RBL Posse	A Lesson to Be Learned
September 18	Various Artists	South Central (soundtrack)
September 22	Da Lench Mob	Guerillas in tha Mist
September 22	Redman	Whut? Thee Album
September 22	Diamond D	Stunts, Blunts & Hip Hop
September 22	Showbiz & A.G.	Runaway Slave
September 29	Compton's Most Wanted	Music to Driveby
September 29	Lighter Shade Of Brown	Hip Hop Locos
September 30	Little Shawn	The Voice In the Mirror
October 5	Roxanne Shante	The Bitch Is Back
October 6	Common Sense	Can I Borrow a Dollar?
October 13	Various Artists	Zebrahead (soundtrack)
October 15	Bronx Style Bob	Grandma's Ghost
October 18	Insane Clown Posse	Carnival of Carnage
October 20	Grand Puba	Reel to Reel
November 3	Positive K	The Skills Dat Pay da Bills
November 3	The Goats	Tricks of the Shade
November 10	E-40	Federal
November 10	UGK	Too Hard to Swallow
November 10	O.F.T.B.	Straight Up Watts
November 17	Geto Boys	Uncut Dope: Geto Boys' Best
November 17	Ice Cube	The Predator
November 17	The Dogs	K-9 Bass
November 17	Rough House Survivers	Straight From the Soul
November 24	Various Artists	Trespass (soundtrack)
November 24	Kool G Rap & DJ Polo	Live and Let Die
November 24	Paris	Sleeping with the Enemy
November 24	The Pharcyde	Bizarre Ride II the Pharcyde
December 15	Dr. Dre	The Chronic
December 15	Eazy-E	5150: Home 4 tha Sick
December 15	Proper Dos	Mexican Power
December 22	Heavy D & the Boyz	Blue Funk
Unknown	Choice	Stick-n-Moove
Unknown	C-Funk	I'm Out 2 Stoages
Unknown	Criminal Nation	Trouble in the Hood
Unknown	Mac Dre	Back n da Hood
Unknown	A.L.T.	Another Latin Timebomb
Unknown	Grandmaster Caz	The Grandest of Them All
Unknown	Mob Style	Game of Death
Unknown	Point Blank	Prone to Bad Dreams
Unknown	Cypress Hill	Something for the Blunted (EP)
Unknown	Ghetto Girlz	Ain't Takin' No S@#t

== Highest-charting singles ==
Hip-hop singles from any year which charted in the 1992 Top 40 of the Billboard Hot 100
Song	Artist	Project	Peak position
"Jump"	Kris Kross	Totally Krossed Out	1
"Baby Got Back"	Sir Mix-a-Lot	Mack Daddy	1
"Jump Around"	House of Pain	House of Pain	3
"2 Legit 2 Quit"	Hammer	Too Legit to Quit	5
"Tennessee"	Arrested Development	3 Years, 5 Months and 2 Days in the Life Of...	6
"Addams Groove"	MC Hammer	The Addams Family	7
"People Everyday"	Arrested Development	3 Years, 5 Months and 2 Days in the Life Of...	8
"Warm It Up"	Kris Kross	Totally Krossed Out	13
"Mind Playing Tricks on Me"	Geto Boys	We Can't Be Stopped	23

== See also ==
- Last article: 1991 in hip-hop
- Next article: 1993 in hip-hop
