= Greatest Hits (Pimp C album) =

Compilation album by Pimp C
- Released: May 6, 2008
- Genre: Southern hip hop; gangsta rap
- Length: 1:07:27
- Label: Rap-A-Lot Records
- Producer: J. Prince (exec.)

Pimp C chronology
Pimpalation (2006)	Greatest Hits (2008)	The Naked Soul of Sweet Jones (2010)

Professional ratings
Review scores
Source	Rating
AllMusic	3.5/5 stars

Greatest Hits is the first compilation album by American rapper Pimp C. It was released on May 6, 2008 through Rap-A-Lot Records.

== Track listing ==
No.	Title	Length
1.	"Knockin Doors Down" (Intro)	0:24
2.	"Knockin Doors Down" (featuring P.O.P. & Lil' Keke)	4:02
3.	"Pop It 4 Pimp" (featuring Juvenile & Webbie)	3:50
4.	"Hogg in the Game" (Skit)	0:06
5.	"Hogg in the Game"	3:10
6.	"Is a Playa" (Skit)	0:27
7.	"Is a Playa" (featuring Z-Ro, Bun B & Twista)	4:36
8.	"The Honey" (Skit)	0:31
9.	"The Honey" (featuring Jazze Pha, Jody Breeze & Tela)	4:33
10.	"Wood Wheel" (Skit)	0:30
11.	"Wood Wheel"	4:57
12.	"Pourin' Up" (featuring Mike Jones & Bun B)	4:48
13.	"My Angel"	3:50
14.	"Swang Down"	2:28
15.	"16.5" (Skit)	0:18
16.	"16.5"	2:01
17.	"Free"	3:59
18.	"Comin' Up" (featuring Z-Ro & Lil' Flip)	4:57
19.	"Bobby & Whitney" (Skit)	0:15
20.	"Bobby and Whitney" (featuring 8Ball & MJG)	3:43
21.	"Ima Hustler"	4:19
22.	"Gitcha Mind Right" (featuring Cory Mo)	3:38
23.	"Mom and Bun" (Skit)	0:39
24.	"I Miss You" (featuring Z-Ro)	5:26
Total length:		1:07:27

== Charts ==
Chart (2008)	Peak position
US Top R&B/Hip-Hop Albums (Billboard)	24
US Top Rap Albums (Billboard)	8
