= Underground Kings =

Underground Kings may refer to:

- UGK, or Underground Kingz, an American hip hop duo
- Underground Kingz, their self-titled album
- "Under Ground Kings", a song by Drake from his 2011 album Take Care
