= Long Live the Pimp =

Studio album by Pimp C
- Released: December 4, 2015
- Studios: Sarm Studios, London, England
- Genre: Southern hip hop
- Length: 54:26
- Label: Mass Appeal
- Producers: Cory Mo; Crazy Mike; Hector Delgado; Juicy J; Kc On Tha Track; Lil Awree; Mr. Lee; Juicy J; Pimp C; Ray Murray

Pimp C chronology
Still Pimping (2011)	Long Live the Pimp (2015)

Singles from Long Live the Pimp
- 1. "3-Way Freak" Released: 2015

Professional ratings
Review scores
Source	Rating
AllMusic	3/5 stars
HipHopDX	3/5 stars
Pitchfork	5/10 stars

Long Live the Pimp is the fifth and final solo studio album by American rapper Pimp C. It was released on December 4, 2015, on the eighth anniversary of his death, making it his third posthumous solo release. Production was handled primarily by Mr. Lee, except for six tracks. The album features guest appearances from Juicy J, Bun B, Lil' Keke, 8Ball & MJG, A'Doni, A$AP Rocky, David Banner, Devin the Dude, E.S.G., Nas, Lil' Wayne, Slim Thug and Ty Dolla $ign.

The song "Wavybone" also appeared on A$AP Rocky's album At.Long.Last.A$AP.

== Track listing ==
No.	Title	Writer(s)	Producer(s)	Length
1.	"Long Live the Pimp (Intro)"	C. Butler; B. Davis; L. Williams, Jr.	Mr. Lee	1:42
2.	"3-Way Freak" (featuring Lil Wayne)	C. Butler; D. Carter, Jr.; L. Williams, Jr.	Mr. Lee	4:03
3.	"Ain't Said Shit" (featuring Ty Dolla $ign and Devin the Dude)	C. Butler; D. Copeland; T. Griffin; D. Emile II; L. Williams, Jr.	Mr. Lee	4:35
4.	"Wavybone" (performed by A$AP Rocky featuring Juicy J and UGK)	C. Butler; B. Freeman; J. Houston; R. Mayers; H. Delgado; E. Randle; L. Seymour; W. Mitchell; Y. Mitchell	Juicy J; Crazy Mike (add.); Hector Delgado (add.); Lil Awree (add.)	4:51
5.	"Spittin' Game (Interlude)"	C. Butler; L. Williams, Jr.	Mr. Lee	1:01
6.	"Trill" (featuring A'Doni, Slim Thug, E.S.G., and Lil' Keke)	C. Butler; A. Thomas; C. Hill; M. Edwards; S. Thomas; L. Williams, Jr.	Mr. Lee	4:25
7.	"Bitch Get Down" (performed by UGK featuring 8Ball & MJG)	C. Butler; B. Freeman; M. Goodwin; P. Smith; L. Williams, Jr.	Mr. Lee	5:13
8.	"Payday" (featuring Juicy J)	C. Butler; J. Houston	Juicy J; Crazy Mike (add.); Lil Awree (add.)	3:10
9.	"Slab Music" (featuring Lil' Keke)	C. Butler; M. Edwards; L. Williams, Jr.	Mr. Lee	3:14
10.	"True to the Game" (featuring David Banner)	C. Butler; L. Crump; L. Williams, Jr.	Mr. Lee	3:03
11.	"Triflin' Hoe (Interlude)"	C. Butler; L. Williams, Jr.	Mr. Lee	0:48
12.	"To Lose a Whore"	C. Butler	Pimp C	4:00
13.	"Friends" (featuring Juicy J and Nas)	C. Butler; J. Houston; N. Jones	Juicy J; Crazy Mike (add.); Lil Awree (add.)	4:11
14.	"Southside"	C. Butler; L. Williams, Jr.	Mr. Lee	3:09
15.	"Butta Cookies"	C. Butler; M. Taylor	Kc On Tha Track	3:05
16.	"Country Thang (Outro)"	C. Butler; M. Taylor; C. Moore; R. Murray	Kc On Tha Track; Cory Mo (add.); Ray Murray (add.)	3:47
Total length:				54:26

Bonus track
No.	Title	Writer(s)	Length
17.	"Twerk Something" (featuring T.I.)	Butler; C. Harris	3:25
Total length:			57:51

Sample credits

- Track 4 contains elements of "Could I Be Falling in Love", written by Earl Randle, Lawrence Seymour, Willie Mitchell, and Yvonne Mitchell, as performed by Syl Johnson.

== Personnel ==
- Chad Lamont Butler – main artist, producer (track 12), executive producer
- Jordan Michael Houston – featured artist & producer (tracks: 4, 8, 13), co-executive producer
- Bernard James Freeman – featured artist (tracks: 4, 7)
- Marcus Lakee Edwards – featured artist (tracks: 6, 9)
- Dwayne Michael Carter Jr. – featured artist (track 2)
- Devin C. Copeland – featured artist (track 3)
- Tyrone William Griffin Jr. – featured artist (track 3)
- Rakim Mayers – featured artist (track 4)
- Alexis Thomas – featured artist (track 6)
- Cedric Dormaine Hill – featured artist (track 6)
- Stayve Jerome Thomas – featured artist (track 6)
- Marlon Jermaine Goodwin – featured artist (track 7)
- Premro Smith – featured artist (track 7)
- Lavell William Crump – featured artist (track 10)
- Nasir bin Olu Dara Jones – featured artist (track 13)
- Leroy Williams Jr. – producer (tracks: 1–3, 5–7, 9–11, 14), mixing (tracks: 1–3, 5–10, 12–14), co-executive producer
- Matthew A. Taylor – producer (tracks: 15, 16)
- Hector Delgado – additional producer & recording (track 4)
- Michael Anthony Foster – additional producer (tracks: 4, 8, 13)
- Jeremiah "Lil Awree" Owens – additional producer (tracks: 4, 8, 13)
- Cory Moore – additional producer (track 16), additional recording (tracks: 3, 6)
- Raymond Murray – additional producer (track 16)
- Derek "MixedByAli" Ali – mixing (track 4)
- James Hunt – assistant mixing (track 4)
- Matt Schafer – assistant mixing (track 4)
- Rogelio Moya – mixing (track 11)
- Norman "MouseQuake" Barrett – mixing (track 15), assistant engineering (tracks: 1–3, 6–7, 9–10, 13–14)
- Rogelio Moya – mixing (track 16)
- Mike Moore – assistant engineering (track 1)
- John "Jonny Kash" Hoard – assistant engineering (track 3)
- Piston Push Keys – additional drum programming (track 6)
- Raymond "Rayface" Thomas – assistant engineering (track 12)
- Mark "Exit" Goodchild – additional recording (track 13)
- Gabriel Zardes – assistant additional recording (track 13)
- Blake La Grange – mastering
- Chinara Butler – executive producer, liner notes
- Mike Lukowski – art direction

== Charts ==
Chart (2015)	Peak position
US Billboard 200	96
US Top R&B/Hip-Hop Albums (Billboard)	17
US Top Rap Albums (Billboard)	11
US Independent Albums (Billboard)	3
