= Best of UGK =

Greatest hits album by UGK
- Released: June 17, 2003
- Recorded: 1992–2002
- Genre: Southern hip-hop; gangsta rap
- Length: 1:14:10
- Label: Jive
- Producer: Bernie Bismark; DJ DMD; N.O. Joe; Pimp C; Sergio; Shetoro Henderson

UGK chronology
Side Hustles (2002)	Best of UGK (2003)	UGK Chopped and Screwed (2004)

Professional ratings
Review scores
Source	Rating
RapReviews	8/10

Best of UGK is the second compilation album by American Southern hip-hop duo UGK. It was released on June 17, 2003, via Jive Records. Production was handled by Bernie Bismark, Shetoro Henderson, N.O. Joe, DJ DMD, Sergio, and Pimp C. It featured guest appearance from Devin the Dude.

== Track listing ==
No.	Title	Producer(s)	Length
1.	"I Left It Wet For You"	Pimp C	4:45
2.	"Something Good"	Bernie Bismark; Shetoro Henderson	5:27
3.	"Murder"	Pimp C	3:52
4.	"It's Supposed to Bubble"	DJ DMD	4:30
5.	"Pocket Full of Stones"	Pimp C; Bernie Bismark; Shetoro Henderson	5:03
6.	"Diamonds & Wood"	Pimp C	5:13
7.	"Short Texas"	Pimp C; Bernie Bismark; Shetoro Henderson	6:17
8.	"Let Me See It"	Pimp C	4:13
9.	"Front, Back & Side to Side"	Pimp C	5:14
10.	"Ain't That a Bitch (Ask Yourself)" (featuring Devin The Dude)	N.O. Joe	4:43
11.	"Protect & Serve"	Pimp C	4:35
12.	"Choppin' Blades"	Pimp C; N.O. Joe	4:46
13.	"Good Stuff"	Sergio	3:48
14.	"Pocket Full of Stones (Pimp C Remix)"	Pimp C; Bernie Bismark; Shetoro Henderson	6:13
15.	"One Day"	Pimp C	5:24
Total length:			1:14:10

== Charts ==
Chart (2003)	Peak position
US Top R&B/Hip-Hop Albums (Billboard)	22
