= International Players Anthem (I Choose You) =

2007 single by UGK featuring Outkast

- Vinyl cover

Single by UGK featuring Outkast

from the album Underground Kingz
- Released: June 6, 2007
- Recorded: 2006
- Genre: Southern hip-hop; trap
- Length: 4:25; 3:44 (radio edit)
- Label: Jive
- Songwriters: Bernard Freeman; Chad Butler; Andre Benjamin; Antwan Patton; Jordan Houston; Paul Beauregard
- Producers: DJ Paul; Juicy J

UGK singles chronology
| "The Game Belongs to Me" (2006) | "International Players Anthem (I Choose You)" (2007) | "Da Game Been Good to Me" (2009) |

OutKast singles chronology
| "The Train" (2006) | "International Players Anthem (I Choose You)" (2007) | "The Art of Storytellin' Part 4" (2008) |

"International Players Anthem (I Choose You)", listed on physical units with International abbreviated as "Int'l", is a song by American hip-hop duo UGK, released on June 6, 2007, as the second single from their fifth studio album Underground Kingz (2007). The song, produced by DJ Paul and Juicy J of Three 6 Mafia, features verses from fellow Southern hip-hop duo Outkast.

The song's beat was originally produced for Project Pat, who used it on the track "Choose U" from his 2002 album Layin' da Smack Down. The instrumental contains a sample of "I Choose You" by Willie Hutch. The song hit number 70 on the US Billboard Hot 100 chart, making it their first and only song to reach the chart. The song's official remix, featuring verses from Three 6 Mafia, is a bonus track on the album.

== Music video ==
The song's official music video, directed by Bryan Barber, premiered on MTV Jams on June 4, 2007. The video is centered on the fictional wedding of Outkast member André 3000, progressing through the men's waiting room before the ceremony, the wedding itself, the reception, and the afterparty dance. Before the wedding ceremony, UGK member Bun B and Three 6 Mafia ridicule André 3000 for rushing into getting married, and poke fun at him for wearing a red kilt ("I've got Scottish in my family", Andre calmly states).

DJ Paul humorously says that it makes him look like Roddy Piper of World Wrestling Entertainment (WWE). Andre defends his decision to get married, saying that he is ready to take the next step in life, and in turn berates his friends for not looking to get into commitments themselves. During the wedding, Andre talks about text messaging past flings and telling them that he has found love and will be giving up his life as a player. The audience remains seated as the bride, played by actress Salina Soto (CSI:NY, Forbidden), marches to the altar, a boy plays with an oversize toy spaceship, and one of Andre's past flings makes a side remark to him (the verse that is being rapped), to the dismay of her date, Fonzworth Bentley.

A choir and its director sing the "I Choose You" vocals as the wedding progresses, while the groomsmen and other friends implore Andre to "keep your heart, 3 stacks!". Later at the afterparty, two of Andre's past flings get into an argument while attempting to catch the bride's bouquet, which escalates into a full-blown fist fight that destroys the wedding cake and much of the buffet.

The male onlookers are pleasantly shocked, the bride is almost reduced to tears, but the rest of the main characters (including the bride) all smile at the end, apparently having a good time. The video features cameo appearances by Bishop Don "Magic" Juan, Three 6 Mafia, Chamillionaire, T-Pain, Fonzworth Bentley, David Banner, Kardinal Offishall, Nicole Ari Parker, Big Gipp, comedian DeRay Davis, and comedian Alex Thomas, along with actor Lukas Haas. This became the last video appearance of UGK member Pimp C, before his death on December 4, 2007.

== Accolades ==
The song was nominated for the Grammy Award for Best Rap Performance by a Duo or Group at the 50th Annual Grammy Awards. The song was number 10 on Rolling Stone's list of the 100 Best Songs of 2007 and number 91 on their 500 Greatest Songs of All Time. Pitchfork Media's "The 200 Best Songs of the 2000s" listed the song at number 43.

At the 2007 BET Hip Hop Awards in October, "International Player's Anthem" was nominated for Best Video and won Best Collaboration. Kanye West had won the Best Video award but felt UGK deserved it more, subsequently calling up Big Boi during his acceptance speech, who returned the award feeling West deserved it. At the 2008 BET Awards, the song won BET Award for Video of the Year.

== Charts ==
=== Weekly charts ===
| Chart (2007) | Peak position |
|---|---|
| US Billboard Hot 100 | 70 |
| US Hot R&B/Hip-Hop Songs (Billboard) | 12 |
| US Hot Rap Songs (Billboard) | 10 |

=== Year-end charts ===
| Chart (2007) | Position |
|---|---|
| US Hot R&B/Hip-Hop Songs (Billboard) | 60 |

== Certifications ==
| Region | Certification | Certified units/sales |
|---|---|---|
| New Zealand (RMNZ) | Gold | 15,000^{‡} |
^{‡} Sales+streaming figures based on certification alone.
