= Underground Kingz =

Studio album by UGK
- Released: August 7, 2007
- Recorded: 2006–2007
- Genres: Hip-hop; Southern hip-hop
- Length: 60:59 (disc one); 68:02 (disc two); 129:01 (combined)
- Labels: UGK; Jive; Zomba
- Producers: N.O. Joe; AVEREXX; Below; The Blackout Movement; DJ Paul; Juicy J; Jazze Pha; Joe Traxx; John Bido; Lil Jon; Marley Marl; MoMo; Pimp C; Swizz Beatz; DJ B-Do; Scarface; The Runners; Yung Fyngas

UGK chronology
Side Hustles (2002)	Underground Kingz (2007)	UGK 4 Life (2009)

Singles from Underground Kingz
- 1. "The Game Belongs to Me" Released: 2006; 2. "Int'l Players Anthem (I Choose You)" Released: June 6, 2007

Professional ratings
Review scores
Source	Rating
AllMusic	4/5 stars
Entertainment Weekly	B+
Houston Chronicle	3/4 stars
RapReviews	(10/10)
The New York Times	(favorable)
Pitchfork Media	(8.4/10)
Rolling Stone	3.5/5 stars
Stylus Magazine	B+
USA Today	3.5/4 stars
XXL	(XL)

Underground Kingz is the fifth studio album by American hip-hop duo UGK. The album was released on August 7, 2007, by Pimp C's UGK Records, Jive Records, and Zomba Label Group. The production on the album was handled by multiple producers including Lil Jon, Jazze Pha, Swizz Beatz, DJ Paul and Pimp C himself. The album also features guest appearances from T.I., Talib Kweli, Rick Ross, Big Daddy Kane, Slim Thug, Too Short, Charlie Wilson, Outkast, and Three 6 Mafia, and among others.

Underground Kingz was supported by two singles: "The Game Belongs to Me" and "Int'l Players Anthem (I Choose You)". The album received positive reviews from music critics and was a commercial success, debuting atop the US Billboard 200 chart, selling 160,000 copies in its first week. The album was also Pimp C's final performance before his death on December 4, 2007, in Los Angeles, California, four months after the album's release.

== Singles ==
The first single was "The Game Belongs To Me", produced by AVEREXX. The second single was "Int'l Players Anthem (I Choose You)" featuring OutKast, and the video was released on 106 & Park, June 16, 2007. The track is a remix of "Players Anthem" featuring Three 6 Mafia. The video was awarded Video of the Year at the 2008 annual BET Hip-Hop Awards. The song was nominated for the Grammy Award for Best Rap Performance by a Duo or Group. This song was number 10 on Rolling Stone's list of the 100 Best Songs of 2007, and reached number 70 on the Billboard Hot 100, making it their only song to chart there.

Pitchfork Media's "Top 500 songs of the 2000s" listed the song at number 43. It was their first album since Pimp C had finished serving a lengthy prison term.

== Commercial performance ==
Underground Kingz debuted at number one on the US Billboard 200 chart, selling 160,000 copies in its first week. This became UGK's first US number one debut. As of March 2009, the album has sold 460,000 copies in the United States.

== Track listing ==
Credits adapted from liner notes.

Disc one
No.	Title	Writer(s)	Producer(s)	Length
1.	"Swishas and Dosha"	Chad Butler; Bernard Freeman; Step Rideau; Stevie Below	Below; Pimp C (co.)	5:11
2.	"Int'l Players Anthem (I Choose You)" (featuring Outkast)	Butler; Freeman; Jordan Houston; Paul Beauregard; André Benjamin; Antwan Patton; Willie Hutch	Juicy J; DJ Paul	4:19
3.	"Chrome Plated Woman"	Butler; Freeman; Allen Toussaint	Pimp C	4:17
4.	"Life Is 2009" (featuring Too $hort)	Butler; Freeman; Brad Jordan; Randy Jefferson; Todd Shaw	Scarface; Randy "Big Tyme" Jefferson (add.)	4:07
5.	"The Game Belongs to Me"	Butler; Freeman; Avery Harris; Wesley Harris III; Joseph Johnson	AVEREXX; Pimp C (co.); N.O. Joe (co.)	5:14
6.	"Like That (Remix)"	Butler; Freeman; Below; A. Harris	Below; Pimp C (co.)	3:50
7.	"Gravy"	Butler; Freeman; Phalon Alexander; A. Harris	AVEREXX; Pimp C (co.)	4:57
8.	"Underground Kingz"	Butler; Freeman	Pimp C	4:33
9.	"Grind Hard" (performed by Pimp C featuring Young T.O.E. and DJ B-Do)	Butler; Torris McKinney; Bradley Davis	DJ B-Do; Pimp C (co.)	4:03
10.	"Take tha Hood Back" (featuring Slim Thug, Vicious and Middle Fingaz)	Butler; Freeman; Andrew Harr; Jermaine Jackson; Stayve Thomas; George Hill; Avery Stevenson; Eric Johnson	The Runners	5:36
11.	"Quit Hatin' the South" (featuring Charlie Wilson and Willie D)	Butler; Freeman; Willie Dennis; Benny Latimore	Pimp C	6:06
12.	"Heaven"	Butler; Freeman; J. Johnson	Pimp C; N.O. Joe	4:20
13.	"Trill Niggas Don't Die" (featuring Z-Ro)	Butler; Freeman; John Okuribido; Brian Jackson; Joseph Howard, Jr.; Joseph McVey; Nick Zesses; Dino Fekaris	John Bido; Yung Fyngas; Joe Traxx; Pimp C (co.)	4:27
Total length:				60:59

Disc two
No.	Title	Writer(s)	Producer(s)	Length
1.	"How Long Can It Last" (featuring Charlie Wilson)	Butler; Freeman; Albert Hudson; Cuba Gregory; Al Perkins	Pimp C	6:47
2.	"Still Ridin' Dirty" (featuring Scarface)	Butler; Freeman; Jordan; Mike Dean	Scarface	5:19
3.	"Stop-N-Go" (featuring Jazze Pha)	Butler; Freeman; Alexander; Abeeku Ribeiro; Antonio Sawyer	Jazze Pha	3:54
4.	"Cocaine" (featuring Rick Ross)	Butler; Freeman; Winston Thomas; Thomas Simmons; Danny Shofield; Joseph Johnson; William Roberts	The BlackOut Movement; Pimp C (co.); N.O. Joe (co.)	4:50
5.	"Two Type of Bitches" (featuring Dizzee Rascal and Pimpin' Ken)	Butler; Freeman; Ollie Moore; Dylan Mills; Kenneth Ivy; Johnny Bristol; Gladys Knight; Merald Knight, Jr.	MoMo; Pimp C (co.)	4:56
6.	"Real Women" (featuring Talib Kweli and Raheem DeVaughn)	Butler; Freeman; Talib Kweli Greene; Skip Scarborough	Pimp C	4:32
7.	"Candy"	Butler; Freeman; Jordan; Jefferson; Tekai Hicks; Eric Paul	Scarface; Randy "Bigg Tyme" Jefferson (co.)	3:30
8.	"Tell Me How Ya Feel"	Butler; Freeman; Alexander; Zachary Wallace	Jazze Pha	4:25
9.	"Shattered Dreams" (featuring Sleepy Brown)	Butler; Freeman; Ray Parker Jr.	Pimp C	5:14
10.	"Like That"	Butler; Freeman; Jonathan Smith; Craig Love; LaMarquis Jefferson	Lil Jon	2:47
11.	"Next Up" (featuring Big Daddy Kane and Kool G Rap)	Butler; Freeman; Marlon Williams; Antonio Hardy; Nathaniel Wilson	Marley Marl	3:03
12.	"Living This Life"	Butler; Freeman; J. Johnson; Patrick Brown; Raymond Murray; Rico Wade; Cee-Lo Green; Al Green	N.O. Joe; Joe Scorsese	5:07
13.	"Outro"	Butler; Freeman; Cory Moore	Cory Mo	0:49
14.	"Int'l Players Anthem (I Choose You)" (featuring Three 6 Mafia) (Chopped and Screwed by OG Ron C) (bonus track)	Butler; Freeman; Houston; Beauregard; Hutch	DJ Paul; Juicy J	5:31
15.	"Int'l Players Anthem (I Choose You)" (featuring Three 6 Mafia) (bonus track)	Butler; Freeman; Houston; Beauregard; Hutch	DJ Paul; Juicy J	3:20
16.	"Hit the Block" (featuring T.I.) (bonus track)	Butler; Freeman; Kasseem Dean; Clifford Harris; Sean Combs; Christopher Wallace; Joey Brooks; Steve Jordan; Carl Mitchell; Anthony Henderson; Steven Howse; Bryon McCane	Swizz Beatz	3:58
Total length:				68:02

Best Buy bonus track
No.	Title	Length
17.	"Top Drop Dyne" (featuring Cory Mo)	4:06
Total length:		133:07

Samples

- "Swishas and Dosha" contains a sample of "From Step to You" by Stephen J. Rideau.
- "Int'l Players Anthem (I Choose You)" contains samples of "I Choose You" by Willie Hutch and "I Choose You" by Project Pat.
- "Chrome Plated Woman" contains a sample of "Hercules" by Allen Toussaint.
- "Life Is 2009" contains a sample of "Life is... Too Short" by Too Short.
- "Grind Hard" contains a sample of "Cocaine In The Back of the Ride" by UGK.
- "Quit Hatin' the South" contains a sample of "Let's Straighten It Out" by Benny Latimore.
- "Trill Niggas Don't Die" contains a sample of "I Just Want to Celebrate" by Nick Zesses and Dino Fekaris.
- "How Long Can It Last" contains a sample of "Something in the Past" by One Way.
- "Still Ridin' Dirty" contains a sample of "The Fix" by Scarface.
- "Two Type of Bitches" contains a sample of "Daddy Could Swear, I Declare" by Gladys Knight & the Pips.
- "Real Women" contains a sample of "Can't Hide Love" by Earth, Wind, & Fire.
- "Candy" contains a sample of "Bridge Thru Time" by Lonnie Liston Smith.
- "Shattered Dreams" contains a sample of "Goin' Thru School and Love" by Raydio.
- "Next Up" contains a sample of "The Symphony" by Juice Crew.
- "Living This Life" contains samples of "Free" by Goodie Mob and "Free at Last" by Al Green.
- "Hit the Block" contains a sample of "Spit Your Game (Remix)" by The Notorious B.I.G.

== Chart positions ==
=== Weekly charts ===
Chart (2007)	Peak position
US Billboard 200	1
US Top R&B/Hip-Hop Albums (Billboard)	1

=== Year-end charts ===
Chart (2007)	Position
US Billboard 200	141
US Top R&B/Hip-Hop Albums (Billboard)	37
