= Super Tight =

Super Tight...

Studio album by UGK
- Released: August 30, 1994
- Recorded: 1993–94
- Studio: Big Ole Bud, Dallas Sound Lab, Digital Services, Studio 13, Ultra Sound Studios; (Dallas, Texas)
- Genre: Southern hip-hop; country rap; trap
- Length: 51:48
- Label: Jive
- Producer: Pimp C; DJ DMD

UGK chronology
Too Hard to Swallow (1992)	Super Tight... (1994)	Ridin' Dirty (1996)

Professional ratings
Review scores
Source	Rating
AllMusic	4/5 stars
RapReviews	10/10

Super Tight... is the second studio album by American hip-hop duo UGK. The album was released on August 30, 1994, by Jive Records. As of 2011, it has sold 375,000 copies. Super Tight... is notable for being the first UGK album to have The Meters guitarist Leo Nocentelli featured as a session musician.

== Track listing ==
- All songs written by Chad Butler and Bernard Freeman, except where noted.

No.	Title	Producer(s)	Length
1.	"Return"	Pimp C	2:13
2.	"Underground"	Pimp C	3:18
3.	"It's Supposed to Bubble"	Pimp C; DJ DMD	4:31
4.	"I Left It Wet for You"	Pimp C; DJ DMD	4:45
5.	"Feds in Town"	Pimp C	5:32
6.	"Pocket Full of Stones Pt. 2"	Pimp C	5:02
7.	"Front, Back & Side to Side" (featuring Smoke D)	Pimp C	5:13
8.	"Protect & Serve"	Pimp C	4:36
9.	"Stoned Junkee" (featuring 3-2)	Pimp C	6:47
10.	"Pussy Got Me Dizzy" (featuring 3-2)	Pimp C	5:05
11.	"Three Sixteens"	Pimp C; DJ DMD	4:45

== Personnel ==
Credits adapted from liner notes and AllMusic

- Pimp C – programming, recording engineer
- Leo Nocentelli – guitar
- David Tornkanowsky – piano, organ
- Chris Severin – bass
- Tim Kimsey – recording engineer, mixing
- Tim Latham – recording engineer, mixing
- Matthew Burrus – recording engineer
- Sterling Winnfield – recording engineer
- Roger Tausz – mixing
- Tom Coyne – mastering
- Shawn Mortensen – photography

== Chart positions ==
Chart (1994)	Peak position
US Billboard 200	95
US Top R&B/Hip-Hop Albums (Billboard)	9
