= Dirty Money (album) =

Studio album by UGK
- Released: November 13, 2001
- Recorded: 1998–2001
- Studios: UGK Studios, Compu-Music Studios, PatchWerk Recording Studios, Silent Sound Studios, D.A.R.P. Studios; (Atlanta, Georgia); Platinum Works Studios, Atomic Dog Studios; (Houston, Texas)
- Genre: Southern hip-hop
- Length: 60:37
- Label: Jive
- Producers: Bryan-Michael Cox; John Bido; N.O. Joe; Pimp C; Jermaine Dupri

UGK chronology
Ridin' Dirty (1996)	Dirty Money (2001)	Side Hustles (2002)

Professional ratings
Review scores
Source	Rating
AllMusic	3/5 stars
The Source	3.5/5 stars

Dirty Money is the fourth studio album by American hip-hop duo UGK. It was released on November 13, 2001, by Jive Records. The album came after a five-year hiatus, however, the duo had been planning on releasing this album since 1998, and ads for it appeared in some of the late 1998's Jive albums.

== Track listing ==
- Credits adapted from liner notes.

No.	Title	Writer(s)	Producer(s)	Length
1.	"Let Me See It"	Chad Butler; Bernard Freeman	Pimp C; N.O. Joe	4:13
2.	"Choppin' Blades"	Butler; Freeman; Jesse Weaver, Jr.; Earl Stevens; Brandt Jones; Tenina Stevens; Dannell Stevens; Marvin Whitemon	Pimp C; N.O. Joe	4:46
3.	"Look at Me"	Butler; Freeman	Pimp C	3:46
4.	"Ain't That a Bitch (Ask Yourself)" (featuring Devin the Dude)	Butler; Freeman; John Watson; Carlton Ridenhour; Hank Shocklee; Eric Sadler; William Drayton	N.O. Joe	4:43
5.	"Gold Grill" (featuring 8Ball & MJG)	Butler; Freeman; Premro Smith; Marlon Goodwin	N.O. Joe	4:15
6.	"PA Nigga"	Butler; Freeman	N.O. Joe	4:23
7.	"Holdin' Na" (featuring C-Note)	Butler; Freeman; Courtney Smith; Robert Ford; D. Miller; J.B. Moore; Larry Smith; Kurtis Walker	N.O. Joe	4:02
8.	"Don't Say Shit" (featuring Big Gipp of Goodie Mob)	Butler; Freeman; Cameron Gipp	Pimp C	4:36
9.	"Dirty Money"	Butler; Freeman	N.O. Joe	4:53
10.	"Like a Pimp" (featuring Juicy J and DJ Paul of Three 6 Mafia)	Butler; Freeman; Jordan Houston; Paul Beauregard; Eric Barrier; William Griffin; Todd Shaw; S. Jordan	Pimp C	4:54
11.	"Pimpin' Ain't No Illusion" (featuring Kool Ace and Too Short)	Butler; Freeman; Brian "Kool Ace" Fleming; Shaw	Pimp C	6:01
12.	"Take It Off" (bonus track)	Butler; Freeman; Barry White	Pimp C	3:30
13.	"Wood Wheel" (bonus track)	Butler; Freeman; Bettye Crutcher; John Bido	Pimp C; Bido	4:56
14.	"Money, Hoes & Power" (featuring Jermaine Dupri) (bonus track)	Butler; Freeman; Jermaine Dupri; Bryan-Michael Cox	Dupri; Cox (co.)	4:19
Total length:				60:37

Sample credits

- "Let Me See It" contains a sample from "Here We Go (Live at the Funhouse)" performed by Run-DMC.
- "Choppin' Blades" contains samples from "P.S.K. – What Does It Mean?" performed by Schoolly D, and "Captain Save a Hoe" performed by E-40.
- "Ain't That a Bitch (Ask Yourself)" contains a sample from "Chains and Things" performed by B.B. King.
- "Like a Pimp" contains a sample from "Don't Look Any Further" performed by Dennis Edwards.
- "Take It Off" contains a sample from "Love Serenade" performed by Barry White.
- "Wood Wheel" contain a sample from "Love Comes in All Colors" performed by The Staple Singers.
- "Money, Hoes & Power" contains a sample from "Midnight and You" performed by Love Unlimited Orchestra.

== Charts ==
=== Weekly charts ===
Chart (2001)	Peak position
US Billboard 200	19
US Top R&B/Hip-Hop Albums (Billboard)	2

=== Year-end charts ===
Chart (2002)	Position
US Top R&B/Hip-Hop Albums (Billboard)	40
