= Missez =

- Origin: Canarsie, Brooklyn, New York, United States
- Genres: R&B
- Labels: Interscope
- Members: Keysha; Rashe
- Past members: Tomi
- Website: www.myspace.com/missez

Missez were an American-German R&B group composed of Tomi, Keysha and Rashe. The group's only released as of 2006 was the single “Love Song” which peaked at #53 on Billboard’s Hot R&B/Hip-Hop Songs chart, staying on the chart for 20 weeks. After that, the group faded into obscurity. The group never released an album.

== Discography ==
=== Singles ===
Year	Title	Peak chart positions
Year	Title	US R&B
2006	"Love Song" (featuring Pimp C)	53
