= Knockin' Doorz Down =

Single by Pimp C featuring P.O.P. & Lil Keke

from the album Pimpalation
- Released: 2006
- Genre: Southern hip-hop, gangsta rap
- Length: 4:24
- Label: Rap-a-Lot Records
- Songwriters: Pimp C, Marcus Edwards, Michael Shawn Robinson, Marvin Rucker
- Producer: Myke Diesel

Pimp C singles chronology
"Get Throwed" (2005)	"Knockin' Doorz Down" (2006)	"What Up" (2009)

Lil' Keke singles chronology
"Draped Up" (2005)	"Knockin' Doorz Down" (2006)	"Break 'Em Off" (2007)

"Knockin' Doorz Down" is the second single off Pimp C's second album Pimpalation. It features P.O.P. & Lil Keke. In the music video, directed by Benny Mathews, the third verse is rapped by Pimp C instead of Lil Keke. Lil Flip, Mike Jones, Trae, Bun B, & J. Prince also made cameo appearances. In the song, Pimp C raps about Houston's current status. He also tries to squash altercations with T.I. for using the term 'King of the South' with his lyrics "If them niggaz come together you know how much paper we could see?". Houston hip-hop artists Lil' Flip, Slim Thug, & Z-Ro are also mentioned. He also talked about how Paul Wall & Chamillionaire breaking up and going separate ways. Moreover, he raps about Lil Keke and his new album with Swishahouse. The video is given a Godfather theme. The video was not as popular as videos for songs like 'Pourin' Up', mainly because there are several displays of graphic violence. However, it was nominated for Best Video at the 2007 Ozone Magazine Awards.
