= Side Hustles =

Compilation album by UGK
- Released: September 24, 2002
- Recorded: 1997–2001
- Genre: Southern hip-hop; gangsta rap
- Length: 54:04
- Label: Jive
- Producer: Barry Adams; Byrd; Colin Wolfe; Franklin "Livin' Proof" Crum; Gavin "Pretty Boy" Marchand; Melvin Coleman; Organized Noize; Pimp C; Scarface; Studio Ton; Ty Fyffe

UGK chronology
Lost Tracks (2002)	Side Hustles (2002)	Best of UGK (2003)

Side Hustles is the first compilation album by American Southern hip-hop duo UGK. It was released on September 24, 2002, via Jive Records. Production was handled by Barry Adams, Byrd, Colin Wolfe, Franklin "Livin' Proof" Crum, Gavin "Pretty Boy" Marchand, Melvin Coleman, Organized Noize, Scarface, Studio Ton, Ty Fyffe and Pimp C. It features guest appearances from Mil, Too $hort, 8Ball, B-Legit, Celly Cel, E-40, K.B., Marquaze, Q, Rob Jackson, Scarface, Sonji Mickey and Young Smitty. The album peaked at number 70 on the Billboard 200 and number 10 on the Top R&B/Hip-Hop Albums in the United States.

== Critical reception ==
Professional ratings
Review scores
Source	Rating
AllMusic	3.5/5 stars

== Track listing ==
No.	Title	Writer(s)	Producer(s)	Length
1.	"Belts to Match" (featuring Young Smitty and Sonji Mickey)	Bernard Freeman; Chad Butler; Bessie Smith; Patrick Brown	Organized Noize	4:01
2.	"Breakin' Sketti" (featuring Rob Jackson)	Freeman; Rob Jackson; Melvin Coleman	Melvin Coleman	3:50
3.	"They Down With Us" (featuring Scarface)	Freeman; Butler; Brad Jordan; Joseph Johnson	Scarface	4:44
4.	"Dirty Dirty (Remix)" (featuring Mil)	Jameel Smith; Gavin Marchand; Tyrone Fyffe	Pretty Boy; Ty Fyffe	4:50
5.	"The Corruptor's Execution" (featuring B-Legit and E-40)	Freeman; Butler; Brandt Jones; Earl Stevens; George Clinton; Gregory Hutchison; Isaac Hayes	Pimp C	4:13
6.	"Pop the Trunk" (featuring Celly Cel)	Freeman; Butler; Marcellus McCarver; Marvin Whitemon	Studio Ton	4:06
7.	"Cigarette" (featuring K.B., Too $hort and 8Ball)	Freeman; Butler; Todd Shaw; Premro Smith; Craig Byrd	Byrd	5:08
8.	"We Big Mane" (featuring Q and Marquaze)	Freeman; Quenton Scrutchins; Marquaze J. Harris	Barry Adams	4:33
9.	"All About It" (featuring Too $hort)	Butler; Shaw; Colin Wolfe	Colin Wolfe	7:39
10.	"The Game" (featuring Mil)	Freeman; J. Smith; Franklin Crum	Livin' Proof	4:45
11.	"Pocket Full of Stones" (Pimp C remix)	Freeman; Butler	Pimp C	6:15
Total length:				54:04

== Charts ==
Chart (2002)	Peak position
US Billboard 200	70
US Top R&B/Hip-Hop Albums (Billboard)	10
