= Da Game Been Good to Me =

Single by UGK

from the album UGK 4 Life
- Released: January 16, 2009
- Genre: Hip-hop
- Length: 4:25
- Label: Jive; Epic
- Songwriters: B. Freeman; C. Butler; A. Harris
- Producers: Pimp C; AVEREXX

UGK singles chronology
| "International Players Anthem (I Choose You)" (2007) | "Da Game Been Good to Me" (2009) | "What Up" (2010) |

"Da Game Been Good to Me" is the only single from UGK's final studio album UGK 4 Life. The song was released onto the Internet on January 16, 2009 and on iTunes February 20, 2009.

== Music video ==
The music video was released on March 30, 2009, the day before the album's release. The music video features past videos of UGK, director's cuts of videos and mash ups of them. There are flashes of those videos, as well as bash paper showing pictures of UGK and reading the lyrics in fancy fonts.

== Chart positions ==
| Chart (2009) | Peak position |
|---|---|
| U.S. Billboard Bubbling Under R&B/Hip-Hop Singles | 1 |
