= UGK 4 Life =

Studio album by UGK
- Released: March 31, 2009
- Recorded: 2007–2008
- Studios: Mad Studios (Houston, TX); Swagger Studios (Los Angeles, CA); Trill Cave Studios (Port Arthur, TX); Maximedia Studios (Dallas, TX); Chung King Studios (New York, NY); Silent Sound Recording Studios (Atlanta, GA); Legacy Recording Studios (New York, NY)
- Genre: Hip-hop
- Length: 58:19
- Labels: II Trill; UGK; Jive
- Producers: Akon; Averexx; Cory Mo; DJ B-Do; Giorgio Tuinfort; Mannie Fresh; Mike Dean; Pimp C; Steve Below

UGK chronology
Underground Kingz (2007)	UGK 4 Life (2009)

Bun B chronology
II Trill (2008)	UGK 4 Life (2009)	Trill OG (2010)

Pimp C chronology
Underground Kingz (2007)	UGK 4 Life (2009)	The Naked Soul of Sweet Jones (2010)

Singles from UGK 4 Life
- 1. "Da Game Been Good to Me" Released: January 16, 2009

UGK 4 Life is the sixth and final studio album by American hip-hop duo UGK. It was released on March 31, 2009, by Bun B's II Trill Enterprises, Pimp C's UGK Records, and Jive Records. Recording sessions took place at Mad Studios in Houston, Swagger Studios in Los Angeles, Trill Cave Studios in Port Arthur, Maximedia Studios in Dallas, Chung King Studios and Legacy Recording Studios in New York, and Silent Sound Recording Studios in Atlanta. Production was handled by Cory Mo, Pimp C, Steve Below, Averexx, DJ B-Do, Mannie Fresh and Akon, with Mike Dean and Giorgio Tuinfort serving as co-producers. It features guest appearances from 8Ball & MJG, Akon, Big Gipp, B-Legit, E-40, Lil' Boosie, Raheem DeVaughn, Ronald Isley, Sleepy Brown, Snoop Dogg, Too $hort and Webbie.

In the United States, the album debuted at number six on the Billboard 200, number two on the Top R&B/Hip-Hop Albums and topped the Rap Albums charts, selling 77,000 copies in its first week.

The album was supported with the only single "Da Game Been Good to Me", which peaked at number 84 on the US Billboard Hot R&B/Hip-Hop Songs.

The album marks the first posthumously released album for the Underground Kingz member Pimp C, as the rapper was found dead in his room at the Mondrian Hotel in Los Angeles on December 4, 2007.

== Background ==
In March 2008, Bun B confirmed the final UGK studio album would be dedicated to the late Pimp C.

The first single "Da Game Been Good to Me" was released onto the Internet on January 16, 2009. It was made available on iTunes on February 12, 2009. Bun B stated he recorded a song dedicated to his late partner Pimp C.

Bun B stated that he would not experiment with new collaborations or producers.

This album is not about who I wanna work with and what kind of beats I wanna do, this album is about what the people wanna hear, and that's Bun and Pimp. And I wanna try to give that to them in the most purest sense".

== Critical reception ==
Professional ratings
Aggregate scores
Source	Rating
Metacritic	84/100
Review scores
Source	Rating
AllMusic	3.5/5 stars
Cokemachineglow	75/100%
Consequence of Sound	D
HipHopDX	4/5
Los Angeles Times	3.5/4 stars
Pitchfork	7.9/10
PopMatters	8/10
RapReviews	8.5/10
Spin	7/10 marks
The Michigan Daily	2.5/5 stars

UGK 4 Life was met with universal acclaim from music critics. At Metacritic, which assigns a normalized rating out of 100 to reviews from mainstream publications, the album received an average score of 84, based on eleven reviews.

Chase Hoffberger of The Austin Chronicle praised the album, calling it "one fantastic curtain call". Jeff Weiss of Los Angeles Times called it "the rare swan song that manages to be essential for the music alone". Steve Juon of RapReviews wrote: "from the 'Intro' to the 'Outro' there's very little to not like about UGK 4 Life other than the fact it can never be done again, and any music videos released off this album won't feature Pimp doin' his thang". Jordan Sargent of PopMatters concluded: "the fact that this has been UGK's music for nearly two decades doesn't blunt the impact of the album, and so UGK 4 Life is comfort food for Southern rap heads: not as invigorating as the first time, but still the best all the same". Ian Cohen of Pitchfork resumed: "though probably not the best UGK album, it might be the strongest illustration of what they do best". Clayton Purdom of Cokemachineglow found the album "leaves listeners wondering where they might go next". Thomas Golianopoulos of Spin called it "a fitting capper to this Texas duo's storied career--nothing groundbreaking, just funky, rough-hewn, celebratory tracks".

== Track listing ==
No.	Title	Writer(s)	Producer(s)	Length
1.	"Intro"	Chad Butler; Cory Moore	Cory Mo	1:45
2.	"Still on the Grind" (featuring Raheem DeVaughn)	Butler; Bernard Freeman; Steve Below	Steve Below	4:12
3.	"Everybody Wanna Ball"	Butler; Freeman; Moore	Cory Mo	3:57
4.	"Feelin' You"	Butler; Freeman; Below; Howard Beverly	Steve Below	3:54
5.	"The Pimp & the Bun" (featuring Ronald Isley)	Butler; Freeman; Ronald Isley; Ernie Isley; Marvin Isley; O'Kelly Isley Jr.; Rudolph Isley; Chris Jasper	Mannie Fresh	3:31
6.	"She Luv It"	Butler; Freeman; Moore	Cory Mo	3:52
7.	"7th Street Interlude"	Butler; Freeman; Michael Dean	Pimp C; Mike Dean (co.)	1:26
8.	"Swishas & Erb" (featuring Sleepy Brown)	Butler; Freeman; Patrick Brown; Raymond Murray; Rico Wade; Ruben Bailey	Pimp C; Averexx	4:02
9.	"Purse Come First" (featuring Big Gipp)	Butler; Freeman; Cameron Gipp; Michael Hawkins; Lee Hutson	DJ B-Do; Pimp C	4:22
10.	"Harry Asshole" (featuring Lil' Boosie and Webbie)	Butler; Freeman; Torrance Hatch; Webster Gradney; Moore	Cory Mo	4:13
11.	"Used to Be" (featuring E-40, B-Legit and 8Ball & MJG)	Butler; Freeman; Earl Stevens; Brandt Jones; Premro Smith; Marlon Goodwin	Pimp C; DJ B-Do	5:39
12.	"Steal Your Mind" (featuring Too $hort and Snoop Dogg)	Butler; Freeman; Todd Shaw; Calvin Broadus; Below	Steve Below	4:45
13.	"Texas Ave. Interlude"	Butler; Freeman; Dean	Pimp C; Mike Dean (co.)	1:15
14.	"Hard as Hell" (featuring Akon)	Butler; Freeman; Aliaune Thiam; Giorgio Tuinfort	Akon; Giorgio Tuinfort (co.)	3:55
15.	"Da Game Been Good to Me"	Butler; Freeman; Avery Harris	Pimp C; Averexx	4:20
16.	"Outro"	Freeman; Moore	Cory Mo	3:10
Total length:				58:19

Sample credits

- Track 4 contains a sample from "Feel That You're Feelin'" written by Frankie Beverly as performed by Maze.
- Track 5 contains a portion of the composition "Here We Go Again" written by Ernie Isley, Marvin Isley, Ronald Isley, O'Kelly Isley Jr., Rudolph Isley and Chris Jasper.
- Track 8 contains a sample from "Peaches & Erb" written by Patrick Brown, Raymond Murray, Rico Wade and Ruben Bailey as performed by Society of Soul.
- Track 9 contains a sample from "Try Love Again" written by Michael Hawkins and Lee Hutson as performed by The Natural Four.
- Track 10 contains a sample from "I Left It Wet for You" written by Chad Butler and Bernard Freeman as performed by UGK.

== Personnel ==
- Chad "Pimp C" Butler — vocals, producer (tracks: 7–9, 11, 13, 15), executive producer
- Bernard "Bun B" Freeman — vocals, executive producer
- Raheem DeVaughn — vocals (track 2)
- Ronald Isley — vocals (track 5)
- Patrick "Sleepy" Brown — vocals (track 8)
- Cameron "Big Gipp" Gipp — vocals (track 9)
- Torrance "Lil' Boosie" Hatch — vocals (track 10)
- Webster "Webbie" Gradney — vocals (track 10)
- Earl "E-40" Stevens — vocals (track 11)
- Brandt "B-Legit" Jones — vocals (track 11)
- Premro "8Ball" Smith — vocals (track 11)
- Marlon "MJG" Goodwin — vocals (track 11)
- Todd "Too $hort" Shaw — vocals (track 12)
- Calvin "Snoop Dogg" Broadus — vocals (track 12)
- Aliaune Akon Thiam — vocals and producer (track 14)
- Rick Marcel — additional guitars (tracks: 1, 3, 16)
- Cory "Mo" Moore — producer (tracks: 1, 3, 6, 10, 16), recording (tracks: 1, 2, 4–8, 10, 13, 16)
- Steve Below — producer (tracks: 2, 4, 12)
- Byron "Mannie Fresh" Thomas — producer (track 5)
- Avery "Averexx" Harris — producer (tracks: 8, 15), recording (tracks: 4, 8, 14, 15), mixing (track 15)
- Bradley "DJ B-Do" Davis — producer and recording (tracks: 9, 11)
- Mike Dean — co-producer (tracks: 7, 13), mixing, mastering
- Giorgio Tuinfort — co-producer (track 14)
- Mike Mo — recording (tracks: 2, 3, 6, 10), mixing (track 16)
- Matt Aslanian — recording (track 12)
- Ari Raskin — recording (track 14)
- Mark "Exit" Goodchild — recording (track 14)
- Chris Soper — recording (track 14)
- Leslie Brathwaite — mixing (track 14)
- Hal Fitzgerald — additional recording (track 2)
- Bob Brown — additional recording (tracks: 3, 15)
- James "J. Prince" Smith — executive producer
- Jeff Gilligan — art direction, design
- Pam Francis — photography
- Keith Bardin — photography
- Shawn Mortensen — photography
- Clay Patrick McBride — photography
- Anzel Jennings — A&R, management
- Jeffrey Sledge — A&R
- Rick Martin — management
- Bernard Max Resnick — legal

== Charts ==
=== Weekly charts ===
Chart (2009)	Peak position
US Billboard 200	6
US Top R&B/Hip-Hop Albums (Billboard)	2
US Top Rap Albums (Billboard)	1

=== Year-end charts ===
Chart (2009)	Position
US Billboard 200	191
US Top R&B/Hip-Hop Albums (Billboard)	37
US Top Rap Albums (Billboard)	12
