= Pimpalation =

Studio album by Pimp C
- Released: July 11, 2006
- Recorded: 2005–2006
- Studios: Dean's List House of Hits; M.A.D. Studios (Houston, Texas); Studio 7303 (Houston, Texas); PatchWerk Recording Studios (Atlanta, Georgia)
- Genres: Southern hip hop; gangsta rap
- Length: 69:45
- Labels: Wood Wheel; Rap-A-Lot 4 Life; Asylum
- Producers: J. Prince (also exec.); Pimp C; Mr. Lee; Beat Master Clay D; Jazze Pha; Mike Dean; Cory Mo; Mannie Fresh; Mouse; Myke Diesel; Salih Williams

Pimp C chronology
The Sweet James Jones Stories (2005)	Pimpalation (2006)	The Naked Soul of Sweet Jones (2010)

Singles from Pimpalation
- 1. "I'm Free" Released: 2006; 2. "Pourin' Up" Released: 2006; 3. "Knockin' Doorz Down" Released: 2006

Professional ratings
Review scores
Source	Rating
AllMusic	4/5 stars
HipHopDX	3/5
RapReviews	8/10
Rolling Stone	2.5/5 stars
XXL	3/5 stars

Pimpalation is the second studio album by American rapper Pimp C from UGK. It was released on July 11, 2006, by Rap-A-Lot and Asylum Records, making it the rapper's last solo album to be released during his lifetime. Recording sessions took place at Dean's List House of Hits, at M.A.D. Studios and Studio 7303 in Houston and at PatchWerk Recording Studios in Atlanta. Production was handled by several record producers, including Mr. Lee, Mike Dean, Jazze Pha and Mannie Fresh. The chopped and screwed version of the album was mixed by DJ Michael "5000" Watts. The album features a large number of guest performers, such as 8Ball & MJG, ABN, Ali & Gipp, Big Mike, Bun B, Chamillionaire, J. Prince, Lil' Boosie, Lil' Keke, Mike Jones, Scarface, Slim Thug, Tela, Webbie, and Willie D among others.

The album debuted at number three on the Billboard 200, selling 87,288 copies in its first week of release in the United States, it charted at number one on the Top R&B/Hip-Hop Albums and the Top Rap Albums charts. As of March 8, 2007, the album was certified gold by the Recording Industry Association of America (RIAA) for selling 500,000 copies in the United States.

The album spawned three singles: "I'm Free", "Pourin' Up", and "Knockin' Doorz Down".

The DVD, titled Pimpalation: Return of the Trill, shot and edited by filmmaker REL of REL Entertainment, was released on April 11, 2006. The 1-hour documentary shows Pimp C celebrating his release from prison on December 30, 2005, and his return to the recording studio and stage, working on music and music videos with a host of stars, including Scarface, Z-Ro, Webbie, James Prince, Bun B, Lil' Flip, and Young Jeezy, although the latter of the two didn't appear on the album.

== Track listing ==
No.	Title	Producer(s)	Length
1.	"The Pimp Is Free! (Intro)" (featuring J. Prince)	Mike Dean	1:11
2.	"I'm Free"	Beat Master Clay D; Int'l Red (co.)	3:59
3.	"Knockin' Doorz Down" (featuring P.O.P. and Lil' Keke)	Myke Diesel	4:24
4.	"Rock 4 Rock" (featuring Scarface, Willie D, and Bun B)	Mr. Lee	5:32
5.	"Pourin' Up" (featuring Bun B and Mike Jones)	Salih Williams	4:48
6.	"The Honey" (featuring Jazze Pha, Jody Breeze, and Tela)	Jazze Pha	4:33
7.	"Gitcha Mind Right" (featuring Cory Mo)	Mr. Lee	3:38
8.	"I Don't Fuck wit' U" (featuring Smoke D and Vicious)	Cory Mo	3:34
9.	"Working the Wheel" (featuring Slim Thug and Pimpin Ken)	Mike Dean	4:57
10.	"Bobby & Whitney" (featuring 8Ball & MJG)	Mr. Lee	3:43
11.	"Like That (Remix)" (featuring Lil' Boosie and Webbie)	Mouse	4:00
12.	"Cheat on Yo Man" (featuring Mannie Fresh and Suga)	Mannie Fresh	4:16
13.	"Havin' Thangs '06" (featuring Big Mike)	Pimp C	2:52
14.	"Overstand Me" (featuring Trae and Chamillionaire)	Mr. Lee	4:26
15.	"On Your Mind" (featuring Jagged Edge, Big Zak, Ali, and Gipp)	Jazze Pha	5:31
16.	"I Miss U" (featuring Z-Ro and Tanya Herron)	Beat Master Clay D; Donald Brown; Kendall Jackson	5:26
17.	"Outro"	Pimp C	2:56
Total length:			1:09:45

Sample credits

- Track 2 contains a sample from "Free Fallin'" as performed by Tom Petty.
- Track 7 contains a portion of "Take It Off" as performed by UGK.
- Track 10 contains a portion of "Get Ready for the Get Down" as performed by Willie Hutch.
- Track 13 contains a sample from "Havin Thangs" as performed by Big Mike.
- Track 15 contains a sample from "Don't Say Shit" as performed by UGK.
- Track 16 contains a sample from "I Miss You" as performed by Aaron Hall.

== Personnel ==
- Design – Kevin "Mr. Soul" Harp
- Edited By [Screwed & Chopped] – Michael "5000" Watts (tracks: 2–1 to 2–16)
- Engineer – Avery, Chemist, Cory Mo, Kori Anders, Mike Dean, Mike Mo
- Executive-Producer – J. Prince, Pimp C
- Mastered By – Mike Dean
- Mixed By – Mike Dean (tracks: 1–1, 1–2, 1–4 to 1–10, 1–13, 1–15, 1–16)
- Photography By – Jack Thompson
- Producer – Jazze Pha (tracks: 1–6, 1–14, 2–6, 2–14), Mike Dean (tracks: 1–1, 1–9, 2–1, 2–9), Mr. Lee (tracks: 1–4, 1–7, 1–10, 1–15, 2–4, 2–7, 2–10, 2–15), Pimp C (tracks: 1–13, 1–17, 2–13, 2–17)
- Written By – Chad Butler

== Charts ==
=== Weekly charts ===
Chart (2006)	Peak position
US Billboard 200	3
US Top R&B/Hip-Hop Albums (Billboard)	1
US Top Rap Albums (Billboard)	1
US Indie Store Album Sales (Billboard)	6

=== Year-end charts ===
Chart (2006)	Position
US Top R&B/Hip-Hop Albums (Billboard)	72

== Certifications ==
Region	Certification	Certified units/sales
United States (RIAA)	Gold	500,000^{^}
^{^} Shipments figures based on certification alone.
