= Ridin' Dirty =

Studio album by UGK
- Released: July 30, 1996
- Recorded: 1995–96
- Genre: Southern hip-hop; country rap; trap
- Length: 65:19
- Label: Jive
- Producer: N.O. Joe; Pimp C; Mr. 3-2; Sergio

UGK chronology
Super Tight (1994)	Ridin' Dirty (1996)	Dirty Money (2001)

Ridin' Dirty is the third studio album by American hip-hop duo UGK. It was released on July 30, 1996, by Jive Records. Despite no music videos or official singles being released, it is their best selling album with over 850,000 copies sold to date, with 70,000 copies sold in its first week.

== Critical reception ==
Professional ratings
Review scores
Source	Rating
AllMusic	4.5/5 stars
Pitchfork	9.5/10
RapReviews	10/10

After receiving little attention from national critics upon its release, the album received widespread critical acclaim. Tom Breihan of Stereogum writes that as a producer, Pimp C "absorbed lessons from West Coast producers like Dr. Dre and DJ Quik, putting their cinematic musicality to work".

== Influence ==
The album became one of the most influential albums in Southern hip-hop, especially the Houston hip-hop scene. Prior to his murder in 1996, West Coast rapper Tupac Shakur listened to the album after being introduced to the group by Houston rapper Scarface. Shakur would go on to praise the album.

== Track listing ==
No.	Title	Producer(s)	Length
1.	"Intro" (performed by Smoke D)	Pimp C	1:05
2.	"One Day" (featuring Mr. 3-2 and Ronnie Spencer)	Pimp C; Mr. 3-2 (co.)	5:24
3.	"Murder"	Pimp C	3:52
4.	"Pinky Ring"	Pimp C	5:12
5.	"Diamonds & Wood" (featuring Smoke D)	Pimp C	5:13
6.	"3 In the Mornin'" (featuring C-Note (of Botany Boyz) and Big Smokin' Mitch)	Sergio	5:41
7.	"Touched" (featuring Mr. 3-2)	N.O. Joe	5:04
8.	"Fuck My Car"	N.O. Joe	3:59
9.	"That's Why I Carry" (featuring N.O. Joe)	N.O. Joe	5:38
10.	"Hi-Life"	N.O. Joe; Pimp C (co.)	5:25
11.	"Good Stuff"	Sergio	3:48
12.	"Ridin' Dirty"	Pimp C	5:32
13.	"Outro" (performed by Pimp C)	Pimp C	9:26

Sample credits

- "One Day" contains a sample of "Ain't I Been Good to You" performed by Isley Brothers.
- "Pinky Ring" contains a sample of "Future Shock" performed by Curtis Mayfield.
- "Diamonds & Wood" contains samples of "Munchies for Your Love" performed by Bootsy Collins and "Elbows Swang" performed by .380.
- "3 in the Mornin'" contains samples of "Hyperbolicsyllabicsesquedalymistic" performed by Isaac Hayes and "Look What You Find" performed by George Duke.
- "Good Stuff" contains samples of "Backstrokin'" performed by The Fatback Band and "Money" performed by Pink Floyd.
- "Ridin' Dirty" contains samples of "Mister Mellow" performed by Maynard Ferguson and "Angel" performed by Wes Montgomery.
- "Outro" contains samples of "Munchies for Your Love" performed by Bootsy Collins.

== Charts ==
=== Weekly charts ===
Chart (1996)	Peak position
US Billboard 200	15
US Top R&B/Hip-Hop Albums (Billboard)	2

=== Year-end charts ===
Chart (1996)	Position
US Top R&B/Hip-Hop Albums (Billboard)	45

== Certifications ==
Region	Certification	Certified units/sales
United States (RIAA)	Gold	500,000^{^}
^{^} Shipments figures based on certification alone.
