= Brotherhood Creed =

American hip hop group

Brotherhood Creed was a rap group who were signed to MCA Records in the 1990s. Their self-titled debut album was released in 1992 and scored a number-three hit with the single "Helluva" on the US Rap chart, their single "50/50 Love" also charted on the US R&B chart. In New Zealand their song peaked at number 4 and on the 1992 End of Year Top 50 Singles it was #19

The group appeared on the 1992 Soul Train Music Awards.

== Discography ==
=== Albums ===
Album information
Brotherhood Creed
- Released: 1992
- Chart peak: No. 14 (Billboard Heatseekers)
- Singles: "Helluva", "50/50 Love."

=== Singles ===
Year	Title	Album	Chart positions				
Year	Title	Album	US Hot 100	US R&B	US Rap	NZ	NL
1992	"Helluva"	Brotherhood Creed	53	13	3	4	20
1992	"50/50 Love"	Brotherhood Creed	—	91	—	—	—
