= Trap music =

Subgenre of American hip-hop

- Other names: Trap
- Stylistic origins: Southern hip-hop; gangsta rap; hardcore hip-hop; electro; Memphis rap; crunk; snap; electronic; bounce music; Miami bass; hyphy
- Cultural origins: 1990s, Atlanta, Georgia, U.S.
- Typical instruments: Drum machine; mixer; sampler; sequencer; synthesizer; turntables
- Derivative forms: Afro trap; emo rap; hookah rap; hyperpop; Latin trap; jerk; digicore; sigilkore; cloud rap

Subgenres
- Drill; phonk; plugg; rage; tread; crushed trap

Fusion genres
- Country trap; EDM trap; gqom trap; trap-soul; trap metal; trap-pop; trapfunk; trapnejo; trapeton

Regional scenes
- Africa; Argentina; Brazil; France; Germany; Mexico; Puerto Rico; Russia; Spain; Uruguay; United Kingdom; United States

Local scenes
- Atlanta; Memphis; New Orleans; Houston; Miami; Chicago; Detroit; Birmingham; Liverpool; London; Manchester; Nottingham; Rio de Janeiro; São Paulo; Buenos Aires; San Juan; Madrid

Trap music, also known simply as trap, is a subgenre of hip-hop music that originated in the Southern United States. Lyrical references to trap began appearing in 1991, while the modern sound of trap emerged in 1999. The genre takes its name from the Atlanta term "trap house", a drug house. Trap music features simple, rhythmic, and minimalistic production that uses synthesized drums. It is characterized by drum beats with complex hi-hats, snare drums, and bass drums, some of which are tuned with a long decay to emit a bass frequency, originally from the Roland TR-808 drum machine.

Pioneers of the genre include producers DJ Spanish Fly, DJ Paul & Juicy J, Kurtis Mantronik, Mannie Fresh, Shawty Redd, Fatboi, Zaytoven, DJ Screw, and DJ Toomp, along with rappers T.I., 2 Chainz, Jeezy, and Gucci Mane. The style was popularized by producer Lex Luger, who produced the influential Waka Flocka Flame album Flockaveli in 2010 and co-founded the prolific hip-hop production team 808 Mafia.

Trap became mainstream in the 2010s and has since become one of the most popular forms of American music. Drake, Kendrick Lamar, Future, Playboi Carti, 21 Savage, Migos, Lil Uzi Vert, Post Malone, XXXTentacion, Roddy Ricch, Young Thug, DaBaby, and Travis Scott have all reached number one on the Billboard Hot 100 with songs made in the trap genre. Trap has influenced pop and contemporary R&B artists, including Ariana Grande, Beyoncé, Miley Cyrus, Rihanna, the Weeknd, and Sabrina Carpenter. It has also influenced reggaetón and K-pop. In 2018, hip-hop became the most popular form of music for the first time ever, according to Nielsen Data, coinciding with the rise in popularity of trap. In 2019, trap-influenced hits such as Ariana Grande's "7 Rings" spent eight weeks at number one on the Billboard Hot 100 chart, while the country trap song "Old Town Road" by Lil Nas X (featuring Billy Ray Cyrus) broke the record for the most weeks spent at number one on the Billboard Hot 100 chart and became the fastest song to receive a Diamond certification.

Since the late 2010s and early 2020s, the rage subgenre of trap has emerged, spearheaded by Playboi Carti, Lil Uzi Vert, Trippie Redd, and Yeat.

== Characteristics ==
Trap music employs multilayered, thin- or thick-textured monophonic drones, sometimes with melodic accompaniment expressed through synthesizers; crisp, grimy, and rhythmic snares; deep 808 kick drums; double-time, triple-time, and similarly divided hi-hats; and a cinematic and symphonic use of synthesized string, brass, woodwind, and keyboard instruments to create an energetic, hard-hitting, deep, and varied atmosphere. These primary characteristics, which became the signature sound of trap music, were pioneered by Shawty Redd's minimalist, horror-inspired style and DJ Toomp's melodic, sample-driven approach, drawing inspiration from jazz, soul, R&B, gospel, and funk. Trap may use a range of tempos, often programmed in half-time to achieve finer hi-hat subdivisions, from 50 (100) BPM to 88 (176) BPM, though the tempo of a typical trap beat is around 70 (140) BPM.

== History ==
=== 1990s–2003: origins ===
As hip-hop grew, it created many forms such as gangsta rap, which shone more of a light on the dangerous lifestyle of those in impoverished American neighborhoods, and on political issues. As hip-hop mutated into gangsta rap, gangsta rap would then transform to trap, a new form of music, that followed a different thought process and different tones. Early producers creating trap music included Lil Jon from Atlanta, Georgia, where the term originated as a reference to places where drug deals are made.

Lil Jon, along with Mannie Fresh from New Orleans and DJ Paul & Juicy J from Memphis, Tennessee worked with local acts in Atlanta including Dungeon Family, Outkast, Goodie Mob, and Ghetto Mafia. In 1992, one of the earliest records to release was UGK's "Cocaine In The Back of the Ride" from their debut EP, The Southern Way. Later in 1992, they released the popular "Pocket Full of Stones" from their major-label debut album Too Hard to Swallow. It was also featured in the 1993 film Menace II Society. In 1996, Master P released his single "Mr. Ice Cream Man" from his fifth studio album Ice Cream Man. Fans and critics started to refer to rappers whose primary lyrical topic was drug dealing as "trap rappers". T.I.'s 2001 song "Dope Boyz", from his debut album I'm Serious, includes the lyrics "the dope boyz in the trap nigga / the thug nigga, drug dealer where you at". David Drake of Complex wrote that "the trap in the early 2000s wasn't a genre, it was a real place", and the term was later adopted to describe the "music made about that place".

=== 2003–2015: rise in mainstream popularity ===
During the early- to mid-2000s, trap music began to emerge as a recognized genre after the mainstream success of a number of albums and singles with lyrics that covered life in "the trap", drug dealing and the struggle for success. Several Southern rappers with drug dealer personas such as T.I., Young Jeezy, Gucci Mane, Boosie Badazz, Young Dolph, Lil Wayne, and Rick Ross produced crossover hits and helped expand the popularity of the genre, with trap records beginning to appear more heavily on mixtapes and radio stations outside of the South. Though trap artists were somewhat diverse in their production styles, the signature and quintessential trap sound (typically based around synth, orchestra, and string swells with tight, bass-heavy 808 kick drums) that would come to be associated with the genre developed in Atlanta during trap's mid-2000s breakthrough. Some of the notable trap producers during the mid to late 2000s include DJ Toomp, Fatboi, Drumma Boy, Shawty Redd, D. Rich, and Zaytoven. The first wave of the trap sound was influenced by earlier Southern producers such as Lil Jon, Mannie Fresh, and DJ Paul.

[W]ith the exception of that, before I came in the game, it was Lil Jon, Outkast, Goodie Mob, okay so you had crunk music and you had Organized Noize. There was no such thing as trap music, I created that, I created that. I coined the term, it was my second album, Trap Muzik it dropped in 2003. After that, there was an entire new genre of music created. An open lane for each of you to do what you do, and live your lives, on T.V., and be accepted by the masses. The masses have accepted you 'cause I opened the door and you walked through it. Don't forget who opened that door, cuz.

— Atlanta-based rapper T.I., in a December 2012 interview

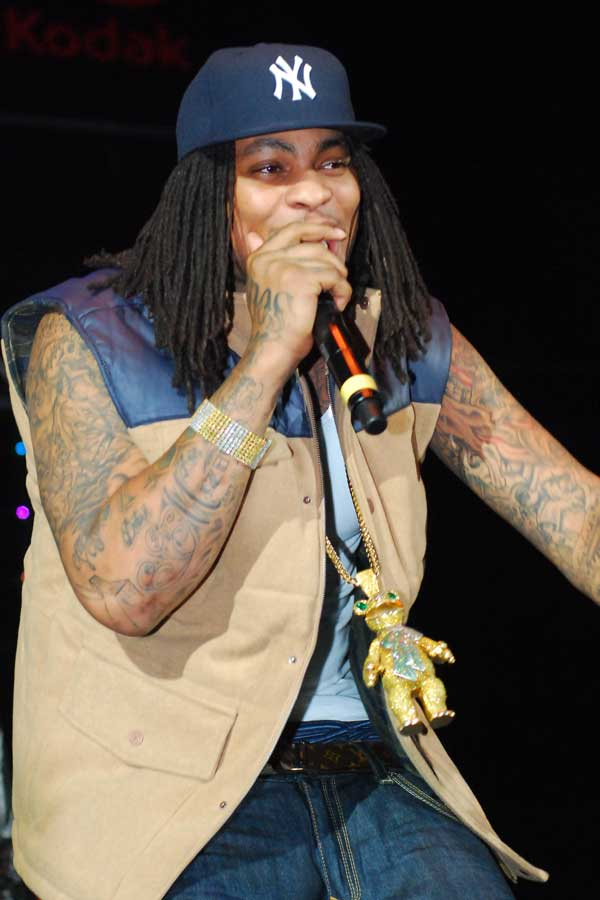
Trap rapper Waka Flocka Flame in 2010.

By the end of the decade, a second wave of trap artists gained momentum and frequently topped the Billboard hip-hop charts. Trap producer Lex Luger gained huge popularity, and produced more than 200 songs in 2010 and 2011, including a number of singles for mainstream rap artists such as Rick Ross' "B.M.F. (Blowin' Money Fast)". Since Luger's rise, his signature trap sound has been the heavy use of 808s, crisp snares, fast hihats, synth keys, and orchestration of brass, strings, woodwind, and keyboards. Many of his sounds have been adopted by other hip-hop producers trying to replicate his success. As such, Luger is often credited with popularizing the modern trap sound. Since the 2010s, an array of modern trap producers have gained industry popularity, most notably 808 Mafia's Southside and TM88, Sonny Digital, Young Chop, DJ Spinz, Tay Keith and Metro Boomin. Some producers expanded their range to other genres, such as contemporary R&B (Mike WiLL Made It) and electronic music (AraabMuzik).

Throughout 2011 and 2012, trap music maintained a strong presence on the mainstream Billboard music charts with a number of records released by rappers such as Young Jeezy, Chief Keef and Future. Jeezy's single "Ballin" reached number 57 on the Billboard charts and was considered one of Jeezy's best tracks in some time. Future's single, "Turn On the Lights", was certified gold and entered at number 50 on the Billboard Hot 100 and Keef's "I Don't Like" and "Love Sosa" generated over 30 million views on YouTube, spawning a new subgenre within trap called drill, or later called Chicago drill following the rise of the less-trap oriented, grime-influenced UK drill. Music critics called drill production style the "sonic cousin to skittish footwork, southern-fried hip-hop and the 808 trigger-finger of trap". Young Chop is frequently identified by critics as the genre's most characteristic producer. The sound of trap producer Lex Luger's music is a major influence on drill, and Young Chop identified Shawty Redd, Drumma Boy and Zaytoven as important precursors to the drill movement. "I Don't Like" inspired fellow Chicago native, notable hip-hop producer and rapper Kanye West to create a remix of the song, which was included on his label GOOD Music's compilation album Cruel Summer. Stelios Phili of GQ called trap music "the sound of hip hop in 2012".

Since maintaining a strong presence on the mainstream music charts, trap music has been influential to non-hip-hop artists. R&B singer Beyoncé's songs "Drunk in Love", "Flawless" and "7/11", all from her 2013 album Beyoncé, also contained trap influences. American dance-pop singer Lady Gaga recorded a trap-inspired song titled "Jewels 'n Drugs" for her 2013 album Artpop, featuring rappers T.I., Too Short and Twista. The combination of pop and trap music was met with mixed responses from critics. In September 2013, American pop singer Katy Perry released a song titled "Dark Horse" featuring rapper Juicy J, from her 2013 album Prism; the song is credited with cementing trap music's place on the Billboard charts. The song reached number one on the Billboard Hot 100 by the end of January 2014.

=== 2015–present: mainstream popularity ===
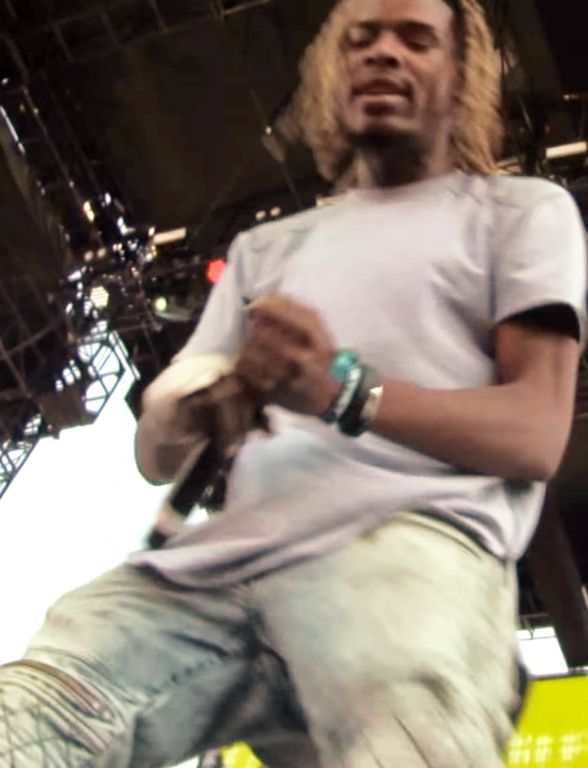
Fetty Wap in August 2015

In May 2015, trap music once again surfaced to the top of mainstream music charts as New Jersey rapper Fetty Wap's hit single "Trap Queen" peaked at number two on the US Billboard Hot 100 chart. Fetty Wap's subsequent singles, "My Way" and "679", also reached the top 10 of the Billboard Hot 100 chart. Brooklyn-based rapper Desiigner gained major recognition in 2016 upon the release of "Panda" as his debut single which topped the US Billboard Hot 100 chart. The commercial success of trap songs also began to be assisted by Internet memes, as was the case with Rae Sremmurd and Gucci Mane's 2016 song "Black Beatles", which reached number-one on the Billboard Hot 100 chart after exposure through the Mannequin Challenge Internet phenomenon. Similarly, in 2017 the collaboration between Migos and Lil Uzi Vert "Bad and Boujee", with the now popularly spread lyrics "Raindrop (drip), Drop top (drop top)" reached number-one after internet meme exposure. 2 Chainz released his fourth studio album Pretty Girls Like Trap Music in June 2017. Rapper Cardi B became extremely popular with her song "Bodak Yellow", which topped the Billboard Hot 100 in 2017.

We're the pop stars. Trap rap is pop now. People's ears have adjusted to what we have to say and how we say it.

— 2 Chainz in a June 2017 interview with Rolling Stone.

In 2013, trap-influenced EDM came into the mainstream, popularized by producer DJ Snake.

In 2015, a new fusion of trap music named Latin trap began to emerge. Spain was the first Spanish-speaking country to make trap music, with performers as the music group PXXR GVNG, formed by Yung Beef, Kaydy Cain, Khaled and the producer Steve Lean, who was a part of 808 Mafia. Latin trap is similar to mainstream trap in its themes of la calle (the streets), hustling, sex, and drugs. Prominent artists of Latin trap include Bryant Myers, Anuel AA, Miky Woodz, Almighty, Maluma and Bad Bunny. In July 2017, The Fader wrote "Rappers from Puerto Rico have taken elements of trap—the lurching bass lines, jittering 808s and the eyes-half-closed vibe—and infused them into banger after banger." In an August 2017 article for Billboard's series, "A Brief History Of", they enlisted some of the key artists of Latin trap, including Ozuna, De La Ghetto, Bad Bunny, Farruko and Arcángel—to narrate a brief history on the genre. Elias Leight of Rolling Stone noted "[Jorge] Fonseca featured Puerto Rican artists like Anuel AA, Bryant Myers and Noriel on the compilation Trap Capos: Season 1, which became the first "Latin trap" LP to reach number one on Billboard's Latin Rhythm Albums chart." A remixed version of Cardi B's single "Bodak Yellow" (which had previously reached number one on the US Billboard Hot 100 chart), dubbed the "Latin Trap Remix", was officially released on August 18, 2017, and features Cardi B rapping in Spanish with Dominican hip-hop recording artist Messiah contributing a guest verse. In November 2017, Rolling Stone wrote that "a surging Latin trap sound is responding to more recent developments as it fuses with Reggaeton, embracing the slow-rolling rhythms and gooey vocal delivery popularized by Southern hip-hop".

On 5 May 2018, rapper and musician Childish Gambino released "This Is America", which is "built on the sharp contrast between jolly, syncretic melodies and menacing trap cadences". It debuted at number 1 on the Billboard Hot 100 and was streamed over 65 million times in the first week of its release.

In 2018, in promotion for his album Dime Trap, T.I. opened a pop-up Trap Music Museum in Atlanta: "We curated it from conception. The purpose of it was to acknowledge the most significant contributors to the culture. Secondly, inform those who may be least knowledgeable about the genre. And inspire those who are in the environment that inspires the genre." The museum also includes an escape room entitled 'Escape the Trap'.

In 2019, Lil Nas X's "Old Town Road" crossed trap with Western and country music. In March 2019, the song debuted at number 19 on the Hot Country Songs before being removed from the chart a week later. A remix with Billy Ray Cyrus was released on April 5, 2019, and later became the longest-running number one hip-hop single of all time and the overall longest consecutive number one single of all time on the Billboard Hot 100, at 19 weeks, surpassing the record set by Mariah Carey and Boyz II Men's "One Sweet Day" and Luis Fonsi and Daddy Yankee's "Despacito" featuring Justin Bieber.

=== 2020s–present: mainstream decline and rise of rage and underground rap ===
In the 2020s, rage, a subgenre of trap, developed into heavily commercialized scene. The style was popularized by Playboi Carti's 2020 album Whole Lotta Red, which topped the Billboard 200 and was later cited as one of the most influential albums of the decade. The album helped popularize rage as a subgenre, with Playboi Carti being credited as a progenitor of rage, alongside fellow rappers Trippie Redd, Lil Uzi Vert, and Yeat. The late XXXTentacion was also credited by Trippie Redd as a pioneer of the genre. The rise of rage came at around the same time that the SoundCloud era rap scene was declining, with artists such as the aformentioned Lil Uzi Vert and Lil Yachty, who both rose to fame with the Soundcloud era, shifting and evolving their sound to adapt to tbe newer style of trap that had emerged.

As a result of the commercialization of rage, the underground hip-hop heavily configured itself towards rage and jerk music. Members of Playboi Carti's Opium record label, namely Ken Carson, Destroy Lonely, and HXG all released rage projects, which helped the label gain a cult following. Beginning in 2024, artists such as OsamaSon, Nettspend, Che, Slayr, and Bleood all rose to prominence within the underground rap scene, particularly with rage music. New York rapper Xaviersobased, alongside his collective 1c34, helped popularize jerk music within the underground.

During the rise of the underground rap scene, mainstream hip-hop, particularly trap music, was widely described to have gone into decline, mainly due to creative stagnation and decline in both chart performance and critic reviews.

== Related genres ==
=== Trap pop ===
"Trap pop" (also known as "pop-trap") is a fusion of trap and pop. Trap had entered the pop mainstream by the mid-2010s, and by 2019–2020 had become a "newly viable production technique for pop artists", accompanying lyrics about typical pop subjects such as fame, love, loss, and sex. Rolling Stone writers considered trap one of the biggest influences on 2010s pop music; Brittany Spanos wrote that "attempting to make a trap-pop single became requisite for a hit", with artists including Katy Perry and Lady Gaga drawing on the genre's syncopated beats. In 2024, music scholar Steven Gamble wrote that "pop music's adoption of trap's musical and visual aesthetics is both thoroughly normalized and contested online."

In 2013, the band Jamaican Queens described their music as "trap pop" because they had been listening to trap while making an experimental pop album. The same year, Miley Cyrus collaborated with trap producer Mike Will Made It on her album Bangerz, whose trap-pop production, according to Spanos, gave Cyrus's pop sound a "sharper, heavier, and surprising edge." The album includes the trap-pop song "Do My Thang", which features Cyrus rapping. Taylor Swift's album Reputation (2017) has also been described as featuring trap-pop production.

Ariana Grande's albums Sweetener (2018), Thank U, Next (2019), and Positions (2020) feature midtempo trap-pop production. On Sweetener, Grande worked with Tommy Brown, whose trap-pop production on the album incorporates "booming, ironclad beats". "God Is a Woman", a trap-pop song from Sweetener, features triplet flow-influenced singing popularized by trap music, and the album's closing track, "Break Up with Your Girlfriend, I'm Bored", is a trap-pop song with lyrics portraying the narrator as a "bad girl" trying to steal another woman's partner. Thank U, Next includes "7 Rings", a trap-pop song that uses numerous features associated with trap; Gamble analyzed "7 Rings" in relation to non-Black artists' use of "sonic Blackness", writing that the song "symbolizes Blackness" through its trap sound, AAVE-influenced lyrics, and visual imagery.

The sound continued into the 2020s. KSI's album Dissimulation (2020) features "trap-pop genre tropes" such as "drugs, money, objectification, ad libs." Other examples include Blackpink's song "How You Like That" (2020), Lil Nas X's song "Holiday" (2020), several songs from Juice Wrld's album Fighting Demons (2021), Lil Tecca's album Tec (2023), and Tate McRae's albums Think Later (2023) and So Close to What (2025). Jaeden Pinder from Pitchfork wrote that Think Later is "undeniably indebted to Bangerz and the 2010s obsession with trap-pop".

=== Bubblegum rap ===
"Bubblegum rap" consists of a "booming, trap-laden" beat with "flavorful" elements and mumble rap. It is also described as "ushering in a new wave of Internet-born music stars".

== See also ==
- Snap music
- Crunk music
