= Sweet James Jones Stories =

The Sweet James Jones Stories

Studio album by Pimp C
- Released: March 1, 2005
- Recorded: 2004
- Studios: Dean's List House of Hits; Hiroshima Studios; Noddfactor Studios (Denton, Texas)
- Genres: Southern hip hop; gangsta rap
- Length: 60:57
- Labels: J. Prince; Rap-A-Lot 4 Life; Asylum
- Producers: Mike Dean; Dani Kartel; Cory Mo; DJ DMD; Mr. Lee; D. Stone; John Bido; N.O. Joe; Pimp C; T. Gray; Wendell Springer

Pimp C chronology
The Sweet James Jones Stories (2005)	Pimpalation (2006)

Singles from The Sweet James Jones Stories
- 1. "I'sa Playa" Released: 2005

Professional ratings
Review scores
Source	Rating
AllMusic	3/5 stars
RapReviews	8.5/10

The Sweet James Jones Stories is the debut solo studio album by American rapper Pimp C. It was released on March 1, 2005, through J. Prince Entertainment, Rap-A-Lot Records, and Asylum Records. Recording sessions took place at Dean's List House of Hits, Noddfactor Studios and Hiroshima Studios. Composed of fourteen tracks, the production was handled by eleven record producers, including Mike Dean, Mr. Lee and N.O. Joe. The album features guest appearances from ABN, Bun B, Cory Mo, Devin the Dude, Lil' Flip and Twista.

There also exists a bootleg version of the album, with a slightly different track listing, recorded by Pimp C while he was in jail.

== Track listing ==
No.	Title	Writer(s)	Producer(s)	Length
1.	"Hogg in the Game"	C. Butler; L. Williams Jr.	Mr. Lee; Pimp C	3:10
2.	"Swang Down / 10 a Key"	C. Butler; J. Bido; W. Springer	John Bido; Wendell Springer	4:29
3.	"I'm a Hustler"	C. Butler; M. Dean; D. Durriseu	Mike Dean; D. Stone	4:19
4.	"Coming Up" (featuring Lil' Flip & Z-Ro)	C. Butler; J. McVey; W. Weston; D. Dorsey	DJ DMD	4:57
5.	"I'sa Playa" (featuring Bun B, Twista & Z-Ro)	C. Butler; J. McVey; B. Freeman; C. Mitchell; J. Johnson	N.O. Joe	4:37
6.	"I Know U Strapped"	C. Butler; L. Williams Jr.	Mr. Lee	5:08
7.	"I Gotta Thang"	C. Butler; M. Dean; D. Castillo	Mike Dean; Dani Kartel	5:37
8.	"Slow Down" (featuring Cory Mo)	C. Butler; M. Dean; C. Moore; T. Gray	Mike Dean; Cory Mo; T. Gray	5:19
9.	"Get My Money"	C. Butler; D. Castillo	Dani Kartel	2:47
10.	"Young Prostitute"	C. Butler; M. Dean; D. Brown	Mike Dean	3:54
11.	"Everytime" (featuring Devin the Dude)	C. Butler; D. Copeland; D. Castillo	Dani Kartel	4:29
12.	"A Thin Line"	C. Butler; C. Moore; D. Castillo	Dani Kartel; Cory Mo	3:56
13.	"My Angel"	C. Butler; C. Moore; M. Dean; A. Winbush	Mike Dean; Cory Mo	3:50
14.	"Young Ghetto Stars" (featuring ABN)	C. Butler; J. McVey; F. Thompson; D. Dorsey	DJ DMD	4:25
Total length:				1:00:57

== Personnel ==
- Chad Lamont Butler – main artist, producer (track 1), A&R
- Joseph Wayne McVey IV – featured artist (tracks: 4, 5, 14)
- Wesley Eric Weston Jr. – featured artist (track 4)
- Bernard James Freeman – featured artist (track 5), executive producer
- Carl Terrell Mitchell – featured artist (track 5)
- Cory Moore – featured artist (track 8), producer (tracks: 8, 12, 13)
- Devin Copeland – featured artist (track 11)
- Frazier Othel Thompson III – featured artist (track 14)
- Michael George Dean – producer (tracks: 3, 7, 8, 10, 13), mixing, mastering
- Daniel Castillo – producer (tracks: 7, 9, 11, 12)
- Leroy Williams Jr. – producer (tracks: 1, 6)
- Dorie Lee Dorsey – producer (tracks: 4, 14)
- Wendell Springer – producer (track 2)
- John Okuribido – producer (track 2)
- DeJuan Dee Durriseau – producer (track 3)
- Joseph Johnson – producer (track 5)
- Terius Gray – producer (track 8)
- James A. Smith – executive producer
- "Riley B" Broussard – production coordinator
- Anzel U. Jennings – A&R
- Tony Randle – A&R

== Charts ==
Chart (2005)	Peak position
US Billboard 200	50
US Top R&B/Hip-Hop Albums (Billboard)	7
US Top Rap Albums (Billboard)	3
