= Pimp C =

American rapper (1973–2007)

- Pimp C in 2006

Background information
- Also known as: Sweet James Jones; Tony Snow; Percy Mack; Jack Tripper
- Born: Chad Lamont Butler; December 29, 1973; Crowley, Louisiana, U.S.
- Origin: Port Arthur, Texas, U.S.
- Died: December 4, 2007 (aged 33) West Hollywood, California, U.S.
- Genres: Southern hip-hop; dirty rap
- Occupations: Rapper; singer; songwriter; record producer
- Works: Solo discography; UGK discography
- Years active: 1987–2007
- Labels: Atlantic; Rap-A-Lot; Asylum; Jive; Trill Entertainment

Chad Lamont Butler (December 29, 1973 – December 4, 2007), better known by his stage name Pimp C, was an American rapper and record producer. He was best known for his work with Bun B as one half of the hip-hop duo Underground Kingz (UGK).

Signing with Jive Records in 1992, UGK released their major-label debut studio album Too Hard to Swallow to critical acclaim. Their subsequent albums, Super Tight (1994) and Ridin' Dirty (1996), both entered the Billboard 200. The group received national attention after appearing on Jay-Z's 2000 single "Big Pimpin'", which peaked at number 18 on the Billboard Hot 100.

The group went on hiatus for the first half of the 2000s after Pimp C was sentenced to eight years in prison for a probation violation. During this time, both members pursued solo careers, with Pimp C releasing his solo debut, The Sweet James Jones Stories, in 2005, composed of material recorded prior to his sentencing. After being released from prison in December 2005, he released his second solo album, Pimpalation, in 2006. UGK released their eponymous fifth studio album (2007); it spawned the single "International Players Anthem (I Choose You)" (featuring OutKast), which peaked at number 70 on the Billboard Hot 100.

Pimp C was found dead in his hotel room on December 4, 2007, with a coroner's report attributing his death to complications following a fatal interaction between his heavy consumption of lean and his pre-existing sleep apnea.

== Early life ==
Chad Lamont Butler was born on December 29, 1973, in Crowley, Louisiana, but was raised in Port Arthur, Texas. Butler was the only child of Charleston Butler and Weslyn "Mama Wes" Butler Jacob Monroe. Butler was born prematurely and had numerous health issues, including a birth defect that caused his legs to point inward, which required braces to fix. He also had to be propped up when he slept due to digestive problems. His eyesight was poor, and he almost went blind after a severe bout of pinkeye. Butler also had pneumonia at least nine times as a child.

As the son of a trumpet player, Butler had an interest in music since childhood: "I come from a classical background, I came up singing Italian sonnets, Negro spirituals, and shit of that nature." Even before studying musical notation in school, he learned to play many instruments by ear, including piano, trumpet, drums and flugelhorn. His vocal style was once described as "high-voiced, unstable and provocateur, as likely to slap your face as to sing you a love song." Influenced by Run-DMC, he started synthesizing beats to rap over after receiving a drum machine and keyboard one Christmas.

Butler joined the choir as a teenager and played numerous instruments at school, and after being encouraged by his stepfather Bill Monroe, began writing and creating his own music. Butler was particularly interested in the emerging hip hop genre as a child, and soon bonded and became friends with Bernard "Bun B" Freeman over their shared passion for music.

He dropped out of high school during his senior year to focus on his career with UGK.

== Career ==
=== UGK ===
==== Early career (1987–1996) ====
Butler formed the rap group Underground Kingz (often referred to as UGK) with friend Bernard "Bun B" Freeman in 1987 in Port Arthur, Texas. Initially signed to independent label Big Tyme Recordz, the duo released two EPs, The Southern Way and Banned, in 1992 to moderate local success, which lead to the group being signed to Jive Records later that year. In November, they released their major label debut, Too Hard to Swallow through Jive, which peaked at No. 37 on the US Top R&B/Hip-Hop Albums chart.

UGK's second album, Super Tight was released in 1994 to critical acclaim and commercial success, charting at No. 95 on the Billboard 200 and No. 9 on the Top R&B/Hip-Hop Albums chart. In 1996, UGK's third album, Ridin' Dirty, became their most successful, reaching No. 2 on the Billboard Top R&B/Hip-Hop Albums chart and No. 15 on the Billboard 200, receiving widespread critical acclaim and commercial success, having sold 850,000 copies to date.

==== Hiatus and national attention (1996–2001) ====
After taking a short hiatus from music in the late 1990s, UGK returned in 2000, appearing on Jay-Z's smash hit single "Big Pimpin'", which peaked at No. 18 on the Billboard 200, as well as "Sippin' on Some Syrup" by Three 6 Mafia, which peaked at No. 30 on the US Hot R&B/Hip-Hop Songs. Both of these collaborations greatly increased the duo's reputation, and helped fuel anticipation for their next project. Jive Records failed to capitalize on this new-found interest in UGK, as their fourth album, Dirty Money, was released in 2001 with little to no advertisement or promotion.

==== Prison sentence and solo career (2002–2006) ====
After Pimp C was sentenced to eight years in prison in August 2002, UGK was once again forced to go on hiatus, which led to both members pursuing solo careers. Pimp C's debut studio album, The Sweet James Jones Stories was released in March 2005, composed of material recorded prior to Pimp C's incarceration. Pimp C secured for his GED while in prison. After being released from prison in December 2005, Pimp C released his second solo studio album Pimpalation in July 2006 and peaked at No. 3 on the US Billboard 200 and topped the US Hot R&B/Hip-Hop Albums chart.

==== UGK Reunited ====
On August 7, 2007, UGK reunited to release their eponymous fifth studio album, debuting at No. 1 on both the Billboard 200 and Hot R&B/Hip-Hop charts. The album was the last UGK album released during Pimp C's lifetime, and spawned the hit single "International Players Anthem (I Choose You)", and received universal acclaim from critics.

== Personal life ==
Butler married his wife, Chinara, while he was in prison in 2003. He also earned his GED.

== Legal issues ==
On December 16, 2000, Butler was arrested in Houston's Sharpstown Mall after allegedly holding a woman, Lakita Hulett, at gunpoint and threatening to shoot her after a confrontation in a shoe store. After both Butler and Hulett had exchanged words in the store, Hulett alleged that Butler pushed a gun into her side and said, "Bitch, I'll shoot you," before she ran away and informed police. Butler claimed he simply lifted his jacket to show the gun and did not remove it from his waistband.

As Butler attempted to exit the mall and enter his car, numerous officers surrounded him and instructed him to surrender. Butler ignored the orders and was forced to the ground by officers, who handcuffed him and brought him back into the mall. Shortly after, Butler was transported to Houston Central Jail where he was charged with aggravated assault with a deadly weapon. Butler claimed police used excessive force to restrain him, and alleged they knocked him unconscious twice and refused to let doctors at a local hospital perform a routine CT scan, instead transporting him straight to jail.

Butler posted $10,000 bail the following day and was initially sentenced to probation after pleading no contest in early 2001. He was sent back to prison in January 2002 after failing to report to his probation officer on several occasions, failing to keep up with his community service hours or pay outstanding court fees, as well as testing positive twice for marijuana. On August 5, 2002, Butler was sentenced to eight years in prison.

His arrest was widely protested by the hip-hop community, who along with Bun B immediately initiated a grassroots "Free Pimp C" campaign. Butler spent the later portion of his sentence at the Terrell Unit in Brazoria County, Texas, where he would earn his GED. He was transferred to the Huntsville Unit a week prior to his release. On December 30, 2005, Butler was released from prison and placed on parole until December 2009.

== Death ==
In early December 2007, Butler was staying at the Mondrian Hotel in West Hollywood, California, where he was working on new music and performing with Too $hort. On the morning of December 4, 2007, he was scheduled to fly back home. After not hearing from him, his wife, Chinara, called the hotel and requested that they check on him. Hotel staff discovered Butler unresponsive in his hotel room, where he was pronounced dead shortly after. He was 33 years old at the time.

The coroner's report ruled that Butler's death was accidental, attributing it to a fatal interaction between the effects of his heavy usage of "lean", a combination of codeine and promethazine, in conjunction with his pre-existing condition of sleep apnea.

Butler referred to lean many times in his music.

According to DJ Paul of Three 6 Mafia, Butler's manager Rick Martin described seeing the rapper's body "laying down like he was praying but there was blood around like he was shot." He further stated: "He was knelt down like he was praying and the candles were all the way burnt down, so they knew he'd probably been dead for a day or so because he always lit those candles to sleep. He lit those big tall candles and they had been burnt down so he probably was dead for a while."

Butler's body was transported back to his hometown of Port Arthur, Texas, where his funeral was held at the Bob Bowers Civic Center on December 13, 2007. Port Arthur mayor Deloris Prince, Butler's mother Weslyn Monroe, and Bun B were among the speakers at the service. He was buried at Greenlawn Memorial Park in Jefferson County.

=== Tributes ===
Numerous rappers paid tribute to Butler after his death. Bun B honored his cohort on songs such as "You're Everything" and "Pop It 4 Pimp" on his 2008 album II Trill, while UGK's final album, UGK 4 Life, was released in 2009. Lil' Flip released a tribute song, "RIP Pimp C", two days after Butler's death, and in 2008, Lil Wayne released a single titled “Me and My Drank”. A$AP Rocky has cited Pimp C as one of his major influences, while Megan Thee Stallion titled her 2018 EP Tina Snow after Butler's alter ego Tony Snow.

== Discography ==
Studio albums

- The Sweet James Jones Stories (2005)
- Pimpalation (2006)

Posthumous studio albums

- The Naked Soul of Sweet Jones (2010)
- Still Pimping (2011)
- Long Live the Pimp (2015)

== Documentaries ==
- Pimpalation - Return of the Trill Rap-A-Lot/Wood Wheel Records/REL Entertainment (2006)
- The Final Chapter Rap-A-Lot/Wood Wheel Records/REL Entertainment (2008)
