= Too Hard to Swallow =

Studio album by UGK
- Released: November 10, 1992
- Recorded: 1991–92
- Genre: Southern hip-hop
- Length: 57:43
- Label: Jive
- Producer: UGK; Bernie Bismark; Shetoro Henderson; Russell Washington (exec.)

UGK chronology
Banned (1992)	Too Hard to Swallow (1992)	Super Tight (1994)

Professional ratings
Review scores
Source	Rating
AllMusic	3.5/5 stars
RapReviews	10/10

Too Hard to Swallow is the debut studio album by American hip-hop duo UGK. It was released on November 10, 1992, by Jive Records.

== Track listing ==
No.	Title	Length
1.	"Something Good"	5:27
2.	"Use Me Up"	4:29
3.	"Pocket Full of Stones"	6:09
4.	"Short Texas"	6:18
5.	"Cocaine in the Back of the Ride"	3:44
6.	"It's Too Hard to Swallow"	5:19
7.	"Cramping My Style" (featuring Infinity)	4:45
8.	"Feel Like I'm the One Who's Doin' Dope"	6:17
9.	"I'm So Bad"	3:34
10.	"Trill Ass Nigga"	4:26
11.	"976-Bun B"	2:48
12.	"Something Good (Pimp C's Remix)" (bonus track)	4:34

Sample credits

- "Something Good" contains samples from "Tell Me Something Good" performed by Rufus, and "Summer Breeze" performed by the Isley Brothers.
- "Use Me Up" contains a sample from "Use Me" performed by Bill Withers.
- "Pockets Full of Stones" contains samples from "Going Back to Cali" performed by LL Cool J, and "Gettin' Funky in the Joint" performed by Mellow Man Ace.
- "Cocaine in the Back of the Ride" contains a sample from "Freddie's Dead" performed by Curtis Mayfield.
- "Cramping My Style" contains samples from "Between the Sheets" performed by the Isley Brothers.
- "Feel Like I'm the One Who's Doin' Dope" contains a sample from "Mind Playing Tricks on Me" performed by the Geto Boys.
- "I'm So Bad" contains a sample from "I Turned You On" performed by the Isley Brothers.
- "976-Bun B" contains a sample from "Fly Like an Eagle" performed by Steve Miller Band.

== Chart positions ==
Chart (1992)	Peak position
US Top R&B/Hip-Hop Albums (Billboard)	37
US Heatseekers Albums (Billboard)	14
