= UGK =

American hip-hop duo

- Bun B (left) and Pimp C in 2007

Background information
- Also known as: Underground Kingz
- Origin: Port Arthur, Texas, U.S.
- Genres: Southern hip-hop; country rap; trap; gospel rap
- Years active: 1987–2007
- Label: Jive
- Past members: Bun B; Pimp C (deceased); Big Mitch
- Website: www.the-ugks.com

UGK (short for Underground Kingz) was an American hip-hop duo from Port Arthur, Texas, formed in 1987 by Mitchell "Big Mitch" Queen and Chad "Pimp C" Butler. Big Mitch later left the group to pursue a football career, and was replaced with Bernard "Bun B" Freeman, although Mitch remained a frequent collaborator of the duo.

They released their first major-label album, Too Hard to Swallow, in 1992, followed by several other charting releases on the Billboard 200 and Top R&B/Hip-Hop Albums charts, including their fifth album, Underground Kingz (2007), which spawned the hit single "International Players Anthem (I Choose You)" (featuring Outkast) and debuted atop the Billboard 200, in August 2007. The duo also appeared on singles for other artists, such as "Big Pimpin'" by Jay-Z and "Sippin' on Some Syrup" by Three 6 Mafia. Pimp C founded UGK Records in late 2005. The duo ended following Pimp C's death on December 4, 2007.

== Background ==
Originally from Port Arthur, Texas, UGK members Pimp and Bun were from the same town as Janis Joplin and Robert Rauschenberg. Though the town of 60,000 has a significant African American population, it was not known for its rap scene. They called themselves "Underground Kingz" because their country rap style was so full of "slang and twang" they thought it was inaccessible for outsiders. UGK blended "deep bluesy textures, triumphant church organs, thick funk and meaty soul".

Bun's rap style was described as a "speeding-train delivery" with lyrics that "feel sanded-down and coated by heavy lacquer". Born Bernard Freeman, his childhood nickname "Bunny" was shortened to Bun.

Pimp, or Chad Butler, is the son of a trumpet player and has had an interest in music since childhood: "I come from a classical background, I came up singing Italian sonnets, Negro spirituals, and shit of that nature." Even before studying musical notation in school he learned to play many instruments by ear including piano, trumpet, drums and flugelhorn. His vocal style is of a "high-voiced, unstable and provocateur, as likely to slap your face as to sing you a love song". Influenced by Run-DMC, he started synthesizing beats to rap over after receiving a drum machine and keyboard one Christmas. Following the advice of Pimp's stepfather to "put some music in that shit", Pimp decided to move beyond Run-DMC's kick-snare formula also known as boom bap, building on this by replacing the drum sound specifically with the Roland TR-808 and supplementing the cymbals with mainly the hi-hats, which added another important rhythmic layer to the whole thing..

== Career and recordings ==
In 1992, UGK was signed to Jive Records under a five-album contract, releasing their major-label debut album Too Hard to Swallow. While it featured several new recordings, it also featured several songs that had been culled from The Southern Way. However, several songs that had been intended to be included on the album were excised at the last minute, apparently due to their overly explicit content. Five of these songs would surface two months before the release of Too Hard to Swallow, on an EP distributed by Bigtyme Recordz; appropriately enough, the EP was titled Banned. A popular song from the album, "Pocket Full of Stones", was also included on the Menace II Society soundtrack in 1993.

Their second album, Super Tight, was released two years later, on August 30. Unlike their previous album, Super Tight managed to break into the Billboard 200 and ultimately peaked at #95; their third album, Ridin' Dirty, peaked at number 15. Ridin' Dirty would also be UGK's last album for the time being, as they went on a five-year hiatus not long afterward.

The year 2000 became a breakthrough year for the group. UGK made a high-profile guest appearance on Jay-Z's smash hit "Big Pimpin'" and also appeared on Three 6 Mafia's hit "Sippin' on Some Syrup". Both of these collaborations greatly increased their reputation, and helped fuel anticipation for their next project. Jive Records failed to capitalize on this new-found interest in the duo, as their fourth album, 2001's Dirty Money, came and went with little fanfare.

Further problems arose when Pimp C was incarcerated for an aggravated gun assault charge in 2002. Throughout the time of his incarceration, Bun B carried on the UGK name by making numerous guest appearances on songs by other artists, with every appearance either mentioning Pimp C or featuring a "Free Pimp C!" or "Free the Pimp" chant. Many of UGK's peers did the same, and mentioned Pimp C in their own songs with or without Bun B. During this period, Jive Records released a Best of UGK album, as well as a Chopped & Screwed remix album. As a result of Pimp C's incarceration, both members of UGK began solo careers out of necessity.

Rap-A-Lot Records released Pimp C's solo debut, Sweet James Jones Stories, on March 1, 2005. Bun B later released his own solo foray, Trill, on October 18, 2005. It opened at number 6 on the Billboard 200, and also peaked at number 1 on Billboard's Top R&B/Hip-Hop Albums chart.

On December 30, 2005, Pimp C was released from prison and was to be on parole until December 2009. He released his first post-incarceration album, titled Pimpalation, on July 25, 2006.

On August 7, 2007, the group released their fifth studio album, the self-titled Underground Kingz. It was a double album, containing 26 tracks and spanning two discs. Featured guests included Talib Kweli, Too Short, Rick Ross, Z-RO, Three 6 Mafia, Slim Thug, OutKast, as well as hip-hop legends Kool G Rap and Big Daddy Kane on a Marley Marl-produced track titled "Next Up". The album also featured British rapper Dizzee Rascal on the track "Two Types of Bitches", following UGK's guest appearance in Rascal's own album Maths + English for the track "Where's Da G's". The album featured production by DJ Paul & Juicy J, Jazze Pha, Swizz Beatz, The Runners, Lil Jon, fellow Texas legend Scarface, and Pimp C. DJ Paul and Juicy J produced the second single, "International Player's Anthem (I Choose You)".

The album got a positive reception, both commercially and critically. It received a 4-star rating from AllMusic, and reached number 1 on the Billboard 200 albums chart. "International Player's Anthem (I Choose You)" became the group's only single to chart on the Billboard Hot 100 pop charts, where it peaked at number 70.

=== 2007–2009: Death of Pimp C and breakup ===
On December 4, 2007, Pimp C was found dead at the Mondrian Hotel in West Hollywood, California, after Los Angeles County Fire Department responded to a 9-1-1 call. They arrived to his sixth-floor hotel room to find him dead in bed. This was three days after he performed with Too Short at the House of Blues in Los Angeles.

Bun B was interviewed a few days later by radio DJ Madd Hatta, and an audio recording has been posted online.

In 2008, Bun B stated in an interview that there would be one last UGK album released, before he permanently becomes a solo act: "Yea, we’re still putting together this last UGK record too, because there’s a lot of music that we’ve already recorded for it," said Bun B. "I think that album itself is going to be a little bit weird." UGK 4 Life was released in 2009.

== Style and influences ==
Bun B said that they grew up listening to the Geto Boys, Eric B and Rakim, N.W.A and A Tribe Called Quest. UGK (most notably Pimp C) has also influenced other rappers such as Big Boi of OutKast, Boosie Badazz and Paul Wall.

== Discography ==
Studio albums

- Too Hard to Swallow (1992)
- Super Tight (1994)
- Ridin' Dirty (1996)
- Dirty Money (2001)
- Underground Kingz (2007)
- UGK 4 Life (2009)

== Awards ==
Year	Nominee / work	Award	Result
BET Awards
2008	"International Players Anthem" (featuring Outkast)	Video of the Year	Won
2008	UGK	Best Group	Won
BET Hip Hop Awards
2007	"International Players Anthem" (featuring Outkast)	Best Collabo, Duo or Group	Won
2007	"International Players Anthem" (featuring Outkast)	Best Hip Hop Video	Nominated
Grammy Awards
2001	"Big Pimpin'" (with Jay-Z)	Best Rap Performance By a Duo or Group	Nominated
2008	"International Players Anthem" (featuring Outkast)	Best Rap Performance By a Duo or Group	Nominated
Ozone Awards
2006	UGK	Legend Award	Won
2008	UGK	Best Group	Won
2008	"International Players Anthem" (featuring Outkast)	Best Video	Won
2008	Underground Kingz	Best Album	Nominated
