= Bun B =

American rapper (born 1973)

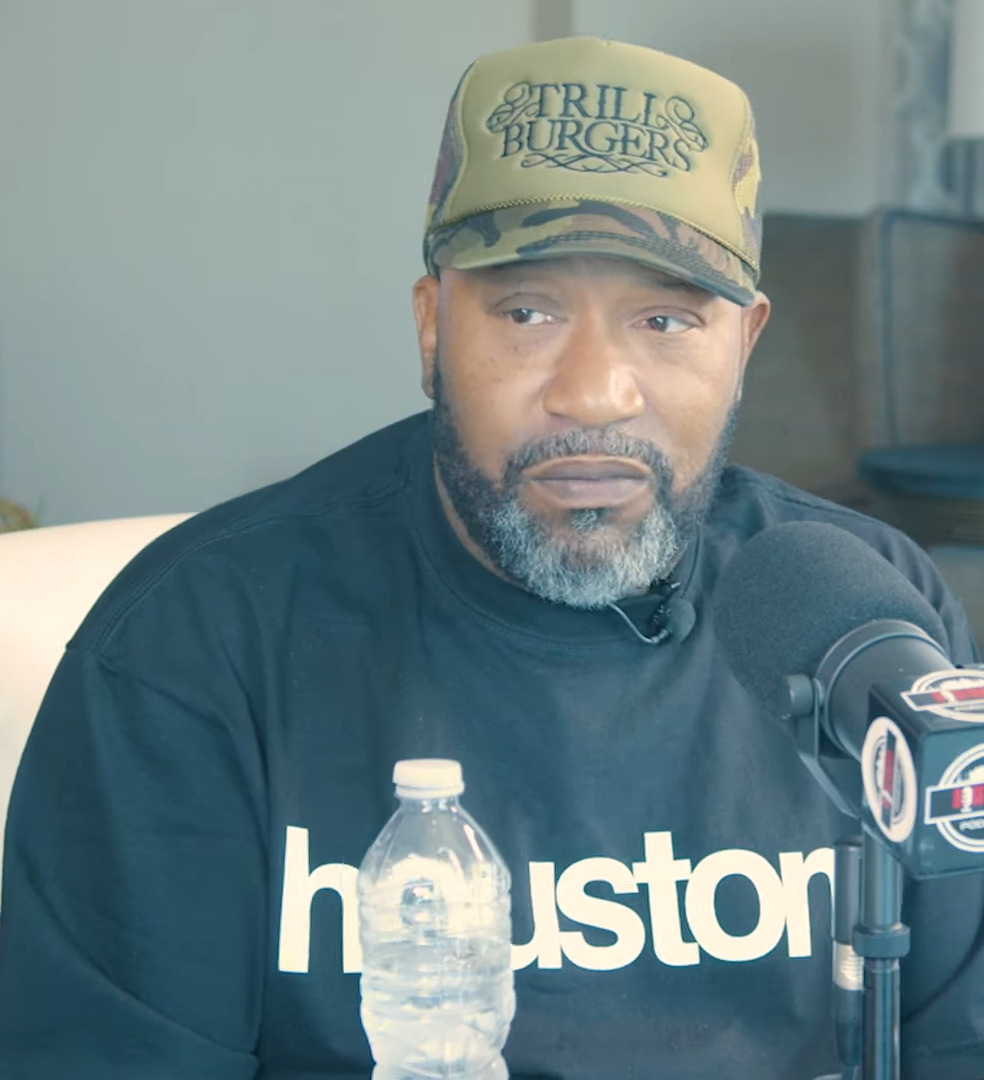
- Bun B in 2025

Background information
- Also known as: Big Bun
- Born: Bernard James Freeman; March 19, 1973 (age 53); Houston, Texas, U.S.
- Origin: Port Arthur, Texas, U.S.
- Genres: Southern hip-hop
- Occupations: Rapper; songwriter; actor
- Works: Solo; UGK
- Years active: 1987–present
- Labels: Double Dose; II Trill; Rap-A-Lot; Universal Motown; Warner Bros.; Jive; Asylum; Atlantic; Trill
- Formerly of: UGK
- Spouse: Angela "Queenie" Wells (m. 2003)

Bernard James Freeman (born March 19, 1973), known professionally as Bun B is an American rapper. He is best known as one half of the Southern rap duo UGK (Underground Kingz), which he formed in 1987 alongside Pimp C. Aside from his work with UGK, Bun B has released five solo albums, including 2010's Trill OG, which received the rare 5-mic rating from The Source.

== Life and career ==
=== UGK ===
In the late 1980s, Pimp C started the rap duo UGK. He first released a demo tape titled "Underground King" which didn't feature Bun B on the track. Instead, it featured Pimp C's friend Mitchell Queen. Bun B and friend Jalon Jackson had their own group called P.A. Militia. Both groups joined forces and formed the group 4 Black Ministers. Queen and Jackson later left the group leaving Pimp C and Bun B so they decided to revert to UGK. The demo Pimp C recorded with Mitchell Queen, Underground King, caught the attention of an independent label in Houston called Bigtyme Records. They then released an extended play titled The Southern Way. The release of this record caught the attention of Jive Records. While recording their debut album, Too Hard to Swallow, many of the songs had content too explicit for the album, so Bigtyme Records released an extended play titled Banned before the album was released, including all the songs that were too explicit for Too Hard to Swallow. The song "Pocket Full of Stones" became the first UGK song to get major airplay throughout the United States. Their second album, Super Tight..., followed in 1994. Their third album, Ridin' Dirty, peaked at number 2 on the R&B Charts in 1996, and at number 15 on the Billboard 200. After releasing their fourth studio album, Dirty Money, Pimp C got sentenced to jail.

=== Trill and beginning of solo career ===
When Bun B's UGK partner, the late Chad "Pimp C" Butler, entered a jail sentence on an aggravated gun assault charge in 2002, Bun B made guest appearances on numerous albums by other rappers and released a 2005 mixtape titled Legends. Singles featuring a Bun B guest appearance included "They Don't Know" by Paul Wall, "Gimme That" by Webbie and "I'm A G" by Yung Joc. Bun B also appeared in a documentary titled Screwed In Houston produced by VBS/Vice that details the history of the Houston rap scene.

In October 2005, Bun B's debut solo album Trill was released. Singles included "Draped Up", "Git It", and "Get Throwed". The album peaked at the number 6 spot on the American Billboard 200 chart and number 1 on the Top R&B/Hip Hop Albums chart.

=== II Trill ===
After Pimp C died in 2007, Bun B returned to a solo career. In 2008, he released his second album, II Trill. The first single was "That's Gangsta" featuring Jamaican American artist Sean Kingston. It debuted at number 2 on the Billboard 200, selling 98,000 copies. Other singles were "Damn I'm Cold" featuring Lil Wayne and "You're Everything" featuring Rick Ross, David Banner, DJ Corbett and 8Ball & MJG, the latter of which was dedicated to the late Pimp C.

=== Trill OG ===
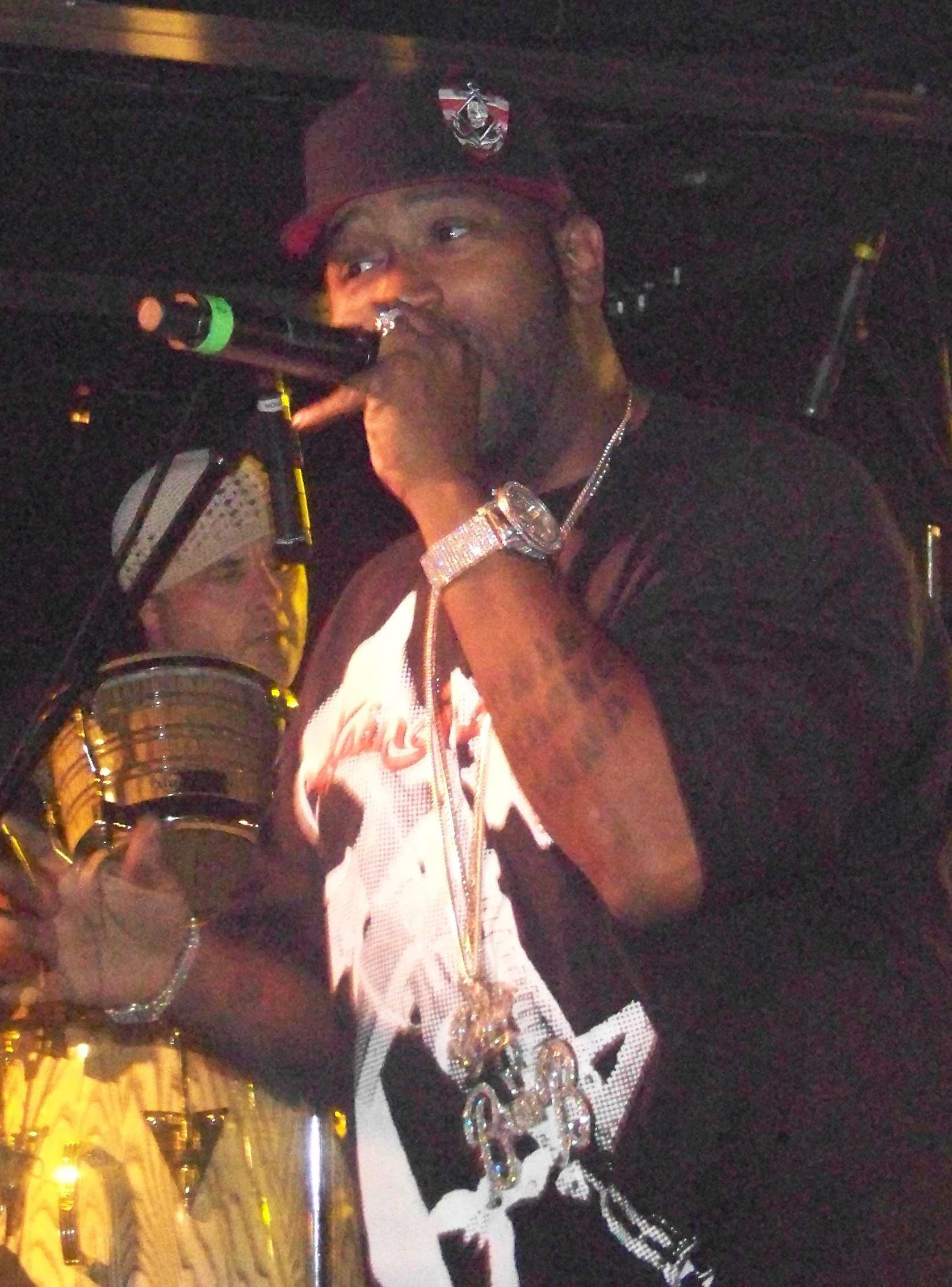
Bun B performing in 2008

Bun B's third album is Trill OG. In an interview with MTV Live, Bun B stated that 2Pac was set to feature on the album, claiming "It's a brand new verse." The album was released under Universal Music Group on August 3, 2010.

=== Trill OG: The Epilogue ===
On October 28, 2011, a song titled "The Life" and produced by 14KT was leaked. On March 3, 2012, Bun B leaked a song featuring Royce da 5'9" and Redman titled "Stop Playin'" after he reached 400,000 followers on Twitter. He has not announced the song's appearance on his upcoming album

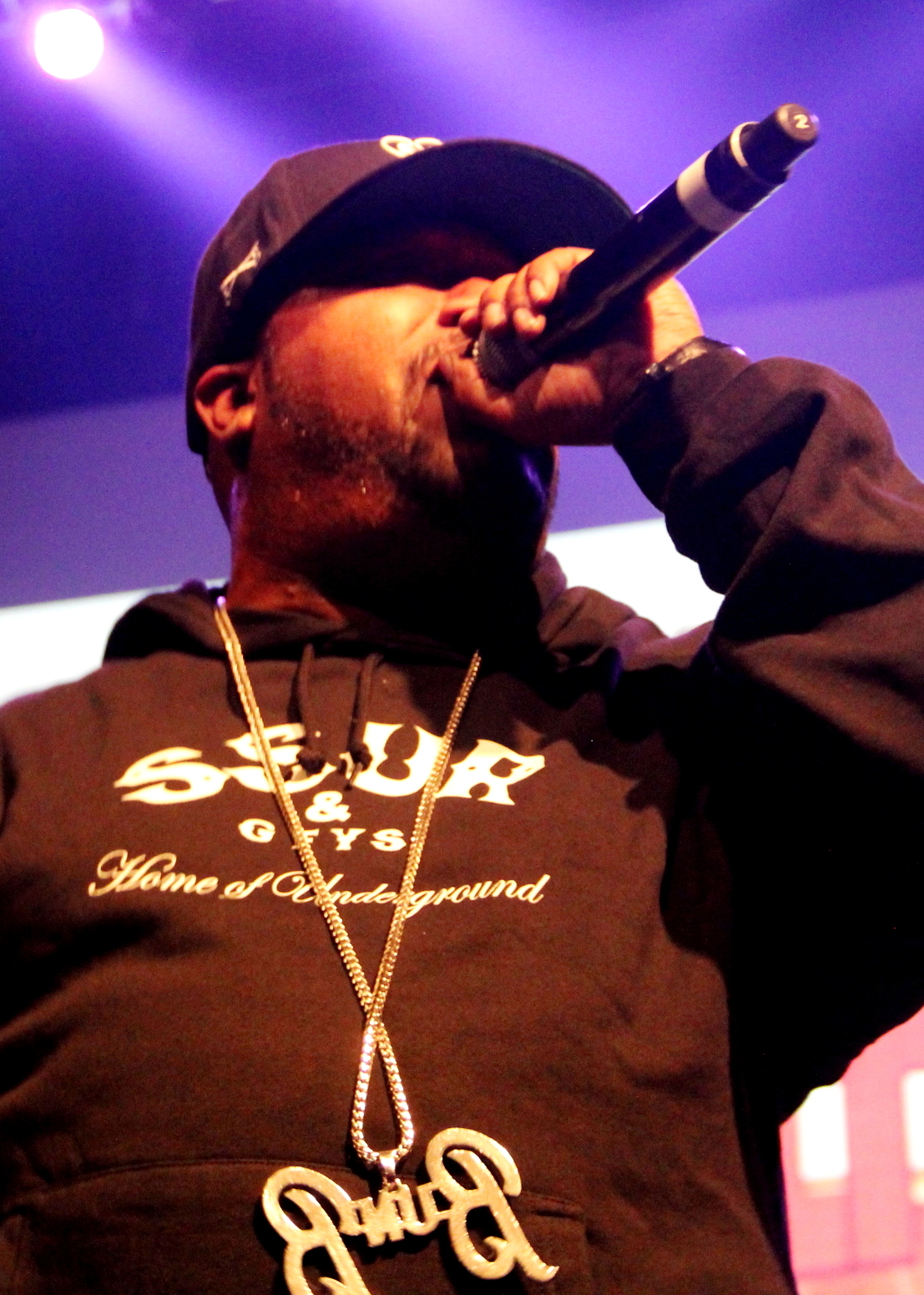
Bun B performing in 2013

His fourth studio album was rumored to be titled, Trill 4 Life and scheduled for a 2013 release. On August 22, 2013, Rap-A-Lot Records revealed that his Sony distributed fourth studio album will be released in October 2013. The album is to feature guest appearances from Rick Ross and 2 Chainz. On October 4, 2013, the album was then officially announced to be titled Trill OG: The Epilogue and be released on November 12, 2013. The album was revealed to contain primarily leftover tracks from the Trill O.G. recording sessions. It was also confirmed to feature Pimp C, 2 Chainz, Rick Ross, Lil Boosie, Kirko Bangz, Big K.R.I.T., Raekwon, Z-Ro and Devin The Dude.

Bun B announced "The Trillest Tour" in January 2014. On January 30, the Houston native revealed the tour dates, where he was accompanied by fellow Houston native Kirko Bangz. The tour ran from March 6 until April 17, 2014.

In 2025, Freeman provided skits on JackBoys and Travis Scott's second compilation album JackBoys 2.

== Other ventures ==
=== Awards ===
On June 24, 2014, Bun B made a guest appearance to the Htown Beatdown concert hosted by local radio station Hot 95.7. He was awarded the 360 Legend Award for his successful music career and his impact on the local community.

=== Teaching ===
At the start of the Spring 2011 semester, Bun B joined the faculty of Rice University as a Distinguished Lecturer. He taught a course in the School of the Humanities on Hip hop and Religion. Into 2013 Bun B continues to teach the course twice a week.

=== Coloring book ===
On September 17, 2013, Freeman released a coloring book titled "Bun B's Rap Coloring Book" along with author Shea Serrano. Freeman and Serrano had previously talked about working together to make a book. At first they agreed on a "hip hop survival guide", but both agreed against the project. Later on, Serrano drew coloring pages of rappers that he posted on Tumblr. The pages quickly went viral. Freeman and Serrano then decided to make a whole coloring book.

=== Trill Burgers ===
Bun B opened up Trill Burgers located on South Shepherd and Richmond Avenue in Houston, Texas.

== Personal life ==
Bun B has been married to Angela "Queenie" Wells since 2003 and has two stepchildren and seven step-grandchildren. His stepson is American rapper Young-B, who is a member of the rap group Youngest N Charge, which is Bun B's opening act.

Since 2013, he has been a guest lecturer at Houston's Rice University.

On April 24, 2019, Bun B shot an armed intruder who was attempting to rob his Houston home. The intruder fled on foot. The suspect, DeMonte Jackson, was taken into custody by Houston police after arriving at the hospital.

== Discography ==
Studio albums

- Trill (2005)
- II Trill (2008)
- Trill OG (2010)
- Trill OG: The Epilogue (2013)
- Return of the Trill (2018)

Collaborative albums

- TrillStatik (with Statik Selektah) (2019)
- Mo Trill (with Cory Mo) (2022)
- TrillStatik 2 (with Statik Selektah) (2022)
- TrillStatik 3 (with Statik Selektah) (2023)
- TrillStatik 4 (with Statik Selektah) (2024)
- Way Mo Trill (with Cory Mo) (2025)
- TrillStatik 5 (with Statik Selektah) (2025)

== Filmography ==
- Survival of the Illest (2004)
- Dominos: The Games We Play (2006)
- Ghetto Stories (2010)
- Video Girl (2011)
- Something from Nothing: The Art of Rap (2012)
- Candy (2017)
- Mo (2022)
- Lotus Land (2023)
