= Boosie Badazz discography =

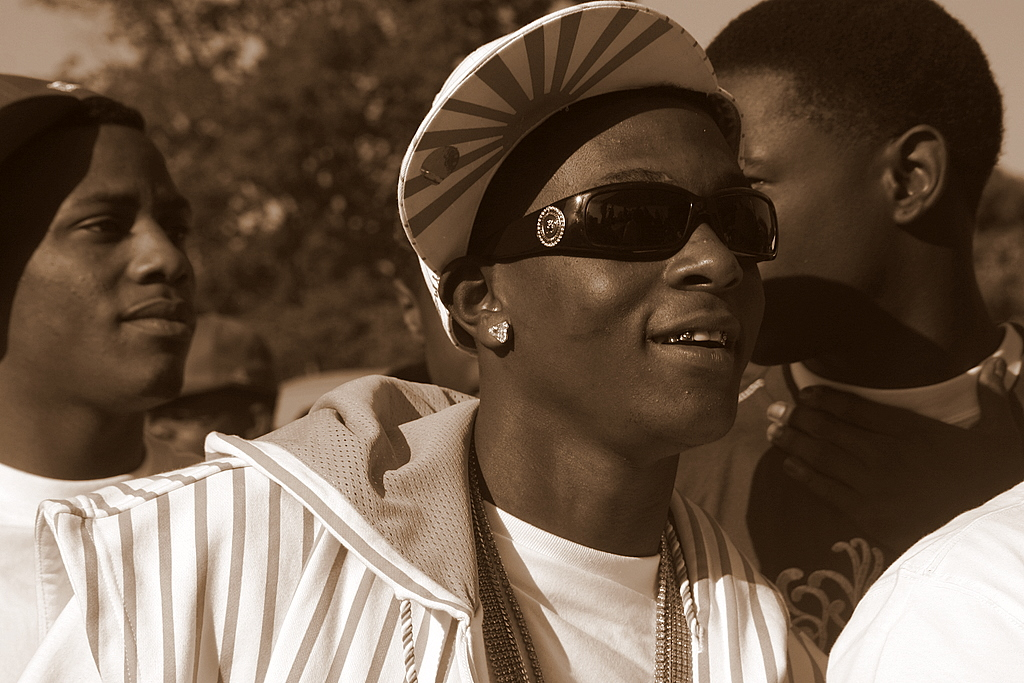
- Boosie Badazz in 2007
- Studio albums: 13
- EPs: 1
- Singles: 26
- Mixtapes: 44
- Featured singles: 15
- Guest appearances: 78

American rapper Boosie Badazz has released 13 studio albums, seven collaboration albums, 44 mixtapes, three compilation albums, one extended play, 26 singles (including 15 singles as a featured artist), and 33 music videos.

== Albums ==
=== Studio albums ===
List of albums, with selected chart positions
Title	Album details	Peak chart positions		
Title	Album details	US	US R&B	US Rap
Youngest of da Camp	Released: August 19, 2000; Label: Camplife; Format: CD, digital download	—	96	—
For My Thugz	Released: January 1, 2002; Label: Trill; Format: CD, digital download	—	—	—
Bad Azz	Released: October 24, 2006; Label: Trill, Asylum, Warner Bros.; Format: CD, digital download	3	2	1
Superbad: The Return of Boosie Bad Azz	Released: September 15, 2009; Label: Trill, Asylum, Warner Bros.; Format: CD, digital download	7	4	3
Incarcerated	Released: September 28, 2010; Label: Trill, Asylum, Warner Bros.; Format: CD, digital download	13	6	4
Touch Down 2 Cause Hell	Released: May 26, 2015; Label: Trill, Bad Azz, Atlantic; Format: CD, digital download	3	2	2
BooPac	Released: December 15, 2017; Label: Trill, Bad Azz, Atlantic; Format: CD, digital download	38	16	12
Badazz 3.5	Released: March 28, 2019; Label: Trill, Bad Azz, Atlantic; Format: CD, digital download	—	—	—
Goat Talk	Released: December 20, 2019; Label: Trill, Bad Azz, Atlantic; Format: CD, digital download	—	—	—
In House	Released: June 12, 2020; Label: Bad Azz; Format: Digital download	—	—	—
Goat Talk 3	Released: July 16, 2021; Label: Bad Azz, Connect Music; Format: Digital download	—	—	—
Heartfelt	Released: February 22, 2022; Label: Bad Azz, Connect Music; Format: Digital download	—	—	—
Lines for Valentines	Released: February 13, 2023; Label: Bad Azz; Format: Digital download	—	—	—
"—" denotes a recording that did not chart or was not released in that territory.

=== Collaboration albums ===
List of albums, with selected chart positions
Title	Album details	Peak chart positions		
Title	Album details	US	US R&B	US Rap
Ghetto Stories (with Webbie)	Released: July 22, 2003; Label: Trill; Format: CD, cassette, digital download	—	56	—
Gangsta Musik (with Webbie)	Released: May 25, 2004; Label: Warner Bros.; Format: CD, digital download	—	35	14
Trill Entertainment Presents: Survival of the Fittest (with Trill Entertainment)	Released: May 15, 2007; Label: Trill; Format: CD, digital download	17	3	2
Trill Entertainment Presents: All or Nothing (with Trill Entertainment)	Released: November 9, 2010; Label: Trill; Format: CD, digital download	49	8	5
Penitentiary Chances (with C-Murder)	Released: April 14, 2016; Label: TRU / RBC; Format: CD, digital download	172	15	9
Trill Entertainment Presents: Trill Fam - Respect Is a Must (with Trill Entertainment)	Released: June 24, 2016; Label: Trill, Atlantic; Format: CD, digital download	—	—	—
Badazz MO3 (with MO3)	Released: February 14, 2020; Label: Badazz, H$M, Empire; Format: Digital download, streaming	136	—	—
"—" denotes a recording that did not chart.

=== Mixtapes ===
Boosie Badazz's mixtapes and details
Title	Mixtape details
Boosie 2002 (Advance)	Released: 2002
Trill Azz Mixes Vol. 1 (with Webbie)	Released: 2004
Both Sides of the Track (with S.C.C.)	Released: August 13, 2004
Trill Azz Mixes Vol. 2 (with Lil Phat)	Released: December 14, 2004
Bad Azz (Advance)	Released: 2005
United We Stand, Divided We Fall (with Lava House)	Released: January 1, 2005
Street Code (with Pat Lowrenzo)	Released: January 1, 2005
The Bad Azz Mixtape	Released: September 13, 2006; Hosted by Kool DJ Supamike
Streetz Iz Mine	Released: December 4, 2006; Hosted by DJ Drama
Street Tapes Vol. 1 (with Lava House)	Released: 2007
Bad Azz Mixtape, Vol. 2	Released: March 6, 2007
Da Beginning	Released: 2008
Untitled Mixtape (4th of July)	Released: July 10, 2008
The Return of Mr. Wipe Me Down	Released: March 28, 2008
Category 7: Bad Azz Hurricane (with Hurricane Chris)	Released: July 8, 2009
Street Kingz: The Mixtape Vol. 1 (with Bad Azz Entertainment)	Released: July 14, 2009
Thug Passion	Released: October 28, 2009
The 25th Hour	Released: November 10, 2009
Should've Been My Beatz	Released: December 11, 2009
Lil Boosie Presents: Da Click (Street Kingz Mixtape Vol. 2) (with Da Click)	Released: December 16, 2009
The Untouchables (with LoLa Monroe)	Released: December 31, 2009; Hosted by DJ Fletch
Gone Til December	Released: April 17, 2010
Hit After Hit (with Quick)	Released: April 29, 2010
22504 (with B.G.)	Released: June 6, 2010
Hit After Hit Vol. 2 (with Quick)	Released: September 22, 2010
Hit After Hit Vol. 3 (with Quick)	Released: April 17, 2011
My Brothers Keeper (with Money Bagz and Quick)	Released: May 5, 2011; Hosted by DJ Rell
Under Investigation (with Ray Vicks)	Released: November 27, 2011; Hosted by DJ 5150
Life After Deathrow	Released: October 30, 2014; Chart Positions: US 88, US R&B/Hip-Hop 12
Every Ghetto, Every City Vol. 1 (with Bad Azz Music Syndicate)	Released: March 27, 2015; Hosted by Trill Ent
Thrilla, Vol. 1	Released: October 30, 2015; Hosted by Trill Ent; Chart Positions: US R&B/Hip-Hop 20
In My Feelings. (Goin' Thru It)	Released: January 1, 2016; Chart Positions: US 105, US R&B/Hip-Hop 11
Out My Feelings in My Past	Released: February 5, 2016; Chart Positions: US 57, US R&B/Hip-Hop 10
Thug Talk	Released: March 16, 2016; Chart Positions: US 130, US R&B/Hip-Hop 14
Bleek Mode (Thug in Peace Lil Bleek)	Released: May 11, 2016
Happy Thanksgiving & Merry Christmas	Released: November 23, 2016
Boonk Gang	Released: April 27, 2018
Boosie Blues Cafe	Released: November 22, 2018
Savage Holidays	Released: December 27, 2018
Bad Azz Zay (with Zaytoven)	Released: September 19, 2019
Talk Dat Shit	Released: November 14, 2019
Goat Talk 2: Corona Edition	Released: April 9, 2020
Back 2 BR	Released: November 26, 2021
Mississippi	Released: November 26, 2021
225 Business (featuring YoungBoy Never Broke Again)	Released: November 14, 2025

=== Compilation albums ===
Year	Title
2008	The Leak: Released: April 15, 2008; Label: Get It How You Live; Formats: Digital download, LP
2010	Unbreakable: Released: July 6, 2010; Label: Camp Life Ent.; Formats: Digital download, LP
2013	The Last Dayz B4 the Good Dayz: Released: March 12, 2013; Label: Landmark Ltd; Formats: Digital download, LP

== Extended plays ==
List of EPs, with selected chart positions
Title	Details
Three Peat	Release date: September 8, 2015; Label: Bad Azz Entertainment; Format: Digital download

== Singles ==
=== As lead artist ===
List of singles as lead artist, with selected chart positions, showing year released and album name
Title	Year	Peak chart positions			Certifications	Album
Title	Year	US	US R&B	US Rap	Certifications	Album
"Zoom" (featuring Yung Joc)	2006	61	25	14	RIAA: Platinum	Bad Azz
"Wipe Me Down" (featuring Foxx and Webbie)	2007	38	8	4	RIAA: 5x Platinum	Trill Entertainment Presents: Survival of the Fittest
"Better Believe It" (featuring Webbie and Young Jeezy)	2009	—	40	23	RIAA: Platinum	Superbad: The Return of Boosie Bad Azz
"Better Not Fight" (featuring Lil Trill, Webbie and Foxx)	2010	—	— (Note: "Better Not Fight" did not enter the Hot R&B/Hip-Hop Songs chart, but peaked at number 23 on the Bubbling Under R&B/Hip-Hop Singles chart.)	—		Incarcerated
"Turn the Beat Up" (with Mouse, Lil Trill, Foxx, Lil Phat and Webbie)	2010	—	—	—		Trill Entertainment Presents: All or Nothing
"Show Da World" (with Webbie, featuring Kiara)	2014	— (Note: "Show Da World" did not enter the Billboard Hot 100, but peaked at number two on the Bubbling Under Hot 100 Singles chart.)	28	17		Non-album singles
"Heart of a Lion"	2014	—	—	—		Non-album singles
"Show 'Em" (featuring Webbie, Wankaego and K Camp)	2014	—	—	—		Non-album singles
"Like a Man" (featuring Rich Homie Quan)	2014	—	—	—		Touchdown 2 Cause Hell
"On That Level" (featuring Webbie)	2014	—	—	—		Touchdown 2 Cause Hell
"Retaliation"	2015	—	—	—		Touchdown 2 Cause Hell
"Nasty, Nasty" (featuring Mulatto)	2019	—	—	—	RIAA: Platinum	Talk Dat Shit
"Period" (featuring DaBaby)	2021	—	—	—	RIAA: Gold	Goat Talk 3
"—" denotes a recording that did not chart or was not released in that territory.

=== As featured artist ===
List of singles as featured artist, with selected chart positions and certifications, showing year released and album name
Title	Year	Peak chart positions				Certifications	Album
Title	Year	US	US R&B	US Rap	CAN	Certifications	Album
"Ride" (Bluez Brothaz featuring Boosie Badazz)	2004	—	86	—	—		Slaughterville. Population: 4
"Ain't Got Nothing" (David Banner featuring Magic and Boosie Badazz)	2005	—	93	—	—		Certified
"Beautiful Girls" (Remix) (Sean Kingston featuring Fabolous and Boosie Badazz)	2007	—	—	—	—		Non-album single
"A Bay Bay" (The Ratchet Remix) (Hurricane Chris featuring The Game, Boosie Badazz, E-40, Baby, Angie Locc and Jadakiss)	2007	—	—	—	—		51/50 Ratchet
"The Way I Live" (Baby Boy da Prince featuring Boosie Badazz and D. Weezy)	2007	21	85	11	—		Across the Water
"Independent" (Webbie featuring Lil Phat and Lil Boosie)	2007	9	5	1	—		Savage Life 2
"Out Here Grindin" (DJ Khaled featuring Akon, Rick Ross, Young Jeezy, Lil Boosie, Trick Daddy, Ace Hood and Plies)	2008	38	32	17	71	RIAA: Gold; MC: Gold	We Global
"Uh Oh" (Derty featuring Lil Boosie)	2009	—	95	—	—		Non-album singles
"Haterz" (Keith Frank featuring Lil Boosie)	2013	—	—	—	—		Non-album singles
"Rich Off Lean" (Boston George featuring Future and Lil Boosie)	2014	—	—	—	—		Non-album singles
"Nickel Rock" (Rick Ross featuring Boosie Badazz)	2014	—	—	—	—		Hood Billionaire
"FYM" (Meek Mill featuring Boosie Badazz)	2014	— (Note: "FYM" did not enter the Billboard Hot 100, but peaked at number 19 on the Bubbling Under Hot 100 Singles chart.)	32	—	—		Non-album single
"Pleazer" (Tyga featuring Boosie Badazz)	2015	—	—	—	—		The Gold Album: 18th Dynasty
"Tricken Every Car I Get" (Trae tha Truth featuring Future and Boosie Badazz)	2015	—	—	—	—		Tha Truth
"Going Viral" (Kodak Black featuring Boosie Badazz)	2016	—	—	—	—		Non-album single
"That's on Me" (Remix) (Yella Beezy featuring 2 Chainz, T.I., Rich The Kid, Jeezy, Boosie Badazz and Trapboy Freddy)	2018	56	—	—	—	RIAA: Gold	Ain't No Going Bacc
"Tha Paper" (Dandrell Scott featuring Boosie Badazz)	2021	—	—	—	—		King of Everything, Vol. 1
"—" denotes a recording that did not chart or was not released in that territory.

== Other charted songs ==
List of songs, with selected chart positions, showing year released and album name
Title	Year	Peak chart positions	Album
Title	Year	US R&B	Album
"Show Ya Tattoos" (with Webbie, featuring UGK)	2004	— (Note: "Show Ya Tattoos" did not enter the Hot R&B/Hip-Hop Songs chart, but peaked at number ten on the Bubbling Under R&B/Hip-Hop Singles chart.)	Gangsta Musik
"Do tha Ratchet" (Ratchet King featuring Lil Boosie and Untame Mayne)	2006	— (Note: "Do tha Ratchet" did not enter the Hot R&B/Hip-Hop Songs chart, but peaked at number 24 on the Bubbling Under R&B/Hip-Hop Singles chart.)	United We Stand, Divided We Fall
"Everything" (Young Jeezy featuring Anthony Hamilton and Lil Boosie)	2008	— (Note: "Everything" did not enter the Hot R&B/Hip-Hop Songs chart, but peaked at number three on the Bubbling Under R&B/Hip-Hop Singles chart.)	The Recession
"Loose as a Goose" (featuring Foxx and Mouse)	2009	— (Note: "Loose as a Goose" did not enter the Hot R&B/Hip-Hop Songs chart, but peaked at number 12 on the Bubbling Under R&B/Hip-Hop Singles chart.)	Superbad: The Return of Boosie Bad Azz
"—" denotes a recording that did not chart or was not released in that territory.

== Guest appearances ==
List of non-single guest appearances, with other performing artists, showing year released and album name
Title	Year	Other artist(s)	Album
"Throw It Up"	2002	C-Loc	Thuggin' from the Inside
"In & Out"	2002	Lil Witness, Max Minelli, T-Bo, SCC	Real Life's Not Fake
"Nice Action"	2003	C-Loc	It's a Gamble
"Pussy Ass Niggaz"	2003	C-Loc	It's a Gamble
"That's My Thug There"	2003	C-Loc	It's a Gamble
"Take a Picture"	2004	C-Loc	Block Burner
"Full of That Shit"	2005	Webbie	Savage Life
"I Got That"	2005	Webbie	Savage Life
"Back Up"	2005	Webbie	Savage Life
"U Don't Want That"	2005	Webbie, Big Head	Savage Life
"We from the South"	2006	Angie Locc, Big Poppa	United We Stand, Divided We Fall
"S.O.U.T.H.S.I.D.E."	2006	Big Poppa, T-Fat	United We Stand, Divided We Fall
"Bow Ya Head (Real Shit)"	2006	Hood Dwelluz	United We Stand, Divided We Fall
"We Bout That Gangsta Shit"	2006	Big Poppa, T-Fat	United We Stand, Divided We Fall
"Get Money"	2006	Big Poppa, T-Fat	United We Stand, Divided We Fall
"Do tha Ratchet"	2006	Ratchet King, Untame Mayne	United We Stand, Divided We Fall
"Fuck Da Laws"	2008	Lil Phat	Life of a Yungsta
"In My Neighborhood"	2008	Lil Phat	Life of a Yungsta
"Thuggin"	2008	Nipsey Hussle, Lil Cali	Bullets Ain't Got No Name Vol. 2
"Damn Right I'm Bout Mine"	2008	Young Buck, 615, D-Tay	Buck the Law
"Everything"	2008	Young Jeezy, Anthony Hamilton	The Recession
"Thuggin'"	2008	Webbie, Lil Phat, Shell	Savage Life 2
"Get In The Way"	2008	Kevin Gates	All or Nuthing
"Fire"	2009	Twista	Category F5
"Nigga Owe Me Some Money"	2009	B.G., C-Murder, Soulja Slim, Young Buck	Too Hood 2 Be Hollywood
"Cadilac"	2009	Tony Yayo	The Swine Flu
"Sho No Love"	2009	Tony Yayo	The Swine Flu
"Bring the Money Out"	2010	DJ Khaled, Nelly, Ace Hood	Victory
"Hustle Game"	2010	DJ Kay Slay, Bun B, Webbie, Nicole Wray	More Than Just a DJ
"187"	2011	Game	Purp & Patron
"Far Off"	2011	Lil Trill, Lil Phat	Rags 2 Riches
"Done It All"	2011	Mistah F.A.B., Yo Gotti, Tajma	The Grind Is a Terrible Thing to Waste Part 2
"They Don't Like Me"	2012	Lil Trill, Shell, Yo Gotti	By Any Means Necessary
"Turn Up or Die"	2013	Young Jeezy	It's Tha World
"Cake"	2013	Bun B, Big K.R.I.T., Pimp C	Trill OG: The Epilogue
"Lay It Down"	2013	Rick Ross, Young Breed	Self Made Vol. 3
"Poppin' Tags" (Remix)	2014	Future, Laudie	—N/a
"Wuda Cuda Shuda"	2014	2 Chainz	Freebase
"Up Down (Do This All Day)" (Remix)	2014	T-Pain, B.o.B, Kid Ink	—N/a
"Cut Her Off" (Remix)	2014	K Camp, YG, Too $hort	—N/a
"Beat Up the Block"	2014	Dorrough Music	Texafornia
"Face Down"	2014	DJ Mustard, Lil Wayne, Big Sean, YG	10 Summers
"Beez Like"	2014	Young Jeezy	Seen It All: The Autobiography
"Jet Fuel"	2014	T.I.	Paperwork
"Made Me" (Remix)	2014	Snootie Wild, Jeremih	—N/a
"Meant 2 Be"	2014	Lil Snupe	R.N.I.C. 2 Jonesboro
"Better Than Them"	2014	S.B.O.E., Rich Homie Quan, Yo Gotti	Screens on Lock: 4th Quarter Press
"Hard 2 Be Black"	2014	C-Murder, Snoop Dogg	—N/a
"Money Sack"	2014	E-40	Sharp On All 4 Corners - Corner 1
"Nickel Rock"	2014	Rick Ross	Hood Billionaire
"I Smell Pussy"	2014	Calico Jonez, Tracy T, Kash Taz	—N/a
"I Feel Like"	2014	Yo Gotti	Concealed
"Pots & Stoves"	2014	Young Scooter, Quick	Jug Season
"Fuck You Mean"	2014	Meek Mill	Dreams Worth More Than Money
"Exotic"	2014	Shawty Lo, Rick Ross	King of Bankhead
"Trickin"	2014	Trae tha Truth, Future	—N/a
"Indictments"	2014	B Will	—N/a
"Pockets Swoll"	2014	Cristol	Worldwide
"She Twerkin" (Remix)	2014	Cash Out, Juicy J, Ty Dolla Sign, Kid Ink	Let's Get It
"Ratchet" (Remix)	2014	Hurricane Chris	—N/a
"Big Thangs"	2014	Plies	Purple Heart
"Show Em"	2014	Wankaego, Webbie, K Camp	—N/a
"Aint Hard to Find"	2014	XVII	Hoggin
"Pray For Me Mama"	2014	Bambino Gold	—N/a
"I Miss My Nigga"	2014	Donkey	Loyalty Means Everything
"Came 2 Da Can"	2014	C-Murder	—N/a
"Real One"	2015	Chris Brown, Tyga	Fan of a Fan: The Album
"You a Thot" (Remix)	2015	K.E. on the Track, Young Lace	—N/a
"Pull Up"	2015	Young Buck, Cap 1	Before The Beast
"1500"	2015	Rich Homie Quan, Peewee Longway	—N/a
"My Niggas"	2015	K Camp	One Way
"Choppas"	2015	Tracy T	—N/a
"For My Homies Dead & Gone"	2015	C-Murder, Lil Kano	—N/a
"Can't Tell"	2015	Young Thug, T.I.	Barter 6
"Nigga"	2015	50 Cent, Young Buck	The Kanan Tape
"Flicka da Wrist (Remix)"	2015	Chedda da Connect, Fetty Wap, Yo Gotti, Boston George	—N/a
"Corner Boy"	2016	Hypnotiq, Fiend, Mike Jones	—N/a
"You Know I Ain't Scared"	2016	Whop Bezzy	—N/a
"Up In Blood"	2016	YoungBoy Never Broke Again	38 Baby
"B.I.G."	2017	Shawty Lo, Alexis Branch	R.I.C.O.
"Amber Alert"	2017	Young Buck	10 Toes Down
"Switch It Up"	2018	Young Buck	10 Plugs
"3 Options"	2018	Quando Rondo	Life After Fame
"Free Trell (Remix)"	2018	YNW Melly	—N/a
"RIP to the Parking Lot"	2019	T-Pain	1UP
"Gangsta Cryin"	2020	NoCap	Steel Human
"Frio"	2021	Mr. Criminal, RG	Soldier To A Boss
"2 Aces"	2021	Young Buck	B.O.M.B.S Vol. 3

== Music videos ==
=== As lead artist ===
List of music videos as lead artist, with directors, showing year released
Title	Year	Director
"Zoom" (featuring Yung Joc)	2006	Thomas Forbes
"Wipe Me Down" (featuring Foxx and Webbie)	2007	The Dream Team
"Fresh Cut"	2008	—N/a
"Back in the Day"	2009	—N/a
"Better Believe It" (featuring Webbie and Young Jeezy)	2009	Edwin Decena
"Gin in My Cup"	2009	—N/a
"Loose as a Goose"	2009	—N/a
"I'm a Dog"	2009	Mr. Boomtown
"Top Notch" (with Lil Phat, Lil Trill & Mouse)	2009	Mr. Boomtown
"Fire" (with Twista)	2010	Travis Long
"Mind of a Maniac"	2010	Motion Family
"My Brother's Keeper"	2010	—N/a
"The Rain"	2010	Phil the God
"Better Not Fight" (featuring Foxx, Webbie, Lil Trill, & Mouse)	2010	Phil the God
"Top to the Bottom"	2010	—N/a
"Green Light Special" (with LoLa Monroe)	2011	—N/a
"Touchdown"	2011	—N/a
"Mama Know Love"	2012	—N/a
"Show Da World" (with Webbie, featuring Kiara)	2014	G. Visuals
"Letter 2 Pac"	2015	The Music Staff Films
"Wanna B Heard" (featuring Slim Thug)	2016	Studio713 & Badazz Films
"The Truth"	2016	Javier Hearne
"World War 6"	2016	—N/a
"Forgive Me Being Lost"	2016	Sean Allen
"A Problem" (with Webbie)	2016	—N/a
"Problem"	2016	—N/a
"The Rain"	2016	—N/a
"Cancer"	2016	Boosie Badazz & Sedrick Savoy
"Smile To Keep From Crying"	2016	Boosie Badazz & Sedrick Savoy

=== As featured artist ===
List of music videos as featured artist, with directors, showing year released
Title	Year	Director
"Ain't Got Nothing" (David Banner featuring Magic and Lil Boosie)	2005	Gregory Dark, David Banner
"The Way I Live" (Baby Boy da Prince featuring Lil Boosie and D. Weezy)	2007	Mr. Boomtown
"Independent" (Webbie featuring Lil Boosie and Lil Phat)	2008	Chris Comeaux
"Out Here Grindin'" (DJ Khaled featuring Akon, Rick Ross, Young Jeezy, Lil Boosie, Trick Daddy, Ace Hood and Plies)	2008	Gil Green, pLot
"Cut Her Off (Remix)" (K Camp featuring Lil Boosie, Too Short and YG)	2014	—N/a
