= Webbie discography =

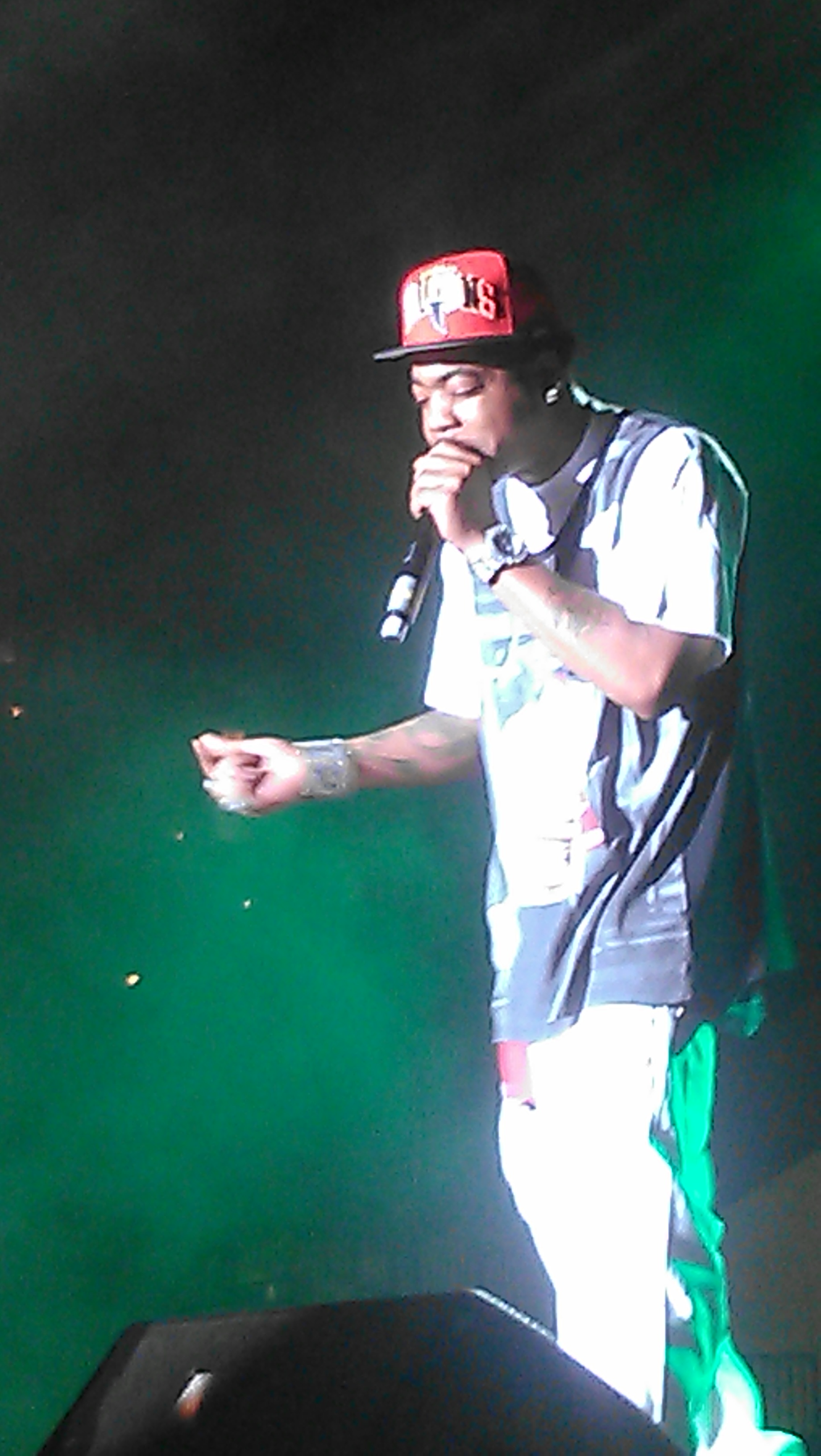
- Webbie performing in 2014
- Studio albums: 5
- Singles: 11
- Mixtapes: 6

This is the discography of American rapper Webbie.

== Albums ==
=== Studio albums ===
List of albums, with selected chart positions
Title	Album details	Peak chart positions		
Title	Album details	US	US R&B	US Rap
Savage Life	Released: June 21, 2005; Label: Trill, Asylum; Format: CD, digital download	2	4	4
Savage Life 2	Released: February 26, 2008; Label: Trill, Asylum, Atlantic; Format: CD, digital download	1	1	1
Savage Life 3	Released: November 15, 2011; Label: Trill, RBC; Format: CD, digital download	17	3	3
Savage Life 4	Released: November 19, 2013; Label: Trill; Format: CD, digital download	27	7	4
Savage Life V	Released: May 20, 2016; Label: Trill,Atlantic; Format: CD, digital download	153	8	5
Savage Life 6	Released: October 16, 2020; Label: Webbie Music; Format: CD, digital download	–	–	–

=== Collaboration albums ===
List of albums, with selected chart positions
Title	Album details	Peak chart positions		
Title	Album details	US	US R&B	US Rap
Ghetto Stories (with Lil Boosie)	Released: July 22, 2003; Label: Trill; Format: CD, cassette, digital download	—	56	—
Gangsta Musik (with Lil Boosie)	Released: May 25, 2004; Label: Warner Bros.; Format: CD, digital download	—	35	14
Trill Entertainment Presents: Survival of the Fittest (with Trill Entertainment)	Released: May 15, 2007; Label: Trill; Format: CD, digital download	17	3	2
Trill Entertainment Presents: All or Nothing (with Trill Entertainment)	Released: November 9, 2010; Label: Trill; Format: CD, digital download	49	8	5
Trill Entertainment Presents: Trill Fam - Respect Is a Must (with Trill Entertainment)	Released: June 24, 2016; Label: Trill, Atlantic; Format: CD, digital download	—	—	—
"—" denotes a recording that did not chart.

=== Mixtapes ===
Webbie's mixtapes and details
Title	Mixtape details
Gangsta Grillz #14	Released: September 26, 2006; Hosted by DJ Drama and DJ Jaycee
New King of BR	Released: December 22, 2010; Hosted by DJ Rell
Trill 4 Life (with Lil Phat of 3 Deep)	Released: November 21, 2010; Hosted by DJ Chill
Savage Stories	Released: July 19, 2011; Hosted by DJ E-Dub and DJ Killa
Sweet Jones, Jr.	Released: November 20, 2012; Hosted by DJ Killa
Money Good	Released: November 27, 2014; Hosted by Trill Ent

== Singles ==
=== As lead artist ===
List of singles, with selected chart positions, showing year released and album name
Title	Year	Peak chart positions			Album
Title	Year	US	US R&B	US Rap	Album
"Give Me That" (featuring Bun B)	2005	29	8	4	Savage Life
"Bad Bitch"^{[A]} (featuring Trina)	2005	120	48	—	Savage Life
"How U Ridin'"	2005	—	91	—	Savage Life
"Independent" (featuring Lil Phat and Lil Boosie)	2007	9	5	1	Savage Life 2
"I Miss You" (featuring LeToya Luckett)	2008	—	64	—	Savage Life 2
"My People"^{[B]}	2010	—	115	—	Trill Entertainment Presents: All or Nothing
"Turn the Beat Up" (with Mouse, Lil Phat, Lil Trill, Foxx and Lil Boosie)	2010	—	—	—	Trill Entertainment Presents: All or Nothing
"What's Happenin'" (featuring Lil Phat)	2011	—	95	—	Savage Life 3
"What I Do'"	2013	—	—	—	Savage Life 4
"Show Da World" (Lil Boosie & Webbie featuring Kiara)	2014	102	28	17	non-album single
"—" denotes a recording that did not chart.

=== As featured artist ===
List of singles, with selected chart positions, showing year released and album name
Title	Year	Peak chart positions			Album
Title	Year	US	US R&B	US Rap	Album
"Wipe Me Down" (Lil Boosie featuring Foxx and Webbie)	2007	38	8	4	Trill Entertainment Presents: Survival of the Fittest
"Bizzy Body" (Paul Wall featuring Webbie and Mouse)	2008	—	49	23	Fast Life
"Better Believe It" (Lil Boosie featuring Webbie and Young Jeezy)	2009	—	40	23	Superbad: The Return of Boosie Bad Azz
"Lil Freak (Ugh, Ugh, Ugh)" (Three 6 Mafia featuring Webbie)	2009	—	86	—	Laws of Power
"—" denotes a recording that did not chart.

== Other charted songs ==
List of singles, with selected chart positions, showing year released and album name
Title	Year	Peak chart positions	Album
Title	Year	US R&B	Album
"What Is It"^{[C]}	2005	109	Savage Life
"Like That"	2005	68	Savage Life
"Pop It 4 Pimp"^{[D]} (Bun B featuring Juvenile and Webbie)	2008	115	II Trill
"I Don't Love Her"^{[E]} (Gucci Mane featuring Rocko and Webbie)	2011	102	The Return of Mr. Zone 6

== Music videos ==
List of music videos, with directors, showing year released
Title	Year	Director(s)
"Give Me That"	2005	Christian Strickland
"Bad Bitch"	2005	Mr. Teeth
"Independent"	2007	Chris Cormeaux

== Notes ==
- A "Bad Bitch" did not enter the Billboard Hot 100, but peaked at number 20 on the Bubbling Under Hot 100 Singles chart, which acts somewhat as a 25-song extension to the Hot 100.
- B "My People" did not enter the Hot R&B/Hip-Hop Songs chart, but peaked at number 15 on the Bubbling Under R&B/Hip-Hop Singles chart, which acts somewhat as a 25-song extension to the R&B/Hip-Hop Songs chart.
- C "What Is It" did not enter the Hot R&B/Hip-Hop Songs chart, but peaked at number 9 on the Bubbling Under R&B/Hip-Hop Singles chart, which acts somewhat as a 25-song extension to the R&B/Hip-Hop Songs chart.
- D "Pop It 4 Pimp" did not enter the Hot R&B/Hip-Hop Songs chart, but peaked at number 15 on the Bubbling Under R&B/Hip-Hop Singles chart, which acts somewhat as a 25-song extension to the R&B/Hip-Hop Songs chart.
- E "I Don't Love Her" did not enter the Hot R&B/Hip-Hop Songs chart, but peaked at number 2 on the Bubbling Under R&B/Hip-Hop Singles chart, which acts somewhat as a 25-song extension to the R&B/Hip-Hop Songs chart.
