= Trill Entertainment Presents: All or Nothing =

Compilation album by Lil Boosie, Webbie, Lil Trill & Trill Fam
- Released: November 9, 2010
- Recorded: 2010
- Studio: Trill Studios
- Genre: Southern hip hop; gangsta rap
- Length: 1:13:31
- Label: Trill; Asylum; WB; WMGreen
- Producer: Turk (exec.); Mel (exec.); B Hitz; Big Wayne; BJ; Devin B.; DJ B Real; J-Buck; Mouse; Q Red; S-8ighty

Trill Fam chronology
Trill Entertainment Presents: Survival of the Fittest (2007)	Trill Entertainment Presents: All or Nothing (2010)	Lil Trill & The Trill Fam (2013)

Lil' Boosie chronology
Incarcerated (2010)	Trill Entertainment Presents: All or Nothing (2010)	Lil Trill & The Trill Fam (2013)

Webbie chronology
Savage Life 2 (2008)	Trill Entertainment Presents: All or Nothing (2010)	Savage Life 3 (2011)

Foxx chronology
Street Gossip (2007)	Trill Entertainment Presents: All or Nothing (2010)	Trilluminati (2013)

Singles from Trill Entertainment Presents: All or Nothing
- 1. "My People" Released: August 14, 2010; 2. "Turn the Beat Up" Released: September 24, 2010

Professional ratings
Review scores
Source	Rating
AllMusic	3.5/5 stars
HipHopDX	2/5

Trill Entertainment Presents: All or Nothing is the second compilation album by American hip hop record label Trill Entertainment. It was released on November 9, 2010, with distribution via Asylum Records and Warner Bros. Records. Recording sessions took place at Trill Studios in Baton Rouge, Louisiana. Production was handled by in-house producer Mouse, as well as BJ, J Buck, B Hitz, Big Wayne, Devin B., DJ B Real, Q Red, S-8ighty, with Turk & Mel serving as executive producers. It features contributions from the label's roster Lil' Boosie, Webbie, Lil' Trill, Lil Phat, Foxx, Mouse, Shell, Kim McCoy, Big Head and Kade, featuring fellow Louisiana-based rapper Birdman. The album peaked at number 49 on the Billboard 200.

== Singles ==
The album's lead single "My People" performed by an American rapper Webbie, was released on August 14, 2010. "Turn the Beat Up" performed by Trill Fam, was released as the album's second single on September 24, 2010.

== Track listing ==
No.	Title	Performer(s)	Length
1.	"Showin' Up" (performed by Lil Trill and Lil Boosie)	Q Red	4:05
2.	"Do It Bigger" (performed by Lil' Phat, Webbie and Birdman)	J Buck	4:17
3.	"Turn the Beat Up" (performed by Mouse, Lil Trill, Foxx, Lil' Phat and Webbie)	Mouse	3:45
4.	"My People" (performed by Webbie)	J Buck	4:05
5.	"Rubbin' on My Head (Remix)" (performed by Mouse, Lil Boosie and Lil Trill)	Mouse	4:50
6.	"Drug Trade" (performed by Big Head, Foxx and Shell)	BJ	4:28
7.	"Count My Money Backwards" (performed by Lil' Phat and Webbie)	DJ B Real	4:16
8.	"Ducked Off" (performed by Mouse, Shell and Lil' Phat)	Mouse	4:52
9.	"#1 Girl" (performed by Lil Trill)	S-8ighty	3:22
10.	"That's My Baby" (performed by Lil' Phat, Mouse and Lil Trill)	Mouse	3:57
11.	"Secret" (performed by Kade)	Devin B.	3:41
12.	"Thug Life" (performed by Shell and Foxx)	Mouse	4:00
13.	"My Age" (performed by Lil' Phat, Webbie and Lil Trill)	Big Wayne	5:21
14.	"Memories" (performed by Lil Boosie and Webbie)	BJ	4:23
15.	"Lay Me Down" (performed by Lil Boosie, Shell and Webbie)	BJ	4:15
16.	"I Miss You" (performed by Kim McCoy)	B Hitz	3:48
17.	"Where Would I Be" (performed by Foxx, Big Head, Webbie and Lil Boosie)	BJ	6:05
Total length:			1:13:31

== Personnel ==
- Webster "Webbie" Gradney – performer (tracks: 2–4, 7, 13–15, 17)
- Marcus "Lil' Trill" Bennett – performer (tracks: 1, 3, 5, 9, 10, 13)
- Melvin "Lil' Phat" Vernell III – performer (tracks: 2, 3, 7, 8, 10, 13)
- Torence "Lil' Boosie" Hatch – performer (tracks: 1, 5, 14, 15, 17)
- Jeremy "Mouse" Allen – performer (tracks: 3, 5, 8, 10), producer (tracks: 3, 5, 8, 10, 12)
- Jonathan "Foxx" Reed – performer (tracks: 3, 6, 12, 17)
- Shelton "Shell" Martin – performer (tracks: 6, 8, 12, 15)
- D. "Big Head" Johnson – performer (tracks: 6, 17)
- Bryan "Birdman" Williams – performer (track 2)
- Kade – performer (track 11)
- Kimberly Lynette McCoy – performer (track 16)
- Bruce "BJ" Rome – producer (tracks: 6, 14, 15, 17)
- Jeremy "J Buck" Magee – producer (tracks: 2, 4)
- Quorey "Q Red" Speights – producer (track 1)
- Marlon "DJ B-Real" Clark – producer (track 7)
- Dave Corven "S-8ighty" Welcome – producer (track 9)
- Devin B. – producer (track 11)
- "Big Wayne" Nathaniel Dabney – producer (track 13)
- B Hitz – producer (track 16)
- David West – mixing, engineering
- Jason Dillon – engineering, A&R
- Bernie Grundman – mastering
- Mel – executive producer, A&R
- Turk – executive producer, A&R

== Chart history ==
Chart (2010)	Peak position
US Billboard 200	49
US Top R&B/Hip-Hop Albums (Billboard)	8
US Top Rap Albums (Billboard)	5
US Indie Store Album Sales (Billboard)	11
