= BET: Uncut =

American hip hop and R&B music video show

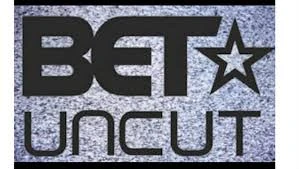
- BET: Uncut
- Created by: Stephen G. Hill
- Country of origin: United States
- No. of episodes: 1,203

Production
- Producer: Susan John-Baptiste
- Running time: 60 minutes

Original release
- Network: BET
- Release: September 12, 2000 – July 8, 2006

BET: Uncut is a defunct music video block program that aired on BET from September 2000 until July 2006. The videos contained within the show featured mature content, including highly sexualized imagery, violent lyrics, etc. The content assured the program a permanent TV Parental Guidelines rating of TV-14, later TV-MA, with a 'viewer discretion' advisory leading into the start of each segment of the show. Uncut mainly aired on Wednesdays through Sundays at 3 a.m. EST. This block program primarily gave a spotlight to songs by artists who couldn't air on regular daytime programming blocks like RapCity, 106 & Park, etc. Throughout UnCut's airing, they showed music videos that did air on 106 & Park, Videolink, and Rap City, along with its exclusively Uncut music videos to keep the hour-long block ongoing. Examples of non-sexually explicit videos that aired on other blocks would be Give Me That by Webbie & Bun B, Where the Party At by Jagged Edge, Rep It Wit My Heart by Troy Ave, Shine by Lil Wayne, etc.

Its last episode aired on July 8, 2006, and was hosted by Jermaine Dupri at the Body Tap strip club, announcing that the block was no longer airing while throwing an "UnCut Going Away Party" The end credits of the final episode was a montage of all the music videos that aired on UnCut from 2000-2006 along with clips of hosts on there to the song It's So Hard to Say Goodbye to Yesterday by Boyz II Men. The network officially announced the cancellation of the show on July 25, 2006.

== Controversy ==
While the videos were lightly censored, the show's content has been the focus of controversy, with Nelly's video for "Tip Drill" by far the video with the most outcry among Uncut videos. For example, the Associated Press has reported that even some hip-hop artists such as Big Boi of Outkast thought the show was distasteful and could constitute soft porn. Likewise, individuals affiliated with historically black institutions such as Spelman College and Essence Magazine stated that the erotic imagery of the show falls outside of acceptable standards.

== False 'return' ==
On August 5, 2015, BET put out a release announcing the block's return on August 11. The 'relaunch' of the series proved to be merely a publicity stunt (especially as August 11 was a Tuesday evening compared to the weekend berth Uncut aired in the past), and after an intro with the imagery of Uncut, the actual series in the timeslot was the premiere of the BET revival of Punk'd, which had been announced earlier in the year. In February 2021, it was announced that BET Uncut was returning for Valentine's Day weekend, but was another prank by BET.

== Media spotlight ==
- The show was mentioned by rapper Joe Budden on the first verse his debut single "Pump It Up". MadeinTYO has a song called BET Uncut, featuring Smino & Chance The Rapper
- The show was mentioned by rapper Phonte from Little Brother on his featured verse on Drake’s “Think Good Thoughts” from his mixtape Comeback Season
