= Ghetto Stories =

Ghetto Stories may refer to:

- Ghetto Stories (Lil Boosie and Webbie album), 2003
- Swizz Beatz Presents G.H.E.T.T.O. Stories, a 2002 album by Swizz Beatz
- Ghetto Stories (film), a 2010 American crime film
