= Street Gossip =

Street Gossip may refer to:

- Street Gossip (Foxx album)
- Street Gossip (mixtape), a mixtape by Lil Baby
