= Street Gossip (album) =

Studio album by Foxx
- Released: October 2, 2007
- Studio: Trill Studios (Baton Rouge, Louisiana)
- Genre: Gangsta rap
- Length: 1:11:43
- Label: Trill; Asylum; Atlantic
- Producer: Turk (exec.); Mel (exec.); Mouse; Bruce Rome; DJ B Real; R. Young

Foxx chronology
| Trill Entertainment Presents: Survival of the Fittest (2007) | Street Gossip (2007) | Trill Entertainment Presents: All or Nothing (2010) |

Singles from Street Gossip
- 1. "Not Myself" Released: September 4, 2007

Street Gossip is the debut solo studio album by American rapper Foxx. It was released on October 2, 2007, through Trill Entertainment, Asylum Records and Atlantic Records. Recording sessions took place at Trill Studios in Baton Rouge, Louisiana. Production was handled by Jeremy "Mouse" Allen, Bruce "BJ" Rome, Marlon "B Real" Clark and R. Young, with Turk & Mel serving as executive producers. The album features guest appearances from Big Head, Lil Phat, Webbie, Paul Wall, T-Pain and Trey Songz.

The album peaked at No. 144 on the Billboard 200 albums chart, at No. 21 on the Top R&B/Hip-Hop Albums chart, and at No. 12 on the Top Rap Albums chart in the United States. It was supported by a single titled "Not Myself".

== Track listing ==
| No. | Title | Producer(s) | Length |
|---|---|---|---|
| 1. | "I Got It" | Mouse | 4:04 |
| 2. | "I Drank" (featuring Webbie) | Mouse | 3:46 |
| 3. | "Not Myself" | Bruce Rome | 4:29 |
| 4. | "Leanin'" (featuring Paul Wall) | Mouse | 4:16 |
| 5. | "Air It Out" (featuring Big Head) | Mouse | 4:39 |
| 6. | "Bounce" (featuring T-Pain) | Mouse | 4:48 |
| 7. | "Know It's Good" (featuring Big Head) | DJ B Real | 4:41 |
| 8. | "Big Mouth" (featuring Lil Phat) | Mouse | 4:23 |
| 9. | "Beat It Up" | R. Young | 3:58 |
| 10. | "Original" | Mouse | 4:38 |
| 11. | "I'm Sick" | Bruce Rome | 4:25 |
| 12. | "She Said" (featuring Trey Songz) | R. Young | 4:45 |
| 13. | "Exclusive" | Bruce Rome | 4:25 |
| 14. | "I'm On" | DJ B Real | 4:05 |
| 15. | "Rubberband Knots" (featuring Lil Phat) | Mouse | 5:10 |
| 16. | "Twanky Thangs" | Mouse | 5:11 |
| Total length: | | | 1:11:43 |

== Personnel ==
- Jonathan Reed – main artist, vocals
- D. "Big Head" Johnson – featured artist (tracks: 5, 7)
- Melvin Vernell III – featured artist (tracks: 8, 15)
- Webster Gradney – featured artist (track 2)
- Paul Michael Slayton – featured artist (track 4)
- Faheem Rashad Najm – featured artist (track 6)
- Tremaine Aldon Neverson – featured artist (track 12)
- Jeremy Allen – producer (tracks: 1, 2, 4–6, 8, 10, 15, 16)
- Bruce Rome – producer (tracks: 3, 11, 13)
- Marlon Clark – producer (tracks: 7, 14)
- R. Young – producer (tracks: 9, 12)
- David West – mixing
- Mark Kidney – mastering
- Mel – executive producer
- Turk – executive producer
- King Yella – photography

== Chart history ==
| Chart (2007) | Peak position |
|---|---|
| US Billboard 200 | 144 |
| US Top R&B/Hip-Hop Albums (Billboard) | 21 |
| US Top Rap Albums (Billboard) | 12 |
