= Give Me That =

Give Me That may refer to:

- Give Me That (EP), a 2024 EP by WayV, or the song of the same name
- "Give Me That" (song), a 2005 song by Webbie
- "Give Me That", a 2020 song by Erica Banks
