= Bad Azz (album) =

Studio album by Lil' Boosie
- Released: October 24, 2006
- Recorded: 2005–06
- Studio: Trill Studios (Baton Rouge, LA)
- Genre: Hip hop
- Length: 1:15:31
- Label: Trill; Asylum
- Producer: BJ; Mouse

Lil' Boosie chronology
Gangsta Musik (2004)	Bad Azz (2006)	Trill Entertainment Presents: Survival of the Fittest (2007)

Singles from Bad Azz
- 1. "Zoom" Released: September 29, 2006

Professional ratings
Review scores
Source	Rating
RapReviews	4.5/10

Bad Azz is the third solo studio album and major label debut by American rapper Lil' Boosie. It was released on October 24, 2006, via Trill Entertainment and Asylum Records. Recording sessions took place at Trill Studios in Baton Rouge, Louisiana. Production was handled by Mouse and BJ. It features guest appearances from Webbie, Big Head, Foxx, Pimp C and Yung Joc. The album debuted at number 18 on the US Billboard 200, selling 41,000 copies in the first week. Its lead single, "Zoom", made it to number 61 on the US Billboard Hot 100.

== Track listing ==
No.	Title	Writer(s)	Producer(s)	Length
1.	"When You Gonna Drop"	Torrence Hatch	Mouse	4:43
2.	"Set It Off"	Hatch; M. Roach; Jeremy Allen	Mouse	4:46
3.	"Zoom" (featuring Yung Joc)	Hatch; Jasiel Robinson; Allen	Mouse	4:47
4.	"Movies"	Hatch	Mouse	4:17
5.	"That's What They Like"	Hatch; Roach; Allen	BJ; Mouse	3:48
6.	"I Remember"	Hatch	BJ	4:05
7.	"Soft to Hard" (featuring Foxx and Big Head)	Hatch; Jonathan Reed; D. Johnson	BJ	4:59
8.	"My Struggle"	Hatch	BJ	3:24
9.	"I'm Mad"	Hatch	Mouse	5:09
10.	"My Nigga"	Hatch; Roach; Allen	Mouse	4:47
11.	"I Represent" (featuring Webbie)	Hatch; Webster Gradney	BJ	3:26
12.	"Hatin'"	Hatch; Roach; Bruce Rome	Mouse	4:01
13.	"Fuck You" (featuring Webbie & Pimp C)	Hatch; Gradney; Chad Butler	Mouse	4:57
14.	"Exciting" (featuring Webbie)	Hatch; Gradney	BJ; Mouse	4:17
15.	"Distant Lover"	Hatch	BJ	5:07
16.	"Goin' Thru Some Thangs"	Hatch	Mouse	4:43
17.	"Smoking on Purple" (featuring Webbie)	Hatch; Gradney	Mouse	4:13
Total length:				1:15:31

== Personnel ==
- Torence "Lil' Boosie" Hatch – vocals
- Jasiel "Yung Joc" Robinson – vocals (track 3)
- Jonathan "Foxx" Reed – vocals (track 7)
- D. "Big Head" Johnson – vocals (track 7)
- Webster "Webbie" Gradney – vocals (tracks: 11, 13, 14, 17)
- Chad "Pimp C" Butler – vocals (track 13)
- Jeremy "Mouse" Allen – producer (tracks: 1–5, 9, 10, 12–14, 16, 17)
- Bruce "BJ" Rome – producer (tracks: 5–8, 11, 14, 15)
- Mark Kidney – mixing, mastering
- Kevin "Mr. Soul" Harp – art direction, design
- Byron Gillison – design, logo
- King Yella – photography

== Charts ==
=== Weekly charts ===
Chart (2006)	Peak position
US Billboard 200	18
US Top R&B/Hip-Hop Albums (Billboard)	2
US Top Rap Albums (Billboard)	1
US Indie Store Album Sales (Billboard)	3

=== Year-end charts ===
Chart (2007)	Peak position
US Top R&B/Hip-Hop Albums (Billboard)	70
