= Touch Down 2 Cause Hell =

Studio album by Boosie Badazz
- Released: May 26, 2015
- Recorded: 2014–15
- Genre: Hip hop
- Length: 72:13
- Labels: Trill; Atlantic; WMGreen
- Producers: London on da Track; Mouse On tha Track; Big Wayne; Beat Billionaire; Kenoe; Samuel AsH; Black Metaphor; Kane Beatz; Abby "Samir" Urbina; J Reid; BJ Beatz; Knucklehead; P-Lo

Boosie Badazz chronology
Incarcerated (2010)	Touch Down 2 Cause Hell (2015)	In My Feelings. (Goin' Thru It) (2016)

Singles from Touch Down 2 Cause Hell
- 1. "On That Level" Released: November 17, 2014; 2. "Like a Man" Released: November 17, 2014; 3. "Retaliation" Released: May 4, 2015

Touch Down 2 Cause Hell is the sixth studio album by American rapper Boosie Badazz. The album was released on May 26, 2015, by Trill Entertainment and Atlantic Records.

== Background ==
In April 2014, Boosie Badazz announced his sixth studio album would be titled Touchdown 2 Cause Hell and would be released on July 15, 2014. In May 2014, Badazz explained the album title to HotNewHipHop, saying:

It means 'I'm back, and I'm better than ever. When you cause hell everybody know about it, and everybody know what's up with Boosie... I'm finna open up everybody's eyes. Even the people's eyes who was closed, who was doubtin' me. I'm finna touch down, cause hell, and just take over the rap game, period.

== Singles ==
"Like a Man" featuring Rich Homie Quan, was released as the album's second single on November 17, 2014. "Retaliation" was released as the album's third single on May 4, 2015. Both were mixed by Cameron Cartee.

== Critical reception ==
Professional ratings
Aggregate scores
Source	Rating
Metacritic	74/100
Review scores
Source	Rating
AllMusic	4/5 stars
Billboard	3.5/5 stars
HipHopDX	4/5 stars
Los Angeles Times	3/4 stars
Pitchfork Media	7.4/10
XXL	(XL)

Touch Down 2 Cause Hell received positive reviews from music critics. At Metacritic, which assigns a normalized rating out of 100 to reviews from critics, the album received an average score of 74, which indicates "generally favorable reviews", based on 10 reviews. Marcus Dowling of HipHopDX said, "Released from prison, Boosie turns over a new leaf on Touch Down 2 Cause Hell. An honest man now doing honest work, his mental clarity benefits his lyrical directness. The end result is an album that is as much a wild party as it is brutally honest. In achieving each of these goals without feeling too much like it’s placating Boosie’s lifelong fans or pop radio expectations, it excels in walking a fine line and being a tremendous listen."

== Commercial performance ==
Touch Down 2 Cause Hell debuted at number three on the Billboard 200, selling 59,000 copies in the United States. Following its second week on sale, the album had sold 78,000 copies.

== Track listing ==
No.	Title	Producer(s)	Length
1.	"Intro – Get Em Boosie"	Black Metaphor	1:16
2.	"Window of My Eyes"	Roc & Mayne; Kenoe	4:39
3.	"Mercy on My Soul" (featuring Jeezy and Akelee)	Kenoe; Samuel AsH	5:15
4.	"Like a Man" (featuring Rich Homie Quan)	Mouse On tha Track	4:27
5.	"On Deck" (featuring Young Thug)	P-Lo	4:07
6.	"Retaliation"	London on da Track	3:05
7.	"No Juice"	Mouse On tha Track	3:32
8.	"On That Level" (featuring Webbie)	Abby "Samir" Urbina	3:36
9.	"Hip Hop Hooray" (featuring Webbie)	Knucklehead	3:19
10.	"Mr. Miyagi"	Beat Billionaire	4:34
11.	"Black Heaven" (featuring Keyshia Cole and J. Cole)	Kenoe; Samuel AsH	4:09
12.	"She Don’t Love Me" (featuring Chris Brown)	BJ Beatz	3:38
13.	"All I Know" (featuring PJ)	Kane Beatz	4:20
14.	"Drop Top Music" (featuring Rick Ross)	Big Wayne	3:22
15.	"Spoil You" (featuring T.I.)	Kenoe	4:32
16.	"How She Got Her Name"	J Reid	4:07
17.	"Kicking Clouds"	Kenoe	4:07
18.	"Hands Up"	J Reid	2:33
19.	"I'm Sorry"	Abby "Samir" Urbina	3:33

== Charts ==
=== Weekly charts ===
Chart (2015)	Peak position
US Billboard 200	3
US Top R&B/Hip-Hop Albums (Billboard)	2

=== Year-end charts ===
Chart (2015)	Position
US Top R&B/Hip-Hop Albums (Billboard)	28
