= Trill Entertainment Presents: Survival of the Fittest =

Compilation album by Lil Boosie, Webbie, Foxx & Trill Fam
- Released: May 22, 2007
- Recorded: 2006–07
- Genre: Southern hip hop; gangsta rap
- Length: 1:07:49
- Label: Trill; Asylum
- Producer: Turk (exec.); Mel (exec.); BJ; Mouse

Trill Fam chronology
Trill Entertainment Presents: Survival of the Fittest (2007)	Trill Entertainment Presents: All or Nothing (2010)

Lil Boosie chronology
Bad Azz (2006)	Trill Entertainment Presents: Survival of the Fittest (2007)	Superbad: The Return of Boosie Bad Azz (2009)

Webbie chronology
Savage Life (2005)	Trill Entertainment Presents: Survival of the Fittest (2007)	Savage Life 2 (2008)

Foxx chronology
Street Gossip (2007)	Trill Entertainment Presents: Survival of the Fittest (2007)	Trilluminati (2013)

Singles from Trill Entertainment Presents: Survival of the Fittest
- 1. "Wipe Me Down" Released: January 2007

Professional ratings
Review scores
Source	Rating
HipHopDX	2/5
RapReviews	5.5/10
XXL	L

Trill Entertainment Presents: Survival of the Fittest is a compilation album by American hip hop record label Trill Entertainment. It was released on May 22, 2007, with distribution via Asylum Records. Production was handled by in-house producer Mouse, as well as BJ, with Turk & Mel serving as executive producers. It features contributions from the label's roster Lil' Boosie, Webbie, Foxx, Big Head, 3 Deep (Lil Phat, Shell and Mouse) and Soulja Boy. The album peaked at number 17 on the Billboard 200.

== Track listing ==
No.	Title	Producer(s)	Length
1.	"Say Round" (performed by Big Head, Lil' Boosie, Webbie, Foxx and Mouse)	Mouse	5:21
2.	"Do It Stick It" (performed by 3 Deep)	Mouse	4:34
3.	"Wipe Me Down" (performed by Foxx)	Mouse	4:50
4.	"Adios" (performed by Foxx, Lil' Boosie, Big Head and Webbie)	Mouse	5:24
5.	"Politician Networkin" (performed by Big Head)	Mouse	4:17
6.	"Same Old Shit" (performed by Lil' Boosie, Webbie and Big Head)	Mouse	4:21
7.	"Materialistic Bitch" (performed by Soulja Boy, Lil' Phat and Shell)	Mouse	4:51
8.	"Swangin" (performed by Lil' Boosie and Webbie)	BJ	3:46
9.	"Watch My Shoes" (performed by 3 Deep)	Mouse	4:36
10.	"U Got Cake" (performed by Webbie, Big Head and Foxx)	Mouse	4:07
11.	"Bout Dat" (performed by Webbie and Foxx)	BJ	4:06
12.	"Leave the Tags On" (performed by Big Head, Lil' Boosie and Foxx)	Mouse	3:58
13.	"Thug Me Like That" (performed by Lil' Boosie)	BJ	4:51
14.	"Got Me Bent" (performed by Webbie, Lil' Boosie and Foxx)	Mouse	4:15
15.	"Wipe Me Down (Remix)" (performed by Foxx, Lil' Boosie and Webbie)	Mouse	4:32
Total length:			1:07:49

== Personnel ==
- Jonathan "Foxx" Reed – performer (tracks: 1, 3, 4, 10–12, 14, 15)
- Webster "Webbie" Gradney – performer (tracks: 1, 4, 6, 8, 10, 11, 14, 15)
- Torence "Lil' Boosie" Hatch – performer (tracks: 1, 4, 6, 8, 12–15)
- D. "Big Head" Johnson – performer (tracks: 1, 4–6, 10, 12)
- Jeremy "Mouse" Allen – performer (tracks: 1, 2, 9), producer (tracks: 1–7, 9, 10, 12, 14, 15)
- Shelton "Shell" Martin – performer (tracks: 2, 7, 9)
- Melvin "Lil' Phat" Vernell III – performer (tracks: 2, 7, 9)
- Soulja Boy – performer (track 7)
- Bruce "BJ" Rome – producer (tracks: 8, 11, 13)
- Mel – executive producer
- Turk – executive producer

== Charts ==
=== Weekly charts ===
Chart (2007)	Peak position
US Billboard 200	17
US Top R&B/Hip-Hop Albums (Billboard)	3
US Top Rap Albums (Billboard)	2

=== Year-end charts ===
Chart (2007)	Position
US Top R&B/Hip-Hop Albums (Billboard)	84
