= BooPac =

Studio album by Boosie Badazz
- Released: December 15, 2017
- Studio: Trill Studios (Atlanta, Georgia)
- Genre: Hip hop
- Length: 90:36
- Label: Atlantic
- Producer: Antonio Walker; A. Samir Urbina; Brandon O. McDonald; Corey Dennard; Cornell Davis; Edwards Sharpe-Raymond; EveryBodyKnowStroud; Gene Hixon; J. Allen; Matthew Applewhite; Mykel Cook; PKA GNB; R. Maughan III; T. Roberts; Timothy Link

Boosie Badazz chronology
Penitentiary Chances (2016)	BooPac (2017)	Badazz 3.5 (2019)

Singles from BooPac
- 1. "God Wants Me to Ball" Released: 2017

Professional ratings
Review scores
Source	Rating
AllMusic	3.5/5 stars
HipHopDX	3.7/5

BooPac is the seventh solo studio album by American rapper Boosie Badazz. It was released on December 15, 2017, via Trill Entertainment and Atlantic Recording Corporation. It features guest appearances from Yung Bleu, Anthony Hamilton, B. Will, Lee Banks, and London Jae. The album peaked at number 38 on the Billboard 200, number 16 on the Top R&B/Hip-Hop Albums and number 12 on the Top Rap Albums in the United States.

== Track listing ==
BooPac track listing
No.	Title	Writer(s)	Producer(s)	Length
1.	"Don Dada" (featuring B. Will and Lee Banks)	Torrence Hatch; Brian Wilcott; John Wright	J. Allen p.k.a. MouseOnDaTrack	3:26
2.	"Real Shooter"	Hatch	Mykel Cook p.k.a. MykelOnTheBeat	3:56
3.	"God Wants Me to Ball" (featuring London Jae)	Hatch	EveryBodyKnowStroud	4:21
4.	"Webbie I Remember"	Hatch; Webster Gradney Jr.	Corey Dennard	3:13
5.	"Cocaine Fever"	Hatch	Edwards Sharpe-Raymond p.k.a. E Sharpe	3:15
6.	"Liar"	Hatch	Antonio Walker	4:02
7.	"I Hope You Make It" (featuring Anthony Hamilton)	Hatch; Anthony Cornelius Hamilton	Mykel Cook p.k.a. MykelOnTheBeat	3:31
8.	"Me & Mama"	Hatch	Mykel Cook p.k.a. MykelOnTheBeat	3:16
9.	"I'm That Nigga Now"	Hatch	Matthew Applewhite p.k.a. Jitthe Beast	3:16
10.	"Me, Myself & I"	Hatch	T. Roberts	3:21
11.	"Different Cloth"	Hatch	Timothy Link p.k.a. TimmyDaHitMan	3:03
12.	"My Pain Runs Deep"	Hatch	Cornell Davis p.k.a. PlayBoyOnTheBeat	4:24
13.	"Everything"	Hatch	Matthew Applewhite p.k.a. Jitthe Beast	3:56
14.	"Heartless Hearts"	Hatch	Timothy Link p.k.a. TimmyDaHitMan	2:52
15.	"You Don't Know Me Like That"	Hatch	Mykel Cook p.k.a. MykelOnTheBeat	4:19
16.	"Get Ya Mind Right"	Hatch	Brandon O. McDonald p.k.a. Big B on da Track	3:31
17.	"Real Friends"	Hatch	Matthew Applewhite p.k.a. Jitthe Beast	3:03
18.	"Let Me Know" (featuring Yung Bleu)	Hatch; Jeremy Biddle	Gene Hixon p.k.a. Al Geno	3:10
19.	"Motherless Child"	Hatch	Mykel Cook p.k.a. MykelOnTheBeat	4:07
20.	"I Testify"	Hatch	Mykel Cook p.k.a. MykelOnTheBeat	5:11
21.	"Semi on Me" (featuring Yung Bleu)	Hatch; Biddle	A. Samir Urbina; R. Maughan III	3:54
22.	"Wrong Role Model"	Hatch	Matthew Applewhite p.k.a. Jitthe Beast	5:28
23.	"Get Me Outta Here"	Hatch	Mykel Cook p.k.a. MykelOnTheBeat	4:00
24.	"Trust Nobody"	Hatch	PKA GNB	3:17
Total length:				90:36

== Charts ==
Chart performance for BooPac
Chart (2018)	Peak position
US Billboard 200	38
US Top R&B/Hip-Hop Albums (Billboard)	16
US Top Rap Albums (Billboard)	12
