= Superbad: The Return of Boosie Bad Azz =

Studio album by Lil Boosie
- Released: September 15, 2009
- Recorded: 2008–09
- Studio: Trill Studios
- Genre: Hip hop
- Length: 70:55
- Labels: Trill; Asylum; Warner Bros.
- Producers: Turk (exec.); Mel (exec.); Big Wayne; BJ; DJ B Real; Guss; Mouse; Nard & B; Shonta; The Runners

Lil Boosie chronology
Trill Entertainment Presents: Survival of the Fittest (2007)	Superbad: The Return of Boosie Bad Azz (2009)	Incarcerated (2010)

Singles from Superbad: The Return of Boosie Bad Azz
- 1. "Better Believe It" Released: July 14, 2009

Professional ratings
Review scores
Source	Rating
AllMusic	3.5/5 stars
HipHopDX	3/5
RapReviews	5/10
XXL	3/5 (L)

Superbad: The Return of Boosie Bad Azz is the fourth solo studio album by American rapper Lil Boosie. It was released on September 15, 2009, via Trill Entertainment, Asylum Records and Warner Bros. Records. Production was handled by DJ B Real, BJ, Mouse, Big Wayne, Guss, Nard & B, Shonta and The Runners, with Turk & Mel serving as executive producers. It features guest appearances from Lil Phat, Mouse, Webbie, Bobby V, Foxx, Kade, Lil Trill, Trina and Young Jeezy.

The album reached number 7 on the Billboard 200, number 4 on the Top R&B/Hip-Hop Albums, number 3 on the Top Rap Albums and number 9 on the Tastemaker Albums in the United States. Its lead single "Better Believe It" peaked at No. 40 on the Hot R&B/Hip-Hop Songs and No. 23 on the Hot Rap Songs.

== Track listing ==
No.	Title	Writer(s)	Producer(s)	Length
1.	"My Avenue!!" (featuring Lil' Phat and Lil Trill)	Torrence Hatch; Melvin Vernell III; Marcus Bennett	The Runners	4:10
2.	"Top Notch" (featuring Mouse and Lil' Phat)	Hatch; Jeremy Allen; Vernell III	Mouse	4:14
3.	"Better Believe It" (featuring Young Jeezy and Webbie)	Hatch; Jay Jenkins; Webster Gradney	Mouse	4:57
4.	"Lawd Have Mercy"	Hatch	Guss	3:51
5.	"I'm a Dog" (featuring Lil' Phat)	Hatch; Vernell III	DJ B Real	4:36
6.	"No Mercy"	Hatch	DJ B Real	4:51
7.	"My Levi's" (featuring Lil' Phat and Webbie)	Hatch; Vernell III; Gradney	DJ B Real	4:28
8.	"Bullshit"	Hatch	Big Wayne	5:44
9.	"Who Can Love U" (featuring Bobby V)	Hatch; Bobby Wilson	Nard & B	3:29
10.	"Miss Kissin' on You" (featuring Trina and Kade)	Hatch; Katrina Taylor	DJ B Real	5:18
11.	"Pain"	Hatch	BJ	3:33
12.	"Loose as a Goose" (featuring Foxx and Mouse)	Hatch; Jonathan Reed; Allen	DJ B Real	4:13
13.	"Clips and Choppers" (featuring Lil' Phat)	Hatch; Vernell III	DJ B Real	4:40
14.	"Bank Roll"	Hatch	BJ	4:19
15.	"Crayola"	Hatch	BJ	4:41
16.	"Mind of a Maniac"	Hatch	Shonta	3:44
Total length:				1:10:48

== Chart history ==
Chart (2009)	Peak position
US Billboard 200	7
US Top R&B/Hip-Hop Albums (Billboard)	4
US Top Rap Albums (Billboard)	3
US Indie Store Album Sales (Billboard)	9
