= For My Thugz =

Studio album by Lil Boosie
- Released: January 1, 2002
- Recorded: 2001
- Genre: Hip-hop; gangsta rap
- Length: 63:53
- Label: Trill Entertainment

Lil Boosie chronology
Youngest of da Camp (2000)	For My Thugz (2002)	Ghetto Stories (2003)

For My Thugz is the second studio album by American rapper Lil Boosie. It was released on January 1, 2002, by Trill Entertainment. As of 2013, the album has sold 90,000 in the United States.

== Track listing ==
No.	Title	Producer(s)	Length
1.	"Gangsta Shit"	Tru Dawg	3:42
2.	"How You Feel"	Dolby D	4:06
3.	"My Nigga Then"	Tru Dawg	3:47
4.	"Bucked Up"	G	3:38
5.	"Cold Blooded" (featuring J-Von)	Steve Beelow	3:57
6.	"Wonder Why Your Child So Bad" (featuring Lil Q & Locco)	Lil Q	4:35
7.	"Head Busta" (featuring Pimp C)	Steve Beelow	3:38
8.	"Bout Dat"	Steve Beelow	4:15
9.	"World Wide Struggle"	Lil Q	4:10
10.	"For My Thugz"	Tru Dawg	3:57
11.	"Consequences"	Dolby D	4:07
12.	"Thug in My Life"	Lil Q	3:49
13.	"Listen Clear"	Tru Dawg	3:26
14.	"It's Going Down, Pt. 2" (featuring Big Head)	Lil Q	4:01
15.	"Gotta Get It" (featuring Webbie & Lil Q)	Lil Q	4:24
16.	"Waiting on Visit"	Tru Dawg	4:21
