= Zoom (Lil Boosie song) =

Single by Lil Boosie featuring Yung Joc

from the album Bad Azz
- Released: September 29, 2006
- Recorded: 2005
- Genre: Crunk; snap
- Length: 4:43
- Label: Trill Entertainment
- Songwriter(s): J. "Mouse" Allen; J. Robinson; T. Hatch
- Producer(s): Mouse

Lil Boosie singles chronology
"Zoom" (2006)	"Wipe Me Down" (2007)

Yung Joc singles chronology
"1st Time" (2006)	"Zoom" (2006)	"In the Hood" (2006)

"Zoom" is a single from American rapper Lil Boosie. It is the first single from his album, Bad Azz. The song features Yung Joc, and is written by J. "Mouse" Allen, J. Robinson, and T. Hatch. The single debuted on the Billboard Hot 100 at number 78 after spending several weeks under the top 100. It peaked at number 25 on the Hot R&B/Hip-Hop Songs chart and 14 on the Hot Rap Tracks chart. The video had heavy rotation on BET and had been on 106 & Park peaking at number 1 on the top 10 chart. The video featured Yung Joc's dance "The Joc-In".

The beat of this song was used by Lil Wayne on Da Drought 3 titled "Boom", Chamillionaire also used the beat on Mixtape Messiah 2 with his version, "International Money".

== Charts ==
Chart (2006)	Peak position
US Billboard Hot 100	61
US Hot R&B/Hip-Hop Songs (Billboard)	25
US Hot Rap Songs (Billboard)	14
