= I Miss You (Webbie song) =

Single by Webbie featuring LeToya Luckett

from the album Savage Life 2
- Released: March 10, 2008
- Recorded: 2007
- Studio: Trill, Baton Rouge, Louisiana
- Genre: Hip hop; R&B
- Length: 3:48
- Label: Trill/Asylum
- Songwriters: Webster Gradney; Lionel Richie; Lyrica Anderson; B. Rome; M. Roach
- Producer: BJ

Webbie singles chronology
"Independent" (2007)	"I Miss You" (2008)	"Better Believe It" (2008)

LeToya singles chronology
"Almost Made Ya" (2007)	"I Miss You" (2008)	"Not Anymore" (2009)

"I Miss You" is a R&B/hip hop song written by Webbie, Mouse and Mannie Fresh for Webbie's second studio album, Savage Life 2 (2008). The song samples Diana Ross' "Missing You", and features LeToya Luckett. It was originally going to feature singer Kelis, but she was replaced for unknown reasons. While the song is about Webbie being on the road and looking forward to returning home to his woman, it is dedicated to Houston rappers that recently have died, mainly for UGK member Pimp C. The song was leaked to the internet on February 5, 2008, and was officially released (for commercial purposes) on March 10, 2008.

== Music video ==
The video was shot in Brooklyn, New York, and was directed by Edwin Decena, who also directed videos for artists such as Plies' "Shawty", Jaheim's "Never", Rich Boy's "Let's Get This Paper" and others. Although Luckett is not physically present in the video (due to her being part of JD Lawernce's play Rumors), cameo appearances are made by Rick Ross and Lil Phat among others.

== Track listing ==
CD single

1. "I Miss You (Radio Version)"
2. "I Miss You (Remix Version)"

== Credits and personnel ==
- Vocals: LeToya Luckett

== Chart performance ==
The song entered the Billboard Hot R&B/Hip-Hop Songs chart at number 65, peaking at number 27 on April 25, 2008.

Chart (2008)	Peak position
US Billboard Hot R&B/Hip-Hop Songs	27
