= Savage Life 4 =

Studio album by Webbie
- Released: November 19, 2013
- Recorded: 2012–2013
- Genre: Hip hop
- Length: 60:04
- Label: Trill; Ingrooves

Webbie chronology
Savage Life 3 (2011)	Savage Life 4 (2013)	Savage Life V (2016)

Singles from Savage Life 4
- 1. "What I Do" Released: April 16, 2013; 2. "Bad Bitch 2" Released: October 8, 2013

Savage Life 4 is the fourth studio album by American rapper Webbie. The album was released on November 19, 2013, by Trill Entertainment. The album features guest appearances from Lil Phat, Lloyd, Blake and Lil Trill.

== Singles ==
On April 16, 2013, the album's first single "What I Do" was released. On May 20, 2013, the music video was released for "What I Do". On October 8, 2013, the album's second single "Bad Bitch 2" was released. On November 19, 2013, the music video was released for "Bad Bitch 2".

== Critical reception ==
Professional ratings
Review scores
Source	Rating
AllMusic	2.5/5 stars

Upon its release Savage Life 4 was met with generally mixed reviews from music critics. David Jeffries of AllMusic gave the album two and a half stars out of five, stating that the album's "gutter-minded songs are the easy and effortless highlights of the [album], coming off as much more natural than the plays for radio," before concluding, "Trim away the fat and there's a lean, and quite mean, mixtape inside this scattershot album."

== Commercial performance ==
The album debuted at number 27 on the Billboard 200, with first-week sales of 11,918 copies in the United States.

== Track listing ==
No.	Title	Length
1.	"I'm Back"	2:24
2.	"Fucked Her" (featuring Lil Phat)	3:46
3.	"Bad Bitch 2"	4:20
4.	"Make It Back"	3:37
5.	"Realest" (featuring Lloyd)	3:44
6.	"Another One"	3:48
7.	"Big"	4:05
8.	"Sugar"	4:04
9.	"What I Do"	3:12
10.	"Mine"	4:00
11.	"Fine Ass" (featuring Blake)	4:12
12.	"Look At Me Now"	3:48
13.	"Shake What Ya Mamma Gave Ya" (featuring Lil Trill)	3:38
14.	"Sneaky"	4:15
15.	"Too Much"	3:17
16.	"She Say"	4:29
17.	"What U Mean"	4:01

== Charts ==
=== Weekly charts ===
Chart (2013)	Peak position
US Billboard 200	27
US Top R&B/Hip-Hop Albums (Billboard)	7
US Independent Albums (Billboard)	3

=== Year-end charts ===
Chart (2014)	Position
US Top R&B/Hip-Hop Albums (Billboard)	99
