= Show da World =

Single by Lil Boosie and Webbie featuring Kiara
- Released: January 9, 2014
- Recorded: 2009–13
- Genre: Hip hop
- Length: 4:23
- Label: Trill Entertainment, Asylum Records, Atlantic Records
- Producer: J.Reid

Lil Boosie singles chronology
"Better Believe It" (2009)	"Show da World" (2014)

Webbie singles chronology
"Better Believe It" (2009)	"Show Da World" (2014)

"Show da World" is a song by American rappers Lil Boosie and Webbie. It was intended to be the first single off Touchdown 2 Cause Hell, but never made the final track list. The song was released on January 9, 2014 by Trill Entertainment, Asylum Records, and Atlantic Records. "Show Da World" also features singer Kiara. The song peaked at number 35 on the US Billboard Hot R&B/Hip-Hop Songs chart.

== Background ==
Leading up to rapper Lil Boosie's March 2014 release from prison, a single was released on January 8, 2014, titled "Show Da World" featuring an unreleased verses from Boosie, along with a verse from label-mate Webbie and singer Kiara. It was rumored that the song was going to be on Boosie and Webbie's second collaboration album Gangsta Muzik II. However, it is now set to appear on Boosie's sixth studio album Touchdown 2 Cause Hell.

== Music video ==
Following Boosie's release from prison, the majority of the music video for the song was filmed on March 10, 2014 in Baton Rouge, Louisiana. It was the first music video Boosie filmed following his release. Additional scenes were filmed in major cities such as, Los Angeles, Washington DC, New Orleans, New York City, Atlanta, Dallas, Houston and London. Then on March 16, 2014, a behind the scenes video was released to promote the video's release.

The full version of the music video was released on April 6, 2014. It was directed by G. Visuals. The video features cameo appearances from Paul Wall, Bobby V, Slim Thug and DJ Drama. The black-and-white video portrays the support for Lil Boosie across the United States and United Kingdom as Boosie fans wear Trill Entertainment T-shirts from city to city.

== Remix ==
On April 23, 2014, Lil Boosie released a video previewing the song's official remix with K. Michelle. The remix, which removes Webbie and features new verses from Boosie was released on April 25, 2014.

== Charts ==
Chart (2014)	Peak position
US Bubbling Under Hot 100 (Billboard)	2
US Hot R&B/Hip-Hop Songs (Billboard)	28
US Hot Rap Songs (Billboard)	17
