= Savage Life 3 =

Studio album by Webbie
- Released: November 15, 2011
- Recorded: 2009–2011
- Genre: Southern hip hop, gangsta rap
- Length: 60:05
- Label: Trill; Fontana
- Producer: J Buc, DJ B-Real, Mouse On Tha Track, Q. Redd, Big Wayne, Carl Mo, Bruce "BJ" Rome, Jay Mane, K.T.

Webbie chronology
Savage Life 2 (2008)	Savage Life 3 (2011)	Savage Life 4 (2013)

Singles from Savage Life 3
- 1. "Ride" Released: 2011

Savage Life 3 is the third studio album by American rapper Webbie. The album was released on November 15, 2011. The album debuted at number 17 on the US Billboard 200 with 30,000 copies sold in its first week.

== Track listing ==
No.	Title	Producer(s)	Length
1.	"Baddest In Here"	DJ B-Real	3:46
2.	"What's Happenin'" (featuring Lil Phat)	Mouse On Tha Track	4:47
3.	"What You Want" (featuring Lil Trill)	Q. Redd	4:11
4.	"Shawty Know" (featuring Bobby V)	DJ B-Real	4:23
5.	"Trilla Than a Bitch" (featuring Lil Phat)	DJ B-Real	4:14
6.	"Right Now" (featuring Lil Trill & Lil Phat)	DJ B-Real	4:10
7.	"Keep Ya Head Up"	Savage	3:54
8.	"Bounce That" (featuring Lil Phat)	J Buc	3:40
9.	"Rubber Tonight"	Mouse On Tha Track	4:10
10.	"Momma"	Bruce "BJ" Rome	3:17
11.	"In Dis Bitch"	Mouse On Tha Track	4:04
12.	"Mo Ass"	Jay Mane	4:11
13.	"I Do Em All" (featuring K.T.)	K.T.	4:57
14.	"I Been Here"	Q. Redd	3:59
15.	"Pops I Luv U" (featuring Lil Phat)	Q. Redd	4:05
16.	"Made Nigga"	Bruce "BJ" Rome	4:10

== Charts ==
=== Weekly charts ===
Chart (2011)	Peak position
US Billboard 200	17
US Top R&B/Hip-Hop Albums (Billboard)	3
US Independent Albums (Billboard)	3

=== Year-end charts ===
Chart (2012)	Position
US Independent Albums (Billboard)	45
US Top R&B/Hip-Hop Albums (Billboard)	68
