= Incarcerated (album) =

Studio album by Lil Boosie
- Released: September 28, 2010
- Recorded: 2009–10
- Genre: Southern hip hop
- Length: 1:00:56
- Label: Trill; Asylum; WB; WMGreen
- Producer: Turk (exec.); Mel (exec.); BJ; DJ B Real; Mouse; Savage; Supa Dave West

Lil Boosie chronology
Superbad: The Return of Boosie Bad Azz (2009)	Incarcerated (2010)	Trill Entertainment Presents: All or Nothing (2010)

Singles from Incarcerated
- 1. "Better Not Fight" Released: August 17, 2010

Professional ratings
Review scores
Source	Rating
AllMusic	3.5/5 stars
Spin	8/10 marks

Incarcerated is the fifth solo studio album by American rapper Lil' Boosie. It was released on September 28, 2010, via Trill Entertainment and Asylum Records. Production was handled by BJ, DJ B Real, Mouse, Savage, Supa Dave West and Q Red, with Turk & Mel serving as executive producers. It features guest appearances from Webbie, 3 Deep, Foxx, Lil' Trill, Big Head and K.T.

The album debuted at number 13 on the Billboard 200, number 6 on the Top R&B/Hip-Hop Albums and number 4 on the Top Rap Albums charts, selling 30,000 copies in the US in its first week. As of May 2015, the album has sold 146,000 copies in the United States.

This is the only album he released while he was incarcerated in the Louisiana State Penitentiary. It was supported with a music video for the song "Better Not Fight", which was released on August 17, 2010.

== Track listing ==
No.	Title	Writer(s)	Producer(s)	Length
1.	"Devils"	Torence Hatch; Christopher Leday	Savage	3:16
2.	"You Don't Know"	Hatch; Leday	BJ	4:17
3.	"Betrayed" (featuring Webbie)	Hatch; Webster Gradney; Bruce Rome	BJ	4:52
4.	"Chill Out"	Hatch; Rome	BJ	4:22
5.	"Bank Roll (Part 2)" (featuring Webbie and Big Head)	Hatch; Gradney; Deshawn Johnson; Rome	BJ	4:14
6.	"How We Do It" (featuring Webbie and Lil Trill)	Hatch; Gradney; Marcus Bennett; Rome	BJ	4:57
7.	"Cartoon" (featuring Shell and Mouse)	Hatch; Shelton Martin; Jeremy Allen	Mouse	4:47
8.	"Thugged Out" (featuring Foxx)	Hatch; Jonathan Reed; Rome; Marlon Clark	BJ; DJ B Real	4:36
9.	"Better Not Fight" (featuring Foxx, Webbie and Lil Trill)	Hatch; Reed; Bennett	Supa Dave West	4:24
10.	"What I Learned from the Streets" (featuring Shell)	Hatch; Martin; Rome; Reed	BJ	4:18
11.	"Calling Me"	Hatch; Rome	BJ	3:48
12.	"Do It Again" (featuring Lil' Phat and K.T.)	Hatch; Melvin Vernell III; Rome	BJ	4:39
13.	"Long Journey" (featuring Webbie)	Hatch; Gradney	BJ	3:37
14.	"The Rain" (featuring Lil Trill)	Hatch; Bennett; Rome	BJ	4:49
Total length:				1:00:56

Deluxe version bonus tracks
No.	Title	Writer(s)	Producer(s)	Length
15.	"Showin Up"	Hatch; Bennett; Quorey Speights	Q Red	4:05
16.	"We Gon Miss You"	Hatch		3:54

== Charts ==
Chart (2010)	Peak position
US Billboard 200	13
US Top R&B/Hip-Hop Albums (Billboard)	6
US Top Rap Albums (Billboard)	4
