= Youngest of da Camp =

Studio album by Lil Boosie
- Released: 2000
- Recorded: 1999
- Genres: Gangsta rap; southern hip hop
- Length: 53:00
- Label: C-Loc Records
- Producers: Happy Perez; Russell Lee; C-Loc

Lil Boosie chronology
C-Loc Present Camp III: Thug Brothas (2000)	Youngest of da Camp (2000)	For My Thugz (2002)

Youngest of da Camp is the debut studio album by American rapper Lil Boosie. It was released in 2000, by C-Loc Records. The album's production was mainly handled by Happy Perez, Russell Lee and C-Loc himself. C-Loc was also listed as one of the album's featured guest appearances, along with Max Minelli, Concentration Camp and Donkey. Youngest of da Camp has sold 10,000 units in the United States.

== Background ==
Lil Boosie's cousin Young Dee introduced Boosie to Baton Rouge rapper C-Loc in the late 1990s. He was mentored by Young Bleed and C-Loc and joined Concentration Camp, a rap group from Baton Rouge formed by C-Loc in the mid nineties, as the youngest member in 1998. During the recording of this album, Lil Boosie was 17 years old. Most of the album's production was handled by C-Loc and Happy Perez.

== Artwork ==
The album's artwork was designed by Pen and Pixel Graphics. The company's design art compares with other major Louisiana record labels; including Cash Money Records and No Limit Records, which those album art that they also created at the time.

== Track listing ==
No.	Title	Producer(s)	Length
1.	"Shout Out"	Russell Lee	1:52
2.	"Feel Lucky" (featuring Max Minelli)	C-Loc	3:42
3.	"It's Goin Down"	Happy Perez	3:36
4.	"Pop It On Me" (featuring Max Minelli)	C-Loc	4:11
5.	"That Night"	C-Loc	3:54
6.	"I Thought Ya Knew"	C-Loc	3:50
7.	"It Don't Matta" (featuring Concentration Camp)	C-Loc	3:51
8.	"Boosie II (Don't Forget It)"	Happy Perez	3:18
9.	"Same Ol Shit" (featuring Max Minelli)	Happy Perez	3:37
10.	"Watch Em'" (featuring Max Minelli & C-Loc)	C-Loc	3:12
11.	"Young Niggaz" (featuring Donkey)	C-Loc	3:24
12.	"My Life"	C-Loc	3:44
13.	"I Got Dat Slap" (featuring Max Minelli)	Russell Lee	4:22
14.	"Boosie II (Radio)"	Happy Perez	3:10
15.	"Pop It (Radio)"	C-Loc	3:51
