= Ghetto Stories (film) =

2010 film directed by John McDougall

- Directed by: John McDougal; Turk
- Written by: Adam Moreno; Damon Dash
- Produced by: Courtney Scott; Bryan Wright
- Starring: Lil Boosie; Webbie; Bun B Trill Fam; Nicole Alexander; Tyrin Turner
- Cinematography: Larry Lynutte; Turk
- Edited by: Phillip Kimsey
- Music by: Mouse On Tha Track; B.J. Tha New Orleans Runna; DJ B-Real
- Distributed by: Trill Films; Asylum Records
- Release date: November 9, 2010
- Running time: 110 minutes
- Country: United States
- Language: English
- Budget: $500,000

Ghetto Stories is a 2010 American crime film directed by John McDougal and Turk produced and distributed by Asylum Records. It was released on November 9, 2010.

== Plot ==
Rival drug dealers struggle to make ends meet in the crime filled streets of Baton Rouge. Unaware that they are family, two young men from different sides of town wage a war on each other that eventually culminates in a strong union.

== Cast ==
- Lil Boosie - Marcus Hatch
- Webbie - Jy Carter
- Tyrin Turner - Slimm
- Nicole "Hoopz" Alexander - Kayla
- Bun B - Savages' father
- Paul Wall - Prison Inmate
- Lil' Trill - Trill
- Mike Epps - Lawn Service Worker
- La'rico Hill - Humana Humana
- Brandon Bradford - BiBi
- Lil Phat
- Linda Robinson - Grandmother

== See also ==
- List of hood films
