= Better Believe It =

Single by Lil Boosie featuring Young Jeezy & Webbie

from the album Superbad: The Return of Boosie Bad Azz
- Released: July 10, 2009
- Length: 5:20
- Label: Trill Entertainment, Bad Azz Entertainment, Asylum Records, Warner Bros. Records
- Songwriters: Jeremy Varnard Allen, Webbie, Torrence Hatch, Jay Jenkins, Walter Williams
- Producer: Mouse On Tha Track

Lil Boosie singles chronology
"Out Here Grindin" (2008)	"Better Believe It" (2009)	"Show da World" (2014)

Webbie singles chronology
"I Miss You" (2008)	"Better Believe It" (2009)	"Show Da World" (2014)

Young Jeezy singles chronology
"Fed Up" (2009)	"Better Believe It" (2009)	"I'm Goin' In" (2009)

"Better Believe It" is a song by the American rapper Lil Boosie which was the lead single from his second studio album Superbad: The Return of Boosie Bad Azz. It was released on July 10, 2009. It features additional verses from Young Jeezy and label-mate Webbie.

== Chart positions ==
Chart (2009)	Peak Position
U.S. Billboard Hot 100	99
U.S. Billboard Hot R&B/Hip-Hop Singles & Tracks	40
U.S. Billboard Hot Rap Tracks	23
