= Foxx (rapper) =

American rapper

- Also known as: Foxx A Milliyone; Mr. Wipe Down
- Born: Jonathan Reed; June 6, 1984 (age 42); Baton Rouge, Louisiana, U.S.
- Genres: Hip hop
- Occupations: Rapper; songwriter
- Years active: 2007–present
- Labels: Milliyone; Str8 Up; Trill; Atlantic Records (current); Asylum; Warner Bros. (former)
- Website: trillent.com/foxx.html

Jonathan Reed (born June 6, 1984), better known by his stage name Foxx, is an American rapper. His debut album, Street Gossip, was released in 2007.

== Discography ==
=== Studio albums ===
List of albums, with selected chart positions
Title	Album details	Peak chart positions			Sales
Title	Album details	US	US R&B	US Rap	Sales
Street Gossip	Released: September 18, 2007; Label: Trill, Asylum; Format: CD, digital download	144	21	12	US: 56,309
Street Gossip 2	Released: TBA; Label: Trill, Str8 Up, Milliyone, Atlantic; Format: CD, digital download	TBR	TBR	TBR	

=== Collaboration albums ===
List of albums, with selected chart positions
Title	Album details	Peak chart positions		
Title	Album details	US	US R&B	US Rap
Trill Entertainment Presents: Survival of the Fittest (with Trill Entertainment)	Released: May 15, 2007; Label: Trill, Asylum; Format: CD, digital download	17	3	2
Trill Entertainment Presents: All or Nothing (with Trill Entertainment)	Released: November 9, 2010; Label: Trill, Asylum; Format: CD, digital download	49	8	5
Trill Entertainment Presents: Trill Fam - Respect Is a Must (with Trill Entertainment)	Released: June 24, 2016; Label: Trill, Atlantic; Format: CD, digital download	—	—	—
Trillumanati (with Lil Trill & Shell)	Released: TBA 2014; Label: Trill; Format: CD, digital download	—	—	—
"—" denotes a recording that did not chart.

=== Mixtapes ===
Foxx's mixtapes and details
Title	Mixtape details
Street Gossip: The Mixtape	Released: May 24, 2007; Presented by Trill Entertainment
My Haters Love Me Most	Released: October 3, 2009; Presented by Trill Entertainment
Tuff Love Vol. 1	Released: August 31, 2009; Presented by Trill Entertainment
Hide Ya Beats	Released: August 11, 2010
I Am Trill Fam	Released: July 19, 2011; Presented by Str8 Jacket Entertainment & Trill Entertainment
I'm Carolyn Son	Released: February 25, 2011
Hide Ya Beatz 2	Released: July 27, 2011
Hemi Hemi Gone	Released: September 28, 2011; Presented by Milliyone Musik & Trill Entertainment
I'm Better Than Blessed	Released: November 21, 2011; Presented by Milliyone Musik & Trill Entertainment
Don't Work Don't Eat	Released: April 5, 2012; Presented by Milliyone Musik & Trill Entertainment
Mayweather	Released: June 9, 2012; Presented by Milliyone Musik, Str8 Up & Trill Entertainment
Cold Blooded (with Milliyone Musik Mafia)	Released: February 25, 2013; Presented by Milliyone Musik, Str8 Up & Trill Entertainment
Shake Back	Released: November 4, 2013; Presented by Milliyone Musik, Str8 Up & Trill Entertainment
Jail Made Me Worse	Released: March 13, 2015; Presented by Milliyone Musik, Str8 Up & Trill Entertainment

=== Singles ===
- "Wipe Me Down" (with Lil Boosie & Webbie)
- "Not Myself"
- "She Said" (featuring Trey Songz)
- "Bounce" (featuring T-Pain)
- "Coogi Down"

=== Guest appearances ===
- "U Got Cake" Webbie feat. Big Head & Foxx off Trill Entertainment's debut compilation album Trill Entertainment Presents: Survival of the Fittest
- "Bout Dat" Webbie feat. Foxx off Trill Entertainment's debut compilation album Trill Entertainment Presents: Survival of the Fittest
- "Leave the Tags On" Big Head feat. Lil Boosie & Foxx off Trill Entertainment's debut compilation album Trill Entertainment Presents: Survival of the Fittest
- "Got Me Bent" Webbie featuring Lil Boosie & Foxx off Trill Entertainment's debut compilation album Trill Entertainment Presents: Survival of the Fittest
- "Adios" Foxx, Lil Boosie, Big Head & Webbie off Trill Entertainment's debut compilation album Trill Entertainment Presents: Survival of the Fittest
- "Fly as an Eagle" Webbie feat. Foxx & Pimp C off Webbie's second album Savage Life 2
- "Loose as a Goose" Lil Boosie feat. Foxx and Mouse off Lil Boosie's third album Superbad: The Return of Boosie Bad Azz
- "Better Believe It Remix" Lil Boosie feat. Yo Gotti, Trae, Bun B & Foxx
- "Devils" Lil Boosie feat. Foxx off Lil Boosie's third album Incarcerated
- "Thugged Out" Lil Boosie feat. Foxx off Lil Boosie's third album Incarcerated
- "Better Not Fight" Lil Boosie feat. Webbie, Lil Trill & Foxx off Lil Boosie's third album Incarcerated

== Filmography ==
Films

- Ghetto Stories: The Movie (2010)
- Don't Work, Don't Eat (2012)
