= Out Here Grindin =

2008 single by DJ Khaled

Single by DJ Khaled featuring Akon, Rick Ross, Young Jeezy, Lil Boosie, Trick Daddy, Ace Hood and Plies

from the album We Global
- Released: June 24, 2008
- Genre: Gangsta rap; hardcore hip-hop
- Length: 3:57 (album/video version); 4:21 (single version)
- Label: We the Best; Terror Squad; Koch
- Songwriters: Faheem Najm; Khaled Khaled; Aliuane Thiam; William Roberts; Jay Jenkins; Torrence Hatch; Maurice Young; Antoine McColister; Algernod Washington
- Producers: The Runners; Akon

DJ Khaled singles chronology
| "Foolish (Remix)" (2008) | "Out Here Grindin" (2008) | "Go Hard" (2008) |

Akon singles chronology
| "That's Right" (2008) | "Out Here Grindin" (2008) | "Wake It Up" (2008) |

Rick Ross singles chronology
| "Foolish (Remix)" (2008) | "Out Here Grindin" (2008) | "You're Everything" (2008) |

Lil Boosie singles chronology
| "Independent" (2007) | "Out Here Grindin" (2008) | "Better Believe It" (2009) |

Trick Daddy singles chronology
| "Tuck Ya Ice" (2007) | "Out Here Grindin" (2008) | "Wine and Dine" (2008) |

Ace Hood singles chronology
| "Cash Flow" (2008) | "Out Here Grindin" (2008) | "Ride" (2008) |

Plies singles chronology
| "Ain't Sayin' Nothin'" (2008) | "Out Here Grindin" (2008) | "Please Excuse My Hands" (2008) |

"Out Here Grindin" is the first single from DJ Khaled's third studio album, We Global. The track features American hip hop artists Akon, Rick Ross, Young Jeezy, Lil Boosie, Trick Daddy, Ace Hood, Plies and Lil Wayne. It was produced by The Runners and co-produced by Akon, with the hook written by T-Pain.

== Background ==
This song originally featured Lil Wayne in place of Young Jeezy. The version with Young Jeezy in place of Wayne is the official single version. Plies' verse has been moved to Wayne's part. The version with Jeezy's verse was released on Jeezy's mixtape "The Prime Minister". The reason for Wayne's verse being removed is allegedly because of him not being able to attend the music video shoot.

== Versions ==
The song has three versions.

- Out Here Grindin (Original Version)
  (DJ Khaled featuring Akon, Rick Ross, Plies, Lil Boosie, Trick Daddy, Ace Hood and Lil Wayne)
- Out Here Grindin (Single Version)
  (DJ Khaled featuring Akon, Rick Ross, Young Jeezy, Lil Boosie, Trick Daddy, Ace Hood and Plies)
- Out Here Grindin (Video & Album Version)
  (DJ Khaled featuring Akon, Rick Ross, Plies, Lil Boosie, Ace Hood and Trick Daddy)

A fourth version, available on the Lil Wayne and Friends 4 mixtape, removes Plies' verse and instead features both Jeezy and Wayne's parts. It is credited as Lil Wayne feat. Young Jeezy.

== Music video ==
A music video was filmed in 2008 and features all the guest artists working with green screens. Cameos were made by Tyga, Lil' Phat, Bun B, Young Dro, Fat Joe, Red Café, Brisco, Lil Mama, Flo Rida, Busta Rhymes, Maino, Young Jeezy, Kardinal Offishall, Royce da 5'9", Sean Kingston, and T-Pain. The video premiered on MTV2's Sucker Free on July 22, 2008. The video does not include Young Jeezy or Lil' Wayne, but they are still kept on the official single. The video version has Akon, Rick Ross, Plies, Lil Boosie, Ace Hood and Trick Daddy, and is the version that ended up being on the album.

== Chart performance ==
"Out Here Grindin" first made a "Hot Shot Debut" at number 38 on the US Billboard Hot 100 chart for the issue of July 19, 2008 making it DJ Khaled's highest debut on the chart at the time. On January 13, 2009, the single was certified gold by the Recording Industry Association of America (RIAA) for sales of over 500,000 copies.

Also, in Canada it debuted at number 71 on the Canadian Hot 100 based on downloads.

== Charts ==
| Chart (2008) | Peak position |
|---|---|
| Canada Hot 100 (Billboard) | 71 |
| US Billboard Hot 100 | 38 |
| US Hot R&B/Hip-Hop Songs (Billboard) | 32 |
| US Hot Rap Songs (Billboard) | 17 |
| US Pop 100 (Billboard) | 65 |

== Certifications ==
| Region | Certification | Certified units/sales |
|---|---|---|
| Canada (Music Canada) | Gold | 20,000^{*} |
| United States (RIAA) | Gold | 500,000^{^} |
^{*} Sales figures based on certification alone.^{^} Shipments figures based on certification alone.
