= Wipe Me Down =

Single by Foxx featuring Lil Boosie and Webbie

from the album Trill Entertainment Presents: Survival of the Fittest
- Released: January 2007
- Recorded: 2006
- Genre: Hip-hop
- Length: 4:34
- Songwriters: Jeremy Varnard Allen; Webster Gradney Jr; Torrence Hatch; Jonathan Reed
- Producer: Mouse on tha Track

Lil Boosie singles chronology
"Zoom" (2006)	"Wipe Me Down" (2007)	"Independent" (2007)

"Wipe Me Down" is a song by American rapper Foxx, included as a song on the Trill Entertainment compilation album Trill Entertainment Presents: Survival of the Fittest (2007). The song's backing track was composed by American record producer Mouse On Tha Track. A remixed version, featuring additional vocals from fellow rappers Lil Boosie and Webbie, was released as a single in 2007, with Lil Boosie listed as the lead artist. There is another remixed version featuring UGK, in which Foxx has different vocals than the other remix version along with vocals from Pimp C & Bun B.

== Charts ==
=== Weekly charts ===
Chart (2007)	Peak position
US Billboard Hot 100	38
US Hot R&B/Hip-Hop Songs (Billboard)	8
US Hot Rap Songs (Billboard)	4
US Pop 100 (Billboard)	56

=== Year-end charts ===
Chart (2007)	Position
US Hot R&B/Hip-Hop Songs (Billboard)	24

== Release history ==
Country	Date	Format	Label
United States	March 27, 2007	Rhythmic contemporary radio	Trill Entertainment, Asylum, Atlantic
