= Gangsta Musik =

Studio album by Lil Boosie and Webbie
- Released: May 25, 2004
- Genre: Hip hop; gangsta rap
- Length: 69:48
- Label: Warner Bros. Records, Trill Entertainment
- Producer: Mouse, Lil Q, Happy Perez, and T&M Tracks

Lil Boosie & Webbie chronology
| Ghetto Stories (2003) | Gangsta Musik (2004) |

Lil Boosie chronology
| Ghetto Stories (2003) | Gangsta Musik (2004) | Bad Azz (2006) |

Webbie chronology
| Ghetto Stories (2003) | Gangsta Musik (2004) | Savage Life (2005) |

Gangsta Musik is the second collaboration album from the duo Lil Boosie and Webbie. The album had well-known hits such as "Swerve" (which would be later used on the film Hustle & Flow) and "Give Me That" (featuring Bun B). The album sold 320,000 overall in the U.S.

== Track listing ==
| # | Title | Producer(s) |
|---|---|---|
| 1 | "Show Ya Tattoos" (feat. Bun B) | Happy Perez |
| 2 | "Swerve" | Mouse |
| 3 | "Give Me That" (feat. Bun B) | Mouse |
| 4 | "U Ain't Bout What U Be Talkin Bout" | Lil Q |
| 5 | "Bad Bitch" | Mouse |
| 6 | "Goin' Thru Some Thangs" | Mouse |
| 7 | "Hustlin'" | Mouse |
| 8 | "Gangsta Musik" | Mouse |
| 9 | "Dance Wit' You" | T&M Tracks |
| 10 | "Baby Momma" | Mouse |
| 11 | "Fucked Up" | Lil Q |
| 12 | "Hope I Make It " | Lil Q |
| 13 | "Time Could Be Next" | Lil Q |
| 14 | "Get on Ya Shit" | Lil Q |
| 15 | "Trouble Man" | Mouse |
| 16 | "Hold Up" (feat. Bun B) | Mouse |

== Charts ==
| Charts | Peak position |
|---|---|
| US Billboard Top R&B/Hip-Hop Albums | 35 |
| US Billboard Top Heatseekers | 11 |
