= Give Me That (song) =

Single by Webbie featuring Bun B

from the album Savage Life
- Released: May 19, 2005
- Genre: Southern hip-hop
- Length: 4:27
- Label: Trill; Asylum
- Songwriters: Webster Gradney; Bernard James Freeman; Jeremy Varnard Allen; Calvin Broadus; Pharrell Williams; Charles Edward Hugo
- Producer: Mouse

Webbie singles chronology
| "Give Me That" (2005) | "Bad Bitch" (2005) |

Bun B singles chronology
| "I'sa Playa" (2005) | "Give Me That" (2005) | "Draped Up" (2005) |

"Give Me That" is a song performed by American rappers Webbie and Bun B from the former's 2004 collaborative album with Lil' Boosie, Gangsta Musik. It was released on May 19, 2005 through Trill Entertainment with distribution via Asylum Records as the lead single from Webbie's debut studio solo album Savage Life. Produced by MouseOnDaTrack, it contains elements of Snoop Dogg's "Beautiful".

The single peaked at number 29 on the Billboard Hot 100, number 8 on the Hot R&B/Hip-Hop Songs, number 4 on the Hot Rap Songs and number 11 on the Rhythmic charts in the United States. It has been certified gold by the Recording Industry Association of America on June 14, 2006 for the sales of 500,000 units.

== Track listing ==
| No. | Title | Length |
|---|---|---|
| 1. | "Give Me That" (Clean) |
| 2. | "Give Me That" (Dirty) |

== Charts ==
=== Weekly charts ===
| Chart (2005) | Peak position |
|---|---|
| US Billboard Hot 100 | 29 |
| US Hot R&B/Hip-Hop Songs (Billboard) | 8 |
| US Hot Rap Songs (Billboard) | 4 |
| US Rhythmic Airplay (Billboard) | 11 |

=== Year-end charts ===
| Chart (2005) | Position |
|---|---|
| US Billboard Hot 100 | 100 |
| US Hot R&B/Hip-Hop Songs (Billboard) | 33 |

== Certifications ==
| Region | Certification | Certified units/sales |
|---|---|---|
| United States (RIAA) | Gold | 500,000^{^} |
^{^} Shipments figures based on certification alone.
