= Savage Life =

Studio album by Webbie
- Released: July 5, 2005
- Recorded: 2003–2005
- Genre: Southern hip hop
- Length: 70:26
- Label: Trill; Asylum
- Producer: Turk & Mel (exec.); Mouse on the Track; Mannie Fresh; Steve Below; DJ B-Real; Juicy J; DJ Paul

Webbie chronology
Gangsta Musik (2004)	Savage Life (2005)	Savage Life 2 (2008)

Singles from Savage Life
- 1. "Give Me That" Released: January 22, 2005; 2. "Bad Bitch (Remix)" Released: April 6, 2005; 3. "How U Ridin'" Released: June 10, 2005

Professional ratings
Review scores
Source	Rating
AllMusic	3/5 stars
HipHopDX	3.5/5 stars
RapReviews	(4/10)
Rolling Stone	3/5 stars

Savage Life is the debut studio album by American rapper Webbie. It was released on July 5, 2005, by Trill Entertainment and Asylum Records. The album's lead single, "Give Me That" became a certified as gold by the Recording Industry Association of America (RIAA) in the United States. The album debuted at number eight on the US Billboard 200, with 68,000 copies sold in its first week.

== Track listing ==
all tracks produced by Mouse on the Track except whats noted

No.	Title	Producer(s)	Length
1.	"G-Shit"		3:16
2.	"How U Ridin'"		4:08
3.	"Like That"		4:02
4.	"Full of That Shit" (featuring Lil Boosie)		3:12
5.	"Give Me That" (featuring Bun B)	DJ B-Real	4:27
6.	"Crank It Up"		4:00
7.	"Laid Way Back"	Steve Below	4:19
8.	"Gutta Bitch"		4:03
9.	"I Got That" (featuring Lil Boosie)	Juicy J; DJ Paul	4:00
10.	"What Is It?"	Mannie Fresh	4:26
11.	"Back Up" (featuring Lil Boosie)		4:25
12.	"Bad Bitch"		4:11
13.	"Mind Ya Business" (featuring Big Head)		4:02
14.	"Come Here Bitch" (featuring Mannie Fresh)	Mannie Fresh	4:07
15.	"Retarded"		3:56
16.	"Gotta Show Me You Worth It" (featuring B.G.)		4:05
17.	"U Don't Want That" (featuring Big Head and Lil Boosie)		4:13
18.	"Bad Bitch (Remix)" (featuring Trina)		4:03

== Charts ==
=== Weekly charts ===
Chart (2005)	Peak position
US Billboard 200	8
US Top R&B/Hip-Hop Albums (Billboard)	4

=== Year-end charts ===
Chart (2005)	Position
US Top R&B/Hip-Hop Albums (Billboard)	73
