= Ghetto Stories (Lil Boosie and Webbie album) =

Studio album by Lil Boosie and Webbie
- Released: July 22, 2003
- Genre: Hip hop; gangsta rap
- Length: 74:10
- Label: Trill Entertainment

Lil Boosie & Webbie chronology
Ghetto Stories (2003)	Gangsta Musik (2004)

Lil Boosie chronology
For My Thugz (2002)	Ghetto Stories (2003)	Gangsta Musik (2003)

Webbie chronology
Ghetto Stories (2003)	Gangsta Musik (2003)

Ghetto Stories is the first collaboration album from the duo Lil Boosie and Webbie. “Ghetto Stories” sold well over 15,000 copies. The album sold 120,000 overall in the U.S.

== Track listing ==
1. "Like A Bird (Lil Boosie & Webbie)"
2. "Finger Fuckin' (Lil Boosie & Webbie feat. Pimp C of U.G.K.)"
3. "Do It Big (Lil Boosie & Webbie)"
4. "Had A Dream (Lil Boosie & Webbie)"
5. "Dont Know Why (Webbie)"
6. "Pussy Ass Nigga (Lil Boosie)"
7. "Play Hard (Pimp C of U.G.K.)"
8. "Money Cars (Webbie)"
9. "Ghetto Stories (Lil Boosie & Webbie)"
10. "Gangsta (Lil Boosie & Webbie)"
11. "I Need U (Lil Boosie)"
12. "Girl Go Head (Lil Boosie & Webbie feat. Lil Q & Big Head)"
13. "Animosity (Lil Boosie)"
14. "Happen To Ya (Lil Boosie & Webbie)"
15. "Porch (Webbie)"
16. "Keep It Gutta (Lil Boosie)"
17. "Shit Trill (Webbie)"
18. "In My Pocket (Lil Boosie feat. U.G.K.)"
