= Savage Life 2 =

Studio album by Webbie
- Released: February 26, 2008
- Recorded: 2007
- Genres: Southern hip hop, gangsta rap
- Length: 65:14
- Labels: Trill, Asylum, Atlantic
- Producers: Mouse On Tha Track, Mannie Fresh, BJ, DJ B-Real

Webbie chronology
Savage Life (2005)	Savage Life 2 (2008)	Savage Life 3 (2011)

Singles from Savage Life 2
- 1. "Independent" Released: November 20, 2007; 2. "I Miss You" Released: March 10, 2008

Professional ratings
Review scores
Source	Rating
AllMusic	3.5/5 stars
DJBooth	3.5/5 stars
HipHopDX	2.5/5 stars
Pitchfork Media	(5.8/10)
RapReviews	(6.5/10)

Savage Life 2 is the second studio album by American rapper Webbie. The album was released on February 26, 2008, by Trill Entertainment, Asylum Records, and Atlantic Records. The album debuted at number four on the US Billboard 200 with 72,000 copies sold in its first week. The first single was "Independent," featuring Lil Boosie and Lil Phat and peaked at number 9 on the Hot 100. The second single was "I Miss You" featuring LeToya Luckett. The album also features guest appearances by Rick Ross, Bun B and the whole Trill Entertainment roster.

== Track listing ==
No.	Title	Length
1.	"2 Smooth"	4:07
2.	"Six 12's" (featuring Mouse)	4:01
3.	"Independent" (featuring Lil Boosie & Lil Phat)	4:10
4.	"I Know" (featuring Young Dro)	4:54
5.	"Just Like Me"	3:39
6.	"Thuggin'" (featuring Lil Boosie, Lil Phat & Shell)	4:16
7.	"I'm Hot"	4:32
8.	"You a Trip" (featuring Big Head)	5:02
9.	"Just Like This" (featuring Big Head)	5:02
10.	"A Miracle" (featuring Birdman & Rick Ross)	4:30
11.	"I'm Ready"	4:17
12.	"I Miss You" (featuring LeToya Luckett)	3:45
13.	"Doe Doe" (featuring Bun B & Lil Phat)	5:16
14.	"Fly as an Eagle" (featuring Pimp C & Foxx)	4:12
15.	"Ya'll Ain't Makin' No Money"	4:12
16.	"First Night" (featuring Mouse)	4:28

== Charts ==
=== Weekly charts ===
Chart (2008)	Peak position
US Billboard 200	4
US Top R&B/Hip-Hop Albums (Billboard)	3

=== Year-end charts ===
Chart (2008)	Position
US Top R&B/Hip-Hop Albums (Billboard)	41
