= Boosie Badazz =

American rapper (born 1982)

Boosie BadAzz
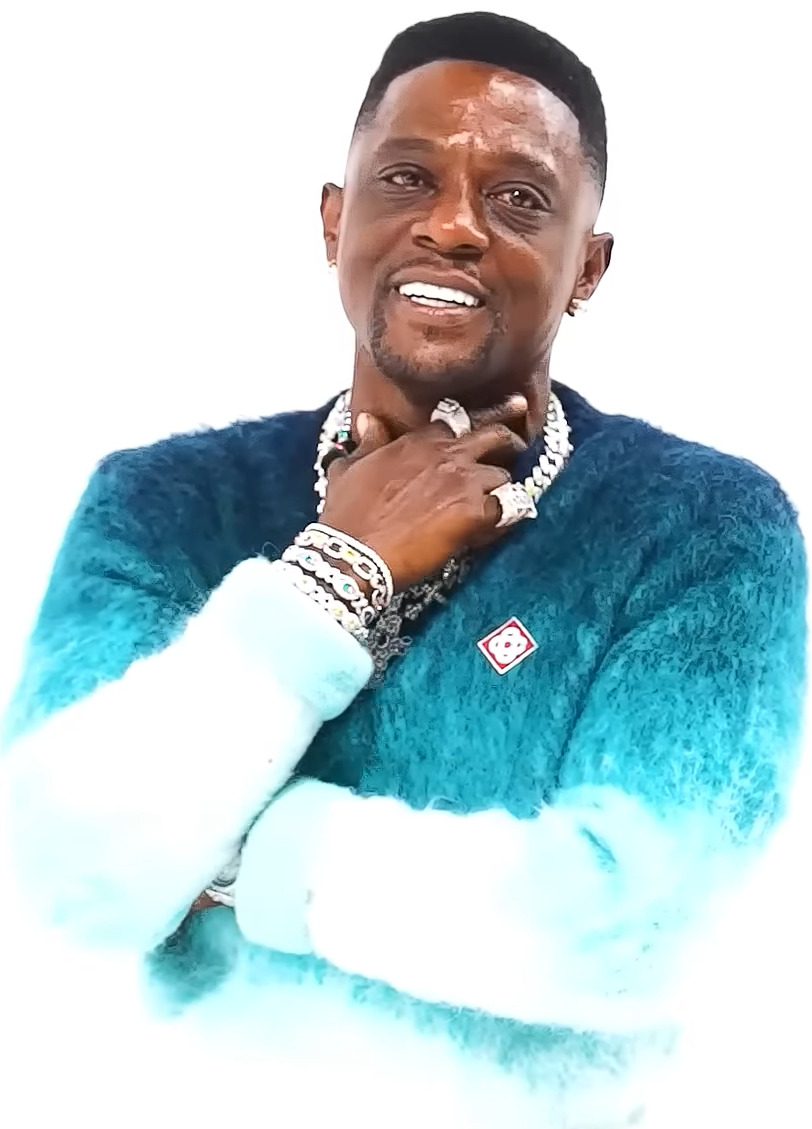
- Boosie Badazz in 2024

Background information
- Also known as: Lil' Boosie; Bad Azz; Mr. 126
- Born: Torrence Ivy Hatch Jr. November 14, 1982 (age 44); Baton Rouge, Louisiana, U.S.
- Genres: Southern hip hop; gangsta rap; trap
- Occupations: Rapper; songwriter; actor
- Children: 8
- Years active: 1998–present
- Labels: Trill; Bad Azz Music Syndicate; Atlantic
- Formerly of: Concentration Camp
- Website: trillent.com

Torence Ivy Hatch Jr. (born November 14, 1982), better known by his stage name Boosie BadAzz or simply Boosie (formerly Lil' Boosie), is an American rapper. Hatch began rapping in the 1990s as a member of the Southern hip hop collective Concentration Camp, eventually pursuing a solo career in 2000 with the release of his debut album Youngest of da Camp. After leaving the label the following year, he signed with Pimp C's Trill Entertainment to release his second studio album, For My Thugz (2002). One of the most prominent figures of Southern hip hop, Hatch has gone on to release thirteen solo studio albums, as well as seven collaborative albums and 44 mixtapes.

In 2009, Hatch was sentenced to four years in prison on drug and gun charges. In 2010, he was indicted on first-degree murder, and was also sentenced to 10 years on multiple charges of drug possession with intent of distribution. In 2012, he was found not guilty of murder. After serving 5 years in prison for drug charges, Hatch was released early on March 5, 2014.

== Early life ==
Boosie was born Torrence Hatch on November 14, 1982, in Baton Rouge, Louisiana, and grew up on West Garfield Street. His mother, Connie Hatch (née Givens), was a school principal whose father was a pastor. His father, Torence Hatch Sr., died in 1997. He was diagnosed with type 1 diabetes as a child.

== Career ==
=== Early career ===
Lil Boosie's cousin Young Dee introduced Boosie to Baton Rouge rapper C-Loc in the late 1990s. He was mentored by Young Bleed and C-Loc as well as MD. and joined Concentration Camp, a rap group from Baton Rouge formed by C-Loc in the mid nineties, as the youngest member in 1998. The group consisted of Young Bleed, C-Loc, Happy Perez, Boo, Max Minelli, J-Von, Lee Tyme and Lucky Knuckles. He eventually debuted on C-Loc's fifth album, 'It's A Gamble' in 2000 under his old alias Boosie and Concentration Camp third studio album Camp III : Thug Brothas in 2000.

The departure of Young Bleed from the Camp helped put Lil Boosie in a prime position amongst the group. Alongside C-Loc and Max Minelli, he served as one of the "faces" of the Camp. At 17 years of age, he recorded his debut album, the aptly-titled Youngest of da Camp, (Camp Life Entertainment, 2000). The album production was mostly handled by Happy Perez, and featured C-Loc, Max Minelli and Donkey.

In 2001 he joined Trill Entertainment backed by its CEO the late Pimp C of UGK. Soon after, Trill independently released the album For My Thugz under his new alias Lil Boosie in 2002. The album featured Pimp C, Young Bleed, Webbie while he also put out his first mixtape title Boosie 2002 (Advance) featuring contributions by Max Minelli and Pimp C.

=== 2003–2005: Ghetto Stories, Gangsta Muzik and Warner Bros. ===
Later in the summer of 2003, Boosie collaborated with Webbie on the album Ghetto Stories, presented by Pimp C. In 2004, the duo worked together again on Trill Azz Mixtape Vol. 1, which also featured an appearance of Torrence "Bad Azz". In the same year, he released Trill Azz Mixes II which introduced Phat, later known as Lil Phat. He paired up again with Webbie, to release their second compilation album, Gangsta Musik. He caught the eye of some Universal Music Group representatives.

In 2004 Lil Boosie and South Coast Coalition released Both Sides of the Track. Boosie also released a compilation mixtape title Bad Ass with a few new tracks like Trill Shit. It also featured the track I Smoke, I Drank by Body Head Bangerz featuring Boosie and Young Bleed off their debut album Body Head Bangerz: Volume One. January 1, 2005, Boosie teamed up with Lava House Records to release United We Stand, Divided We Fall. He also released Street Code with Pat Lowrenzo. In 2005, Lil Boosie released Bad Ass (Advance) to promote Bad Azz.

In late January 2005, Boosie signed a deal with Warner Bros. Records.

=== 2006–2008: Bad Azz and Survival of the Fittest ===
In early 2006, Trill released Bad Ass Mixtape Vol.1 as a follow-up to (Bad Ass Advance). In 2006, Boosie's major label debut album Bad Azz was released. It contained the single "Zoom" featuring Yung Joc. A Bad Azz DVD followed where the rapper explained the death of his father due to drugs and his fight against diabetes. In early December 2006, the mixtape "Streetz Iz Mine" was released by Lil Boosie and DJ Drama (Gangsta Grillz), featuring a guest appearance by Webbie.

In 2007, Lil Boosie released Bad Azz Mixtapes Vol. 2 while together with Webbie he featured on the remix of "Wipe Me Down" by rapper Foxx. It was put on the Trill Entertainment compilation album Survival of the Fittest, which was released in 2007. In 2008 Boosie released Da Beginning Mixtape. At Lil Boosie's Fourth of July Bash party, he passed out his new mixtape, 4th Of July Bash. In December 2008, Lil Boosie released Lil Boosie Presents: Da Click, which features Da Click (Hatch Boy, Locco, Quick and Bleek). In 2008, he was featured on the single "Independent" by Webbie and was among several rappers to be featured on "Out Here Grindin" by DJ Khaled.

=== 2009: Superbad: The Return of Boosie Bad Azz and Bad Azz Entertainment ===
In March 2009 Boosie released The Return Of Mr. Wipe Me Down as a promotion mixtape to his second major album. The Runners and V-12 produced some of the mixtape. Lil Boosie again passed out an untitled mixtape at his July of 4th Bash. Songs from the tape eventually ended up on Da Click: Street Kingz which was released July 14. In 2009, Lil Boosie released his second major album Superbad: The Return of Boosie Bad Azz. The first single from the album, "Better Believe It", featured Webbie and Young Jeezy. Promotional music videos for songs from the album, such as "I'm a Dog" and "Loose as a Goose," were released.

Also in 2009, Lil Boosie presented his debut label Bad Azz Entertainment. Lil Boosie released Thug Passion on his Bad Azz Entertainment label in 2009. In the summer (July) of 2009, Lil Boosie and Hurricane Chris released a mixtape titled Category 7: Bad Azz Hurricane. Lil Boosie also released a mixtape titled Untouchables with LoLa Monroe. Lil Boosie also released a mixtape titled The 25th Hour. On an interlude on the mixtape, he speaks on his prison term.

=== 2010–2012: Incarcerated ===
In 2010 Lil Boosie and C-Loc, his former CEO, released Unbreakable as a Compilation CD. In 2010, Lil Boosie announced in prison, facing charges of murder and conspiracy, that he wanted to move forward with his career. Boosie released his fourth studio album, Incarcerated, on September 28 on Asylum Records. According to MTV News, the project is almost entirely produced by B.J., although Mouse on Tha Track did some work on it as well. Webbie, Foxx and Lil Trill are among the featured guests.

Lil Boosie released Gone Til' December in 2010, which is a mixtape album consisting of new music. The 25th Hour tape was originally released in his hometown of Baton Rouge, Louisiana – but other versions have spread around the internet. The version that he dropped featured songs like "Be Careful" featuring Money Bag$, "I Did You Wrong" feat. Lil Quick, "I Been Icy," "My Children," and "I Ain't Mad At Cha."

Other notable guest appearances include: Lil Jas, Hatch Boy, Yung Giga of Bad Azz Entertainment, as well as Lil Trill. There are some other mixtapes floating around the internet with similar titles, so Bad Azz Entertainment released it as Should've Been My Beatz on Amazon, Rhapsody and others. Lil Boosie released 22504 with B.G. In 2011 Quick release Hit After Hit 3 with Lil Boosie. In 2012 My Brother's Keeper was released with Money Bagz and Quick. Also Under Investigation was released as a free download on Livemixtapes with Ray Vicks.

=== 2014: Name change to "Boosie Badazz" ===
In January 2014 Lil Boosie spoke on his prison sentence and said,

I have about 500 songs at the moment. I feel that I'm making the best music I've ever made. The more I go through in life the better my music gets and it's been crazy the last three years. I keep my music heartfelt and stick to making real music. I wouldn't even say it's hip hop music. My music is 'reality rap'. Hip hop music can make you dance and bob your head, but it can't make you cry or touch your heart like reality rap.

On September 13, 2013, it was reported that judges related to his case agreed to return his hard drives and his computers. The equipment contained a lot of music he had recorded before going to jail. Jeff Weiss, who covered Boosie's trial for Rolling Stone, reported that Boosie's attorneys believed that he would be released within the next five months. On March 10, 2014, Boosie made his first comments to the public following his release from prison. During the press conference he revealed his new record deal with Atlantic Records. His first single released would be "Show Da World" with Webbie. Lil Boosie was feature on "Wuda Cuda Shuda" by 2 Chainz, "Beat Up the Block" by Dorrough Music, "Face Down" by DJ Mustard, "Beez Like" by Young Jeezy, "Jet Fuel" by T.I., "Made Me" (Remix) by Snootie Wild.

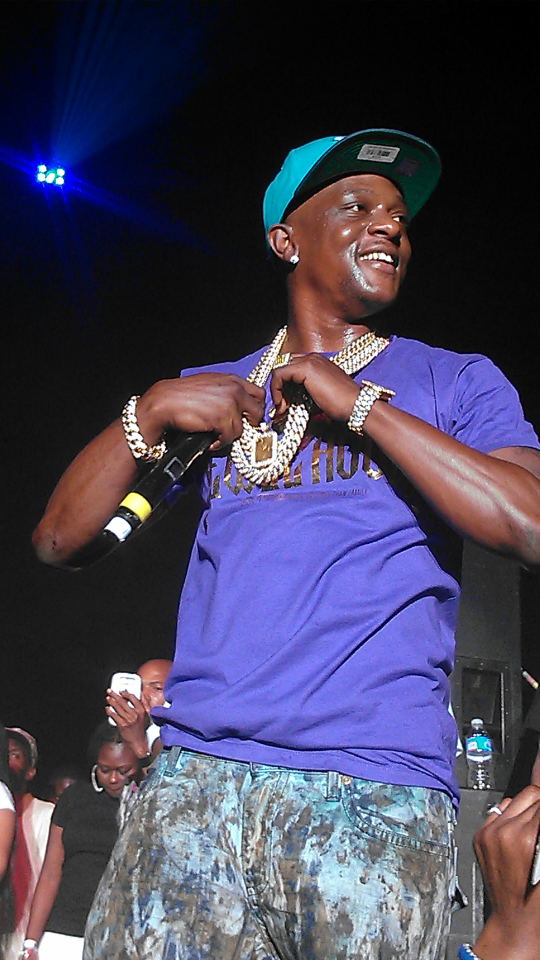
Boosie Badazz performing in 2014

In October 2014, Boosie changed his stage name to Boosie Badazz. and explained in a May 2015 interview with Noisey: "I got tired of just people, grown men, like "What up Lil Boosie?" No, I'm grown. It should be Mr.! You know, I'm Boosie Badazz. I'm a dad, man. Just take the shit off! That's how I was feeling ... Boosie Badazz is just like, more people say Badazz when they see me than Boosie, so I just stuck with the Boosie Badazz."

=== 2014–2015: Touchdown 2 Cause Hell and Life After Deathrow ===
In April 2014, Boosie announced that his sixth studio album Touchdown 2 Cause Hell would be released on July 15, 2014, but was later pushed back to September 23, 2014. The album would be delayed yet again, until he unveiled the track list and announced a May 26 release date on April 22, 2015. The project features 17 new tracks with guest appearances from Rich Homie Quan on the single "Like A Man," Webbie on the street single "On That Level," as well as Chris Brown, Rick Ross, T.I. and Keyshia Cole.

On October 30, 2014, Lil Boosie released his first mixtape since his release from prison titled "Life After Deathrow", featuring Yo Gotti, Trey Songz, LIV, Adtmurda whose name changed to Murdamann4real and Shy Glizzy. The project was largely conceptualized by Boosie's brother and manager Taquari "TQ" Hatch who serves as executive producer on the project. "Life After Deathrow" would feature songs like "I'm coming Home" and the hit "NO JUICE" produced by Mouse on Da Track.

=== 2016–present: Penitentiary Chances and BooPac ===
Boosie Badazz and C-Murder announced the Penitentiary Chances joint album on January 18, 2016, via AllHipHop. The project from the two Louisiana rappers was scheduled to be released April 15, 2016. All production is said to come from T-Rhythm and Moneybeats "SoundTrendsLlc". On December 15, 2017, Boosie Badazz released his seventh studio album BooPac.

=== 2018: Boosie Blues Cafe and Badazz 3.5 ===
On November 22, 2018, Boosie Badazz released Boosie Blues Cafe and on March 29, 2019, released Badazz 3.5.

== Bad Azz Music Syndicate ==
Bad Azz Music Syndicate is a record label founded by Boosie Badazz and Taquari "TQ" Hatch. While Incarcerated, TQ suggested rebranding Bad Azz Entertainment due to the many invalid artist and associates that began repping "Bad Azz Ent" unbeknownst to Boosie. TQ felt there would be a need to reestablish the brand as a music company that would be able to sign artist in the future who were more diverse and even international.

== Legal issues ==
On October 22, 2008, Boosie was arrested after East Baton Rouge sheriff's deputies found marijuana and a Glock in his car. Boosie pled guilty to his third-offense possession of marijuana charge on September 22, 2009, and was sentenced to two years in prison the next day. Judge Chip Moore doubled the sentence on November 9 after finding Boosie had violated probation while awaiting sentencing. Between his plea and sentencing, Boosie was electronically monitored and placed under house arrest.

On June 17, 2010, Boosie was indicted on charges of first-degree murder of Terry Boyd. He also faced charges for three counts of possession with intent to distribute narcotics (Schedule II: codeine and cocaine; Schedule I: marijuana), three counts of "conspiracy to commit possession with intent to distribute narcotics", and two counts of "conspiracy to introduce contraband into a penal institution". He has stated that he is innocent of these charges.

District Attorney Hillar Moore stated that the killing seemed to be "over turf". If convicted, Boosie could have faced the death penalty. Prosecutors also stated that they believed the rapper may have been involved in at least five other murders. On June 28, Boosie entered a not-guilty plea in a Louisiana court room. While Boosie's defense addressed the fact that the rapper has several ongoing cases, they emphasized that he is not a murderer and rested their case without bringing any witnesses. The jury in the case came to a unanimous not-guilty verdict on the murder charge after less than 10 minutes deliberation.

On November 29, 2011, Boosie was sentenced to eight years in state prison after pleading guilty to the drug charges. On May 11, 2012, a jury found Boosie not guilty of first degree murder.

On December 7, 2012, his attorneys were able to argue that the drug ring charge was a set up: the informant offered to provide codeine syrup for Boosie, an admitted codeine addict, in exchange for his help. He was released on March 5, 2014. He remained on parole until 2018.

On July 12, 2022, Boosie was detained during a traffic stop and cited with possession of marijuana.

Since May 2023, Boosie has had numerous arrests and charges in the San Diego area which have been related to unlawful firearm possession. On May 6, 2023, Boosie was arrested in San Diego after he was discovered to be a felon unlawfully in possession of a firearm after being pulled over by police for a traffic violation. On July 14, 2023, moments after one unlawful firearm possession charge against him was dismissed, Boosie was arrested on additional unlawful gun possession charges outside a San Diego courthouse. On July 21, 2023, a magistrate judge ordered for Boosie to be released on a $50,000 bond. On July 18, 2024, less than two weeks after the other charges were dismissed, Boosie was charged with counts of unlawful firearm possession, including one for interstate commerce as a convicted felon and another for knowingly possessing a firearm while using controlled substances. For the drug-related firearm possession law, Boosie faces up to 10 years in prison.

In 2025, Hatch paid far-right political operatives Jacob Wohl and Jack Burkman $600,000 to arrange for a pardon by president Donald Trump. He filed legal action against the two in July 2026 after failing to receive a pardon.

== Controversies ==
In February 2020, Boosie was criticized for comments he made towards Zaya Wade, 12-year-old daughter of American basketball player Dwyane Wade, who had recently come out as transgender, with the support of her parents, among them being "Don't cut his dick off, bruh." In the same video, he went on to say that outlawing physical abuse of children gave them too much power over their parents.

Also in February 2020, just days after the incident involving Zaya Wade, Boosie was asked by staff to leave a Planet Fitness in Georgia; Boosie alleged the gym's manager was hostile towards him for his comments towards Wade but a spokesperson for the company denied Boosie's claim that a personal grudge was the reason for him being asked to leave, instead stating that the rapper had failed to comply with company policies and had harassed members of the staff.

In May 2020, Boosie was criticized for a now-deleted video he uploaded to Instagram in which he spoke positively of paying an adult female prostitute to perform oral sex on his son and nephew, then 12 and 13 years old, below the age of consent in any U.S. state, and allowing his minor son to watch pornography, as he felt pornography was more appropriate for children to watch than "cartoons with two men kissing". Previously in 2017, in a birthday post aimed at his soon-to-be 14-year-old son, Boosie bragged that he had secured his son a "bad bitch" to perform fellatio on him for his birthday, in a post liked by 27,000 users, though he later claimed he had been joking.

After rumors spread that Lil Nas X was collaborating with Boosie, Boosie went on a homophobic rant against Lil Nas X, who is openly gay, in 2021, in which he urged Lil Nas X to commit suicide.

== Personal life ==
Boosie has eight children with six women. He has said that he did not believe marriage was a good choice for him, because he did not want to lose half of his fortune to his spouse in the event that he committed adultery, and has praised women who stay in a relationship with an unfaithful partner, saying he respects those women. In 2010, one of his ex-girlfriends, Walnita "Nita" Decuir, was arrested on charges related to drug distribution for attempting to smuggle illicit substances to Boosie, reportedly marijuana, codeine, and MDMA, who, at the time, was incarcerated.

On March 9, 2013, it was announced that Boosie had earned his GED certificate while incarcerated.

On November 25, 2015, at the age of 33, Boosie revealed he had been diagnosed with kidney cancer. He had successful surgery to remove the cancer.

Shortly after Bad Azz was released, Boosie revealed that he had type 1 diabetes, having been diagnosed in childhood. In April 2020, he took to Instagram to ask the public for help in locating insulin glargine, also known as Lantus, asking followers in the Jacksonville area to call him.

On September 20, 2022, Boosie released Cross The Tracks: A Memoir.

== Discography ==
Studio albums

- Youngest of da Camp (2000) (as Lil Boosie)
- For My Thugz (2002) (as Lil Boosie)
- Bad Azz (2006) (as Lil Boosie)
- Superbad: The Return of Boosie Bad Azz (2009) (as Lil Boosie)
- Incarcerated (2010) (as Lil Boosie)
- Life After Deathrow (2014)
- Touch Down 2 Cause Hell (2015)
- BooPac (2017)
- Boosie Blues Cafe (2018)
- Badazz 3.5 (2019)
- Bad Azz Zay (2019)
- Talk Dat Sh*t (2019)
- Goat Talk (2019)
- In House (2020)
- Goat Talk 3 (2021)
- Heartfelt (2022)
- Lines for Valentines (2023)

== Filmography ==
Films

- Gangsta Musik (2005)
- Bad Azz (2006)
- On the Grind (2006)
- Last Dayz (2009)
- Ghetto Stories: The Movie (2010)
- Glass Jaw (2018)
- My Struggle (2021)
