= Independent (song) =

Single by Webbie featuring Lil Boosie and Lil Phat

from the album Savage Life 2
- Released: November 20, 2007
- Recorded: 2007
- Genre: Southern Hip hop
- Label: Trill/Asylum
- Songwriters: Jeremy Varnard Allen, Webbie, Torrence Hatch, Melvin Vernell
- Producer: Mouse

Webbie singles chronology
"Wipe Me Down" (2007)	"Independent" (2007)	"I Miss You" (2008)

Lil Boosie singles chronology
"Wipe Me Down" (2007)	"Independent" (2007)	"Out Here Grindin" (2008)

"Independent"
Webbie featuring Lil Boosie & Lil Phat of 3 Deep's "Independent" from Savage Life 2

"Independent" is the first single by Webbie from his second album Savage Life 2. It features Lil Phat and Lil Boosie and a sample of Webbie's "Bad Bitch" in the chorus. Rapper Macklemore would later sample "Independent" on his #1 hit, "Can't Hold Us".

== Music video ==
The music video features Webbie performing in a room with three screens, each of which showcases a classroom filled with young women actively watching a news report covering a presidential press conference on the dire state of the war. As they watch the address, one student begins to visualize herself earning a degree, becoming a doctor, and winning the Nobel Prize. It culminates with the impeachment of the current president and her election as the first female president. After assuming her position, she proclaims her plans towards peace in the Middle East to the class' applause. The video closes with a screen that displays a dedication to Pimp C.

== Remix ==
A remix features Diamond & Princess of Crime Mob. Part 2 to the song features Lil' Boosie & Gorilla Zoe.

== Chart performance ==
On the issue dated December 8, 2007 the single debuted on the US Billboard Hot 100 at number 99. It later peaked at number nine, thus becoming a top 10 hit on the chart. "Independent" is the most successful song for all three artists. It was MTV Jams' first song of the week in 2008.

== Charts ==
=== Weekly charts ===
Chart (2007–2008)	Peak position
US Billboard Hot 100	9
US Hot R&B/Hip-Hop Songs (Billboard)	5
US Hot Rap Songs (Billboard)	1
US Pop Airplay (Billboard)	25
US Rhythmic Airplay (Billboard)	2

=== Year-end charts ===
Chart (2008)	position
US Billboard Hot 100	45
US Hot R&B/Hip-Hop Songs (Billboard)	19
US Rhythmic (Billboard)	14

== Release history ==
Release dates and formats for "Independent"
Region	Date	Format	Label(s)	Ref.
United States	March 3, 2008	Rhythmic contemporary	Atlantic	
