= Webbie =

American rapper (born 1985)

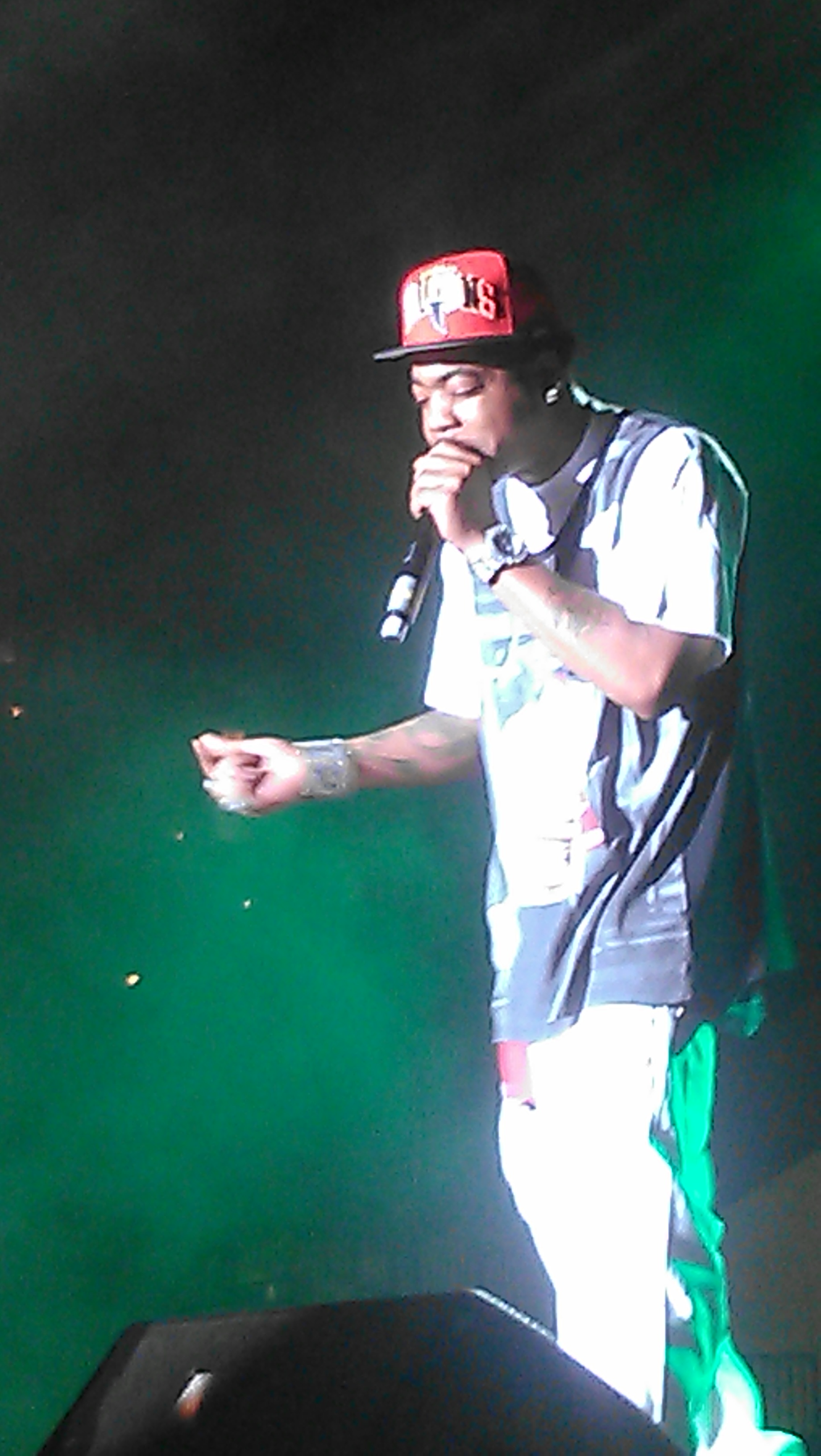
- Webbie performing in 2014

Background information
- Also known as: Young Savage; Sweet Jones Jr.; Savage Life
- Born: Webster Gradney Jr. September 6, 1985 (age 41); Baton Rouge, Louisiana, U.S.
- Genres: Hip hop; Southern hip hop
- Works: Discography
- Years active: 2000–present
- Labels: RBC; Fontana; Atlantic; Warner Bros.; Asylum; Trill

Webster Gradney Jr. (born September 6, 1985), known professionally as Webbie, is an American rapper. Gradney began his rap career in the early 2000s, first appearing on Lil Boosie's albums before releasing his debut album with him, Ghetto Stories.

He has been signed to the independent Trill Entertainment label since 2003. In 2005 he came into the hip hop scene with "Gimme That" featuring Bun B. His songs "Bad Bitch" and "Swerve" were featured on Gangsta Musik, his 2003 group album with Lil Boosie, and in the 2005 movie Hustle & Flow. Webbie's second album, Savage Life 2, was released in early 2008 with the hit single "Independent" featuring Lil Boosie and Lil Phat.

== Early life ==
Webbie was born on September 6, 1985, in Baton Rouge, Louisiana. His mother, Joycelyn Beauchamp, died when he was nine years old, and his parental care was split between his father, Webster Gradney Sr and his grandmother. He spent his childhood living in Glen Oaks, Baton Rouge.

== Music career ==
Webbie first appeared on Lil Boosie's album For My Thugz on the track "Gotta Get It" in 2001. He and Lil Boosie released Ghetto Stories in 2003 and Gangsta Musik in 2004. As Webbie's solo track "Give Me That" featuring Bun B was frequently featured in mixtapes, as a label Trill Entertainment was growing in popularity & was signed for a distribution deal at Asylum Records along with (Webbie). After he was signed there, his major-label debut Savage Life was released in 2005, debuting at number eight on the US Billboard 200 chart.

Trill began a deal to sign Webbie to the subsidiary label Atlantic Records & was successful. Singles from his next album, Savage Life 2, include "Independent" featuring Boosie and Lil Phat. As of 2020, it is Webbie's most successful song to date, peaking at number nine on the Billboard Hot 100 and reaching the top of the Rap Songs chart. Webbie released his third studio album Savage Life 3 on November 15, 2011, under Trill Ent. The first single from the album was "What's Happenin'". The album has currently sold over 50,000 copies.

Webbie's fourth album Savage Life 4 is the fourth in the Savage Life album series. The first single from the album "What I Do" was released on April 16, 2013. The album was released on November 19, 2013.

== Acting career ==
He has made an independent biographical movie, Ghetto Stories in October 2010, with Lil Boosie, based on their lives and lyrical themes. He also appeared in the 2011 film Video Girl, which featured actress Meagan Good.

== Controversies ==
On the October 14, 2011, episode of BET's 106 & Park, Webbie was banned from further appearances on the countdown show. Webbie appeared that day on the show as a guest judge for Freestyle Friday. The reason behind his ban was tied to allegations that he made sexually inappropriate comments to the show's hostess, Rocsi.

On September 13, 2012, Webbie was arrested in Baton Rouge on suspicion of robbery and battery. He was accused of kicking and pushing a woman down the stairs before stealing $340 from her purse.

== Discography ==
Studio albums

- Savage Life (2005)
- Savage Life 2 (2008)
- Savage Life 3 (2011)
- Savage Life 4 (2013)
- Savage Life 5 (2016)
- Savage Life 6 (2020)

Collaboration albums

- 2003: Ghetto Stories (with Lil Boosie)
- 2004: Gangsta Musik (with Lil Boosie)
- 2007: Trill Entertainment Presents: Survival of the Fittest (with Foxx, Lil Boosie and Trill Fam)
- 2010: Trill Entertainment Presents: All or Nothing (with Foxx, Lil Boosie and Trill Fam)
- 2016: Trill Entertainment Presents: Trill Fam – Respect Is a Must (with Trill Fam)
- 2025: Like Father Like Son (with Tre Savage)

== Filmography ==
Films

- Gangsta Musik (2005)
- On The Grind (2006)
- Ghetto Stories: The Movie (2010)
- Video Girl (2011)
- I Got the Hook up 2 (2019)
