= Slim Thug discography =

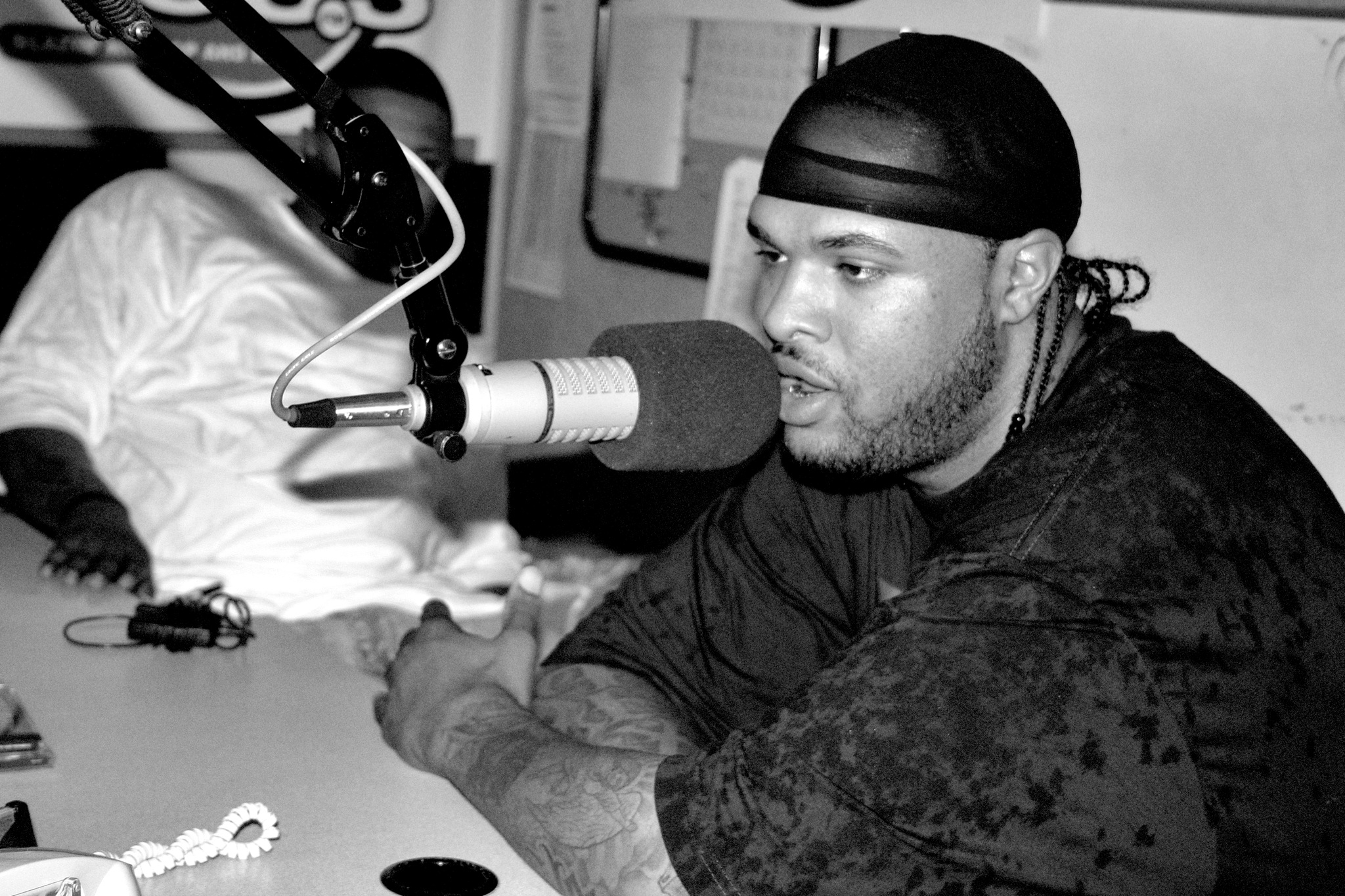
- Slim Thug at the KDHT studio in 2005
- Studio albums: 14
- Extended plays: 4
- Singles: 14
- Mixtapes: 20
- Promotional singles: 1
- Guest appearances: 100

This is the discography of Slim Thug, an American rapper from Houston, Texas.

== Albums ==
=== Studio albums ===
List of albums, with selected chart positions and certifications
Title	Album details	Peak chart positions			Certifications
Title	Album details	US	US R&B	US Rap	Certifications
Already Platinum	Released: July 12, 2005; Label: Boss Hogg Outlawz, Star Trak, Geffen; Format: CD, digital download	2	2	1	RIAA: Gold
Boss of All Bosses	Released: March 24, 2009; Label: Boss Hogg Outlawz, E1 Music; Format: CD, digital download	15	4	2	
Tha Thug Show	Released: November 30, 2010; Label: Boss Hogg Outlawz, E1 Music; Format: CD, digital download	89	17	7	
Boss Life	Released: November 19, 2013; Label: Hogg Life; Format: CD, digital download	—	28	18	
Hogg Life: The Beginning	Released: February 3, 2015; Label: Hogg Life; Format: CD, digital download	131	15	8	
Hogg Life, Vol. 2: Still Surviving	Released: July 10, 2015; Label: Hogg Life; Format: CD, digital download	—	17	10	
Hogg Life, Vol. 3: Hustler of the Year	Released: October 30, 2015; Label: Hogg Life; Format: CD, digital download	—	—	—	
Hogg Life, Vol. 4: American King	Released: August 5, 2016; Label: Hogg Life; Format: CD, digital download	179	15	9	
Welcome 2 Houston	Released: February 3, 2017; Label: Hogg Life; Format: CD, digital download	—	—	—	
The World Is Yours	Released: December 15, 2017; Label: Hogg Life; Format: CD, digital download	—	—	—	
Suga Daddy Slim: On tha Prowl	Released: February 14, 2019; Label: Hogg Life; Format: CD, digital download	—	—	—	
Thug Life	Released: March 27, 2020; Label: Hogg Life; Format: CD, digital download	—	—	—	
BIGslim	Released: January 14, 2022; Label: Hogg Life; Format: CD, digital download	—	—	—	
Midlife Crisis	Released: September 8, 2023; Label: Hogg Life; Format: CD, digital download	—	—	—	
Around the World	Released: June 7, 2024; Label: Hogg Life; Format: CD, digital download	—	—	—	
"—" denotes a recording that did not chart or was not released in that territory.

=== Collaborative albums ===
List of albums, with selected chart positions
Title	Album details	Peak chart positions		
Title	Album details	US	US R&B	US Rap
Boss Hogg Outlaws (with E.S.G.)	Released: November 6, 2001; Label: S.E.S., E1 Music; Formats: CD, digital download	—	55	—
The Big Unit (with Lil' Keke)	Released: July 8, 2003; Label: Rap-A-Lot; Format: CD, digital download	—	37	—
Boyz-n-Blue (with Boss Hogg Outlawz)	Released: April 20, 2004; Label: Boss Hogg Outlawz; Format: CD, digital download	—	78	—
Having Thangs (with Killa Kyleon)	Released: June 28, 2006; Label: Boss Hogg Outlawz; Format: CD, digital download	—	—	—
Serve & Collect (with Boss Hogg Outlawz)	Released: February 13, 2007; Label: Boss Hogg Outlawz, Koch; Format: CD, digital download	63	10	4
Back by Blockular Demand: Serve & Collect II (with Boss Hogg Outlawz)	Released: September 2, 2008; Label: Boss Hogg Outlawz, Koch; Format: CD, digital download	47	7	5
Serve & Collect III (with Boss Hogg Outlawz)	Released: August 30, 2011; Label: Boss Hogg Outlawz, E1 Music; Format: CD, digital download	—	37	23
Havin Thangs 2K17 (with Killa Kyleon)	Released: August 4, 2017; Label: Hogg Life, Team Run It, SoSouth; Format: CD, digital download	—	—	—
Down in Texas (with Killa Kyleon)	Released: July 24, 2020; Label: Hogg Life, Team Run It, SoSouth; Format: CD, digital download	—	—	—
Double Cup (with Propain)	Released: March 7, 2025; Label: Hogg Life, Forever Trill; Format: CD, digital download	—	—	—
Double Cup, Pt. 2 (with Lil' Keke)	Released: October 24, 2025; Label: Hogg Life, Slfmade 713, SoSouth; Format: CD, digital download	—	—	—
"—" denotes a recording that did not chart or was not released in that territory.

== Extended plays ==
Title	EP details
Welcome to Texas EP	Released: April 23, 2013; Label: Hogg Life; Format: Digital download
Big Bad Boston and the Boss (with Boston George)	Released: February 8, 2019; Label: Hogg Life, AMG; Format: Digital download
SDS Vibes	Released: April 23, 2021; Label: Hogg Life; Format: Digital download
Where Dreams Are Made	Released: February 15, 2023; Label: Hogg Life; Format: Digital download

== Mixtapes ==
Title	Mixtape details
I Represent This	Released: 2000; Label: Boss Hogg Outlawz; Format: Digital download
Tha Boss Vol. 1	Released: 2002; Label: Boss Hogg Outlawz; Format: Digital download
Underground Hoggin'	Released: 2002; Label: Boss Hogg Outlawz; Format: Digital download
Greatest Hits ('98-'03)	Released: 2003; Label: Boss Hogg Outlawz; Format: Digital download
From the House to the Streets Vol. 1	Released: 2005; Label: Boss Hogg Outlawz; Format: Digital download
Boss Basics	Released: 2005; Label: Boss Hogg Outlawz; Format: Digital download
From the House to the Streets Vol. 2	Released: 2006; Label: Boss Hogg Outlawz; Format: Digital download
Southern Smoke 15	Released: March 27, 2006; Label: Boss Hogg Outlawz; Format: Digital download
I Represent This Part 2	Released: March 3, 2009; Label: Boss Hogg Outlawz; Format: Digital download
Welcome 2 Texas: All Star 2010	Released: February 13, 2010; Label: Boss Hogg Outlawz, SoSouth; Format: Digital download
No Mixtape	Released: August 5, 2010; Label: Boss Hogg Outlawz, SoSouth; Format: Digital download
Welcome 2 Texas Vol. 2: Super Bowl XLV Edition	Released: February 6, 2011; Label: Boss Hogg Outlawz, SoSouth; Format: Digital download
Houston	Released: December 22, 2011; Label: Boss Hogg Outlawz, SoSouth; Format: Digital download
Thug Thursday	Released: August 31, 2012; Label: Boss Hogg Outlawz, SoSouth; Format: Digital download
Welcome 2 Texas Vol. 3 (with Paul Wall)	Released: February 16, 2013; Label: Boss Hogg Outlawz, SoSouth; Format: Digital download
Thug Thursday 2	Released: August 21, 2014; Label: Boss Hogg Outlawz, SoSouth; Format: Digital download
Thug Thursday 3	Released: July 14, 2016; Label: Boss Hogg Outlawz, SoSouth; Format: Digital download
King of the Nawf (Swishahouse Remix) (with Michael "5000" Watts)	Released: July 19, 2019; Label: Hogg Life, SoSouth; Format: Digital download
King of the Nawf	Released: July 26, 2019; Label: Hogg Life, SoSouth; Format: Digital download
For the City, Vol. 1	Released: August 2021; Label: Self-released; Format: Digital download
My First Day at Work	Released: January 23, 2025; Label: Self-released; Format: Digital download

== Singles ==
=== As lead artist ===
List of singles as a lead artist, with selected chart positions, showing year released and album name
Title	Year	Peak chart positions				Album
Title	Year	US Bub.	US R&B	US Rap	US Rhyth.	Album
"Getchya Hands Up" (with E.S.G.)	2001	—	80	—	—	Boss Hogg Outlaws
"Like a Boss"	2004	—	67	—	—	Already Platinum
"3 Kings" (featuring T.I. and Bun B)	2005	—	78	—	—	Already Platinum
"I Ain't Heard of That" (featuring Pharrell and Bun B)	2005	—	—	—	—	Already Platinum
"Diamonds" (Remix) (featuring Young Jeezy, Killa Kyleon and Slick Pulla)	2006	—	107	—	—	Already Platinum
"Incredible Feelin'" (featuring Jazze Pha)	2006	—	73	—	—	Already Platinum
"Wood Grain Wheel"	2007	—	70	—	—	Serve & Collect
"I Run" (featuring Yelawolf)	2008	9	49	20	30	Boss of All Bosses
"Thug"	2009	—	67	—	—	Boss of All Bosses
"Gangsta" (featuring Z-Ro)	2010	—	64	—	—	Tha Thug Show
"So High" (featuring B.o.B.)	2010	25	35	19	—	Tha Thug Show
"Summertime" (with Z-Ro)	2012	—	72	—	—	Non-album single
"Coming Down (Every Town)" (featuring Kirko Bangz, Big K.R.I.T. and Z-Ro)	2013	—	—	—	—	Boss Life
"Flex 4Eva" (featuring BeatKing and Boston George)	2013	—	—	—	—	Boss Life
"—" denotes a recording that did not chart.

=== As featured artist ===
List of singles as a featured artist, with selected chart positions and certifications, showing year released and album name
Title	Year	Peak chart positions										Certifications	Album
Title	Year	US	US R&B	US Rap	BEL (FL)	CAN	NLD	NOR	NZ	SWI	UK	Certifications	Album
"Chicken Fried Steak" (Tow Down featuring UGK, Slim Thug and Big Hawk)	2002	—	—	—	—	—	—	—	—	—	—		Chicken Fried Steak
"Still Tippin'" (Mike Jones featuring Slim Thug and Paul Wall)	2004	60	25	14	—	—	—	—	—	—	—	RIAA: Platinum	Who Is Mike Jones?
"Luxurious" (Gwen Stefani featuring Slim Thug)	2005	21	33	—	—	—	—	—	—	—	—		Love.Angel.Music.Baby
"Check on It" (Beyoncé featuring Slim Thug and Bun B)	2005	1	3	—	9	5	3	2	1	7	3	RIAA: Platinum; BPI: Silver; MC: 2× Platinum	#1's
"Wamp Wamp (What It Do)" (Clipse featuring Slim Thug)	2006	—	96	—	—	—	—	—	—	—	—		Hell Hath No Fury
"Tussle" (Big Tuck featuring Tum Tum and Slim Thug)	2006	—	—	—	—	—	—	—	—	—	—		Tha Absolute Truth
"The Main Event" (Chamillionaire featuring Paul Wall, Dorrough and Slim Thug)	2010	—	—	—	—	—	—	—	—	—	—		Non-album single
"First 48" (J-Dawg featuring Slim Thug)	2010	—	87	—	—	—	—	—	—	—	—		Still Behind Tint
"Errybody" (Remix) (DJ Michael "5000" Watts featuring Slim Thug, Sancho Saucy, Sauce Walka and 5th Ward JP)	2014	—	—	—	—	—	—	—	—	—	—		No Favors
"—" denotes a recording that did not chart or was not released in that territory.

=== Promotional singles ===
List of singles, with selected chart positions, showing year released and album name
Title	Year	Peak chart positions		Album
Title	Year	US	US R&B	Album
"Draped Up (Remix)" (Bun B featuring Lil' Keke, Slim Thug, Chamillionaire, Paul Wall, Mike Jones, Aztek, Lil' Flip, and Z-Ro)	2007	—	45	Trill

== Guest appearances ==
List of guest appearances, with other performing artists, showing year released and album name
Title	Year	Other performer(s)	Album
"Make That Money"	1999	Rapsta, E-Rock	Superstar of the Ghetto
"Braids & Fades"	1999	E.S.G.	Shinin' n' Grindin'
"Gripppin Grain"	2000	E.S.G., Deshawn Hill	City Under Siege
"Down South"	2000	Madd Hatta, Yungstar	Can I Live
"Headturner"	2000	Abstraq, Lil Mario	Grindology 101
"Mexicans And Blacks"	2000	Candyman	Makin' Deals of a Lifetime
"North 2 The South"	2000	Towdown	By Prescription Only
"The Legend"	2001	DJ Screw, Lucky, E.S.G., Lil' Baller	The Legend
"Leavin' All Crabs Below"	2001	Woss Ness	The Only Way To Beat Us Is Cheat Us
"We Ain't Broke No Mo"	2001	Lil' O, Big T	Da Fat Rat wit da Cheeze
"Shake Somethin"	2001	2 Phace	Hurricane Hustla'
"H-Town"	2001	G.I.N. of the Presidential Playas, E.S.G.	Straight Out da Bottle
"Murda Weapon"	2001	Mddl Fngz, E.S.G.	Live! from da Manjah
"Ride Fa Free"	2001	Cadillac	Dallas to Houston: I-45 Grindin'
"The Boss"	2002	Dirty South Rydaz, E.S.G.	T-Town Music Presents: DSR The Album
"Texas Boyz"	2002	Sam Huston Boyz, Big Pokey	Stay Real
"Chicken Fried Steak"	2002	Tow Down, Bun B, Big Hawk	Chicken Fried Steak
"Not a Stain on Me (Remix)"	2004	Big Tuck, Trae, Paul Wall, Fat Bastard	—N/a
"We Don't Play"	2004	E.S.G., Charlie Boy	Rhythm Trax & Gamelace Presents: Texas Game Spitterz Vol. 1
"Houston We Have a Problem"	2004	Cory Mo	Still Payn Duez
"Nolia Clap (Remix)"	2004	UTP, Z-Ro, Bun B, T.I.	Nolia Clap
"Luxurious (Remix)"	2004	Gwen Stefani	Love. Angel. Music. Baby.
"Still Tippin'"	2005	Mike Jones, Paul Wall	Who Is Mike Jones?
"Draped Up (H-Town Remix)"	2005	Bun B, Lil Keke, Chamillionaire, Paul Wall, Mike Jones, Aztek, Lil Flip, Z-Ro	Trill
"Check on It"	2005	Beyoncé, Bun B, Kelly Rowland	#1's
"They Don't Know"	2005	Paul Wall, Lil Keke, Big Hawk, Bun B, Trae	The Peoples Champ
"Shut It Down"	2005	Master P	Ghetto Bill
"Breakin' Old Habits"	2005	The Notorious B.I.G., T.I.	Duets: The Final Chapter
"It's Goin' Down (Remix)"	2006	Yung Joc, Rick Ross, Jody Breeze	—N/a
"Candy Paint"	2006	DJ Khaled, Chamillionaire, Trina	Listennn... the Album
"Working on Wheel"	2006	Pimp C	Pimpalation
"Hey Fella"	2006	Letoya Luckett	LeToya
"That Girl"	2006	Frankie J, Mannie Fresh	—N/a
"Keep It Playa"	2006	Pharrell	In My Mind
"U Don't See Me"	2006	Young Dro	Best Thang Smokin'
"Smokin' Smokin' Weed"	2006	Snoop Dogg, Nate Dogg, Ray J, Shorty Mack	—N/a
"Wamp Wamp (What It Do)"	2006	Clipse	Hell Hath No Fury
"It's Okay (One Blood) (Remix)"	2006	The Game, Jim Jones, Snoop Dogg, Nas, T.I., Fat Joe, Lil Wayne, N.O.R.E., Jadakiss, Styles P, Fabolous, Juelz Santana, Rick Ross, Twista, Kurupt, Daz Dillinger, WC, E-40, Bun B, Chamillionaire, Young Dro, Clipse, Ja Rule	The Dope Game 2
"Swang (Remix)"	2007	Trae, Big Pokey, Pimp C, Jim Jones, Mike Jones, Big Hawk, Paul Wall, Fat Phat	The Truth Show
"Riding on 4's"	2007	J-Dawg	Serve & Collect
"With Love (Play-n-Skillz Remix)"	2007	Hilary Duff	—N/a
"Let's Get It On"	2007	Big Hawk, Scooby, Paul Wall	Endangered Species
"Krispy (Remix)"	2007	Kia Shine, Swizz Beatz, Jim Jones, E-40, Young Buck, Remy Ma, LL Cool J	—N/a
"Take tha Hood Back"	2007	UGK, Vicious, Mddl Fngz	Underground Kingz
"I'm a Boss"	2007	Country Boi, Rick Ross	—N/a
"Nuthin' 2 a Boss"	2007	Trae	Life Goes On
"Won't Let You Down (Texas Takeover Remix)"	2007	Chamillionaire, Lil Keke, Mike Jones, Trae, Paul Wall, UGK, Z-Ro	—N/a
"Gettin' Money"	2007	DJ Drama, Paul Wall, Lil' Keke, Killa Kyleon	Gangsta Grillz: The Album
"Beat the Trunk Up"	2008	G.T., OG Ron C	Houston Ain't No Problem
"City of the Swag"	2008	Bun B, Mike Jones	II Trill
"Down South"	2008	C-Murder, C-Loc	Screamin' 4 Vengeance
"Boss Hogg on Candy"	2008	Big Pokey	Evacuation Notice
"U Can Hate"	2008	Big Pokey, Chris Ward	Evacuation Notice
"Johnny Dang's Watch Froze"	2008	Paul Wall, Fat Joe, Lil' Keke,	Fast Money (Album Before The Album)
"Call My Phone"	2008	Z-Ro	Crack
"Money in the City"	2008	Lil' Keke, Paul Wall, Tre Virdure	Loved by Few, Hated by Many
"Who Are They"	2008	Scarface, K-Rino	Emeritus
"Piece & Chain Swangin"	2009	Dorrough	Dorrough Music
"I'm Back"	2009	Mýa	Beauty & the Streets Vol. 1
"I da Pimp"	2009	Mike Epps, Too Short	Funny Bidness: Da Album
"H-Town of Mind"	2009	Killa Kyleon, Ashley Williams	—N/a
"Shining on Boyz"	2010	Jay'Ton, Trae tha Truth	Get It By The Ton
"The Main Event"	2010	Chamillionaire, Paul Wall, Dorrough	—N/a
"I'm So Bossy"	2010	Rawlt	CharmSchool
"Not My Friend"	2010	Expensive Taste	Heart of a Champion
"Ridin' Slow"	2010	Bun B, Play-N-Skillz	Trill OG
"First 48"	2010	J-Dawg	Still Behind the Tint
"Hoggz Nite Out"	2010	J-Dawg, MUG	Still Behind the Tint
"Midnight"	2010	Pimp C, Rick Ross	The Naked Soul of Sweet Jones
"Get at Me"	2010	Sentury	—N/a
"Handcuffs"	2010	Dorrough	Get Big
"Been About Bread"	2010	Big Boss E, Bun B	—N/a
"We Wrong"	2011	Marcus Manchild	—N/a
"Hottest In The City"	2011	Marcus Manchild, J-Dawg	Spaced Out
"Chunk a Stack"	2011	Gauge	Hustler on the Move
"Swanananana"	2011	Baby Bash, Stooie Bros	Bashtown
"That Candy Paint"	2011	E-40, Bun B	Revenue Retrievin': Graveyard Shift
"Feature"	2011	Marcellus Scott	—N/a
"Perfect 10"	2011	Cory Mo, GLC	The Fellowship Of The Ism (Mixtape)
"#Welcometothatrap"	2011	J Paul Jr.	Rebel IV Life
"None of Ya Bizzness"	2011	Lil' O, Wonderus	Grind Hard, Pray Harder
"Finer Thangs"	2011	Pimp C, Brooke Valentine	Still Pimping
"What U Workin Wit"	2011	Pimp C, Bun B	Still Pimping
"H-Town Kinda Day"	2011	Z-Ro	Meth
"New Shit"	2011	Chingo Bling	Masahouse
"Death Penalty"	2012	Game, Fabolous, Eric Bellinger	California Republic
"U Ain't Bout That Life"	2012	Waka Flocka Flame, Alley Boy	Triple F Life: Fans, Friends & Family
"Off White"	2012	Big Zak	Talk That Shit
"Cassette Deck"	2012	DJ Scream, Rick Ross, Bun B	Long Live The Hustle
"Buss It"	2012	Le$	—N/a
"Never Love Em"	2012	Le$	The Struggle Continues
"Rollin'"	2012	Game, Kanye West, Trae tha Truth, Z-Ro, Paul Wall	—N/a
"I Want"	2012	Trina, Dorrough	Back 2 Business
"Now & Then"	2012	Big K.R.I.T.	SPKSMEN Vol. 1
"Steak & Shrimp"	2013	Le$, Paul Wall	—N/a
"I Been On (Remix)"	2013	Beyoncé, Bun B, Z-Ro, Scarface, Willie D, Lil Keke	—N/a
"My City"	2013	Killa Kyleon, Kirko Bangz	Lean on Me: The Adventures of Joe Clark
"Cup Up Top Down"	2013	Kirko Bangz, Z-Ro, Paul Wall	Progression III
"Go Long"	2013	Nipsey Hussle, Z-Ro	Crenshaw
"Commin' Down"	2016	Mistah F.A.B., Paul Wall, Z-Ro, Bun B	Son of a Pimp Part 2
"KnoWhatImSayin"	2018	Bun B, Lil Keke	Return of the Trill
"Lamb Chops"	2020	Peso Peso	—N/a

== See also ==
- Boss Hogg Outlawz discography
