= Wood Grain Wheel =

Single by Slim Thug

from the album Boss of All Bosses and Serve & Collect
- Released: 2007
- Recorded: 2006–2007
- Genre: Southern hip hop
- Length: 4:15
- Label: Boss Hogg Outlawz; Geffen
- Songwriters: Leroy Williams; Stayve Thomas; Marcus Edwards
- Producer: Mr. Lee

Slim Thug singles chronology
"Incredible Feelin'" (2006)	"Wood Grain Wheel" (2007)	"Theme Song" (2007)

"Wood Grain Wheel" is a song by rapper Slim Thug. It was originally supposed to be the first single from his second album Boss of All Bosses, but the song failed to make the final cut. The song is produced by Houston producer Mr. Lee. Video cameo appearances were made by the whole Boss Hogg Outlawz and Lil Keke. A different version featuring PJ and Sir Daily appears as "Wood Wheel" on Serve & Collect.

The song peaked at number 70 on the Billboard Hot R&B/Hip-Hop Songs chart.

== Beat production ==
The beat is a simple production. In all, it includes three stabs in various pitches, pizzicato strings, repetitive hi-hats, open high hats, 808 claps, 808 bass drums, and a Lil' Keke sample "Aye I got to work my wood grain wheel// Trunk steady bumpin', grills steady commin'" which ties the track together.

The beat was actually reworked for official radio and internet play. Another sound was added to the main melody to give it a more "brass" kind of feel. Slim Thug is known for having brass instruments in his beats.

== Charts ==
Chart (2007)	Peak position
U.S. Billboard Hot R&B/Hip-Hop Songs	70
