= Serve & Collect =

Studio album by Boss Hogg Outlawz
- Released: February 27, 2007
- Recorded: 2006–2007
- Studio: Ari's Studios (Houston, TX); Hogg Pin Studios (Houston, TX)
- Genre: Southern hip-hop; gangsta rap
- Length: 1:03:07
- Label: Boss Hogg Outlawz; Koch
- Producer: Slim Thug (exec.); Rayface (exec.); Mr. Lee; Terry "T.A." Allen; GL Producions

Boss Hogg Outlawz chronology
Boyz-n-Blue (2004)	Serve & Collect (2007)	Back by Blockular Demand: Serve & Collect II (2008)

Professional ratings
Review scores
Source	Rating
AllMusic	3.5/5 stars
HipHopDX	2.5/5 stars

Serve & Collect is the second studio album by American hip-hop group Boss Hogg Outlawz. It was released on February 27, 2007, via Boss Hogg Outlawz/Koch Records.

The album found minor success on the Billboard charts, peaking at number 63 on the Billboard 200 and number 10 on the Top R&B/Hip-Hop Albums. The album's lead single "Wood Grain Wheel" was a minor hit on the R&B/Hip singles chart. The album was followed by two sequels, Back by Blockular Demand: Serve & Collect II in 2008 and Serve & Collect III in 2011.

== Track listing ==
No.	Title	Producer(s)	Length
1.	"We Boss Hoggin'"	Mr. Lee; Terry "T.A." Allen	3:55
2.	"Wood Wheel"	Mr. Lee	4:14
3.	"Recognize a Playa"	Mr. Lee	4:31
4.	"Ride on 4s"	Mr. Lee	4:06
5.	"Badge on My Neck"	Terry "T.A." Allen	4:01
6.	"Back to Front"	Mr. Lee	3:34
7.	"Straight Outta Texas"	Terry "T.A." Allen	4:04
8.	"Rollin"	Mr. Lee	4:17
9.	"This Is for My G.S."	Mr. Lee	3:35
10.	"I'm a Hogg"	Mr. Lee	4:39
11.	"It's That P.J."	Mr. Lee	4:27
12.	"Cheating"	Terry "T.A." Allen	4:02
13.	"I'm Fresh"	GL Producions	4:30
14.	"I Gotta Get It"	Mr. Lee	4:36
15.	"Heat on My Side"	Mr. Lee	4:36
Total length:			1:03:07

Best Buy Bonus Tracks
No.	Title	Length
16.	"I'm a G"
17.	"Side to Side"
18.	"Give It Up"

Sample credits

- "Recognize a Playa" contains elements from "Ace of Spade" by O.V. Wright

== Personnel ==
- Stayve Jerome Thomas – performer (tracks: 1–4, 6, 9–10, 12, 14, 17–18), executive producer
- Perthy Carson – performer (tracks: 2–3, 7, 9–11, 14–15, 18)
- Chris Ward – performer (tracks: 3, 8–9, 11, 14, 16, 18)
- Kyle Jeroderrick Riley – performer (tracks: 5–7, 15–17)
- T. Harris – performer (tracks: 2–3, 6, 16–17)
- Larry Wayne Jones Jr. – performer (tracks: 4, 7, 10, 15)
- S. Witfield – performer (tracks: 9, 13)
- Rob Smallz – performer (track 12)
- Leroy Williams Jr. – producer (tracks: 1–3, 6, 8–11, 14–15), mixing (tracks: 2–3, 8–11, 14–15)
- Terry Keith Allen – producer (tracks: 1, 5, 7, 12), mixing (tracks: 1, 5–7, 12)
- GL Productions – producer & mixing (track 13)
- Fly – mixing (track 4)
- Raymond Thomas – executive producer
- Mike Frost – artwork & design
- Fabian "Fabo" Martinez - Audio Engineer

== Chart history ==
Chart (2007)	Peak position
US Billboard 200	63
US Top R&B/Hip-Hop Albums (Billboard)	10
US Top Rap Albums (Billboard)	4
US Independent Albums (Billboard)	3
