= Tha Absolute Truth =

Studio album by Big Tuck
- Released: October 24, 2006
- Studio: Kitchen Studios (Dallas, TX); Maximedia Studio (Dallas, TX); The Hit Factory Criteria; Sound Explosion
- Genre: Southern hip hop
- Length: 1:10:20
- Label: DSR; T-Town; Universal
- Producer: Bigg Tyme; Cool & Dre; David "Boom" Pinks; Just Beatz; Mr. Lee; O'E Tha Thrilla; Play-N-Skillz; The Missing Element; Willie Boy

Professional ratings
Review scores
Source	Rating
RapReviews	7/10

Tha Absolute Truth is the debut solo studio album by American rapper Big Tuck. It was released on October 24, 2006, through DSR/T-Town Music and Universal Republic Records, making it the rapper's first and only major label album. Recording sessions took place at Kitchen Studios and Maximedia Studio in Dallas, The Hit Factory Criteria and Sound Explosion. Production was handled by Mr. Lee, The Missing Element, Willie Boy, Play-N-Skillz, Bigg Tyme, Cool & Dre, David "Boom" Pinks, Just Beatz and O'E Tha Thrilla, with Alan Powell, George Lopez and Trinidad Delgado serving as executive producers. It features guest appearances from Big Tite, Bun B, Chamillionaire, Dre, Erykah Badu, Paul Wall, Sleepy Lee, Slim Thug, and his Dirty South Rydaz group-mates Tum Tum, Addiction, Double T, Fat Bastard and Lil Ronnie.

The album did not reach the Billboard 200 chart, however, it debuted at 27 on the Top R&B/Hip-Hop Albums and number 14 on the Top Rap Albums in the United States.

== Track listing ==
No.	Title	Writer(s)	Producer(s)	Length
1.	"Monsta"	Cedric Leejuan Tuck; Josh Loudermilk	The Missing Element	3:46
2.	"Welcome to Dallas"	Tuck; Randy Jefferson	Bigg Tyme	4:59
3.	"In Da Hood" (featuring Fat B. and Tum Tum)	Tuck; G. Miller; Tony Richardson; Loudermilk	The Missing Element	4:03
4.	"We the Truth"	Tuck; W. Cleveland	Willie Boy	4:27
5.	"I Know U Want That" (featuring Chamillionaire and Tum Tum)	Tuck; Hakeem Seriki; Richardson; Juan Salinas; Oscar Salinas	Play-N-Skillz	4:12
6.	"That What's Up" (featuring Dre)	Tuck; Andre Lyon; Marcello Valenzano	Cool & Dre	3:51
7.	"Bottom Bitch" (featuring Sleepy Lee)	Tuck; M. Birdow; Leroy Williams	Mr. Lee	4:22
8.	"Texas Takeova" (featuring Bun B)	Tuck; Bernard Freeman; Williams	Mr. Lee	3:56
9.	"Tussle" (featuring Tum Tum and Slim Thug)	Tuck; Richardson; Stayve Thomas	Willie Boy	4:52
10.	"U Can't See Me" (featuring Double T. and Lil Ronnie)	Tuck; R. Atkins; T. Richards; L. Mills	O'E Tha Thrilla	4:05
11.	"Ain't No Mistaken (Danger Part II)" (featuring Erykah Badu)	Tuck; Erica Wright; Williams	Mr. Lee	5:14
12.	"Stop at the Light"	Tuck; F. Conchas; J. Conchas	Just Beatz	4:12
13.	"I'm a Ridah"	Tuck; Cleveland	Willie Boy	4:21
14.	"Dippin in Da Lac" (featuring Paul Wall)	Tuck; Paul Slayton	The Missing Element	5:14
15.	"Meet Me on the Floor" (featuring Addiction and Tite)	Tuck; R. Groce; David Pinks	David "Boom" Pinks	4:35
16.	"Rush"	Tuck; J. Salinas; O. Salinas	Play-N-Skillz	4:11
Total length:				1:10:20

== Personnel ==
- Cedric "Big" Tuck — vocals
- Tony "Tum Tum" Richardson — vocals (tracks: 3, 5, 9)
- G. "Fat Bastard" Miller — vocals (track 3)
- Hakeem "Chamillionaire" Seriki — vocals (track 5)
- Andre "Dre" Lyon — vocals & producer (track 6)
- M. "Sleepy Lee" Birdow — vocals (track 7)
- Bernard "Bun B" Freeman — vocals (track 8)
- Stayve "Slim Thug" Thomas — vocals (track 9)
- Double T. — vocals (track 10)
- Lil Ronnie — vocals (track 10)
- Erica "Erykah Badu" Wright — vocals (track 11)
- Paul "Paul Wall" Slayton — vocals (track 14)
- Addiction — vocals (track 15)
- Big Tite — vocals (track 15)
- Josh "The Missing Element" Loudermilk — producer (tracks: 1, 3, 14), recording (tracks: 1–4, 7, 8, 10–16)
- Randy "Bigg Tyme" Jefferson — producer (track 2)
- W. "Willie Boy" Cleveland — producer (tracks: 4, 9, 13)
- Juan Carlos Salinas — producer (tracks: 5, 16)
- Oscar Edward Salinas — producer (tracks: 5, 16)
- Marcello "Cool" Valenzano — producer (track 6)
- Leroy "Mr. Lee" Williams Jr. — producer (tracks: 7, 8, 11)
- O'E Tha Thrilla — producer (track 10)
- F. Conchas — producer (track 12)
- J. Conchas — producer (track 12)
- David "Boom" Pinks — producer (track 15)
- Hal Fitzgerald — recording & mixing (track 5)
- Robert "Big Brizz" Brisbane — recording (track 6)
- Mike E.D. — recording (track 10)
- Chris Godbey — mixing (tracks: 1, 2, 4, 6–8, 10–16)
- Chris Bell — mixing (track 3)
- John Painter — mixing (track 9)
- Chris Gehringer — mastering
- Alan Powell — executive producer
- George Lopez — executive producer
- Trinidad "Trini.D." Delgado — executive producer
- Mr. Scott Design — art direction
- Steven Cortez — artwork, photography
- Jonathan Mannion — photography
- Chris Graham — creative coordinator
- Meredeth Oliver — A&R
- Imran Majid — A&R
- Tom Mackay — A&R
- Angie Howard — product management
- Kim Garner — product management
- Liz Loblack — product management

== Charts ==
Chart (2006)	Peak position
US Top R&B/Hip-Hop Albums (Billboard)	27
US Top Rap Albums (Billboard)	14
