= Alan Powell (entrepreneur) =

American businessman specialising in multicultural branding

Alan Martell Powell
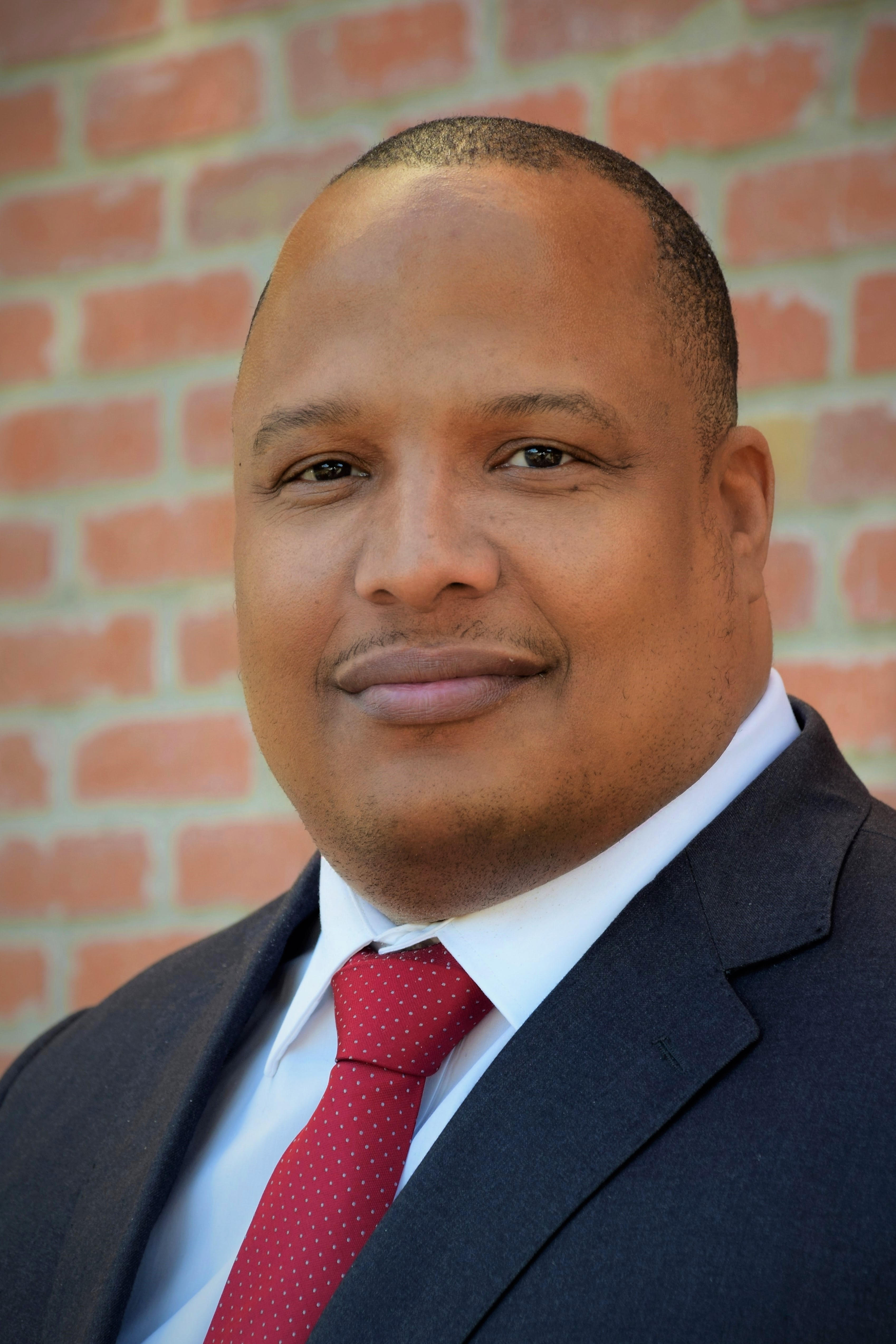
- Powell in 2017
- Born: December 26, 1967 (age 58); Louisville, Kentucky, United States
- Other names: AP Powell
- Occupations: Business executive, entrepreneur, consultant, and philanthropist
- Known for: Founder of branding and strategy firm AP & Associates and Checkered Flag Run Foundation

Alan "AP" Powell is an American entrepreneur, consultant and philanthropist. He is best known as founder, chairman and CEO of branding and strategy firm AP & Associates and as founder of the nonprofit HeroZona Foundation (formerly Checkered Flag Run Foundation).

== Early life ==
Powell was born December 26 in Louisville, Kentucky, the son of Alice Marion Johnson of Louisville, Kentucky and Tillman Powell of Winona, Mississippi. His mother, Alice, held master's degrees in speech and hearing pathology and behavioral therapy from Indiana University and Spalding University. His father, Tillman, owned Target Construction Company in Indianapolis, Indiana that helped build the Indiana State Museum and Historical Site. Powell has two sisters Allegra and Judy and one brother Darrell. His parents are deceased.

Powell graduated from Suda E. Butler Traditional High School in Louisville, Kentucky in 1986, attended College of Coastal Georgia for Physical Education and transferred to Missouri Valley College continuing on a basketball scholarship in pursuit of a bachelor's degree in sports administration. He enlisted for three years in the United States Army and served in the Gulf War under Operation Desert Storm.

== Career ==
After the Army, Powell started a career in the sports and entertainment industry as the Director of Player Personnel for Worldwide Sports and Entertainment in Newark, New Jersey (1992-1995), President of International Sports Entertainment Management in Louisville, Kentucky (1995-1997), and Vice President of Marketing at Management One in Cincinnati, Ohio (1997-2000). In 2000, Powell became Vice President of Development at The Firm, Inc., an entertainment management company in Beverly Hills, California.

While at The Firm, Powell started a career in the independent film and music industry as the co-executive producer for the movie soundtracks of Bullethead (2002) and Jacked Up (2002), was the Associate Producer of Jacked Up The Movie in 2001, and created major music collaborations including Reginald Arvizu (Fieldy) of Korn featuring E-40 and Fred Durst of Limp Bizkit featuring 8 Ball.

Powell inked a $7 million deal for Dallas hip hop group Dirty South Rydaz to record for Universal Music Group and then in 2005 became Co-CEO of T-Town Music/Universal Republic and served as executive producer of rap artist Big Tuck's album Tha Absolute Truth (2005) and Tum Tum - Eat Or Get Ate (2007).

Powell is Chairman and CEO of AP & Associates, LLC that he founded in 2004 in Louisville, Kentucky and relocated the headquarters to Phoenix, Arizona in 2008. Powell's consulting firm specializes in strategic alliances and channel development for Fortune 500 companies such as Diageo, AT&T, Coca-Cola, NASCAR and University of Phoenix. Powell was an owner at BuzzMouth (2009-2014), EventMob (2014–2019) and Purposely.com (2014–2019).

Powell served on University of Phoenix College of Security and Criminal Justice Advisory Board in Phoenix, Arizona (2015-2016), Managing Director of Paddington Brands, LLC in Carmel, Indiana (2011-2015), and Owner at Napa Smith Holdings in Napa, California (2011-2015).

== Community service ==
In 2011, Powell founded the Checkered Flag Run, a multi-cultural motorcycle rally, in conjunction with Phoenix International Raceway in Phoenix, Arizona.

The Checkered Flag Run Foundation was formed by Powell in 2011 to advance the quality of life and education for those living in under-served communities. Programs created by the Checkered Flag Run Foundation include My Brother's Keeper Community Challenge in Phoenix, The Bridge Forum, Veteran's Reach to Teach, Voting for Veterans, and HeroZona. In 2018, The Checkered Flag Run Foundation changed its name to HeroZona Foundation and has added to its offering Heropreneur Academy, a program that offers free entrepreneurial learning resources to U.S. Veterans, Active U.S. Service Members (including Reserves, National Guard) and Military Spouses.

Powell has been recognized for his community leadership and in giving back to the Phoenix community with Corporate Choice Award from Black Chamber of Arizona (2016), Dr. Martin Luther King Jr. Living the Dream Award (2017), Whitney M. Young Jr. Award from Greater Phoenix Urban League (2017), Edward M. Kennedy Community Service Award from American Association for Access, Equity and Diversity (2017), HeroZona Grand Marshall for the 21st Annual Phoenix Veterans Day Parade, ABC15 Salutes Arizona Veterans Award (2018), and Most Influential Man in the Valley (2019).

Powell served as an advisory board member for the City of Phoenix Aviation Advisory Board, Phoenix Military Veterans Commission, District 8 African-American Advisory Council, and American Legion Travis L. Williams Post 65 Executive Board Member. Powell was an advisory board member for 7th District Congressman Ruben Gallego's Veteran Advisory Council and Phoenix Theatre.
