= Back by Blockular Demand: Serve & Collect II =

Studio album by Boss Hogg Outlawz
- Released: September 2, 2008
- Recorded: 2007–2008
- Genre: Southern hip-hop; gangsta rap
- Length: 1:10:26
- Label: Boss Hogg Outlawz; Koch
- Producer: DSF; GL Productions; Mr. Lee; Terry "T.A." Allen

Boss Hogg Outlawz chronology
Serve & Collect (2007)	Back by Blockular Demand: Serve & Collect II (2008)	Serve & Collect III (2011)

Professional ratings
Review scores
Source	Rating
RapReviews	6.5/10

Back by Blockular Demand: Serve & Collect II is the third studio album by American hip-hop group Boss Hogg Outlawz. It was released on September 2, 2008, via Boss Hogg Outlawz/Koch Records. Production was handled by Mr. Lee, DSF, GL Productions and Terry "T.A." Allen. It features guest appearances from Lil' Keke and Ray J.

Serving as a sequel to 2007's Serve & Collect, Back by Blockular Demand became the group's most successful album chart-wise, peaking at number 47 on the Billboard 200, while also reaching the top 10 of R&B, rap and independent charts. This album was followed by Serve & Collect III, though founding members Chris Ward and Killa Kyleon had left the group and did not participate in the recording of the album.

== Track listing ==
No.	Title	Writer(s)	Producer(s)	Length
1.	"No Ceiling"	Stayve Thomas; Kyle Riley; Larry Jones; Chris Ward; Shannon Witfield; Perthy Carson	GL Productions	4:05
2.	"Like Me"	Thomas; Riley; Witfield	Mr. Lee	3:56
3.	"Lookin' Clean"	Thomas; Riley	Mr. Lee	4:12
4.	"Living Without"	Thomas; Ward; Riley	Mr. Lee	3:21
5.	"Time" (featuring Lil' Keke)	Jones; Marcus Edwards	Mr. Lee	4:22
6.	"Serve & Collect"	Carson; Ward; Riley; T. Harris; Jones; Witfield; Thomas	T.A.	4:39
7.	"Rap Reality Show"	Riley	Mr. Lee	4:13
8.	"Hood Superstar"	Witfield	DSF	3:02
9.	"Keep It Playa" (featuring Ray J)	Thomas; Riley; Carson	Mr. Lee	4:01
10.	"Give Me Some"	Carson; Ward; Thomas; Riley	Mr. Lee	4:19
11.	"Cost to Be"	Riley; Thomas; Ward	Mr. Lee	4:28
12.	"Keep It 1000"	Ward	Mr. Lee	4:11
13.	"Wet Paint Drippin'"	Carson	DSF	3:44
14.	"Fuck You Mean"	Thomas; Riley; Ward; Carson; Witfield	Mr. Lee	4:19
15.	"Man I'm a G"	Witfield; Carson; Jones	Mr. Lee	4:42
16.	"Lord I Know" / "It's Goin Down"	Witfield; Jones; Carson; Thomas	Mr. Lee; GL Productions	8:52
Total length:				1:10:26

== Personnel ==
- Stayve "Slim Thug" Thomas – performer (tracks: 1–4, 6, 9–11, 14–16), executive producer
- Kyle "Killa Kyleon" Riley – performer (tracks: 1–4, 6–7, 9–11, 14)
- Perthy "PJ" Carson – performer (tracks: 1–2, 6, 9–10, 13–16)
- Shannon "Young Black" Witfield – performer (tracks: 1, 3, 6, 8, 14–16)
- Chris Ward – performer (tracks: 1, 4, 10–12, 14)
- Larry Wayne "J-Dawg" Jones Jr. – performer (tracks: 1, 5–6, 15–16)
- T. "Sir Daily" Harris – performer (track 6)
- Marcus "Lil' Keke" Edwards – performer (track 5)
- William Raymond "Ray J" Norwood Jr. – performer (track 9)
- Leroy "Mr. Lee" Williams Jr. – producer & mixing (tracks: 2–5, 7, 9–12, 14–16)
- Gavin Luckett – producer (tracks: 1, 16)
- DSF – producer (tracks: 8, 13)
- Terry Keith Allen – producer (track 6)
- Sammy Huen – mixing (tracks: 1, 8, 13, 16)
- Raymond "Rayface" Thomas – executive producer
- Mike Frost – artwork & photography

== Charts ==
Chart (2008)	Peak position
US Billboard 200	47
US Top R&B/Hip-Hop Albums (Billboard)	7
US Top Rap Albums (Billboard)	5
US Independent Albums (Billboard)	3
