= Boss of All Bosses =

Studio album by Slim Thug
- Released: March 24, 2009
- Recorded: 2007–2009
- Genre: Hip hop
- Length: 57:03
- Label: Boss Hogg Outlawz; E1
- Producer: Mr. Lee; Jim Jonsin; Terry "T.A." Allen; Mannie Fresh; Mr. Rogers; Bigg Tyme; J. Moses; Hi-Tek; Cory Mo

Slim Thug chronology
Already Platinum (2005)	Boss of All Bosses (2009)	Tha Thug Show (2010)

Singles from Boss of All Bosses
- 1. "I Run" Released: November 11, 2008; 2. "Thug" Released: November 17, 2009

Boss of All Bosses is the second studio album by American rapper Slim Thug. It was released through his Boss Hogg Outlawz label with distribution via E1 Music on March 24, 2009. The album features guest appearances from Mannie Fresh, Z-Ro, Mike Jones, Scarface, and UGK, while the production on the album was primarily handled by Mr. Lee, along with several record producers, including Jim Jonsin, Mr. Rogers, and Bigg Tyme, among others.

Upon its release, the album was met with generally favorable reviews from music critics and publications. Boss of All Bosses debuted at number 15 on the US Billboard 200, selling 32,000 copies in its first week.

== Singles ==
The album's lead single, titled "I Run" was released on November 11, 2008. The song features guest vocals from American hip hop recording artist Yelawolf, with a production on the song being handled by Jim Jonsin. This song contains a sample of the chorus, of which was based on the song "I Ran (So Far Away)" performed by A Flock of Seagulls, but with different lyrics ("I run the streets all night and day").

The album's second single, "Thug" was released on November 17, 2009. The song was produced by Mr. Lee.

== Critical reception ==
Professional ratings
Review scores
Source	Rating
AllMusic	3.5/5 stars
Artistdirect	3/5 stars
DJBooth	3/5 stars
Houston Press	(favorable)
RapReviews	8.5/10 stars

Boss of All Bosses received a generally positive reception from music critics who saw it as an improvement over his major label debut Already Platinum. AllMusic's David Jeffries praised the album for being a return to Slim's early mixtape years, concluding that "this raw album is a welcome throwback that no longtime fan should be without." Pedro Hernandez of RapReviews praised the production for being a return to the Southern sound and Slim for expressing his voice through different topics throughout the whole album, saying that it "sounds like the triumphant introduction to Thug's unique brand of Texas rap rather than Thug trying to conform to the current trends." DJBooth gave a mixed review of the album, saying that some of the songs' lyrical material and production was given some flair but others felt by-the-numbers despite Slim's performance, concluding that, "All things considered, Slim Thug can still maintain his administrative position in the game despite this sophomore slump."

== Track listing ==
No.	Title	Producer(s)	Length
1.	"Boss of All Bosses"	Terry "T.A." Allen	3:16
2.	"I'm Back" (featuring Devin the Dude)	Mr. Lee	3:40
3.	"I Run" (featuring Yelawolf)	Jim Jonsin	3:55
4.	"Show Me Love" (featuring Mannie Fresh)	Mannie Fresh	3:53
5.	"Smile"	Jim Jonsin	3:12
6.	"Top Drop" (featuring Paul Wall)	Mr. Rogers	4:13
7.	"Thug"	Mr. Lee	3:50
8.	"Leanin'" (featuring UGK)	Mr. Lee	4:46
9.	"My Bitch"	Mr. Lee	4:00
10.	"Associates" (featuring Z-Ro and J-Dawg)	Bigg Tyme; J. Moses	4:33
11.	"Hard" (featuring Scarface and J-Dawg)	Mr. Lee	4:07
12.	"She Like That" (featuring Killa Kyleon)	Mr. Lee	4:41
13.	"Welcome 2 Houston" (featuring Chamillionaire, Paul Wall, Mike Jones, UGK, Lil' Keke, Z-Ro, Trae, Rob G, Lil' O, Big Pokey, Mike D, and Yung Redd)	Mr. Lee	8:57

iTunes Store bonus tracks
No.	Title	Producer(s)	Length
14.	"Perfect 10"	Cory Mo	3:16
15.	"Gotta Get It"	Hi-Tek	3:30

Leftover tracks

- "Wood Grain Wheel"
- "Theme Song (Hoggs On Da Grind)"
- "Problem Wit Dat"

Notes

- "Smile" features additional vocals by J. Lacy.

Sample credits

- "I Run" contains a sample of "I Ran (So Far Away)" performed by A Flock of Seagulls.
- "Top Drop" contains a sample of "Love Is What You Make It" performed by Masterpiece.
- "Thug" contains a sample of "Eazy-Duz-It" performed by Eazy-E.
- "My Bitch" contains a sample of "Faded Pictures" performed by Case and Joe.
- "Hard" contains a sample of "Hard Knocks" performed by Marc Broussard.

== Charts ==
=== Weekly charts ===
Chart (2009)	Peak position
US Billboard 200	15
US Top R&B/Hip-Hop Albums (Billboard)	4
US Independent Albums (Billboard)	1

=== Year-end charts ===
Chart (2009)	Position
US Top R&B/Hip-Hop Albums (Billboard)	72
