= 3 Kings (song) =

Single by Slim Thug featuring T.I. and Bun B

from the album Already Platinum
- Released: February 18, 2005
- Recorded: 2004
- Genre: Hip hop
- Length: 3:48
- Label: Boss Hogg Outlawz; Star Trak; Geffen
- Songwriters: Stayve Thomas; Leroy Williams; Bernard Freeman; Clifford Harris; Willie Clarke; Clarence Reid; Clinton Mansell; Sammie Norris; Cleavon Prince; Micah Troy
- Producer: Mr. Lee

Slim Thug singles chronology
"Still Tippin'" (2004)	"3 Kings" (2005)	"I Ain't Heard of That" (2005)

T.I. singles chronology
"U Don't Know Me" (2005)	"3 Kings" (2005)	"ASAP" (2005)

Bun B singles chronology
"Give Me That" (2005)	"3 Kings" (2005)	"They Don't Know" (2005)

"3 Kings" is a song by American rapper Slim Thug, released as the second single from his debut album Already Platinum (2005). The song was produced by Mr. Lee and features fellow rapper T.I. and UGK member Bun B. The song peaked at number 78 on the Billboard Hot R&B/Hip-Hop Songs chart. The song samples Betty Wright's song "Secretary".

== Charts ==
Chart (2004)	Peak position
US Hot R&B/Hip-Hop Songs (Billboard)	78
