= Already Platinum =

Studio album by Slim Thug
- Released: July 12, 2005
- Recorded: 2004–2005
- Genre: Hip hop; southern hip-hop
- Length: 62:26
- Label: Boss Hogg Outlawz; Star Trak; Geffen
- Producer: The Neptunes; Mr. Lee; Jazze Pha; Sha Money XL; Black Jeruz; Cool & Dre; T.A.; Mr. Rogers; Michael '5000' Watts

Slim Thug chronology
Already Platinum (2005)	Boss of All Bosses (2009)

Singles from Already Platinum
- 1. "Like a Boss" Released: November 9, 2004; 2. "3 Kings" Released: February 18, 2005; 3. "I Ain't Heard of That" Released: March 6, 2005; 4. "Diamonds (Remix)" Released: August 30, 2005; 5. "Incredible Feelin'" Released: January 17, 2006

Already Platinum is the debut studio album by American rapper Slim Thug. It was released through his label Boss Hogg Outlawz and the Neptunes's Star Trak Entertainment, an imprint of Geffen Records (part of the Interscope Geffen A&M corporate unit) on July 12, 2005. Its original release date was scheduled for February 2005, but heavy bootlegging and numerous delays held the album back, forcing a vast majority of its original track listing to be replaced. The original track listing included a version of the track "I Ain't Heard of That" which featured Jay-Z.

In an interview with XXL, the rapper explained the album title does not suggest he will go platinum, but that his lifestyle (before he got a record deal) was already similar to that of rappers who had reached the platinum status. In an interview on The Tyra Banks Show, mentor Pharrell revealed that he was a millionaire before the two met, and he especially liked that about him. He continued to say that he was "already platinum," the album name was just in confirmation of this.

The album debuted at number two on the US Billboard 200, with 130,000 copies sold in the first week. Ironically, the album has only sold 500,000 copies in the United States, signifying gold certification by the Recording Industry Association of America (RIAA).

== Background ==
In a 2016 interview with Slim Thug, he claims to have met the album's executive producer, Pharrell Williams, in Houston prior to career a mentorship arranged by Jimmy Iovine, as both acts were signed to the Interscope Geffen A&M Records umbrella at the time. Slim Thug also claims to have recorded a bulk of album in Los Angeles; Williams played him a then-unreleased remix to Jay-Z's 2003 single "Change Clothes"—one of Williams' productions—which was later reworked and became a song on the album, "I Ain't Heard of That". The song was also supposed to keep a verse performed by Jay-Z as a guest feature, however once the song became heavily bootlegged, the guest slot was replaced by fellow Houston rapper Bun B. Jay-Z received a formal songwriting credit on the song, although Slim Thug claims that Williams wrote the chorus.

== Critical reception ==
Professional ratings
Review scores
Source	Rating
AllMusic	4/5 stars
Robert Christgau	C
Entertainment Weekly	B
Okayplayer	3.5/5 stars
Pitchfork	7.5/10
Rolling Stone	3.5/5 stars
Spin	4/5 stars
Stylus Magazine	B+
USA Today	3/4 stars
Vibe	4/5 stars

Already Platinum garnered a positive reception from music critics who praised Slim's vocal delivery and the Southern production. AllMusic's Andy Kellman praised Slim's delivery for being more charismatic than Lil' Flip and Mike Jones, and the production work from both Mr. Lee and The Neptunes, concluding that "Already Platinum is one of 2005's best rap albums." Evan McGarvey of Stylus Magazine praised the Neptunes' production for evolving with Slim's Southern drawl and delivery, concluding that "After years of singles that people called "infectious" and "club-ready," they take Slim Thug and his dashing uniqueness and carve diamonds. This [album] isn't a musical highlight reel, it's watching artists shuck off personal curses and step into their own skins." Vibe contributor Rondell Conway wrote that, "Slim's worldly sensibilities make the pensive moments on the album both heartfelt ("Dedicate") and heady ("The Interview"). All the while, he keeps his Teflon status intact–without telling any tall tales." Rolling Stone's Christian Hoard called the record "a popwise bastardization of the Houston rap scene's round-the-way charm", praising Slim's "down-home brassiness" delivering "brawny boasts and mesmerizing refrains", and the Neptunes' "arty minimalism" being better than on previous outings.

Entertainment Weekly writer Michael Endelman gave note of Slim having a "steady, linebacker-strong flow and [a] baritone" throughout the album but gave credit to the Neptunes for giving him "spacious and stark beats that are equal parts frightening and funky". Steve Jones of USA Today said that big names like T.I. and Jazze Pha didn't turn the attention away from the main artist, saying that "Slim [Thug]'s confident, laid-back deliveries keep him from being overshadowed." Chris Ryan of Spin commended Slim for lending his voice to the Neptunes' atmospheric production, saying they "contribute some of their most adventurous work yet." Tom Breihan of Pitchfork was critical of most of the tracks by the Neptunes, saying they "lost the gleaming, clattering swagger they once had, relying instead on bloodless synth lines and itchy, nattering drums" and that Slim's performance on them suffered. But said that the tracks by Mr. Lee ("Diamonds" and "3 Kings") were the highlights, concluding that, "On tracks like this, Slim sounds prehistoric, like he's always existed, like this voice has been echoing over canyons and through caves since before time began."

== Track listing ==
No.	Title	Writer(s)	Producer(s)	Length
1.	"The Intro"	Stayve Thomas; Leroy Williams; General Johnson; Barney Perkins; Greg Perry	Mr. Lee	2:24
2.	"Like a Boss"	Thomas; Pharrell Williams; Chad Hugo	The Neptunes	3:20
3.	"3 Kings" (featuring Bun B and T.I.)	Thomas; L. Williams; Bernard Freeman; Clifford Harris; Willie Clarke; Clarence Reid; Clinton Mansell; Sammie Norris; Cleavon Prince; Micah Troy	Mr. Lee	4:50
4.	"Diamonds"	Thomas; L. Williams; Chad Butler; Freeman; William Collins; Gary Cooper; George Clinton Jr.; Garry Shider	Mr. Lee	3:14
5.	"Boyz N Blue" (featuring Killa Kyleon, Sir Daily, PJ, and Chris Ward)	Thomas; Killa Kyleon; Sir Daily; PJ; Chris Ward	T.A.	3:50
6.	"I Ain't Heard of That (Remix)" (featuring Bun B)	Thomas; Shawn Carter; Freeman; P. Williams; Hugo	The Neptunes	3:49
7.	"Click Clack" (featuring Pusha T)	Thomas; P. Williams; Hugo; Terrance Thornton	The Neptunes	3:32
8.	"Everybody Loves a Pimp" (featuring Jazze Pha)	Thomas; Phalon Alexander; Zak Wallace	Jazze Pha	4:21
9.	"Already Platinum" (featuring Pharrell)	Thomas; P. Williams; Hugo	The Neptunes	4:47
10.	"Ashy to Classy"	Thomas; P. Williams; Hugo	The Neptunes	3:38
11.	"The Interview"	Thomas; Michael Clervoix; Robert Smith; Allan Felder; Norman Harris	Sha Money XL; Black Jeruz	2:47
12.	"Playa You Don't Know" (featuring Pharrell)	Thomas; P. Williams; Hugo	The Neptunes	4:30
13.	"Miss Mary"	Thomas; Andre Lyon; Marcello Valenzano; George Michael	Cool & Dre	4:28
14.	"Incredible Feelin'" (featuring Jazze Pha)	Thomas; Alexander; Wallace	Jazze Pha	4:35
15.	"This Is My Life" (featuring LeToya Luckett)	Thomas; P. Williams; Hugo	The Neptunes	4:10
16.	"Dedicate"	Thomas; P. Williams; Hugo	The Neptunes	4:33

Bonus CD
No.	Title	Producer(s)	Length
1.	"Welcome to Houston"	Mr. Lee	4:22
2.	"I'll Show Ya" (featuring Killa Kyleon and Chris Ward)	Mr. Lee	4:45
3.	"Represent Gangsta" (featuring Killa Kyleon and Sir Daily)	Mr. Lee	4:47
4.	"I Need A..." (featuring Killa Kyleon and Chris Ward)	Mr. Lee	4:18
5.	"Dope Man" (featuring Killa Kyleon)	Mr. Lee	4:08
6.	"3 Kings (Chopped and Screwed)" (featuring T.I. and Bun B)	Mr. Rogers	5:26
7.	"Like a Boss (Chopped and Screwed)"	Mr. Rogers	3:46
8.	"I Ain't Heard of That (Remix) (Chopped and Screwed)" (featuring Bun B and Pharrell)	Mr. Rogers	4:34

Sample credits

- "The Intro" contains excerpts from "Want Ads"; written by General Johnson, Barney Perkins, and Greg Perry; and performed by Honey Cone.
- "3 Kings" contains excerpts from:
  - "Secretary", written by Willie Clarke and Clarence Reid, and performed by Betty Wright.
  - "Throw It Up"; written by Clinton Mansell, Sammie Norris, Cleavon Prince, and Micah Troy; and performed by Lil Jon.
- "Diamonds" contains excerpts from "Diamonds & Wood", wri
- "Diamonds" samples "Top Notch Hoes" by Pimp C.
- "The Interview" samples "The Newness Is Gone" by Eddie Kendricks.
- "Miss Mary" samples "A Moment with You" by George Michael.
- "I Need A..." samples "Out There" by Willie Hutch.
- "Dope Man" samples "Just to Keep You Satisfied" by Marvin Gaye.
- "I'll Show Ya" samples "Stay in Love with Me" by Trinere.

== Personnel ==
Credits for Already Platinum adapted from AllMusic.

- Leslie Braithwaite - mixing
- Bobby Brown - mixing
- Willie Clarke - composer
- George Clinton, Jr. - composer
- Andrew Coleman - engineer
- W. O. Collins - composer
- G. Cooper - composer
- Danielle Demmerella - marketing coordinator
- Jan Fairchild - mixing
- Allan Felder - composer
- Ashley Fox - marketing
- Sarah A. Friedman - photography
- Mike Frost - art direction, photography
- Brian "Big Bass" Gardner - mastering
- Brian Garten - engineer
- Mark "Exit" Goodchild - engineer
- Hart Gunther - assistant
- Clifford Harris - composer
- Norman Harris - composer
- Jaycen Joshua - engineer
- General Johnson - composer
- Jahaun Johnson - A&R, executive producer
- Killa Kyleon - composer
- Anthony Mandler - cover photo, photography
- Manny Marroquin - mixing
- George Michael - composer
- Kyla Miller - engineer
- The Neptunes - executive producer
- Barney Perkins - composer
- Gregg Perry - composer
- Nicole Plantin - A&R
- Clarence Reid - composer
- April Roomet - stylist
- Justin Shtturtz - assistant
- Shawn Suggs - A&R
- Phil Tan - mixing
- S. Thomas - composer
- Terrence Thornton - composer
- Richard Travali - mixing
- Patrick Viala - mixing
- Rob Walker - executive producer
- James M. Wisner - assistant

== Charts ==
=== Weekly charts ===
Chart (2005)	Peak position
US Billboard 200	2
US Top R&B/Hip-Hop Albums (Billboard)	2

=== Year-end charts ===
Chart (2005)	Position
US Billboard 200	190
US Top R&B/Hip-Hop Albums (Billboard)	48

== Certifications ==
Region	Certification	Certified units/sales
United States (RIAA)	Gold	500,000^{‡}
^{‡} Sales+streaming figures based on certification alone.
