= So High (Slim Thug song) =

Single by Slim Thug featuring B.o.B

from the album Tha Thug Show
- Released: September 30, 2010
- Recorded: 2010
- Genre: Hip hop
- Length: 3:58
- Label: Boss Hogg Outlawz; E1 Music
- Songwriters: Stayve Thomas; Bobby Simmons; James Bernard Rosser; Brandon Rackley; Clarence Montgomery
- Producer: Nard & B

Slim Thug singles chronology
"Gangsta" (2010)	"So High" (2010)	"I'm from Texas" (2012)

B.o.B singles chronology
"Magic" (2010)	"So High" (2010)	"Price Tag" (2011)

Music video
- "So High" on YouTube

"So High" is a song by American rapper Slim Thug, released on September 30, 2010, as the second single from his third studio album, Tha Thug Show (2010). The song, produced by Nard & B, features vocals from fellow American rapper B.o.B.

== Background ==
"So High" has been called an unlikely collaboration multiple times being between a hardcore Texas rapper in Slim Thug and hip hop, rock crossover artist in B.o.B.

== Music video ==
The music video which is directed by Parris debuted on VEVO on October 21, 2010.

== Critical reception ==
The song has been described as a radio friendly single. Rapreviews.com praised B.o.B's guest spot on the song.

== Track listing ==
iTunes single digital download

1. "So High"(featuring B.o. B) - 3:58

== Charts ==
Chart (2010)	Peak position
US Bubbling Under Hot 100 (Billboard)	25
US Hot R&B/Hip-Hop Songs (Billboard)	35
US Hot Rap Songs (Billboard)	19

== Release history ==
Region	Date	Format
United States	September 29, 2010	digital download on iTunes
