= Hogg Life: The Beginning =

Studio album by Slim Thug
- Released: February 3, 2015
- Recorded: 2014
- Genre: Hip hop
- Length: 50:46
- Label: Hogg Life; Empire
- Producer: Slim Thug (exec.); GL Productions

Slim Thug chronology
Boss Life (2013)	Hogg Life: The Beginning (2015)	Hogg Life, Vol. 2: Still Surviving (2015)

Professional ratings
Review scores
Source	Rating
AllMusic	3.5/5 stars
HipHopDX	3.5/5

Hogg Life: The Beginning is the fifth solo studio album by American rapper Slim Thug. The album was released on February 17, 2015, through Hogg Life/Empire Distribution. Production was handled by G Luck and B Don, with Slim Thug serving as executive producer. It features guest appearances from Z-Ro, Chayse, M.U.G, Propain, Sauce Twinz and Sosamann. The album peaked at number 131 on the US Billboard 200.

The album spawned three follow-up sequel albums: Hogg Life, Vol. 2: Still Surviving, released on July 10, 2015, Hogg Life, Vol. 3: Hustler of the Year, released on October 30, 2015, and Hogg Life Vol. 4: American King, released on August 5, 2016.

== Track listing ==
All music is composed by Gavin "G Luck" Luckett and Brandon "B Don" Pitre.

No.	Title	Length
1.	"Hogg Life"	2:57
2.	"All I Kno" (featuring Propain)	3:25
3.	"RIP" (featuring Z-Ro)	3:38
4.	"5K1"	3:16
5.	"55" (featuring Z-Ro and M.U.G)	3:46
6.	"Self Made" (featuring Sosa Mann)	3:39
7.	"Money Fever" (featuring Sauce Twins)	4:18
8.	"Ignant "Gettin' In""	3:13
9.	"No Talking"	4:17
10.	"Smokin'" (featuring Z-Ro)	4:06
11.	"Nobody" (featuring Chayse)	4:25
12.	"Too Much" (featuring Z-Ro)	4:10
13.	"The Top"	2:58
14.	"Drophead Freestyle"	3:29
Total length:		50:46

== Charts ==
Chart performance for Hogg Life: The Beginning
Chart (2015)	Peak position
US Billboard 200	131
US Top R&B/Hip-Hop Albums (Billboard)	15
US Top Rap Albums (Billboard)	8
US Independent Albums (Billboard)	13
