= Boyz-n-Blue =

Studio album by Boss Hogg Outlawz
- Released: April 20, 2004
- Recorded: 2003–2004
- Genre: Southern hip-hop; gangsta rap; chopped and screwed
- Length: 2:09:05
- Label: Boss Hogg Outlawz
- Producer: Slim Thug (exec.); Rayface (exec.); Mr. Lee

Boss Hogg Outlawz chronology
| Boyz-n-Blue (2004) | Serve & Collect (2007) |

Professional ratings
Review scores
| Source | Rating |
|---|---|
| RapReviews | 7/10 stars |

Boyz-n-Blue is the debut studio album by American hip-hop group Boss Hogg Outlawz. It was released independently on April 20, 2004, through their own Boss Hogg Outlawz record label. The album was released as a 2-disc set with one side featuring the original mix and the other featuring the songs chopped and screwed. Leroy "Mr. Lee" Williams produced all the songs on the album while DJ Yellaboy provided the chopped and screwed mix on disc two.

Though more of a local success than a commercial hit, Boyz-n-Blue spent one week on the Billboard Top R&B/Hip-Hop Albums, peaking at number 78 during the week of May 8, 2004.

== Track listing ==
All music is composed by Mr. Lee.

Disc 1
| No. | Title | Producer(s) | Length |
|---|---|---|---|
| 1. | "Intro" | Mr. Lee | 1:26 |
| 2. | "Boyz-n-Blue" | Mr. Lee | 3:38 |
| 3. | "Represent Gangsta" | Mr. Lee | 4:43 |
| 4. | "Come Here" | Mr. Lee | 4:47 |
| 5. | "Boss Hogg Outlawz" | Mr. Lee | 4:18 |
| 6. | "Dope Man" | Mr. Lee | 4:05 |
| 7. | "Skit" | Mr. Lee | 1:41 |
| 8. | "I Need A..." | Mr. Lee | 4:15 |
| 9. | "Rainin" | Mr. Lee | 4:21 |
| 10. | "It's So" | Mr. Lee | 4:09 |
| 11. | "Good Ole Luv" | Mr. Lee | 4:09 |
| 12. | "It's Going Down" | Mr. Lee | 4:14 |
| 13. | "Get Back" | Mr. Lee | 4:02 |
| 14. | "Whatcha Know" | Mr. Lee | 4:34 |
| 15. | "Listen" | Mr. Lee | 4:21 |
| 16. | "I'll Show Ya" | Mr. Lee | 4:41 |

Disc 2 - chopped and screwed by DJ Yella Boy
| No. | Title | Producer(s) | Length |
|---|---|---|---|
| 17. | "Intro" | DJ Yella Boy | 1:41 |
| 18. | "It's Going Down" | DJ Yella Boy | 4:31 |
| 19. | "Represent Gangsta" | DJ Yella Boy | 4:13 |
| 20. | "I'll Show Ya" | DJ Yella Boy | 3:28 |
| 21. | "Come Here" | DJ Yella Boy | 4:13 |
| 22. | "Rainin" | DJ Yella Boy | 5:08 |
| 23. | "It's So" | DJ Yella Boy | 4:32 |
| 24. | "Good Ole Luv" | DJ Yella Boy | 4:15 |
| 25. | "Whatcha Know" | DJ Yella Boy | 5:03 |
| 26. | "Get Back" | DJ Yella Boy | 4:24 |
| 27. | "Dope Man" | DJ Yella Boy | 4:38 |
| 28. | "Boyz-n-Blue" | DJ Yella Boy | 4:36 |
| 29. | "Listen" | DJ Yella Boy | 4:05 |
| 30. | "Boss Hogg Outlawz" | DJ Yella Boy | 5:36 |
| 31. | "I Need A..." | DJ Yella Boy | 5:18 |
| Total length: | | | 2:09:05 |

== Personnel ==
- Stayve Jerome Thomas – performer (tracks: 1–6, 8–16), executive producer
- Kyle Jeroderrick Riley – performer (tracks: 2–6, 8–13, 15–16)
- T. Harris – performer (tracks: 2–5, 9, 11, 13–14)
- Chris Ward – performer (tracks: 4–5, 8, 10, 12, 14–16)
- Lil' Mel – performer (track 10)
- Dre Day – performer (track 15)
- Leroy Williams Jr. – producer (tracks: 1–16)
- DJ Yella Boy – mixing (tracks: 17–31)
- Raymond Thomas – executive producer
- Mike Frost – artwork, photography

== Charts ==
| Chart (2004) | Peak position |
|---|---|
| US Top R&B/Hip-Hop Albums (Billboard) | 78 |
