= American King =

Studio album by Slim Thug
- Released: August 5, 2016
- Genres: Hip-hop; gangsta rap; hardcore hip-hop
- Length: 58:56
- Labels: Hogg Life; EMPIRE
- Producers: Cy Fyre; DJ Grim; Donnie Houston; GL Productions; June James; Mr. Lee

Slim Thug chronology
| Hogg Life, Vol. 3: Hustler of the Year (2015) | American King (2016) | Welcome 2 Houston (2017) |

Professional ratings
Review scores
| Source | Rating |
|---|---|
| HipHopDX | 3.5/5 |

Hogg Life Vol. 4: American King (shortened as American King) is the eighth solo studio album by American rapper Slim Thug. It was released on August 5, 2016, through Hogg Life, serving as the fourth installment of the rapper's Hogg Life album series. Production was handled by Mr. Lee, G Luck, B Don, Donnie Houston, DJ Grim, Cy Fyre and June James. It features guest appearances from Boosie Badazz, Nikki Lactson and XO On The Beat. The album peaked at number 179 on the US Billboard 200.

AllMusic's Neil Z. Yeung wrote: "with his distinctive deep voice, [Slim] Thug incorporates laid-back contemporary production atop his usual Dirty South-meets-G-Funk sound".

Music videos were directed for "King", "Enemy", "They Just Wanna Be Heard", "Real" and "Peaceful".

== Track listing ==
| No. | Title | Producer(s) | Length |
|---|---|---|---|
| 1. | "King" | DJ Grim | 3:58 |
| 2. | "Enemy" | Mr. Lee | 3:40 |
| 3. | "Family" | Mr. Lee | 3:48 |
| 4. | "Get Better" | Mr. Lee | 3:44 |
| 5. | "Hustle" (featuring Z-Ro) | G Luck; B Don | 3:13 |
| 6. | "Get Rich" | G Luck; B Don | 3:25 |
| 7. | "They Just Wanna Be Heard" (featuring Lil' Boosie) | G Luck; B Don | 3:34 |
| 8. | "IDKY" (featuring X.O.) | G Luck; B Don | 3:40 |
| 9. | "Real" | Donnie Houston | 3:04 |
| 10. | "Peaceful" | Donnie Houston | 3:43 |
| 11. | "1000" (featuring Lil' Boosie) | June James | 4:28 |
| 12. | "Hold Your Head Up" | Cy Fyre | 4:15 |
| 13. | "Love Letter" | G Luck; B Don | 3:19 |
| 14. | "He Will" | Mr. Lee | 4:30 |
| 15. | "Chuuch" (featuring Nikki Lactson) | Mr. Lee | 6:35 |
| Total length: | | | 58:56 |

== Personnel ==
- Stayve "Slim Thug Thomas – main artist, executive producer
- Torrence "Boosie Badazz" Hatch – featured artist (tracks: 7, 11)
- XO On The Beat – featured artist (track 8)
- Nikki Lactson – featured artist (track 15)
- DJ Grim – producer (track 1)
- Leroy "Mr. Lee" Williams – producer (tracks: 2–4, 14, 15)
- Gavin "G Luck" Luckett – producer (tracks: 8, 13)
- Brandon "B Don" Pitre – producer (tracks: 8, 13)
- Dondric "Donnie Houston" Joseph – producer (tracks: 9, 10)
- June James – producer (track 11)
- Cy Fyre – producer (track 12)
- Christian "CQ" Quinonez – mixing (tracks: 9, 10)
- Greg Noire – photography

== Charts ==
Chart performance for American King
| Chart (2016) | Peak position |
|---|---|
| US Billboard 200 | 179 |
| US Top R&B/Hip-Hop Albums (Billboard) | 15 |
| US Top Rap Albums (Billboard) | 9 |
| US Independent Albums (Billboard) | 14 |
