= Boss Life =

Studio album by Slim Thug
- Released: November 19, 2013
- Recorded: 2011–2013
- Genre: Hip hop
- Length: 66:11
- Label: Hogg Life
- Producers: Big K.R.I.T.; G Luck 'n B Don; Mr. Lee; Play-N-Skillz; Ralo

Slim Thug chronology
Tha Thug Show (2010)	Boss Life (2013)	Hogg Life: The Beginning (2015)

Singles from Boss Life
- 1. "Coming Down (Every Town)" Released: August 20, 2013; 2. "Flex 4Eva" Released: August 29, 2013

Boss Life is the fourth studio album by American rapper Slim Thug. The album was released on November 19, 2013. The album features guest appearances from Big Sant, Big K.R.I.T., Paul Wall, Chamillionaire, Kirko Bangz, Z-Ro, BeatKing, Boston George, Bun B, Yo Gotti, Kevin Gates, Muggs, JustBrittany, Lil' Keke and Nipsey Hussle.

== Singles ==
On August 20, 2013, the album's first single "Coming Down (Every Town)" featuring Kirko Bangz, Big K.R.I.T. & Z-Ro was released. On August 29, 2013, the album's second single "Flex 4Eva" featuring Beat King and Boston George was released. On January 29, 2014, the music video was released for "Flex 4Eva" featuring Beat King and Boston George.

== Track listing ==
No.	Title	Producer(s)	Length
1.	"U Mad (It Ain't Easy Interlude)"	Mr. Lee	3:24
2.	"Long Time"	G Luck 'n B Don	3:57
3.	"Just Chill" (featuring Big Sant & Big K.R.I.T.)	Big K.R.I.T.	3:55
4.	"84S"	Big K.R.I.T.	2:52
5.	"Love It" (featuring Paul Wall & Chamillionaire)	Mr. Lee	4:43
6.	"Coming Down (Every Town)" (featuring Kirko Bangz, Big K.R.I.T. & Z-Ro)	Mr. Lee	4:55
7.	"Gotta Eat"	G Luck 'n B Don	3:03
8.	"King Keraun (Skit)"		1:23
9.	"Flex 4Eva" (featuring BeatKing & Boston George)	G Luck 'n B Don	3:50
10.	"Cocaine" (featuring Boston George & Bun B)	Mr. Lee	4:23
11.	"Boss Life"	G Luck 'n B Don	3:31
12.	"1st n 15th (I'm Addicted Skit)" (featuring Yo Gotti)	Play-N-Skillz	4:01
13.	"Bomb Ass Pussy"	G Luck 'n B Don	3:12
14.	"Puttin In Work"	Mr. Lee	3:38
15.	"What U Mean To Me" (featuring Kevin Gates & Muggs)	G Luck 'n B Don	4:13
16.	"Slowed Down" (featuring JustBrittany & Lil' Keke)	Mr. Lee	3:14
17.	"One Night" (featuring Kirko Bangz)	G Luck 'n B Don	3:37
18.	"Go Long" (featuring Z-Ro & Nipsey Hussle)	Ralo	4:53

== Charts ==
Chart (2013)	Peak position
US Top R&B/Hip-Hop Albums (Billboard)	28
