= Big Tuck =

American rapper

- Born: Cedric Lee Juan Tuck
- Origin: Dallas, Texas
- Genres: Hip hop, Gangsta rap
- Occupation: Rapper
- Years active: 2004–active
- Label: Universal Records
- Website: thabigtuckshow.com

Cedric Lee Juan Tuck, known mostly by his stage name Big Tuck, is an American rapper from Dallas, Texas. He is a member of the Dallas rap group Dirty South Rydaz.

== Biography ==
Tuck was born on March 29, 1979. He grew up in the Queen City neighborhood of South Dallas, where he attended Lincoln High School, and studied music at the University of Arkansas at Pine Bluff.

After dropping out of college, Tuck returned to South Dallas to begin performing rap music. In 2004, he joined a seven member band, Dirty South Rydaz. He also recorded a successful independent solo album, Purple Hulk, that led to Big Tuck and Dirty South Rydaz being signed by Universal in November 2005. In 2006, he released the album Tha Absolute Truth which featured Erykah Badu, Chamillionaire, and Paul Wall. The album peaked at number 27 on the Billboard Top R&B/Hip-Hop Albums chart and at number 14 on the Billboard Top Rap Albums chart.

== Discography ==
=== Albums ===
Album name	Original Release Date
Tha Absolute Truth	December 12, 2006

=== Mixtapes ===
Mixtape name	Original Release Date
Purple Hulk	September 1, 2004
DJ Smallz Presents Big Tuck: "Polar Bear"	August 25, 2005
Straight Outta Texas Vol. 1	March 14, 2006
DJ Drop Presents: Hell on Em, Volume 1	2008

=== Singles ===
Title	Featuring Guest(s)	Album	Year
“Tussle”	Tum Tum, Slim Thug	Purple Hulk	2004
“Tussle (Remix)”	Tum Tum, Slim Thug	Purple Hulk	2004
“Southside Da Realist”	None	Purple Hulk	2004
“Not A Stain On Me”	Fat Bastard	DJ Drop Presents: Hell on Em, Volume 1	2008
“Not A Stain On Me (Remix)”	Slim Thug, Gucci Mane	None	2008

== Chart positions ==
Chart	Peak Position
U.S. Billboard Top R&B/Hip-Hop Albums	27
U.S. Billboard Top Rap Albums	14
