= Serve & Collect III =

Studio album by Boss Hogg Outlawz
- Released: August 30, 2011
- Recorded: 2010–2011
- Genre: Southern hip-hop; gangsta rap
- Length: 1:13:04
- Label: Boss Hogg Outlawz; eOne
- Producer: Slim Thug (exec.); Rayface (exec.); Mr. Lee; GL Productions; B Don; KC; Mr. Rogers

Boss Hogg Outlawz chronology
Back by Blockular Demand: Serve & Collect II (2008)	Serve & Collect III (2011)

Professional ratings
Review scores
Source	Rating
AllMusic	3/5 stars

Serve & Collect III is the fourth and final studio album by American hip-hop group Boss Hogg Outlawz. It was released on August 30, 2011, through Boss Hogg Outlawz/eOne Music. The album marked the departure of founding members Chris Ward and Killa Kyleon, who left the group prior to the album's release.

The album did not chart on the Billboard 200, though it did make it to four other charts including the R&B and rap charts.

== Track listing ==
No.	Title	Producer(s)	Length
1.	"What Up"	KC	4:33
2.	"Biz"	Mr. Lee	4:00
3.	"Top of the World"	Mr. Lee	4:14
4.	"Concrete"	B Don; G Luck	3:59
5.	"Bang"	B Don; G Luck	3:52
6.	"Anybody Can Get It"	Mr. Lee	3:50
7.	"Shut Yo Hood Down"	Mr. Lee	4:36
8.	"If I Don't"	Mr. Lee	3:45
9.	"Helping Hand"	KC	3:53
10.	"Nomoe Pain"	Mr. Lee	5:13
11.	"Fucking This Game Up"	Mr. Lee	4:50
12.	"Hogg Life"	Mr. Lee	5:28
13.	"Turn My Knock Up"	B Don; G Luck	3:56
14.	"Murder"	Mr. Lee	3:49
15.	"Roofless"	Mr. Lee	5:55
16.	"Get It"	Mr. Rogers	7:11
Total length:			1:13:04

ITunes Store Bonus Tracks
No.	Title	Producer(s)	Length
17.	"G'd Up"	B Don; G Luck	3:09
18.	"Hustla"	Mr. Lee	4:17

== Personnel ==
- Stayve Jerome Thomas – performer (tracks: 1–14), executive producer
- M.U.G. – performer (tracks: 2, 4–5, 9–13, 16)
- Andre "Dre Day" Stephens – performer (tracks: 1–3, 7–8, 11–12, 14)
- Le$ – performer (tracks: 3–7, 11–14)
- Larry Wayne Jones Jr. – performer (tracks: 1, 3, 6, 8–10)
- S. Witfield – performer (tracks: 12, 15–16)
- T. Harris – performer (track 15)
- Mark A. Miller – performer (track 10)
- Hoodstar Chantz – performer (track 15)
- King Rashee – performer (track 15)
- Lil Ray – performer (track 15)
- Leroy Williams Jr. – producer (tracks: 2–3, 6–8, 10–12, 14–15, 18), mixing (track 11)
- Brandon Pitre – producer (tracks: 4–5, 13, 17)
- Gavin Luckett – producer (tracks: 4–5, 13, 17), mixing & engineering (tracks: 4–5, 13)
- K.C. Tha Realist – producer (tracks: 1, 9)
- Justin Rogers – producer (tracks 16)
- DJ Ryno – mixing (tracks: 1–3, 6–10, 12, 14–15)
- J.T. – mixing (tracks: 1–3, 6–10, 12, 14–15)
- Raymond Thomas – mixing (track 16), engineering (tracks: 3, 7, 14, 16), executive producer
- Derick Tisby – engineering (tracks: 1–2, 6, 8–12)
- Young Samm – engineering (track 15)
- Michael George Dean – mastering
- Mike Frost – artwork & design

== Chart history ==
Chart (2011)	Peak position
US Top R&B/Hip-Hop Albums (Billboard)	37
US Top Rap Albums (Billboard)	23
US Independent Albums (Billboard)	36
US Heatseekers Albums (Billboard)	9
