= Tha Thug Show =

Studio album by Slim Thug
- Released: November 30, 2010
- Recorded: 2009–2010
- Studios: Noddfactor Studios (Euless, TX)
- Genres: Hip-hop; gangsta rap
- Length: 59:09
- Labels: Boss Hogg Outlawz; eOne
- Producers: Beanz 'N Kornbread; Cy Fyre; KC; Izzy the Kidd; Lex Luger; Midus; Mr. Lee; Nard & B; Play-N-Skillz

Slim Thug chronology
Boss of All Bosses (2009)	Tha Thug Show (2010)	Boss Life (2013)

Singles from Tha Thug Show
- 1. "Gangsta" Released: July 2, 2010; 2. "So High" Released: September 30, 2010

Professional ratings
Review scores
Source	Rating
AllMusic	3.5/5 stars
HipHopDX	3/5
RapReviews	7.5/10

Tha Thug Show is the third solo studio album by American rapper Slim Thug. It was released on November 30, 2010 through his Boss Hogg Outlawz label with distribution via eOne Music.

Production was handled by Mr. Lee, Beanz & Kornbread, Cy Fyre, KC, Izzy the Kidd, Lex Luger, Midus, Nard & B, Play-N-Skillz, with Slim Thug himself serving as executive producer. It features guest appearances from Big Chief, Big K.R.I.T., B.o.B, Dallas Blocker, Devin the Dude, J-Dawg, Lil' Keke, Nipsey Hussle, Rick Ross, Yo Gotti and Z-Ro.

In the United States, the album peaked at number 89 on the Billboard 200, number 17 on the Top R&B/Hip-Hop Albums, number 7 on the Top Rap Albums and number 5 on the Independent Albums charts.

The album was supported by two singles: "Gangsta" and "So High". Its lead single reached only number 64 on the Hot R&B/Hip-Hop Songs chart, while the follow-up single made it to number 25 on the Bubbling Under Hot 100, number 35 on the Hot R&B/Hip-Hop Songs, number 19 on the Hot Rap Songs charts.

== Track listing ==
No.	Title	Writer(s)	Producer(s)	Length
1.	"Tha Thug Show"	Stayve Thomas; Cyshae Strachan	Cy Fyre	3:23
2.	"The Sky"	Thomas; Leroy Williams	Mr. Lee	3:16
3.	"Gangsta" (featuring Z-Ro)	Thomas; Joseph Wayne McVey	Mr. Lee	4:12
4.	"How We Do It" (featuring Rick Ross)	Thomas; Talib Kweli Greene; Calvin Broadus; Tony Cottrell	Lex Luger	3:33
5.	"Movie" (featuring Rimidi)	Thomas	Midus	3:24
6.	"Neighborhood Supa Stars" (featuring Nipsey Hussle and Yo Gotti)	Thomas	Mr. Lee	3:51
7.	"100's" (featuring Big Chief and Lil' Keke)	Thomas	Mr. Lee	4:11
8.	"Beat It Up" (featuring Dallas Blocker)	Thomas	Mr. Lee	3:36
9.	"So High" (featuring B.o.B)	Thomas; Bobby Simmons; James Bernard Rosser; Brandon Rackley; Clarence Montgomery	Nard & B	3:56
10.	"Free"	Thomas; Juan Carlos Salinas; Oscar Edward Salinas; Matthew Bair; Franny Graham	Play-N-Skillz	4:01
11.	"Celebration"	Thomas	Mr. Lee	3:44
12.	"Caddy Music" (featuring Devin the Dude)	Thomas; Devin Copeland	Mr. Lee	5:25
13.	"Coming From" (featuring J-Dawg and Big K.R.I.T.)	Thomas; Matthew Allan Taylor	KC	4:11
14.	"Murda"	Thomas; Kenneth Roy	Beanz-N-Kornbread	3:53
15.	"Do It Again" (featuring Keisa)	Thomas	Mr. Lee	4:33
Total length:				59:09

Exclusive Best Buy bonus tracks
No.	Title	Writer(s)	Producer(s)	Length
16.	"Fuck U"	Thomas; Williams	Mr. Lee	4:18
17.	"Outta Dere"	Thomas; Williams	Mr. Lee	4:16
18.	"Slim Thugga Pimpin'" (Thomas)		Izzy the Kidd	5:17

Deluxe Edition bonus tracks
No.	Title	Producer(s)	Length
16.	"So High" (Instrumental)	Nard & B	3:53
17.	"Gangsta" (Instrumental)	Mr. Lee	4:13

== Charts ==
Chart (2010)	Peak position
US Billboard 200	89
US Top R&B/Hip-Hop Albums (Billboard)	17
US Top Rap Albums (Billboard)	7
