= Mr. Lee (music producer) =

Background information
- Born: Leroy Williams Jr.
- Origin: Houston, Texas, U.S.
- Genres: Hip hop; R&B
- Occupations: Record producer; recording engineer; author
- Years active: 1997–present
- Labels: Rap-A-Lot Records; Noddfactor Entertainment
- Website: mrleeonthetrack.com

Leroy Williams Jr., professionally known by his stage name Mr. Lee, is an American record producer, author and entrepreneur from Houston, Texas. He was one of the in-house producers of Rap-A-Lot Records and has produced for Scarface, 2Pac, Bun B, Pimp C, Paul Wall, Slim Thug, Z-Ro and Nipsey Hussle. His credits include Bun B's "Get Throwed", later sampled by Drake and Busta Rhymes, most of Pimp C's posthumous album Long Live the Pimp, and Nipsey Hussle's "Blue Laces 2" from the Grammy-nominated album Victory Lap. He is the founder and CEO of Noddfactor Entertainment and the author of the music business guide Give Em the Biz: Learning the Process.

== Early life ==
Williams was raised in Pineville, Louisiana, where he began playing piano at age nine and played gospel music in church. He played in the McDonald's All-American Band in 1990 and was the first Black drum major at Tioga High School.

== Career ==
=== 1990s ===
Williams turned to hip hop at age 21 and formed the rap group Four Deep before moving to Houston in 1995. After meeting Rap-A-Lot vice president Big Chief, he signed with the label as an in-house producer. In the late 1990s he produced for the Geto Boys' Da Good Da Bad & Da Ugly (1998), 2Pac and the Outlawz' Still I Rise (1999) and Scarface's Platinum-certified My Homies (1998), where he co-produced "Win Lose or Draw" with Scarface and Mike Dean. According to his official website, his productions have appeared on nine platinum and six gold albums.

=== 2000s ===
In 2000 he produced ten tracks on Scarface's Gold-certified The Last of a Dying Breed. In 2005 he produced three tracks on Bun B's debut album Trill, also certified Gold: "Get Throwed" featuring Pimp C, Z-Ro, Jeezy and Jay-Z, "Pushin'" featuring Scarface and Jeezy, and "I'm a 'G'" featuring T.I. "Get Throwed" reached number 24 on the Billboard Hot Rap Songs chart. That same year he also worked on Paul Wall's The Peoples Champ and Slim Thug's Already Platinum. In 2007 he produced nine tracks on Paul Wall's Get Money, Stay True, including the single "Break 'Em Off" featuring Lil' Keke, as well as songs featuring Snoop Dogg, Trina, Freeway and Jon B.

=== 2010s ===
In 2010 he produced Nipsey Hussle's "Blue Laces". In 2015 he produced ten of the sixteen tracks on Pimp C's posthumous album Long Live the Pimp, released on Mass Appeal Records, including the single "3-Way Freak" featuring Lil Wayne, "Ain't Said Shit" featuring Ty Dolla $ign and Devin the Dude, and "Bitch Get Down" by UGK featuring 8Ball & MJG. In 2018 he produced "Blue Laces 2", the sequel to "Blue Laces", on Hussle's debut studio album Victory Lap. The album was nominated for Best Rap Album at the 61st Annual Grammy Awards and certified 2× Platinum by the RIAA.

=== 2020s ===
"Get Throwed" was sampled on Drake's "N 2 Deep" featuring Future, from the number-one album Certified Lover Boy (2021), and on Busta Rhymes' "Big Everything" featuring DaBaby and T-Pain, from Blockbusta (2023). Williams received songwriting credit on both. He is also credited as a songwriter on Bobby Sessions' "Made A Way", including its remix featuring Lecrae. In February 2023 he published Give Em the Biz: Learning the Process, a 185-page guide to the music business that includes sample contracts. He later co-founded XMG Hip Hop, a hip hop news and interview site that spotlights up-and-coming artists as well as established names.

== Partial production discography ==
=== 1990s ===
1997

- Too Much Trouble - Too Much Weight
- 5th Ward Boyz - Usual Suspects

1998

- Scarface - My Homies
- Devin the Dude - The Dude
- Do or Die - Headz or Tailz
- Geto Boys - Da Good Da Bad & Da Ugly

1999

- Yukmouth - Thugged Out: The Albulation
- Big Mike - Hard to Hit
- 2Pac & Outlawz - Still I Rise

=== 2000s ===
2000

- Scarface - The Last of a Dying Breed
- Do or Die - Victory
- Outlawz - Ride wit Us or Collide wit Us

2001

- Yukmouth - Thug Lord: The New Testament

2002

- Devin the Dude - Just Tryin' ta Live
- Outlawz - Neva Surrenda
- Hussein Fatal - Fatal
- Luniz - Silver & Black
- Big Syke - Big Syke
- Facemob - Silence

2003

- Yukmouth - Godzilla
- Slim Thug & Lil' Keke - The Big Unit
- DMG - Black Roulette

2004

- Z-Ro - The Life of Joseph W. McVey
- Boss Hogg Outlawz - Boyz-n-Blue

2005

- Paul Wall - The Peoples Champ
- Lil' Flip & Z-Ro - Kings of the South
- Z-Ro - Let the Truth Be Told
- Bun B - Trill
- Slim Thug - Already Platinum

2006

- Z-Ro - I'm Still Livin'
- Pimp C - Pimpalation
- Scarface - My Homies Part 2
- Trae tha Truth - Restless

2007

- Trae tha Truth - Life Goes On
- Paul Wall - Get Money, Stay True
- Boss Hogg Outlawz - Serve & Collect

2008

- Yukmouth - Million Dollar Mouthpiece
- Bun B - II Trill
- ABN - It Is What It Is
- Z-Ro - Crack
- Boss Hogg Outlawz - Back by Blockular Demand: Serve & Collect II
- Lil' Keke - Loved by Few, Hated by Many
- Mya - Sugar & Spice

2009

- Slim Thug - Boss of All Bosses

=== 2010s ===
2010

- Slim Thug - Tha Thug Show
- Nipsey Hussle - The Marathon

2011

- Boss Hogg Outlawz - Serve & Collect III

2012

- David Banner - Sex, Drugs & Video Games

2013

- Slim Thug - Boss Life

2014

- Z-Ro - The Crown

2015

- Pimp C - Long Live the Pimp

2018

- Nipsey Hussle - Victory Lap

=== 2020s ===
2021

- Drake – Certified Lover Boy

2023

- Busta Rhymes - Blockbusta

2025

- Slim Thug & Propain - Double Cup
- Slim Thug & Lil' Keke - Double Cup, Pt. 2: Da Re-Up

2026

- Lil' Keke - Streets Is My Witness
