= Boss Hogg Outlawz =

Hip-hop duo

- Origin: Houston, Texas, U.S.
- Genres: Southern hip-hop; gangsta rap
- Years active: 2001–2011
- Labels: Boss Hogg Outlawz; eOne
- Past members: Chris Ward; Dre Day; J-Dawg; Killa Kyleon; LE$ Lil Ray; PJ; Sir Daily; Slim Thug; Young Black; Young Von; M.U.G. (deceased)

Boss Hogg Outlawz were an American hip-hop collective from Houston, Texas formed and led by Slim Thug. The collective originally included Le$, Sludge Von, C. Ward, J-Dawg, Killa Kyleon, Sir Daily, Lil Ray, Young Black, Dre Day, PJ & M.U.G. (Deceased).

The group got its start with in 2001 when Slim Thug and E.S.G. released a collaboration album Boss Hogg Outlaws. In 2004, Slim assembled a group of Houston rappers and released the first Boss Hogg Outlawz album Boyz-n-Blue. In 2006, the group signed a deal with Koch Records (now E1 Music) and released a second album entitled Serve & Collect in 2007. The following year saw the release of Back by Blockular Demand: Serve & Collect II. The group returned in 2011 with a third Serve & Collect album though both C. Ward and Killa Kyleon had left the group and did not appear on the album.

== Discography ==
List of albums, with selected chart positions
Title	Album details	Peak chart positions		
Title	Album details	US	US R&B	US Rap
Boyz-n-Blue	Released: April 20, 2004; Label: Boss Hogg Outlawz; Format: CD, digital download	—	78	—
Serve & Collect	Released: February 27, 2007; Label: Boss Hogg Outlawz, Koch; Format: CD, digital download	63	10	4
Back by Blockular Demand: Serve & Collect II	Released: September 2, 2008; Label: Boss Hogg Outlawz, Koch; Format: CD, digital download	47	7	5
Serve & Collect III	Released: August 30, 2011; Label: Boss Hogg Outlawz, eOne Music; Format: CD, digital download	—	37	23
