= Slim Thug =

American rapper

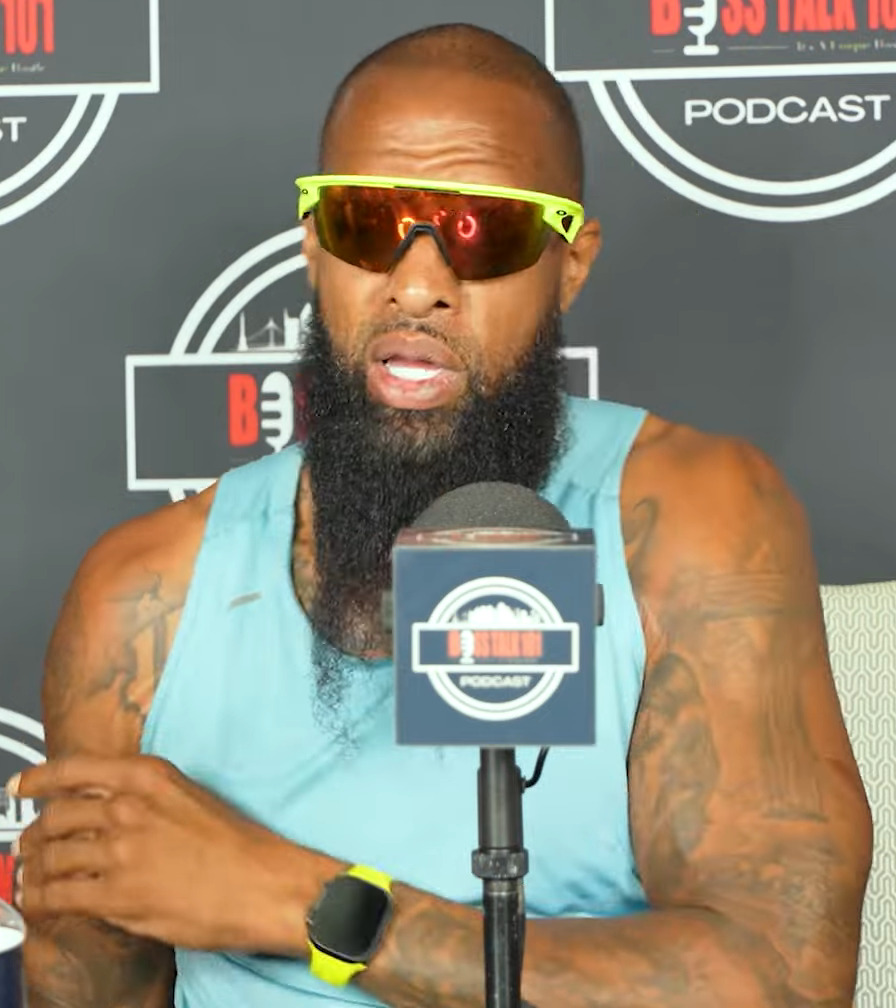
- Thomas In 2025 at BOSS TALK 101

Background information
- Born: Stayve Jerome Thomas; September 8, 1980 (age 46); Houston, Texas, U.S.
- Genres: Hip-hop; chopped and screwed
- Occupations: Rapper; songwriter
- Works: Slim Thug discography
- Years active: 1998–present
- Labels: Swishahouse; Boss Hogg Outlawz; E1; Rap-A-Lot; Star Trak; Interscope; Geffen
- Formerly of: Boss Hogg Outlawz

Stayve Jerome Thomas (born September 8, 1980) better known by his stage name Slim Thug, is an American rapper. He gained mainstream attention for his guest performance alongside Paul Wall on Mike Jones' 2004 single "Still Tippin'". The following year, he guest appeared alongside Bun B on Beyoncé's 2005 single "Check on It"—which peaked atop the Billboard Hot 100 and won an MTV Music Video Award—and signed with Interscope Geffen A&M and the Neptunes' Star Trak Entertainment to release his debut studio album Already Platinum (2005). It peaked at number two on the Billboard 200 and was followed by his second album, Boss of All Bosses (2009), which peaked at number 15 as an independent release.

Furthermore, Thomas guest appeared on Gwen Stefani's 2005 single "Luxurious", which peaked at number 21 on the Billboard Hot 100.

== Early life ==
At age 17, he performed freestyle raps at local high school parties. He began his rap career with Swishahouse in the late 1990s. After realizing how much money he could make distributing his own mixtapes, he parted ways with Swishahouse on good terms and formed his own independent label, Boss Hogg Outlawz. Thomas bought two record stores and worked in real estate. Stayve attended Eisenhower High School.

== Career ==
=== Already Platinum (2005–08) ===
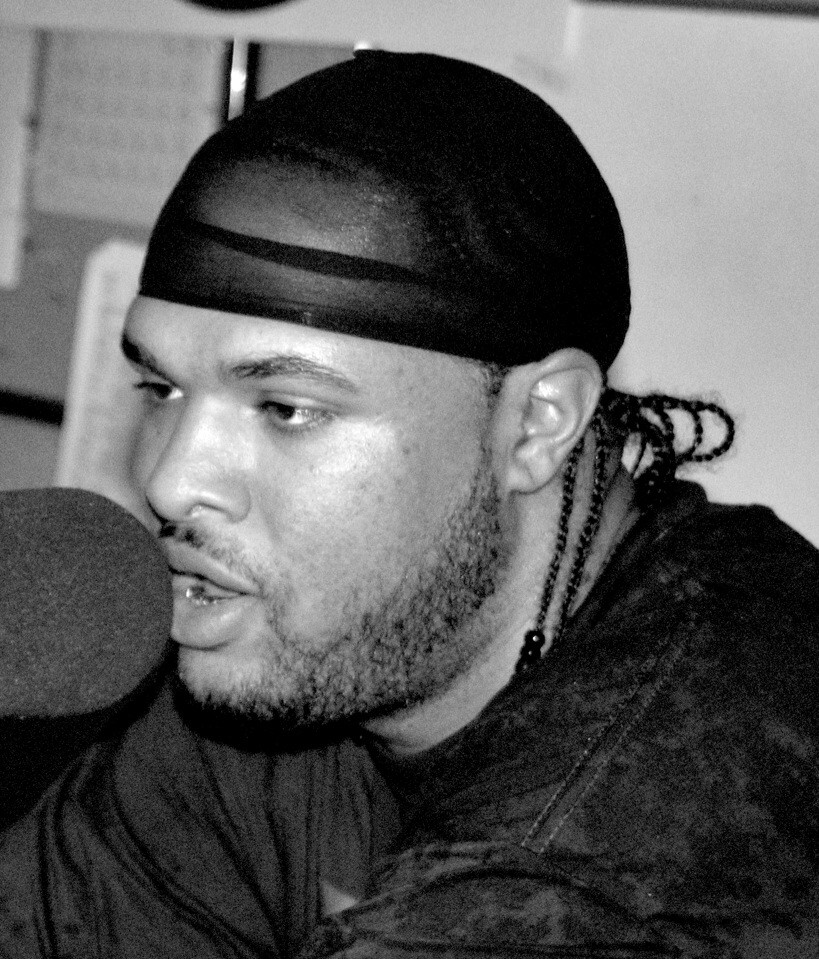
Slim Thug in 2005

Slim Thug, alongside Paul Wall, guest performed on fellow Houstonian Mike Jones' 2004 single "Still Tippin'", which peaked at number 60 on the Billboard Hot 100, received platinum certification by the Recording Industry Association of America (RIAA), and led all three rappers to mainstream recognition. Slim Thug signed with Interscope Geffen A&M Records, and was paired with American singer Pharrell Williams to further to his career. Williams' Star Trak Entertainment and Interscope Records released Thug's debut album, Already Platinum, in July 2005 after several delays.

Critical responses were generally positive and the album peaked at number two on the Billboard 200 chart, selling 130,000 units in its first week. Its singles included "Like a Boss", "3 Kings" (featuring T.I. and Bun B) and "I Ain't Heard of That" (featuring Pharrell and Bun B). Also in 2005, Thug gained wider recognition with his appearance on fellow Houstonian, singer Beyoncé's single "Check on It", which peaked atop the Billboard Hot 100, and Gwen Stefani's "Luxurious", which peaked at number 21. With the Boss Hogg Outlawz, Slim Thug released three albums, Boyz N Blue (2004), Serve & Collect (2007) and Back by Blockular Demand: Serve & Collect II (2008). He left Star Trak and Interscope Records in 2008.

=== Boss of All Bosses (2009) ===
Slim Thug's second solo album Boss of All Bosses was released in 2009. Although not as successful as his debut album, Boss of All Bosses debuted at #15 on the Billboard 200 with 32,000 copies sold in the first week released. It included the single "I Run".

=== Tha Thug Show (2010–present) ===
Slim Thug's third studio album Tha Thug Show. His first single was "Gangsta" which featured Z-Ro. His second single featured rapper/singer B.o.B entitled "So High". It was released November 30, 2010. On April 23, 2013, he released a new EP titled Welcome to Texas EP featuring guest appearances from Rick Ross, Pimp C and Ludacris among others.

In March 2020, Slim Thug released his album Thug Life, and he announced that he had tested positive for COVID-19.

== Personal life ==
According to MTV News, Lupe Fiasco's video for "Hip Hop Saved My Life" was based on Slim Thug's life story.

According to The Augusta Chronicle, Slim Thug is a cousin of Women's National Basketball League player Brittney Griner.

On June 7, 2010, Vibe released controversial statements Slim Thug had made regarding treatment of black men by black and white women saying "it's hard to find [a successful black man] so Black women have to bow down and let it be known that they gotta start working hard; they gotta start cooking and being down for they man more. ...White women treat they man like a king." The article elicited varied reactions from bloggers and online commentators. Cultural critic and Columbia University professor Marc Lamont Hill and singers Aubrey O'Day, D. Woods, and rapper Talib Kweli have all responded publicly to his comments.

Slim Thug is 6 ft 6 in (198 cm) tall. His hobbies include running, which he credited with improving his health and contributing to his weight loss.

He supported Kamala Harris' 2024 presidential campaign.

== Discography ==
Studio albums

- Already Platinum (2005)
- Boss of All Bosses (2009)
- Tha Thug Show (2010)
- Boss Life (2013)
- Hogg Life: The Beginning (2015)
- Hogg Life, Vol. 2: Still Surviving (2015)
- Hogg Life, Vol. 3: Hustler of the Year (2015)
- Hogg Life, Vol. 4: American King (2016)
- Welcome 2 Houston (2017)
- The World Is Yours (2017)
- Suga Daddy Slim: On tha Prowl (2019)
- Thug Life (2020)
- BIGslim (2022)
- Midlife Crisis (2023)

== Awards and nominations ==
MTV Video Music Awards

Year	Nominated work	Award	Result
2005	"Still Tippin'"	MTV2 Award	Nominated
2006	"Check On It"	Best R&B Video	Won
