= Return of the Trill =

Studio album by Bun B
- Released: August 31, 2018
- Genre: Hip-hop
- Length: 57:27
- Label: II Trill; Double Dose; Empire
- Producer: B. Barber; BeatKing; Big E; Big K.R.I.T.; Cory Mo; El-P; Kevon Harrold; Oktober1st; Sama'an Ashrawi; Wilder Zoby

Bun B chronology
Trill OG: The Epilogue (2013)	Return of the Trill (2018)	TrillStatik (2019)

Singles from Return of the Trill
- 1. "Knowhatimsayin'" Released: March 6, 2018; 2. "Recognize" Released: August 17, 2018

Professional ratings
Review scores
Source	Rating
HipHopDX	4/5
Pitchfork	7.8/10
RapReviews	8/10
Rolling Stone	3.5/5 stars

Return of the Trill is the fifth solo studio album by American rapper Bun B. It was released on August 31, 2018, via II Trill Enterprises, Double Dose Entertainment and Empire Distribution. Production was handled by Big K.R.I.T., Big E, B. Barber, BeatKing, Cory Mo, El-P, Kevon Harrold, Mannie Fresh and Oktober 1st, with additional producers Sama'an Ashrawi and Wilder Zoby. It features guest appearances from Big K.R.I.T., 2 Chainz, 8Ball & MJG, BeatKing, Giggs, Killa Kyleon, Leon Bridges, Lil' Keke, Lil' Wayne, Run the Jewels, Slim Thug, T.I., Yo Gotti, Gary Clark Jr., and the late Pimp C, with contributions from Classik Mussik, Dedrick "Dee-Rick" Taylor and Yung Huey.

The album peaked at number 150 on the Billboard 200 and number 9 on the Independent Albums charts in the United States.

== Track listing ==
No.	Title	Producer(s)	Length
1.	"Trill Over Everything" (featuring Killa Kyleon)	Big K.R.I.T.	4:34
2.	"Recognize" (featuring T.I. & Big K.R.I.T.)	Big K.R.I.T.	3:02
3.	"KnoWhatImSayin" (featuring Slim Thug & Lil' Keke)	Big E	3:52
4.	"Outta Season" (featuring Big K.R.I.T.)	Big K.R.I.T.	4:17
5.	"Trap Hands" (featuring 2 Chainz & Yo Gotti)	Mannie Fresh	4:19
6.	"Blood on the Dash" (featuring Gary Clark Jr.)	Big K.R.I.T.; Sama'an Ashrawi (add.)	4:16
7.	"Myself" (featuring Run the Jewels)	El-P; Wilder Zoby (add.)	4:11
8.	"Rude Boi" (featuring Lil Wayne)	Oktober1st	4:04
9.	"Hoes from da Hood" (featuring BeatKing)	BeatKing	3:36
10.	"Slow It Down"	Big K.R.I.T.	3:29
11.	"Never Going Back" (featuring Giggs)	B. Barber	4:39
12.	"U a Bitch" (featuring Pimp C)	Cory Mo	4:23
13.	"Grow Up" (featuring 8Ball & MJG)	Big E	3:51
14.	"Gone Away" (featuring Leon Bridges & Gary Clark Jr.)	Big K.R.I.T.; Kevon Harrold; Sama'an Ashrawi (add.)	4:54
Total length:			57:27

== Personnel ==
- Bernard "Bun B" Freeman – vocals, co-executive producer
- Kyle "Killa Kyleon" Riley – vocals (track 1)
- Clifford "T.I." Harris – vocals (track 2)
- Justin "Big K.R.I.T." Scott – vocals (tracks: 2, 4), producer (tracks: 1, 2, 4, 6, 10, 14), executive producer
- Stayve "Slim Thug" Thomas – vocals (track 3)
- Marcus "Lil' Keke" Edwards – vocals (track 3)
- Tauheed "2 Chainz" Epps – vocals (track 5)
- Mario "Yo Gotti" Mims – vocals (track 5)
- Gary Clark Jr. – guitar (tracks: 6, 14)
- Jaime "El-P" Meline – vocals & producer (track 7)
- Michael "Killer Mike" Render – vocals (track 7)
- Dwayne "Lil' Wayne" Carter – vocals (track 8)
- Classik Mussik – additional vocals (track 8)
- Justin "BeatKing" Riley – vocals & producer (track 9)
- Nathaniel "Giggs" Thompson – vocals (track 11)
- Dedrick "Dee-Rick" Taylor – additional vocals (track 11)
- Chad "Pimp C" Butler – vocals (track 12)
- Premro "8Ball" Smith – vocals (track 13)
- Marlon "MJG" Goodwin – vocals (track 13)
- Yung Huey – additional vocals (track 13)
- Todd Michael "Leon" Bridges – vocals (track 14)
- Elimu Tamani "Big E" Tabasuri – producer (tracks: 3, 13)
- Byron "Mannie Fresh" Thomas – producer (track 5)
- Sama'an Ashrawi – additional producer (tracks: 6, 14)
- Wilder Zoby – additional producer (track 7)
- Oktober 1st – producer (track 8)
- B. Barber – producer (track 11)
- Cory Moore – producer (track 12)
- Kevon Harrold – producer (track 14)
- Micah Wyatt – mixing
- Bob Boyd – mastering
- Angela "Queenie" Freeman – executive producer
- Anzel Jennings – co-executive producer
- Trevor Piper – design
- Edgar L. Walker Jr. – photography

== Charts ==
Chart (2018)	Peak position
US Billboard 200	150
US Independent Albums (Billboard)	9
