= Sweeter (disambiguation) =

Sweeter is a comparative form of sweet.

Sweeter may also refer to:

- Sweeter (album), a 2011 album by Gavin DeGraw
  - Sweeter (Gavin DeGraw song), the title track from the album
- "Sweeter" (Leon Bridges song), a 2020 song from the Leon Bridges album Gold-Diggers Sound

== See also ==
- A Sweeter Song, a 1976 Canadian comedy film directed by Allan Eastman
- "Sweeter and Sweeter", a song written by Don Reid and Harold Reid, and recorded by The Statler Brothers in 1985
