= Beyond (Leon Bridges song) =

2018 single by Leon Bridges

Single by Leon Bridges

from the album Good Thing
- Released: April 20, 2018
- Studio: Elysian Park (Los Angeles); Setting Sun (Twentynine Palms)
- Genre: R&B; country
- Length: 4:00
- Label: Columbia Records
- Songwriters: Todd Bridges; Eric Frederic; Nate Mercereau; Justin Tranter; Austin Michael Jenkins; Joshua Block
- Producers: Ricky Reed; Nate Mercereau

Leon Bridges singles chronology
"Bet Ain't Worth the Hand" / "Bad Bad News" (2018)	"Beyond" (2018)	"That Was Yesterday" (2019)

Music videos
- "Beyond" on YouTube
- "Beyond (Acoustic)" on YouTube
- "Beyond (Vibe Tape Mix)" on YouTube

"Beyond" is a song by American singer-songwriter Leon Bridges from his second studio album, Good Thing (2018). The song was released as a single on April 20 of the same year. An R&B and country love song with musical elements inspired by Ginuwine and Van Morrison, it features Bridges singing about the possibility of the woman he loves being his soulmate over an acoustic guitar, percussion, and a bass-driven beat. Critics received the song positively, praising its sound, production, and Bridges' vocals, and it was later ranked number 38 on PopMatters' 60 Best Songs of 2018. On May 31, 2018, Bridges released the accompanying music video, which centers on a romance between Bridges and a woman in El Paso, Texas.

In June 2018, Bridges performed "Beyond" with country singer Luke Combs on CMT Crossroads; Bridges would officially release a version of the song featuring Combs in September of the same year. Other versions consist of an acoustic version and a remix. In October 2025, Dua Lipa brought out Bridges at the Dallas concert of her Radical Optimism Tour where they performed the song together.

== Background and composition ==
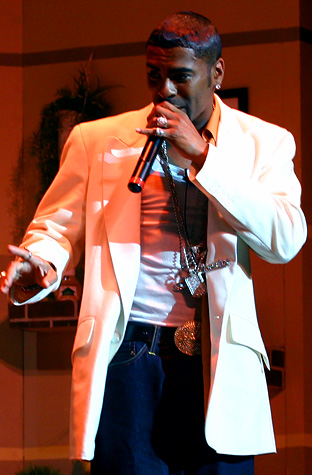
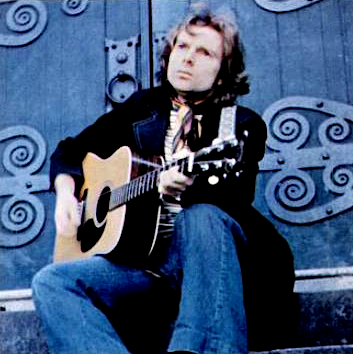
Ginuwine (left) and Van Morrison (right) inspired musical elements of "Beyond".

After Bridges explored 1960s soul music in his debut album Coming Home, he ventured to other retro musical styles with the first two singles to his 2018 follow-up, Good Thing, such as the jazz with a 'hip-hop pulse' heard in "Bad Bad News". Bridges intended with the album to take his sound into a "more modern R&B direction". On April 20, 2018, Bridges released the single "Beyond", a track in which he aimed to infuse R&B with a "country twang", the type of genre fusion which Bridges stated he loves incorporating to make a song as "fresh" as he can. Accompanied by an acoustic guitar inspired by Van Morrison, "throwback percussion", and a modern "bass-heavy beat", Bridges sings a contemplation of "romantic destiny" in an R&B melody that draws from Ginuwine. The song's lyrics represent a conversation Bridges has with his mother. Bridges talks about the possibility of his partner being his soulmate with "all the exhilaration and terror that proposition entails", but despite the signs pointing to its likelihood, Bridges still hesitates to state it. The song "gradually crescendoes", leading to a climax of "falsetto swoops" and stacked background vocals.

When writing lyrics, Bridges stated he aims to respect the female subject of the song rather than objectify her, further telling Relix the song and its respective album is about appreciating a woman as a person. He wanted to create a "direct poetry" that connected with people. The singer wrote "Beyond" after being inspired by a woman he was in a casual relationship with who had told him she loved him, when no other woman had told him the same.

== Reception ==
Critics received the song positively. Chris DeVille of Stereogum stated "Beyond" was a "dreamy tune", with drum programming "so organic-sounding you might not notice it's drum programming". He further described the track as "gentle and pretty", writing that it sounded like a classic without completely venturing to a retro style. Adreon Patterson of Paste called the track's production "heartwarming", which he stated Bridges' soulful vocals fit suitably. Zachary Hoskins of Slant Magazine stated that "Beyond" was an effortless integration of country and soul. Olivia Horn of Pitchfork called it a "standout single".

PopMatters ranked the song number 38 on their list of the 60 Best Songs of 2018. Jeff Strowe stated Bridges "brought to life the agony and the ecstasy of falling in love", and that with the modern arrangement resembling Motown sound, "these tribulations have never sounded better."

On the United States Billboard charts, "Beyond" peaked at number two (Adult Alternative Airplay), 19 (Adult Pop Airplay and Adult R&B Songs), 21 (Hot R&B Songs), and 38 (Rock & Alternative Airplay). Multi-platinum certifications have been issued for the song; double in Australia and the US, and triple in New Zealand.

== Music video and promotion ==
Bridges released a music video for "Beyond" on May 31, 2018. The video is set in El Paso, Texas, and depicts a "retro romance" where Bridges and a woman gradually become closer. The couple laugh over dinner, drink, walk through markets, and dance at a diner, with the video showing "picturesque footage" of the two in various El Paso locations.

On June 28, 2018, Bridges performed "Beyond" with country singer Luke Combs in an episode of CMT Crossroads. While the two sang portions of the song together, Combs provided "some surprisingly soulful fills between lines". On December 6, Bridges performed the song on the Late Late Show with James Corden. Joined by a live band and background vocalists, Bridges danced to the song and concluded the performance with a succession of falsetto runs, which Shelby Reitman of Billboard described as impressive. Seven years later, on October 1, 2025, Dua Lipa brought out Bridges at the Dallas concert of her Radical Optimism Tour, where they performed "Beyond" together. Before Lipa invited Bridges onstage, she called him "one of the most beautiful voices of our generation".

== Other versions ==
In August 2018, Bridges released an acoustic version of "Beyond" featuring a live band, and a remix dubbed the "Vibe Tape Mix". A month later in September, Bridges officially released a live version of "Beyond" with Combs which features the two harmonizing. Jeff Gage of Rolling Stone described their harmonies as "almost seamless" and complementing their voices' "rich, smoky textures". Bridges and Combs excitedly talked about their collaboration, with Bridges describing Combs' involvement as having "brought so much" to the song.

== Credits and personnel ==
Credits are adapted from the liner notes of Good Thing. The song was recorded at Elysian Park (Los Angeles, California) and House Of The Setting Sun (Twentynine Palms, California).

- Todd Bridges – songwriting
- Eric Frederic – songwriting
- Nate Mercereau – songwriting, production, engineering, drums, bass, guitar, organ, Wurlitzer, percussion
- Justin Tranter – songwriting
- Austin Michael Jenkins – songwriting
- Joshua Block – songwriting
- Ricky Reed – production
- Ethan Shumaker – engineering

== Charts ==
Weekly chart performance for "Beyond"
Chart (2018)	Peak position
US Adult Pop Airplay (Billboard)	19
US Rock & Alternative Airplay (Billboard)	38
US Hot R&B Songs (Billboard)	21
US Adult Alternative Airplay (Billboard)	2
US Adult R&B Songs (Billboard)	19

== Certifications ==
Certifications for "Beyond"
Region	Certification	Certified units/sales
Australia (ARIA)	2× Platinum	140,000^{‡}
Brazil (Pro-Música Brasil)	Platinum	40,000^{‡}
Canada (Music Canada)	Platinum	80,000^{‡}
Denmark (IFPI Danmark)	Gold	45,000^{‡}
New Zealand (RMNZ)	3× Platinum	90,000^{‡}
United Kingdom (BPI)	Gold	400,000^{‡}
United States (RIAA)	2× Platinum	2,000,000^{‡}
Streaming
Sweden (GLF)	Gold	4,000,000^{†}
^{‡} Sales+streaming figures based on certification alone.^{†} Streaming-only figures based on certification alone.
