= Gold-Diggers Sound =

Studio album by Leon Bridges
- Released: July 23, 2021
- Studios: Beachwave Sound (North Hollywood); Brooklyn Recording (Brooklyn); Gold-Diggers Sound (East Hollywood); Niles City Sound (Fort Worth)
- Genres: Progressive R&B; alternative R&B
- Length: 36:41
- Label: Columbia
- Producers: 9AM; DJ Stanfill; King Garbage; Nate Mercereau; Ricky Reed; Robert Glasper

Leon Bridges chronology
Good Thing (2018)	Gold-Diggers Sound (2021)	Leon (2024)

Singles from Gold-Diggers Sound
- 1. "Sweeter" Released: June 8, 2020; 2. "Motorbike" Released: May 14, 2021; 3. "Why Don't You Touch Me" Released: June 17, 2021

Gold-Diggers Sound is the third studio album by American singer Leon Bridges. It was released on July 23, 2021, by Columbia Records. The album features guest appearances from Robert Glasper, Terrace Martin, and INK.

The album received widespread acclaim from critics and debuted at number 17 on the US Billboard 200. It was supported by three singles: "Sweeter", "Motorbike", and "Why Don't You Touch Me". It received a nomination for Best R&B Album at the 64th Annual Grammy Awards.

== Background and release ==
The album's title is derived from the "studio, hotel and bar/speakeasy" of the same name located in East Hollywood, where Bridges lived while writing and recording the songs on the album. Bridges held a Grammys party at Gold-Diggers in 2019 and later started a residency at the hotel, bringing in musicians to collaborate with. He started by writing melodies and lyrics over their improvisations. He did not have a planned concept for most of the album's songs, but a few of the tracks did. For example, "Magnolias" is inspired by the music of Sade. However, Bridges made the conscious decision to distance himself from the sound of his debut album, Coming Home (2015), and his second album, Good Thing (2018), instead opting for an "unpredictable" approach.

On June 8, 2020, Bridges and Terrace Martin released a single titled "Sweeter" in response to the May 25 murder of George Floyd. The narrator of the song is a dead man whose mother and siblings weep over him. Gold-Diggers Sound was announced May 14, 2021, alongside the album's lead single, "Motorbike". A music video for "Motorbike", directed by Anderson .Paak, was released the same day. The album's second single, "Why Don't You Touch Me", was released on June 17, 2021. The first part of a music video for "Why Don't You Touch Me" premiered the following day on June 18, 2021; the second part was released on June 24, 2021.

== Critical reception ==
Professional ratings
Aggregate scores
Source	Rating
AnyDecentMusic?	7.5/10
Metacritic	81/100
Review scores
Source	Rating
AllMusic	3.5/5 stars
Clash	9/10
DIY	4/5 stars
Exclaim!	7/10
The Independent	4/5 stars
NME	4/5 stars
The Observer	5/5 stars
Pitchfork	7.0/10
Rolling Stone	4/5 stars
Uncut	7/10

Gold-Diggers Sound was met with widespread critical acclaim. At Metacritic, which assigns a normalized rating out of 100 to reviews from professional publications, the album received an average score of 81, based on 12 reviews. Aggregator AnyDecentMusic? gave it 7.5 out of 10, based on their assessment of the critical consensus.

Writing for The Guardian, Max Bell hailed Gold-Diggers Sound as "a remarkable and progressive R&B album" and observed "the most eclectic compositions of Bridges' career, as well as his most emotionally transparent songwriting". Lucy Wynne from Gigwise applauded Bridges' transition from the "swinging sixties" style of his first album to this album's "progressive R&B", noting its "modern alternative R&B jams with a pop twist". Will Lavin of NME wrote that the album "maintains the traditional elements of old-school soul heard on his previous work but introduces a new, vibrant, almost luminous aesthetic, comparable to the likes of Snoh Aalegra and Brent Faiyaz." Emma Harrison of Clash praised the album's production and the strength of Bridges's songwriting. Julyssa Lopez of The New Yorker wrote that the album's songs "show that Bridges is versatile enough to stretch his skills across multiple eras, even if they never approach the future." Similarly, Pitchfork journalist Jonah Bromwich deemed it "a smooth, risk-averse R&B album whose nostalgic trappings aim for timelessness". Will Strickson from DIY enjoyed the album, saying, "While more of a slow burn than his previous efforts, Gold-Diggers Sound sees Leon Bridges shine brighter as a songwriter, as an artist and as a man than ever".

Reviewing the album for The Independent, Annabel Nugent stated, "The record is a confident immersion into a genre he's only toyed with before. And just as Good Thing never fully sacrificed Bridges' style, neither does Gold-Digger forget his roots". AllMusic critic Andy Kellman said, "Only on a couple occasions does Bridges let loose a touch while in the moment. ... Even in those moments, there is never an indication that Bridges could possibly lose his composure. The unswerving self-control he has demonstrated across three albums both impresses and mystifies". In a lukewarm review, Exclaim!'s Luke Fox wrote, "Bridges loves a good love song, and nails a few here".

=== Industry awards ===
Awards and nominations for Gold-Diggers Sound
Year	Ceremony	Category	Result	Ref.
2022	Grammy Awards	Best R&B Album	Nominated	

== Track listing ==
Gold-Diggers Sound track listing
No.	Title	Writer(s)	Producer(s)	Length
1.	"Born Again" (featuring Robert Glasper)	Todd Bridges; Eric Frederic; Robert Glasper; Daniel Stanfill	Ricky Reed; Nate Mercereau; Glasper; Josh Block^{[a]}	3:43
2.	"Motorbike"	Bridges; Frederic; Paris Strother; Dan Wilson; Nate Mercereau	Reed; Mercereau	3:08
3.	"Steam"	Bridges; Frederic; Mercereau; Justin Tranter; Trevor Lawrence; Antoine Katz; Jordan Blackmon; Atia Boggs	Reed; Mercereau; Steve Wyreman^{[a]}	3:23
4.	"Why Don't You Touch Me"	Bridges; Kim "Kaydence" Krysiuk; Frederic; Jeff Baranowski; Luke Milano	Reed; Mercereau; 9AM; King Garbage^{[b]}; Mike Blankenship^{[b]}; Josh Block^{[a]}	3:17
5.	"Magnolias"	Bridges; Frederic; Mercereau; Steven Cheung; Rome Castille; Michael Neil; Steve Wyreman; Boggs	Reed; Mercereau; Wyreman^{[a]}	3:22
6.	"Gold-Diggers (Junior's Fanfare)"	Lemar Guillary	Reed; Mercereau; Lemar Guillary^{[a]}	0:41
7.	"Details"	Bridges; Frederic; Mercereau; Amber Strother	Reed; Mercereau; King Garbage; Wyreman^{[a]}	3:16
8.	"Sho Nuff"	Bridges; Frederic; Mercereau; Wyreman; Boggs; Ian Fitchuk; Daniel Tashian; Austin Jenkins; Castille	Reed; Mercereau; Wyreman^{[a]}	3:07
9.	"Sweeter" (featuring Terrace Martin)	Bridges; Terrace Martin; Frederic; Wilson; Castille; Mercereau; Zach Cooper; Vic Dimotsis	Reed; Mercereau	2:48
10.	"Don't Worry" (featuring INK)	Bridges; Frederic; Mercereau; Wyreman; Boggs; Josh Crumbly; Amber Strother	Reed; Mercereau; Wyreman^{[a]}	6:41
11.	"Blue Mesas"	Bridges; Frederic; Stanfill; Harold Lilly; Olivia Salas	Reed; Mercereau; DJ Stanfill	3:15
Total length:				36:41

Deluxe bonus track
No.	Title	Writer(s)	Producer(s)	Length
12.	"Summer Rain" (featuring Jazmine Sullivan)	Bridges; Frederic; Wilson; Lilly; Jazmine Sullivan; Mercereau; T. Bridges; Cooper; Dimotsis	Reed; Mercereau; King Garbage	2:44
Total length:				39:30

Notes

- ^{^[a]} signifies a co-producer
- ^{^[b]} signifies an additional producer

== Personnel ==
Credits adapted from the liner notes of Gold-Diggers Sound.

Musicians

- Nate Mercereau – guitar (tracks 1–3, 5, 7–10), guitar synthesizer (track 1), French horn (track 1), drums (tracks 2, 7, 10), bass (tracks 2–4, 8–10), synthesizer (tracks 2, 3), piano (tracks 2, 5, 7), percussion (tracks 3, 10), keyboards (track 4), programming (track 7), sitar guitar (track 10)
- Ricky Reed – drum programming (tracks 2, 8, 9), programming (tracks 4, 5, 7), drums (tracks 5, 7, 8)
- Steve Wyreman – guitar (tracks 4, 5, 8, 10, 11), sitar guitar (track 7), organ (track 8), percussion (track 10), organ (track 10)
- Robert Glasper – keyboards (track 1), bass (track 1)
- Keyon Harrold – trumpet (tracks 1, 6, 10), flugelhorn (track 10)
- Terrace Martin – saxophone (tracks 1, 6, 9, 10), piano (track 9), alto saxophone (track 10)
- Paris Strother – synthesizer (tracks 2, 7), piano (track 2)
- INK – vocals (tracks 3, 5, 8, 10)
- Amber Strother – vocals (tracks 3, 8, 10)
- Lemar Guillary – trombone (tracks 5–7, 10), horn arrangement (track 1)
- Antoine Katz – bass (track 3)
- Jordan Blackmon – sound effects (track 3)
- 9AM – programming (track 4)
- Mike Blankenship – keyboards (track 4)
- Zach Cooper – bass (tracks 5, 7)
- Josh Johnson – alto saxophone (tracks 5, 7)
- Cameron Johnson – trumpet (tracks 5, 7), flugelhorn (tracks 5, 7)
- Carlos Niño – percussion (tracks 10, 11)
- Josh Crumbly – piano (track 10), synthesizer (track 10), upright bass (track 11)
- Olivia Salas – strings (track 11), cello (track 11)
- DJ Stanfill – percussion (track 11), drums (track 11), piano (track 11), electric piano (track 11), synthesizer (track 11), background vocals (track 11)

Technical

- Leon Bridges – executive production
- Ricky Reed – executive production, mixing (tracks 5–9, 11)
- Josh Block – engineering (tracks 1, 4)
- Jon Castelli – mixing (tracks 1–4, 10)
- John Deguzman – engineer for mix (tracks 1–4, 10)
- Brian DiMao – engineering (track 1)
- Andy Taub – engineering (track 1)
- Luke Milano – engineering (track 4)
- Bill Malina – engineering (tracks 2, 3, 5–11)
- Ethan Shumaker – engineering (tracks 2, 3, 5–11)
- James Kirk – assistant engineering (tracks 2, 3, 5–11)
- Jonathan Thompson – assistant engineering (tracks 2, 3, 5–11)
- Daddy Kev – mastering

Artwork

- Justin Hardiman – front cover photograph, back cover photograph
- Cedrick Jones – photography
- Dustin McLaughlin – photography
- Joe Greer – photography
- Cory Gehr – photography
- Tina Ibañez – art direction, design

== Charts ==
Chart performance for Gold-Diggers Sound
Chart (2021)	Peak position
Australian Albums (ARIA)	25
Belgian Albums (Ultratop Flanders)	22
Belgian Albums (Ultratop Wallonia)	115
Canadian Albums (Billboard)	51
Dutch Albums (Album Top 100)	17
German Albums (Offizielle Top 100)	81
New Zealand Albums (RMNZ)	31
Scottish Albums (Official Charts)	57
Swiss Albums (Schweizer Hitparade)	51
UK Albums (Official Charts)	93
UK R&B Albums (Official Charts)	4
US Billboard 200	17
