= Astroworld =

Astroworld may refer to:

- Six Flags AstroWorld, a former theme park in Houston, Texas, U.S.
- Astroworld (album), a 2018 album by American rapper Travis Scott named after the theme park
- Astroworld Festival, an annual music festival organized by Scott and held adjacent to the theme park site
  - Astroworld Festival crowd crush, a 2021 crowd crush incident, which resulted in the deaths of 10 people
- Astroworld, a 2013 album by BeatKing
  - Astroworld 2, a 2017 album by BeatKing
