= Leon (Leon Bridges album) =

Studio album by Leon Bridges
- Released: October 4, 2024
- Recorded: 2023
- Studios: El Desierto Casa (Mexico City); Castle Ridge (Houston); Moxe (Nashville); Southern Ground (Nashville)
- Genres: Country; soul; folk
- Length: 43:37
- Label: Columbia
- Producers: Ian Fitchuk; Daniel Tashian

Leon Bridges chronology
Gold-Diggers Sound (2021)	Leon (2024)	Happiness Anytime (2026)

Singles from Leon
- 1. "Peaceful Place" Released: August 8, 2024; 2. "Laredo" Released: September 5, 2024; 3. "That's What I Love" Released: September 27, 2024

Leon is the fourth studio album by American singer Leon Bridges. It was released on October 4, 2024, by Columbia Records. Centered around his upbringing in Fort Worth, Texas, he primarily recorded the album in Mexico City and worked with producers Ian Fitchuk and Daniel Tashian. The album was preceded by three singles: "Peaceful Place", "Laredo", and "That's What I Love". It received generally positive reviews from music critics.

== Composition and recording ==
Leon Bridges wrote the album about his experience growing up in Fort Worth, Texas, whose music scene he credited with inspiring the folk and country music influences on the album. Several songs on Leon were written during the production of his 2021 album Gold-Diggers Sound. He spent "almost five years" working on the album in Los Angeles and Nashville before moving production to Mexico City, where he spent the last few months of 2023 recording the album at El Desierto studio. During a session in Los Angeles, Bridges began streaming on Instagram Live and was contacted by American musician John Mayer, who invited Bridges to his studio where they collaborated on "When a Man Cries".

Bridges cited Roy C and Van Morrison (specifically his 1968 album Astral Weeks) as influences on the album's sound and lyricism.

== Critical reception ==
Professional ratings
Aggregate scores
Source	Rating
Metacritic	80/100
Review scores
Source	Rating
AllMusic	4/5 stars
Clash	9/10
DIY	4/5 stars
Far Out	4.5/5 stars
Mojo	4/5 stars
The Observer	5/5 stars
Pitchfork	6.7/10
Rolling Stone	3/5 stars
Uncut	8/10

Leon received generally positive reviews from music critics. At Metacritic, which assigns a normalized rating out of 100 to reviews from mainstream critics, the album received an average score of 80, based on 10 reviews.

Writing for Uncut, Stephen Deusner called Bridges an "ambitious, yet idiosyncratic artist" and praised the lyricism and storytelling on the album, specifically on "Panther City". Mojo's Tom Doyle said that "Bridges' vocal talents continue to shine", also highlighting "Panther City" for its lyrics and "'70s Isley Brothers-styled" sound.

In a review for Pitchfork, Stephen Thomas Erlewine complimented the "loving care that Bridges, [Ian] Fitchuk, and [Daniel] Tashian bring to Leon", but criticized the production and mixing for causing the album to "feel curiously frictionless". Rolling Stone's Julyssa Lopez praised the "emotional weight and personal intimacy" of the music, though she found "[s]ome of the album's more general love songs ... less intriguing".

== Track listing ==
Leon track listing
No.	Title	Writer(s)	Length
1.	"When a Man Cries"	Todd Bridges; Ian Fitchuk; Daniel Tashian; Joshua Moore; Eric Frederic; John Mayer; Tom Peyton; Nate Mercereau; Brandon Marcel	3:51
2.	"That's What I Love"	T. Bridges; Fitchuk; Tashian; Moore; Austin Jenkins	3:46
3.	"Laredo"	T. Bridges; Fitchuk; Tashian	3:16
4.	"Panther City"	T. Bridges; Fitchuk; Tashian; Jenkins; Moore	4:07
5.	"Ain't Got Nothing on You"	T. Bridges; Luke Laird; Ben West	3:26
6.	"Simplify"	T. Bridges; Ilsey Juber; Tyler Johnson; Dylan Wiggins; Michael Uzowuru; Marcel; Jerome Castille; Josh Block; Chris Vivion; Jenkins	3:51
7.	"Teddy's Tune"	T. Bridges; Nick Bockrath; Moore	0:53
8.	"Never Satisfied"	T. Bridges; Fitchuk; Tashian; Jenkins; Moore	3:50
9.	"Peaceful Place"	T. Bridges; Fitchuk; Tashian; Jenkins	4:15
10.	"Can't Have It All"	T. Bridges; Laird; West; Castille	2:40
11.	"Ivy"	T. Bridges; Marcel; Johnson; Abraham Alexander	3:13
12.	"Ghetto Honeybee"	T. Bridges; Fitchuk; Natalie Hemby; Jenkins	3:55
13.	"God Loves Everyone"	T. Bridges; Fitchuk; Tashian; Jenkins; Moore	2:34
Total length:			43:37

== Personnel ==
Musicians

- Leon Bridges – vocals (all tracks), electric guitar (track 1), acoustic guitar (7), background vocals (10, 11)
- Ian Fitchuk – acoustic guitar (tracks 1–6, 8–12), drums (1–5, 8–10, 12), bass (1–4, 8–10), percussion (1, 4, 8, 9, 12), piano (1, 10, 12), electric guitar (3, 4, 9), keyboards (8), nylon guitar (11)
- Joshua Moore – synthesizer (tracks 1, 2, 4, 8), Mellotron (1, 8), programming (1), piano (2–4, 6–8, 11–13), background vocals (2, 4, 9–12), keyboards (3), drum programming (4), Rhodes (5, 6, 9), bass (5, 6, 12), Hammond organ (5, 8, 10, 12), synth bass (6, 11); bells, marimba (6); percussion (8, 9, 12), acoustic guitar (8), electric guitar (9), pipe organ (11)
- Santiago Mijares – guacharaca, maracas, woodblock (track 1); percussion, bongos, palmas, campana (9)
- Nick Bockrath – electric guitar (tracks 2, 3, 5, 6, 8, 9, 11), nylon guitar (3, 6), baritone guitar (5), acoustic guitar (7), background vocals (10), banjo (11)
- Daniel Tashian – electric guitar (tracks 2, 4, 9), keyboards (2, 4), acoustic guitar (4, 12), synthesizer (8), background vocals (9, 12), Rhodes (9)
- Avery Bright – violin (tracks 2, 13)
- Kristin Weber – violin (tracks 2, 13)
- Matt Combs – violin (tracks 2, 13)
- Zach Casebolt – violin (tracks 2, 13)
- Betsy Lamb – viola (tracks 2, 13)
- Cassie Shudak – viola (tracks 2, 13)
- Austin Hoke – cello (tracks 2, 13)
- Madeline Edwards – background vocals (track 2)
- Jim Hoke – flute (track 3)
- Brandon Marcel – background vocals (tracks 4, 6, 9–11)
- Xeus Hamilton – background vocals (tracks 4, 10)
- Ilsey Juber – background vocals (track 6)
- Drew Taubenfeld – pedal steel (tracks 6, 9)
- Natalie Hemby – background vocals (track 12)

Technical

- Ian Fitchuk – production
- Daniel Tashian – production (tracks 2, 4, 9, 13)
- Tyler Johnson – production (track 11)
- Joshua Moore – additional production, vocal production (tracks 1–6, 8–13); mixing (12), additional recording (1, 3, 4, 8, 9, 12)
- Greg Calbi – mastering
- Steve Fallone – mastering
- Konrad Snyder – mixing (tracks 1–11, 13), recording (all tracks)
- Daniel Bitran Azripe – recording
- Israel Rodríguez – recording
- JC Vertti – recording
- Justin Francis – additional recording (tracks 2, 12, 13), initial recording (2, 9)
- Zack Pancoast – initial recording (tracks 4, 13)
- Dan Davis – additional recording assistance (tracks 2, 12, 13)

Visuals

- Chris Black – creative direction
- Jack Bool – photography
- Oliver Shaw – design, art direction

== Charts ==
Chart performance for Leon
Chart (2024)	Peak position
Australian Albums (ARIA)	85
Belgian Albums (Ultratop Flanders)	65
Dutch Albums (Album Top 100)	37
New Zealand Albums (RMNZ)	38
UK Albums (Official Charts)	70
US Billboard 200	58
US Top R&B/Hip-Hop Albums (Billboard)	19
