= Happiness Anytime =

Studio album by Leon Bridges
- Released: September 25, 2026
- Recorded: April 2025
- Studio: Chaplin (Los Angeles)
- Length: 37:36
- Label: Columbia
- Producers: J Lloyd; Lydia Kitto

Leon Bridges chronology
Leon (2024)	Happiness Anytime (2026)

Happiness Anytime is the fifth studio album by the American singer-songwriter Leon Bridges. It was released on September 25, 2026, by Columbia Records. The album was co-produced by J Lloyd and Lydia Kitto of the British band Jungle.

== Background and recording ==
Bridges worked on Happiness Anytime over four days in April 2025 at a Los Angeles studio with Jungle members Josh Lloyd-Watson and Lydia Kitto in a studio in Los Angeles after he previously crossed paths with them at various music festivals.

In a press release, Bridges said of the album: "For me, happiness is not a feeling that you chase [...] I want this album to be something that lingers with people and lingers in people’s bones. There’s this feeling that we have to fix the problems of the world; you feel inadequate or it can be debilitating. My role is to be light. I hope that comes across with this album."

== Promotion ==
The album's twelve songs were released in the form of three extended play (EP) installments. The first installment, titled Happiness Anytime: Part 1, was released on July 17, 2026, which included the songs "Light the Way", "Tears of Joy", "Illusion", and "Your Love Is Electric". The second installment, Happiness Anytime: Part 2, was released on August 21, 2026, in which the following songs were released: "Talk It Over", "Happiness Anytime", "All Day, All Night", and "Fly Baby". The remaining four songs, "Watch You Dance", "The Way It Goes", "Take My Hand" and "Please Don't Say Goodbye" were released alongside the full album on September 25, 2026.

== Critical reception ==
On Album of the Year, the album has an average score of 71 out of 100 from nine critic scores. Any Decent Music gave it a weighted average score of 6.6 out of 10 from seven critic scores. According to Metacritic, it received "generally favorable" reviews based on a weighted average score of 74 out of 100 from eight critic scores.

== Track listing ==
All tracks are written by Todd Bridges, Joshua Lloyd-Watson, and Lydia Kitto; "All Day, All Night" written with Abbas Hamad.

Happiness Anytime track listing
No.	Title	Length
1.	"Light the Way"	3:31
2.	"Tears of Joy"	2:42
3.	"Illusion"	3:04
4.	"Your Love Is Electric"	3:42
5.	"Talk It Over"	2:58
6.	"Happiness Anytime"	2:38
7.	"All Day, All Night" (with Lydia Kitto)	4:02
8.	"Fly Baby"	3:02
9.	"Watch You Dance"	2:27
10.	"The Way It Goes"	3:06
11.	"Take My Hand"	3:36
12.	"Please Don't Say Goodbye"	2:48
Total length:		37:36

== Personnel ==
Credits are adapted from the album's liner notes and Tidal.

- Leon Bridges – lead vocals (all tracks), guitar (tracks 2, 11)
- J Lloyd – production, recording, mixing (all tracks); guitar (1–6, 8–12), background vocals (1, 3), bass guitar (1, 4), percussion (10)
- Lydia Kitto – production, background vocals (all tracks); keyboards (1, 4, 5, 11), bass guitar (2–10, 12), guitar (2, 4, 7, 8, 10–12), percussion (3, 4, 8–10), organ (3, 8, 9), flute (6, 12), piano (7, 8), lead vocals (7)
- Ciaran De Chaud – recording assistance, mixing assistance
- Matt Colton – mastering
- Shahar Amdor – tenor saxophone (1, 3, 7), flute (7)
- John Lindsay – saxophone (1, 3, 7)
- Miles Lloyd Thompson – trumpet (1, 3, 7)
- Eric Hagstrom – drums (2, 3, 6, 7, 9–12), percussion (11)
- Xeus Hamilton – background vocals (3)
- Tamuz Dolev – drums (4, 5, 8), percussion (5)
- Pino Palladino – bass guitar (11)
- Joshua Kissi – creative direction, photography
- Inga Kan – art direction, design

== Charts ==
Chart performance for Happiness Anytime
Chart (2026)	Peak position
Australian Albums (ARIA)	12
Australian Hip Hop/R&B Albums (ARIA)	1
Belgian Albums (Ultratop Flanders)	18
Belgian Albums (Ultratop Wallonia)	129
Dutch Albums (Album Top 100)	34
French Physical Albums (SNEP)	67
New Zealand Albums (Recorded Music NZ)	33
Scottish Albums (Official Charts)	29
UK Albums Sales (Official Charts)	27
UK R&B Albums (Official Charts)	3
US Billboard 200	74
