= Then Leave =

2020 single by BeatKing featuring Queendome Come

Single by BeatKing featuring Queendome Come

from the album Gangsta Stripper Music 4
- Released: March 25, 2020
- Length: 2:32
- Label: Columbia
- Songwriters: BeatKing; Queendome Come
- Producer: BeatKing

BeatKing singles chronology
| "Pink Slip" (2020) | "Then Leave" (2020) | "Uncle Club God" (2020) |

Queendom Come singles chronology
| "Queen Birthday Song" (2020) | "Then Leave" (2020) |

Music video
- "Then Leave" on YouTube

"Then Leave" is a song by American rapper and producer BeatKing featuring fellow rapper Queendome Come, released as a single on March 25, 2020, from BeatKing's album Gangsta Stripper Music 4 (2020). In June 2020, the song went viral on video-sharing app TikTok.

== Background ==
"Then Leave" garnered popularity after various choreographed dances were posted on TikTok, based on the user Boujee.Tay's moves. As of July 2020, the song's audio was used in over 151,000 videos. In the midst of the song's growing popularity, Columbia Records removed the song's parent album from streaming services. BeatKing announced, however, a new version of the album would be released "soon".

== Chart performance ==
On the US Rolling Stone Top 100, for the week ending July 2, 2020, the song debuted at number 88, with over four million streams. The song also debuted at number 3 on the Bubbling Under Hot 100.

== Music video ==
The song's official video was released on March 27, 2020, directed by OG Visions. The video's description simply reads "Ratchet Ass Shit".

== Charts ==
| Chart (2020) | Peak position |
|---|---|
| US Bubbling Under Hot 100 (Billboard) | 3 |
| US Hot R&B/Hip-Hop Songs (Billboard) | 48 |
| US Rolling Stone Top 100 | 88 |

== Certifications ==
| Region | Certification | Certified units/sales |
|---|---|---|
| United States (RIAA) | Gold | 500,000^{‡} |
^{‡} Sales+streaming figures based on certification alone.
