= Leon Bridges =

American singer-songwriter (born 1989)

- Bridges performing in 2021

Background information
- Born: Todd Michael Bridges; July 13, 1989 (age 37); Atlanta, Georgia, U.S.
- Origin: Fort Worth, Texas, U.S.
- Genres: Soul; neo soul; R&B
- Occupations: Singer; songwriter; record producer; actor
- Instruments: Vocals; guitar
- Works: Leon Bridges discography
- Years active: 2014–present
- Labels: Columbia; Night Time Stories
- Website: www.leonbridges.com

Todd Michael "Leon" Bridges (born July 13, 1989) is an American singer, songwriter, record producer, and actor. Debuting as a throwback act with 2015's Coming Home, an album reviving 1960s soul music, he has since branched out to other genres reflecting his musical influences like R&B artist Ginuwine and country artist Townes Van Zandt. His second and third albums, Good Thing (2018), wherein Bridges drew from 1980s quiet storm and 1990s neo soul, and Gold-Diggers Sound (2021), with which Bridges did his own take on 1990s and 2000s R&B, earned Grammy nominations for Best R&B Album; the former peaked at number three on the chart while the latter peaked at number 17 and yielded critical acclaim. His 2018 single, "Bet Ain't Worth The Hand", won the Best Traditional R&B Performance at the 61st Annual Grammy Awards. Bridges' fourth album, Leon (2024), was a personal album with folk and country influence. In 2026, Bridges released his fifth album, Happiness Anytime.

Bridges has also acted in films, portraying revolutionary poet Gil Scott-Heron in the 2018 Neil Armstrong biopic First Man and starring as River in the 2023 drama film The Young Wife.

== Early life ==
External image
- A 2011 image of Bridges posing with another student at a college dance concert.

Todd Michael Bridges was born in Atlanta, Georgia, on July 13, 1989, and raised in Fort Worth, Texas. Raised in a religious household with a grandmother who sang in church, Bridges was forbidden to listen to secular music, although he secretly kept an album by Usher, 8701, which his father had bought for him in 2004. Bridges attended Crowley High School, having lived in Crowley. Bridges stated he was bullied by students who told him that he did not fit the mold of what a Black man should be. Later, Bridges attended Tarrant County College, where he considered becoming a choreographer. He took hip-hop dance as a first-year elective course, and later became a member of the Velocity Dance Company and branched out to different styles of dance such as ballet, modern, African, and jazz. Bridges stated he made friendships with LGBTQ people whose "courage and artistry" he became fascinated by, and that dancing prepared him for his music career. Aside from dance, he also spent his time in Tarrant County College on music. He found a "community of musicians" that he performed with, and he learned to play the guitar by playing simple chords to accompany his lyrics. At 18 years old, after his mother's urging to set his life on the right path, Bridges became religious, and joined a Reformed church. He threw away his R&B records, such as 8701 and those by 112, Jodeci, and H-Town. Wanting to write his own take on Christian music, he went through the discography of progressive R&B artists Frank Ocean and Miguel, which Bridges credited as having "shaped [him] in a way". After being convinced by his older brother's friends he met at TCC, he began heading to open mics, where he sang Christian R&B songs he penned, such as his first song titled "Conversion". He first went by the stage name of Lost Child, a name his mother called him when he needed a haircut, but later, having decided he needed a better stage name, went by Leon Bridges, after people told him he looked like the actor Leon Robinson. Bridges hid his singing from his mother and his church friends, as he saw it as a transgression. After seeing one of his favorite groups, Texas Gentlemen, Bridges decided to write a "river song", which ended up being "River".

In 2010, Bridges dropped out of college to support his mother. He had worked as a busser at Rosa’s Café and a dishwasher at Del Frisco's Grille in Fort Worth while also playing open mics until he was signed by Columbia Records in December 2014. It was his song "Lisa Sawyer", written about his mother, that first defined his style. At some point when he got older, he found that church was no longer for him.

== Career ==
=== 2014–2015: Coming Home ===
Bridges began writing and performing 1950s and '60s-style soul music that was described by Austin 360 as "a transmission straight from the heart." He began to attract followers, and his break into the music industry has been attributed to meeting guitarist Austin Jenkins and Joshua Block of White Denim. It was Bridges' performance of "Coming Home" that caught the attention of the two. Bridges worked on his first few tracks with Jenkins and Block as producers. They recorded an album with vintage equipment, using local musicians affiliated with White Denim. Bridges released two demo songs on SoundCloud in late 2014. "Coming Home" received airplay from local radio stations including KKXT. It attracted the attention from several record labels with Bridges eventually signing with Columbia Records in December 2014.

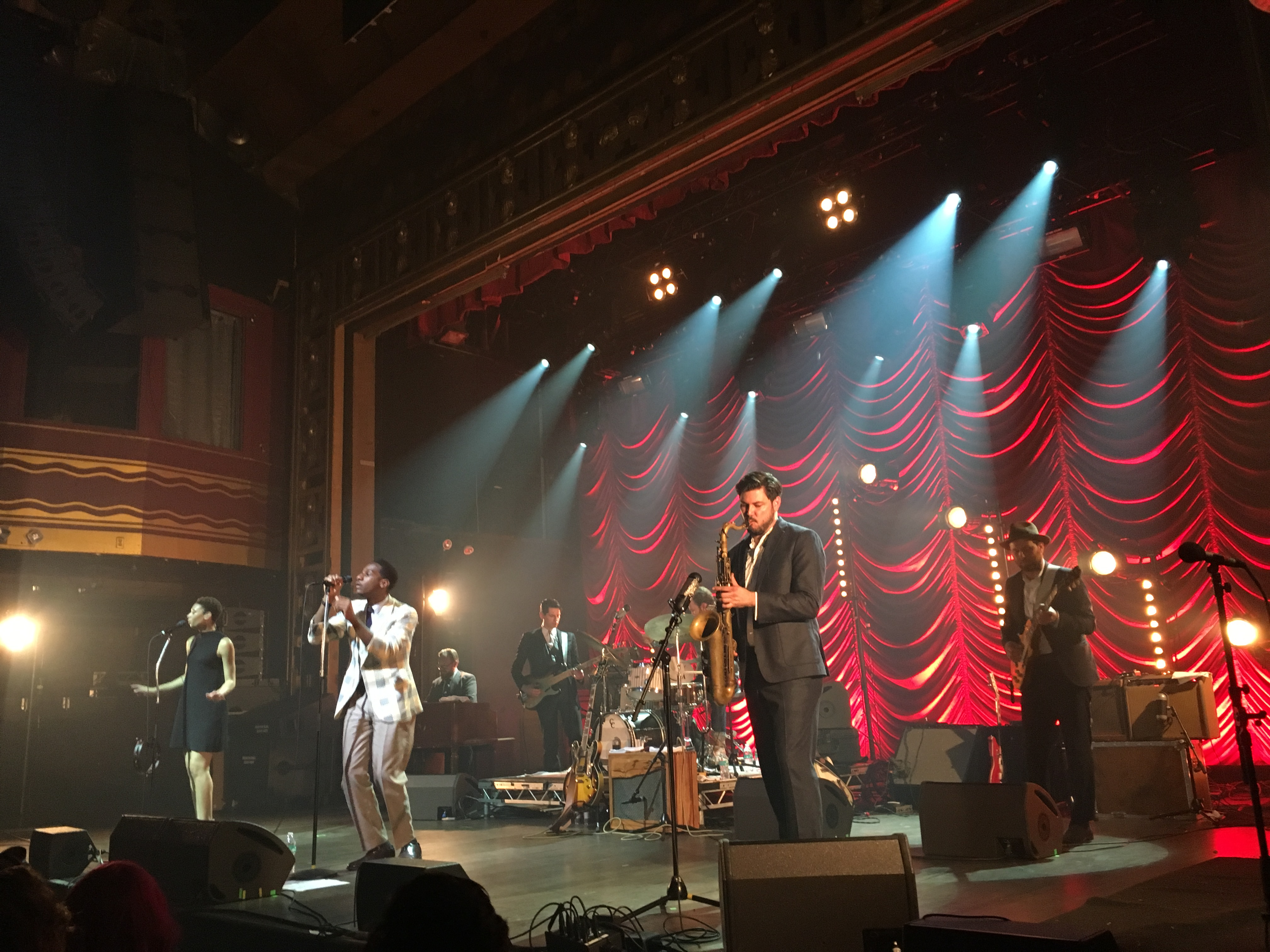
Bridges and his band at Webster Hall, Manhattan, in October 2015

Bridges began his first national tour in January 2015, playing shows in Texas as well as playing support for Sharon Van Etten in New York City. His first official single, "Coming Home", was released on Columbia Records in February 2015. The song continued the success of the demo version and became a Top 10 Most Viral Track on Spotify the same month as its release. Bridges toured with Jenkins and Block until they resumed work with White Denim. He also played at the Sundance Film Festival and played at the SXSW festival in 2015.

His debut album was released in the summer of 2015 and has been referred to as a 2015 "Album to Look Forward to From Texans" by The New York Times. Bridges made the cover of Fort Worth, Texas magazine in May 2015 for his vocal accomplishments and his distinctive retro style. "Coming Home" is featured in an Apple iPhone 6 commercial. Bridges made his first appearance in the UK as an artist in May when he sold out the London Village Underground. He went on to announce four July dates, ending with a gig at Shepherd's Bush Empire on September 28. Coming Home was nominated for Best R&B Album at the 58th Annual Grammy Awards.

Aside from his own shows, Bridges also supported Pharrell Williams at the Apple Music Festival on September 26. While opening at the intimate Roundhouse, he was able to perform songs such as "River", "Better Man" and "Lisa Sawyer" from his debut album Coming Home. Bridges was the featured musical guest on Saturday Night Live on December 5, 2015. He performed "Smooth Sailin'" with a full backup band and sang "River" with only backup singers and organ, accompanying himself on guitar.

=== 2016–2019: Good Thing and Texas Sun ===
Bridges also participated in Macklemore & Ryan Lewis's song "Kevin", which was released on the duo's second full-length album.

On February 24, 2016, Bridges performed in Washington, D.C., as part of the series "In Performance at the White House" for President and Michelle Obama. He performed a song by Ray Charles as well as one of his own songs.

On April 8, 2016, Bridges was the live artist featured on BBC Radio London Robert Elms show. Elms interviewed Bridges briefly, and played track 8, "Pull Away", from the Coming Home album. Bridges was set up to play live with Colin O'Brien. Together they performed a live version of "River". The live track was so well received it was played again as "live track of the week" on the Elms Saturday show on April 9, and again on April 11 during a program segment on the best-ever live performances on the Robert Elms show.

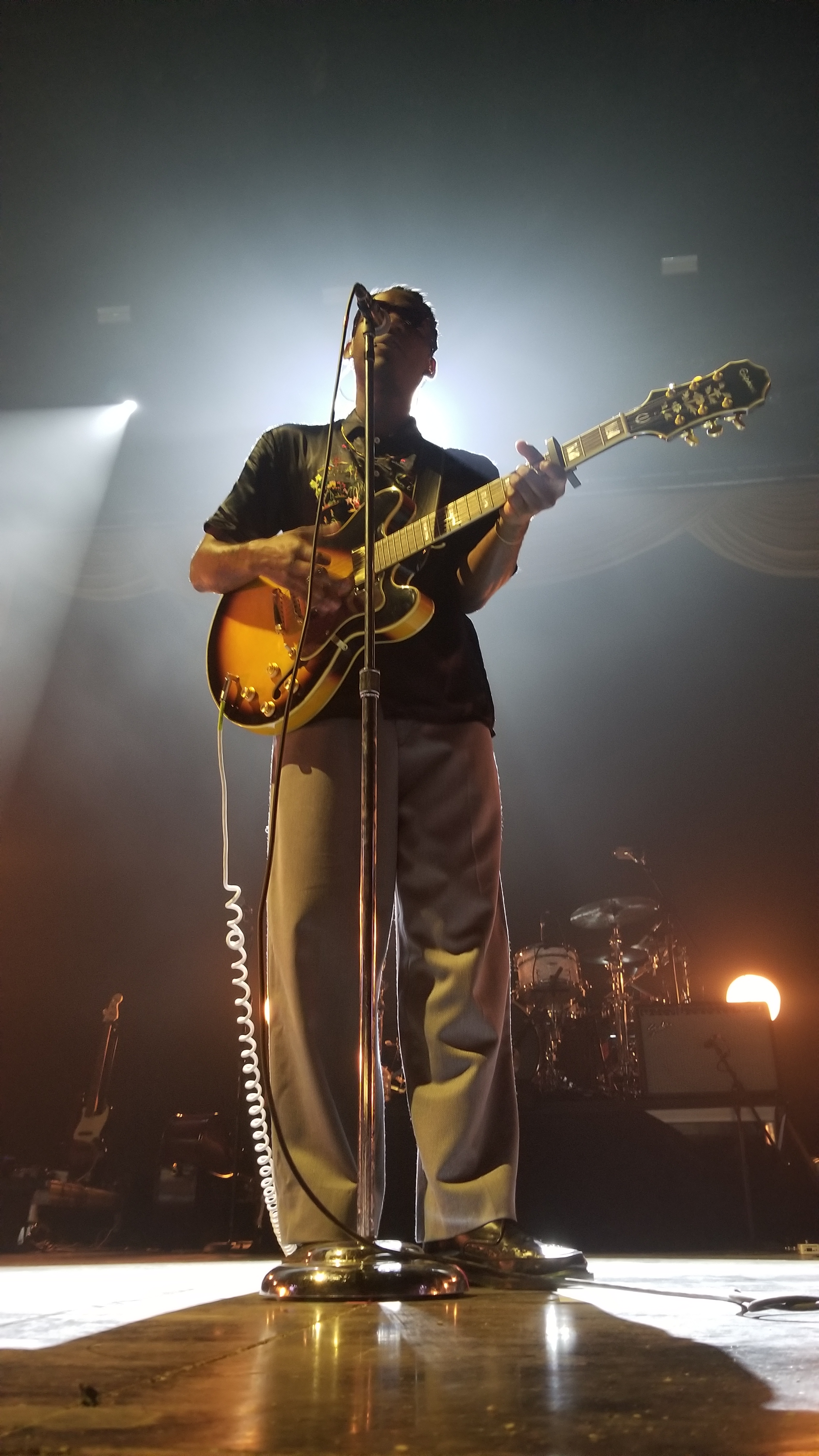
Bridges performing at Toyota Music Factory during tour for Good Thing, June 2018

In 2017 "River" received further recognition in the first season of the HBO series Big Little Lies. It was later included on the soundtrack for the show.

In 2018, his song "Better Man" was featured in the film Pacific Rim: Uprising. He was the opening act on the South American and Mexican legs of Harry Styles' first solo tour. Bridges' second album Good Thing was released on May 4, 2018. He had a cameo appearance in Damien Chazelle's film First Man, playing singer Gil Scott-Heron. Bridges and Gary Clark Jr. appeared together on the song "Gone Away" from rapper Bun B's album Return of the Trill, with Bridges singing the hook and Clark on lead guitar. On May 18, Bridges performed "Beyond" from the album Good Thing on an episode of the BBC series The Graham Norton Show.

In December 2019, Houston, Texas-based trio Khruangbin announced a collaboration and tour with Leon Bridges and released a single titled "Texas Sun" on December 6, 2019. The collaborative EP of the same name was released in February 2020.

=== 2020–2022: Gold-Diggers Sound and Texas Moon ===
On June 8, 2020, Bridges and Terrace Martin released a single titled "Sweeter" in response to the murder of George Floyd on May 25.

Bridges performed at the 2020 Democratic National Convention.

Bridges' third studio album, Gold-Diggers Sound, was released on July 23, 2021.

A second collaborative EP with Khruangbin, titled Texas Moon, was released on February 18, 2022.

=== 2024–present: Leon and Happiness Anytime ===
On August 8, 2024, Bridges released the single "Peaceful Place", simultaneously announcing his fourth studio album, Leon, which was released on October 4, 2024.

On July 17, 2026, Bridges released four singles from his fifth studio album, Happiness Anytime. The album was produced by J Lloyd-Watson and Lydia Kitto of Jungle, and was released on September 25, 2026.

== Musical style ==
=== Artistry ===
Bridges' music spans different genres, from revivalist 1960s soul music to 1990s neo-soul and contemporary R&B. In 2015, The Wall Street Journal described him as a "throwback to '60s-soul a la Otis Redding and Sam Cooke." Bridges only started listening to Cooke after he started writing music, having grown up listening to modern R&B artists such as Ginuwine, Usher, 112, Dru Hill, and Jodeci. Bridges' influences include Ginuwine, Usher, James Blake, Portishead, R. Kelly, Townes Van Zandt, Willie Nelson, and Arthur Alexander.

Bridges performs in vintage clothing; Fort Worth Weekly described him as someone whose "music sounds like he looks."

== Discography ==
=== Albums ===
Title	Details	Peak chart positions										Certifications
Title	Details	US	AUS	BEL (FL)	FRA	GER	NL	NZ	SPA	SWI	UK	Certifications
Coming Home	Released: June 23, 2015; Label: Columbia; Format: Digital download, CD, vinyl	6	8	104	61	89	10	13	49	35	8	RIAA: Platinum; ARIA: Gold; BPI: Gold; MC: Platinum
Good Thing	Released: May 4, 2018; Label: Columbia; Format: Digital download, CD, vinyl	3	8	17	130	93	22	13	47	40	20	RIAA: Gold
Gold-Diggers Sound	Released: July 23, 2021; Label: Columbia; Format: Digital download, CD, vinyl	17	25	22	— (Note: Gold-Diggers Sound did not enter the France Albums Chart but peaked at number 195 on the French Physical Albums Chart.)	81	17	31	—	51	93	
Leon	Released: October 4, 2024; Label: Columbia; Format: Digital download, CD, vinyl	58	85	65	— (Note: Leon did not enter the France Albums Chart but peaked at number 99 on the French Physical Albums Chart.)	—	37	38	—	—	70	
Happiness Anytime	Released: September 25, 2026; Label: Columbia; Format: Digital download, CD, vinyl	74	12	18	— (Note: Happiness Anytime did not enter the French Top Albums chart, but peaked at number 67 on the French Physical Albums chart.)	—	34	33	—	—	—	
"—" denotes releases that did not chart

=== Extended plays ===
Title	Details	Peak chart positions									
Title	Details	US	BEL (FL)	BEL (WA)	GER	NL Vinyl	NZ	POR	SCO	SWI	UK
Louisiana Sun	Released: February 5, 2016; Label: Columbia (AL88875146291); Format: Vinyl	—	—	—	—	—	—	—	—	—	—
Texas Sun (with Khruangbin)	Released: February 7, 2020; Label: Dead Oceans; Format: Digital download, streaming, vinyl	57	—	—	—	—	—	—	—	—	—
Texas Moon (with Khruangbin)	Released: February 18, 2022; Label: Dead Oceans; Format: Digital download, streaming, vinyl	23	4	110	12	2	28	44	9	19	41
"—" denotes releases that did not chart

=== Singles ===
==== As lead artist ====
Title	Year	Peak chart positions										Certifications	Album
Title	Year	US	US Rock	BEL (FL)	BEL (WA)	CAN	NL	NZ Hot	SCO	UK	WW	Certifications	Album
"Coming Home"	2015	— (Note: "Coming Home" did not enter the Billboard Hot 100, but peaked at number seven on the Hot Singles Sales chart.)	— (Note: "Coming Home" did not enter the Rock Songs chart, but peaked at number 38 on the Rock Airplay chart.)	— (Note: "Coming Home" did not enter the Flanders Ultratop Top 50, but charted as an extra tip on the Flanders Ultratop Bubbling Under chart.)	—	—	—	—	—	— (Note: "Coming Home" did not enter the UK Singles Chart, but peaked at number 58 on the UK Singles Sales Chart.)	—	RIAA: Platinum; BPI: Gold; MC: 2× Platinum; RMNZ: Platinum	Coming Home
"Smooth Sailin'"	2015	—	— (Note: "Smooth Sailin'" did not enter the Rock Songs chart, but peaked at number 36 on the Rock Airplay chart.)	66	—	—	—	—	—	—	—	RIAA: Gold	Coming Home
"Better Man"	2016	—	— (Note: "Better Man" did not enter the Hot Rock & Alternative Songs chart, but peaked at number 16 on the Triple A Airplay chart.)	57	75	—	—	—	—	—	—	RIAA: Gold; ARIA: Gold	Coming Home
"River"	2016	—	—	—	—	—	—	—	62	— (Note: "River" did not enter the UK Singles Chart, but peaked at number 77 on the UK Singles Sales Chart.)	—	RIAA: 2× Platinum; BPI: Gold; MC: 2× Platinum; RMNZ: 3× Platinum	Coming Home
"Bet Ain't Worth the Hand"	2018	—	—	57	—	—	—	—	—	—	—		Good Thing
"Bad Bad News"	2018	—	— (Note: "Bad Bad News" did not enter the Rock Songs chart, but peaked at number 31 on the Rock Airplay chart.)	79	—	—	—	—	—	—	—	RIAA: Gold; ARIA: Gold; MC: Gold; RMNZ: Gold	Good Thing
"Beyond"	2018	—	— (Note: "Beyond" did not enter the Rock Songs chart, but peaked at number 38 on the Rock Airplay chart.)	— (Note: "Beyond" did not enter the Flanders Ultratop Top 50, but charted as an extra tip on the Flanders Ultratop Bubbling Under chart.)	— (Note: "Beyond" did not enter the Wallonie Ultratop Top 50, but charted as an extra tip on the Wallonie Ultratop Bubbling Under chart.)	—	—	—	78	— (Note: "Beyond" did not enter the UK Singles Chart, but peaked at number 89 on the UK Singles Sales Chart Top 100.)	—	RIAA: Platinum; ARIA: 2× Platinum; BPI: Gold; MC: Platinum; RMNZ: 3× Platinum	Good Thing
"Liberated" (with Dej Loaf)	2018	—	—	—	—	—	—	—	—	—	—		Non-album single
"If It Feels Good (Then It Must Be)"	2018	—	— (Note: "If It Feels Good (Then It Must Be)" did not enter the Hot Rock & Alternative Songs chart, but peaked at number 7 on the Triple A Airplay chart.)	65	60	—	—	—	—	—	—		Good Thing
"That Was Yesterday"	2019	—	—	82	— (Note: "That Was Yesterday" did not enter the Wallonie Ultratop Top 50, but charted as an extra tip on the Wallonie Ultratop Bubbling Under chart.)	—	—	—	—	—	—		Non-album single
"July" (with Noah Cyrus)	2019	85	— (Note: "July" did not enter the Rock Songs chart, but peaked at number 38 on the Rock Airplay chart.)	63	—	40	— (Note: "July" did not enter the Netherlands' Single Top 100, but peaked at number seven on the Netherlands' Single Tip Chart.)	8	99	66	183	RIAA: 4× Platinum; ARIA: 4× Platinum	The End of Everything
"Texas Sun" (with Khruangbin)	2019	—	20	53	—	—	— (Note: "Texas Sun" did not enter the Netherlands' Single Top 100, but peaked at number 34 on the Netherlands' Airplay Chart.)	37	17	— (Note: "Texas Sun" did not enter the UK Singles Chart, but peaked at number 15 on the UK Singles Sales Chart Top 100.)	—	RIAA: Gold; BPI: Silver; RMNZ: 2× Platinum	Texas Sun
"C-Side" (with Khruangbin)	2020	—	—	—	—	—	—	—	—	—	—		Texas Sun
"Inside Friend" (featuring John Mayer)	2020	—	—	—	— (Note: "Inside Friend" did not enter the Wallonie Ultratop Top 50, but charted as an extra tip on the Wallonie Ultratop Bubbling Under chart.)	—	—	11	—	—	—		Non-album single
"Sweeter" (featuring Terrace Martin)	2020	—	— (Note: "Sweeter" did not enter the Hot Rock & Alternative Songs chart, but peaked at number 39 on the Triple A Airplay chart.)	64	—	—	—	—	—	—	—		Gold-Diggers Sound
"All About You" (with Lucky Daye)	2020	—	—	—	— (Note: "All About You" did not enter the Wallonie Ultratop Top 50, but charted as an extra tip on the Wallonie Ultratop Bubbling Under chart.)	—	—	—	—	—	—		Non-album singles
"Like a Ship" (with Keite Young)	2021	—	—	—	—	—	—	—	—	—	—		Non-album singles
"Motorbike"	2021	—	— (Note: "Motorbike" did not enter the Rock Songs chart, but peaked at number 42 on the Rock Airplay chart.)	—	—	—	—	33	—	—	—		Gold-Diggers Sound
"B-Side" (with Khruangbin)	2021	—	49	—	—	—	—	34	—	—	—		Texas Moon
"Purple Snowflakes" (Amazon Original)	2021	—	—	—	—	—	—	—	—	—	—		Non-album singles
"If You Were Mine" (with Miranda Lambert)	2023	— (Note: "If You Were Mine" did not enter the Billboard Hot 100, but peaked at number 30 on the Digital Song Sales chart.)	—	—	—	—	—	—	—	—	—		Non-album singles
"Peaceful Place"	2024	—	— (Note: "Peaceful Place" did not enter the Hot Rock & Alternative Songs chart, but peaked at number one on the Triple A Airplay chart.)	—	—	—	—	—	—	—	—		Leon
"Laredo"	2024	—	— (Note: "Laredo" did not enter the Rock Songs chart, but peaked at number 45 on the Rock Airplay chart.)	—	—	—	—	—	—	—	—		Leon
"That's What I Love"	2024	—	—	—	—	—	—	40	—	—	—		Leon
"Hold On"	2025	—	—	—	—	—	—	—	—	—	—		Non-album single
"Light the Way"	2026	—	— (Note: "Light the Way" did not enter the Hot Rock & Alternative Songs chart, but peaked at number 20 on the Triple A Airplay chart.)	—	—	—	—	27	—	—	—		Happiness Anytime
"—" denotes releases that did not chart

==== As featured artist ====
Title	Year	Peak chart positions							Album
Title	Year	US AAA	US Dance	US Rock Air.	BEL (WA)	LTU Air.	NZ Hot	SWE	Album
"Across the Room" (Odesza featuring Leon Bridges)	2017	6	30	38	— (Note: "Across the Room" did not enter the Wallonie Ultratop Top 50, but charted as an extra tip on the Wallonie Ultratop Bubbling Under chart.)	—	—	—	A Moment Apart
"Interstellar Love" (The Avalanches featuring Leon Bridges)	2020	—	—	—	—	—	—	—	We Will Always Love You
"The Hardest Part" (Olivia Dean featuring Leon Bridges)	2023	20	—	—	—	102	27	75	What Am I Gonna Do On Sundays?
"It Was Always You (Siempre Fuiste Tú)" (Carín León featuring Leon Bridges)	2024	—	—	—	—	—	—	—	Boca Chueca, Vol. 1
"Elegantly Wasted" (Hermanos Gutiérrez featuring Leon Bridges)	2025	—	—	40	—	—	—	—	Non-album single
"Burn It Down" (Shaboozey featuring Leon Bridges)	2026	—	—	—	—	—	—	—	The Outlaw Cherie Lee & Other Western Tales
"—" denotes releases that did not chart

=== Other charted songs ===
Title	Year	Peak chart positions							Album
Title	Year	US AAA	US Dance	US R&B	ICE	ITA Air.	LTU Air.	NZ Hot	Album
"Steam"	2021	11	—	23	31	—	—	34	Gold-Diggers Sound
"Why Don't You Touch Me"	2021	—	—	—	—	—	—	39	Gold-Diggers Sound
"Chocolate Hills" (with Khruangbin)	2022	—	—	—	—	—	—	40	Texas Moon
"Mariella" (with Khruangbin)	2022	—	—	—	—	—	—	28	Texas Moon
"High Rise" (Diplo featuring Amtrac and Leon Bridges)	2022	—	31	—	—	—	—	—	Diplo
"When a Man Cries"	2024	—	—	—	—	—	—	34	Leon
"Panther City"	2024	—	—	—	—	—	—	18	Leon
"Ain't Got Nothing on You"	2024	—	—	—	—	—	—	38	Leon
"Talk It Over"	2026	—	—	—	—	73	—	—	Happiness Anytime
"Watch You Dance"	2026	—	—	—	—	—	151	—	Happiness Anytime
"—" denotes releases that did not chart

=== Guest appearances ===
Year	Title	Artist(s)	Album
2016	"Katchi"	Nick Waterhouse	Never Twice
2016	"On My Own"	Lecrae	The Birth of a Nation: The Inspired By Album
2016	"Kevin"	Macklemore & Ryan Lewis	This Unruly Mess I've Made
2016	"Present Without a Bow"	Kacey Musgraves	A Very Kacey Christmas
2018	"Gone Away"	Bun B, Gary Clark Jr.	Return of the Trill
2019	"God Is Love"	Common	Let Love
2024	"Clear My Rain"	Gunna	One of Wun

=== Music videos ===
Year	Title	Director(s)
2015	"Coming Home"	Chip Tompkins
2015	"Better Man"	David Nelson
2015	"Smooth Sailin'"	Vern Moen
2015	"River"	Miles Jay
2018	"Bad Bad News"	Natalie Rae
2018	"Beyond"	Josh Goleman

== Awards and nominations ==
=== Grammy Awards ===
Year	Nominee / work	Award	Result
2016	Coming Home	Best R&B Album	Nominated
2017	"River"	Best Music Video	Nominated
2019	Good Thing	Best R&B Album	Nominated
2019	"Bet Ain't Worth the Hand"	Best Traditional R&B Performance	Won

== See also ==
- List of Columbia Records artists
- Music of Texas
