= Good Thing (Leon Bridges album) =

Studio album by Leon Bridges
- Released: May 4, 2018
- Studios: Elysian Park (Los Angeles); Gator World (Asheville); Niles City Sound (Fort Worth); Setting Sun (Twentynine Palms)
- Length: 34:46
- Label: Columbia
- Producers: King Garbage; Nate Mercereau; Niles City Sound; Ricky Reed

Leon Bridges chronology
Coming Home (2015)	Good Thing (2018)	Gold-Diggers Sound (2021)

Singles from Good Thing
- 1. "Bet Ain't Worth the Hand" Released: March 13, 2018; 2. "Bad Bad News" Released: March 13, 2018; 3. "Beyond" Released: April 20, 2018

Good Thing is the second album by the American singer Leon Bridges. It was released on May 4, 2018, by Columbia Records. The album was supported by three singles: "Bet Ain't Worth the Hand", "Bad Bad News" and "Beyond".

Good Thing received generally positive reviews from critics and debuted at number 3 on the US Billboard 200. The album was nominated for Best R&B Album at the 2019 Grammy Awards. Its single "Bet Ain't Worth the Hand" won a Grammy for Best Traditional R&B Performance.

== Singles ==
The singles "Bet Ain't Worth the Hand" and "Bad Bad News" were released for digital download on March 13, 2018, with "Bet Ain't Worth the Hand" later sent to urban contemporary radio on April 10, 2018.

The album's third single, "Beyond", was released on April 20, 2018, it was later sent to urban contemporary radio on April 30, 2018.

== Critical reception ==
Professional ratings
Aggregate scores
Source	Rating
AnyDecentMusic?	6.9/10
Metacritic	74/100
Review scores
Source	Rating
AllMusic	4/5 stars
Exclaim!	8/10
The Guardian	4/5 stars
The Independent	4/5 stars
NME	4/5 stars
The Observer	3/5 stars
Paste	6.7/10
Pitchfork	7.2/10
Rolling Stone	3.5/5 stars
Slant Magazine	3/5 stars

Good Thing was met with generally positive reviews. At Metacritic, which assigns a normalized rating out of 100 to reviews from mainstream publications, the album received an average score of 74, based on 17 reviews. Aggregator AnyDecentMusic? gave it 6.9 out of 10, based on their assessment of the critical consensus.

Chris Willman of Variety gave the album a positive review stating, "The new album is not that drastically less of a classicist affair than Coming Home, when all is said and done, but this time it's a whole variety pack of retro". Luke Fox of Exclaim! wrote: "Leon Bridges' sophomore record rings as an endorsement of his range. And that's a great thing for Good Thing, which tempers its pop-radio ambitions with unique bends on the age-old love song in this super-tight, 35-minute ride." Tara Joshi of The Guardian said, "Bridges doesn't entirely leave behind his old-school roots, but, while Good Thing is hardly the next Blonde or, indeed, 24K Magic, it leaves you with a greater sense of who he is: loved-up, and striving for a level of ambition that feels within reach". Reviewing the album for Pitchfork, Olivia Horn said that "On Good Thing, Bridges has kept his heart on his sleeve but updated his parlance to something a little less affected, a little more believable". Joe Levy of Rolling Stone said, "Not everything works. "If It Feels Good (Then It Must Be)" and "You Don't Know" feel like fake Pharrell, which is some pretty thin plastic. But the closers—the skin-to-skin makeup sex ballad "Mrs." and the free-ranging autobiographical narrative "Georgia to Texas" (Bridges' second tribute to his mom in as many albums)—show how expansive and individual Bridges can be, even as he guns for the charts".

In more mixed reviews, Slant Magazine's Zachary Hoskins stated: "The album falters when Bridges strays from his retro-soul wheelhouse." Kitty Empire of The Observer said, "Certain sections of Bridges's audience are likely to define themselves against modern forms, so there is a risk here. But Bridges handles the transition deftly". Kate Lismore of DIY commented that, "While he proves in spades that he's not merely a throwback artist who has to rely on nostalgia, the mishmash of sounds coming from the album does feel a little muddled at times".

=== Year-end lists ===
Select year-end rankings of Good Thing
Publication	List	Rank	Ref.
Clash	Clash Albums of the Year 2018	24	
Exclaim!	Top 10 Soul and R&B Albums	7	
Uproxx	The 50 Best Albums of 2018	34	

=== Industry awards ===
Awards and nominations for Good Thing
Year	Ceremony	Category	Result	Ref.
2018	Soul Train Music Awards	Best Album of the Year	Nominated	
2019	Grammy Awards	Best R&B Album	Nominated	

== Commercial performance ==
Good Thing debuted at number three on the US Billboard 200 with 66,000 album-equivalent units, of which 59,000 were pure album sales.

== Track listing ==
Good Thing track listing
No.	Title	Writer(s)	Producer(s)	Length
1.	"Bet Ain't Worth the Hand"	Todd Bridges; Nate Mercereau; Eric Frederic; Wayne Hector; Steve Wyreman; Austin Jenkins; Joshua Block; Curtis Mayfield; Donna Missal	Mercereau; Ricky Reed	3:05
2.	"Bad Bad News"	Bridges; Mercereau; Frederic; Hector; Jenkins; Block	Mercereau; Reed	3:27
3.	"Shy"	Bridges; Jenkins; Frederic; Dan Wilson; Block	Reed; Niles City Sound	3:14
4.	"Beyond"	Bridges; Mercereau; Frederic; Justin Tranter; Jenkins; Block	Mercereau; Reed	4:00
5.	"Forgive You"	Bridges; Mercereau; Frederic; Tranter	Mercereau; Reed	3:41
6.	"Lions"	Bridges; Zachary Cooper; Frederic; Victor Dimotsis; Hector	Reed; King Garbage	3:02
7.	"If It Feels Good (Then It Must Be)"	Bridges; Frederic; Mercereau; Teddy Geiger; Block; Jenkins; William Shelby; Dana Meyers	Reed; Mercereau	3:14
8.	"You Don't Know"	Bridges; Frederic; Hector; Jenkins; Block	Reed; Niles City Sound	2:52
9.	"Mrs."	Bridges; Cooper; Frederic; Tranter; Dimotsis	Reed; King Garbage	4:02
10.	"Georgia to Texas"	Bridges; Frederic; Block; Jenkins	Reed; Niles City Sound	4:09
Total length:				34:46

Japanese edition
No.	Title	Writer(s)	Producer(s)	Length
11.	"Naomi"	Bridges; Frederic; Mercereau; Tranter; Jenkins; Block	Reed; Mercereau	3:50
Total length:				38:41

== Personnel ==
Adapted from the album's liner notes.

Musicians

- Nate Mercereau – bass, guitar (tracks 1, 2, 4, 5, 7), drums (tracks 1, 2, 4, 6), French horn, trumpet (tracks 1, 2), glockenspiel, strings (track 1), keyboards (tracks 2, 4, 6, 7), percussion (tracks 2, 4, 5), piano (tracks 2, 5, 10), organ (track 4)
- Steve Wyreman – guitar (track 1)
- Shaina Evoniuk – violin (track 1)
- Ben Schwier – piano (track 1)
- Joshua Block – drums (tracks 2, 3, 10), percussion (track 7)
- Jeff Dazey – saxophone (tracks 2, 10)
- Austin Jenkins – bass (tracks 3, 8), guitar (tracks 3, 8)
- Dan Wilson – synthesizer (track 3)
- Ricky Reed – synthesizer (track 5), keyboards (tracks 7, 8), percussion (track 7)
- Zachary Cooper – bass (tracks 6, 9), guitar (tracks 6, 9)
- Victor Dimotsis – drums (track 9), keyboards (track 9)
- Andrew Skates – bass (track 10)

Technical

- Nate Mercereau – recording (tracks 1, 2, 4, 5)
- Ethan Shumaker – recording (all tracks)
- Victor Dimotsis – recording (tracks 6, 9)
- Zachary Cooper – recording (tracks 6, 9)
- Joshua Block – recording (track 10)
- Manny Marroquin – mixing (all tracks)
- Chris Galland – mixing (all tracks)
- Robin Florent – mixing assistance (all tracks)
- Scott Desmarais – mixing assistance (all tracks)
- Chris Gehringer – mastering (all tracks)

== Charts ==
Chart performance for Good Thing
Chart (2018)	Peak position
Australian Albums (ARIA)	8
Belgian Albums (Ultratop Flanders)	17
Belgian Albums (Ultratop Wallonia)	176
Canadian Albums (Billboard)	3
Czech Albums (ČNS IFPI)	85
Dutch Albums (Album Top 100)	22
German Albums (Offizielle Top 100)	93
Irish Albums (IRMA)	44
New Zealand Albums (RMNZ)	13
Scottish Albums (Official Charts)	25
Spanish Albums (PROMUSICAE)	47
Swiss Albums (Schweizer Hitparade)	40
UK Albums (Official Charts)	20
US Billboard 200	3
US Top R&B/Hip-Hop Albums (Billboard)	3
