= Coming Home (Leon Bridges song) =

Single by Leon Bridges

from the album Coming Home
- B-side: "Better Man"
- Released: February 3, 2015
- Recorded: 2015
- Genre: Soul; R&B; doo wop
- Length: 3:36
- Label: Columbia
- Songwriters: Todd Bridges; Austin Michael Jenkins; Chris Vivion; Joshua Block
- Producer: Niles City Sound

Leon Bridges singles chronology
"Coming Home" (2015)	"Smooth Sailin'" (2015)

Music video
- "Coming Home" on YouTube

"Coming Home" is a song co-written and performed by American rhythm and blues singer Leon Bridges, issued as the first single from his debut studio album of the same name. The song peaked at number seven on the Billboard Triple A chart in 2015. In 2022 the song was featured in a McDonald's advert.

== Live performances ==
Bridges performed "Coming Home" on The Tonight Show Starring Jimmy Fallon on June 22, 2015. On August 5, he performed the song on Conan.

== Music video ==
The official music video for the song was directed by Chip Tompkins. The music video was released on March 3, 2015, and as of August 2022, has over 32 million views. The video's mid-century aesthetic reflects the song's musical production, which was recorded using exclusively vintage equipment to explore the synergy between early 1960s gospel and soul music. Visually complementing the track's swinging rhythm and intimate interplay between lead and background vocals, the video mirrors the retro arrangement, which features a descending organ line weaving around Bridges' triplet vocal phrasing.

== Charts ==
=== Weekly charts ===
Chart (2015)	Peak position
US Adult Alternative Songs (Billboard)	7
US Adult Top 40 (Billboard)	39
US Hot R&B Songs (Billboard)	19

=== Year-end charts ===
Chart (2015)	Position
US Adult Alternative Songs (Billboard)	12

== Certifications ==
Region	Certification	Certified units/sales
Canada (Music Canada)	Platinum	80,000^{‡}
New Zealand (RMNZ)	2× Platinum	60,000^{‡}
United Kingdom (BPI)	Gold	400,000^{‡}
United States (RIAA)	Gold	500,000^{‡}
^{‡} Sales+streaming figures based on certification alone.
