= Smooth Sailin' (Leon Bridges song) =

Single by Leon Bridges

from the album Coming Home
- Released: June 2, 2015
- Recorded: 2015
- Genre: R&B
- Length: 3:03
- Label: Columbia
- Songwriters: Todd Bridges; Austin Michael Jenkins; Chris Vivion; Joshua Block
- Producer: Niles City Sound

Leon Bridges singles chronology
| "Coming Home" (2015) | "Smooth Sailin'" (2015) | "Lisa Sawyer" (2015) |

Music video
- "Smooth Sailin'" on YouTube

"Smooth Sailin'" is a song co-written and performed by American rhythm and blues singer Leon Bridges, issued as the second single from his debut studio album Coming Home. As of January 9, 2016, the song has reached #1 on the Billboard Triple A chart.

On December 5, 2015, Bridges performed "Smooth Sailin'" on Saturday Night Live.

== Critical reception ==
"Smooth Sailin'" has received positive reviews. Gabriela Tully Claymore of Stereogum called it "a feel-good love song"; while Lauren Nostro of Complex referred to it as "a perfect, slow-burning track that [would] soundtrack [the listener's] entire summer". Paley Martin of Billboard stated that the song is "equal parts fresh and nostalgic" while complimenting Bridges' "signature retro sound with vocals that match".

== Music video ==
The music video for "Smooth Sailin'" was directed by Vern Moen.

== Charts ==
=== Weekly charts ===
| Chart (2015) | Peak position |
|---|---|
| US Adult Alternative Songs (Billboard) | 1 |

=== Year-end charts ===
| Chart (2016) | Position |
|---|---|
| US Adult Alternative Songs (Billboard) | 10 |
