= Sweeter (Leon Bridges song) =

2020 single by Leon Bridges featuring Terrace Martin

Single by Leon Bridges featuring Terrace Martin

from the album Gold-Diggers Sound
- Released: June 8, 2020
- Studio: Gold-Diggers Sound
- Genre: R&B
- Length: 2:47
- Label: Columbia Records
- Songwriters: Todd Bridges; Terrace Martin; Eric Frederic; Dan Wilson; Rome Castille; Nate Mercereau; Zach Cooper; Vic Dimotsis
- Producers: Ricky Reed; Nate Mercereau

Leon Bridges singles chronology
"Inside Friend" (2020)	"Sweeter" (2020)	"Like a Ship" (2021)

Music video
- "Sweeter" on YouTube

"Sweeter" is a song by American singer-songwriter Leon Bridges featuring Terrace Martin. The murder of George Floyd compelled Bridges to release the song early on June 8, 2020, originally intended for a 2021 release with the album Gold-Diggers Sound. "Sweeter" is an anti-racist R&B ballad from the perspective of a murdered Black man taking his last breath, and was one of the many protest songs in 2020 released following the deaths of Floyd, Breonna Taylor, and Ahmaud Arbery. On June 16, 2020, Bridges released the music video for the song, which was directed by Rambo Elliott. The video featured Bridges' father and old friends, and Bridges described it as a celebration of their Blackness.

The song was placed on several critics' lists. It ranked number 16 on Variety's Best Songs of 2020.

== Background and composition ==
"If it weren’t for the pandemic, a song like Sweeter wouldn’t have had the impact that it did. I wrote that well before all the riots and everything with George Floyd. That’s just a testament to the perpetual narrative of unarmed Black men dying at the hands of police. Hopefully, in a minuscule way, Sweeter was a beacon of hope and light for the Black community.”

— Leon Bridges, 2021.

As a Black man from Texas, Bridges lived in fear of being lynched after the 1998 murder of James Byrd Jr.. In 2015, he wrote a country ballad about police brutality, which narrated a Black man's murder at the hands of a white cop, but shelved it out of fear that the people he wrote the song for would not listen to it. At Gold-Diggers Sound, Los Angeles, the studio in which he was working on his third studio album of the same name, Bridges remembered the song after being inspired by a chord progression musician Terrace Martin did on a beat. It became "Sweeter", featured on Gold-Diggers Sound. Bridges stated that the songs "Blowin' in the Wind" by Bob Dylan and "A Change Is Gonna Come" by Sam Cooke served as blueprints for "Sweeter".

After the 2020 murder of George Floyd, Bridges felt compelled to release the song earlier than intended. In a statement that came with the song's release, Bridges recounted his and his friends' experiences with racism and how Black people are taught to conduct themselves from adolescence to avoid the consequences of racial profiling. He further stated how he has long been numb to issues of police brutality, and George Floyd was personally the "straw that broke the camel’s back", concluding with: "It was the first time I wept for a man I never met. I am George Floyd, my brothers are George Floyd, and my sisters are George Floyd. I cannot and will not be silent any longer. Just as Abel’s blood was crying out to God, George Floyd is crying out to me. So, I present to you Sweeter."

"Sweeter" is an anti-racist R&B ballad with a "melancholy chord progression". Over a minimal Roland 808 loop, trap beats and electric piano chords, with Martin playing a "meditative saxophone melody", Bridges sings from the perspective of a murdered Black man taking his last breath with his mind, body, and soul flashing back, which Bridges described as the "perpetual story." The narrator is dead, and his mother, sisters, and brothers weep over him. Bridges references Martin Luther King and questions the lack of change since the 1960s: “I thought we moved on from the darker days / Did the words of the King disappear in the air like a butterfly?” The song meditates on racial injustice, compelling the listener to action. Taylor Crumpton of NPR stated that Bridges "addresses the historic wounds of white supremacy upon the heart in a soft and delicate voice that chastises the removal of George Floyd from his community like God proclaimed to Cain", as he sings "Hoping for a life more sweeter / Instead, I'm just a story repeating". Crumpton further stated that Bridges' allusion to the "sweet voices" of "sisters and brothers" and the "tears" of "mothers" preserves in folklore the stories of "fallen family members", which Crumpton likened to a contribution to "Texan ghost stories."

"Sweeter" was one of the many protest songs in 2020 released following the deaths of Floyd, Breonna Taylor, and Ahmaud Arbery.

== Critical reception ==
Will Lavin of NME described "Sweeter" as a "harrowing tribute" that "severely pulls at the heartstrings." Randall Roberts of the Los Angeles Times said the song was a "spellbinding and heartbreaking indictment of a system that denies equal opportunity for all." Chris Deville of Stereogum called the song "a lovely and compelling piece of music." Stereogum in its Best 5 Songs of the Week list described "Sweeter" as "crushing and immaculate" with a gorgeous arrangement which "emphasizes the directness of Bridges' lyrics about living under the daily shadow of racism."

Variety placed the song at number 16 on their Best Songs of 2020 list, while NPR placed the song at number 93 on their 100 Best Music of 2020 list. The Los Angeles Times included it in their list of five essential anti-racism songs from Southern California. Esquire included it in their 33 Greatest Protest Songs Ever list.

== Music video ==
Released on June 16, 2020, the music video for "Sweeter" takes place in his old neighborhood on the Southside of Fort Worth, Texas, and features Bridges' father and old friends, as well as local gang members that his father had mentored in the past. Bridges referred to it as a "celebration of our Blackness." It was directed by Rambo Elliott, a director based in Fort Worth.

== Live performances ==
On June 19, 2020, Bridges, Martin, and Robert Glasper performed "Sweeter" on The Late Late Show with James Corden. On August 17 of the same year, Bridges and Martin performed the song at the 2020 Democratic National Convention.

== Credits and personnel ==
Credits are adapted from the liner notes of Gold-Diggers Sound. The song was mixed and engineered at Gold-Diggers Sound (Los Angeles, California).

- Todd Bridges, Terrace Martin, Eric Frederic, Dan Wilson, Rome Castille, Nate Mercereau, Zach Cooper, and Vic Dimotsis – songwriting
- Ricky Reed and Nate Mercereau – production
- Bill Malina and Ethan Shumaker – engineering
- James Kirk and Jonathan Thompson – assistant engineering
- Ricky Reed – mixing
- Ricky Reed – drum programming
- Nate Mercereau – guitar
- Nate Mercereau – bass
- Terrace Martin – piano
- Terrace Martin – saxophone

== See also ==
- Black Lives Matter
- George Floyd protests
