= Coming Home (Leon Bridges album) =

Studio album by Leon Bridges
- Released: June 23, 2015
- Studios: Niles City Sound, Fort Worth, Texas
- Genres: R&B; soul
- Length: 34:11
- Label: Columbia
- Producer: Niles City Sound

Leon Bridges chronology
Coming Home (2015)	Good Thing (2018)

Singles from Coming Home
- 1. "Coming Home" Released: February 3, 2015; 2. "Smooth Sailin'" Released: June 2, 2015

Coming Home is the debut studio album by American singer Leon Bridges. It was released on June 23, 2015, by Columbia Records. The album was written by Leon Bridges, Austin Michael Jenkins, Joshua Block, Chris Vivion and produced by Niles City Sound.

Coming Home was supported by two singles: "Coming Home" and "Smooth Sailin'". The album received generally positive reviews from critics, and charted at number six on the US Billboard 200. It was nominated for Best R&B Album at the 2016 Grammy Awards.

== Singles ==
"Coming Home" was released as the lead single from the album on February 3, 2015, by Columbia Records. The song continued the success of the demo version and became a "Top 10 Most Viral Track" on Spotify, the same month as its release. The album's second single, "Smooth Sailin'", was released on June 2, 2015.

== Critical reception ==
Professional ratings
Aggregate scores
Source	Rating
AnyDecentMusic?	7.4/10
Metacritic	78/100
Review scores
Source	Rating
AllMusic	3/5 stars
The Daily Telegraph	4/5 stars
The Guardian	3/5 stars
Mojo	4/5 stars
NME	8/10
The Observer	4/5 stars
Pitchfork	7.0/10
Q	4/5 stars
Rolling Stone	3.5/5 stars
Spin	7/10

Coming Home was met with generally positive reviews. At Metacritic, which assigns a normalized rating out of 100 to reviews from mainstream publications, the album received an average score of 78, based on 21 reviews. Aggregator AnyDecentMusic? gave it 7.4 out of 10, based on their assessment of the critical consensus.

Adam Kivel of Consequence said, "On Coming Home, Bridges solidly aligns with the latter, his soulful R&B studied and nostalgic, but also immediate and emotionally true". Ryan Patrick of Exclaim! said, "Coming Home is a star-making vehicle that is solidly crafted, robustly traditionalist and palpably soulful. This is not just a nostalgia act; this is music from the heart, and the soul". Leonie Cooper of NME also gave the album a positive review stating, "Coming Home exists in a satin-swathed timewarp that takes you back 55 years. Texan singer Leon Bridges' debt to the warmth of soul pioneer Sam Cooke is evident in every tune on a debut album where even the stylish artwork acts as an unreconstructed envoy to a 1960 dependent on daiquiris and dinner dances". Kitty Empire of The Observer said, "Coming Home is, perhaps, a healthy reiteration of the classic sounds of succour in a time of need; a principled and mellifluous nay-saying". Ernest Wilkins of Pitchfork said, "While he obviously has good intentions, at times, Bridges can't help but come off as an imitator". Chuck Arnold of Rolling Stone gave the album a positive review stating, "Leon Bridges is a throwback to the days when guys did things like "swim the Mississippi" to impress their dates ("Better Man"). But this retro-soul man doesn't have to work so hard to win you over on his debut LP: His smooth, Sam Cooke-esque croon makes Coming Home the best kind of nostalgia trip. Tunes like the tender title track dance right back to the late Fifties, and album closer "River" is a gospel-blues testimony that runs deep".

Harley Brown of Spin said, "What it does best is address the simple lament of not having anything to twist to in too long". Jonathan Hatchman of Clash gave the album a positive review stating, "Texas has always been a state synonymous with pioneering musical innovation. Yet, with the release of Fort Worth native Leon Bridges' debut album, an anomaly has arisen which sends the listener back into the past. Having begun his career with a string of open-mic night shows, his rich blend of soul and rhythm 'n' blues influences peppered a demo of Bridges' album title track, which received an overwhelming level of success after its appearance on SoundCloud". Andy Kellman of AllMusic said, "It's all a pleasing time warp without turbulence, one with songs built more to evoke the past than to last in one's memory". Tim Jonze of The Guardian said, "Bridges has a fantastic voice, but you sense he's also yet to truly find it".

=== Year-end lists ===
Select year-end rankings of Coming Home
Publication	List	Rank	Ref.
Mojo	Top 50 Albums of 2015	27	
Rolling Stone	50 Best Albums of 2015	31	

=== Industry awards ===
Awards and nominations for Coming Home
Year	Ceremony	Category	Result	Ref.
2016	Grammy Awards	Best R&B Album	Nominated	

== Commercial performance ==
Coming Home debuted at number six on the US Billboard 200 selling 42,000 equivalent copies (38,000 in pure album sales). On June 24, 2015, the album was at number five on The Official Chart Update in the United Kingdom.

== Track listing ==
All songs produced by Niles City Sound.

Coming Home track listing
No.	Title	Writer(s)	Length
1.	"Coming Home"	Todd Bridges; Austin Jenkins; Joshua Block; Chris Vivion	3:26
2.	"Better Man"	Bridges; Jenkins; Block; Vivion	2:21
3.	"Brown Skin Girl"	Bridges; Jenkins; Block; Vivion	3:26
4.	"Smooth Sailin'"	Bridges; Jenkins; Block; Vivion	3:07
5.	"Shine"	Bridges; Jenkins; Block; Vivion	3:38
6.	"Lisa Sawyer"	Bridges; Jenkins; Block; Vivion	4:05
7.	"Flowers"	Bridges; Jenkins; Block; Vivion	2:56
8.	"Pull Away"	Bridges; Jenkins; Block; Vivion	3:02
9.	"Twistin' & Groovin'"	Bridges; Jenkins; Block; Vivion	4:14
10.	"River"	Bridges; Jenkins; Block; Vivion	3:56
Total length:			34:11

Deluxe edition (bonus tracks)
No.	Title	Writer(s)	Length
11.	"There She Goes"	Bridges; Jenkins; Block; Vivion	2:35
12.	"Daisy Mae"	Bridges; Jenkins; Block; Vivion	2:56
13.	"Mississippi Kisses"	Bridges; Jenkins; Block; Vivion	2:24
14.	"Here in My Arms"	Bridges; Jenkins; Block; Vivion	2:07
15.	"Outta Line"	Bridges; Jenkins; Block; Vivion	2:02
Total length:			46:15

Notes

- "Coming Home" and "Here In My Arms" features background vocals from Gabriel Lawson and Tyesha Simpson
- "Better Man" features background vocals from Brittni Jessie, Tyesha Simpson, Ansley Dougherty and Njia Martin
- "Brown Skin Girl" features background vocals from Paul Andrade, Brittni Jessie and Beth Riley
- "Smooth Sailin'" features background vocals from Brittni Jessie
- "Shine" features background vocals from Brittni Jessie, Elle Chupik, Beth Riley and Katie Robertson
- "Lisa Sawyer", "Twistin' & Groovin'", "Daisy Mae" and "Outta Line" features background vocals from Beth Riley, Brittni Jessie and Elle Chupik
- "Flowers" and "Pull Away" features background vocals from Brandon Marcel, Brittni Jessie, Elle Chupik and Beth Riley
- "River" features background vocals from Paul Andrade, Shon Gardner, Brittni Jessie, Tyesha Simpson, Njia Martin and Ansley Dougherty
- "There She Goes" features background vocals from Brittni Jessie, Gabriel Lawson, Elle Chupik, Beth Riley and Katie Robertson
- "Mississippi Kisses" features background vocals from Paul André, Jake Paleshic, Brandon Marcel and Jake Hill

== Personnel ==
Credits adapted from the album's liner notes.

Musicians

- Andrew Skates – piano (tracks 1, 4, 7, 14), organ (tracks 1–3, 5, 6, 9, 11–14), bass (track 8)
- Cliff Wright – bass (tracks 1–5, 7, 9, 11–14)
- Josh Block – drums (tracks 1–9, 11–15)
- Kenny Wayne Hollingsworth – electric guitar (tracks 1–9, 11–15)
- Austin Jenkins – electric guitar (tracks 1–3, 5–9, 11, 12, 14), acoustic guitar (track 4), bass (tracks 6, 12, 15)
- Jeff Dazey – saxophone (tracks 1, 3–7, 9, 15), piano (tracks 8, 11, 15), baritone saxophone, tenor saxophone (track 12)

Technical

- Niles City Sound – recording (all tracks), mixing (all tracks)
- Ryan Joseph – engineering assistance (tracks 1–3, 10–15)
- Joe LaPorta – mastering (all tracks)

Additional personnel

- Rambo – photography
- Dave Bett – art direction, design

== Charts ==
=== Weekly charts ===
Chart performance for Coming Home
Chart (2015)	Peak position
Australian Albums (ARIA)	8
Belgian Albums (Ultratop Flanders)	41
Belgian Albums (Ultratop Wallonia)	172
Canadian Albums (Billboard)	5
Dutch Albums (Album Top 100)	10
French Albums (SNEP)	61
German Albums (Offizielle Top 100)	89
New Zealand Albums (RMNZ)	13
Scottish Albums (Official Charts)	14
Spanish Albums (Promusicae)	49
Swiss Albums (Schweizer Hitparade)	35
UK Albums (Official Charts)	8
UK R&B Albums (Official Charts)	1
US Billboard 200	6
US Top R&B/Hip-Hop Albums (Billboard)	1

=== Year-end charts ===
2015 year-end chart performance for Coming Home
Chart (2015)	Position
US Top R&B/Hip-Hop Albums (Billboard)	30

2016 year-end chart performance for Coming Home
Chart (2016)	Position
US Top R&B/Hip-Hop Albums (Billboard)	22

== Certifications ==
Certifications and sales for Coming Home
Region	Certification	Certified units/sales
Australia (ARIA)	Gold	35,000^{‡}
Canada (Music Canada)	Platinum	80,000^{‡}
Denmark (IFPI Danmark)	Gold	10,000^{‡}
United Kingdom (BPI)	Gold	100,000^{‡}
United States (RIAA)	Platinum	1,000,000^{‡}
^{‡} Sales+streaming figures based on certification alone.

== Release history ==
Release dates and formats for Coming Home
Region	Date	Label(s)	Format(s)	Edition	Ref.
United States	June 23, 2015	Columbia	CD; digital download; LP	Standard	
United States	February 5, 2016	Columbia	Digital download	Deluxe	
