= BeatKing =

American rapper (1984–2024)

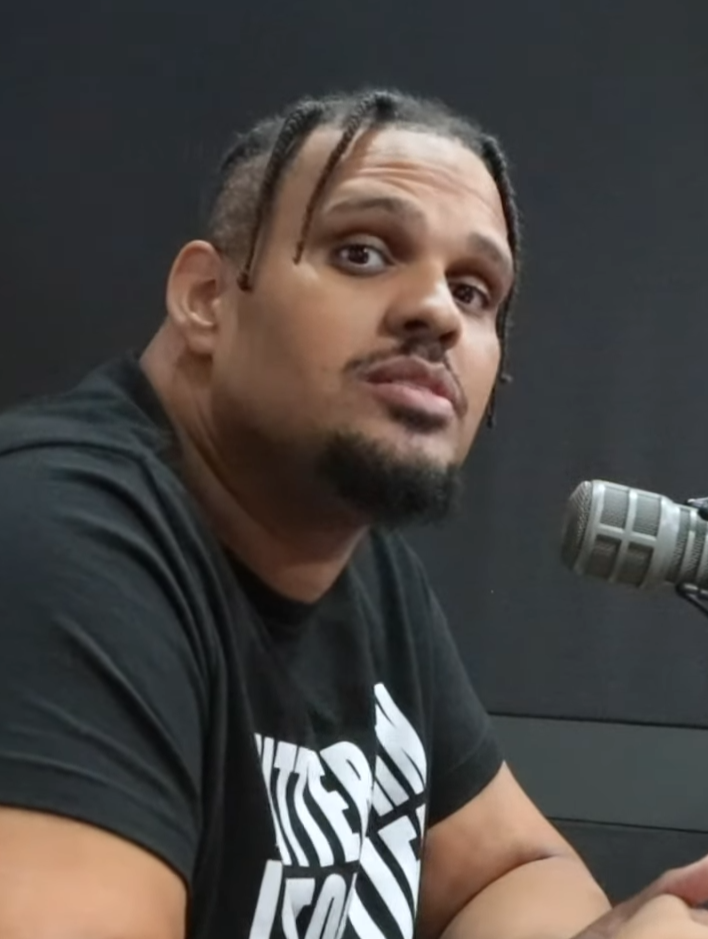
- Riley in 2023

Background information
- Also known as: Club Godzilla
- Born: Justin Seth Riley; November 24, 1984; Houston, Texas, U.S.
- Died: August 15, 2024 (aged 39) Houston, Texas, U.S.
- Genres: Hip hop
- Occupations: Rapper; songwriter; record producer
- Instrument: Vocals
- Years active: 2008–2024
- Label: C3

Justin Seth Riley (November 24, 1984 – August 15, 2024), known professionally as BeatKing and Club Godzilla, was an American rapper, songwriter, and record producer from Houston, Texas. He was known for his viral 2010 single "Crush", the platinum-selling "Thick", and "Then Leave".

Riley began his music career in 2008 and debuted in 2010. Throughout his life, he worked with many artists, including Bun B, Paul Wall, Chamillionaire, Lil' Keke, DJ Chose, and Dorrough, among others.

His manager announced that he died on August 15, 2024, after suffering a pulmonary embolism.

== Discography ==
=== Albums ===
- Never Leave Houston On A Sunday (2024)
- Get Money, B**** (2024)
- She Won't Leave Houston (2023)
- Viral Freestyles (2019)
- 3 Weeks (2019)
- Club God 6 (2019)
- Underground Cassette Tape Music, Vol. 2 (2018)
- Stripper Friends (2018)
- Astroworld 2 (2017)
- Gangsta Stripper Music 3 (2016)
- Club God 5 (2016)
- Texlanta (with Nephew Texas Boy) (2015)
- Club God 4 (2015)
- Underground Cassette Tape Music, Vol. 1 (with Gangsta Boo) (2014)
- Club God 3 (2013)
- Astroworld (2013)
- Club God 2 (2012)
- Club God (2011)
- Kings of the Club 2 (2011)
- Kings of the Club (2010)

=== Charted singles ===
List of singles, with selected peak chart positions
Title	Year	Peak chart positions		Certifications	Album
Title	Year	US	US R&B/HH	Certifications	Album
"Crush"	2011	—	71		Kings of the Club
"Then Leave" (featuring Queendome Come)	2020	— (Note: "Then Leave" did not enter the Billboard Hot 100 but peaked at number two on the Bubbling Under Hot 100 chart.)	48	RIAA: Gold	Gangsta Stripper Music 4
"Thick" (with DJ Chose)	2020	98	33	RIAA: Platinum	Non-album single
