= E.S.G. discography =

- Studio albums: 12
- Compilation albums: 2
- Singles: 8
- Mixtapes: 10

This is a discography of E.S.G., an American hip hop recording artist from Houston, Texas.

As of 2018, for his career, Screwed Up Click descendant Cedric Hill has released 12 studio albums, of which eleven are his solo projects and one album he released in collaboration with Slim Thug. His recent studio album, Kingish, was dropped on June 27, 2015.

== Albums ==
=== Studio albums ===
List of studio albums, with selected chart positions and information
| Year | Title | Peak chart positions | | | Notes |
| Year | Title | US R&B/Hip Hop | US Ind. | US Heat. | Notes |
|---|---|---|---|---|---|
| 1994 | Ocean of Funk: Label: Perrion Records | — | — | — | |
| 1995 | Sailin' Da South: Label: Perrion Entertainment, Priority Records | 29 | — | 19 | |
| 1997 | Return of the Living Dead: Label: Black Hearted Records | 67 | — | — | |
| 1999 | Shinin' n' Grindin': Label: Wreckshop Records | 71 | — | 48 | |
| 2000 | City Under Siege: Label: Wreckshop Records | 65 | 22 | 30 | |
| 2002 | Boss Hogg Outlaws (with Slim Thug): Label: S.E.S. Entertainment | 55 | 16 | 30 | |
| 2004 | All American Gangsta: Label: S.E.S. Entertainment | 73 | — | — | |
| 2006 | Screwed Up Movement: Label: Sure Shot Recordings | — | — | — | |
| 2009 | Digital Dope: The Reintroduction: Label: Gracie Productions | — | — | — | |
| 2009 | Everyday Street Gangsta: Label: E1 Music | 100 | — | — | |
| 2011 | Owner's Manual: Label: G.O.A.T Entertainment, Pyramid Records | — | — | — | |
| 2015 | Kingish: Label: GT Digital, Screwed Up Cartel | — | — | — | |

=== Compilations ===
List of compilation albums, with selected information
| Title | Album details |
|---|---|
| The Chronicles | Released: 2008; Label: Scarred 4 Life Entertainment |
| Greatest Independent Hits | Released: 2009; Label: E1 Music |

=== Mixtapes ===
List of mixtapes, with selected information
| Title | Album details |
|---|---|
| Doin' Dem Boyz (with Southern Made Playaz) | Released: 2001; Label: Stronghold Records |
| Undisputed Underground Volume 1 | Released: 2004; Label: G.F.L. Records |
| Family Business (with Brandon Stacks & Carmen SanDiego) | Released: 2005; Label: S.E.S. Entertainment |
| Hood Hustlin: The Mixtape, Vol. 5 (with Nino) | Released: 2006; Label: 40 West Record |
| Return Of The Freestyle King | Released: 2006; Label: Southern Playaz United |
| Family Business 2 | Released: 2007; Label: S.F.L. |
| Gorilla Grindin Vol. 3 (with Lil Sisco) | Released: 2007; Label: Gorilla Grindin Records |
| Screwed Up Gorillaz (with Big Pokey) | Released: 2008; Label: Southern Playaz United |
| OG Status (with DJ Sedd) | Released: 2009; Label: Mov-A-Ton Records |
| Family Bizness III (Mo Than a Mixtape) | Released: 2011; Label: S.F.L., G.O.A.T Entertainment |

== Singles ==
=== As lead artist ===
List of singles as lead artist, with selected chart positions, showing year released and album name
| Title | Year | Peak chart positions | | | Album |
| Title | Year | Billboard Hot 100 | Hot R&B/Hip-Hop Songs | R&B/Hip-Hop Airplay | Album |
|---|---|---|---|---|---|
| "Swangin' And Bangin'" | 1994 | — | — | — | Ocean of Funk |
| "Can't Forget" / "Don't Touch My Car" | 1997 | — | — | — | Return of the Living Dead |
| "Shinin' N' Grindin'" | 1999 | — | — | — | Shinin' n' Grindin' |
| "City Under Siege" | 2000 | — | — | — | City Under Siege |
| "Getchya Hands Up" (with Slim Thug) | 2001 | — | 80 | 75 | Boss Hogg Outlaws |
| "Thug It Up" / "Rollin" (with Slim Thug) | 2002 | — | — | — | Boss Hogg Outlaws |
| "All American Gangsta" | 2004 | — | — | — | All American Gangsta |
| "Gangsta Anthem" | 2009 | — | — | — | Everyday Street Gangsta |
"—" denotes a recording that did not chart or was not released in that territory.
| "Southside Still Holdin" | 2017 | — | — | — | |

== Guest appearances ==
List of non-single guest appearances, with other performing artists, showing year released and album name
| Title | Year | Other artist(s) | Album |
|---|---|---|---|
| "Swisha Killa" | 1995 | | Legal Dope (Priority Records compilation) |
| "Who Ya Fucking With" | 1998 | Crime Boss, 380, Big Dave, Harry Hay, Pimp Money, T-Dubb | Still At Large |
| "Dirty South" | 1998 | Fat Pat & the Wreckshop Family, Big Steve, Double D, Dren | Throwed in da Game |
| "Do What You Wanna Do" | 1998 | Fat Pat & the Wreckshop Family, D Gotti, Tyte Eyes | Throwed in da Game |
| "Ball (Till Ya Fall)" | 1999 | Mista Madd, Lil' Flip, Harvey Luv, Sabwarfare | Mista Madd & The Supa Thuggz |
| "Mak'n Cash Forever" | 1999 | C-Note, Big Moe, B.G. Gator, Lil' 3rd | Third Coast Born |
| "G-Strangz" | 1999 | C-Note, Big Moe | Third Coast Born |
| "Thug Love" | 1999 | Sean Pymp, Tyte Eyes | All N' Yo Face |
| "Ryde Or Dye" | 1999 | Sean Pymp, Tyte Eyes, Dirty $, Noke D | All N' Yo Face |
| "Ball Caps & Tennis Shoe" | 1999 | The Wreckshop Family, D Gotti, Noke D, Ronnie Spencer | The Dirty 3rd - The Album |
| "Do You Love the Southside" | 1999 | Fat Pat & the Wreckshop Family | The Dirty 3rd - The Album |
| "Shake It" | 1999 | The Wreckshop Family, D Gotti, D-Reck, Noke D, Nutty Black, Ronnie Spencer, Sean Pymp | The Dirty 3rd - The Album |
| "Picture Perfect" | 1999 | The Wreckshop Family, D Gotti, Double D | The Dirty 3rd - The Album |
| "Boss Hawg" | 1999 | The Wreckshop Family, Chicken Hawk, Sean Pymp | The Dirty 3rd - The Album |
| "Life of ESG" | 1999 | The Wreckshop Family | The Dirty 3rd - The Album |
| "Mash for Cash" | 1999 | The Wreckshop Family, D Gotti, Double D | The Dirty 3rd - The Album |
| "Nu World Order" | 1999 | The Wreckshop Family, D Gotti, D-Reck, Dirty $ | The Dirty 3rd - The Album |
| "Made Niggas" | 1999 | The Wreckshop Family, D Gotti, Dirty $ | The Dirty 3rd - The Album |
| "Behind Closed Dozes" | 1999 | Big Steve, Big Pokey | My Testimony |
| "Friends Turns Foes" | 1999 | Lil' O, Enjoli, Al-D | Blood Money |
| "Chop Chop" | 1999 | H.$.E. | Hustlaz Stackin' Endz |
| "G'z N' Ballaz" | 1999 | H.$.E. | Hustlaz Stackin' Endz |
| "You Got Me Hustlin" | 1999 | 4-Trey | Prophecy of Profits |
| "What Fo" | 2000 | Lil' O, Big Moe | Da Fat Rat wit da Cheeze |
| "Bend Ya Knees, Touch Ya Toes (Do Ya Thang)" | 2000 | Lil' O, Carmen SanDiego | Da Fat Rat wit da Cheeze |
| "Cash" | 2000 | D Gotti, Tyte Eyes | Street Sermon |
| "Country Life" | 2000 | South Park Mexican | Time Is Money |
| "Realest Rhymin'" | 2000 | Lil' Flip, Slim Thug | The Leprechaun |
| "We Da' Shit!" | 2000 | Big Moe, Z-Ro | City of Syrup |
| "We Thoed" | 2000 | Mista Madd | Can I Live? |
| "Luv It Main" | 2000 | C-Note, Big Hawk | Third Coast Born 2000 |
| "I Can Make You Dance" | 2000 | Big Hawk, Lil' Keke, C-Note, DJ Screw | Under Hawk's Wings |
| "Love For Ya" | 2001 | Lil' Keke, Slim Thug | Platinum in da Ghetto |
| "Turn It Up" (Remix) | 2005 | Chamillionaire, Big Hawk, Lil' O | The Sound of Revenge |
| "The Legendary DJ Screw" | 2013 | Bun B, C-Note, Trae tha Truth, Lil' O, Z-Ro, Big Hawk | Trill OG: The Epilogue |
