= Unfinished Business (Big Moe album) =

Studio album by Big Moe
- Released: March 18, 2008
- Genre: Hip hop
- Length: 1:05:49
- Label: Wreckshop Records; Koch Records
- Producer: Mama Moe; Kojak; Tigga Man; Tomar Williams; A-3; C-Los; Cory Mo; G. Sharp; Joe Traxx; Michael Wilson; Rapture Ent.; Sean Blaze; Phillip Moore

Big Moe chronology
Moe Life... (2003)	Unfinished Business (2008)

Professional ratings
Review scores
Source	Rating
PopMatters	7/10 stars
RapReviews	7/10 stars

Unfinished Business is the fourth and final studio album by American rapper and Screwed Up Click member Big Moe. It was released on March 18, 2008, via Wreckshop Records, Koch Records and Doc Music Group. It was released posthumously, after Moe's death in 2007. The album peaked at #73 on the US Billboard Top R&B/Hip-Hop Albums.

== Track listing ==
No.	Title	Producer(s)	Length
1.	"Intro" (featuring Dylon D & Kaila Patton)	Tigga Man	1:56
2.	"Big M.O.E" (featuring Tyte Eyes & Dirty $)	Phillip Moore; Sean Blaze	4:45
3.	"Man" (featuring Lil' Flip, Mike D & A-3)	A-3; Rapture Ent.	4:05
4.	"Skit" (featuring Mama Moe)		0:36
5.	"Ride Candy" (featuring A-3, Adonis, Mike D, Sean Pymp & Toya)	G. Sharp; Kojak	4:30
6.	"Out of Live" (featuring Dirty $, A-3 & Tyte Eyes)	Tomar Williams	5:27
7.	"Bigga Figga's" (featuring Big Pokey & A-3)	Kojak; Tigga Man	4:24
8.	"Skit"		3:24
9.	"Pill Poppa" (featuring J Dog, Mike D & Trae'100)	Kojak	5:23
10.	"Won't Fold" (featuring C-Note, D-Red & Lil' O)	Cory Mo	4:48
11.	"The Letter" (featuring Toya & Michael Wilson)	Michael Wilson	3:23
12.	"Do Anything" (featuring Tigga Man & Nac)	Tomar Williams	4:48
13.	"Skit" (Mama Moe)		1:07
14.	"Holdin'" (featuring Big Pokey, Lil' Flip & Tyte Eyes)	Kojak; Tigga Man	4:32
15.	"Love It Man" (featuring Sean Pymp & Tyte Eyes)	C-Los	3:55
16.	"Grindin'" (featuring Z-Ro & C-Mo)	Joe Traxx	3:57
17.	"Jammin' for the South" (Dirty $, Tigga Man & A-3)	Tigga Man	4:49
Total length:			1:05:49

== Charts ==
Chart (2008)	Peak position
US Top R&B/Hip-Hop Albums (Billboard)	73
