= 3 'n the Mornin' (Part Two) =

Compilation album by DJ Screw
- Released: August 27, 1995
- Studio: Samplified Digital (Houston, TX)
- Genres: Chopped and screwed; gangsta rap
- Length: 59:15
- Label: Bigtyme Recordz
- Producers: Mr. Bigtyme (exec.); DJ Screw

DJ Screw chronology
Bigtyme Recordz, Vol. II: All Screwed Up (1995)	3 'n the Mornin' (Part Two) (1995)	All Work No Play (1999)

Professional ratings
Review scores
Source	Rating
AllMusic	3/5 stars

3 'n the Mornin' (Part Two) is a 1995 album by southern hip hop artist DJ Screw. It contains a collection of songs by Dirty South artists remixed using Screw's trademark chopped and screwed style.

Part Two is one of Screw's best known CDs. Houston Press called it one of the best Houston rap albums of all time.

== Track listing ==
No.	Title	Length
1.	"Watch Yo Screw" (featuring E.S.G.)	1:56
2.	"Sailin' Da South" (featuring E.S.G.)	3:24
3.	"Smokin' and Leanin'" (featuring Botany Boyz)	6:36
4.	"No Way Out" (featuring Al-D)	6:10
5.	"Foe Life" (featuring Mack-10)	1:54
6.	"Servin a Duce" (featuring 20-2-Life & Klondike Kat)	5:24
7.	"Sippin Codine" (featuring Big Moe)	1:17
8.	"Elbows Swangin" (featuring .380)	4:51
9.	"High With the Blanksta" (featuring Point Blank & PSK-13)	6:11
10.	"G Ride" (featuring E.S.G. & Flava)	4:07
11.	"Why You Hatin Me" (featuring Al-D)	2:55
12.	"Cloverland" (featuring Botany Boyz)	4:16
13.	"Pimp Tha Pen" (featuring Lil' Keke)	3:13
14.	"South Side" (featuring Mass 187)	7:01
Total length:		59:15

== Personnel ==
- Robert Earl Davis Jr. – main artist, producer, mixing, assistant engineering
- Cedric Dormaine Hill – featured artist (tracks: 1, 2, 10)
- Albert Driver – featured artist (tracks: 4, 11)
- Botany Boyz – featured artists (tracks: 3, 12)
- Dedrick D'Mon Rolison – featured artist (track 5)
- Derek Woods – featured artist (track 6)
- Andre Parish – featured artist (track 6)
- Killa Hoe – featured artist (track 6)
- Kenneth Doniell Moore – featured artist (track 7)
- Jerald Morgan – featured artist (track 8)
- 2-Fancy – featured artist (track 8)
- Reginald Gilliand – featured artist (track 9)
- JT Thomas – featured artist (track 9)
- Flava – featured artist (track 10)
- Marcus Lakee Edwards – featured artist (track 13)
- Brew – featured artist (track 14)
- Flo – featured artist (track 14)
- Spike – featured artist (track 14)
- JOS – featured artist (track 14)
- Russell Washington – executive producer
- Keenan Lyles – engineering
- Eddie Coleman – management
- Pen & Pixel – artwork & design

== Charts ==
Chart (1996)	Peak position
US Top R&B/Hip-Hop Albums (Billboard)	52
US Heatseekers Albums (Billboard)	33
