= Ghetto Dreams (album) =

Studio album by Fat Pat
- Released: March 17, 1998
- Recorded: 1997–98
- Studio: J2 Recording Studio (Houston, TX)
- Genre: Southern hip hop
- Length: 1:11:16
- Label: Wreckshop Records
- Producer: D-Reck (exec.); Double D; Noke D; Sean "Solo" Jemison; Prowla; Big Swift; J Slash

Fat Pat chronology
Ghetto Dreams (1998)	Throwed in da Game (1998)

Singles from Ghetto Dreams
- 1. "Tops Drop" Released: February 26, 1998

Professional ratings
Review scores
Source	Rating
RapReviews	7/10

Ghetto Dreams is the debut solo studio album by American rapper Fat Pat of Screwed Up Click. It was released on March 17, 1998 through Wreckshop Records, making it his first posthumous release following his death on February 3, 1998. Recording sessions took place at J2 Recording Studio in his hometown of Houston, Texas. Production was handled by Double D, Noke D, Sean "Solo" Jemison, Prowler, Big Swift and J Slash, with D-Reck serving as executive producer. It features guest appearances from Big Hawk, Big Moe, Big Pokey, Big Steve, Billy Cook, C-Note, Corey-B, Double D, Lil' Keke, Mike D, Ronnie Spencer, Sean Pymp & Tyte Eyes. The album peaked at number 39 on the US Billboard Top R&B/Hip-Hop Albums and number 19 on the Top Heatseekers, supported by a single "Tops Drop", which made it to #10 on the Bubbling Under Hot 100.

== Track listing ==
No.	Title	Producer(s)	Length
1.	"Am I a Playa"	Double D	3:10
2.	"Body Roc" (featuring Big Steve)	Double D	5:39
3.	"Peep N Me" (featuring Lil' KeKe & Ronnie Spencer)	Double D	3:40
4.	"3rd Coast" (featuring C-Note)	Sean "Solo" Jemison	4:29
5.	"Reality"	Prowla	4:34
6.	"Superstar" (featuring Mike D & Billy Cook)	Big Swift	4:23
7.	"I'm Tha Man" (featuring Sean Pymp & Tyte Eyes)	Noke D	3:36
8.	"Ghetto Dreams"	Noke D	5:36
9.	"Why They Hatin' Us" (featuring Double D)	Double D	4:03
10.	"Pymp Tyte" (performed by Sean Pymp & Tyte Eyes)	Noke D	3:28
11.	"Tha Last Man Standin'"	Double D	4:05
12.	"Tops Drop"	J Slash	4:12
13.	"Do U Like What U See" (featuring Big Pokey & Double D)	Double D	4:32
14.	"5X" (performed by Sean Pymp & Tyte Eyes)	Noke D	5:17
15.	"Friends We Know" (featuring Corey-B)	Sean "Solo" Jemison	4:25
16.	"Missing Our G's" (featuring Big Hawk, Double D & Big Moe)	Double D	6:07
Total length:			1:11:16

== Charts ==
Chart (1998)	Peak position
US Top R&B/Hip-Hop Albums (Billboard)	39
US Heatseekers Albums (Billboard)	19
