= Screwed Up Click =

American hip hop group

- Also known as: Soldiers United 4 Cash; S.U.C.
- Origin: Houston, Texas, U.S.
- Genres: Chopped and screwed; Southern rap
- Years active: 1990–present
- Label: Screwed Up Records
- Members: Al-D; B.G. Duke; Big Troy; Botany Boyz; Chris Ward; C-Note; Enjoli; E.S.G. Kay-K; Lil' Flip; Lil' Head; Lil' Keke; Lil' O Lil' 3rd Mike D Southside Playaz; Yungstar; Z-Ro
- Past members: B.G. Gator; Big Hawk; Big Jut; Big Mello; Big Moe; Big Pokey; Big Steve (GrandPappy Mafioso); DJ Screw; Fat Pat; Macc Grace (Dat Boy Grace); Mr. 3-2; Big Floyd

The Screwed Up Click (or S.U.C.) is an American hip hop collective based in Houston, Texas, that was led by DJ Screw. Its most notable members include DJ Screw, Big Hawk, Big Mello, Big Moe, Big Pokey, the Botany Boyz, E.S.G., Fat Pat, Lil' Flip, Lil' Keke, Mr. 3-2, Lil' O, and Z-Ro. In addition, Devin the Dude, K-Rino, Lil' Troy, South Park Mexican and UGK are considered to be "Screwed Up Affiliated". Many of the current and former SUC members come from the neighborhoods of South Park, 3rd Ward, Sunnyside, Cloverland, Hiram Clarke and South Acres.

== History ==
In the early 1990s, a new type of music began gaining popularity in Houston, collectively called "Chopped and screwed", which was pioneered by DJ Screw. The sound was created from a turntable technique in which Screw slowed down the tempo and torqued with parts of hip-hop anthems, giving them a new hypnotic & mesmerizing sound which he believed also made the lyrics easier to understand. DJ screw gave many credits of his music to Mari. In 1991, he began to release tapes, known as "Screw Tapes", on which he slowed down and manipulated records by popular artists and also prominently included freestyles by a group of friends and local rappers, who came to be known as the Screwed Up Click.

In 1994, Screw moved into a house in the eastern park of South Park, which soon came to be known as "The Screw House", where he could conduct his new business of selling tapes and recording freestyles with the group. These tapes quickly gained popularity in the area, allowing many of the group's members to launch successful solo careers. At some point the business became too much for the house, so the group relocated its operations to a store in Missouri City that became known as "The Screw Shop". After years of success that took its members to new heights, the S.U.C. found itself surrounded by tragedy when two of its members died, Fat Pat who was murdered and DJ Screw who overdosed from a lethal combination of codeine and other drugs. However, the group still continues to record new music with many of its members now focusing primarily on their solo careers. In later years, the group saw the deaths of other members including Big Hawk and Big Moe in 2006 and 2007 respectively, as well as the incarceration of others.

More recently in 2010, the S.U.C. had a reunion tour in 2010 which included Big Pokey, Lil' Keke, Lil' O and Z-Ro. In 2014, several members of the group appeared on the track "The Legendary DJ Screw" from Bun B's fourth studio album Trill OG: The Epilogue, including a posthumous verse from Big Hawk.

== Original members ==
This is a list of all of the original members of the Screwed Up Click.

=== Al-D ===
Albert Driver, better known by his stage name Al-D, is a member of the Screwed Up Click. Though not biologically, he is commonly known as DJ Screw's brother. His first album release is "Home Of The Free" from 1995 and has released other projects since then. Current single via digital only release is Ballaz Featuring – E.S.G., Griddy Vocalz, Mo City Don. 2015 will see the release of his new album yet to be announced.

=== Big Hawk ===
John Edward Hawkins, better known as H.A.W.K. or Big Hawk was one of the founding members of the Screwed Up Click. He grew up on the dead end block of MLK with younger brother, Patrick "Fat Pat" Hawkins and two sisters. He started rapping in 1992 when Fat Pat took him to DJ Screw's house, an upcoming mixtape producer and DJ in the southern area of Houston. In 1994 Hawk, Fat Pat, DJ Screw, and Kay-K, collaborated to form the group D.E.A. and Dead End Records. In late 1998 D.E.A. released an original independent album entitled, “Screwed For Life”. In 1999 Hawk participated in a Southside Playaz compilation album titled You Got Us Fuxxed Up, with Mike D, Claydoe and other members of the S.U.C. Hawk released his solo album, Under Hawk's Wings on Dead End Records in 2000 and was featured on the Lil' Troy hit "Wanna Be A Baller". He also collaborated with Lil' O on the hit song, "Back Back". Next, he partnered with Game Face Records in 2002 and released his first album under his label Ghetto Dreams Ent., self-titled, HAWK. With the hit song, "U Already Know", the album charted the Billboard's list of top R&B and Rap Albums at #45. On May 1, 2006, Hawkins, 36, was shot to death outside of a home in Houston. Police were unable to find any witnesses that could provide information on a suspect or a motive for the shooting.

=== Big Moe ===
Kenneth Doniell Moore, better known as Big Moe, was known for a softer and slower style than other Houston rappers, including a mixture of rapping and singing that he called "rapsinging" as well as for his music that celebrated codeine-laced syrup as a recreational drug. As one of the founding members of the "Original Screwed Up Click," Big Moe started out in music by freestyling on DJ Screw mixtapes before being signed to Wreckshop Records. He would go on to release three albums with Wreckshop Records, City of Syrup in 2000, Purple World in 2002 and then Moe Life in 2003. Moe died on October 14, 2007, at 33 years old, after suffering a heart attack one week earlier that left him in a coma. There was speculation that recreational codeine use in the form of Purple Drank may have contributed to his death.

=== Big Pokey ===
Milton Powell, better known as Big Pokey, was one of the original members of the Screwed Up Click. He joined up with DJ Screw in the early 1990s and started releasing songs on DJ Screw's many mixtapes. His first full-length album appeared in early 1999, "Hardest Pit in the Litter". The following year, Pokey returned with "D-Game" 2000, another album of mid-tempo 808-driven beats featuring several of his Houston peers as guests. In 2005 he was featured in a song which was #93 on US Top 100 with Paul Wall called Sittin' Sidewayz. He has since released many other albums and mixtapes. He collapsed on stage in Beaumont, TX on June 17, 2023 and was pronounced dead.

=== Botany Boyz ===
The Botany Boyz are the rap group which included rappers Big D-E-Z, B.G. Duke, B.G. Gator, C-Note, D-Red, Lil' 3rd, Pap-Pap and Will-Lean. One of the foremost contributors to the Houston screw scene, the group was part of the Screwed Up Click in the early to mid 1990s. The group name is a reference to Botany Lane in the Cloverland area of Houston where they resided. Their first album, Thought of Many Ways, was released on their own label, Big Shot Records, in 1997; its follow-up, Forever Botany, was released in 1999 and managed to crack the Billboard Top R&B/Hip-Hop charts at #99 in 2000 as the Houston rap scene became more popular across the US. Since then, the members have concentrated more on solo projects, with C-Note being the most successful. Since the group's creation members Big D-E-Z, Lil 3rd, and Pap-Pap have left the group as well as member B.G. Gator, who committed suicide on Mother's Day a year after his mom died.

=== DJ Screw ===
Robert Earl Davis, Jr. also known as DJ Screw was a central figure in the Houston hip hop community and was the creator of the now-famous Chopped and Screwed DJ technique. This creation led to his nickname of "The Originator". During the early 1990s, he invited some of the Houston emcees from the city's south side to rhyme on those mixes. He was also a member of the rap group Dead End Alliance. This eventually led to the formation of the Screwed Up Click. DJ Screw died on November 16, 2000 from a lethal combination of codeine and other drugs. Since his death, DJ Screw has had a considerable influence in the Houston scene, which is sometimes referred to as "Screwston" in his memory. His distinct musical stylings influenced countless rap acts. Alternative weekly The Houston Press named the 1995 album 3 'n the Mornin' (Part Two) as no. 13 on its list of the 25 best Houston rap albums of all time. The newspaper credited the release for the way it helped shape Houston's hip-hop culture. The newspaper also referred to Chopped and Screwed music as the second most likely type of music to be associated with Texas, an example of DJ Screw's influence in the region.

=== E.S.G. ===
Cedric Dormaine Hill, better known by his stage name E.S.G. (which stands for Everyday Street Gangsta), is a rapper originally from Bogalusa, Louisiana. He helped to popularize the "chopped and screwed" style of rap music. His debut album Ocean of Funk was released in 1994 and he released albums regularly since then.

=== Fat Pat ===
Patrick Lamark Hawkins, better known by his stage name Fat Pat, was a member of Dead End Alliance with his brother John "Big Hawk" Hawkins, DJ Screw and Kay-K, all original members of the Screwed Up Click. He released two albums with Wreckshop Records in 1998, Ghetto Dreams and Throwed In Da Game, On February 3, 1998, Hawkins was fatally shot in Houston, TX, after going to a promoter's apartment to collect an appearance fee. Eight years later, his brother rapper Big Hawk was also shot to death.

=== Kay-K ===
Kay-K also known as Shakey Red was an original member of the Screwed Up Click and a founding member of the Dead End Alliance, which also included DJ Screw, Fat Pat, & Big Hawk.

=== Ronnie Spencer ===
Ronnie Spencer is well known for singing the hook for UGK hit single "ONE DAY" featuring 3-2, along with other classic hits with Big Moe, Big Pokey, ESG, Botany Boyz & more...

=== Lil' Keke ===
Marcus Lakee Edwards, better known by his stage name Lil' Keke, is an original member of the Southern hip hop collective Screwed Up Click. Lil' Keke gained national underground love with his track "Southside" from his 1997 release "Don't Mess Wit Texas". In 2005, Lil' Keke signed to Swishahouse Records. In an interview with HitQuarters at the time, label president and A&R T. Farris said, "He is a legend here in Houston. He plays a big role in the whole style of rap that we make down here."

=== Lil' O ===
Ore Magnus Lawson, better known by his stage name Lil' O, was born in Lagos, Nigeria and raised in Southwest Houston, Texas. He is an original member of Screwed Up Click. He is known for his short stature, being 5 feet tall, from which he earned the nickname "Da Fat Rat Wit Da Cheeze". While studying at Xavier University of Louisiana in New Orleans in 1997, he recorded “Can’t Stop”, which featured vocal contributions from the ladies that would go on to earn renown as Destiny's Child. The track soon became Lil’ O's debut single and went on to score an instant local hit. In 1999, he signed with the Houston-based indie label Game Face Entertainment, from which he released his debut album, Blood Money, which went on to sell 20,000 copies. In 2001, his album Da Fat Rat Wit Da Cheeze sold over 75,000. He collaborated with Big Hawk on the hit single "Back Back", which led to a nationwide deal with Atlantic Records, which he later left in 2003.

=== Mike D ===
Michael Dixon, better known by his stage name Mike D (also known as Bosshog Corleone or Dickbone Corleone), is a rapper based out of Houston, Texas, who along with Clay Doe, Fat Pat and Mr. 3–2, formed the rap group Southside Playaz. Mike D was able to create a lot of tracks with Fat Pat before his death, which are still included on new Southside Playaz CDs to this day. He is also responsible for artists like Big Baby Flava and his son Little Mike D.

On December 31, 2024, rapper 2 Low accidentally fired his gun while on Mike D's podcast, One on One W/ Mike D.

== Other members ==
This is a list of all of the known past and present members who joined the Screwed Up Click after its creation.

=== Big Floyd ===
George Floyd was raised in Houston and briefly rapped with the group in the mid-1990s. He later joined a group called Presidential Playas which released one album in 2000. On May 25, 2020, he was murdered in police custody in Minneapolis in an incident that led to worldwide protests and riots.

=== Big Jut ===
Big Jut is a member of the Screwed Up Click who was also DJ Screw's and many of the other members’ personal barber. He was also the one to introduce some rappers to Screw, such as Dat Boy Grace, who later joined the group. He released an album titled Screwed Up Fo Life in 2004.

=== Big Mello ===
Curtis Donnell Davis, better known by his stage name Big Mello, was a member of the Screwed Up Click. He debuted as Big Mello in 1992 with the album "Bone Hard Zaggin'" on the Rap-A-Lot Records label. Shea Serrano of the Houston Press said that Big Mello was famous for "repping Hiram Clarke in the 90's[...]" On June 15, 2002, Mello, along with a passenger died after he lost control of his vehicle and hit a pillar in the 4500 block of South Loop West In Houston.

=== Big Rue ===
Big Rue was a member of the Screwed Up Click. He was also one of the founding members of M.O.B. Style Protected. He is deceased.

=== Big Steve ===
Big Steve, also known as Granpappy Mafioso, was a member of the Screwed Up Click. He was also a founding member of the group "Woss Ness" with Rasir X and Mista Luv. He was murdered two years after the group's debut album "Da Game Done Changed”.

=== Bird ===
Reggie "Bird" Oliver is a member of the Screwed Up Click. He met DJ Screw in 1989 and they became close friends. While Screw sold tapes out of his house, he asked Bird to stand behind the door with a gun. Screw's friend Toe commissioned the first tape and then played it for Bird, who was among the first to commission a second round of tapes.

=== Chris Ward ===
One of the last added members of the Screwed Up Click. He is also part of the group Boss Hogg Outlawz with Slim Thug.

=== Clay Doe ===
Clay Doe is a rapper based out of Houston, Texas, who along with Mike D, Fat Pat and Mr. 3–2, formed the rap group Southside Playaz.

=== Dat Boy Grace ===
Charles Grace, professionally known as Dat Boy Grace or Macc Grace, as well as his brother Lo$, were members of the Screwed Up Click, in which he developed a long time friendship with DJ Screw. He was introduced to Screw by his barber, Big Jut, a fellow Screwed Up Click member. Grace died in 2017.

=== Enjoli ===
Enjoli, also known as First Lady of the SUC, earned her title by rapping on DJ Screw's Underground Chapters. She was a close friend of fellow Houston rapper Big Moe and appeared on his albums City of Syrup, on the track "I Wonder", and Purple World, on the track "The Letter". She also made an appearance on rapper Z-Ro's album Z-Ro vs. the World on the track "Dirty 3rd".

=== Herschelwood Hardheadz ===
The Herschelwood Hardheadz, named after the south side Houston Texas neighborhood they grew up in, is a group that was a part of the Screwed Up Click and was formed in 1993. Its members included Duke, Knocky, Archie Lee and formerly Lil' Keke.

=== Lil Flip ===
Wesley Eric Weston, Jr., better known by his stage name Lil' Flip, is a rapper and member of the Screwed Up Click. He gained early popularity from the title "The Freestyle King", given to him by Screw himself. In 2000, Lil' Flip independently released his first album titled The Leprechaun In 2002, Columbia Records offered Flip a contract and Suckafree a distribution deal. Lil Flip released his debut studio album Undaground Legend on August 27, 2002. The album was certified Platinum in December 2002. It contained his hit single "The Way We Ball". When Lil' Flip's label Columbia tried to restructure Flip, he left, ending up at Sony Urban Music which he believed could promote his music better. The first single from the album was "Game Over (Flip)". After that he quickly released his second single, "Sunshine" featuring Lea Sunshine. This album sold 198,000 domestic copies in its first week and was certified double Platinum by August 2004. Lil' Flip released his third album I Need Mine in 2007. The album debuted at number 15 on the Billboard 200 with 43,000 copies sold in its first week. Lil' Flip has since left Columbia Records and gone back to being an independent artist, founding his own label Clover G records. His fourth album Ahead of My Time was originally set to be released as early as 2007, but was pushed back many times and was finally released on July 6, 2010. Lil' Flip released two "album-before-the-album's" in 2009 to help promote the release of Ahead of My Time. The two albums were: Respect Me and Underground Legend 2. Lil' Flip released his fifth album The Black Dr. Kevorkian on October 31, 2013, which sold 10,000 copies in its first week.

=== Los ===
Carlos Grace, professionally known as Los or Loco Bush, was a member of the Screwed Up Click and younger brother of Macc Grace. Together the two formed Grace Boyz. Grace was a starting member of the Willowridge High School (Houston) 1994 Men's Basketball State Championship team. He was the teams feature three point shooter and best defensive guard. Introduced to Screw along with his brother, Los started rapping on Screw Tapes. More recently since the death of his brother, Macc Grace, Los has put out several new projects, most of which pay tribute to Macc and Screw. Los also has a son of the same name who plays Division 2 football in college as a running back.

=== Mr. 3-2 ===
Christopher Juel Barriere, professionally known as Mr. 3-2, was a member of the Screwed Up Click. While signed to Rap-A-Lot Records he was involved with three groups, The Convicts, Southside Playaz and Blac Monks, and released one solo album. After leaving Rap-A-Lot, Mr. 3-2 released albums on "N Yo Face" and "Street Game Records." He has collaborated on tracks with UGK, Scarface, South Park Mexican, Too $hort, 8Ball & MJG. He has done numerous underground mixtapes that circulate throughout underground rap in the South. On November 10, 2016, he was shot in the back of the head at a Southwest Houston gas station.

=== Yungstar ===
Yungstar is a member of the Screwed Up Click who began rapping around age ten. In the early 1990s, he began working with DenDen, CEO of Straight Profit Records. He emerged nationally with a guest appearance on Lil' Troy's "Wanna Be a Baller". He then went on to release the hit song "Knocking Pictures Off The Wall" with Lil' Flex.

=== DJ Zo tha Affiliate ===
DJ Zo is DJ Screw's second cousin. He was also an affiliated DJ for Chalie Boy. Today, he continues to work as an on-air personality for radio stations and puts out CDs. He also owns a mobile DJ company.

=== Z-Ro ===
Joseph Wayne McVey, better known by his stage names Z-Ro and The Mo City Don, is a member of the Screwed Up Click. In 1998, Z-Ro released his debut album, Look What You Did to Me. He celebrated his 22nd birthday at DJ Screw's house, recording the "Blue 22" tape. These things helped to escalate Z-Ro's popularity throughout the South and by 2002 his talent and hard work caught the attention of Rap-A-Lot’s founder and CEO James Prince, who offered him a deal. In 2004, Z-Ro released his critically acclaimed Rap-A-Lot debut titled The Life of Joseph W. McVey. The record was a huge success and helped expand Z-Ro’s fan base beyond the South. In 2005, Z-Ro released Let the Truth Be Told, which was well received. Z-Ro's 2006 album I'm Still Livin' was released while he was imprisoned for drug possession, to positive reviews. It was called "a great album... powerful" but "relentlessly bleak" by The Village Voice and "one of the best rap albums to come out of Houston" by the Houston Chronicle. He was named one of America's most underrated rappers by The New York Times in 2007. In 2010 he released his next album titled Heroin, which was followed by another new album titled Meth in 2011 and then Angel Dust in 2012. After a series of mixtapes, released sporadically over three years, Z-Ro has returned with a proper studio album entitled Melting the Crown. Following that album he recorded his most recent episode of albums entitled “Drankin and Drivin" in 2016.

== Discography ==
=== Studio albums ===
- Blockbleeders (1999)
- Making History (2005)
- The Takeover (2014)
