= I Had a Ghetto Dream =

I Had A Ghetto Dream

Studio album by Fat Pat
- Released: November 4, 2008
- Recorded: 2008
- Genre: Southern hip hop
- Length: 72:53
- Label: Screwed Up Click Entertainment

Fat Pat chronology
Since The Gray Tapes Vol. 2 (2005)	I Had A Ghetto Dream (2008)

I Had A Ghetto Dream is a posthumous album by southern rapper Fat Pat.

== Track listing ==
1. "Da Incredible"
2. "In This Life"
3. "Screwed For Life" (D.E.A.)
4. "Gotta Make My Dreams"
5. "Is There A Better Place"
6. "Peep N Me" (featuring Lil' Keke & Ronnie Spencer)
7. "Do You Love The Southside" (featuring E.S.G.)
8. "I Wanna Be Down"
9. "M.O.B." (Southside Playaz)
10. "All The Way To The Top"
11. "Tops Drop"
12. "Stackin' Big Paper"
13. "Do U Like What U See" (featuring Double D & Big Pokey)
14. "I Miss My Pat""
15. "Too Hott" (Southside Playaz featuring Ronnie Spencer, C-Note, Big Moe, Lil' O, Al-D, Big Pokey, Will-Lean, Lil' Keke, Big Steve & Big Hawk)
