= Wreckshop Records =

American Houston-based indie record label, founded in 1997

- Founded: 1997
- Founder: Derrick Dixon
- Distributor(s): Wreckshop Nation
- Genre: Southern hip hop, gangsta rap
- Country of origin: United States
- Location: Houston, Texas
- Official website: wreckshopnation.com

Wreckshop Records is an American independent record label based in Houston, Texas. Founded in 1997 by Derrick "D-Reck" Dixon, the label specializing in southern hip hop music. Artists such as Fat Pat, Big Moe, E.S.G., Pymp Tyte and Big Pokey have released records through Wreckshop.

== Artists ==
- A-3
- Big Moe, a member of Screwed Up Click
- Big Pokey, a member of Screwed Up Click
- Chicken Hawk, a member of Platinum Soul Productions
- D Gotti
- Dirty $
- Donald D, a member of Platinum Soul Productions
- D-Reck
- E.S.G., a member of Screwed Up Click
- Fat Pat, a member of Screwed Up Click
- Noke D, a member of Platinum Soul Productions
- Pymp Tyte, a hip hop duo composed of rappers Sean Pymp and Tyte Eyes
- Ronnie Spencer
- Tyte Eyes
- Wreckshop Family/Wreckshop Wolfpack

Producers

- Platinum Soul Productions, a hip hop production trio composed of Chicken Hawk, Donald D and Noke D

== Discography ==
Artist	Album	Details
Fat Pat	Ghetto Dreams	Released: March 17, 1998; Chart positions: #39 U.S. R&B
Fat Pat & Wreckshop Family	Throwed in da Game	Released: April 7, 1998; Chart positions: —
E.S.G.	Shinin' n' Grindin'	Released: March 9, 1999; Chart positions: #71 U.S. R&B
Pymp Tyte	All N' Yo Face	Released: July 13, 1999; Chart positions: —
Big Moe	City of Syrup	Released: November 16, 1999; Chart positions: #176 U.S., #52 U.S. R&B
Wreckshop Family	The Dirty 3rd: The Album	Released: 1999; Chart positions: #99 U.S. R&B
E.S.G.	City Under Siege	Released: April 25, 2000; Chart positions: #65 U.S. R&B
D Gotti	Street Sermon	Released: October 3, 2000; Chart positions: —
Fat Pat	Fat Pat's Greatest Hits	Released: February 13, 2001; Chart positions: #76 U.S. R&B
Wreckshop Family	Ack'n A Azz	Released: April 10, 2001; Chart positions: #73 U.S. R&B
Big Pokey & Wreckshop Wolfpack	Tha Collabo	Released: November 6, 2001; Chart positions: #74 U.S. R&B
Big Moe	Purple World (released with Priority and Capitol)	Released: April 23, 2002; Chart positions: #29 U.S., #3 U.S. R&B
Big Pokey	Da Sky's da Limit	Released: August 20, 2002; Chart positions: #47 U.S. R&B
Big Moe	Moe Life...	Released: May 27, 2003; Chart positions: #33 U.S. R&B
Wreckshop Family	Doin' It Fa Texas	Released: August 3, 2004; Chart positions: —
Big Moe	Unfinished Business (released with Koch)	Released: March 18, 2008; Chart positions: #73 U.S. R&B
Z-Ro	Call Me Rother (released with One Deep Entertainment)	Released: December 13, 2024; Chart positions: —

== Filmography ==
- The Dirty 3rd: The Movie (directed by Henry LeBlanc)
- The Dirty Third 2: Home Sweet Home
- Ghetto Dreams (directed by Lionz I)
- Mann! The Movie
