= Lean (drug) =

Recreational drug beverage

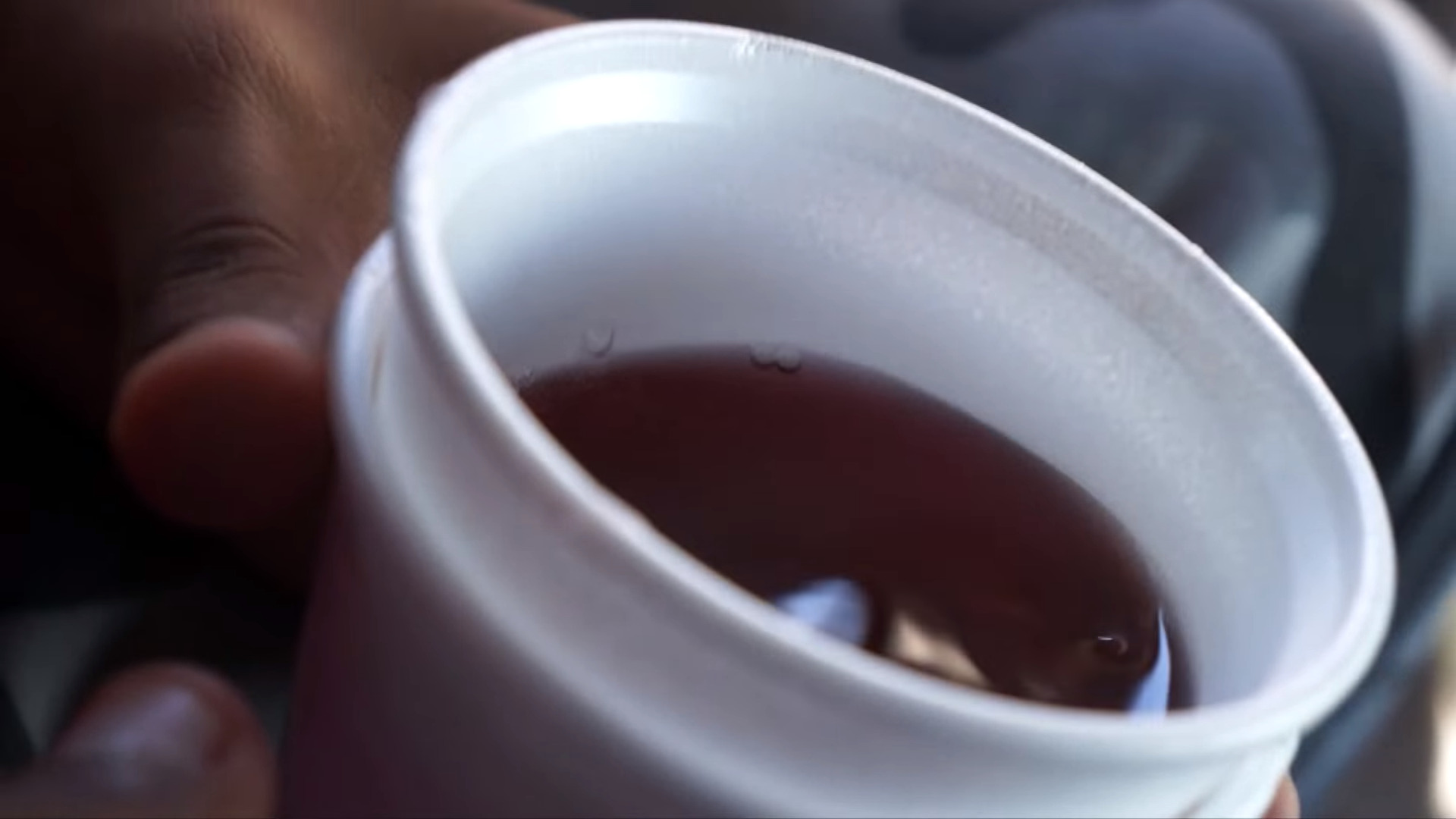
- Type: Polysubstance drink
- Origin: Southern United States
- Introduced: 1960s
- Colour: Purple, red, green, or yellow; varies based on cough syrup brand and soda mixer
- Ingredients: Opioid cough syrup, soft drink
- Related products: Dextromethorphan syrup

Lean or purple drank (known by numerous local and street names) is a polysubstance drink used as a recreational drug. It is prepared by mixing prescription-grade cough or cold syrup containing an opioid drug and an antihistamine drug with a soft drink and sometimes hard candy. The beverage originated in Houston as early as the 1960s and is popular in hip-hop culture, especially within the Southern United States. Codeine/promethazine syrup is usually used to make lean, but other syrups are also used.

Users of lean are at risk of addiction, and serious complications include respiratory depression, respiratory arrest, and cardiac arrest. Lean is especially dangerous when consumed with alcohol.

== Names ==
The term lean refers to the tendency for users to have difficulty standing up straight and walking while under the influence of the drug. "Purple drank" references the mixture's typically purple hue, as the cough syrups employed are often purple in color, and the African-American Vernacular English term "drank" for an alcoholic beverage. Other names include "syrup/sizzurp", "surp/zurp", "jelly", "Tussin/Tuss'", "Barre", "Wock", "Act", "Texas tea", "mud", "dirty Sprite", and "tsikuni". In areas where lean had not yet been introduced, codeine-based cough syrup mixed with antihistamine pills was called "juice and beans". Lean is also sometimes referred to by color in slang, usually purple (usually shortened to "purp"), but can also be red, green, or yellow based on the ingredients used.

== Preparation ==
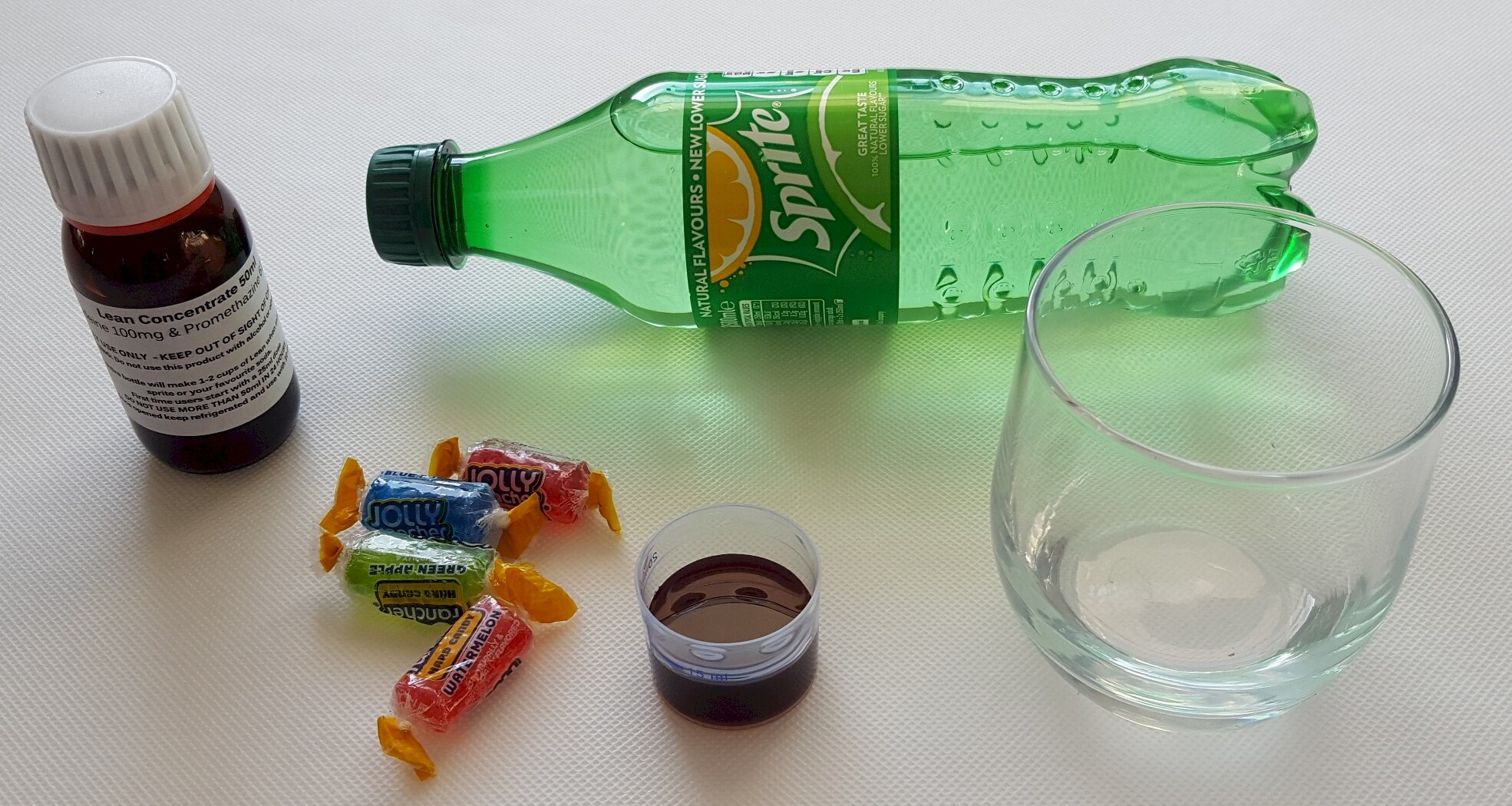
Ingredients for creating lean, including codeine-promethazine cough syrup, Jolly Rancher candies, and Sprite. Note the label on the bottled syrup, printed with instructions on how to prepare the lean. Some of the syrup has been decanted into a plastic container.

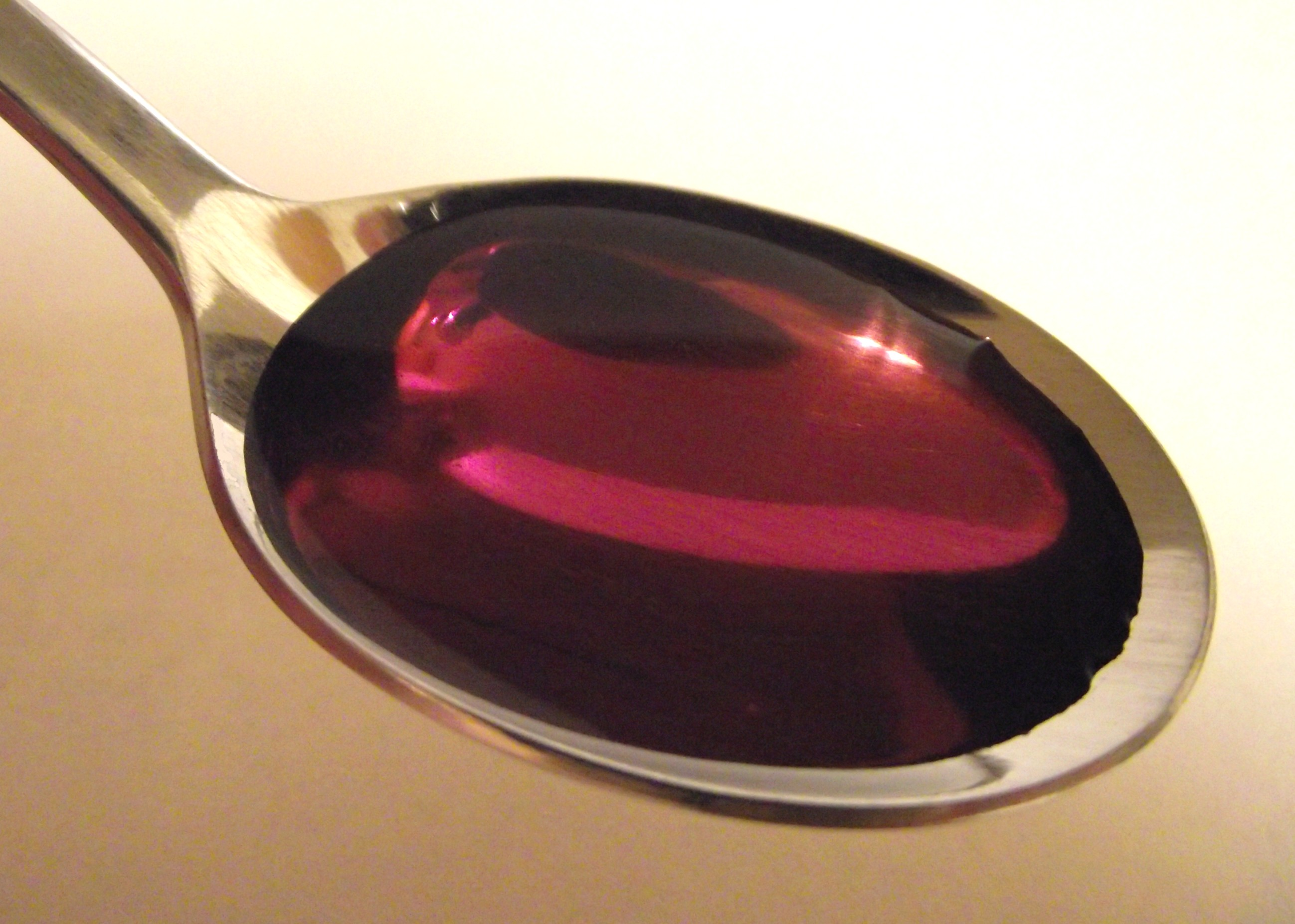
A spoonful of promethazine/codeine syrup showing the characteristic purple color

Typically, the base for lean is a strong prescription cold medicine, specifically cough syrup that contains both promethazine and codeine. Other preparations use guaifenesin/codeine, hydrocodone/chlorphenamine, hydrocodone/APAP, and hydrocodone/homatropine. Over-the-counter cold medicines that contain dextromethorphan (often paired with guaifenesin or acetaminophen) as the active ingredient have also been used, as they do not require acquiring a prescription.

To create a drinkable mixture, the cough syrup is combined with soft drinks, especially fruit-flavored drinks such as Sprite, Mountain Dew, or Fanta, and is often served in foam cups. A hard candy, usually a Jolly Rancher, may be added to give the mixture a sweeter flavor. Masking the undesired taste may impair judgment of the potency, which is a factor in overdosing.

== Effects ==
Lean produces mild-to-moderate "euphoric side effects" accompanied by "motor-skill impairment, lethargy, drowsiness, and a dissociative feeling from all other parts of the body." It has been suggested that the super-sweet combination of soda, cough syrup, and Jolly Ranchers provides a pleasing flavor and mouthfeel that lingers on the user's tongue for an extended duration. This phenomenon is often appealing to first-time users. Lean is often used in combination with alcohol, smoked cannabis or other recreational drugs.

=== Hazards ===
When taken in prescribed quantities, codeine-promethazine syrup is quite safe, but dangers arise in higher doses since it can cause one to stop breathing. Using alcohol and other drugs alongside lean increases the chance of serious adverse effects. The drink does not appear to cause seizures itself, but can increase their likelihood in those already susceptible to them. It has been suggested that the promethazine in the drink may heighten the euphoric effects of the codeine.

The addictive nature of the drink means that trying to discontinue regular usage can bring about symptoms of opioid withdrawal. In a 2008 interview with MTV News, Lil Wayne described the withdrawal as feeling "like death in your stomach when you stop. Everybody wants me to stop all this and all that. It ain't that easy."

== History ==
Lean is thought to have developed in Houston around the 1960s, when blues musicians would take Robitussin and cut it with beer. Later, when wine coolers came onto the market, they substituted for beer. These blues musicians lived in Houston's Fifth Ward, Third Ward, and South Park neighborhoods and the practice was taken up by the generation of rappers growing up in the same parts of the city. In the 1980s and 1990s the formula changed to using codeine promethazine cough syrup, somewhat like the glutethimide and codeine combination that was popular from the 1970s up to the early 1990s. Codeine-based cough syrups were also turned to as an alternative to pentazocine/tripelennamine ("T's and blues") after the pharmaceutical industry added naloxone to the tablets, effectively blocking their potential for abuse.

Lean remained a local phenomenon in Houston until the 1990s, when the American rapper DJ Screw released several tunes mentioning the drink in his mixtapes, which were extremely popular in the Houston area. DJ Screw's music was particularly appropriate for Houston's climate. Due to the heat and expanse of the Houston area residents spent long drives in their cars, "the music that most appropriately complements that has always been the music of DJ Screw, it's slowed down—and when I say slowed down I mean he would record sessions in his apartment with rappers freestyling over beats and he would make these big mixtapes and then he would actually slow them down even further on his cassette recorder." DJ Screw's invoking lean in his lyrics and his use of slow tempos had caused his style to be characterized "[a]s if the song itself has taken too much codeine promethazine". Rappers far beyond Houston would come to adopt aspects of DJ Screw's unique style, but not before he died of a codeine overdose in 2000.

=== Popularization ===
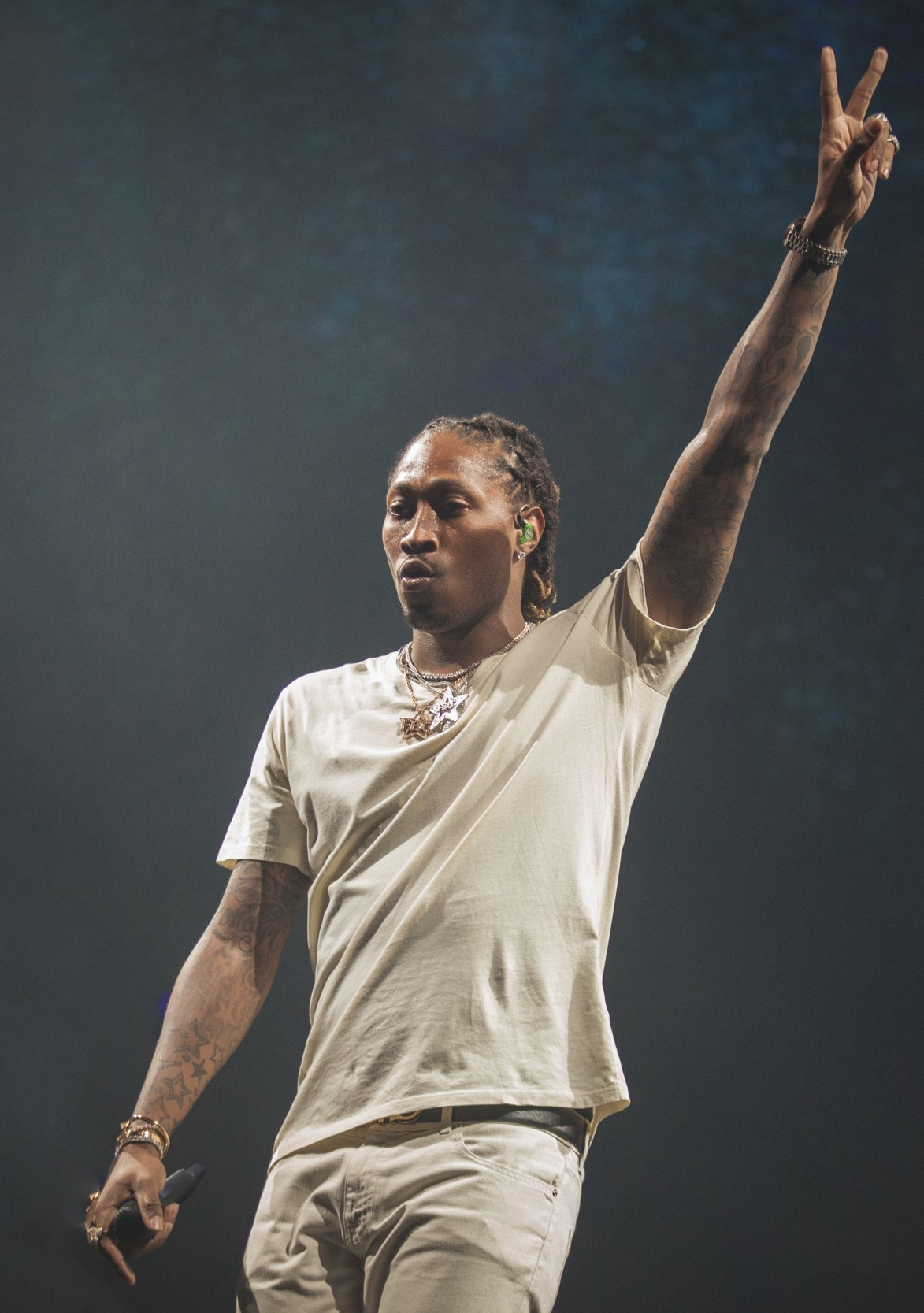
In 2019, rapper Future publicly spoke about quitting lean after learning about how his music influenced teenagers to try the drug.

Houston producer DJ Screw popularized the concoction, which is widely attributed as a source of inspiration for the chopped-and-screwed style of hip-hop music. The promethazine and codeine concoction first gained popularity in the underground hip-hop scene in Houston, where musician Big Hawk said it was consumed as early as the 1960s and 1970s, becoming more widely used in the early 1990s. Because of usage by rap artists in Houston, it became more popular in the 1990s. Its use later spread to other States in the South. In June 2000, Three 6 Mafia's single "Sippin' on Some Syrup", featuring UGK, brought the term purple drank to a nationwide audience.

In 2004, the University of Texas at Austin found that 8.3% of secondary school students in Texas had taken codeine syrup to get high. The Drug Enforcement Administration reports busts involving syrup across the Southern United States, particularly in Texas and Florida. As of 2011, the price of lean in Houston was twice the price it is in Los Angeles.

In a 2019 interview, American rapper Future spoke about quitting lean and stated that he was afraid that his fans would believe his music has changed if he had publicly admitted to quitting earlier. Future expressed disappointment after American rapper Juice Wrld told him that he was influenced by his music to try lean when he was young. Future stated "It's like, 'Oh shit.' How many other sixth-graders did I influence to drink lean?" The two artists had released a collaborative mixtape titled Wrld on Drugs in October 2018. Lil Nas X's hit song "Old Town Road" includes the line "Lean all in my bladder", though Lil Nas X has stated he does not endorse the drug.

Throughout the 2020s, the drug became further popularized throughout the rap and underground rap scene, and saw artists such as Ken Carson, Playboi Carti, OsamaSon, Bleood, Nettspend, and Che frequently mention the drug throughout their discographies and even dedicate songs to it. In a 2025 interview, OsamaSon spoke on taking "sober trips" and focusing on observing others rather than promoting it. Nettspend has also opened up on his habits involving the drug as well.

=== Notable incidents of use ===
DJ Screw, who popularized the codeine-based drink, died of a codeine–promethazine, Valium, and PCP overdose on November 16, 2000, several months after the video of Three 6 Mafia's single debuted.

Big Moe, a DJ Screw protégé whose albums City of Syrup and Purple World were based on the drink and who has been described as having "rapped obsessively about the drug", died at age 33 on October 14, 2007, after suffering a heart attack one week earlier that left him in a coma. There was speculation that lean may have contributed to his death.

Pimp C, a widely influential rapper from Port Arthur, Texas, and member of the rap duo UGK, was found dead on December 4, 2007, at the Mondrian Hotel in West Hollywood, California. The Los Angeles County Coroner's Office reported that the rapper's death was "due to promethazine-codeine effects and other unestablished factors." Ed Winter, assistant chief of the Coroner's Office, said the levels of the medication were elevated, but not enough to deem the death an overdose. However, Pimp C had a history of sleep apnea, a condition that causes one to stop breathing for short periods during sleep. A spokesman for the coroner's office said that the combination of sleep apnea and cough medication probably suppressed Pimp C's breathing long enough to bring on his death.

Fredo Santana, an American rapper who frequently made references to the drink in his music, died of a seizure on January 19, 2018. According to TMZ, he had been suffering from liver and kidney damage, which were believed to be the result of his addiction.

In September 2006, Terrence Kiel, a San Diego Chargers player, was arrested during practice for the possession with intent to sell prescription cough syrup for use in making the drink. Kiel was caught trying to ship a case of syrup to a friend via FedEx. Kiel was charged with two felony counts of transporting a controlled substance and three counts of possession for sale of a controlled substance.

On July 8, 2008, Johnny Jolly, a Green Bay Packers player, was pulled over in his car by the police for playing excessively loud music in a nightclub parking lot. The officers found a Dr Pepper bottle in a holder next to two Styrofoam cups containing soda and ice. The case was dismissed, but charges were refiled in December 2009 after the Houston Police Department acquired new equipment that allowed the police to test the evidence again. Jolly faced a possible maximum sentence of up to 20 years in jail, but as a first time offender he would be eligible for probation.

On July 5, 2010, former Oakland Raiders quarterback JaMarcus Russell was arrested at his home in Mobile, Alabama, for possession of codeine without a prescription. He was arrested as part of an undercover narcotics investigation. Russell was booked into city jail and released soon afterwards after making his bail.

On June 11, 2013, just days after being robbed at gunpoint in San Francisco, rapper 2 Chainz was arrested at Los Angeles International Airport on charges of possessing promethazine and codeine syrup (the primary ingredient of lean) along with marijuana.

Mac Miller, who died of a drug overdose not involving lean, spoke openly of his addiction to lean.

On April 7, 2015, Swedish rapper Yung Lean, while living in Miami Beach, Florida, and recording his second studio album Warlord, was hospitalized at Mount Sinai Medical Center due to an overdose stemming from an addiction to Xanax, cocaine, and lean.

On November 26, 2024, rapper Lil Shine was charged with attempting to acquire controlled substances, after he and two others were accused of hacking into the Drug Enforcement Administration’s physicians system to acquire large amount of promethazine and codeine (the main ingredients in lean) with the intent to sell them.

== Commercial products ==
Several legal commercial products loosely based on the concept of "purple drank" are marketed in the United States. In June 2008, Innovative Beverage Group, a Houston, Texas-based company, released a beverage called "Drank". The commercial product contains no codeine or promethazine, but claims to "Slow Your Roll" with a combination of herbal ingredients such as valerian root and rose hips as well as the hormone melatonin. Similar "anti-energy" or relaxation drinks on the commercial market use the names "Purple Stuff", "Sippin Syrup", and "Lean".

These commercial products have been criticized for their potential to serve as gateways to the dangerous illegal concoction. The marketing push has been described as akin to the making of candy cigarettes.

== See also ==
- Ayahuasca
- Benadryl challenge
- Coca wine
- "Flaming Moe's", an episode of The Simpsons where Homer invents a cocktail using cough syrup
- Recreational use of dextromethorphan
