= Dexing =

Dexing may refer to:

- Recreational use of dextromethorphan
- Dexing, Tibet, village in the Tibet Autonomous Region of China
- Dexing, Jiangxi, city in Jiangxi, China
