= City Under Siege (album) =

Studio album by E.S.G.
- Released: April 25, 2000
- Studio: Wreckshop Studios (Houston, TX)
- Genre: Southern rap
- Length: 1:17:00
- Label: Wreckshop Records
- Producer: D-Reck (exec.); Noke D; Blue; Double D; Lil' James; Sean "Solo" Jemison

E.S.G. chronology
Shinin' n' Grindin' (1999)	City Under Siege (2000)	All American Gangsta (2004)

Professional ratings
Review scores
Source	Rating
AllMusic	3/5 stars

City Under Siege is the fifth studio album by American rapper E.S.G., from Houston, Texas. It was released on April 25, 2000, via Wreckshop Records. The album peaked at #65 on the Top R&B/Hip-Hop Albums, #22 on the Independent Albums and #30 on the Heatseekers Albums in the US Billboard charts.

== Track listing ==
No.	Title	Producer(s)	Length
1.	"Intro"	Blue	1:58
2.	"Ride Out" (featuring Big Pokey & Tyte Eyes)	Noke D	3:34
3.	"Luv It How You Get It" (featuring Too $hort)	Sean "Solo" Jemison	4:18
4.	"Drop Yo Top" (featuring Big Moe)	Blue	4:56
5.	"Boss Hawggin'" (featuring D Gotti)	Lil' James	3:44
6.	"Grippin' Grain" (featuring Slim Thug & DeShawn Hill)	Blue	4:19
7.	"Money & Power" (featuring Ronnie Spencer, Lil' O & Will-Lean)	Noke D	5:05
8.	"First Brick"	Lil' James	4:14
9.	"City Under Siege" (featuring Nutty Black)	Blue	5:00
10.	"Good Life" (featuring Ronnie Spencer)	Lil' James	3:46
11.	"Billion Dollar Deal" (featuring Jainea)	Double D	3:44
12.	"Ballin Outta Control" (featuring Yung Redd, Kano & D Gotti)	Noke D	4:35
13.	"Keep on Grindin'" (featuring Ronnie Spencer)	Double D	4:24
14.	"Trickin' off Doe" (featuring Tyte Eyes, Mista Madd, J-Mac & Dirty $)	Blue	5:12
15.	"Superstar" (featuring Double D & Devin The Dude)	Blue	4:42
16.	"What's in Yo Cup?" (featuring Big Moe, Lil' Shay, D-Reck & Dirty $)	Noke D	4:34
17.	"Fix Yo Face" (featuring D-Reck)	Double D	3:49
18.	"Thugs in Heaven" (featuring D-Reck, D Gotti & Noke D)	Noke D	5:06
Total length:			1:12:36

== Personnel ==
- Cedric Dormaine Hill – main artist, vocals
- Darrell "D Gotti" Monroe – featured artist (tracks: 5, 12, 18)
- Ronnie Spencer – featured artist (tracks: 7, 10, 13)
- Derrick "D-Reck" Dixon – featured artist (tracks: 16–18), executive producer
- Tyson "Tyte Eyes" Duplechain – featured artist (tracks: 2, 14)
- Kenneth "Big Moe" Moore – featured artist (tracks: 4, 16)
- Dirty $ – featured artist (tracks: 14, 16)
- Milton "Big Pokey" Powell – featured artist (track 2)
- Todd Anthony Shaw – featured artist (track 3)
- DeShawn Hill – featured artist (track 6)
- Stayve Jerome Thomas – featured artist (track 6)
- William "Will-Lean" Gibbs – featured artist (track 7)
- Ore Magnus Lawson – featured artist (track 7)
- Nutty Black – featured artist (track 9)
- Jainea – featured artist (track 11)
- Kano – featured artist (track 12)
- Christopher Dejwan Gallien – featured artist (track 12)
- Ben "Mista Madd" Thompson – featured artist (track 14)
- J-Mac – featured artist (track 14)
- Devin C. Copeland – featured artist (track 15)
- André "Double D" Sargent – featured artist (track 15), producer (tracks: 11, 13, 17), co-producer, engineering
- Lil' Shay – featured artist (track 16)
- Derrick "Noke D" Haynes – featured artist (track 18), producer (tracks: 2, 7, 12, 16, 18), production coordinator, co-producer, engineering & mixing
- Blue – producer (tracks: 1, 4, 6, 9, 14–15)
- Lil' James – producer (tracks: 5, 8, 10)
- Sean "Solo" Jemison – producer (track 3)
- Skip Holman – engineering & mixing
- Deon – engineering
- Donavin "Kid Styles" Murray – art direction, design, photography

== Charts ==
Chart (2000)	Peak position
US Top R&B/Hip-Hop Albums (Billboard)	65
US Independent Albums (Billboard)	22
US Heatseekers Albums (Billboard)	30
