= Trill OG: The Epilogue =

Studio album by Bun B
- Released: November 11, 2013
- Recorded: 2008–2013
- Genre: Hip hop
- Length: 55:04
- Label: II Trill; Double Dose; J. Prince; Rap-A-Lot 4 Life; RED
- Producer: Big E; Big K.R.I.T.; The BlackOut Movement; Steve Below; DJ Khalil; Mr. Inkredible

Bun B chronology
Trill OG (2010)	Trill OG: The Epilogue (2013)	Return of the Trill (2018)

Singles from Trill OG: The Epilogue
- 1. "Fire" Released: September 17, 2013

Trill OG: The Epilogue is the fourth studio album by American rapper Bun B. The album was released on November 11, 2013, by II Trill Enterprises, Double Dose Entertainment, J. Prince Entertainment, Rap-A-Lot Records, and RED Music. The album features guest appearances from Big K.R.I.T., Lil' O, Pimp C, Rick Ross, 2 Chainz, Raekwon, Kobe, Royce da 5'9", Z-Ro, Big Hawk, Lil Boosie, E.S.G., Redman, Kirko Bangz, Devin the Dude, Max Frost, Trae tha Truth, C-Note, Serani and Gator Main.

== Background ==
On August 22, 2013, Rap-A-Lot Records revealed that the album would be released in October 2013. On October 4, 2013, it was announced that the album would be titled Trill OG: The Epilogue and would be released on November 11, 2013. On October 4, 2013, Bun B announced the album in a press release, saying: "It's a lot of good music that either didn't fit the format of the last album or that we decided to save for another project. I sat down with my long time business partner and Rap-A-Lot CEO James Prince to review the music that we had and quickly came up with an outstanding track list. The Epilogue is the perfect opportunity to release some great material to the fans and a proper final chapter for the trill-ogy. Good music is timeless."

In an October 2013, interview with Rolling Stone, Bun B spoke about the lead single "Fire", saying: "At the time, with ["Fire"], there was another element that I wanted to put on that record, and we never found that element. So because I never really felt I could release the song 100 percent at the time, I chose not to. Now, most people who would've had a Rick Ross [or 2 Chainz] verse would've found some way to put it out on their album, but when you've got good music, good music is timeless. So I wouldn't rush it." Shortly after in a press release Bun B revealed that additional guest appearances on the album would come from Kirko Bangz, Big K.R.I.T., Pimp C, Lil Boosie, Raekwon, Z-Ro and Devin the Dude.

== Promotion ==
On September 17, 2013, the album's first single "Fire" featuring Rick Ross, 2 Chainz and Serani was released. On October 29, 2013, the album's first promotional single "Eagles" was released, along with the pre order of the album. On November 12, 2013, the music video was released for "Triller" featuring Kirko Bangz. From March 6 to April 17, 2014, Bun B will go on The Trillest concert tour in promotion of the album. It will be co-headlined by "Triller" collaborator Kirko Bangz.

== Critical reception ==
Professional ratings
Review scores
Source	Rating
AllMusic	3.5/5 stars
RapReviews	(7.5/10)
XXL	3/5 (L)

Trill OG: The Epilogue was met with generally positive reviews from music critics. David Jeffries of AllMusic gave the album three and a half stars out of five, saying "Fly back in a time machine, back to the days before Pimp C passed and back when UGK were still a going concern, and the idea of Bun B having a successful, and even fruitful, solo career would be somewhere between odd and outlandish, even amongst the Houston hip-hop faithful. After all, the chemistry between the cold, hard Bun and the snaky, snide Pimp was just too good to ignore, but since the release of his first reluctant solo album -- 2005's Trill, recorded while the Pimp was locked-up on gun charges -- Bun has been banging out one solo surprise after another, this Epilogue being no different. The fourth, and according to Bun, final, Trill gets away with being a little more loose thanks to that "Epilogue" tag in its title, but once "The Best Is Back" kicks open the door with some bold, unfiltered putdowns ("My third leg long and your bitch is a lumberjack/You'd a killed that ho if you knew what I done to that"), the overall messiness of the album doesn't hurt nearly as much as the word "final." David Inkeles of XXL gave the album an L, saying "The fact that so many of the album's tracks are feature-heavy helps distinguish some of the otherwise-similar sounding songs, and adds to the overall playability of the project. While a lot has changed since his UGK days, and even from his first Trill album, The Epilogue does make a couple things clear: Bun B can still rap very, very well, and cares about proving it, too. While this won't be his most successful album and probably his least memorable, it's a welcome reminder that as a genre, hip-hop is infinitely better off with Bun B still involved."

== Commercial performance ==
The album debuted at number 30 on the Billboard 200 chart, with first-week sales of 11,000 copies in the United States. In its second week the album sold 3,700 more copies bringing its total album sales to 14,400.

== Track listing ==
No.	Title	Producer(s)	Length
1.	"The Best Is Back"	Steve Below	3:33
2.	"Cake" (featuring Big K.R.I.T., Lil Boosie, and Pimp C)	Big K.R.I.T.	3:58
3.	"Fire" (featuring Rick Ross, 2 Chainz, and Serani)	The BlackOut Movement	3:48
4.	"No Competition" (featuring Raekwon and Kobe)	DJ Khalil	3:54
5.	"Don't Play With Me" (featuring Pimp C)	Big E	3:56
6.	"Gladiator" (featuring Truck Buck)	Steve Below; Marq Moody	5:00
7.	"Eagles"	Steve Below	4:12
8.	"Stop Playin'" (featuring Royce da 5'9" and Redman)	Mr. Inkredible	3:44
9.	"Triller" (featuring Kirko Bangz)	Big E	3:34
10.	"Off Top" (featuring Max Frost)	Steve Below	3:08
11.	"Dippin' & Swervin'"	Steve Below	3:46
12.	"On One" (featuring Gator Main and Devin the Dude)	Big E	4:03
13.	"The Legendary DJ Screw" (featuring E.S.G., C-Note, Lil' O, Trae tha Truth, Z-Ro, and Big Hawk)	Big E	3:50
14.	"Bye!"	Steve Below	4:30

== Charts ==
Chart (2013)	Peak position
US Billboard 200	30
US Top R&B/Hip-Hop Albums (Billboard)	6
US Independent Albums (Billboard)	2
