= Moe Life =

Studio album by Big Moe
- Released: May 27, 2003
- Studio: Wreckshop Studios (Houston, TX); Holman Sound Design (Houston, TX)
- Genre: Southern hip hop
- Length: 1:00:19
- Label: Wreckshop Records
- Producer: D-Reck (exec.); Noke D; Salih Williams; Blue; Calvin

Big Moe chronology
Purple World (2002)	Moe Life (2003)	Unfinished Business (2008)

Singles from Moe Life
- 1. "Hell Yeah / Just A Dog" Released: 2003

Professional ratings
Review scores
Source	Rating
AllMusic	3/5 stars
RapReviews	8/10 stars

Moe Life is the third studio album by American rapper Big Moe from Houston, Texas. It was released on May 27, 2003 via Wreckshop Records. The album peaked at number 33 on the Top R&B/Hip-Hop Albums and number 29 on the Independent Albums in the US Billboard charts.

== Track listing ==
No.	Title	Producer(s)	Length
1.	"Noke N Moe (Live)" (Chop)	Noke D	3:09
2.	"Hell Yeah!" (featuring D-Reck & Tyte Eyes)	Noke D	3:45
3.	"Throwedsville" (featuring A-3 & Dirty $)	Salih Williams	4:54
4.	"Just a Dog" (Club)	Noke D	4:13
5.	"Shorty" (featuring A-3, Noke D, Mafia Mike & Tyte Eyes)	Noke D	4:24
6.	"Yessir" (featuring T2)	Noke D	3:46
7.	"Big Dudes" (featuring D Gotti, Noke D & Toon)	Noke D	3:05
8.	"My Girl" (featuring D Gotti & Dirty $)	Blue; Salih Williams	3:13
9.	"Every Body" (featuring D Gotti)	Salih Williams	3:26
10.	"Move Around" (featuring Mr. 3-2 & Noke D)	Noke D	4:00
11.	"Moe Life" (featuring Noke D & Toya)	Salih Williams	2:42
12.	"Leave Drank Alone" (featuring Michael Wilson)	Noke D	3:44
13.	"Skit Interview"		0:36
14.	"Ride With Us" (featuring D Gotti, D-Reck, Toya, Tyte Eyes & Dirty $)	Calvin	4:23
15.	"Roll Candy Rod" (featuring Killa Milla & Noke D)	Noke D	3:04
16.	"Get Lonely Too" (featuring Noke D & Michael Wilson)	Noke D	4:05
17.	"My Life 2"	Noke D	3:50
Total length:			1:00:19

Sample credits

- Track 4 contains elements from "Big Pimpin'" by Tha Dogg Pound
- Track 12 contains elements from "Never Leave Me Alone" by Nate Dogg & Snoop Dogg
- Track 16 contains elements from "Gigolos Get Lonely Too" by The Time

== Charts ==
Chart (2003)	Peak position
US Top R&B/Hip-Hop Albums (Billboard)	33
US Independent Albums (Billboard)	29
