= City of Syrup =

Studio album by Big Moe
- Released: July 18, 2000
- Recorded: 1999–2000
- Studio: Wreckshop Studios (Houston, TX)
- Genre: Southern hip hop
- Length: 1:13:35
- Label: Wreckshop Records
- Producer: D-Reck (exec.); Noke D; Blue; Salih Williams; Double D

Big Moe chronology
City of Syrup (2000)	Purple World (2002)

Singles from City of Syrup
- 1. "City of Syrup/Maan!/Payin' Dues" Released: 1999; 2. "Barre Baby/Choppaz" Released: 1999

Professional ratings
Review scores
Source	Rating
AllMusic	3/5 stars

City of Syrup is the debut studio album by American rapper and Screwed Up Click member Big Moe. A "Wreckchopped and Screwed" version was also released. The album included two 1999 singles; among the tracks released with the singles was "Maan!", which was written as a response to the track "Whoa!", by Black Rob.

== Track listing ==
No.	Title	Producer(s)	Length
1.	"Momma M.O.E" (Skit)		1:57
2.	"Barre Baby" (featuring Ronnetta Spencer)	Salih Williams	2:59
3.	"Get Back" (featuring Lil' O and Big Hawk)	Double D	3:48
4.	"Maan!" (featuring E.S.G. and Big Pokey)	Noke D	4:04
5.	"We da' Shit!" (featuring E.S.G. and Z-Ro)	Blue	3:33
6.	"I'll Do It" (featuring Lil' O and Dirty $)	Blue	4:13
7.	"Drank" (Skit)		3:33
8.	"City of Syrup" (featuring Z-Ro, Tyte Eyes and DJ Screw)	Blue	4:21
9.	"Choppaz" (featuring D Gotti, Noke D and D-Reck)	Salih Williams	5:33
10.	"I Wonder" (featuring Enjoli and Tyte Eyes)	Blue	4:45
11.	"Payin' Dues" (featuring Z-Ro)	Blue	3:35
12.	"X (Time) 4 Change" (featuring Al-D, Will-Lean and Ronnie Spencer)	Noke D	4:53
13.	"Po' It Up" (featuring Big Hawk and Z-Ro)	Blue; Noke D	4:11
14.	"Ra-Ra" (Skit)		0:26
15.	"Ridin' Candy" (featuring Noke D, C-Nile and D Gotti)	Noke D	4:45
16.	"Whatcha Want?" (featuring D-Reck, D Gotti and Tyte Eyes)	Noke D	3:56
17.	"Freestyle" (Skit)		0:06
18.	"Freestyle (June 27)"	Double D	5:26
19.	"Leanin'" (featuring Mike D, Michael Wilson and DJ Screw)	Noke D	7:20
Total length:			1:13:35

== Sample credits ==
City of Syrup

- "Doo Wa Ditty (Blow That Thing)" by Zapp

Choppaz

- "Pop Life" by Prince

I Wonder

- "I Wonder If I Take You Home" by Lisa Lisa & Cult Jam and Full Force

Leanin

- "Feenin'" by Jodeci

Po' It Up

- "Get It Up" by The Time

== Charts ==
Chart (2000)	Peak position
US Billboard 200	176
US Top R&B/Hip-Hop Albums (Billboard)	52
US Independent Albums (Billboard)	8
US Heatseekers Albums (Billboard)	9
