= Blockbleeders =

Compilation album by Screwed Up Click
- Released: May 18, 1999
- Recorded: 1999
- Studio: Top Notch Studios (Houston, TX); Uptown Recording Studio (Houston, TX)
- Genre: Southern hip hop
- Length: 59:58
- Label: Straight Profit Records
- Producer: Double J (exec.); Cornell Andre (also exec.); Denden (also exec.); Solo D; Sean Blaze

Screwed Up Click chronology
Blockbleeders (1999)	Making History (2005)

Professional ratings
Review scores
Source	Rating
AllMusic	3/5 stars

Blockbleeders is a compilation album by the American underground rap group Screwed Up Click. It was released on May 18, 1999 via Straight Profit Records. Recording sessions took place at Top Notch Studios and Uptown Recording Studio in Houston, Texas.

== Track listing ==
1. "Commercial Intro" – performed by Denden & Solo D
2. "Pimping Pens & Blessing Pads" – performed by Yungstar, C-Nile, E-Clarke, Solo D & DatBoy Grace
3. "Southwest Soldier" – performed by Solo D & Datboy Grace
4. "Gots To Be Everything" – performed by 2-Low, Lil' James, Denden & Yungstar
5. "Key Kars & Killers" – performed by C-Nile & Sean Blaze
6. "Sex Money & Drugs" – performed by Solo D, Mr. 3-2 & DatBoy Grace
7. "La Dochavilla" – performed by C-Nile & Denden
8. "Let's Get It Together" – performed by Solo D, T-Pop, Yungstar & DatBoy Grace
9. "Golden Child" – performed by C-Nile
10. "No Exit" – performed by E-Clarke & Crooks
11. "I'm So Throwed" – performed by Dat Boy Grace, Denden, Lil' James, Solo D & E-Clarke
12. "Finer Things In Life" – performed by C-Nile
13. "State To State" – performed by Solo D, C-Nile, Crooks, Denden, Shorty D, DatBoy Grace, Woody Wood, L.O.S., E-Clarke & Black One
14. "Commercial Outro" – performed by Denden
