= The Chronicles =

Compilation album by E.S.G.
- Released: January 29, 2008
- Genre: Southern hip hop
- Length: 1:07:47
- Label: Scarred 4 Life Entertainment

E.S.G. chronology
The Chronicles (2008)	Greatest Independent Hits (2009)

The Chronicles is the first compilation album by American rapper E.S.G. from Houston, Texas. It was released on January 29, 2008 through Scarred 4 Life Entertainment with distribution via Select-O-Hits.

== Track listing ==
1. "Intro"
2. "Crooked Streets"
3. "Swangin' & Bangin'"
4. "Flipping" (featuring Lil' Wil)
5. "Ocean of Funk"
6. "Birdies Don't Chirp"
7. "I'm The Boss"
8. "Down Here" (featuring Lil' Keke & Scarface)
9. "Skit"
10. "Watch Out" (featuring Big Hawk)
11. "Dirty Hustle"
12. "Ride Wit Us"
13. "Comin' Down" (featuring Fat Pat)
14. "Southside Pop Trunk" (featuring Big T & Brandy)
15. "Ride Wit Us (Remix)" (featuring Bun B & Chamillionaire)
16. "Actin' Bad"
17. "Southside Baby"
