= Shinin' n' Grindin' =

Shinin' N' Grindin'

Studio album by E.S.G.
- Released: March 9, 1999
- Studio: Wreckshop Studios (Houston, TX)
- Genre: Southern rap
- Length: 1:12:36
- Label: Wreckshop Records
- Producer: D-Reck (exec.); Double D; Noke D; Chicken Hawk; Sin

E.S.G. chronology
Return Of The Living Dead (1998)	Shinin' N' Grindin' (1999)	City Under Siege (2000)

Singles from Shinin' N' Grindin'
- 1. "Braids N' Faids" Released: 1999; 2. "Shinin' N' Grindin'" Released: 1999

Professional ratings
Review scores
Source	Rating
AllMusic	3/5 stars

Shinin' N' Grindin' is the fourth studio album by American rapper E.S.G. from Houston, Texas. It was released on March 9, 1999 via Wreckshop Records. The album peaked at #71 on the Top R&B/Hip-Hop Albums in the US Billboard charts and has sold over 100,000 copies.

== Track listing ==
No.	Title	Producer(s)	Length
1.	"Intro" (Skit)		0:14
2.	"Realist Rhymin'" (featuring Lil' Flip)	Double D	4:59
3.	"Do You Wanna Ride" (featuring Sean Pymp, Tyte Eyes & Billy Cook)	Double D	5:22
4.	"Stay Player" (featuring D-Reck, Billy Cook, Ronnie Spencer, Double D & Neitra)	Double D	5:52
5.	"Who's Next 2 Plex"	Double D	4:36
6.	"Ball Till We Die" (featuring Noke D)	Double D	5:06
7.	"Gangsta Bitch" (featuring Ronnie Spencer & Mr. 3-2)	Sin	5:01
8.	"Shinin and Grindin'"	Noke D	5:32
9.	"Courtroom" (Skit)		0:51
10.	"Responsibility"	Chicken Hawk	4:21
11.	"Close Call" (Skit)		0:21
12.	"Where da Hoes At"	Chicken Hawk	4:42
13.	"Boys n da South" (featuring Big Hawk)	Chicken Hawk	3:42
14.	"Jumpin on It"	Noke D	4:24
15.	"Braids n' Fades" (featuring Slim Thug)	Double D	4:18
16.	"Hold On"	Sin	4:33
17.	"Slow My Roll"	Noke D	4:38
18.	"Ain't 2 Be Fucked With" (featuring Dirty $, Sean Pymp & Tyte Eyes)	Double D	4:04
Total length:			1:12:36

== Personnel ==
- Cedric Dormaine Hill – main artist, vocals (tracks: 2–8, 10, 12–18)
- Derrick Blaylock – vocals (tracks: 3–4)
- Tyson Duplechain – vocals (tracks: 3, 18)
- Sean Pymp – vocals (tracks: 3, 18)
- Ronnie Spencer – vocals (tracks: 4, 7)
- Wesley Eric Weston Jr. – vocals (track 2)
- Derrick Dixon – vocals (track 4), executive producer
- André Sargent – vocals (track 4), producer (tracks: 2–6, 15, 18)
- Neitra – vocals (track 4)
- Derrick Haynes – vocals (track 6), producer (tracks: 8, 14, 17), project coordinator, mixing
- Christopher Juel Barriere – vocals (track 7)
- John Edward Hawkins – vocals (track 13)
- Stayve Jerome Thomas – vocals (track 15)
- Dirty $ – vocals (track 18)
- Barry Risper – producer (tracks: 10, 12–13)
- Sinclair Ridley – producer (tracks: 7, 16)
- Skip Holman – mixing & mastering
- Sean George – engineering
- Clyde Bazile, Jr. – art direction
- Deron Neblett – photography

== Charts ==
Chart (1999)	Peak position
US Top R&B/Hip-Hop Albums (Billboard)	71
US Heatseekers Albums (Billboard)	48
