= Recreational use of dextromethorphan =

Cough suppressant drug susceptible to misuse

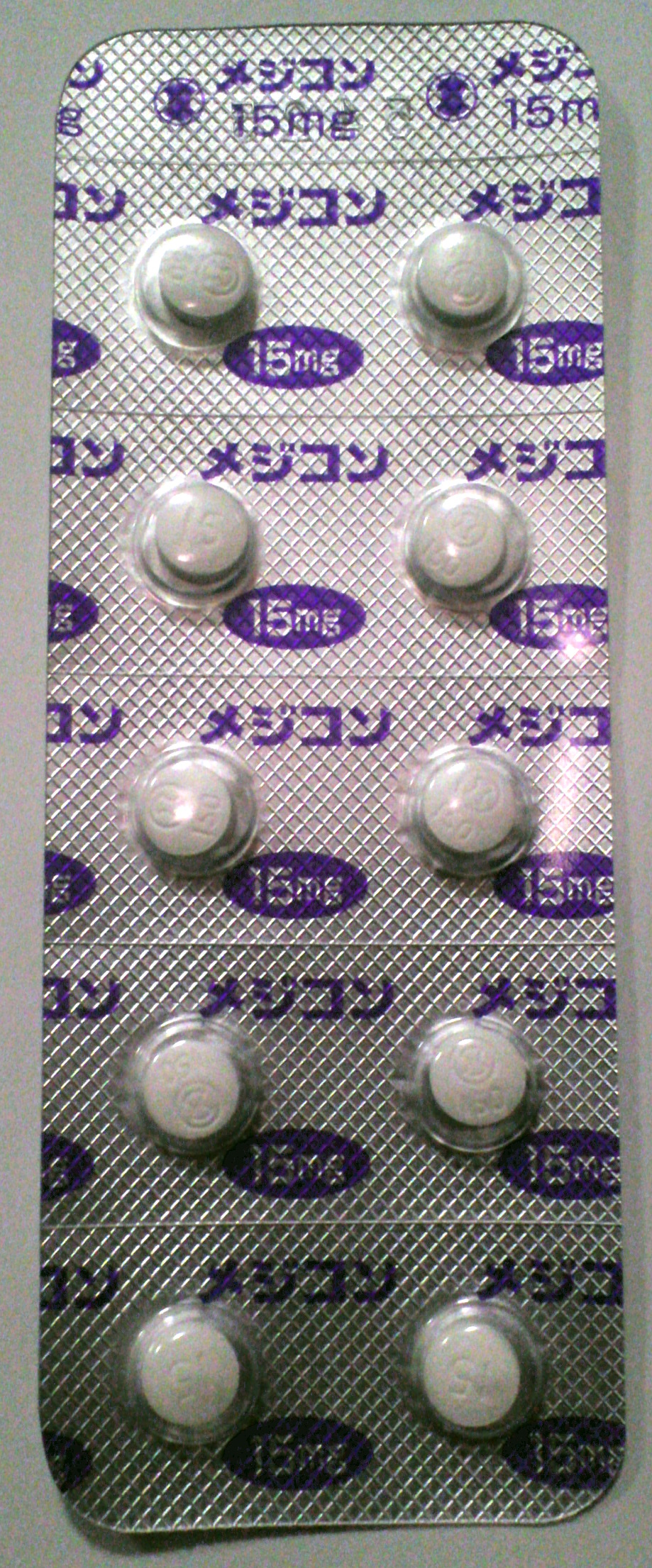
Cough medicine containing dextromethorphan in tablet form (15mg)

Dextromethorphan, or DXM, a common active ingredient found in many over-the-counter cough suppressant cold medicines, is used as a recreational drug and entheogen for its dissociative effects. Street names include Brownies, Dextro, Drix, Gel, Dex, Del, Mega-perls, Poor man's ecstasy, Poor man's PCP, Red devils, Robo, Rojo, Rome, Skittles, Super Skittles, Triple Cs, reds, Sky and Velvet.

It has almost no psychoactive effects at medically recommended doses. However, dextromethorphan has powerful dissociative and euphoric properties when administered in doses well above those considered therapeutic for cough suppression. Recreational use of DXM is sometimes referred to in slang form as "robo-tripping", “tussing” or "skittling", whose prefix derives from the Robitussin brand name, the brand name Tussin, or "Triple Cs", which derives from the Coricidin brand whose tablets are printed with "CC+C" for "Chest Congestion and Cough". However, this brand presents additional danger when used at recreational doses due to the presence of chlorpheniramine (antihistamine).

In over-the-counter formulations, DXM is often combined with acetaminophen (paracetamol, APAP) to relieve pain; however, to achieve DXM's dissociative effects, the maximum daily therapeutic dose of 4000 mg of APAP is often exceeded, potentially causing acute or chronic liver failure, making abuse and subsequent tolerance of products which contain both DXM and APAP potentially fatal.

An online essay first published in 1995 entitled "The DXM FAQ" described dextromethorphan's potential for recreational use, and classified its effects into so-called plateaus. Each plateau is categorized depending on how many milligrams of DXM are ingested, each featuring varying or more intense effects. The defined number of plateaus differs depending on the source, but the generally agreed-upon number is 4 or 5.

Owing to its recreational use, many retailers in the US have moved dextromethorphan-containing products behind the counter so that one must ask a pharmacist to receive them or be 18 years (19 in New York and Alabama, 21 in Mississippi) or older to purchase them. Some retailers also give out printed recommendations about the potential for abuse with the purchase of products containing dextromethorphan.

== Classification ==
At high doses, dextromethorphan is classified as a dissociative general anesthetic and hallucinogen, similar to the controlled substances ketamine and phencyclidine (PCP). Also like those drugs, dextromethorphan is an NMDA receptor antagonist. It generally does not produce withdrawal symptoms characteristic of physical dependence-inducing substances, but cases of both psychological dependence and physical dependence have been reported in the past, although physical dependence is usually only seen in cases of heavy abuse. Due to dextromethorphan's selective serotonin reuptake inhibitor-like action, the sudden cessation of recreational dosing in tolerant individuals can result in mental and physical withdrawal symptoms similar to the withdrawal from SSRIs. These withdrawal effects can manifest as psychological effects, including depression, irritability, cravings, and as physical effects, including lethargy, body aches, and a sensation of unpleasant tingling, not unlike a mild "electric shock".

== Effects ==
Dextromethorphan's effects have been divided into four plateaus.

1. The first plateau (1.5 to 2.5 mg per kg body weight) is described as having euphoria, auditory changes, mild stimulation, and change in perception of gravity.
2. The second plateau (2.5 to 7.5 mg/kg) causes intense euphoria, vivid imagination, and closed-eye hallucinations.
3. The third and fourth plateaus (7.5 mg/kg and over) cause profound alterations in consciousness, and users often report out-of-body experiences or temporary psychosis. This results in a sort of flanging (speeding up and/or slowing down) of sensory input, which is another characteristic effect of recreational use.

Also, a marked difference is seen between dextromethorphan hydrobromide, contained in most cough suppressant preparations, and dextromethorphan polistirex, contained in the brand name preparation Delsym. Polistirex is a polymer that is bonded to the dextromethorphan that requires more time for the stomach to digest it, as it requires that an ion exchange reaction take place prior to its dissolution into the blood. Because of this, dextromethorphan polistirex takes considerably longer to absorb, resulting in more gradual and longer lasting effects reminiscent of time-release pills. As a cough suppressant, the polistirex version lasts up to 12 hours. This duration also holds true when used recreationally.

A 1981 estimate by Gosselin suggested that the median lethal dose of dextromethorphan in humans may range between 50 and 500 mg/kg. More specific experimental data indicate that the oral LD50 of dextromethorphan hydrobromide monohydrate in rats is approximately 116 mg/kg, according to the Safety Data Sheet (SDS) provided by Sigma-Aldrich. The observed symptoms at this dosage include convulsions. Doses as high as 15–20 mg/kg are taken by some recreational users. A single case study suggests that the antidote to dextromethorphan overdose is naloxone, administered intravenously.

In addition to producing PCP-like mental effects, high doses may cause a false-positive result for PCP and opiates in some drug tests.

== Risks associated with use ==
Dextromethorphan has not been shown to cause vacuolization in animals, also known as Olney's lesions, despite early speculation that it might, due to similarities with ketamine. In rats, oral administration of dextromethorphan did not cause vacuolization in laboratory tests. Oral administration of dextromethorphan repeatedly during adolescence, however, has been shown to impair learning in those rats during adulthood. The occurrence of Olney's lesions in humans, however, has not been proven or disproven.

William E. White, author of the "DXM FAQ", has compiled informal research from correspondence with dextromethorphan users suggesting that heavy abuse may result in various deficits corresponding to the brain areas affected by Olney's lesions; these include loss of episodic memory, decline in ability to learn, abnormalities in some aspects of visual processing, and deficits of abstract language comprehension. In 2004, however, White retracted the article in which he made these claims.

A formal survey of dextromethorphan users showed that more than half of users reported experience of these withdrawal symptoms individually for the first week after long-term/addictive dextromethorphan use: fatigue, apathy, flashbacks, and constipation. Over a quarter reported insomnia, nightmares, anhedonia, impaired memory, attention deficit, and decreased libido. Rarer side effects included panic attacks, impaired learning, tremor, jaundice, urticaria (hives), and myalgia. Medical DXM use has not been shown to cause the above issues.

=== Other ingredients ===
Misuse of multisymptom cold medications, rather than use of a cough suppressant whose sole active ingredient is dextromethorphan, carries significant risk of fatality or serious illness. Multisymptom cold medicines contain other active ingredients, such as paracetamol (acetaminophen), which can cause permanent bodily damage such as kidney failure or death if taken in quantities exceeding the recommended dose. Chlorphenamine and phenylephrine may also contribute to the harm. Sorbitol, an artificial sweetener found in many cough syrups containing dextromethorphan, can also have negative side effects, including diarrhea and nausea when taken at recreational dosages of dextromethorphan. Guaifenesin, an expectorant commonly accompanying dextromethorphan in cough preparations, can cause unpleasant symptoms including vomiting, nausea, kidney stones, and headache.

=== Interactions ===
Combining dextromethorphan with other substances can compound risks. Central nervous system (CNS) stimulants such as amphetamine and/or cocaine can cause a dangerous rise in blood pressure and heart rate. CNS depressants such as alcohol will have a combined depressant effect, which can cause a decreased respiratory rate. Combining dextromethorphan with other CYP2D6 substrates can cause both drugs to build to dangerous levels in the bloodstream. Combining dextromethorphan with other serotonergic drugs could possibly cause serotonin syndrome, an excess of serotonergic activity in the CNS and peripheral nervous system.

== Pharmacology ==
Dextromethorphan is primarily a sigma receptor agonist and an SNRI, and dextromethorphan's effects as a dissociative hallucinogen may be attributed partially to dextrorphan (DXO), a metabolite produced when dextromethorphan is metabolized by the body. Both dextrorphan and dextromethorphan are NMDA receptor antagonists, like other dissociative hallucinogens such as ketamine and PCP. Although dextrorphan is more potent than its "parent molecule" dextromethorphan, it likely works in combination with dextromethorphan to produce hallucinogenic effects due to only a small percentage of dextromethorphan being metabolized into dextrorphan.

As NMDA receptor antagonists, dextrorphan and dextromethorphan inhibit the excitatory amino acid and neurotransmitter glutamate in the brain. This can effectively slow, or even shut down certain neural pathways, preventing areas of the brain from communicating with each other. This leaves the user feeling dissociated or disconnected, experienced as brain fog or derealization.

== Legality ==
Antitussive preparations containing dextromethorphan are legal to purchase from pharmacies in most countries, with some exceptions being UAE, France, and Sweden. In Russia, dextromethorphan (commonly sold under the brand names Tussin+ and Glycodin) is a Schedule III controlled substance and is placed in the same list as benzodiazepines and the majority of barbiturates.

=== China ===
In December 2021, the National Medical Products Administration reclassified all oral single-component dextromethorphan to prescription drugs due to potential abuse. The authorities also mandated manufacturers to remove statements like "no addiction or tolerance with long-term use" from their instructions. Despite the online sales ban, the drug can still be found on some niche e-commerce platforms in China and Twitter.

In April 2024, the National Medical Products Administration announced that dextromethorphan, compound diphenoxylate tablets, nalfurafine, and lorcaserin are included in the second-class psychotropic drug catalog. The announcement took effect in July. In August, Xi'an police arrested a suspect and seized 23 boxes of dextromethorphan; in October, the Hepu County People's Court sentenced one defendant to 7 months in prison, while the Yanchi County People's Court sentenced a pharmacy owner to 6 months, both for drug trafficking involving dextromethorphan.

=== Indonesia ===
After previously being available over the counter, the National Agency of Drug and Food Control of Republic of Indonesia (BPOM-RI) now prohibits single-component dextromethorphan drug sales with or without prescription. Indonesia is the only country in the world that makes single-component dextromethorphan illegal even by prescription and violators may be prosecuted by law. Indonesian National Narcotic Bureau has even threatened to revoke pharmacies' and drug stores' licenses if they still stock dextromethorphan, and will notify the police for criminal prosecution. As a result of this regulation, 130 drugs have been withdrawn from the market, but drugs containing multicomponent dextromethorphan can be sold over the counter. In its official press release, the bureau also stated that dextromethorphan is often used as a substitute for marijuana, amphetamine, and heroin by drug abusers, and its use as an antitussive is less beneficial nowadays.

The Director of Narcotics, Psychotropics, and Addictive Substances Control (NAPZA) BPOM-RI, Dr. Danardi Sosrosumihardjo, SpKJ, explains that dextromethorphan, morphine, and heroin are derived from the same tree, and states the effect of dextromethorphan to be equivalent to 1/100 of morphine and injected heroin. By contrast, the Deputy of Therapeutic Product and NAPZA Supervision BPOM-RI, Dra. Antonia Retno Tyas Utami, Apt. MEpid., states that dextromethorphan, being chemically similar to morphine, has a much more dangerous and direct effect to the central nervous system, thus causing mental breakdown in the user. She also claimed, without citing any prior scientific study or review, that unlike morphine users, dextromethorphan users cannot be rehabilitated. This claim is contradicted by numerous scientific studies which show that naloxone alone offers effective treatment and promising therapy results in treating dextromethorphan addiction and poisoning. Dra. Antonia Retno Tyas Utami also claimed high rates of dextromethorphan abuse - including fatalities - in Indonesia, and even more questionable, suggested that codeine, despite being a more physically addictive μ-opioid class antitussive, be made available as an alternative to dextromethorphan.

=== United States ===
No legal distinction currently exists in the United States between medical and recreational use, sale, or purchase. Some states and store chains have implemented restrictions, such as requiring signatures for DXM sale, limiting quantities allowable for purchase, and requiring that purchasers be over the age of majority in their state. The sale of dextromethorphan in its pure powder form may incur penalties, although no explicit law exists prohibiting its sale or possession, other than in Illinois. Cases of individuals being sentenced to time in prison and other penalties for selling pure dextromethorphan in this form have been reported, because of the incidental violation of more general laws for the sale of legitimate drugs – such as resale of a medication without proper warning labels.

Dextromethorphan was excluded from the Controlled Substances Act (CSA) of 1970 and was specifically excluded from the Single Convention on Narcotic Drugs. As of 2010, it was still excluded from U.S. Schedules of Controlled Substances; however, officials have warned that it could still be added if increased abuse warrants its scheduling. The motivation behind its exclusion from the CSA was that under the CSA, all optical isomers of listed Schedule II opiates are automatically Schedule II substances. Since dextromethorphan is an optical isomer of the Schedule II opiate levomethorphan (but does not act like an opiate), an exemption was necessary to keep it an uncontrolled substance. The Federal Analog Act does not apply to dextromethorphan because a new drug application has been filed for it.

== See also ==
- Dissociative drug
  - Nitrous oxide
  - Ketamine
    - K-hole
  - Phencyclidine
- NMDA receptor antagonist
- Psychedelic drug
- Purple drank
- Benadryl challenge
- Sigma agonist
