= Cloverland, Houston =

Neighborhood in Houston, Texas

Coordinates: 29.634°N 95.368°W

Cloverland is a neighborhood located on the south side of Houston, Texas, United States.

Cloverland was the home neighborhood for Lil Flip and many other Houston rappers. In 2005, Cloverburger, a hamburger joint in the neighborhood located at 4515 Mowery Road, was the site of the T.I./Lil Flip altercation.

== Education ==
=== Primary and secondary schools ===
==== Public schools ====
Cloverland is served by the Houston ISD.

Cloverland is zoned to:

- Law Elementary School for grades Kindergarten through 5
- Woodson K-8 School for grades 6 through 8
- Worthing High School for grades 9 through 12

Carnegie Vanguard High School an HISD 9-12 magnet, was located near Cloverland before it moved to the Fourth Ward.

KIPP: the Knowledge Is Power Program operates the KIPP Spirit College Preparatory School, a 5th Grade charter school, near Cloverland.

== Postal services ==
The closest United States Postal Service post office is the Martin Luther King Post Office at 9444 Cullen Boulevard, 77051-9998.

== Emergency services ==
=== Police services ===
The neighborhood is within the Houston Police Department's Southeast Patrol Division .

The Sunnyside Storefront Station, near Cloverland, is located at 3511 Reed Road .

=== Fire services ===
The Houston Fire Department Station 55 Sunnyside is near Cloverland at 11212 Cullen Boulevard at Selinski .
