= Throwed in da Game =

Studio album by Fat Pat and the Wreckshop Family
- Released: April 7, 1998
- Recorded: 1997–1998
- Genre: Hip-hop
- Length: 1:06:50
- Label: Wreckshop
- Producer: Chicken Hawk; Danny Jackson; Double D; Noke D.; Prowla; Sean "Solo" Jemison

Fat Pat chronology
Ghetto Dreams (1998)	Throwed in da Game (1998)	Fat Pats Greatest Hits (2001)

Professional ratings
Review scores
Source	Rating
RapReviews	7.5/10

Throwed in da Game is a collaborative studio album by American rapper Fat Pat and hip-hop collective the Wreckshop Family. It was released in 1998 via Wreckshop Records, marking Fat Pat's second posthumous release. Production was handled by Double D, Noke D, Chicken Hawk, Danny Jackson, Prowla and Sean 'Solo' Jamison. It features guest appearances from E.S.G., Mr. 3-2, H.A.W.K. and South Park Mexican. The album peaked at number 40 on Billboard's Top R&B Albums chart.

== Track listing ==
No.	Title	Producer(s)	Length
1.	"Throwed in da Game" (performed by Double D, Chicken Hawk and Noke D)	Double D	3:34
2.	"Fat Pat (Interview)"		0:37
3.	"Jammin Screw" (performed by Fat Pat)	Sean "Solo" Jemison	3:44
4.	"Head & Shouldaz" (performed by Sean Pymp, D-Gotti, Noke D and Chicken Hawk)	Noke D; Chicken Hawk (co.)	3:54
5.	"Dirty South" (performed by Dren, Double D, ESG, Granpappy Mafioso and Nitra)	Double D	4:29
6.	"I'm a Slicka" (performed by Sity Slickas)	Chicken Hawk	3:39
7.	"If You Only Knew" (performed by Fat Pat and Cecilia Ward)	Double D; Noke D (co.)	4:42
8.	"Do What You Wanna Do" (performed by D-Gotti, Tyte Eyes and ESG)	Noke D; Double D (co.)	4:26
9.	"Sacrificez" (performed by D-Gotti, Dren, Double D and H.A.W.K.)	Double D	3:28
10.	"Jus Ride" (performed by Double D, Mr. 3-2 and Pymp Tyte)	Double D	2:57
11.	"Wreckshop" (performed by Pymp Tyte, D-Gotti and Fat Pat)	Noke D	5:03
12.	"2000" (performed by D-Gotti, Double D, Granpappy Mafioso and D-Reck)	Double D	4:11
13.	"I'm So Fly" (performed by Ronnie Spencer)	Noke D; Chicken Hawk (co.)	4:48
14.	"I.O.U." (performed by Pymp Tyte)	Danny Jackson	4:08
15.	"Dreamz" (performed by Fat Pat, H.A.W.K. and Mack)	Chicken Hawk; Prowla	4:04
16.	"Supa Hoe Layer" (performed by Double D, Granpappy Mafioso and Noke D)	Double D	4:54
17.	"Holla at Cha Later" (performed by D-Gotti, Double D, South Park Mexican, Chicken Hawk and Tyte Eyes)	Double D	4:12
Total length:			1:06:50
