= Purple World =

Studio album by Big Moe
- Released: April 23, 2002
- Recorded: 2001–2002
- Studio: Southside (Houston, TX); Holman Sound and Design (Houston, TX); Wreckshop (Houston, TX)
- Genre: Southern hip-hop
- Length: 1:02:57
- Label: Wreckshop; Priority; Capitol
- Producer: Blue; Noke D; Salih Williams; T-Gray

Big Moe chronology
City of Syrup (2000)	Purple World (2002)	Moe Life... (2003)

Professional ratings
Review scores
Source	Rating
AllMusic	4/5 stars
RapReviews	7/10
Spin	9/10

Purple World is the second solo studio album by the American rapper Big Moe. It was released on April 23, 2002, via Wreckshop/Priority Records. The recording sessions took place at Southside Studios, Holman Sound And Design and Wreckshop Studios, in Houston. The album was produced by Salih Williams, Blue, Noke D, and T-Gray. It features guest appearances from D-Gotti, Dirty $, D-Reck, Noke D, Ronnie Spencer, Toon, Tyte Eyes, Big Pokey, Isis Ré, K-Luv, Z-Ro, Big Hawk, Enjoli, Lil' Flip, Lil' Keke, Mr. 3-2, Pimp C, Ronnetta Spencer, Salih Williams, Trademark, Project Pat, the 1st Lady, and Momma Moe. The album peaked at number 29 on the Billboard 200 and number 3 on the Top R&B/Hip-Hop Albums charts.

== Track listing ==
No.	Title	Writer(s)	Producer(s)	Length
1.	"Intro" (Skit)			0:24
2.	"Purple World" (featuring D-Reck, Tyte Eyes, D Gotti and Dirty $)	Kenneth Moore; Derrick Dixon; Tyson Duplechain; Darrell Monroe; Alex Johnson	T-Gray	4:13
3.	"S.U.C." (featuring Big Hawk and Lil' Keke)	Kenneth Moore; John Hawkins; Marcus Edwards; Derrick Haynes; A. Johnson; Ralph MacDonald; William Salter; Bill Withers	Blue	4:02
4.	"Confidential Playa" (featuring Tyte Eyes, Ronnie Spencer and Z-Ro)	Duplechain; Joseph McVey; Haynes	Blue	3:58
5.	"Purple Stuff" (featuring D Gotti)	Monroe; Salih Williams; Haynes; A. Johnson	Salih Williams	3:14
6.	"When I" (featuring D Gotti)	Monroe	Salih Williams	3:02
7.	"Doctor's Office (Skit)" (featuring Momma Moe)			1:43
8.	"Still Da Barre Baby" (featuring Ronnetta Spencer)	Haynes	Salih Williams	2:40
9.	"Cash" (featuring D-Reck and Pimp C)	Kenneth Moore; Dixon; Chad Butler; Haynes	Blue	4:34
10.	"Dime Piece (Skit)" (featuring K-Love and Toon)			0:36
11.	"Dime Piece" (featuring Salih Williams, Tyte Eyes and Isis Ré)	S. Williams; Duplechain; Haynes	Salih Williams	3:16
12.	"Feel Me" (featuring K-Love, Toon and Noke D)	Kenneth Moore; Kerry Moore; Watasha Toon; Haynes; Tharron Rodgers; Harold Lee Clayton; Sigidi Bashir Abdullah	Noke D	4:15
13.	"It's About to Go Down" (featuring Noke D, 3-2, D Gotti, Lil' Flip and Toon)	Haynes; Christopher Barriere; Monroe; Wesley E. Weston; Toon; Shawn Carter; Pharrell Williams; Chad Hugo; James Johnson; Christopher Wallace; Todd Shaw; Sean Combs; Deric Angelettie; Kit Walker; Mason Betha	Blue	4:12
14.	"The Letter" (featuring Enjoli)	Enjoli Parker; S. Williams; Haynes; A. Johnson; Joe Thomas; Jolyon Skinner; Michelle Williams	Salih Williams	3:24
15.	"Mashin' for Mine" (featuring Isis Ré, Noke D and Dirty $)	Haynes; A. Johnson; S. Williams; Denzil Foster; Thomas McElroy; Jay King; Steve Boone; John Sebastian; Mark Sebastian	Salih Williams	4:33
16.	"We Won't Stop" (featuring Z-Ro and Dirty $)	McVey; A. Johnson	Noke D	3:05
17.	"Thug Thang" (featuring Big Pokey, Dirty $, D-Reck, D Gotti and The 1st Lady)	Kenneth Moore; Milton Powell; A. Johnson; Dixon; Monroe; Haynes	Salih Williams	3:14
18.	"Parlay" (featuring Trademark and Ronnie Spencer)	Rodgers	Salih Williams	4:22
19.	"Purple Stuff (Remix)" (featuring Project Pat, Big Pokey, D Gotti and Ronnie Spencer)	Kenneth Moore; Powell; Monroe; Haynes	Salih Williams	4:10
Total length:				1:02:57

Sample credits

- Track 3 contains replayed elements from "Just the Two of Us" written by Ralph MacDonald, William Salter and Bill Withers.
- Track 12 contains replayed elements from "Take Your Time (Do It Right)" written by Harold Lee Clayton and Sigidi Bashir Abdullah.
- Track 13 contains replayed elements from "I Just Wanna Love U (Give It 2 Me)" written by Shawn Carter, Pharrell Williams, Chad Hugo, James Johnson, Christopher Wallace, Todd Shaw, Sean Combs, Deric Angelettie, Kit Walker and Mason Betha.
- Track 14 contains replayed elements from "I Wanna Know Your Name" written by Joe Thomas, Jolyon Skinner and Michelle Williams.
- Track 15 contains replayed elements from "Heavy on My Mind" written by Denzil Foster, Thomas McElroy and Jay King and "Summer in the City" written by Steve Boone, John Sebastian and Mark Sebastian.

== Personnel ==
- Kenneth "Big Moe" Moore – main artist
- Derrick "D-Reck" Dixon – featured artist (tracks: 2, 9, 17), executive producer
- Tyson "Tyte Eyes" Duplechain – featured artist (tracks: 2, 4, 11)
- Darrell "D-Gotti" Monroe – featured artist (tracks: 2, 5, 6, 13, 17, 19)
- Dirty $ – featured artist (tracks: 2, 15–17)
- John "Big Hawk" Hawkins – featured artist (track 3)
- Marcus "Lil' Keke" Edwards – featured artist (track 3)
- Ronnie Spencer – featured artist (tracks: 4, 18, 19)
- Joseph "Z-Ro" McVey – featured artist (tracks: 4, 16)
- Momma Moe – featured artist (track 7)
- Ronnetta Spencer – featured artist (track 8)
- Chad "Pimp C" Butler – featured artist (track 9)
- K-Luv – featured artist (tracks: 10, 12)
- Watasha Toon – featured artist (tracks: 10, 12, 13)
- Salih Williams – featured artist (track 11), producer (tracks: 5, 6, 8, 11, 14, 15, 17–19), mixing
- Isis Ré – featured artist (tracks: 11, 15)
- Noke D. – featured artist (tracks: 12, 13, 15), producer (tracks: 12, 16), mixing
- Christopher "Mr. 3-2" Barriere – featured artist (track 13)
- Wesley "Lil' Flip" Weston – featured artist (track 13)
- Enjoli Parker – featured artist (track 14)
- Milton "Big Pokey" Powell – featured artist (tracks: 17, 19)
- The 1st Lady – featured artist (track 17)
- Trademark – featured artist (track 18)
- Patrick "Project Pat" Houston – featured artist (track 19)
- Blue – producer (tracks: 3, 4, 9, 13)
- T-Gray – producer (track 2)
- Greg Morgenstein – mixing
- Marvin Watkins – A&R
- Kevin Faist – A&R

== Charts ==
Chart (2002)	Peak position
US Billboard 200	29
US Top R&B/Hip-Hop Albums (Billboard)	3
