= C-Note (rapper) =

American rapper (born 1974)

- Born: Courtney Smith; December 5, 1974 (age 51); Houston, Texas, US
- Genre: Hip hop
- Occupation: Rapper
- Years active: 1992-present
- Label: Big Shot Records

Courtney Smith (born December 5, 1974), known professionally by his stage name C-Note, is an American rapper from Houston, Texas. He is a member of the Botany Boyz, part of the Screwed Up Click scene first started by DJ Screw.

His first solo album, Third Coast Born, was an underground success, eventually reaching #67 on Billboard's Top R&B/Hip Hop Albums chart. The album was revamped and re-released in 2000, and this also peaked at #91 on the same chart. C-Note has released several albums since then, and made numerous guest appearances (including with Fat Pat, Lil' Flip and Z-Ro). His fourth full-length, Network'n, was released in 2006, and his fifth, Birds Vs Words, in 2016.

== Discography ==
=== Studio albums ===
- Third Coast Born (1999)
- Third Coast Born 2000 (2000)
- Street Fame (2003)
- Network'n (2006)
- Birds Vs Words (2016)

=== Mixtapes ===
- Tales From Da Clover (2005)
- 100% Beef (2005)
