= Fat Pat =

American rapper (1970–1998)

- Hawkins in 1997

Background information
- Born: Patrick Lamark Hawkins; December 4, 1970; Houston, Texas, U.S.
- Died: February 3, 1998 (aged 27) Houston, Texas, U.S.
- Genres: Hip-hop; Southern hip-hop
- Occupation: Rapper
- Years active: 1993–1998
- Labels: Screwed Up Click; Wreckshop

Patrick Lamark Hawkins (December 4, 1970 – February 3, 1998), better known by his stage name Fat Pat (also known as Mr. Fat Pat), was an American rapper from Houston, Texas, who was a member of DEA (Dead End Alliance) with his brother John "Big Hawk" Hawkins, DJ Screw, and Kay-K, all original members of the Screwed Up Click (S.U.C.).

Wreckshop Records released his first two albums, Ghetto Dreams and Throwed in da Game in 1998 after his death. Later releases were on the Screwed Up Click label.

== Murder ==
On February 3, 1998, Hawkins was fatally shot by an unknown gunman at 10440 South Drive, Houston, Texas, after going to a promoter's apartment to collect an appearance fee. The promoter was not home, and he was shot in the corridor outside the apartment. He was 27 years old. Fat Pat's murder still remains unsolved.

Eight years later, his brother, rapper Big Hawk, was also shot to death by an unknown assailant.

== Legacy ==
Houston-based UFC heavyweight contender Derrick Lewis uses Fat Pat's 1998 single "Tops Drop" as his walkout song when he fights, including when he fought Ciryl Gane for the UFC Heavyweight Championship at UFC 265 in Houston. Comedian Shane Gillis used the same track as his intro music for his 2023 Netflix comedy special "Beautiful Dogs". The Houston Cougars men's basketball team uses "Tops Drop" as its intro song for home games at the Fertitta Center. As reported by the Houston Press, well over a decade since Hawkins' death, his music continues to be played heavily in the Houston area.

== Discography ==
=== Albums ===
- 1998: Ghetto Dreams
- 1998: Throwed in da Game
- 2001: Fat Pat's Greatest Hits
- 2004: Since The Gray Tapes
- 2005: Since The Gray Tapes Vol. 2
- 2008: I Had a Ghetto Dream
- 2025: Dreams To Reality: A Tribute to Fat Pat

=== With Dead End Alliance ===
- 1998: Screwed for Life

=== Singles ===
Year	Song	U.S. Hot 100	U.S. R&B	U.S. Rap	Album
1998	"Tops Drop"	-	46	5	Ghetto Dreams

=== Featured singles ===
Year	Song	U.S. Hot 100	U.S. R&B	U.S. Rap	Album
1997	"25 Lighters" (DJ DMD featuring Lil' Keke & Fat Pat)	-	-	-	Twenty-Two: P.A. World Wide
1999	"Wanna Be a Baller" (Lil Troy featuring Fat Pat & Big Hawk)	70	40	31	Sittin' Fat Down South
2006	"Swang" (Trae featuring Fat Pat & Big Hawk)	-	-	-	Restless

== See also ==
- 27 Club
- Houston hip-hop
- List of murdered hip hop musicians
- List of unsolved murders (1980–1999)
