= DJ Screw =

American hip hop DJ (1971–2000)

- DJ Screw in 1997

Background information
- Born: Robert Earl Davis Jr. July 20, 1971; Smithville, Texas, U.S
- Died: November 16, 2000 (aged 29) Houston, Texas, U.S.
- Genres: Chopped and screwed; Southern hip hop; gangsta rap; psychedelic hip hop
- Occupations: Disc jockey; rapper; record producer
- Instruments: turntables (Technics SL-1200); DJ mixer; vocals; sampler (E-mu SP-1200); drum machine (Roland TR-808)
- Years active: 1983–2000
- Labels: Screwed Up; Bigtyme; Wreckshop
- Formerly of: Screwed Up Click

Robert Earl Davis Jr. (July 20, 1971 – November 16, 2000), better known by his stage name DJ Screw, was an American hip hop DJ based in Houston, Texas, and best known as the creator of the chopped and screwed DJ technique. He was a central and influential figure in the Houston hip hop community and was the leader of Houston's Screwed Up Click.

Davis released over 350 mixtapes and was recognized as an innovator mostly on a regional level until his death from a codeine overdose in 2000. His legacy was discovered by a wider audience around 2005, and has gone on to influence a wide variety of artists.

== Early life ==
Robert Earl Davis, Jr. was born in Smithville, Texas. His father, Robert Earl Davis Sr., was a long-haul truck driver based in Houston. His mother, Ida May Deary, who had a young daughter from a previous marriage, came to the Smithville area to be with her mother when her son was born in 1971. She later returned to Houston, but the marriage was floundering. Soon it would be over, and she and her kids moved to Los Angeles for a couple of years, then back to Houston, and returned to Smithville in 1980 when Davis was age nine.

When he was young, Davis had aspirations of being a truck driver like his father. However, seeing the 1984 hit break dancing movie Breakin' and discovering his mother's turntable attracted him to music. He took piano lessons and had drums set up in his living room, but ultimately felt uninspired with both. His musical interest shifted as he took his mother's B.B. King and Johnnie Taylor records and scratched them on the turntable the way DJs did, slowing the spinning disc and then allowing it to speed back up, playing with sound.

Davis began buying records of his own and would spin with his friend Trey Adkins, who would rhyme. According to Adkins, "Screw had a jam box and he hooked up two turntables to it and made a fader out of the radio tuner so he could deejay." Adkins said if Davis disliked a record, he would deface it with a screw. One day Adkins asked him, "Who do you think you are, DJ Screw?" Davis liked the sound of the nickname and, in turn, gave his friend the name "Shorty Mac".

== Career ==
"The results of D.J. Screw's labors often sound like rap records played underwater on an old cassette deck that's running out of batteries and needs its tape heads cleaned. It is not music to dance to but music to lose yourself in, as if it is the last sound echoing in your head as you drift off to sleep."

— The New York Times

Davis began DJing at age 12 in 1983, and started his trademark slowed-down mixes in 1990. This style became his main focus in late 1991 and early 1992. The mixes began as special compilations requested by friends and those in the know. He soon made them available for sale when his close friend Toe offered to buy a mix from him for ten dollars. At that point, customers had increasingly begun requesting his more well-known mixes instead of personalized lists. During the early 1990s, he invited some of the Houston MCs from the city's south side to rhyme on those mixes. This coalition of emcees eventually became the fathers of the Screwed Up Click. Many members of the Screwed Up Click, or S.U.C., are considered key figures in the canon of Houston hip hop. The original lineup included Lil KeKe, Big Hawk, Big Moe, E.S.G., and Fat Pat, among others. The crew later gained then upcoming artists such as, Z-Ro, Trae tha Truth as well as Lil’ Flip. His career began to advance once he met Russell Washington of BigTyme Recordz and signed to the label.

Davis later moved to a house in the 7600 block of Greenstone Street near Gulfgate Mall. Fans, some driving from far away areas such as Dallas and Waco, lined up at his door to obtain his recordings. He started his own business and opened a shop up on 7717 Cullen Blvd in Houston, TX, called Screwed Up Records and Tapes. It has been shown in numerous music videos and documentaries as well as independent films. In the early 2010s, this location closed. It has since been relocated to 3538 West Fuqua, Houston, TX. Fans may also purchase merchandise, including mixtapes, on the S.U.C. website. There are now several Screwed Up Records and Tapes spread out through Texas, including one in Beaumont and in Austin.

== Death and legacy ==
On November 16, 2000, Davis was found dead inside his Houston recording studio in the 8100 block of Commerce Park Drive. Fans speculated about the true cause of his death. When the coroner reports were released, they confirmed that he died of a codeine overdose in addition to mixed drug intoxication. The codeine came from a prescription-strength cough syrup that he would mix with soda to make lean ("purple drank"). In addition to codeine, Valium and PCP were found in his blood. His funeral took place at Mount Pilgrim Baptist Church in his hometown of Smithville, Texas.

Davis has been a considerable influence in the Houston scene and beyond, "helping to cement his legacy as an underappreciated avant-gardist, creator of a sui generis sound that's still growing and mutating." Texas governor Rick Perry honored him by making him an official 'Texas Music Pioneer'. Houston Press named the 1995 album 3 'n the Mornin' (Part Two) as no. 13 on its list of the 25 best Houston rap albums of all time, crediting the release for the way it helped shape Houston's hip-hop culture. When the Houston hip-hop scene became nationally prominent in 2004, many of the biggest acts could be traced to Davis's crew, the Screwed Up Click. Many artists outside of Houston rap have been influenced by Davis's work, including experimental electronic artists such as Oneohtrix Point Never, Balam Acab, How to Dress Well, and Rabit.

The genre shown by Davis has since evolved into a Houston-based subculture that is associated with the recreational consumption of codeine, opulent jewelry, and elaborate vintage vehicles. Davis has also left behind a cult following of listeners who self-identify as "screwheads". A music festival and car show in honor of DJ Screw was set up in 2006. The inaugural DJ Screwfest featured 200 vehicles and a set list featuring notable Houston hip-hop acts like Trae and Chingo Bling. The first festival took place at the Pasadena County Fairgrounds. The 2007 documentary film Screwed In Houston, produced by VBS/Vice Magazine, details the history of the Houston hip hop scene and the influence of the chopped and screwed sub-culture on Houston hip hop. The five-part series devotes one full episode to DJ Screw and includes video footage of him mixing records, which originates from the Soldiers United for Cash documentary.

Principal photography for the Soldiers United for Cash documentary took place in 2000. The 2-hour documentary, created by filmmaker REL of REL Entertainment, LLC, includes in-depth interviews with Davis and the Screwed Up Click, as well as exclusive performances, music videos and freestyles. Davis's primary interview and performance was filmed October 28–29, 2000 in Houston, TX.

The University of Houston Libraries Houston Hip Hop Research Collection houses the DJ Screw Papers, including approximately 1,500 vinyl records owned by Davis, original DJ Screw recordings, photographs, handwritten track lists, and more. Some of these materials have been digitized.

American rapper Travis Scott, a Houston native, has cited Davis as one of his biggest musical influences and has paid tribute to him throughout his career. On Scott's debut mixtape, Owl Pharaoh (2013), the song "Drive" opens with a sample of Davis's voice. Scott's 2018 album Astroworld references Davis's music on three tracks, including the dedicated song "R.I.P. Screw".

In January 2020, the musical tribute All Screwed Up was revealed, detailing the life and events of Davis. Directed by Isaac Yowman, it was previewed at the Houston Cinema Arts Festival in November 2020 before releasing the following month. Sony later announced that a film adaptation was in development, also directed Yowman. In November 2022, Travis Scott was announced as the film's executive producer, coming after he and Yowman discussed ideas for over an hour and bonded over their mutual love of Davis's work. No date for release has been announced.

== Discography ==
=== Albums released while living ===
| Year | Title | Label |
|---|---|---|
| 1994 | 3 'n the Mornin': Part One | Bigtyme Recordz |
| 1994 | Still Afloat Vol. I | Bigtyme Recordz |
| 1995 | All Screwed Up, Vol. II | Bigtyme Recordz |
| 1996 | 3 'N The Mornin' (Part Two) [Blue] | Bigtyme Recordz |
| 1998 | 3 'n the Mornin': Part Two [Red] | Bigtyme Recordz |
| 1999 | All Work No Play Vol. I | Jam Down Records |
| 1999 | Disc 2 of SPM's Power Moves: The Table | Dope House Records |

=== Posthumously released albums ===
| Year | Title | Label |
|---|---|---|
| 2001 | The Legend | Bigtyme Recordz |
| 2002 | All Work No Play, Vol. 2 | Reliant Entertainment |
| 2002 | Soldiers United For Cash | TJ Music/REL Entertainment, LLC |
| 2016 | 3 `N The Mornin`(20th Anniversary DE) | Bigtyme Recordz/SoSouth |

=== Nationally distributed biopic TV series ===
| Year | Title | Label |
|---|---|---|
| 2020 | All Screwed Up | IYO Visuals |

=== Nationally distributed documentary films ===
| Year | Title | Label |
|---|---|---|
| 2001 | Soldiers United for Cash VHS | REL Entertainment, LLC |
| 2004 | Soldiers United for Cash (Collector's Edition) DVD | REL Entertainment, LLC |
| 2007 | Untold Story | |

=== Official Screwtape mixtape series ===
The "Screwtapes" were mixtapes that DJ Screw made himself and mainly sold from his house or when traveling to do shows. Many of his friends freestyled and spoke over the instrumentals and songs.

The mixtapes were re-released after his death in 2000 and given "Diary of the Originator: Chapter" titles. Despite this, they were not re-released chronologically. The works date between 1993 and 2000. New chapters continued to be released.

- Chapter 001: Done Deal
- Chapter 002: Tales From Tha 4
- Chapter 003: Duck Sick
- Chapter 004: Choppin' Game Wit Toe
- Chapter 005: Still A G At 27
- Chapter 006: Down South Hustlers
- Chapter 007: Ballin' In Da Mall
- Chapter 008: Let's Call Up On Drank
- Chapter 009: Makin' Cash Forever
- Chapter 010: Southside Still Holdin
- Chapter 011: Headed 2 Da Classic
- Chapter 012: June 27th
- Chapter 013: Leanin On A Switch
- Chapter 014: Sippin' Codeine
- Chapter 015: The Next Episode
- Chapter 016: Late Night Fuckin’ Yo Bitch
- Chapter 017: Show Up And Pour Up
- Chapter 018: Killuminati
- Chapter 019: 'N 2 Deep
- Chapter 020: Crumbs To Bricks
- Chapter 021: The World Is Mine
- Chapter 022: P's And Q's
- Chapter 023: Dancing Candy
- Chapter 024: 9 Months Later
- Chapter 025: Unpredictable
- Chapter 026: Blowin' Big Behind Tint
- Chapter 027: Plots And Schemes
- Chapter 028: Worldwide Southside
- Chapter 029: Saturday Nite Live
- Chapter 030: G Love
- Chapter 031: 2000 Tears
- Chapter 032: G-Code
- Chapter 033: G'd Up Shit
- Chapter 034: It's A Dirty World
- Chapter 035: Charge It To The Game
- Chapter 036: Who Next With Plex
- Chapter 037: 10201
- Chapter 038: Headed 2 Da League
- Chapter 039: One Life To Live
- Chapter 040: Yellowstone vs. The Nation
- Chapter 041: Ghetto Fabulous
- Chapter 042: Popped Up Smoked Up
- Chapter 043: Independence Day
- Chapter 044: Eyes On The Prize
- Chapter 045: 100% Business
- Chapter 046: Syrup and Soda
- Chapter 047: Pussy, Weed And Alcohol
- Chapter 048: Gallon 1
- Chapter 049: Codeine Fiend
- Chapter 050: Money Over Bitches
- Chapter 051: 9 Fo Shit
- Chapter 052: Only Rollin' Red
- Chapter 053: Y 2 Grey
- Chapter 054: No Haters Allowed
- Chapter 055: Back On The Streets
- Chapter 056: Blue Ova Grey
- Chapter 057: Wineberry Over Gold
- Chapter 058: You Don't Work You Don't Eat
- Chapter 059: Southside Most Wanted
- Chapter 060: All Day In The Trey
- Chapter 061: Niggas Can't See Me
- Chapter 062: Dead End Hustler For Life
- Chapter 063: Mourn U Till I Join You
- Chapter 064: Locked N Da Game
- Chapter 065: Road To Riches
- Chapter 066: Layed Back Rollin
- Chapter 067: Back In Tha Deck
- Chapter 068: Tre World
- Chapter 069: Southside Riders
- Chapter 070: Endonesia
- Chapter 071: The Final Chapter
- Chapter 072: Off The Head
- Chapter 073: Don't Make Dollars Don't Make Sense
- Chapter 074: Mash For My Dream
- Chapter 075: Ridin' High
- Chapter 076: Black Hearted
- Chapter 077: Only The Real
- Chapter 078: Nobody Does It Better
- Chapter 079: Ain't Nuthin' Better
- Chapter 080: Hold Ya Head
- Chapter 081: Screwed Up Texas
- Chapter 082: 98 Live
- Chapter 083: Ball 2 U Fall
- Chapter 084: Str8 Puttin' It Down
- Chapter 085: Riches Over Bitches
- Chapter 086: Gees Nite Out
- Chapter 087: Shinnin' Like The Sun
- Chapter 088: Blasphemy
- Chapter 089: Outlaws
- Chapter 090: 4th Of July
- Chapter 091: Take It How You Wanna
- Chapter 092: Back N Yo Ear
- Chapter 093: Da Reunion
- Chapter 094: Still Hoopin'
- Chapter 095: Sittin' On Top Of The World
- Chapter 096: Can't Hold Ya Hand
- Chapter 097: Players Choppin Game
- Chapter 098: Four Corners Of The World
- Chapter 099: Shot Callin'
- Chapter 100: Platinum Shit
- Chapter 101: Graduation 99
- Chapter 102: 3 Years Later
- Chapter 103: Popped Up Sittin Low
- Chapter 104: Sittin' Sideways
- Chapter 105: Everyday Allday
- Chapter 106: On A Pint
- Chapter 107: It's All Good
- Chapter 108: 3 'N Da Mornin’
- Chapter 109: Einstein
- Chapter 110: Feel My Pain
- Chapter 111: Shit Don't Stop
- Chapter 112: Jammin' Screw
- Chapter 113: Barre
- Chapter 114: Bow Down
- Chapter 115: Down And Out
- Chapter 116: Straight From The Heart
- Chapter 117: Return Of The Red
- Chapter 118: Laftex
- Chapter 119: No Drank
- Chapter 120: 10 Deep
- Chapter 121: Another Day Another Dollar
- Chapter 122: Facin' Time
- Chapter 123: Snitches
- Chapter 124: Hurricane Duck
- Chapter 125: Ooh Wee Man
- Chapter 126: If The Price Is Right
- Chapter 127: Southside Holdin'
- Chapter 128: It's Gonna Get Better
- Chapter 129: In Yo Face
- Chapter 130: Back 2 The Lab
- Chapter 131: Syrup Sippers
- Chapter 132: Can't Fade It
- Chapter 133: Money By The Ton
- Chapter 134: Hard Times
- Chapter 135: Steady Dippin'
- Chapter 136: Da Funk Is On Your Mind
- Chapter 137: Blue 22
- Chapter 138: Are U Still Down
- Chapter 139: 2 Liters
- Chapter 140: Symptoms Of A Thug
- Chapter 141: Another Platinum Hit
- Chapter 142: All Work No Play
- Chapter 143: Million Dollar Boys
- Chapter 144: Heavy 'N Tha Game
- Chapter 145: S.U.C. For Life
- Chapter 146: Only Time Will Tell
- Chapter 147: Niggas & Flys
- Chapter 148: Do You Feel Me
- Chapter 149: Beatin Up Da Block
- Chapter 150: Mind On My Money
- Chapter 151: Mo Money
- Chapter 152: Pullin' On Yo Curve
- Chapter 153: Drankin' On A Gallon
- Chapter 154: Pop Trunk
- Chapter 155: No Love
- Chapter 156: 100 Minutes Of Realness
- Chapter 157: Goin' Fed
- Chapter 158: Squarin' It Off
- Chapter 159: Out The Shop
- Chapter 160: Hail Mary
- Chapter 161: Same Ol' G
- Chapter 162: Unlady Like
- Chapter 163: Mashing 'N Millenium Mode
- Chapter 164: Southside Connection
- Chapter 165: Street Fame
- Chapter 166: Telephone Love
- Chapter 167: A Million Dollars Later
- Chapter 168: No Time For Bullshit
- Chapter 169: Still Standing
- Chapter 170: Wreckshop
- Chapter 171: Freestyle Kings
- Chapter 172: Straight Wreckin'
- Chapter 173: 99 Live
- Chapter 174: D.E.A. Bootcamp
- Chapter 175: Players Ball
- Chapter 176: Robin St. 4 Life
- Chapter 177: In God We Trust
- Chapter 178: In The Zone
- Chapter 179: Mind Over Matter
- Chapter 180: 3 'N Da Morning Pt. II
- Chapter 181: Grey In The Deck
- Chapter 182: Ridin' Dirty
- Chapter 183: In The Do
- Chapter 184: Going Hard
- Chapter 185: Staying Down
- Chapter 186: Thug Life
- Chapter 187: Dead End Representative
- Chapter 188: Pay Like U Way
- Chapter 189: Another Day Another Dub
- Chapter 190: 3-4 Action
- Chapter 191: Southsiders
- Chapter 192: High Till I Die
- Chapter 193: Something 4 Dat Trunk
- Chapter 194: Thangs Done Changed
- Chapter 195: Fear No Man
- Chapter 196: Sugar Hill
- Chapter 197: Elmtree Crawfish
- Chapter 198: Uncut Funk
- Chapter 199: Street Dreams
- Chapter 200: Ain't No Sleepin’
- Chapter 201: Players Nite Out
- Chapter 202: Still In Da Game
- Chapter 203: Almost On Dem Streets
- Chapter 204: The Meadows
- Chapter 205: Slippin' Red
- Chapter 206: Haters Stay Away
- Chapter 207: Goin' All Out
- Chapter 208: Austin 2 Houston Pt. II
- Chapter 209: Deep Down South
- Chapter 210: Bangin' Down The Strip
- Chapter 211: Off Parole
- Chapter 212: Still Hustlin'
- Chapter 213: Made Niggaz
- Chapter 214: Old School
- Chapter 215: South Side Players
- Chapter 216: Flippin' On A Sunny Day
- Chapter 217: Sittin' On Chrome
- Chapter 218: Way 2 Real
- Chapter 219: Leanin In The Leans
- Chapter 220: Player Memories
- Chapter 221: 2 Pints Deep
- Chapter 222: My Block
- Chapter 223: Trey Day
- Chapter 224: 97 Live
- Chapter 225: Back Up In You
- Chapter 226: Million Dollar Hands
- Chapter 227: We Don't Bar It
- Chapter 228: Back On The Grind
- Chapter 229: Thugs Night Out
- Chapter 230: Paying Dues
- Chapter 231: Love 4 The Hood
- Chapter 232: Tryin 2 Survive
- Chapter 233: Finally Made It
- Chapter 234: Still A G At 23
- Chapter 235: Flippin 2 Da Classic Pt. II
- Chapter 236: Screw & Blunt
- Chapter 237: Dope Dealin & Cap Peelin
- Chapter 238: On The Real
- Chapter 239: 3-D
- Chapter 240: That Classic
- Chapter 241: Hurtin These Boys
- Chapter 242: Puttin It Down
- Chapter 243: Commin Up Quick
- Chapter 244: It Don't Stop
- Chapter 245: Waitin On Slant
- Chapter 246: Willow Glen
- Chapter 247: Sudden Death
- Chapter 248: 380 D On That Ass
- Chapter 249: 12/16/1972
- Chapter 250: Da Return
- Chapter 251: Stressed Out
- Chapter 252: Separatin Da Real From Da Fake
- Chapter 253: Stayin Sucka Free
- Chapter 254: Fresh Out The County
- Chapter 255: Elimination
- Chapter 256: Screw & Doug
- Chapter 257: All About Pat
- Chapter 258: Fuck The World
- Chapter 259: Somethin' 4 U Haters
- Chapter 260: Bar It 4 What
- Chapter 261: R.I.P. Tee Lee
- Chapter 262: Clay & Screw
- Chapter 263: Nard & Screw
- Chapter 264: Screw Dub '96
- Chapter 265: Shay & Screw
- Chapter 266: Till Death Do Us PART
- Chapter 267: 4 Young Gees
- Chapter 268: Dave & Screw
- Chapter 269: Lil Rob Personal
- Chapter 270: D Pac & Screw
- Chapter 271: Screw & Terrance
- Chapter 272: Screw Dub '95
- Chapter 273: So Much Pain
- Chapter 274: Still Thuggin Pt. II
- Chapter 275: Screw Dub '95
- Chapter 276: Herschelwood
- Chapter 277: Shootin Slugs
- Chapter 278: Lil Chuck & Screw
- Chapter 279: Just Another Tight Screw
- Chapter 280: 5:00 AM
- Chapter 281: Stackin Paper
- Chapter 282: Sprinkle Me '97
- Chapter 283: Screw Dub '98
- Chapter 284: So Many Ways
- Chapter 285: Yellowstone Texas '95
- Chapter 286: Out On Bond '95
- Chapter 287: Floss Mode '96
- Chapter 288: Fuck You Haters
- Chapter 289: In Yo Ear
- Chapter 290: Tolu
- Chapter 291: One Year Later
- Chapter 292: Cloverland
- Chapter 293: Screw & Piccolo
- Chapter 294: Jut & Screw
- Chapter 295: Screw Dub
- Chapter 296: '96 Live
- Chapter 297: Stick 1 & Screw
- Chapter 298: Together Forever
- Chapter 299: Screw Dub 94 – 3rd Ward/Herschelwood
- Chapter 300: Hell Raiser/Screw Dub
- Chapter 301: Smoke One/Smoke Two '91 (1992)
- Chapter 302: DJ Screw & Lante '94
- Chapter 303: ESG '94
- Chapter 304: 3rd Ward Freestyle ’98/4th Ward Freestyle '95
- Chapter 305: Dre & Screw '95
- Chapter 306: Herschelwood Click '94
- Chapter 307: BC & Screw '97
- Chapter 308: Mantny & Screw '95
- Chapter 309: Hen Duce & Screw '95
- Chapter 310: Big G
- Chapter 311: 1 Deep/Stick 1 '94
- Chapter 312: Poppy & Screw '97
- Chapter 313: South Side '94
- Chapter 314: Mann Phoo
- Chapter 315: Live From Club Nouveau '97
- Chapter 316: Live From Club Nouveau '97 Pt. 2
- Chapter 317: Screw Dub '97
- Chapter 318: Screw Dub Stick 1 '98
- Chapter 319: Floyd & Screw '98
- Chapter 320: On A Mission
- Chapter 321: Still Thuggin Pt. 1
- Chapter 322: Houston 2 Austin '95 Pt. 1
- Chapter 323: March Madness '98
- Chapter 324: Dusk 2 Dawn
- Chapter 325: Screw Dub 325
- Chapter 326: Red Turn Heads
- Chapter 327: ESG Live At Screw House '94
- Chapter 328: Screw Dub 328
- Chapter 329: Big Mello '92 / Botany Boys '93 (both sides 1993)
- Chapter 330: Live From Club Nouveau '97 Pt. 3
- Chapter 331: Live From Club Nouveau '97 Pt. 4
- Chapter 332: Live From Club Nouveau '97 Pt. 5
- Chapter 333: Live From Club Nouveau '97 Pt. 6
- Chapter 334: Live From Club Nouveau '97 Pt. 7
- Chapter 335: Live From Club Nouveau '97 Pt. 8
- Chapter 336: Live From Club Nouveau '97 Pt. 9
- Chapter 337: Gettin On Bout Mine '95
- Chapter 338: Screw Dub '94 338
- Chapter 339: G Town C Side '95
- Chapter 340: 4th Ward '95
- Chapter 341: Smoke On
- Chapter 342: Club New Jack '91 (1992)
- Chapter 343: What's Really Goin On '95
- Chapter 344: Stayin Down Pt.2 '95
- Chapter 345: Got It On My Mind '96
- Chapter 346: Crawlin Down On Boys
- Chapter 347: Ghetto Thugs '97/'94 Flows
- Chapter 348: Shuttin A Door '95
- Chapter 349: Funky Ride
- Chapter 350: 2000
- Chapter 351: New 2000
- Chapter 352: 2000 Freestyle
- Chapter 353: Baytown 94'
- Chapter 354: comin out that 4 95
- Chapter 355: the bull 2000
- Chapter 356: it takes a bankroll 95
- Chapter 357: same old shit 95
- Chapter 358: 123 action
- Chapter 359: no name 2 94
- Chapter 360: Straight linin
- Chapter 361: you cant see me 95
- Chapter 362: no name 1 94
- Chapter 363: Trey Ward 95
- Chapter 364: live from club nouveau 97

=== Appearances ===
- E.S.G. – Ocean Of Funk (1994)
- Aggravated – Accept (1995)
- Al-D – Home Of The Free (1995)
- E.S.G. – Sailin' Da South (1995)
- Al-D – Mind At Ease (1996)
- Mr. 3-2 – The Wicked Buddah Baby (1996)
- Big Floyd - Sittin On Top Of The World (1996)
- Point Blank – N Tha Doe (1997)
- 5th Ward Soundtrack (1997)
- Botany Boyz – Thought of Many Ways (1997)
- DJ DMD – Eleven (1997)
- Lil Keke – Don't Mess With Texas (1997)
- SPM (South Park Mexican) – Power Moves (double disc, 1998)
- Southside Playaz – You Gottus Fuxxed Up (1998)
- Dead End Alliance – Screwed 4 Life (1998)
- Lil Keke – The Commission (1998)
- C-Note – 3rd Coast Born (1999)
- Lil O – Blood Money (1999)
- Rap-a-Lot Records – R.N.D.S. (compilation, 1999)
- Point Blank – Bad News Travels Fast (2000)
- Lil' Flip – The Leprechaun (2000)
- K-Rino – No Mercy (2000)
- Big Hawk – Under H.A.W.K.'s Wings (2000)
- Big Moe – City of Syrup (2000)
- Al-D – Unconditional Luv (2002)
