= Botany Boyz =

American hip hop group

- Origin: Houston, Texas, United States
- Genres: Gangsta rap, southern hip hop, chopped and screwed
- Years active: 1994–present
- Labels: Big Shot, Clover G Records
- Members: B.G. Duke; C-Note; D-Red; Will-Lean
- Past members: Big D-E-Z; B.G. Gator (deceased); Lil 3rd Lil' Head; Pap-Pap

Botany Boyz are a rap group from Houston, Texas, United States. They are the owners of the labels Big Shot Records and Plat-Num Productions.

== History ==
One of the foremost contributors to the Houston screw scene, the Botany Boyz were part of the Screwed Up Click in the early to mid 1990s. The group name is a reference to Botany Lane in the Cloverland area of Houston where they resided.

Their first album, Thought of Many Ways, was released on their own label, Big Shot Records, in 1997; its follow-up, Forever Botany, was released in 1999 and managed to crack the Billboard Top R&B/Hip-Hop charts at #99 in 2000 as the Houston rap scene became more popular across the US. Since then, the members have concentrated more on solo projects, with C-Note being the most successful.

The Botany Boyz were featured on the platinum selling Sittin' Fat Down South, with the single "Chop, Chop, Chop" produced by legendary southern producer Bruce "Grim" Rhodes.

== Members ==
Current members

- B.G. Duke
- C-Note
- D-Red
- Will-Lean

Past members

- Big D-E-Z
- B.G. Gator (deceased)
- Lil' 3rd
- Lil' Head

== Discography ==
=== Studio albums ===
- Thought of Many Ways (1997)
- Forever Botany (2000)

=== Extended plays ===
- Smokin N' Leanin (1995)

=== Solo projects ===
- C-Note - Third Coast Born (1999)
- C-Note - Third Coast Born 2000 (2000)
- D-Red - Smokin' & Lean'n 2000 (2000)
- Will-Lean - The Chemist (2000)
- C-Note - Street Fame (2003)
- D-Red - Still Smokin' & Leanin' Vol. 1 (2004)
- C-Note - Network'n (2006)
- Will-Lean - Mr. Triple Beam (2010)
- C-Note - Birds Vs Words (2016)
