= Big Moe =

American rapper (1974–2007)

- Moore in 2001

Background information
- Also known as: Barre Baby; Drank Baby; MoYo; Modeine; Motorola; Da King of Purp
- Born: Kenneth Doniell Moore; August 20, 1974; Houston, Texas, U.S.
- Died: October 14, 2007 (aged 33) Houston, Texas, U.S.
- Genres: Southern hip hop; chopped and screwed
- Occupations: Rapper; songwriter
- Years active: 1993–2007
- Label: Wreckshop Records
- Formerly of: Screwed Up Click

Kenneth Doniell Moore (August 20, 1974 – October 14, 2007), better known by his stage name Big Moe, was an American rapper from Houston, Texas.

== Early life ==
Kenneth Doniell Moore was born in Houston, Texas on August 20, 1974, and he grew up in Third Ward, southeast Houston. In 1992 he graduated from Yates High School, where he was a football star.

== Career ==
Originating from Houston, Texas, and as one of the founding members of the "Original Screwed Up Click," Big Moe started out in music by freestyling on DJ Screw mixtapes like many of his Houston peers before being signed to Wreckshop Records. Wreckshop Records released Big Moe's debut album, City of Syrup in (2000); the title was a nod to Houston's reputation for drinking codeine-laced syrup, which Moe pours from a Styrofoam cup on the album's cover. The album featured the single "Mann!", which Moe intended to be the South Side's answer to Black Rob's East Coast hit "Whoa!"

In 2002, Moe returned with his second album, Purple World. This release showcased a "who's who" of Houston vocalists and two versions of Moe's breakthrough single, "Purple Stuff." The Willy Wonka and the Chocolate Factory-themed video for "Purple Stuff" was played on MTV, and the album peaked at No. 3 on Billboard's Top R&B/Hip-Hop Albums chart. Big Moe's third and last album, Moe Life, was issued in 2003, including the commercially successful single "Just a Dog." A posthumous album entitled Unfinished Business was released on March 18, 2008, via Wreckshop Records and Koch Records. In 2009 his album City of Syrup was named number 25 on houstonpress.com's list of the 25 Best Houston Hip-Hop Albums.

== Death ==
Moe died on October 14, 2007, at 33 years old, after suffering a heart attack one week earlier that left him in a coma.

== Discography ==
=== Studio albums ===
List of studio albums, with selected chart positions and information
Year	Title	Peak chart positions			
Year	Title	Billboard 200	Top R&B/Hip-Hop Albums	Independent Albums	Heatseekers Albums
2000	City of Syrup: Label: Wreckshop Records	176	52	8	9
2002	Purple World: Label: Wreckshop Records, Priority Records	29	3	—	—
2003	Moe Life...: Label: Wreckshop Records	—	33	29	—
2008	Unfinished Business: Label: Wreckshop Records, Koch Records	—	73	—	—

=== Guest appearances ===
List of single and non-single guest appearances, with other performing artists, showing year released and album name
Title	Year	Other artist(s)	Album
"Ain't No Doubt"	2001	R.W.O., Mr. 3-2, Big T	Book of Game: Chapter 1
Dixie's Land
