= Bun B discography =

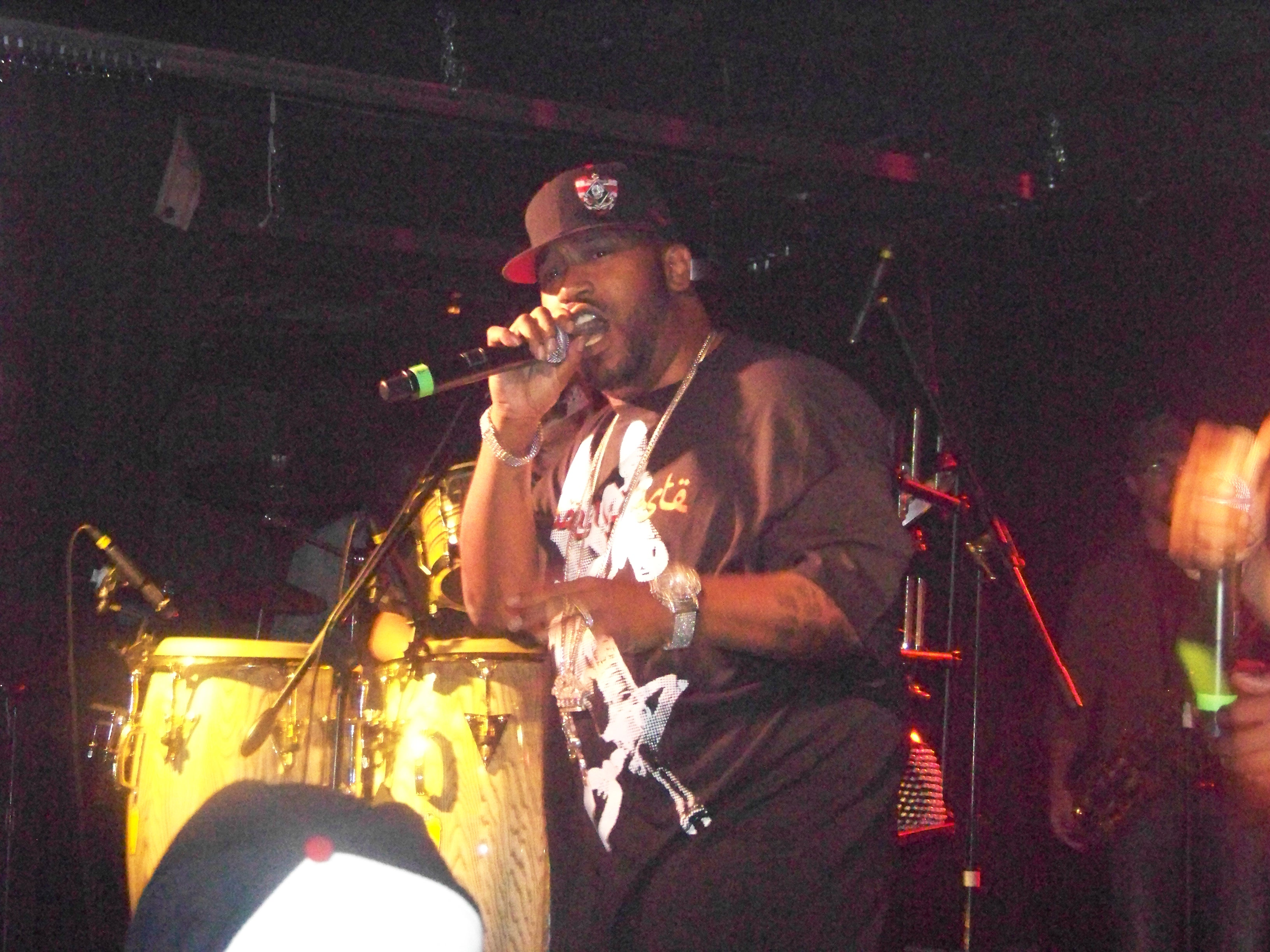
- Performing live in August 2007.
- Studio albums: 5
- Extended plays: 1
- Singles: 11
- Mixtapes: 7
- Featured singles: 20
- Guest appearances: 91

The discography of Bun B, an American rapper, and one half of Southern hip hop group UGK, along with the late Pimp C.

== Albums ==
=== Studio albums ===
List of studio albums, with selected chart positions and certifications
Title	Album details	Peak chart positions				Certifications
Title	Album details	US	US R&B	US Rap	US Ind	Certifications
Trill	Released: October 18, 2005; Label: Rap-A-Lot, Asylum; Format: CD, digital download	6	1	1	—	RIAA: Gold
II Trill	Released: May 20, 2008; Label: Rap-A-Lot, Asylum; Format: CD, digital download	2	1	1	1	
Trill OG	Released: August 3, 2010; Label: II Trill, Rap-A-Lot, Fontana; Format: CD, digital download	4	2	2	—	
Trill OG: The Epilogue	Released: November 11, 2013; Label: II Trill, Rap-A-Lot, RED; Format: CD, digital download	30	6	3	2	
Return of the Trill	Released: August 31, 2018; Label: II Trill, Double Dose, Empire; Format: CD, digital download	150	—	—	9	
"—" denotes a recording that did not chart or was not released in that territory.

=== Collaborative albums ===
Title	Album details
TrillStatik (with Statik Selektah)	Released: April 20, 2019; Label: II Trill, Showoff, Empire; Format: LP, digital download
Mo Trill (with Cory Mo)	Released: March 11, 2022; Label: II Trill, Double Dose, C-Mozart Muzik; Format: Digital download
TrillStatik 2 (with Statik Selektah)	Released: December 8, 2022; Label: Showoff; Format: LP, digital download
TrillStatik 3 (with Statik Selektah)	Released: December 22, 2023; Label: Showoff; Format: LP, digital download
TrillStatik 4 (with Statik Selektah)	Released: December 6, 2024; Label: Showoff; Format: LP, digital download
Way Mo Trill (with Cory Mo)	Released: November 7, 2025; Label: II Trill, C-Mozart Muzik, Hitmaker; Format: Digital download
TrillStatik 5 (with Statik Selektah)	Released: December 10, 2025; Label: Showoff; Format: LP, digital download

== Extended plays ==
Title	EP details
Bun B Day	Released: August 30, 2019; Label: II Trill, Double Dose, Empire; Format: Digital download, streaming
Distant (with Le$)	Released: January 1, 2021; Label: II Trill, DIOS; Format: Digital download, streaming
Yokozuna Trill	Released: April 26, 2024; Label: II Trill, 2Tight Music Japan; Format: Digital download, streaming

== Mixtapes ==
Title	Mixtape details
King of the Trill	Released: 2005; Label: Self-released; Format: Digital download
Legends (with Mddl Fngz)	Released: 2005; Label: Self-released; Format: Digital download
Whut It Dew (Vol. 2) (with Rapid Ric and Killa Kyleon)	Released: 2005; Label: Self-released; Format: Digital download
Gangsta Grillz: The Legends Series (Vol. 1) (with DJ Drama and Mddl Fngz)	Released: 2006; Label: Self-released; Format: Digital download
Texas Legends (with K-Sam)	Released: 2006; Label: Self-released; Format: Digital download
Bun House (with DJ Rell)	Released: 2008; Label: Self-released; Format: Digital download
No Mixtape	Released: 2010; Label: Self-released; Format: Digital download

== Singles ==
=== As lead artist ===
List of singles as lead artist, with selected chart positions, showing year released and album name
Title	Year	Peak chart positions			Album
Title	Year	US Bub.	US R&B	US Rap	Album
"Draped Up" (featuring Lil' Keke)	2005	—	79	—	Trill
"Git It"^{[A]} (featuring Ying Yang Twins)	2006	1	109	22	Trill
"Get Throwed" (featuring Jay-Z, Pimp C, Z-Ro and Young Jeezy)	2006	—	49	24	Trill
"That's Gangsta"^{[B]} (featuring Sean Kingston)	2008	22	45	16	II Trill
"You're Everything" (featuring Rick Ross, David Banner and 8Ball & MJG)	2008	—	59	—	II Trill
"Countin' Money" (featuring Yo Gotti and Gucci Mane)	2010	—	—	—	Trill OG
"Trillionaire" (featuring T-Pain)	2010	—	77	—	Trill OG
"Just Like That" (featuring Young Jeezy and Diamond)	2010	—	—	—	Trill OG
"Ridin' Slow" (featuring Slim Thug and Play-N-Skillz)	2010	—	—	—	Trill OG
"Put It Down" (featuring Drake)	2010	—	81	—	Trill OG
"Fire" (featuring Rick Ross, 2 Chainz and Serani)	2013	—	—	—	Trill OG: The Epilogue
"—" denotes a recording that did not chart or was not released in that territory.

=== As featured artist ===
List of singles as featured artist, with selected chart positions, showing year released and album name
Title	Year	Peak chart positions			Album
Title	Year	US	US R&B	US Rap	Album
"Rep Yo City" (E-40 featuring Petey Pablo, Bun B, 8 Ball and Lil Jon & The East Side Boyz)	2002	—	73	—	Grit & Grind
"Grippin' tha Grain" (Bone Crusher featuring Bun B and Lil' Flip)	2003	—	109	—	AttenCHUN!
"I'sa Playa" (Pimp C featuring Bun B, Twista and Z-Ro)	2005	—	105	—	Sweet James Jones Stories
"3 Kings" (Slim Thug featuring T.I. and Bun B)	2005	—	78	—	Already Platinum
"I Ain't Heard of That" (Slim Thug featuring Pharrell and Bun B)	2005	—	101	—	Already Platinum
"They Don't Know" (Paul Wall featuring Mike Jones and Bun B)	2005	—	71	—	The Peoples Champ
"Give Me That" (Webbie featuring Bun B)	2005	29	8	4	Savage Life
"Gangsta Party" (Yo Gotti featuring 8Ball and Bun B)	2005	—	80	—	Back 2 da Basics
"What You Gonna Do" (Natalie featuring Bun B)	2006	—	—	—	Everything New
"Sister" (The Scoundrels featuring Bun B)	2006	—	—	—	4-Ever Gullie
"Pourin' Up" (Pimp C featuring Mike Jones and Bun B)	2006	—	103	—	Pimpalation
"Can't Stop the Reign 2006" (DJ Kayslay featuring Shaq, Papoose and Bun B)	2006	—	106	—	The Champions: North Meets South
"My 64" (Mike Jones featuring Snoop Dogg and Bun B)	2007	101	53	22	The American Dream
"Love for Money" (Willie the Kid featuring Trey Songz, Gucci Mane, La the Darkman, Bun B, Flo Rida, Yung Joc)	2008	—	—	—	Absolute Greatness
"My Swagg" (Lil Issue featuring Bun B)	2009	—	—	—	Non-album single
"24's" (RichGirl featuring Bun B)	2009	—	65	—	RichGirl
"I'll Do It 2 Ya" (E Smith featuring Bun B)	2009	—	—	—	Non-album single
"City Lights" (Method Man & Redman featuring Bun B)	2009	—	—	—	Blackout! 2
"Trouble" (Ginuwine featuring Bun B)	2009	—	63	—	A Man's Thoughts
"Do You Wanna Ride" (J Kapone featuring Bun B and Ray J)	2009	—	—	—	Hustle Hard
"Can't Crush My Cool" (Juice featuring Bun B)	2010	—	—	—	American Me
"Ride Til I Die" (Young Tyson featuring Bun B)	2010	—	—	—	Non-album singles
"Good Weather Music" (T-Hud featuring Pimp C, Bun B and Static Major)	2010	—	—	—	Non-album singles
"Strangers (Paranoid)" (Talib Kweli and Hi-Tek featuring Bun B)	2010	—	—	—	Revolutions per Minute
"Oil Money" (Freddie Gibbs featuring Chuck Inglish, Chip tha Ripper, Bun B and Dan Auerbach)	2010	—	—	—	Str8 Killa
"Clokin' Lotsa Dollaz" (GLC featuring Bun B and Sir Mix-a-Lot)	2010	—	—	—	Love, Life & Loyalty
"Been About Bread" (Big Boss E featuring Slim Thug and Bun B)	2010	—	—	—	Non-album single
"What Up" (Pimp C featuring Drake and Bun B)	2010	—	—	—	The Naked Soul of Sweet Jones
"Race Against Time" (Statik Selektah and Termanology featuring Bun B and Josh Xantus)	2011	—	—	—	Non-album single
"100 MPH" (Outlawz featuring Bun B and Lloyd)	2011	—	—	—	Perfect Timing (Outlawz album)
"Country Shit" (Remix) (Big K.R.I.T. featuring Ludacris and Bun B)	2011	—	50	23	Return of 4Eva
"On the Corner" (Smoke DZA featuring Bun B and Big K.R.I.T.)	2011	—	—	—	Rolling Stoned
"Pour it Up" (Kidz in the Hall featuring David Banner and Bun B)	2011	—	—	—	Occasion
"Parked Outside" (Jackie Chain featuring Bun B and Big K.R.I.T.)	2011	—	—	—	Non-album single
"Money Is My Wife" (Urban Mystic featuring Bun B, Jadakiss and Styles P)	2011	—	—	—	Love Intervention
"Big Beast" (Killer Mike featuring Bun B, T.I. and Trouble)	2012	—	—	—	R.A.P. Music
"I'm Comin' Down" (Yung Texxus and Tek Neek featuring Bun B)	2012	—	—	—	Non-album single
"Problems" (Marcus Manchild featuring Bun B)	2012	—	—	—	Space Jamz 2
"Happy Days" (Statik Selektah and Termanology featuring Mac Miller, Bun B and Shawn Stockman)	2012	—	—	—	2012
"Boom Shakalaka" (Chip tha Ripper featuring Bun B)	2012	—	—	—	Tell Ya Friends
"I'm from Texas" (Trae Tha Truth featuring Paul Wall, Z-Ro, Slim Thug, Bun B and Kirko Bangz)	2012	—	—	—	The Blackprint
"Cassette Deck" (DJ Scream featuring Rick Ross, Slim Thug and Bun B)	2012	—	—	—	Long Live the Hustle
"Wedding Shells" (Adil Omar featuring Bun B)	2016	—	—	—	Margalla King
"Texas Cups Cali Blunts" (King Lil G featuring Bun B)	2016	—	—	—	Lost in Smoke 2
"Savage Habits" (Little Shalimar featuring Bun B, Killer Mike, Cuz Lightyear)	2016	—	—	—	Rubble Kings Soundtrack
"Captive of the Sun" (Parquet Courts featuring Bun B)	2017	—	—	—	Human Performance
"—" denotes a recording that did not chart or was not released in that territory.

=== Promotional singles ===
List of promotional singles, with selected chart positions, showing year released and album name
Title	Year	Peak chart positions		Album
Title	Year	US	US R&B	Album
"Check on It" (Remix) (Beyoncé featuring Slim Thug and Bun B)	2006	1	3	Non-album single
"Draped Up" (Remix) (featuring Lil' Keke, Slim Thug, Chamillionaire, Paul Wall, Mike Jones, Aztek, Lil' Flip and Z-Ro)	2007	—	45	Trill
"Down in tha Dirty"^{[C]} (Ludacris featuring Bun B and Rick Ross)	2007	—	110	Strength in Numbers
"Get Silly" (Remix) (V.I.C. featuring Soulja Boy Tell 'Em, Bun B, E-40, Unk, Polow da Don, and Jermaine Dupri)	2008	—	—	Beast
"Show Me Somethin'" (Mýa featuring Bun B)	2009	—	—	Beauty & the Streets Vol. 1
"I Look Good" (Remix) (Chalie Boy featuring Slim Thug, Juvenile and Bun B)	2009	—	110	Non-album singles
"Tangerine" (Gentlemen's Club Remix) (Big Boi featuring Rick Ross, Fabolous and Bun B)	2010	—	—	Non-album singles
"What Yo Name Iz?" (Remix) (Kirko Bangz featuring Wale, Big Sean and Bun B)	2011	—	—	Non-album singles
"I'm On 2.0" (Trae Tha Truth featuring Mark Morrison, Big K.R.I.T., Jadakiss, Kendrick Lamar, B.o.B, Tyga, Gudda Gudda and Bun B)	2011	—	—	Tha Blackprint
"Ari Gold" (Remix) (The Niceguys featuring Bun B)	2011	—	—	Non-album single
"—" denotes a recording that did not chart or was not released in that territory.

== Other charted songs ==
List of songs, with selected chart positions, showing year released and album name
Title	Year	Peak chart positions		Album
Title	Year	US	US Rap	Album
"Trap or Die" (Young Jeezy featuring Bun B)	2005	—	77	Let's Get It: Thug Motivation 101
"Hold U Down" (featuring Trey Songz, Mike Jones and Birdman)	2006	—	106	Trill
"Pop It 4 Pimp" (featuring Juvenile and Webbie)	2008	—	115	II Trill
"Damn I'm Cold" (featuring Lil Wayne)	2008	—	86	II Trill
"Outro" (Lil Wayne featuring Bun B, Nas, Shyne and Busta Rhymes)	2011	103	—	Tha Carter IV
"—" denotes a recording that did not chart or was not released in that territory.

== Guest appearances ==
List of non-single guest appearances, with other performing artists, showing year released and album name
Title	Year	Other artist(s)	Album
"7 Executioners"	1993	Born 2wice	U Have The Right 2 Remain Violent
"Bag of Indo"	1994	PxMxWx, Mannie Fresh	High Life
"Life Has No Meaning"	1995	Kilo G	The Bloody City
"Rollin' Thru Ya Hoody"	1995	Cōz	King Of Kali
"Retaliation"	1997	Juvenile, B.G., Ms. Tee	Chopper City & It's All On U
"I'm Com'n"	1997	Hot Boys	Get It How U Live!
"Bout 2 Go Down"	1997	CC Waterbound	Critical Condition
"I-10"	1998	R.W.O. (AKA The ORG.)	Been So Long
"Blowin' Treez"	1998	Ace Deuce	1 Luv
" Ballin'"	1998	Big Tymers	How You Luv That & How You Luv That Vol. 2
"Playboy (Don't Hate Me)"	1998	Big Tymers, Lil Wayne	How You Luv That & How You Luv That Vol. 2
"As the World Turns"	2000	50 Cent	Power of the Dollar & Guess Who's Back?
"If It Was Meant To Be"	2000	C-Note Godfather	Third Coast Born 2000
"Here They Come"	2000	Botany Boyz	Forever Botany
"Mr. Playa"	2000	Point Blank, Icelord, Levi Rasta	Bad Newz Travels Fast
"Cocaine II"	2000	MDDL FNGZ	Trouble
"No Love"	2000	MDDL FNGZ	Trouble
"Holla If U Want It"	2000	Stony Deville	Ackin' Badd
"5 O'Clock In Da Mornin"	2001	MDDL FNGZ, Devin The Dude	Live! From Da Manjah
"Hold It Down"	2001	MDDL FNGZ	Live! From Da Manjah
"No Smiles"	2001	MDDL FNGZ	Live! From Da Manjah
"Look Into Our Eyes"	2001	D-Gotti, Noke D, Dirty $	Da Wreckshop Family: Ack'n A Azz
"Thug It Up"	2001	E.S.G., Slim Thug	Boss Hogg Outlaws
"Diamonds"	2002	Lil Jon and the East Side Boyz, MJG	Put Yo Hood Up
"Chicken Fried Steak"	2002	Tow Down, Slim Thug, Big Hawk	Chicken Fried Steak
"Dreams"	2002	Tela, The Game	Double Dose
"Re-Akshon" (Remix)	2003	Killer Mike, T.I., Bone Crusher	Monster
"Bitch Nigga"	2003	Scarface, Dirt Bomb, Z-Ro	Balls and My Word
"Gots to Go"	2003	David Banner, Devin the Dude	MTA2: Baptized in Dirty Water
"Beware"	2003	Trae, Z-Ro	Losing Composure
"Bezzle"	2003	T.I., 8Ball & MJG	Trap Muzik
"Southern Boy"	2003	Big Tymers, Lil Wayne	Big Money Heavyweight
"What It Do"	2003	Yukmouth, E-Rock	Godzilla
"Dat's What Dat Is"	2004	Paul Wall, Killer Mike, Big Hawk	Chick Magnet
"Drama"	2004	DJ Kay Slay, Lil Jon, David Banner, Baby D	The Streetsweeper, Vol. 2
"Steppin On Toes"	2004	O.G. Style, K-Rino, P.Dot	Return Of Da Game
"Game Over (Flip)" (Remix)	2004	Lil' Flip, Young Buck	none
"I Love Dro"	2004	Yukmouth, Nate	United Ghettos of America Vol. 2
"The Streets"	2004	8Ball & MJG	Living Legends
"Don't Fake"	2004	Trae Tha Truth, Devin the Dude	Same Thing Different Day
"In My Cadillac"	2004	E.S.G., Slim Thug	All American Gangsta
"Dirty"	2004	Pitbull	M.I.A.M.I.
"End of the Road"	2004	Jim Jones, T.I.	On My Way to Church
"Grand Finale"	2004	Lil Jon & the East Side Boyz, Jadakiss, Nas, T.I., Ice Cube	Crunk Juice
"We Do"	2004	Chingy	Powerballin'
"Know What I'm Saying"	2005	Mike Jones, Lil Keke	Who Is Mike Jones?
"Where The Stuff At "	2005	Capone, C-Murder	Pain, Time & Glory
"Big Ballin'"	2005	Outlawz, Stormey	Outlaw 4 Life: 2005 A.P.
"Black Tee"	2005	Gucci Mane, Lil Scrappy, Young Jeezy, Killer Mike, Jody Breeze	Trap House
"Ghetto Life"	2005	Birdman, Six Shot	Fast Money
"I Ain't Heard of That" (Remix)	2005	Slim Thug, Pharrell	Already Platinum
"Trap or Die"	2005	Young Jeezy	Let's Get It: Thug Motivation 101
"23 Hr. Lock Down"	2005	Ying Yang Twins	U.S.A. (United State of Atlanta)
"Purple Rain"	2005	Beanie Sigel	The B. Coming
"They Don't Know" (Remix)	2005	Paul Wall, Lil Keke, Slim Thug, Big Hawk, Trae	none
"Thug in the Club"	2005	Young Buck, Smoov Jizzel	T.I.P.
"Purse First"	2005	Young Buck, Firstborn	T.I.P.
"Take Your"	2005	David Banner, Too Short, Jazze Pha	Certified
"Trill"	2005	Paul Wall, B.G.	The Peoples Champ
"We Don't Give a Fuck"	2005	Lil' Kim, Twista	The Naked Truth
"No Snitchin In'"	2005	Chamillionaire	The Sound of Revenge
"Picture Perfect"	2005	Chamillionaire	The Sound of Revenge
"Sister"	2005	Scoundrels	4-Ever Gullie
"My Music"	2006	Dem Franchize Boyz	On Top of Our Game
"Don't Be a Bitch"	2006	Busta Rhymes	The Crown
"Uptown Bounce"	2006	Labba	The Crown
"Rock Like That"	2006	Juvenile	Reality Check
"Rock Bottom"	2006	Pitbull, Cubo	El Mariel
"Goldmouf" (Remix)	2006	Ghetto Life, Juvenile	The Untold Truth
"Platinum Starz"	2006	Scarface, Lil' Flip, Chamillionaire	My Homies Part 2
"What It Do"	2006	Scarface, Yukmouth, E-Rock	My Homies Part 2
"Hey Ma!"	2006	Do or Die	Get That Paper
"Ride Wit Us"	2006	E.S.G., Chamillionaire	Screwed Up Movement
"She Say She Loves Me"	2006	E-40, 8Ball	none
"Push It" (Remix)	2006	Rick Ross, Jadakiss, Styles P, Game	none
"Gangsta Shit"	2006	DJ Khaled, Young Jeezy, Slick Pulla, Blood Raw	Listennn... the Album
"So Gangsta"	2006	Trae Tha Truth	Restless
"Rock 4 Rock"	2006	Pimp C, Scarface, Willie D	Pimpalation
"Tear the Club Up"	2006	LeToya Luckett, Jazze Pha	LeToya
"I'm Real"	2006	8Ball & MJG, Slim Thug	Tennessee Pimpin
"16 Hoes"	2006	Too Short, Jazze Pha	Blow the Whistle
"Murda Murda"	2006	Lil Scrappy	Expect the Unexpected
"Remember Me"	2006	Z-Ro, P.O.P.	I'm Still Livin'
"It's Okay (One Blood)" (Remix)	2006	The Game, Jim Jones, Snoop Dogg, Nas, T.I., Fat Joe, Lil Wayne, N.O.R.E., Jadakiss, Styles P, Fabolous, Juelz Santana, Rick Ross, Twista, Kurupt, Daz Dillinger, WC, E-40, Chamillionaire, Slim Thug, Young Dro, Clipse, Ja Rule	Doctor's Advocate
"Lil' Girl Gone"	2007	Devin the Dude, Lil Wayne	Waitin' to Inhale
"Say to My Face"	2007	Young Buck, 8Ball & MJG	Buck The World
"They Don't Wanna Play"	2007	Mims, Bad Seed	Music Is My Savior
"My 6-4"	2007	Game, Snoop Dogg	You Know What It Is Vol. 4 Murda Game
"Go Getta" (Remix)	2007	Young Jeezy, R. Kelly, Jadakiss	Young Jeezy Presents USDA: Cold Summer
"Hit Em Up"	2007	DJ Khaled, Paul Wall	We the Best
"Fly Boy"	2007	Planet Asia	Jewelry Box Sessions: The Album
"I See Ya"	2007	Grafh	Autografh
"I Told Ya"	2007	Ali & Gipp, Cee-Lo Green	Kinfolk
"I'm a G"	2007	Yung Joc, Young Dro	Hustlenomics
"Pimp Mode"	2007	Chamillionaire	Ultimate Victory
"Wont Let You Down" (Remix)	2007	Chamillionaire, Slim Thug, Lil Keke, Mike Jones, Trae, Paul Wall, Pimp C, Z-Ro	none
"Jaw Jackin'"	2008	V.I.C.	Beast
"Final Warning"	2008	DJ Khaled, Rock City, Blood Raw, Ace Hood, Brisco, Bali, Lil' Scrappy, Shawty Lo	We Global
"How We Rock"	2008	Termanology	Politics As Usual
"Like Ohh, Like Ohh" (Remix)	2008	Grafh, Jim Jones, Jadakiss, Prinz	The Oracle 2
"The Recipe"	2008	E-40, Gucci Mane	The Ball Street Journal
"Forgot About Me"	2008	Scarface, Lil Wayne	Emeritus
"I Am The Man"	2008	B.o.B, OJ da Juiceman	B.o.B vs Bobby Ray
"Thru My Eyez"	2009	X Clan, Tony Henry	Mainstream Outlawz
"Salute"	2009	Juice	Position of Power
"Welcome to Houston"	2009	Slim Thug, Chamillionaire, Mike Jones, Paul Wall, Yung Redd, Lil' Keke, Z-Ro, Mike D, Big Pokey, Rob G, Trae, Lil' O, Pimp C	Boss of All Bosses
"Cook Up"	2009	Currensy, Dee Low	This Ain't No Mixtape
"Pimpin' Ain't Easy"	2009	DJ Drama, La the Darkman, Styles P, Jovan Dais	Gangsta Grillz: The Album (Vol. 2)
"City Lights"	2009	Method Man & Redman	Blackout! 2
"Gangsta Shit"	2009	Soul Assassins, M1	Soul Assassins: Intermission
"Better Believe It" (Remix)	2009	Lil Boosie, Trae, Yo Gotti, Foxx	none
"Choose Your Side"	2009	La Coka Nostra	A Brand You Can Trust
"Niggaz Down South" (Remix)	2009	Killer Mike, T.I.	Underground Atlanta
"Used to Matter"	2009	Raekwon	Only Built 4 Cuban Linx… Pt. II
"Uptown"	2009	Drake, Lil Wayne	So Far Gone - EP
"Meet the Legends"	2009	Tommy Tee, Supa Sayed	Studio Time
"One Mo' Gin"	2009	Play-N-Skillz, Krayzie Bone, Lil Jon	Recession Proof
"Break It Down"	2009	Triple C's	Custom Cars & Cycles
"Mirror's Edge"	2009	Mike Posner, GLC, XV	One Foot Out the Door
"911"	2009	Shawty Lo, Lyfe Jennings, Rick Ross	Fright Night
"Mo Milly"	2009	Birdman, Drake	Priceless
"Kush Is My Cologne"	2009	Gucci Mane, Devin the Dude, E-40	The State vs. Radric Davis
"Like Me"	2009	Lloyd	Like Me: The Young Goldie EP
"Where the Hoes At"	2010	OJ Da Juiceman,	O.R.A.N.G.E.
"Layed Out"	2010	DJ Kay Slay, Twista, Papoose, Dorrough, Young Chris, Jay Rock	More Than Just a DJ
"Hustle Game"	2010	DJ Kay Slay, Webbie, Lil Boosie, Nicole Wray	More Than Just a DJ
"Heard of Us" (Remix)	2010	DJ Kay Slay, Jadakiss, Sheek Louch, Styles P, Papoose, Lloyd Banks, Tony Yayo, Ray J	More Than Just a DJ
"Sho' Nuff"	2010	Freeway, Jake One	The Stimulus Package
"Rockin' All My Chains On"	2010	DJ Khaled, Birdman, Soulja Boy	Victory
"Laid the Fuck Out"	2010	Papoose, Twista	Papoose Season
"I Don't Give It Fuck"	2010	8Ball & MJG	Ten Toes Down
"Bad Habits"	2010	French Montana	Mac & Cheese 2
"My Tool"	2010	Young Jeezy, Birdman	Trap or Die (Part 2): By Any Means Necessary
"Trap or Die 2"	2010	Young Jeezy	Trap or Die (Part 2): By Any Means Necessary
"Miss Me" (OG Mix)	2010	Drake	none
"Bring the Goons Out" (Remix)	2010	Grafh, Jim Jones, Red Café, Maino, Cassidy	From the Bottom
"Shine Blockas" (Remix)	2010	Big Boi, Gucci Mane, Project Pat	Sir Lucious Left Foot: The Son of Chico Dusty
"All I Do Is Win" (Remix)	2010	Young Cash, Yo Gotti, Gudda Gudda, Ice Berg, 2 Chainz, T-Pain, Field Mob	Fed Bound
"Im'ma Get It"	2010	Paul Wall, Kid Sister	Heart of a Champion
"Rock Bottom"	2010	Freddie Gibbs	Str8 Killa
"Get in My Car"	2010	Usher	Raymond v. Raymond and Versus
"Little Friend"	2010	Gucci Mane	The Appeal: Georgia's Most Wanted
"Dickies"	2010	Pimp C, Young Jeezy	The Naked Soul of Sweet Jones
"Go 2 War"	2010	Pimp C, J-Dawg	The Naked Soul of Sweet Jones
"Get Big" (Remix)	2010	Dorrough, Diddy, Yo Gotti, Diamond, Shawty Lo, Maino, DJ Drama	none
"Money & Sex"	2010	Big Sean	Finally Famous Vol. 3: Big
"Good to Go"	2010	Yelawolf	Trunk Muzik 0-60
"Pronto" (G-Mix)	2010	Snoop Dogg, Soulja Boy	More Malice
"Lite 1 Witcha Boi"	2010	Redman, Method Man	Reggie
"Certified D-Boy"	2011	La the Darkman	Embassy Invasion
"Favorite DJ" (Remix)	2011	Game, Clinton Sparks, Jim Jones	Purp & Patron
"Pimps"	2011	2 Chainz, Big K.R.I.T.	Codeine Cowboys (A 2 Chainz Collection)
"Raw Shit"	2011	Travis Barker, Tech N9ne	Give the Drummer Some
"Just Chill"	2011	Travis Barker, Beanie Sigel, Kobe	Give the Drummer Some
"That Candy Paint"	2011	E-40, Slim Thug	Revenue Retrievin': Graveyard Shift
"Across the Map"	2011	DJ Quick, Bizzy Bone	The Book of David
"Full Time Grind"	2011	Monta Ellis, Redboi	none
"Weight of the World"	2011	Grafh	Classic's
"Say It" (Remix)	2011	Termanology, Joell Ortiz, Saigon, Freeway	Cameo King II
"Happiness Before Riches"	2011	GLC, BJ the Chicago Kid	Fellow of the Ism
"Show It on Ya Face"	2011	Kevin Pistol, Young J.R.	none
"Devoted"	2011	Masspike Miles	The Road Less Traveled EP
"Feel Me"	2011	Smif-n-Wessun, Pete Rock, Rock	Monumental
"Grippin on the Wood"	2011	Pimp C, Big K.R.I.T.	Still Pimping
"What U Workin Wit"	2011	Pimp C, Slim Thug	Still Pimping
"Hold Up"	2011	Pimp C, Paul Wall	Still Pimping
"Gorillaz"	2011	Pimp C, Da Underdawgz	Still Pimping
"Never Fuck Without a Rubber"	2011	Webbie, Lil Phat	Savage Stories
"Outro"	2011	Lil Wayne, Nas, Shyne, Busta Rhymes	Tha Carter IV
"Bodies Hit the Floor"	2011	Killa Kyleon	Candy Paint 'N' Texas Plates 2
"ZRo & Bun"	2011	Z-Ro	Meth
"Never a Dull Moment"	2011	Statik Selektah, Action Bronson, Termanology	Population Control
"Rocket Man"	2011	Mike Posner	The Layover
"5 on the Kush"	2011	B.o.B, Big K.R.I.T.	E.P.I.C. (Every Play Is Crucial)
"On the Corner"	2011	Jet Life, Smoke DZA, Big K.R.I.T.	Jet World Order
"Mothership"	2011	Les	Settle 4 Les Vol. 2
"Bus Stallions"	2011	Dre Day, Killa Kyleon	My Theme Music
"Say I Won't" (Remix)	2011	Chamillionaire	Dangerous Minds
"Creepin'"	2011	Slim Thug, Paul Wall	Houston
"I'm Real You Fake"	2012	Paul Wall, D-Boss	No Sleep Til Houston
"Cadillacs"	2012	Flatline, Killa Kyleon	Respect My Gangsta
"Purple Swag" (H-Town Allstar Remix)	2012	ASAP Rocky, Paul Wall, Killa Kyleon	Live Love Purple
"Never Understand"	2012	Trouble	431 Days
"Allergic"	2012	8Ball, Killer Mike	Premro
"Smoked Out"	2012	David Banner, Raheem DeVaughn	Sex, Drugs & Video Games
"Go Time"	2012	Jon MCXRO	The Fifth Of Never
"Make It Snow"	2012	Tony Yayo, Slim Thug, Mr. Porter	Sex, Drugs, & Hip-Hop
"City of Lights"	2012	Celeb Forever	Make Believers
"Bad Habits"	2012	Fat Tony, Nick Diamonds	Double Dragons
"Pull Up"	2012	Big K.R.I.T., Big Sant	Live from the Underground
"Candy Paint & Gold Teeth"	2012	Waka Flocka Flame, Ludacris	Triple F Life: Fans, Friends & Family
"Black on Black"	2012	Maybach Music Group, Gunplay, Ace Hood	Self Made Vol. 2
"Trappin' in My Sleep"	2012	Blue DaVinci, Calico Jonez, Pusha T	Tha Davinci Code
"R.I.P."	2012	Childish Gambino	Royalty
"Need a Knot"	2012	Brother Ali	Mourning in America and Dreaming in Color
"Yo Trill Shit"	2012	Styles P	The Diamond Life Project
"Busta Ass Niggas"	2012	Hit-Boy, King Chip	HITstory
"Big Homie"	2012	Big Zak	Talk That Shit
"Hometown Hero"	2012	D-Pryde	Flagship
"Lights Shows"	2012	Privaledge	Joe World
"Xross Your Heart"	2012	Chino XL	Ricanstruction: The Black Rosary
"Wait A Minute"	2012	Chris Webby, Kid Ink	Bars On Me
"What I Do"	2012	MGK, Dubo	Lace Up
"Hustler's Ringtone"	2012	Termanology, Lil' Fame	Fizzyology
"Yo Bitch Choose Me"	2012	Cory Mo, GLC	Country Rap Tunes 2
"Club God 2"	2012	Beat King, Kirko Bangz, Slim Thug	They Want Some
"Street Lottery"	2013	Young Scooter	Street Lottery
"Gotta Stay"	2013	Mayalino, Max Minelli	Bird Day
"You Know I'm Fresh"	2013	Short Dawg	Southern Flame Spitta 5
"Kush Ups"	2013	Project Pat, Nasty Mane	Cheez N Dope
"Violent Music" (Remix)	2013	DJ Kay Slay, DJ Paul, Busta Rhymes, Vado, Gunplay	Grown Man Hip Hop Part 2 (Sleepin' With The Enemy)
"Time Travel" (Remix)	2013	Dead Prez, Reek da Villian	Information Age
"Snakeskin Down"	2013	La the Darkman, Styles P	Diary of A Playboy 2
"Shine On"	2013	Big K.R.I.T.	King Remembered in Time
"Ask Me Why"	2013	Torae	Admission of Guilt
"Cadillac"	2013	Mayalino, Mannie Fresh	none
"Girls With The Dirty Souths"	2013	ItsTheReal	Urbane Outfitters Vol. 1
"I Been On" (Remix)	2013	Beyoncé, Z-Ro, Scarface, Willie D, Slim Thug, Lil Keke	none
"Love Me Now"	2013	DeLorean	Grace
"2AM"	2013	Phil Ade	R.O.S.E. (Result Of Society’s Evils)
"H-Town"	2013	Dizzee Rascal, Trae tha Truth	none
"Funeral Season"	2013	Statik Selektah, Styles P, Hit-Boy	Extended Play
"Easy Money"	2013	Wrekonize	The War Within
"Bounce"	2013	Tony Touch, Twista	The Piece Maker 3: Return of the 50 MC's
"Houston Tempo"	2013	Loaded Lux	You Gon Get This Work
"Roads Untraveled" (Rad Omen Remix)	2013	Linkin Park	Recharged
"Bun B speaks"	2013	Lecrae	Church Clothes 2
"Swangin" (Remix)	2013	Stalley, Lil Keke, Trae tha Truth, Chamillionaire, E.S.G.	none
"Let 'Em Hang"	2014	Point Blank, Big Pokey	No Money, No Reason
"Summer In Houston"	2014	Point Blank, Z-Ro, Klondike Kat	No Money, No Reason
"Pinky Ringz"	2014	Scotty ATL, Mookie Jones	Spaghetti Junction
"Mo Better Cool"	2014	Big K.R.I.T., Devin the Dude, Big Sant	Cadillactica
"Meet The Dealer"	2015	Ro Spit	IV Life...
"The IllEST the RealEST the TrillEST"	2015	MGK, Trae the Truth	Fuck It
"Keep On Hustlin"	2015	Warren G, Jeezy, Nate Dogg	Regulate... G Funk Era, Pt. II
"Moses"	2016	Apathy, Twista	Handshakes with Snakes
"Where's the Love?"	2016	Termanology, Bodega Bamz, Masspike Miles	More Politics
"Wedding Shells"	2016	Adil Omar	Margalla King
"Candy Paint"	2017	Kodak Black	Painting Pictures
"Anti-Hero"	2017	Slaine, Termanology, Everlast	Anti-Hero
"Reel Girls"	2018	Flatbush Zombies	Vacation in Hell
"The Recipe"	2018	Sauce Walka	Drip God
"Ayo"	2023	Logic, Lil Keke	College Park
"Burnout"	2025	Bryson Tiller	Solace & The Vices

== Notes ==
- A "Git It" did not enter the Billboard Hot 100, but peaked at number 1 on the Bubbling Under Hot 100 Singles chart, which acts as a 25-song extension to the Hot 100. It did not enter the Hot R&B/Hip-Hop Songs chart, but peaked at number 9 on the Bubbling Under R&B/Hip-Hop Singles chart, which acts as a 25-song extension to the R&B/Hip-Hop Songs chart.
- B "That's Gangsta" did not enter the Billboard Hot 100, but peaked at number 22 on the Bubbling Under Hot 100 Singles chart, which acts as a 25-song extension to the Hot 100.
- C "Down in tha Dirty" did not enter the Hot R&B/Hip-Hop Songs chart, but peaked at number 10 on the Bubbling Under R&B/Hip-Hop Singles chart, which acts as a 25-song extension to the Hot R&B/Hip-Hop Songs chart.
