= Kirko Bangz discography =

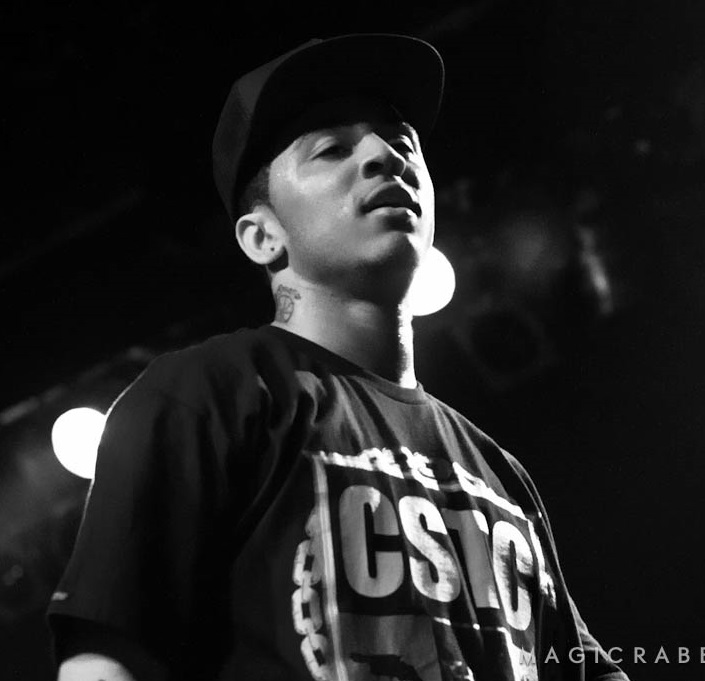
- Extended plays: 2
- Mixtapes: 12
- Singles: 16
- Guest appearances: 32

This is the discography of Kirko Bangz, an American rapper, singer and record producer.

== Extended plays ==
List of extended plays and selected albums details
Title	Album details
Fallin' Up Mix	Released: August 31, 2015; Label: Self-released; Formats: digital download
Playa Made	Released: February 19, 2016; Label: LMG Music Group; Formats: digital download

== Mixtapes ==
List of mixtapes and selected album details
Title	Album details
Procrastination Kills	Released: July 5, 2009; Label: Self-released; Formats: digital download
Progression	Released: October 15, 2009; Label: Self-released; Formats: digital download
Procrastination Kills 2	Released: May 6, 2010; Label: Self-released; Formats: digital download
Procrastination Kills 3	Released: March 1, 2011; Label: Self-released; Formats: digital download
Progression 2: A Young Texas Playa	Released: January 19, 2012; Label: Self-released; Formats: digital download
Procrastination Kills 4	Released: September 4, 2012; Label: Self-released; Formats: digital download
Progression III	Released: August 12, 2013; Label: Self-released; Formats: digital download
Progression 4	Released: March 28, 2014; Label: Self-released; Formats: digital download
Progression V: Young Texas Playa	Released: December 16, 2014; Label: Self-released; Formats: digital download
Back Flossin	Released: August 26, 2016; Label: LMG Music Group, 300 Entertainment; Formats: digital download
Progression 17	Released: August 10, 2017; Label: Self-released; Formats: digital download
Now That U Here	Released: February 15, 2021; Label: Always Progressing Records; Formats: digital download

== Singles ==
=== As lead artist ===
List of singles, with selected chart positions, showing year released and album name
Title	Year	Peak chart positions			Certifications	Album
Title	Year	US	US R&B/HH	US Rap	Certifications	Album
"What Yo Name Iz?"	2011	—	41	—		Procrastination Kills 3
"Drank in My Cup"	2011	28	5	1	RIAA: Platinum	Progression 2: A Young Texas Playa
"Keep It Trill"	2012	—	49	—		Non-album single
"That Pole"	2013	—	—	—		Procrastination Kills 4
"Hoe" (featuring YG and Yo Gotti)	2014	—	110	—		Non-album singles
"Rich" (featuring August Alsina)	2014	— (Note: "Rich" did not enter the Billboard Hot 100, but peaked at number 5 on the Bubbling Under Hot 100 Singles chart.)	37	—		Non-album singles
"Worry Bout It" (featuring Fetty Wap)	2015	—	—	—		Fallin' Up Mix
"I Just Got Paid" (featuring E-40 and TK Kravitz)	2016	—	—	—		Non-album singles
"Swang n Bang"	2017	—	—	—		Non-album singles
"Date Night (Same Time)" (featuring Chris Brown)	2018	—	—	—		Non-album singles
"Work Sumn" (featuring Tory Lanez and Jacquees)	2018	—	—	—		Non-album singles
"Like Whoa"	2019	—	—	—		Non-album singles
"—" denotes a recording that did not chart.

=== As featured artist ===
List of singles, with selected chart positions, showing year released and album name
Title	Year	Peak chart positions			Album
Title	Year	US	US R&B	US Rap	Album
"Burn It Up" (Miss Mykie featuring Paul Wall, Kirko Bangz and Papa Reu)	2010	—	—	—	Non-album single
"I'm from Texas" (Trae Tha Truth featuring Paul Wall, Z-Ro, Slim Thug, Bun B and Kirko Bangz)	2012	—	—	—	The Blackprint
"Young & Gettin' It" (Meek Mill featuring Kirko Bangz)	2012	86	25	18	Dreams & Nightmares
"Honey Love" (Ye Ali featuring Kirko Bangz)	2016	—	—	—	Non-album single
"—" denotes a recording that did not chart.

== Other charted songs ==
List of songs, with selected chart positions and certifications, showing year released and album name
Title	Year	Peak chart positions		Album
Title	Year	US	US Bub. R&B	Album
"Walk On Green" (featuring French Montana)	2012	—	25	Procrastination Kills 4
"—" denotes a recording that did not chart.

== Guest appearances ==
List of non-single guest appearances, with other performing artists, showing year released and album name
Title	Year	Other artist(s)	Album
"My Car"	2011	Slim Thug, Doughbeezy	Houston
"Knowmtalmbout"	2012	Paul Wall	No Sleep Til Houston
"Another Round" (Remix)	2012	Fat Joe, Fabolous, Mary J. Blige, Chris Brown	—N/a
"Take It Down"	2012	Kid Ink	—N/a
"Refill" (Remix)	2012	Elle Varner, T-Pain, Wale	—N/a
"Fuck Around"	2012	Fat Trel	Nightmare on E St.
"Don't Pay 4 It"	2012	DJ Khaled, Wale, Tyga, Mack Maine	Kiss the Ring
"Double Cup"	2012	Ace Hood, Bun B	Body Bag Vol. 2
"Girls & Guitars"	2012	Tyga	Well Done 3
"Out This Bitch"	2012	Tyga	Well Done 3
"Bout It, Bout It"	2012	Freddie Gibbs	Baby Face Killa
"Real Niggas in the Building"	2012	DJ Drama, Travis Porter	Quality Street Music
"Fuck Something"	2012	Gucci Mane, Waka Flocka Flame, Young Scooter	Trap God
"Whenever"	2013	MCGOKU305	TBA
"Molly" (Remix)	2013	Boston George, Meek Mill	—N/a
"Top of the World"	2013	Joe Budden	No Love Lost
"H Town's Finest"	2013	Slim Thug, Paul Wall, Jevarian J	Welcome 2 Texas Vol. 3
"Living to Die" (Remix)	2013	GT Garza, Scooby, Propain, Brian Angel	—N/a
"Slab"	2013	Funkmaster Flex, Z-Ro	Who You Mad At? Me or Yourself?
"The Go Go"	2013	Wyclef Jean	April Showers
"Give It Up"	2013	DJ Scream, Verse Simmonds	The Ratchet Superior
"I'm That"	2013	Alley Boy	War Cry
"Broke Dem Boyz Off"	2013	Dorrough, Trae Tha Truth	Shut the City Down
"1st Night / 4 A Young" (Remix)	2013	Ty Dolla Sign, Trey Songz	Beach House 2
"Still Sippin"	2013	Ty Dolla Sign	Beach House 2
"My City"	2013	Killa Kyleon, Slim Thug	Lean on Me: The Adventures of Joe Clark
"Straight for the Summer"	2013	Vado, Fabolous	Slime Flu 4
"Triller"	2013	Bun B	Trill OG: The Epilogue
"Perception:Love All Around Me"	2013	Rockie Fresh, Casey Veggies	Fresh Veggies
"Coming Dine"	2016	Ingrid, Devin the Dude	Trill Feels
"Addicted"	2017	Slim Thug	Welcome 2 Houston
"Inside"	2019	Ye Ali	Private Suite 2
