= DJ B-Do =

Producer/Songwriter

B-Do
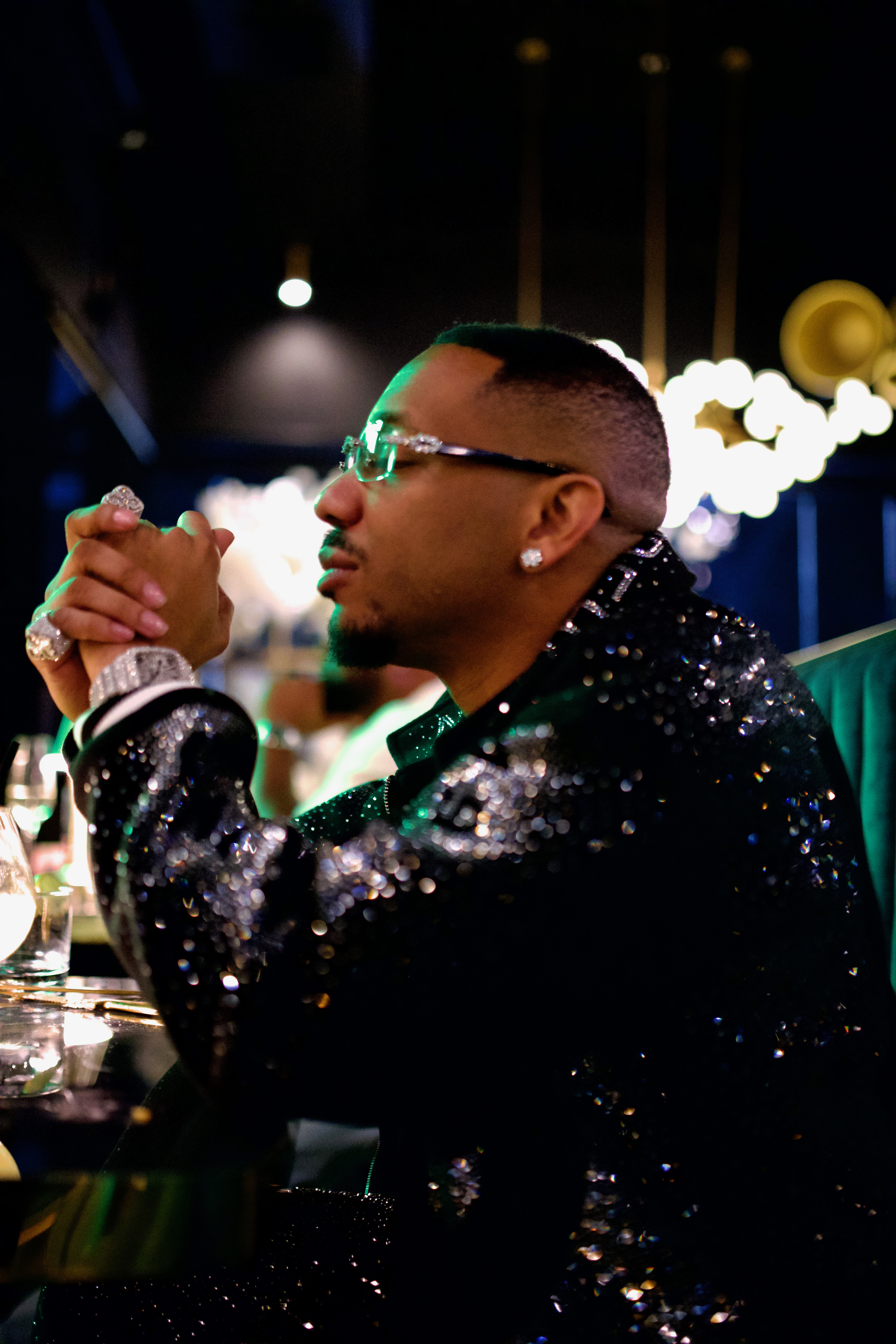
- B-Do in 2025

Background information
- Born: Bradley Davis; July 31, 1984 (age 42); Port Arthur, Texas, U.S.
- Genres: Hip hop
- Occupations: Record Producer; Rapper
- Instruments: Keyboard; sampler
- Years active: 2007–present
- Member of: Da Underdawgz
- Website: Twitter; Instagram

Bradley Davis (born July 31, 1984), professionally known by his stage name DJ B-Do, is an American Record producer affiliated with UGK. He is a member of hip-hop duo Da Underdawgz with fellow rapper Young T.O.E., brought together by the late Pimp C.

== Biography ==
Bradley Davis was born and raised in Port Arthur, Texas. He has played instruments since he was two years old. Being Pimp C's protégé, he made his first appearance as a featured artist and record producer on the song "Grind Hard", which also featured Young T.O.E., from UGK's self-titled studio album Underground Kingz, released in 2007. This led Pimp C to create a duo between Davis and Young T.O.E. called Da Underdawgz. In 2008 Davis was featured in music video for Lupe Fiasco's single "Hip Hop Saved My Life" as the main character. In 2009, Davis produced two tracks, "Purse Come First" and "Used to Be", from UGK's final album UGK 4 Life together with Pimp C, and appeared on E.S.G.'s projects Digital Dope: The Reintroduction and Everyday Street Gangsta. Davis produced Bun B's 2010 single "Countin' Money" from his third solo studio album Trill OG, and appeared on his mentor's first and second posthumous solo releases of The Naked Soul of Sweet Jones and Still Pimping along with his bandmate Young T.O.E. Davis has his production credit on the song "I'm What Dat Iz" from Lil' O's 2011 Grind Hard, Pray Harder album. Da Underdawgz self-released their first street album titled The 1st One Is for Pimp in 2012, which featured contributions from UGK, E.S.G., Chamillionaire, Killa Kyleon, Young Buck and Z-Ro among others.

== Discography ==
- Da Underdawgz – The 1st One Is for Pimp (2012)

=== Guest appearances ===
Title	Year	Other artist(s)	Album
"Grind Hard"	2007	UGK, Young T.O.E.	Underground Kingz
"Ballin Just a Hobby"	2009	E.S.G., Big Cliff	Digital Dope: The Reintroduction
"Believe in Me"	2010	Pimp C, Ivory P., Cory Mo, Hezeleo, BankRoll Jonez, Bub, Da Underdawgz	The Naked Soul of Sweet Jones
"Colors"	2010	Pimp C, Da Underdawgz	The Naked Soul of Sweet Jones
"Bread Up"	2011	Pimp C, Paul Wall	Still Pimping
"Notes on Leases"	2011	Pimp C, Da Underdawgz	Still Pimping
"Gorillaz"	2011	UGK, Da Underdawgz	Still Pimping

=== Production credits ===
Year	Song	Artist	Album	Notes
2007	"Grind Hard"	UGK, DJ B-Do, Young T.O.E.	Underground Kingz	co-produced by Pimp C
2008	"Rock 2 Rock"	Vicious, Wochee	Am I My Brothers Keeper	
2009	"Actin Bad"	E.S.G.	Digital Dope: The Reintroduction	
2009	"Purse Come First"	UGK, Big Gipp	UGK 4 Life	produced w/ Pimp C
2009	"Used to Be"	UGK, 8Ball & MJG, B-Legit, E-40	UGK 4 Life	produced w/ Pimp C
2009	"June 27, 2010"	E.S.G., Big Moe	Everyday Street Gangsta	
2010	"Countin' Money"	Bun B, Yo Gotti, Gucci Mane	Trill O.G	
2010	"What Up?"	UGK, Drake	The Naked Soul of Sweet Jones	produced w/ Boi-1da & Nick Bongers
2010	"Dickies"	UGK, Young Jeezy	The Naked Soul of Sweet Jones	
2010	"Colors"	UGK, Da Underdawgz	The Naked Soul of Sweet Jones	
2011	"Notes on Leases"	Pimp C, Da Underdawgz	Still Pimping	
2011	"Gorillaz"	UGK, Da Underdawgz	Still Pimping	
2011	"I'm What Dat Iz"	Lil' O	Grind Hard, Pray Harder	
2015	"10 Pints"	Young Buck	10 Pints	produced w/ Beat Gladiators
