= Feel Me (Tyga song) =

2017 song by Tyga

Single by Tyga featuring Kanye West

from the album BitchImTheShit2
- Released: January 1, 2017
- Recorded: 2016
- Genre: Hip hop
- Length: 3:20
- Label: GOOD; Interscope
- Songwriters: Michael Stevenson; Kanye West; Raul Gonzalez; Brandon Tillman; Alexander "A.E." Edwards
- Producers: Sound M.O.B.; Kanye West

Tyga singles chronology
"Gucci Snakes" (2016)	"Feel Me" (2017)	"100s" (2017)

Kanye West singles chronology
"Castro" (2016)	"Feel Me" (2017)	"Love Yourself" (2017)

"Feel Me" is a song by American rapper Tyga featuring fellow American rapper and then-common-law relative Kanye West. It was released on New Year's Day, 2017 in a joint venture with West's GOOD Music and Interscope Records as the third single from Tyga's fifth studio album, BitchImTheShit2 (2017). The song was written by both performers, along with Alexander "A.E." Edwards, while production was handled by Sound M.O.B. and West himself. It remains Tyga's only song to be released by GOOD or Interscope.

"Feel Me" entered the Bubbling Under Hot 100 at number four, narrowly entered the Canadian Hot 100, and marked West's first release following his November 2016 hospitalization.

== Music video ==
On September 2020, artist Eli Russell Linnetz shared the previously unreleased music video he directed for the song through his Instagram account, three years later after it was filmed in 2017, ultimately being scrapped after Tyga's breakup with Kylie Jenner. It features both Jenner and her older sister Kim Kardashian, partners of Tyga and Kanye West at the time, respectively.

== Charts ==
Chart (2017)	Peak position
Canada Hot 100 (Billboard)	90
New Zealand Heatseekers (RMNZ)	9
US Bubbling Under Hot 100 (Billboard)	4
US Hot R&B/Hip-Hop Songs (Billboard)	48

== Release history ==
Country	Date	Format	Label	Ref.
United States	January 1, 2017	Digital download	GOOD Music; Interscope Records	
United States	February 21, 2017	Rhythmic radio	GOOD Music; Interscope Records	
