= BitchImTheShit2 =

Bitch I'm the Shit 2

Studio album by Tyga
- Released: July 21, 2017
- Genres: Hip hop; trap
- Length: 53:08
- Labels: Last Kings; EMPIRE
- Producers: Kanye West (also exec.); Crakwav; ghxst; Sound M.O.B.; Zaytoven; Tarentino; Murda Beatz; SP Anonymous; Rex Kudo; Charlie Handsome; Cubeatz

Tyga chronology
Rawwest Nigga Alive (2016)	Bitch I'm the Shit 2 (2017)	Kyoto (2018)

Singles from Bitch I'm the Shit 2
- 1. "Gone Too Far" Released: January 1, 2016; 2. "1 of 1" Released: June 17, 2016; 3. "Feel Me" Released: January 1, 2017; 4. "100's" Released: April 3, 2017; 5. "Eyes Closed" Released: May 4, 2017; 6. "Playboy" Released: June 2, 2017; 7. "Flossin" Released: June 23, 2017; 8. "Move to L.A" Released: July 7, 2017

Bitch I'm the Shit 2 (stylized as BitchImTheShit2) is the fifth studio album by American rapper Tyga. It was released on July 21, 2017, by Last Kings Records and Empire Distribution. It is the sequel to his 2011 mixtape, #BitchImTheShit. The album features guest appearances from Kanye West, Pusha T, Young Thug, Quavo, Chief Keef, Vince Staples, Ty Dolla Sign, A.E., and Honey Cocaine. The album narrowly entered the Billboard 200 and received mixed reviews.

== Singles ==
On January 4, 2016, "Gone Too Far" was released. On June 17, 2016, "1 of 1" was released. On January 1, 2017, "Feel Me" featuring Kanye West was released. On April 4, 2017, "100's" featuring Chief Keef and A.E. was released. On May 5, 2017, "Eyes Closed" was released. On June 2, 2017, "Playboy" featuring Vince Staples was released. On June 23, 2017, "Flossin" featuring his son, King was released. On July 7, 2017, "Move to L.A" featuring Ty Dolla Sign was released along with the pre-order of the album.

== Track listing ==
Bitch I'm the Shit 2
No.	Title	Writer(s)	Producer(s)	Length
1.	"ドウカテイ (Ducati)"			0:18
2.	"Feel Me" (featuring Kanye West)	Michael Stevenson; Kanye West; Raul Gonzalez; Brandon Tillman; Alexander Edward	Sound M.O.B.; Kanye West	3:19
3.	"Teterboro Flow"	Stevenson; Ryan Vojtesak; Masamune Kudo	Rex Kudo; Charlie Handsome	2:44
4.	"Ski on the Slope" (featuring Pusha T)	Stevenson; Terrence Thornton; Joseph Epperson; Alexander Edward	Crakwav	3:30
5.	"Eyes Closed"	Stevenson; Epperson; Edward	Crakwav	4:27
6.	"Move to L.A." (featuring Ty Dolla Sign)	Stevenson; Tyrone Griffin, Jr.; Epperson; Edward	Crakwav	3:42
7.	"Bel Air" (featuring Quavo)	Stevenson; Quavious Marshall; Shand Lindstrom; Epperson; Edward	Murda Beatz; Crakwav	4:28
8.	"Run It Back" (featuring Young Thug)	Stevenson; Jeffery Williams; Epperson; Edward	Crakwav	3:56
9.	"Playboy" (featuring Vince Staples)	Stevenson; Vincent Staples; Epperson; Edward	Crakwav	3:01
10.	"Chandeliers"	Stevenson; Chance Youngblood; Jacques Webster	Tarentino	3:51
11.	"Flossin" (featuring King)	Stevenson; Xavier Dotson	Zaytoven	2:41
12.	"Cash Splash NASA"	Stevenson; Dotson	Zaytoven	3:20
13.	"1 of 1"	Stevenson; Epperson; Edward	Crakwav	3:24
14.	"Gone Too Far"	Stevenson; Epperson; Edward	Crakwav	2:34
15.	"Nann Nigga" (featuring Honey Cocaine)	Stevenson; Sochitta Sal; Juston Freeman	SP Anonymous	3:59
16.	"100's" (featuring Chief Keef and A.E.)	Stevenson; Keith Cozart; Mackenzie Cook; Epperson; Edward	GHXST	3:54
Total length:				53:08

Notes

- "Cash Splash NASA" is not available on streaming services.
- Originally, "Chandeliers" had background vocals by Travis Scott but were removed later that year.

Sample credits

- "Move to L.A." contains a sample of "What You Want" by Mase and Total
- "1 of 1" contains a sample of "Controlla" by Drake and "Sucky Ducky" by Mr. Vegas
- "Nann Nigga" contains a sample of "Nann Nigga" by Trick Daddy and Trina

== Charts ==
Chart (2017)	Peak position
New Zealand Heatseekers Albums (RMNZ)	8
US Billboard 200	139
US Independent Albums (Billboard)	40
