= Blue Notes (Meek Mill song) =

Song by Meek Mill

Song by Meek Mill

from the album DC4
- Released: October 28, 2016
- Genre: hip-hop
- Length: 3:47
- Producer: Butter Beats

"Blue Notes" is a song by American rapper Meek Mill, featuring Snowy White. It is the eighth song on Mill's eleventh mixtape, DC4 (2016) and was released on October 28, 2016. The title is a reference to the 2013 series of $100 bills which features a blue 3-D security strip. The song contains a sample from "Midnight Blues", a song by Snowy White.

== Charts ==
Chart (2016)	Peak position
US Billboard Hot 100	93
US Hot R&B/Hip-Hop Songs (Billboard)	38
