= DC4 (mixtape) =

Mixtape by Meek Mill
- Released: October 27, 2016
- Recorded: 2015–16
- Genre: Hip-hop; trap
- Length: 55:38
- Label: MMG; Dream Chasers; Atlantic
- Producer: Bennie Briggman; Butter Beats (Dolla Bill Kidz); Cubeatz; Honorable C.N.O.T.E.; Infamous Rell; Jahlil Beats; MP808; Papamitrou; Murda Beatz; Nick Verruto; OZ; RaRa; Sonny Digital; Sound M.O.B.; Streetrunner; Tarik Azzouz; Tariq Beats; The Beat Bully; The Mekanics

Meek Mill chronology
4/4 (2016)	DC4 (2016)	Meekend Music (2017)

Singles from DC4
- 1. "Froze" Released: October 27, 2016; 2. "Litty" Released: February 14, 2017

Professional ratings
Review scores
Source	Rating
AllMusic	3.5/5 stars
Pitchfork	6.9/10

DC4 (abbreviation of Dreamchasers 4) is the eleventh mixtape by American rapper Meek Mill. It was released on October 27, 2016, by Maybach Music Group, Dream Chasers Records and Atlantic Records. The mixtape serves as the fourth installment of his Dreamchasers series, following Dreamchasers 3 (2013). It features guest appearances from Tory Lanez, Lil Uzi Vert, Nicki Minaj, Quavo, Don Q, Young Thug, 21 Savage, YFN Lucci, Maybach Music Group, Guordan Banks, Pusha T, Lil Snupe, and French Montana.

== Cover art ==
Artist R. Craig designed the artwork for DC4, recreating a mugshot of Meek when he was 18 years old. Meek spoke to Billboard about the police brutality he experienced before taking the image, He said, "[I had] a concussion, stitches, braids ripped out," he said. "My blood was on the ceiling, on the floor."

== Commercial performance ==
DC4 debuted at number three on the US Billboard 200, moving 87,000 units in its first week, with 45,000 pure album sales.

== Track listing ==
No.	Title	Writer(s)	Producer(s)	Length
1.	"On the Regular (Intro)"	Robert Williams; Carl Orff; Leslie West; Felix Pappalardi Jr.; Terrell McNeal; Rodriquez Smith; John Ventura; Norman Landsberg	MP808; RaRa^{[a]}	3:04
2.	"Blessed Up"	Williams; Nicholas Warwar; Tarik Azzouz; Clemm Rishad; Diondria Thornton; Christopher Thornton	Streetrunner; Azzouz^{[a]}	3:21
3.	"Litty" (featuring Tory Lanez)	Williams; Brandon Tillman; Raul Gonzalez; Daystar Peterson	Sound M.O.B.	4:40
4.	"Shine"	Williams; Warwar; Azzouz; Rishad; D. Thornton; C. Thornton	Streetrunner; Azzouz^{[a]}	5:27
5.	"Froze" (featuring Lil Uzi Vert and Nicki Minaj)	Williams; Bennie Briggman; Sonny Uwaezuoke; Symere Woods; Onika Maraj	Sonny Digital; Briggman^{[b]}	3:30
6.	"The Difference" (featuring Quavo)	Williams; Uwaezuoke; Quavious Marshall	Sonny Digital	3:25
7.	"Lights Out" (featuring Don Q)	Williams; Terrell Johnson; Kevin Gomringer; Tim Gomringer; Le'Quincy Anderson	Infamous Rell; Cubeatz^{[a]}	3:12
8.	"Blue Notes" (featuring Snowy White)	Williams; Antonio Jimenez; Terence White	Butter Beats (Dolla Bill Kidz)	3:47
9.	"Offended" (featuring Young Thug and 21 Savage)	Williams; Ozan Yildirim; K. Gomringer; T. Gomringer; Shane Lindstrom; Jeffery Williams; Shayaa Joseph	OZ; Cubeatz^{[a]}; Murda Beatz^{[b]}	4:16
10.	"You Know" (featuring YFN Lucci)	Williams; Maraj; Michael Hernandez; Carlos Suarez; Altariq Crapps; Rayshawn Bennett	The Mekanics; Tariq Beats^{[a]}	4:24
11.	"Way Up" (featuring Tracy T)	Williams; Carlton Mays Jr.; Tracy Richardson	Honorable C.N.O.T.E.	3:10
12.	"Two Wrongs" (featuring Guordan Banks and Pusha T)	Williams; Nicholas Verruto; Guordan Banks; Terrence Thornton	Nick Verruto	3:47
13.	"Tony Story 3"	Williams; Orlando Tucker	Jahlil Beats	4:30
14.	"Outro" (featuring Lil Snupe and French Montana)	Williams; Yildirim; Anthony Tucker; Nickolas Papamitrou; Addarren Ross; Karim Kharbouch	OZ; The Beat Bully; Papamitrou^{[b]}	4:58
Total length:				55:38

Track notes

- ^{^[a]} signifies a co-producer
- ^{^[b]} signifies an additional producer
- "The Difference" features background vocals from Desiigner
- "Blue Notes" features additional vocals from British guitarist Snowy White
- "You Know" features additional vocals from Nicki Minaj
- "Outro" features additional vocals from Rihmeek "Papi" Williams, who is Meek Mill's son

Sample credits

- "On the Regular" contains samples of "O Fortuna", performed by Carl Orff; and "Hate Me Now", performed by Nas and Puff Daddy.
- "Blessed Up" contains samples of "Think (About It)", performed by Lyn Collins.
- "Blue Notes" contains samples of "Midnight Blues", performed by Snowy White, who is featured in the song.
- "Outro" contains uncredited samples of "Dreams & Nightmares", performed by Meek Mill.

== Charts ==
=== Weekly charts ===
Chart (2016)	Peak position
Australian Albums (ARIA)	58
Belgian Albums (Ultratop Flanders)	150
Belgian Albums (Ultratop Wallonia)	154
Canadian Albums (Billboard)	10
Dutch Albums (Album Top 100)	32
French Albums (SNEP)	131
New Zealand Heatseekers Albums (RMNZ)	4
UK Albums (OCC)	48
US Billboard 200	3
US Top R&B/Hip-Hop Albums (Billboard)	2

=== Year-end charts ===
Chart (2016)	Position
US Top R&B/Hip-Hop Albums (Billboard)	59
