= Everyday Street Gangsta =

Studio album by E.S.G.
- Released: September 29, 2009
- Genre: Southern hip hop; gangsta rap
- Length: 1:08:12
- Label: E1 Music
- Producer: E.S.G. (exec.); Mike B.; Sean Blaze; Al Rucker; Da Herb Man; DJ B-Do; Harvee Luv; J-Cutt; Mike Boogie; So Unique

E.S.G. chronology
Digital Dope: The Reintroduction (2009)	Everyday Street Gangsta (2009)	Owner's Manual (2011)

Everyday Street Gangsta is the eighth solo studio album (and his tenth overall) by American rapper E.S.G. from Houston, Texas. It was released on September 29, 2009, via E1 Music. The album peaked at #100 on the US Billboard Top R&B/Hip-Hop Albums chart.

== Track listing ==
No.	Title	Producer(s)	Length
1.	"Intro (Everyday Street Gangsta)" (featuring Streets Gov.)	So Unique	3:27
2.	"Esg"	Mike B.	4:06
3.	"We Still Tippin'" (featuring Bun B)	Mike B.; Da Herb Man	4:54
4.	"Gangstas Anthem"	Sean Blaze	4:05
5.	"Worry 'Bout Yoself" (featuring Duane Harris)	J-Cutt	3:57
6.	"Shut Them Haters Up"	Al Rucker; Mike Boogie	4:13
7.	"Break Them Boys Off" (featuring Big Hawk & Slim Thug)	Sean Blaze	3:49
8.	"Smoke On" (featuring Young Beast)	D.J. Harvey Luv	4:44
9.	"June 27, 2010" (featuring Big Moe)	DJ B-Do	4:21
10.	"Soldier" (featuring Chamillionaire)	Sean Blaze	3:58
11.	"Top Chopped Off"	Mike B.; Da Herb Man	4:25
12.	"I'm On" (featuring Killa B)	Al Rucker; Mike Boogie	4:17
13.	"Prayed Up"	J-Cutt	4:13
14.	"Get Around (The H)" (featuring Trae)	Sean Blaze	4:19
15.	"No Luv Fo 'Em"	Mike B.	3:18
16.	"R.I.P." (featuring Duane Harris)	D.J. Harvey Luv	6:04
Total length:			1:08:12

== Charts ==
Chart (2009)	Peak position
US Top R&B/Hip-Hop Albums (Billboard)	100
