= Litty =

2017 song by Meek Mill ft. Tory Lanez

Single by Meek Mill featuring Tory Lanez

from the album DC4
- Released: February 14, 2017
- Genre: Hip hop; trap
- Length: 4:41
- Label: MMG; Atlantic
- Songwriters: Robert Williams; Brandon Tillman; Raul Gonzalez; Daystar Peterson
- Producer: Sound M.O.B.

Meek Mill singles chronology
"Froze" (2016)	"Litty" (2017)	"Glow Up" (2017)

Tory Lanez singles chronology
"Damn" (2016)	"Litty" (2017)	"Es Rollt" (2017)

Music video
- "Litty (feat. Tory Lanez)" on YouTube

"Litty" is a song by American rapper Meek Mill featuring Tory Lanez. It was sent to urban contemporary radio on February 14, 2017, as the lead single from Mill's eleventh mixtape DC4 (2016). It's about both rappers talking about their luxurious lifestyles and taking shots at Drake. "Litty" debuted and peaked at number 49 on the Billboard Hot 100. It also reached numbers 14 and 18 on the Hot Rap Songs and Hot R&B/Hip-Hop Songs charts respectively. It was certified Platinum by the Recording Industry Association of America (RIAA), denoting sales of over a million units in the United States. The track also charted in Canada, peaking at number 54 on the Canadian Hot 100. An accompanying music video for the single, released on Mill's 30th birthday, features both artists as part of a crew of young hustlers committing credit card scams.

== Background and composition ==
"Litty" is a hip hop and trap song. The rappers talk about their luxurious lifestyles with "machismo-like" lyrics. Due to his heavy use of AutoTune, Tory Lanez's feature was initially mistaken for Travis Scott. Meek Mill and Tory Lanez both take shots at Drake; Lanez references Quentin Miller, whom Mill accused as a ghostwriter of Drake in a number of his songs.

== Commercial performance ==
On the week of November 19, 2016, "Litty" debuted and peaked at number 49 on the Billboard Hot 100, and stayed on the chart for four weeks. It was certified platinum by the RIAA in the US on May 6, 2019. In Canada, the track debuted and peaked at number 54 on the Canadian Hot 100, the same week it first appeared on the Billboard Hot 100. Five weeks later, it dropped to number 86 the week of December 24 before leaving the chart. The song reappeared at number 95 the week of January 21, 2017, and made its last appearance in that position on the week of February 11, remaining on the chart for twelve weeks.

== Music video ==
The music video was released on May 6, 2017, Meek Mill's 30th birthday. It features a crew of young hustlers, including Mill and Lanez, who pull off credit card scams. The police get involved and attempt to hinder their operations, but the criminals evade them. Meek and Tory also hang out at an airport and flex.

== Remixes ==
American rapper Joyner Lucas released a remix of the song on November 20, 2018, entitled "Litty Freestyle", as a diss track targeting Tory Lanez and Trippie Redd. Lanez responded the next day with a remix of the song as well, titled "Litty Again Freestyle".

== Charts ==
Chart (2016)	Peak position
Canada Hot 100 (Billboard)	54
US Billboard Hot 100	49
US Hot R&B/Hip-Hop Songs (Billboard)	18

== Certifications ==
Region	Certification	Certified units/sales
United States (RIAA)	Platinum	1,000,000^{‡}
^{‡} Sales+streaming figures based on certification alone.

== Release history ==
Country	Date	Format	Label	Ref.
United States	February 14, 2017	Urban contemporary radio	MMG; Atlantic	
