= Ocean of Funk =

Studio album by E.S.G.
- Released: February 1, 1994
- Recorded: 1993–1994
- Studios: J2 Recording Studio (Houston, TX); Sound Arts (Houston, TX)
- Genres: G-funk; southern rap; gangsta rap
- Length: 1:05:24
- Label: Perrion Entertainment
- Producers: Steven Caldwell (exec.); Eric Bowen (exec.); Earl Winters; Sean "Solo" Jemison

E.S.G. chronology
Ocean of Funk (1994)	Sailin' Da South (1995)

Singles from Ocean of Funk
- 1. "Swangin And Bangin" Released: 1994

Professional ratings
Review scores
Source	Rating
AllMusic	2.5/5 stars

Ocean of Funk is the debut studio album by American rapper E.S.G. from Houston, Texas. It was released on February 1, 1994 via Perrion Records.

== Track listing ==
No.	Title	Length
1.	"Intro"	1:49
2.	"Swangin' and Bangin' (Screwed)"	5:59
3.	"The South"	4:05
4.	"Crooked Streets" (featuring Big 50)	4:09
5.	"If It Ain't One Thang It's Another"	5:15
6.	"Anticipation"	4:08
7.	"Flipping" (featuring Lil' Wil & Big 50)	3:49
8.	"My Real Niggaz"	4:23
9.	"Ocean of Funk" (featuring Marcus Bolden)	3:27
10.	"How Many Hoes"	4:26
11.	"Birdies That Don't Chirp"	4:06
12.	"Two Glocks Two Hoes"	4:02
13.	"9-Trey"	4:04
14.	"Swangin and Bangin"	4:56
15.	"Smoke On" (featuring Big 50, Big T, Lil' Wil & Yellowstone Click)	6:46
Total length:		1:05:24

== Sample credits ==
9-Trey

- "This Is Your Life" by Commodores

Birdies That Don't Chirp

- "Voyage to Atlantis" by The Isley Brothers
- "Skanless" by DJ Quik

Flipping

- "Love and Happiness" by Al Green

Anticipation

- "Anticipation" by Bar-Kays

My Real Niggaz

- "Ashley's Roachclip" by The Soul Searchers
- "Representin' 93" by 2Pac
- "Quik's Groove" by DJ Quik

Smoke On

- "Float On" by The Floaters
- ”Sexual Healing” by Marvin Gaye

== Personnel ==
- Cedric Dormaine Hill – main artist, assistant engineering
- Deon Britten – featured artist (tracks: 4, 7, 15)
- Lil' Wil – featured artist (tracks: 7, 15)
- Marcus Bolden – featured artist (track 9)
- A. Morgan – featured artist (track 15)
- Yellowstone Click – featured artists (track 15)
- Sean "Solo" Jemison – producer
- Earl Winters – producer
- Clay James – mixing & engineering
- Robert Earl Davis, Jr. – editor (track 2)
- Steven Caldwell – executive producer
- Eric Bowen – executive producer
- Pen & Pixel – design & layout
