= Sailin' Da South =

Studio album by E.S.G.
- Released: September 12, 1995
- Recorded: 1994–1995
- Studio: J2 Recording Studio (Houston, TX)
- Genre: G-funk; southern rap; gangsta rap
- Length: 48:58
- Label: Perrion Entertainment; Priority Records
- Producer: Steven Caldwell (exec.); Eric Bowen (exec.); Mel Smith (exec.); Jermaine "Mr. Optimo" Chretien; Sean "Solo" Jemison

E.S.G. chronology
Ocean of Funk (1994)	Sailin' Da South (1995)	Return of the Living Dead (1998)

Sailin' Da South is the second studio album by American rapper E.S.G. from Houston, Texas. It was released on September 12, 1995 via Priority Records, making it his first record on a major label. The album peaked at #29 on the Top R&B/Hip-Hop Albums and #19 on the Heatseekers Albums in the US Billboard charts.

== Track listing ==
1. "Sailin' Da South" (Intro) - 1:56
2. "187 Skillz" - 3:11
3. "Crooked Streets" (featuring Big 50) - 4:06
4. "R.I.P." (featuring Montina Cooper) - 3:51
5. "Swangin' and Bangin'" - 4:44
6. "Let 'Em Know" (featuring Flava) - 3:35
7. "Beauty and the Beast" (featuring Montina Cooper) - 3:25
8. "G-Ride" (featuring Flava) - 3:32
9. "Baller of the Year" - 3:39
10. "For All the G's" (featuring Flava) - 4:05
11. "Swangin' and Bangin' (Screwed by DJ Screw)" - 5:39
12. "Smoke On" (featuring Big 50, Big T, Lil' Will & Yellowstone Click) - 4:41
13. "Murder Outro" (featuring Kalo) - 2:36
