= Digital Dope =

Studio album by E.S.G.
- Released: February 10, 2009
- Recorded: 2009
- Genre: Southern rap
- Label: Gracie Productions
- Producer: E.S.G. (exec.); Dorian Washington (exec.); Harvey Luv; Sean Blaze; Jermaine "Mr. Optimo" Chretien; Unique; Da Beat Kings; D Smuv; Bam; DJ B-Do

E.S.G. chronology
Screwed Up Movement (2006)	Digital Dope (2009)	Everyday Street Gangsta (2009)

Digital Dope: The Reintroduction is the street album by American rapper E.S.G. from Houston, Texas. It was released on February 10, 2009 via Gracie Productions. The album features guest appearances from Big T, C-Note and Lil' Keke among others.

The single from the album is "Actin' Bad".

== Track listing ==
No.	Title	Producer(s)	Length
1.	"Ballin Just a Hobby" (featuring Big Cliff & DJ B-Do)	Unique	5:28
2.	"One Hundred" (featuring Lil' Keke & Big Boy S.A.)	Da Beat Kings	4:07
3.	"I Don't Dance"	D.J. Harvee Luv	4:42
4.	"I'm Bad"	Sean Blaze	4:27
5.	"Wutchu On"	D.J. Harvee Luv	4:08
6.	"Paying My Dues" (featuring Duane Harris)	D Smuv	4:27
7.	"Whip It"	Sean Blaze	4:20
8.	"Fake and Real" (featuring C Money & Fred T)	Jermaine "Mr. Optimo" Chretien	3:45
9.	"Gettem Hi"	Jermaine "Mr. Optimo" Chretien	4:25
10.	"Making Money" (featuring C-Note, Big T & J.Stew)	Bam	6:17
11.	"Actin Bad"	DJ B-Do	3:51
