= Screwed Up Movement =

Studio album by E.S.G.
- Released: May 16, 2006
- Recorded: 2005–2006
- Genre: Southern rap
- Length: 2:29:48
- Label: Sure Shot Recordings
- Producer: E.S.G. (exec.); Chris Landry (exec.); Jordan Ponce; G-Bo; Big Swift; Sean Blaze; Phil; Marcus Lee; Chauncey; Puntin

E.S.G. chronology
All American Gangsta (2004)	Screwed Up Movement (2006)	Digital Dope (2009)

Professional ratings
Review scores
Source	Rating
AllHipHop	3/5 stars
AllMusic	2.5/5 stars

Screwed Up Movement is the seventh studio album by American rapper E.S.G. from Houston, Texas. It was released as a double album on May 16, 2006 via Sure Shot Recordings. Its disc 2 is a 'Slowed & Throwed' version of its disc 1 edited by DJ Dolby D. The album features guest appearances from Big T, Bun B, Chamillionaire, Fred T and Jae Millz.

== Track listing ==
Disc 1
No.	Title	Producer(s)	Length
1.	"Intro"		3:55
2.	"Hold Up"	Puntin	4:10
3.	"Back in the Building"	Jordan Ponce; G-Bo	4:07
4.	"Gorilla Music"	Jordan Ponce; G-Bo	4:26
5.	"Ride Wit Us" (featuring Bun B & Chamillionaire)	Big Swift	4:50
6.	"Purped Out"	Marcus Lee	4:43
7.	"Keep Getting It"	Jordan Ponce; G-Bo	4:04
8.	"No Matter What"	Sean Blaze; Phil	4:09
9.	"Not a Workout Song"	Jordan Ponce; G-Bo	3:41
10.	"Southside Pop Trunks" (featuring Big T)	Jordan Ponce; G-Bo	5:20
11.	"How We Swang"	Big Swift	4:20
12.	"Gotta Shine" (featuring Fred T)	Jordan Ponce; G-Bo	4:44
13.	"Gangsta" (featuring Jae Millz)	Chauncey	4:22
14.	"Grand National"	Jordan Ponce; G-Bo	4:22
15.	"Interlude"		1:31
16.	"Watch Yo Back" (Slim Thug diss)	Sean Blaze; Phil	5:09
17.	"Revelation"	Jordan Ponce; G-Bo	4:24

Disc 2 - Slowed & Throwed
No.	Title	Length
18.	"Intro"	4:38
19.	"Gorilla Music"	5:28
20.	"Grand National"	4:25
21.	"Ride Wit Us" (featuring Bun B & Chamillionaire)	5:40
22.	"How We Swang"	5:01
23.	"Southside Pop Trunks" (featuring Big T)	5:58
24.	"Hold Up"	4:36
25.	"Purped Out"	5:38
26.	"Keep Getting It"	4:27
27.	"Back in the Building"	4:47
28.	"Gangsta" (featuring Jae Millz)	4:55
29.	"Interlude"	1:45
30.	"Watch Yo Back (Slim Thug Diss)"	5:53
31.	"Gotta Shine" (featuring Fred T)	5:26
32.	"No Matter What"	4:26
33.	"Not a Workout Song"	4:29
Total length:		2:29:48
