= The Naked Soul of Sweet Jones =

Studio album by Pimp C
- Released: October 5, 2010
- Recorded: 2006–2007
- Genre: Southern hip hop
- Length: 58:52
- Labels: J. Prince; Rap-A-Lot 4 Life; Fontana
- Producers: DJ B-Do; Big E; Cory Mo; Steve Below; Boi-1da; David Banner; Jazze Pha; Mike Dean; Mouse; Nick Bongers; V-Man

Pimp C chronology
Pimpalation (2006)	The Naked Soul of Sweet Jones (2010)	Still Pimping (2011)

Professional ratings
Review scores
Source	Rating
AllMusic	3.5/5 stars
HipHopDX	4/5
Pitchfork	6.4/10
RapReviews	6/10

The Naked Soul of Sweet Jones is the third solo studio album by American rapper Pimp C. It was released through J. Prince Entertainment, Rap-A-Lot Records, and Fontana Distribution on October 5, 2010, making it his first posthumous solo release. The album features guest appearances from Bun B, Da Underdawgz, BankRoll Jonez, Bub, Chamillionaire, Cory Mo, Drake, E-40, Hezeleo, Ivory P., Jazze Pha, J-Dawg, Lil' Boosie, Rick Ross, Slim Thug, The Gator Mane, Too $hort, Webbie and Young Jeezy.

The album debuted at number 25 on the Billboard 200, and has sold 18,000 units in its first week in the United States.

== Track listing ==
No.	Title	Writer(s)	Producer(s)	Length
1.	"Down 4 Mine"	Chad Butler; C. Moore	Cory Mo	5:02
2.	"What Up?" (featuring Bun B & Drake)	Chad Butler; Bernard Freeman; Aubrey Graham; Matthew Samuels; Nick Bongers	Boi-1da; Nick Bongers; DJ B-Do	4:24
3.	"Love 2 Ball" (featuring Chamillionaire)	Chad Butler; Hakeem Seriki; Steve Below	Steve Below	4:29
4.	"Fly Lady" (featuring Jazze Pha)	Chad Butler; Phalon Alexander	Jazze Pha	4:26
5.	"Since the 90's" (featuring The Gator Main & E-40)	Chad Butler; Earl Stevens Sr.; Kenneth Piper; Elimu Tabasuri	Big E	3:59
6.	"Dickies" (featuring Bun B & Young Jeezy)	Chad Butler; Bernard Freeman; Jay Jenkins; Bradley Davis	DJ B-Do	4:10
7.	"Made 4" (featuring Too $hort)	Chad Butler; Todd Shaw; Elimu Tabasuri; Mike Dean	Big E; Mike Dean	6:06
8.	"Midnight" (featuring Rick Ross & Slim Thug)	Chad Butler; S. Thomas; W. Roberts; Lavell Crump	David Banner	3:48
9.	"Believe in Me" (featuring Ivory P., Cory Mo, Hezeleo, BankRoll Jonez, Bub & Da Underdawgz)	Chad Butler; C. Moore	Cory Mo	4:40
10.	"Hit the Parking Lot" (featuring Webbie & Lil' Boosie)	Chad Butler; Torrence Hatch; Webster Gradney; J. Allen	Mouse	5:05
11.	"Colors" (featuring Da Underdawgz)	Chad Butler; T. McKinney; Bradley Davis	DJ B-Do	4:04
12.	"Go 2 War" (featuring Bun B & J-Dawg)	Chad Butler; Bernard Freeman; L. Jones; Steve Below	Steve Below	3:46
13.	"Massacre"	Chad Butler; C. Valach	V-Man	4:54
Total length:				58:52

Sample credits

- Track 1 contains an interpolation of "If You Let Me" written by Frank Wilson and performed by Eddie Kendricks.

== Charts ==
Chart (2010)	Peak position
US Billboard 200	25
US Top R&B/Hip-Hop Albums (Billboard)	8
US Top Rap Albums (Billboard)	5
US Independent Albums (Billboard)	4
US Indie Store Album Sales (Billboard)	22
