= That's Gangsta =

Single by Bun B featuring Sean Kingston

from the album II Trill
- Released: February 19, 2008
- Recorded: 2007
- Genre: Hip hop
- Length: 3:53
- Label: Rap-A-Lot; Asylum; Warner Bros.
- Songwriters: Bernard Freeman; Kisean Anderson; Jonathan Rotem
- Producer: J.R. Rotem

Bun B singles chronology
"Down in tha Dirty" (2007)	"That's Gangsta" (2008)	"You're Everything" (2008)

Sean Kingston singles chronology
"What Is It" (2008)	"That's Gangsta" (2008)	"There's Nothin (Remix)" (2008)

"That's Gangsta" is the first single from the Bun B album II Trill. It features Sean Kingston and is produced by J.R. Rotem. The single peaked at #45 on the U.S. Billboard Hot R&B/Hip-Hop Songs chart. The video is released on MTV2's Unleashed on April 21, 2008. The video features cameos from Young Buck, Middle Fingaz, P$C, J Prince, LeBron James, Chamillionaire and Slim Thug. There were also UGK Records artists Young T.O.E., XVII, B-Do and Big Bubb. Sean Kingston didn't appear in the music video.

== Chart positions ==
Chart	Peak position
U.S. Billboard Bubbling Under Hot 100 Singles	22
U.S. Billboard Hot R&B/Hip-Hop Songs	45
U.S. Billboard Hot Rap Tracks	16
