= II Trill =

Album by Bun B

Studio album by Bun B
- Released: May 20, 2008
- Recorded: 2007–08
- Genre: Southern hip-hop
- Label: II Trill; Double Dose; J. Prince; Rap-A-Lot 4 Life; Asylum
- Producer: Bigg Tyme; Chops; Clinton Sparks; Cory Mo; Cozmo; DJ Khalil; Enigma; Jazze Pha; J Rock; J. R. Rotem; Mouse; Mr. Lee; Scott Storch; The BlackOut Movement

Bun B chronology
Trill (2005)	II Trill (2008)	Trill OG (2010)

Singles from II Trill
- 1. "That's Gangsta" Released: February 19, 2008; 2. "You're Everything" Released: July 31, 2008

II Trill is the second solo studio album by American rapper Bun B. It was released on May 20, 2008, through Bun B's label of the same name, II Trill Enterprises, Double Dose Entertainment, J. Prince Entertainment, and Rap-A-Lot Records with distribution via Asylum Records, serving as a sequel to his successful debut 2005 album Trill.

Production was handled by Bigg Tyme, Chops, Cory Mo, Clinton Sparks, Cozmo, DJ Khalil, Enigma, Jazze Pha, J Rock, J. R. Rotem, Mouse, Mr. Lee, Scott Storch and The BlackOut Movement. It features guest appearances from 8Ball & MJG, Chamillionaire, David Banner, Jazze Pha, J. Prince, Junior Reid, Juvenile, Kobe, Lil' Razah, Lil Wayne, Lupe Fiasco, Lyfe Jennings, Mddl Fngz, Mýa, Mike Jones, Rick Ross, Sean Kingston, Webbie, Young Buck, Z-Ro, Slim Thug, and the late Pimp C.

The album debuted at number two on the Billboard 200 and topped both the Top R&B/Hip-Hop Albums and Top Rap Albums charts in the United States, with 98,000 copies sold in the first week of release. It was supported with singles "That's Gangsta" and "You're Everything", as well as the song "Pop It 4 Pimp" has also received radio airplay.

== Background ==
The album was originally set to be released on April 29, 2008, but was pushed back to May 20.

It was mentioned that after the death of his lifelong friend and companion Pimp C, due in part to an accidental overdose, he is likely to "ban the syrup talk on his new CD". The album features lyrics pertaining to political and social issues, as well as a tribute track to his UGK cohort.

The album also spent three weeks at the top of the Billboard Rap Albums chart in a row. It went on to sell over 200,000 copies.

== Critical reception ==
Professional ratings
Aggregate scores
Source	Rating
Metacritic	82/100
Review scores
Source	Rating
AllMusic	3.5/5 stars
Cokemachineglow	73/100%
HipHopDX	4/5
Los Angeles Times	3.5/4 stars
MSN Music	(1-star Honorable Mention)
Pitchfork	7.7/10
PopMatters	8/10
RapReviews	9/10
Spin	3.5/5 stars
UGO	B

II Trill was met with generally favourable reviews from music critics. At Metacritic, which assigns a normalized rating out of 100 to reviews from mainstream publications, the album received an average score of 82 based on seventeen reviews.

Steve 'Flash' Juon of RapReviews praised the album, saying "with II Trill Bun B's ensured the legacy of U.G.K. will exist for decades to come, but more importantly he's created the album that every hip-hop head from North to South with have rattling out of their trunk all summer long". Jeff Weiss of the Los Angeles Times stated: "Bun B's second solo record is an impressive late-career triumph, one with a poignancy and resonance worthy of his dedication and devotion to the memory of his departed friend". Jordan Sargent of PopMatters concluded: "II Trill is obviously not Bun B's defining musical statement; UGK has way too many classics in the bank for that. What it is, though, is a consistently great rap album by a consistently great emcee". Tom Breihan of Pitchfork called it "a solid and occasionally great record, an album more directed toward car-stereo utility than bedroom contemplation". Clayton Purdom of Cokemachineglow found "the record attempts nothing: it doesn't stretch or break a sweat but celebrates its easy victory ecstatically, like some asshole Olympic sprinter racing against a middle school track team". AllMusic's David Jeffries claimed: "this time out, he's a single short and couple songs too long, but his back is strong enough to carry the weight, proving once again he's one of the Dirty South's most reliable voices". Will Dukes of Spin resumed: "Bun combines swagger with substance without losing a step".

== Track listing ==
II Trill track listing
No.	Title	Writer(s)	Producer(s)	Length
1.	"II Trill" (featuring Z-Ro and J. Prince)	Bernard Freeman; Joseph McVey; James Smith; Clinton Sparks	Clinton Sparks	4:19
2.	"That's Gangsta" (featuring Sean Kingston)	Freeman; Kisean Anderson; Jonathan Rotem	J. R. Rotem	3:52
3.	"Damn I'm Cold" (featuring Lil Wayne)	Freeman; Dwayne Carter; Scott Jung	CHOPS	4:31
4.	"You're Everything" (featuring Rick Ross, David Banner, 8Ball and MJG)	Freeman; William Roberts; Lavell Crump; Premro Smith; Marlon Goodwin; Leroy Williams	Mr. Lee	4:36
5.	"I Luv That"	Freeman; Scott Storch	Scott Storch	4:02
6.	"Swang on Em" (featuring Lupe Fiasco)	Freeman; Wasalu Jaco; Richard Hervey	Enigma	3:21
7.	"My Block" (featuring Jazze Pha)	Freeman; Phalon Alexander	Jazze Pha	4:16
8.	"Get Cha Issue"	Freeman; Randy Jefferson; Gary Cunningham	Bigg Tyme; Joshua Moore (add.)	4:11
9.	"Pop It 4 Pimp" (featuring Juvenile and Webbie)	Freeman; Terius Gray; Webster Gradney; Jeremy Allen	Mouse	3:50
10.	"Good II Me" (featuring Mýa)	Freeman; Mya Harrison; Jefferson; Anzel Jennings	Bigg Tyme; Bun B (co.); Int'l Red (co.); Joshua Moore (co.)	4:49
11.	"Underground Thang" (featuring Pimp C and Chamillionaire)	Freeman; Chad Butler; Hakeem Sereki; Cory Moore	Cory Mo	4:28
12.	"If I Die II Night" (featuring Young Buck and Lyfe Jennings)	Freeman; David Brown; Chester Jennings; Jean Borges	J Rock	4:15
13.	"Another Soldier" (featuring Mddl Fngz and Kobe)	Freeman; Brian Honeycutt; Khalil Abdul-Rahman	DJ Khalil	4:18
14.	"If It Was Up II Me" (featuring Junior Reid)	Freeman; Delroy Reid; Winston Thomas; Daniel Schofield	The BlackOut Movement	4:57
15.	"Trill Talk"			0:14
16.	"Angel in the Sky" (featuring Lil' Razah)	Freeman; M. Nelson; Cosmo Hickox	Cozmo	4:57
17.	"II Trill Talk"			0:07
18.	"Keep It 100"	Freeman; Jung	CHOPS	4:36

Best Buy exclusive bonus tracks
No.	Title	Writer(s)	Producer(s)	Length
19.	"City of the Swang" (featuring Mike Jones and Slim Thug)	Freeman; Michael Jones; Stayve Thomas; Moore	Cory Mo	3:58
20.	"Some Hoes" (featuring BulletProof, Chino XL and Killer Mike)	Freeman; Justin Jerrell Marshall; Derek Barbosa; Michael Render; Desmond Mapp	Dez Dynamic	4:49

Sample credits

- Track 4 contains a portion of "Cry for You" written by Donald Earle DeGrate Jr., Raymond E. Jones and Robert Jones as performed by Jodeci.
- Track 9 contains a portion of "Back That Azz Up" written and performed by Juvenile.
- Track 10 contains an interpolation of "Just Be Good to Me" written by James Samuel Harris III and Terry Steven Lewis as performed by The S.O.S. Band.
- Track 11 contains a portion of "Steppin' Out" written by David Hinds and performed by Steel Pulse.
- Track 16 contains an interpolation of "Ribbon in the Sky" written and performed by Stevie Wonder.

== Charts ==
=== Weekly charts ===
Chart (2008)	Peak position
US Billboard 200	2
US Top R&B/Hip-Hop Albums (Billboard)	1
US Top Rap Albums (Billboard)	1

=== Year-end charts ===
Chart (2008)	Position
US Billboard 200	158
US Top R&B/Hip-Hop Albums (Billboard)	38
US Top Rap Albums (Billboard)	15

== See also ==
- List of Billboard number-one R&B/hip-hop albums of 2008
