= You're Everything =

Single by Bun B featuring David Banner, Rick Ross and 8Ball & MJG

from the album II Trill
- A-side: "That's Gangsta"
- B-side: "Pop It 4 Pimp"
- Released: July 31, 2008
- Recorded: 2008
- Genre: Hip hop
- Length: 4:36
- Label: Rap-A-Lot; Asylum; Warner Bros.
- Songwriters: Bernard Freeman; William Roberts; Lavell Crump; Premro Smith; Marlon Goodwin; Leroy Williams
- Producer: Mr. Lee

Bun B singles chronology
"That's Gangsta" (2008)	"You're Everything" (2008)	"Countin' Money" (2008)

David Banner singles chronology
"Get Like Me" (2008)	"You're Everything" (2008)	"Shawty Say" (2008)

Rick Ross singles chronology
"Out Here Grindin" (2008)	"You're Everything" (2008)	"Mafia Music" (2008)

8Ball & MJG singles chronology
"Spit Your Game [Remix]" (2006)	"You're Everything" (2008)	"Bring It Back" (2010)

"You're Everything" is a song by American rapper Bun B, released July 31, 2008 as the third single from his second studio album II Trill (2008). The song, produced by Mr. Lee, features fellow southern rappers Rick Ross, David Banner and 8Ball & MJG. The video was released August 6, 2008, on BET's Access Granted.

== Background ==
In 8Ball's verse, he reels off a list of Dirty South rappers (in order) Pimp C, Bun B, 8Ball & MJG, Big Boi, André 3000 (named as Dre Three-Thou), Scarface, Willie D, T.I. (named as T.I.P.), Young Jeezy, Birdman, Lil Wayne (named as Lil Weezy), Trick Daddy, Young Buck, Jermaine Dupri, J. Prince, Juicy J, DJ Paul, Slim Thug, Lil' Keke, Chamillionaire, and Paul Wall. He also mentions record companies So So Def (named after Jermaine Dupri) and Rap-a-Lot Records (named after J. Prince).

The song uses the drum beats of 808's and 909's.

The song uses a sample from "Cry for You" by Jodeci. Rapper E-40 sampled "You're Everything" in his song "That Candy Paint" also featuring Bun B and Slim Thug, from E-40's 2011 album Revenue Retrievin': Graveyard Shift.

== Remixes ==
Chamillionaire did a freestyle to the song called "Do It for H Town" featuring Trae and Slim Thug for Mixtape Messiah 4, and another called "Everything" featuring Crooked I for Mixtape Messiah 6.

== Charts ==
Chart (2008)	Peak Position
U.S. Billboard Hot R&B/Hip-Hop Songs	59
