= Trill OG =

Studio album by Bun B
- Released: August 3, 2010
- Recorded: 2008–2010
- Genre: Hip hop
- Length: 60:23
- Labels: II Trill; Double Dose; J. Prince; Rap-A-Lot; Fontana
- Producers: Big E; Boi-1da; D10; DJ B-Do; DJ Premier; Drumma Boy; Jordan Evans; Joshua Moore; J.U.S.T.I.C.E. League; Marq Moody; Matthew Burnett; Play-N-Skillz; Sound M.O.B.; Steve Below

Bun B chronology
II Trill (2008)	Trill OG (2010)	Trill OG: The Epilogue (2013)

Singles from Trill OG
- 1. "Countin' Money" Released: July 6, 2010; 2. "Trillionaire" Released: September 3, 2010; 3. "Just Like That" Released: October 17, 2010; 4. "Put It Down" Released: December 2010

Trill OG is the third studio album by American rapper Bun B. The album was released on August 3, 2010, by II Trill Enterprises, Double Dose Entertainment, J. Prince Entertainment, Rap-A-Lot Records and Fontana Distribution. On August 4, 2010, The Source magazine gave Trill OG its rare 5 mic rating.

== Conception ==
In 2009, Play, of production duo Play-N-Skillz, told MTV Canada that a single on Bun's upcoming album would feature 2Pac. In January 2010, Bun B told MTV that the album was scheduled for an April 2010 release. Additionally, Bun confirmed a collaboration with "a hip hop legend and a cultural icon" on the same song, but did not elaborate. He later declared the icons to be Tupac Shakur and Pimp C, along with Trey Songz singing the chorus. The song, "Right Now", was released in the summer of 2010. Bun summarized, "Tupac verse is from the 90's Pimp C's from the 2000s and mine from 2010 and it sounds like we just stepped out the booth yesterday."

== Reception ==
=== Commercial performance ===
The album debuted at number four on the US Billboard 200, selling 39,838 copies in its first week.

=== Critical response ===
Professional ratings
Review scores
Source	Rating
AllMusic	3.5/5 stars
Pitchfork Media	(5.0/10)
HipHopDX	3.5/5 stars
PopMatters	(4.0/10)
RapReviews	(8.5/10)
The Source	5/5 stars
Spin	3.5/5 stars
XXL	(XL)

Trill O.G. received mixed reviews from music critics. At Metacritic, which assigns a normalized rating out of 100 to reviews from mainstream critics, the album received an average score of 59, based on 9 reviews, which indicates "mixed or average reviews". However, Trill OG was the first album to receive a 5 Mic rating from The Source Magazine in five years, the last being Lil' Kim's The Naked Truth. HipHopDX said, "In the end, fans are left with a pleasant closing to a respected series, and one of Hip Hop's most respected voices still outshining the vast majority of his peers." XXL added, "The seasoned MC isn't exactly saying goodbye to rap. However, whenever he does decide to hang it up, Trill O.G. will surely go down as a testament to why Bun B is one of the trillest to ever do it."

David Amidon of PopMatters was more critical saying, "Ultimately, Bun ends up feeling like a bit of a guest on his own LP, similar to Rick Ross' Teflon Don effort, and though Trill O.G. is full of quality-sounding music it simply fails to make any argument for its necessity to anyone but the most strident fans of Bun B's monolithic presence." Tom Breihan of Pitchfork Media shared a similar sentiment. "Throughout, (Bun B) works in the same weary and vaguely clumsy cadence, never bringing the ebulliently eloquent verve he brought to his best UGK verses. Instead he merely seems to dutifully plug away every time he touches a mic. It's tough to imagine how a rapper as great as Bun has managed to turn out an album as consistently turgid and leaden as this."

== Singles ==
The album's lead single, "Countin' Money", which features Yo Gotti & Gucci Mane, was released on July 6, 2010. "Trillionaire", which features T-Pain, was released on July 13, 2010, as the second single. The third single, "Just Like That", which features Young Jeezy, was also released on July 13, 2010. The fourth single, "Put It Down", which features Drake was released in December 2010 and the music video was released on the internet December 22, 2010 via Bun B's VEVO account.

== Track listing ==
Credits adapted from album liner notes.

No.	Title	Writer(s)	Producer(s)	Length
1.	"Chuuch!!!" (featuring J. Prince)	Bernard Freeman; Steve Below	Below	4:46
2.	"Trillionaire" (featuring T-Pain)	Freeman; Faheem Najm; Kevin Crowe; Erik Ortiz; M. Primous	J.U.S.T.I.C.E. League	4:07
3.	"Just Like That" (featuring Young Jeezy and Boo)	Freeman; Jay Jenkins; Christopher Gholson; Sabrian Sledge; Darryl Richardson	Drumma Boy	4:16
4.	"Put It Down" (featuring Drake)	Freeman; Aubrey Graham; Matthew Samuels; Dalton "D10" Tennant	Boi-1da; D10	4:32
5.	"Right Now" (featuring Pimp C, 2Pac, and Trey Songz)	Freeman; Chad Butler; Tupac Shakur; Tremaine Neverson; Below	Below; Marq Moody^{[a]}	3:33
6.	"That's a Song" (skit; performed by Bluesman Ceddy St. Louis)			0:24
7.	"Countin' Money" (featuring Yo Gotti and Gucci Mane)	Freeman; Mario Mimms; Radric Davis; Bradley Davis	DJ B-Do	3:34
8.	"SpeakEasy" (featuring Twista and Bluesman Ceddy St. Louis)	Freeman; Carl Mitchell; Cedric Kyles; Elimu Tabasuri	Big E; Joshua Moore^{[a]}	4:04
9.	"Lights, Camera, Action"	Freeman; Below	Below	3:34
10.	"I Git Down 4 Mine"	Freeman; Below	Below	4:07
11.	"Snow Money"	Freeman; Below	Below	4:34
12.	"Ridin' Slow" (featuring Slim Thug and Play-N-Skillz)	Freeman; Stayve Thomas; Juan Salinas, Jr.; Oscar Salinas	Play-N-Skillz	5:09
13.	"Let 'Em Know"	Freeman; Christopher Martin	DJ Premier	4:11
14.	"Listen" (skit; performed by Bluesman Ceddy St. Louis)			0:24
15.	"All a Dream" (featuring LeToya Luckett)	Freeman; Crowe; Ortiz	J.U.S.T.I.C.E. League	3:23
16.	"It's Been a Pleasure" (featuring Drake)	Freeman; Graham; Samuels; Tennant	Boi-1da; D10; Jordan Evans^{[a]}; Matthew Burnett^{[a]}	5:46

Deluxe edition bonus tracks
No.	Title	Producer(s)	Length
17.	"Gladiator" (featuring Truck Buck)	Below; Evans^{[a]}; Marq Moody^{[a]}	4:45
18.	"Sext Me" (featuring Just Brittany, Candi Redd, Surreal, Troublesum, and RawLT)	Below	5:12
19.	"Real Live" (featuring Gator Mane and GLC)	Sound M.O.B.	4:45
20.	"Git In" (featuring Big Capp and Young Money Moe)	Below	4:25

iTunes bonus tracks
No.	Title	Producer(s)	Length
17.	"The Best Is Back"	Below	3:34
18.	"Untitled Flow (58 Bars)"	Below	2:54

Track notes

- ^{^[a]} signifies an additional producer
- "Chuuch!!!" features a chorus by Tekai Hicks, and additional background vocals by Erin Cortez and Marq Moody.
- "Lights, Camera, Action" features background vocals by Tekai Hicks.

== Charts ==
=== Weekly charts ===
Chart (2010)	Peak position
US Billboard 200	4
US Top R&B/Hip-Hop Albums (Billboard)	2

=== Year-end charts ===
Chart (2010)	Position
US Top R&B/Hip-Hop Albums (Billboard)	57
