= Keep It Trill =

Single by Kirko Bangz

from the album Bigger Than Me
- Released: November 30, 2012
- Recorded: 2012
- Genre: Hip hop, R&B
- Length: 3:26
- Label: LMG, Warner
- Songwriters: Kirk Randle, Raul Gonzalez, Dylan Saibic, Tim Kelley, Bob Robinson, Jon.B
- Producer: Sound M.O.B. DSAP

Kirko Bangz singles chronology
"Young & Gettin' It" (2012)	"Keep It Trill" (2012)

Keep It Trill is a song by rapper and singer Kirko Bangz. It was the first single intended for his debut album Bigger Than Me, an album which never released. The song was released on November 30, 2012 by Warner Bros. Records. The music video was directed by Benny Boom and released on March 1, 2013.

== Chart performance ==
The song peaked at number 49 on the Hot R&B/Hip-Hop Songs chart.

Chart (2013)	Peak position
US Hot R&B/Hip-Hop Songs (Billboard)	49
US Heatseekers Songs (Billboard)	25
