= All American Gangsta =

Studio album by E.S.G.
- Released: September 14, 2004
- Studio: Sin's Crib (Houston, TX)
- Genre: Southern rap
- Length: 1:19:22
- Label: S.E.S. Entertainment
- Producers: E.S.G. (exec.); Sin (also exec.); The Staff

E.S.G. chronology
City Under Siege (2000)	All American Gangsta (2004)	Screwed Up Movement (2006)

All American Gangsta is the sixth studio album by American rapper E.S.G., from Houston, Texas. It was released on September 14, 2004, via S.E.S. Entertainment. It features guest appearances from Slim Thug, Brandon Stacks, Bun B, Mr. Que, Fat Pat and A.G. The album peaked at number 73 on the Top R&B/Hip-Hop Albums in the US Billboard charts.

== Track listing ==
No.	Title	Length
1.	"Intro"	1:11
2.	"All American Gangsta"	4:11
3.	"Dirty Hustle"	4:35
4.	"Getting Money"	3:51
5.	"In You Wanna Ride With Us" (featuring Slim Thug & Brandon Stacks)	4:30
6.	"E.S.G."	3:26
7.	"In My Cadillac" (featuring Bun B & Slim Thug)	5:30
8.	"Comin' Down" (featuring Fat Pat)	4:14
9.	"South Side Comin'"	4:30
10.	"Snake-N-Da-Grass"	3:24
11.	"City on Lock Down" (featuring Slim Thug)	4:21
12.	"Coast 2 Coast"	4:14
13.	"Come With Me" (featuring Ideal)	4:02
14.	"Some of These"	3:58
15.	"I Should Hate You"	4:07
16.	"Can't Fuck With Us" (featuring Slim Thug)	3:54
17.	"Stay Strong"	5:05
18.	"What You See"	3:42
19.	"I'm a Beast" (featuring Mr. Que, A.G. & Brandon Stacks)	6:37
Total length:		1:19:22

== Personnel ==
- Cedric Dormaine Hill – main artist, executive producer
- Stayve Jerome Thomas – featured artist (tracks: 5, 7, 11, 16)
- Brandon Stacks – featured artist (tracks: 5, 19)
- Bernard Freeman – featured artist (track 7)
- Patrick Lamark Hawkins – featured artist (track 8)
- Ideal – featured artist (track 13)
- A.G. – featured artist (track 19), additional vocals (tracks: 2, 4, 9, 11)
- Mr. Que – featured artist (track 19)
- Kindle Rogers – additional vocals (track 4)
- Big Craig – additional vocals (track 6)
- Junyo – additional vocals (track 6)
- Ms. Marylin – additional vocals (tracks: 7, 12, 14–15)
- Taylor Gammage – additional vocals (track 8)
- Tia Williams – additional vocals (track 8)
- FEVA – additional vocals (track 9)
- Nanu – additional vocals (track 10)
- Sinclair "Sin" Ridley – additional vocals (tracks: 11, 18), programming (tracks: 2–3, 6–7, 11, 13, 18), mixing, recording, mastering, producer, executive producer
- Kirby – additional vocals (track 17)
- T May – programming (tracks: 1, 19)
- Sadik "BEAsTMASTER" McNeil – programming (track 4)
- John "Big Swift" Catalon – programming (tracks: 5, 8–9, 17)
- Dantly "Prowla" Wyatt – programming (tracks: 10, 14, 16)
- Quincy "Q-Stone" Whetstone – programming (tracks: 12, 15)
- The Staff – producer
- Mike Frost – artwork & design

== Charts ==
Chart (2004)	Peak position
US Top R&B/Hip-Hop Albums (Billboard)	73
