= Down in tha Dirty =

Single by Ludacris featuring Rick Ross & Bun B

from the album Strength in Numbers
- Released: November 13, 2007
- Recorded: 2007
- Genre: Southern hip hop
- Length: 4:35
- Label: Disturbing tha Peace, Def Jam
- Songwriter(s): Christopher Bridges, William Roberts, Bernard Freeman
- Producer(s): Clinton Sparks

Ludacris singles chronology
"Rock Star" (2007)	"Down in tha Dirty" (2007)	"Gimme Dat" (2008)

Rick Ross singles chronology
"Speedin'" (2007)	"Down in tha Dirty" (2007)	"The Boss" (2008)

Bun B singles chronology
"My 64" (2007)	"Down in tha Dirty" (2007)	"That's Gangsta" (2008)

"Down in tha Dirty" is the second single by rapper Ludacris for the unreleased Disturbing tha Peace compilation album, "Strength in Numbers". It features Bun B & Rick Ross and was produced by Clinton Sparks. The chorus, "Down in the dirty south, to be exact, gettin' money is a well known fact", is sampled from Bun B's verse on the song 'White Gurl' by E-40. The guitar is sampled from "So What'cha Want" by the Beastie Boys.

== Chart position ==
Chart (2007)	Peak Position
U.S. Billboard Hot R&B/Hip-Hop Songs	110
