= Drank in My Cup =

"Drank In My Cup"

Single by Kirko Bangz

from the album Progression 2: A Young Texas Playa
- Released: September 16, 2011
- Recorded: 2011
- Genre: Pop rap, chopped and screwed
- Length: 3:52
- Label: Warner Bros.
- Songwriters: Kirk Randle; Raul Gonzalez; Brandon Tillman
- Producer: Sound M.O.B.

Kirko Bangz singles chronology
| "What Yo Name Iz? (Remix)" (2011) | "Drank In My Cup" (2011) | "Young & Gettin' It" (2012) |

Alternative cover

Music video
- "Drank in My Cup" on YouTube

"Drank in My Cup" is a song by American rapper Kirko Bangz, released by Warner Records on September 9, 2011 as the lead single from his mixtape, Progression 2: A Young Texas Playa. Produced by the Houston-based duo Sound M.O.B., it remains Kirko Bangz's only song (as a lead artist) to enter the Billboard Hot 100—where it peaked at number 28—and received platinum certification by the Recording Industry Association of America (RIAA), signifying sales of 1,000,000 units domestically. Lyrically, the song discusses Bangz's ability to satisfy an adulterous woman's libido. The title refers to purple drank, a codeine-promethazine cocktail—often served in Sprite—symbolic of Houston's hip-hop scene, and closely associated with chopped and screwed music.

== Remixes ==
The official remix features 2 Chainz and Juelz Santana. J. Cole originally did a freestyle to the instrumental. Kirko Bangz also released a version of the remix with his vocals from the official remix. Rapper Bow Wow did another freestyle to "Drank in My Cup". Chamillionaire did a freestyle over the song called "I Think I'm in Love". Singer Trey Songz also did a freestyle to the song. Rapper Mysonne did a freestyle to the song. Rapper Ransom also freestyled to the song. Los Angeles rapper Kid Ink, who is a member of the 2012 XXL Freshman Class has also done a remix to this song called "Stank in My Blunt". Tyga did a remix called "Ready to Fuck" from his "Well Done 3" mixtape. Rapper Redman did a remix called "Smoke, Drank and Fuck," in which he kept part of the original chorus and Bangz's second verse from the original song. Rachel Sharkey is also featured in the music video.

== Chart performance ==
The song debuted at number 115 on the Hip Hop Digital Singles chart on the week ending of August 15, 2012. It peaked at number 28 on the Billboard Hot 100, becoming his first and only top 40 hit to date. The song has so far sold 1,000,000 copies in the United States alone.

== Track listing ==
Digital single

| No. | Title | Writer(s) | Producer(s) | Length |
|---|---|---|---|---|
| 1. | "Drank In My Cup" | Kirk Randle, Raul Gonzalez, Brandon Tillman | Sound M.O.B. | 3:52 |

Digital Remix EP

| No. | Title | Producer(s) | Length |
|---|---|---|---|
| 1. | "What Yo Name Iz?" | Sound M.O.B. | 3:25 |
| 2. | "Drank In My Cup Remix (featuring 2 Chainz & Juelz Santana)" | Sound M.O.B. | 5:32 |
| 3. | "Drank In My Cup (Pop Radio Remix)" | Sound M.O.B. | 3:12 |
| 4. | "Drank In My Cup (Instrumentals)" | Sound M.O.B. | 3:52 |

== Charts and certifications ==
=== Weekly charts ===
| Chart (2011–12) | Peak position |
|---|---|
| US Billboard Hot 100 | 28 |
| US Hot R&B/Hip-Hop Songs (Billboard) | 5 |
| US Hot Rap Songs (Billboard) | 1 |
| US Pop Airplay (Billboard) | 28 |
| US Rhythmic Airplay (Billboard) | 1 |

=== Certifications ===
| Region | Certification | Certified units/sales |
|---|---|---|
| New Zealand (RMNZ) | Gold | 15,000^{‡} |
| United States (RIAA) | Platinum | 1,000,000^{‡} |
^{‡} Sales+streaming figures based on certification alone.

=== Year-end charts ===
| Chart (2012) | Position |
|---|---|
| US Billboard Hot 100 | 78 |
| US Hot R&B/Hip-Hop Songs (Billboard) | 13 |
| US Rap Songs (Billboard) | 4 |
| US Rhythmic (Billboard) | 5 |

== Release history ==
Release dates and formats for "Honestly"
| Region | Date | Format | Label(s) | Ref. |
|---|---|---|---|---|
| United States | April 24, 2012 | Mainstream airplay | Warner Bros. | |
