= Still Pimping =

Studio album by Pimp C
- Released: July 12, 2011
- Recorded: 2006–2007
- Studios: M.A.D. Studios (Houston, Texas); Takeover Studios (Houston, Texas)
- Genre: Southern hip hop
- Length: 50:09
- Labels: J. Prince; Rap-A-Lot 4 Life; Fontana
- Producers: Steve Below; DJ B-Do; Beat Masta Wes; Big E; Cory Mo; Deja "The Great"; Mike Dean; Mr. Lee; V-Man; Joshua Moore

Pimp C chronology
The Naked Soul of Sweet Jones (2010)	Still Pimping (2011)	Long Live the Pimp (2015)

Professional ratings
Review scores
Source	Rating
AllMusic	3/5 stars
RapReviews	5/10
XXL	3/5

Still Pimping is the fourth solo studio album by American rapper Pimp C. It was released through J. Prince Entertainment, Rap-A-Lot Records, and Fontana Distribution on July 12, 2011, making it his second posthumous solo release. The album features guest appearances from Bun B, Da Underdawgz, Paul Wall, Slim Thug, Smoke D, Big K.R.I.T., Brooke Valentine, C-Bo, Cory Mo, Hezeleo, Killa Kyleon, Lil' Keke, Too $hort and Vicious.

== Track listing ==
No.	Title	Writer(s)	Producer(s)	Length
1.	"Pimptro"	C. Butler	Joshua Moore	0:32
2.	"Watch the Reaction" (featuring Lil' Keke & Killa Kyleon)	C. Butler; M. Edwards; K. Riley; S. Below	Steve Below	4:01
3.	"Grippin on the Wood" (featuring Bun B & Big K.R.I.T.)	C. Butler; B. Freeman; J. Scott; W. Harris	Beat Masta Wes; Joshua Moore (add.)	4:38
4.	"Finer Thangs" (featuring Slim Thug & Brooke Valentine)	C. Butler; S. Thomas; K. Brookes; D. Johnson	Deja "The Great"	4:08
5.	"I'm So Proud of Ya" (featuring Cory Mo & Hezeleo)	C. Butler; C. Moore	Cory Mo	3:31
6.	"Get Down" (featuring Smoke D)	C. Butler; S. Below	Steve Below	4:09
7.	"Bread Up" (featuring DJ B-Do & Paul Wall)	C. Butler; P. Slayton; B. Davis; M. Dean; C. Valach	Mike Dean; V-Man	4:27
8.	"Fuck Boy" (featuring Too $hort)	C. Butler; T. Shaw; S. Below	Steve Below	4:53
9.	"What U Workin Wit" (featuring Slim Thug & Bun B)	C. Butler; B. Freeman; S. Thomas; E. Tabasuri	Big E	4:21
10.	"Notes on Leases" (featuring Da Underdawgz)	C. Butler; T. McKinney; B. Davis; J. Ellis	DJ B-Do	3:07
11.	"Like Us" (featuring Smoke D, Vicious & C-Bo)	C. Butler; S. Below	Steve Below	4:39
12.	"Hold Up" (featuring Bun B & Paul Wall)	C. Butler; B. Freeman; P. Slayton; L. Williams Jr.	Mr. Lee	4:02
13.	"Gorillaz" (featuring Da Underdawgz & Bun B)	C. Butler; B. Freeman; T. McKinney; B. Davis	DJ B-Do	3:44
Total length:				50:09

== Charts ==
Chart (2011)	Peak position
US Billboard 200	72
US Top R&B/Hip-Hop Albums (Billboard)	15
US Top Rap Albums (Billboard)	8
US Independent Albums (Billboard)	15
