= Playa Made =

EP by Kirko Bangz
- Released: February 18, 2016
- Recorded: 2016
- Genre: Hip hop
- Length: 19:39
- Label: LMG; 300; Atlantic
- Producer: Albie Dickson; Trakksounds; Gluck; Chinky P; X.O; Sledgren; BDon

Kirko Bangz chronology
Fallin' Up Mix (2015)	Playa Made (2016)	Back Flossin (2016)

Playa Made is the second extended play by American recording artist Kirko Bangz. It was released on February 18, 2016 by LMG Music Group and 300 Entertainment. The EP has guest appearances from X.O and Jacquees and production from X.O, Albie Dickson, Sledgren, Chingy P, BDon, Gluck and Trakksounds. Kirko Bangz announced the EP's release on January 6 and that it would be followed by a tour.

== Track listing ==
No.	Title	Producer(s)	Length
1.	"Waitress"	X.O; Albie Dickson	3:27
2.	"Codeine"	Sledgren	3:12
3.	"Ain't a Pimp"	Gluck; BDon	2:28
4.	"Mileage" (featuring X.O)	X.O; Dickson	4:06
5.	"145" (featuring Jacquees)	X.O	3:13
6.	"Dat Texas"	Dickson; Trakksounds; Chingy P	3:53
Total length:			19:39
