= Trillionaire (Bun B song) =

2010 single by Bun B featuring T-Pain

Single by Bun B featuring T-Pain

from the album Trill OG
- Released: July 13, 2010
- Recorded: 2010
- Genre: Hip-hop
- Length: 4:07
- Label: Rap-A-Lot
- Songwriters: Bernard Freeman; Faheem Najm; Erik Ortiz; Kevin Crowe; Marcel Primous
- Producer: J.U.S.T.I.C.E. League

Bun B singles chronology
"Countin' Money" (2008)	"Trillionaire" (2010)	"What Up?" (2010)

T-Pain singles chronology
"All I Do Is Win" (2010)	"Trillionaire" (2010)	"Hey Baby (Drop It to the Floor)" (2010)

Music video
- "Trillionaire" on YouTube

"Trillionaire" is a song by American rapper Bun B featuring American singer T-Pain. The song served as the second single from his second album Trill OG. It is produced by J.U.S.T.I.C.E. League. The song peaked at number 77 on the Hot R&B/Hip-Hop Songs chart.

== Remixes ==
A chopped and screwed version of the track appears on the chopped and screwed version of Trill OG. Another remix which became popular, but is not official, features the vocals of the song placed on the instrumental version of Bun B's song "Countin' Money". Lil Wyte did a freestyle for his mixtape Wyte Christmas 2 (Let It SNO).

== Music video ==
The video was shot and released in August 2010. The music video was shot in Houston, Texas and shows the various shots of the Houston skyline.

== Chart performance ==
Chart (2013)	Peak position
US Hot R&B/Hip-Hop Songs (Billboard)	77
