= What Yo Name Iz? =

2011 single by Kirko Bangz

Single by Kirko Bangz

from the album Procrastination Kills 3
- Released: February 7, 2011
- Recorded: 2010
- Genre: Hip hop
- Length: 3:25
- Label: Warner Bros. Records
- Songwriters: Kirk Randle; Raul Gonzalez; Brandon Tillman
- Producer: Sound M.O.B.

Kirko Bangz singles chronology
"What Yo Name Iz?" (2011)	"Drank in My Cup" (2011)

"What Yo Name Iz?" is a song by American rapper Kirko Bangz, released as his debut single by Warner Records on February 7, 2011. The Houston-based production duo Sound M.O.B. produced the song, which was featured on his mixtape Procrastination Kills 3 (2011). It entered Billboard's Hot R&B/Hip Hop Songs chart, and peaked at number 41.

== Remix ==
"What Yo Name Iz? (Remix)"

Single by Kirko Bangz featuring Wale, Big Sean and Bun B
- Released: June 24, 2011
- Recorded: 2010
- Genre: Hip hop
- Length: 4:18
- Label: Warner Bros. Records
- Songwriters: Kirk Randle; Sean Anderson; Olubowale Akintimehin; Bernard Freeman; Raul Gonzalez; Brandon Tillman
- Producer: Sound M.O.B.

Kirko Bangz singles chronology
"What Yo Name Iz?" (2011)	"What Yo Name Iz? (Remix)" (2011)	"Drank in My Cup" (2011)

Wale singles chronology
"No Hands" (2010)	"What Yo Name Iz? (Remix)" (2011)	"That Way" (2011)

Big Sean singles chronology
"What Yo Name Iz? (Remix)" (2011)	"My Last" (2011)

Bun B singles chronology
"Welcome to My Hood (Remix)" (2011)	"What Yo Name Iz? (Remix)" (2011)	""Country Shit (Remix)"" (2011)

The official remix to What Yo Name Iz? features Wale, Big Sean, and Bun B. The remix was released on June 24, 2011, before the original version. Maxrank also made a remix for this song.

== Chart performance ==
"What Yo Name Iz?" was the first song by Kirko Bangz to chart on the billboard charts. It debuted at number 97 on the U.S. Billboard Hot R&B/Hip-Hop Songs on the week of October 23, 2010. It spent 27 weeks on the chart and peaked at number 41.

=== Charts ===
Chart (2010)	Peak position
US Billboard Hot R&B/Hip-Hop Songs	41
