= E.S.G. (rapper) =

American rapper (born 1973)

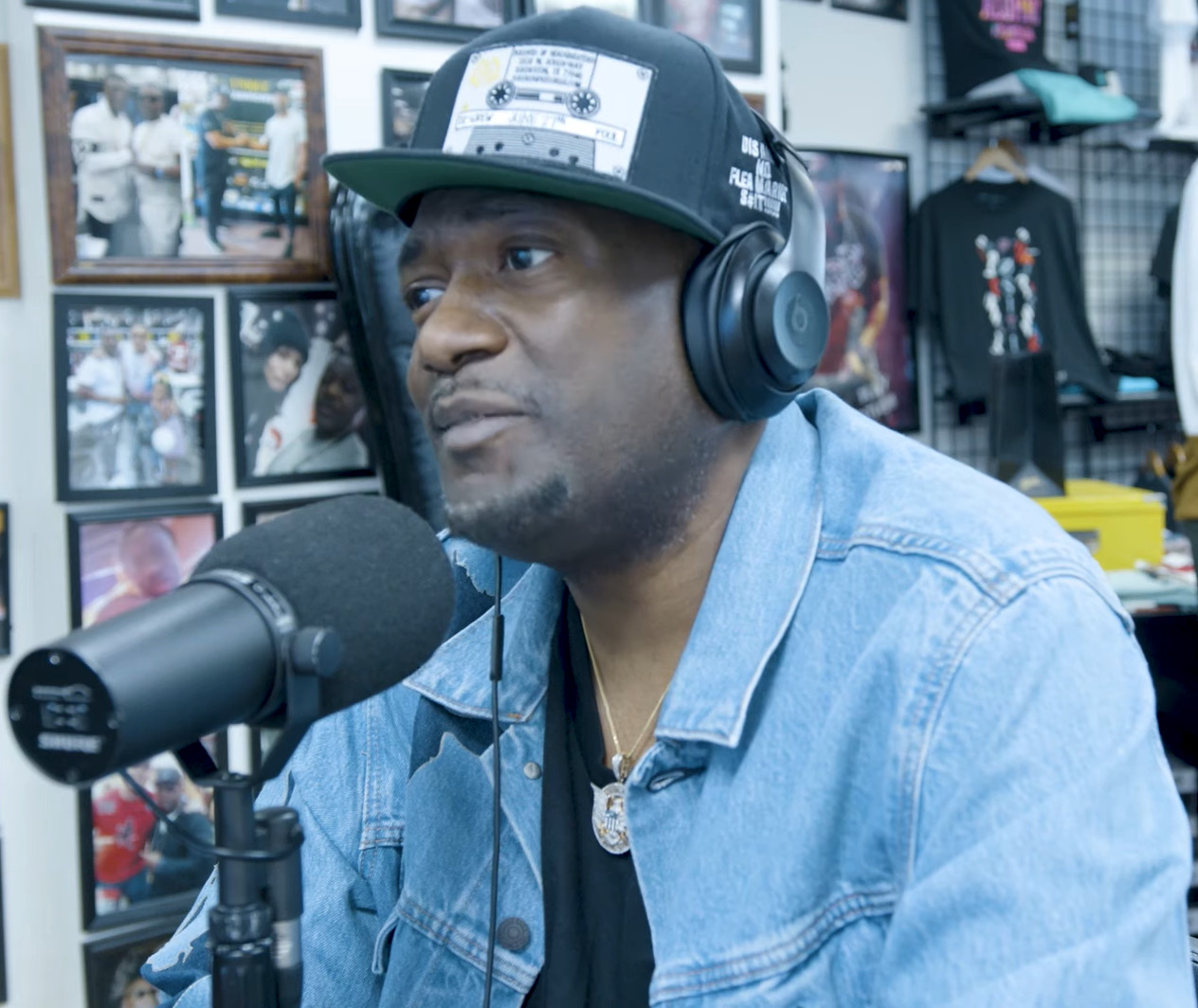
- E.S.G. in 2024

Background information
- Born: Cedric Dormaine Hill; June 3, 1974 (age 52); Bogalusa, Louisiana, U.S.
- Origin: Houston, Texas, U.S.
- Genres: Southern hip-hop; gangsta rap
- Occupation: Rapper
- Years active: 1993–present
- Labels: Perrion; Wreckshop; S.E.S.; E1 Music

Cedric Dormaine Hill (born June 3, 1974) better known by his stage name E.S.G. (which stands for Everyday Street Gangsta or Everyday Serving God) is an American rapper from Houston, Texas, and is a member of the Screwed Up Click.

== Career ==
Born on June 3, 1974, in Bogalusa, Louisiana, he moved to Houston in his mid-teens. He began rapping in 1991, but spent a year in prison for drug possession. After being released in late 1992, he resumed his rap career a year later. He joined the Screwed Up Click, headed by DJ Screw, who helped to popularize the "chopped and screwed" style of rap music. His debut album, Ocean of Funk, was released on February 1, 1994 under independent label Perrion Entertainment. It contained the popular single "Swangin' & Bangin'", which would later be remixed for his follow-up, Sailin' Da South, released in September 1995 under Priority Records; the album was released while E.S.G. was serving another jail sentence for a murder charge. He has released 13 more studio albums since then, ranging from 1998's Return of the Living Dead and the collaborative album, 2022's Dippin & Swangin with Mac Mall.

== Health problems ==
On July 1, 2022, E.S.G. was diagnosed with colon cancer. In June 2023, he was hit by a car after leaving a club, which ultimately led to him having his leg amputated.

== Discography ==
Studio albums

- Ocean of Funk (1994)
- Sailin' Da South (1995)
- Return of the Living Dead (1998)
- Shinin' n' Grindin' (1999)
- City Under Siege (2000)
- All American Gangsta (2004)
- Screwed Up Movement (2006)
- Digital Dope (2009)
- Everyday Street Gangsta (2009)
- Owner's Manual (2011)
- Kingish (2015)
- Trill Republik (2019)
- Kingish 2 (2022)
- The South Side Still Holdin: The Red Album (2022)
- Lost It All, Got It Back (2025)

Collaborative albums

- Boss Hogg Outlaws (with Slim Thug) (2001)
- Dippin & Swangin (with Mac Mall) (2022)

== See also ==
- Houston hip-hop
