= Kirko Bangz =

American rapper (born 1989)

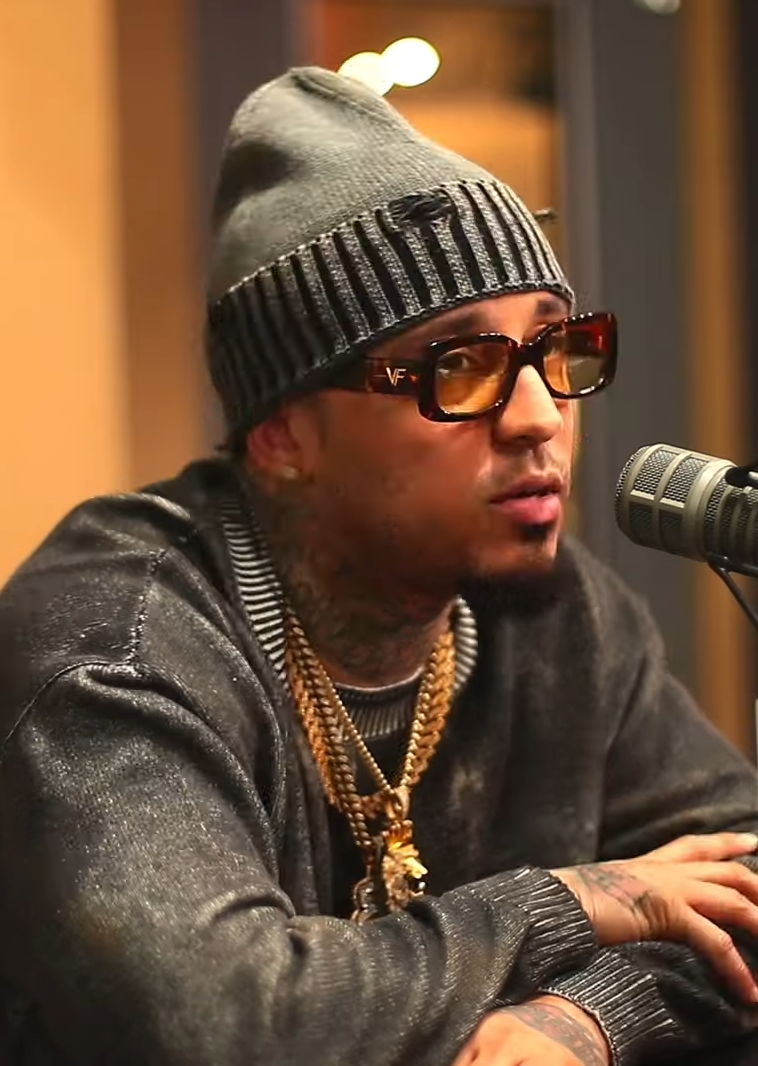
- Kirko Bangz in 2024

Background information
- Also known as: Kirk Ko Bangz
- Born: Kirk Jerel Randle; August 20, 1989 (age 37)
- Origin: Houston, Texas, U.S.
- Education: Prairie View A&M University (attended)
- Genres: Southern hip-hop; R&B
- Occupations: Rapper; singer; songwriter; record producer
- Years active: 2009–present
- Labels: AP; 300; Atlantic; Warner Bros.

Kirk Jerel Randle (born August 20, 1989), better known by his stage name Kirko Bangz, is an American rapper. He is best known for his 2011 single "Drank in My Cup", which peaked at number 28 on the US Billboard Hot 100 and received platinum certification by the Recording Industry Association of America (RIAA). His guest appearance on Meek Mill's 2012 single, "Young & Gettin' It", peaked at number 86. As his following releases have failed to chart, he has been regarded as a one-hit wonder.

== Early life ==
Kirko Bangz was born Kirk Jerel Randle on August 20, 1989, in Houston, Texas. Bangz started rapping at the age of fifteen, due in part to witnessing his mother struggle as a single parent; using his mother's pain as motivation. He graduated from North Shore High School in Houston and would later go on to attend Prairie View A&M University where he would major in communications.

== Career ==
=== 2009–2012: Career beginnings and mixtapes ===
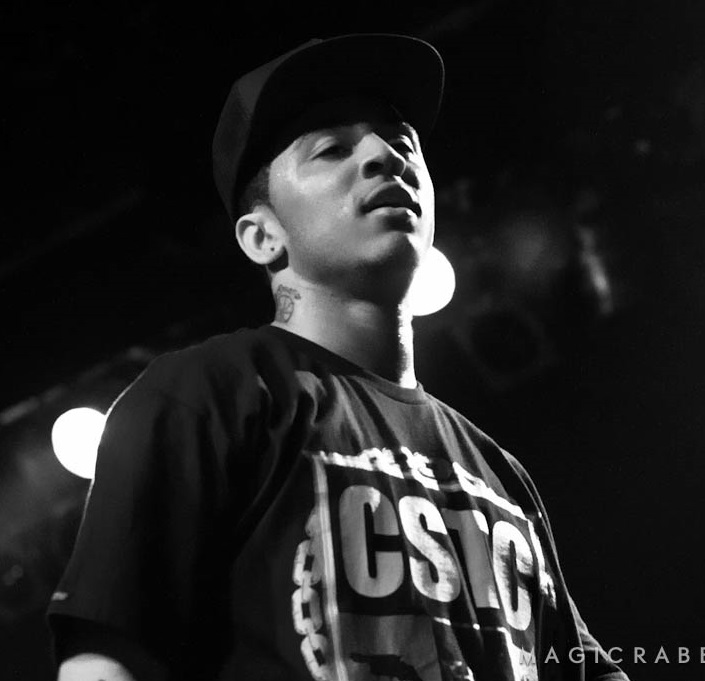
Kirko Bangz in 2012

At Prairie View, he was able to focus on his music. In 2009, he released his first mixtape, Procrastination Kills. He became acquainted with fellow student and soon-to-be manager, D Will, while studying. His stage name is a play on late singer Kurt Cobain's name. Bangz signed with Warner Records to release his first single, "What Yo Name Iz?", on February 7, 2011. According to Bangz himself, the song began as a freestyle. It peaked at number 41 on the Hot R&B/Hip-Hop Songs chart. A remix was released on June 24, 2011, and features Big Sean, Wale and Bun B. He released a mixtape shortly after on March 1, 2011, titled Procrastination Kills 3.

His second single, "Drank in My Cup", was released on September 16, 2011. During the week of February 25, 2012, the song debuted at number 96 on the Billboard Hot 100. It has since peaked at number 28 on the chart, as well as having peaked atop the Hot Rap Songs chart. The song spawned remixes and freestyles from hip-hop artists including J. Cole, 2 Chainz, Tyga, Bow Wow, Kid Ink, Chamillionaire and singer Trey Songz. Bangz released the mixtape Procrastination Kills 4 on September 4, 2012. His single "Keep It Trill" was released on November 30, 2012.

=== 2013–present: Atlantic Records and 300 Entertainment ===
On March 26, 2013, it was announced that Bangz would be a part of XXL's 2013 Freshman Class. Three days later, he announced the title of his debut album: Bigger Than Me.

On July 4, 2013, Bangz announced that he would release another mixtape, Progression 3 on August 1, 2013, prior to his debut album. However he would announce that it would be pushed back a week later. The mixtape was released on August 12, 2013. Guest appearances came from Wale, Nipsey Hussle, French Montana, Z-Ro, Paul Wall, YG and Slim Thug, among others. Production was handled by K.E. on the Track, DJ Mustard and Jahlil Beats, among others.

He was then moved to Atlantic Records, another subsidiarity of Warner Music Group. Then on January 28, 2014, Bangz released the single "Hoe", featuring YG and Yo Gotti, which was intended to lead his major label debut album. From March 6 to April 17, 2014, Kirko Bangz went on The Trillest concert tour which was co-headlined by frequent collaborator Bun B.

On December 16, 2014, Bangz released the Progression V: Young Texas Playa mixtape, which was produced primarily by Austinite, Kydd Jones and Sound M.O.B. (who produced Kirko's previous hit "Drank in My Cup"); the mixtape featured artists such as fellow Texas natives Bun B and Riff Raff.

On July 21, 2015, it was announced that Bangz signed with 300 Entertainment. Although he released several singles to promote his debut album Bigger Than Me, it remains unreleased. Bangz stated in an interview that much of his unreleased material is owned by Warner Music Group, making him unable to release it.

On August 31, 2015, Bangz released his first extended play (EP), Fallin' Up Mix. On February 19, 2016, Bangz released his second EP, titled Playa Made. Then on August 26, 2016, Bangz released the mixtape Back Flossin'. On August 10, 2017, Bangz released an installment to his Progression series with Progression 17.

== Personal life ==
Kirko Bangz is of African American, Mexican and Dominican descent.

== Discography ==
- Playa Made (2016)
- Back Flossin (2016)
