= Sound M.O.B. =

Music production and songwriting duo

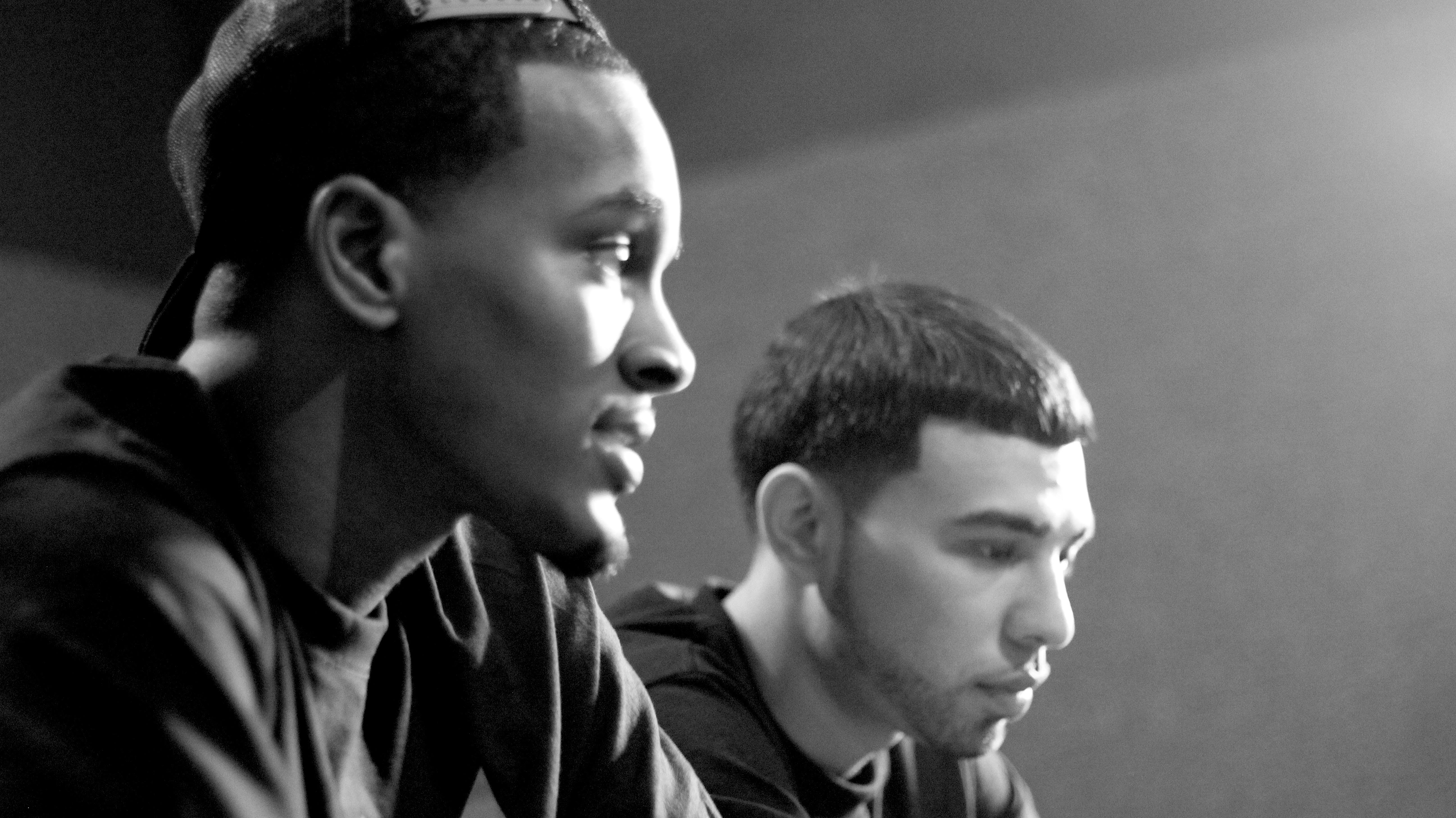
- Platinum-Selling Music Production Duo Sound M.O.B. Pyro (L) and DJ Ryu (R)

Background information
- Origin: Houston, Texas, U.S.
- Genres: Hip hop, R&B, trap
- Instruments: Pro Tools, FL Studio, drum machine, keyboards, piano, guitar
- Years active: 2006−present
- Label: Sound M.O.B. Productions LLC
- Members: DJ Ryu; Pyro
- Website: www.welcome2themob.com

Sound M.O.B. (The Sound Of Magnificently Orchestrated Beats) is a music production and songwriting duo consisting of Brandon Tillman, better known as Pyro, and Raul Gonzalez, also known as DJ Ryu. They are best known for producing Kirko Bangz's "Drank In My Cup" & Meek Mill’s "Litty" featuring Tory Lanez.

== History ==
Pyro and DJ Ryu both went to Barbara Jordan High School and even though record production wasn't a career at the school, they were both into production before they even met. They both met each other through a mutual friend and rapper by the name of Krucial and DJ Ryu was making beats for his songs. Krucial told Pyro to go to DJ Ryu's house where they made music together. Pyro went one day after school and he was surprised that DJ Ryu had a whole entire studio in his house. Pyro played DJ Ryu has beats and vice versa and they both realized they were making the same type of music, so they decided to form a production duo.

In 2007, Pyro and DJ Ryu entered the Red Bull Big Tune, a national twelve-city beat battle tour sponsored by Red Bull. At the time, DJ Ryu was nineteen and Pyro was twenty years old, and was before they really named themselves Sound M.O.B. The beat all of the competition and made it to the Semi-Finals before being defeated by S1. In 2008, they entered the competition for the second time as Sound M.O.B. and earned the title as the 2008 Red Bull Big Tune Champs of Houston, and went on to compete in the National Finals in New York City, which was broadcast on BET. In 2009, they first met rapper Kirko Bangz and began working together and exposing him as an artist working while working on his Procrastination Kills mixtape series.

One day, they got a call from Pleasure P, who was on tour with Young Money, informing them that he'd ended up on YM's tour bus and Lil Wayne, Nicki Minaj, and Drake recorded a song on one of their beats. Sound M.O.B. thought it could end up on their upcoming album We Are Young Money. Ryu and Pyro were both excited and were checking their phones almost every day to see if they'd get called about the song placement, but no one called in three months. Once they were called, they looked up track list online to see if they were on there and saw the name of their song, but with a name of a different producer. It happened that, they were told that the beat was theirs but, it was actually someone else's. It was heartbreaking for them.

Later that year, Sound M.O.B. were called by Bun B to work on his Trill OG album. They produced the bonus track "Real Live", which featured rappers Gator Mane and GLC. In early 2010, Sound MOB's got recognition with the song, "What Yo Name Iz?" by Kirko Bangz. With the success of the song, Bangz got signed to Warner Bros. Records. The song peaked at number 41 on the U.S. Billboard Hot R&B/Hip-Hop Songs chart, which led to a remix being released featuring Big Sean, Wale, and Bun B. On September 16, 2011, Kirko Bangz' released the second Sound M.O.B. produced single, "Drank In My Cup". During the week of February 25, 2012, the single debuted at number 96 on the Billboard Hot 100. It has since peaked at number 52 and at number 1 on the Heatseekers Songs chart. The song spawned four remixes featuring hip-hop artists J. Cole, 2 Chainz, Bow Wow, and Trey Songz.

== Production style ==
Ryu mostly uses melody-chord and an advanced piano player, and Pyro started off using Fruity Loops, with kicks and drums. DJ Ryu showed Pyro mostly everything about the piano. When DJ Ryu started off, he basically wanted to learn how to play the piano and try to hone his own skills on the piano side and drums kind of fell second nature, but once he started to work with Pyro, he showed how to use the drums, so they helped each other out in that sense.

== Selected discography ==
Production Credits
Song	Year	Artist(s)	Album	Co-Producer(s)	Label
"Swang Real Wide"	2009	Killa Kyleon, Z-RO	Natural Born Killa 2.0 Reloaded		
"Real Live"	2010	Bun B, Gator Mane, GLC	Trill OG		Rap-a-Lot Records
"What Yo Name Iz?"	2010	Kirko Bangz	Procrastination Kills 3		Warner Bros. Records
"Drank in My Cup"	2011	Kirko Bangz	Progression 2: A Young Texas Playa & Bigger Than Me		Warner
"Keep It Trill"	2012	Kirko Bangz	Bigger Than Me		LMG, Warner
"Walk On Green"	2012	Kirko Bangz, French Montana	Procrastination Kills 4		
"Sucka"	2013	August Alsina, Lloyd	The Product		Def Jam
"Love All Around Me"	2013	Casey Veggies, Rockie Fresh	Fresh Veggies		Peas N' Carrots International
"Tonight"	2013	Kirko Bangz	Progression III		
"Rain Down"	2013	Kirko Bangz, Ken Randle	Progression III		
"I Got A Friend"	2013	Kirko Bangz, Nipsey Hussle	Progression III		
"Essay"	2013	Kirko Bangz, G Haze	Progression III		
"Watch What I Do"	2014	Kirko Bangz	Progression V: Young Texas Playa		
"Break Yo Neck"	2014	Kirko Bangz, Bun B	Progression V: Young Texas Playa		
"Screaming"	2014	Kirko Bangz, James Bando	Progression V: Young Texas Playa	Burd & Keyz	
"Gangsta"	2014	Kirko Bangz, Ken Randle	Progression V: Young Texas Playa		
"In Her Lane"	2015	Kirko Bangz, Ty Dolla Sign	Bigger Than Me		300 Entertainment
"Back Flossin"	2016	Kirko Bangz	Back Flossin		300 Entertainment
"Love 2 Trap"	2016	Kirko Bangz	Back Flossin		300 Entertainment
"Aaryn's Interlude"	2016	Kirko Bangz	Back Flossin		300 Entertainment
"Litty"	2016	Meek Mill, Tory Lanez	DC4		Atlantic Records
"Feel Me"	2017	Tyga, Kanye West	TBA		Interscope Records
