= Lil' Keke discography =

This is the discography of American rapper Lil' Keke from Houston, Texas.

== Albums ==
=== Studio albums ===
Year	Title	Peak chart position				
Year	Title	Billboard 200	Top R&B/Hip-Hop Albums	Top Rap Albums	Independent Albums	Heatseekers Albums
1997	Don't Mess wit Texas: Released: June 17, 1997; Label: Jam Down Records	—	43	—	—	20
1998	The Commission: Released: March 24, 1998; Label: Jam Down Records, Breakaway Entertainment	176	37	—	—	13
1999	It Was All a Dream: Released: July 14, 1999; Label: Jam Down Records	—	51	—	—	17
2001	Peepin' in My Window: Released: July 17, 2001; Label: Pyrex Records	—	—	—	—	—
2001	Platinum in da Ghetto: Released: November 16, 2001; Label: In The Paint Records, Koch Records	122	22	—	3	1
2002	Birds Fly South: Released: May 28, 2002; Label: Commission Music Group	—	—	—	—	—
2003	Street Stories Vol. 1: Released: July 22, 2003; Label: Lookin Up Entertainment	—	—	—	—	—
2003	Changin' Lanes: Released: November 25, 2003; Label: Commission Muzic	—	—	—	—	—
2004	Currency: Released: October 26, 2004; Label: Avarice Entertainment	—	—	—	—	—
2005	Undaground All Stars: The Texas Line Up: Released: March 29, 2005; Label: Commission Music Group	—	—	—	—	—
2008	Loved by Few, Hated by Many: Released: November 18, 2008; Label: TTF Records, Universal Motown	120	22	8	—	4
2012	Heart of a Hustla: Released: October 22, 2012; Label: Hustle U.S.A., Seven 13 Music	—	57	—	—	39
2014	Money Don't Sleep: Released: July 13, 2014; Label: Swishahouse, Seven 13 Music	—	35	16	—	12
2016	Slfmade: Released: April 1, 2016; Label: Seven 13 Music	—	—	—	—	—
2018	Slfmade 2: Released: July 13, 2018; Label: Seven 13 Music, SoSouth	—	—	—	—	—
2020	Slfmade 3: Released: November 20, 2020; Label: Seven 13 Music, SoSouth	—	—	—	—	—
2022	Lgnd: Released: February 11, 2022; Label: Seven 13 Music, SoSouth	—	—	—	—	—
2023	25 Summers: Released: May 26, 2023; Label: Slfmade 713, SoSouth	—	—	—	—	—
2024	Can't Rain Forever: Released: May 3, 2024; Label: Slfmade 713, SoSouth	—	—	—	—	—
2025	Legend Hotel: Released: March 28, 2025; Label: Slfmade 713, SoSouth	—	—	—	—	—
2026	Streets Is My Witness: Released: March 20, 2026; Label: Slfmade 713, SoSouth	—	—	—	—	—

=== Other albums ===
Year	Title
2001	From Coast to Coast: Released: January 16, 2001; Label: Reliant Entertainment
2010	Still Standing: Released: April 27, 2010; Label: U Digg Music Group
2011	Ridin' with da Top Off Vol.1: Best of Both Worlds: Released: March 15, 2011; Label: Hustle Town
2011	Testimony: Released: November 15, 2011; Label: Hustle Town
2012	The Round Table: Released: April 20, 2012; Label: Seven 13 Music
2013	Top Features Vol.1: Released: June 27, 2013; Label: Seven 13 Music, SoSouth
2014	The Round Table Vol.2: Still Hungry: Released: February 17, 2014; Label: Seven 13 Music
2015	Top Features Vol.2: Released: January 21, 2015; Label: Seven 13 Music, SoSouth
2022	Lgnd Tlk, Vol. 1 (Spoken Word): Released: July 13, 2022; Label: Slfmade 713, SoSouth

=== Collaborative albums ===
Year	Title
1998	A Million Dollar$ Later (with Herschelwood Hardheadz): Released: September 1, 1998; Label: Jam Down Records, Breakaway Entertainment
2003	The Big Unit (with Slim Thug): Released: August 7, 2003; Label: Noddfactor Entertainment, Rap-A-Lot Records
2004	Wreckin' 2004 (with Big Hawk): Released: January 6, 2004; Label: Presidential Records
2004	Bad Company (with Shorty Mac): Released: March 12, 2004; Label: Bad Company Entertainment
2005	Str8 Out da Slums (with The Jacka): Released: June 21, 2005; Label: LGB
2005	Since the Gray Tapes Vol.3 (with Big Pokey): Released: November 17, 2005; Label: Screwed Up Click Entertainment
2006	If You Ain’t Hungry, Don't Come to the Table (with CMG): Released: June 1, 2006; Label: Commission Muzic
2008	Still Wreckin' (with Big Hawk): Released: October 9, 2008; Label: Presidential Records
2011	Standing Ovation (with Don Chief): Released: August 30, 2011; Label: Presidential Records
2014	From the Southside to WTX (with Rawsome Russ): Released: November 27, 2014; Label: Elder Entertainment
2020	Slab Talk (with Paul Wall): Released: June 5, 2020; Label: Seven 13 Music, Oiler Mobb Entertainment, SoSouth
2021	Don/Dawkins (with Bo Dawkins): Released: June 7, 2021; Label: Czar Records
2025	Double Cup, Pt. 2 (with Slim Thug): Released: October 24, 2025; Label: Hogg Life, Slfmade 713, SoSouth
2026	Streets Is My Witness, Pt. 2 (with Cal Wayne and AL-D*300): Released: May 8, 2026; Label: Slfmade 713, SoSouth

=== Compilations ===
Year	Title
1998	South Side (Remixes): Released: April 7, 1998; Label: So South
2004	Greatest Hits Vol.1: Released: June 1, 2004; Label: Presidential Records
2008	The Chronicles: Released: June 3, 2008; Label: Hustle Town
2009	The Chronicles Vol.2: Released: September 15, 2009; Label: Hustle Town
2010	The Don Ke Chronicles: Released: June 20, 2010; Label: Hustle Town

=== Official mixtapes ===
- 2006: Minor Setback for the Major Comeback (A Gangsta Grillz Extra) (Mixed by DJ Drama)
- 2006: The Album B4 the Album (3 Disc Set)
- 2007: Lil`Keke's Greatest Verses (Mixed by DJ LL & Desdem DJ's)
- 2007: The Cost of Living (with Yung Redd)
- 2007: Southern Elite (with 50-50 Twin & J-Stew, Mixed by DJ Sedd)
- 2008: Only the Strong Survive (Mixed by DJ Bigga Rankin)
- 2008: Seven 13 Hustlaz Vol.1: Da Movement
- 2008: South Side Still Holding (Mixed by DJ Mac Boo)
- 2009: Seven 13 Vol.2: Small Thangs 2 a Giant
- 2009: Universal Ghetto Pass - The Mixtape (Mixed by DJ Michael "5000" Watts)
- 2010: Addicted 2 Fame
- 2010: The Trilogy (Seven 13 Vol.3)
- 2010: Seven 13 Vol.4
- 2010: Texas Mafia (with Lil' Flip & Judge Dredd)
- 2011: Peepin in my Window 2K11: All Freestyles
- 2011: C.O.D. - Cash On Delivery (Seven 13 Vol.5)
- 2011: Fish Grease Mixtape
- 2012: Da Leak
- 2012: A.B.A. II (Album Before the Album II)
- 2013: 7.1.3D (Mixed by DJ Drop)
- 2014: A.B.A. 3 (Album Before the Album 3) (Mixed by DJ Michael 5000 Watts)
- 2016: 7Thirteen Tribute (Mixed by DJ Young Samm)
- 2016: A.B.A. IV (Album Before the Album IV)

== Singles ==
=== As lead artist ===
List of singles, with selected chart positions, showing year released and album name
Title	Year	Peak chart positions			Album
Title	Year	US	US R&B	US Rap	Album
"Southside"	1998	101	55	28	Don't Mess Wit Texas
"Chunk Up the Deuce"^{[A]} (featuring Paul Wall & Bun B)	2006	—	63	—	
"I'm a G" (featuring Birdman)	2007	—	—	—	Loved by Few, Hated by Many
"Fresher Than a Peppermint" (featuring Slim Thug, Paul Wall & Dorrough)	2010	—	—	—	Heart Of A Hustla
"—" denotes a recording that did not chart or was not released in that territory.

=== As featured artist ===
List of singles, with selected chart positions, showing year released and album name
Title	Year	Peak chart positions			Album
Title	Year	US	US R&B	US Rap	Album
"25 Lighters" (DJ DMD featuring Lil' Keke & Fat Pat)	1999	—	—	—	Twenty-Two: P.A. World Wide
"Ball-N' Parlay" (Big Pokey featuring Lil' Keke, Mr. 3-2 & Big Moe	1999	—	—	—	Hardest Pit In The Litter
"Bangin Screw" (Woss Ness featuring Big Pokey & Lil' Keke)	2000	—	—	—	Bangin Screw
"Draped Up" (Bun B featuring Lil' Keke)	2005	—	—	—	Trill
"Knockin' Doorz Down" (Pimp C featuring P.O.P & Lil' Keke)	2006	108	—	—	Pimpalation
"Break 'Em Off" (Paul Wall featuring Lil' Keke)	2006	72	58	21	Get Money, Stay True
"Diamonds Exposed" (Paul Wall featuring Lil' Keke & Chamillionaire)	2008	—	—	—	Blow One 2K8
"Do You Like" (Lady Royale featuring Lil' Keke)	2008	—	—	—	
"—" denotes a recording that did not chart or was not released in that territory.

=== Promotional singles ===
List of singles, with selected chart positions, showing year released and album name
Title	Year	Peak chart positions		Album
Title	Year	US	US R&B	Album
"Draped Up" (Remix) (Bun B featuring Lil' Keke, Slim Thug, Chamillionaire, Paul Wall, Mike Jones, Aztek, Lil' Flip & Z-Ro)	2007	—	45	Trill

== Guest appearances ==
List of non-single guest appearances, with other performing artists, showing year released and album name
Title	Year	Other performer(s)	Album
"Mind At Ease"	1996	Al-D, A.C.T., Shorty Mac	Mind At Ease
"Can I Get A Lil Luv"	1997	Madd Hatta, Big Mello, Fat Pat, Heather Barrett	The PH Factor
"If The World Was"	1997	Point Blank, DJ Screw	N-Tha-Do
"Heart Of A Hustler"	1998	Dead End Alliance, Fat Pat, Kay-Kay, Big Hawk, DJ Screw, Mike D	Screwed For Life
"25 Lighterz"	1998	Dead End Alliance, Big Pokey, Big Moe	Screwed For Life
"Dead End Niggaz"	1998	Dead End Alliance, Big Moe, Big Pokey	Screwed For Life
"Turnin' Lane"	1998	Dead End Alliance, Mike D	Screwed For Life
"It Don't Stop It Don't Quit"	1998	Dead End Alliance, Mike D, Mr. 3-2	Screwed For Life
"Too Hott"	1998	Mr. 3–2, C-Note, Lil' O, Al-D, Clay-Doe, Big Pokey, Will-Lean, Mafio, Big Hawk, Big Moe, Ronnie Spencer	Southside Playaz: You Gottus Fuxxed Up
"Game's Strange"	1998	Mr. 3–2, Lil Flea, K.B. Da Kidnappa, Papa Reu	Southside Playaz: You Gottus Fuxxed Up
"24-7-365"	1998	FWC	Organized Crime
"Bang & Tint"	1998	20-2-Life	Confessions
"Only Way 2 Shine"	1999	Sam Houston Boyz	The Only Way 2 Shine
"Fo' Sheazy"	1999	PSK-13	Pay Like You Weigh
"Young Killaz On Da Rise (Remix)"	1999	Endo, Yungstar	One World One Chance
"Down N H-Town (Remix)"	2000	Big Hawk, Mike D, Big Pokey	Under Hawk's Wings
"I Can Make You Dance"	2000	Big Hawk, E.S.G., C-Note	Under Hawk's Wings
"Hell Razor"	2000	DJ Screw, Lil' O, Clay-Doe, Mike D, Big Pokey, Mr. 3–2, C-Note, Big Moe	Southside Playaz: Street Game
"Bangin Screw"	2000	Woss Ness, Big Pokey	Bangin Screw
"Commission"	2000	Mobb Figgaz	Shunny Pooh Presents: 3rd Coast's Finest Volume 1
"Show Up"	2000	Candyman	Makin' Deals Of A Lifetime
"Still I Shine"	2000	Abstraq, Tigga Man	Grindology 101
"Diamonds & Pearls"	2000	Papa Reu	Xcuse Me!
"Ballin' Outta Control"	2001	C-Nile, Big Pokey, Z-Ro	The Golden Child
"Down South We Mob"	2001	R.W.O., H.A.W.K.	Book Of Game: Chapter 1
"Nothing But Love"	2001	—N/a	ScrewHeads: Forever And A Day
"S.U.C. Fo Life"	2002	Big Jut, Young Star	Screwed Up Fo Life
"Hurtin Inside"	2002	Al-D	4 Da Green
"Down Here"	2002	E.S.G., Slim Thug	Boss Hogg Outlaws
"Down N H-Town"	2002	Tow Down, C-Note	Chicken Fried Steak
"Still Pimpin Pens"	2003	Lucky Luciano	You Already Know
"Texas Boy"	2004	Big Lurch	It's All Bad
"Johnny Dang's Watch Froze"	2007	Paul Wall, Fat Joe, Slim Thug	
"Gettin' Money"	2007	DJ Drama, Paul Wall, Slim Thug, Killa Kyleon	
"Won't Let You Down (Texas Takeover Remix)"	2007	Chamillionaire, Slim Thug, Mike Jones, Trae, Paul Wall, UGK, Z-Ro	
"Miles Away"	2008	Warren G, Paul Wall	
"Welcome 2 Houston"	2009	Slim Thug, Chamillionaire, Paul Wall, Mike Jones, UGK, Z-Ro, Trae, Rob G, Lil' O, Big Pokey, Mike D, Yung Redd	
"Between Me And U"	2010	2 Chainz	
"Come With Me"	2012	2win, Paul Wall	
"Flossin'"	2012	Flatline	Respect My Gangsta
"Bread Money"	2013	Big Doughski G	Twenty-One Grams
"Swangin" (Remix)	2013	Stalley, Trae Tha Truth, Bun B, Chamillionaire, E.S.G.	
"H-Town Anthem"	2014	Point Blank, Z-Ro, Avery	No Money, No Reason
