= Mr. 3-2 =

American rapper from Houston, TX

3-2

Background information
- Also known as: Mr 3-2, Tre Deuce, Fat Domino, Tha G-O-V, Pimpin Chris, The Wicked Buddah Baby, Lord Tre Duece, Da Boss Man
- Born: Christopher Joul Barrier; July 11, 1972; Yakima, Washington, U.S.
- Origin: Houston, Texas, U.S.
- Died: November 10, 2016 (aged 44) Houston, Texas, U.S.
- Genres: Hip hop
- Occupation: Rapper
- Years active: 1988–2016
- Labels: Rap-A-Lot Records; N Yo Face Records; Street Game Records; Down South Records
- Formerly of: Blac Monks; Convicts; Screwed Up Click; Southside Playaz

Christopher Juel Barriere (July 11, 1972 – November 10, 2016), professionally known as 3-2, was an American rapper and a member of southern hip hop groups Convicts, Blac Monks, Southside Playaz and Screwed Up Click. He achieved success through his association with Rap-A-Lot Records. He was also known to be an influence on Snoop Dogg when he was just starting and became affiliated with Death Row Records in the early 1990’s with Convicts partner Big Mike. Barriere was fatally shot in the head at a gas station in Houston.

== Discography ==
=== Studio albums ===
Title	Release	Peak chart positions	
Title	Release	US R&B	US Heat
The Wicked Buddah Baby	Released: 1996; Label: Rap-A-Lot, Noo Trybe	28	13
The Governor	Released: 2001; Label: N Yo Face	—	—
On Probation	Released: 2005; Label: Street Game	—	—
Over the Law	Released: 2005; Label: Street Game	—	—
Family Ties	Released: 2006; Label: Street Game, Pham Ent.	—	—
Fatt Domino	Released: 2008; Label: Down South	—	—
Verbal Assault	Released: 2009; Label: Playamade Productions	—	—

=== Collaboration albums ===
Title	Release	Peak chart positions
Title	Release	US R&B
Convicts with Convicts	Released: 1991; Label: Rap-A-Lot	52
Secrets of the Hidden Temple with Blac Monks	Released: 1994; Label: Rap-A-Lot	65
No Mercy with Blac Monks	Released: 1998; Label: Rap-A-Lot	74
You Gottus Fuxxed Up with Southside Playaz	Released: 1998; Label: Laftex Records	—
Street Game with Southside Playaz	Released: 2000; Label: Laftex Records	91
Str'8 Drop with Timebomb	Released: 2012; Label: Timebomb Entertainment	—

=== Guest appearances ===
Title	Release	Other artist(s)	Album
"South Park Coalition"	1991	The Terrorists (Dope E, Egypt E), Ganksta N-I-P, Point Blank	Terror Strikes: Always Bizness, Never Personal
"Aggravated"	1992	Point Blank	Prone to Bad Dreams
"Buck Em Down"	1993	DMG, Scarface, Big Mike, 5th Ward Boyz, 2 Low	Rigormortiz
"Da Hood"	1993	2 Low	Funky Lil Brotha
"Straight Gangstaism"	1993	Geto Boys	Till Death Do Us Part
"Bring It On"	1993	Geto Boys, 5th Ward Boyz, Ganksta N-I-P, Seagram, Odd Squad, Big Mello, DMG	Till Death Do Us Part
"Gang Stories"	1994	South Central Cartel, Big Mike	'N Gatz We Truss
"Stoned Junkee"	1994	UGK	Super Tight
"Pussy Got Me Dizzy"	1994	UGK	Super Tight
"Came Na Gedown"	1994	Odd Squad, Scarface, 2 Low	Fadanuf Fa Erybody!!
"Fire"	1994	Big Mike	Somethin' Serious
"Pass da Dank"	1995	South Central Cartel, Ant Banks, Spice 1, Mr. Wesside	Murder Squad Nationwide
"One Day"	1996	UGK, Ronnie Spencer	Ridin' Dirty
"Touched"	1996	UGK	Ridin' Dirty
"Something About the Southside"	1997	Lil' Keke	Don't Mess wit Texas
"Jus Ride"	1998	Fat Pat, Double D, Pymp Tyte	Throwed in da Game
"2 Real"	1998	Scarface, UGK	My Homies
"Turnin' Lane (Remix)"	1998	Dead End Alliance, Lil' Keke, Mike D	Screwed for Life
"Money & Da Power"	1998	Dead End Alliance, E.S.G.	Screwed for Life
"Nineteen Ninety Grind"	1999	C-Note, Big Kool	Third Coast Born
"Constant Struggle"	1999	Sean Pymp, Tyte Eyes, D-Reck, Ronnie Spencer	All N' Yo Face
"Outta Control"	1999	Big Steve, Big Mello	My Testimony and Done Deal
"Lock N Da Game"	1999	Lil' Troy	Sittin' Fat Down South
"Playas Get Chose"	1999	Lil' O, Big Moe, Big Hawk, Slikk Breeze	Blood Money and Da Fat Rat wit da Cheeze
"World Wide Playaz"	1999	Lil' Keke, South Park Mexican	It Was All a Dream
"Ball'n-Parlay"	1999	Big Pokey, Big Moe, Lil' Keke	Hardest Pit in the Litter
"Gage Play"	1999	Big Pokey, Big Rue	Hardest Pit in the Litter
"Can't Stop"	2000	Dat Boy Grace	From Crumbs to Bricks
"Keep My Name out Yo Mouth"	2000	Big Pokey, Will-Lean, Mike D, Mafia Mike, Chris Ward	D-Game 2000
"Choo Choo"	2000	Lil' O, Mike D, Big Hawk	Da Fat Rat wit da Cheeze
"High With Tha Blanksta"	2000	Point Blank, Z-Ro, Big Moe, C-Loc, Lil Flex, PSK-13	Bad Newz Travels Fast
"What's Happen"	2000	Big Steve, Big Hawk	Back To Back Hits and Under Hawk's Wings
"Hustling All I Can Do"	2000	Z-Ro, Point Blank	Z-Ro vs. the World
"Love 2 Make $"	2001	Lil' Keke	Peepin' in My Window
"Life"	2002	Z-Ro	Screwed Up Click Representa
"It's About to Go Down"	2002	Big Moe, Lil' Flip, Noke D, D Gotti, Toon	Purple World
"Move Around"	2003	Big Moe, Noke D	Moe Life...
"Playas Still Get Chose"	2003	Lil' O	Food on tha Table
"Screwed Up Click"	2004	Trae tha Truth, Big Hawk	Same Thing Different Day
"The Way I Live"	2008	Big Pokey, Big Mike	Evacuation Notice
"Kill"	2008	Lil' Keke, Big Hawk, Kevo	Still Wreckin'
"First Class"	2008	Lil' Keke, Big Hawk, Big Pokey	Still Wreckin'
"It's Like That"	2011	Dat Boy Grace	Rollin N Groovin
"Don't Fuxx Wit.."	2011	Dat Boy Grace	Rollin N Groovin
"Time Fa Change"	2011	Dat Boy Grace	Rollin N Groovin
"These Streets"	2021	Z-Ro, Mike D	2 The Hardway

== See also ==
- List of murdered hip hop musicians
