= The Wicked Buddah Baby =

Studio album by Mr. 3-2
- Released: September 17, 1996
- Recorded: 1995–96
- Studios: Jungle Style (Houston, TX); Temple Studios (Houston, TX); The Enterprise
- Genre: Hip hop
- Length: 54:30
- Labels: Rap-A-Lot; Noo Trybe
- Producers: J. Prince (exec.); John Bido (also exec.); Mike Dean; N.O. Joe; Mr. 3-2; Big Swift; Crazy C; Freddie Young; Troy "Pee Wee" Clark

Mr. 3-2 chronology
Secrets of the Hidden Temple (1994)	The Wicked Buddah Baby (1996)	No Mercy (1998)

Professional ratings
Review scores
Source	Rating
AllMusic	3/5 stars
The Source	3/5 stars

The Wicked Buddah Baby is the debut solo studio album by American rapper Mr. 3-2, a member of Blac Monks and Screwed Up Click, from Houston, Texas. It was released on September 17, 1996, via Rap-A-Lot Records and Noo Trybe Records. It features guest appearances from 8Ball & MJG, Sonia Moore, Southside Playaz, Too Short and UGK. The album peaked at number 28 on the US Billboard Top R&B/Hip-Hop Albums chart and number 13 on the Heatseekers Albums chart.

== Track listing ==
No.	Title	Producer(s)	Length
1.	"Buddah Baby Intro"	John Bido; Mike Dean (co.)	2:22
2.	"Coming Down" (featuring Sonia Moore)	N.O. Joe	4:00
3.	"Dressed 2 Kill"	John Bido; Mike Dean (co.)	5:03
4.	"My Sweet Trick"	John Bido; Mike Dean (co.)	5:40
5.	"Them Against Me"	John Bido; Mike Dean (co.)	4:48
6.	"Welcome to the Slab"	N.O. Joe	3:40
7.	"Turning Lane" (featuring Southside Playaz)	Mike Dean	4:06
8.	"Kickin Flowz"	Troy "Pee Wee" Clark	3:53
9.	"Hit the Highway" (featuring Too $hort, 8Ball & MJG)	Mr. 3-2	5:42
10.	"You Wanna Ride" (featuring UGK)	Big Swift	4:38
11.	"Buddah Nature" (Remix)	Crazy C	4:08
12.	"Buddah Baby Outro"	Freddie Young	6:30
Total length:			54:30

Sampled credits

- "Dressed 2 Kill" contains elements from "The Memory" by Roy Ayers Ubiquity
- "My Sweet Trick" contains elements from "Juicy Fruit" by Mtume and "Love T.K.O." by Teddy Pendergrass
- "Them Against Me" contains elements from "Electric Lady" by Con Funk Shun
- "Hit the Highway" contains elements from "Just Roll" by Fabu
- DJ Screw talks on "Buddah Baby Outro"

== Personnel ==
- Christopher Juel Barriere – main artist, producer (track 9), engineering, mixing, mastering, production coordinator, art design
- Sonia Moore – featured artist (track 2)
- Southside Playaz – featured artists (track 7)
- Marlon Jermaine Goodwin – featured artist (track 9)
- Premro Smith – featured artist (track 9)
- Todd Anthony Shaw – featured artist (track 9)
- Bernard Freeman – featured artist (track 10)
- Chad Lamont Butler – featured artist (track 10)
- John Okuribido – producer (tracks: 1, 3–5), engineering, mixing, mastering, production coordinator, art design, executive producer, management
- Michael George Dean – producer (track 7), co-producer (tracks: 1, 3–5), engineering, mixing, mastering
- Joseph Johnson – producer (tracks: 2, 6)
- Troy Clark – producer (track 8), engineering
- John "Swift" Catalon – producer (track 10)
- Simon Cullins – producer (track 11)
- Freddie Young – producer (track 12)
- James A. Smith – executive producer
- Jeff Griffin – engineering
- Anthony Valcic – mastering
- Pen & Pixel – art direction

== Charts ==
Chart (1996)	Peak position
US Top R&B/Hip-Hop Albums (Billboard)	28
US Heatseekers Albums (Billboard)	13
