= Endangered Species (H.A.W.K. album) =

Studio album by Big Hawk
- Released: May 15, 2007 (US); June 30, 2007 (UK)
- Recorded: 2005–2006
- Studios: Red Light Recording (Houston, TX); The Laab (Houston, TX)
- Genre: Southern hip-hop
- Label: Ghetto Dreams Entertainment
- Producers: Big Hawk (exec.); Meshah Hawkins (exec.); Derek "Grizz" Edwards; Chaney Welsh; Shorty P

Big Hawk chronology
Wreckin' 2004 (2004)	Endangered Species (2007)	Still Wreckin' (2008)

Endangered Species is the third and final solo studio album by American rapper Big Hawk from Houston, Texas. It was released posthumously, on May 15, 2007 through Ghetto Dreams Entertainment. It features guest appearances from Big Pokey, Chamillionaire, Chris Ward, C-Note, Devin the Dude, E. Martin, Fat Pat, Jimmy D of 713, Lil' Keke, Lil' O, Mike D, Paul Wall, Scooby of Grit Boys, Slim Thug, Trae tha Truth & Wayne "PZ" Perry.

== Track listing ==
No.	Title	Producer(s)	Length
1.	"Intro"	Chaney Welsh; Derek "Grizz" Edwards	2:02
2.	"Let's Get It On" (featuring Slim Thug, Scooby & Paul Wall)	Chaney Welsh; Derek "Grizz" Edwards	5:24
3.	"I Like That Girl" (featuring Scooby, Mike D & Lil' O)	Derek "Grizz" Edwards	3:51
4.	"Throwed In Da Game" (featuring Fat Pat, Lil' Keke, Big Pokey & C-Note)	Shorty P; Derek "Grizz" Edwards	5:26
5.	"Endangered Species Pt. 1"		1:15
6.	"Ain't Having It" (featuring Chris Ward)	Derek "Grizz" Edwards	3:22
7.	"Yall Don't Know" (featuring Jimmy D)	Shorty P	4:30
8.	"Coming Home" (featuring Devin the Dude, Chamillionaire & Trae)	Chaney Welsh; Derek "Grizz" Edwards	3:39
9.	"H-Town Stomp"	Derek "Grizz" Edwards	4:59
10.	"Endangered Species Pt. 2"		1:41
11.	"Just Need the Air" (featuring Wayne "PZ" Perry & E. Martin)	Derek "Grizz" Edwards	4:21
12.	"Outro"	Chaney Welsh; Derek "Grizz" Edwards	1:18

== Charts ==
Chart (2007)	Peak position
US Top R&B/Hip-Hop Albums (Billboard)	54
US Top Rap Albums (Billboard)	24
