= Evacuation Notice =

Studio album by Big Pokey
- Released: July 22, 2008
- Genre: Southern hip hop
- Label: Koch Records; Doc Music Group
- Producer: Michael Green (exec.); Big Pokey (exec.); Sean Blaze; Beanz & Kornbread; Big Swift; Derek "Grizz" Edwards; Eno; G Rut; GL Productions; Jhiame; Mr. Lee; Papa Reu; Sam Sneed; Tomar Williams

Big Pokey chronology
| Da Sky's Da Limit (2002) | Evacuation Notice (2008) | Sensei (2021) |

Professional ratings
Review scores
| Source | Rating |
|---|---|
| RapReviews | 6.5/10 |

Evacuation Notice is the fourth solo studio album by American rapper Big Pokey, from Houston, Texas. It was released on July 22, 2008, through Koch Records. It features guest appearances from Big Mike, Lil' Keke, Lil' O, Papa Reu, Paul Wall, Slim Thug and Mobstyle Crew among others. The album peaked at number 75 on the US Billboard Top R&B/Hip-Hop Albums chart.

== Critical reception ==
AllMusic wrote that the album "sees the H-Town heavyweight showing versatility over gutter gangsta tracks, R&B-tinged slow jams, and syrupy slow Texas funk."

== Track listing ==
| No. | Title | Producer(s) | Length |
|---|---|---|---|
| 1. | "9 Times Outta of 10" (featuring Papa Reu) | Papa Reu | 4:06 |
| 2. | "Let dem Boys Know" (featuring Lil' Keke & Paul Wall) | Beanz N Kornbread | 4:42 |
| 3. | "The Way I Live" (featuring Mr. 3-2 & Big Mike) | Sean Blaze | 3:33 |
| 4. | "Boss Hogg on Candy" (featuring Slim Thug) | Tomar Williams | 5:08 |
| 5. | "One Night Stand" (featuring Lil' O) | Sean Blaze | 4:13 |
| 6. | "Grit Grind" (featuring Wood & Chris Ward) | Big Swift | 4:25 |
| 7. | "Mobb Niggaz" (featuring D-One & Chris Ward) | Derek "Grizz" Edwards | 4:20 |
| 8. | "I'm from the South" (featuring Mr. Lee) | Mr. Lee | 4:01 |
| 9. | "U Can Hate" (featuring Chris Ward & Slim Thug) | GL Productions | 5:01 |
| 10. | "I'm a Gangsta" (featuring Grim Reaper & Mack Biggers) | Sam Sneed | 3:21 |
| 11. | "I Mean I'm" (featuring A-3) | G Rut | 4:42 |
| 12. | "Ghetto Star" (featuring Jhiame) | Da Assassinz | 4:19 |

== Charts ==
| Chart (2008) | Peak position |
|---|---|
| US Top R&B/Hip-Hop Albums (Billboard) | 75 |
