= Under Hawk's Wings =

Under H.A.W.K.'s Wings

Studio album by Big Hawk
- Released: January 4, 2000
- Recorded: 1997–1999
- Studio: Ghetto Dreamz (Houston, TX)
- Genre: Southern rap
- Length: 66:52
- Label: Dead End
- Producers: Sean "Solo" Jemison; Harvey Luv; Slack; Jhiame; Big Swift; Jermaine "Mr. Optimo" Chretien; Melvin King; Crank

Big Hawk chronology
Under H.A.W.K.'s Wings (2000)	HAWK (2001)

Singles from Under Hawk's Wings
- 1. "Haters Luv It (When You're Down)" Released: 2000

DJ Screw and the Screwed Up Click Presents Under H.A.W.K.'s Wings is the debut studio album by American rapper Big Hawk from Houston, Texas. It was released on January 4, 2000 via Dead End. The album peaked at #68 on the US Billboard Top R&B/Hip-Hop Albums chart.

== Track listing ==
No.	Title	Producer(s)	Length
1.	"Down N H-Town (Remix)" (featuring Big Pokey, Mike D & Lil' Keke)	D.J. Harvee Luv	5:01
2.	"Haters Luv It (When You're Down)" (featuring Shonda Skyy)	Sean "Solo" Jemison	4:35
3.	"World Come 2 an End" (featuring Godfather & Chris Ward)	Slack	4:55
4.	"Roll Up a Blunt" (featuring Big Moe, Big Pokey, Mike D & Slikk Breeze)	Jhiame	4:23
5.	"Do You Luv It" (featuring D Gotti & Will-Lean)	Big Swift	4:15
6.	"H.A.W.K." (featuring Big Moe & Kendra Brown)	D.J. Harvee Luv	4:14
7.	"That's Me" (featuring Lil' O, Mike D & Chris Ward)	Sean "Solo" Jemison	4:52
8.	"I Can Make You Dance" (featuring E.S.G., Lil' Keke, DJ Screw & C-Note)	Jhiame	4:08
9.	"Heart of a Hustler" (featuring Lil' Keke, Fat Pat, Mike D & Kay-K)	Sean "Solo" Jemison	5:16
10.	"Million Dollar Block" (featuring Lil' O & D Gotti)	Big Swift	3:45
11.	"What's Happenin' Out Here" (featuring Mr. 3-2 & Big Steve)	Melvin King	4:40
12.	"Cheddar" (featuring Big Pokey, Mr. 3-2 & Clay Doe)	Crank	4:27
13.	"Only Tyme Will Tale" (featuring Dead End B.G.)	Jermaine "Mr. Optimo" Chretien	3:22
14.	"Somebody Say Oh Yeah!" (featuring Chris Ward, Mike D, Lil' Flip, & Big Pokey)	Slack	4:34
15.	"Under H.A.W.K.'z Wingz" (featuring Ronnie Spencer, Shonda Skyy & Robbie Smith)	Jermaine "Mr. Optimo" Chretien	4:26
Total length:			1:06:52

== Chart positions ==
Chart (2000)	Peak position
US Top R&B/Hip-Hop Albums (Billboard)	68
US Independent Albums (Billboard)	30
US Heatseekers Albums (Billboard)	33
