= Hardest Pit in the Litter =

Studio album by Big Pokey
- Released: May 18, 1999
- Recorded: 1999
- Studio: Uptown Recording Studio (Houston, TX)
- Genre: Southern hip-hop
- Length: 68:05
- Label: Chevis Entertainment
- Producers: Paul Chevis (exec.); Harvey Luv; Jhiame; Big Swift; Reeko; E-Man; Saddam; Bigg Tyme; Chicken Hawk; Double D; Melvin

Big Pokey chronology
Hardest Pit in the Litter (1999)	D-Game 2000 (2000)

Professional ratings
Review scores
Source	Rating
AllMusic	2.5/5 stars

Hardest Pit in the Litter is the debut studio album by American rapper Big Pokey, from Houston, Texas. It was released on May 18, 1999, via Chevis Entertainment. The album peaked at No. 72 on the US Billboard Top R&B/Hip-Hop Albums chart.

== Track listing ==
No.	Title	Producer(s)	Length
1.	"Intro"		1:28
2.	"Hardest Pit"	Jhiame	4:02
3.	"Range Rover" (featuring Big Steve)	D.J. Harvee Luv	4:26
4.	"Trippin Me Out" (featuring Snow & Ronnie Spencer)	Jhiame	4:09
5.	"Y.S.P." (featuring Mr. Sweets & Chris Ward)	Big Swift	4:25
6.	"Ball'n-Parlay" (featuring Big Moe, 3-2 & Lil' Keke)	Reeko	4:40
7.	"Who Dat Talking Down" (featuring Big Steve & Big-E)	D.J. Harvee Luv	3:50
8.	"Repatation"	E-Man	2:58
9.	"It's Like That? (June 27th Remix)" (featuring Lil' Keke)	Saddam	4:23
10.	"Freestyle Pro"	Big Swift	3:55
11.	"Leave Us Alone" (featuring R.W.O.)	Bigg Tyme	4:36
12.	"Gage Play" (featuring 3-2 & Big Rue)	D.J. Harvee Luv	4:09
13.	"Shady Game" (featuring Chris Ward & Lil' O)	Reeko	5:01
14.	"Heavy Weighters" (featuring Big Hawk)	D.J. Harvee Luv	4:22
15.	"All In!"	Chicken Hawk	5:07
16.	"Dog Proof" (featuring C-Note & Will-Lean)	Double D	4:47
17.	"Hands Up" (featuring Big Hawk & Chris Ward)	Melvin	6:48
Total length:			1:08:05

== Chart positions ==
Chart (1999)	Peak position
US Top R&B/Hip-Hop Albums (Billboard)	72
US Heatseekers Albums (Billboard)	47
