= Hawk (Big Hawk album) =

HAWK

Studio album by Big Hawk
- Released: February 27, 2001
- Recorded: 2000–2001
- Genre: Southern hip-hop
- Labels: Ghetto Dreams; Game Face
- Producers: Robert "Kenny Lou" Louis (exec.); Willie "Willow" Malone (also exec.); Pretty Todd; Shadow Black; Bruce Katara; D.E.L.; Double D; Mr. M.J.; Q-Stone; Spectacular; Teno

Big Hawk chronology
Under H.A.W.K.'s Wings (2000)	HAWK (2001)	Wreckin' 2004 (2004)

HAWK is the 2nd studio album by American rapper Big Hawk from Houston, Texas. It was released on February 27, 2001, through Game Face and Ghetto Dreams.

== Track listing ==
No.	Title	Producer(s)	Length
1.	"Hot Shit"	Shadow Black
2.	"Diggin' Da South" (featuring Z-Ro)	Willie "Willow" Malone
3.	"They Scared" (featuring Lil' O)	Shadow Black
4.	"Nigga What"	Q-Stone
5.	"Pimpin' Ain't a Thang" (featuring Scooby & Jim Deezy)	Willie "Willow" Malone
6.	"You Already Know" (featuring Big T)	Teno
7.	"That Other Shit"	Spectacular
8.	"War" (featuring Big Pokey & Scooby)	Pretty Todd
9.	"Get Dat Doe" (featuring Chris Ward, Killa Kyleon & Poppy)	D.E.L.
10.	"What You Boys Know" (featuring Small Boy)	Bruce Katara
11.	"Check Yo Self"	Double D
12.	"On Your Mark" (featuring Starchy Arch & Grit Boys)	Pretty Todd
13.	"Leave Us Alone" (featuring Tiny T & Lil' O)	Mr. M.J.
14.	"Make 'Em Feel It" (featuring Trae)	Shadow Black
15.	"You Don't Wanna Fuck With Me" (featuring Godfather)	Willie "Willow" Malone
16.	"This Is for the Real" (featuring Small Boy)	Willie "Willow" Malone

== Personnel ==
- John Edward Hawkins – main artist
- Darius Coleman – featured artist (tracks: 5, 8, 12)
- Oreoluwa Mitchell Magnus-Lawson – featured artist (tracks: 2, 13)
- Poppy – featured artist (tracks: 9, 12)
- Small Boy – featured artist (tracks: 10, 16)
- Joseph Wayne McVey IV – featured artist (track 2)
- J. "Jim Deezy" Babineaux – featured artist (track 5)
- A. Morgan – featured artist (track 6)
- Milton Powell – featured artist (track 8)
- Chris Ward – featured artist (track 9)
- Kyle Riley – featured artist (track 9)
- Starchy Arch – featured artist (track 12)
- Tiny T – featured artist (track 13)
- Frazier Othel Thompson III – featured artist (track 14)
- Carl Jones – featured artist (track 15)
- Willy Malone – producer (tracks: 2, 5, 15–16), mixing, recording (tracks: 1–3, 5–6, 9–10, 13–16), executive producer
- Shadow Black – producer (tracks: 1, 3, 14)
- Todd E. Berry – producer (tracks: 8, 12), mixing, recording (tracks: 8, 11–12)
- Quincy Whetstone – producer (track 4)
- Teno – producer (track 6)
- Spectacular – producer (track 7)
- D.E.L. – producer (track 9)
- Bruce Katara – producer (track 10)
- André Sargent – producer (track 11)
- Mike "MJ" Johnson – recording & producer (track 13)
- James Hoover – mixing
- Sean Blaze – recording (track 4)
- Dietrich Pinnock – recording (track 7)
- John Moran – mastering
- Robert Louis – executive producer
- Mike Frost – artwork
- Chad Porter – photography

== Chart positions ==
Chart (2002)	Peak position
US Top R&B/Hip-Hop Albums (Billboard)	45
US Independent Albums (Billboard)	43
