= D-Game 2000 =

Studio album by Big Pokey
- Released: August 22, 2000
- Recorded: 2000
- Studio: Uptown Recording Studio (Houston, TX)
- Genre: Southern hip-hop
- Length: 67:30
- Label: Chevis Entertainment
- Producers: Paul Chevis (exec.); Big-E (exec.); Harvey Luv; Jhiame; Ray Sneed; Derrick "Grizz" Evans; Black Poet; Big Daddy; Self; Sean Blaze; Sean "Solo" Jemison; Willie "Willow" Malone

Big Pokey chronology
Hardest Pit in the Litter (1999)	D-Game 2000 (2000)	Tha Collabo (2001)

Professional ratings
Review scores
Source	Rating
AllMusic	2/5 stars

D-Game 2000 is the second studio album by American rapper Big Pokey, from Houston, Texas. It was released on August 22, 2000, via Chevis Entertainment. The album peaked at #71 on the US Billboard Top R&B/Hip-Hop Albums chart.

== Track listing ==
No.	Title	Producer(s)	Length
1.	"Untamed Gorilla"	Derrick "Grizz" Evans	3:31
2.	"Dope Game 2000" (featuring Godfather & Mike D)	Willie "Willow" Malone	3:31
3.	"That's All We Had" (featuring Lil' O)	Sean "Solo" Jemison	4:15
4.	"Menagae 'Tois" (featuring Mike D)	D.J. Harvee Luv	3:38
5.	"On Choppers" (featuring Big Moe)	Jhiame	4:33
6.	"Niggas" (Interlude)	Black Poet	1:33
7.	"Swallowed by the Game"	Big Daddy; Self (co.)	3:57
8.	"Mind and Muscle"	Ray Sneed	3:47
9.	"Still off the Chain" (featuring Big Hawk & Carmen SanDiego)	Sean Blaze	4:01
10.	"Why Yall Still Talking Down" (featuring Chris Ward & Big-E)	D.J. Harvee Luv	4:07
11.	"Duck-N-Buss" (featuring Godfather)	Ray Sneed	3:43
12.	"Little Mama's" (featuring Chris Ward & Godfather)	Derrick "Grizz" Evans	3:46
13.	"Look Twice" (featuring Lil' O)	Ray Sneed	4:05
14.	"Throwed-N-Da Game"	Jhiame	3:53
15.	"Hear My Cry" (Interlude)	Black Poet	2:04
16.	"Get out Our Way" (featuring Mafia Mike & Chris Ward)	Jhiame	4:23
17.	"That's the Way" (featuring 1100)	Big Daddy; Self	3:16
18.	"Keep My Name out Yo Mouth" (featuring Will-Lean, Mike D, Mafia Mike, Chris Ward & 3-2)	D.J. Harvee Luv	5:27
Total length:			1:07:30

== Chart positions ==
Chart (2000)	Peak position
US Top R&B/Hip-Hop Albums (Billboard)	71
US Independent Albums (Billboard)	31
US Heatseekers Albums (Billboard)	38
