= Bruce "Grim" Rhodes =

American record producer

Bruce “Grim” Rhodes (born November 29, 1971), also known as Beathoven, is an American record producer, mixing engineer, and entrepreneur. He has produced albums for and overseen the careers of many Southern rappers. His contribution to rap dates back to DJing on 8Ball & MJG's debut album Comin' Out Hard, and the debut of Scarface. He produced "Wanna Be A Baller" and the entire Sittin' Fat Down South album for Lil' Troy.

Rhodes is credited as a key figure in the popularization of Third Coast (Gulf Coast) rap music, producing for artists such as C-Note and the Botany Boyz, Mass 187, Willie D, Yungstar, Fat Pat, Lil' Keke, and Big Hawk. Along with DJ Screw, he set the tone for Houston's underground rap music scene during the 1990s. He is ranked as one of the top selling producers in the South, having sales of over 1.9 million albums.
