= Back to Ballin =

Studio album by Lil' Troy
- Released: September 11, 2001
- Recorded: 2001
- Genre: Southern hip hop, Gangsta Rap, Chopped & Screwed effect
- Label: Short Stop Records; Koch Records

Lil' Troy chronology
Sittin' Fat Down South (1998)	Back to Ballin (2001)	Paperwork (2006)

Professional ratings
Review scores
Source	Rating
AllMusic	2.5/5 stars
The Encyclopedia of Popular Music	3/5 stars
RapReviews	6/10
Vibe	3/5 stars

Back to Ballin is the second studio album by the southern rapper Lil' Troy, released in 2001.

The album peaked at No. 95 on the Billboard 200.

== Critical reception ==
The Village Voice wrote that Lil' Troy's "squeaky voice [is] multi-multi-tracked to sound like at least a half a dozen small woodland creatures cold representin.'"

== Track listing ==
1. "Pimp Is Back" :39
2. "For Years" (featuring D-Man & R-Dis) 3:48
3. "Mo Money, Mo Problems" 4:50
4. "Pop Ya Collar" 3:58
5. "We Gon Lean" (featuring Lil' Flip & R-Dis) 4:23
6. "Back to Ballin" (featuring T-2) 3:45
7. "There He Go" 3:43
8. "Lesbian Nights" 4:10
9. "Long Time" 3:30
10. "Let's Smoke" 4:19
11. "Buckle" 3:40
12. "Wired Up" 3:58
13. "Touch Ya Toes" 3:29
14. "Keep My Name Out Your Mouth" 3:49
15. "Dead Wrong" 1:01
16. "We Gon Lean" (Remix by Dirk) 4:06
17. " Steady Shinin'" 5:22
18. " Baby Girl Wanna Ride On Me" 3:21
19. "Wanna Be a Baller" (Chopped & Screwed Version) 7:57
