= Boss Hogg Outlaws =

Studio album by E.S.G. & Slim Thug
- Released: November 6, 2001
- Studio: The Lounge (Houston, TX)
- Genre: Southern rap
- Length: 1:02:32
- Label: S.E.S. Entertainment
- Producer: E.S.G. (exec.); Slim Thug (exec.); Sin (also exec.); Prowla; Q-Stone; Sneed; Chop Shop Productions

E.S.G. chronology
City Under Siege (2000)	Boss Hogg Outlaws (2001)	All American Gangsta (2005)

Slim Thug chronology
Boss Hogg Outlaws (2001)	The Big Unit (2003)

Singles from Boss Hogg Outlaws
- 1. "Getchya Hands Up" Released: 2001; 2. "Thug It Up" Released: 2002

Professional ratings
Review scores
Source	Rating
AllMusic	4/5 stars
RapReviews	7.5/10 stars

Boss Hogg Outlaws is a collaborative studio album by American southern rap artists E.S.G. and Slim Thug from Houston, Texas. It was released on November 6, 2001, via Houston-based record label S.E.S. Entertainment. It features guest appearances from Big Hawk, Bun B, Carmen SanDiego, Daz Dillinger, Lil' Keke, Lil' O, Scarface and Z-Ro. The album peaked at #55 on the Top R&B/Hip-Hop Albums, #16 on the Independent Albums and #30 on the Heatseekers Albums in the US Billboard charts. Two singles were released from the album: "Getchya Hands Up" and "Thug It Up".

== Track listing ==
No.	Title	Producer(s)	Length
1.	"Here We Come"	Sin	3:35
2.	"Smoke Break"		1:06
3.	"I'm the Boss"	Prowla	4:17
4.	"Thug It Up" (featuring Bun B)	Sin	3:43
5.	"Rollin'"	Sin	3:51
6.	"Phone Check" (featuring Scarface)		1:00
7.	"Down Here" (featuring Lil' Keke)	Sin	4:12
8.	"Work That Thang"	Sneed	3:54
9.	"Dirty South" (featuring Carmen SanDiego)	Q-Stone	3:29
10.	"Ride With You" (featuring Daz Dillinger)	Sin	3:46
11.	"Street Millionaire" (featuring Lil' O)	Sin	3:26
12.	"Murder Weapon"	Sin	4:27
13.	"Watch Out" (featuring Big Hawk)	The Chop Shop	4:07
14.	"Mash for Our Cash" (featuring C-Styles)	Sin	3:57
15.	"Getchya Hands Up"	Q-Stone	3:57
16.	"We Ain't Trippin' No Mo" (featuring Z-Ro)	Prowla	4:45
17.	Untitled		0:04
18.	"Gangstafied" (featuring Sir Daily & Doodie)	Sin	4:55
Total length:			1:02:32

iTunes Store Platinum Edition Bonus Track
No.	Title	Length
19.	"Break These Boys Off" (featuring Big Hawk)	3:48

== Personnel ==
- Cedric Dormaine Hill – main artist, executive producer
- Stayve Jerome Thomas – main artist, executive producer
- Bernard Freeman – featured artist (track 4)
- Brad Terrence Jordan – featured artist (track 6)
- Marcus Lakee Edwards – featured artist (track 7)
- Carmen Ginwright – featured artist (track 9)
- Delmar Drew Arnaud – featured artist (track 10)
- Ore Magnus Lawson – featured artist (track 11)
- John Edward Hawkins – featured artist (tracks: 13, 19)
- C. "C-Styles" Lander – featured artist (track 14)
- Joseph Wayne McVey IV – featured artist (track 16)
- T. "Sir Daily" Harris – featured artist (track 18)
- Doodie – featured artist (track 18)
- Sinclair "Sin" Ridley – additional vocals (track 3), additional programming (tracks: 8, 16), producer (tracks: 1, 4–5, 7, 10–12, 14, 18), recording, mixing, mastering, executive producer
- Michael Wilson – additional vocals (tracks: 10, 13)
- Rick Marcel – guitar (track 18)
- Dantly "Prowler" Wyatt – producer (tracks: 3, 16)
- Quincy Whetstone – producer (tracks: 9, 15)
- N. Sneed – producer (track 8)
- Chop Shop – producer (track 13)
- Automatik Media – artwork

== Charts ==
Chart (2002)	Peak position
US Top R&B/Hip-Hop Albums (Billboard)	55
US Independent Albums (Billboard)	16
US Heatseekers Albums (Billboard)	30
