= It Was All a Dream (Lil' Keke album) =

Studio album by Lil' Keke
- Released: July 13, 1999
- Recorded: 1998–1999
- Studio: Jam Down Studio (Houston, TX); No Mad Studio
- Genre: Hip hop
- Length: 1:11:42
- Label: Jam Down Records
- Producer: Patrick Lewis (exec.); Vincent Perry (exec.); Commission Music Group; Lee Johnson; Sin

Lil' Keke chronology
The Commission (1998)	It Was All a Dream (1999)	Peepin' in My Window (2001)

Professional ratings
Review scores
Source	Rating
AllMusic	3/5 stars

It Was All a Dream is the third studio album by American rapper Lil' Keke from Houston, Texas. It was released on July 13, 1999 via Jam Down Records. It was reissued in 2003 by another Houston-based record label Rap Classics. The album features guest appearances from 8Ball, Big Hawk, Big Pokey, B-Legit, Juvenile, Krazy, Madd Hatta, South Park Mexican, and more.

== Track listing ==
No.	Title	Producer(s)	Length
1.	"Goodpart" (featuring Madd Hatta)	Commission Music Group	3:44
2.	"Southside (Remix)" (featuring 8Ball)	Lee Johnson; Commission Music Group	5:30
3.	"Money Money" (featuring Mobb Figgaz)	Lee Johnson	4:12
4.	"One Love"	Lee Johnson	4:11
5.	"Superstars" (featuring Down South Deficit, Big Hawk & Herschelwood Hardheadz)	Sin	3:38
6.	"Dusk 2 Dawn" (featuring B-Legit & Big Pokey)	Commission Music Group	3:46
7.	"Until We Reach the Top"	Sin	5:01
8.	"Don and the Underboss" (featuring Lil' C)	Commission Music Group	4:22
9.	"Everyday All Day" (featuring Phaz)	Commission Music Group	4:22
10.	"Make Em Break It" (featuring Juvenile, Turk & Birdman)	Commission Music Group	4:09
11.	"When We Ride" (featuring Crazy & Q.B.)	Commission Music Group	3:55
12.	"Gotta Get It"	Commission Music Group	4:52
13.	"Do You Wanna Ride" (featuring Cl'che & Phaz)	Commission Music Group	4:18
14.	"Eazy Come Eazy Go"	Lee Johnson	3:50
15.	"Shake It Baby"	Lee Johnson; Commission Music Group	3:38
16.	"Shops and Bops" (featuring Archie Lee)	Commission Music Group	4:08
17.	"World Wilde Playaz" (featuring South Park Mexican, Mr. 3-2 & The Most Hated)	Commission Music Group	4:06
Total length:			1:11:42

== Charts ==
Chart (1999)	Peak position
US Top R&B/Hip-Hop Albums (Billboard)	51
US Heatseekers Albums (Billboard)	17
