= Wreckin' 2004 =

Studio album by Lil' Keke & Big Hawk
- Released: January 4, 2004
- Recorded: 2003–2004
- Genre: Southern hip-hop
- Length: 64:17
- Label: Presidential Records
- Producers: Big Rodsta (exec.); Tonka (exec.); Big Hawk (exec.); Lil' Keke (exec.)

Lil' Keke & Big Hawk chronology
Wreckin' 2004 (2004)	Still Wreckin' (2008)

Lil' Keke chronology
Changin' Lanes (2003)	Wreckin' 2004 (2004)	Currency (2004)

Big Hawk chronology
HAWK (2001)	Wreckin' 2004 (2004)	Endangered Species (2007)

Professional ratings
Review scores
Source	Rating
AllMusic	3/5 stars

Wreckin' 2004 is a collaborative studio album by American rappers and Screwed Up Click members Lil' Keke and Big Hawk. It was released on January 4, 2004 via Presidential Records. Its cover is a parody to the video game Madden NFL 2004. It was the last project released in Big Hawks lifetime as he was shot and killed on May 1, 2006

== Track listing ==
No.	Title	Length
1.	"Intro: Get Ready"	0:47
2.	"Wreckin 2K4"	3:26
3.	"Hit'em"	3:52
4.	"Catch a Square" (featuring Mussilini)	4:04
5.	"Mix It Up" (featuring Kevo & Lyrical 187)	4:19
6.	"Hustle" (featuring Lil' Head)	3:49
7.	"Understand" (featuring Grit Boys)	4:35
8.	"No Matter What!"	4:45
9.	"We Did That"	3:16
10.	"Don't Cry" (featuring Quest & Big Rodsta)	4:02
11.	"Da Real (Skit)" (featuring Big Rodsta & Tonka)	1:16
12.	"Who U R" (featuring Quest, Cl'che, Beezo & Mack Biggers)	5:28
13.	"Out of Luck" (featuring Kevo)	4:30
14.	"Stop Bullshittin" (featuring Big Pokey)	3:33
15.	"We Smash" (featuring Beezo, D-Capo & D.Z.)	4:05
16.	"Issue" (featuring Mussilini, D-Black, Big Pup & James)	3:29
17.	"Warriors" (featuring Mussilini & Big Pup)	4:06
18.	"Outro: Feel That" (featuring Big Rodsta)	0:55
Total length:		1:04:17

== Chart positions ==
Chart (2004)	Peak position
US Top R&B/Hip-Hop Albums (Billboard)	93
