= Loved by Few, Hated by Many =

Loved by Few, Hated by Many may refer to:

- Loved by Few, Hated by Many (Lil' Keke album), 2008
- Loved by Few, Hated by Many (Willie D album), 2000
