= Peepin' in My Window =

Peepin in My Window

Studio album by Lil' Keke
- Released: July 17, 2001
- Recorded: 2000–2001
- Studio: Screw House; Jam Down Studio (Houston, TX)
- Genre: Southern hip hop; screwed and chopped
- Length: 54:07
- Label: Pyrex

Lil' Keke chronology
It Was All a Dream (1999)	Peepin in My Window (2001)	Platinum in da Ghetto (2001)

Peepin in My Window is the fourth studio album by American rapper Lil' Keke. It was released on July 17, 2001 via Pyrex Records. Recording sessions took place at Screw House and at Jam Down Studio in Houston. It features guest appearances from Commission Music Group, Archie Lee, Fat Pat, 3-2, AG, Al-D, Big Hawk, Big Pokey and Down South Deficit. There is also a screwed & chopped version available.

== Track listing ==
No.	Title	Length
1.	"Intro"	0:18
2.	"Peepin in My Window"	10:55
3.	"On da Southside" (featuring Archie Lee)	3:27
4.	"Here It Is" (featuring Archie Lee and Commission Music Group)	4:14
5.	"Love 2 Make $" (featuring 3-2)	4:04
6.	"Never Change" (featuring A.G. and Commission Music Group)	3:48
7.	"Commission" (featuring Fat Pat)	3:02
8.	"Who Dat"	3:42
9.	"Rap Games" (featuring Big Pokey)	5:23
10.	"In Tha Game" (featuring Al-D and Commission Music Group)	3:20
11.	"Swang Down" (featuring Fat Pat)	7:35
12.	"Superstars (Screwed)" (featuring Down South Deficit and H.A.W.K.)	4:19
Total length:		54:07
