= Back Back =

- "Back Back", a single by Lil O and Big Hawk from the 2000 album Da Fat Rat wit da Cheeze
- "Back Back", a song by Moka Only from the 2012 album Airport 6
