= Da Fat Rat wit da Cheeze =

Studio album by Lil' O
- Released: November 21, 2000
- Studio: Top Notch Studios (Houston, TX)
- Genre: Southern hip hop; gangsta rap
- Length: 1:21:59
- Label: Game Face Entertainment
- Producer: Robert "Kenny Lou" Louis (exec.); Blue; Willie "Willow" Malone; Big Swift; Chicken Hawk; Double D; Drez

Lil' O chronology
Blood Money (1999)	Da Fat Rat wit da Cheeze (2000)	Food On Tha Table (2003)

Singles from Da Fat Rat wit da Cheeze
- 1. "Back Back" Released: 2001

Professional ratings
Review scores
Source	Rating
AllMusic	3.5/5 stars
The Source	3/5 stars

Da Fat Rat wit da Cheeze is the second solo studio album by American rapper Lil' O, from Houston, Texas. It was released on November 21, 2000, via Game Face Entertainment. The album features Screwed Up Click members (Big Hawk, Big Moe, Big Pokey, E.S.G., Mike D, Z-Ro) and fellow Houston-based recording artists, including Big T, BFK, Poppy and Slim Thug among others. The album peaked at number 199 on the Billboard 200 and number 63 on the Top R&B/Hip-Hop Albums chart, making it his most successful album to date. Its lead single, "Back Back", peaked at number 62 on the Billboard Hot R&B/Hip-Hop Songs chart and number 65 on the R&B/Hip-Hop Airplay chart.

== Track listing ==
No.	Title	Producer(s)	Length
1.	"Da Fat Rat Wit Da Cheeze"	Blue; Drez	5:00
2.	"The Throwdest" (featuring Big Moe, Carmen SanDiego, Poppy & Chris Ward)	Willie "Willow" Malone	4:12
3.	"Thug Niggaz Pt. 2" (featuring Big Pokey)	Big Swift	3:40
4.	"What Fo" (featuring E.S.G. & Big Moe)	Willie "Willow" Malone	4:46
5.	"Beg, Steal and Borrow" (featuring Papa Reu)	Blue	4:15
6.	"I'm Ready" (featuring Poppy)	Blue	4:24
7.	"Ooh Wee" (featuring Z-Ro)	Blue	4:58
8.	"Slow Down" (featuring Big Moe)	Chicken Hawk	4:26
9.	"Back Back" (featuring Big Hawk)	Blue	4:15
10.	"We Ain't Broke No Mo" (featuring Slim Thug & Big T)	Willie "Willow" Malone	4:07
11.	"After the Club" (Skit)		0:40
12.	"Choo Choo" (featuring Mike D, Mr. 3-2 & Big Hawk)	Willie "Willow" Malone	4:36
13.	"Bend Ya Knees, Touch Ya Toes (Do Ya Thang)" (featuring E.S.G. & Carmen SanDiego)	Big Swift	4:28
14.	"Can't Tell Em Nothin'" (Skit)		0:39
15.	"I Wonder Why" (featuring Bad Actaz & Chad Jones)	Double D	4:29
16.	"Hold It Down" (featuring BFK & Z-Ro)	Blue	3:49
17.	"I Don't Talk"	Big Swift	3:41
18.	"Playas Get Chose" (featuring Big Moe, Big Hawk, Mr. 3-2 & Slikk Breeze)	Chicken Hawk; Willie "Willow" Malone	4:52
19.	"Revenge" (featuring Godfather & Poppy)		3:38
20.	"My Loved Ones" (featuring Billy Cook)	Double D	5:21
Total length:			1:21:59

== Personnel ==
- Oreoluwa Mitchell Magnus-Lawson – main artist
- Kenneth Doniell Moore – featured artist (tracks: 2, 4, 8, 18)
- Poppy of Grit Boys – featured artist (tracks: 2, 6, 19)
- John Edward Hawkins – featured artist (tracks: 9, 12, 18)
- Carmen Ginwright – featured artist (tracks: 2, 13)
- Cedric Dormaine Hill – featured artist (tracks: 4, 13)
- Joseph Wayne McVey IV – featured artist (tracks: 7, 16)
- Christopher Barriere – featured artist (tracks: 12, 18)
- Chris Ward – featured artist (track 2)
- Milton Powell – featured artist (track 3)
- Reuben Nero – featured artist (track 5)
- A. Morgan – featured artist (track 10)
- Stayve Jerome Thomas – featured artist (track 10)
- Michael Dixon – featured artist (track 12)
- Bad Actaz – featured artist (track 15)
- Chad Jones – featured artist (track 15)
- BFK – featured artist (track 16)
- Slikk Breeze – featured artist (track 18)
- Carl Jones – featured artist (track 19)
- Derrick Blaylock – featured artist (track 20)
- Blue of the Wreckshop Family – producer (tracks: 1, 5, 6, 7, 9, 16)
- Willy Malone – producer (tracks: 2, 4, 10, 12, 18), mixing (tracks: 1–19), engineering
- John "Swift" Catalon – producer (tracks: 3, 13, 17), mixing (tracks: 2, 13, 17)
- Barry Risper – producer (tracks: 8, 18)
- André Sargent – producer (tracks: 15, 20)
- Drez – producer (track 1)
- Robert Louis – executive producer
- Gary L. Moon – mastering

== Charts ==
Chart (2001)	Peak position
US Billboard 200	199
US Top R&B/Hip-Hop Albums (Billboard)	63
US Heatseekers Albums (Billboard)	13
