= Sittin' Fat Down South =

- Universal Records reissue cover

Studio album by Lil' Troy
- Released: June 29, 1999
- Genre: Southern hip-hop; gangsta rap
- Length: 54:13
- Label: Short Stop; Me & Mine
- Producer: Bruce "Grim" Rhodes

Lil' Troy chronology
Sittin' Fat Down South (1999)	Back to Ballin (2001)

Singles from Sittin' Fat Down South
- 1. "Wanna Be a Baller" Released: 1999

Professional ratings
Review scores
Source	Rating
AllMusic	2.5/5 stars
The Austin Chronicle	3/4 stars

Sittin' Fat Down South is the debut studio album by American rapper and record producer Lil' Troy. It was released in 1999 through Short Stop Records and Me & Mine Entertainment. Produced entirely by Bruce "Grim" Rhodes, it features contributions from Ardis, Bad Co., Lil' Will, Nattie, Scarface, Big Ced, 2 Low, Big Hawk, Big T, Botany Boyz, Fat Pat, Rasheed, Scoopastar, Willie D, Youngsta, King George and Mr. 3-2.

Republic/Universal Records reissued the album on June 29, 1999, which made it to reach number 20 on the Billboard 200 and number 6 on the Top R&B/Hip-Hop Albums charts in the United States. It was certified platinum by the Recording Industry Association of America on October 12, 1999, for selling over a million copies in the US alone.

The second single off of the album, "Wanna Be a Baller", peaked at number 70 on the Billboard Hot 100, number 40 on the Hot R&B/Hip-Hop Songs, number 31 on the Hot Rap Songs and number 8 on the Rhythmic Top 40 charts.

== Track listing ==
UD-53278
No.	Title	Length
1.	"Intro"	0:17
2.	"Thugs Niggas" (performed by 2 Low and Scoopastar)	3:27
3.	"Ain't No Luv" (performed by Bad Co., Big Ced and Nattie)	4:20
4.	"Wanna Be a Baller" (performed by Yungstar, Fat Pat, Lil' Will, H.A.W.K. and Big T)	5:55
5.	"Chop, Chop, Chop" (performed by Botany Boyz, Lil' Troy and Rasheed)	3:51
6.	"Small Time" (performed by Lil' Troy, Scarface and Lil' Will)	3:49
7.	"Still a Bitch" (performed by Bad Co. and Nattie)	3:20
8.	"Where's the Love" (performed by Willie D., Lil' Troy and Ardis)	4:24
9.	"Loyal to the Sign" (performed by Ardis and Lil' Troy)	3:57
10.	"Another Head Put to Rest" (performed by Scarface)	5:17
11.	"Dem Niggas" (performed by Ardis and Lil' Troy)	3:51
12.	"Diamond & Gold" (performed by Lil' Will and Lil' Troy)	2:59
13.	"Rollin'" (performed by Bad Co., Big Ced and Nattie)	5:07
14.	"Wanna Be a Baller (Edit)"	3:39
Total length:		54:13

Leftover tracks from the original version

1. "Lock n da Game" (performed by Mr. 3-2)
10. "Scarface" (performed by Scarface)
15. "Don't Fuck wit Us" (performed by King George)

== Charts ==
=== Weekly charts ===
Chart (1999)	Peak position
US Billboard 200	20
US Top R&B/Hip-Hop Albums (Billboard)	6

=== Year-end charts ===
Chart (1999)	Position
US Billboard 200	78
US Top R&B/Hip-Hop Albums (Billboard)	38

== Certifications ==
Region	Certification	Certified units/sales
United States (RIAA)	Platinum	1,000,000^{^}
^{^} Shipments figures based on certification alone.
