= Platinum in da Ghetto =

Platinum In da Ghetto

Studio album by Lil' Keke
- Released: November 6, 2001
- Recorded: 2000–2001
- Genre: Hip hop
- Length: 59:21
- Label: Koch Records; In The Paint Records
- Producer: Danny "DX" Longmire; Sean "Solo" Jemison; Sin; G. Swain; Shannon Sanders; Street Flavor; Sonny Paradise; DJ Dev

Lil' Keke chronology
| Peepin' in My Window (2001) | Platinum In da Ghetto (2001) | Birds Fly South (2002) |

Professional ratings
Review scores
| Source | Rating |
|---|---|
| AllMusic | 4/5 stars |

Platinum In da Ghetto is the fifth studio album by American rapper Lil' Keke from Houston, Texas. It was released on November 6, 2001 via Koch Records. It features guest appearances from 8Ball & MJG, Big Hawk, Billy Cook, Cl'che, C-Note, E.S.G., Lil C, Liz Leite, Slim Thug and Z-Ro. There is also a screwed & chopped version available.

== Track listing ==
| No. | Title | Producer(s) | Length |
|---|---|---|---|
| 1. | "Intro" | | 0:31 |
| 2. | "Platinum in da Ghetto" (featuring Billy Cook) | DX | 4:21 |
| 3. | "Coast 2 Coast" | Sean 'Solo' Jemison | 3:39 |
| 4. | "Skit 1" | | 0:13 |
| 5. | "Do You Love It" | DX | 2:53 |
| 6. | "Callin My Name" (featuring 8Ball & Liz Leite) | Sin | 4:11 |
| 7. | "Love for Ya" (featuring E.S.G. & Slim Thug) | G. Swain | 3:22 |
| 8. | "Pyrex Shakin'" (featuring Lil C) | DX | 3:39 |
| 9. | "Where da South At?" (featuring C-Note) | Sean 'Solo' Jemison | 3:58 |
| 10. | "Mr. D.J." (featuring Z-Ro) | DJ Dev; Shannon Sanders; Sonny Paradise; Street Flavor | 4:35 |
| 11. | "Cowgirl" (featuring MJG & Cl'che) | Sean 'Solo' Jemison | 3:33 |
| 12. | "Skit 2" | | 0:20 |
| 13. | "Bad Man" | Sean 'Solo' Jemison | 4:32 |
| 14. | "Where My Dog At" | DX | 4:08 |
| 15. | "Off da Chain" | DX | 3:57 |
| 16. | "3 Time Felon" (featuring Big Hawk) | DX | 4:11 |
| 17. | "What I Wanna Do" (featuring Liz Leite) | Sin | 4:07 |
| 18. | "Let's Get Fucked Up" (featuring Lil C) | DX | 3:03 |
| Total length: | | | 59:21 |

== Chart positions ==
| Chart (2001) | Peak position |
|---|---|
| US Billboard 200 | 122 |
| US Top R&B/Hip-Hop Albums (Billboard) | 22 |
| US Independent Albums (Billboard) | 3 |
| US Heatseekers Albums (Billboard) | 1 |
