= Miguel Gomez (actor) =

Actor and musical artist (born 1985)

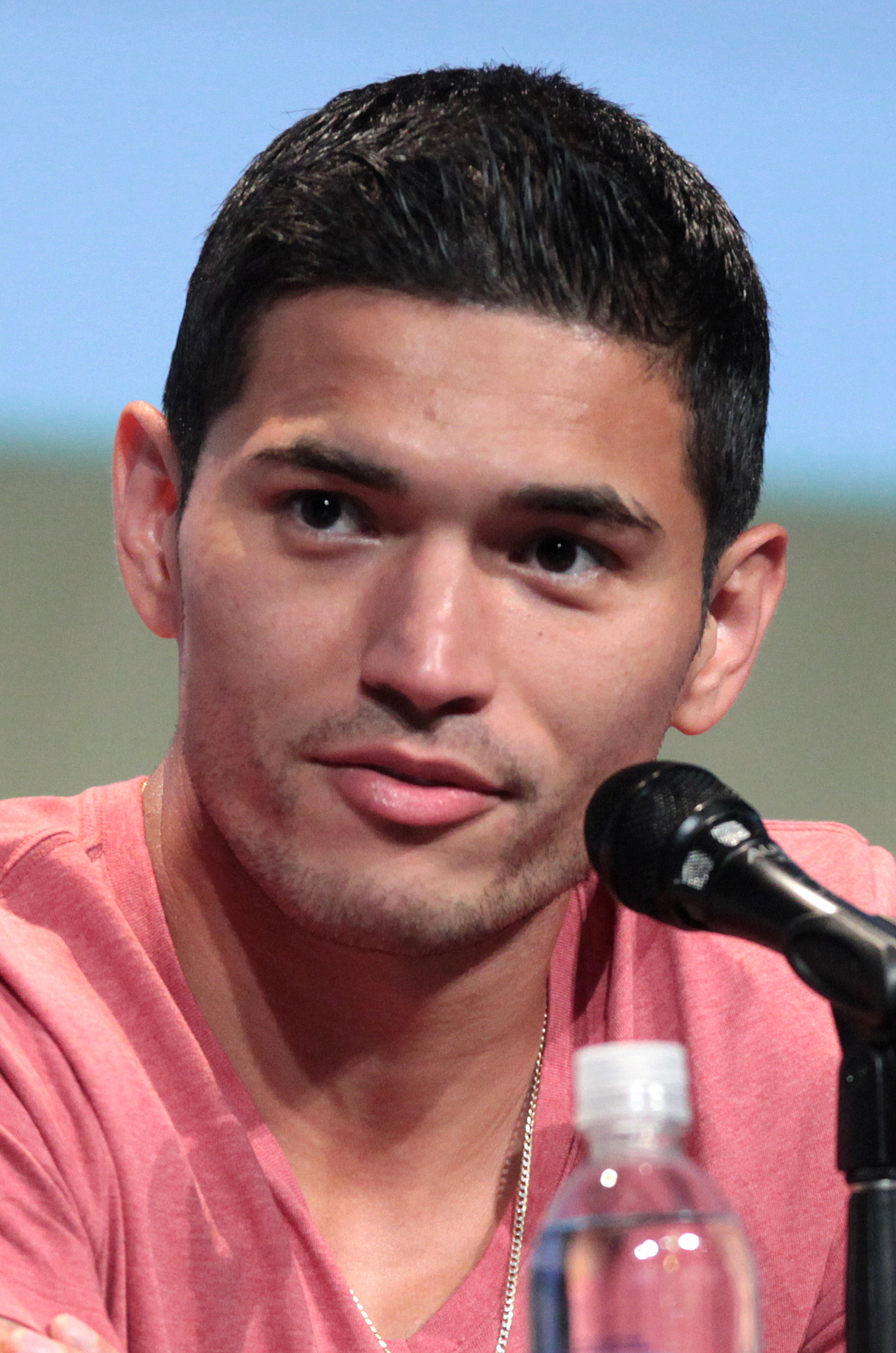
- At San Diego Comic-Con in 2015

Background information
- Also known as: Aztek Escobar, Tek
- Born: August 20, 1985 (age 41); Cali, Colombia
- Genres: Southern hip hop, Latin hip hop, gangsta rap
- Occupations: Actor, rapper
- Years active: 2005–present
- Formerly of: Wolfpack Coalition

Miguel Gomez (also known as Aztek Escobar; born August 20, 1985) is a Colombian-American actor and rapper. Escobar was the first artist officially signed to Jay-Z's Roc-La-Familia label. From 2021 to 2022, he starred as Ivan Ortiz on CBS crime drama series FBI: Most Wanted.

== Biography ==
Miguel Gomez was born in Cali, Colombia. He went to Clements High School (Sugar Land, TX), graduating in 2003. He played a small role in the music video for Soul Survivor by rapper Young Jeezy in 2005.

Gomez made his television debut in the Miami episode of the FX comedy series Louie. He got his big break in 2014 when he landed the role of Augustin "Gus" Elizalde on the FX horror drama television series The Strain. He first became known to film audiences for his prominent role in the 2015 boxing drama Southpaw.

Before acting, he rapped under the name Aztek Escobar and was the first artist signed by Jay Z's Roc-La-Familia label. His debut album was to be named Colombian Necktie but the label was dissolved before the album was released.

== Filmography ==
Year	Title	Role	Notes
2012	Louie	Ramon	Episode: "Miami"
2012	The Domino Effect	Jake	
2013	Bless Me, Ultima	Eugene	
2014–17	The Strain	Augustin 'Gus' Elizalde	Main role (seasons 1–4)
2015	Southpaw	Miguel 'Magic' Escobar	
2016	Blood in the Water	Freedgood	
2017	Megan Leavey	Gomez	
2017	SMILF	Rafi	Main role
2020	LA's Finest	Ricky Leon	Recurring role
2021–2022	FBI: Most Wanted	Special Agent Ivan Ortiz	Main role
2025–2026	NCIS: Origins	Manny	Recurring role

== Discography ==
=== Mixtapes ===
- 2005: King of Kings
- 2006: Rise to Power
- 2007: Blood In Blood Out
- 2009: I Swear to God

=== Promotional singles ===
List of singles, with selected chart positions, showing year released and album name
Title	Year	Peak chart positions		Album
Title	Year	US	US R&B	Album
"Draped Up" (remix) (Bun B featuring Lil' Keke, Slim Thug, Chamillionaire, Paul Wall, Mike Jones, Aztek, Lil' Flip and Z-Ro)	2007	—	45	Trill
