= The Big Unit =

The Big Unit may refer to:

- Randy Johnson, American Major League Baseball pitcher
- Quinten Lynch, Australian football full forward
- The Big Unit (album), by Lil' Keke and Slim Thug (2003)
- Adam Mezza, A Big Unit, Porter Guzzler
