= Tha Collabo =

Studio album by Big Pokey & Wreckshop Wolfpack
- Released: November 6, 2001
- Studios: Holman Sound Design (Houston, TX); Southside Studios (Houston, TX)
- Genre: Southern hip-hop
- Length: 60:01
- Label: Wreckshop Records
- Producers: D-Reck (exec.); Chicken Hawk; Double D; Noke D

Big Pokey chronology
| D-Game 2000 (2000) | Tha Collabo (2001) | Da Sky's Da Limit (2002) |

Tha Collabo is a collaborative studio album by American rapper Big Pokey and hip-hop group Wreckshop Wolfpack from Houston, Texas. It was released on November 6, 2001, through Wreckshop Records, and was produced entirely by Platinum Soul Productions (Double D, Chicken Hawk & Noke D). It also features guest appearances from Big Moe, Pimp C, Z-Ro & Chris Ward among others. The album peaked at #74 on the US Billboard Top R&B/Hip-Hop Albums chart.

== Track listing ==
All music is composed by Platinum Soul Productions.

| No. | Title | Length |
|---|---|---|
| 1. | "The Interview/Skit" (performed by D-Reck & Ace-Dawg) | 1:40 |
| 2. | "To Burn to Burn" (performed by D Gotti, D-Reck, Dirty $, Noke D & Tyte Eyes) | 2:22 |
| 3. | "Head in the Vette" (performed by Pimp C, D Gotti, D-Reck & Noke D) | 3:12 |
| 4. | "What It Do" (performed by Big Pokey & D Gotti) | 3:21 |
| 5. | "What Throwd/Radio" (performed by Big Pokey, D Gotti & Big Moe) | 3:14 |
| 6. | "Be a Rapper/Skit" (performed by Ace-Dawg) | 0:23 |
| 7. | "2 Way On/Club" (performed by Big Pokey & Chris Ward) | 3:55 |
| 8. | "Hoes/Skit" (performed by Ace-Dawg) | 0:50 |
| 9. | "On Yo Knee's" (performed by D Gotti, Noke D, Tyte Eyes & Dirty $) | 4:09 |
| 10. | "Poppi" (performed by Dirty $, Z-Ro & D Gotti) | 4:22 |
| 11. | "Be My Bitcha'" (performed by Big Pokey, Dirty $, D Gotti & Tyte Eyes) | 4:02 |
| 12. | "Shaker/Skit" (performed by Ace-Dawg) | 1:40 |
| 13. | "See Weed Diet" (performed by Dirty $, D Gotti & Tyte Eyes) | 3:26 |
| 14. | "It's On" (performed by Salih Williams & Ronnie Spencer) | 2:28 |
| 15. | "Come Join the Fun/Club" (performed by Big Pokey & Isis Re') | 3:27 |
| 16. | "They Say/Skit" (performed by D-Reck & Ace-Dawg) | 1:49 |
| 17. | "I Swear" (performed by Big Pokey & Trademark) | 3:48 |
| 18. | "Right Now" (performed by Big Pokey, Ace-Dawg & Noke D) | 4:30 |
| 19. | "No" (performed by D Gotti, D-Reck & Noke D) | 3:38 |
| 20. | "Something Wrong" (performed by Big Pokey, Isis Re' & Noke D) | 3:45 |
| Total length: | | 1:00:01 |

== Personnel ==
- Darrell Monroe – performer
- Milton Powell – performer
- Ace-Dawg – performer
- Derrick Haynes – performer, producer, engineering & mixing
- Derrick Dixon – performer, executive producer
- Dirty $ – performer
- Tyson Duplechain – performer
- Isis Re' – performer
- Chad Lamont Butler – performer
- Kenneth Doniell Moore – performer
- Chris Ward – performer
- Joseph Wayne McVey IV – performer
- Ronnie Spencer – performer
- Salih Williams – performer
- Trademark – performer
- André Sargent – producer
- Barry Risper – producer
- Skip Holman – engineering, mixing, mastering

== Chart positions ==
| Chart (2002) | Peak position |
|---|---|
| US Top R&B/Hip-Hop Albums (Billboard) | 74 |
| US Independent Albums (Billboard) | 21 |
| US Heatseekers Albums (Billboard) | 31 |
