= The Commission (album) =

Studio album by Lil' Keke
- Released: March 24, 1998
- Recorded: 1997–1998
- Studio: Jam Down Studio (Houston, TX)
- Genre: Hip-hop
- Length: 59:31
- Label: Jam Down Records; Breakaway Entertainment
- Producer: Patrick Lewis (exec.); Vincent Perry (exec.); Sean "Solo" Jemison; Double D; Prowla; Harvey Luv

Lil' Keke chronology
Don't Mess wit Texas (1997)	The Commission (1998)	It Was All a Dream (1999)

Singles from The Commission
- 1. "Southside" Released: May 27, 1997

Professional ratings
Review scores
Source	Rating
AllMusic	3/5 stars

The Commission is the second studio album by American rapper Lil' Keke from Houston, Texas. It was released on March 24, 1998, via Jam Down Records/Breakaway Entertainment. It contains seven songs of his previous studio album, plus seven new songs. The album peaked at number 176 on the US Billboard 200 chart.

== Track listing ==
No.	Title	Producer(s)	Length
1.	"Southside"	Double D	4:53
2.	"Baller in the Mix" (featuring Herschelwood Hardheadz)	Double D	4:16
3.	"Gettin' Paid"	Prowler	4:45
4.	"Pimps, Players & Hustlas" (featuring Fat Pat & Herschelwood Hardheadz)	Prowler	4:29
5.	"Still Pimpin Pens (Screwed)" (featuring DJ Screw)	Sean "Solo" Jemison	4:04
6.	"Don't You Know" (featuring Madd Hatta & Phaz)	Sean "Solo" Jemison	4:04
7.	"It's Going Down"	Sean "Solo" Jemison	3:57
8.	"Fo Sure" (featuring Herschelwood Hardheadz)	D.J. Harvee Luv	3:46
9.	"Comin' Down" (featuring Phaz)	Double D	4:21
10.	"In the Door" (featuring Mobb Figgaz)	Sean "Solo" Jemison	3:47
11.	"Paper Money"	Sean "Solo" Jemison	4:24
12.	"Bounce and Turn" (featuring Phaz)	Sean "Solo" Jemison	4:24
13.	"Wise Guys" (featuring Mobb Figgaz)	Sean "Solo" Jemison	4:34
14.	"Don't Mess Wit Texas" (featuring Head & Knocky)	Sean "Solo" Jemison	4:03
Total length:			59:31

== Charts ==
Chart (1998)	Peak position
US Billboard 200	176
US Top R&B/Hip-Hop Albums (Billboard)	37
US Heatseekers Albums (Billboard)	13
