= Draped Up =

Single by Bun B featuring Lil' Keke

from the album Trill
- Released: September 6, 2005
- Recorded: 2004
- Genre: Hip hop
- Length: 4:17
- Label: Rap-A-Lot; Asylum; Atlantic
- Songwriters: Bernard Freeman; Salih Williams
- Producer: Salih Williams

Bun B singles chronology
"They Don't Know" (2005)	"Draped Up" (2005)	"Get Throwed" (2005)

Lil' Keke singles chronology
"Southside" (1997)	"Draped Up" (2005)	"Knockin' Doorz Down" (2006)

"Draped Up" is the first single from Bun B's solo debut album Trill. It samples elements from the song "Pimp Tha Pen" by DJ Screw. It features an intro from Lil' Keke, and was produced by Salih Williams. The official remix is on the album and it features Lil' Keke, Slim Thug, Chamillionaire, Paul Wall, Mike Jones, Aztek, Lil Flip, and Z-Ro. The music video features cameo appearances by Chingy, Devin The Dude, Kanye West, Scarface, Spice 1, Paul Wall, Mike Jones, Lil' Keke, Lil' Flip, Slim Thug, Z-Ro, Trae Tha Truth, Aztek, & Birdman. The song topped out at #45 on the U.S. Hot R&B Chart.

== Track listings ==
=== CD ===
1. "Draped Up (Radio Remix)"
2. "Draped Up (Album Remix)"
3. "Draped Up (Instrumental)"

== Charts ==
Chart (2005–2006)	Peak position
U.S. Billboard Hot R&B/Hip-Hop Songs	45
