= Wegonefunkwichamind =

Studio album by Big Mello
- Released: 1994
- Recorded: 1993–1994
- Studios: Ultimate Sounds Studio (Houston, TX); Digital Services (Houston, TX)
- Genre: Hip hop
- Length: 1:12:23
- Label: Rap-A-Lot Records
- Producers: J. Prince (exec.); Big Mello; Crazy C; Mike Dean; Harvee Luv

Big Mello chronology
Bone Hard Zaggin (1992)	Wegonefunkwichamind (1994)	Southside Story (1996)

Professional ratings
Review scores
Source	Rating
AllMusic	3.5/5 stars
RapReviews	7/10

Wegonfunkwichamind is the second studio album by the American rapper Big Mello, from Houston, Texas. It was released in 1994 via Rap-A-Lot Records.

== Track listing ==
No.	Title	Producer(s)	Length
1.	"Intro"	Crazy C	2:29
2.	"Afro's & 84's"	Big Mello	1:37
3.	"Back Do Akshun"	Big Mello	5:33
4.	"No Hidin Place"	Big Mello	5:11
5.	"Da Feva"	Crazy C	2:24
6.	"Wind Me Up" (Remix)	Big Mello; Crazy C; Pee Wee (co.)	4:28
7.	"Charge It 2 Da Game"	Big Mello	4:32
8.	"A Ride 4 Yo Azz"	Mike Dean	2:50
9.	"Funkwichamind"	Crazy C	6:14
10.	"Somethin Serious"	Big Mello; Crazy C	1:55
11.	"Git Some Gone"	Big Mello	3:45
12.	"We Hate Em"	Crazy C	4:21
13.	"Highschool Kat"	Big Mello; Crazy C	2:25
14.	"Dat Killa"	Big Mello; Crazy C	4:57
15.	"Saga Uva Dope Fiend"	Crazy C	4:22
16.	"Family Affair 94"	Big Mello; Crazy C	3:08
17.	"So Much Love"	Big Mello; Crazy C; D.J. Harvey Love (co.)	4:28
18.	"Southside"	Big Mello; Crazy C	8:28

== Personnel ==
- Curtis Donnell Davis – main artist, vocals, producer (tracks: 2–4, 6–7, 10–11, 13–14, 16–18), design & layout
- Simon "Crazy C" Cullins – keyboards, vocoder, mixing, producer (tracks: 1, 5–6, 9–10, 12–18)
- Michael George Dean – lead guitar, bass, Rhodes piano, synthesizer, producer (track 8), mastering
- Corey Stoot – lead guitar, bass
- Terrence 'Bearwolf' Williams – piano, synthesizer
- Mark Gordon – horns
- Vikta Black – backing vocals, drums (track 1)
- Derwinn Parrish "Dirtt" – bass (tracks: 4, 13)
- Preston Middleton – bass (track 16)
- Roger Tausz – bass (tracks: 11–12, 18), mixing
- 'Maestro' John Hillard – horns, assistant engineering
- Harvey Jerome Kelley – co-producer (track 17)
- Troy "Pee Wee" Clark – co-producer (track 6)
- James A. Smith – executive producer
- James Hoover – mixing
- Richard Simpson – engineering & mixing
- Craig Gilmore – assistant engineering
- Patrick Nixon – art direction
- Derril Vallery – photography

== Charts ==
Chart (1994)	Peak position
US Top R&B/Hip-Hop Albums (Billboard)	44
US Heatseekers Albums (Billboard)	37
