= Done Deal (Big Mello album) =

Studio album by Big Mello
- Released: June 15, 2003
- Recorded: 2002–2003
- Genre: Southern hip hop; gangsta rap
- Length: 1:09:41
- Label: Woss Ness Entertainment
- Producer: Big Mello; Big Swift; Chip; Crazy C; Harvee Luv

Big Mello chronology
The Gift (2002)	Done Deal (2003)

Done Deal is the fifth and final studio album by American rapper Big Mello. It was released posthumously in 2003 via Woss Ness Entertainment.

== Track listing ==
No.	Title	Length
1.	"Set the World on Fire" (featuring Harvee Luv & Vikta Black)	5:03
2.	"Outta Control" (featuring Mr. 3-2 & Big Steve)	4:24
3.	"Hey You"	3:44
4.	"Game on Hush" (featuring Vikta Black)	4:12
5.	"Texas Boys" (featuring South Park Mexican & C-Note)	4:14
6.	"Just Sex" (featuring Billy Cook & Devin the Dude)	4:33
7.	"We Know What Girls Like" (featuring Harvee Luv)	3:59
8.	"True Block Bleeders"	5:32
9.	"Game on Lock" (featuring Lil' Kano)	5:07
10.	"So True" (featuring Big Moe & 4 Day G's)	4:11
11.	"Deuce Out the Roof" (featuring Woss Ness)	4:12
12.	"My Shopper"	4:43
13.	"Cold Cold World"	4:31
14.	"Sometimes"	5:40
15.	"Slow Your Role"	5:36
Total length:		1:09:41
