= Da Sky's da Limit =

Da Sky's Da Limit

Studio album by Big Pokey
- Released: August 6, 2002
- Recorded: 2001–2002
- Studio: Wreckshop Studios (Houston, TX)
- Genre: Southern hip-hop
- Length: 72:42
- Label: Wreckshop Records
- Producers: D-Reck (exec.); Noke D; Mike B.; Da Network; Blue; John Brown; Mario Ayala; Red Bird; Red Hair Ses; Sam B; Shadow Black; Tank West; Credits On Contract

Big Pokey chronology
Tha Collabo (2001)	Da Sky's Da Limit (2002)	Mob 4 Life (2003)

Da Sky's Da Limit is the third studio album by American rapper Big Pokey, from Houston, Texas. It was released on August 6, 2002, via Wreckshop Records. The album peaked at #47 on the US Billboard Top R&B/Hip-Hop Albums chart.

== Track listing ==
No.	Title	Producer(s)	Length
1.	"Intro" (102 Bars of Venom)	Noke D	1:41
2.	"M.O.B."	Mike B.; Credits On Contract (co.)	4:29
3.	"Raise 'Em Up" (featuring Lil' O)	Blue	3:00
4.	"Power N' da Flower"	Mike B.	4:12
5.	"My Boo" (featuring Big Moe)	Noke D	4:19
6.	"Ooh!" (featuring D-Reck, Noke D & Tyte Eyes)	Mario Ayala	3:30
7.	"Jump Clean" (featuring Killa Kyleon & Chris Ward)	Sam B	4:56
8.	"He's So Gangsta"	Mike B.	4:24
9.	"Where I'm From (Huggin' da Block)" (featuring Z-Ro)	Noke D	3:38
10.	"Interlube (Sacrifices)" (featuring Ronnie Spencer)	Red Hair Ses	1:34
11.	"Automatic" (featuring Kawleegz)	Da Network	3:18
12.	"Right Now" (featuring Chris Ward)	Da Network	3:06
13.	"Get Out da Way" (featuring Big T & Dirty $)	Noke D	3:41
14.	"Runnin' da Red" (featuring Mobstyle Crew)	Shadow Black	3:15
15.	"Gangsta"	John Brown; Da Network	3:15
16.	"Mackin' on Me" (featuring Toya)	Red Bird	3:55
17.	"Ghetto Fabulous" (featuring D Gotti, Dirty $, Big Moe & Noke D)	Noke D	4:57
18.	"Only You" (featuring T-High)	Mike B.	3:53
19.	"Ain't No Killaz" (featuring Bruce "Grim Reaper" Rhodes, Chris Ward & Toya)	Tank West; Da Network	4:12
20.	"Outro" (102 Bars of Venom)	Noke D	1:47
Total length:			1:12:42

== Chart positions ==
Chart (2002)	Peak position
US Top R&B/Hip-Hop Albums (Billboard)	47
US Independent Albums (Billboard)	46
US Heatseekers Albums (Billboard)	46
