= Southside Story (Big Mello album) =

Studio album by Big Mello
- Released: August 13, 1996
- Recorded: 1995–1996
- Studio: R.B.'s Crib
- Genre: Gangsta rap
- Length: 1:12:19
- Label: N-Terrorgation Records
- Producer: Ronald Bookman (exec.); Mo' Dangerous; Big Mello

Big Mello chronology
Wegonefunkwichamind (1994)	Southside Story (1996)	The Gift (2002)

Southside Story is the third studio album by American rapper Big Mello from Houston, Texas. It was released on August 13, 1996 via N-Terrorgation Records, and became the rapper's last album before he went on hiatus until 2002 and then died on June 15, 2002.

== Track listing ==
No.	Title	Length
1.	"Intro"	3:17
2.	"Da A.P.T."	5:42
3.	"Stackin' Paper" (featuring Edie & Mo' Dangerous)	5:53
4.	"Sucka Free"	4:30
5.	"Fancy Thangz" (featuring Fliponya & 2-Fancy)	4:16
6.	"Gotz ta Get Ova"	5:07
7.	"Flossin'" (featuring Black Nat)	5:15
8.	"Knock, Knock" (featuring 2-Fancy)	4:43
9.	"Niggaz Been Lyin'"	3:19
10.	"Strapped Assassin"	4:29
11.	"Too Much Stress"	3:58
12.	"Gotta Hold On"	4:55
13.	"Hittin' Lyxx" (featuring 2-Fancy)	4:06
14.	"Don't Scream"	4:07
15.	"You Can't Run"	4:51
16.	"We Brangz Da Drama" (featuring Klondike Kat & 2-Fancy)	3:51
Total length:		1:12:19

== Personnel ==
- Curtis Donnell Davis – main artist, vocals, co-producer, mixing
- Mo' Dangerous – background vocals, producer, mixing
- Ronald Bookman – engineering, mixing, executive producer
- Steven "Dope E" Baggett – scratches
- Steve Ames – mixing
- Clyde Bazile, Jr. – art direction
- Deron Neblett – photography
