= Wanna Be a Baller =

Single by Lil' Troy featuring Fat Pat, Yungstar, Lil' Wil, Big T and H.A.W.K.

from the album Sittin' Fat Down South
- Released: 1999
- Genre: Hip hop
- Length: 5:55 (album version): 3:39 (radio edit)
- Label: Universal; Republic; Short Stop
- Songwriters: Troy Lane Birklett; John Hawkins; Patrick L. Hawkins; Jarvis Lemon; Terence Glen Prejean; Bruce Isaac Rhodes
- Producer: Bruce "Grim" Rhodes

Lil' Troy singles chronology
"Small Time" (1998)	"Wanna Be a Baller" (1999)	"Where's the Love" (1999)

"Wanna Be a Baller" is a single by American hip-hop artist Lil' Troy featuring Fat Pat, Yungstar, Lil' Will, Big T and H.A.W.K. It was released in 1999 as the second single from his debut major label studio album Sittin' Fat Down South. The song peaked at number 70 on the Billboard Hot 100 music chart.

Lil' Troy wrote but did not perform in the song.

The track features a chord pattern reminiscent of "Little Red Corvette" by Prince.

== Legacy ==
This song has had an unfortunate legacy as almost everyone featured on this song has died at a relative early age. Fat Pat was murdered February 3, 1998, almost one year prior to the song's release. (Fat Pat's verse originally appeared on the Mass 187 song "So Real So Tight" on the Krooked City album in 1997; his posthumous 2001 greatest hits album featured the song as the 9th track under the slightly altered title "Wanna Be A Balla.) On May 1, 2006, Big Hawk, who filled in for his brother Fat Pat for the video shoot, was also murdered. Lil' Troy's cousin Lil' Will died in a car accident in February 2016. Big T, who contributed vocals for the song's hook, died May 8, 2018, of a suspected heart attack.

Yungstar, a Houston-area mixtape legend, and Lil Troy are the only survivors, with Yungstar still active performing and featuring on other artist's songs while Lil Troy became a truck driver, forming Birklett Trucking Company.

The song, based off the Usher song "My Way", is featured on the soundtrack of NBA 2K19, which was curated by rapper Travis Scott.

In 2025, the song was featured again in NBA 2K26.

== Charts ==
Chart (1999)	Peak position
U.S. Billboard Hot 100	70
U.S. Billboard Hot R&B/Hip-Hop Singles & Tracks	40
U.S. Billboard Hot Rap Singles	31
U.S. Billboard Rhythmic Top 40	1
U.S. Billboard Top 40 Tracks	36
