= Trill (album) =

Studio album by Bun B
- Released: October 18, 2005
- Recorded: 2004–05
- Studios: Studio 7303 (Houston, TX); PatchWerk Recording Studios (Atlanta, GA); Stankonia Studios (Atlanta, GA)
- Genre: Southern hip-hop
- Length: 73:52
- Labels: J. Prince; Rap-A-Lot 4 Life; Asylum
- Producers: Bigg Tyme; Cory Mo; Jazze Pha; John Bido; KLC; Lil Jon; Maejor; Mannie Fresh; Mike Dean; Mr. Collipark; Mr. Lee; Salih Williams; Sean Wee; Trey Songz; Travis Barker

Bun B chronology
Trill (2005)	II Trill (2008)

Singles from Trill
- 1. "Draped Up" Released: September 6, 2005; 2. "Get Throwed" Released: December 6, 2005; 3. "Git It" Released: January 24, 2006

Trill is the debut solo studio album by American rapper Bun B. It was released on October 18, 2005, through Rap-A-Lot Records and Asylum Records. Recording sessions took place at Studio 7303 in Houston and at PatchWerk Recording Studios and Stankonia Studios in Atlanta. Production was handled by Mr. Lee, Mannie Fresh, Salih Williams, Bigg Tyme, Cory Mo, Jazze Pha, John Bido, KLC, Lil Jon, Maejor, Mike Dean, Mr. Collipark, Sean Wee, Trey Songz and Travis Barker. It features guest appearances from Lil' Keke, Mike Jones, Young Jeezy, Z-Ro, Aztek, Birdman, Chamillionaire, Jay-Z, Jazze Pha, J. Prince, Juvenile, Lil' Flip, Ludacris, Mannie Fresh, Mddl Fngz, Paul Wall, Pimp C, Scarface, Slim Thug, T.I., Too $hort, Trey Songz, Ying Yang Twins and Skinhead Rob.

The album debuted at number six on the Billboard 200, with first-week sales of 118,000 copies in the United States. It was certified Gold by the Recording Industry Association of America on March 20, 2006 for selling 500,000 units in the US alone.

It was supported with the singles "Draped Up", the 'H-Town Mix' version of which peaked at No. 45 on the Hot R&B/Hip-Hop Songs chart, a promotional single "Hold U Down", which made it to No. 106 on the Hot R&B/Hip-Hop Songs, "Get Throwed", which reached No. 49 on the Hot R&B/Hip-Hop Songs, and "Git It", which made it to No. 101 on the Billboard Hot 100 and No. 109 on the Hot R&B/Hip-Hop Songs.

== Critical reception ==
Professional ratings
Review scores
Source	Rating
AllMusic	4/5 stars
Blender	4/5 stars
HipHopDX	4/5
Pitchfork	6.9/10
RapReviews	8.5/10
Spin	B+

== Track listing ==
No.	Title	Writer(s)	Producer(s)	Length
1.	"Inauguration" (featuring J. Prince)	Bernard Freeman; James Prince; Cory Moore	Cory Mo	1:51
2.	"Bun"	Freeman; Craig Lawson	KLC	4:06
3.	"Get Throwed" (featuring Pimp C, Z-Ro, Young Jeezy and Jay-Z)	Freeman; Chad Butler; Joseph McVey; Jay Jenkins; Shawn Carter; Leroy Williams	Mr. Lee	3:53
4.	"Draped Up" (featuring Lil' Keke)	Freeman; Salih Williams	Salih Williams	4:16
5.	"I'm Fresh" (featuring Mannie Fresh)	Freeman; Byron Thomas; Sean Paul Joseph	Mannie Fresh	4:16
6.	"Trill Recognize Trill" (featuring Ludacris)	Freeman; Christopher Bridges; Jonathan Smith	Lil' Jon	5:24
7.	"Pushin'" (featuring Scarface and Young Jeezy)	Freeman; Brad Jordan; Jenkins; L. Williams; Curtis Mayfield	Mr. Lee	4:41
8.	"I'm Ballin'" (featuring Jazze Pha)	Freeman; Phalon Alexander; Zachary Wallace	Jazze Pha	4:20
9.	"What I Represent (UGK)"	Freeman; Thomas	Mannie Fresh	4:39
10.	"The Story"	Freeman; John Okuribido; James Jamerson Jr.; David Williams	John Bido	5:55
11.	"Hold U Down" (featuring Trey Songz, Mike Jones and Baby)	Freeman; Tremaine Neverson; Michael Jones; Bryan Williams; Brandon Green	Trey Songz; Maejor	4:19
12.	"I'm a "G"" (featuring T.I.)	Freeman; Clifford Harris; L. Williams; Michael Dean	Mr. Lee; Mike Dean	4:09
13.	"Git It" (featuring Ying Yang Twins)	Freeman; De'Angelo Holmes; Eric Jackson; Michael Crooms; Luther Campbell; David Hobbs; Mark Ross; Christopher Wong Won	Mr. Collipark	3:57
14.	"Who Need a "B"" (featuring Too $hort and Juvenile)	Freeman; Todd Shaw; Terius Gray; Randy Jefferson	Bigg Tyme	4:40
15.	"Retaliation Is a Must" (featuring Mddl Fngz)	Freeman; Sean Wheelock; M. Grisby; Anthony Bowser; A. Stephenson	Sean Wee	3:48
16.	"Draped Up (H-Town Mix)" (featuring Lil' Keke, Slim Thug, Chamillionaire, Paul Wall, Mike Jones, Aztek, Z-Ro and Lil' Flip)	Freeman; Marcus Edwards; Stayve Thomas; Paul Slayton; Hakeem Sereki; Jones; Miguel Gomez; Wesley Weston; McVey; S. Williams	Salih Williams	5:11
17.	"Late Night Creepin' (Bonus Track)" (featuring Skinhead Rob and Travis Barker)	Freeman; Rob Aston; Travis Landon Barker	Travis Barker	4:27
Total length:				1:13:52

Sample credits

- Track 7 contains a sample of "Keep On Pushing" performed by The Impressions.
- Track 10 contains a sample of "All The Time You Need" performed by Chanson.
- Track 13 contains an interpolation of "Get It Girl" and "Throw That D" performed by the 2 Live Crew.
- Track 14 contains a sample of "Dope Fiend Beat" performed by Too $hort.

== Charts ==
=== Weekly charts ===
Chart (2005)	Peak position
US Billboard 200	6
US Top R&B/Hip-Hop Albums (Billboard)	1

=== Year-end charts ===
Chart (2005)	Position
US Top R&B/Hip-Hop Albums (Billboard)	63
Chart (2006)	Position
US Top R&B/Hip-Hop Albums (Billboard)	50

== Certifications ==
Region	Certification	Certified units/sales
United States (RIAA)	Gold	500,000^{^}
^{^} Shipments figures based on certification alone.

== See also ==
- List of Billboard number-one R&B/hip-hop albums of 2005
