= Bone Hard Zaggin =

- Chopped & Screwed edition

Studio album by Big Mello
- Released: September 4, 1992
- Recorded: 1991–1992
- Studio: Sound Arts Recording Studio (Houston, TX)
- Genre: Hip hop
- Label: Rap-A-Lot Records
- Producer: J. Prince (exec.); Cliff Blodget (exec.); Crazy C; Big Mello; Harvee Luv

Big Mello chronology
Bone Hard Zaggin (1992)	Wegonefunkwichamind (1994)

Professional ratings
Review scores
Source	Rating
AllMusic	2/5 stars

Bone Hard Zaggin (stylized BONE HARD ZAGGiИ) is the debut studio album by American rapper Big Mello from Houston, Texas. It was released on September 4, 1992 via Rap-A-Lot Records.

== Track listing ==
No.	Title	Producer(s)	Length
1.	"Intro" (featuring J. Prince)	Crazy C; Big Mello (co.)	1:03
2.	"Bone Hard Zaggin"	Crazy C; Big Mello (co.)	6:38
3.	"Don't Let the Name Fool You"	Crazy C; Big Mello (co.)	5:36
4.	"Creepin' in a 'Lac"	Crazy C; Big Mello (co.)	0:09
5.	"Mac's Drive 'Lac's"	Crazy C; Big Mello (co.)	5:22
6.	"Love Don't Love Nobody"	Crazy C; Big Mello (co.)	4:58
7.	"Creepin' in a 'Lac II"	Crazy C; Big Mello (co.)	0:04
8.	"Gank Move"	Crazy C; Big Mello (co.)	5:43
9.	"Symptoms of a Crook"	Big Mello; D.J. Harvee Luv; Crazy C (co.)	4:29
10.	"Fuck a Bitch" (Skit)	Crazy C; Big Mello (co.)	0:05
11.	"Prime Time Live"	Big Mello; D.J. Harvee Luv; Crazy C (co.)	6:09
12.	"Living for the Weekend"	Crazy C; Big Mello (co.)	3:46
13.	"Live in 3-D"	Crazy C; Big Mello (co.)	3:48
14.	"Playin' the Game"	Crazy C; Big Mello (co.)	4:48
15.	"I Don't Trust 'Em" (featuring Convicts & Icy Hott)	Crazy C; Big Mello (co.)	5:55
16.	"After Dark in the Clarke"	Crazy C; Big Mello (co.)	1:34
17.	"Conversation Rules the Nation" (featuring Lez Moné)	Crazy C; Big Mello (co.)	2:35
18.	"Straight From the Clarke" (featuring Convicts, Bone Hard Productions & Icy Hott)	Crazy C; Big Mello (co.)	8:08
19.	"Bone Hard Thanks"	Crazy C; Big Mello (co.)	2:54

== Personnel ==
- Curtis Donnell Davis – main artist, vocals, co-producer
- Mark "Icy Hott" McCardell – guest vocals (tracks: 15, 18)
- Christopher "3-2" Barriere – guest vocals (tracks: 15, 18)
- Michael "Big Mike" Barnett – guest vocals (tracks: 15, 18)
- Simon "Crazy C" Cullins – guest vocals (track 18), keyboards, mixing, producer, presenter
- Harvey Jerome Kelley – guest vocals (track 18), scratches, producer, presenter
- James A. Smith – guest vocals (track 1), executive producer
- Leslie "Lez Moné" Hall – guest vocals (track 17)
- Cliff Blodget – executive producer
- Peter Reardon – engineering, production coordinator, art direction
- Richard Simpson – engineering
- Tony "Big Chief" Randle – production coordinator
- Mike Burnett – art direction, photography
- Kevin Bakos – artwork
- Rick Saenz – artwork

== Charts ==
Chart (1992)	Peak position
US Top R&B/Hip-Hop Albums (Billboard)	96
