= The Gift (Big Mello album) =

Studio album by Big Mello
- Released: July 29, 2002
- Recorded: 2001–2002
- Genre: Hip hop
- Length: 52:18
- Label: KMJ Records
- Producer: Big Mello; Q-Stone

Big Mello chronology
Southside Story (1996)	The Gift (2002)	Done Deal (2003)

The Gift is the fourth studio album by American rapper Big Mello from Houston, Texas. It was released on July 29, 2002 via small record label KMJ Records. This album is considered one of Big Mello's greatest achievements. It was his first posthumous album as well as his first album after a long hiatus. The song "Miss My Niggas" is dedicated to Mello's late friend Sheldon.

== Track listing ==
No.	Title	Producer(s)	Length
1.	"Intro"	Big Mello	0:44
2.	"Serious"	Big Mello; Q-Stone	3:59
3.	"What Goes Around"	Big Mello; Q-Stone	3:35
4.	"Knock"	Big Mello; Q-Stone	4:45
5.	"Playa Made"	Q-Stone	3:57
6.	"Party on the Dance Floor"	Big Mello; Q-Stone	3:24
7.	"Show Your I.D."	Big Mello	3:47
8.	"Bone Hard" (featuring D-Man & Scoopastar)	Big Mello	3:33
9.	"What It Do" (featuring Cl'che)	Big Mello; Q-Stone	3:54
10.	"Crazy Game"	Big Mello; Q-Stone	3:33
11.	"Bump Too Much" (featuring Trae & Tony Montana)	Big Mello; Q-Stone	3:23
12.	"KMJ Killas" (featuring Trae, Cl'che & Dougie D)	Big Mello; Q-Stone	4:04
13.	"Southside" (featuring Z-Ro, Trae, Ghetto & Cl'che)	Big Mello; Q-Stone	4:59
14.	"Miss My Niggas"	Big Mello; Q-Stone	4:41
Total length:			52:18

== Personnel ==
- Curtis Donnell Davis – main artist, vocals, producer
- Quincy "Q-Stone" Whetstone – producer
- James Hoover – mixing
- John Moran – mastering
