= Secrets of the Hidden Temple =

Studio album by Blac Monks
- Released: September 13, 1994
- Studios: Jungle Style Studios (Houston, TX); Digital Services (Houston, TX); Bushwick's Bob Room
- Genre: Southern hip-hop
- Length: 59:56
- Label: Rap-A-Lot Records
- Producers: J. Prince (exec.); John Bido (also exec.); Troy "Pee Wee" Clark; Blac Monks; DJ Ready Red

Blac Monks chronology
Secrets of the Hidden Temple (1994)	No Mercy (1998)

Professional ratings
Review scores
Source	Rating
AllMusic	3/5 stars

Secrets of the Hidden Temple is the debut studio album by American hip-hop group Blac Monks, which consisted of Houston-based rappers Mr. 3-2, D.A. and Awol. It was released on September 13, 1994, through Rap-A-Lot Records. Production on the album was done by John Bido, Troy Clark and DJ Ready Red. The album peaked at number 65 on the US Billboard Top R&B/Hip-Hop Albums chart.

== Track listing ==
No.	Title	Length
1.	"Blac Monk Intro"	3:19
2.	"Aggravated Monkeys"	3:27
3.	"Zillion Ways to Die"	4:23
4.	"Death Before Dishonor"	5:41
5.	"Secrets of the Hidden Temple"	5:15
6.	"Rumble in the Jungle"	4:47
7.	"Buddah Nature"	5:16
8.	"Getos in the Mind"	4:21
9.	"Doin It Jungle Style"	4:21
10.	"Who Will Bell the Cat"	5:24
11.	"Monks in the Jungle"	3:48
12.	"Straight Madness"	4:27
13.	"Outro"	4:21
14.	"1995"	1:06
Total length:		59:56

== Charts ==
Chart (1994)	Peak position
US Top R&B/Hip-Hop Albums (Billboard)	65
