= Southside (Lil' Keke song) =

Single by Lil' Keke

from the album Don't Mess wit Texas
- Released: May 27, 1997
- Genre: Hip-hop
- Length: 4:52
- Label: Jam Down
- Producer: Double D

Lil' Keke singles chronology
| "Southside" (1997) | "Draped Up" (2005) |

"Southside" is a hit single of Houston rapper Lil' Keke on his debut album, Don't Mess Wit Texas. The song was produced by Double D. A video was produced in 1998, directed by Marty Thomas, with the 'southside dance'. The song samples "Friends" by Whodini. There is also a remix made with Memphis rapper 8Ball on Lil' Keke's third album, It Was All A Dream.

== Charts ==
| Chart (1998) | Peak position |
|---|---|
| U.S. Billboard Hot R&B/Hip-Hop Singles & Tracks | 55 |
| U.S. Billboard Hot Rap Singles | 28 |
