= No Mercy (Blac Monks album) =

Studio album by Blac Monks
- Released: May 19, 1998
- Studios: Jungle Style Studios (Houston, TX); Hippie House Studios (Houston, TX); Temple Studios (Houston, TX); The Enterprise
- Genre: Gangsta rap
- Length: 50:07
- Label: Rap-A-Lot Records
- Producers: J. Prince (exec.); John Bido (also exec.); Wendell Springer; Mike Dean; Troy "Pee Wee" Clark; David Forrest; Itche; Jerry Muhammad; Scarface

Blac Monks chronology
Secrets of the Hidden Temple (1994)	No Mercy (1998)

Professional ratings
Review scores
Source	Rating
AllMusic	4/5 stars

No Mercy is the second and final studio album by American hip-hop group Blac Monks, which consisted of Houston-based rappers Mr. 3-2, D.A., Awol, Assata Tafari & Raheem. It was released on May 19, 1998, through Rap-A-Lot Records. The album peaked at number 74 on the US Billboard Top R&B/Hip-Hop Albums chart.

== Track listing ==
No.	Title	Producer(s)	Length
1.	"Intro"		1:05
2.	"Caged in Gorillas"	John Bido	4:22
3.	"Steppin With Your Weapon"	John Bido; Troy "Pee Wee" Clark	4:46
4.	"Paper Chase" (featuring Papa Reu)	Itche	5:13
5.	"Enemy Within" (featuring Darrell Mark Tall)	John Bido	5:26
6.	"Marked for Death"	John Bido	3:28
7.	"Monk Mentality"	Wendell Springer	5:13
8.	"Jungle Funk" (featuring Kimberly Smith)	John Bido; Scarface	4:41
9.	"Natural Herbs & Spices"	Wendell Springer	4:36
10.	"God Complex"	John Bido	3:56
11.	"No Mercy"	Jerry Muhammad	4:07
12.	"Young Guns" (featuring Endo & Makesha)	John Bido; Mike Dean	3:10
13.	"Grim Reaper"	John Bido; Mike Dean; David Forrest	1:09
Total length:			50:07

== Charts ==
Chart (1998)	Peak position
US Top R&B/Hip-Hop Albums (Billboard)	74
