= Blac Monks =

American southern hip-hop group

- Origin: Houston, Texas. U.S.
- Genre: Southern hip-hop
- Years active: 1993–1998
- Label: Rap-A-Lot Records
- Past members: AWOL (deceased) D.A. Assata; Raheem; Mr. 3-2 (deceased)

Blac Monks was an American southern hip-hop group from Houston, Texas, consisting of Mr. 3-2, D.A. and Awol. In 1994, they released their debut album Secrets of the Hidden Temple via Rap-A-Lot Records, which also featured Quiet Storm (Assata Tafari) on the single "Buddha Nature". Assata and Raheem joined the group to release their sophomore album No Mercy.

== Discography ==
=== Studio albums ===
Title	Release	Peak chart positions	
Title	Release	US	US R&B
Secrets of the Hidden Temple	Released: 1994; Label: Rap-A-Lot	—	65
No Mercy	Released: 1998; Label: Rap-A-Lot	—	74

== See also ==
- Houston hip-hop
