= The Big Unit (album) =

Studio album by Lil' Keke & Slim Thug
- Released: July 8, 2003
- Recorded: 2003
- Studio: Noddfactor Studios (Houston, Texas)
- Genre: Southern hip hop
- Length: 1:00:09
- Label: Noddfactor Entertainment
- Producers: Mr. Lee (also exec.); Mike Dean

Lil' Keke chronology
Street Stories (2003)	The Big Unit (2003)	Changin' Lanes (2003)

Slim Thug chronology
Boss Hogg Outlaws (2001)	The Big Unit (2003)	Already Platinum (2005)

The Big Unit is a collaborative studio album by American rappers Lil' Keke and Slim Thug. It was released on July 8, 2003, via Noddfactor Entertainment. The album peaked at number 37 on the US Billboard Top R&B/Hip-Hop Albums chart.

== Track listing ==
No.	Title	Producer(s)	Length
1.	"Intro"		0:59
2.	"Dirty" (featuring DJ DMD)	Mr. Lee	4:16
3.	"Ain't Nothin' Like"	Mr. Lee	4:51
4.	"Southern Nigga" (featuring 8Ball)	Mr. Lee	4:50
5.	"Practice" (Skit)		0:31
6.	"Weak Talk"	Mr. Lee	4:03
7.	"Gangstas"	Mr. Lee; Mike Dean	3:59
8.	"Bout That"	Mr. Lee	3:38
9.	"Fake Niggaz"		2:18
10.	"Point 'Em Out"	Mr. Lee	4:28
11.	"Make It Touch Da Floor" (featuring Tela)	Mr. Lee	4:53
12.	"My Life"	Mr. Lee	4:48
13.	"Oh Buddy" (featuring Bun B)	Mr. Lee	3:32
14.	"In Da Club" (featuring Killa Kyleon)	Mr. Lee	4:00
15.	"This Is How We Do" (featuring Late Nite Magic)	Mr. Lee; Mike Dean	4:25
16.	"Noddfactor" (featuring Sir Daily)	Mr. Lee	3:37
17.	"Outro"		1:01
Total length:			1:00:09

== Personnel ==
- Marcus Lakee Edwards – vocals (tracks: 1–6, 8–17)
- Stayve Jerome Thomas – vocals (tracks: 1–11, 13–17)
- Dorie Lee Dorsey – vocals (track 2)
- Premro Smith – vocals (track 4)
- Eric Taylor – vocals (track 10)
- Winston Taylor Rogers – vocals (track 11)
- Bernard Freeman – vocals (track 13)
- Kyle Riley – vocals (track 14)
- T. Harris – vocals (track 16)
- Leroy Williams Jr. – producer (tracks: 2–4, 6–8, 10–16), executive producer
- Michael George Dean – producer (tracks: 7, 15), mastering
- Lee Hines – engineering
- Mike Moore – engineering
- Tony Laughlin – engineering

== Charts ==
Chart (2003)	Peak position
US Top R&B/Hip-Hop Albums (Billboard)	37
