= Don't Mess wit Texas =

Studio album by Lil' Keke
- Released: June 17, 1997
- Recorded: 1996–1997
- Genre: Hip hop
- Length: 1:07:15
- Label: Jam Down Records
- Producer: Patrick Lewis (exec.); Vincent Perry (exec.); Sean "Solo" Jemison; Double D

Lil' Keke chronology
Don't Mess wit Texas (1997)	The Commission (1998)

Singles from Don't Mess wit Texas
- 1. "Southside" Released: May 27, 1997

Professional ratings
Review scores
Source	Rating
AllMusic	3/5 stars

Don't Mess wit Texas is the debut studio album by American rapper Lil' Keke, from Houston, Texas. It was released on June 17, 1997, via Jam Down Records. It was reissued in 2004 by another Houston-based record label, Rap Classics. There is also a chopped and screwed version available with a different cover.

The album peaked at No. 43 on the Top R&B/Hip-Hop Albums in US Billboard charts and spawned a hit single, "Southside".

== Track listing ==
No.	Title	Producer(s)	Length
1.	"Still Pimpin Pens (Screwed)"	Sean "Solo" Jemison	3:58
2.	"Don't You Know" (featuring Phaz & Madd Hatta)	Sean "Solo" Jemison	4:14
3.	"It's Going Down"	Sean "Solo" Jemison	4:07
4.	"Something About the Southside" (featuring Mr. 3-2)	Sean "Solo" Jemison	4:40
5.	"Money in the Making" (featuring Herschelwood Hardheadz)	Double D	3:57
6.	"Serious Smoke" (featuring Big Moe, Duke & Mike D)	Double D	6:17
7.	"Don't Mess Wit Texas" (featuring Head & Knocky)	Sean "Solo" Jemison	3:59
8.	"South Side"	Double D	4:50
9.	"Bounce and Turn" (featuring Phaz)	Sean "Solo" Jemison	4:21
10.	"If You Wanna"	Double D	5:37
11.	"Niggas Be Hating Me" (featuring Double D)	Double D	3:46
12.	"Baller in the Mix" (featuring Herschelwood Hardheadz)	Double D	4:11
13.	"Can You Feel Me" (featuring Al-D & Fat Pat)	Double D	3:54
14.	"All in the Game"	Sean "Solo" Jemison	4:25
15.	"Still Pimpin Pens"	Sean "Solo" Jemison	3:08
Total length:			1:07:15

Sample credits

- "Something About the Southside" contains elements from "Let's Ride" by Richie Rich
- "Serious Smoke" contains elements from "Love's Train" by Con Funk Shun
- "Southside" contains elements from "Friends" by Whodini
- "Bounce and Turn" contains elements from "Turn Your Love Around" by George Benson
- "If You Wanna" contains elements from "Float On" by The Floaters

== Personnel ==
- Marcus Lakee Edwards – main artist
- Christopher "Duke" Bridges – featured artist (tracks: 5, 6, 12)
- Luke Bridges – featured artist (tracks: 5, 7, 12)
- Archie "Lee" Harris – featured artist (tracks: 5, 12)
- C. Huey – featured artist (tracks: 2, 9)
- Ben Thompson – featured artist (track 2)
- Christopher Barriere – featured artist (track 4)
- Kenneth Moore – featured artist (track 6)
- Michael Dixon – featured artist (track 6)
- N. Randall – featured artist (track 7)
- André Sargent – featured artist (track 11), producer (tracks: 5, 6, 8, 10–13)
- Albert Davis – featured artist (track 13)
- Patrick Hawkins – featured artist (track 13)
- Sean Jemison – producer (tracks: 1–4, 7, 9, 14, 15)
- Mark Kidney – engineering & mixing
- John Moran – mastering
- Patrick Lewis – executive producer
- Vincent Perry – executive producer

== Charts ==
Chart (1997)	Peak position
US Top R&B/Hip-Hop Albums (Billboard)	43
US Heatseekers Albums (Billboard)	20
