= Loved by Few, Hated by Many (Lil' Keke album) =

Studio album by Lil' Keke
- Released: November 18, 2008
- Recorded: 2007–2008
- Genre: Hip hop
- Length: 52:44
- Label: TF Records; SRC; Universal Motown
- Producer: T. Farris (exec.); Mr. Lee; X-Fyle; Bangladesh; Beanz N Kornbread; Bruce Bang; J-Cutt

Lil' Keke chronology
| Still Wreckin' (2008) | Loved by Few, Hated by Many (2008) | Heart of a Hustla (2012) |

Professional ratings
Review scores
| Source | Rating |
|---|---|
| HipHopDX | 2/5 stars |
| RapReviews | 5/10 stars |

Loved by Few, Hated by Many is the eleventh solo studio album (and mainstream debut) by American rapper Lil' Keke from Houston, Texas. After being delayed for more than two years, it was released on November 18, 2008 through TF Records, SRC Records and Universal Motown Records.

The album includes the singles "I'm a G" featuring Birdman, "Money in the City" featuring Slim Thug, Paul Wall & Tre Virdure, "What It's Made For" and "She Love Gangstas".

== Track listing ==
| No. | Title | Producer(s) | Length |
|---|---|---|---|
| 1. | "Act A Fool With It" | Mr. Lee | 3:46 |
| 2. | "Boss" (featuring Miss Asiah) | Mr. Lee | 3:37 |
| 3. | "Money In the City" (featuring Slim Thug, Paul Wall & Tre Virdure) | Mr. Lee | 3:55 |
| 4. | "Miss My Boyz" (featuring Crys Wall) | J-Cutt | 3:20 |
| 5. | "4 Doors and Coupes" | X-Fyle | 4:12 |
| 6. | "I'm a G" (featuring Birdman) | Mr. Lee | 4:07 |
| 7. | "What It's Made For" (featuring Blak) | Bangladesh | 4:35 |
| 8. | "Phenomenal" (featuring Tre Virdure) | X-Fyle | 4:30 |
| 9. | "She Love Gangsta's" | Mr. Lee | 4:03 |
| 10. | "Suga Daddy" (featuring Vlissa Martinez) | Bruce Bang | 3:43 |
| 11. | "Traffic Slowed Down" (featuring Pinc Gator) | Beanz & Kornbread | 4:37 |
| 12. | "Scholarships 2 The Pen" | X-Fyle | 3:18 |
| 13. | "Slab Holiday" (featuring Crys Wall) | Mr. Lee | 5:01 |
| 14. | "Fly as a Mutha" (iTunes bonus track) | | 4:20 |
| Total length: | | | 52:44 |

== Chart positions ==
| Chart (2008) | Peak position |
|---|---|
| US Billboard 200 | 120 |
| US Top R&B/Hip-Hop Albums (Billboard) | 22 |
| US Top Rap Albums (Billboard) | 8 |
| US Heatseekers Albums (Billboard) | 4 |
