= Big Mello =

American rapper (1968–2002)

Background information
- Also known as: Big Mello; Big Mellow; Mello; Curtis Davis
- Born: Curtis Donnell Davis; August 7, 1968
- Origin: Houston, Texas, U.S.
- Died: June 15, 2002 (aged 33)
- Genres: Hip-hop; Southern hip-hop; Gangsta rap
- Occupation: Rapper
- Years active: 1991–2002
- Labels: Rap-a-Lot Records; KMJ Records; N-Terrogation; Woss Ness Entertainment
- Formerly of: Screwed Up Click

Curtis Donnell Davis (August 7, 1968 – June 15, 2002), better known by his stage name Big Mello, was an American rapper from Houston, Texas.

Mello graduated from Madison High School, and in the early 1980s, he attended Texas Southern University, studying music and broadcasting. Mello would go on to sign to J. Prince's Rap-A-Lot Records label and debuted in 1992 with the album Bone Hard Zaggin and then in 1994 with Wegonefunkwichamind.

Shea Serrano of the Houston Press said that Big Mello was famous for "repping Hiram Clarke in the 90s[...]".

On June 15, 2002, Davis, along with a passenger, died after Davis lost control of his vehicle and hit a pillar in the 4500 block of South Loop West (South Interstate Highway 610).

== Discography ==
- 1992: Bone Hard Zaggin
- 1994: Wegonefunkwichamind
- 1996: Southside Story
- 2002: The Gift
- 2003: Done Deal

== See also ==
- Houston hip-hop
