= Lil' Troy =

American rapper from Texas

- Born: Troy Lane Birklett; February 24, 1966 (age 60); Houston, Texas, U.S.
- Genres: Hip Hop
- Occupations: Rapper; songwriter; truck driver
- Years active: 1986–present
- Labels: Short Stop; E1; Universal Republic

Troy Lane Birklett (born February 24, 1966), known professionally as Lil' Troy, is an American rapper and songwriter.

== Early life ==
Birklett was born in Houston and grew up there.

== Career ==
=== Early career ===
In 1987, Troy Birklett founded Short Stop and joined the group Mass 187 in 1987. Mass 187's song "Gangsta Strut" was featured on local radio. He was arrested in November 1999 and sent to a federal detention center in Beaumont, Texas west of Orange. He was there nine months.

=== Wanna Be a Baller and later career ===
In the late 1990s, Lil' Troy featured many of Houston's rappers in his songs. He reached national audiences with his single "Wanna Be a Baller". The song reached No. 70 on the Billboard Hot 100, and propelled Sittin' Fat Down South, his debut album on his Shortstop/Me & Mine Entertainment label, to the Top 25 albums on the Billboard 200. After the success of the lead single, Lil' Troy was picked up by Universal Music Group, which re-released his debut album in 1999 with national distribution. The debut album was a success; it was certified Platinum by the RIAA selling 1.9 million copies in the US. Lil' Troy released a follow up in 2001, titled Back to Ballin. The album did not have a charting single and did not fare nearly as well as his debut. He released his third album, Paperwork, in 2006.

Lil' Troy later became a truck driver, forming Birklett Trucking Company in Missouri City, Texas west of Pearland.

== Discography ==
=== Albums ===
Year	Title	Chart positions			Certifications
Year	Title	US	US R&B	US Ind	Certifications
1998	Sittin' Fat Down South: Released: June 23, 1998; Labels: Republic/Universal/Short Stop	20	6	–	US: Platinum
2001	Back to Ballin: Released: September 11, 2001; Label: Koch/Short Stop/Me & Mine Entertainment	95	24	4	
2006	Paperwork: Released: February 14, 2006; Label: Short Stop/101	–	–	–	

=== Singles ===
Year	Title	Chart positions			Album
Year	Title	US	US R&B	US Rap	Album
1998	"Small Time"	–	–	–	Sittin' Fat Down South
1999	"Wanna Be a Baller" (featuring Fat Pat, Yungstar, Lil' Will, and H.A.W.K.)	70	40	31	Sittin' Fat Down South
1999	"Where's the Love" (feat. Willie D & Ardis)	–	–	–	Sittin' Fat Down South
2001	"We Gon' Lean"	—	—	—	Back to Ballin
2001	"Back to Ballin"	–	–	–	Back to Ballin
