= Big Hawk =

American rapper (1969–2006)

- Hawkins in 2005

Background information
- Also known as: H.A.W.K.; Hawk; Five Star General of the Screwed Up Click
- Born: John Edward Hawkins; November 15, 1969; Houston, Texas, U.S.
- Died: May 1, 2006 (aged 36) Houston, Texas, U.S.
- Genre: Hip-hop
- Occupation: Rapper
- Years active: 1992–2006
- Labels: Dead End; Ghetto Dreams
- Formerly of: Screwed Up Click

John Edward Hawkins (November 15, 1969 – May 1, 2006), better known by his stage names Big Hawk and H.A.W.K., was an American rapper from Houston, Texas and a founding member of the late DJ Screw's rap group the Screwed Up Click.

== Life and career ==
Born John Edward Hawkins in Houston, Texas on November 15, 1969, he grew up with a younger brother, Patrick "Fat Pat" Hawkins and two sisters. He started rapping in 1992 when Fat Pat took him to DJ Screw's house, an upcoming mixtape producer and DJ in the southern area of Houston. In April 2006 Hawk married his longtime girlfriend, Meshah Henderson. The couple had two sons.

In 1994 Hawk, Fat Pat, DJ Screw, Lil' Keke and Koldjack collaborated to form the group D.E.A. and Dead End Records (named for the dead end block of Martin Luther King Blvd where Hawk grew up in Houston). In late 1998 D.E.A. released an original independent album entitled, Screwed For Life featuring Lil' Keke, Big Pokey and the rest of the S.U.C. After the deaths of Hawk's brother (Fat Pat) and DJ Screw and the incarceration of many others SUC members, Hawk's ultimate mission and goal became keeping the "Ghetto Dream" alive. In 1999 Hawk participated in a Southside Playaz compilation album titled You Got Us Fuxxed Up, with Mike D, Claydoe and other members of the S.U.C. Hawk released his solo album, Under Hawk's Wings on Dead End Records in 2000 and had recorded with Lil' Flip, Lil' Keke, Big Moe, Z-Ro and was featured on the Lil' Troy hit "Wanna Be A Baller".

Big Hawk appeared on numerous mixtapes from artists in the Houston underground rap scene. After Screw's death in 2000, he was the main person responsible for keeping the S.U.C. together, so much so that his nickname was the Five Star General of the Screwed Up Click. He collaborated with Lil' O on the smash hit, "Back Back" Next, he partnered with Game Face Records in 2002 and released his first album under his label Ghetto Dreams Entertainment, self-titled, "HAWK". With the hit song, "U Already Know", the album charted the Billboard's list of top R&B and Rap Albums at no. 45. It was at Game Face Records where Hawk met and clicked with a young up and coming group called the GritBoyz and an artist named Starchy Archy. Hawk and Ghetto Dreams Ent. teamed up with Presidential Records in 2003 to release "A Bad Azz Mix Tape Vol. II." A year later he and Lil' Keke teamed up to release "Wreckin 2K4" with Presidential Records as well. It was around this time when the original S.U.C. members, along with M.J. (of Southside Studios) started collaborating on a group/compilation album titled "The Takeover". Trae tha Truth made an album dedicated to BIG HAWK called Life Goes On.

Hawk was featured on the popular single "Swang" by Trae that included a tribute to Fat Pat in 2005. In 2006, Hawk, along with Clint Dempsey of the U.S. National Soccer team recorded a song for Nike's "Joga Bonito" World Cup soccer promotion called "Don't Tread". He was part of Pepsi's Yahoo! "Houston Mic Pass" with Lil' Flip, Chamillionaire, Trae, Chingo Bling, Bun B, Short Dawg, Magno and Mike D. Since his death, Hawk has been featured on several tracks including Lil O's "I Do" single, "Down In Texas" off of the 2008 A.B.N. album It Is What It Is, and Big Unk's "I'ma Beast" to name a few.

On November 11, 2011, two posthumous singles were released called "Somebody Who Loves You" and "Praise God."

== Death ==
On May 1, 2006, eight years after his younger brother Fat Pat was murdered, Hawkins was shot dead in Houston. He had arrived early at a house on Redfern Drive to play dominoes with a friend, and was alone at the time when an unknown assailant shot him multiple times. Hawkins was 36 years old. His murder remains unsolved.

Fellow Houston rapper Bun B, in an interview with the Houston Chronicle, said about Hawkins: "There were no chinks in this man's moral armor. Because he was a rapper, there will be people who will take his death the wrong way, but he was a peaceful guy and a family man who had no beefs with anybody".

== Discography ==
=== Studio albums ===
List of studio albums, with selected chart positions and information
Year	Title	Peak chart positions			
Year	Title	Top R&B/Hip-Hop Albums	Top Rap Albums	Independent Albums	Heatseekers Albums
1998	Dead End Alliance (with DJ Screw, Fat Pat & Kay-K): Label: Dead End Records	—	—	—	—
2000	Under H.A.W.K.'s Wings: Label: Dead End Records	68	—	30	33
2001	HAWK: Label: Ghetto Dreams Entertainment	45	—	43	—
2004	Wreckin' 2004 (with Lil' Keke): Label: Presidential Records	93	—	—	—
2007	Endangered Species: Label: Ghetto Dreams Entertainment	54	24	—	—
2008	Still Wreckin' (with Lil' Keke): Label: Presidential Records	—	—	—	—

=== Mixtapes ===
- 2004: A Bad Azz Mix Tape Vol. II.
- 2005: The Incredible Hawk Undaground Volume 1
- 2005: The Incredible Hawk Undaground Volume 2
- 2006: Since the Gray Tapes, Vol. 4
- 2007: Terrible Texas Dub K Six

=== Guest appearances ===
Year	Song	Performer(s)	Album
1999	"Boys N Da South"	E.S.G.	Shinin' N' Grindin'
1999	"Day 4 Day G's"	Day 4 Day G's, Big Moe	What"s Da Deal!
2000	"Country Rap Tune"	Towdown, Big Pokey	By Prescription Only
2000	"Nigga Who Dat"	Woss Ness, South Park Mexican	Bangin Screw
2000	"Took A Lil Time"	Mafio, Shunny Pooh, Ronnie Spencer	Shunny Pooh Presents: 3rd Coast's Finest Volume 1
2000	"Save Me"	Candyman, Den-Den, Black-N-Mild, Lil J	Makin' Deals Of A Lifetime
2001	"Already"	G.I.N. of the Presidential Playas. Big Pokey	Straight Out Da Bottle
2001	"Real Recognize Real"	Godfather	Before It's Too Late
2001	"PAT"	D-Drew, Big Baby	Down South Still Holdin
2001	"You Made It Happen"	H.A.W.K.	ScrewHeads: Forever And A Day
2001	"Down South We Mob"	R.W.O., Lil' Keke	Book Of Game: Chapter 1
2002	"Chicken Fried Steak"	Tow Down, Slim Thug, Bun B	Chicken Fried Steak
2002	"Watch Out"	E.S.G., Slim Thug	Boss Hogg Outlaws
2002	"Keep It 100"	Kottonmouth	Urban Legend
2003	"Sho Yo Thong"	Lyrical 187	Ready 4 What Eva
2004	"G-Strang"	Kottonmouth, Big G	Authentic
2018	"Sicko Mode"	Travis Scott, Drake, Swae Lee	Astroworld

== Awards and nominations ==
=== Grammy Awards ===
The Grammy Awards are annual awards presented by The Recording Academy to recognize outstanding achievement in the mainly English-language music industry.

Year	Nominee / work	Award	Result	Ref.
2019	"Sicko Mode"	Best Rap Performance	Nominated	
2019	"Sicko Mode"	Best Rap Song	Nominated	

== See also ==
- Houston hip-hop
- List of murdered hip hop musicians
- List of unsolved murders (2000–present)
