= Lil' O =

American rapper

- Born: Oreoluwa Mitchell Magnus-Lawson; November 22, 1977 (age 48); Lagos, Nigeria
- Origin: Houston, Texas
- Genre: Hip-hop
- Occupation: Rapper
- Years active: 1990's - present
- Label: Game Face Entertainment

Lil' O (born Oreoluwa Mitchell Magnus-Lawson; November 22, 1977 in Lagos, Nigeria) is a Nigerian-American rapper, raised in Southwest Houston, Texas. He is an original member of DJ Screw's Screwed Up Click. He was also known as O or Da Fat Rat Wit Da Cheeze. His name references his height, at 5 feet tall.

== Early life ==
His father was a doctor and Lil' O and his four brothers and one sister had a middle class upbringing. His mother died from ovarian cancer when Lil' O was 13 and suddenly his father's strict Nigerian upbringing began to chase him to rebellion.

Soon after his mother's death, Lil' O began hanging in the streets with friends who were in the drug game, and he became addicted to the fast money that drug dealing brought in. "I got street fame, women, and a lot of money quickly and easily", he says. Eventually he got collared. After his arrest, his father kicked him out of the house and Lil' O fell deeper into the lure of the drug game. While out on bond, he continued to sell drugs and was caught again. This time he attempted to swallow the evidence before the police could arrest him. He swallowed an ounce-and-a-half of crack cocaine, an act which caused his lungs to collapse. He was put on life support and his father was told to prepare for his death. "It's really a miracle that I woke up at all", says Lil' O. "I was breathing through tubes on my deathbed and I looked down and saw that my ankles were cuffed to the bed. I realized, if I recovered I was going to jail, and if I didn't I was going to die".

He went to Xavier University of Louisiana in New Orleans, where he studied business. Away from the drugs and the street life of Southwest Houston, Lil' O also began to dabble in one of his first loves – hip-hop. "Man, when I was growing up, LL Cool J came out with 'Radio' and that was it, I was hooked. I never thought about rapping as a career because I was making so much selling drugs, plus the money came faster than it does in the rap game", says O. While at Xavier, in 1997, he recorded "Can't Stop" – featuring vocal contributions from the ladies that would go on to earn renown as Destiny's Child. The track soon became Lil' O's debut single and went on to be an instant local hit. Regardless, Lil' O eventually found himself out of school and back in Texas, again exposed to the same lifestyle he'd tried to leave behind. In 1999, he then signed with the Houston-based indie label Game Face Entertainment, but also began selling drugs again. His debut album, Blood Money, sold 20,000 copies but he was unable to promote it due to spending time in jail.

After being released from prison, Lil' O left the drug game behind for good and focused on his music completely. He also enrolled at the University of Houston–Downtown and majored in business. "Some days I wouldn't feel like going to class, and then I would look across the street at the county jail and remember how I felt when I was in there. That would be all the motivation I would need to get myself to class", says Lil' O with a hearty laugh.

In 2001, his album Da Fat Rat wit da Cheeze sold over 75,000. He collaborated with Big Hawk on the hit single "Back Back", that led him back to a nationwide deal with Atlantic Records, which he left in 2003.

== Discography ==
=== Albums ===
- 1999: Blood Money
- 2000: Da Fat Rat wit da Cheeze
- 2003: Food On Tha Table
- 2007: Greatest Hits
- 2011: Grind Hard, Pray Harder
- 2021: The Greatest Of All Players

=== Mixtapes ===
- 2004: Neva Lay Down Vol. 1
- 2005: Jealous Got Me Strapped (Neva Lay Down Vol. 2)
- 2006: My Struggle My Hustle
- 2006: South Side Tippin
- 2008: Tha Flood (Neva Lay Down Vol. 3)
- 2010: Tha Flood 1.5
- 2016: The Re-Up

=== Singles ===
Year	Song	U.S. Hot 100	U.S. R&B	U.S. Rap	Album
"Can't Stop" (featuring Destiny's Child)	1997	—	87	22	Greatest Hits
"Back Back" (featuring Big Hawk)	2001	—	62	—	Da Fat Rat wit da Cheeze

== See also ==
- Houston hip-hop
- Screwed Up Click
