= Big Pokey =

American rapper (1974–2023)

Background information
- Born: Milton Jerome Powell Jr. November 29, 1974; Houston, Texas, U.S.
- Died: June 18, 2023 (aged 48) Beaumont, Texas, U.S.
- Genre: Southern hip-hop
- Occupation: Rapper
- Years active: 1995–2023
- Label: Presidential Records
- Formerly of: Screwed Up Click

Milton Jerome Powell Jr. (November 29, 1974 – June 18, 2023), better known by his stage name Big Pokey, was an American rapper. Big Pokey was associated with chopped and screwed music, and was one of the original members of the Screwed Up Click.

== Biography ==
Milton Powell was born on November 29, 1974, in Houston, Texas. He attended Yates High School, where he played football and became close friends with George Floyd.

Known via a variety of nicknames, including Big Poyo and Podina, Big Pokey burst onto the Houston rap scene in the early 1990s as a member of his friend DJ Screw's friend group-turned rap collective Screwed Up Click. Big Pokey was featured on DJ Screw's mixtape "June 27th Freestyle" which became a landmark album in chopped and screwed hip-hop.

In early 1999, he made his solo debut with his first full-length album, Hardest Pit in the Litter. The following year, Pokey returned with D-Game 2000, another album of mid-tempo 808-driven beats featuring several of his Houston peers as guests. In 2001, he collaborated with the Wreckshop Wolfpack for Tha Collabo and then returned in 2002 with another solo album, Da Sky's Da Limit. In 2004, a clip of Pokey's song "Who Dat Talkin Down" was featured in the pilot episode of HBO's Entourage. Pokey was featured on Paul Wall's 2005 hit single "Sittin' Sidewayz" which peaked at #93 on US Billboard Hot 100.

== Death ==
On June 17, 2023, Powell collapsed from a heart attack while performing at a bar called Pour 09 in Beaumont, Texas. He was taken to a hospital in the city and died overnight on June 18, at the age of 48. An autopsy found that he had atherosclerosis and hypertensive heart disease.

== Discography ==
=== Studio albums ===
List of studio albums, with selected chart positions and information
Year	Title	Peak chart positions		
Year	Title	Top R&B/Hip-Hop Albums	Independent Albums	Heatseekers Albums
1999	Hardest Pit in the Litter: Label: Chevis Entertainment	72	—	47
2000	D-Game 2000: Label: Chevis Entertainment	71	31	38
2001	Tha Collabo (with The Wreckshop Wolfpack): Label: Wreckshop Records	74	21	31
2002	Da Sky's da Limit: Label: Wreckshop Records	47	46	46
2008	Evacuation Notice: Label: Koch Records	75	—	—
2021	Sensei: Label: Mob Style Music Group, Win Or Regret, SoSouth	—	—	—

=== Mixtapes ===
- 2003: Mob 4 Life (with Chris Ward)
- 2004: A Bad Azz Mix Tape Vol. 3
- 2004: The Best Of Big Pokey II (8ighted & Chopped)
- 2005: Since The Grey Tapes Vol. 3 (with Lil' Keke)
- 2007: On Another Note
- 2008: Keep On Stackin, Vol. 3: Smoked Out... Beatin!!! (with Lil C)
- 2008: Screwed Up Gorillaz (with E.S.G.)
- 2010: Warning Shot

== See also ==
- Houston hip-hop
