= Lil' Keke =

American rapper from Texas

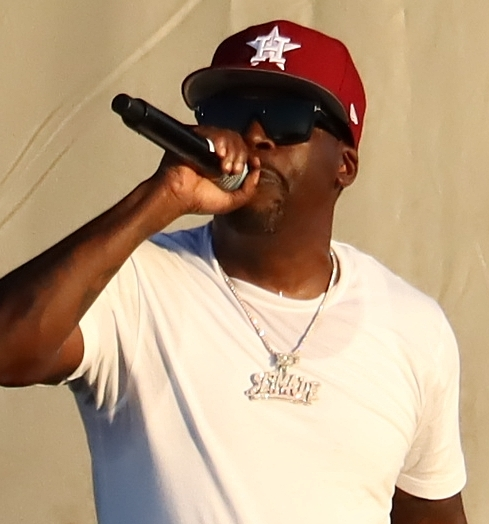
- Lil' Keke performing at Missouri City Juneteenth Celebration in 2024

Background information
- Born: Marcus Lakee Edwards; March 29, 1976 (age 50)
- Origin: Anahuac, Texas, U.S.
- Genres: Southern hip-hop; Chopped and Screwed; trap
- Occupations: Rapper; songwriter
- Years active: 1993–present
- Labels: Swishahouse; Warner; Commission Music; TF; Universal Motown; Screwed Up; SoSouth; Fontana

Marcus Lakee Edwards (born March 29, 1976), better known by his stage name Lil' Keke, is an American rapper and original member of the Southern hip hop collective Screwed Up Click.

== Biography ==
=== Music career ===
Lil' Keke gained national attention with his track "Southside" from his 1997 release Don't Mess Wit Texas. In 2005, Lil' Keke signed to Swishahouse Records. In an interview with HitQuarters at the time, label president and A&R T. Farris said, "He is a legend here in Houston. He plays a big role in the whole style of rap that we make down here." Lil' Keke started out working alongside DJ Screw doing mixtapes.

=== Community service ===
In 2016, the rapper received an award from President Barack Obama for his community service efforts in the Houston area.

== Discography ==
=== Studio albums ===
- 1997: Don't Mess wit Texas
- 1998: The Commission
- 1999: It Was All a Dream
- 2001: Peepin' in My Window
- 2001: Platinum in da Ghetto
- 2002: Birds Fly South
- 2003: Street Stories
- 2003: Changin' Lanes
- 2004: Currency
- 2005: Undaground All Stars: The Texas Line Up
- 2008: Loved by Few, Hated by Many
- 2012: Heart of a Hustla
- 2014: Money Don't Sleep
- 2016: Slfmade
- 2018: Slfmade 2
- 2020: Slfmade 3
- 2022: Lgnd
- 2023: 25 Summers
- 2024: Can't Rain Forever
- 2025: Legend Hotel
- 2026: Streets Is My Witness

=== Other albums ===
- 2001: From Coast to Coast
- 2010: Still Standing
- 2011: Ridin' with da Top Off Vol.1: Best of Both Worlds
- 2011: Testimony
- 2012: The Round Table
- 2013: Top Features Vol.1
- 2014: The Round Table Vol.2: Still Hungry
- 2015: Top Features Vol.2

=== Collaboration albums ===
- 2003: The Big Unit (with Slim Thug)
- 2004: Wreckin' 2004 (with Big Hawk)
- 2004: Bad Company (with Shorty Mac)
- 2005: Str8 Out da Slums (with The Jacka)
- 2005: Since the Gray Tapes Vol.3 (with Big Pokey)
- 2006: If You Ain't Hungry, Don't Come to the Table (with CMG)
- 2008: Still Wreckin' (with H.A.W.K.)
- 2011: Standing Ovation (with Don Chief)
- 2013: Trunk Waving and Misbehavin' (with DJ Gold of the SUC)
- 2014: From the Southside to WTX (with Rawsome Russ)
- 2020: Slab Talk(with Paul Wall)
- 2021: Don/Dawkins (with Bo Dawkins)
- 2025: Double Cup, Pt. 2 (with Slim Thug)
- 2026: Streets Is My Witness, Pt. 2 (with Cal Wayne and AL-D*300)
