= Lil' Flip discography =

- Studio albums: 6
- Extended plays: 1
- Soundtrack albums: 1
- Compilation albums: 26
- Singles: 14
- Independent albums: 3
- Mixtapes: 34
- Featured singles: 6
- Collaboration albums: 14

This is the discography of Lil' Flip, an American rapper.

== Albums ==
=== Studio albums ===
List of studio albums, with selected chart positions
Title	Album details	Peak chart positions			Certifications
Title	Album details	US	US R&B	US Rap	Certifications
Undaground Legend	Released: August 27, 2002; Label: Sucka Free, Loud, Columbia; Format: CD, digital download, LP	12	4	—	RIAA: Platinum
U Gotta Feel Me	Released: March 30, 2004; Label: Sucka Free, Clover G, Columbia, Sony Urban; Format: CD, digital download, LP	4	2	2	RIAA: Platinum
I Need Mine	Released: March 27, 2007; Label: Clover G, Asylum, Warner Bros.; Format: CD, digital download, LP	15	5	4	

=== Independent albums ===
List of independent albums, with selected chart positions. Independent albums are released independently through that artist or that artist self founded label.
Title	Album details	Peak chart positions		
Title	Album details	US	US R&B	US Rap
The Leprechaun	Released: July 18, 2000; Label: Sucka Free; Format: CD, digital download, LP	—	67	—
Respect Me	Released: September 29, 2009; Label: Clover G, Hi-Power, E1 Music; Format: CD, digital download, LP	—	—	—
Underground Legend 2	Released: December 24, 2009; Label: Clover G; Format: CD, digital download, LP	—	—	—
Ahead of My Time	Released: July 6, 2010; Label: Clover G; Format: CD, digital download, LP	—	—	—
The Black Dr. Kevorkian	Released: October 31, 2013; Label: Clover G; Format: CD, digital download, LP	—	—	—
El Jefe	Released: March 17, 2015; Label: Clover G, SoSouth; Format: CD, digital download, LP	—	—	—
The Art of Freestyle	Released: October 31, 2016; Label: Clover G; Format: CD, digital download, LP	—	—	—
King	Released: March 24, 2018; Label: King Life Family / Clover G; Format: CD, digital download	—	—	—
Life	Released: March 26, 2018; Label: King Life Family / Clover G; Format: CD, digital download	—	—	—
The Art of Freestyle 2	Released: October 31, 2019; Label: Clover G / SoSouth; Format: CD, digital download	—	—	—
The Music Machine	Released: November 29, 2019; Label: GT Digital / Clover G; Format: CD, digital download	—	—	—
Feelings	Released: February 14, 2020; Label: GT Digital / Clover G; Format: CD, digital download	—	—	—
No Feelings	Released: February 14, 2020; Label: GT Digital; Format: CD, digital download	—	—	—
The Leprechaun 2	Released: March 17, 2020; Label: GT Digital / Clover G; Format: CD, digital download	—	—	—
The Art of Freestyle 3	Released: August 26, 2022; Label: Wreckshop Records / Clover G / Music Access, Inc.; Format: CD, digital download	—	—	—
Fondren Flip	Released: November 11, 2022; Label: Clover G / Music Access, Inc.; Format: CD, digital download	—	—	—
Worthing Wesley	Released: November 16, 2023; Label: GT Digital / 1 Deep Ent / Clover G; Format: CD, digital download	—	—	—
Fear of Going Broke	Released: December 12, 2025; Label: Clover G / GT Digital; Format: CD, digital download	—	—	—
La Clover Nostra III: I Trust Me	Released: March 17, 2026; Label: Clover G / GT Digital; Format: CD, digital download	—	—	—
War Peace Family Faith	Released: July 4, 2026; Label: Clover G / GT Digital; Format: CD, digital download	—	—	—

=== EPs ===
List of extended plays, with selected chart positions
Title	EP details	Peak chart positions		
Title	EP details	US	US R&B	US Rap
Fliperaci	Released: September 26, 2006; Label: Clover G, Asylum, Warner Bros.; Format: digital download	—	—	—
K	Released: October 27, 2017; Label: King Life Family LLC; Format: digital download	—	—	—
I	Released: January 26, 2018; Label: King Life Family / Clover G; Format: digital download	—	—	—
N	Released: January 26, 2018; Label: King Life Family / Clover G; Format: digital download	—	—	—
G	Released: February 16, 2018; Label: King Life Family / Clover G; Format: digital download	—	—	—
333	Released: March 3, 2023; Label: GT Digital / Clover G; Format: digital download	—	—	—
Cadillac (with Big Creature)	Released: June 19, 2026; Label: Big Creature; Format: digital download	—	—	—

=== Soundtrack albums ===
List of soundtrack albums, with selected chart positions
Title	Album details	Peak chart positions		
Title	Album details	US	US R&B	US Rap
Don't Let the Music Industry Fool You	Released: April 20, 2014; Label: Clover G; Format: CD, digital download	—	—	—

=== Collaboration albums ===
List of collaboration albums, with selected chart positions.
Title	Album details	Peak chart positions			
Title	Album details	US	US R&B	US Rap	US Ind
Hustlaz Stackin' Endz (with H.$.E.)	Released: November 30, 1999; Label: Sucka Free; Format: CD, digital download, LP	—	—	—	—
Kings of the South (with Z-Ro)	Released: March 29, 2005; Label: Payday; Format: CD, digital download, LP	—	57	—	48
Connected (with Mr. Capone-E)	Released: November 14, 2006; Label: Thump; Format: CD, digital download, LP	—	39	18	—
Still Connected (with Mr. Capone-E)	Released: November 6, 2007; Label: Hi-Power; Format: CD, digital download, LP	—	68	—	—
All Eyez on Us (with Young Noble)	Released: March 4, 2008; Label: Real Talk; Format: CD, digital download, LP	137	31	10	20
Still Connected Part 3 (with Mr. Capone-E)	Released: October 28, 2008; Label: Hi-Power; Format: CD, digital download, LP	—	—	—	—
Certified (with Gudda Gudda)	Released: May 26, 2009; Label: Real Talk; Format: CD, digital download, LP	—	—	—	—
Let the Good Times Roll (with Da Stoner$)	Released: April 20, 2011; Label: Clover G, Flyboy; Format: CD, digital download, LP	—	—	—	—
The DUBEDMHOP Album (with DJ Michael 5000 Watts)	Released: May 20, 2015; Label: Clover G, Swishahouse; Format: CD, digital download, LP	—	—	—	—
La Clover Nostra: Clover Gang (with Clover Gang)	Released: March 17, 2019; Label: GT Digital / Lil' Flip; Format: CD, digital download	—	—	—	—
The ConeHeads (with The ConeHeads)	Released: April 20, 2019; Label: GT Digital / PI Town Sound / Clover G; Format: CD, digital download	—	—	—	—
H Town to Pi Town (with E.J. Carter)	Released: May 3, 2019; Label: GT Digital / PI Town Sound / Clover G; Format: CD, digital download	—	—	—	—
Major League Playaz (with Ernez)	Released: July 2, 2019; Label: King Life Family / Ernez Music; Format: CD, digital download	—	—	—	—
Making History (with K-Bird)	Released: December 22, 2019; Label: Kill Gang USA / Urbanlegends; Format: CD, digital download	—	—	—	—
Made in Texas (with Tum Tum)	Released: May 1, 2020; Label: Music Access, Inc.; Format: CD, digital download	—	—	—	—
40oz & Lean (with D-Rich the Crown Kid)	Released: June 11, 2021; Label: Music Access, Inc.; Format: CD, digital download	—	—	—	—
La Clover Nostra II: The Mob Lives On (with Clover Gang)	Released: March 17, 2022; Label: Music Access, Inc.; Format: CD, digital download	—	—	—	—
Made in Texas 2 (with Tum Tum)	Released: April 20, 2022; Label: Music Access, Inc.; Format: CD, digital download	—	—	—	—
Make It Make Sense (with CashStar)	Released: November 19, 2022; Label: G Rec / 3 Faces Ent. / GT Digital; Format: CD, digital download	—	—	—	—
The Leprechauns (with Rizzoo Rizzoo)	Released: March 17, 2024; Label: Clover G, TSF; Format: CD, digital download	—	—	—	—
Kingz of the South, Vol. 2 (with Z-Ro)	Released: March 29, 2025; Label: 1 Deep Ent., Clover G; Format: CD, digital download	—	—	—	—
Medicinal Music (with Dr. Za)	Released: April 20, 2026; Label: Clover G, GT Digital; Format: CD, digital download	—	—	—	—

=== Compilation albums ===
List of compilation albums, with selected chart positions..
Title	Album details	Peak chart positions		
Title	Album details	US	US R&B	US Rap
Pimpin' Ain't Dead, Vol.#15	Released: 2000; Label: Sucka Free; Format: CD, digital download, LP	—	—	—
No Time Outs (with Big Shasta)	Released: 2000; Label: Sucka Free; Format: CD, digital download, LP	—	—	—
3 Headed Monster (with Lil Ron & Big-T)	Released: 2001; Re-released: April 1, 2008; Label: Sucka Free, StarzMusic, BCD; Format: CD, digital download, LP	—	—	—
My Last Underground	Released: 2001; Label: Sucka Free; Format: CD, digital download, LP	—	—	—
Undaground Vol.#1,Dat Boy Goes Off	Released: 2001; Label: Sucka Free; Format: CD, digital download, LP	—	—	—
Best of Lil Flip, Vol. 1	Released: 2003; Label: Sucka Free; Format: CD, digital download, LP	—	—	—
Freestyle Kings Volume II	Released: August 5, 2003; Label: Big Kanaka; Format: CD, digital download, LP	—	—	—
Freestyle Kings Vol. 3	Released: February 3, 2004; Label: Big Kanaka; Format: CD, digital download, LP	—	—	—
The Best of Lil' Flip & Play-n-Skillz (with Play-N-Skillz)	Released: March 29, 2004; Label: RnD; Format: CD, digital download, LP	—	—	—
The Takeover	Released: August 17, 2004; Label: TJ, BCD; Format: CD, digital download, LP	—	—	—
A New Beginning Volume 2	Released: November 16, 2004; Label: TJ Music, StarzMusic; Format: CD, digital download, LP	—	—	—
Freestyle Kings, Vol. 3.5 (with The Ghetto Brothers)	Released: January 11, 2005; Label: StarzMusic, Ghetto Brothers; Format: CD, digital download, LP	—	—	—
Freestyle Kings, Vol. 4: Dirty South	Released: January 11, 2005; Label: TJ Music, StarzMusic; Format: CD, digital download, LP	—	—	—
Da Bottom, Vol. 6	Released: October 18, 2005; Label: South Mouth, BCD; Format: CD, digital download, LP	—	—	—
Still Tippin In Texas (with Mike Jones)	Released: November 15, 2005; Label: TJ Music, BCD; Format: CD, digital download, LP	—	—	—
Envy Me (with DJ Double R)	Released: November 5, 2005; Label: Clover G, Redemption, 101 Distribution; Format: CD, digital download, LP	—	—	—
Texas Mafia (with Judge Dredd & Lil KeKe)	Released: November 15, 2005; Label: Ghetto Brothers; Format: CD, digital download, LP	—	—	—
Blowin & Bangin	Released: November 15, 2005; Label: TJ Music, StarzMusic; Format: CD, digital download, LP	—	—	—
Blowin & Bangin, Vol. 2	Released: January 17, 2006; Label: TJ Music, StarzMusic; Format: CD, digital download, LP	—	—	—
A New Beginning Vol. 3	Released: February 28, 2006; Label: TJ Music, StarzMusic; Format: CD, digital download, LP	—	—	—
Court Sessions, Vol. 1 (with Judge Dredd)	Released: February 28, 2006; Label: StarzMusic, Ghetto Brothers; Format: CD, digital download, LP	—	—	—
Court Sessions, Vol. 2 (with Judge Dredd)	Released: February 28, 2006; Label: StarzMusic, Ghetto Brothers; Format: CD, digital download, LP	—	—	—
Envy Me Pt. 2 (with DJ Double R)	Released: February 28, 2006; Label: Fyngermade; Format: CD, digital download, LP	—	—	—
Young Bosses Getting Cash (with Crime Boss)	Released: December 19, 2006; Label: Clover G, BCD; Format: CD, digital download, LP	—	—	—
Around Da World In 1 Day	Released: April 10, 2007; Label: Clover G, Deep; Format: CD, digital download, LP	—	—	—
How the King Was Crowned Vol. 1	Released: August 4, 2009; Label: Deep; Format: CD, digital download, LP	—	—	—
G-2010 Fans Special	Released: March 30, 2010; Label: Clover G, Deep; Format: CD, digital download, LP	—	—	—

=== Mixtapes ===
List of mixtapes, with year released
Title	Mixtape details
I'm a Balla	Released: November 7, 2006; Label: Clover G; Retail Mixtape
Houston Is Mine	Released: December 14, 2005; Label: Clover G; Hosted by DJ Big Mike
Houston Is Mine Pt. 2	Released: January 6, 2006; Label: Clover G; Hosted by DJ Big Mike
Crown Me	Released: February 18, 2007; Label: Clover G; Hosted by DJ Smallz
We Got Next (with Clover G's)	Released: November 27, 2007; Label: Clover G; Retail Mixtape
I Don't Write Shit	Released: February 28, 2009; Label: Clover G; Hosted by Cartune Network
Return of da #1 Fly Boy	Released: July 14, 2009; Label: Clover G; Retail Mixtape
King Muzick	Released: October 29, 2009; Label: Clover G; Hosted by DJ Rapid Ric
Go Hard	Released: January 6, 2010; Label: Clover G; Hosted by DJ Method
Lyrical Mayhem Vol. 1	Released: January 22, 2010; Label: Clover G; Hosted by DJ Far
Ladiez Nite Vol. 1	Released: February 7, 2010, 2010; Label: Clover G; Hosted by DJ Far
King of Texas	Released: February 12, 2010; Label: Clover G; Hosted by DJ Far
Crown Me 2	Released: March 3, 2010; Label: Clover G; Hosted by DJ Far
Reasonable Clout	Released: March 11, 2010; Label: Clover G; Hosted by DJ Far
My B-day (March 3rd 2010) Da Mixtape (29th Birthday Mixtape)	Released: March 16, 2010; Label: Clover G; Hosted by DJ Far
The Art of the Freestyle Pt. 3	Released: March 31, 2010; Label: Clover G; Hosted by DJ Far
Flip the Scrypt	Released: September 10, 2010; Label: Clover G; Hosted by DJ Big Redd
Invincible	Released: September 19, 2010; Label: Clover G; Hosted by DJ Far
The Punisher	Released: September 30, 2010; Label: Clover G; Hosted by DJ Far
Dangerous	Released: October 23, 2010; Label: Clover G; Hosted by DJ Far
My B-Day Mixtape (My 30th Birthday Mixtape)	Released: May 20, 2011; Label: Clover G; Hosted by DJ Far
Kiss the Pinky Ring	Released: Jun 19, 2011; Label: Clover G; Hosted by DJ Far
#Theturtlewontherace	Released: September 6, 2012; Label: Clover G; Hosted by DJ Far & DJ Nasty
My B-day 32 (The Mixtape)	Released: March 7, 2013; Label: Clover G; Hosted by Clover G
#Timeless	Released: July 12, 2013; Label: Clover G; Hosted by Clover G
#Timeless II (#tim3l3ssii)	Released: August 19, 2013; Label: Clover G; Hosted by Clover G
40oz & Lean (with D-Rich)	Released: December 24, 2013; Label: Clover G; Hosted by Clover G
White Cup Gang (with Stubba Lean & Street Action)	Released: February 3, 2014; Label: Clover G; Hosted by Clover G
My Bday 33	Released: March 13, 2014; Label: Clover G; Hosted by Clover G
Welcome 2 the Clover (with Absent)	Released: April 11, 2014; Label: Clover G; Hosted by Mr. Peter Parker
Timeless 3	Released: May 3, 2014; Label: Clover G; Hosted by DJ Sam Hoody
#ScrewLuv	Released: July 21, 2014; Label: Clover G; Hosted by DJ Red
Timeless IV	Released: July 21, 2014; Label: Clover G; Hosted by DJ Sam Hoody
Timeless V	Released: September 26, 2014; Label: Clover G; Hosted by DJ Sam Hoody
#BlackFriday (with Clover G Records)	Released: December 3, 2014; Label: Clover G; Hosted by DJ Sam Hoody
Going Out with a Bang	Released: January 13, 2015; Label: Clover G; Hosted by Token White Guy
My BDay 34	Released: March 3, 2015; Label: Clover G; Hosted by Clover G
#JusCuzIWasBored	Released: September 4, 2015; Label: Clover G; Hosted by Clover G
Texas Tea Party (with Big J)	Released: September 12, 2015; Label: Clover G; Hosted by DJ Big Redd
#NOFUX2GIVE	Released: October 21, 2015; Label: Clover G; Hosted by Clover G
#Tim3l3ss VI (A Pimp C Tribute)	Released: November 6, 2015; Label: Clover G; Hosted by DJ Sam Hoody
My B Day 35	Released: March 3, 2016; Label: Clover G; Hosted by DJ Sam Hoody
Timeless VII (Devin the Dude Tribute)	Released: March 4, 2016; Label: Clover G; Hosted by DJ Sam Hoody
Timeless VIII (8Ball & MJG Tribute)	Released: March 5, 2016; Label: Clover G; Hosted by DJ Sam Hoody
Timeless IX (Wu-Tang Tribute)	Released: March 6, 2016; Label: Clover G; Hosted by DJ Sam Hoody
Timeless X (Outkast Tribute)	Released: March 7, 2016; Label: Clover G; Hosted by DJ Sam Hoody
Timeless XI (Dipset Tribute)	Released: March 8, 2016; Label: Clover G; Hosted by DJ Sam Hoody
Thuggin' in Public	Released: March 10, 2016; Label: Clover G; Hosted by None
Flip Mayweather	Released: December 24, 2020; Label: Clover G; Hosted by None
Cruise Control	Released: February 3, 2022; Label: Clover G; Hosted by None

== Singles ==
=== As lead artist ===
List of singles, with selected chart positions and certifications, showing year released and album name
Title	Year	Peak chart positions						Certifications	Album
Title	Year	US	US R&B	US Rap	FRA	NZ	UK	Certifications	Album
"I Can Do Dat"	2000	—	—	—	—	—	—		The Leprechaun
"The Way We Ball"	2002	—	69	—	—	—	—		Undaground Legend
"Game Over (Flip)"	2004	15	8	4	—	40	—	RIAA: Platinum	U Gotta Feel Me
"Sunshine" (featuring Lea)	2004	2	2	2	36	10	16	RIAA: Gold	U Gotta Feel Me
"What It Do" (featuring Mannie Fresh)	2006	—	71	—	—	—	—		I Need Mine
"Ghetto Mindstate (Can't Get Away)" (featuring Lyfe Jennings)	2007	—	77	—	—	—	—		I Need Mine
"Heartbreaker" (featuring Eeden & Sean Thomas)	2009	—	—	—	—	—	—		Ahead of My Time
"Kim Kardashian"	2009	—	—	—	—	—	—		—N/a
"Syrup In My Cup" (featuring Magno & Lucky Luciano)	2010	—	—	—	—	—	—		—N/a
"How We Roll" (with 918)	2011	—	—	—	—	—	—		—N/a
"Talking S**t" (featuring Willie P & Smoov Da Crim)	2011	—	—	—	—	—	—		—N/a
"Lucky Charm"	2011	—	—	—	—	—	—		—N/a
"Catch Me" (with Rob Street)	2014	—	—	—	—	—	—		—N/a
"Game Over II"	2014	—	—	—	—	—	—		El Jefe
"In My Pimp C Voice"	2014	—	—	—	—	—	—		El Jefe
"Bestfriend" (featuring E.J. & Rev City)	2015	—	—	—	—	—	—		El Jefe
"—" denotes a recording that did not chart or was not released in that territory.

=== As featured performer ===
List of singles, with selected chart positions and certifications, showing year released and album name
Title	Year	Peak chart positions						Certifications	Album
Title	Year	US	US R&B	US Rap	GER	NZ	UK	Certifications	Album
"Like a Pimp" (David Banner featuring Lil' Flip)	2003	48	15	10	—	—	—		Mississippi: The Album
"Tear It Up" (Yung Wun featuring DMX, Lil' Flip and David Banner)	2003	76	39	21	—	—	—		The Dirtiest Thirstiest
"Ridin' Spinners" (Three 6 Mafia featuring Lil' Flip)	2003	—	62	—	—	—	—		Da Unbreakables
"How I Feel" (Lexx featuring Lil' Flip)	2003	—	90	—	—	—	—		Connected
"Never Really Was" (Mario Winans featuring Lil' Flip)	2004	—	90	—	52	—	44		Hurt No More
"Turn It Up" (Chamillionaire featuring Lil' Flip)	2005	41	31	9	—	23	—	RIAA: Gold	The Sound of Revenge
"—" denotes a recording that did not chart or was not released in that territory.

=== Promotional singles ===
List of singles, with selected chart positions, showing year released and album name
Title	Year	Peak chart positions		Album
Title	Year	US	US R&B	Album
"Draped Up" (Remix) (Bun B featuring Lil' Keke, Slim Thug, Chamillionaire, Paul Wall, Mike Jones, Aztek, Lil' Flip and Z-Ro)	2007	—	45	Trill

== Guest appearances ==
List of non-single guest appearances, with other performing artists, showing year released and album name
Title	Year	Other artist(s)	Album
"Realist Rhymin'"	1999	E.S.G.	Shinin' n' Grindin'
"Grippin' Grain'"	1999	Yungstar, Slikk Breeze, C-Note, Kool-Aid, Lil' Flex, Lil' Pat	Throwed Yung Playa
"Thug Niggaz"	1999	Lil' O, Big Pokey	Blood Money
"Rollin'"	1999	201, SPM	Living Lavish Down South
"Somebody Say 'Oh Yea'"	2000	H.A.W.K., Chris Ward, Mike D, Big Pokey	Under Hawk's Wings
"My Piece Shine Brite"	2000	C-Note, D-Red, Will-Lean	Forever Botany
"Flossin'"	2000	C-Note, Papa Reu, Marilyn B., X-Girlfriend, Chris Ward, Big Pokey	Third Coast Born 2000
"Thug Life"	2000	None	H-Town M.O.B. soundtrack
"Ruttey Poo"	2000	Staydown	N-da-Game
"In House Tonight"	2001	Big T	Million Dollar Hooks
"Candy on Chrome"	2001	Big T	Million Dollar Hooks
"Playa Made"	2001	Big T, Lil' Mario	The Boss of All Bosses
"Can't Live wit'm"	2001	Godfather, D-Red	Before It's Too Late
"Get Ready"	2001	Godfather, C-Note, Will-Lean, D-Red	Before It's Too Late
"Ni@@aZ Like Ya'll"	2001	Most Wanted Boyz	Down Bad
"It's About to Go Down"	2002	Big Moe, Toon, Mr. 3-2, D-Gotti, Noke D	Purple World
"We Represent"	2002	8Ball, T.I.	None
"Rollin' on Dubs"	2002	Tow Down, Papa Reu	Chicken Fried Steak
"Fuck the Game"	2002	Young Buck	Born to Be a Thug
"Street Niggaz"	2002	Hobo Tone, Red, B. Rich	Hobolavirus
"Can't Nobody (Remix)"	2003	Kelly Rowland	Can't Nobody single
"Bout Our Money"	2003	David Banner	Undaground, Vol. 1
"Rollin' on 20's"	2003	Yung Redd	2 Fast 2 Furious soundtrack
"Rainbow Colors"	2003	DJ Paul, Juicy J	Da Unbreakables
"Top Down"	2003	The Last Mr. Bigg	The Mask Is Off
"Talk to Me"	2003	David Banner	MTA2: Baptized in Dirty Water
"Stunt 187"	2004	The Game, Young Zee	Invasion, Part 3: Countdown to Armageddon
"Platinum Stars"	2004	Chamillionaire, Bun B	The Mixtape Messiah
"Naughty Girl (Remix)"	2004	Beyoncé	Naughty Girl single
"Don't Stop the Music"	2004	DJ Kay Slay, Lil' Mo, E-40	The Streetsweeper, Vol. 2: the Pain from the Game
"Real Niggas"	2004	Young Buck, Big Shasta	Welcome to the Hood
I Got 5 on It	2004	Young Buck, Big Shasta	Welcome to the Hood
"What It Be Like"	2004	Grafh, Sosh Bacardi	The Oracle Mixtape
"Let's Go"	2004	Al Kapone, E-40	It Aint Over
"Me Money"	2004	Jeezy	Tha Streets Iz Watchin'
"Ballers"	2004	Roy Jones Jr., Perion	Body Head Bangerz, Vol. 1
"Boy"	2004	Nelly, Big Gipp	Sweat
"State Your Name, Gangsta"	2004	The Game, Cassidy	Westside Story: the Compton Chronicles
"Still Ballin'"	2005	Messy Marv, Big Shasta	Bandannas, Tattoos & Tongue Rings
"Lil' Flip Speaks"	2005	None	Da Bottom, Vol. 3
"You Know I Got Them Thang's"	2005	None	Da Bottom, Vol. 3
"Comin' Up"	2005	Pimp C, Z-Ro	The Sweet James Jones Stories
"Call Me (Remix)"	2005	Play-n-Skillz, Chamillionaire, Young Chris	The Album Before the Album
"Don't Cha Get Mad"	2005	DJ Paul, Crunchy Black, Juicy J, The Last Mr. Bigg	Most Known Unknown
"Frontin' n' Fakin'"	2005	Lucky-Ray, Carleeto, J-Murder, Real	Bang!!!
"What's Goin' On"	2005	Lucky-Ray, Big Shasta	Bang!!!
"Where My Ladies At"	2005	Lucky-Ray	Bang!!!
"What Would You Do"	2005	Lucky-Ray	Bang!!!
"Don't Put Your Hands on Me"	2005	DJ Clue, Lil' Jon & The Eastside Boyz, Lil' Scrappy, Juvenile	Envy Me
"Dammit Man (Remix)"	2005	Pitbull	Money Is Still a Major Issue
"Don't Hate Me"	2006	Partners-n-Crime, Skip	Club Bangaz
"Drop Top Chevy"	2006	Mr. Capone-E, Mr. Criminal	Don't Get It Twisted
"Screwed to da Game"	2007	Prophet Posse	The Return: Part 1
"Lovely Day"	2007	Z-Ro, Big Shasta	Power
"I Take Respect"	2007	Mr. Criminal, Mr. Silent	Ryder Muzic
"Trunk Bangin'"	2007	Shei Atkins	Girl Talk
"Interlude"	2007	—N/a	74 Minutes of Drama
"Shot Caller (Remix)"	2007	Big Bake	74 Minutes of Drama
"Flavor of the Week"	2007	Yella Fella, Tum Tum	—N/a
"Holdin'"	2008	Big Moe, Big Pokey, Tyte Eyez	Unfinished Business
"Let's Talk About Big Money"	2008	Mr. Criminal, Mr. Silent	Rise 2 Power
"Southside"	2009	Z-Ro	Cocaine
"Thank You"	2009	Z-Ro	Cocaine
"She Ain't Got It All"	2009	Dorrough	Dorrough Music
"Anythang"	2010	Chingy	Success & Failure
"Rags 2 Riches"	2010	The Bilz and Kashif	Breaking Barriers
"Fakerz"	2011	Cashis, Mitchy Slick	The Vault
"U Can Do It"	2013	J-Hood, Project Pat, Ron Browz, Torch	—N/a
"Mashin'"	2014	Pastor Troy	Welcome to the Rap Game
"Like a Pimp 2015"	2014	Gangsta Boo & Beat King	Underground Cassette Tape Music
"Trying to Survive"	2017	Yukmouth, C-Bo	JJ Based on a Vill Story: One
"One Time"	2017	Slim Thug, Mike D, Lil' O, Big Pokey, E.S.G.	Welcome 2 Houston
"Houston to the Bay"	2024	Spice 1, Lashae Love, Paul Wall	Platinum O.G. 2
