= Nicholas Loftin =

American hip hop record producer

Nick "Fury" Loftin
- Also known as: Nick “Fury”
- Born: Nicholaus Gerard Loftin; Newark, New Jersey, U.S. Atlanta, Georgia, U.S.
- Genres: Hip hop, R&B, funk
- Occupation: Record producer
- Years active: 1998-present
- Label: New Jeru Entertainment
- Website: discogs.com/artist/173801-Nick-Fury-Loftin

Nicholaus Gerard Loftin, also known professionally as Nick “Fury” (or simply “Fury”), is an American hip hop record producer. He is known for producing Houston-based rapper Lil' Flip's 2004 hit single "Game Over (Flip)", which peaked at number 15 in the US Billboard Hot 100 and received platinum certification by the Recording Industry Association of America (RIAA).

In January 1996, Loftin relocated to Atlanta, Georgia to produce soul, hip hop and R&B music. He has produced singles and albums for high-profile music industry acts, including Lil' Kim, Wu-Tang Clan, T.I., E-40, Nick Cannon and Trina, and remixed "One Love" and "It Ain't Hard to Tell" for the tenth anniversary edition of Nas' Illmatic album. He has contributed to soundtracks to 2001 films The Fast and the Furious and Osmosis Jones, and 2005 film The Longest Yard.

In 2014, Loftin, together with Fadale Northan and Frisco Rivera, produced the theme music and instrumentals for the former world champion boxer Willy Wise workout DVD, W3P: Willy Wise Workout - 3 Degrees of Power.

== Discography ==
- "Mr. Untouchable" and "Come At Me" by King Sun from Say No More (1999)
- "This Is It" by Supreme C (2000) - prod. w/ Sedeck
- "Custom Made (Give It to You)" by Lil' Kim from The Notorious K.I.M. (2000) - co-prod. by Daniel Glogower
- "Hustlin'" by Fat Joe from The Fast and the Furious: Original Motion Picture Soundtrack (2001)
- "Rider Like Me" by Ezekiel Lewis from Music From the Motion Picture Osmosis Jones (2001) - prod. w/ Ezekiel Lewis, Mary Brown & Verse 1
- "One of These Days" by Wu-Tang Clan from Iron Flag (2001)
- "I Still Luv You" by T.I. from Trap Muzik (2003)
- "That's A Good Look 4 U" by E-40 from Breakin' News (2003)
- "My Mic" by Nick Cannon and Biz Markie from Nick Cannon (2003)
- "Game Over (Flip)" by Lil' Flip from U Gotta Feel Me (2004)
- "Tha King" by T.I. from Urban Legend (2004)
- "One Love (Remix)" and "It Ain't Hard to Tell (Remix)" by Nas from 10 Year Anniversary Illmatic Platinum Series (2004)
- "Bounce Like This" by T.I. from Music From and Inspired By the Motion Picture The Longest Yard (2005)
- "Sunshine to the Rain" by Miri Ben-Ari, Scarface and Anthony Hamilton from The Hip-Hop Violinist (2005) - prod. w/ Miri Ben-Ari
- "Reach Out" by Trina from Glamorest Life (2005) - co-prod. by Mike Caren
- "I'm Straight" by T.I., B.G. and Young Jeezy from King. (2006)
- "Murda" by P.C., Polite, Stumik and Hands from Raekwon Presents Icewater: Polluted Water (2007)
- "Entertainers" by Young Zee from The Album I Had When I Was Supposed To Sign To Shady! (2009)
- "In My Zone" by Stevie Stone from 2 Birds 1 Stone (2013) - prod. w/ Foss Weirdo
- "California Dreamin'" by Ice Cube from Man Up (2025) - prod. w/ Willie Roy McDougie
