= King of the South =

King of the South may refer to:

- King of the South, a figure mentioned in the Biblical Book of Daniel, Chapter 11
- Kings of the South, a 2005 a collaborative mixtape by American rappers Lil' Flip and Z-Ro
- T.I., an American rap artist
- Yung6ix, a Nigerian rapper

== See also ==
- List of honorific titles in popular music
