= All Eyez on Us =

Studio album by Lil' Flip and Young Noble
- Released: March 4, 2008
- Recorded: 2007
- Genre: Hip hop
- Length: 48:42
- Label: Real Talk Entertainment
- Producer: Derrick "Sac" Johnson (exec.); Beat Killaz; Real Talk Ent.; Vince V.

Lil' Flip chronology
| Still Connected (2008) | All Eyez on Us (2008) | Certified (2009) |

Young Noble chronology
| Thug in Thug Out (2007) | All Eyez on Us (2008) | Outlaw Rydahz Vol. 1 (2012) |

Professional ratings
Review scores
| Source | Rating |
|---|---|
| AllMusic | 3.5/5 stars |
| RapReviews | 6.5/10 |

All Eyez on Us is a collaborative studio album by American rappers Lil' Flip and Young Noble. It was released on March 4, 2008, via Real Talk Entertainment. Production was handled by Beat Killaz (Big Hollis and Preach), Vince V. and Real Talk Ent. with Derrick "Sac" Johnson served as executive producer. It features the lone guest appearance from Gudda Gudda. The album debuted at number 137 on the U.S. Billboard 200 chart, selling about 5,400 units during its first week. The title is a homage to 2Pac's 1996 album All Eyez on Me.

== Track listing ==
| No. | Title | Producer(s) | Length |
|---|---|---|---|
| 1. | "Flip Gates" | Big Hollis; Preach | 0:56 |
| 2. | "Where You From?" (featuring Gudda Gudda) | Big Hollis; Preach | 4:32 |
| 3. | "Can't Let It Happen" | Big Hollis; Preach | 5:11 |
| 4. | "Over Time" | Vince V. | 4:12 |
| 5. | "Be About Somethin'" | Big Hollis; Preach | 4:34 |
| 6. | "Pure Uncut" | Real Talk Ent. | 0:40 |
| 7. | "I'm a G" | Big Hollis; Preach | 4:13 |
| 8. | "Last Dayz" | Big Hollis; Preach | 5:16 |
| 9. | "Gettin' Paper" | Real Talk Ent. | 0:27 |
| 10. | "Speakin' My Language" | Vince V. | 5:19 |
| 11. | "On My Team" | Vince V. | 4:58 |
| 12. | "Pill or Two" | Vince V. | 3:50 |
| 13. | "Givin' It Back" | Big Hollis; Preach | 3:47 |
| 14. | "Purple Lean" | Big Hollis; Preach | 0:47 |
| Total length: | | | 48:42 |

Collector's Edition
| No. | Title | Length |
|---|---|---|
| 15. | "Bosses Make It Rain" (featuring Gudda Gudda) (Bonus track) | 5:11 |
| 16. | "If U Trappin'" (featuring Gudda Gudda) (Bonus track) | 5:49 |

== Personnel ==
- Wesley Eric Weston – rap vocals (tracks: 1–12, 14)
- Rufus Cooper III – rap vocals (tracks: 2–5, 7–8, 10–13)
- Carl Lilly – rap vocals (track 2)
- Walter Hollis – producer (tracks: 1–3, 5, 7–8, 13–14)
- Preach – producer (tracks: 1–3, 5, 7–8, 13–14)
- Vince V. – producer (tracks: 4, 10–12)
- Real Talk Ent. – producer (tracks: 6, 9)
- Derrick Johnson – executive producer
- James "Buck 3000" Olowokere – mixing
- Ken Lee – mastering
- Sintek Design – artwork

== Charts ==
| Chart (2008) | Peak position |
|---|---|
| US Billboard 200 | 137 |
| US Top R&B/Hip-Hop Albums (Billboard) | 31 |
| US Top Rap Albums (Billboard) | 10 |
| US Independent Albums (Billboard) | 20 |
