= Osmosis Jones (soundtrack) =

Soundtrack album by various artists
- Released: August 7, 2001
- Recorded: 2000–2001
- Genres: Hip hop; R&B
- Length: 1:04:22
- Labels: Atlantic; Warner Sunset
- Producers: Beyoncé; De La Soul; James "Groove" Chambers; Jay E; Jazze Pha; Kandi Burruss; Keith Thomas; Kid Rock; Leslie Brathwaite; Mark Hill; Michael Bradford; Mike City; Mono En Stereo; Nick Fury; Righteous Funk Boogie; R. Kelly; One Eye; Talib Kareem

Singles from Osmosis Jones
- 1. "I Believe" Released: December 16, 2008

Professional ratings
Review scores
Source	Rating
AllMusic	2/5 stars

Osmosis Jones: Music from the Motion Picture is the soundtrack album to the 2001 film Osmosis Jones. It was released on August 7, 2001 through Atlantic/Warner Sunset Records and consisted of hip hop and contemporary R&B music. The soundtrack failed to make it to any Billboard charts, but Trick Daddy's single "Take It to da House" managed to make it to 88 on the Billboard Hot 100.

== Track listing ==
No.	Title	Writer(s)	Producer(s)	Length
1.	"Summer in the City" (St. Lunatics)	John Sebastian; Mark Sebastian; Steve Boone	Jason "Jay E" Epperson	4:38
2.	"Big Ball" (Drama)	Terence Cook; Phalon Alexander	Jazze Pha	3:57
3.	"Solo Star" (Solange Knowles)	Beyoncé Knowles; Kandi Burruss; Talib Kareem	Beyoncé; Kandi; Talib Kareem	3:13
4.	"Open" (Brandy)	Michael Flowers	Mike City	4:10
5.	"Fill Me In, Pt. 2" (Craig David)	Craig David; Mark Hill	Mark Hill	4:11
6.	"I Believe" (R. Kelly)	Robert Kelly	R. Kelly	4:54
7.	"Cool, Daddy Cool" (Kid Rock and Joe C.)	Robert J. Ritchie; Bob Crewe; Frank Slay	Kid Rock	3:20
8.	"Turn It Out" (De La Soul and Yummy Bingham)	Kelvin Mercer; David Jolicoeur; Richard Morninglane	R. Thentic; De La Soul	3:49
9.	"Take It to da House" (Trick Daddy and the Slip N' Slide Express)	Maurice Young; Adam Duggins; Mark Seymour; JoVaughn Clark; Katrina Taylor; Corey Evans; Charles Bobbit; Fred Wesley; James Brown; Harry Wayne Casey; Richard Finch	Righteous Funk Boogie	3:47
10.	"Just in Case" (Nivea)	Nivea Hamilton; Leslie Brathwaite; Jasper Cameron; James Harris III; Terry Lewis; Terrance Kelly; Tim Patterson; Garfield Duncan; Dexter Archer	Leslie Brathwaite	3:55
11.	"Why Did You Have to Be" (Debelah Morgan)	Diane Warren	Keith Thomas	4:17
12.	"Don't Be Mad" (Sunshine Anderson and Pinky Tuskedero)	Flowers	Mike City	3:42
13.	"Here We Go Again" (Nappy Roots)	James Chambers III; William Hughes; Vito Tisdale	James "Groove" Chambers	4:07
14.	"Love Me or Leave Me" (Ms. Toi)	Toikeon Parham; Don Saunders; Helen Adu; Andrew Hale	One Eye	4:29
15.	"Rider Like Me" (Ezekiel Lewis)	Ezekiel Lewis; Nicholas Loftin; Terron Mitchell; Johntá Austin; Miri Ben-Ari	Nick "Fury" Loftin	4:33
16.	"Break U Off" (Uncle Kracker)	Matthew Shafer; Michael Bradford	Mike Bradford	3:27
Total length:				1:04:22

== Samples ==
- "Summer in the City" contains an interpolation of "Summer in the City" written by John Sebastian, Mark Sebastian, Steve Boone and performed by The Lovin' Spoonful.
- "Take It to da House" contains excerpts from "The Boss" written and performed by James Brown and "Boogie Shoes" written by Harry Wayne Casey and Richard Finch and performed by KC and the Sunshine Band
- "Just in Case" contains excerpts from "Renee" by the Lost Boyz
- "Love Me or Leave Me" contains a sample from "Pearls" written by Sade Adu and Andrew Hale and performed by Sade
- "Rider Like Me" contains an uncredited interpolation of "Ambitionz az a Ridah" by 2Pac

== Additional songs in the film not on the soundtrack album ==
- "Key to My Heart" written by Craig David and Jeremy Paul and performed by Craig David
- "Groovejet (If This Ain't Love)" written by Cristiano Spiller, Sophie Ellis-Bextor and Rob Davis and performed by Spiller featuring Sophie Ellis-Bextor
- "Hot Blooded (Philip Steir Remix)" written by Mick Jones and Lou Gramm and performed by Foreigner
- "Alone Again (Naturally)" written and performed by Gilbert O'Sullivan
- "Run On (Sharam Instrumental Mix)" written and performed by Moby
- "Pump and Snap" written by Dennis White, Richard Vission, David Schommer and Sam Hollander and performed by Control Freq
- "Fill Me In" written by Craig David and Mark Hill and performed by Craig David
- "The Rockafeller Skank" written and performed by Fatboy Slim and appearing on the teaser trailer and TV spots.
- "Nearer, My God, to Thee" composed by Sarah Fuller Flower Adams appeared in the film but went uncredited as the song is in the public domain.

== Bonus CD Sampler ==
The DVD and VHS release of the film featured a bonus CD sampler showcasing music from Atlantic Records. The first 3 songs are in their entirety, while the rest are only snippets. Only two of the songs featured here are on the soundtrack.

1. Sugar Ray – "Disasterpiece"
2. P.O.D. – "Satellite"
3. Willa Ford – "Ooh Ooh"
4. Craig David – "Fill Me In (Part 2)"
5. Ray J – "Formal Invite"
6. Little-T and One Track Mike – "Fome is Dape"
7. Nappy Roots – "Here We Go Again"
8. Invertigo – "Desensitized"

== "Cool, Daddy Cool" lyrics controversy ==
After the All-American Halftime Show, a conservative program meant as an alternative to the Super Bowl LX halftime show, was announced, some commentators criticized occurrences in Kid Rock's career where he apparently expressed pedophilic attraction. One instance included a part of "Cool, Daddy Cool" that was not included in the film, where Rock states "Young ladies, young ladies, I like ’em underage / See, some say that’s statutory" and Joe C. replies "But I say it’s mandatory". Rock posted a quote attributed to Kobe Bryant about "learning to love to hate", reportedly in response to the criticism.
