= Respect Me =

Respect Me may refer to:

- Respect Me (Tinga Stewart album), 1989
- Respect M.E., a 2006 album by Missy Elliott
- Respect Me (Lil' Flip album), 2009
- "Respect Me", a song by 50 Cent
- "Respect Me", a song by Dizzee Rascal from his 2004 album Showtime
