= The Fast and the Furious (soundtrack) =

The Fast and the Furious: Original Motion Picture Soundtrack

Soundtrack album by various artists
- Released: June 5, 2001
- Recorded: 2000–2001
- Genres: Hip hop; R&B
- Length: 72:13
- Labels: Murder Inc.; Def Jam; Universal
- Producers: Gary Jones (exec.); Happy Walters (exec.); Kathy Nelson (exec.); Neal H. Moritz (exec.); Rob Cohen (exec.); Chris Gotti (co-exec.); 7 Aurelius; Chuckie Madness; Damizza; Dat Nigga Reb; DL; Gee; Irv Gotti; Mr. Fingaz; Nick "Fury" Loftin; R. Kelly; Spkilla; Swizz Beatz; Tru Stylze

Singles from The Fast and the Furious
- 1. "Rollin'" Released: September 5, 2000; 2. "Put It on Me" Released: January 9, 2001; 3. "Good Life (Remix)" Released: May 8, 2001

Professional ratings
Review scores
| Source | Rating |
|---|---|
| AllMusic | 3/5 stars |
| RapReviews | (6.5/10) |

The Fast and the Furious: Original Motion Picture Soundtrack is the first of two soundtracks to Rob Cohen's 2001 action film The Fast and the Furious. It was released on June 5, 2001, by Murder Inc. Records, Def Jam Recordings, and Universal Music Group. Production was handled mostly by Irv Gotti, as well as twelve other record producers, including Channel 7, Damizza, Nick "Fury" Loftin and Swizz Beatz. It features contributions from the film star Ja Rule, along with Armageddon, Ashanti, Black Child, Boo & Gotti, Caddillac Tah, DMX, Faith Evans, Fat Joe, Funkmaster Flex, Limp Bizkit, Method Man, Nate Dogg, N.O.R.E., O-1, Petey Pablo, Redman, R. Kelly, Scarface, Shade Sheist, Tank and Vita. The album reached number seven on the Billboard 200, number five on the Top R&B/Hip-Hop Albums, and went platinum in 2002 in both the United States and Canada.

The lone single released from the soundtrack is "Good Life (Remix)" by Faith Evans. Official music videos were done for "Furious" by Ja Rule, "POV City Anthem" by Cadillac Tah, "Good Life (Remix)" by Faith Evans and "Justify My Love" by Vita.

== Track listing ==
| No. | Title | Writer(s) | Producer(s) | Length |
|---|---|---|---|---|
| 1. | "Good Life (Remix)" (performed by Faith Evans featuring Ja Rule, Vita & Caddillac Tah) | Faith Evans; August Moon; Rasheem Sharrief Pugh; Tamy Lester Smith | Irv Gotti; 7 Aurelius | 3:59 |
| 2. | "Pov City Anthem" (performed by Caddillac Tah) | Tiheem Crocker; Irving Lorenzo; Taiwan Green | Irv Gotti; Mr. Fingers | 4:53 |
| 3. | "When a Man Does Wrong" (performed by Ashanti) | Lorenzo | Irv Gotti; 7 Aurelius; Cevin Fisher | 4:50 |
| 4. | "Race Against Time Part 2" (performed by Tank featuring Ja Rule) | Jeffrey Atkins; Lorenzo; Robert Mays | Irv Gotti | 5:10 |
| 5. | "Furious" (performed by Ja Rule featuring Vita & O1) | Atkins; Otha Miller; Lorenzo; Richard Wilson | Irv Gotti; Dat Nigga Reb | 4:18 |
| 6. | "Take My Time Tonight" (performed by R. Kelly) | Robert Kelly | R. Kelly | 4:29 |
| 7. | "Suicide" (performed by Scarface) | Brad Jordan; Lorenzo; Larry Ogletree | Irv Gotti; DL | 3:53 |
| 8. | "The Prayer" (performed by Black Child) | Ramel Gill; Lorenzo; Gary Solomon | Irv Gotti; Gee | 3:38 |
| 9. | "Tudunn Tudunn Tudunn (Make U Jump)" (performed by Funkmaster Flex featuring Noreaga) | Victor Santiago; William Lora; Edwin Almonte | SPK | 2:41 |
| 10. | "Hustlin'" (performed by Fat Joe featuring Armageddon) | Joseph Cartagena; Nicholas Loftin | Nick "Fury" Loftin | 3:18 |
| 11. | "Freestyle" (performed by Boo & Gotti) | Sabrian "Boo" Sledge; Mwata "Gotti" Mitchell; Lorenzo; Andre Romel Young; Brian Bailey; Cordozar Broadus; Devin Copeland; Marshall Mathers | Irv Gotti | 2:52 |
| 12. | "Rollin' (Urban Assault Vehicle)" (performed by Limp Bizkit featuring DMX, Method Man & Redman) | Fred Durst; Earl Simmons; Reggie Noble; Clifford Smith; Kasseem Dean | Swizz Beatz | 6:18 |
| 13. | "Life Ain't a Game" (performed by Ja Rule) | Atkins; Damian Young; Howie Hersh; Martin Gore | Damizza | 3:32 |
| 14. | "Cali Diseaz" (performed by Shade Sheist featuring Nate Dogg) | Tramayne Thompson; Nathaniel Hale; D. Young | Damizza | 4:00 |
| 15. | "Didn't I" (performed by Petey Pablo) | Moses Barrett III; Charles Shaw | Chuckie Madness | 4:03 |
| 16. | "Put It On Me (Remix)" (performed by Ja Rule featuring Lil' Mo & Vita) | Atkins; Crocker; Lorenzo; Paul Walcott | Irv Gotti; Tru Stylze | 4:42 |
| 17. | "Justify My Love" (performed by Vita featuring Ashanti) | Ingrid Chavez; Lenny Kravitz; Madonna Ciccone | Irv Gotti | 5:37 |
| Total length: | | | | 1:12:13 |

== Charts ==
=== Weekly charts ===
Weekly chart performance for The Fast and the Furious
| Chart (2001) | Peak position |
|---|---|
| Australian Albums (ARIA) | 25 |
| Austrian Albums (Ö3 Austria) | 26 |
| Belgian Albums (Ultratop Flanders) | 39 |
| Belgian Albums (Ultratop Wallonia) | 50 |
| Canadian Albums (Billboard) | 6 |
| French Albums (SNEP) | 99 |
| German Albums (Offizielle Top 100) | 19 |
| New Zealand Albums (RMNZ) | 5 |
| Swiss Albums (Schweizer Hitparade) | 76 |
| US Billboard 200 | 7 |
| US Top R&B/Hip-Hop Albums (Billboard) | 5 |
| US Soundtrack Albums (Billboard) | 1 |

=== Year-end charts ===
Year-end chart performance for The Fast and the Furious
| Chart (2001) | Position |
|---|---|
| Canadian Albums (Nielsen SoundScan) | 74 |
| Canadian R&B Albums (Nielsen SoundScan) | 18 |
| Canadian Rap Albums (Nielsen SoundScan) | 8 |
| US Billboard 200 | 106 |
| US Top R&B/Hip-Hop Albums (Billboard) | 70 |
| US Soundtrack Albums (Billboard) | 6 |

| Chart (2002) | Position |
|---|---|
| Canadian Albums (Nielsen SoundScan) | 166 |
| Canadian R&B Albums (Nielsen SoundScan) | 29 |
| Canadian Rap Albums (Nielsen SoundScan) | 15 |

== Certifications ==
Certifications and sales for The Fast and the Furious
| Region | Certification | Certified units/sales |
|---|---|---|
| Australia (ARIA) | Gold | 35,000^{^} |
| Canada (Music Canada) | Platinum | 100,000^{^} |
| United Kingdom (BPI) | Silver | 60,000^{^} |
| United States (RIAA) | Platinum | 1,000,000^{^} |
^{^} Shipments figures based on certification alone.
