= Atl's Finest =

ATL's Finest

Studio album by J-Bo
- Released: April 15, 2008
- Recorded: 2007
- Genre: Southern hip hop
- Label: Real Talk Entertainment
- Producer: Derrick "Sac" Johnson (exec.); Big Hollis; Vince V.

J-Bo chronology
Ev'rybody Know Me (2005)	ATL's Finest (2008)	Herringbone Jones (2010)

ATL's Finest is the debut solo studio album by American rapper J-Bo of Atlanta-based hip hop duo YoungBloodZ. It was released on April 15, 2008 via Real Talk Entertainment.

== Track listing ==
No.	Title	Length
1.	"ATL's Finest"	1:05
2.	"Look at Me Now"	4:38
3.	"A-Town"	4:00
4.	"I'm a Problem"	4:23
5.	"Another Level"	0:30
6.	"Make Me Rich"	3:50
7.	"Pull It Off the Lot"	3:19
8.	"Back to You"	3:38
9.	"My Life"	4:11
10.	"After the Show"	3:53
11.	"What I Do"	0:37
12.	"I'm Still a Problem" (featuring Lil Scrappy)	4:23
13.	"Herringbone Jones"	1:02

== Charts ==
Chart (2008)	Peak position
US Top R&B/Hip-Hop Albums (Billboard)	76
