= Ahead of My Time =

Studio album by Lil' Flip
- Released: July 6, 2010
- Recorded: 2007–2010
- Genre: Hip hop, Southern hip hop
- Length: 78:50.03
- Label: Clover G

Lil' Flip chronology
| Underground Legend 2 (2009) | Ahead of My Time (2010) | The Black Dr. Kevorian (2013) |

Singles from Ahead of My Time
- 1. "Heartbreaker" Released: December 1, 2009

Ahead of My Time is the fourth independent album and seventh overall studio album by rapper Lil' Flip, released on July 6, 2010.

== Promotion ==
The first single from the album is "Heartbreaker", which features Eeden & Sean Thomas.

== Videos ==
A video was released for "50 in My Pinkyrang" on July 17, 2010.

Another video was released for "Heartbreaker" on August 6, 2010.

== Background ==
Ahead of My Time was originally set to be released as early as 2007, but was pushed back many times, and was finally released on July 6, 2010.

Lil' Flip released two "album-before-the-album's" in 2009 to help promote the release of Ahead of My Time.

The two albums were: Respect Me and Underground Legend 2.

== Sales ==
Despite the extra promotion the album sold only 205 copies the first week it was available.

== Track listing ==
| No. | Title | Producer(s) | Length |
|---|---|---|---|
| 1. | "Long Live da King" | Dwayne Gilbert | 4:44 |
| 2. | "48 Laws of Power" (featuring David Crayton) | Oscar White | 4:00 |
| 3. | "Flyboy Status" | Sean Thomas Thornton | 3:49 |
| 4. | "U R the 1" (featuring Big Hollis) | Big Hollis | 3:56 |
| 5. | "H-Town State of Mind" | Dwayne Gilbert | 4:33 |
| 6. | "Shawty Wanna Roll" (featuring Jay Townsend) | J Silva | 4:53 |
| 7. | "The Flip Gate$ Story" | Sean Thomas Thornton | 3:46 |
| 8. | "I'm Fresh" | J Silva | 2:14 |
| 9. | "Krazy" (featuring Poosty Lee and Bionik) | Sandy Wiley | 3:35 |
| 10. | "Heartbreaker" (featuring Sean Thomas and Eden) | Peter Johan Frutiger | 3:26 |
| 11. | "U Don't Know Me Like Dat" (featuring Jay Townsend) | Bass Heavy | 4:11 |
| 12. | "50 in My Pinkyrang" (featuring Chamillionaire and Gudda Gudda) | Essay Potna | 4:24 |
| 13. | "I Like...." | Sean Thomas Thornton | 2:47 |
| 14. | "Da Trill Is Back!!!" | Kino | 4:35 |
| 15. | "Keep Dem Hataz Away" (featuring A-Dub) | A-Dub | 2:32 |
| 16. | "U See It, Pt. 2" | Dwayne Gilbert | 4:00 |
| 17. | "Not 4 Sale" (featuring David Crayton) | Kino | 4:00 |
| 18. | "She Like My Swagger" (featuring Bobby Moon) | JStarz | 3:59 |
| 19. | "My Family Tree" | J Silva & P Silva | 3:34 |
| 20. | "I Just Wanna" | JStarz | 5:52 |
