= Kings of the South =

Studio album by Lil' Flip and Z-Ro
- Released: March 29, 2005
- Recorded: 2004–2005
- Genres: Southern hip hop; gangsta rap
- Length: 58:37
- Labels: PayDay; Clover G
- Producers: Lil' Flip (also exec.); Z-Ro (also exec.); Price; Mike Dean; Oomp Camp

Lil' Flip chronology
U Gotta Feel Me (2004)	Kings of the South (2005)	I Need Mine (2007)

Z-Ro chronology
The Life of Joseph W. McVey (2004)	Kings of the South (2005)	Let the Truth Be Told (2005)

Professional ratings
Review scores
Source	Rating
RapReviews	6/10

Kings of the South is a collaborative album by American rappers Lil' Flip and Z-Ro. It was released on March 29, 2005 via Pay Day/Clover G Records. Production was handled by Price, Mike Dean, Oomp Camp, Lil' Flip and Z-Ro. It features guest appearances from Will-Lean, Point Blank, Trae tha Truth, B.G. Duke, C-Note, Da Black Al Capone and Yukmouth. A sequel, Kingz of the South, Vol. 2, was released on March 29, 2025.

== Track listing ==
No.	Title	Producer(s)	Length
1.	"Kings of the South"	Lil' Flip	3:15
2.	"Fuck Dat Nigga" (featuring Will-Lean, BG Duke and Point Blank)	Price	5:24
3.	"Burbans & Lacs"	Price	4:20
4.	"Uncut"	Z-Ro	2:38
5.	"Grown Man"	Price	3:59
6.	"Da Cops" (featuring Trae)	Lil' Flip	4:51
7.	"Art of War"	Price	5:12
8.	"Whut Up Now" (featuring Will-Lean)	Price	3:47
9.	"Remember Me"	Price	3:58
10.	"Get It Crunk" (featuring Yukmouth)	Oomp Camp	5:44
11.	"Never Take Me Alive" (featuring Will-Lean, Da Black Al Capone and Trae)	Z-Ro	5:17
12.	"Never Let the Game Go"	Mike Dean	5:19
13.	"Screwed Up Click" (featuring Will-Lean, Point Blank and C-Note)	Price	4:53
Total length:			58:37

== Charts ==
Chart (2005)	Peak position
US Top R&B/Hip-Hop Albums (Billboard)	57
US Independent Albums (Billboard)	48
