= Real Talk Entertainment =

American privately held record label

Real Talk
- Parent company: Universal Music Group
- Founded: 2003; 23 years ago
- Founder: Derrick "Sac" Johnson
- Distributors: Universal Music Group, Koch, Fontana
- Genre: Hip-hop
- Country of origin: U.S.
- Location: Sacramento, California
- Official website: realtalkent.com

Real Talk Ent. is an American privately held record label that was started in 2003. It is led by CEO/President Derrick "Sac" Johnson and is focused primarily on acquiring and distributing unreleased music from high profiled artists.

== Studio albums ==
=== 2004 ===
- Spice 1 & MC Eiht – The Pioneers
- Kool Keith – Dr. Octagon Part 2
- Hollow Tip – Ghetto Famous
- D-Shot – Bosses In The Booth

=== 2006 ===
- Outlawz – Against All Oddz
- Layzie Bone – Thug Brothers
- Spice 1 & MC Eiht – Keep It Gangsta
- Bizzy Bone – The Story
- Dead Prez & Outlawz – Soldier 2 Soldier
- Celly Cel – The Wild West
- Spice 1 – Life After Jive: 2000 to 2005
- Bizzy Bone – The Midwest Cowboy
- Celly Cel – The Hillside Stranglaz: Bad Influence
- Brotha Lynch Hung & MC Eiht – The New Season

=== 2007 ===
- Bone Thugs-N-Harmony – Bone Brothers 2
- Bizzy Bone – Trials & Tribulations
- Bizzy Bone – Best of Bizzy Bone

=== 2008 ===
- Pastor Troy – Attitude Adjuster
- Lil' Flip – All Eyez on Us
- Bone Thugs-N-Harmony – Still Creepin on Ah Come Up
- 8Ball – Doin' It Big
- YoungBloodZ – ATL's Finest
- MJG – Pimp Tight
- Lil' Scrappy – Prince of the South

=== 2009 ===
- Hell Rell – Hard as Hell
- Freeway – Philadelphia Freeway 2
- Haystak – The Natural II
- Sheek Louch – Life on D-Block
- Lil' Flip & Gudda Gudda – Certified
- AZ – Legendary
- Pastor Troy – Ready For War

=== 2010 ===
- Case – Here, My Love
- Devin the Dude – Gotta Be Me
- Pastor Troy – Attitude Adjuster 2
- Bizzy Bone – Best of Bizzy Bone Vol. 2
- Young Buck – The Rehab
- Spice 1 – Best of Spice 1 Vol. 2
- Pastor Troy – Best of Pastor Troy Vol. 1
- Pastor Troy – Best of Pastor Troy Vol. 2
- 8Ball & MJG – From the Bottom 2 the Top
- Chingy – Success & Failure
- Lil Scrappy – Prince of the South 2

=== 2017 ===
- Lil Wyte – Drugs
- Dorrough – Ride Wit Me
- Gorilla Zoe – Don't Feed Tha Animals 2
- Mozzy & Gunplay – Dreadlocks & Headshots
- Gunplay – The Plug
- Bone Thugs-N-Harmony & Outlawz – Thug Brothers 2
- Krayzie Bone – Eternal Legend
- Stalley – New Wave
- Lil Wyte – Liquor
- Gorilla Zoe – Gorilla Warfare
- Gunplay – Haram
- Bone Thugs-N-Harmony & Outlawz – Thug Brothers 3
- Krayzie Bone - E.1999: The LeathaFace Project
- Stalley – Another Level
- Young Dro – Da' Real Atlanta

=== 2019 ===
- Mozzy – Chop Stixx & Banana Clips
- Krayzie Bone – Nothing Left To Prove
- Young Dro – HyDROponic
- Bone Thugs-n-Harmony – Greatest Hits (Real Talk Ent. Edition)
- Young Buck – The Rehab: Remixed

=== 2022 ===
- Snoop Dogg – Metaverse: The NFT Drop, Vol. 1
- Snoop Dogg – Metaverse: The NFT Drop, Vol. 2
