= Connected (Lil' Flip and Mr. Capone-E album) =

Studio album by Lil' Flip & Mr. Capone-E
- Released: November 14, 2006
- Recorded: 2006
- Genres: Southern hip hop, Chicano rap, West Coast hip hop, gangsta rap
- Length: 71:48
- Label: Hi-Power Entertainment
- Producers: Fingazz, Mr. Criminal

Connected is the first of three collaboration albums between rappers Lil' Flip and Mr. Capone-E.

== Track listing ==
1. Where I Stay (Lil' Flip and Mr. Capone-E)
2. On Da Block (Lil' Flip)
3. Hustle For The Same Thing (Lil' Flip and Mr. Capone-E)
4. Who Runs This {Lil' Flip)
5. King Of Da Streets (Lil Flip and Mr. Capone-E)
6. Gangster Trippen (Mr. Capone-E)
7. What You Know Bout The South (Lil' Flip)
8. Gangster Paradise (Mr. Capone-E)
9. Name Out Yo Mouth (Lil' Flip)
10. Still The King (Skit) (Lil' Flip)
11. Ride With a Gangsta (Lil' Flip)
12. Of a Soldier (Mr. Capone-E)
13. In H-Town (Lil' Flip)
14. You Know My Name (Mr. Capone-E)
15. Flat Out (Lil' Flip)
16. Show Tonite (Lil' Flip)
17. Get This Money (Lil' Flip}
18. Riden Dirty (Lil' Flip)
19. The Interview

== See also ==
- Still Connected
- Lil' Flip discography
- Southern hip hop
- Chicano rap
- West Coast hip hop
