= The Hip-Hop Violinist =

Studio album by Miri Ben-Ari
- Released: August 23, 2005
- Recorded: 2003–2005
- Studio: Cash Money Studios (Louisiana); Chung King Studios (New York); Mirimode Studios (New Jersey); Morris Studio (Zagreb); Sony Music Studios (New York); Touch Of Jazz Studios (Philadelphia); TransContinental Studios (Florida); Tree Sound Studios (Georgia)
- Genre: Hip hop; jazz; R&B
- Length: 58:30
- Label: Universal
- Producer: Akon; Baby Dooks; Dash; Kanye West; Kere Brown; Midi Mafia; Miri Ben-Ari; Nick Fury; Ohad Ben-Ari; P. King; P-Nut

Miri Ben-Ari chronology
Song of the Promised Land (2000)	The Hip-Hop Violinist (2005)

Singles from The Hip-Hop Violinist
- 1. "We Gonna Win" Released: August 30, 2005; 2. "Jump & Spread Out" Released: 2005; 3. "Sunshine to the Rain" Released: September 25, 2006

Professional ratings
Review scores
Source	Rating
AllMusic	3/5 stars
IGN	4.9/10
PopMatters	6/10
RapReviews	8.5/10
Slant	2/5 stars

The Hip-Hop Violinist is the third studio album by American–Israeli musician Miri Ben-Ari. It was released on August 23, 2005, via Universal Records, making it her major label debut. Recording sessions took place at Cash Money Studios in Louisiana, Chung King Studios and Sony Music Studios in New York City, Mirimode Studios in New Jersey, Morris Studio in Zagreb, Touch of Jazz Studios in Philadelphia, TransContinental Studios in Florida and Tree Sound Studios in Georgia. Production was handled by Miri herself together with her brother Ohad, as well as Baby Dooks, Kanye West, Akon, Dash, Kere Brown, Midi Mafia, Nick Fury, P. King and P-Nut. It features guest appearances from Anthony Hamilton, Fatman Scoop, Akon, Algebra, Birdman, Consequence, Doug E. Fresh, Fabolous, J. Ivy, John Legend, Kanye West, Lil' Mo, Lil' Wayne, Musiq Soulchild, Pharoahe Monch, Pitbull, Scarface, Six-Shot, Styles P, Vicious, Zion & Lennox. Its single, "Sunshine to the Rain", peaked at No. 39 on the R&B & hip-hop singles chart and No. 46 on the independent singles chart in the UK music charts.

== Track listing ==
No.	Title	Writer(s)	Length
1.	"Intro"	Miri Ben-Ari	0:37
2.	"We Gonna Win" (featuring Styles P)	M. Ben-Ari; David Styles; Dražen Kvočić; Ohad Ben-Ari	4:28
3.	"Jump & Spread Out" (featuring Fatman Scoop and Vicious)	M. Ben-Ari; Isaac Freeman; Quame Riley; David Vurdelja	4:04
4.	"Fly Away" (featuring Fabolous, Kanye West and Musiq Soulchild)	M. Ben-Ari; John David Jackson; Kanye Omari West; George Duke	3:54
5.	"Hold Your Head Up High" (featuring Lil' Mo)	M. Ben-Ari; Cynthia Loving; Vurdelja	5:02
6.	"Sunshine to the Rain" (featuring Scarface and Anthony Hamilton)	M. Ben-Ari; Brad Jordan; Anthony Cornelius Hamilton; Nicholaus Gerard Loftin	4:31
7.	"Lord of the Strings" (featuring J. Ivy)	M. Ben-Ari; James Ivy Richardson; O. Ben-Ari	1:36
8.	"Chillin' in the Key of E / Outside The Box"	M. Ben-Ari; Robert Kyle Frost; Ronald Frost	3:04
9.	"Miss Melody" (featuring Akon)	M. Ben-Ari; Aliaune Thiam	4:55
10.	"New World Symphony" (featuring Pharoahe Monch)	M. Ben-Ari; Troy Jamerson; West	4:25
11.	"4 Flat Tires" (featuring Baby, Lil' Wayne and 6 Shot)	M. Ben-Ari; Bryan Williams; Dwayne Carter; Jermaine Tucker; Waynne Jason Nugent; Kevin John Risto; Al Green; Willie Mitchell	4:58
12.	"She Was Just a Friend" (featuring Anthony Hamilton and Algebra)	M. Ben-Ari; Hamilton; Algebra Felicia Blessett; O. Ben-Ari	4:44
13.	"I've Been Waiting on You" (featuring Consequence and John Legend)	M. Ben-Ari; Dexter Mills; John Roger Stephens; Peter Francis; Green; Mitchell	4:16
14.	"The Star-Spangled Banner" (featuring Doug E. Fresh)	M. Ben-Ari; John Stafford Smith	2:52
15.	"Jump & Spread Out (Reggaetone Remix)" (featuring Fatman Scoop, Zion & Lennox and Pitbull)	M. Ben-Ari; Freeman; Félix Ortiz; Gabriel Pizarro; Armando Pérez; Vurdelja; Riley	4:15
Total length:			58:30

Sample credits

- Track 4 contains elements from "Fly Away" written and performed by George Duke from his 1983 album Guardian of the Light.

Notes

- The song "Jump & Spread Out" has been wildly misattributed as a remix of Zion & Lennox and Daddy Yankee song "Yo Voy", since they contribute to this song with some lyrics from their own song. The song has also been alternately titled "¿Dónde Están Las Mamis?" from their 2005 Motivando a La Yal: Special Edition album.

== Personnel ==
- Miri Ben-Ari – vocals (track 1), violin, string arrangements, engineering, mixing, producer
- David "Styles P" Styles – vocals (track 2)
- Clarence "Don Parma" Hutchinson – backing vocals (track 2)
- Denim – backing vocals (track 2)
- Isaac "Fatman Scoop" Freeman III – vocals (tracks: 3, 15)
- Quame "Vicious" Riley – vocals (track 3)
- John "Fabolous" Jackson – vocals (track 4)
- Kanye West – vocals (track 4), producer (tracks: 4, 10)
- Taalib "Musiq Soulchild" Johnson – vocals (track 4)
- Cynthia "Lil' Mo" Loving – vocals (track 5)
- Brad "Scarface" Jordan – vocals (track 6)
- Anthony Hamilton – vocals (tracks: 6, 12)
- James Ivy "J. Ivy" Richardson II – vocals (track 7)
- Aliaune Akon Thiam – vocals & producer (track 9)
- Troy "Pharoahe Monch" Jamerson – vocals (track 10)
- Alana Atkins – choir (track 10)
- Bryan Sledge – choir (track 10)
- Richard T. Sledge – choir (track 10)
- Shanta N. Atkins – choir (track 10)
- Thamasina A. Atkins – choir (track 10)
- Traci Brown – choir (track 10)
- John Legend – additional choir (track 10), background vocals (track 11), vocals (track 13)
- Bryan "Baby/Birdman" Williams – vocals (track 11)
- Dwayne "Lil' Wayne" Carter – vocals (track 11)
- Jermaine "Six Shot" Tucker – vocals (track 11)
- Algebra Blessett – vocals (track 12)
- Dexter "Consequence" Mills Jr. – vocals (track 13)
- Douglas "Doug E. Fresh" Davis – human beatbox (track 14)
- Félix "Zion" Ortiz – vocals (track 15)
- Gabriel "Lennox" Pizarro – vocals (track 15)
- Armando "Pitbull" Pérez – vocals (track 15)
- Quartet Sebastian – strings (track 2)
- Hrvoje Pintaric – French horn (track 2)
- Vanja Lisjak – trombone (track 2)
- Andrej Jakuš – trumpet (track 2)
- David "Baby Dooks" Vurdelja – keyboards (track 5), producer (tracks: 3, 5, 15), remixing (track 15)
- Predrag "P'Eggy" Martinjak – keyboards & co-producer (track 5)
- Nick "Fury" Loftin – keyboards & producer (track 6)
- Dražen "Dash" Kvočić – producer (track 2)
- Robert Kyle "Kere Brown" Frost – producer (track 8)
- Ronald "P-Nut" Frost – producer (track 8)
- Waynne Jason "Bruce Waynne" Nugent – producer (track 11)
- Kevin "Dirty Swift" Risto – producer (track 11)
- Peter "P. King" Francis – producer (track 13)
- Ohad "Big O" Ben-Ari – orchestration, engineering, mixing, producer
- Pablo Arraya – engineering
- Leslie Brathwaite – mixing
- Kevin Crouse – mixing
- Jason Goldstein – mixing
- John Holmes – engineering
- Fabian Marasciullo – engineering
- Carlos "Storm" Martinez – engineering
- Axel Niehaus – mixing
- Tatsuya Sato – engineering
- Song Shin – mixing assistant
- Miro Vidovic – engineering
- Bill Wathen – engineering
- Chris Gehringer – mastering
- Daniel Glogower – executive producer, A&R
- Rik Robinson – executive producer, A&R
- Sandy Brummels – creative director
- Adam Weiss – photography
