= Game Over (Flip) =

Single by Lil' Flip

from the album U Gotta Feel Me
- Released: February 13, 2004
- Recorded: August 2003
- Genre: Hardcore hip hop, southern hip hop
- Length: 3:52
- Label: Sucka Free, Sony Urban, Columbia
- Songwriter(s): Wesley Eric Weston Jr.: Nicholaus Gerard Loftin
- Producer(s): Nick "Fury" Loftin

Lil' Flip singles chronology
"The Way We Ball" (2002)	"Game Over (Flip)" (2004)	"Sunshine" (2004)

"Game Over (Flip)" is the lead single released from Lil' Flip's third album U Gotta Feel Me.

The song became Flip's first top 40 hit, peaking at number 15 on the Billboard Hot 100, while also reaching the top 10 on both the R&B and rap singles charts. The official remix featured fellow rappers Young Buck and Bun B. There is a second official remix featuring West Coast rappers Snoop Dogg & The Game and a new verse by Lil Flip.

== Lawsuit ==
In 2004, Namco filed a lawsuit against Lil' Flip, Sony BMG, and several others for willful copyright infringement. The lawsuit, by Namco, filed in New York Federal Court, stemmed from "Game Over (Flip)" noticeably sampling various sounds from the Namco games Pac-Man and Ms. Pac-Man.

It followed on the heels of a separate copyright infringement lawsuit against the same group of defendants involving Lil' Flip's previous album, Undaground Legend, which ended in a $150,000 judgement awarded to the plaintiffs.

Namco's lawsuit, however, was settled amicably before reaching trial, for an undisclosed sum, along with the parties releasing a joint statement which read, “Namco and Sony BMG are pleased to have resolved this matter and we look forward to continuing our business relationship in the spirit of our mutual respect for intellectual property.”

== Charts ==
=== Weekly charts ===
Chart (2004)	Peak position
US Billboard Hot 100	15
US Hot R&B/Hip-Hop Songs (Billboard)	8
US Hot Rap Songs (Billboard)	4
US Rhythmic (Billboard)	9

=== Year-end charts ===
Chart (2004)	Position
US Billboard Hot 100	65
US Hot R&B/Hip-Hop Songs (Billboard)	34
US Hot Rap Songs (Billboard)	20

== Certifications ==
Region	Certification	Certified units/sales
United States (RIAA) Mastertone	Platinum	1,000,000^{^}
^{^} Shipments figures based on certification alone.

== Release history ==
Region	Date	Format(s)	Label(s)	Ref.
United States	February 2, 2004	Urban contemporary radio	Sucka Free, Loud, Columbia	
United States	February 23, 2004	Rhythmic contemporary radio	Sucka Free, Loud, Columbia	
United States	May 10, 2004	Contemporary hit radio	Sucka Free, Loud, Columbia	
