= Ghetto Mindstate (Can't Get Away) =

""Ghetto Mindstate""

Single by Lil' Flip featuring Lyfe Jennings

from the album I Need Mine
- Released: January 30, 2007
- Recorded: 2006
- Genre: Gangsta rap, R&B
- Length: 3:54
- Label: Warner Bros., Asylum Records, Clover G Records
- Songwriter: W. Weston/C. Hassan/S. Lal/C. Jennings
- Producer: The Synphony

Lil' Flip singles chronology
"What It Do" (2006)	""Ghetto Mindstate"" (2007)	"Heartbreaker" (2009)

Lyfe Jennings singles chronology
"Cops Out" (2007)	"Ghetto Mindstate" (2007)	"Never Never Land" (2008)

"Ghetto Mindstate" is the first single from Lil' Flip's album, I Need Mine. It features Lyfe Jennings. The song peaked at #77 on the Billboard Top R&B/Hip-Hop Singles & Tracks chart.

== Other versions ==
These two versions were released on an EP along with the original version.

1. Ghetto Mindstate (Radio Version)
2. Ghetto Mindstate (Instrumental)

== Music video ==
The music video features the actor Tristan Wilds and the late rapper Young Argo. The video premiered on BET's Access Granted on January 10, 2007.
