= Sunshine (Lil' Flip song) =

2004 single by Lil' Flip

Single by Lil' Flip featuring Lea

from the album U Gotta Feel Me
- B-side: "The Ghetto"
- Released: May 24, 2004
- Length: 3:47
- Label: Sony Urban Music; Sucka Free; Columbia
- Songwriters: Wesley E. Weston; Carlos Hassan; Sandy Lal
- Producer: The Synphony

Lil' Flip singles chronology
"Game Over (Flip)" (2004)	"Sunshine" (2004)	"What It Do" (2005)

"Sunshine" is a song by American hip hop recording artist Lil' Flip, released May 24, 2004, as the second single from his third album, U Gotta Feel Me (2004). The song, produced by the Synphony, features vocals by American singer Lea. It reached number two on the US Billboard Hot 100, Hot Rap Tracks, and Hot R&B/Hip-Hop Singles & Tracks charts, stuck in each case behind Terror Squad's "Lean Back".

The official remix of "Sunshine" is called "Baby Boy, Baby Girl" and originally featured singer Amerie, but she was later replaced by Lea. The remix samples The Notorious B.I.G.'s 1997 single "Hypnotize". In 2022, American rapper Tyga remade the song adding new lyrics, featuring American singer Jhené Aiko and American rapper Pop Smoke.

== Track listings ==
US 12-inch single

A1. "Baby Boy, Baby Girl" (Sunshine remix featuring Lea—explicit) – 3:41
A2. "Baby Boy, Baby Girl" (Sunshine remix featuring Lea—clean) – 3:40
A3. "Baby Boy, Baby Girl" (Sunshine remix featuring Lea—instrumental) – 3:40
A4. "Sunshine" (featuring Lea—explicit) – 3:45
B1. "The Ghetto" (explicit) – 2:22
B2. "The Ghetto" (clean) – 2:22
B3. "The Ghetto" (instrumental) – 2:30
B4. "The Ghetto" (explicit a cappella) – 1:37

UK CD single

1. "Sunshine" (clean album version) – 3:45
2. "Baby Boy, Baby Girl" (Sunshine remix—explicit album version) – 3:41
3. "Game Over" (flip—clean remix) – 4:25
4. "Sunshine" (video) – 4:00

European CD single

1. "Sunshine" (featuring Lea) – 3:45
2. "Sunshine" (Kingpin remix featuring Lea—dirty) – 3:56

== Charts ==
=== Weekly charts ===
Chart (2004)	Peak position
Canada CHR/Pop Top 30 (Radio & Records)	8
France (SNEP)	36
New Zealand (Recorded Music NZ)	10
Scottish Singles Sales (Official Charts)	42
UK Singles (Official Charts)	14
UK Hip Hop/R&B (Official Charts)	3
US Billboard Hot 100	2
US Hot R&B/Hip-Hop Songs (Billboard)	2
US Hot Rap Songs (Billboard)	2
US Pop Airplay (Billboard)	6
US Rhythmic Airplay (Billboard)	1

=== Year-end charts ===
Chart (2004)	Position
UK Urban (Music Week) "Sunshine" / "Baby Boy, Baby Girl"	22
US Billboard Hot 100	20
US Hot R&B/Hip-Hop Singles & Tracks (Billboard)	36
US Hot Rap Tracks (Billboard)	9
US Mainstream Top 40 (Billboard)	41
US Rhythmic Top 40 (Billboard)	8

== Certifications ==
Region	Certification	Certified units/sales
United States (RIAA)	Gold	500,000^{*}
^{*} Sales figures based on certification alone.

== Release history ==
Region	Date	Format(s)	Label(s)	Ref.
United States	May 24, 2004	Rhythmic contemporary; urban radio	Sony Urban Music; Sucka Free; Columbia	
United States	July 12, 2004	Contemporary hit radio	Sony Urban Music; Sucka Free; Columbia	
United Kingdom	October 18, 2004	12-inch vinyl; CD	Columbia	
