= U Gotta Feel Me =

Studio album by Lil' Flip
- Released: March 30, 2004
- Recorded: 2003–04
- Genres: Hip hop, southern hip hop
- Length: 1:26:32
- Labels: Clover G; Sucka Free; Columbia; Sony Urban
- Producers: Carl So-Lowe; David Banner; DJ Paul; Juicy J; Nick "Fury" Loftin; Oomp Camp; Play-N-Skillz; Red Spyda; The Heatmakerz; The Synphony

Lil' Flip chronology
Undaground Legend (2002)	U Gotta Feel Me (2004)	I Need Mine (2007)

Singles from U Gotta Feel Me
- 1. "Game Over (Flip)" Released: February 13, 2004; 2. "Sunshine" Released: May 21, 2004

Professional ratings
Review scores
Source	Rating
AllMusic	3/5 stars
Now	3/5 Ns
RapReviews	7.5/10
Rolling Stone	3/5 stars

U Gotta Feel Me is the third solo studio album by American rapper Lil' Flip. It was released on March 30, 2004, via Columbia Records, Sony Urban Music and Lil Flip's Clover G and Sucka Free. Production was handled by Play-N-Skillz, Red Spyda, The Synphony, Carl-So-Lowe, David Banner, DJ Paul, Juicy J, Nick Fury, Oomp Camp and The Heatmakerz. It features guest appearances from Will-Lean, David Banner, Baby D, Butch Cassidy, Cam'ron, Grafh, Gravy, Jim Jones, Killer Mike, Lea, Ludacris, Pastor Troy, Shawty Beezlee, Skillz, Static Major, Three 6 Mafia and Tity Boi.

The album's lead single, "Game Over (Flip)", reached number 15 on the Billboard Hot 100 and number 8 on the Hot R&B/Hip-Hop Songs charts. The follow-up single, "Sunshine", went to number 2 on both the Billboard Hot 100 and Hot R&B/Hip-Hop Songs becoming Lil' Flip's biggest hit of his career.

The album debuted at number 4 on the US Billboard 200 chart, becoming Lil' Flip's highest-charting album to date. On August 18, 2004, the album was certified Platinum by the Recording Industry Association of America, making it Lil' Flip's best selling album. The chopped and screwed version made by Paul Wall titled U Gotta Feel Me: Chopped & Screwed peaked at number 42 on the Top R&B/Hip-Hop Albums chart.

== Track listing ==
No.	Title	Writer(s)	Producer(s)	Length
1.	"I Came to Bring the Pain" (featuring Ludacris, Static Major and Tity Boi)	Wesley Eric Weston; Christopher Bridges; Stephen Garrett; Tauheed Epps; Oscar Salinas; Juan Salinas, Jr.; Clifford Smith; Robert Diggs	Play-N-Skillz	4:47
2.	"The Ghetto"	Weston; Gregory Green; Sean Thomas; Glenn Charles Watts; James Leonard Jones; Sylvester Thompson	The Heatmakerz	2:22
3.	"Bounce"	Weston; Salinas; Salinas, Jr.	Play-N-Skillz	4:31
4.	"All I Know" (featuring Cam'ron)	Weston; Cameron Giles; Salinas; Salinas, Jr.	Play-N-Skillz	2:56
5.	"Game Over (Flip)"	Weston; Nicholaus Loftin	Nick Fury	3:52
6.	"Sun Don't Shine"	Weston; Salinas; Salinas, Jr.	Play-N-Skillz	3:25
7.	"Represent" (featuring Three 6 Mafia and David Banner)	Weston; Paul Beauregard; Jordan Houston; Darnell Carlton; Ricky Dunigan; Lavell Crump	DJ Paul; Juicy J	4:32
8.	"Rags 2 Riches" (featuring Will-Lean)	Weston; William Gibbs; Salinas; Salinas, Jr.	Play-N-Skillz	4:09
9.	"Ain't No Party" (featuring Will-Lean)	Weston; Gibbs; Salinas; Salinas, Jr.	Play-N-Skillz	3:46
10.	"Check (Let's Ride)"	Weston; Andy Thelusma	Red Spyda	3:48
11.	"Dem Boyz"	Weston; Salinas; Salinas, Jr.	Play-N-Skillz	4:04
12.	"Sunshine" (featuring Lea)	Weston; Lea Quezada; Sandy Lal; Carlos Hassan	The Synphony	3:45
13.	"Y'all Don't Want It" (featuring Jim Jones)	Weston; Joseph Jones; Salinas; Salinas, Jr.	Play-N-Skillz	4:51
14.	"We Ain't Playin" (featuring Pastor Troy, Baby D, Killer Mike and Shawty Beezlee)	Weston; Micah Troy; Donald Jenkins; Michael Render; Haborsky Gordon; Howard Simmons; Korey Roberson; Montay Humphrey	Oomp Camp	4:36
15.	"U Neva Know" (featuring Butch Cassidy)	Weston; Carl Lowe, Jr.; Lal; Greg Brown; Cameron Mosely	Carl So-Lowe; The Synphony	4:08
16.	"Throw Up Yo' Hood"	Weston; Salinas; Salinas, Jr.	Play-N-Skillz	3:20
17.	"Drugz (Screwed)"	Weston; Salinas; Salinas, Jr.	Play-N-Skillz	4:36
18.	"Where I'm From" (featuring Grafh, Gravy and Will-Lean)	Weston; Phillip Bernard; Jamal Woolard; Gibbs; Thelusma	Red Spyda	4:59
19.	"Dem Boyz Remix (Screwed)" (featuring Skillz)	Weston; Salinas; Salinas, Jr.	Play-N-Skillz	5:16
20.	"What's My Name"	Weston; Salinas; Salinas, Jr.	Play-N-Skillz	5:13
21.	"Ain't No Nigga" (featuring David Banner)	Weston; Crump	David Banner	3:36
Total length:				1:26:32

== Chart performance ==
=== Weekly charts ===
Chart (2004)	Peak position
Canadian Albums (Nielsen SoundScan)	119
Canadian R&B Albums (Nielsen SoundScan)	30
US Billboard 200	4
US Top R&B/Hip-Hop Albums (Billboard)	2

=== Year-end charts ===
Chart (2004)	Position
US Billboard 200	66
US Top R&B/Hip-Hop Albums (Billboard)	19

== Certifications ==
Region	Certification	Certified units/sales
United States (RIAA)	Platinum	1,000,000^{^}
^{^} Shipments figures based on certification alone.
