= The Leprechaun (Lil' Flip album) =

Studio album by Lil' Flip
- Released: July 18, 2000
- Recorded: 1999–2000
- Genres: Southern hip hop; gangsta rap
- Length: 2:03:34
- Label: Sucka Free
- Producers: Greg; Jhiame; J.P. Nitty; Sean "Solo" Jemison; Todd; Willo

Lil' Flip chronology
Hustlaz Stackin' Endz (1999)	The Leprechaun (2000)	Undaground Legend (2002)

Singles from The Leprechaun
- 1. "I Can Do Dat" Released: September 26, 2000

Professional ratings
Review scores
Source	Rating
AllMusic	3/5 stars
RapReviews	7/10

The Leprechaun is the debut solo studio album by American rapper Lil' Flip. It was released on July 18, 2000, through Sucka Free Records. It was produced by Willo, J.P. Nitty, Todd, Greg, Jhiame, and Sean "Solo" Jemison, with Hump and Lil' Flip serving as executive producers. It features guest appearances from B.G. Duke, Scoopastar, Big Shasta, Cresia, Ron Wilson, Taz, Will-Lean, Yung Redd, Big Hawk, Big James, Chris Ward, C-Note, Crime, Dee, Deep Threat, E.S.G., Godfather, Hump, Lil' Key, Lil' Marquice, Slim Thug, South Park Mexican, and T.C.

The album peaked at No. 67 on the Top R&B/Hip-Hop Albums, No. 34 on the Independent Albums and No. 36 on the Heatseekers Albums. It features a promotional single "I Can Do Dat". A sequel to the album was released in 2020 titled The Leprechaun 2.

== Track listing ==
No.	Title	Producer(s)	Length
1.	"Da Freestyle King Award"		0:49
2.	"I Got Flow"	J.P. Nitty	4:13
3.	"Everyday" (featuring T.C., Lil' Marquice, Taz, Big Shasta and Cresia)	Greg	4:37
4.	"My Block" (featuring Crime, Dee and Godfather)	J.P. Nitty	4:15
5.	"Realest Rhymin'" (featuring Slim Thug and E.S.G.)	Sean "Solo" Jemison	4:03
6.	"Gotta Be Me" (featuring Cresia)	Willo	4:48
7.	"Put Yo Fist Up" (featuring South Park Mexican and Yung Redd)	Todd	4:38
8.	"Boxers" (featuring Deep Threat)	Jhiame	4:44
9.	"On Point" (featuring Big James)	Willo	3:28
10.	"Skit #1 "The Copycat"" (featuring B.G. Duke and Scoopastar)		1:12
11.	"Ya'll"	Willo	4:29
12.	"Dirty Souf" (featuring Yung Redd and H.A.W.K.)	Willo	4:39
13.	"My Dogz" (featuring Scoopastar, Will-Lean, B.G. Duke and Taz)	J.P. Nitty	5:16
14.	"Cut 4 U" (featuring Ron Wilson)	Willo	4:01
15.	"The Biz" (featuring Hump)	Todd	3:34
16.	"Skit #2 "Purple Drank""		0:24
17.	"Candycars" (featuring Chris Ward, Lil' Key, B.G. Duke, Will-Lean, C-Note, Big Shasta and Ron Wilson)	J.P. Nitty	4:44
18.	"Green Rectanglez" (featuring Scoopastar)	Willo	4:07
19.	"Skit #3 "The Dentist""		1:45
20.	"I Can Do Dat"	Willo	3:38
21.	"Soufside Still Holdin' (Radio) (Screwed)" (featuring Big T)		5:31
22.	"Lil' Flip" (Screwed)		4:26
23.	"Soufside Still Holdin' (Street)" (featuring Big T and S.U.C.)		9:25
24.	"Da Freestyle King" (Screwed)		5:43
Total length:			2:03:34

== Charts ==
Chart (2000)	Peak position
US Top R&B/Hip-Hop Albums (Billboard)	67
US Independent Albums (Billboard)	34
US Heatseekers Albums (Billboard)	36
