= Miri Ben-Ari =

Israeli female violinist

Miri Ben-Ari מירי בן-ארי
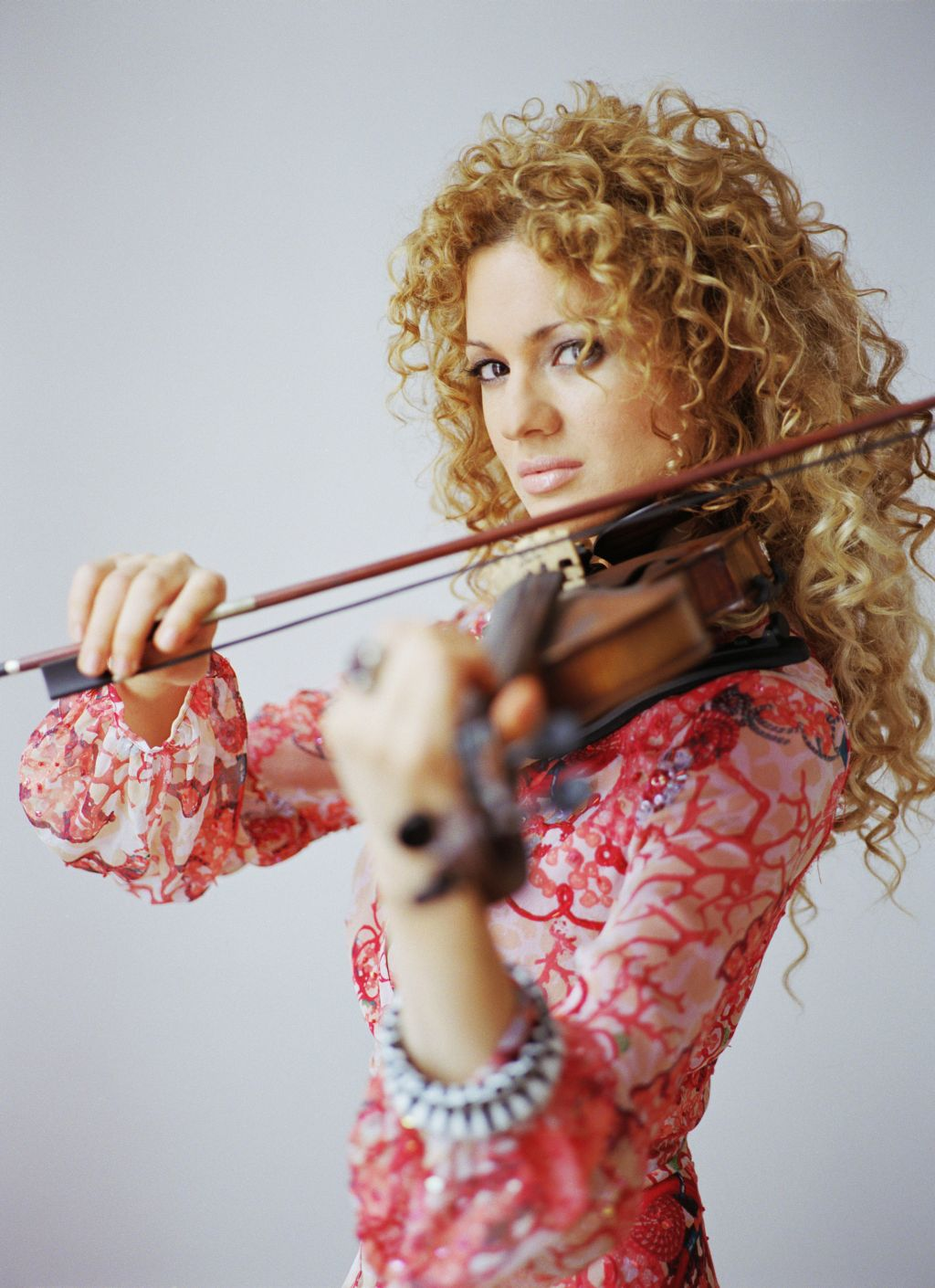
- Ben-Ari in 2011

Background information
- Also known as: United Nations Goodwill Ambassador of Music; The Hip Hop Violinist
- Born: 4 December 1978 (age 47); Tel Aviv District, Israel
- Origin: Fort Lee, New Jersey, U.S.
- Genres: Hip hop; R&B
- Occupations: Violinist; record producer; composer; Music-Tech entrepreneur
- Instrument: Violin
- Years active: 1999–present
- Labels: Universal; Mirimode Productions
- Children: 1
- Website: Official website

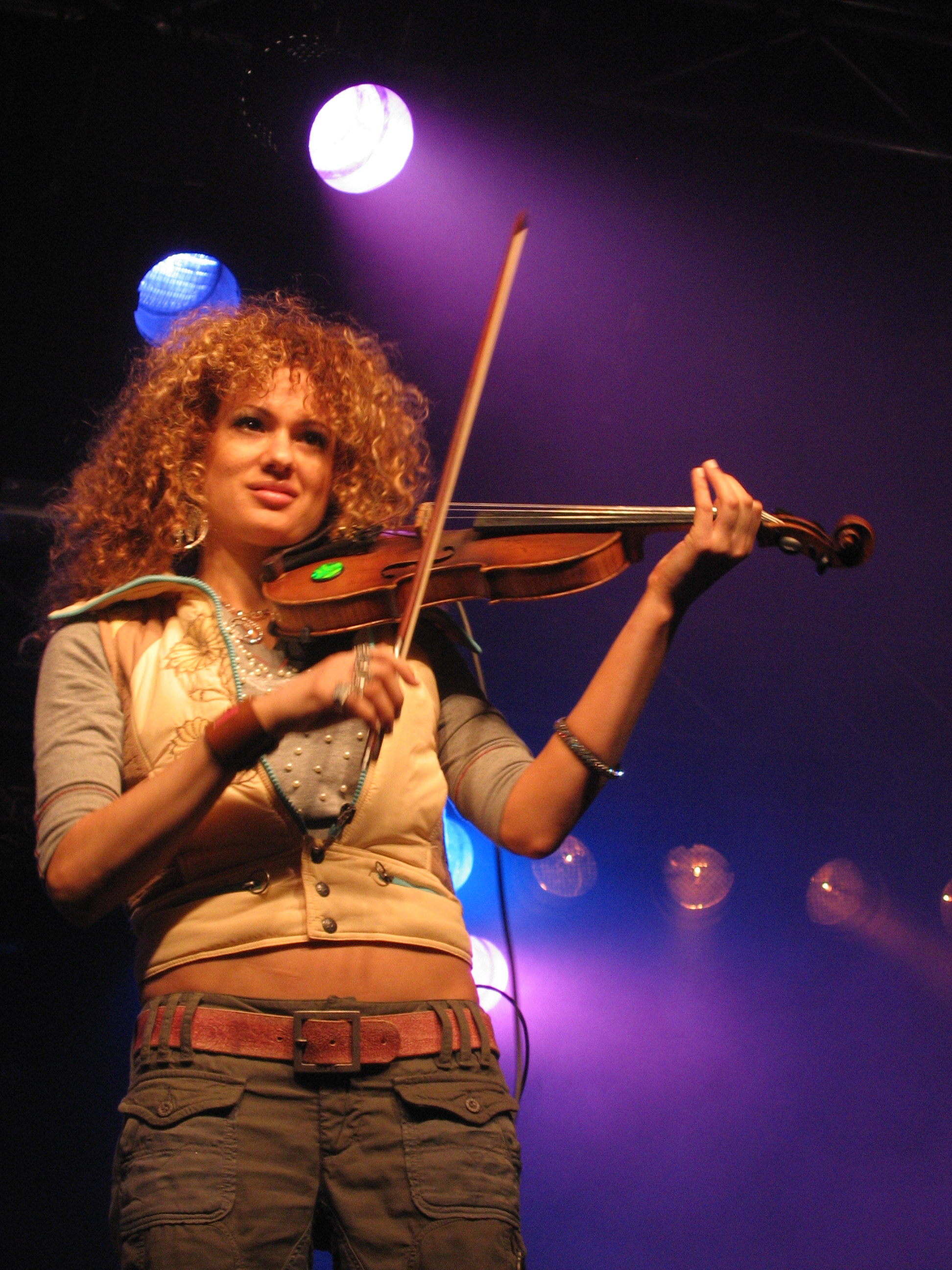
Ben-Ari performing in 2005

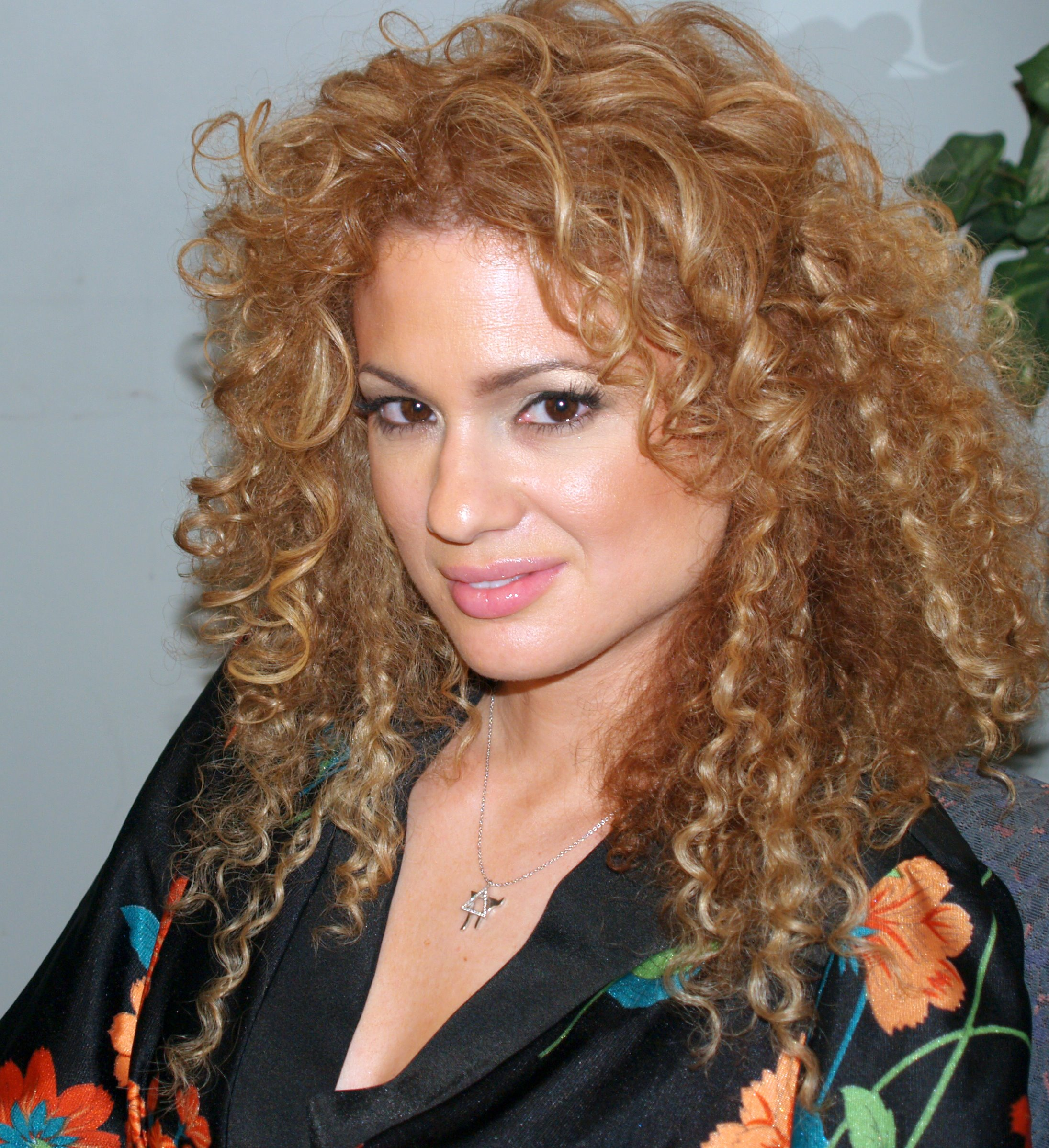
Ben-Ari in 2004

Miri Ben-Ari (Hebrew: מירי בן-ארי; born 4 December 1978) is an Israeli–American violinist, record producer, music-tech entrepreneur, and humanitarian. As of 2025, she is the first and only violinist to win a Grammy in the Hip Hop category, known as "the hip-hop violinist".

== Life and career ==
Ben-Ari was born and raised in Tel Aviv District, Israel. She grew up playing classical music; she started training at age 5 and at age 12, she was presented with a violin by Isaac Stern. During her mandatory military service, she served playing for the Israel Defense Forces Orchestra (IDF's Orchestra). During her stint in the Israeli military, she heard an album by Charlie Parker and immediately fell in love with jazz; she later said "My soul was sold." Following her service, she moved from Israel to New York in hopes of using her classical training on stage and attended the Jazz department at The New School, but was expelled after two semesters due to poor attendance caused by Ben-Ari playing gigs to pay the rent.

She released her first solo CD, Sahara, in 1999.

Her persistence earned her an appearance on BET's 106 & Park; the viewer response netted her a return visit a few weeks later. Her performances caught the eye of Jay-Z, who invited her to play as one of the headliners of New York radio station Hot 97's annual Summer Jam concert in 2001, where she netted a standing ovation. Around the same time, a mutual friend introduced Ben-Ari to Wyclef Jean, who invited her to perform with him at his Carnegie Hall show, the first by a hip-hop artist at the venue.

In 2003, she released her second CD Temple of Beautiful, and followed that up with a live CD the following year entitled Live at the Blue Note.

She won a Grammy Award for Best Rap Song in 2005 as one of the co-writers of Kanye West's "Jesus Walks". In 2005, Universal Music Group released her fourth CD and first to focus on hip-hop style, entitled The Hip-Hop Violinist. As part of the promotion for it, she was part of Reebok's "I Am What I Am" global advertising campaign; Reebok was also part of the video for the first single from the CD, "We Gonna Win".

In 2006, she co-founded Gedenk (Yiddish for "remember"), an organization dedicated to promoting education about the Holocaust in the United States. That year she collaborated with the Bachata band Aventura (band) on the song José, released on Kings of Bachata: Sold Out at Madison Square Garden.

In 2007, she received the International Jewish Woman To Watch of 2007 Award and in 2008 she received the "2008 Israel Film Festival Visionary Award," "The Jewish Federation" award and "the American Society for Yad Vashem" Award.

In 2009, she released Symphony of Brotherhood, an instrumental track featuring Martin Luther King Jr.'s "I Have a Dream" speech. In part due to the song, she received the first Martin Luther King Jr. Israeli Award in January 2008 at a ceremony hosted by the President of Israel, Shimon Peres.

In March 2011, Ben-Ari was invited to the White House by Michelle Obama as part of a Women's History Month celebration, to perform and to be honored as a "remarkable Woman". In July 2011 she performed at the 2011 Miss Universe China pageant. and in October 2011 she performed at the Martin Luther King Jr. Presidential memorial dedication in Washington, DC.

In 2011, she was named by Ynet as one of the 10 most influential Israelis in America.

In 2012, Ben-Ari was invited to perform for U.S. President Barack Obama.

In 2013, she was appointed as "Goodwill Ambassador of Music" at the United Nations Association-Brazil.

In 2013, she was featured in the trance song Intense by DJ and producer Armin Van Buuren. The track was the title track of Van Buuren's album Intense and was chosen as the "Tune of the Year" of 2013 by A State Of Trance

Miri Ben-Ari is signed with the Harman Kardon brand as a Beautiful Sound artist to be featured globally in advertisements and in special appearances as an ambassador for the Harman Kardon "Beautiful Sound" brand campaign.

In 2014, she was honored with the "Aviv Award" by The America-Israel Cultural Foundation 75th Anniversary Gala at Lincoln Center for the Performing Arts, hosted by Itzhak Perlman and introduced by Jersey City Mayor Steven Fulop and CEO of Harman International Dinesh Paliwal. Ben-Ari was a special guest feature with Arianna Huffingtons THIRD METRIC LIVE and Armin Van Buuren ARMIN ONLY-INTENSE world tour. She became a featured blogger for the Huffington and was chosen by top Israeli news media Mako and Ynet as one of the top ten most influential Israelis now living in the United States.

Following the great success of its first year, Ben-Ari continues to promote "The Gedenk Award For Tolerance" campaign in 2015, now in its second year partnership with Alliance for Young Artists & Writers sponsored by Ben-Ari's non-profit organization GEDENK. Ben-Ari received the first-ever "Girl Up Advocate Award" to celebrate international Women's Day from the United Nations Foundation and is the recipient of the 2015 Ellis Island Medal of Honor.

A longtime resident of Bergen County, New Jersey, Ben-Ari moved from Edgewater to Fort Lee in 2016.

In 2018, she released the single "Quiet Storm". Ben-Ari was featured by Tanzanian recording artist Diamond Platnumz on the song "Baila". The song won in 2019 "Best Collaboration Award" by African Entertainment Awards USA.

In 2019, Ben-Ari produced and released a single "Watcha Gonna Do" featuring her son Dorel. That year she started collaborating with Nigerian producer Young D. "The Beat Boss" for the project "Afrostringz'. The duo released a holiday song "Afro Christmas". In 2020 Ben-Ari and her music partner Young D. launched the music group "Afrostringz" with a first single and music video "She Don't Know". Ben-Ari was appointed by NJ Governor Phil Murphy as a member of the New Jersey-Israel commission. In 2021 Ben-Ari became a TED speaker delivering TED talks dedicated to creativity and entrepreneurship "How to make the violin cool" and harmony & diversity "4 ways to strive with harmony]".

In 2022, Ben-Ari released the song "Symphony of Brotherhood Rise" with superstar rapper Flo Rida and Erik E. "Smooth" Hicks, featuring Dr. Martin King Jr with the iconic speech "I have a dream", a special release for Dr. Martin Luther King Day. The song entered the official Spotify MLK playlist.

In 2023, Miri Ben-Ari produced a special concert for Black History Month, hosted by the New Jersey-Israel Commission to Governor Phil Murphy and COGIC (Church of God in Christ) and attended by government officials and community leaders, including NJ Secretary of State Tahesha Way, former U.S. Senator-NJ Governor Jon Corzine, Newark Mayor Ras Baraka, Rabbis, and Bishops.

Ben-Ari was invited as the headline performer at The "110 First Lady's Luncheon," honoring The First Lady Jill Biden.

In 2024, Miri Ben-Ari launched a music education program for high school students in New York called Symphony of Brotherhood, opening Black History Month attended by NYC Mayor Eric Adams. In 2025, she expanded the program to New Jersey, launching it in partnership with the City of Newark Board of Education and NJ Lieutenant Governor Tahesha Way to mark the opening of Black History Month. In 2024 Ben-Ari was honored by the Anti-Defamation League with the "Making a Difference" award. Miri Ben-Ari co-founded MusicX and serves as its CEO. MusicX is a music technology company and the parent company of Boombap.

In 2025, Miri Ben-Ari released the Amapiano song "Finally" with Tanzanian artist Harmonize. On June 22, 2025, Miri Ben-Ari made history by becoming the first recording artist to headline the Game 7 2025 NBA Finals halftime performance between the Oklahoma City Thunder and the Indiana Pacers. Miri Ben-Ari won the Music Tech Innovation Award by the World Leaders in Data and AI.

In 2026, Ben-Ari served as the Music Director and featured performer for the opening segment of the 79th Cannes Film Festival. She became the first music recording artist to be featured in the opening segment of the opening ceremony and performed the 2026 Cannes Film Festival alongside Eye Haïdara.

== Discography ==
=== Albums ===
- 1999: Sahara
- 2000: Song of the Promised Land
- 2003: Temple of Beautiful
- 2004: Live at the Blue Note
- 2005: The Hip-Hop Violinist

=== Singles ===
Year	Single	Chart positions				Album
Year	Single	U.S. Hot 100	U.S. R&B	U.S. R&B Singles Sales	U.S. Singles Sales	Album
2005	"Run This City" (Clinton Sparks feat. P. Diddy & Miri Ben-Ari)	—	107	—	—	The Pulling Strings Mixtape
2005	"Sunshine to the Rain" (feat. Scarface and Anthony Hamilton)	—	39	—	—	The Hip-Hop Violinist
2005	"We Gonna Win" (feat. Styles P)	—	—	—	—	The Hip-Hop Violinist
2006	"Symphony of Brotherhood"	—	77	2	15	—

=== Featured on ===
- Aventura - José (K.O.B. Live) 2006
- Akon - Miss Melody (Trouble) 2004 and (The Hip-Hop Violinist) 2005

*Wyclef Jean Feat. M.O.P. - Masquerade (Masquerade) 2002

- Alicia Keys - Fallin' (Songs in A Minor) 2001
- Twista - Overnight Celebrity (Kamikaze) 2004
- Kanye West - We Don't Care, Graduation Day, Jesus Walks, The New Workout Plan, Breathe In Breathe Out, Two Words (The College Dropout) 2004
- Kanye West - Late (bonus track) (Late Registration) 2005
- Brandy - Talk About Our Love (Afrodisiac) 2004
- Brandy - Where You Wanna Be (feat. T.I.) (Afrodisiac) 2004
- Brandy, Mary J. Blige, Mariah Carey, Missy Elliott, Eve, Ashanti, Wyclef Jean, Monica, Queen Latifah, Jadakiss, Nas, Usher, Musiq, Mýa, Fabolous, Solange, Akon, Jamie Foxx, Babyface - Wake Up Everybody (Wake Up Everybody) 2004
- DJ Logic - "Soul Kissing" (The Anomaly) 2001
- John Legend - Live It Up (Get Lifted) 2004
- Janet Jackson - I Want You (Damita Jo) 2004
- Lil' Mo - Yeah Yeah Yeah (Syndicated: The Lil' Mo Hour) 2006
- Ted Nash - Rhyme & Reason (Arabesque, 1999), Sidewalk Meeting (Arabesque, 2001)
- Santi Debriano - ( Circle Chant (album) ) 1999
- Santi Debriano - Artistic License (Savant, 2001)
- Subliminal - Klassit ve'Parsi (Classy & Persian) (Bediuk Kshe'Chashavtem She'Hakol Nigmar (Just When You Thought It Was All Over)) 2006
- Don Omar - Intro - Predica (King Of Kings) 2006
- Deemi - Soundtrack of My Life 2007
- Tarkan - Who's Gonna Love You Now? (Come Closer (re-release) ) (2008)
- Thalía - ¿A quién le importa?
- Styles P - We Gonna Win
- Zion & Lennox feat. Fatman Scoop & Pitbull - ¿Dónde Están las Mamis? (Yo Voy)/Jump & Spread Out [Remix] (Motivando A La Yal: Special Edition/The Hip-Hop Violinist)
- Erykah Badu - My Life
- T-Pain - Kings
- Savage Feat. Akon - Moonshine
- Wu-Tang Clan - Reunited
- Consequence - Waiting On You
- Armin van Buuren - Intense
- Sunnery James & Ryan Marciano - One Life
- Diamond Platnumz - Baila - song No. 8 from the album "A Boy from Tandale", released on 14 March in Tanzania.
- Flo Rida - Symphony of Brotherhood Rise ft Dr. Martin Luther King
- Harmonize (musician) - Finally released in 2025 in Tanzania.

=== Miscellaneous, unreleased and remixes ===
- Maroon 5 - "This Love (remix) with Kanye West"
- Britney Spears - "Me Against the Music (remix)"
- Consequence - Waiting on you

== Awards and nominations ==
=== Grammy Awards ===
Year	Award	Nominated work	Result	Ref.
2005	Grammy Award for Song of the Year	"Jesus Walks"	Nominated	
2005	Grammy Award for Best Rap Song	"Jesus Walks"	Won	
