= Respect Me (Lil' Flip album) =

Studio album by Lil' Flip
- Released: September 29, 2009
- Recorded: 2008–2009
- Genre: Hip hop, Southern hip hop
- Label: Clover G; High Powered; E1
- Producer: Lil' Flip, Tommy Granville Jr., Big Tyme, Young Sears, Joe Trax, JStarz

Lil' Flip chronology
I Need Mine (2007)	Respect Me (2009)	Underground Legend 2 (2009)

Respect Me is the second independent album and fifth overall studio album by rapper Lil' Flip. This album is described by Lil' Flip as "the album before the album." Guest appearances for the album include Eden, Kokane, Jay Townsend, Ceven & Bobby Moon. A video for "Da #1 Fly Boy" was released on October 30, 2009.

== Track listing ==
No.	Title	Producer(s)	Length
1.	"Respect Me" (featuring Eden)	Sean Thomas	3:22
2.	"Shawty Wanna Thug" (featuring Kokane)	Ian De Lile & John Silva	3:25
3.	"Swangaz on Bentleys"	Sean Thomas	2:46
4.	"Da #1 Fly Boy" (featuring Jay Townsend)	John Silva	3:43
5.	"2 Steppin'" (featuring Jay Townsend)	John Silva	3:27
6.	"I'm Still On"	Cozmo	3:38
7.	"I Got 2 Be" (featuring Jay Townsend)	Phillip Moore	4:22
8.	"Real Life"	Str8 Drop	3:16
9.	"I'm Back" (featuring Jay Townsend)	John Silva	3:58
10.	"On My Grind"	Sean Thomas	2:30
11.	"D-Boyz" (featuring C-Bo)	Kuddie Mac & Paul Silva	2:49
12.	"Murdera's"	Sean Thomas	3:10
13.	"Swagga Jackin'" (featuring Ceven)	John Silva	3:14
14.	"Let Me Do Me"	Str8 Drop	3:30
15.	"Supafly (Hands Up High)" (featuring Bobby Moon)	JStarz	2:43
16.	"Stop Lyin'"	---	4:19
