= Undaground Legend =

Studio album by Lil' Flip
- Released: August 27, 2002
- Recorded: 2001–2002
- Studios: Sucka Free Records Studio (Houston, TX); SouthSide Studio (Houston, TX)
- Genres: Hip hop, southern hip hop
- Length: 1:08:58
- Labels: Sucka Free; Loud; Columbia
- Producers: Bigg Tyme; Chop Shop Productions; David Banner; Joe Traxx; Ke'Noe; Kojak; Lil' Flip; Mr. Mixx; Slugger; Tommy Granville Jr.; Young Sears

Lil' Flip chronology
The Leprechaun (2000)	Undaground Legend (2002)	U Gotta Feel Me (2004)

Singles from Undaground Legend
- 1. "U See It" Released: 2002; 2. "The Way We Ball" Released: 2002

Professional ratings
Review scores
Source	Rating
AllMusic	3/5 stars
RapReviews	7.5/10

Undaground Legend is the second solo studio album by American rapper Lil' Flip. It was released on August 27, 2002, through Sucka Free/Loud/Columbia Records. Recording sessions took place at Sucka Free Records Studio and SouthSide Studio in Houston. Production was handled by Young Sears, Ke'Noe, Bigg Tyme, Tommy Granville Jr, Chop Shop Productions, David Banner, Joe Traxx, Kojak, Mr. Mixx, Slugger, and Lil' Flip himself, who also served as executive producer together with Hump. It features guest appearances from Lil' Ron, Big T, Bizzy Bone, David Banner, Seville, Yung Redd, Big Shasta, Chamillionaire, C-Note, Juvenile and Skip.

The album debuted at number 12 on the Billboard 200 and number 4 on the Top R&B/Hip-Hop Albums with 70,000 copies sold in the first week released in the United States. It was certified Platinum by the Recording Industry Association of America on December 3, 2002, for selling 1,000,000 copies in the US alone. Its single "The Way We Ball" reached only No. 69 on the US Hot R&B/Hip-Hop Songs chart. A sequel to the album, Underground Legend Part 2, was released in 2009 via Clover G Records.

== Track listing ==
No.	Title	Writer(s)	Producer(s)	Length
1.	"What I Been Through" (featuring Yung Redd, Lil' Ron and Big T)	Wesley Eric Weston; Chris Gallien; Ronald Wayne Thomas	Lil' Flip; Tommy Granville Jr.	4:29
2.	"U See It" (featuring Chamillionaire)	Weston; Hakeem Seriki	Lil' Flip; Young Sears	4:20
3.	"8 Rulez" (featuring Big Shasta)	Weston	Lil' Flip; Ke'Noe	3:55
4.	"I Shoulda Listened" (featuring Seville)	Weston	Lil' Flip; Bigg Tyme	3:34
5.	"7-1-3"	Weston; Gallien	Lil' Flip; Mr. Mixx	4:00
6.	"The Way We Ball"	Weston	Lil' Flip; Kojack; Young Sears	4:43
7.	"Get Crunk" (featuring Lil' Ron, Yung Redd and David Banner)	Weston; Thomas; Gallien; Lavell Crump	Lil' Flip; Young Sears	5:08
8.	"Haters Still Mad" (featuring Lil' Ron and Big T)	Weston; Thomas	Lil' Flip; Ke'Noe	3:14
9.	"We Ain't Scared" (featuring Bizzy Bone)	Weston; Bryon McCane	Lil' Flip; Ke'Noe	5:14
10.	"Make Mama Proud"	Weston	Lil' Flip; Tommy Granville Jr.	3:06
11.	"I Can Do Dat (Remix)" (featuring Juvenile and Skip)	Weston	Lil' Flip; Bigg Tyme	4:01
12.	"Tonight" (featuring Seville)	Weston; J. Jackson; C. Bishop; Ernie Isley; Marvin Isley; O'Kelly Isley Jr.; Ronald Isley; Rudolph Isley; Chris Jasper	Lil' Flip; Slugger	4:21
13.	"What Y'all Wanna Do" (featuring David Banner and C-Note)	Weston; Crump; Courtney Smith	Lil' Flip; David Banner	4:07
14.	"It's a Fact"	Weston	Lil' Flip; Young Sears	4:28
15.	"R.I.P. Screw" (featuring Bizzy Bone)	Weston; McCane; Maurice Jordan	Lil' Flip; Joe Traxx	5:13
16.	"Forget the Fame"	Weston	Lil' Flip; Chop Shop Productions	5:05
Total length:				1:08:58

Bonus CD
No.	Title	Producer(s)	Length
17.	"The Way We Ball (Remix)" (featuring Lil' Ron and Yung Redd)	Lil' Flip; Kojack; Young Sears	4:44
18.	"The Way We Ball (Screwed & Chopped)"	Lil' Flip; Kojack; Young Sears	5:39
19.	"Da Roof"		2:45
20.	"Texas Boyz (Screwed & Chopped)" (featuring Yung Redd)		4:34
21.	"U See It (Screwed & Chopped)" (featuring Chamillionaire)	Lil' Flip; Young Sears	5:19
22.	"Look at Me Now"		4:43
23.	"Haters Still Mad (Screwed & Chopped)" (featuring Big T and Lil' Ron)	Lil' Flip; Ke'Noe	3:50

Sample credits

- Track 12 contains a portion of the composition "I Need Your Body" written by The Isley Brothers.

== Personnel ==
- Wesley "Lil' Flip" Weston – vocals, producer, executive producer
- Christopher "Yung Redd" Gallien – vocals (tracks: 1, 7)
- Ronald "Lil' Ron" Thomas – vocals (tracks: 1, 7, 8)
- Terence "Big T" Prejean – vocals (tracks: 1, 8)
- Hakeem "Chamillionaire" Seriki – vocals (track 2)
- Shasta B. Moore – vocals (track 3)
- Seville – vocals (tracks: 4, 12)
- Lavell "David Banner" Crump – vocals (tracks: 7, 13), producer (track 13)
- Bryon "Bizzy Bone" McCane – vocals (tracks: 9, 15)
- Terius "Juvenile" Gray – vocals (track 11)
- Clifford "Skip" Nicholas – vocals (track 11)
- Courtney "C-Note" Smith – vocals (track 13)
- Tommy Lee Granville Jr. – producer (tracks: 1, 10), recording, mixing, mastering
- Anthony Raydale Sears – producer (tracks: 2, 6, 7, 14)
- Maurice "Ke'Noe" Jordan – producer (tracks: 3, 8, 9)
- Randy "Bigg Tyme" Jefferson – producer (tracks: 4, 11)
- David "Mr. Mixx" Hobbs – producer (track 5)
- Kojack – producer (track 6)
- Slugger – producer (track 12)
- Joseph "Joe Traxx" Howard Jr. – producer (track 15)
- Chop Shop Productions – producer (track 16)
- Mike "M.J." Johnson – recording, mixing
- Estell D. "Hump" Hobbs – executive producer
- Julian Alexander – art direction
- Daniel Hastings – photography

== Charts ==
=== Weekly charts ===
Chart (2002)	Peak position
US Billboard 200	12
US Top R&B/Hip-Hop Albums (Billboard)	4

=== Year-end charts ===
Chart (2002)	Position
US Top R&B/Hip-Hop Albums (Billboard)	65
Chart (2003)	Position
US Top R&B/Hip-Hop Albums (Billboard)	85

== Certifications ==
Region	Certification	Certified units/sales
United States (RIAA)	Platinum	1,000,000^{^}
^{^} Shipments figures based on certification alone.
