= I Need Mine =

Studio album by Lil' Flip
- Released: March 27, 2007
- Recorded: 2005–2007
- Genre: Hip-hop
- Length: 2:20:23
- Labels: Clover G; Asylum; Warner Bros.
- Producers: Attractive Productions; Carnival Beats; DJ Paul; DJ Squeeky; Falling Down; Fyngermade; Juicy J; Lil' Flip; Mannie Fresh; Mel Beatz; Nitti; Preston Flowers; Russell Rockwell; Salaam Remi; Scott Storch; The Synphony; Z-Ro

Lil' Flip chronology
| Connected (2006) | I Need Mine (2007) | Still Connected (2008) |

Alternate cover
- Original 2005 cover

Singles from I Need Mine $$
- 1. "What It Do" Released: October 11, 2005; 2. "Ghetto Mindstate (Can't Get Away)" Released: January 30, 2007

I Need Mine is the fourth solo album by the American rapper Lil' Flip. Originally set to be released on December 6, 2005, via Columbia/Sony Urban, it was released on March 27, 2007, through Asylum/Warner Bros. Records.

Production was handled by Attractive Productions, Carnival Beats, DJ Paul, DJ Squeeky, Falling Down, Fyngermade, Juicy J, Mannie Fresh, Mel Beatz, Nitti, Preston "Shorty P" Flowers, Russell Rockwell, Salaam Remi, Scott Storch, The Synphony, Z-Ro, and Lil' Flip himself.

It features guest appearances from Big Pokey, Big Shasta, Chamillionaire, C-Note, Collie Buddz, D-Red, Gudda Gudda, Kidd Kidd, Lyfe Jennings, Mannie Fresh, Mike Jones, MJG, Mýa, Nate Dogg, Rick Ross, Robin Andre, Supa Blanco, Three 6 Mafia, UGK, Yukmouth, Z-Ro and Viola Sykes.

The album debuted at number 15 on the US Billboard 200 chart with 43,000 copies sold in the first week released. It was supported with singles "What It Do", which peaked at No. 71 on the Hot R&B/Hip-Hop Songs, No. 67 on the R&B/Hip-Hop Airplay and No. 36 on the Mainstream R&B/Hip-Hop Airplay, and "Ghetto Mindstate (Can't Get Away)", which peaked at No. 77 on the Hot R&B/Hip-Hop Songs and No. 74 on the R&B/Hip-Hop Airplay.

== Critical reception ==
Professional ratings
Review scores
| Source | Rating |
|---|---|
| AllMusic | 3.5/5 stars |
| Blender | 3/5 stars |
| HipHopDX | 2.5/5 |
| RapReviews | 7.5/10 |
| Rolling Stone | 3/5 stars |
| Spin | 2/5 stars |
| XXL | 3/5 (L) |

I Need Mine was met with generally favourable reviews from music critics.

Pedro Hernandez of RapReviews praised the album for scaling back on the humour to allow for diverse topics and sharp production, calling it "Lil' Flip's best album to date and yet it isn't. Even with the scarcity of humor on the album, if you put all the best songs on the double disc together you would have Flip's best album". AllMusic's David Jeffries complained about the project's length, saying "listening to the album in one sitting becomes a near impossible task", and also stated: "the problem Lil' Flip was faced with was whether he should whittle this album down to a stunning one-disc classic and sacrifice some truly B+ music".

Andrew Beaujon of Blender felt that a discord was found between the production and Flip's lyrics, saying that "The beats are often dazzling, the rhymes less so. His disses in particular need a little work". In his brief review for Rolling Stone, music editor Christian Hoard gave the album 3 out of possible five stars, saying "his deep-country drawl and casual braggadocio make for Southern rap that's hard not to like on tunes such as "Busta Clip" and the languorous "The Souf". Brian Miller of XXL wrote: "although tweaked, I Need Mine still includes some of the questionable material from its previous incarnation", and concluded with "buried among the upgraded tracks, the sore thumbs are not as prominent as before, but they hold Flip back from fully regaining his underground-legend status". HipHopDX reviewer wrote: "with versatility being his key selling point, he does hit many different angles. But while excelling on a few cuts, he falls hopelessly flat on more. This is unfortunate because the falls overshadow his highpoints throughout [the album]".

== Track listing ==
Disc 1
| No. | Title | Writer(s) | Producer(s) | Length |
|---|---|---|---|---|
| 1. | "Intro" | | | 0:59 |
| 2. | "I Get Money" (featuring Rick Ross) | Wesley Weston; William Roberts; Sandy Lal; Carlos Hassan | The Synphony | 3:41 |
| 3. | "Fly Boy" | Weston; Preston Flowers | Lil' Flip; Shorty P | 3:58 |
| 4. | "Ghetto Mindstate (Can't Get Away)" (featuring Lyfe Jennings) | Weston; Chester Jermaine Jennings; Lal; Hassan | The Synphony | 3:54 |
| 5. | "Bustaclip" | Weston; Christopher Bernard | Attractive Productions | 4:03 |
| 6. | "Playa 4 Life" (featuring Chamillionaire) | Weston; Hakeem Seriki; Lal; Hassan | The Synphony | 4:01 |
| 7. | "Starched & Cleaned" (featuring Big Pokey and Lil' Keke) | Weston; Milton Powell; Marcus Edwards; Salih Williams | Carnival Beats | 4:41 |
| 8. | "Flippin'" (featuring Mýa) | Weston; Lal; Hassan; David Rudden; David Murdoch; Douglas Muirden; Willie Gardner; Paul Wishart; Brian McGee | The Synphony | 3:47 |
| 9. | "Addicted (Mary Jane)" | Weston; Lal; Hassan | The Synphony | 4:22 |
| 10. | "White Cup" (featuring Mike Jones) | Weston; Mike Jones; Flowers | Lil' Flip; Shorty P | 3:43 |
| 11. | "Find My Way" (featuring Robin Andre) | Weston; Derrick Spearman | Russell Rockwell; The Synphony | 4:48 |
| 12. | "Single Mother" (featuring Viola Sykes) | Weston; Lal; Hassan | The Synphony | 3:57 |
| 13. | "Say It to My Face" (featuring Z-Ro) | Weston; Joseph McVey | Z-Ro | 3:45 |
| 14. | "Can't U Tell" (featuring MJG, Supa Blanco and Gudda Gudda) | Weston | DJ Squeeky | 5:08 |
| 15. | "I Just Wanna Tell U" | Weston; Paul Beauregard; Jordan Houston; Willie Hutchinson | DJ Paul; Juicy J | 2:31 |
| 16. | "Block Money" | Weston; Bernard | Attractive Productions | 2:42 |
| 17. | "Sorry Lil' Mama" (featuring Z-Ro and Nutt) | Weston; McVey; Curtis Stewart; Lal; Hassan | The Synphony; Glen Gray (co.) | 3:57 |
| 18. | "I'm a Baller (Flip My Chips)" | Weston; Lal; Hassan | The Synphony; Falling Down | 3:22 |
| 19. | "Take You There" (featuring Nate Dogg) | Weston; Nathaniel Hale; Lal; Hassan | The Synphony | 4:05 |
| 20. | "Hall of Fame Graveyard" | Weston; Lal; Hassan | The Synphony | 3:33 |

Disc 2
| No. | Title | Writer(s) | Producer(s) | Length |
|---|---|---|---|---|
| 21. | "We Go Make It Out Da Hood" (featuring Big Shasta) | Weston; Chadron Moore | Nitti | 3:50 |
| 22. | "Cruise Control" | Weston; Bernard | Attractive Productions | 3:25 |
| 23. | "Hustle" | Weston; Bernard | Attractive Productions | 3:52 |
| 24. | "Real Hip Hop" | Weston | Mel Beatz | 2:51 |
| 25. | "Stay Ballin'" (featuring Yukmouth and Big Shasta) | Weston; Jerold D. Ellis; Flowers | Lil' Flip; Shorty P | 4:37 |
| 26. | "Get It Crunk" | Weston; Spearman | Russell Rockwell | 4:08 |
| 27. | "Tell Me" (featuring Collie Buddz) | Weston; Colin Harper; Scott Storch | Scott Storch | 3:48 |
| 28. | "3, 2, 1 Go" (featuring Three 6 Mafia) | Weston; Beauregard; Houston | DJ Paul; Juicy J | 4:24 |
| 29. | "Make It Shake" | Weston; Flowers | Lil' Flip; Shorty P | 3:44 |
| 30. | "Pimp Juju" (Skit) | Weston | | 0:57 |
| 31. | "You'z a Trick" | Weston; Salaam Gibbs; Lal; Hassan; Hernst Bellevue | Salaam Remi; StayBent Krunk-a-Delic | 4:08 |
| 32. | "The Souf" (featuring C-Note, D-Red and Big Shasta) | Weston; Courtney Smith; Brian Fields | Fyngermade | 5:04 |
| 33. | "Family Tradition" | Weston | Z-Ro | 4:14 |
| 34. | "What It Do" (featuring Mannie Fresh) | Weston; Byron Thomas | Mannie Fresh | 4:01 |
| 35. | "Warrior" | Weston; Flowers | Lil' Flip; Shorty P | 3:36 |
| 36. | "Fly Boy (Remix)" (featuring Mike Jones) | Weston; Flowers | Lil' Flip; Shorty P | 3:58 |
| 37. | "You'z a Trick (Remix)" (featuring UGK) | Weston; Gibbs; Lal; Hassan; Bellevue | Salaam Remi | 4:49 |
| Total length: | | | | 2:20:23 |

Bonus tracks
| No. | Title | Writer(s) | Producer(s) | Length |
|---|---|---|---|---|
| 38. | "Give Me a Beat" | Weston | Mel Beatz | 3:11 |
| 39. | "After Party" | Weston | The Synphony; Glen Gray (co.) | 3:36 |

Sample credits

- Track 8 contains samples from the composition "Ecstacy" as performed by Endgames.
- Track 15 contains samples from the composition "Overture of Foxy Brown" as performed by Willie Hutch.

== Charts ==
| Chart (2007) | Peak position |
|---|---|
| US Billboard 200 | 15 |
| US Top R&B/Hip-Hop Albums (Billboard) | 5 |
| US Top Rap Albums (Billboard) | 4 |
| US Indie Store Album Sales (Billboard) | 10 |
