= Certified (Lil' Flip and Gudda Gudda album) =

Studio album by Lil' Flip and Gudda Gudda
- Released: May 26, 2009
- Recorded: 2008–2009
- Genre: Hip-hop, Southern hip-hop
- Label: Real Talk Entertainment
- Producer: Lil' Flip, Big Hollis, Vince V., Cozmo, Preach

Professional ratings
Review scores
Source	Rating
Allmusic	3.5/5 stars

Certified is a collaborative album by rappers Lil' Flip and Gudda Gudda of Young Money Entertainment.

== Track listing ==
No.	Title	Length
1.	"#1 Fly Boy" (Lil Flip)	1:12
2.	"Bosses Make It Rain" (Lil Flip & Gudda Gudda)	5:13
3.	"Roll It"	0:15
4.	"Smoke and Ride" (Lil Flip & Gudda Gudda)	4:38
5.	"She So Fly" (Lil Flip)	3:26
6.	"I Love Cali" (Lil Flip & Gudda Gudda)	3:41
7.	"Down South Legends" (Lil Flip & Gudda Gudda)	4:31
8.	"Me and U Baby" (Lil Flip & Gudda Gudda)	3:44
9.	"Ether"	0:11
10.	"I Keep It Street All Day" (Lil Flip & Gudda Gudda)	4:48
11.	"Certified" (Lil Flip & Gudda Gudda)	4:10
12.	"If U Trappin" (Lil Flip & Gudda Gudda)	5:51
13.	"G Tales" (Lil Flip)	5:46
14.	"The Best" (Lil Flip)	2:49
