= Lil' Flip =

American rapper (born 1981)

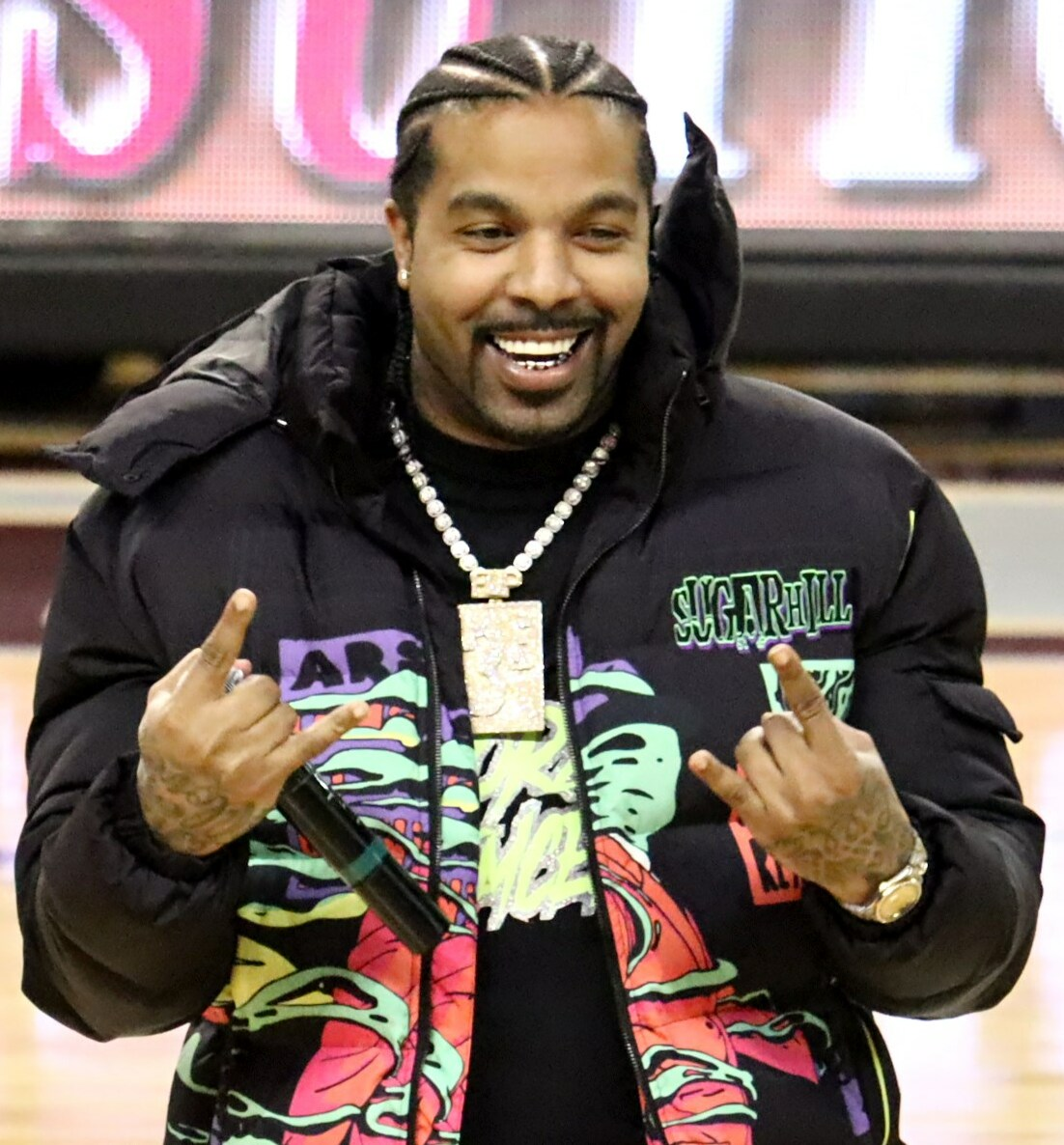
- Lil' Flip performing in 2023

Background information
- Born: Wesley Eric Weston Jr. March 3, 1981 (age 45); Cloverland, Houston, Texas, U.S.
- Genre: Hip hop
- Occupations: Rapper; songwriter; record producer; record executive
- Years active: 1999–present
- Labels: Clover G; EMPIRE; SoSouth; Fontana; Loud; Columbia; Sony Urban; Asylum; Warner Bros.; Sucka Free
- Formerly of: Screwed Up Click

Wesley Eric Weston Jr. (born March 3, 1981), better known by his stage name Lil' Flip, is an American rapper. Raised in Houston, Texas, he began his musical career as a freestyle and battle rapper before signing with the local record label Sucka Free Records in 1999. Three years later, he secured a joint venture with Columbia Records, achieving mainstream recognition for his 2004 singles "Game Over" and "Sunshine", which peaked at numbers 15 and two on the Billboard Hot 100, respectively.

== Musical career ==
=== 1999–2003: The Leprechaun and Undaground Legend ===
In 1999, Lil' Flip secured his first recording contract with the independent Houston, Texas label Sucka Free. On 18 July 2000, he released his debut album, The Leprechaun, which garnered the attention of DJ Screw, the influential founder of the Screwed Up Click. Impressed by his skills, DJ Screw invited Lil' Flip to join the group and bestowed upon him the title of "The Freestyle King".

In 2002, Columbia Records extended a joint venture recording and distribution deal to Flip and Sucka Free. Reflecting on the partnership, Flip stated:

"We felt that they not only respected what we'd already accomplished on our own, but they also saw the big picture of what me as an artist, and Hump and I as Sucka Free's CEOs were all about."

On 27 August 2002, Lil' Flip released his second album, Undaground Legend, which achieved Platinum certification by December of the same year. The album featured the single "The Way We Ball". In 2003, he appeared on a number of notable tracks, including "Like a Pimp" by David Banner, "Tear It Up" by Yung Wun, and "Ridin' Spinners" by Three 6 Mafia. That same year, Flip also contributed a guest verse to Ludacris' track "Screwed Up" from the album Chicken-n-Beer.

=== 2004–05: U Gotta Feel Me ===
Despite rumors circulating that Lil Flip left Columbia, in February 2004, Lil Flip confirmed he was still signed to the label and in the process of releasing his second album through Columbia. That March, Lil' Flip released his third studio album, and first double-disc project, U Gotta Feel Me. Following a restructuring at his label, Columbia Records, he transitioned to Sony Urban Music, which he believed would provide stronger promotional support. The album's lead single, "Game Over (Flip)", was followed by "Sunshine", featuring Lea Sunshine. The album was certified Platinum by the Recording Industry Association of America (RIAA) in August 2004. That year, he also featured on the "Naughty Girl (Remix)" with Beyoncé and contributed to Chingy’s Powerballin' with a remix of the hit single "Balla Baby".

In addition to a remix of "Game Over (Flip)" featuring Young Buck and Bun B, Flip made a guest appearance on Nelly’s album Sweat. He also collaborated on the "Certified Gangstas (Remix)" alongside Jim Jones and The Game in 2004. The following year, Lil' Flip partnered with Z-Ro to release the collaborative album Kings of the South. In 2005, he featured on Chamillionaire’s debut single "Turn It Up" and appeared on the remix of Bun B's track "Draped Up". Additionally, he contributed to the 2 Fast 2 Furious soundtrack with the song "Rollin' on 20s", featuring fellow Houston rapper Yung Redd.

=== 2007–09: I Need Mine and Respect Me ===
On June 30, 2006, it was announced and confirmed that Lil' Flip parted ways with Sony Music and Columbia Records. About a month and a half later, Flip signed to Asylum and Warner Bros. His first release with Asylum and Warner Bros. was his third album and second double-disc project, I Need Mine, which was released on 27 March 2007. The album debuted at number 15 on the Billboard 200, selling 43,000 copies in its first week. Two singles were released from the album: "What It Do" and "Ghetto Mindstate (Can't Get Away)".

Lil' Flip's planned fifth studio album, Ahead of My Time, was originally slated for release as early as 2007 but faced numerous delays. In an effort to generate anticipation for the project, he released two promotional albums, or "album-before-the-album" releases, in 2009.

On 29 September 2009, he released his fifth album, Respect Me, as a promotional effort for Ahead of My Time. The album was distributed by High Powered Entertainment and E1 Music. Later that year, on 24 December 2009, Lil' Flip released his first fully independent album, Underground Legend 2, through his self-owned label Clover G Records. This release also served as a promotional tool for the upcoming Ahead of My Time.

=== 2010–present: More independent releases ===
On 6 July 2010, Lil' Flip released Ahead of My Time as his second independent album. Alongside this release, he debuted his artist Damienn Jones with the album Beauty and the Beast. Both projects were distributed independently through Lil' Flip's self-owned label, Clover G Records.

On 31 October 2013, Lil' Flip released his third independent album, The Black Dr. Kevorkian. Distributed once again by Clover G Records, the album sold over 10,000 copies in its first week.

On 17 March 2015, Lil' Flip released his sixth studio album, El Jefe, which was distributed by SoSouth Records. The album's lead single, "Game Over II", served as a sequel to his earlier hit single "Game Over (Flip)".

The second single from El Jefe was titled "In My Pimp C Voice", a tribute to the late rapper Pimp C. The third single, "Bestfriend", featured guest appearances by E.J. Carter and Rev City.

== Other ventures ==
=== Clover G Records ===
Clover G Records
- Founded: 2004
- Founder: Wesley "Lil' Flip" Weston Jr. (CEO and President)
- Status: Active
- Distributor: GT Digital / EMPIRE
- Genre: Hip-hop, pop, crunk, R&B
- Country of origin: United States
- Location: Houston, Texas, U.S.

Clover G Records or Clover G La Familia is Lil' Flip's record label. It was established in 2004.

=== Fashion designing ===
In 2004, Lil' Flip launched his footwear line, "Clover Footwear," which is branded under his self-owned label, Clover G Records. Additionally, Lil' Flip has a fashion clothing line called "Clover G Clothing," which is also branded under his self-owned label, Clover G Records.

=== Author ===
On April 15, 2014, Lil' Flip released his debut book titled "Don't Let the Music Industry Fool You!" The book was accompanied by a soundtrack album.

== Discography ==
=== Studio albums ===
- 2000: The Leprechaun
- 2002: Undaground Legend
- 2004: U Gotta Feel Me
- 2007: I Need Mine
- 2009: Respect Me
- 2009: Underground Legend 2
- 2010: Ahead of My Time
- 2013: The Black Dr. Kevorkian
- 2015: El Jefe
- 2016: The Art of Freestyle
- 2018: King
- 2018: Life
- 2019: The Art of Freestyle 2
- 2019: The Music Machine
- 2020: Feelings
- 2020: No Feelings
- 2020: The Leprechaun 2
- 2022: The Art of Freestyle 3
- 2022: Fondren Flip
- 2023: Worthing Wesley

=== Collaboration albums ===
- 2005: Kings of the South (with Z-Ro)
- 2006: Connected (with Mr. Capone-E)
- 2007: Still Connected (with Mr. Capone-E)
- 2008: All Eyez on Us (with Young Noble)
- 2008: Still Connected, Pt. 3 (with Mr. Capone-E)
- 2009: Certified (with Gudda Gudda)
- 2025: Kingz of the South, Vol. 2 (with Z-Ro)

=== Soundtrack album ===
- 2014: Don't Let the Music Industry Fool You

== Bibliography ==
- Don't Let The Music Industry Fool You! by Wesley "Lil' Flip" Weston (2014: Harris Royal Bloodline Publishing, April 15, 2014)
