= Still Connected =

Studio album by Lil' Flip & Mr. Capone-E
- Released: February 19, 2008
- Recorded: 2006–2007
- Genre: Southern hip hop, Chicano rap, West Coast hip hop
- Label: Clover G; Hi-Power

Still Connected is the second collaborative studio album by Lil' Flip and Mr. Capone-E, released in 2008. It peaked at No. 68 on the Billboard Top R&B/Hip-Hop Albums chart.

== Track listing ==
1. Still Connected
2. Get My Work from the Ese's (featuring Hi Power Soldiers & Clover G's)
3. They Got Me Trapped (Mr. Capone-E)
4. All Our Enemies Ducks Us (Lil' Flip)
5. I'm a Banger (T.I. Diss)
6. Real Talk
7. Would You (Lil' Flip)
8. Player Needs No Love (Mr. Capone-E)
9. Vato's Got My Back (Lil' Flip featuring Clover G's)
10. Still in My Drop Top (featuring Mr. Criminal)
11. If You Don't Know Me Back Then (Lil' Flip)
12. Play a Street Banger
13. Throw Your H's Up (Mr. Capone-E featuring Hi Power Soldiers)
14. Young Fly and Flashy (Lil' Flip)
15. Wanna Roll with Us
16. Times in the Hood (Mr. Capone-E)
17. Hi Power Music 2008 (Mr. Capone-E & Lil' Flip)

== Trivia ==
The song "I'm A Banger" is a diss towards T.I., at the time when Lil' Flip and T.I. had beef.

The song "Still In My Drop Top" is a part 2 after the song "Drop Top Chevy" featuring Mr. Capone-E, Mr. Criminal & Lil' Flip.
