= Bo Diddley discography =

- Studio albums: 27
- Live albums: 6
- Compilation albums: 25
- Singles: 37
- Appearances on singles: 5
- Appearances on albums: 6

The discography of American rock and roll musician Bo Diddley, includes 37 singles, 24 studio albums, 24 compilation albums, six live albums, and several EPs. He has also appeared on five singles and eight albums.

Bo Diddley only had one Top 40 hit on the Billboard Hot 100 and only one album charting on the Billboard 200, but he has achieved worldwide fame and respect as a member of the founding of rock and roll, and has had his songs covered by many diverse artists. He had 10 entries on the US Billboard R&B chart, and two more hits, in 1963 and 1965, on the UK Singles Chart.

== Studio albums ==
All studio albums released as LPs, except ^{†} which were released as cassettes and ^{^} which were CDs.

Title	Release date =June 1958	Notes	Label Catalog No.
Bo Diddley	June 1958		Chess; LP-1431
Go Bo Diddley	July 1959		Checker; LP-1436
Have Guitar Will Travel	January 1960	named after Have Gun–Will Travel	Checker; LP-2974
Bo Diddley in the Spotlight	April 1960	featuring "Road Runner"	Checker; LP-2976
Bo Diddley Is a Gunslinger	December 1960	#20 on the UK Albums Chart	Checker; LP-2977
Bo Diddley Is a Lover	September 1961		Checker; LP-2980
Bo Diddley's a Twister	March 1962	based on the twist craze	Checker; LP-2982
Bo Diddley	August 1962	#11 on the UK Albums Chart, #117 on the Billboard 200	Checker; LP-2984
Bo Diddley & Company	January 1963	first album with The Duchess	Checker; LP-2985
Surfin' with Bo Diddley	June 1963		Checker; LP-2987
Two Great Guitars	August 1964	with Chuck Berry	Checker; LP/S-2991
Hey! Good Lookin'	July 1965		Checker; LP-2992
500% More Man	December 1965		Checker; LP/S-2996
The Originator	December 1966		Checker; LP/S-3001
Super Blues	June 1967	with Muddy Waters and Little Walter	Checker; LP/S-3008
The Super Super Blues Band	February 1968	with Muddy Waters and Howlin' Wolf	Checker; LP/S-3010
The Black Gladiator	July 1970		Checker; LPS-3013
Another Dimension	May 1971		Chess; CH-50001
Where It All Began	May 1972		Chess; CH-50016
The London Bo Diddley Sessions	January 1973		Chess; CH-50029
Big Bad Bo	1974		Chess; CH-50047
20th Anniversary of Rock & Roll	January 1976		RCA Victor; APL 1-1229
Ain't It Good To Be Free ^{†}	1983	Limited release recorded in Hawthorne, Florida and first home studio album since Bo Diddley Is a Gunslinger	BoKay; 069
Breakin' Through the B.S. ^{†^}	1989	Home studio album recorded in Archer, Florida	Triple X 51017
Living Legend	1989	Home studio album recorded in Archer, Florida	New Rose; ROSE-118
This Should Not Be ^{^}	1992	Home studio album recorded in Albuquerque, New Mexico	Triple; X 51130
A Man Amongst Men ^{†^}	May 21, 1996	#8 on the Blues Albums chart	Atlantic; 82896

== Compilation albums ==
All compilation albums released as LPs, except ^{†} which were released as cassettes and ^{^} which were CDs.

Title	Release date	Notes	Label Catalog No.
Hey! Bo Diddley	April 16, 1963	released in the UK only	Pye International; NPL 28025
Bo Diddley Rides Again	1963	UK release, #19 on UK Albums Chart	Pye International; NPL 28029
Bo Diddley In The Spotlight	1964	UK release	Pye International; NPL 28034
Bo Diddley's 16 All-Time Greatest Hits	1964		Checker; LP-2989
Got My Own Bag of Tricks	1972		Chess; 2CH-60005
Chess Masters, Volume One	1982		Chess; 4003
Chess Masters, Volume Two	1982		Chess; 4009
His Greatest Sides, Volume One	1984		Chess; CH-9106
His Greatest Sides, Volume Two	1984		Chess; CH-9107
The Chess Box ^{^}	1990		MCA/Chess; CHD2-19502
Rare & Well Done ^{†^}	September 10, 1991		MCA/Chess; CHC/D-9331
Bo Knows Bo ^{†^}	1995		Universal Special; 20872
His Best ^{^}	April 8, 1997		MCA/Chess; CHD-9373
20th Century Masters – The Millennium Collection: The Best of Bo Diddley ^{†^}	January 25, 2000		MCA; MCAC/D-112163
Eddy Mitchell Presente Les Rois Du Rock – Bo Diddley ^{^}	October 28, 2003		Universal International; 980781
Classic Bo Diddley: The Universal Masters Collection ^{^}	June 27, 2005		Universal Distribution; 9954
The Story of Bo Diddley: The Very Best of Bo Diddley ^{^}	2006		Chess; CHD-9832296
The Definitive Collection ^{^}	April 17, 2007	#2 on the Blues Albums chart	Geffen/Chess; B0008786-02
I'm a Man: The Chess Masters, 1955-1958 ^{^}	September 2007		Hip-O/UMe; B0009231-02
Rock 'N' Roll Legends ^{^}	February 18, 2008		Chess; 5305167
Road Runner: The Chess Masters, 1959-1960 ^{^}	June 20, 2008		Hip-O/UMe; B0011076-02
Gold ^{^}	October 28, 2008		Geffen/Chess; B0011781-02
Ride On: The Chess Masters, 1960-1961 ^{^}	July 21, 2009		Hip-O/UMe; B0012946-02

== Live albums ==
All live albums released as LPs, except ^{^} which were CDs.

Title	Release date	Notes	Label/Catalog No.
Bo Diddley's Beach Party	December 1963	#13 on UK Albums Chart	Checker LP 2988
I'm a Man	1977		MF Productions 2002
Bo Diddley & Co. – Live	1985		New Rose FC-009
Hey... Bo Diddley: In Concert	1986		MF Productions
Live at the Ritz ^{^}	1988	with Ronnie Wood	JVC
Live ^{^}	February 1, 1994		Triple X 51162

== Singles ==
Year	Titles (A-side, B-side) Both sides from same album except where indicated	Chart positions			Album
Year	Titles (A-side, B-side) Both sides from same album except where indicated	US Hot	US R&B	UK	Album
1955	"Bo Diddley" b/w "I'm a Man"	—	1	—	Bo Diddley (1958)
1955	"Diddley Daddy" b/w "She's Fine, She's Mine" (non-album track)	—	11	—	Bo Diddley (1958)
1955	"Pretty Thing" b/w "Bring It to Jerome"	—	4	34	Bo Diddley (1958)
1956	"Diddy Wah Diddy" b/w "I Am Looking for a Woman"	—	—	—	Bo Diddley (1958)
1956	"Who Do You Love?" b/w "I'm Bad" (non-album track)	—	—	—	Bo Diddley (1958)
1956	"Cops and Robbers" b/w "Down Home Special" (non-album track)	—	—	—	Have Guitar, Will Travel
1957	"Hey! Bo Diddley" b/w "Mona" (from Have Guitar, Will Travel, as "I Need You Baby")	—	—	—	Bo Diddley (1958)
1957	"Say! Boss Man" b/w "Before You Accuse Me"	—	—	—	Bo Diddley (1958)
1958	"Hush Your Mouth" b/w "Dearest Darling"	—	—	—	Bo Diddley (1958)
1958	"Willie and Lillie" b/w "Bo Meets the Monster" (non-album track)	—	—	—	Go Bo Diddley
1959	"I'm Sorry" b/w "Oh Yeah"	—	17	—	Go Bo Diddley
1959	"Crackin' Up" b/w "The Great Grandfather"	62	14	—	Go Bo Diddley
1959	"Say Man" b/w "The Clock Strikes Twelve"	20	3	—	Go Bo Diddley
1959	"Say Man, Back Again" b/w "She's Alright" [single version lacks album vocal overdub]	106	23	—	Have Guitar, Will Travel
1960	"Road Runner" b/w "My Story" (on album as "Story of Bo Diddley"	75	20	—	In the Spotlight
1960	"Walkin' and Talkin'"/	—	—	—	In the Spotlight
1960	"Crawdad"	111	—	—	In the Spotlight
1960	"Gunslinger" b/w "Signifying Blues" (from In the Spotlight)	—	—	—	Bo Diddley Is a Gunslinger
1961	"Not Guilty" b/w "Aztec"	—	—	—	Bo Diddley Is a...Lover
1961	"Pills" b/w "Call Me" (non-album track)	—	—	—	The Originator
1962	"You Can't Judge a Book by the Cover" b/w "I Can Tell"	48	21	—	Bo Diddley (1962)
1963	"The Greatest Lover in the World" b/w "Surfer's Love Call" (from Surfin' with Bo Diddley)	—	—	—	Non-album track
1964	"Memphis" b/w "Monkey Diddle" (non-album track)	—	—	—	Bo Diddley's Beach Party
1964	"Jo-Ann" b/w "Mama, Keep Your Big Mouth Shut" (non-album track)	—	—	—	The Originator
1964	"Chuck's Beat" (with Chuck Berry) b/w"Bo's Beat"	—	—	—	Two Great Guitars
1965	"Hey, Good Lookin'" b/w "You Ain't Bad" (from The Originator)	—	—	39	Hey! Good Lookin'
1965	"500% More Man" b/w "Let the Kids Dance"	—	—	—	500% More Man
1966	"We're Gonna Get Married" b/w "Do the Frog"	—	—	—	Non-album tracks
1966	"Ooh Baby" b/w "Back to School"	88	17	—	Non-album tracks
1967	"Wrecking My Love Life" b/w "Boo-Ga-Loo Before You Go"	—	—	—	Non-album tracks
1968	"I'm High Again" b/w "Another Sugar Daddy"	—	—	—	Non-album tracks
1969	"Bo Diddley 1969" b/w "Soul Train"	—	—	—	Non-album tracks
1971	"The Shape I'm In" b/w "Pollution"	—	—	—	Another Dimension
1971	"I Said Shut Up Woman" b/w "I Love You More Than You'll Ever Know"	—	—	—	Another Dimension
1972	"Infatuation" b/w "Bo Diddley-Itis"	—	—	—	Where It All Began
1972	"Bo-Jam" b/w "Husband-in-Law"	—	—	—	The London Bo Diddley Sessions
1973	"Don't Want No Lyin' Woman" b/w "Make a Hit Record"	—	—	—	The London Bo Diddley Sessions
1976	"Drag On" b/w "Not Fade Away"	—	—	—	The 20th Anniversary of Rock 'N' Roll
1996	"Bo Diddley Is Crazy"; Also: "Can I Walk You Home" "A Man Amongst Men"; CD Maxi-Single	—	—	—	A Man Amongst Men

"—" denotes a release that did not chart.

== Appearances on albums ==
Year	Title	Artist(s)	Record label (Catalog No.)	Details
1972	Blues Rock Cookbook: Montreux Festival	various	Chess; 2CH-60015	Performer on "Diddley Daddy", "I Hear You Knockin'", "You Can't Judge a Book by Its Cover", "Baby What You Want Me To Do", and "Early in the Morning".
1983	På Tur	Vazelina Bilopphøggers	Slagerfabrikken; SLP 99002	Appears as guitarist on "Hallingsprætten"
1987	La Bamba	various	Slash; 1-25605	Performer on the re-recording of "Who Do You Love?"
1992	Chess Blues 1947-1967	various	MCA/Chess; CHD4-9340	Appears as guitarist on "You Got to Love Me" by Billy Boy Arnold.
1992	Il paese dei balocchi	Edoardo Bennato	Virgin; VDI 136	Guitar on "Here Comes Bo Diddley" (track 10)
1998	Blues Brothers 2000	various	Uptown/Universal; 53116	Appears as a member of The Louisiana Gator Boys on "Turn on Your Love Light"
2003	Dick's Picks Volume 30	Grateful Dead	Grateful Dead	Appears with the Grateful Dead on "Hey! Bo Diddley", "I'm a Man", "I've Seen Them All", "Jam", and "Mona".
2005	BananAtomic Mass	Munkeez Strikin Matchiz	Munkadelic/ximentmix	Appears as featured vocalist/guitarist on "Wreck It" with Parliament-Funkadelic keyboardist Bernie Worrell and Chuck D, of Public Enemy
2009	The Complete Chess Masters: 1950–1967	Little Walter	Hip-O Select; B0012636-02	Appears as a guitarist on the previously unreleased songs "Feel So Bad" and "Make It Alright".

== Appearances on singles ==
Year	Artist	Title	Details
1955	Little Walter and His Jukes	"Roller Coaster"	Composer/guitarist
1955	Little Walter and His Jukes	"Hate to See You Go"	Guitarist
1956	Billy Stewart	"Billy's Blues"	Guitarist
1957	Billy Stewart	"Baby, You're My Only Love"	Guitarist
1959	The Marquees	"Hey Little School Girl"	Co-writer/orchestra director
