= Bo Diddley (disambiguation) =

Bo Diddley (1928–2008) was an American rhythm and blues vocalist, guitarist and songwriter.

Bo Diddley may also refer to:

- "Bo Diddley" (Bo Diddley song), 1955
- "Bo Diddley", 1993, a song by Emerson, Lake and Palmer, released on the boxed set The Return of the Manticore
- "Bo Diddley" (Arvingarna song), 1995
- Bo Diddley (1958 album)
- Bo Diddley (1962 album)
- Bo Diddley beat
