= His Best (Bo Diddley album) =

Greatest hits album by Bo Diddley
- Released: April 8, 1997
- Recorded: March 2, 1955 – September 11, 1966 in Chicago, Illinois
- Genre: Rock and roll, rhythm and blues
- Label: Chess/MCA
- Producer: Leonard Chess, Phil Chess, Bo Diddley, Andy McKaie

Bo Diddley chronology
Hey! Bo Diddley/Bo Diddley (1996)	His Best (1997)	20th Century Masters (2000)

Alternative cover
- The 2007 reissue by Geffen Records as The Definitive Collection

Professional ratings
Review scores
Source	Rating
The Penguin Guide to Blues Recordings	3.5/4 stars

His Best is a 1997 greatest hits compilation album by American rock and roll icon Bo Diddley released by Chess and MCA Records on April 8, 1997 (see 1997 in music). The album was re-released by Geffen Records on April 17, 2007 as The Definitive Collection with a different album cover. The Definitive Collection reached #2 on Billboard magazine's Blues Albums chart on June 21, 2008, which was the week that the album debuted on the charts.

== Album background ==
As a greatest hits album, His Best features almost all of Bo Diddley's chart hits that appeared in The Billboard from 1955's "Bo Diddley" through 1967's "Ooh Baby" (except for "Say Man, Back Again"), although it excluded the UK hit "Hey Good Looking". The album features songs listed in chronological order by when the songs were recorded.

== Track listing ==
All tracks are written by Ellas McDaniel, except where noted.

No.	Title	Recording date	Length
1.	"Bo Diddley"	March 2, 1955	2:48
2.	"I'm a Man"	March 2, 1955	3:02
3.	"You Don't Love Me (You Don't Care)"	March 2, 1955	2:54
4.	"Diddley Daddy" (McDaniel, Harvey Fuqua)	May 15, 1955	2:28
5.	"Pretty Thing" (Willie Dixon)	July 14, 1955	2:51
6.	"Bring It to Jerome" (Jerome Green)	July 14, 1955	2:30
7.	"I'm Looking for a Woman"	November 10, 1955	2:34
8.	"Who Do You Love?"	May 24, 1956	2:30
9.	"Hey! Bo Diddley"	February 8, 1957	2:14
10.	"Mona (I Need You Baby)"	February 8, 1957	2:23
11.	"Before You Accuse Me"	August 15, 1957	3:07
12.	"Say Man"	January 29, 1958	3:16
13.	"Dearest Darling"	January 29, 1958	2:54
14.	"Crackin' Up"	December 1958	2:07
15.	"The Story of Bo Diddley"	Early September 1958	2:54
16.	"Road Runner"	Late September 1958	2:48
17.	"Pills"	May 2, 1961	2:52
18.	"I Can Tell" (Samuel Smith)	June 27, 1962	4:35
19.	"You Can't Judge a Book By Its Cover" (Dixon)	June 27, 1962	3:16
20.	"Ooh Baby"	September 11, 1966	3:49

== Personnel ==
Per liner notes and Allmusic

- Bo Diddley – vocals, guitar, violin, producer
- Jerome Green – maracas, co-lead vocals, background vocals
- Jody Williams – guitar on "I'm Looking for a Woman" and "Who Do You Love?"
- Peggy Jones – guitar, background vocals
- Ricky Jolivet – guitar
- Lester Davenport – harmonica
- Billy Boy Arnold – harmonica
- Little Walter – harmonica on "Diddley Daddy"
- Lafayette Leake – piano
- Otis Spann – piano
- Willie Dixon – bass
- James Bradford – bass
- Jesse James Johnson – bass
- Chester Lindsey – bass
- Clifton James – drums
- Frank Kirkland – drums
- Billy Downing – drums
- Edell Robertson – drums
- Eddie Drennon – electric violin on "Ooh Baby"
- Cornelia Redmond – tambourine on "Ooh Baby"
- Bobby Baskerville – background vocals
- The Carnations – background vocals
- Geary Chansley – photo research
- The Flamingos – background vocals
- Mike Fink – design on The Definitive Collection
- Erick Labson – digital remastering
- The Moonglows – background vocals
- David Redfern – photography
- Andy McKaie – reissue producer and compiler
