= Hey! Bo Diddley =

Single by Bo Diddley

from the album Bo Diddley
- B-side: "Mona"
- Released: April 1957
- Recorded: February 8, 1957, in Chicago
- Genre: Rhythm and blues
- Length: 2:17
- Label: Checker 860
- Songwriter: Ellas McDaniel
- Producers: Leonard Chess, Phil Chess, Bo Diddley

Bo Diddley singles chronology
"Cops & Robbers" (1957)	"Hey! Bo Diddley" (1957)	"Say, Boss Man" (1958)

"Hey! Bo Diddley" is Bo Diddley's eighth single released by Checker Records (not to be confused with the song "Bo Diddley") and was released as a single in April 1957 by Checker Records. The single's B side was "Mona" (later known as "I Need You Baby").

== Recording ==
"Hey! Bo Diddley" was recorded in Chicago on February 8, 1957 – the same day as "Mona". The song was produced by Diddley with Leonard and Phil Chess, and backing Diddley (vocals, guitar) were Jerome Green (maracas), and either Frank Kirkland or Clifton James (drums). The backing vocals on the song were Peggy Jones and the Flamingos.

== Rhythm ==
Unlike some other Bo Diddley songs (e.g. "Bo Diddley", Gunslinger, and "Pretty Thing") "Hey! Bo Diddley" does not feature a Bo Diddley beat.

== Live versions ==
The song was recorded either July 5 or 6 at Myrtle Beach, South Carolina and released on the 1964 live album, Bo Diddley's Beach Party with the Dutchess. The song was performed live with Ronnie Wood on Live at the Ritz in 1988.

== Cover versions ==
"Hey! Bo Diddley" was covered by The Moody Blues, Bill Black, John P. Hammond, Kenny Rogers, Ronnie Hawkins, Maureen Tucker on Playin' Possum and Life in Exile After Abdication, the Grateful Dead on Steppin' Out with the Grateful Dead: England '72, The Temptations and the Mary Stokes Band. There is also a spanish version of this song performed by the Mexican Rock'n'Roll band Los Seven Days which was titled "A Bailar Con Los Seven Days." (Dance with the Seven Days)

"Pay Bo Diddley" is a cover of the song with new lyrics, referring to the many years where Diddley received no royalties for his work.

== Album releases ==
In 1962 Chess Records released a 12" L.P. titled Hey! Bo Diddley. In November 1963 Pye International Records released a 7" EP titled Hey! Bo Diddley. In 1996 Beat Goes On released a compilation CD called Hey! Bo Diddley/Bo Diddley with "Hey! Bo Diddley" as the first track. The song was also released on several greatest hits albums including 16 All-Time Greatest Hits and His Best.
