= You Can't Judge a Book by the Cover =

1962 song by Willie Dixon

Single by Bo Diddley

from the album Bo Diddley
- A-side: "I Can Tell"
- Released: July 1962
- Recorded: Chicago, June 27, 1962
- Genre: Rock and roll, rhythm and blues
- Length: 2:43
- Label: Checker
- Songwriter: Willie Dixon
- Producer: Ralph Bass

"You Can't Judge a Book by the Cover" (alternatively "You Can't Judge a Book by Its Cover") is a 1962 song by rock and roll pioneer Bo Diddley. Written by Willie Dixon, the song was one of Diddley's last record chart hits. Unlike many of his well-known songs, "You Can't Judge a Book by the Cover" does not rely on the Bo Diddley beat. A variety of rock and other performers have recorded renditions of the song.

== Composition and lyrics ==
"You Can't Judge a Book by the Cover" is based on a sixteen-bar blues structure that "boasts a beat that's utterly compulsive and primordial, but closer to a way-speeded up walking rhythm than to the standard Diddley pattern", according to Richie Unterberger in a song review. Percussionist Jerome Green added maracas to the recording, which Unterberger calls "an utterly entrancing rhythm that does much to add to the power of the song".

While noting Diddley's rhythm guitar contribution, Dixon biographer Mitsutoshi Inaba comments on Diddley's "unique vocal style": "He freely uses various vocal techniques: glissandi in a wide range, howling, changing dynamics and tone quality, altering melodic and non-melodic singing." Dixon's lyrics describe a variety of situations to illustrate that one should not judge them by their appearance, before repeating the title phrase:

You can't judge an apple by looking at a tree
You can't judge honey by looking at the bee
You can't judge a daughter by looking at the mother
You can't judge a book by looking at the cover

In his autobiography, Dixon explained that the lyrics were "his [Bo Diddley's] bag 100% ... and when I told him about it, he liked it immediately". Diddley's original recording breaks the fourth wall by encouraging the listener to turn his or her radio up after the first verse.

== Releases and charts ==
Checker Records, one of the Chess brothers' record labels, released "You Can't Judge a Book by the Cover" as a single in July 1962. A review in Billboard magazine gave the single's flip-side "I Can Tell" four stars, while noting "the backing [single side] is a stomping groove", which it gave three stars. However, only "You Can't Judge a Book by the Cover" appeared in the magazine's charts, reaching number 21 on the R&B chart and number 48 on the Billboard Hot 100.

Checker included the song on his Bo Diddley studio album released in August 1962 (not the same as the 1958 compilation album by the same name). Later, the song appeared on several Diddley compilations, such as the comprehensive Bo Diddley – The Chess Box (1990) and the single CD His Best (1997). Diddley's recording is also included the box set Chess prepared for songwriter Willie Dixon.

== Legacy ==
In his biography, Unterberger includes "You Can't Judge a Book by the Cover" as one of Diddley's "stone-cold standards of early, riff-driven rock & roll at its funkiest". The song has been recorded by numerous artists in a variety of styles.
