= Bo Diddley's a Twister =

Studio album by Bo Diddley
- Released: 1962
- Recorded: February and June, 1961
- Studio: Washington, D.C.
- Length: 34:06
- Label: Checker; LP-2982
- Producer: Phil Chess

Bo Diddley chronology
Bo Diddley Is a Lover (1961)	Bo Diddley's a Twister (1962)	Bo Diddley (1962)

Bo Diddley's a Twister is the seventh studio album by American musician Bo Diddley released on the Checker label in 1962 .

== Reception ==
Professional ratings
Review scores
Source	Rating
AllMusic	2.5/5 stars

AllMusic reviewer Bruce Eder stated "A lot of the material on this record was rushed out in half-finished form, in order to get an album out that cashed in on the "twist" craze of early 1962. ... In all, it isn't half-bad for an album that nobody intended as such, though most of the best has been included on various hits compilations".

== Track listing ==
All tracks credited to Ellas McDaniel

1. "Detour" – 2:00
2. "She's Alright" – 4:07
3. "Doin' the Jaguar" – 2:10
4. "Who Do You Love?" – 2:30
5. "Shank" – 1:58
6. "Road Runner" – 2:49
7. "My Babe" – 1:49
8. "The Twister" – 2:09
9. "Hey! Bo Diddley" – 2:13
10. "Hush Your Mouth" – 2:52
11. "Bo Diddley" – 2:31
12. "I'm Looking for a Woman" – 2:34
13. "Here 'Tis" – 2:28
14. "I Know" – 2:48

== Personnel ==
- Bo Diddley – vocals, guitar
- Peggy Jones, Norma-Jean Wofford – guitar, background vocals
- Jesse James Johnson – bass
- Frank Kirkland – drums
- Jerome Green – maracas, backing vocals
- The Vibrations, Carrie Mingo, Grace Ruffin, Margie Clark, Sandra Bears – background vocals
