= Two Great Guitars =

Studio album by Bo Diddley and Chuck Berry
- Released: August 1964
- Recorded: March 1964
- Studio: Tel Mar Studios, Chicago, Illinois
- Genre: Rock and roll, instrumental rock
- Length: 30:35
- Label: Checker LP 2991
- Producer: Andy McKaie

Bo Diddley chronology
Bo Diddley's Beach Party (1964)	Two Great Guitars (1964)	Hey! Good Lookin' (1965)

Chuck Berry chronology
Chuck Berry on Stage (1963)	Two Great Guitars (1964)	St. Louis to Liverpool (1964)

Singles from Two Great Guitars
- 1. "Chuck's Beat"/"Bo's Beat" Released: August 1964

Professional ratings
Review scores
Source	Rating
Allmusic	3/5 stars

Two Great Guitars is a studio album by Bo Diddley and Chuck Berry, released in August 1964 by Checker Records, a subsidiary of Chess Records. It was the first studio album issued by Berry after his release from prison in October 1963.

Diddley and Berry were friends, and both recorded for Chess. The album consists of two lengthy spontaneous instrumental jams and a few recently recorded instrumentals by the two guitarists; additional instrumental recordings, three by Diddley and one by Berry, are included in the compact disc reissue. The album cover shows a Gibson ES-350T owned by Berry in addition to Diddley's custom Jupiter Thunderbird guitar.

== Track listing ==
=== Side one ===
1. "Liverpool Drive" (Chuck Berry) – 2:56
2. "Chuck's Beat" (Berry, Ellas McDaniel) – 10:39

=== Side two ===
1. "When the Saints Go Marching In" (Traditional; arranged by McDaniel) – 2:52
2. "Bo's Beat" (McDaniel, Berry) – 14:08

=== Reissue bonus tracks ===
5. "Fireball" (McDaniel) – 2:51
6. "Stay Sharp" (McDaniel) – 3:44
7. "Chuckwalk" (Berry) – 2:30
8. "Stinkey" (McDaniel) – 2:35

== Personnel ==
=== Musicians ===
- Chuck Berry – guitar (tracks 1, 2, 4, 7)
- Bo Diddley – guitar (tracks 2, 3, 4, 5, 6, 8)
- Norma-Jean Wofford (a.k.a. The Duchess) – second guitar (tracks 3, 5, 8)
- Peggy Jones (a.k.a. Lady Bo) – second guitar (track 6)
- Jerome Green – maracas (tracks 2, 3, 4, 6)
- Lafayette Leake – piano (tracks 2, 4)
- Jesse James Johnson – bass guitar (tracks 2, 4, 6)
- Billy Downing – drums (tracks 2, 4)

=== Technical ===
- Andy McKaie – producer
- Ron Malo – engineer
- Esmond Edwards – cover photography
- Don Bronstein – cover design and artwork
