= Bo Diddley Is a Gunslinger =

Bo Diddley is a Gunslinger

Studio album by Bo Diddley
- Released: December 1960
- Recorded: October 1959 – February 1960
- Length: 30:15
- Label: Checker LP-2977
- Producers: Leonard Chess, Phil Chess, Bo Diddley

Bo Diddley chronology
| Bo Diddley in the Spotlight (1960) | Bo Diddley is a Gunslinger (1960) | Bo Diddley Is a Lover (1961) |

Professional ratings
Review scores
| Source | Rating |
|---|---|
| AllMusic | 4/5 stars |
| Jazz Journal | Positive |

Bo Diddley Is a Gunslinger is the fifth studio album by American rock and roll pioneer Bo Diddley released in December 1960 by Checker Records. The album title comes from the album's first track called "Gunslinger" and the cover art has Bo Diddley dressed in Western-style clothing. The songs for Bo Diddley is a Gunslinger were recorded from October 1959 to February 1960. Several tracks of interest are "Sixteen Tons" which Bo was supposed to perform on The Ed Sullivan Show, the title track, and "Diddling" (an instrumental between guitar and saxophone).

== Background ==
The album's title was derived from its opening track, "Gunslinger". The cover art features Diddley dressed in an outfit reminiscent of a Western gunslinger, reflecting the influence of the Western genre, which was popular in American popular culture at the time. Musically, the album combines elements of rock and roll, rhythm and blues, and blues, centered on Diddley's distinctive guitar playing and rhythms.

The album includes the title track "Gunslinger", as well as "Ride on Josephine", "Doing the Craw-Daddy", "Cadillac", and "Cheyenne". "Sixteen Tons" is Diddley's interpretation of a song written by country music musician Merle Travis, while "Diddling" is an instrumental track centered on guitar playing.

In a review published in the December 1961 issue of the British music magazine Jazz Journal, Tony Standish praised Diddley's ability to introduce variations in rhythm and arrangement while retaining his characteristic vitality and sense of swing. He spoke favorably of several tracks, including "Ride on Josephine" and "Cadillac", and noted that Diddley's distinctive musical personality was evident throughout the album.

== Songs ==
=== "Gunslinger" ===
This song was originally released as the A-side of Checker single 965 in November 1960. The single's B-side "Signifying Blues" was never released on the album. The song features a Bo Diddley beat. Warren Zevon performed the song as "Bo Diddley's a Gunslinger" on his 1981 live album Stand in the Fire.

=== "Ride on Josephine" ===
"Ride on Josephine" was a rock and roll song with backing vocals and piano work by either Otis Spann, Lafayette Leake, or Billy Stewart. The song has been covered by George Thorogood & The Destroyers, Sleepy LaBeef, Eric Sardinas, and Van Morrison.

=== "Sixteen Tons" ===
Bo Diddley was asked to perform "Sixteen Tons" on The Ed Sullivan Show but performed "Bo Diddley" instead.

=== "Cadillac" ===
The song "Cadillac" features Gene Barge on tenor saxophone, and has been covered by The Kinks, The Downliners Sect, New Colony Six, and sung as a duet by Van Morrison and Linda Gail Lewis. Cadillac was also the name of the guitar that is featured on the album's front cover.

=== Other songs/styles ===
The song "Googlia Moo", as well as "No More Lovin'" and others, gives the album a doo-wop feel.

== Track listing ==
All tracks are written by Ellas McDaniel, except where noted.

Side one
| No. | Title | Length |
|---|---|---|
| 1. | "Gunslinger" | 1:50 |
| 2. | "Ride on Josephine" | 3:00 |
| 3. | "Doing the Craw-Daddy" | 2:58 |
| 4. | "Cadillac" | 2:39 |
| 5. | "Somewhere" | 2:25 |
| Total length: | | 12:52 |

Side two
| No. | Title | Writer(s) | Length |
|---|---|---|---|
| 6. | "Cheyenne" | | 2:05 |
| 7. | "Sixteen Tons" | Merle Travis, arranged by McDaniel | 2:30 |
| 8. | "Whoa Mule (Shine)" | | 2:28 |
| 9. | "No More Lovin'" | | 2:25 |
| 10. | "Diddling" | | 2:20 |
| Total length: | | | 11:48 |

1988 bonus tracks
| No. | Title | Length |
|---|---|---|
| 11. | "Working Man" | 3:00 |
| 12. | "Do What I Say" | 2:46 |

2004 reissue bonus tracks
| No. | Title | Writer(s) | Length |
|---|---|---|---|
| 13. | "Prisoner of Love" | Russ Columbo, Leo Robin, Clarence Gaskill | 2:31 |
| 14. | "Googlia Moo" | | 3:02 |
| 15. | "Better Watch Yourself" | | 2:54 |

== Personnel ==
Per allmusic

- Bo Diddley – lead vocals, lead guitar
- Jerome Green – maracas, backing vocals
- Willie Dixon – bass
- Bobby Baskerville – bass
- Jesse James Johnson – electric bass
- Billy Downing – drums
- Clifton James – drums
- Lafayette Leake – piano
- Otis Spann – piano
- Billy Stewart – piano
- Peggy Jones – rhythm guitar, backing vocals
- Gene Barge – tenor saxophone
- Johnny Carter – backing vocals
- Harvey Fuqua – backing vocals
- Lily "Bee Bee" Jamieson – backing vocals
- Gloria Morgan – backing vocals
- Nate Nelson – backing vocals
- Leonard Chess – producer
- Andy McKaie – Reissue producer
- Vartan – Art direction

== Charts ==
The album spent one week on the UK Album Charts on November 9, 1963 at No. 20.

== Release history ==
| Region | Date | Label | Format | Catalog |
|---|---|---|---|---|
| United States | December 1960 | Checker Records | mono LP | LP 2297 |
| United Kingdom | November 1963 | Pye Jazz Records | mono LP | NJL 33 |
| United States | August 13, 1966 | Checker Records | 4-track cartridge | 21-369A |
| United States | 1988 | Chess Records | CD | CHD-9285 |
| United States | April 13, 2004 | Geffen Records | CD | 000176102 |
| Worldwide reissue | 2008 | Universal International | LP | 1529771 |
