= Gretsch Jupiter Thunderbird =

Reproduction of an electric guitar model

Jupiter
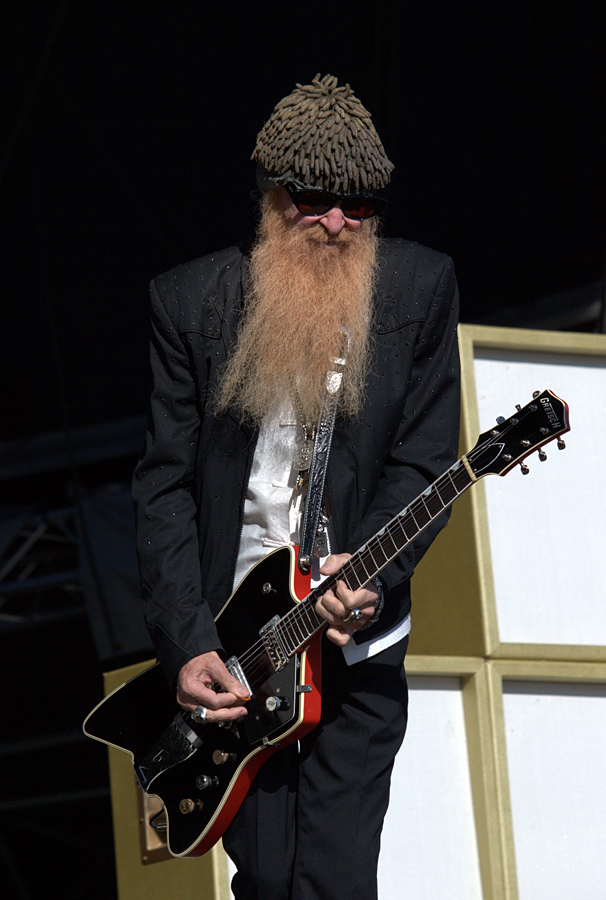
- Billy Gibbons performing live in 2010 with his Gretsch Jupiter.
- Manufacturer: Gretsch
- Period: 1959 – present

Construction
- Body type: Solid body with chambers
- Neck joint: Set
- Scale: 24.75"

Woods
- Body: Mahogany with Maple top
- Neck: Mahogany
- Fretboard: Ebony with thumb inlays

Hardware
- Bridge: Adjusto-matic bridge G-cutout tailpiece
- Pickup: Two Power'Tron Plus humbuckers

Colors available
- Red

The Gretsch G6199 "Billy-Bo" Jupiter is a reproduction of a guitar designed by Bo Diddley (1928–2008) in 1959 and produced by a former Gretsch employee.

Diddley built his first guitar in 1945, it was trapezoid shaped since Diddley felt that the regular shaped Gibson L5 he was playing were hindering his live performances. The smaller trapezoid and rectangular guitars allowed him to keep jumping around on stage while still playing his guitar. Diddley went on to play a number of rectangular guitars built by himself and others, which soon became one of his trademarks throughout his career.

In 1959 Bo approached a former Gretsch employee known only as "Juliano" to build him some guitars from his own designs using Gretsch necks and hardware. The resulting three guitars (Jupiter Thunderbird, Cadillac and Cigar Box), two of which were named after popular automobiles became synonymous with Diddley and his '60s stage partner "The Duchess" Norma-Jean Wofford.

The Jupiter was later donated as a gift to ZZ Top frontman Billy Gibbons who used it on some ZZ Top recordings. Since Gibbons did not want to risk subjecting the rare guitar to touring and live performances, Gibbons approached Gretsch with the idea of reproducing the Jupiter Thunderbird. The result was the G6199 "Billy-Bo" Jupiter Thunderbird which Gretsch launched in 2005.

Some time ago, Bo gave me the guitar as a gift. It was during the recent ZZ Top recordings when the engineering crew and I snaked through the guitar vault searching for that 'certain-something' guitar and there it was! We didn't risk subjecting such a rare instrument to the rigors of the road so this new, reproduction model was recreated with some BFG Mojo thrown in for good measure. It's now the main stage guitar with a groove.

— Billy F. Gibbons

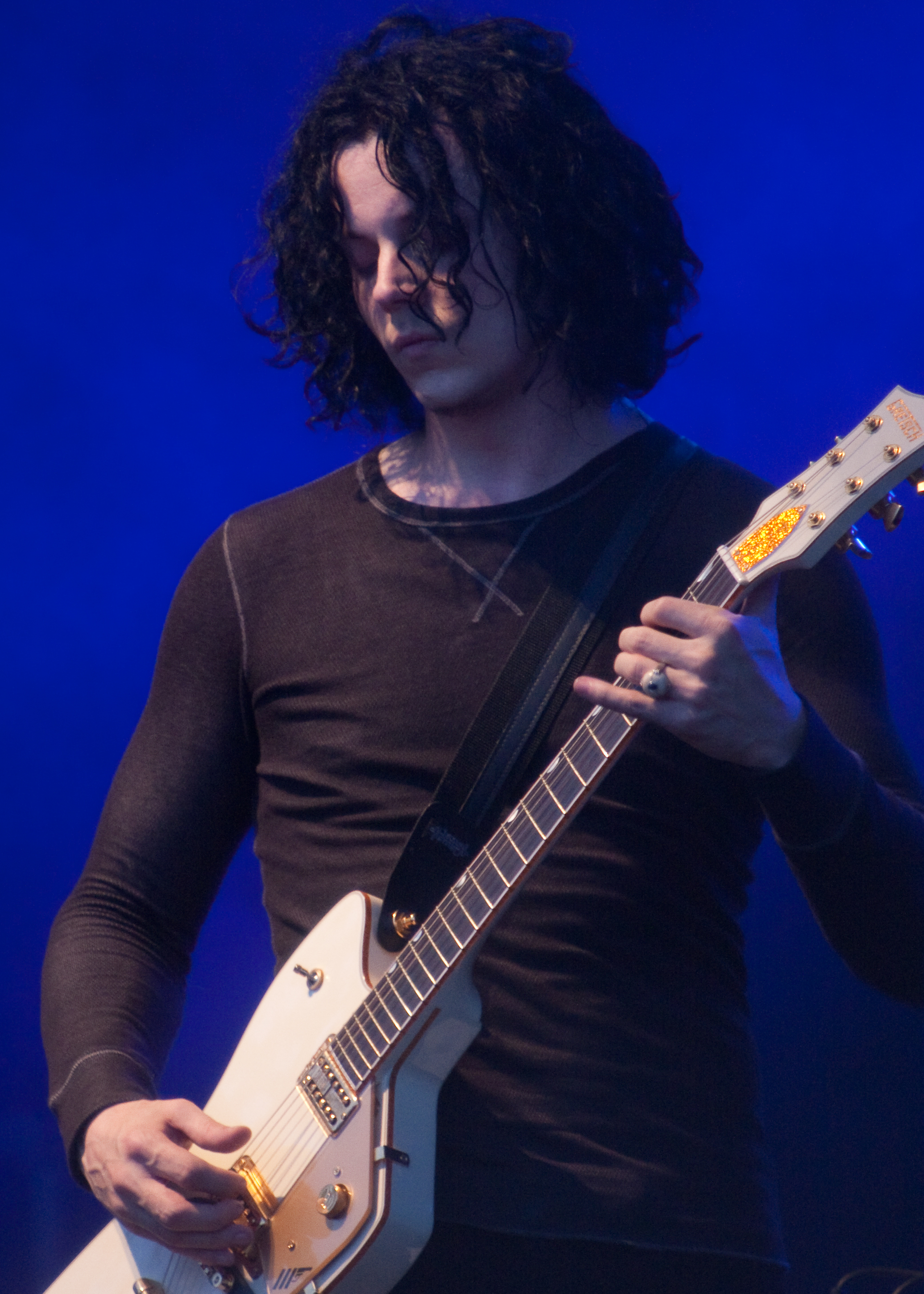
Jack White performing with The Dead Weather playing his white Jupiter Thunderbird.

Later Gretsch also launched the G6199B "Billy-Bo" Jupiter Thunderbird Bass which is a four string bass identical to the guitar, the G5810 Bo Diddley inspired by Diddley's rectangular guitars and the G5850 Mini Diddley a miniature version of the rectangular guitar.

Notable players include Jack White who can be seen playing a customised Jupiter Thunderbird in the music video for the single "Another Way to Die", it is also his main guitar with The Dead Weather. Laur Joamets, former guitarist for Sturgill Simpson, can be seen playing a white Jupiter Thunderbird during Simpson's performances on The Late Show with Stephen Colbert and Saturday Night Live.
