= Bo Diddley's Beach Party =

Live album by Bo Diddley
- Released: January 1964
- Recorded: July 5–6, 1963
- Venue: The Beach Club, Myrtle Beach, South Carolina
- Genre: Rock and roll
- Length: 37:17
- Label: Checker
- Producer: Marshall Chess, Max Cooperstein

Bo Diddley chronology
Surfin' with Bo Diddley (1963)	Bo Diddley's Beach Party (1964)	Two Great Guitars (1964)

Professional ratings
Review scores
Source	Rating
AllMusic	5/5 stars
Record Mirror	4/5 stars

Bo Diddley's Beach Party is the eleventh album by rock musician Bo Diddley. Recorded live in concert in July 1963 at the Beach Club in Myrtle Beach, South Carolina, it is one of rock music's earliest live remote recordings. The album was a success in the UK Albums Chart reaching No. 13 on July 3 and stayed on the charts for six weeks.

== Track listing ==
All songs credited to Ellas McDaniel (Bo Diddley), except as noted

Side one

1. "Memphis" (Chuck Berry) – 2:09
2. "Gunslinger" – 2:29
3. "Hey! Bo Diddley" – 2:43
4. "Old Smokey" – 3:05
5. "Bo Diddley's Dog" – 3:38

Side two

1. "I'm All Right" – 3:45
2. "Mr. Custer" – 2:56
3. "Bo's Waltz" – 3:09
4. "What's Buggin' You (Crackin' Up)" – 2:38
5. "Road Runner" – 3:42

== Personnel ==
Performers

- Bo Diddley – lead vocals, lead guitar
- Jerome Green – drums, maracas, backing vocals
- Norma-Jean Wofford (The Duchess) – rhythm guitar, backing vocals

Production

- Marshall Chess, Max Cooperstein – producers
- John Brooks – engineer
