= Super Blues =

Studio album by Bo Diddley, Muddy Waters, Little Walter
- Released: June 1967
- Recorded: January 1967
- Studio: Tel Mar Studios (Chicago)
- Genre: Chicago blues
- Length: 47:28
- Label: Checker LP/S 3008
- Producer: Ralph Bass, Andy McKaie

Bo Diddley chronology
Road Runner (1967)	Super Blues (1967)	The Super Super Blues Band (1968)

Muddy Waters chronology
More Real Folk Blues (1967)	Super Blues (1967)	The Super Super Blues Band (1968)

Little Walter chronology
Little Walter (1964)	Super Blues (1967)	Windy City Blues (1986)

Professional ratings
Review scores
Source	Rating

Super Blues is a 1967 studio album by a blues supergroup consisting of Bo Diddley, Muddy Waters, and Little Walter. The album was released in both mono and stereo formats by Checker Records in June 1967. A follow-up album The Super Super Blues Band was released later that year and featured Howlin' Wolf replacing Little Walter.

== Background ==
The album was produced by Ralph Bass for Chess Records, although Marshall and Phil Chess were present at the sessions and were credited with supervision. The album's recording engineers were Doug Brand and Ron Malo.

The song featured on the album were several of the musicians most famous songs includes Bo Diddley's "I'm a Man", Muddy Waters' "I Just Want to Make Love to You", and Little Walter's "My Babe".

Forced Exposure describes the recording as an informal jam session and wrote: "Critics remain divided over the merits of Super Blues as an album, but most agree it occupies a remarkable place in history both as an experiment and as a shape of things to come. Recorded at a time when electric blues' influence on the mainstream was at its height, shades of Waters & Bo's future proto-funk experimentation can be heard throughout Super Blues' rough-at-the-seams, yet still loose and relaxed tracks."

== Track listings ==
=== Original album ===
Side one

1. "Long Distance Call" (McKinley Morganfield) – 5:15
2. "Who Do You Love?" (Ellas McDaniel) – 4:10
3. "I'm a Man" (Elias McDaniel) – 5:40
4. "Bo Diddley" (Elias McDaniel) – 4:35

Side two

1. "You Can't Judge A Book By Its Cover" (Willie Dixon) – 4:25
2. "I Just Want to Make Love to You" (Willie Dixon) – 6:07
3. "My Babe" (Willie Dixon) – 3:52
4. "You Don't Love Me (You Don't Care)" (Elias McDaniel) – 4:05

=== 1992 bonus tracks ===
9. "Studio Chatter" (Elias McDaniel) – 1:27
10. "Sad Hours" (Walter Jacobs) – 5:09
11. "Juke" (Walter Jacobs) – 3:31

== Personnel ==
Per liner notes

- Bo Diddley – vocals, guitar
- Muddy Waters – vocals, guitar
- Little Walter – vocals, harmonica
- Sonny Wimberley – bass guitar
- Frank Kirkland – drums
- Buddy Guy – guitar
- Otis Spann – piano
- Cookie Vee – tambourine, vocals

Technical

- Ralph Bass – producer
- Ron Malo – engineer
- Doug Brand – engineer
- Don Bronstein – cover design
- Leslie Sims – cover art
- Vartan – reissue art direction
