= Say Man =

Single by Bo Diddley
- B-side: "The Clock Strikes Twelve"
- Released: 1959
- Recorded: 1958
- Genre: Rhythm and blues
- Length: 3:09
- Label: Checker 931
- Songwriter(s): Ellas McDaniel

Bo Diddley singles chronology
| "Crackin Up" (1959) | "Say Man" (1959) | "Say Man, Back Again" (1959) |

"Say Man" is a song by American musician Bo Diddley. Written under his real name of Ellas McDaniel, it was recorded by Bo Diddley in 1958 and released as a single in 1959 on Checker 931.

The recording became his biggest US pop hit, reaching number 20 on the Hot 100, and number three on the R&B chart. It arose from a jam session between Diddley and his maracas player Jerome Green, and featured Diddley and Green trading insults in the style of the word game known as The Dozens.

Bo Diddley said of the song: "A lot of the things I did in the Chess studios, we were just goofin' around ... They played it back, and it shocked all of us! Of course, they cut out all the dirty parts." Music critic Maury Dean, while rejecting the idea that the track is "the first rap song", says that it is "the first major soul tune to feature a total spoken patter of pal put-downs to a rockin' beat ... . Bo's lightning right hand chops chords like sugar cane. The incessant beat throbs into the hot American evening nocturne of streetwise savvy. Rap – with a side of ghetto-blast humor."

The recording also appeared on the album Go Bo Diddley.
