= The Super Super Blues Band =

1968 studio album by Howlin' Wolf, Muddy Waters and Bo Diddley

Studio album by Howlin' Wolf, Muddy Waters and Bo Diddley
- Released: 1968
- Recorded: September 1967
- Studio: Ter Mar Recording Studio, Chicago, IL
- Genre: Blues, rhythm and blues
- Length: 44:04
- Label: Checker; LP-3010
- Producer: Willie Dixon

Howlin' Wolf chronology
More Real Folk Blues (1967)	The Super Super Blues Band (1968)	The Howlin' Wolf Album (1969)

Muddy Waters chronology
Super Blues (1967)	The Super Super Blues Band (1968)	Electric Mud (1968)

Bo Diddley chronology
Super Blues (1967)	The Super Super Blues Band (1968)	The Black Gladiator (1970)

The Super Super Blues Band is an album by blues musicians Howlin' Wolf, Muddy Waters, and Bo Diddley, released on the Checker label in 1968. It is one of several Chess albums of the 1960s to document an informal jam session between several of the label's artists, alongside Two Great Guitars (1964) and Super Blues (1967).

== Reception ==
Professional ratings
Review scores
Source	Rating
AllMusic	2/5 stars

AllMusic reviewer Ken Chang stated, "Wolf adamantly refuses to back down from his rivals, resulting in a flood of contentious studio banter that turns out to be more entertaining than the otherwise unmemorable music from this stylistic train wreck. Although Wolf and Waters duke it out in earnest on the blues standards, the presence of Diddley (and his rave-up repertoire) makes the prospect of an ensemble impossible; in the end, there are just too many clashing ingredients to make the mix digestible. ... At least it sounds like they had fun doing it".

== Track listing ==
1. "Long Distance Call" (McKinley Morganfield) – 9:10
2. "Medley: Ooh Baby / Wrecking My Love Life" (Ellas McDaniel / Clifton James, Kay McDaniel) – 6:28
3. "Sweet Little Angel" (Robert Nighthawk) – 6:30
4. "Spoonful" (Willie Dixon) – 4:10
5. "Diddley Daddy" (McDaniel) – 5:10
6. "The Red Rooster" (Dixon) – 7:20
7. "Goin' Down Slow" (James B. Oden) – 4:47

== Personnel ==
- Howlin' Wolf – vocals, guitar, harmonica
- Muddy Waters – vocals, guitar
- Bo Diddley – vocals, guitar
- Otis Spann – piano
- Hubert Sumlin – guitar
- Buddy Guy – bass
- Frank Kirkland – drums
- Cookie Vee – vocals
