= Bo Diddley in the Spotlight =

Studio album by Bo Diddley
- Released: 1960
- Recorded: September 1959 – April 1960
- Studio: Chicago, IL
- Length: 35:47
- Label: Checker; LP-2976
- Producer: Leonard Chess, Phil Chess

Bo Diddley chronology
Have Guitar Will Travel (1960)	Bo Diddley in the Spotlight (1960)	Bo Diddley Is a Gunslinger (1960)

Bo Diddley in the Spotlight is the fourth album by musician Bo Diddley, recorded in 1959-60 and released on the Checker label. The album contains the hit single "Road Runner".

== Reception ==
Professional ratings
Review scores
Source	Rating
AllMusic	4/5 stars
The Encyclopedia of Popular Music	3/5 stars
MusicHound Rock: The Essential Album Guide	3/5 stars
The Rolling Stone Album Guide	3/5 stars

AllMusic's Bruce Eder wrote that "there are surprises from these 1960-vintage recordings ... that make this record more than worthwhile."

== Track listing ==
All tracks by Ellas McDaniel

1. "Road Runner" – 2:45
2. "Story of Bo Diddley" – 2:42
3. "Scuttle Bug" – 2:20
4. "Signifying Blues" – 2:31
5. "Let Me In" – 1:52
6. "Limber" – 2:26
7. "Love Me" – 2:20
8. "Craw-Dad" – 2:25
9. "Walkin' and Talkin'" – 2:38
10. "Travellin' West" – 1:44
11. "Deed and Deed I Do" – 2:15
12. "Live My Life" – 2:35

== Personnel ==
- Bo Diddley – vocals, guitar
- Peggy Jones – guitar, background vocals
- Jody Williams – guitar
- Lafayette Leake, Otis Spann – piano
- Willie Dixon – bass
- Clifton James, Frank Kirkland – drums
- Jerome Green – maracas, backing vocals
- Gene Barge – tenor saxophone
- Billy Boy Arnold – harmonica
