= Diddley Daddy =

Single by Bo Diddley
- B-side: "She's Fine, She's Mine"
- Released: June 1955
- Recorded: May 15, 1955
- Studio: Universal Recording Corp. (Chicago)
- Genre: Rhythm and blues
- Length: 2:28
- Label: Checker 819
- Songwriters: Ellas McDaniel, Harvey Fuqua
- Producers: Leonard Chess, Phil Chess, Bo Diddley

Bo Diddley singles chronology
"Bo Diddley" (1955)	"Diddley Daddy" (1955)	"Pretty Thing" (1956)

"Diddley Daddy" is a song by Bo Diddley. The song was issued as a single on Checker Records in June 1955. His second single, it followed on the heels of the success of the eponymous "Bo Diddley". The song spent four weeks on the Billboard R&B chart in the summer of 1955, peaking at No. 11.

== Writing and recording ==
The song was recorded on May 15, 1955, in Chicago. Originally called "Diddy Diddy Dum Dum", it started out as a Billy Boy Arnold composition, which Leonard Chess, owner of Chess Records (Checkers was a subsidiary label of Chess), had heard Arnold play and wanted Diddley to record. However, Arnold had just signed a contract with Vee-Jay Records, and had recorded the song the day before at Universal Recording Corporation. When Chess wanted Arnold to sing the song, the latter realized he had a contract, responding, "I can't do it...I just recorded it for Vee-Jay." Chess responded, "Goddam! Ain't this a bitch!" A solution, however, was found on the spot: Diddley and Harvey Fuqua, who happened to be around, rewrote the lyrics.

As it happened, the harmonica player Little Walter was in the studio, and he asked Billy Boy Arnold for his harp; Walter plays the long solo after the first verse (Arnold plays harmonica on the B-side, "She's Fine, She's Mine"). Also decided at "the spur of the moment" was to have Chicago doo-wop group The Moonglows sing background vocals.

== Critical praise ==
One of Bo Diddley's signature songs, "Diddley Daddy" evidenced Diddley's maturation process as an artist. It was described as a "terrific nugget" and an "infectious" "upbeat rocker". The Chicago Sun-Times said it combined "outrageous braggadocio with a beat that resounds like an endless sexual shudder."

Marking Diddley's popularity in England, the Rolling Stones, who early in their career often played Diddley songs live, covered the song (along with Diddley's "Road Runner") on their first demo, recorded on March 11, 1963. Brian Jones would later borrow Diddley's guitar figure from the song for the band's 1965 single "19th Nervous Breakdown".

== Bo Diddley, Diddley Daddy ==
The title of the song has come to stand for Bo Diddley himself, as evidenced from articles about Diddley by Val Wilmer and Stuart Colman. After Diddley's death, in 2008, the phrase directly referred to Diddley in various obituaries; the usage reflected Diddley's habit of self-reference as well as the way others talked about him, such as Tom Petty: "Elvis is King. But Diddley is Daddy."

== Reissues ==
A Bo Diddley compilation CD issued in 1988 is also called Diddley Daddy. The song is featured on many greatest hits albums by Bo Diddley including 16 All-Time Greatest Hits and His Best.

== Personnel ==
- Bo Diddley – lead vocals, lead guitar
- Little Walter – harmonica
- Jerome Green – maracas
- Clifton James – drums
- The Moonglows – backing vocals

== Notable covers ==
- Rolling Stones, first demo
- The Liverbirds, a British all-female beat group, recorded the song for a 1965 single. Their version reached No. 5 on the German Singles Chart.
- Dutch Mason, Canadian blues musician. The song was a staple of his band's live set.
- The Super Super Blues Band (1968), Howlin Wolf, Muddy Waters and Bo Diddley trio recorded it together as part of album "The Super Super Blues Band" for Chess Records.
- Chris Isaak, on Heart Shaped World (1989)
- The Pretty Things & Yardbirds Blues Band, on Chicago Blues Jam 1991 and Wine, Women & Whiskey (1994)
