= Bobby Moore & the Rhythm Aces =

American soul band

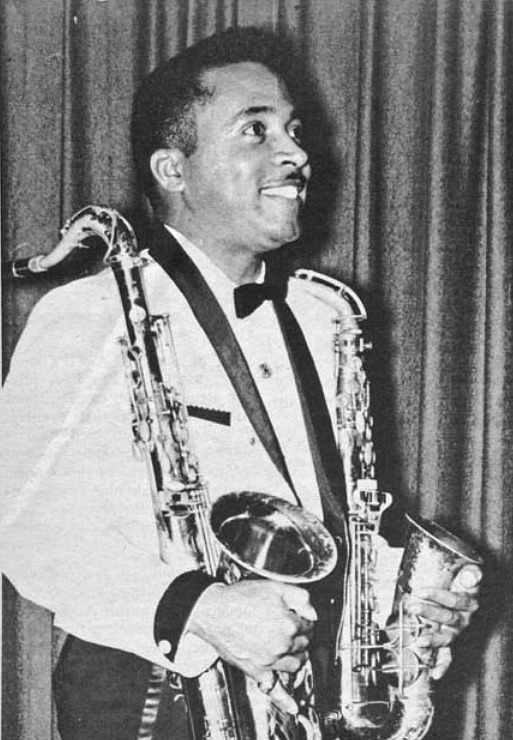
- Moore c. 1966

Background information
- Origin: Montgomery, Alabama, U.S.
- Genres: Soul
- Years active: 1952–present
- Labels: Checker Records
- Past members: Robert Moore; Larry Moore; Chico Jenkins; Marion Sledge; Joe Frank; Clifford Laws; John Baldwin, Jr. Larry Moore/> Danny Yates(1968-1969)

Bobby Moore & the Rhythm Aces is an American soul group from Montgomery, Alabama.

== Career ==
Robert "Bobby" Moore (July 17, 1930 – February 1, 2006) was a tenor saxophonist and bandleader. He was born in New Orleans, Louisiana, and joined the US Army in his teens. While stationed at Fort Benning in Georgia in 1952, he formed the first line-up of the Rhythm Aces with members of the Fort Benning marching band; they toured the south playing at military events and clubs for a few years. When he moved to Montgomery, Alabama after being demobilized in 1961, Moore put together a new group, featuring his son, Larry Moore (saxophone), Chico Jenkins (vocals, guitar), Marion Sledge (guitar), Joe Frank (double bass), Clifford Laws (keyboards), and John Baldwin, Jr. (drums). They did local Alabama gigs and played behind national touring acts such as Sam Cooke and Ray Charles.

In late 1965, they recorded a song written by Moore, "Searching For My Love", at the FAME Studios in Muscle Shoals, Alabama. The recording was heard by Leonard and Marshall Chess, who bought the rights to release it on their Checker label. The single hit number 27 on the U.S. Billboard Hot 100 chart, and number 7 on the R&B chart, in 1966, and sold more than one million copies. A second single, "Try My Love Again", just barely cracked the Billboard Hot 100, peaking at number 97, and a third, "Chained to Your Heart", released as a solo single by Bob Moore, also hit the R&B chart. In 1969, Checker released their last single, "Your Love and My Love Together", and then released the group.

The Rhythm Aces continued to perform as a group in Alabama with a constantly shifting lineup into the 2000s. Bobby Moore died of kidney failure in Montgomery, Alabama, on February 1, 2006, and his son, Larry Moore, became the group's leader. The Rhythm Aces are booked by Nashville based Crescent Moon Entertainment.
