= Bo Diddley & Company =

Studio album by Bo Diddley
- Released: 1962
- Recorded: 1962
- Studio: Ter Mar Recording Studios, Chicago, IL
- Length: 32:20
- Label: Checker; LP 2985
- Producer: Phil Chess

Bo Diddley chronology
Bo Diddley (1962)	Bo Diddley & Company (1962)	Surfin' with Bo Diddley (1963)

Bo Diddley & Company is the ninth studio album by musician Bo Diddley, released on the Checker label in late 1962.

== Reception ==
Professional ratings
Review scores
Source	Rating
AllMusic	4/5 stars

AllMusic reviewer Bruce Eder stated "This album is almost worth owning just for the cover photo of Bo Diddley and the Duchess, aka Norma-Jean Wofford, each with their axe. What makes it really cool, though, is the music, which is among the best of Diddley's 1960s output. ... It was records like this that helped keep Diddley's reputation alive in England when Americans stopped buying his stuff".

== Track listing ==
All tracks credited to Ellas McDaniel except where noted

1. "(Extra Read All About) "Ben"" (Billy Davis, Robert Holland) – 2:13
2. "Help Out" – 2:40
3. "Diana" – 2:38
4. "Bo's a Lumber Jack" – 2:39
5. "Lazy Women" – 2:39
6. "Mama Mia" – 2:52
7. "Gimme Gimme" – 2:04
8. "Put the Shoes on Willie" (Earl Hooker) – 2:34
9. "Pretty Girl" – 2:58
10. "Same Old Thing" – 2:45
11. "Met You on Saturday" – 2:38
12. "Little Girl" – 2:25

== Personnel ==
- Bo Diddley – vocals, guitar
- Norma-Jean Wofford – guitar, background vocals
- Willie Dixon – bass
- Clifton James – drums
- Jerome Green – maracas, backing vocals
