= Pretty Thing =

- The 1963 UK single release of "Pretty Thing" by Pye International Records.

Single by Bo Diddley

from the album Bo Diddley
- B-side: "Bring It to Jerome"
- Released: November 1955
- Recorded: July 14, 1955
- Studio: Universal Recording Corp. (Chicago)
- Genre: Rock and roll; rhythm and blues
- Length: 2:48
- Label: Checker
- Songwriters: Bo Diddley and Willie Dixon
- Producers: Leonard Chess, Phil Chess, Bo Diddley

Bo Diddley U.S. singles chronology
"Diddley Daddy" (1955)	"Pretty Thing" (1955)	"Diddy Wah Diddy" (1956)

Bo Diddley U.K. singles chronology
"Bo Diddley" (1963)	"Pretty Thing" (1963)	"Bo Diddley Is a Lover" (1963)

"Pretty Thing" is a 1955 song written by Bo Diddley and Willie Dixon and performed by Bo Diddley. The song was Diddley's third single release through Checker Records after "Diddley Daddy". In 1963, the song was released in the United Kingdom where it became Diddley's first of only two songs appearing on the UK Singles Chart, the other single being "Hey Good Lookin'".

== Writing and recording ==
Original releases of the single credited Bo Diddley (Ellas McDaniel) as the song's writer, but many later releases credit Willie Dixon. Bo Diddley himself said: "I remember Willie standin' over me, whisperin' the lyrics in my ear before I got to the next line! He was nice enough to give me part of the tune. It should be on the credits: 'McDaniel & Dixon'."

"Pretty Thing" was recorded by Bo Diddley on July 14, 1955 – the same day as "Bring It to Jerome". Producing the session at Universal Recording Corporation in Chicago, Illinois were the Chess brothers – Leonard and Phil – and Bo Diddley. The performers on the song were Bo Diddley (vocals, guitar), Jerome Green (maracas), Lester Davenport (harmonica), and Clifton James (drums).

== Single track listings ==
=== US 45 RPM/78 RPM ===
Side one

1. "Pretty Thing"

Side two

1. "Bring It to Jerome"

=== UK 45 RPM ===
Side one

1. "Pretty Thing"

Side two

1. "Road Runner"

== Chart performance ==
"Pretty Thing" was Diddley's second charter on the U.S. Billboard R&B Singles chart reaching no. 4 sometime in 1956, and is Diddley's third highest charter next to "Bo Diddley/I'm a Man" (no. 1) and "Say Man" (no. 3). "Pretty Thing" reached no. 34 on the UK Singles Chart.

== Cover versions ==
The Pretty Things, who took their name from the song, made a cover version of the song on their eponymous debut album in March 1965. The Animals recorded a version on a 1963 EP and also released it as a bonus track on Animalisms. Canned Heat released a studio version of the song on Vintage in 1970. John Hammond and The Nighthawks recorded a cover version of "Pretty Thing" at Vanguard Records studios in September 1979 and released it on Hot Tracks.
