= Surfin' with Bo Diddley =

Studio album by Bo Diddley
- Released: June 1963
- Recorded: 1963
- Genre: Surf
- Length: 27:12
- Label: Checker; LP 2987

Bo Diddley chronology
Bo Diddley & Company (1962)	Surfin' with Bo Diddley (1963)	Bo Diddley's Beach Party (1964)

Surfin' with Bo Diddley is the tenth studio album by American musician Bo Diddley released on the Checker label in 1963 .

== Reception ==
Professional ratings
Review scores
Source	Rating
AllMusic	1.5/5 stars

AllMusic reviewer Bruce Eder stated "This is where Bo -- or, more properly, Chess Records -- really took a wrong step, starting with the fact that The Originator himself is actually on only about half of the cuts here, the balance having been recorded by guitarist Billy Lee Riley. The idea wasn't as bad as it sounded, at least on paper -- Bo had been an indirect influence on tons of surf bands, with his signature grunge guitar-sound, but the surf music world wasn't ready for a Bo-style instrumental rendition of the Jerome Kern/Oscar Hammerstein II Showboat standard "Ol' Man River," ... The best tracks are "Cookie Headed Diddley" and "Surf, Sink or Swim," which come close to matching some of Bo's solid material from earlier albums and singles".

== Track listing ==
All tracks credited to except where noted

1. "What Did I Say" (Ray Charles) – 2:13
2. "White Silver Sands" (Charles 'Red' Matthews, Gladys Reinhart) – 2:48
3. "Surfboard Cha Cha" (Billy Lee Riley) – 2:12
4. "Surf, Sink or Swim" (Ellas McDaniel) – 3:20
5. "Piggy Back Surfers" (Riley) – 2:11
6. "Surfers Love Call" (McDaniel) – 2:50
7. "Twisting Waves" (Martin Willis) – 1:45
8. "Wishy Washy" (Riley) – 2:21
9. "Hucklebuck" (Paul Williams) – 2:08
10. "Old Man River" (Jerome Kern, Oscar Hammerstein II arranged by Bo Diddley) – 2:22
11. "Oop's He Slipped" (Riley) – 1:57
12. "Low Tide" (McDaniel) – 2:05

== Personnel ==
=== Tracks 4, 6, 10 & 12 ===
- Bo Diddley – vocals, guitar
- Other musicians unidentified but possibly include:
- Norma-Jean Wofford – guitar, background vocals
- Jerome Green – maracas, backing vocals

=== Tracks 1–3, 5, 7–9 & 11 ===
- Bill Riley – guitar
- Jimmy Wilson – piano
- Martin Willis – saxophone
- Unidentified – bass, drums
