= Bo Diddley (1962 album) =

Studio album by Bo Diddley
- Released: August 1962
- Length: 31:48
- Label: Checker LP-2984
- Producer: Ralph Bass

Bo Diddley chronology
Bo Diddley's a Twister (1962)	Bo Diddley (1962)	Bo Diddley & Company (1962)

Singles from Bo Diddley
- 1. "You Can't Judge a Book by the Cover" Released: July 1962

Bo Diddley is the eighth studio album by American rock and roll pioneer Bo Diddley, not to be confused with the 1958 album of the same name. The 1962 album was released as Checker LP-2984 in August 1962 and featured the Willie Dixon-penned classic "You Can't Judge a Book by the Cover", which was released as a 7" 45 rpm single in July 1962.

== Success in Britain ==
In Britain, Bo Diddley was released as an LP by Pye International Records. The UK release charted at #11 on the UK Albums Chart. The success of the album followed the UK package tour that Bo had begun at the beginning of the year with the Everly Brothers, Little Richard, and the Rolling Stones.

Due to the album's success in the UK, many British bands recorded songs from the record.

== Track listing ==
All songs were written and composed by Ellas McDaniel (Bo Diddley), except where noted.

Side one

1. "I Can Tell" (Samuel Smith, McDaniel) – 4:27
2. "Mr. Khrushchev" – 2:56
3. "Diddling" – 2:12
4. "Give Me a Break" – 2:07
5. "Who May Your Lover Be" – 2:54
6. "Bo's Bounce" – 1:35

Side two

1. "You Can't Judge a Book by the Cover" (Willie Dixon) – 2:43
2. "Babes in the Woods" – 2:10
3. "Sad Sack" – 2:38
4. "Mama Don't Allow No Twistin'" – 2:10
5. "You All Green" – 3:03
6. "Bo's Twist" – 2:32

== Personnel ==
Performers

- Bo Diddley – lead vocals, lead guitar
- Jerome Green – maracas, backing vocals
- Peggy Jones – rhythm guitar, backing vocals
- Frank Kirkland – drums
- Clifton James – drums
- Willie Dixon – bass

Production

- Ralph Bass – producer
- Phil Chess – supervision
- Ron Malo – engineer
- Don Bronstein – cover art

== Charts ==
On the UK Albums Chart Bo Diddley reached #11 on November 2, 1963. The album reached #117 on the Billboard magazine's Top LP's chart.
