= Hey! Good Lookin' (album) =

Studio album by Bo Diddley
- Released: 1965
- Recorded: April 14 & 15, 1964
- Studio: Ter Mar Recording Studio, Chicago, IL
- Length: 30:50
- Label: Checker; LP-2992

Bo Diddley chronology
Two Great Guitars (1964)	Hey! Good Lookin' (1965)	500% More Man (1965)

Hey! Good Lookin' is the eleventh studio album by American musician Bo Diddley released on the Checker label in 1965.

== Reception ==
Professional ratings
Review scores
Source	Rating
AllMusic	3/5 stars

AllMusic reviewer Bruce Eder stated "One of Bo Diddley's least-known albums ... at the point when none of his records were selling in America. With an edgy, raunchy sound and modern record techniques (it's in stereo), Diddley and band come up with a solid '60s version of his original sound. The title track is a real jewel... Other tracks sound like they'd have worked well as part of extended jams of the kind that Diddley did on-stage ... There is some filler here ... but that can be forgiven in view of the strength of the rest of the material.".

== Track listing ==
All tracks credited to Ellas McDaniel except where noted

1. "Hey, Good Lookin'" (Chuck Berry) – 2:55
2. "Mush Mouth Millie" – 2:03
3. "Bo Diddley's Hootenanny" – 2:21
4. "London Stomp" – 2:15
5. "Let's Walk Awhile" – 2:38
6. "Rooster Stew" – 2:18
7. "La, La, La" – 2:30
8. "Yeah, Yeah, Yeah" – 2:30
9. "Rain Man" – 3:15
10. "I Wonder Why (People Don't Like Me)" – 3:35
11. "Brother Bear" – 2:20
12. "Mummy Walk" – 2:10

== Personnel ==
- Bo Diddley – vocals, guitar
- The Duchess – guitar
- Lafayette Leake – piano
- Chester Lindsey – bass
- Edell Robertson – drums
- Jerome Green – maracas
- The Bo-Ettes – vocals
