= Bo Diddley (1958 album) =

Compilation album by Bo Diddley
- Released: 1958
- Recorded: March 2, 1955 – January 29, 1958
- Studio: Universal Recording, Chess (Chicago)
- Genre: Rock and roll; blues
- Length: 28:59
- Label: Chess
- Producer: Leonard Chess; Phil Chess; Bo Diddley

Bo Diddley chronology
Bo Diddley (1958)	Go Bo Diddley (1959)

Bo Diddley is the debut album by American rock and roll musician Bo Diddley. It collects several of his most influential and enduring songs, which were released as singles between 1955 and 1958. Chess Records issued the album in 1958. In 2012, it was ranked number 216 on Rolling Stone's 500 Greatest Albums of All Time list alongside his second album, Go Bo Diddley (1959). The ranking of the album pair dropped to number 455 in the 2020 update of the list.

== Critical reception ==
In his retrospective review for the AllMusic website, Matthew Greenwald gave Bo Diddley five out of five stars and recommended it as one of the "few" essential albums for listeners who want to "play rock & roll, real rock & roll". Greenwald said that its 12 songs are exemplary of the Bo Diddley beat: "This is one of the greatest rock sounds that you're likely to hear, and it's all on this one record, too."

In 2022, the recording was inducted into the Blues Hall of Fame, as a 'Classic of Blues Recording – Album'.

== Track listing ==
All tracks are written by Ellas McDaniel (Bo Diddley)

Side One
No.	Title	Length
1.	"Bo Diddley"	2:30
2.	"I'm a Man"	2:41
3.	"Bring It to Jerome"	2:37
4.	"Before You Accuse Me"	2:40
5.	"Hey! Bo Diddley"	2:17
6.	"Dearest Darling"	2:32

Side Two
No.	Title	Length
1.	"Hush Your Mouth"	2:36
2.	"Say, Boss Man"	2:18
3.	"Diddley Daddy"	2:11
4.	"Diddy Wah Diddy"	2:51
5.	"Who Do You Love?"	2:18
6.	"Pretty Thing"	2:48

== Personnel ==
From the CD reissue liner notes:

- Bo Diddley – vocals, guitar
- Jerome Green – co-lead vocals on "Bring It to Jerome", maracas
- Frank Kirkland – drums
- Clifton James – drums
- Otis Spann – piano
- Lafayette Leake – piano
- Willie Dixon – bass
- Billy Boy Arnold – harmonica on "I'm a Man"
- Little Walter – harmonica on "Diddley Daddy"
- Lester Davenport – harmonica on "Pretty Thing" and "Bring It to Jerome"
- Little Willie Smith – harmonica on "Diddy Wah Diddy"
- Jody Williams – guitar
- The Moonglows – backing vocals on "Diddley Daddy" and "Diddy Wah Diddy"
- Peggy Jones – backing vocals on "Hey! Bo Diddley", guitar
- The Flamingos – backing vocals on "Hey! Bo Diddley"
- Chuck Stewart – cover art
