= Bo Diddley Is a Lover =

Studio album by Bo Diddley
- Released: 1961
- Recorded: February 1961
- Studio: Bo Diddley's Home Studio, Washington, D.C.
- Length: 31:57
- Label: Checker; LP-2980
- Producer: Leonard Chess, Phil Chess

Bo Diddley chronology
Bo Diddley Is a Gunslinger (1960)	Bo Diddley Is a Lover (1961)	Bo Diddley's a Twister (1962)

Bo Diddley Is a Lover is the sixth album by musician Bo Diddley recorded in 1961 and released on the Checker label.

== Reception ==
Professional ratings
Review scores
Source	Rating
AllMusic	4/5 stars

AllMusic awarded the album 4 stars with reviewer Bruce Eder stating "There's not a bad song on this long-forgotten album; in fact, it's all good, and so little of it has been reissued that it's a crime. ... Find it, buy it, and savor it".

== Track listing ==
All tracks credited to Ellas McDaniel

1. "Not Guilty" – 2:16
2. "Hong Kong, Mississippi" – 3:03
3. "You're Looking Good" – 2:27
4. "Bo's Vacation" – 2:52
5. "Congo" – 2:44
6. "Bo's Blues" – 2:42
7. "Bo Diddley Is a Lover" – 2:37
8. "Aztec" – 2:33
9. "Back Home" – 2:33
10. "Bo Diddley Is Loose" – 3:06
11. "Love Is a Secret" – 3:09
12. "Quick Draw" – 1:55

== Personnel ==
- Bo Diddley – vocals, guitar
- Peggy Jones – guitar, background vocals
- Jesse James Johnson – bass
- Billy "Dino" Downing, Edell "Red" Robertson – drums
- Jerome Green – maracas, backing vocals
- The Moonglows (track 3); Carrie Mingo, Grace Ruffin, Margie Clark, Sandra Bears (tracks 1, 7 & 11) – background vocals
