= A Man Amongst Men =

Studio album by Bo Diddley
- Released: 1996
- Length: 54:06
- Label: Atlantic Records
- Producer: Mike Vernon

Bo Diddley chronology
This Should Not Be (1992)	A Man Amongst Men (1996)

A Man Amongst Men is the 24th and final studio album by American musician Bo Diddley and featured guest performances by Ron Wood, Keith Richards and Jimmie Vaughan. It was released on the Atlantic label in 1996. It peaked at #8 on the Billboard Top Blues Albums chart and garnered mixed reviews from critics.

== Track listing ==
All tracks are written by Ellas McDaniel, except where noted.

No.	Title	Writer(s)	Length
1.	"Bo Diddley Is Crazy"		4:51
2.	"Can I Walk You Home"		5:20
3.	"Hey Baby"		4:49
4.	"I Can't Stand It"	Ron Wood	5:18
5.	"He's Got a Key"		3:59
6.	"A Man Amongst Men"		4:00
7.	"Coatimundi"		5:19
8.	"That Mule"		6:25
9.	"Kids Don't Do It"	Scott "Skyntyte" Free	7:02
10.	"Oops! Bo Diddley"		7:20

== Personnel ==
- Bo Diddley – vocals, guitar
- Deb Hastings – bass
- Margo Lewis – Hammond B-3 organ
- Garry "Philosopher G" Mitchell – vocals
- Tom Major – drums
- Dave Keyes – piano, synthesizer
- Nunzio Signore – guitar
- Jerry Portnoy – harmonica
- Richie Sambora – guitar
- Dave Bronze – bass
- Wayne P. Sheehy – drums
- Mike Vernon – bass drum, maracas, tambourine, claves, pans, woodblock
- John Rosenberg – guitar

== Production ==
Recorded at Big House NYC Produced by Mike Vernon

- Martin Brass – engineer
- Ken Feldman – assistant engineer
