= The Black Gladiator =

Studio album by Bo Diddley
- Released: June 1970
- Recorded: January 26–27, 1970
- Studio: Ter Mar Recording Studio, Chicago, IL
- Length: 33:28
- Label: Checker

Bo Diddley chronology
| The Originator (1966) | The Black Gladiator (1970) | Another Dimension (1971) |

The Black Gladiator is the 14th studio album by American rock and roll musician Bo Diddley, released on the Checker label in June 1970.

== Background ==
In 1968, Marshall Chess, the son of Chess Records owner Leonard Chess, got Muddy Waters to record and release Electric Mud, an album which had a psychedelic sound, compared to the blues sound of Waters' earlier music. Despite mixed reception, Electric Mud was a success, selling 150,000 copies within the first six weeks of release. Following the album's success, Chess quickly got Howlin' Wolf to record The Howlin' Wolf Album, and Waters to record another album, After The Rain.

Bo Diddley also reached out to the new sound, and recorded The Black Gladiator in January 1970 at Ter Mar Studios, the same studio where Electric Mud and The Howlin' Wolf Album were recorded. Checker released the album in June 1970.

== Songs ==
The sound of The Black Gladiator is similar to the psychedelic sounds of Muddy Waters' Electric Mud, and Howlin' Wolf's The Howlin' Wolf Album, while also incorporating a funk sound. Unlike Waters' and Wolf's albums, The Black Gladiator contains all new material.

The lyrics of the songs vary. In "Black Soul", Bo embraces the black power movement of the post civil rights era, "If The Bible’s Right" is about the gospel, while "Funky Fly" contains nonsensical and gibberish lyrics. The album's closer, "I Don’t Like You" features Bo singing opera at the beginning, while the rest of the song has Bo and backup singer Cookie Vee trading insults.

== Reception ==
Professional ratings
Review scores
| Source | Rating |
|---|---|
| AllMusic | 2/5 stars |
| PopMatters | 9/10 |
| Record Collector | 4/4 stars |

AllMusic reviewer Bruce Eder calls "Power House" a "pretty good cut", but considers the rest of the album to be "for absolute completists only." Liam McManus of PopMatters praises the album, calling it "nearly flawless".

== Track listing ==
All songs were composed by Bobby Alexis, Kay McDaniel and Cornelia Redmond.

=== Side one ===
1. "Elephant Man" – 4:31
2. "You, Bo Diddley" – 3:17
3. "Black Soul" – 2:49
4. "Power House" – 2:51
5. "If the Bible's Right" – 3:11

=== Side two ===
1. "I've Got a Feeling" – 2:47
2. "Shut Up, Woman" – 3:47
3. "Hot Buttered Blues" – 3:56
4. "Funky Fly" – 3:09
5. "I Don't Like You" – 3:10
