= Another Dimension =

Studio album by Bo Diddley
- Released: May 1971
- Recorded: 1971
- Studio: Soundview Environmental Studios, Kings Park, New York
- Length: 35:12
- Label: Chess; CH 50001
- Producer: Bob Gallo

Bo Diddley chronology
The Black Gladiator (1970)	Another Dimension (1971)	Where It All Began (1972)

Another Dimension is the 15th studio album by musician Bo Diddley recorded in 1971 and released by the Chess label.

== Reception ==
Professional ratings
Review scores
Source	Rating
AllMusic	2/5 stars

Allmusic awarded the album 2 stars with reviewer Bruce Eder stating "By the end of 1970, most of Bo Diddley's income was derived from his concert work, primarily as an "oldies" act in rock 'n roll revival shows such as the Toronto concert where he shared a stage with the Plastic Ono Band. But he and Chess believed there was still a way for him to try and reach a wider, more contemporary audience. This album was the result, a valiant effort to update Bo Diddley's sound and image, somewhat in the vein of Muddy Waters' Electric Mud, only a few years later, and only slightly more successful in that quest".

== Track listing ==
1. "The Shape I'm In" (Robbie Robertson) – 3:27
2. "I Love You More Than You'll Ever Know" (Al Kooper) – 7:38
3. "Pollution" (Kay McDaniel) – 4:49
4. "Bad Moon Rising" (John Fogerty) – 2:46
5. "Down on the Corner" (Fogerty) – 3:28
6. "I Said Shutup Woman" (McDaniel) – 3:38
7. "Bad Side of the Moon" (Elton John, Bernie Taupin) – 3:05
8. "Lodi" (Fogerty) – 3:14
9. "Go for Broke" (John Berganti, Mike Mattia, Don Olsen, Carl Schickler) – 3:07

== Personnel ==
- Bo Diddley – vocals, guitar, percussion
- Mike Mattia – trumpet, keyboards
- Carl Schickler – trombone, guitar
- Eddie Covi – saxophone
- Al Kooper – keyboards, guitar
- Bob Gallo – guitar, percussion
- Sonny Hahn – guitar
- Don Olsen – bass
- John Birganti – drums
- Bob Dorsa, Vince Traina – percussion
- Cookie Vee – percussion, vocals
- Kathy Alson, Leslie Zimei – vocals
