= Peggy Jones (musician) =

American guitarist and pioneer of rock and roll (1940–2015)

- Also known as: Lady Bo
- Born: July 19, 1940; Harlem, New York City, U.S.
- Died: September 16, 2015 (aged 75)
- Genres: Rock and roll
- Instrument: Guitar

Peggy Jones (later Malone, July 19, 1940 – September 16, 2015), known on stage as Lady Bo in recognition of her relationship with Bo Diddley, was an American musician. A pioneer of rock and roll, Jones played rhythm guitar in Bo Diddley's band in the late 1950s and early 1960s, becoming one of the first (perhaps the first) female rock guitarists in a highly visible rock band, and was sometimes called the Queen Mother of Guitar.

== Early life ==
Born in Harlem, New York City, in 1940, Jones grew up in the Sugar Hill section, and attended the High School of Performing Arts where she studied tap and ballet dance and trained in opera. Even from a very young age, she found herself completely consumed with music; purchasing her first guitar at the age of 15. She was briefly in a local doo-wop group, the Bop Chords, which disbanded in 1957. A chance meeting with Bo Diddley, who was impressed to see a girl with a guitar case, led to an invitation to join Diddley's band as a guitarist and singer. She recorded with him from 1957 to 1961 or 1963, appearing on singles including "Hey! Bo Diddley", "Road Runner", "Bo Diddley's A Gunslinger", and the instrumental "Aztec" which she wrote and played all the guitar parts. However, throughout her career, Peggy Jones always strived to be an independent artist and was involved in an R&B band known as the Jewels, among other various names.

Throughout her time with Diddley, Jones maintained the separate career she had begun independently as a songwriter, session musician, and bandleader. She led her own band, the Jewels (also known as the Fabulous Jewels, Lady Bo and the Family Jewels, and various other names, but not to be confused with The Jewels), which became a top R&B band on the New York – Boston east coast club scene the 1960s and 1970s. She eventually left Diddley's band to concentrate on the Jewels and other activities. She was replaced with another female guitarist, Norma-Jean Wofford ("The Duchess").

Jones played guitar on Les Cooper's 1962 instrumental "Wiggle Wobble" and percussion on the 1967 hit "San Franciscan Nights" by Eric Burdon and The Animals and other recordings and later backed James Brown and Sam & Dave. She remained musically active well into the 21st century.

== Solo work ==
She left Bo Diddley's band in 1961 to focus on her work with the Jewels. In 1970, she re-joined Bo Diddley’s band, bringing The Jewels with her. Jones was known for playing the Roland guitar synthesizer, an experimental instrument not typically heard in rhythm and blues music.

== Relationships ==
Jones met Bo Diddley in 1956 backstage after playing with the Bop-Chords in the Apollo Theater in the neighborhood of Harlem. Many assumed that Lady Bo and Bo Diddley were a couple but that was not the case. She was married to the band’s bass player, Wally Malone.

Malone lived in the mountains of western Pennsylvania when he first met Jones in a New York club in the 1960s. Later, Jones invited Malone into her band in 1968 and got married. They both moved to San Jose, California where Jones played at a show with Bo Diddley and that was the time she received her nickname, “Lady Bo.” In 1962 Jones left Bo Diddley and recruited The Duchess to play for him. In 1979, Malone and Jones moved to Boulder Creek.

== Death ==
At the age of 75, Peggy Jones died on September 16, 2015, leaving behind her husband, Wally Malone. He announced his wife’s death via Facebook.

== Discography ==
With Bo Diddley

- Go Bo Diddley (Checker, 1959)
- Have Guitar Will Travel (Checker, 1960)
- Bo Diddley in the Spotlight (Checker, 1960)
- Bo Diddley Is a Gunslinger (Checker, 1960)
- Bo Diddley Is a Lover (Checker, 1961)
- Bo Diddley's a Twister (Checker, 1962)
- Bo Diddley (Checker, 1962)
