= Road Runner (Bo Diddley song) =

Single by Bo Diddley

from the album Bo Diddley in the Spotlight
- B-side: "My Story"
- Released: January 1960
- Recorded: September 1959
- Studio: Chess Studios (Chicago)
- Genre: Rock and roll, blues
- Length: 2:24
- Label: Checker
- Songwriter: Ellas McDaniel
- Producers: Leonard Chess, Phil Chess, Bo Diddley

Bo Diddley singles chronology
"Say Man, Back Again" (1960)	"Road Runner" (1960)	"Crawdaddy" (1960)

"Road Runner" is a 12-bar blues song performed by American rock and roll performer Bo Diddley, originally released as a single by Checker Records in January 1960, and later released on the LP record Bo Diddley in the Spotlight. The song reached #20 on Billboard magazine's Hot R&B Sides chart, and #75 on the Hot 100. The song has since been recorded by many artists.

The beep-beep chorus of the song clearly references the Roadrunner animated character with its triumphant beep-beep.

== Background and recording ==
The session(s) for "Road Runner" took place late September 1959 at Chess Studios in Chicago and backing Diddley (vocals, guitar) were Jerome Green (maracas, backing vocals), Clifton James (drums), guest pianist Otis Spann, Peggy Jones (guitar, backing vocals), and Bobby Baskerville (backing vocals).

== Other versions ==
The American garage band the Gants released "Road Runner" as a single in 1965 and it made #46 on the Billboard Hot 100 and is their only Billboard charter.

The early Canadian rock band the Count Victors released a cover version in 1963, Coral 62356.

Many British Invasion artists have recorded "Road Runner":

- "Road Runner" (as well as "Diddley Daddy") was recorded by the Rolling Stones during one of their first recording sessions at IBC Studios in London, England on March 11, 1963.
- In June 1963, Wayne Fontana & the Mindbenders released their version of "Road Runner" as the B-side of "Hello Josephine"; an alternate version was released on their “Road Runner” EP in June 1964.
- In March 1965, the Pretty Things released the song on their eponymous debut album. Their version was issued as a single and peaked at no. 11 on the Dutch Singles Chart.
- Also in March 1965, the Zombies released a version on their first album Begin Here.
- In May 1965, the Animals released the song on their second UK release of Animal Tracks.
- In June 1979, a medley of "Road Runner", "Join Together", and "My Generation Blues" was released by the Who on the soundtrack to The Kids Are Alright. The track was actually recorded in December 1975 at the Pontiac Silverdome.The Who covered the song sporadically during the 70's but haven't performed it since 1979.
- In March 2004, Aerosmith released a version on their covers album Honkin' On Bobo.

The song was also recorded as a part of the Backbeat soundtrack by a supergroup consisting of Dave Grohl, Dave Pirner, Thurston Moore, Mike Mills, Greg Dulli and Don Fleming.

The Finnish band Hurriganes covered the song on their 1974 album Roadrunner, considered one of the most iconic rock'n'roll albums in Finland.

== Use in media ==
Starting in February 2012, the song was being used as the background music in a Mazda car commercial for their SkyActiv technology. A short clip of Diddley singing it was included.

The song was featured in the 2013 Martin Scorsese film The Wolf of Wall Street.
