= Bo Diddley beat =

Musical rhythm popularized by Bo Diddley

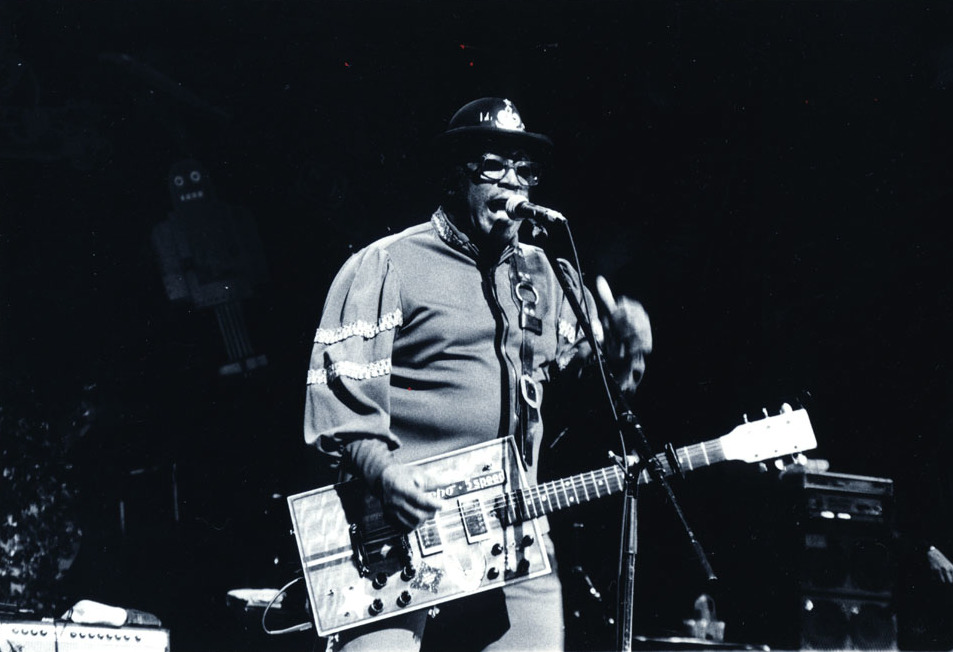
Bo Diddley beat takes its name from Bo Diddley and his eponymous song

The Bo Diddley beat is a syncopated musical rhythm that is widely used in rock and roll and pop music. The beat is named after rhythm and blues musician Bo Diddley, who introduced and popularized the beat with his self-titled debut single, "Bo Diddley", in 1955. The beat is essentially the Afro-Cuban clave rhythm or based on the clave or a variation thereof.

Music educator and author Mike Campbell explains that it "shows the relationship between Afro-Cuban music, Americanized Latin rhythms, and rock rhythm ... [The beats] are more active and complicated than a simple rock rhythm, but less complex than a real Afro-Cuban rhythm.

== History and composition ==
Bo Diddley beat.

The Bo Diddley beat is a variation of the 3–2 clave, one of the most common bell patterns found in Afro-Cuban music that has been traced to sub-Saharan African music traditions. It is also akin to the rhythmic pattern known as "shave and a haircut, two bits", that has been linked to Yoruba, Ewe and Fon drumming from West Africa. A folk tradition called "hambone", a style used by street performers who play out the beat by slapping and patting their arms, legs, chest, and cheeks while chanting rhymes has also been suggested.

According to musician and author Ned Sublette, "In the context of the time, and especially those maracas [heard on the record], 'Bo Diddley' has to be understood as a Latin-tinged record. A rejected cut recorded at the same session was titled only 'Rhumba' on the track sheets." Bo Diddley employed maracas, a percussion instrument used in Caribbean and Latin music, as a basic component of the sound. Jerome Green was the maraca player on Diddley's early records, initially using the instrument as a more portable alternative to a drum set. When asked how he began to use this rhythm, Bo Diddley gave many different accounts. In a 2005 interview with Rolling Stone magazine, he said that he came up with the beat after listening to gospel music in church when he was twelve years old.

== Use by other artists ==
Prior to Bo Diddley's self-titled song, the rhythm occurred in at least 13 rhythm and blues songs recorded between 1944 and 1955, including two by Johnny Otis from 1948. In 1944, "Rum and Coca Cola", containing the beat, was recorded by the Andrews Sisters and in 1952, a song with similar syncopation, "Hambone", was recorded by Red Saunders' Orchestra with the Hambone Kids.

Later, the beat was included in many songs composed by artists other than Bo Diddley:

- "I Wish You Would" by Billy Boy Arnold (1955)
- "Not Fade Away" by Buddy Holly (1957)
- "Cannonball" by Duane Eddy (1958)
- "Willie and the Hand Jive" by Johnny Otis (1958)
- "Hey Little Girl" by Dee Clark (1959)
- "(Marie's the Name) His Latest Flame" by Elvis Presley (1961)
- "Mickey's Monkey" by the Miracles (1963)
- "When the Lovelight Starts Shining Through His Eyes" by the Supremes (1963)
- "Rosalyn" by Pretty Things (1964)
- "Don't Doubt Yourself, Babe" by the Byrds (1965)
- "Mystic Eyes" by Them (1965)
- "I Want Candy" by the Strangeloves (1965)
- "Please Go Home" by the Rolling Stones (1966)
- "Bummer in the Summer" by Love (1967)
- "Get Me to the World on Time" by the Electric Prunes (1967)
- "She Has Funny Cars" by Jefferson Airplane (1967)
- "Magic Bus" by the Who (1968)
- "Sympathy for the Devil" by the Rolling Stones (1968)
- "1969" by the Stooges
- "Panic in Detroit" by David Bowie (1973)
- "Shame, Shame, Shame" by Shirley & Company (1974)
- "Custard Pie" by Led Zeppelin (1975)
- "New York Groove" by Hello (1975)
- "Billy Bones and the White Bird" by Elton John (1975)
- "She's the One" by Bruce Springsteen (1975)
- "Bad Blood" by Neil Sedaka (1975)
- "American Girl" by Tom Petty and the Heartbreakers (1977)
- "Big Alice" by Don Pullen (1977)
- "Hateful" by the Clash (1979)
- "Rudie Can't Fail" by The Clash (1979)
- "(She's So) Selfish" by the Knack (1979)
- "Lovers Walk" by Elvis Costello and the Attractions (1980)
- "Cuban Slide" by the Pretenders (1980)
- "What A Blow" by Ian Gomm (1980)
- "A Modern Lesson (Bo Diddley)" by Aksak Maboul (1980)
- "Europa and the Pirate Twins" by Thomas Dolby (1981)
- "Don't Let Him Go" by REO Speedwagon (1981)
- "Hare Krsna" by Hüsker Dü (1984)
- "How Soon Is Now?" by the Smiths (1985) (Diddley-style tremolo)
- "Mr. Brownstone" by Guns N' Roses (1987)
- "Faith" by George Michael (1987)
- "Ruby Dear" by Talking Heads (1988)
- "Desire" by U2 (1988)
- "Movin' On Up" by Primal Scream (1991)
- "Osez Joséphine" by Alain Bashung (1991)
- "Tribal Thunder" by Dick Dale and the Del-Tones (1993)
- "No One to Run With" by the Allman Brothers Band (1994)
- "Party at the Leper Colony" by "Weird Al" Yankovic (2003)
- "That Big 5-0" by Stan Ridgway (2004)
- "Black Horse and the Cherry Tree" by KT Tunstall (2005)
- "If It's Lovin' that You Want" by Rihanna (2005)
- "At the Bottom of the Ocean" by Ezra Furman (2013)
- "Water Fountain" by Tune-Yards (2014)
- "Fool For Love" by Lord Huron (2015)
- "Bluey Theme Tune" by Joff Bush (2018)

== See also ==
- Clave
- Shave and a Haircut
