= Norma-Jean Wofford =

American guitarist (c.1942–2005)

- Also known as: The Duchess
- Born: c. 1942; Pittsburgh, Pennsylvania
- Died: 30 April 2005 (aged 63) Fontana, California

Norma-Jean Wofford (c. 1942 – April 30, 2005) was an American guitarist who played with Bo Diddley and his band from 1962 to 1966.

Born in Pittsburgh, Pennsylvania, Wofford was Bo Diddley's second female guitarist, replacing Peggy Jones (a.k.a. Lady Bo). When Jones left the band, disappointed fans asked Bo Diddley what had become of her. In response, he hired Wofford, nicknamed her "The Duchess", taught her to play rhythm guitar, and told male admirers that she was his sister. In reality, they were not related. Wofford played guitar and sang alongside Gloria Morgan and Lily "Bee Bee" Jamieson as the Bo-ettes.

Wofford was known for skintight stage clothes, and appeared on several of Bo Diddley's album covers, including Bo Diddley & Company, Bo Diddley's Beach Party, Hey! Good Lookin', 500% More Man and The Originator.

In 1966, Wofford married (becoming Norma-Jean Richardson), and left the band to raise a family in Florida.

== Death and remembrance ==
When Wofford died in Fontana, California in 2005, Bo Diddley stated, "Norma-Jean was my first sidekick... We did everything together. She was like family, which was why I told everyone she was my sister. There was no one else like her and I will miss her very much. I hadn't seen Duchess in so many years, but then she surprised me at a show in California last July. I'm so glad we had the chance to spend some time together again before she left this Earth."

== Discography ==
With Bo Diddley

- Bo Diddley's a Twister (Checker, 1962)
- Bo Diddley & Company (Checker, 1962)
- Bo Diddley's Beach Party (Checker, 1964)
- Hey! Good Lookin' (Checker, 1965)
