= Bo Diddley =

American guitarist and singer (1928–2008)

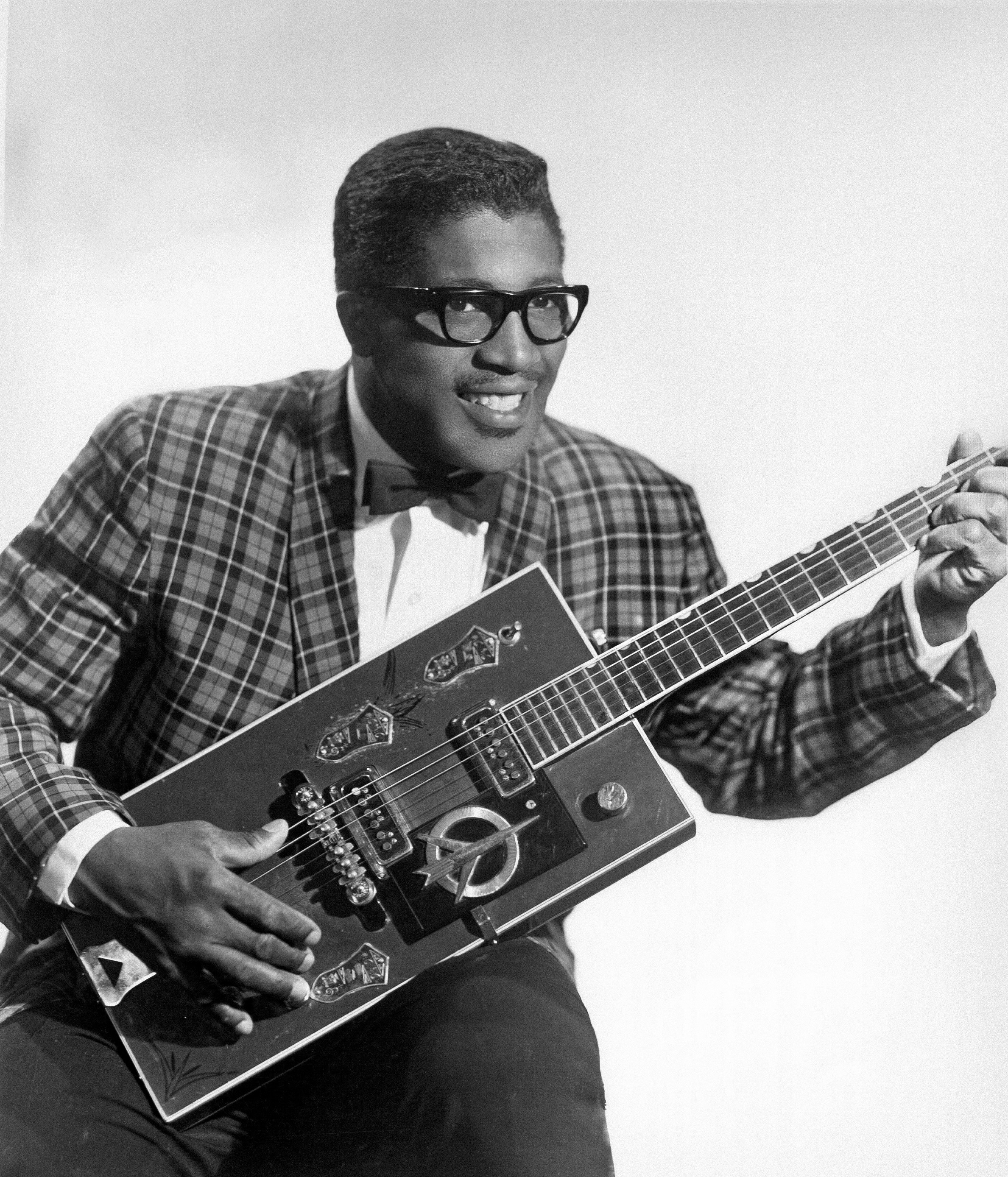
- Diddley in 1957

Background information
- Also known as: Ellas Bates McDaniel; The Originator
- Born: Ellas Otha Bates; December 30, 1928; McComb, Mississippi, U.S.
- Died: June 2, 2008 (aged 79) Archer, Florida, U.S.
- Genres: Rock and roll; blues; psychedelic funk; R&B
- Occupations: Musician; singer; songwriter; guitarist
- Instruments: Guitar; vocals
- Years active: 1943–2008
- Labels: Checker; Chess; RCA; Triple X; Atlantic
- Website: BoDiddley.com

Ellas Otha Bates (December 30, 1928 – June 2, 2008), known professionally as Bo Diddley, was an American guitarist, singer and songwriter who played a key role in the transition from the blues to rock and roll. He influenced many artists, including Buddy Holly, the Beatles, the Rolling Stones, the Animals, George Thorogood, Syd Barrett, Tom Petty, and the Clash.

His use of African and Latin rhythms and a signature beat, a simple five-accent hambone rhythm, is a cornerstone of hip-hop, rock, and pop music. In recognition of his achievements, he was inducted into the Rock and Roll Hall of Fame in 1987, the Blues Hall of Fame in 2003, and the Rhythm and Blues Music Hall of Fame in 2017. He received a Lifetime Achievement Award from the Rhythm and Blues Foundation and the Grammy Lifetime Achievement Award. Diddley is also recognized for his technical innovations, including his use of tremolo and reverb effects to enhance the sound of his distinctive rectangular guitars.

== Early life ==
Bo Diddley was born in McComb, Mississippi, (Note: Some sources give his birthplace as Magnolia, Mississippi, saying that his mother moved to McComb, Mississippi, when he was an infant.) as Ellas Otha Bates (also stated as Otha Ellas Bates or Elias Otha Bates). He was the only child of Ethel Wilson, a sharecropper's teenaged daughter, and Eugene Bates, whom he never knew. Wilson was only sixteen, and being unable to support a family, she gave her cousin, Gussie McDaniel, permission to raise her son. McDaniel eventually adopted him, and he assumed her surname. Diddley denied ever having the name "Otha" in a 2001 interview, saying "My name is not 'Otha'... I don't know where they got that 'Otha' from." The website maintained by his estate states that it was originally part of his birth name.

After his adoptive father Robert died in 1934, when Diddley was five years old, Gussie McDaniel moved with him and her three children to the South Side of Chicago; (Note: Some sources say Gussie McDaniel moved to Chicago in 1935 rather than 1934.) he later dropped Otha from his name and became Ellas McDaniel. He was an active member of Chicago's Ebenezer Missionary Baptist Church, where he studied the trombone and the violin, becoming so proficient on the violin that the musical director invited him to join the orchestra, in which he played until he was 18. However, he was more interested in the joyful, rhythmic music he heard at a local Pentecostal Church and took up the guitar; his first recordings were based on that frenetic church music. Diddley said he thought that the trance-like rhythm he used in his rhythm and blues music came from the Sanctified churches he had attended as a youth in his Chicago neighborhood.

== Career ==
Inspired by a John Lee Hooker performance, Diddley supplemented his income as a carpenter and mechanic by playing on street corners with friends, including Jerome Green, in the Hipsters band, later renamed the Langley Avenue Jive Cats. Green became a near-constant member of McDaniel's backing band, the two often trading joking insults with each other during live shows. In the summers of 1943 and 1944, he played at the Maxwell Street market in a band with Earl Hooker. By 1951 he was playing on the street with backing from Roosevelt Jackson on washtub bass and Jody Williams, who had played harmonica as a boy but took up guitar in his teens after he met Diddley at a talent show, with Diddley teaching him some aspects of playing the instrument, including how to play the bass line. Williams later played lead guitar on "Who Do You Love?" (1956).

In 1951, he landed a regular spot at the 708 Club, on Chicago's South Side, with a repertoire influenced by Louis Jordan, John Lee Hooker, and Muddy Waters. In late 1954, he teamed up with harmonica player Billy Boy Arnold, drummer Clifton James and bass player Roosevelt Jackson and recorded demos of "I'm a Man" and "Bo Diddley". They re-recorded the songs at Universal Recording Corp. for Chess Records, with a backing ensemble comprising Otis Spann (piano), Lester Davenport (harmonica), Frank Kirkland (drums), and Jerome Green (maracas). The record was released in March 1955, and the A-side, "Bo Diddley", became a number one R&B hit.

=== Origins of stage name ===
The origin of the stage name Bo Diddley is unclear. McDaniel said his peers gave him the name, which he suspected was an insult. Diddly is a truncation of diddly squat, which means "absolutely nothing". Diddley also said that the name first belonged to a singer his adoptive mother knew. Harmonicist Billy Boy Arnold said that it was a local comedian's name, which Leonard Chess adopted as McDaniel's stage name and the title of his first single. McDaniel also stated that his school classmates in Chicago gave him the nickname, which he started using when sparring and boxing in the neighborhood with The Little Neighborhood Golden Gloves Bunch.

In the 1921 story "Black Death", by Zora Neale Hurston, Beau Diddely was a womanizer who impregnates a young woman, disavows responsibility, and meets his undoing by the powers of the local hoodoo man. Hurston submitted it in a contest run by the academic journal Opportunity in 1925, where it won an honorable mention, but it was never published during her lifetime.

A diddley bow is a homemade single-string instrument that survived in the American Deep South, especially in Mississippi. Played mainly by children, the diddley bow in its simplest form was made by nailing a length of broom wire to the side of a house, using a rock placed under the string as a movable bridge, and played in the style of a bottleneck guitar, with various objects used as a slider. The apparent consensus among scholars is that the diddley bow is derived from the monochord zithers of central Africa.

=== Success in the 1950s and 1960s ===
On November 20, 1955, Diddley appeared on the popular television program The Ed Sullivan Show. According to legend, when someone on the show's staff overheard him casually singing "Sixteen Tons" in the dressing room, he was asked to perform the song on the show. One of Diddley's later versions of the story was that upon seeing "Bo Diddley" on the cue card, he thought he was to perform both his self-titled hit single and "Sixteen Tons". Sullivan was furious and banned Diddley from his show, reputedly saying that he would not last six months. Chess Records included Diddley's cover of "Sixteen Tons" on the 1963 album Bo Diddley Is a Gunslinger.

Diddley's hit singles continued in the 1950s and 1960s: "Pretty Thing" (1956), "Say Man" (1959), and "You Can't Judge a Book by the Cover" (1962). He also released numerous albums, including Bo Diddley Is a Gunslinger and Have Guitar, Will Travel. These bolstered his self-invented legend. Between 1958 and 1963, Checker Records released eleven full-length Bo Diddley albums. In the 1960s, he broke through as a crossover artist with white audiences (appearing at the Alan Freed concerts, for example), but he rarely aimed his compositions at teenagers. Diddley was among those musicians who capitalized on the mid-1960s surfing and beach party craze in the United States, and released the albums Surfin' with Bo Diddley and Bo Diddley's Beach Party. These featured heavy, distorted blues, played on his Gretsch guitar with bended notes and minor key riffs, unlike the clean, undistorted sounds of the Fender guitars used by the California surf bands. The cover of Surfin' with Bo Diddley had a photograph of two surfers riding a big wave.

In 1963, Diddley starred in a UK concert tour with the The Everly Brothers and Little Richard along with the Rolling Stones (a little-known band at that time).

Diddley wrote many songs for himself and also for others. In 1956, he and guitarist Jody Williams co-wrote the pop song "Love Is Strange", a hit for Mickey & Sylvia in 1957, reaching number 11 on the chart. Mickey Baker claimed that he (Baker) and Bo Diddley's wife, Ethel Smith, wrote the song. Diddley also wrote "Mama (Can I Go Out)", which was a minor hit for the pioneering rockabilly singer Jo Ann Campbell, who performed the song in the 1959 rock and roll film Go, Johnny, Go!.

After moving from Chicago to Washington, D.C., Diddley built his first home recording studio in the basement of his home at 2614 Rhode Island Avenue NE. Frequented by several of Washington, D.C.'s musical luminaries, the studio was the site where he recorded the Checker LP (Checker LP-2977) Bo Diddley Is a Gunslinger. Diddley also produced and recorded several up-and-coming groups from the Washington, D.C. area. One of the first groups he recorded was local doo-wop group the Marquees, featuring Marvin Gaye and baritone-bass Chester Simmons, who moonlighted as Diddley's chauffeur.

The Marquees appeared in talent shows at the Lincoln Theatre, and Diddley, impressed by their smooth vocal delivery, let them rehearse in his studio. Diddley got the Marquees signed to Columbia subsidiary label Okeh Records after unsuccessfully attempting to get them a contract with his own label, Chess. The OKeh label rivaled Chess in the promotion of rhythm and blues. On September 25, 1957, Diddley drove the group to New York City to record "Wyatt Earp", a novelty song written by Reese Palmer, lead singer of the Marquees. Diddley produced the session, with the group backed by his own band. They cut their first record, a single with "Wyatt Earp" on the A-side and "Hey Little School Girl" on the B-side, but it failed to become a hit. Diddley persuaded The Moonglows founder and backing vocalist Harvey Fuqua to hire Gaye. Gaye joined the Moonglows as first tenor; the group then moved to Detroit with the hope of signing with Motown Records founder Berry Gordy Jr.

Diddley included women in his band: Norma-Jean Wofford, also known as The Duchess; Gloria Jolivet; Peggy Jones, also known as Lady Bo, a lead guitarist (rare for a woman at that time); and Cornelia Redmond, also known as Cookie V.

=== Later years ===
In early 1971, writer-musician Michael Lydon, a founding editor of Rolling Stone, conducted a lengthy, rambling interview of Diddley, at his then home in the San Fernando Valley, California. Lydon described him as a "protean genius" whose songs were "hymns to himself", and led the published piece with a Diddley quote: "Everything I know I taught myself."

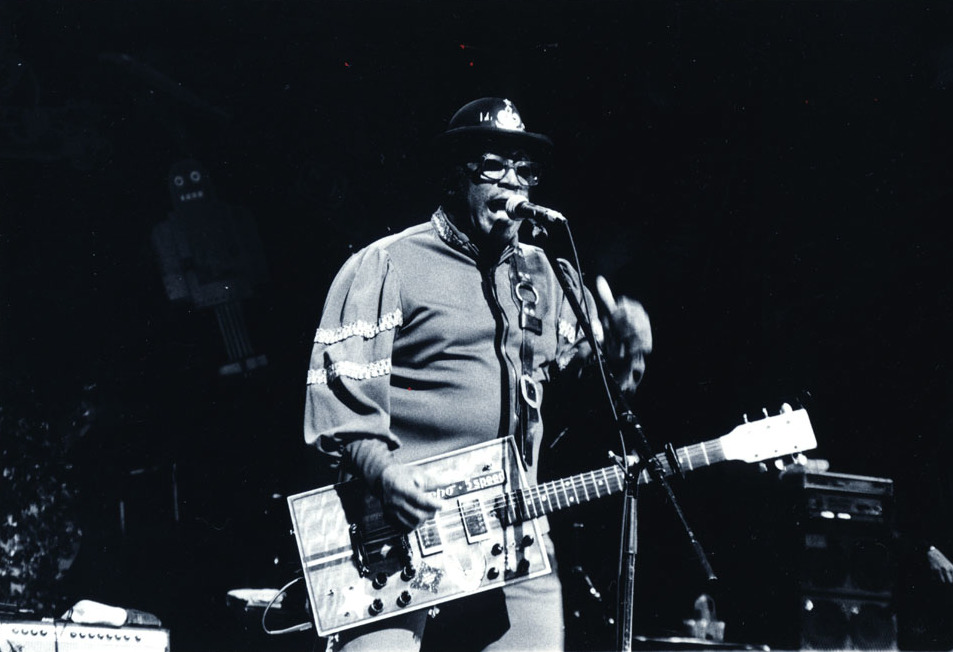
Diddley on tour in Japan with the Japanese band Bo Gumbos

Over the decades, Diddley's performing venues ranged from intimate clubs to stadiums. On March 25, 1972, he played with the Grateful Dead at the Academy of Music in New York City. The Grateful Dead released part of this concert as Volume 30 of the band's concert album series, Dick's Picks. Also in the early 1970s, the soundtrack of the ground-breaking animated film Fritz the Cat contained his song "Bo Diddley", in which a crow dances and finger-pops to the track.

Diddley spent some years in New Mexico, living in Los Lunas from 1971 to 1978, while continuing his musical career. He served for two and a half years as a deputy sheriff in the Valencia County Citizens' Patrol; during that time he purchased and donated three highway-patrol pursuit cars. In the late 1970s, he left Los Lunas and moved to Hawthorne, Florida, where he lived on a large estate in a custom-made log cabin, which he helped to build. For the remainder of his life he divided his time between Albuquerque and Florida, living the last 13 years of his life in Archer, Florida, a small farming town near Gainesville.

In 1979, he appeared as an opening act for the Clash on their US tour.

In 1983, he made a cameo appearance as a Philadelphia pawn shop owner in the comedy film Trading Places. He also appeared in George Thorogood's music video for the song "Bad to the Bone," portraying a guitar-slinging pool shark.

In 1985, he appeared on George Thorogood's set, alongside fellow blues legend Albert Collins, on the Live Aid American stage to perform Thorogood's popular cover of Diddley's song Who Do You Love?".

In 1989, Diddley and his management company, Talent Source, entered into a licensing with the sportswear brand, Nike. The Wieden & Kennedy-produced commercial in the "Bo Knows" campaign teamed Diddley with dual sportsman Bo Jackson. The agreement ended in 1991, but in 1999, a T-shirt of Diddley's image and "You don't know diddley" slogan was purchased in a Gainesville, Florida, sports apparel store. Diddley felt that Nike should not continue to use the slogan or his likeness and fought Nike over the copyright infringement. Despite the fact that lawyers for both parties could not come to a renewed legal arrangement, Nike allegedly continued marketing the apparel and ignored cease-and-desist orders, and a lawsuit was filed on Diddley's behalf, in Manhattan Federal Court.

Diddley played a blues and rock musician named Axman in the 1990 comedy film Rockula, directed by Luca Bercovici and starring Dean Cameron.

In Legends of Guitar (filmed live in Spain in 1991), Diddley performed with Steve Cropper, B.B. King, Les Paul, Albert Collins, and George Benson, among others. He joined the Rolling Stones on their 1994 concert broadcast of Voodoo Lounge, performing "Who Do You Love?" at Joe Robbie Stadium, in Miami.

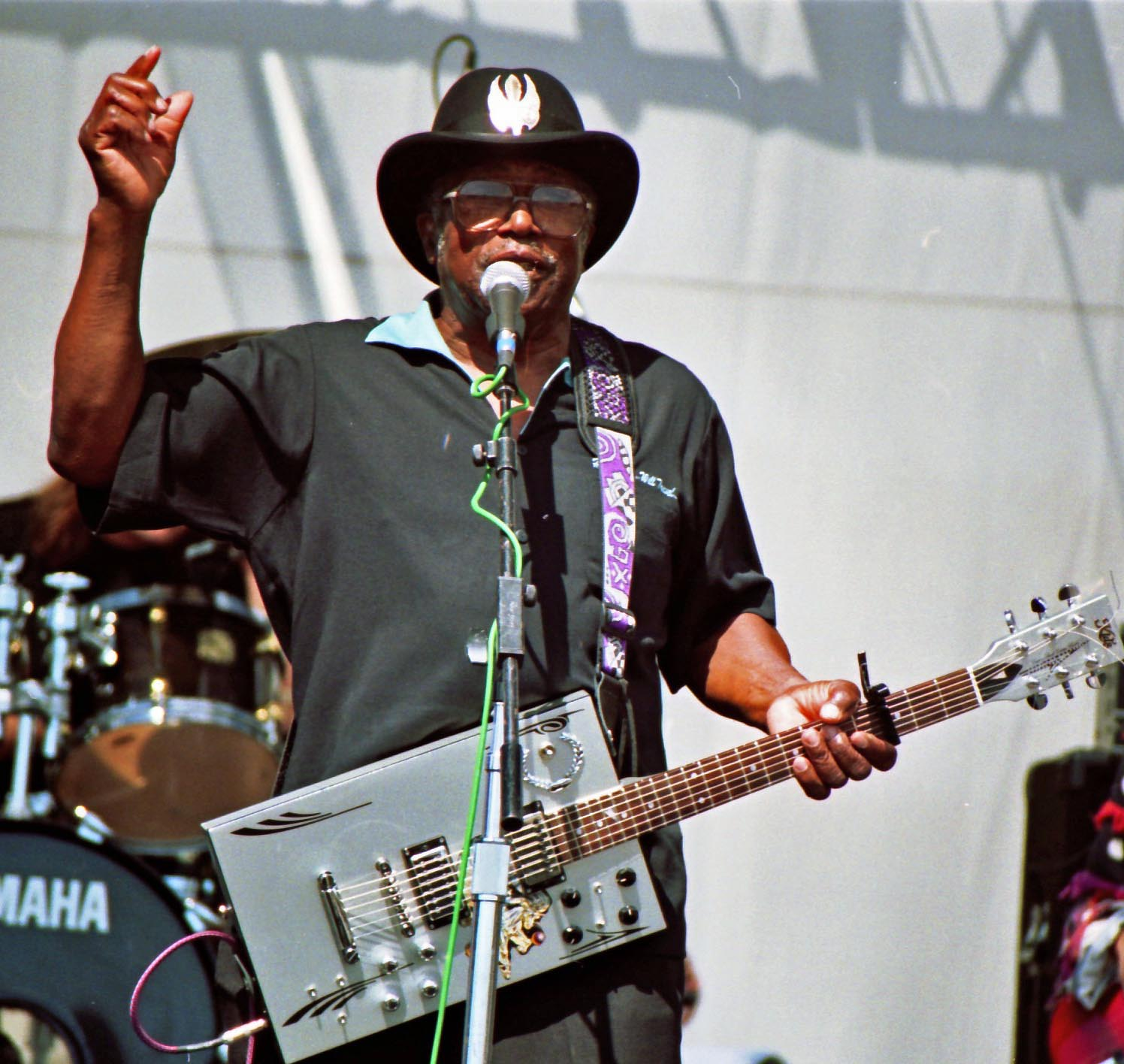
Bo Diddley at the Long Beach Jazz Festival, 1997 with drummer Dave Johnson

In 1996, he released A Man Amongst Men, his first major-label album (and his final studio album) with guest artists like Keith Richards, Ron Wood and The Shirelles. The album earned a Grammy Award nomination in 1997 for the Best Contemporary Blues Album category.

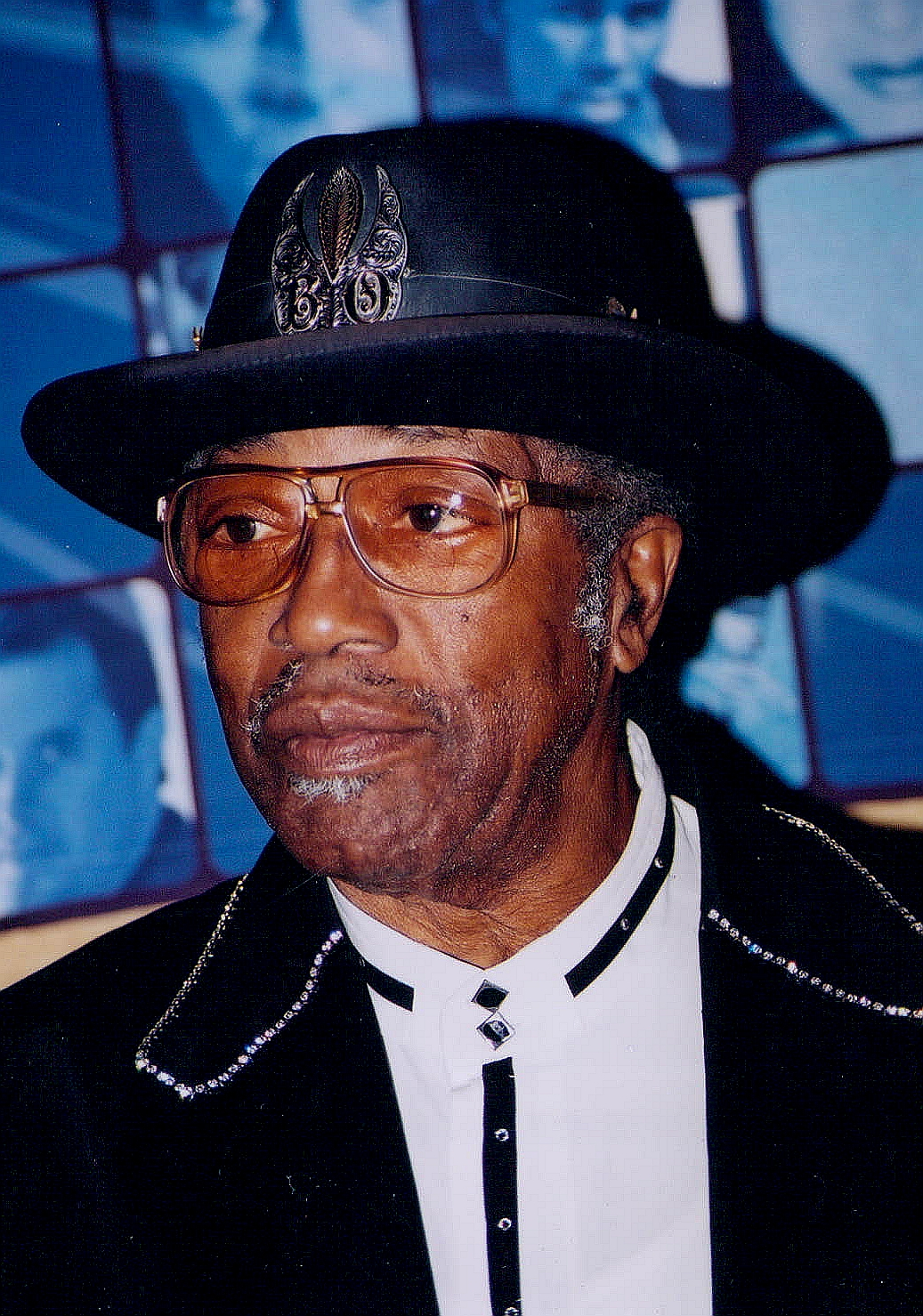
Bo Diddley in 2002

Diddley performed a number of shows around the country in 2005 and 2006, with fellow Rock and Roll Hall of Famer Johnnie Johnson and his band, consisting of Johnson on keyboards, Richard Hunt on drums and Gus Thornton on bass. In 2006, he participated as the headliner of a grassroots-organized fundraiser concert to benefit the town of Ocean Springs, Mississippi, which had been devastated by Hurricane Katrina. The "Florida Keys for Katrina Relief" had originally been set for October 23, 2005, when Hurricane Wilma barreled through the Florida Keys on October 24, causing flooding and economic mayhem.

In January 2006, the Florida Keys had recovered enough to host the fundraising concert to benefit the more hard-hit community of Ocean Springs. When asked about the fundraiser, Diddley stated, "This is the United States of America. We believe in helping one another". The all-star band included members of the Soul Providers, and famed artists Clarence Clemons of the E Street Band, Joey Covington of Jefferson Airplane, Alfonso Carey of The Village People, and Carl Spagnuolo of Jay & The Techniques. In an interview with Holger Petersen, on Saturday Night Blues on CBC Radio in the fall of 2006, he commented on racism in the music industry establishment during his early career. Diddley sold the rights to his songs early on, and until 1989 he received no royalties from the most successful part of his career.

His final guitar performance on a studio album was with the New York Dolls on their 2006 album One Day It Will Please Us to Remember Even This. He contributed guitar work to the song "Seventeen", which was included as a bonus track on the limited-edition version of the disc.

In May 2007, Diddley suffered a stroke after a concert the previous day in Council Bluffs, Iowa. Nonetheless, he delivered an energetic performance to an enthusiastic crowd. A few months later he had a heart attack. While recovering, Diddley came back to his hometown of McComb, Mississippi, in early November 2007, for the unveiling of a plaque devoted to him on the Mississippi Blues Trail. This marked his achievements and noted that he was "acclaimed as a founder of rock-and-roll." He was not supposed to perform, but as he listened to the music of local musician Jesse Robinson, who sang a song written for this occasion, Robinson sensed that Diddley wanted to perform and handed him a microphone, the only time that he performed publicly after his stroke.

== Personal life ==
=== Marriages and children ===
Bo Diddley was married four times. His first marriage, at 18, to Louise Willingham, lasted a year. Diddley married his second wife Ethel Mae Smith in 1949; they had two children. He met his third wife, Kay Reynolds, when she was 15, while performing in Birmingham, Alabama. They soon moved in together and married, despite taboos against interracial marriage. They had two daughters. He married his fourth wife, Sylvia Paiz, in 1992; they were divorced at the time of his death.

=== Health problems ===
On May 13, 2007, Diddley was admitted to intensive care in Creighton University Medical Center in Omaha, Nebraska, following a stroke after a concert the previous day in Council Bluffs, Iowa. Starting the show, he had complained that he did not feel well and attributed the problem to smoke from large wildfires that clouded the air in his hometown of Archer, Florida. The next day, as he was heading back home, Diddley seemed dazed and confused at the airport. Someone telephoned 911 on his behalf, and he was immediately taken by ambulance to Creighton University Medical Center where he stayed for several days. Diddley was then flown to Shands Hospital in Gainesville where it was confirmed that he had suffered a stroke. Diddley had a history of hypertension and diabetes, and the stroke affected the left side of his brain, causing receptive and expressive aphasia (speech impairment). The stroke was followed by a heart attack, which he suffered in Gainesville on August 28, 2007.

== Death ==
Bo Diddley died on June 2, 2008, of heart failure at his home in Archer, Florida, at the age of 79. Many family members were with him when he died at 1:45 am. EDT at his home. His death was expected "There was a Gospel song that was sung, at his bedside, and when it was done, he opened his eyes, gave a thumbs up, and said, 'Wow! I'm goin' to Heaven!' The song was 'Walk Around Heaven', and those were his last words."

He was survived by his children, Evelyn Kelly, Ellas A. McDaniel, Pamela Jacobs, Steven Jones, Terri Lynn McDaniel-Hines, and Tammi D. McDaniel; a brother, the Rev. Kenneth Haynes; and eighteen grandchildren, fifteen great-grandchildren and three great-great-grandchildren.

Diddley's funeral, a four-hour "homegoing" service, took place on June 7, 2008, at Showers of Blessings Church in Gainesville, Florida. Many in attendance chanted "Hey Bo Diddley" as members of his band played a subdued version of the song.

A number of notable musicians sent flowers, including Little Richard, George Thorogood, Tom Petty and Jerry Lee Lewis. Little Richard, who had been asking his audiences to pray for Bo Diddley, throughout his illness, had to fulfill concert commitments in Westbury and New York City, the weekend of the funeral. He remembered Diddley at the concerts, performing his namesake tune. Eric Burdon of the Animals flew to Gainesville to attend the service.

After the funeral service, a tribute concert was held at the Martin Luther King Center in Gainesville, featuring guest performances by his son and daughter, Ellas A. McDaniel and Evelyn "Tan" Cooper; long-time background vocalist (and original Boette), Gloria Jolivet, and long-time bassist and bandleader, Debby Hastings, Eric Burdon, and former Bo Diddley & Offspring guitarist, Scott Free. In the days following his death, tributes were paid by then-President George W. Bush, the United States House of Representatives, and musicians and performers including B. B. King, Ronnie Hawkins, Mick Jagger, Ronnie Wood, George Thorogood, Eric Clapton, Tom Petty, Robert Plant, Elvis Costello, Bonnie Raitt, Robert Randolph and the Family Band and Eric Burdon. Burdon used video footage of the McDaniel family, and friends in mourning, for a video promoting his ABKCO Records release "Bo Diddley Special". Hastings is quoted as having said, "He was the rock that the roll was built on."

In November 2009, the guitar used by Bo Diddley in his final stage performance sold for $60,000 at auction.

In 2019, members of Bo Diddley's family sued to regain control of the music catalog held in trust by attorney Charles Littell. The family was successful in appointing a new trustee, music industry veteran Kendall Minter. The family was represented by Charles David of Florida Probate Law Group in the 2019 lawsuit.

== Accolades ==
Bo Diddley was posthumously awarded a Doctor of Fine Arts degree by the University of Florida for his influence on American popular music. In its People in America radio series, about influential people in American history, the Voice of America radio service paid tribute to him, describing how "his influence was so widespread that it is hard to imagine what rock and roll would have sounded like without him." Mick Jagger stated that "he was a wonderful, original musician who was an enormous force in music and was a big influence on the Rolling Stones. He was very generous to us in our early years and we learned a lot from him". Jagger also praised the late star as a one-of-a-kind musician, adding, "We will never see his like again". The documentary film Cheat You Fair: The Story of Maxwell Street by director Phil Ranstrom features Bo Diddley's last on-camera interview.

He achieved numerous accolades in recognition of his significant role as one of the founding fathers of rock and roll.

- 1986: Inducted into the Washington Area Music Association's Hall of Fame.
- 1987: Inducted into the Rock and Roll Hall of Fame
- 1987: Inducted into the Rockabilly Hall of Fame
- 1990: Lifetime Achievement Award from Guitar Player magazine
- 1996: Lifetime Achievement Award from the Rhythm and Blues Foundation
- 1998: Grammy Lifetime Achievement Award
- 1999: His 1955 recording of his song "Bo Diddley" inducted into the Grammy Hall of Fame
- 2000: Inducted into the Mississippi Musicians Hall of Fame
- 2000: Inducted into the North Florida Music Association's Hall of Fame
- 2002: Pioneer in Entertainment Award from the National Association of Black Owned Broadcasters
- 2002: Honored as one of the first BMI Icons at the 50th annual BMI Pop Awards, along with BMI affiliates Chuck Berry and Little Richard.
- 2003: Inducted into the Blues Hall of Fame
- 2008: Honorary Doctor of Fine Arts degree posthumously conferred on Diddley by the University of Florida in August (the award had been confirmed before his death in June).
- 2020: Induction into the Florida Artists Hall of Fame
- 2010: Induction into the Hit Parade Hall of Fame.
- 2017: Inducted into the Rhythm and Blues Music Hall of Fame.
- 2021: Inducted into the New Mexico Music Hall of Fame.

In 2003, U.S. Representative John Conyers paid tribute to Bo Diddley in the United States House of Representatives, describing him as "one of the true pioneers of rock and roll, who has influenced generations".

In 2004, Mickey & Sylvia's 1956 recording of "Love Is Strange" (a song first recorded by Bo Diddley but not released until a year before his death) was inducted into the Grammy Hall of Fame as a recording of qualitative or historical significance. Also in 2004, Bo Diddley was inducted into the Blues Foundation's Blues Hall of Fame and was ranked number 20 on Rolling Stone magazine's list of the 100 Greatest Artists of All Time.

In 2005, Bo Diddley celebrated his 50th anniversary in music with successful tours of Australia and Europe and with coast-to-coast shows across North America. He performed his song "Bo Diddley" with Eric Clapton and Robbie Robertson at the Rock and Roll Hall of Fame's 20th annual induction ceremony. In the UK, Uncut magazine included his 1957 debut album, Bo Diddley, in its listing of the '100 Music, Movie & TV Moments That Have Changed the World'.

Bo Diddley was honored by the Mississippi Blues Commission with a Mississippi Blues Trail historic marker placed in McComb, his birthplace, in recognition of his enormous contribution to the development of the blues in Mississippi. On June 5, 2009, the city of Gainesville, Florida, officially renamed and dedicated its downtown plaza the Bo Diddley Community Plaza. The plaza was the site of a benefit concert at which Bo Diddley performed to raise awareness about the plight of the homeless in Alachua County and to raise money for local charities, including the Red Cross.

== Beat ==
The "Bo Diddley beat" is essentially the clave rhythm, one of the most common bell patterns found in sub-Saharan African music traditions. One scholar found this rhythm in 13 rhythm and blues recordings made in the years 1944–55, including two by Johnny Otis from 1948.

Bo Diddley gave different accounts of how he began to use this rhythm. Ned Sublette says, "In the context of the time, and especially those maracas [heard on the record], 'Bo Diddley' has to be understood as a Latin-tinged record. A rejected cut recorded at the same session was titled only 'Rhumba' on the track sheets." The Bo Diddley beat is similar to "hambone", a style used by street performers who play out the beat by slapping and patting their arms, legs, chest, and cheeks while chanting rhymes. Somewhat resembling the "shave and a haircut, two bits" rhythm, Diddley came across it while trying to play Gene Autry's "(I've Got Spurs That) Jingle, Jangle, Jingle". Three years before his "Bo Diddley", a song with similar syncopation titled "Hambone" was cut by the Red Saunders Orchestra with the Hambone Kids. In 1944, "Rum and Coca Cola", containing the Bo Diddley beat, was recorded by the Andrews Sisters. Many recordings after Diddley’s successes, such as Buddy Holly's "Not Fade Away" (1957) and Them's "Mystic Eyes" (1965) used the beat.

"Bo Diddley beat"/Son clave.

In its simplest form, the Bo Diddley beat can be counted out as either a one-bar or a two-bar phrase. Here is the count as a one-bar phrase: One e and ah, two e and ah, three e and ah, four e and ah (the boldface counts are the clave rhythm).

Many songs (for example, "Hey Bo Diddley" and "Who Do You Love?") often have no chord changes; that is, the musicians play the same chord throughout the piece, so that the rhythms create the excitement, rather than having the excitement generated by harmonic tension and release. In his other recordings, Bo Diddley used various rhythms, from straight back beat to pop ballad style to doo-wop, frequently with maracas by Jerome Green. His 1955 rhythm and blues hit, "Bo Diddley", had a "driving African rhythm and ham-bone beat". Beginning that same year, Diddley collaborated with various doo-wop vocal groups, using the Moonglows as a backing group on his first album, Bo Diddley, released in 1958. In one of the most well-known of his 1958 doo-wop sessions, Diddley added harmonies by the Carnations recording as the Teardrops, who sang smooth, polished doo-wop in the backgrounds on the songs "I'm Sorry", "Crackin' Up", and "Don't Let it Go".

An influential guitar player, Bo Diddley developed many special effects and other innovations in tone and attack, particularly the "shimmering" tremolo sound, and amp reverb. His trademark instrument was his self-designed, one-of-a-kind, rectangular-bodied "Twang Machine" (referred to as "cigar-box shaped" by music promoter Dick Clark), built by Gretsch. He had other uniquely shaped guitars custom-made for him by other manufacturers throughout the years, most notably the "Cadillac" and the rectangular "Turbo 5-speed" (with built-in envelope filter, flanger and delay) designs, made by Tom Holmes (who also made guitars for ZZ Top's Billy Gibbons, among others). In a 2005 interview on JJJ radio in Australia, he implied that the rectangular design sprang from an embarrassing moment. During an early gig, while jumping around on stage with a Gibson L5 guitar, he landed awkwardly, hurting his groin. He then went about designing a smaller, less-restrictive guitar that allowed him to keep jumping around on stage while still playing his guitar. He also played the violin, which is featured on his mournful instrumental "The Clock Strikes Twelve", a twelve-bar blues.

Diddley often created lyrics as witty and humorous adaptations of folk music themes. His first hit, "Bo Diddley", was based on hambone rhymes. The first line of his song "Hey Bo Diddley" is derived from the nursery rhyme "Old MacDonald". The song "Who Do You Love?" with its rap-style boasting, and his use of the African-American game known as "the dozens" on the songs "Say Man" and "Say Man, Back Again," are cited as progenitors of hip-hop music; for example, in the dialogue of the song, "Say Man", percussionist Jerome Green says the lines: "You've got the nerve to call somebody ugly. Why, you so ugly that the stork that brought you in the world oughta be arrested."

== Discography ==
I used to get mad about people recording my things; now I got a new thing going ... I don't get mad about them recording my material because they keep me alive.

— Bo Diddley, 1969 Pop Chronicles interview

=== Studio albums ===
- Bo Diddley (Checker, 1958)
- Go Bo Diddley (Checker, 1959)
- Have Guitar Will Travel (Checker, 1960)
- Bo Diddley in the Spotlight (Checker, 1960)
- Bo Diddley Is a Gunslinger (Checker, 1960)
- Bo Diddley Is a Lover (Checker, 1961)
- Bo Diddley's a Twister (Checker, 1962)
- Bo Diddley (Checker, 1962)
- Bo Diddley & Company (Checker, 1963)
- Surfin' with Bo Diddley (Checker, 1963)
- Hey! Good Lookin' (Checker, 1965)
- 500% More Man (Checker, 1965)
- The Originator (Checker, 1966)
- The Black Gladiator (Checker, 1970)
- Another Dimension (Chess, 1971)
- Where It All Began (Chess, 1972)
- The London Bo Diddley Sessions (Chess, 1973)
- Big Bad Bo (Chess, 1974)
- 20th Anniversary of Rock 'n' Roll (RCA Victor, 1976)
- Ain't It Good to Be Free (New Rose, 1983)
- Living Legend (New Rose, 1989)
- Breakin' Through the B.S. (Triple X, 1989)
- This Should Not Be (Triple X, 1992)
- A Man Amongst Men (Atlantic, 1996)

=== Collaborations ===
- Two Great Guitars, with Chuck Berry (Checker, 1964)
- Super Blues, with Muddy Waters and Little Walter (Checker, 1967)
- The Super Super Blues Band, with Muddy Waters and Howlin' Wolf (Checker, 1968)

=== Chart singles ===
Year	Single	Chart Positions		
Year	Single	US Pop	US R&B	UK
1955	"Bo Diddley" / "I'm a Man"	-	1	-
1955	"Diddley Daddy"	-	11	-
1956	"Pretty Thing"	–	4	34 (in 1963)
1959	"I'm Sorry"	–	17	–
1959	"Crackin Up"	62	14	–
1959	"Say Man"	20	3	–
1959	"Say Man, Back Again"	–	23	–
1960	"Road Runner"	75	20	–
1962	"You Can't Judge a Book by the Cover"	48	21	–
1965	"Hey Good Lookin'"	–	–	39
1967	"Ooh Baby"	88	17	–

== Books ==
- Arsicaud, Laurent (2012). Bo Diddley, Je suis un homme. Camion Blanc editions.
- White, George R. (2001). Bo Diddley: Living Legend. Sanctuary Publishing Ltd. ISBN 9781860742927.
