= Checker Records =

American record label

- Founded: 1952
- Founder: Leonard Chess; Phil Chess
- Defunct: 1971
- Genre: Blues; rhythm and blues; doo-wop; gospel; rock and roll; soul
- Country of origin: United States
- Location: Chicago, Illinois

Checker Records is a defunct record label that was started in 1952 as a subsidiary of Chess Records in Chicago, Illinois. The label was founded by the Chess brothers, Leonard and Phil, who ran the label until they sold it to General Recorded Tape (GRT) in 1969, shortly before Leonard's death.

The label released recordings by mostly African American artists and groups. Checker's releases cover a wide range of genres including blues (Little Walter, Sonny Boy Williamson II), rhythm and blues (Sax Mallard, Jimmy McCracklin), doo-wop (The Flamingos, The Moonglows, The Students), gospel (Aretha Franklin, Five Blind Boys of Mississippi), rock and roll (Bo Diddley, Dale Hawkins), and soul (Gene Chandler).

The label was discontinued in 1971 following GRT's consolidation of the Chess catalogs. As with Cadet and Chess, the label's catalog is now owned by Universal Music Group and releases from the Checker catalog are released by Geffen Records and Chess.

== History ==
Due to the recent expansion of Chess Records, as well as to achieve greater airplay for singles, the Chess brothers opened up a subsidiary label named Checker. The first 45/78 rpm single released by the label was "Slow Caboose" b/w "Darling, Let's Give Love a Chance" by Sax Mallard and his Orchestra, which was released as Checker 750 in April 1952.

The label's most popular artist, in the label's early years, was Little Walter, who had ten songs released by Checker that made the Top Ten of Billboard magazine's Top Rhythm & Blues Records charts. Among those ten was "Juke" which topped the charts and was inducted into the Grammy Hall of Fame in 2008.

Checker released several singles by well-established blues artists such as Elmore James, Arthur "Big Boy" Crudup (credited as Perry Lee Crudup), and Memphis Minnie, none of which sold well. One well-established blues artist that did manage to make a hit on Checker was Sonny Boy Williamson II, who charted with "Don't Start Me Talkin'" (number 3) in 1955, "Keep It to Yourself" (number 14) in 1956, and "Help Me" (number 24) in 1963.

On March 2, 1955, the Chess brothers recorded their first rock and roll artist, Bo Diddley. From this session came Bo's self-titled debut single on Checker, which topped the R&B charts and was inducted into the Grammy Hall of Fame in 1998. Another one of Bo Diddley's Checker singles, "Who Do You Love?", was inducted in 2010. In 1957, Checker cracked into the rockabilly market with Dale Hawkins, who had a crossover hit with "Susie Q", although he could not repeat the single's success.

In 1958, Checker released its first 12" 33⅓ rpm LP record, The Best of Little Walter, which was released as Checker LP-1428.

== Discography ==
The original Checker LP series started with six albums released as part of the Chess 1425 album series before switching to the 2970 series in 1959 and continued until 1970.

Catalog No.	Album	Artist	Details
LP-1428	The Best of Little Walter	Little Walter	
LP-1429	Oh! Suzy-Q	Dale Hawkins	
LP-1431	Bo Diddley	Bo Diddley	
LP-1433	The Flamingos	The Flamingos	
LP-1436	Go Bo Diddley	Bo Diddley	
LP-1437	Down and Out Blues	Sonny Boy Williamson	
LP-2971	Keeping Tab	Tab Smith	
LP-2973	Love Those Goodies	Various Artists	
LP-2974	Have Guitar Will Travel	Bo Diddley	
LP-2975	Hits That Jumped	Various Artists	
LP-2976	Bo Diddley in the Spotlight	Bo Diddley	
LP-2977	Bo Diddley Is a Gunslinger	Bo Diddley	
LP-2978	Watusi!	The Vibrations	
LP-2979	Sugar Pie DeSanto	Sugar Pie DeSanto	
LP-2980	Bo Diddley Is a Lover	Bo Diddley	
LP-2981	Twist with Steve Alaimo	Steve Alaimo	
LP-2982	Bo Diddley's a Twister	Bo Diddley	
LP-2983	Mashed Potatoes	Steve Alaimo	
LP-2984	Bo Diddley	Bo Diddley	
LP-2985	Bo Diddley & Company	Bo Diddley	
LP-2986	Every Day I Have to Cry	Steve Alaimo	
LP-2987	Surfin' with Bo Diddley	Bo Diddley	
LP-2988	Bo Diddley's Beach Party	Bo Diddley	
LP-2989	Bo Diddley's 16 All Time Greatest Hits	Bo Diddley	
LP-2990	Hi-Heel Sneakers	Tommy Tucker	
LP/LPS-2991	Two Great Guitars	Bo Diddley and Chuck Berry	
LP-2992	Hey Good Lookin'	Bo Diddley	
LP-2993	Hold On! It's Joe Tex	Joe Tex	
LP/LPS-2994	Dance with Daddy "G"	Gene Barge	
LP/LPS-2995	We're Gonna Make It	Little Milton	
LP/LPS-2996	500% More Man	Bo Diddley	
LP/LPS-2997	The "New" Look	Fontella Bass	
LP/LPS-2998	Sing a Song of Soul	Various Artists	
LP/LPS-3000	Searching for My Love	Bobby Moore & the Rhythm Aces	
LP/LPS-3001	The Originator	Bo Diddley	
LP/LPS-3002	Little Milton Sings Big Blues	Little Milton	
LP/LPS-3003	The Duke of Soul	Gene Chandler	
LP-3004	The Best of Little Walter	Little Walter	reissue of Checker LP-1428
LPS-3005	The Flamingos	The Flamingos	reissue of Checker LP-1433
LP-3006	Go Bo Diddley	Bo Diddley	reissue of Checker LP-1436
LP-3007	Boss Man	Bo Diddley	reissue of Checker LP-1431
LP/LPS-3008	Super Blues	Bo Diddley, Muddy Waters, and Little Walter	
LP/LPS-3010	The Super Super Blues Band	Howlin' Wolf, Muddy Waters and Bo Diddley	
LPS-3011	Grits Ain't Groceries	Little Milton	
LPS-3012	If Walls Could Talk	Little Milton	
LPS-3013	The Black Gladiator	Bo Diddley	
LPS-3014	In the Beginning...	Various Artists	
LPS-3015	Hot Wheels	Stan Farlow	
LPS-3016	Born to Love Me	Jimmy Reeves Jr.	
CK-3017	The Prayer	Ray Scott	

== See also ==
- List of record labels
- Checker Records albums
- Checker Records singles
