= Bo Diddley (Bo Diddley song) =

1955 song by Bo Diddley

- Reissue picture sleeve

Single by Bo Diddley
- B-side: "I'm a Man"
- Released: April 1955
- Recorded: Chicago, March 2, 1955
- Genre: Rock and roll; rhythm and blues
- Length: 2:28
- Label: Checker
- Songwriter: Ellas McDaniel a.k.a. Bo Diddley
- Producers: Leonard Chess, Phil Chess, Bo Diddley

Bo Diddley singles chronology
"Bo Diddley" (1955)	"Diddley Daddy" (1955)

Audio sample
- file; help

"Bo Diddley" is a song by American rock and roll pioneer Bo Diddley. It introduced the rhythm that became known as the Bo Diddley beat and topped the Billboard R&B chart for two weeks in 1955. The song is included on many of Diddley's compilation albums including Bo Diddley (1958) and His Best (1997). Buddy Holly recorded a version that posthumously became a #4 hit in the UK.

== Composition and recording ==
The song is rhythmically similar to hambone, a technique of dancing and slapping various parts of the body to create a rhythm and song. Diddley's electric guitar along with his backup musicians on maracas and drums contributed to the patted juba rhythm. This fusion of rock and roll, African rhythms, and guitar was a breakthrough and became known as the Bo Diddley Beat. Lyrically, it is similar to the traditional lullaby "Hush Little Baby".

"Bo Diddley" was recorded in Chicago at his first formal session for Leonard Chess on March 2, 1955. Diddley, on guitar and vocals, was accompanied by Frank Kirkland on drums, Jerome Green on maracas, and Billy Boy Arnold on harmonica.

== Charts and recognition ==
Checker Records released "Bo Diddley" as a single with "I'm a Man" in April 1955. The song spent two weeks at No. 1 on the Billboard R&B chart, eventually becoming the tenth best-selling single of 1955 on the chart.

Music critic Richie Unterberger described the song as:

soaked with futuristic waves of tremolo guitar, set to an ageless nursery rhyme ... The result was not exactly blues, or even straight R&B, but a new kind of guitar-based rock 'n' roll, soaked in the blues and R&B, but owing allegiance to neither.

In 1998, "Bo Diddley" received a Grammy Hall of Fame Award and it is included on the Rock and Roll Hall of Fame's list of "500 Songs that Shaped Rock and Roll". In 2011, the A and B-side pair were added to the Library of Congress's National Recording Registry list of "culturally, historically, or aesthetically important" American sound recordings. In 2017, the single was inducted in to the Blues Hall of Fame. Rolling Stone ranked the song at No. 277 on its 2021 list of the "500 Greatest Songs of All Time", down from No. 62 on its 2004 list.

== Buddy Holly version ==
"Bo Diddley"

Single by Buddy Holly

from the album Reminiscing
- B-side: "It's Not My Fault"
- Released: 1963
- Recorded: 1956 and 1962 (overdubs)
- Studio: Norman Petty Recording Studios (Clovis, New Mexico)
- Genre: Rock and roll; rockabilly
- Length: 2:23
- Label: Coral
- Songwriter: Ellas McDaniel a.k.a. Bo Diddley
- Producer: Norman Petty

Buddy Holly singles chronology
"Brown Eyed Handsome Man" (1963)	"Bo Diddley" (1963)	"Wishing" (1963)

Buddy Holly recorded the song in 1956, but it was not released until 1963, when it was included on the Reminiscing album and later became a single.

Holly, on vocals and guitar, accompanied by Jerry Allison on drums recorded "Bo Diddley" at one of their earliest sessions with producer and engineer Norman Petty at his recording studio in Clovis, New Mexico, sometime in 1956. In 1962, Norman Petty overdubbed the demo of "Bo Diddley", as well as other tracks, with the Fireballs.

The single release was one of Holly's highest-charting singles on the UK Singles Chart, reaching No. 4 on the week of July 10, 1963, spending a total of 12 weeks on the chart. In the U.S., the song reached No. 116 on Billboard magazine's Bubbling Under Hot 100 Singles chart.

== In popular culture ==
- Bo Diddley's recording of Bo Diddley is used in Ralph Bakshi's Fritz the Cat (1972), during a transition scene where a black crow is snapping along with the beat. The recording was also included on the official soundtrack.
