= Jerome Green =

American percussionist (c. 1934 – c. 1973)

- Born: c. 1934
- Origin: Chicago, U.S.
- Died: c. 1973
- Genres: R&B
- Occupations: Percussionist; lyricist; singer
- Instruments: Maracas; vocals
- Years active: c. 1950–1964
- Label: Chess

Jerome Green (c. 1934 – c. 1973) was an American percussionist, lyricist and singer, known for playing maracas and acting as Bo Diddley's foil in his performances and on his recordings in the 1950s and early 1960s.

== Biography ==
Green grew up in Chicago, and was a neighbor of Ellas McDaniel, later known as Bo Diddley, who was older by a few years. According to some sources, Green played tuba, but, when Bo Diddley performed on street corners and outside theaters from about 1950, he used Green to collect money from bystanders. Needing to add percussion to boost his sound, but not wanting to have to carry a drum kit between venues, he recruited Green to play maracas, which he made out of toilet floats filled with dried black-eyed peas.

Bo Diddley said: "I taught Jerome how to play those maracas... They gave.. the unique sound, that jungle-type rhythm feel..". Referring to himself, Green, and bassist Roosevelt Jackson, he commented: "We used to be three dudes going down the street with a washtub, a little raggedy guitar and another cat with maracas... We would go into the club and we would stand right by the front door because we weren’t old enough to be in there. We would play for people and pass the hat....".

When Bo Diddley first recorded for Chess Records in March 1955, Green played maracas on the songs "I'm a Man" and "Bo Diddley". The record reached number 1 on the Billboard R&B chart. Green continued to perform as a member of Bo Diddley's band, in performances and on recordings, and toured with him until the early 1960s. He also played maracas on Chess label recordings by Chuck Berry – including his first recording, "Maybellene" – Billy Boy Arnold, Billy Stewart, and Willie Dixon, among others.

Green also contributed lyrics and vocals to some of Bo Diddley's recordings. He is credited with writing "Bring It to Jerome", the B-side of Bo Diddley's third single, "Pretty Thing", on which he and Bo Diddley shared vocals. On "Say Man", which became Bo Diddley's biggest chart hit in 1959 and which was edited from a jam session in the recording studio, he and Green traded insults in the style of the word game known as the Dozens. Writer Elijah Wald commented: "Although they didn't mention mothers, it was otherwise a typical street corner exchange, starting with jokes about each other's girlfriends and moving on to personal signifying".

Green's performances on maracas, often using two or more in each hand, were an influence on 1960s British R&B groups including the Rolling Stones, the Pretty Things, the Animals (who mentioned Green in their 1964 song "Story of Bo Diddley", and in 1965's Club A-GO-GO), Them, and Manfred Mann, all of whom incorporated the use of maracas in their shows. On the Rolling Stones' first British tour in 1963, when they supported Bo Diddley and the Everly Brothers, Keith Richards took on the role of Green's "minder". In his autobiography, Life, Richards said: "I took over the job of being Jerome's roadie for some reason. We liked each other a lot, and he was great fun... There'd be this cry backstage, Anyone seen Jerome? And I'd say, I bet I know where he is. He'll be in the nearest pub from backstage.... I'd zip round to the pub nearest to the backstage and there'd be Jerome and he'd be talking to the locals and they'd all be buying him drinks because they didn't often meet a six-foot black man from Chicago...".

Green played and recorded with Bo Diddley until late 1964, when he married and decided to cease performing. He died in or around 1973, according to some sources in New York City.
