= Scarface discography =

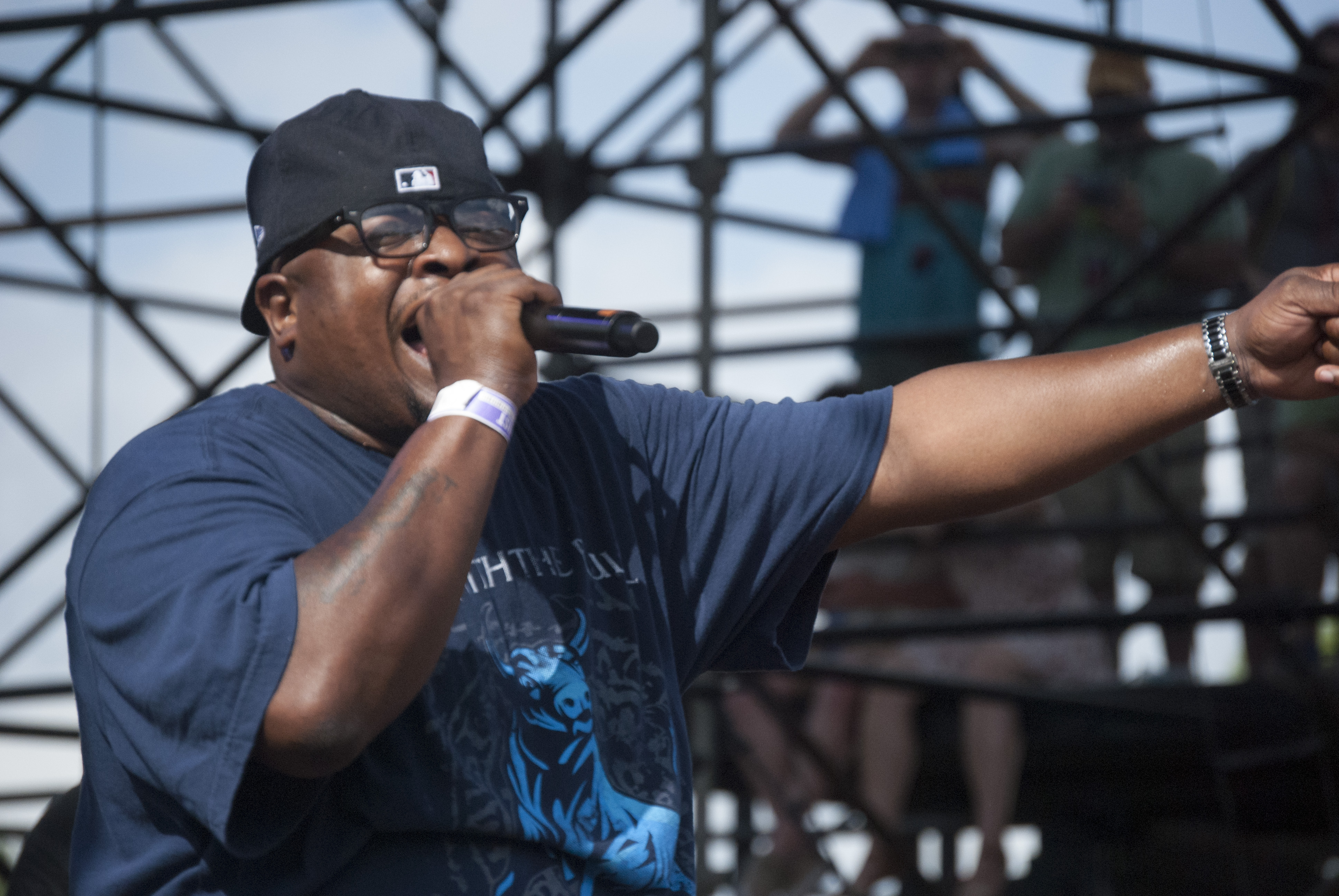
- Studio albums: 11
- Compilation albums: 4
- Singles: 20

This is the solo discography of American rapper Scarface. It consists of eleven studio albums, four compilation albums, two mixtapes and 20 singles. For albums recorded with the Geto Boys, see Geto_Boys_discography.

== Albums ==
=== Studio albums ===
List of albums, with selected chart positions
Title	Album details	Peak chart positions		Certifications
Title	Album details	US	US R&B	Certifications
Mr. Scarface Is Back	Released: October 8, 1991; Label: Rap-A-Lot; Format: CD, LP, cassette, digital download	51	13	RIAA: Gold
The World Is Yours	Released: August 17, 1993; Label: Rap-A-Lot; Format: CD, LP, cassette, digital download	7	1	RIAA: Gold
The Diary	Released: October 18, 1994; Label: Rap-A-Lot; Format: CD, LP, cassette, digital download	2	2	RIAA: Platinum
The Untouchable	Released: March 11, 1997; Label: Rap-A-Lot; Format: CD, LP, cassette, digital download	1	1	RIAA: Platinum
My Homies	Released: March 3, 1998; Label: Rap-A-Lot; Format: CD, LP, cassette, digital download	4	1	RIAA: Platinum
The Last of a Dying Breed	Released: October 3, 2000; Label: Rap-A-Lot; Format: CD, LP, cassette, digital download	7	2	RIAA: Gold
The Fix	Released: August 6, 2002; Label: Def Jam South; Format: CD, digital download	4	1	
My Homies Part 2	Released: March 7, 2006; Label: Rap-A-Lot; Format: CD, digital download	12	3	
Made	Released: December 4, 2007; Label: Rap-A-Lot; Format: CD, digital download	17	2	
Emeritus	Released: December 2, 2008; Label: Rap-A-Lot; Format: CD, digital download	24	4	
Deeply Rooted	Released: September 4, 2015; Label: Facemob Music; Format: CD, LP, digital download	11	3	

=== Collaborative albums ===
Title	Album details	Peak chart positions	
Title	Album details	US	US R&B
The Other Side of the Law (with Facemob)	Released: August 7, 1996; Label: Rap-A-Lot; Format: CD	51	6
One Hunid (with The Product)	Released: February 21, 2006; Label: Koch; Format: CD	78	14

=== Compilation albums ===
Title	Album details	Peak chart positions	
Title	Album details	US	US R&B
Greatest Hits	Released: October 22, 2002; Label: Rap-A-Lot; Format: CD	40	10
Balls and My Word	Released: April 8, 2003; Label: Rap-A-Lot; Format: CD	20	3
Deeply Rooted: The Lost Files	Released: December 15, 2017; Label: Facemob Music; Format: CD	—	—

== Mixtapes ==
Title	Mixtape details	Peak chart positions	
Title	Mixtape details	US	US R&B
Dopeman Music	Released: April 27, 2010; Label: Facemob Music; Format: CD	—	50
Work Ethic	Released: June 14, 2011; Label: Facemob Music; Format: CD	—	—

== Singles ==
List of singles, with selected chart positions and certifications, showing year released and album name
Title	Year	Peak chart positions				Certifications	Album
Title	Year	US	US R&B	US Rap	UK	Certifications	Album
"Mr. Scarface"	1991	—	—	8	—		Mr. Scarface Is Back
"A Minute to Pray and a Second to Die"	1992	—	69	13	—		Mr. Scarface Is Back
"Let Me Roll"	1993	87	50	2	—		The World Is Yours
"Now I Feel Ya"	1993	—	79	19	—		The World Is Yours
"I Seen a Man Die"	1994	37	15	2	55		The Diary
"Hand of the Dead Body" (featuring Ice Cube and Devin the Dude)	1994	74	39	9	41		The Diary
"Among the Walking Dead" (featuring Facemob)	1995	—	91	14	—		The Walking Dead (soundtrack)
"Smile" (featuring 2Pac and Johnny P)	1997	12	4	2	—	RIAA: Gold	The Untouchable
"Mary Jane"	1997	—	—	—	—		The Untouchable
"Game Over" (featuring Dr. Dre, Ice Cube and Too $hort)	1997	—	—	—	34		The Untouchable
"Homies & Thuggs" (featuring Master P and 2Pac)	1998	—	—	—	—		My Homies
"Sex Faces" (featuring Too $hort, Tela, and Devin the Dude)	1998	—	—	—	—		My Homies
"It Ain't, Pt. 2"	2000	—	77	—	—		The Last of a Dying Breed
"Guess Who's Back" (featuring Jay-Z and Beanie Sigel)	2002	79	28	5	—		The Fix
"My Block"	2002	—	46	—	—		The Fix
"Someday" (featuring Faith Evans)	2002	—	— (Note: "Someday" did not enter the Hot R&B/Hip-Hop Songs chart, but peaked at number 60 on the Hot R&B/Hip-Hop Singles Sales chart.)	—	—		The Fix
"Girl You Know" (featuring Trey Songz)	2007	—	51	—	—		Made
"High Powered"	2008	—	90	—	—		Emeritus
"No Problem"	2014	—	—	—	—		Deeply Rooted
"Exit Plan"	2014	—	—	—	—		Deeply Rooted
"—" denotes a recording that did not chart or was not released in that territory.

== Guest appearances ==
List of non-single guest appearances, with other performing artists, showing year released and album name
Title	Year	Other artist(s)	Album
"Dead End Street"	1992	Mad Cobra, Geto Boys	Hard to Wet, Easy to Dry
"Action Speaks Louder Than Words"	1992	Ganksta N-I-P, Willie D, Seagram	The South Park Psycho
"Fugitives on the Run"	1992	Too Much Trouble	Bringing Hell on Earth
"Street Life"	1992	—N/a	South Central (soundtrack)
"N 2 Deep"	1992	Compton's Most Wanted	Music to Driveby
"Two to the Head"	1992	Kool G Rap & DJ Polo, Bushwick Bill, Ice Cube	Live and Let Die
"Still on the Run"	1993	Too Much Trouble	Player's Choice
"Studio Gangster"	1993	5th Ward Boyz	Ghetto Dope
"Buck Em Down"	1993	DMG, Big Mike, 5th Ward Boyz, 2 Low, Mr. 3-2	Rigormortiz
"Funky Lil Brother"	1993	2 Low	Funky Lil Brotha
"The Groove with Mr. Scarface (Strictly for the Funk Lovers Pt. 2)"	1993	2 Low	Funky Lil Brotha
"Came Na Godown"	1994	Odd Squad, 2 Low, 3-2, 6-4, Cozy-K, Ed Jack, Kilo (12), Les Money*, No-DoZ*, Rick Royal*, Scarface (3), Smitty*, The Unrappable	Fadanuf Fa Erybody!!
"Daddy's Gone"	1994	Big Mike	Somethin' Serious
"Jesse James"	1994	—N/a	Jason's Lyric (soundtrack) / The Diary
"Friday Night"	1995	CJ Mac	Friday (soundtrack)
"Face Mob"	1995	Facemob	Tales from the Hood: The Soundtrack / Facemob
"Skrilla"	1996	Facemob	High School High: The Soundtrack
"Ride 4 Me"	1997	4-A-Gee	Big 50
"Sleepin in My Nikes"	1997	Seagram	Souls on Ice
"I Know"	1997	5th Ward Boyz	Usual Suspects
"You Delinquent"	1998	—N/a	The Players Club (soundtrack)
"Betrayal"	1998	Gang Starr	Moment of Truth
"Who Am I"	1998	Do or Die	Headz or Tailz
"Take It Like a Playa"	1998	Johnny P., Do or Die	The Next
"Sticky Green"	1998	Devin the Dude	The Dude
"Like a Sweet"	1998	Devin the Dude, Jugg Mugg, Killemall, Ant Live	The Dude
"Small Time"	1998	Lil' Troy, Lil' 2-Low, Lil' Will	Sittin' Fat Down South
"Another Head Put to Rest"	1998	Lil Troy, Willie D	Sittin' Fat Down South
"Roll Wit It"	1998	Tela, Hoodlumz	Now or Never
"No Sunshine"	1998	Ghetto Twiinz	No Pain No Gain
"Mo Power"	1998	A-G-2-A-Ke, Lo Life	Mil-Ticket
"Tomorrow Ain't Promised"	1998	A-G-2-A-Ke, K.B., Man Child	Mil-Ticket
"Guess Who Done It"	1998	A-G-2-A-Ke	Mil-Ticket
"The Don"	1998	A-G-2-A-Ke	Mil-Ticket
"Favor for a Favor"	1999	Nas	I Am...
"Gotta Love Gangsta's"	1999	Tha Realest, Richie Rich	Chronic 2000
"Longevity"	1999	Too Short, K.B., Otis & Shug	Can't Stay Away
"Mac & Brad"	2000	Beanie Sigel	The Truth
"Took the Bait"	2000	Dangerous	Bait (soundtrack)
"The World Ain't Enuff"	2000	Tela, Lo Key, MJ	The World Ain't Enuff
"Nigga Haters"	2000	Dame Grease, H.O.T. Ones	Live on Lenox Ave.
"WW III"	2000	Ruff Ryders, Snoop Dogg, Yung Wun, Jadakiss	Ryde or Die Vol. 2
"Dem Boys"	2000	Willie D, Lil Wayne	Loved by Few, Hated by Many
"This Can't Be Life"	2000	Jay-Z, Beanie Sigel	The Dynasty: Roc La Familia
"Real Niggaz"	2001	Redman, Icarus, Mally G, Treach	Malpractice
"Suicide"	2001	—N/a	The Fast and the Furious (soundtrack)
"Mom Praying"	2001	Beanie Sigel	The Reason
"The Good, The Bad, The Thugly (Full Force Ain't Nothin' to F**ck With)"	2001	Full Force, Raekwon, Bam-Bué	Still Standing
"Figadoh"	2001	Benzino, Snoop Dogg	Rush Hour 2 Soundtrack) / The Benzino Project
"Soldiers"	2001	Big Lew, B-Legit	Playa Hatin' 101
"Do-Re-Mi"	2001	Erick Sermon, LL Cool J	Music
"Street Shit"	2001	Greg Street	Six O'Clock, Vol. 1
"I Luv"	2001	Too Short, Trick Daddy, Daz Dillinger	Chase the Cat
"Let It Be Known"	2001	Mack 10, Xzibit	Bang or Ball
"Invincible"	2002	Roy Jones Jr.	Round One: The Album/Balls & My Word
"Gangsta"	2002	Trick Daddy, Birdman	Thug Holiday
"Growing Pains (Do It Again)" (Remix)	2002	Lil' Fate, Ludacris, Shawnna, Keon Bryce	Golden Grain
"Baby (Remix)"	2002	Ashanti	Irv Gotti Presents: The Remixes
"So Hard"	2002	WC	Ghetto Heisman
"Somehow, Someway"	2002	Jay-Z, Beanie Sigel	The Blueprint 2: The Gift & The Curse
"Bust at You"	2002	Fat Joe, Birdman, Tony Sunshine	Loyalty
"Fuck the Police"	2002	Facemob	Silence
"Daddy"	2002	Hussein Fatal	Fatal
"I Never Liked Ya Ass"	2003	DJ Kay Slay, Fat Joe, Raekwon	The Streetsweeper, Vol. 1
"44 Kal Killa"	2003	Benzino, M3	Redemption
"Murda"	2003	Nokio, T.O.K.	Def Jamaica
"The Game"	2003	David Banner	MTA2: Baptized in Dirty Water
"Next Generation"	2003	Wyclef Jean, Rah Digga	The Preacher's Son
"These Niggaz"	2004	Z-Ro	The Life of Joseph W. McVey
"Face Off"	2004	DJ Kay Slay, Ghostface Killah	The Streetsweeper, Vol. 2
"Thru the Fire"	2004	Jon B	Stronger Everyday
"Southside" (Remix)	2004	Lloyd, Ashanti	Southside
"Nowhere to Run"	2005	Capone	Pain, Time & Glory
"I Got You"	2005	Twisted Black	The Life of Tommy Burns
"Pressure"	2005	275	Unlawful Entry
"Comin' Where I'm From (Remix)"	2005	Anthony Hamilton, Jermaine Dupri	—N/a
"Pushin'"	2005	Bun B, Young Jeezy	Trill
"What's Really Good"	2005	Benzino	Arch Nemesis
"Sunshine to the Rain"	2005	Miri Ben-Ari, Anthony Hamilton	The Hip-Hop Violinist
"Rain"	2005	Chamillionaire, Billy Cook	The Sound of Revenge
"Hustler's Story"	2005	The Notorious B.I.G., Big Gee, Akon	Duets: The Final Chapter
"The Corner"(Remix)	2005	Common, Mos Def	Be
"The Way of Life"	2006	Diz, Allen Anthony	It's My Turn
"Bumpin' My Music"	2006	Ray Cash	Cash on Delivery
"Ghetto"	2006	Smitty, John Legend, Kanye West	Voice of the Ghetto
"Rock 4 Rock"	2006	Pimp C, Willie D	Pimpalation
"Gangsta Niggaz"	2006	Ludacris	Pre-Release Therapy
"Iceman"	2006	Lloyd Banks, Young Buck, 8Ball	Rotten Apple
"Still Ridin' Dirty"	2007	UGK	Underground Kingz
"Rise & Shine"	2007	Devin the Dude & Coughee Brothaz	Waitin' Our Turn
"Baby Don't Do It"	2007	Freeway	Free at Last
"Rain (Bridge)"	2007	Beanie Sigel, Raheem DeVaughn	The Solution
"Pillow Talkin'"	2008	Tech N9ne	Killer
"Gangsta Rap Made Me Do It'" (Remix)	2008	Ice Cube, Nas	Raw Footage
"The Dope Game"	2008	Yung Texxus, Heleze, Trae MJ & G-Mack	—N/a
"Yacht Music"	2009	DJ Drama, Nas, Willie the Kid, Marsha Ambrosius	Gangsta Grillz: The Album (Vol. 2)
"The Mayor"	2009	N.A.S.A, Ghostface Killah, The Cool Kids	The Spirit of Apollo
"Hard"	2009	Slim Thug, J-Dawg	Boss of All Bosses
"Finer Thangs"	2010	Cor'le, Bernstien	n/a
"Ride wit Me"	2010	Young Jeezy, Trick Daddy	Trap or Die 2
"Rollin & Smokin"	2010	Spice 1, 2Pac, Devin the Dude	—N/a
"How Life Changed"	2010	T.I., Mitchelle'l	No Mercy
"Goes Out"	2011	Trae Tha Truth, Brian Angel, J-Dawg	Street King
"Pushin' On"	2011	Outlawz, Lloyd	Perfect Timing
"Chase"	2012	M.U.G., Slim Thug	Money & Pain
"Scarface"	2012	Gucci Mane	I'm Up
"Ghetto Dreams"	2012	2 Chainz, John Legend	Based on a T.R.U. Story
"Hip Hop"	2012	DJ Khaled, Nas, DJ Premier	Kiss the Ring
"Chris Benoit" (Remix)	2012	Insane Clown Posse, Ice Cube	Mike E. Clark's Extra Pop Emporium
"Problem Solver"	2012	Vinnie Paz	God of the Serengeti
"Murder"	2012	The Game, Kendrick Lamar	—N/a
"Limitless"	2012	Wale	Folarin
"Godfather Business"	2013	Mayalino	Bird Day
"Don't Wanna Be in Love" (Remix)	2013	Brooke Valentine	Love Letters
"I Been On" (Remix)	2013	Bun B, Z-Ro, Willie D, Lil Keke, Slim Thug, Beyoncé	—N/a
"What I Had to Do"	2013	N.O.R.E.	Student of the Game
"Fuck What Happens Tonight"	2013	French Montana, Mavado, DJ Khaled Ace Hood, Snoop Dogg	Excuse My French
"Reign Fall"	2013	Chamillionaire, Killer Mike, Bobby Moon	Reignfall
"If I Die Today"	2013	King Chip, MJG	44108
"Swangin"	2013	Stalley, Joi Tiffany	Honest Cowboy
"Hollywood"	2013	The Game	OKE: Operation Kill Everything
"Never Surrender"	2013	DJ Khaled, Akon, Anthony Hamilton, John Legend, Meek Mill, Jadakiss	Suffering from Success
"Blessing in Disguise"	2014	Rick Ross, Z-Ro	Mastermind
"Broken"	2014	Freddie Gibbs, Madlib	Piñata
"Who's Crazy"	2015	DJ EFN, DJ Premier, Stalley, Troy Ave	Another Time
"Blowed"	2015	Berner, B-Real	Prohibition Part 2
"Last Time You Seen"	2015	The Game, Stacy Barthe	The Documentary 2.5
"Don't Change"	2016	Lil Keke	Slfmade
"Go On"	2017	Berner, Styles P	Vibes
"Born Sinners"	2017	Outlawz	LastOnezLeft
"Lights Glowing"	2017	DJ Kay Slay, Styles P, Sheek Louch	The Big Brother
"Money All the Time"	2018	Killa Kyleon, Z-Ro, Willie D, Devin the Dude	Candy Paint n Texas Plates
"I'm Gon Make U Sick O'me"	2018	Parliament	Medicaid Fraud Dogg
"Watch the Homies"	2019	E-40	Practice Makes Paper
"Both Eyes Open"	2020	Slim Thug, Z-Ro	Thug Life
"Live and Let Live"	2021	Devin the Dude, Slim Thug	Soulful Distance
"Decoded"	2022	Freddie Gibbs	Soul Sold Separately
"Street Made"	2023	DJ Muggs, Freddie Gibbs	SA3: Death Valley
"Slid On"	2024	The Mekanix, Benny the Butcher & Mozzy	—N/a
"It's My Ego (3mix)"	2025	Ice Cube	—N/a

== Music Videos ==
Year	Song	Album	Primary Artist
1991	A Minute to Pray, A Second to Die	Mr. Scarface Is Back	Scarface
1991	Money and the Power	Mr. Scarface Is Back	Scarface
1992	Fugitives on the Run	Fugitives	Too Much Trouble
1992	Street Life	South Central OST	Scarface
1993	Funky Lil Brotha	Funky Lil Brother	2 Low
1993	Now I Feel Ya	The World Is Yours	Scarface
1994	I Seen a Man Die	The Diary	Scarface
	Hand of the Dead Body (feat. Ice Cube)	The Diary	Scarface
1995	Among the Walking Dead (feat. Facemob)	The Walking Dead OST	Scarface
1997	Smile (feat. 2Pac)	Untouchable	Scarface
1997	Mary Jane	Untouchable	Scarface
1998	Homies and Thugs (Remix) [feat. Master P & 2Pac]	My Homies	Scarface
2000	It Ain't Part II	Last of a Dying Breed	Scarface
2000	WWIII (feat. Yung Wun, Snoop Dogg, Jadakiss)	Ryde or Die Vol. 2	Ruff Ryders
2001	I Luv (feat. Trick Daddy, Daz)	Chase the Cat	Too Short
2002	Growing Pains	Golden Grain	DTP
2002	On My Block	The Fix	Scarface
2002	Someday (feat. Faith Evans)	The Fix	Scarface
2004	Southside (Remix) [feat. Ashanti]	N.A	Lloyd
2005	Sunshine to the Rain (feat. Anthony Hamilton)	The Hip-Hop Violinist	Miri Ben-Ari
2006	Bumpin My Music	C.O.D.	Ray Cash
2007	Girl You Know (feat. Trey Songz)	M.A.D.E.	Scarface
2008	High Powered	Emeritus	Scarface
2012	Hoodies	N.A	Willie D
2013	Never Surrender (feat. Akon, Anthony Hamilton, Meek Mill, Jadakiss)	Suffering From Success	DJ Khaled
2015	Exit Plan (Feat. Akon)	Deeply Rooted	Scarface
2015	Mental Exorcism	Deeply Rooted	Scarface
2015	Steer (feat. Rush Davis)	Deeply Rooted	Scarface
2015	Fuck You Too (feat. Z-Ro)	Deeply Rooted	Scarface
2017	Born Sinners	Last Ones Left	Outlawz
