= Greatest Hits (Scarface album) =

Greatest hits album by Scarface
- Released: October 22, 2002
- Recorded: 1990–2002
- Genre: Hip-hop
- Length: 1:16:50
- Labels: Rap-A-Lot; Virgin
- Producers: John Bido; J. Prince; Kanye West; Leslie Brathwaite; Mike Dean; Mr. Lee; N.O. Joe; Scarface; Tone Capone

Scarface chronology
Greatest Hits (2002)	The Best Of (2008)

Professional ratings
Review scores
Source	Rating
AllMusic	4.5/5 stars
Rolling Stone	3/5 stars
The New Rolling Stone Album Guide	4/5 stars

Greatest Hits is the first compilation album by American rapper Scarface. It was released on October 22, 2002 via Rap-A-Lot/Virgin Records. Composed of 17 previously released songs from his solo albums and a new song, it was produced by Scarface himself, N.O. Joe, Mike Dean, Tone Capone, John Bido, Kanye West, Leslie Brathwaite, Mr. Lee, and J. Prince, who also served as executive producer. It features guest appearances from Devin the Dude, 2Pac, Beanie Sigel, Ice Cube, Jay-Z, Johnny P., Master P, Tela and Too $hort.

In the United States, the album peaked at number 40 on the Billboard 200 and number 10 on the Top R&B/Hip-Hop Albums charts. Later that same year, a chopped and screwed remix version of the album was released entitled Greatest Hits Chopped Up, with slightly different track listing, edited by DJ Michael "5000" Watts.

In 2010, Rhapsody called it one of the best "coke rap" albums of all time.

== Track listing ==
No.	Title	Writer(s)	Producer(s)	Length
1.	"Mr. Scarface"	Brad Jordan; John Okuribido; Mark James	Scarface; John Bido	5:29
2.	"Money and the Power"	Jordan; Okuribido	John Bido	3:43
3.	"Let Me Roll"	Jordan; Joseph Johnson; George Duke	Scarface; N.O. Joe	4:07
4.	"Southside"	Jordan; Michael Dean; Anthony Gilmour	Scarface; Mike Dean; Tone Capone	2:14
5.	"Mary Jane"	Jordan; Dean; Gilmour	Scarface; Mike Dean; Tone Capone	3:09
6.	"Goin' Down"	Jordan; Johnson; Eddie Wilson; Jörn-Uwe Fahrenkrog-Petersen; Carlo Karges	Scarface; N.O. Joe	4:28
7.	"Smile" (featuring 2Pac and Johnny P.)	Jordan; Tupac Shakur; Dean; Gilmour	Scarface; Mike Dean; Tone Capone	5:00
8.	"Fuck Faces" (featuring Too $hort, Devin the Dude and Tela)	Jordan; Todd Shaw; Devin Copeland; Winston Rogers; Dean	Scarface; Mike Dean	6:17
9.	"Homies & Thugs" (featuring Master P)	Jordan; Percy Miller; Jalil Hutchins; Lawrence Smith	N.O. Joe; Mike Dean	3:53
10.	"Guess Who's Back" (featuring Jay-Z and Beanie Sigel)	Jordan; Shawn Carter; Dwight Grant; Kanye West; Michael B. Sutton; Brenda Sutton; Tom DePierro	Kanye West	4:01
11.	"Love & Friendship"	Jordan; Leslie Brathwaite	Leslie Brathwaite	4:15
12.	"Now I Feel Ya"	Jordan; Dean; Okuribido	Scarface; Mike Dean	7:32
13.	"I Seen a Man Die"	Jordan; Johnson; Dean	Scarface; N.O. Joe	3:59
14.	"Hand of the Dead Body" (featuring Ice Cube and Devin the Dude)	Jordan; O'Shea Jackson; Johnson; Dean; Wilson	Scarface; N.O. Joe	3:52
15.	"Look Me in My Eyes"	Jordan; Johnson; Leroy Williams; James Stanley	N.O. Joe; Mr. Lee	3:32
16.	"Jesse James"	Jordan; Johnson; Dean	Scarface; N.O. Joe; Mike Dean	3:26
17.	"Born Killer"	Jordan; James Smith	Scarface; Lil' J	3:33
18.	"A Minute to Pray"	Jordan; Marvin Gaye; James Nyx	Scarface	4:20
Total length:				1:16:50

Sample credits

- Track 1 contains a portion of "Too Smooth" written by the Tuff City Squad.
- Track 3 contains portions of "Dukey Stick" written by George Duke.
- Track 10 contains excerpts from "Sunrise" written by Michael B. Sutton, Brenda Sutton and Tom DePierro and performed by the Originals.
- Track 18 contains samples from "Inner City Blues (Make Me Wanna Holler)" written by Marvin Gaye and James Nyx Jr.

== Charts ==
Chart (2002)	Peak position
US Billboard 200	40
US Top R&B/Hip-Hop Albums (Billboard)	10
