= Deeply Rooted =

Studio album by Scarface
- Released: September 4, 2015
- Recorded: 2014–2015
- Genre: Hip hop
- Length: 54:43
- Label: Facemob
- Producers: Chuck Heat; Ervin "EP" Pope; J. Baum; Key; Luke Walker; Mike Dean; M. Mac; N.O. Joe; Spuf Don

Scarface chronology
Emeritus (2008)	Deeply Rooted (2015)	Deeply Rooted: The Lost Files (2017)

Deeply Rooted is the eleventh solo studio album by American rapper Scarface. It was released on September 4, 2015, via Facemob Music.

The album was produced by N.O. Joe, Ervin "EP" Pope, Spuf Don, Mike Dean, Chuck Heat, J. Baum, KEY, Luke Walker, M. Mac, and Nottz. It features guest appearances from Papa Reu, Z-Ro, Avant, CeeLo Green, G.I., Jack Freeman, John Legend, Nas, Rich Andruws, Rick Ross, and Rush Davis.

In the United States, the album debuted at number 11 on the Billboard 200, number 3 on both the Top R&B/Hip-Hop Albums and the Independent Albums, and number 2 on the Top Rap Albums, selling 22,180 copies in its first week.

== Critical reception ==
Professional ratings
Review scores
Source	Rating
AllHipHop	9/10
AllMusic	3.5/5 stars
Exclaim!	7/10
HipHopDX	4/5
RapReviews	8/10

Deeply Rooted was met with generally favourable reviews from music critics. AllHipHop reviewer praised the album, calling it "one of the better albums by one of the game's best emcees, and so that still makes for one of dopest hip-hop albums in recent years". Aaron McKrell of HipHopDX found "musically, Deeply Rooted is low-key, superbly playing to Scarface's strengths. Piano loops and thick drums draw in the listener while allowing Scarface to take center stage on several tracks, providing the album with a cohesive feel without sounding repetitive". Matt Jost of RapReviews praised N.O. Joe's production and called it "a vintage Scarface album". AllMusic's David Jeffries called it "an album that touches upon the man's beliefs with the key cut being 'God'". Erin Lowers of Exclaim! concluded: "although Deeply Rooted may not hold up to previous albums in the grand scheme of his discography, the veteran once again planted seeds for his legacy to grow".

=== Accolades ===
Publication	List	Rank	Ref.
HipHopDX	The Top 25 Albums of 2015	—N/a	

== Track listing ==
No.	Title	Writer(s)	Producer(s)	Length
1.	"Intro"	Brad Jordan; Michael Dean	Mike Dean	0:59
2.	"Rooted" (featuring Papa Reu)	Jordan; Reuben Nero; Joseph Johnson	N.O. Joe	3:37
3.	"The Hot Seat" (featuring Jack Freeman)	Jordan; Jack Freeman; Johnson	N.O. Joe	4:13
4.	"Dope Man Pushin'" (featuring Papa Reu)	Jordan; Nero; Johnson	N.O. Joe; Spuf Don	3:17
5.	"Fuck You Too" (featuring Z-Ro)	Jordan; Joseph McVey; Charles Henderson; Johnson	Chuck Heat; N.O. Joe (co.)	3:52
6.	"Steer" (featuring Rush Davis)	Jordan; Dominique Rushon Davis; Luke Whitman Walker	Luke Walker	4:28
7.	"Anything" (featuring Rich Andruws)	Jordan; Johnson	N.O. Joe; Nottz (co.)	4:21
8.	"Do What I Do" (featuring Nas, Rick Ross and Z-Ro)	Jordan; Nasir Jones; William Roberts II; McVey; Johnson	N.O. Joe; Spuf Don	4:25
9.	"God" (featuring John Legend)	Jordan; John Stephens; Ervin Pope; Johnson	EP; N.O. Joe	4:52
10.	"Keep It Movin'" (featuring Avant)	Jordan; Myron Avant; Johnson	N.O. Joe; Spuf Don	4:49
11.	"You" (featuring CeeLo Green)	Jordan; Thomas Callaway; Pope; Johnson	EP; N.O. Joe	3:04
12.	"All Bad" (featuring G.I.)	Jordan; Pope; Johnson; Jonathan King; Venus Brown	EP; N.O. Joe (co.)	4:38
13.	"Voices"	Jordan; Hayley Gene Penner; Michael McNamara; Jordan Baum	M. Mac; J. Baum	4:15
14.	"No Problem"	Jordan; Ryan Kent Belcher	Key	2:55
15.	"Outro"	Jordan; Dean	Mike Dean	0:58
Total length:				54:43

Best Buy deluxe edition bonus tracks
No.	Title	Writer(s)	Producer(s)	Length
16.	"Exit Plan" (featuring Akon)	Jordan; Aliaune Thiam; Carl E. McCormick	Cardiak	4:33
17.	"Mental Exorcism" (featuring Alex Isley)	Jordan; Jeremy McArthur; Amir Epstein; Pope	Arthur McArthur; Amir Epstein	3:36
18.	"I Don't Know"	Jordan; Urales Vargas	DJ Buddha	4:28

== Charts ==
=== Weekly charts ===
Chart (2015)	Peak position
US Billboard 200	11
US Top R&B/Hip-Hop Albums (Billboard)	3
US Top Rap Albums (Billboard)	2
US Independent Albums (Billboard)	3

=== Year-end charts ===
Chart (2015)	Position
US Top R&B/Hip-Hop Albums (Billboard)	74
