= A Minute to Pray, a Second to Die =

A Minute to Pray, a Second to Die may refer to:

- A Minute to Pray, a Second to Die (album), a 1981 album by The Flesh Eaters
- A Minute to Pray, a Second to Die (film), a 1968 Italian spaghetti western

== See also ==
- "A Minute to Pray and a Second to Die", a 1992 song by Scarface
