= Sho'nuff =

Sho' Nuff is an eye dialect spelling of a slang expression meaning "sure enough", as expressed in African American Vernacular English. It was widely used in blues music, sometimes as an interjection.

Sho' Nuff can also refer to:

- Sho'nuff (character), the Shogun of Harlem, from Berry Gordy's The Last Dragon
- Sho'nuff Records, an Atlanta-based record company
- Sho' Nuff (album), a 1998 box set release from the Black Crowes
- "Sho Nuff" (song), a 1996 song by Tela
- "Sho' Nuff", a 1973 song by Sly, Slick and Wicked
- "Sho Nuff", a B-side of Fatboy Slim's 1999 single "Praise You"
- "Sho-Nuff", a song by KC & The Sunshine Band from their 1978 album Who Do Ya (Love)
- ”Sho' Nuff”, a song by Freeway and Jake One from their 2010 album The Stimulus Package

== See also ==
- Sure 'Nuff, 1970 album by Sonny Phillips
- "Sure Enough" a 1996 song by Chris Cummings
