= Double Dose (Tela album) =

Studio album by Tela
- Released: October 8, 2002
- Recorded: 2002
- Studio: House Of Blues Studios (Memphis, TN); Out Da Woods Studios (Memphis, TN); Dean's List House Of Hits (Houston, TX)
- Genre: Southern hip hop; gangsta rap; hardcore hip hop
- Length: 1:07:43
- Label: Rap-A-Lot Resurrection
- Producer: J. Prince (exec.); DJ Jus Borne; DJ Slice Tee; Drumma Boy; Ensayne Wayne; Jazze Pha; Paragon; Tela

Tela chronology
The World Ain't Enuff (2000)	Double Dose (2002)

Professional ratings
Review scores
Source	Rating
RapReviews	8/10

Double Dose is the fourth studio album by American rapper Tela. It was released on October 8, 2002, through Rap-A-Lot Resurrection. Recording sessions took place at House Of Blues Studios and Out Da Woods Studios in Memphis and at Dean's List House Of Hits in Houston. Production was handled by Tela himself, along with DJ Slice T, Drumma Boy, Insane Wayne, Paragon, DJ Jus Borne and Jazze Pha. It features guest appearances from Bun B, Jazze Pha, Low Key, Criminal Manne, Devin the Dude, 8Ball & MJG, Gangsta Boo, Haystak, Maru, Papa Reu, Streetboy, The Game, Yo Gotti and Geno. The album peaked at number 116 on the Billboard 200 and number 18 on the Top R&B/Hip-Hop Albums.

== Track listing ==
No.	Title	Writer(s)	Producer(s)	Length
1.	"Intro"	Winston Rogers; Sheldon Arrington	Slice T; Tela	1:58
2.	"Pimp Bitch" (featuring Bun B)	Rogers; Bernard Freeman; Arrington	Slice T	4:58
3.	"Incredible" (featuring Geno)	Rogers; Arrington	Slice T	5:51
4.	"Round & Round" (featuring Geno)	Rogers; James Blake	DJ Jus Borne; Tela; Mike Dean (co.)	3:46
5.	"Tennessee Titans" (featuring Gangsta Boo, Yo Gotti, Haystak, Criminal Manne and Maru)	Rogers; Lola Mitchell; Mario Mims; Jason Winfree; V. Watkins; Christopher Gholson	Drumma Boy; Tela	4:19
6.	"Double Dose"	Rogers; Ferrell Miles	Ensayne Wayne; Tela	5:25
7.	"25 Hoes" (featuring 8Ball & MJG and Jazze Pha)	Rogers; Premro Smith; Marlon Goodwin; Phalon Alexander	Jazze Pha	3:57
8.	"Down 4 Me" (featuring Devin the Dude)	Rogers; Devin Copeland; Arrington	Slice T	4:38
9.	"Wangin'" (featuring StreetBoy, Low Key and Papa Reu)	Rogers; C. Simon; Thomas McCollum	Drumma Boy; Tela	3:49
10.	"Tear It Up" (featuring Low Key and Geno)	Rogers; McCollum; Arrington	Slice T	4:06
11.	"Coco" (featuring Jazze Pha)	Rogers; Miles	Ensayne Wayne; Tela	4:23
12.	"Hold Up Man!"	Rogers; Stephen Carroll	Paragon; Tela	4:22
13.	"Dreams" (featuring Bun B and The Game)	Rogers; Freeman; Jayceon Taylor; Carroll; Michael Dean	Paragon; Tela; Mike Dean (co.)	4:44
14.	"Strive"	Rogers; Gholson; Dean	Drumma Boy; Tela; Mike Dean (co.)	4:48
15.	"Shake It Off"	Rogers; Arrington	Slice T; Tela	4:41
16.	"Outro"	Rogers; Arrington	Slice T; Tela	1:59
Total length:				1:07:43

== Personnel ==
- Winston "Tela" Rogers – main artist, producer (tracks: 1, 4–6, 9, 11–16)
- Marcus McRee – additional vocals (tracks: 1, 15, 16)
- Eric Gales – guitar (tracks: 1, 12)
- Bernard "Bun B" Freeman – featured artist (tracks: 2, 13)
- Geno – chorus (tracks: 3, 4, 10), additional vocals (track 14)
- Lola "Gangsta Boo" Mitchell – featured artist (track 5)
- Mario "Yo Gotti" Mims – featured artist (track 5)
- Jason "Haystak" Winfree – featured artist (track 5)
- Criminal Manne of Project Playaz – featured artist (track 5)
- Maru – featured artist (track 5)
- Christopher "Drumma Boy" Gholson – additional vocals (track 5), producer (tracks: 5, 9, 14)
- Candice – additional vocals (track 6)
- Choosey – additional vocals (track 6)
- Premro "8Ball" Smith – featured artist (track 7)
- Marlon "MJG" Goodwin – featured artist (track 7)
- Phalon "Jazze Pha" Alexander – featured artist (tracks: 7, 11), producer (track 7)
- Devin "Devin the Dude" Copeland – featured artist (track 8)
- Streetboy – featured artist (track 9)
- Thomas "Low Key" McCollum – featured artist (tracks: 9, 10)
- Reuben "Papa Reu" Nero – featured artist (track 9)
- Jewel Santez – additional vocals (track 12)
- Jayceon "The Game" Taylor – featured artist (track 13)
- Poizon – additional vocals (track 15)
- Sheldon "Slice T" Arrington – producer (tracks: 1–3, 8, 10, 15, 16), engineering, mixing
- James "DJ Jus Borne" Blake – producer (track 4), engineering, mixing
- Mike Dean – co-producer (tracks: 4, 13, 14), mixing, mastering
- Ferrell "Ensayne Wayne" Miles – producer (tracks: 6, 11)
- Stephen "Paragon" Carroll – producer (tracks: 12, 13)
- Jeff Wilbanks – engineering
- Lil' Pat – engineering
- James "J Prince" Smith – executive producer
- Jason Clark – design, layout
- Rick Mapes – photography
- Anzel "Int'l Red" Jennings – A&R
- Tony "Big Chief" Randle – A&R

== Charts ==
Chart (2002)	Peak position
US Billboard 200	116
US Top R&B/Hip-Hop Albums (Billboard)	18
