= Dopeman Music =

Mixtape by Scarface
- Released: April 27, 2010
- Genre: Gangsta rap
- Length: 41:52
- Label: Facemob Music

Scarface chronology
Emeritus (2008)	Dopeman Music (2010)	Deeply Rooted (2015)

Professional ratings
Review scores
Source	Rating
AllMusic	4/5 stars
HipHopDX	4/5 stars
Pitchfork Media	(7.7/10)
RapReviews	(6.5/10)
Vibesblog	(Favorable)

Dopeman Music is the first mixtape by southern rapper Scarface. It was released on his independent label Facemob Music. The song "Dopeman Music" had a promotional video. 2 years after Scarface announced his retirement he came back to hip hop with this mixtape; speaking on the issue Scarface said, "I'm a free agent".

== Track listing ==
No.	Title	Length
1.	"Picking Up the Pieces"	1:24
2.	"Dopeman Music" (featuring B. James and Monk Kaza)	3:38
3.	"Lyrical Assault" (featuring Malice and Mr. Lo Key)	4:12
4.	"FaSho Money (Skit)"	0:19
5.	"GWAP" (featuring B. James and Monk Kaza)	2:34
6.	"Get Lost" (featuring B. James, Monk Kaza and Rodney Gant)	4:16
7.	"The N Word"	1:05
8.	"The Ghetto Report" (featuring B. James and Monk Kaza)	4:21
9.	"In the City"	4:16
10.	"2 the Beat" (featuring B. James and Monk Kaza)	4:06
11.	"Wanted"	3:10
12.	"Hustle Game"	2:20
13.	"RiffRaff (Skit)"	0:40
14.	"In My Blood" (featuring B. James)	3:55
15.	"Bad Man" (featuring Papa Reu)	1:36
Total length:		41:52

== Personnel ==
- Bido 1 - Engineer, Production Coordination
- Oscar White - Mastering, Mixing

== Charts ==
Chart (2010)	Peak positions
US Top R&B/Hip Hop Albums	50
