= Love, Inc. (TV series) =

American television sitcom

- Title card
- Genre: Sitcom
- Created by: Andrew Secunda
- Starring: Busy Philipps; Vince Vieluf; Reagan Gomez-Preston; Ion Overman; Holly Robinson Peete
- Theme music composer: Kurt Farquhar; Christopher Taylor; Mika Lett
- Composers: Kurt Farquhar; Steve Hopkins
- Country of origin: United States
- Original language: English
- No. of seasons: 1
- No. of episodes: 22

Production
- Executive producers: Adam Chase; Warren Littlefield; Mark Burg; Oren Koules
- Production locations: Paramount Studios (Hollywood, Los Angeles, California)
- Camera setup: Multi-camera
- Running time: 20–22 minutes
- Production companies: Chase TV; The Littlefield Company; Burg/Koules Television; Paramount Network Television

Original release
- Network: UPN
- Release: September 22, 2005 – May 11, 2006

Love, Inc. is an American television sitcom created by Andrew Secunda, which originally aired for one season on UPN from September 22, 2005, to May 11, 2006. With an ensemble cast led by Busy Philipps, Vince Vieluf, Reagan Gomez-Preston, Ion Overman and Holly Robinson Peete, the show revolves around five matchmakers working at a dating agency. The series was produced by Chase TV, the Littlefield Company, Burg/Koules Television, and Paramount Television. It was distributed by UPN in its original run and later by LivingTV and Nelonen in the United Kingdom and Finland respectively. The executive producers were Adam Chase, Warren Littlefield, Mark Burg and Oren Koules.

The series was originally developed as a vehicle and sitcom debut for Shannen Doherty under the working title Wingwoman. Though picked up by UPN, Doherty was removed from the project at the request of the network due to her poor reception by preview audiences; she was replaced by Philipps. The show was set in New York City, but filming took place at Paramount Studios in Hollywood, Los Angeles and other locations in California. It included contemporary hip hop music and was promoted heavily by UPN to attract an urban audience, and to that end it was paired with Everybody Hates Chris as its lead-in on Thursday nights.

Love, Inc. suffered from low viewership despite its high ratings among young Hispanic women; it was canceled following UPN's merger with the WB to relaunch and rebrand as the CW in 2006. The series' cancellation, along with that of other black sitcoms, was criticized by media outlets for reducing representation of African American characters and the amount of roles for African American actors on television. Critical response to Love, Inc. was mixed; some critics praised its multi-ethnic cast, while others felt that the storylines and characters were unoriginal and Philipps' portrayal of her character was unsympathetic.

== Premise ==
Set in New York City, the dating agency Love, Inc. features a staff of single friends desperately looking for love. Newly divorced Clea Lavoy, the founder and owner of the company, seeks out the help of her friend and employee Denise Johnson to reignite her romantic life. She struggles continually to find love despite Denise's best attempts. The future of the agency is jeopardized since its success relied on advertising Clea's "successful", nearly decade-long marriage. Love, Inc. also includes the receptionist Viviana, the style expert Francine, and the technician and photographer Barry.

Episodes typically depict the inner workings of the agency, such as their first experience with a lesbian client, a consultation with a former priest, and marketing strategies to appeal to geeks and agoraphobes. Hired as wingmen for their clients, the employees act as "guardian angels for the conversationally challenged". Each of the characters has various comedic and romantic adventures outside the agency, like Viviana's search for an eligible United States citizen to marry to secure a green card and Denise's inability to find true love despite her talent in matching her clients with their "seemingly unattainable soulmates".

== Characters ==
The series features the following five main characters throughout its run:

- Busy Philipps as Denise Johnson, a dating consultant and self-described expert at matchmaking, who provides her clients with "come-on lines to use and avoid; wardrobe and grooming hints, and conversation starters and stoppers". Despite being characterized as "the Kung Fu master at setting up freaks", she struggles to find her own true love. After being contacted by her ex-boyfriend to find his perfect match, she becomes cynical about dating and love, saying "I've been Wing Womaning my butt off". Philipps described the character's love life as a "complete disaster".
- Vince Vieluf as Barry, Denise's roommate and co-worker who serves as the agency's technician and photographer. Described as an "idiot savant", he is characterized as a conspiracy theorist who experiences paranoia about everything from dentists to toothpaste companies. He frequently communicates through "head-scratching non sequiturs", leading the characters to perceive him as "operat[ing] on a whole other level ... and sometimes on a whole other planet". Vieluf said the character was pitched as "the only guy on the show" and "the luckiest guy in the world".
- Reagan Gomez-Preston as Francine, the agency style expert, who encourages her clients to use and trust their fashion as a way to find a partner. She is introduced criticizing Clea's outfit as belonging to a coach for a women's basketball team and is characterized as the hip worker at the agency. Francine's storylines were not fully developed and "remain[ed] a bit of a mystery" by the end of the show. According to Vieluf, Francine communicates through a "whole different language" and has a special bond with Barry because of their different approaches to life.
- Ion Overman as Viviana, the Argentinian receptionist who "solicits personal information in a rather startling way". She is constantly searching for an eligible American citizen to marry to secure a green card. Her heavy accent is used as a source of humor on the show, which led the Chicago Tribune to accuse the show's writers of reducing the character to an ethnic stereotype.
- Holly Robinson Peete as Clea Lavoy, the founder and owner of the Love, Inc. dating agency. Clea is "thrust into the dating world" following the end of her nearly decade-long marriage, during which her husband has an affair with a younger woman. She is involved in several relationships over the course of the series, such as dating a former priest and having an on-and-off relationship with David. She has a close friendship with her employees, particularly with Denise.

== Production ==
Love, Inc. was developed with the working title Wing Woman and promoted as a "new 'Hitch'-esque comedy". The show's concept was based on an article in The New York Times that discussed dating services. Production was handled by Chase TV, the Littlefield Company, Burg/Koules Television, and Paramount Television. The Littlefield Company suggested that the show's creator, Andrew Secunda, collaborate with executive producer Adam Chase, who had previously worked on Friends. Marta Kauffman, Liz Tuccillo, Mark Burg and Oren Koules also contributed to the series as executive producers. On April 12, 2005, United Paramount Network (UPN) announced that Doherty was in talks for the lead role while Reagan Gomez-Preston was being considered for the role of the lead character's "longtime friend, co-worker and roommate" and Ion Overman for an unspecified part. Overman said that she was attracted to the part since she was searching for a job and viewed the series as a "very cool concept". On April 18, Holly Robinson Peete was confirmed to have joined the cast as the boss to Doherty's character.

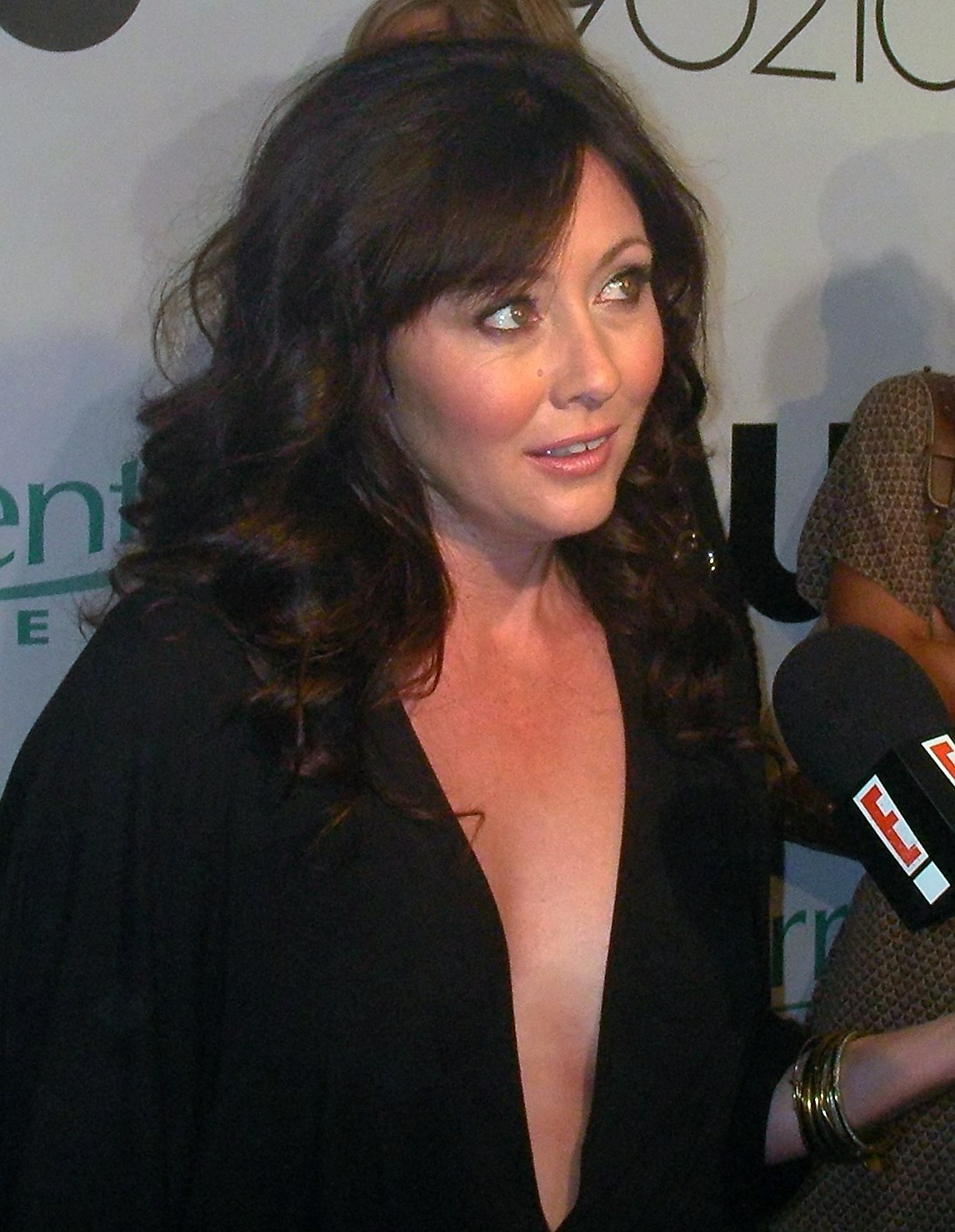
Love, Inc. was originally designed as a vehicle for Shannen Doherty, but she was replaced at the request of UPN.

The series was originally designed as a star vehicle for Doherty, who portrayed Denise Johnson in the unaired pilot. Denise was Doherty's first role in a television sitcom. Doherty said that she loved the script for the pilot immediately, describing it as "hysterical", but felt intimidated by the role given her inexperience with comedy. The series was marketed initially as featuring Doherty and Peete, before UPN announced that it would pick up the show on the condition that Doherty was removed and the character was recast. According to TV Guide, Doherty was poorly received by preview audiences. When asked about Doherty's removal from the show, executive producer Warren Littlefield said the actress was "fabulous" in the role. He believed Doherty wanted to change her negative reputation from leaving Beverly Hills, 90210 and Charmed by acting on the show. Peete praised her performance saying "we had so much fun and such a great vibe". UPN Entertainment's president cited the rationale behind Doherty's departure using the "standard going-in-a-different-direction reason". Rachel Cericola of TV Fodder listed Love, Inc. as one of the "four promising sitcoms for the upcoming TV season" as a result of the behind the scenes drama involving Doherty's replacement.

UPN announced that Busy Philipps was cast as Denise on July 25, and was later billed as the show's star. In her 2018 memoir, Philipps said she was initially reluctant to play the part due to UPN's treatment of Doherty, writing: "they had decided to replace her only after they had trotted her out at the up-fronts and used her for publicity, which I thought was a fairly shitty thing to do". According to Vince Vieluf, the casting change from Doherty to Philipps led to the series being retooled as an ensemble show featuring all the members of the agency rather than focusing on Denise. Vieluf said the alterations in the series' premise were due to concerns that "people would get tired of a show that was only about the mishaps of one person's love life".

Page Kennedy reported that he was considered for a part on the show, but rejected it for the role of Caleb Applewhite on the second season of the ABC drama Desperate Housewives. Retired Los Angeles Lakers player Rick Fox guest-starred in three episodes as David, one of Clea's love interests. Meghan Markle appeared in the episode "One on One" as a subway station worker. The casting of racially diverse actors was identified with UPN's position as "the only network to actively program for an African American audience". Tim Good of the San Francisco Chronicle pointed to the show's casting as the only way in which it acts as a "positive reference".

Even though the show was set in New York City, filming took place in the Bluhdorn Building at Paramount Studios in Hollywood, and used the multiple-camera format. Aaron Korsh wrote the nineteenth episode as freelance work. Each episode title, with the exception of the pilot, was taken from the names of past sitcoms. Transitions between scenes feature images of New York City set to contemporary music, such as The Black Eyed Peas' 2005 single "Don't Phunk with My Heart" and Kelis' 2003 single "Milkshake". Todd R. Ramlow of PopMatters described the music as a further attempt to appeal to "an 'urban', black-white audience," and praised it as a "nice try at crossover for a network whose shows usually target a black demographic".

== Episodes ==
No.	Title	Directed by	Written by	Original release date	US viewers (millions)
1	"Pilot"	Rob Schiller	Andrew Secunda	September 22, 2005	4.61
After being contacted by her ex-boyfriend, Denise Johnson grows excited about the possibility that they will re-kindle their romance. She is disappointed to discover that he instead wants to use her skills as an expert matchmaker to find a new partner. The staff of Love, Inc. band together to help their boss Clea Lavoy adjust to single life after her husband Daniel divorces her to pursue a relationship with a much younger woman.
2	"Living Single"	Rob Schiller	Robert Peacock	September 29, 2005	3.85
Denise and Francine collaborate in an attempt to help Clea distance herself from Daniel and move forward with her life. Following their discovery that Daniel's new fiancé is having an affair with another man, Denise and Francine disagree on the best way to handle the situation. Barry develops a crush on his client.
3	"Mad About You"	Ellen Gittelsohn	Maggie Bandur	October 6, 2005	3.23
Denise believes she has met her soulmate on a subway platform, leading her to return repeatedly to the station to find him. The staff of Love, Inc. are conflicted as to the best way to handle a demanding client who only agrees to date men who fulfill her extensive list of requirements.
4	"Bosom Buddies"	Arlene Sanford	Maggie Bandur	October 13, 2005	3.92
Denise's new boyfriend Grey invites her to his birthday party for their second date. At the party, she becomes increasingly confused and paranoid as he keeps disappearing throughout the night. Clea assigns Viviana to arrange a date for the agency's first lesbian client.
5	"Family Ties"	Sheldon Epps	Sarah Fitzgerald	October 20, 2005	3.14
While working with an older, white man under the delusion that he is hip, Francine discovers that he is more interested in dating her than finding a potential match. Denise grows attracted to a veterinarian and lies to him about her dislike for animals to make herself more appealing to him.
6	"Amen"	Sheldon Epps	Laurie Parres	October 27, 2005	3.08
Clea feels conflicted about her date with Father John, a former priest from her church who renounced his vows to search for love. When the date becomes more intimate, Clea becomes hesitant about the future of their relationship. Denise and Barry help a man acclimate to his life after prison by encouraging him to search for his possible soulmate.
7	"Hope & Faith"	Arlene Sanford	Elana Berkowitz	November 3, 2005	2.98
Clea reveals to the staff of Love, Inc. that her ex-husband frequently criticized her for not being spontaneous enough. The staff attempts to make Clea less serious. Denise and Barry try to encourage a client to overcome his anxiety and go on a second date with a woman he cares about deeply.
8	"Thick & Thin"	Katy Garretson	Michael Curtis	November 10, 2005	2.79
Denise reunites with her former college friend, who had recently lost a dramatic amount of weight, and rejects all of Denise's advice and concerns. As Clea feels more attracted to her boyfriend David, she becomes paranoid after finding out he has a female roommate.
9	"One on One"	Steve Zuckerman	Clarence Livingston	November 17, 2005	3.79
After discovering that David has a highly competitive personality, Clea attempts to find something at which she can beat him. Denise and Barry help a client to connect with a woman who works behind a bulletproof window at a subway station.
10	"The Honeymooners"	Katy Garretson	Sean Conroy	November 24, 2005	1.75
Clea convinces Denise to spend Thanksgiving with her to avoid feeling lonely. Clea becomes increasingly attached to Denise over the course of the day. Francine and Barry encourage a client to propose to his partner.
11	"Three's Company"	Arlene Sanford	Elana Berkowitz	December 15, 2005	2.97
Viviana accepts a marriage proposal from a younger man, but feels conflicted when her ex-boyfriend returns to rekindle their relationship. The agency begins to market its services towards geeks, and Barry and Francine experience difficulty arranging dates for a trio of clients.
12	"Arrested Development"	John Fortenberry	Laurie Parres	January 19, 2006	2.19
Francine is confronted by her mother over her friendship with her biological father who abandoned her a child. Denise and Barry help a 12-year-old child arrange a date with his crush.
13	"Grace Under Fire"	Steve Zuckerman	Robert Peacock	February 2, 2006	2.34
Denise, Clea, and Francine discover that Barry was enrolled previously in the military after his former Army commander, Major Curtis, recruits him for a secret mission. Denise loses the phone number of the man she met on the subway platform, but meets another man with the same name, causing her to consider dating him instead.
14	"Hello, Larry"	Steve Zuckerman	Maggie Bandur	February 9, 2006	2.72
Denise, Francine, and Barry are angry at their clients' demands for the perfect Valentine's Day dates. Clea plans a party for her employees and clients to appease them. The clients riot after overhearing the staff call the party "The Losers' Ball". Clea feels neglected by David, causing her to agree to go on a date with Larry.
15	"Major Dad"	Steve Zuckerman	Robert Peacock	February 16, 2006	2.48
Major Curtis recruits the agency to find a suitable match for his daughter Molly. They discover Molly is secretly dating a much older man and attempt to break up that relationship. Clea struggles with whether or not she should tell David about kissing Larry.
16	"Curb Your Enthusiasm"	Henry Chan	Sean Conroy	March 2, 2006	2.40
Denise recruits Francine to change her new boyfriend Mike into a perfect partner. Clea and Viviana use Barry as a fake date to get revenge on a difficult client who has an offensive sense of humor.
17	"Anything But Love"	Steve Zuckerman	Andrew Secunda	March 23, 2006	2.47
Clea and Viviana help the agoraphobic Jamie meet his perfect match with a woman who accepts his anxiety disorder. After discovering Jamie is lying about his condition, Clean and Viviana threaten to tell Charlene the truth if he keeps being dishonest. Barry attempts to leave his girlfriend after discovering that she uses dating books to manipulate their relationship.
18	"Cursed"	Steve Zuckerman	Emily Cutler	April 13, 2006	1.92
Confused about her relationship with David, Clea seeks advice from Viviana's psychic, Denise's therapist, and Barry. Francine is turned off when she finds out that her date cries too much.
19	"Fired Up"	Kevin Bright	Aaron Korsh	April 20, 2006	2.77
A jealous Francine confronts Denise for spending all of her free time with Mike instead of her. Barry and Vivana attempt to help Eric, a fireman with hero syndrome.
20	"Full House"	Steve Zuckerman	Richard Goodman	April 27, 2006	1.91
Denise tutors Viviana, who must pass a college course to extend her student visa and avoid deportation. Viviana disagrees with Denise's strict teaching style, and asks Francine for help instead. After winning entry into the Tri-State tournament in Atlantic City, Barry turns to Clea for support.
21	"Dream On"	Sheldon Epps	Clarence Livingston	May 4, 2006	1.98
Barry announces to his co-workers that he will be using his winnings from the poker tournament to help one of them achieve their dreams. Everyone competes for his attention, and Denise questions if she has a dream of her own. Clea attempts to educate a client on how to recognize and respond to signs of interest from members of the opposite sex.
22	"Friends"	Steve Zuckerman	Andrew Secunda	May 11, 2006	2.01
Denise feels conflicted when Mike asks her to move in with him. The staff of Love, Inc. disagree over the best method a client should use to confess his attraction for his friend.

== Broadcast history ==
On August 6, 2005, UPN officially ordered thirteen episodes of the series. The network later ordered a full season of twenty-two episodes of the show on November 7, 2005, amid speculation that it would be canceled. In 2006, LivingTV broadcast the series in the United Kingdom, and it was broadcast by Nelonen in Finland in 2008. UPN paired the series with Everybody Hates Chris, Eve, and Cuts to attract an "urban" audience. The network moved WWE SmackDown to Fridays in favor of scheduling Thursdays as focused on sitcoms. This decision was made to establish a "night of scripted programming" and to attract more advertising from film studios to promote upcoming releases. Today questioned the network's belief that Love, Inc. and Everybody Hates Chris would appeal to the same viewership, and noted the difference in quality between the two, with Love, Inc. cited as the inferior show. While the series retained 59% of the audience from Everybody Hates Chris initially, this marketing strategy proved unsuccessful when it lost a majority of the viewership in later episodes.

Cericola reported that Love, Inc. earned an average of 3.6 million viewers per episode and an article in The Hollywood Reporter stated that the series garnered an average of 1.0/3 Nielsen rating/share in the 18–49 demographic. It ranked 141st among broadcast television networks in the 2005–2006 television season. According to the Nielsen Company, the show achieved high ratings among "Latina adolescents Ages 12–17" and earned 3.4 million viewers in that demographic in 2005. It ranked above two other UPN sitcoms: One on One and Half & Half for Latin women in the 12–17 age demographic, and in "the top half of all UPN series" for total viewership. The series premiere saw a 6% increase in the 18–49 age range, 53% in women between 18 and 34, and 118% in women between 18 and 49 from the show that aired in the same time period during the previous television season.

The show, as well as a majority of UPN's programs, were officially canceled as a result of the network's merger with the WB Television Network (the WB) to form the CW in 2006. Fern Gillespie of The Crisis was critical of UPN's decision to cancel the series given how the network "in one swoop, wiped out five of its eight African American comedies" for the creation of the CW. Gillespie expressed disappointment at the lack of African American sitcoms on the three major networks saying: "Without that opportunity for some of the younger artists to hone and develop their skills, it will potentially have a generational impact." Critic Tim Goodman identified Love, Inc. as one of six shows "geared for an African American audience" and featuring "an African American lead actress" that were canceled during the merger. He equated these cancellations as a sign of networks "eliminat[ing] niche programming". The series has not been made available on Blu-ray or DVD.

== Critical reception ==
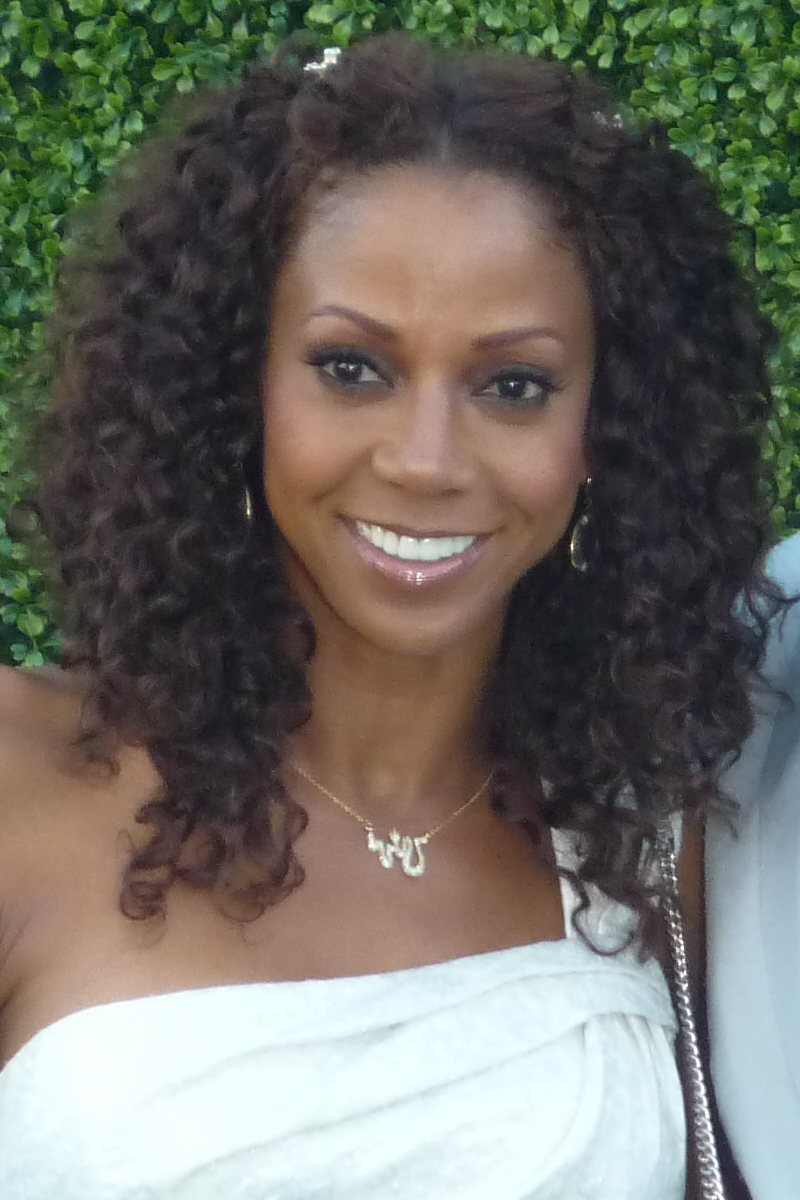
Holly Robinson Peete was nominated for an NAACP Image Award for her role in the series.

Love, Inc. received mixed critical feedback when it was first broadcast. Ebony's Zondra Hughes included the show in its list of promising prime-time television shows featuring African-American actors, and identified Peete and Overman as its primary "star appeal". While reviewing its broadcast on LivingTV, a reviewer from Daily Record listed the show as its "pick of the day" and suggested it for viewers who "fancy a giggle". Diane Werts of Newsday found the characters to be "vibrantly well-defined" and the writing "smart, with a light touch". Peete received a nomination for the NAACP Image Award for Outstanding Actress in a Comedy Series in the 37th NAACP Image Awards, but lost to Tichina Arnold who starred in Everybody Hates Chris. According to Philipps, Quentin Tarantino is a fan of the series.

Metacritic assigned a score of 28 out of 100 based on aggregate of 17 reviews, indicating "generally unfavorable reviews". The Futon Critic's Brian Ford Sullivan praised Vieluf as the standout despite his limited role, but felt the execution of the matchmaking premise was inferior to that done in the 2005 film Hitch. The series was described as having "a quirky vibe, personable cast and snappy writing" by Variety's Laura Fries, but she felt the storylines and characters required more original material. Although they commended the show for its multi-ethnic cast, Jon Bonné and Gael Fashingbauer Cooper of Today wrote that it "struggles to salvage some screechingly bad jokes". Paul Brownfield of the Los Angeles Times criticized the series for being "unintentionally unfunny", comparing it to the fictional sitcom Room and Bored featured in the HBO comedy drama The Comeback. The Chicago Tribune's Maureen Ryan called the series a "grating comedy ... destined to be a footnote in history as the show that premiered after Everybody Hates Chris, and most likely faded shortly thereafter".

Critics responded negatively to the character of Denise and Philipps' performance, citing both as annoying and unsympathetic. Heffernan found that Denise lacked the charm and charisma of Cher Horowitz from the 1995 film Clueless. USA Today's Robert Bianco gave the series a half of a point out of four, and summarized Philipps' performance as "constant motion; her face contorting, body twitching, voice braying" that transformed the show into something "truly unbearable". Citing the series as a "one-joke affair", Matthew Gilbert of The Boston Globe wrote that the premise behind Denise had the "same irony that failed to make Alicia Silverstone's Miss Match very interesting". The Pittsburgh Post-Gazette's Rob Owen favored Doherty's portrayal of the character, which he described as "brimming with self-confidence," and characterized Philipps' Denise as a "dizzyingly neurotic nutcase". Ramlow asserted that the show's female characters were "needy and desperate" and "one-shtick ponies" in comparison to those from Sex and the City.
