= Black Roulette =

Studio album by DMG
- Released: January 28, 2003
- Studio: Hippie House Studios (Houston, TX); Knockhard Studios (Houston, TX)
- Genre: Hardcore hip-hop; gangsta rap
- Length: 43:20
- Label: Rap-A-Lot Resurrection
- Producer: Domo; Mr. Lee; Swift

DMG chronology
| Rigormortiz (1993) | Black Roulette (2003) |

Black Roulette is the second and final studio album by American rapper DMG. It was released on January 28, 2003, through Rap-A-Lot Resurrection. The recording sessions took place at Hippie House Studios and Knockhard Studios in Houston. Produced by Domo, Mr. Lee and Jon "Swift" Catalon, it features guest appearances from K.B., G-Moné, Mad Dog, Man Child and Yukmouth.

== Track listing ==
| No. | Title | Writer(s) | Producer(s) | Length |
|---|---|---|---|---|
| 1. | "All Balls, No Brains" | Harold Armstrong; Leroy Williams | Mr. Lee | 4:32 |
| 2. | "A.N.B" | Armstrong; Williams | Mr. Lee | 3:40 |
| 3. | "Mind Games" | Armstrong; Michael Poye | Domo | 2:25 |
| 4. | "I Wish" | Armstrong; Poye | Domo | 3:45 |
| 5. | "My Destiny" | Armstrong; Williams | Mr. Lee | 3:40 |
| 6. | "If I Only Knew" | Armstrong; Williams | Mr. Lee | 4:05 |
| 7. | "Headhunter" (featuring G. Mone and Yukmouth) | Armstrong; Gary Talley; Jerold Ellis; Poye | Domo | 3:47 |
| 8. | "No Friends" | Armstrong; Poye | Domo | 2:27 |
| 9. | "Nigga Luck" (featuring Mad Dog) | Armstrong; Poye | Domo | 3:34 |
| 10. | "Who Am I?" | Armstrong; John Catalon | Swift | 3:48 |
| 11. | "Ghetto Been Good 2 Me" | Armstrong; Poye | Domo | 4:00 |
| 12. | "Too Long" (featuring K.B. and Man Child) | Armstrong; Kevin Brown; Herbert Cross; Catalon | Swift | 3:37 |
| Total length: | | | | 43:20 |

== Personnel ==
- Harold "DMG" Armstrong – main artist
- Gary "G Mone" Talley – featured artist (track 7)
- Jerold "Yukmouth" Ellis – featured artist (track 7)
- Mad Dog – featured artist (track 9)
- Kevin "K.B." Brown – featured artist (track 12)
- Herbert "Manchild" Cross – featured artist (track 12)
- Leroy "Mr. Lee" Williams – producer (tracks: 1, 2, 5, 6)
- Michael "Domo" Poye – producer (tracks: 3, 4, 7–9, 11)
- John "Swift" Catalon – producer (tracks: 10, 12)
- James "J Prince" Smith – executive producer
