= Piece of Mind (Tela album) =

Studio album by Tela
- Released: November 5, 1996
- Recorded: 1996
- Studio: House Of Blues Studios; Digital Services (Houston, TX); Crosstown Studios (Memphis, TN); Jus-Fresh Studio (Houston, TX)
- Genre: Southern hip hop; gangsta rap; hardcore hip hop; g-funk
- Length: 1:00:26
- Label: Suave House Records; Relativity Records
- Producer: James Endsley (exec.); Tony Draper (exec.); DJ Slice Tee; Ensayne Wayne; Jazze Pha; Tela; T-Mix

Tela chronology
Piece of Mind (1996)	Now or Never (1998)

Singles from Piece of Mind
- 1. "Sho Nuff" Released: 1996

Professional ratings
Review scores
Source	Rating
AllMusic	3/5 stars
The Source	3.5/5 stars

Piece of Mind is the debut album by American rapper Tela. It was released on November 5, 1996, through Suave House/Relativity Records. Production was handled by Tela himself with DJ Slice T, Jazze Pha, T-Mix and Insane Wayne. It features guest appearances from 8Ball & MJG, Crime Boss, South Circle and NOLA. The album peaked at number 70 on the Billboard 200 and number 17 on the Top R&B/Hip-Hop Albums. Its lead single, "Sho Nuff", peaked at No. 58 on the Billboard Hot 100.

== Track listing ==
No.	Title	Producer(s)	Length
1.	"Intro"	Slice T; Tela	2:53
2.	"Twisted"	Slice T; Tela	4:26
3.	"Tired of Ballin"	Jazze Pha; Tela	5:00
4.	"Strange" (featuring Mr. Mike and Crime Boss)	T-Mix; Tela	4:18
5.	"Success"	Slice T; Tela	5:03
6.	"Let It Rain"	Tela	4:14
7.	"Sho Nuff" (featuring 8Ball & MJG)	Jazze Pha; Tela	4:05
8.	"Time"	Slice T; Tela	1:57
9.	"Blackhaven"	Slice T; Tela	4:44
10.	"Suave House" (featuring Nola)	Slice T; Tela	6:07
11.	"Cell Call (Interlude)"	Slice T; Tela	1:32
12.	"U Can't Tell"	Slice T; Tela	6:26
13.	"All About That Money"	Slice T; Jazze Pha; Ensayne Wayne; Tela	1:39
14.	"Survival"	Slice T; Tela	3:51
15.	"Piece of Mind"	Slice T; Tela	4:11
Total length:			1:00:26

== Personnel ==
- Winston "Tela" Rogers – main artist, producer, mixing
- Mr. Mike Walls – featured artist (track 3)
- Thurston "Crime Boss" Slaughter – featured artist (track 3)
- Premro "8Ball" Smith – featured artist (track 7)
- Marlon "MJG" Goodwin – featured artist (track 7)
- Toni Hickman – featured artist (track 10)
- Tylene Mercadel – featured artist (track 10)
- Suns Of Soul – additional vocals (tracks: 1, 15)
- Tyree Robinson – additional vocals (track 2)
- Phalon "Jazze Pha" Alexander – additional vocals (tracks: 3, 5, 7, 10, 12, 13), keyboards (tracks: 3, 7), drum programming (track 3), producer (tracks: 3, 7, 13)
- Thomas "Low Key" McCollum – additional vocals (track 4)
- Marcus McRee – additional vocals (tracks: 5, 9, 13, 14)
- Mac Rodd – additional vocals (tracks: 6, 12)
- Mista Rodd – additional vocals (tracks: 6, 12)
- Nathaniel Malone – additional vocals (track 6)
- The Care Bear – additional vocals (track 9)
- B. McRay – additional vocals (track 13)
- Baby Dre – additional vocals (tracks: 13, 14)
- Gee-Kay – additional vocals (track 13)
- L. McRay – additional vocals (track 13)
- Mr. Rob – additional vocals (track 13)
- Sheldon "Slice T" Arrington – keyboards, drum programming, producer (tracks: 1, 2, 5, 8–15), mixing
- Niko Lyras – guitar (track 1), acoustic guitar (track 12)
- Neal Jones – guitar (track 2), bass (tracks: 1, 7, 9), engineering (tracks: 1–3, 5–14), mixing
- Lawrence Long – guitar (track 4)
- Tristan "T-Mix" Jones – keyboards & producer (track 4)
- Adam Warren – guitar (track 9)
- Derrel Harris – Rhodes piano & drums (track 9)
- Ferrell "Ensayne Wayne" Miles – producer (track 13)
- Roger Tausz – mixing
- Clay "Jus Fresh" James – engineering
- Tony Dawsey – mastering
- James Endsley – executive producer
- Tony Draper – executive producer
- Pen & Pixel – artwork, design

== Charts ==
Chart (1996)	Peak position
US Billboard 200	70
US Top R&B/Hip-Hop Albums (Billboard)	17

== Samples ==
Twisted

- "Rock Box" by Run DMC and "Computer Love" by Zapp
