= The World Is Yours (Scarface album) =

Studio album by Scarface
- Released: August 17, 1993
- Genre: Hip-hop
- Length: 69:48
- Labels: Rap-A-Lot; Priority
- Producers: N.O. Joe; James Smith; John Bido

Scarface chronology
Mr. Scarface Is Back (1991)	The World Is Yours (1993)	The Diary (1994)

Singles from The World Is Yours
- 1. "Let Me Roll" Released: August 17, 1993; 2. "Now I Feel Ya" Released: 1993

Professional ratings
Review scores
Source	Rating
AllMusic	3/5 stars
Entertainment Weekly	B
Rolling Stone	2/5 stars
The Rolling Stone Album Guide	3/5 stars
Vibe	(favorable)

The World Is Yours is the second studio album by American rapper Scarface. It was released on August 17, 1993, by Rap-A-Lot Records and Priority Records. The album was not as acclaimed as his debut, Mr. Scarface Is Back, but sold strongly, breaking into the Top 10 on the Billboard 200 chart, and peaking at number 1 on the R&B/hip hop album chart. "Let Me Roll" became a Billboard Hot 100 hit in 1993. The album was certified Gold by the RIAA on October 20, 1993.

== Track listing ==
No.	Title	Producer(s)	Length
1.	"Intro"	N.O. Joe	1:05
2.	"Lettin' 'Em Know"	N.O. Joe	5:16
3.	"Comin' Agg"	N.O. Joe	3:29
4.	"The Wall"	N.O. Joe	4:37
5.	"Let Me Roll" (featuring J. Prince)	Scarface	4:53
6.	"You Don't Hear Me Doe" (featuring DMG)	N.O. Joe	3:57
7.	"One Time (Interlude)"	N.O. Joe	1:27
8.	"Dying with Your Boots On"	N.O. Joe	2:34
9.	"I Need a Favor (Interlude)"	James Smith; John Bido	3:27
10.	"Still That Aggin"	Scarface	5:16
11.	"Strictly for the Funk Lovers"	N.O. Joe	6:09
12.	"Now I Feel Ya"	James Smith; John Bido	7:32
13.	"Funky Lil Aggin" (featuring 2 Low)	N.O. Joe	4:20
14.	"Mr. Scarface, Part III: The Final Chapter"	James Smith; John Bido	4:31
15.	"He's Dead"	N.O. Joe	5:21
16.	"I'm Black"	N.O. Joe	4:23
17.	"Outro"	N.O. Joe	1:18
Total length:			69:48

== Charts ==
=== Weekly charts ===
Chart (1993)	Peak position
US Billboard 200	7
US Top R&B/Hip-Hop Albums (Billboard)	1

=== Year-end charts ===
Chart (1993)	Position
US Top R&B/Hip-Hop Albums (Billboard)	20
Chart (1994)	Position
US Top R&B/Hip-Hop Albums (Billboard)	90

== Certifications ==
Region	Certification	Certified units/sales
United States (RIAA)	Gold	500,000^{^}
^{^} Shipments figures based on certification alone.

== See also ==
- List of number-one R&B albums of 1993 (U.S.)
