= Ion Overman =

American actress

- Born: Los Angeles, California, U.S.
- Occupation: Actress
- Years active: 1995–present

Ion Overman is an American actress, known for her roles on television, such as Gabriella Garza in Port Charles (2000–2002), Candace Jewell in The L Word (2004–2005), Detective Sam Blair in Ghost Whisperer (2008–2010) and Detective Elena Ruiz in Wisdom of the Crowd (2017–2018).

== Early life ==
Overman was born in Los Angeles, California. Overman's mother is black and her father is white of English heritage from the United Kingdom. At the age of thirteen, she made her debut at the Chip Fields Repertory Theater. She graduated from University of California, Los Angeles and landed her first agent in 1993.

== Career ==
Overman made her acting debut in the 1995 movie The Walking Dead. In 2000, she was cast as Gabriela Garza in the ABC daytime soap opera General Hospital, a character who also appeared in the General Hospital spinoff Port Charles. She left the role in 2002. She later went to appear in a guest starring roles on the number of prime time television series, include Strong Medicine, The Drew Carey Show and CSI: Crime Scene Investigation. From 2004 to 2005, she had a recurring role as Candace Jewell in the Showtime drama series The L Word.

From 2005 to 2006, Overman starred in the UPN sitcom Love Inc. The series was canceled after single season. She has appeared in the 2006 comedy film Phat Girlz and played Linda, Josh's (Derek Luke) elitist and corrupt fiance in Tyler Perry's 2009 comedy-drama Madea Goes to Jail. In 2013, Ion starred in the Tunnel Vision as the detective trying to find the murderer and who befriends the murdered family's patriarch, who also barely survived being murdered.

Overman had a recurring role on Ghost Whisperer from 2008 to 2010 playing Det. Sam Blair. She also had a recurring arc on Desperate Housewives playing Maria Scott during season five. She also has appeared on Two and a Half Men, Castle and NCIS. From 2017 to 2018, Overman co-starred as Det. Elena Ruiz on the CBS drama series, Wisdom of the Crowd.

== Filmography ==
=== Film ===
Year	Title	Role	Notes
1995	The Walking Dead	Shirley Evans	
1999	Smiling Fish and Goat on Fire	Party Girl #1	
2006	Phat Girlz	Flirty Waitress	
2007	Heart to Heart		Short film
2009	Madea Goes to Jail	Linda Davis	Also known as Tyler Perry's Madea Goes to Jail
2013	Tunnel Vision	Detective Cynthia Grier	

=== Television ===
Year	Title	Role	Notes
1999	Beverly Hills, 90210	Woman #1	Episode: "How to Be the Jerk Women Love"
2000–2002	Port Charles	Gabriella Garza	205 episodes
2004	The L Word	Candace Jewell	5 Episodes
2005	The Young and the Restless	Officer Contreras	4 episodes
2007	Two and a Half Men	Vicki	Episode: "Is There a Mrs. Waffles?" (Season 5, Episode 8)
2008	Ghost Whisperer	Det. Sam Blair	9 episodes
2009	Desperate Housewives	Maria Scott	Season 5, Episodes: 14, 15 and 16
2011	The Secret Life of the American Teenager	Ollie	Season 3, Episodes 19 and 24, Season 4, Episode 7
2012	NCIS	Jane Thomas	Season 9, Episode 13
