= Facemob =

American hip hop group

- Origin: Houston, Texas, United States
- Genres: Hip hop
- Years active: 1995–2002
- Labels: Rap-A-Lot
- Past members: 350; DMG; Devin the Dude; Chi-Ray; Smit-D

Facemob was an American hip hop group put together by rapper Scarface. The group consisted of 350, DMG, Devin the Dude, Chi-Ray and Smit-D, with Scarface producing and writing songs for the group's debut album.

The group first made an uncredited appearance on Scarface's 1995 single "Among the Walking Dead" from the Walking Dead soundtrack album, but the group's first official appearance came later in the year on the Tales from the Hood soundtrack album on the self-titled song "Face Mob". Facemob also appeared on the soundtrack albums for Original Gangstas and High School High before releasing their debut album, The Other Side of the Law, which peaked at 51 on the Billboard 200. After a four-year hiatus, the group (minus Devin the Dude) returned in 2002 with the release of their second and final album, Silence.

== Discography ==
=== Studio albums ===
Title	Release	Peak chart positions	
Title	Release	US	US R&B
The Other Side of the Law	Released: August 7, 1996; Label: Rap-A-Lot	51	6
Silence	Released: November 19, 2002; Label: Rap-A-Lot	—	84
