= Tales from the Hood (soundtrack) =

Tales from the Hood: The Soundtrack

Soundtrack album by Various artists
- Released: May 9, 1995
- Recorded: 1994–1995
- Genres: Horrorcore; gangsta rap
- Length: 52:58
- Label: MCA Records
- Producers: Darin Scott (exec.); Larry Robinson (exec.); Rusty Cundieff (exec.); Spike Lee (exec.); Kathy Nelson (exec.); Lisa Jackson (exec.); Moe ZMD • Ajb; Bokie Loc; Cherokee Chief; Frukwan; Gerald Baillergeau; Inspectah Deck; Kurupt; MC Eiht; Mike Dean; N.O. Joe; Prodeje; Robert "Fonksta" Bacon; Sean "Barney" Thomas; Spice 1; Studio Ton; Tomie Mundy; Too Poetic; Victor Merritt

Singles from Tales from the Hood: The Soundtrack
- 1. "The Hood Got Me Feelin' the Pain" Released: June 27, 1995; 2. "Tales from the Hood" Released: September 5, 1995

Professional ratings
Review scores
Source	Rating
AllMusic	3/5 stars

Tales from the Hood: The Soundtrack is the soundtrack to Rusty Cundieff's 1995 horror film, Tales from the Hood. It was released on May 9, 1995 through MCA Records, and consists of twelve songs by various hip hop music recording artists. The album features performances by the likes of Wu-Tang Clan, Facemob, Gravediggaz, Havoc & Prodeje, MC Eiht, Scarface, Spice 1, Tha Chill, The Click and more. Audio production was handled by several record producers, including Inspectah Deck, Mike Dean, N.O. Joe, Kurupt, and Too Poetic. Spike Lee served as one of six executive producers on the album.

The soundtrack, which consisted entirely of gangsta rap and hardcore hip hop music, made it to number 16 on the Billboard 200 and number 1 on the Top R&B/Hip-Hop Albums.

Domino and Tha Chill's title track, "Tales from the Hood", was the soundtrack's lone charting single, becoming a hit on the Hot Rap Songs chart, where it peaked at #8. The music video features cameos from artists that also performed on the Tales from the Hood soundtrack. Havoc & Prodeje's song "The Hood Got Me Feelin' the Pain" featuring Dawn Green was also released as a single and had a music video produced. The eponymous song by Facemob was later featured on the group's debut album The Other Side of the Law, where it was renamed "Tales from tha Hood."

== Track listing ==
No.	Title	Producer(s)	Length
1.	"Let Me at Them" (performed by Inspectah Deck)	Inspectah Deck	3:39
2.	"Face Mob" (performed by Facemob and Scarface)	N.O. Joe; Mike Dean	3:56
3.	"Tales from the Hood" (performed by Domino and Tha Chill)	Gerald Baillergeau; Victor Merritt	4:17
4.	"Born II Die" (performed by Spice 1)	Moe ZMD; Spice 1	4:35
5.	"Ol' Dirty's Back" (performed by Ol' Dirty Bastard and 12 O'Clock)	Cherokee Chief	4:10
6.	"I'm Talkin' to Myself" (performed by NME and Grench the Mean 1)	Kurupt	5:13
7.	"The Hood Got Me Feelin' the Pain" (performed by Havoc & Prodeje and Dawn Green)	Prodeje; Robert "Fonksta" Bacon; Tomie Mundy	4:19
8.	"One Less Nigga" (performed by MC Eiht)	MC Eiht	4:26
9.	"From the Dark Side" (performed by Gravediggaz)	Gatekeeper; Grym Reaper	3:47
10.	"Death Represents My Hood" (performed by Bokie Loc)	Bokie Loc; Sean "Barney" Thomas	4:24
11.	"Hot Ones Echo Thru the Ghetto" (performed by The Click)	Studio Ton	4:35
12.	"The Grave" (performed by N.G.N. and Killa)	Moe ZMD • Ajb	5:37
Total length:			52:58

== Charts ==
=== Weekly charts ===
Chart (1995)	Peak position
US Billboard 200	16
US Top R&B/Hip-Hop Albums (Billboard)	1

=== Year-end charts ===
Chart (1995)	Position
US Top R&B/Hip-Hop Albums (Billboard)	56

== Certifications ==
Region	Certification	Certified units/sales
United States (RIAA)	Gold	500,000^{^}
^{^} Shipments figures based on certification alone.

== See also ==
- List of Billboard number-one R&B albums of 1995
