= Sho Nuff =

Single by Tela featuring 8Ball & MJG and Jazze Pha

from the album Piece of Mind
- B-side: "Suave House"
- Released: March 11, 1997
- Recorded: 1995–96
- Studio: Crosstown Studios (Memphis, TN)
- Genre: Dirty rap
- Length: 5:10
- Label: Suave House; Relativity
- Songwriters: Winston Rogers; Sheldon Arrington; Phalon Alexander
- Producer: Jazze Pha

Professional ratings
Review scores
Source	Rating
AllMusic	2/5 stars

"Sho Nuff" is a song by American recording artist Tela featuring fellow Southern hip hop duo 8Ball & MJG. It was released on March 11, 1997, through Suave House Records as the lead single from Tela's debut studio album Piece of Mind. Recording sessions took place at Crosstown Studios in Memphis, Tennessee. Production is credited to Tela, DJ Slice T, and Jazze Pha, who also performed the song's hook.

The single became a moderate hit, peaking at number 58 on the Billboard Hot 100 and at number 10 on the Hot Rap Songs, becoming Tela's the only single to reach the Billboard charts.

== Track listing ==
No.	Title	Writer(s)	Producer(s)	Length
1.	"Sho Nuff (Album Version)" (featuring 8Ball, MJG and Jazze Pha)	Winston Rogers; Sheldon Arrington; Phalon Alexander	Jazze Pha; Tela; Slice T
2.	"Sho Nuff (Clean Version)" (featuring 8Ball, MJG and Jazze Pha)	Rogers; Arrington; Alexander	Jazze Pha; Tela; Slice T
3.	"Sho Nuff (Instrumental)"	Rogers; Arrington; Alexander	Jazze Pha; Tela; Slice T
4.	"Suave House" (featuring Jazze Pha)	Rogers; Arrington	Slice T; Tela

== Personnel ==
- Winston "Tela" Rogers – vocals, producer
- Premro "8Ball" Smith – vocals (tracks: 1, 2)
- Marlon "MJG" Goodwin – vocals (tracks: 1, 2)
- Phalon "Jazze Pha" Alexander – additional vocals (tracks: 1, 2, 4), keyboards & producer (tracks: 1–3)
- Neal Jones – bass guitar (tracks: 1–3), engineering
- Sheldon "Slice T" Arrington – keyboards & drum programming (track 4), producer
- Clay "Jus Fresh" James – engineering (track 4)
- Kevin Page – engineering assistant (track 4)
- Tony Dawsey – mastering
- Tony Draper – executive producer, production coordinator
- James Endsley – co-executive producer
- Pen & Pixel Graphics, Inc. – artwork, design, layout

== Charts ==
=== Weekly charts ===
Chart (1997)	Peak position
US Billboard Hot 100	58
US Hot R&B/Hip-Hop Songs (Billboard)	32
US R&B/Hip-Hop Airplay (Billboard)	49
US Hot Rap Songs (Billboard)	10

=== Year-end charts ===
End of year chart (1997)	Position
US Hot Rap Singles (Billboard)	46
