= The Other Side of the Law =

Studio album by Facemob
- Released: August 13, 1996
- Recorded: 1995–96
- Studios: Hippie House Studios (Houston, TX); The Enterprise (Burbank, CA)
- Genres: Southern hip hop; gangsta rap
- Length: 50:30
- Labels: Rap-A-Lot; Noo Trybe
- Producers: Domo; Mike Dean; N.O. Joe; Scarface; Uncle Eddie

Facemob chronology
The Other Side of the Law (1996)	Silence (2002)

Professional ratings
Review scores
Source	Rating
AllMusic	2.5/5 stars
RapReviews	6/10

The Other Side of the Law is the debut studio album by American rap group Facemob. It was released on August 13, 1996, through Rap-A-Lot Records. The recording sessions took place at the Hippie House studios in Houston and at the Enterprise in Burbank. The album was produced by Scarface, Mike Dean, Uncle Eddie, Domo, and N.O. Joe. The album peaked at number 51 on the Billboard 200 and at number 6 on the Top R&B/Hip-Hop Albums in the United States. The song "Rivals" previously appeared on Original Gangstas: The Soundtrack, and the song "Tales from tha Hood" appeared on Tales From The Hood, where it was named "Face Mob."

== Track listing ==
No.	Title	Writer(s)	Producer(s)	Length
1.	"Intro"			0:42
2.	"In the Flesh"	Roderick Darnell Smith; Harold Armstrong; Loretta M. Dorsey; Brad Jordan	Scarface	4:53
3.	"Bank Robbery"	Armstrong; Devin Copeland; Jordan; Michael Dean	Scarface; Mike Dean	5:19
4.	"Da Coldest"	Armstrong; Gene Dorcy; Smith; Jordan; Dean	Scarface; Mike Dean	5:31
5.	"Millions"	Armstrong; Dorcy; Smith; Copeland; Jordan; Eddie Wilson; Dean	Scarface; Uncle Eddie; Mike Dean	5:03
6.	"Tales from tha Hood"	Jordan; Armstrong; Joseph Johnson; Dean	N.O. Joe; Mike Dean	3:56
7.	"Respect Rude"	Armstrong; Dorsey; Smith; Copeland; Jordan	Scarface	5:00
8.	"Stay True"	Copeland; Dorsey; Jordan; Dean	Scarface; Mike Dean	5:16
9.	"The Other Side"	Smith; Copeland; Michael Poye; Wilson	Domo; Uncle Eddie	4:32
10.	"Black Woman"	Smith; Copeland; Jordan; Wilson; Poye; Dean	Scarface; Uncle Eddie; Domo; Mike Dean	5:06
11.	"Rivals"	Armstrong; Dorsey; Smith; Copeland; Jordan	Scarface	4:20
12.	"Outro"			0:52
Total length:				50:30

== Personnel ==
- Devin "The Dude" Copeland – vocals
- Loretta M. "350" Dorsey – vocals
- Harold "DMG" Armstrong – vocals
- Roderick "Smit-D" Smith – vocals
- Chi-Ray/Sha-Riza – vocals
- Brad "Scarface" Jordan – vocals, producer (tracks: 2–5, 7, 8, 10, 11), mixing, executive producer, production coordinator
- Mike Dean – producer (tracks: 3–6, 8, 10), mixing, engineering
- "Uncle Eddie" Wilson – producer (tracks: 5, 9, 10)
- Joseph "N.O. Joe" Johnson – producer (track 6)
- Michael "Domo" Poye – producer (tracks: 9, 10)
- Andre "007" Barnes – engineering assistant
- "Jazzy" Jeff Griffin – engineering assistant
- Anthony Valcic – mastering
- James "J. Prince" Smith – executive producer
- Jason Clark – art direction, design
- Mario Castellanos – photography
- Rodney Wilson – production coordinator

== Charts ==
=== Weekly charts ===
Chart (1996)	Peak position
US Billboard 200	51
US Top R&B/Hip-Hop Albums (Billboard)	6

=== Year-end charts ===
Chart (1996)	Position
US Top R&B/Hip-Hop Albums (Billboard)	90
