= Emeritus (album) =

Studio album by Scarface
- Released: December 2, 2008
- Recorded: 2008
- Studios: M.A.D. Studios (Houston, TX); Dean's List House of Hits (Cypress, TX); The Record Room (North Miami, FL); The Durt Factory Studio (Norfolk, VA); The Ranch Studio (New York, NY)
- Genre: Hip hop
- Labels: J. Prince; Rap-A-Lot 4 Life; Asylum
- Producers: Cool & Dre; Illmind; Jake One; Mike Dean; N.O. Joe; Nottz; Scarface; Scram Jones; Sha Money XL; Tone Capone; Young Cee

Scarface chronology
Made (2007)	Emeritus (2008)	Deeply Rooted (2015)

Emeritus is the tenth solo studio album by American rapper Scarface. Promoted as his final studio album, it was released on December 2, 2008, through J. Prince Entertainment, Rap-A-Lot 4 Life and Asylum Records.

The recording sessions took place at M.A.D. Studios in Houston, Dean's List House of Hits in Cypress, The Record Room in North Miami, The Durt Factory Studio in Norfolk, and The Ranch Studio in New York. The album was produced by N.O. Joe, Illmind, Mike Dean, Nottz, Cool & Dre, Jake One, Scram Jones, Sha Money XL, Tone Capone, Young Cee, and Scarface. It features guest appearances from Wacko, Bilal, Bun B, J. Prince, K-Rino, Lil' Wayne, Papa Reu, Porsha, Slim Thug, Shateish, Takai "Cookie" Hicks, and Z-Ro.

In the United States, the album debuted at number 24 on the Billboard 200, number 4 on the Top R&B/Hip-Hop Albums and number-one on the Top Rap Albums charts, selling 42,000 copies in its first week. According to Hits Daily Double, it has sold 167,000 copies in the US as of August 2015.

== Critical reception ==
Professional ratings
Aggregate scores
Source	Rating
Metacritic	85/100
Review scores
Source	Rating
AllMusic	4/5 stars
HipHopDX	3.5/5
Pitchfork	8/10
RapReviews	8.5/10
Slant	3/5 stars
Sputnikmusic	4/5
Urb	4.5/5 stars

Emeritus was met with generally favorable reviews from music critics. At Metacritic, which assigns a normalized rating out of 100 to reviews from mainstream publications, the album received an average score of 85 based on seven reviews.

Conan Milne of Urb praised the album, saying it "concludes Scarface's tenure as one of the genre's favorite artists actively recording. It's a depressing thought, yet this is an album that stands proudly among an already hugely influential back catalogue". Steve 'Flash' Juon of RapReviews stated: "no one will forget after Emeritus, an album that proves Scarface deserves accolades and titles just as much as we deserve for him not to retire". AllMusic's David Jeffries found "Emeritus is not the usual, very serious good-bye record, but in so many ways, it's a typical Scarface record. It's just better than usual with the rapper sounding liberated by his decision to move on". Ian Cohen of Pitchfork wrote: "and yet, that Emeritus often seems more righteous than cynical or hopeless (the latter two are a bit soft) is a testament to Scarface strengthening his flow in age".

Jon Caramanica of The New York Times wrote: "it is also among his breeziest, with just a touch of nimbleness animating his reliably sleepy growl over surprisingly exuberant production". Jayson Greene of The Village Voice praised the album, saying "Scarface remains trapped in the four-cornered room of his mind, but he seems to have found a measure of peace in solitude, turning out quietly masterful albums like this one, and letting time turn him into a weathered monument".

In his mixed review for Slant Magazine, Jesse Cataldo resumed: "if this is truly the end for Scarface then Emeritus is a backdoor exit, an unassuming, professional album that quietly gets the job done".

== Track listing ==
No.	Title	Writer(s)	Producer(s)	Length
1.	"Intro" (featuring J. Prince)	Brad Jordan; James Smith; Michael Dean	Scarface; Mike Dean	3:58
2.	"High Powered" (featuring Papa Reu)	Jordan; Joseph Johnson	N.O. Joe	3:03
3.	"Forgot About Me" (featuring Lil' Wayne and Bun B)	Jordan; Dwayne Carter; Bernard Freeman; Eddie Montilla; Andre Lyon; Marcello Valenzano	Cool & Dre	3:36
4.	"Can't Get Right" (featuring Bilal)	Jordan; Bilal Oliver; Dominick Lamb	Nottz	4:04
5.	"Still Here" (featuring Shateish)	Jordan; Teresa Marie Cook; Lamb	Nottz	3:53
6.	"It's Not a Game" (featuring Takai "Cookie" Hicks)	Jordan; Ramon Ibanga Jr.	Illmind	3:47
7.	"Who Are They" (featuring K-Rino, Slim Thug and Porsha)	Jordan; Eric Kaiser; Stayve Thomas; Ibanga Jr.	Illmind	3:57
8.	"Soldier Story" (featuring Z-Ro)	Jordan; Joseph McVey; Anthony Gilmour	Tone Capone	4:25
9.	"Redemption Song"	Jordan; Johnson	N.O. Joe	3:15
10.	"High Note"	Jordan; Jacob Dutton	Jake One	3:54
11.	"We Need You" (featuring Wacko)	Jordan; Damon Grison; Johnson	N.O. Joe	3:28
12.	"Unexpected" (featuring Wacko)	Jordan; Grison; Rayshaun Thompson; Michael Clervoix	Young Cee; Sha Money XL	4:11
13.	"Emeritus"	Jordan; Marc Shemer	Scram Jones	3:31
14.	"Outro"	Jordan; Dean	Scarface; Mike Dean	1:12

Sample credits

- Track 3 contains a sample of Billy Paul's "I'm Just a Prisoner" from the 360 Degrees of Billy Paul LP.
- Track 4 contains a sample from Ohio Players' "Good Luck Charm" from the LP Mr. Mean.
- Track 10 contains a sample from Willie Hutch's "Never Let Me Be Without Love" from the LP Midnight Dancer.

== Personnel ==
- Brad "Scarface" Jordan — vocals, producer (tracks: 1, 14)
- James "J. Prince" Smith — vocals (track 1), executive producer
- Reuben "Papa Reu" Nero — vocals (track 2)
- Dwayne "Lil' Wayne" Carter — vocals (track 3)
- Bernard "Bun B" Freeman — vocals (track 3)
- Bilal Oliver — vocals (track 4)
- Teresa "Shateish" Cook — vocals (track 5)
- Takai "Cookie" Hicks — vocals (track 6)
- Eric "K-Rino" Kaiser — vocals (track 7)
- Stayve "Slim Thug" Thomas — vocals (track 7)
- Keryl Jean "Porsha" Watkins — vocals (track 7)
- Joseph "Z-Ro" McVey — vocals (track 8)
- Cory Moore — additional vocals (track 10), engineering
- Damon "Wacko" Grison — vocals (tracks: 11, 12)
- Eddie "Crack Keys" Montilla — strings (track 3)
- Mike Dean — producer (tracks: 1, 14), engineering, mixing, mastering
- Joseph "N.O. Joe" Johnson — producer (tracks: 2, 9, 11)
- Marcello "Cool" Valenzano — producer (track 3)
- Andre "Dre" Lyon — producer (track 3)
- Dominick "Nottz" Lamb — producer (tracks: 4, 5), engineering
- Ramon "!llmind" Ibanga Jr. — producer (tracks: 6, 7)
- Anthony "Tone Capone" Gilmour — producer (track 8)
- Jacob "Jake One" Dutton — producer (track 10)
- Rayshaun "Young Cee" Thompson — producer (track 12)
- Michael "Sha Money XL" Clervoix — producer (track 12)
- Marc "Scram Jones" Shemer — producer (track 13)
- Mike Moore — engineering
- Gina Victoria — engineering
- Darryl Sloan — engineering
- Christian Gugielmo — engineering
- Marc Smilow — engineering
- John Bido — mixing, mastering
- Cey Adams — art direction, design

== Charts ==
=== Weekly charts ===
Chart (2008)	Peak position
US Billboard 200	24
US Top R&B/Hip-Hop Albums (Billboard)	4
US Top Rap Albums (Billboard)	1

=== Year-end charts ===
Chart (2009)	Position
US Top R&B/Hip-Hop Albums (Billboard)	42
