= Now or Never (Tela album) =

Studio album by Tela
- Released: October 6, 1998
- Recorded: 1998
- Studio: House Of Blues (Memphis, TN); Hippie House (Houston, TX)
- Genre: Southern hip hop; gangsta rap; hardcore hip hop
- Length: 1:13:57
- Label: Rap-A-Lot Records
- Producer: J. Prince (exec.); BJB; DJ Jus Borne; Jazze Pha; Neal Jones; Sam Sneed; SMK; Tela

Tela chronology
Piece of Mind (1996)	Now or Never (1998)	The World Ain't Enuff (2000)

Professional ratings
Review scores
Source	Rating
AllMusic	2.5/5 stars
The Source	3/5 stars

Now or Never is the second studio album by American rapper Tela. It was released on October 6, 1998, through Rap-A-Lot Records. Recording sessions took place at House Of Blues in Memphis and at Hippie House in Houston. Production was handled by Tela himself, together with DJ Jus Borne, Jazze Pha, Neal Jones, BJB, SMK and Sam Sneed. It features guest appearances from the Hoodlumz, Big Zach, Do or Die, Jazze Pha, Scarface, Too $hort and Max Julien. The album peaked at number 49 on the Billboard 200 and number 13 on the Top R&B/Hip-Hop Albums.

== Track listing ==
No.	Title	Producer(s)	Length
1.	"Jetzt Oder Nie"	Tela	1:52
2.	"Roll Wit It (Interlude)"	Tela	1:01
3.	"Roll Wit It" (featuring Scarface and the Hoodlumz)	Tela	5:02
4.	"Bring Em Out"	Tela; DJ Jus Borne	4:33
5.	"Take Flight"	Tela	1:33
6.	"B.I.G.P.I.M.P.S.I.S.I." (featuring Too $hort)	Tela	4:47
7.	"Fallin' Soldiers"	Tela; DJ Jus Borne	4:31
8.	"Why U"	Tela	4:01
9.	"Red Neck Pimp (Interlude)"	Tela	1:44
10.	"Table Dance" (featuring Jazze Pha)	Tela	4:26
11.	"Make a Million"	Tela	5:08
12.	"Still a Man"	BJB; Sam Sneed	5:14
13.	"Too Slick (The Movie)"	DJ Jus Borne	5:50
14.	"Right Now"	Jazze Pha	3:47
15.	"Caesar Knight"	Tela; Jazze Pha	5:18
16.	"Touch Em (Interlude)"	Tela	1:07
17.	"Now or Never (They Wanna Kill Me)" (featuring Do Or Die)	Tela; Jazze Pha; Neal Jones	5:13
18.	"Pimpin Round da World (Interlude)" (featuring Max Julien)	Tela	2:40
19.	"These Hoe's" (featuring Big Zach)	SMK	3:48
20.	"Money and the Power" (featuring the Hoodlumz)	Neal Jones	2:22
Total length:			1:13:57

== Personnel ==
- Winston "Tela" Rogers – main artist, producer (tracks: 1–11, 15–18), mixing
- Brad "Scarface" Jordan – featured artist (track 3)
- Barry "O.C." Ware – featured artist (tracks: 3, 20)
- Thomas "Low Key" McCollum – featured artist (tracks: 3, 20)
- Todd "Too $hort" Shaw – featured artist (track 6)
- Phalon "Jazze Pha" Alexander – featured artist (track 10), producer (tracks: 14, 15, 17)
- Do Or Die – featured artists (track 17)
- Max Julien – featured artist (track 18)
- Big Zach – featured artist (track 19)
- Eric Gales - guitar (track 15)
- James "DJ Jus Borne" Blake – producer (tracks: 4, 7, 13)
- Charles "BJ" Byrd – producer (track 12)
- Samuel "Sam Sneed" Anderson – producer (track 12)
- Neal Jones – producer (tracks: 17, 20), engineering, mixing
- Sean "SMK" Pross – producer (track 19)
- Kevin Haywood – engineering, mixing
- Micah Harrison – engineering
- Benny Quinn – mastering
- James "J Prince" Smith – executive producer
- Lisa Browne – artwork
- Ray Blodget – artwork
- Anzel "Red Boy" Jennings – artwork, production coordinator
- Frederick Toma – photography
- Cato Walker – production coordinator
- Tony "Big Chief" Randle – supervisor

== Charts ==
Chart (1998)	Peak position
US Billboard 200	49
US Top R&B/Hip-Hop Albums (Billboard)	13
