= The Walking Dead (1995 film) =

1995 film directed by Preston A. Whitmore II

- Soundtrack album cover
- Directed by: Preston A. Whitmore II
- Written by: Preston A. Whitmore II
- Produced by: George Jackson; Doug McHenry; Frank Price
- Starring: Allen Payne; Eddie Griffin; Joe Morton
- Cinematography: John L. Demps Jr.
- Edited by: Don Brochu; William C. Carruth
- Music by: Gary Chang
- Distributed by: Savoy Pictures
- Release date: February 24, 1995
- Running time: 88 minutes
- Country: United States
- Language: English
- Box office: $6,014,341

The Walking Dead is a 1995 war film written and directed by Preston A. Whitmore II and starring Allen Payne, Joe Morton and Eddie Griffin. The film depicts the lives of five Marines who are all assigned to rescue a group of POW during the Vietnam War in 1972. It opened to poor reviews and low box office receipts. Previews billed it as "the black experience in Vietnam".

The box-office gross was over $6,000,000.00.

== Plot ==
In 1972 North Vietnam, short-timer Marines are dispatched by helicopter to conduct their last mission: to evacuate the survivors from a POW camp abandoned by the Viet Cong. The landing zone - which they expect to be cold - is actually hot (under fire) and after a short fight, only four members of the rescue mission survive. SSgt. John Barkley and Hoover Branche have a brief fight after Hoover wants to radio for an evacuation and Barkley insists they finish the mission. During their fight a mortar lands nearby, knocking them both into a swamp. Barkley saves Branche from drowning. They are joined shortly by Brooks and Evans. The soldiers defer to the ranking Marine, Sgt. Barkley, who insists that they press on to a nearby cathedral. They reach the building and kill several NVA soldiers. At morning, they are planning their next move when they are ambushed by more NVA soldiers including tree snipers. After a firefight they manage to kill the soldiers with the help of Cpl. Pippins, who appears from the brush and also begins attacking them. After subduing Pippins they look for the rest of his platoon and discover them murdered and their radio missing. They decide to tie Pippins up and bring him along as they march toward the POW camp.

The group then recollect about each of their individual reasons for joining the Marines. SSgt. Barkley was a preacher at a church until he came home to his bedroom seeing his wife in bed having sex with another man, Barkley shoots and kills the man and catches the train out of town. Hoover works for a meat packing place until he got fired for stealing meat. Cole tries to rent an apartment, but he is turned down by the real estate agent, because of his race. Brooks tells his girlfriend that he's joining the Marine Corps to be like his grandfather, Pippins was working for Ray until he is killed by gangsters and chased into the military enlistment line without getting caught. While Cole and Barkley go ahead to survey the area, Hoover and Brooks smoke cannabis and talk about Brooks' girlfriend, who just dumped him via the mail. During their break, Pippins escapes and takes Brooks' pistol. The four men regroup and head out without Pippins. When they reach the camp, they discover a deranged Pippins holding a Vietnamese woman hostage. After killing the woman in front of them, Pippins turns on them with a gun and is killed by Sgt. Barkley. After seeing the camp is empty, the men realize they are expendable decoys. They radio in and are informed that the Marines cleared the POW camp four hours earlier, and that they have 20 minutes to reach their pickup point before the entire area is bombed. As the men go to leave bombs begin dropping on them. They escape the bombardment and head through the jungle to the landing zone, but are ambushed by more NVA soldiers. Brooks is killed, and Cole and Barkley wounded. Hoover goes back and rescues Barkley and the three men are evacuated by helicopter. During an epilogue, we are told that Cole became a career Marine who retired after 20 years of service, Sgt. Barkley took a job counseling troubled teens in Georgia, and Hoover went back home, married his girlfriend and opened up his own business.

== Cast ==
- Allen Payne as Cole Evans
- Eddie Griffin as Pvt. Hoover Branche
- Joe Morton as SSgt. John Barkley
- Vonte Sweet as PFC. Joe Brooks
- Roger Floyd as Cpl. Pippins
- Bernie Mac as Ray
- Ion Overman as Shirley Evans
- Kyley Jackman as Sandra Evans
- Jean-Claude La Marre as Pvt. Earl Anderson (as Jean LaMarre)
- Lena Sang as Barbra Jean
- Wendy Raquel Robinson as Celeste
- Dana Point as Edna
- Doil Williams as Harold
- Damon Jones as 2nd Lt. Duffy
- Kevin Jackson as Deuce

== Soundtrack ==
The Walking Dead

Soundtrack album by various artists
- Released: March 7, 1995
- Recorded: 1994–1995
- Genre: Hip hop; R&B
- Length: 41:32
- Label: Motown
- Producer: Marvin Gaye; N.O. Joe; Norman Whitfield; Organized Noize; Rare Earth; Smokey Robinson

Singles from The Walking Dead soundtrack
- 1. "Among the Walking Dead" Released: April 25, 1995

Professional ratings
Review scores
Source	Rating
AllMusic	3/5 stars

The soundtrack album for the film was released on March 7, 1995, via Motown Records. It consists mostly of Motown hits from the 1960s and 1980s but also includes three newly recorded hip-hop songs exclusive to the soundtrack. The soundtrack failed to make it to the Billboard charts but Scarface's "Among the Walking Dead" was a minor hit on the R&B and rap charts.

=== Track listing ===
No.	Title	Writer(s)	Producer(s)	Length
1.	"How I Wish" (performed by Queen Latifah)	Dana Owens; Organized Noize	Organized Noize	4:49
2.	"Smiling Faces Sometimes" (performed by The Undisputed Truth)	Norman Whitfield; Barrett Strong	Norman Whitfield	3:13
3.	"What's Going On" (performed by Marvin Gaye)	Al Cleveland; Marvin Gaye; Renaldo Benson	Marvin Gaye	3:52
4.	"Ooo Baby Baby" (performed by The Miracles)	William Robinson; Warren Moore	Smokey Robinson	2:43
5.	"The Tracks of My Tears" (performed by The Miracles)	Robinson; Moore; Marvin Tarplin	Smokey Robinson	3:01
6.	"Cloud Nine" (performed by The Temptations)	Whitfield; Strong	Norman Whitfield	3:36
7.	"Get Ready" (performed by Rare Earth)	Robinson	Rare Earth	2:47
8.	"I Heard It Through the Grapevine" (performed by Marvin Gaye)	Whitfield; Strong	Norman Whitfield	5:53
9.	"War" (performed by Edwin Starr)	Whitfield; Strong	Norman Whitfield	3:26
10.	"Among the Walking Dead" (performed by Scarface)	Brad Jordan; Joseph Johnson; Harold Armstrong	N.O. Joe	3:39
11.	"Conflict" (performed by Queen Latifah, Whitehead Bros. and Big Rube)	Owens; Kenny Whitehead; Johnny Whitehead; Ruben Bailey; Organized Noize	Organized Noize	4:33
Total length:				41:32
