= The World Ain't Enuff =

Studio album by Tela
- Released: September 19, 2000
- Recorded: 2000
- Studio: House Of Blues (Memphis, TN); Hippie House Studios (Houston, TX); Pacifique Studios (North Hollywood, CA)
- Genre: Southern hip hop
- Length: 53:08
- Label: Rap-A-Lot 2K
- Producer: J. Prince (exec.); DJ Slice Tee; Tela

Tela chronology
Now or Never (1998)	The World Ain't Enuff (2000)	Double Dose (2002)

Professional ratings
Review scores
Source	Rating
AllMusic	3/5 stars
RapReviews	7/10

The World Ain't Enuff is the third studio album by American rapper Tela. It was released on September 19, 2000, through Rap-A-Lot Records. Recording sessions took place at House Of Blues in Memphis, at Hippie House Studios in Houston, and at Pacifique Studios in North Hollywood. Production was handled by Tela himself, along with DJ Slice T. It features guest appearances from AK, Devin the Dude, Gangsta Blac, Jazze Pha, Low Key, Money Marv and Scarface. The album peaked at number 47 on the Billboard 200 and number 8 on the Top R&B/Hip-Hop Albums.

== Track listing ==
No.	Title	Writer(s)	Producer(s)	Length
1.	"Intro"	Winston Rogers	Tela	2:14
2.	"Tela"	Rogers	Tela	3:46
3.	"Can't Stop Me"	Rogers; Stephen Carroll	Tela; Paragon (co.)	3:58
4.	"Throat on a Boat"			1:33
5.	"Bye! Bye! Hater!"	Rogers	Tela	5:09
6.	"Let's Be Friends"	Rogers; Ferrell Miles; Jalil Hutchins; Lawrence Smith	Tela; Ensayne Wayne (co.)	4:45
7.	"Playboy"	Rogers; Sheldon Arrington	Slice T; Tela	4:43
8.	"The Med"			0:47
9.	"Drugs" (featuring Devin the Dude and Gangsta Blac)	Rogers; Devin Copeland; Arrington	Slice T; Tela	4:31
10.	"Sho Nuff 2000"	Rogers; Arrington	Slice T; Tela	4:26
11.	"Table Dance (Millennium Mix)" (featuring Jazze Pha)	Rogers	Tela	4:22
12.	"Hell Naw" (featuring AK and Money Marv)	Rogers; Dennis Round	Tela	4:10
13.	"Set Me Free"	Rogers; Al Green; Al Jackson Jr.; William Mitchell	Tela	4:18
14.	"The World Ain't Enuff" (featuring Low Key and Scarface)	Rogers; Thomas McCollum; Brad Jordan; Arrington	Slice T; Tela	4:26
Total length:				53:08

Sample credits

- Track 6 contains a portion of "Friends" written by Jalil Hutchins and Lawrence Smith
- Track 13 contains a portion of "Look What You Done for Me" written by Al Green, Al Jackson Jr. and Willie Mitchell

== Personnel ==
- Winston "Tela" Rogers – main artist, producer
- Devin "Devin the Dude" Copeland – featured artist (track 9)
- Courtney "Gangsta Blac" Harris – featured artist (track 9)
- Phalon "Jazze Pha" Alexander – featured artist (track 11)
- Dennis "AK47" Round – featured artist (track 12)
- Money Marv – featured artist (track 12)
- Thomas "Low Key" McCollum – featured artist (track 14)
- Brad "Scarface" Jordan – featured artist (track 14)
- Sheldon "Slice T" Arrington – drum programming (track 11), producer (tracks: 7, 9, 10, 14), engineering, mixing
- Stephen "Paragon" Carroll – co-producer (track 3)
- Ferrell "Ensayne Wayne" Miles – co-producer (track 6)
- Jeff Wilbanks – engineering
- Micah Harrison – engineering
- Chris Bellman – mastering
- James "J Prince" Smith – executive producer
- Roque Graphics – artwork, design
- Mario Castellanos – photography
- Anzel "Int'l Red" Jennings – A&R
- Tony "Big Chief" Randle – production supervisor

== Charts ==
Chart (2000)	Peak position
US Billboard 200	47
US Top R&B/Hip-Hop Albums (Billboard)	8
