= Rush Davis =

American songwriter, producer, and DJ

Rush Davis is an American songwriter, producer, and DJ from South Los Angeles.

== Career ==
Davis's journey into underground culture began at age 15, when he became estranged from his family. He found guidance and inspiration through House of Xtravaganza and the event series Mustache Mondays. Davis refined his talents under the mentorship of Doriana Sanchez, a choreographer and creative director known for her work with Cher, Cirque du Soleil, and So You Think You Can Dance.

As a creative director, Davis has worked with artists such as Serpentwithfeet and the R&B duo THEY. His work spans a variety of mediums, including album rollouts, music videos, brand development, and live performance staging. Davis's influence has been felt across platforms such as Afropunk.

As a producer and songwriter, Davis has collaborated with an array of artists, including Shaun Ross, Taraji P. Henson, Kelly Rowland, Afrojack, George Clinton, Duke Dumont, TOKiMONSTA, Kaytranada, SZA, Rochelle Jordan, and Doja Cat. He has released two albums, Transmission and XMSN DS, in partnership with his longtime collaborator, under the YoungArt/FadeToMind label.

In recent years, Davis expanded into event production, launching the seasonal Tuesday event, "Never Forget A Face," in Downtown Los Angeles. Described as "a living altar dedicated to the queer nightlife architects that paved the way," the event serves as a tribute to the cultural pioneers of the queer nightlife scene.

In June 2024, Davis played the Glastonbury Music Festival.

In August 2023, Davis opened for Beyoncé during her sold-out Renaissance World Tour and later performed at the Hollywood Palladium alongside Zhu. He also co-wrote the single "Lover/Friend" for Kaytranada and Rochelle Jordan.

Rush Davis and Kingdom's collaborative album Transmission pays homage to queer nightlife, particularly the Los Angeles-based Mustache Mondays, a crucial space for LGBTQ people of color. Davis reflects on how this inclusive community helped him find his identity. The album is marked by bass-heavy beats and experimental sounds, with tracks like “Love Is Blood” highlighting the “softness of masculinity.” The project also features collaborations with artists such as Rochelle Jordan, Shaun Ross, and Kiddy Smile.

== Discography ==
Song title	Artist(s)	Release date	Notes
Sumthin Crazy	Snakehips, Rochelle Jordan	2023	
Lover/Friend	KAYTRANADA, Rochelle Jordan	2023	
Paranoia Silverlining	Lola Consuelos, JO JO	2022	
UNISEX	Shaun Ross, Amber Mark	2022	
Math & Magic	Rush Davis, Kingdom	2022	
Audacity	Rush Davis, Kingdom	2022	
Pretty Boy Venom	Rush Davis, Kingdom	2022	
The Fall	ZHU	2022	
Red Light Green Light	Duke Dumont, Shaun Ross	2022	For Club Play Only, Pt. 6
WATERBOY	Shaun Ross	2021	
SIMPLE	Shaun Ross	2021	
Transmission	Rush Davis, Kingdom	2021	
YOU CARE	Shaun Ross	2021	
Bad Side	Rush Davis, Kingdom, Gisele Alicea Xtravaganza, Kiddy Smile	2021	
Element	Rush Davis, Kingdom	2021	
Nerve	Rush Davis, Kingdom	2021	
LIVIN	Shaun Ross	2021	
Ching Ching	Wolfgang Gartner	2021	
The Fear	Duke Dumont, Niia	2020	
Evidence	Girl Unit, Rush Davis	2019	
Good Medicine	Wolfgang Gartner, Rush Davis	2018	
Ride	Nikö Blank, Rush Davis	2017	
Chiquita	Tyla Yaweh	2017	
What Is Love	Kingdom, SZA	2017	
Baptize	Dawn Richard	2016	
Paint It Blue	Dawn Richard	2016	
Honest	Dawn Richard	2016	
DREAMZ COME TRUE	JIMMY EDGAR, Rochelle Jordan	2016	
Feel Trip	Rush Davis	2016	
Off & On	Dickystixxx, Rush Davis	2016	
Steer	Scarface, Rush Davis	2015	
