= Silence (Facemob album) =

Studio album by Facemob
- Released: November 19, 2002
- Recorded: 2001–2002
- Studios: Hippie House Studios (Houston, TX); Knockhard Studios (Houston, TX)
- Genre: Hip-hop
- Length: 51:48
- Label: Rap-A-Lot
- Producers: Domo; Mr. Lee; Scarface; Tone Capone

Facemob chronology
The Other Side of the Law (1996)	Silence (2002)

Professional ratings
Review scores
Source	Rating
AllMusic	2/5 stars

Silence is the second and final studio album by American hip-hop group Facemob. It was released on November 19, 2002 through Rap-A-Lot Resurrection. Recording sessions took place at Hippie House Studios and Knockhard Studios in Houston. Production was handled by Mr. Lee, Scarface, Domo and Tone Capone, with J. Prince serving as executive producer. It features guest appearances from Yukmouth, Do Or Die and G Mone. The album debuted at number 84 on the Top R&B/Hip-Hop Albums chart in the United States.

== Track listing ==
No.	Title	Writer(s)	Producer(s)	Length
1.	"Young Gunz"	Harold Armstrong; Leroy Williams	Mr. Lee	2:21
2.	"Lay It Down" (featuring Yukmouth)	Armstrong; Jean Dorcy; Jerold Ellis; Williams	Mr. Lee	4:12
3.	"Pimp City"	Armstrong; Dorcy; Kevin Brown; Williams	Mr. Lee	3:19
4.	"Bubble"	Armstrong; Dorcy; Brown; Williams; Anthony Gilmour	Mr. Lee; Tone Capone	3:38
5.	"No Tomorrow"	Armstrong; Dorcy; Brown; Williams	Mr. Lee	4:53
6.	"Midwest Gunslangers"	Armstrong; Dorcy; Brad Jordan; Williams	Scarface; Mr. Lee	3:09
7.	"All Balls, No Brains"	Armstrong; Williams	Mr. Lee	4:35
8.	"Headhunters" (featuring G-Mone and Yukmouth)	Armstrong; Gary Paul Talley; Ellis; Michael Poye	Domo	4:19
9.	"Gangsta Shit"	Armstrong; Dorcy; Brown; Williams	Mr. Lee	4:48
10.	"Fuck the Police" (featuring Scarface)	Armstrong; Dorcy; Jordan	Scarface; Mr. Lee	4:29
11.	"Rich Man, Poor Man"	Armstrong; Dorcy; Brown; Williams	Mr. Lee	4:16
12.	"Pleasure, Power and Pain" (featuring Do Or Die)	Armstrong; Dorcy; Brown; Anthony Round; Dennis Round; Darnell Smith; Williams	Mr. Lee	4:23
13.	"Mob Business"	Armstrong; Brown; Dante L. Miller; Poye	Domo	3:26
Total length:				51:48

== Charts ==
Chart (2002)	Peak position
US Top R&B/Hip-Hop Albums (Billboard)	84
