= Among the Walking Dead =

Single by Scarface

from the album Music From The Film Soundtrack The Walking Dead
- Released: April 25, 1995
- Recorded: 1994
- Genre: Hip hop
- Length: 3:39
- Label: Motown
- Songwriters: Brad Jordan; Joseph Johnson; D. Jones
- Producer: N.O. Joe

Scarface singles chronology
"Hand of the Dead Body" (1995)	"Among the Walking Dead" (1995)	"Smile" (1997)

"Among the Walking Dead" is a hip hop song by American rapper Scarface. It was released on April 25, 1995 via Motown as a single from The Walking Dead soundtrack. Produced by N.O. Joe, it features an uncredited guest appearance from Facemob.

The song was a minor hit, peaking at number 15 on the Bubbling Under Hot 100, number 91 on the Hot R&B/Hip-Hop Songs and number 14 on the Hot Rap Songs charts in the United States.

== Track listing ==
No.	Title	Length
1.	"Among The Walking Dead" (Radio Edit)
2.	"Among The Walking Dead" (LP Version)
3.	"Among The Walking Dead" (Instrumental)
4.	"Among The Walking Dead" (Acapella)

== Personnel ==
- Brad "Scarface" Jordan – vocals
- Facemob – vocals
- Joseph "N.O. Joe" Johnson – producer
- Darrale Jones – art direction, A&R direction

== Charts ==
Chart (1995)	Peak position
US Bubbling Under Hot 100 (Billboard)	15
US Hot R&B/Hip-Hop Songs (Billboard)	91
US Hot Rap Songs (Billboard)	14
