= Rigormortiz =

Studio album by DMG
- Released: June 1, 1993
- Recorded: 1993
- Genres: Gangsta rap; G-funk; horrorcore; southern hip hop
- Labels: Rap-A-Lot; Priority
- Producers: Mike Dean; N.O. Joe; Scarface; John Bido; James Smith; Big Chief

DMG chronology
Rigormortiz (1993)	Black Roulette (2003)

Professional ratings
Review scores
Source	Rating
AllMusic	link
RapReviews	8/10 2004

Rigormortiz is the debut studio album by rapper DMG. It was released on June 1, 1993 through Rap-a-Lot and Priority Records and featured production from Mike Dean, N.O. Joe and DMG's mentor Scarface. The album made it to 40 on the R&B charts and 22 on the Heatseekers chart. "You Don't Hear Me Doe" was released as a single and had a promotional music video shot for it.

== Guests ==
Many guest appear on the album, the first appearance is made by Bushwick Bill who hooks up with DMG on the "Intro". Cozy-K appears on the track "Prelude to a Murdah". Former Geto Boys member Big Mike assists DMG on the song "Rest In Peace". The last and the most set of collaborations comes with track 15 "Buck Em Down" which is assisted by Geto Boys rapper Scarface and another appearance by Big Mike and south-coast group 5th Ward Boyz and 2 Low and Mr. 3-2 fill the rest in.

== Reception ==
Rapreviews gave Rigormortiz 8/10 and stated that the common element on all the tracks is the deep and hard-hitting bass complemented by sharp snares. The samples used vary, but the end result is a serving of hard gangsta funk for DMG to rap over. Lyrically, DMG fits right in with the hard core gangsta element that has made Rap-A-Lot the label it is. Allmusic rated the album 3/5.

The album stayed in the "R&B/Hip-Hop Albums" for 20 weeks

== Track listing ==
No.	Title	Length
1.	"Intro" (featuring Bushwick Bill)	1:37
2.	"You Don't Hear Me Doe"	4:02
3.	"Prelude to a Murdah" (featuring Cozy-K)	4:11
4.	"One in the Chamba"	3:09
5.	"Pure Dope, No Cut"	3:49
6.	"Kiss Yourself Good Bye Bye"	3:17
7.	"I Ain't Bullshitting"	3:25
8.	"Prison Riot"	2:47
9.	"Pay the Cost"	3:31
10.	"Psycho"	2:54
11.	"I Don't Fuck You"	4:29
12.	"Rest in Peace" (featuring Big Mike)	4:02
13.	"Send Em Smooth"	3:41
14.	"Behind the Wall"	3:28
15.	"Buck Em Down" (featuring Scarface, 5th Ward Boyz, Big Mike, 2 Low and Mr. 3-2)	4:25
16.	"Outro"	0:48
Total length:		53:35

== Personnel ==
- Artwork - Leroy Robinson, JR.
- Engineer - Mike Dean
- Assistant Engineer - Pee Wee
- Executive Producer - Brad Jordan, James Smith, Tony Randle
- Mastering - John Moran, Mike Dean
- Mixing - Mike Dean, N.O. Joe
- Photography - In A Flash Photography
- Producer - Big Chief, James Smith, John Bido, Mike Dean, N.O. Joe, Scarface

== Charts ==
Chart (1993)	Peak position
Billboard Top R&B/Hip-Hop Albums	40
Billboard Top Heatseekers	22
