= Let Me Roll =

1993 single by Scarface

Single by Scarface featuring J. Prince

from the album The World Is Yours
- Released: August 17, 1993
- Genre: Hip hop
- Length: 4:53
- Label: Rap-A-Lot; Priority
- Songwriters: Brad Jordan; James Smith
- Producer: Scarface

Scarface singles chronology
"A Minute to Pray and a Second to Die" (1992)	"Let Me Roll" (1993)	"Now I Feel Ya" (1993)

Music video
- "Let Me Roll" on YouTube

"Let Me Roll" is a song by American rapper Scarface and the lead single from his second studio album The World Is Yours (1993). It features vocals from J. Prince.

== Background ==
In an interview with Complex, Scarface said about the song:

That was my dope smoking song. That's when Swisher Sweets started getting popular in the neighborhood. My buddy, his name was Toast, and he died in 1992 but he was the first guy to smoke Swisher Sweets. He was like 17-years-old and he would cut the Swisher Sweets open and put the weed in it. Now everybody was smoking Philly Blunts and White Owls, but Toast was smoking Sweets. So I wrote that song.

== Composition and critical reception ==
The song is based on and samples heavily from Dukey Stick by George Duke.

The production of the song contains "slaphappy bass, tinkling keyboards and relaxed drums", over which Scarface recounts an afternoon of hanging out in the neighborhood and activities including smoking cannabis cigars, seeing women drive by, drinking 40 oz bottles of St. Ides, and "Jammin' to a tape to my partner had made / 'Growin' up in the Hood' bein mixed with Face". According to Scarface, he was referring to DJ Screw in that line.

Havelock Nelson of Rolling Stone wrote a favorable response to the song, commenting that Scarface "proves more engaging" in his performance.

== Charts ==
Chart (1993)	Peak position
US Billboard Hot 100	87
US Hot R&B/Hip-Hop Songs (Billboard)	50
US Hot Rap Songs (Billboard)	2
