= Tela (rapper) =

American rapper

- Also known as: Winston Rogers, W. Rogers, W.Rogers
- Born: Winston Taylor Rogers III
- Origin: Memphis, Tennessee, U.S.
- Genres: Hip hop; Southern hip hop; gangsta rap
- Occupation: Rapper
- Years active: 1996–present
- Labels: Suave House Records; Rap-A-Lot Records

Winston Rogers III, professionally known by his stage name Tela, is an American rapper from Memphis, Tennessee, best known for the single "Sho Nuff" (1997). Early in his career, he was associated with 8Ball & MJG and signed to Suave House Records to release the album, Piece of Mind. He moved to Rap-A-Lot Records to release more albums.

== Discography ==
=== Studio albums ===
Title	Release	Peak chart positions	
Title	Release	US	US R&B
Piece of Mind	Released: November 5, 1996; Label: Suave House	70	17
Now or Never	Released: October 16, 1998; Label: Rap-A-Lot	49	13
The World Ain't Enuff	Released: September 19, 2000; Label: Rap-A-Lot	47	8
Double Dose	Released: October 8, 2002; Label: Rap-A-Lot	116	18

=== Independent albums ===
- Made in the USA (2007)
- Gators & Suits (2010)

=== Singles ===
==== As lead artist ====
Title	Release	Peak chart positions				Album
Title	Release	US	US R&B	US Air	US Rap	Album
"Sho Nuff" (with Jazze Pha & 8Ball & MJG)	1997	58	32	49	10	Piece of Mind

==== As featured artist ====
Title	Release	Peak chart position on US Air	Album
"Sex Faces" (Scarface featuring Tela, Too $hort & Devin the Dude)	1998	73	My Homies
