= Hand of the Dead Body =

Single by Scarface featuring Ice Cube

from the album The Diary
- Released: 1994
- Genre: Political hip-hop; gangsta rap
- Label: Rap-A-Lot; Noo Trybe
- Songwriters: Brad Jordan; O'Shea Jackson
- Producers: Uncle Eddie; Scarface; Mike Dean; N.O. Joe

Scarface singles chronology
"I Never Seen a Man Cry a.k.a. I Seen a Man Die" (1994)	"Hand of the Dead Body" (1994)	"Among the Walking Dead" (1995)

Ice Cube singles chronology
"Natural Born Killaz" (1994)	"Hand of the Dead Body" (1994)	"The World Is Mine" (1997)

Music video
- "Hand of the Dead Body" on YouTube

"Hand of the Dead Body" is a hip-hop song written and performed by American rappers Scarface and Ice Cube. It was released in late 1994 via Rap-A-Lot Records as the second single from Scarface's third solo studio album The Diary. Produced by Uncle Eddie, Scarface himself, Mike Dean and N.O. Joe, it features an uncredited additional vocals from Devin the Dude on the chorus.

In the United States, the single peaked at number 74 on the Billboard Hot 200, number 39 on the Hot R&B/Hip-Hop Songs, number 57 on the R&B/Hip-Hop Airplay, number nine on the Hot Rap Songs and number 22 on the Dance Singles Sales charts. It also made it to number 41 on the UK singles chart and number 12 on the Official Dance Singles Chart in the United Kingdom.

The song's lyrics is centered on the government, the media and music critics who are quick to attack gangsta rap for violence on the streets. A music video featuring Scarface and Ice Cube rapping in a conference was also released.

== Track listing ==
No.	Title	Length
1.	"People Don't Believe a.k.a. Hand of the Dead Body" (Radio Edit)	3:59
2.	"People Don't Believe a.k.a. Hand of the Dead Body" (Instrumental)	4:47
3.	"People Don't Believe a.k.a. Hand of the Dead Body" (N.O. Radio Remix)	4:54
4.	"People Don't Believe a.k.a. Hand of the Dead Body" (N.O. Remix Instrumental)	4:51
5.	"People Don't Believe a.k.a. Hand of the Dead Body" (M. Dean Radio Remix)	5:16
6.	"People Don't Believe a.k.a. Hand of the Dead Body" (M. Dean Remix Instrumental)	5:08

== Charts ==
Chart (1995)	Peak position
UK Singles (Official Charts)	41
UK Dance (Official Charts)	12
US Billboard Hot 100	74
US Hot R&B/Hip-Hop Songs (Billboard)	39
US R&B/Hip-Hop Airplay (Billboard)	57
US Hot Rap Songs (Billboard)	9
