= Mr. Scarface Is Back =

Studio album by Scarface
- Released: October 8, 1991
- Genre: Gangsta rap
- Length: 45:31
- Labels: Rap-A-Lot; Priority; EMI
- Producers: Crazy C; Scarface

Scarface chronology
Mr. Scarface Is Back (1991)	The World Is Yours (1993)

Singles from Mr. Scarface Is Back
- 1. "Mr. Scarface" Released: 1991; 2. "A Minute to Pray and a Second to Die" Released: 1992

Mr. Scarface Is Back is the debut studio album by the American rapper Scarface. It was released on October 8, 1991, by Rap-A-Lot Records and Priority Records. The album was supported by two singles: "Mr. Scarface" and "A Minute to Pray and a Second to Die". Both attained minor success on the charts.

The album peaked at number 51 on the Billboard 200, on November 9, 1991. On April 23, 1993, the album was certified gold by the Recording Industry Association of America (RIAA).

"Mr. Scarface" is included on Music Inspired by Scarface, a compilation album of Scarface-related tracks.

== Critical reception ==
Professional ratings
Review scores
Source	Rating
AllMusic	4.5/5 stars
Entertainment Weekly	B+
RapReviews	8/10
The Rolling Stone Album Guide	4/5 stars
The Source	4/5 stars

Trouser Press noted that "Mr. Scarface Is Back substitutes humor for horror, and sprinkles liberal amounts of blowhard self-aggrandizement." Robert Christgau praised the track "I'm Dead". In 2009, the Houston Press placed the album at No. 6 on its list of the 25 best Houston rap albums.

== Track listing ==
No.	Title	Length
1.	"Mr. Scarface"	5:52
2.	"The Pimp"	3:08
3.	"Born Killer"	3:38
4.	"Murder by Reason of Insanity"	3:47
5.	"Your Ass Got Took"	3:44
6.	"Diary of a Madman"	3:04
7.	"Body Snatchers"	3:12
8.	"Money and the Power"	3:49
9.	"P D Roll 'Em"	3:47
10.	"Good Girl Gone Bad"	4:17
11.	"A Minute to Pray and a Second to Die"	4:44
12.	"I'm Dead"	2:27
Total length:		45:29

Notes

- The tracks "The Pimp" and "Your Ass Got Took" were omitted from the clean version of the album.

== Charts ==
=== Weekly charts ===
Chart (1991)	Peak position
US Billboard 200	51
US Top R&B/Hip-Hop Albums (Billboard)	13
US Heatseekers Albums (Billboard)	1

=== Year-end charts ===
Chart (1992)	Position
US Top R&B/Hip-Hop Albums (Billboard)	47

== Certifications ==
Region	Certification	Certified units/sales
United States (RIAA)	Gold	500,000^{^}
^{^} Shipments figures based on certification alone.
