= A Minute to Pray and a Second to Die =

Single by Scarface

from the album Mr. Scarface Is Back
- B-side: "I'm Dead"
- Released: February 28, 1992
- Recorded: 1991
- Genre: Gangsta rap
- Length: 4:44
- Label: Rap-A-Lot; Priority
- Songwriters: Brad Jordan; Thomas Anderson
- Producers: Crazy C; Scarface

Scarface singles chronology
"Mr. Scarface" (1991)	"A Minute to Pray and a Second to Die" (1992)	"Let Me Roll" (1993)

"A Minute to Pray and a Second to Die" is the second single released from Scarface's debut album, Mr. Scarface Is Back. Released on February 28, 1992, and produced by Crazy C and Scarface himself, "A Minute to Pray and a Second to Die" made it to two Billboard charts, peaking at No. 69 on the Hot R&B Singles chart and No. 13 on the Hot Rap Singles chart. The song features a sample of Marvin Gaye's "Inner City Blues". A music video for the song was released shortly after, which mirrors Scarface's storytelling descriptions mostly scene after scene.

== Track listing ==
=== A-side ===
1. "A Minute to Pray and a Second to Die" (Radio)- 4:44
2. "A Minute to Pray and a Second to Die" (Urban Radio)- 4:45
3. "A Minute to Pray and a Second to Die" (Instrumental)- 4:44

=== B-side ===
1. "A Minute to Pray and a Second to Die" (Club mix)- 4:45
2. "I'm Dead" (Radio)- 2:06
3. "I'm Dead" (Club mix)- 4:51
