= I Seen a Man Die =

Single by Scarface

from the album The Diary
- B-side: "G's"
- Released: 1994
- Genre: Hip-hop
- Length: 4:32
- Label: Rap-A-Lot; Noo Trybe
- Songwriters: Brad Jordan; Joseph Johnson
- Producers: N.O. Joe; Scarface; Mike Dean

Scarface singles chronology
"Now I Feel Ya" (1993)	"I Seen a Man Die" (1994)	"Hand of the Dead Body" (1995)

Music video
- "I Seen a Man Die" on YouTube

"I Seen a Man Die", also known as "I Never Seen a Man Cry", is the first single released from Scarface's third album, The Diary.

Produced by N.O. Joe, Mike Dean and Scarface himself, "I Seen a Man Die" became a top 40 hit on the Billboard Hot 100, the first of two that Scarface had in his career. It peaked at 37 on the Billboard Hot 100.

The song is a tale of a young male released from prison after seven years looking for a better life only to get caught up on the crime side again and robbed by his enemies. He dies in the hospital, regretful of his life decisions. The song also has a music video released that mirrors Scarface's lyrics.

In June 2026, CBS News included the song in its list of the 250 essential American songs of the past 250 years.

== Track listing ==
=== A-Side ===
1. "I Never Seen a Man Cry" (Radio Version)- 4:30
2. "I Never Seen a Man Cry" (Instrumental)- 4:30

=== B-Side ===
1. "G's" (LP Version)- 4:47
2. "G's" (Instrumental)- 4:47

== Charts ==
=== Weekly charts ===
Chart (1994)	Peak position
US Billboard Hot 100	37
US Hot R&B/Hip-Hop Songs (Billboard)	15
US Hot Rap Songs (Billboard)	2

=== Year-end charts ===
Chart (1995)	Position
US Hot R&B/Hip-Hop Songs (Billboard)	74
