= Now I Feel Ya =

1993 single by Scarface

Single by Scarface

from the album The World Is Yours
- Released: 1993
- Genre: Hip hop
- Length: 7:32
- Label: Rap-A-Lot; Priority
- Songwriter: Brad Jordan
- Producers: James Smith; John Bido

Scarface singles chronology
"Let Me Roll" (1993)	"Now I Feel Ya" (1993)	"I Seen a Man Die" (1994)

Music video
- "Now I Feel Ya" on YouTube

"Now I Feel Ya" is a song by American rapper Scarface and the second single from his second studio album The World Is Yours (1993). It was produced by James Smith and John Bido.

== Content ==
Lyrically, "Now I Feel Ya" is an introspective song in which Scarface expresses his love of and gratitude to his mother, stepfather, grandmother and young son. In addition, he raps about having to change his lifestyle to be a good influence as a parent.

== Charts ==
Chart (1993)	Peak position
US Hot R&B/Hip-Hop Songs (Billboard)	79
US Hot Rap Songs (Billboard)	19
