= Papa Reu =

American rapper

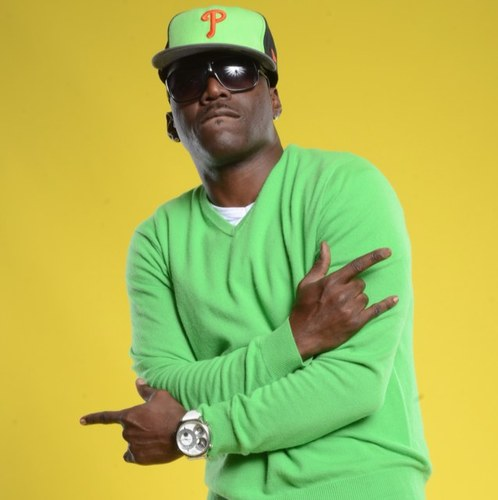

Background information
- Born: Reuben Nero; October 17, 1974 (age 51); Trinidad and Tobago
- Origin: Houston, Texas, US
- Genres: Hip hop, Southern hip hop, reggae, dancehall
- Occupations: Rapper, singer, songwriter, performer, producer
- Years active: 1994–present
- Labels: Cash Money Records; Reu Muzik
- Website: papareu.com

Reuben Nero, better known by his stage name Papa Reu, (born October 17, 1974) is a Trinidad and Tobago-born rapper, singer, producer, and songwriter from Houston, Texas., United States. He is also a former member of hip-hop record label Cash Money Records. He has established his own record label Reu Muzik, Inc. through which he has released three albums, namely Xcuse Me, U Know Me, and Certified.

== Biography ==
=== Music career ===
At the age of 16, Reu and his brother relocated to Houston, Texas, where he began affiliating himself within the local hip-hop scene and became a pioneer of Houston's popular underground rap movement.

With his island sound, southern street savvy, and a respect of music history, 8Ball & MJG caught his act. The duo enlisted Reu for an appearance on their 1994 album On the Outside Looking In. A few independent singles hit the streets during the late 1990s, along with appearances on albums by Mr. Coop and Field Mob, but it wasn't until 2000 that Papa Reu broke out on his own with the full-length Xcuse Me! on his own Reu Muzik, then released U Know Me a year later, and while the album sold well regionally, it was his 2002 appearance on the 504 Boyz's hit single "Tight Whips" that would make him a Southern rap player.

Much of his early success came with Cash Money Records being featured on early multi-platinum recordings, such as the Big Tymers' "Lick Them Up Shots", Juvenile's "Rich Ni**az" and Lil Wayne's "Not Like Me". He was featured in H-Town track "Buss One", Solange Knowles in "Don't Fight the Feeling" in the original soundtrack of The Fighting Temptations and in 504 Boyz' track "Tight Whips" also featuring Slay Sean, 5th Ward Weebie, Lil' Romeo and Little D. Other featured recordings include tracks with Changin' Lanes, Z-Ro Tolerance and Miss Mykie

Papa Reu has collaborated with a number of artists like YZ & Gemini in "Hold on" (2007), Billy Cook in "Bubble Eye" (2008), Lil Keke in "Diamond and Pearls" (2008) and Rick Ross in "Put It in the Air" (2010).

== Discography ==
=== Albums ===
- 2000: Xcuse Me
- 2001: U Know Me
- 2003: Certified

=== Mixtapes ===
- 2013: Reu'D Boy

=== Singles ===
- 2010: "Put It in the Air" (feat. Rick Ross)
- 2010: "Bumble Bee (What The Buzz About)"
