= DMG (rapper) =

American rapper

- Born: Harold Armstrong; October 22, 1969 (age 56)
- Origin: Saint Paul, Minnesota, U.S.
- Genres: Hip-hop
- Occupation: Rapper
- Years active: 1993–present
- Label: Rap-A-Lot

Harold Armstrong (born October 22, 1969), better known as DMG (short for DetriMental Ganxta), is an American rapper formally signed to Rap-A-Lot Records.

== Career ==
DMG got his break when he met Scarface after a concert. Scarface got DMG a record deal with Rap-a-Lot, where he released his debut album in 1993 entitled Rigormortiz. The album reached Billboard's R&B and Heatseekers charts. Two years later, DMG was invited to join Facemob, a rap group featuring rappers from different regions. Facemob's debut album, The Other Side of the Law was released in 1996 and peaked at 51 on the Billboard 200. After the Facemob, DMG continued making guest appearances on Rap-a-Lot albums throughout the late 90s and early 2000s. DMG returned to Rap-A-Lot in 2002, participating on Facemob's second album, Silence. The following year DMG released his second album, Black Roulette.

== Discography ==
=== Studio albums ===
| Title | Release | Peak chart positions | |
| Title | Release | US R&B | US Heat |
|---|---|---|---|
| Rigormortiz | Released: June 1, 1993; Label: Rap-A-Lot | 40 | 22 |
| Black Roulette | Released: January 28, 2003; Label: Rap-A-Lot | – | – |

=== Collaboration albums ===
| Title | Release | Peak chart positions | |
| Title | Release | US | US R&B |
|---|---|---|---|
| The Other Side of the Law with Facemob | Released: August 13, 1996; Label: Rap-A-Lot | 51 | 6 |
| Silence with Facemob | Released: November 19, 2002; Label: Rap-A-Lot | – | 84 |
