= 8Ball & MJG discography =

- Studio albums: 8
- Compilation albums: 5
- Singles: 10
- Mixtapes: 1
- Guest appearances: 35

The discography of 8Ball & MJG, an American hip hop duo, consists of eight studio albums, one mixtape and ten singles.

== Albums ==
=== Studio albums ===
List of albums, with selected chart positions
Title	Album details	Peak chart positions		Certifications
Title	Album details	US	US R&B	Certifications
Comin' Out Hard	Released: August 17, 1993; Label: Suave House; Format: CD, cassette, digital download, LP	–	40	
On the Outside Looking In	Released: September 27, 1994; Label: Suave House / Relativity; Format: CD, cassette, digital download, LP	106	11	
On Top of the World	Released: October 31, 1995; Label: Suave House / Relativity; Format: CD, cassette, digital download, LP	8	2	RIAA: Gold
In Our Lifetime	Released: May 18, 1999; Label: Suave House / Universal; Format: CD, cassette, digital download, LP	10	1	RIAA: Gold
Space Age 4 Eva	Released: November 21, 2000; Label: Interscope; Format: CD, cassette, digital download	39	9	
Living Legends	Released: May 11, 2004; Label: Bad Boy South / Universal; Format: CD, cassette, digital download	3	1	RIAA: Gold
Ridin' High	Released: March 13, 2007; Label: Bad Boy South / Atlantic; Format: CD, digital download	8	4	
Ten Toes Down	Released: May 4, 2010; Label: Grand Hustle; Format: CD, digital download	36	6	

=== Compilation albums ===
List of compilation albums, with selected chart positions
Title	Album details	Peak chart positions
Title	Album details	US R&B
The Album of the Year (with Suave House Records)	Released: July 29, 1997; Label: Suave House; Formats: CD, digital download	—
Lyrics of a Pimp	Released: December 23, 1997; Label: Omni Records; Formats: CD, digital download	—
Memphis Under World	Released: February 22, 2000; Label: OTS; Formats: CD, digital download	46
Off da Chain, Vol. 1 (with Suave House Records)	Released: June 20, 2000; Label: Suave House; Formats: CD, digital download	—
We Are the South: Greatest Hits	Released: May 18, 2008; Label: Koch Records; Formats: CD, digital download	59
"—" denotes a recording that did not chart.

=== Live albums ===
List of mixtapes, with year released
Title	Album details
Classic Pimpin	Released: January 2, 2019; Label: Push Management; Format: digital download

=== Mixtapes ===
List of mixtapes, with year released
Title	Album details
The Legends Series, Vol. 2	Released: June 21, 2006; Label: self-released; Format: digital download

=== 8Ball albums ===
List of studio albums, with selected chart positions
Title	Album details	Peak chart positions	
Title	Album details	US	US R&B
Lost	Released: May 19, 1998; Label: Draper Inc. Records; Formats: CD, digital download	5	3
Almost Famous	Released: November 20, 2001; Label: JCOR Entertainment; Formats: CD, digital download	47	6
Lay It Down	Released: August 13, 2002; Label: Suave House; Formats: CD, digital download	—	—
Light Up the Bomb	Released: October 10, 2006; Label: 8 Ways Entertainment; Formats: CD, digital download	—	41
The Vet & The Rookie (with Devius)	Released: October 9, 2007; Label: 8 Ways Entertainment; Formats: CD, digital download	—	31
Doin' It Big (with E.D.I.)	Released: April 1, 2008; Label: Real Talk Entertainment, Koch Records; Formats: CD, digital download	—	30
8Ball & Memphis All-Stars: Cars, Clubs & Strip Clubs	Released: February 24, 2009; Label: 8 Ways Entertainment; Formats: CD, digital download	—	—
Life's Quest	Released: July 24, 2012; Label: E1 Music; Formats: CD, digital download	116	14
"—" denotes a recording that did not chart.

=== 8Ball mixtapes ===
List of mixtapes, with year released
Title	Album details
Premro	Released: March 3, 2012; Label: self-released; Format: digital download
Premro 2	Released: January 25, 2013; Label: self-released; Format: digital download

=== MJG albums ===
List of studio albums, with selected chart positions
Title	Album details	Peak chart positions
Title	Album details	US
No More Glory	Released: November 18, 1997; Label: Suave House; Formats: CD, digital download	20
Pimp Tight	Released: April 29, 2008; Label: Real Talk Entertainment; Formats: CD, digital download	—
This Might Be the Day	Released: July 15, 2008; Label: 404 Music Group; Formats: CD, digital download	—
Too Pimpin'	Released: October 11, 2013; Label: Space Age Entertainment, Born Star Entertainment; Formats: CD, digital download	—
Too Pimpin' 2.0	Released: May 27, 2014; Label: MJG Muzik; Formats: CD, digital download	—
"—" denotes a recording that did not chart.

=== MJG mixtapes ===
List of mixtapes, with year released
Title	Album details
Bitches Money Guns	Released: December 14, 2012; Label: self-released; Format: digital download

== Singles ==
List of singles, with selected chart positions showing year released and album name
Title	Year	Peak chart positions		Album
Title	Year	US R&B	US Rap	Album
"Listen to the Lyrics"	1991	—	—	Non-album single
"Players Night Out"	1994	—	—	On the Outside Looking In
"Break'em Off"	1995	—	—	On the Outside Looking In
"Space Age Pimpin'" (featuring Nina Creque)	1995	58	22	On the Outside Looking In
"Pimp Hard"	2000	76	—	Space Age 4 Eva
"You Don't Want Drama" (featuring P. Diddy)	2004	30	22	Living Legends
"Forever" (featuring Lloyd)	2004	—	—	Living Legends
"Ridin High" (featuring Diddy)	2006	—	—	Ridin High
"Clap On" (featuring Yung Joc)	2007	98	—	Ridin High
"Bring It Back" (featuring Young Dro)	2010	45	23	Ten Toes Down
"Blunts & Broads"	2010	—	—	From the Bottom 2 the Top
"—" denotes a recording that did not chart.

== Guest appearances ==
=== 8Ball & MJG ===
List of single and non-single guest appearances, with other performing artists, showing year released and album name
Title	Year	Other artist(s)	Album
"F*ck Dem N*ggas"	1995	—N/a	Down South Hustlers: Bouncin' and Swingin'
"Soul Food (Crazyhouse Remix)"	1995	Goodie Mob	Non-album single
"Sho Nuff"	1996	Tela	Piece of Mind
"Stop Lying"	1996	Mr. Mike	Wicked Wayz
"Hit the Highway "	1996	Mr. 3-2, Too Short	The Wicked Buddah Baby
"Illicit Activity"	1996	The Almighty RSO	Doomsday: Forever RSO
"F*ck Strugglin'"	1997	5th Ward Boyz	Usual Suspects
"In My Nature"	1997	Luniz	Lunitik Muzik
"The Player Way"	1997	Mase	Harlem World
"Who in the FUck?!"	1998	MC Ren	Ruthless for Life
"How Angry"	1998	Jayo Felony	Watcha Gonna Do?
"Ride (Down South)"	1999	Foxy Brown, Juvenile, Too Short	Chyna Doll
"Pimpz, Thugz, Hustlaz & Gangstaz"	1999	Krayzie Bone, Layzie Bone	Thug Mentality 1999
"Don't Stop Rappin'"	1999	Too Short	Can't Stay Away
"Sesshead Funk Junky"	1999	MC Breed	2 for the Show
"Ballin' Gs"		—N/a	Baller Blockin' (soundtrack)
"Lookin' for da Chewin'"	2000	DJ Squeeky & The Family	During the Mission
"Dirty Down South"	2000	Project Playaz, Tom Skeemask	Til We Die
"Middle of the Night" (unreleased)	2000	Twista	Adrenaline Rush 2000
"Gold Grill"	2001	UGK	Dirty Money
"25"	2001	Tela, Jazze Pha	25 (Single), Double Dose
"Can't Stop Pimpin'"	2001	Lil' Jon & the East Side Boyz, Oobie	Put Yo Hood Up
"Roll with Me"	2001	P. Diddy & The Bad Boy Family, Faith Evans	The Saga Continues...
"'Bout That Money"	2002	Criminal Manne	Playtime's Over
"Bezzle"	2003	T.I., Bun B	Trap Muzik
"Hard Times"	2003	Ludacris, Carl Thomas	Chicken-n-Beer
"Put That Thing Down"	2003	DJ Kay Slay, Jagged Edge	The Streetsweeper, Vol. 1
"White Meat"	2004	Lil' Jon	Crunk Juice
"Stay Fly"	2005	Three 6 Mafia, Young Buck	Most Known Unknown
"Gangster Walk"	2005	David Banner, Three 6 Mafia, Marcus	Certified
"Spit Your Game (Remix)"	2005	The Notorious B.I.G., Twista, Krayzie Bone	Spit Your Game (Single)
"Bobby & Whitney"	2006	Pimp C	Pimpalation
"Candy Coated"	2006	Shawnna	Block Music
"Gorilla Pimpin'"	2006	Killer Mike	I Pledge Allegiance to the Grind
"187"	2007	DJ Drama, Project Pat, B.G.	Gangsta Grillz: The Album
"Say It to My Face"	2007	Young Buck, Bun B	Buck the World
"Bluff City Classic"	2007	Kia Shine	Due Season
"City Boy"	2007	J. Holiday	Back of My Lac'
"You're Everything"	2008	Bun B, Rick Ross, David Banner	II Trill
"First 48"	2008	Three 6 Mafia, Project Pat, DJ Spanish Fly, Al Kapone	Last 2 Walk
"Super Clean, Super Hard"	2008	Killer Mike	I Pledge Allegiance to the Grind II
"Used to Be"	2009	UGK, B-Legit, E-40	UGK 4 Life
"Only Know Hard"	2009	Big Scoob, Krizz Kaliko	Monsterifik
"Without Me"	2009	Young Buck	Only God Can Judge Me
"Round Me"	2009	Drumma Boy, Young Buck	Welcome II My City
"Thugged Out"	2009	J-Money	My Life Check Me Out
"Lovin' the Game"	2010	Tela, Jazze Pha	Gators & Suits
"Lay It Down (Remix)"	2011	Lloyd	—N/a
"Money on the Floor"	2012	Big K.R.I.T., 2 Chainz	Live from the Underground
"Re-Up"	2012	Young Buck	Strictly 4 Traps n Trunks 44: Free Young Buck Edition
"While I'm Rollin Up"	2012	Young Dolph	Blue Magic
"Dolla Signs"	2012	Beanie Sigel	Welcome to My City 2
"Hustlin'"	2012	Mr. 704	Gotta Stack Before You Ball
"Smokin On That Loud"	2012	Drumma Boy	—N/a
"The Slab Memoirs"	2013	TMack	Vintage Vol. 1: The Slab Memoirs
"Yean High"	2013	Da Mafia 6ix	6iX Commandments
"Pimpery"	2013	Wais P	Pv$$y Rich
"Pimp Talk"	2013	Boston George, Marcus Manchild	—N/a
"They Wanna Be Like Me"	2014	The Bar-Kays	Take Me To The River: Music From The Motion Picture
"Bitch Get Down"	2015	Pimp C, Bun B	Long Live the Pimp
"Bricks (Remix)"	2015	Gucci Mane, OJ Da Juiceman, Fabolous, Shawty Lo	Kitchen Talk
"Midnight Hoes (Remix)"	2015	Kingpin Skinny Pimp	—N/a
"60 Seconds"	2017	Jabo	—N/a
"It's on the Flo"	2017	Cheeto Gambine	—N/a
"Space Age Grindin'"	2018	Stacey Lois	—N/a
"Grow Up"	2018	Bun B	Return of the Trill
"Destiny"	2019	Lil' Flip	La Clover Nostra: Clover Gang

=== 8Ball ===
List of single and non-single guest appearances, with other performing artists, showing year released and album name
Title	Year	Other artist(s)	Album
"Unsolved Mysteries"	1995	South Circle	Anotha Day Anotha Balla
"Story Goes"	1995	Crime Boss	All in the Game
Anytime (Suave House Remix)"	1998	Brian McKnight	Non-album single
"Jazzy Hoes"	1998	Jermaine Dupri, Too Short, Mr. Black, YoungBloodZ	Life in 1472
"Mama Always Told Me"	1998	Silkk the Shocker, C-Murder, Master P	Charge It 2 da Game
"Where Ya From"	1999	Mobb Deep	Murda Muzik
"Pimp da 1 U Luv"	1999	Charlie Baltimore, Rodney Ellis	Cold as Ice
"Tenn Points"	1999	Cool Breeze	East Point's Greatest Hit
"On Point"	1999	Heavy D, Big Pun	Heavy
"Heavy Weights'	1999	Fat Joe, Big Pun	Violator: The Album
"Southside (Remix)"	1999	Lil' Keke	It Was All a Dream
"Ya Blind"	2000	E-40, Jazze Pha	Loyalty and Betrayal
"Sundown"	2000	Parental Advisory	My Life, Your Entertainment
"What You Ride for?"	2001	Jadakiss, Yung Wun, Fiend	Kiss tha Game Goodbye
"Callin' My Name"	2001	Lil' Keke, Liz	Platinum in da Ghetto
"Everythang's Everythang"	2001	R.W.O.	Book of Game: Chapter 1
"Take a Look Around (Remix)"	2001	Limp Bizkit, E-40	New Old Songs
"Rep Yo City"	2002	E-40, Petey Pablo, Bun B, Lil' Jon & the East Side Boyz	Grit & Grind
"Hustlas, Pimps and Thugs"	2002	Birdman, Jazze Pha, TQ	Birdman
"We Came to Get Dat Cheese"	2002	Baby D, Thorough	Lil' Chopper Toy
"Drop"	2002	Tow Down	Chicken Fried Steak
"TV's (23's and Wang)"	2002	Kingpin Skinny Pimp, Yo Gotti	Pimpin' and Hustlin'
"TV's (24's and Wang)"	2002	Kingpin Skinny Pimp, Yo Gotti, Jack Frost, Nakia Shine	Still Pimpin' and Hustlin'
"Get Your Weight Up"	2003	Lil' Jon & the East Side Boyz, T.I.	Part II
"All Over Your Body"	2003	Big Gipp	Mutant Mindframe
"Hands in the Air"	2003	—N/a	2 Fast 2 Furious (soundtrack)
"Air Force Ones (Remix)"	2003	Nelly, David Banner	Da Derrty Versions: The Reinvention
"Pimp On"	2004	Twista, Too Short	Kamikaze
"Tha Funk"	2004	Devin the Dude	To tha X-Treme
"Boys to Men"	2004	Pastor Troy, Chip	By Any Means Necessary
"Iceman"	2006	Lloyd Banks, Scarface, Young Buck	Rotten Apple
"She Say She Loves Me"	2006	E-40, Bun B	My Ghetto Report Card
"Gangsta Party"	2006	Yo Gotti, Bun B	Back 2 da Basics
"So High"	2006	Trick Daddy, Trey Songz	Back by Thug Demand
"Loose Booty"	2006	Juvenile, Skip	Reality Check
"Turn Off The Lights"	2006	Scoundrels	4-Ever Gullie
"Where They @"	2006	Da Volunteers	Whats Yo Favorite Color
"Top Back"	2007	Young Bleed	Once Upon a Time in Amedica
"Takeoff (Remix)"	2008	Fabo	Kandy Man
"Betta Tell Em"	2010	Young Buck	Back on My Buck Shit Vol. 2: Change of Plans
"Iced Out"	2010	Chingy	Success & Failure
"Still Ridin'"	2010	EDIDON, Kastro, Young Noble, T-Mo	The Stash Spot
"Can't Get My Feet On The Ground"	2010	Kia Shine	The Chronic 2010
"Pie"	2011	Rittz	White Jesus
"Grills Are Gold"	2011	OJ Da Juiceman, Project Pat, Trae tha Truth	Cook Muzik
"Hustla"	2011	Drumma Boy, East Side Jody	The Birth Of D-Boy Fresh
"I'm Ready to Smoke Now"	2012	Tha Dogg Pound, Hustle Boyz	DPGC'ology
"Dont Make No Sense"	2012	Gucci Mane, Fabolous	I'm Up
"Worldwide (OG Remix)"	2013	EDIDON, Makaveli, Pimp C, Lloyd	O.G. Est. 1992
"Clash Of The Titans"	2013	DJ Paul, Drumma Boy	Clash Of The Titans
"Cheffin Skills"	2013	DJ Paul, Drumma Boy	Clash Of The Titans
"If I Say So"	2013	Blood Raw, Juvenile	This That Southern Smoke! 6
"Surround Sound"	2013	Attitude	This That Southern Smoke! 10
"Killa"	2013	Adrian Marcel, Richie Rich	7 Days Of Weak
"By Myself"	2014	Lil' Keke, Kevin Gates	Money Don't Sleep
"Move To Mars"	2014	Pastor Troy	Welcome To The Rap Game
"Hell Yeah"	2014	CB Smooth, Fred the Godson, Project Pat	Country Boy Smooth
"Juste Humain"	2014	Mac Sucrey, Moni	—N/a
"Grippin' Grain"	2015	DJ Scream, Scotty ATL, Big K.R.I.T.	Street Runnaz 92
"I Needs Mine"	2015	Scotty ATL, Devin the Dude	The Cooligan
"I Feel Good"	2016	CB Smooth, Jazze Pha	All I Do

=== MJG ===
List of single and non-single guest appearances, with other performing artists, showing year released and album name
Title	Year	Other artist(s)	Album
"The Click"	1995	Crime Boss	All in the Game
"Whatcha Gonna Do"	1998	112	Room 112
"Watcha Weigh Me"	1999	A+	Hempstead High
"Chocolate Philly"	2000	Spice 1	The Last Dance
"Cowgirl"	2001	Lil' Keke, Cl'che	Platinum in da Ghetto
"Diamonds"	2002	Lil Jon & the East Side Boyz, Bun B	Kings of Crunk
"I'm 'n Luv (Wit a Stripper) 2 - Tha Remix"	2005	T-Pain, Twista, Pimp C, Paul Wall, R. Kelly, Too Short	Rappa Ternt Sanga
"I-85"	2006	Scoundrels	4-Ever Gullie
"What's Yo Favorite Color?"	2006	Da Volunteers	Whats Yo Favorite Color
"Who Got Dat Work"	2006	Da Volunteers	Whats Yo Favorite Color
"Can't U Tell"	2007	Lil' Flip, Squad Up	I Need Mine
"U Know What It Is"	2010	Young Buck, 2 Chainz	Back on My Buck Shit Vol. 2: Change of Plans
"Int'l Player"	2011	Drumma Boy, Bun B	The Birth Of D-Boy Fresh
"If I Die Today"	2013	King Chip, Scarface	44108
"Stripper Pole"	2013	TMack, Goliath	Vintage Vol. 1: The Slab Memoirs
"By Myself"	2013	TMack, Young Buck	Vintage Vol. 1: The Slab Memoirs
"Come On Let's Go"	2014	Lil Wyte, Frayser Boy	B.A.R. (Bay Area Representatives)
"What Up"	2014	Daz Dillinger, Trae tha Truth	Weed Money
"Do You Got a Man?"	2014	Pastor Troy	Welcome to the Rap Game
"Liquor N Drugs"	2014	Da Mafia 6ix	Hear Sum Evil
"Elvis Presley Blvd (Remix)"	2014	Rick Ross, Yo Gotti, Project Pat, Juicy J, Young Dolph	—N/a
"Here We Go Again"	2015	Turk	Get Money Stay Real 2
"Mercy"	2015	Cap 1	FTO University - The Enrollment
"Propane"	2016	Rittz, Devin The Dude	Top of the Line
