= We Are the South: Greatest Hits =

Greatest hits album by 8Ball & MJG
- Released: May 18, 2008
- Genre: Hip-hop
- Length: 1:17:12
- Label: Koch

8Ball & MJG chronology
Ridin High (2007)	We Are the South: Greatest Hits (2008)	Ten Toes Down (2010)

Professional ratings
Review scores
Source	Rating
AllMusic	4/5 stars
Pitchfork	5.4/10
PopMatters	8/10
RapReviews	8/10

We Are The South: Greatest Hits is the greatest hits album by American hip-hop duo 8Ball & MJG. It was released on May 18, 2008 via Koch Records. Executively produced by Tony Draper, it features guest appearances from Cee-Lo, Outkast and Tela. The compilation debuted at number 59 on the Top R&B/Hip-Hop Albums chart in the United States.

== Track listing ==
No.	Title	Length
1.	"Introduction N the Game"	2:55
2.	"Pimp In My Own Rhyme"	4:43
3.	"Don't Flex"	5:04
4.	"Paid Dues" (featuring Cee-Lo)	5:00
5.	"Friend or Foe"	6:27
6.	"Space Age Pimpin'"	5:19
7.	"Sho'nuff" (featuring Tela)	4:46
8.	"Just Like Candy"	4:21
9.	"In the Middle of the Night"	5:14
10.	"What Can I Do"	5:17
11.	"Throw Your Hands Up" (featuring Outkast)	5:24
12.	"Starships and Rockets"	4:15
13.	"The Artists Pay the Price"	5:33
14.	"Have U Been OK"	3:50
15.	"That Girl"	4:47
16.	"Lay It Down"	4:17
Total length:		1:17:12

Notes

- Tracks 2, 5, 6 and 10 previously appeared on On Top of the World (1995).
- Tracks 3, 4 and 11 previously appeared on In Our Lifetime (1999).
- Track 7 previously appeared on Piece of Mind (1996).
- Tracks 8 and 12 previously appeared on The Album of the Year (1997).
- Tracks 9 and 15 previously appeared on No More Glory (1997).
- Track 13 previously appeared on Lost (1998).
- Track 16 previously appeared on Lay It Down (2002).

== Charts ==
Chart (2008)	Peak position
US Top R&B/Hip-Hop Albums (Billboard)	59
