= Pen & Pixel =

American graphic design company

Pen & Pixel Graphics, Inc.
- Type: Private
- Industry: Graphic design
- Founded: 1992; 34 years ago in Houston, Texas, United States
- Founders: Aaron Brauch; Shawn Brauch
- Defunct: 2003
- Fate: Dissolved
- Headquarters: Houston, Texas, United States
- Services: Computer graphics and design
- Website: penandpixel.com

Pen & Pixel Graphics, Inc. was an American graphic design firm based in Houston, Texas that specialized in musical album covers, especially for gangsta rap artists in the Southern United States. For a long time, it was the house design firm for No Limit Records, Cash Money Records, and Suave House Records.

== History ==
The company was started in 1992 by brothers Aaron and Shawn Brauch. The Brauch brothers and their staff worked with over 8,000 clients and completed 19,180 album covers before the company closed its doors in 2003. The brothers cited peer-to-peer file sharing website Napster and the September 11 attacks as reasons for the close; artists were reluctant to fly to Houston to view artwork that listeners would be unlikely to see.

The album covers Pen & Pixel produced have been described as "gaudy", "more-is-more", and "outrageous". Common themes included bullets, cars, drugs, fire, gems, money, women, and other examples of wealth and riches. Pen & Pixel would fulfill client requests for custom album covers, with sketches of the album cover being drawn based on the concepts requested. These sketches would then be scanned by a computer, which would generate a list of items needed for the cover, such as cars and diamonds. Photos would then be taken of these items from different angles, so the same item could be reused in the future. Pen & Pixel apparently refused to produce political covers (with two exceptions being Da Good da Bad & da Ugly by Geto Boys and I'm Goin' Out Lika Soldier by Willie D), and they once rejected a concept by Insane Clown Posse involving a pregnant woman being shot.

In 2020, Pen & Pixel came out of retirement to design the cover art for 21 Savage and Metro Boomin's Savage Mode II. The artwork is in their signature design, heavily inspired by those of Cash Money and No Limit and is a nod to the bling-rap album covers of the 1990s.

== Timeline of notable covers ==
=== 1992 ===
- I'm Goin' Out Lika Soldier by Willie D

=== 1993 ===
- Comin' Out Hard by Eightball & MJG

=== 1994 ===
- Ocean of Funk by E.S.G.
- On the Outside Looking In by Eightball & MJG

=== 1995 ===
- Hillwood by SPM
- Mystic Stylez by Three 6 Mafia
- Sailin' Da South by E.S.G.
- On Top of the World by Eightball & MJG

=== 1996 ===
- The Shocker by Silkk the Shocker
- 3 'n the Mornin' (Part Two) by DJ Screw
- Chapter 1: The End by Three 6 Mafia

=== 1997 ===
- Tru 2 da Game by TRU
- Stackin Chips by 3X Krazy
- I'm Bout It by various artists
- Solja Rags by Juvenile
- Ghetto D by Master P
- Get It How U Live! by the Hot Boys
- Chapter 2: World Domination by Three 6 Mafia
- Unpredictable by Mystikal
- No More Glory by MJG
- Lyrics of a Pimp by Eightball & MJG
- How You Luv That by Big Tymer$

=== 1998 ===
- Make 'Em Say Uhh! by Master P (single)
- Charge It 2 da Game by Silkk the Shocker
- Hustle Town by SPM
- Life or Death by C-Murder
- Give It 2 'Em Raw by Soulja Slim
- Lost by Eightball
- MP da Last Don by Master P
- Shell Shocked by Mac
- Da Game Is to Be Sold, Not to Be Told by Snoop Dogg
- Angel Dust by Indo G
- Sky's the Limit by Magic
- How You Luv That Vol. 2 by Big Tymer$
- Mean Green by various artists
- Ghetto Organized by the Gambino Family
- 400 Degreez by Juvenile
- Da Good da Bad & da Ugly by the Geto Boys
- Ghetto Fabulous by Mystikal
- Power Moves: The Table by SPM

=== 1999 ===
- Made Man by Silkk the Shocker
- CrazyNDaLazDayz by Tear da Club Up Thugs
- Da Next Level by Mr. Serv-On
- Bossalinie by C-Murder
- Shinin' n' Grindin' by E.S.G.
- Chopper City in the Ghetto by B.G. (Note: According to Pen & Pixel, this is the first cover they made to feature the bling-bling style of text that they would become famous for. The album's lead single, "Bling Bling", also served to popularize the term bling-bling.)
- First Come, First Served by Dr. Dooom
- Rear End by Mercedes
- Bigger & Blacker by Chris Rock
- Da Crime Family by TRU
- Guerrilla Warfare by the Hot Boys
- Thuggin' by Magic
- Ghetty Green by Project Pat
- World War III by Mac
- Only God Can Judge Me by Master P
- Tha Block Is Hot by Lil Wayne
- The 3rd Wish: To Rock the World by SPM
- Tha G-Code by Juvenile

=== 2000 ===
- City Under Siege by E.S.G.
- I Got That Work by Big Tymers
- When the Smoke Clears: Sixty 6, Sixty 1 by Three 6 Mafia
- The Leprechaun by Lil' Flip
- Matthew by Kool Keith
- Trapped in Crime by C-Murder
- Baller Blockin' by various artists
- Let's Get Ready by Mystikal
- Space Age 4 Eva by Eightball & MJG
- Ghetto Postage by Master P
- Time Is Money by SPM
- Lights Out by Lil Wayne

=== 2001 ===
- Mista Don't Play: Everythangs Workin by Project Pat
- My World, My Way by Silkk the Shocker
- Project English by Juvenile
- Choices: The Album by Three 6 Mafia
- C-P-3.com by C-Murder
- Bang or Ball by Mack 10
- Never Change: The Pain and Glory Album by SPM
- Tarantula by Mystikal

=== 2002 ===
- Tru Dawgs by C-Murder
- 500 Degreez by Lil Wayne
- Layin' da Smack Down by Project Pat

=== 2003 ===
- White Eyes by Magic
- Let 'Em Burn by the Hot Boys
- Da Unbreakables by Three 6 Mafia
- Terrorist Threats by Westside Connection

=== 2020 ===
- Savage Mode II by 21 Savage
