= Crime Boss (rapper) =

American rapper

- Born: Thurston Slaughter; Houston, Texas, U.S.
- Genre: Hip hop
- Occupations: Rapper, producer, songwriter
- Years active: 1987–present
- Labels: Suave House, Crime Lab Entertainment

Thurston Slaughter, better known by his stage name Crime Boss, is an American rapper. He debuted on 8Ball & MJG's album On the Outside Looking In in 1994. He signed with Suave House Records and issued his first album the following year: All in the Game. The album peaked at no. 113 on the Billboard 200. He followed up in 1997 with his most successful album, Conflicts & Confusion, released by Relativity Records, which went to no. 25 on the Billboard 200. Crime Boss left Suave House and released his third and final album, Still at Large in 1998 for his own Crime Lab Records. After Still at Large, Crime Boss appeared on Spice 1's 2000 album, The Last Dance and Sean T's 2001 album, Can I Shine?. After a brief hiatus, Crime Boss reappeared in 2020 on the music streaming site Spotify with his single "Chemical Imbalance 2.0" featuring Kritical Distrezz.

In 2021 Crime Boss appeared on the single titled "Whippin Potz" which featured Kritical Distrezz and Evil Pimp. In 2026 Crime Boss signed long to collaborator Kritical Distrezz to His Imprint Crime Lab Entertainment and Released Kritical Distrezz's album Distorted Illusions 2.

== Discography ==
=== Studio albums ===
Title	Release	Peak chart positions	
Title	Release	US	US R&B
All in the Game	1995	113	11
Conflicts & Confusion	1997	25	6
Still at Large	1998	—	81
Bossed Up Thangz	2025	-	-

=== Singles ===
Title	Release
"In Danger"	Released: April 16, 2020; Label: Crime Lab Ent / Gut Grind Records; Featured Artist: Kritical Distrezz
"Chemical Imbalance 2.0"	Released: April 21, 2020; Label: Crime Lab Ent / Gut Grind Records; Featured Artist: Kritical Distrezz
"Stash House"	Released: April 21, 2020; Label: Crime Lab Ent / Gut Grind Records; Featured Artist: Kritical Distrezz
"Enemies"	Released: February 15, 2021; Label: Crime Lab Ent / Gut Grind Records; Featured Artist: Kritical Distrezz
"Spirit Fly"	Released: February 18, 2021; Label: Crime Lab Ent / Gut Grind Records; Featured Artist: Kritical Distrezz / Evil Pimp
"Whippin Potz"	Released: October 10, 2021; Label: Crime Lab Ent / Gut Grind Records; Featured Artist: Kritical Distrezz / Evil Pimp
"What's Beef ?"	Released: October 31, 2022; Label: Crime Lab Ent / Gut Grind Records; Featured Artist: Kritical Distrezz
"Grab It"	Released: January 3, 2024; Label: Crime Lab Ent / Gut Grind Records; Featured Artist: Kritical Distrezz
"Bossed Up Thangz"	Released: January 5, 2024; Label: Crime Lab Ent / Gut Grind Records; Featured Artist: Kritical Distrezz
"South Thang"	Released: January 27, 2024; Label: Crime Lab Ent / Gut Grind Records; Featured Artist: Kritical Distrezz

=== Guest appearances ===
Title	Release	Other artist(s)	Album
"Lay It Down"	1994	Eightball & MJG, Thorough	On the Outside Looking In
"Strange"	1996	Tela, Mr. Mike	Piece of Mind
"Ghetto Soldier"	2000	Spice 1, Sean T	The Last Dance
"In Yo Look"	2000	Sean T, Spice 1	Heated
