= Conflicts & Confusion =

Studio album by Crime Boss
- Released: April 8, 1997
- Recorded: 1996–1997
- Genre: Gangsta rap, G-funk, Southern hip hop
- Length: 42:59
- Label: Suave House
- Producer: T-Mix, E-A-Ski, CMT

Crime Boss chronology
All in the Game (1995)	Conflicts & Confusion (1997)	Still at Large (1998)

Conflicts & Confusion is the second album by the American rapper Crime Boss, released in 1997. It was his most successful album, peaking at no. 25 on the Billboard 200. The album was produced by T-Mix and the duo of E-A-Ski and CMT.

"Please Stop" was released as a single.

== Critical reception ==
Professional ratings
Review scores
Source	Rating
AllMusic	2.5/5 stars
Houston Chronicle	2.5/4 stars
Orange County Register	2/5 stars

The Orange County Register wrote: "The production by Oakland's E-A-Ski is the album's high point. Most of the beats are creative, unique and not hyped-up '70s samples." The Houston Chronicle thought that "while Conflicts & Confusion's tales of the urban war zone break no new ground, Crime Boss' lyrical skills and the solid production lifts the overall product."

== Track listing ==
1. "Intro"- 2:04
2. "Conflicts and Confusion"- 2:44
3. "No Friends"- 3:13
4. "Chemical Imbalance"- 3:36 ft 8ball
5. "Warning"- 3:50 ft MJG
6. "Back to the Streets"- 4:11
7. "Life Is Crying"- 5:02 ft NOLA
8. "What Does It Mean to Be a Real Crime Boss"- 3:07
9. "Close Range"- 3:17
10. "Please Stop"- 2:55
11. "Get Up in Your Ass"- :42
12. "Death Notes"- 4:23 ft Fedz
13. "Get Mine"- 3:56 – ft. Thorough of SCircle, OC of the Fedz

== Charts ==
Chart (1997)	Peak position
Billboard 200	25
Billboard Top R&B/Hip-Hop Albums	7
