= South Circle =

American hip hop group

- Origin: Houston, Texas, United States
- Genres: Hip-Hop
- Years active: 1993–1997
- Label: Suave House / Relativity
- Members: Mr. Mike; Thorough

South Circle was an American hip hop group composed of Houston rappers Mr. Mike (Mike Walls) and Thorough (Rex Robeson) that was signed to Suave House Records in the mid-90s.

The duo's only album, Anotha Day Anotha Balla was released on July 4, 1995. The album had two singles released, "New Day" and "Attitudes" and peaked at 63 on the Billboard 200. South Circle disbanded in 1997 after making an appearance on the 1997 Suave House compilation, The Album of the Year.

Prior to the group disbanding, Mr. Mike embarked on a solo career. His debut album, Wicked Wayz was released while the group was still together and broke into the top 40 on the Billboard 200, peaking at 29. After the group disbanded Mr. Mike continued releasing studio albums, while Thorough made guest appearances on other albums through 2003 before virtually disappearing from the music industry. Mr. Mike's son, Trill JHill, entered the music industry in 2019 with his first single "Famous Dexter".

== Discography ==
=== Studio albums ===
Title	Release	Peak chart positions	
Title	Release	US	US R&B
Anotha Day Anotha Balla	Released: July 4, 1995; Label: Suave House	63	8

=== Singles ===
- "Attitudes" (1995)
- "New Day" (1995)

=== Guest appearances ===
==== South Circle ====
Title	Release	Other artist(s)	Album
"Point of No Return"	1995	Crime Boss	All in the Game
"All in My Mind"	1995	Eightball & MJG	On Top of the World
"Geto Madness"	1997		The Album of the Year

==== Thorough ====
Title	Release	Other artist(s)	Album
"Lay It Down"	1994	Eightball & MJG, Crime Boss	On the Outside Looking In
"Get Mine"	1997	Crime Boss, OC	Conflicts & Confusion
"Questions"	1997		The Album of the Year
"Class in Session"	1998		Lost
"Get It Crunk"	1999	Eightball & MJG	In Our Lifetime
"Pimp Shit"	2000	Eightball & MJG	Space Age 4 Eva
"Something 2 Say"	2001	Cl'che	8 Ball Presents The Slab

== Videography ==
=== Music videos ===
Title	Release	Album
"Attitudes"	1995	Anotha Day Anotha Balla
"New Day"	1995	Anotha Day Anotha Balla
