= Have Guitar Will Travel (Bo Diddley album) =

Studio album by Bo Diddley
- Released: January 1960
- Recorded: July 14, 1955 – September 1959 in Chicago, Illinois
- Length: 32:03
- Label: Checker
- Producers: Leonard Chess, Phil Chess, Bo Diddley

Bo Diddley chronology
Go Bo Diddley (1959)	Have Guitar Will Travel (1960)	Bo Diddley in the Spotlight (1960)

Singles from Have Guitar Will Travel
- 1. "Cops & Robbers" Released: November 1956; 2. "Say Man, Back Again" Released: November 1959

Professional ratings
Review scores
Source	Rating
AllMusic	4/5 stars
Album of the Year	80/100

Have Guitar Will Travel is the third studio album by rock and roll musician Bo Diddley. It was released on the Checker Records label in 1960.

The front cover of Diddley's album displays a white calling card similar to that which Richard Boone's Have Gun – Will Travel character Paladin carried and gave out on every episode of the series. The location was Livingston Street, Brooklyn, New York City.

== Background ==
The album is also documented as having been released in the United States in January 1960, with Leonard Chess, Phil Chess, and Bo Diddley serving as producers. The recording sessions took place in Chicago, Illinois, between July 1955 and September 1959.

The album's title was inspired by the American television Western series Have Gun – Will Travel. Its cover art features a design reminiscent of the calling card used by the show's protagonist, Paladin. The album is also regarded as the starting point of the humorous cover-art style seen on Bo Diddley's early albums.

Musically, the album draws on early rhythm and blues, rock and roll, electric blues, and Chicago blues, showcasing Diddley's distinctive powerful guitar playing and rhythms. AllMusic critic Bruce Eder noted that the album featured a sound as raw and intense as Diddley's first two albums, while his guitar playing was more clearly defined and his vocal delivery displayed a greater range of expression. He also highlighted tracks such as "Cops and Robbers", "Run Diddley Daddy", and "I Need You Baby".

Among the album's tracks, "Cops and Robbers" was written by Kent Harris and had previously been released as a single in 1956. "Say Man, Back Again" was released as a single in 1959, while the remaining tracks made their debut on the album. An edited version of "She's Alright", excluding the vocal overdubbing, was also included as the B-side of the "Say Man, Back Again" single.

The album's songs subsequently influenced several British bands. In particular, "Cops and Robbers" was recorded by The Rolling Stones and various other British groups, while "I Need You Baby" was also covered by the Rolling Stones and The Liverbirds. AllMusic described the album's songs as an important source of reference for British bands during the British Invasion, introducing them to American rock and roll music.

== Cover versions ==
Several songs on Have Guitar Will Travel were covered by many British Invasion bands. Originally recorded and released in 1956 by Boogaloo and his Gallant Crew led by singer Kent Harris (reissued on the Road Songs collection by Frémeaux et Associés), "Cops and Robbers" was recorded by The Rolling Stones, The Masters Apprentices, Wayne Fontana & the Mindbenders, Downliners Sect, and George Thorogood.

== Track listing ==
All tracks are written by Ellas McDaniel, except where noted.

Side one
No.	Title	Writer(s)	Length
1.	"She's Alright"		3:56
2.	"Cops and Robbers"	Kent Harris	3:21
3.	"Run Diddley Daddy"		2:36
4.	"Mumblin' Guitar"		2:49
5.	"I Need You Baby"		2:18
Total length:			15:00

Side two
No.	Title	Length
1.	"Say Man, Back Again"	2:53
2.	"Nursery Rhyme"	2:43
3.	"I Love You So"	2:20
4.	"Spanish Guitar"	3:58
5.	"Dancing Girl"	2:17
6.	"Come On Baby"	2:52
Total length:		17:03

== Personnel ==
Per liner notes

- Bo Diddley – vocals, guitar
- Jerome Green – co-lead vocals on "Say Man, Back Again", maracas, background vocals
- Peggy Jones – guitar, background vocals
- Willie Dixon – bass
- Clifton James – drums
- Frank Kirkland – drums
- Jody Williams – guitar
- Lafayette Leake – piano
- Lester Davenport – harmonica on "Spanish Guitar"

== Charts ==
"Say Man, Back Again" reached #23 on the R&B Singles chart.

== Release history ==
Region	Date	Label	Format	Catalog
United States	January 1960	Checker Records	LP	LP-2974
United States	1984	Chess Records	LP	CH-9187
United States	1984	Chess Records	Cassette	CHC-9187
