= Ten Toes Down =

Studio album by 8Ball & MJG
- Released: May 4, 2010
- Recorded: 2009–2010
- Studio: Echo Studios (Atlanta, GA)
- Genre: Hip-hop
- Length: 1:03:56
- Label: Grand Hustle; E1
- Producer: 1500 or Nothin'; B-Don; Beat Billionaire; David Banner; Drumma Boy; Lil' C; Midnight Black; Mo B. Dick; Nard & B; Nitti; Swizzo

8Ball & MJG chronology
Ridin High (2007)	Ten Toes Down (2010)

Singles from Ten Toes Down
- 1. "Ten Toes Down" Released: February 2, 2010; 2. "Bring It Back" Released: February 2, 2010

Ten Toes Down is the eighth studio album by the American Southern hip-hop duo 8Ball & MJG. It was released on May 4, 2010, via Grand Hustle Records and E1 Music.

Production was handled by Drumma Boy, Nard & B, 1500 or Nothin', B-Don, Beat Billionaire, David Banner, Lil' C, Midnight Black, Mo B. Dick, Nitti and Swizzo. It features guest appearances from Bun B, Lil' Boosie, Slim Thug, Soulja Boy, T.I., Young Dro, Mitchelle'l and Ricco Barrino.

The album debuted at number 36 on the Billboard 200, number 10 on the Top R&B/Hip-Hop Albums, number 5 on the Top Rap Albums, and number 6 on the Independent Albums, selling 16,000 units in its first week in the United States.

== Background ==
The Memphis hip-hop duo 8Ball and MJG released their seventh collaborative studio album and the second for Bad Boy South, Ridin High, on March 13, 2007, before leaving the label and each member once again embarking on their own solo runs. In the period from 2007 to 2008, 8Ball released 2 albums — The Vet & the Rookie together with Devius and Doin' It Big together with E.D.I. Mean. And MJG released Pimp Tight and This Might Be the Day — both in 2008 with a small time difference between the release dates.

In 2009, it was revealed that the duo has signed with T.I.'s Grand Hustle Records label.

In late January 2010, 8Ball and MJG announced that they will be releasing their latest album entitled Ten Toes Down spring of this year through a new deal between Grand Hustle and independent distribution company E1 (formerly Koch Records). Along with this announcement, the rappers revealed that the album will be produced by Drumma Boy, Nard & B, Nitti and Mo B. Dick, and will feature guest appearances from T.I., Young Dro, Snoop Dogg, David Banner and Bun B.

On February 2, 2010, the duo released two singles off of the album, "Ten Toes Down" and "Bring It Back". An accompanying music video for "Bring It Back", directed by Gabriel Hart, was released on March 28, 2010.

Originally scheduled for April 6, the release was postponed and the album was released on May 4, 2010. Despite the aforementioned announcement, Snoop Dogg's contributions did not make the final cut.

== Critical reception ==
Professional ratings
Review scores
Source	Rating
AllMusic	3.5/5 stars
HipHopDX	3/5
RapReviews	8/10
Slant	4/5 stars

Steve 'Flash' Juon of RapReviews praised the album, summing up: "it's clear from one enjoyable album after another that these two enjoy the rap, enjoy the hustle, and enjoy reaping the rewards of their hard work again and again". M.T. Richards of Slant found the album "plays like an auditory parade of hip-hop monarchy". AllMusic's David Jeffries resumed: "worthy nostalgia numbers and two more Drumma Boy cuts finish the set off, leaving the listener with a very good and very familiar effort that satisfies after a bit of trimming". Mitchell Hannah of HipHopDX wrote: "lacking evolution by continually conceding to major labels’ cookie-cutter templates, Ten Toes Down comes as a disappointment, especially for those from the B.C. era. Nevertheless, the album retains nostalgia value and places Ball & G among a select number of 20-year veterans that are able to stay remotely close to relevant".

== Track listing ==
No.	Title	Writer(s)	Producer(s)	Length
1.	"It's Going Down"	Premro Smith; Marlon J. Goodwin; Christopher Gholson	Drumma Boy	4:54
2.	"Bring It Back" (featuring Young Dro)	Smith; Goodwin; D'Juan Hart; Chadron S. Moore	Nitti	3:56
3.	"I Don't Give a Fuck" (featuring Bun B)	Bernard James Freeman	David Banner	4:36
4.	"Ten Toes Down" (featuring Lil' Boosie)	Smith; Goodwin; Torence Hatch; Gholson	Drumma Boy	4:44
5.	"Fuck U Mean" (featuring Soulja Boy)		B-Don	4:21
6.	"We Come From"	Smith; Goodwin; Lavell Crump; Tracey Sewell	Midnight Black	4:43
7.	"She's So Fine"	Randy Banks	Swizzo	4:21
8.	"Grinding" (featuring Ricco Barrino)		Nard & B	4:17
9.	"Spotlight" (featuring Ricco Barrino)		Beat Billionaire	3:33
10.	"Right Now" (featuring Mitchelle'l)	Raymond Emile Poole	Mo B. Dick	6:29
11.	"What They Do" (featuring T.I.)		1500 or Nothin'; Lil' C	4:42
12.	"Billy "Truth Be Told"" (featuring Mitchelle'l)		Nard & B	3:24
13.	"Life Goes On" (featuring Slim Thug)	Smith; Goodwin; Stayve Thomas; Gholson	Drumma Boy	5:21
14.	"Still Will Remain"	Smith; Goodwin; Gholson	Drumma Boy	4:35
Total length:				1:03:56

== Charts ==
Chart (2010)	Peak position
US Billboard 200	36
US Top R&B/Hip-Hop Albums (Billboard)	10
US Top Rap Albums (Billboard)	5
US Independent Albums (Billboard)	6
