= Go Bo Diddley =

Studio album by Bo Diddley
- Released: July 1959
- Recorded: Chicago, March 2, 1955 & September 1958
- Length: 30:57
- Label: Checker
- Producers: Leonard Chess; Phil Chess; Bo Diddley

Bo Diddley chronology
Bo Diddley (1958)	Go Bo Diddley (1959)	Have Guitar Will Travel (1960)

Singles from Go Bo Diddley
- 1. "I'm Sorry" Released: February 1959; 2. "Crackin' Up" Released: May 1959; 3. "Say Man" Released: August 1959

Go Bo Diddley is the second album by American rock and roll musician Bo Diddley, released in July 1959. The album was Bo's first studio album that included some material that had not been prereleased on singles, and his first LP for Checker Records. In 2003, Rolling Stone ranked it number 214 on its The 500 Greatest Albums of All Time, and 216 in a 2012 revised list.

== Background ==
The B-side to the single "Hush Your Mouth", "Dearest Darling" was released June 1958 and also released on Bo Diddley's self-titled debut album. Bo's next single "Willie and Lillie" was released in November 1958 and then released on this album. Bo's next single "I'm Sorry"/"Oh Yea" was released in February 1959 and reached number 17 on Billboard magazine's Hot R&B Sides chart. The next single "Crackin' Up" b/w "The Great Grandfather" was released in May. Go Bo Diddley was released two months later in July. In November 1959, Bo released his most popular single "Say Man"/"The Clock Strikes Twelve" which became a crossover hit reaching number 20 on the Billboard Hot 100.

Four songs on the album were album-only tracks, including "You Don't Love Me (You Don't Care)", "Don't Let It Go," "Little Girl," and "Bo's Guitar."

== Recording ==
The original recordings in mono format were recorded with an Ampex-350 tape recorder. The songs "You Don't Love Me (You Don't Care)" and "Little Girl" were from Bo's first session for Chess Records on March 2, 1955.

== Track listing ==
All songs were written by Ellas McDaniel, with "I'm Sorry" made in collaboration with Alan Freed and Harvey Fuqua.

Side one

1. "Crackin' Up" – 2:41
2. "I'm Sorry" – 2:30
3. "Bo's Guitar" – 2:38
4. "Willie and Lillie" – 2:34
5. "You Don't Love Me (You Don't Care)" – 2:36
6. "Say Man" – 3:09

Side two

1. "The Great Grandfather" – 2:40
2. "Oh Yea" – 2:30
3. "Don't Let It Go" – 2:36
4. "Little Girl" – 2:35
5. "Dearest Darling" – 2:32
6. "The Clock Strikes Twelve" – 2:35

== Personnel ==
Per liner notes

- Bo Diddley – vocals, guitar; violin on "The Clock Strikes Twelve"
- Peggy Jones – guitar, backing vocals
- Jerome Green – co-lead vocals on "Say Man", maracas
- Willie Dixon – bass
- Clifton James – drums
- Frank Kirkland – drums
- Billy Boy Arnold – harmonica on "You Don't Love Me (You Don't Care)" and "Little Girl"
- Lafayette Leake – piano
- Otis Spann – piano

== Release history ==
Region	Date	Label	Format	Catalog
United States	July 1959	Checker Records	LP	LP-1436
United Kingdom	1959	London Records	LP	HA-M 2230
United States	August 27, 1966	Checker Records	Stereo-Pak	21-382A
United States	1967	Checker Records	LP	LP-3006
United States	1984	Chess Records	LP	CH-9196
