= SOTY =

SOTY may refer to:

- Sok Soty, Cambodian politician
- Skater of the Year, an award given by Thrasher magazine
- Song of the Year (disambiguation), a name of several awards honoring the best song of the past year
- Story of the Year, an American rock band
- Student of the Year, a 2012 Indian film by Karan Johar
  - Student of the Year 2, a 2019 Indian film, sequel of the 2012 film
