= Almost Famous (disambiguation) =

Almost Famous is a 2000 American film.

Almost Famous may also refer to:

- Almost Famous (soundtrack), the soundtrack album to the film
- Almost Famous (musical), a 2019 musical based on the film
- Almost Famous (8Ball album), 2001
- Almost Famous (Living Legends album), 2001
- Almost Famous (Lumidee album), 2003
- Almost Famous: The Sexy Lady EP, a 2007 EP by Yung Berg
- "Almost Famous", a song from rapper Eminem's album Recovery
- "Almost Famous", a song from rapper G-Eazy's album These Things Happen
- Almost Famous, a comedy special performed by Canadian comedian Russell Peters in 2016
