= Rise to Power =

Rise to Power may refer to:

- Rise to Power (Kane & Abel album), 1999
- Rise to Power (Monstrosity album), 2003
- Rise to Power (Rick Ross album), 2007
- Rise to Power (Battlecross album), 2015
- Star Wars: Rise to Power, an unreleased mobile game
