= Favorite Song =

Favorite Song may refer to:

- "Favorite Song" (Colbie Caillat song), 2011 song featuring Common
- "Favorite Song" (Chance the Rapper song), 2013 song featuring Childish Gambino
- "Favorite Song" (Toosii song), 2023 song
- Favorite Song (TV series), Vietnamese music show
- Title equivalent to Song of the Year, currently or formerly used by:
  - Nickelodeon Kids' Choice Awards
  - Myx Music Award for Song of the Year, name from 2006 though 2017
  - People's Choice Awards, name for overall award from 2015 though 2017; also by genre
  - American Music Awards, by genre such as "Favorite Song – Pop/Rock"
  - MTV Pilipinas for Favorite Song
  - Vijay Award for Favourite Song

== See also ==
- Favorite Songs of All, 1998 greatest hits album by Phillips, Craig and Dean
- Favorite son, political term
- Favorite (disambiguation)
