= Still at Large =

Studio album by Crime Boss
- Released: August 11, 1998
- Recorded: 1997–1998
- Studio: J2 Fresh Studio (Houston, TX); Uptown Recording Studio (Houston, TX)
- Genre: Gangsta rap
- Length: 1:05:26
- Label: Crime Lab

Crime Boss chronology
Conflicts & Confusion (1997)	Still at Large (1998)	Young Bo$$e$ Getting Ca$h (2006)

Professional ratings
Review scores
Source	Rating
AllMusic	3/5 stars
RapReviews	6/10

Still at Large is the third studio album by American rapper Crime Boss. It was released in August 1998 through Crime Lab Records/Regi Music. It features guest appearances from 2 Low, E.S.G., Pimp Money, Big Dave, T-Dubb and 1 Way. The album debuted at number 81 on the Top R&B/Hip-Hop Albums chart in the United States.

Following the release of his successful second album, Conflicts & Confusion, Crime Boss left Suave House Records and formed his own independent label called Crime Lab Records and released Still at Large through it. Though his previous two albums were produced by Suave House's T-Mix, Crime Boss himself handled a majority of the album's production.

== Track listing ==
No.	Title	Length
1.	"Down Low Intro"	2:08
2.	"Imagination"	4:50
3.	"Unsolved Mysteries"	4:35
4.	"Who Is This"	5:36
5.	"See What Ya! Don't See"	4:36
6.	"Young Saggin"	5:27
7.	"OSC"	5:18
8.	"Danger Zone"	3:25
9.	"Listen 2 Me"	4:31
10.	"M.V.P."	5:56
11.	"Big Man"	5:01
12.	"Done Up"	4:06
13.	"Who Ya Fucking With"	6:51
14.	"Outro: For My Saggin"	4:06
Total length:		1:05:26

== Charts ==
Chart (1998)	Peak position
US Top R&B/Hip-Hop Albums (Billboard)	81
