= The Album of the Year =

Compilation album by various artists
- Released: July 29, 1997
- Recorded: 1995−97
- Studio: Urban House Studios, Inc (Atlanta, GA)
- Genre: Southern hip hop; gangsta rap
- Length: 44:33
- Label: Suave House; Relativity
- Producer: Tony Draper (exec.); DJ Slice Tee; Smoke One Productions

Suave House Records compilation albums chronology
The Album of the Year (1997)	Off da Chain Volume 1 2000 (2000)

Professional ratings
Review scores
Source	Rating
AllMusic	3/5 stars

The Album of the Year is a compilation album presented by American hip hop record label Suave House Records. It was released on July 29, 1997 through Suave House/Relativity Records. Composed of eleven songs, the album featured ten exclusive tracks performed by Suave House artists The Fedz, 8Ball & MJG, NOLA, Tela, Nina Creque, Thorough and Randy, with the exception of South Circle's "Geto Madness", which appeared on their 1995 album Anotha Day Anotha Balla. Production was handled by Smoke One Productions and DJ Slice T, with Tony Draper serving as executive producer. The album peaked at number 26 on the Billboard 200 and number 4 on the Top R&B Albums.

== Track listing ==
No.	Title	Producer(s)	Length
1.	"Intro"	Smoke One Productions	1:39
2.	"Rider" (performed by Tela)	Slice T	4:28
3.	"Heat of the Night" (performed by The Fedz)	Smoke One Productions	4:07
4.	"Trapped" (performed by Nola)	Smoke One Productions	4:08
5.	"Just Like Candy" (performed by 8Ball & MJG)	Smoke One Productions	4:45
6.	"Questions" (performed by Thorough)	Smoke One Productions	4:35
7.	"Starships and Rockets" (performed by 8Ball & Randy)	Smoke One Productions	4:16
8.	"Life Is Crying" (performed by Nola & Nina Creque)	Smoke One Productions	4:14
9.	"Geto Madness" (performed by South Circle)	Smoke One Productions	4:02
10.	"Death Notes" (performed by The Fedz)	Smoke One Productions	4:24
11.	"Dusk Till Dawn" (performed by The Fedz)	Smoke One Productions	3:51
Total length:			44:33

Sample credits

- Track 5 contains samples from "Candy" written by Larry Blackmon and Thomas Jenkins

== Personnel ==
- Roger Tausz – engineering, mixing
- Tristan "T-Mix" Jones – mixing
- John Moran – mastering
- Tony Draper – executive producer, coordinator
- Pen & Pixel – artwork, design, layout

== Charts ==
Chart (1997)	Peak position
US Billboard 200	26
US Top R&B Albums (Billboard)	4
