= Due Season =

2007 album by Kia Shine

Studio album by Kia Shine
- Released: July 31, 2007
- Recorded: 2006–07
- Genre: Hip-hop
- Length: 1:19:44
- Labels: Rap Hustlaz; Universal Motown
- Producers: Sylvia Rhone; Tabari Sturdivant; Rap Hustlaz; Play-N-Skillz; Street Knock; T-Mix; Triz Wiz; Young Sean

Singles from Due Season
- 1. "Krispy" Released: April 24, 2007

Professional ratings
Review scores
Source	Rating
PopMatters	3/10
RapReviews	5/10
XXL	3/5 (L)

Due Season is the only album by the American rapper Kia Shine. It was released on July 31, 2007 through Rap Hustlaz and Universal Motown Records. Production was handled by Play-N-Skillz, Rap Hustlaz, Street Knock, T-Mix, Triz Wiz and Young Sean. It features guest appearances from Jack Frost, Wifey, 8Ball & MJG, Erika "Kane" Yancey and Jim Jones. The album peaked at number 84 on the US Billboard 200, and number 16 on the Top R&B/Hip-Hop Albums chart. A bonus track, "Due Season", is about how Shine became a rapper and producer.

== Track listing ==
No.	Title	Length
1.	"Pre Season"	4:18
2.	"Krispy"	4:27
3.	"W.O.W."	4:50
4.	"I Be Everywhere" (featuring Jim Jones)	5:18
5.	"Swag Music"	5:00
6.	"Respect My Fresh" (featuring Jack Frost)	5:17
7.	"Bluff City Classic" (featuring 8Ball & MJG)	5:49
8.	"Stunna Frames" (featuring Jack Frost)	4:22
9.	"Face Card"	4:59
10.	"Touch" (featuring Jack Frost & Wifey)	4:14
11.	"Tech Game"	4:34
12.	"She Serious" (featuring Wifey)	4:47
13.	"Holla at Ya Kin Folk" (featuring Erika "Kane" Yancey)	4:07
14.	"Aiight"	6:09
15.	"Due Season"	11:33
Total length:		1:19:44

== Chart positions ==
Chart (2007)	Peak position
US Billboard 200	84
US Top R&B/Hip-Hop Albums (Billboard)	16
