= Anotha Day Anotha Balla =

Studio album by South Circle
- Released: July 4, 1995
- Recorded: 1994–95
- Studio: Jus-Fresh Studio (Houston, TX)
- Genre: Southern hip hop; gangsta rap; g-funk
- Length: 59:04
- Label: Suave House; Relativity
- Producer: James Endsley (exec.); Tony Draper (exec.); Smoke One Productions

Mr. Mike chronology
Anotha Day Anotha Balla (1995)	Wicked Wayz (1996)

Singles from Anotha Day Anotha Balla
- 1. "Attitudes" Released: August 8, 1995; 2. "New Day" Released: November 7, 1995

Professional ratings
Review scores
Source	Rating
AllMusic	2.5/5 stars
RapReviews	7.5/10

Anotha Day Anotha Balla is the only studio album by American hip hop duo South Circle. It was released on July 4, 1995 through Suave House/Relativity Records. Recording sessions took place at Jus Fresh Recording Studio in Houston. Production was handled by Smoke One Productions, with James Endsley and Tony Draper serving as executive producers. It features guest appearances from 8Ball, Tela and MJG. The album was met with some success on the Billboard charts, peaking at number 63 on the Billboard 200 and number 8 on the Top R&B/Hip-Hop Albums. Two singles were released, "Attitudes" and "New Day", but neither made it to the Billboard charts.

== Track listing ==
All music is composed by Smoke One Productions.

No.	Title	Length
1.	"Intro"	1:53
2.	"Geto Madness"	3:20
3.	"It's Going Down"	4:56
4.	"New Day"	4:30
5.	"Unsolved Mysteries" (featuring 8Ball and Tela)	5:09
6.	"Pimp Thang"	4:10
7.	"Anotha Day Anotha Balla"	3:13
8.	"Attitudes"	6:45
9.	"Final Call"	4:10
10.	"No Escape" (featuring Tela and MJG)	3:30
11.	"Neva Take Me Alive"	3:45
12.	"Mental Murder"	4:32
13.	"Gotta Maintain" (featuring 8Ball)	4:33
14.	"Everyday Allday"	4:38
Total length:		59:04

Sample credits

- Track 8 contains a sample from "Attitudes" written by Allen Jones, James Alexander, Larry Dodson, Winston Stewart, Michael Beard, Charles Allen, Harvey Henderson, Lloyd Smith and Frank Thompson.

== Personnel ==
- Michael "Mr. Mike" Walls – main performer
- Rex "Thorough" Robeson – main performer
- Premro "8Ball" Smith – backing vocals
- Winston "Tela" Rogers – backing vocals
- Marlon "MJG" Goodwin – backing vocals
- Smoke One Productions – producer
- Clay "Jus Fresh" James – engineering, recording, mixing
- Brian "Big Bass" Gardner – mastering
- Tony "T-Money" Draper – executive producer, project coordinator
- James Endsley – executive producer
- Pen & Pixel – artwork, design

== Charts ==
=== Weekly charts ===
Chart (1995–1996)	Peak position
US Billboard 200	63
US Top R&B/Hip-Hop Albums (Billboard)	8

=== Year-end charts ===
Chart (1995)	Position
US Top R&B/Hip-Hop Albums (Billboard)	83
