= On the Outside Looking In =

On the Outside Looking In may refer to:

- On the Outside Looking In (album), a 1994 album by Eightball & MJG
- "On the Outside Looking In" (Friday Night Lights), an episode of the TV series
- "On the Outside Looking In", a song recorded by Flanagan and Allen and Harry Roy & His Orchestra
- "I'm on the Outside (Looking In)", a 1964 song by Little Anthony & The Imperials
- ""Outside Looking In", a 2006 song by Jordan Pruitt
