= All in the Game =

Studio album by Crime Boss
- Released: February 7, 1995
- Recorded: 1994
- Genre: Gangsta rap, Southern hip hop
- Label: Draper
- Producer: T-Mix, 8Ball & MJG

Crime Boss chronology
All in the Game (1995)	Conflicts & Confusion (1997)

Professional ratings
Review scores
Source	Rating
AllMusic	2/5 stars

All in the Game is the debut album by rapper Crime Boss. It was released on February 7, 1995, through Suave House Records, with production by T-Mix and 8Ball & MJG.

The album peaked at number 113 on the Billboard 200 and 11 on the Top R&B/Hip-Hop Albums. "The Chick" was released as a single and had a music video shot for it, but it did not reach the Billboard charts.

== Track listing ==
1. "Intro" – 1:22
2. "All in the Game" – 3:45
3. "Put Em Up" – 5:26
4. "Story Goes" – 4:02 ft. 8-Ball
5. "Fry" – 1:55
6. "Big Chiefing" – 4:29 ft. Rodney Ellis
7. "Recognize" – 4:14
8. "Dreaming" – 4:40
9. "Point of No Return" – 5:10 ft. South Circle
10. "The Chick" – 5:05 ft. MJG
11. "Going Off" – 3:37
12. "Come and Get Some (Outro)" – 5:03

== Charts ==
=== Weekly charts ===
Chart (1995)	Peak position
US Billboard 200	113
US Top Heatseekers Albums (Billboard)	2
US Top R&B/Hip-Hop Albums (Billboard)	11

=== Year-end charts ===
Chart (1995)	Position
US Top R&B/Hip-Hop Albums (Billboard)	66
