= Wicked Wayz =

Studio album by Mr. Mike
- Released: July 30, 1996
- Recorded: 1995–96
- Studio: Dallas Sound Lab
- Genre: Southern hip hop; gangsta rap; g-funk
- Length: 56:38
- Label: Suave House; Relativity
- Producer: Tony Draper (exec.); E-A-Ski & CMT; Smoke One Productions

Mr. Mike chronology
Anotha Day Anotha Balla (1995)	Wicked Wayz (1996)	Rhapsody (1999)

Singles from Wicked Wayz
- 1. "Where Ya Love At" Released: August 20, 1996

Professional ratings
Review scores
Source	Rating
AllMusic	1.5/5 stars

Wicked Wayz is the debut solo studio album by American rapper Mr. Mike. It was released on July 30, 1996 through Suave House/Relativity Records. Production was handled by Smoke One Productions, E-A-Ski & CMT, with Tony Draper serving as executive producer. It features guest appearances from 8Ball & MJG, Christión, E-A-Ski, Ice Cube, N.O.L.A. and O.C. The album peaked at number 29 on the Billboard 200 and number 5 on the Top R&B/Hip-Hop Albums chart. Its lead single, "Where Ya Love At?", reached #87 on the Hot R&B/Hip-Hop Songs and #40 on the Hot Rap Songs.

== Track listing ==
No.	Title	Writer(s)	Producer(s)	Length
1.	"Intro"	Shon Adams; Mark Ogleton	E-A-Ski; CMT	1:35
2.	"Southwest" (featuring E-A-Ski)	Mike Walls; Adams; Ogleton	E-A-Ski; CMT	3:46
3.	"G's Perspective"	Walls	E-A-Ski; CMT	3:30
4.	"Where Ya Love At" (featuring Christión)	Walls	E-A-Ski; CMT	4:24
5.	"Total Shock"	Walls	Smoke One Productions	3:45
6.	"Untouchable" (featuring Nina Creque)	Walls; Barry Ware; Nina Creque	Smoke One Productions	3:56
7.	"Can You Feel Me"	Walls	Smoke One Productions	4:12
8.	"Midtro: Here's Your Ticket"	Walls	Smoke One Productions	1:05
9.	"Wicked Wayz" (featuring Ice Cube)	Walls; O'Shea Jackson	Smoke One Productions	4:05
10.	"Da Boogie Man"	Walls	E-A-Ski; CMT	4:11
11.	"Dope Fiction" (featuring O.C. of The Scientists)	Walls; Ware	Smoke One Productions	4:15
12.	"Game Affiliation"	Walls	E-A-Ski; CMT	3:21
13.	"In the Midst of Smoke" (featuring Nola)	Walls; Toni Hickman; Tylene Mercadel	Smoke One Productions	4:27
14.	"Life on tha Line"	Walls	Smoke One Productions	3:43
15.	"Stop Lying" (featuring 8Ball & MJG)	Walls; Premro Smith; Marlon Goodwin	Smoke One Productions	4:31
Total length:				56:38

== Charts ==
Chart performance for Wicked Wayz
Chart (1996)	Peak position
US Billboard 200	29
US Top R&B/Hip-Hop Albums (Billboard)	5
