= Album of the Year =

Album of the Year, often abbreviated to AOTY, may refer to:

== Awards ==
- Aotearoa Music Award for Album of the Year, New Zealand
- ARIA Award for Album of the Year, Australia
- Brit Award for British Album of the Year, UK
- Country Music Association Award for Album of the Year, US
- Golden Melody Award for Album of the Year, Taiwan
- Grammy Award for Album of the Year, US
- The Headies Award for Album of the Year, Nigeria
- Juno Award for Album of the Year, Canada
- Latin Grammy Award for Album of the Year, US/international
- Lo Nuestro Award for Album of the Year, US/international
- MAMA Award for Album of the Year, South Korea/Asia
- MTV Video Music Award for Album of the Year, US
- Multishow Brazilian Music Award for Album of the Year, Brazil

== Albums ==
- Album of the Year (Art Blakey album), 1981
- Album of the Year (Black Milk album), 2010
- Album of the Year (Faith No More album), 1997
- Album of the Year (The Good Life album) or the title song, 2004
- The Album of the Year, a compilation album from Suave House Records, 1997

== Songs ==
- "Album of the Year (Freestyle)", a song by J. Cole, 2018

== See also ==
- Record of the Year (disambiguation)
