= Off da Chain Volume 1 2000 =

Compilation album by Various artists
- Released: March 21, 2000
- Genre: Southern hip hop
- Length: 52:47
- Label: Suave House; Artemis
- Producer: Tony Draper (exec.); Jeffery "J Dub" Walker; Mo-Suave-A

Suave House Records compilation albums chronology
The Album of the Year (1997)	Off da Chain Volume 1 2000 (2000)

Singles from Off da Chain Volume 1 2000
- 1. "Shine / Do It Like That" Released: 2000; 2. "Shake It Off" Released: 2000

Professional ratings
Review scores
Source	Rating
AllMusic	2.5/5 stars

Off da Chain Volume 1 2000 is a compilation album presented by American hip hop record label Suave House Records. It was released on March 21, 2000, and features contributions from 8Ball & MJG, Gillie Da Kid, Lil' Noah, Toni Hickman, AB Luva, Chico DeBarge, Clinic, Joe, Mr. Charlie and Psychodrama. The album debuted at number 158 on the Billboard 200, number 36 on the Top R&B/Hip-Hop Albums and number 12 on the Independent Albums.

== Track listing ==
No.	Title	Length
1.	"Intro" (performed by 8Ball)	1:32
2.	"We Got Them Things for You" (performed by 8Ball)	3:44
3.	"Do It Like That" (performed by Gillie da Kid & AB Luva)	4:10
4.	"Do You Wanna Ride" (performed by Toni Hickman)	4:24
5.	"Shine" (performed by Lil' Noah)	4:28
6.	"Money, Sex & Drugs" (performed by Gillie da Kid & AB Luva)	3:22
7.	"Get Money" (performed by Clinic)	4:22
8.	"Shake It Off" (performed by 8Ball, MJG, Chico DeBarge & Joe)	4:31
9.	"Something to Bounce To" (performed by Gillie da Kid)	3:20
10.	"Done That" (performed by Lil' Noah)	4:13
11.	"Evil & Innocence" (performed by Psycho Drama)	3:49
12.	"For da Luv" (performed by 8Ball & Gillie da Kid)	3:46
13.	"Life Got a Loaded Gun" (performed by Toni Hickman)	3:09
14.	"Bad Muthafucka" (performed by Mr. Charlie)	3:57
Total length:		52:47

== Charts ==
Chart (2000)	Peak position
US Billboard 200	158
US Top R&B/Hip-Hop Albums (Billboard)	36
US Independent Albums (Billboard)	12
