= Rhapsody (Mr. Mike album) =

Studio album by Mr. Mike
- Released: September 7, 1999
- Recorded: 1997–99
- Genre: Southern hip hop; gangsta rap
- Length: 1:02:11
- Label: Priority
- Producer: Marvin Watkins (exec.); Mr. Mike (also exec.); Dah Dah; DJ Battlecat; Fredwreck; Gerardo Hernandez; Mike B.

Mr. Mike chronology
Wicked Wayz (1996)	Rhapsody (1999)	Piping Hot (2003)

Singles from Rhapsody
- 1. "Texas 2000" Released: August 10, 1999

Professional ratings
Review scores
Source	Rating
AllMusic	4/5 stars
The Source	3.5/5 stars

Rhapsody is the second solo studio album by American rapper Mr. Mike. It was released on September 7, 1999 through Priority Records. Production was handled by DJ Battlecat, Dah Dah, Mike B., Gerardo Hernandez, Fredwreck, and Mr. Mike himself. It features guest appearances from Napp-1, Mack 10, Ras Kass and Jennifer Brumfield. The album peaked at number 172 on the Billboard 200 and number 36 on the Top R&B/Hip-Hop Albums chart. Its lead single, "Texas 2000", reached #93 on the Hot R&B/Hip-Hop Songs and #13 on the Hot Rap Songs.

== Track listing ==
No.	Title	Producer(s)	Length
1.	"Intro"	Gerardo Hernandez	1:38
2.	"Rhapsody"	Mr. Mike; Gerardo Hernandez (co.)	4:05
3.	"Texas 2000 (Give 'Em What They Want)"	DJ Battlecat	4:11
4.	"It's a Shame" (featuring Napp-1)	DJ Battlecat	3:59
5.	"Ghetto Strain" (featuring Napp-1)	Mike B.	4:06
6.	"Gasoline Station" (Skit)		0:33
7.	"Why Fall in Love With the Struggle" (featuring Mack 10)	DJ Battlecat	3:57
8.	"Come on Everybody"	Dah-Dah	5:15
9.	"Killing Fields"	Mr. Mike; Gerardo Hernandez (co.)	4:30
10.	"How Tha South Was Won"	Fredwreck	4:08
11.	"Partners in Crime"	Mr. Mike; DJ Battlecat (co.)	4:12
12.	"What da Deal Iz"	Mike B.	4:07
13.	"Don't Nobody Really Care"	DJ Battlecat	3:55
14.	"Know One Knows" (featuring Napp-1)	Mr. Mike; DJ Battlecat (co.)	4:58
15.	"Play the Cards I Was Given" (featuring Ras Kass)	Mr. Mike; DJ Battlecat (co.)	4:01
16.	"Every Time I Close My Eyes" (featuring Jennifer Brumfield)	Dah-Dah	4:37
Total length:			1:02:11

== Personnel ==
- Michael "Mr. Mike" Walls – main artist, producer (tracks: 2, 9, 11, 14, 15), mixing (tracks: 2, 5, 8-10, 12, 16), executive producer
- Napp-1 – featured artist (tracks: 4, 5, 14)
- Dedrick "Mack 10" Rolison – featured artist (track 7)
- John "Ras Kass" Austin – featured artist (track 15)
- Jennifer Brumfield – featured artist (track 16)
- Gerardo Hernandez – producer (track 1), co-producer (tracks: 2, 9), mixing (tracks: 2, 5, 8-10, 12, 16)
- Kevin "DJ Battlecat" Gilliam – producer (tracks: 3, 4, 7, 13), co-producer (tracks: 11, 14, 15), mixing (tracks: 3, 4, 7, 11, 13-15)
- Michael "Mike B." Banks – producer (tracks: 5, 12)
- Dante "Dah-Dah" Powell – producer (tracks: 8, 16)
- Farid "Fredwreck" Nassar – producer (track 10)
- Kris Solem – mastering
- Marvin Watkins – executive producer, A&R
- Art Shoji – art direction
- Manuel J. Donayre – art direction, digital artwork, design
- William Hames – photography
- Marlene C. Durio – A&R
- Joe Early – management
- Ron Early Jr. – management

== Charts ==
Chart performance for Rhapsody
Chart (1999)	Peak position
US Billboard 200	172
US Top R&B/Hip-Hop Albums (Billboard)	36
