= Memphis Under World =

Compilation album by Eightball & MJG
- Released: February 22, 2000
- Recorded: 1992–2000
- Genre: Gangsta rap, Southern hip hop
- Length: 44:11
- Label: OTS
- Producer: Calvin Rhodes, D.J. Zirk, Eight Ball, M.J.G., Reginald Boyland

Eightball & MJG chronology
In Our Lifetime (1999)	Memphis Under World (2000)	Space Age 4 Eva (2000)

Professional ratings
Review scores
Source	Rating
Allmusic	2/5 stars

Memphis Under World compiles previously released and rare tracks from Eightball & MJG's earlier days, as well as appearances on other artists' projects. It was released in 2000.

== Track listing ==
1. Armed Robbery (MJG solo)
2. Kick Dat Shit
3. Lock'em N Da Trunk (featuring DJ Zirk, 2 Thick)
4. Break Da Law (featuring Three 6 Mafia, Project Pat)
5. Playas Dream (Eightball solo)
6. Who Got Dem 9's (featuring Juicy J, Project Pat)
7. Got's To Be Real (Eightball solo)
8. Pimp N My Own Rhymes (MJG solo)
9. Listen To Da Lyrics
10. Wild Boy
11. Whatcha Doing
