= Single of the Year =

Single of the Year may refer to:

- Aotearoa Music Award for Single of the Year
- ARIA Award for Single of the Year
- Juno Award for Single of the Year
- NME Single of the Year

== See also ==
- Song of the Year (disambiguation)
