= Kia Shine =

American rapper

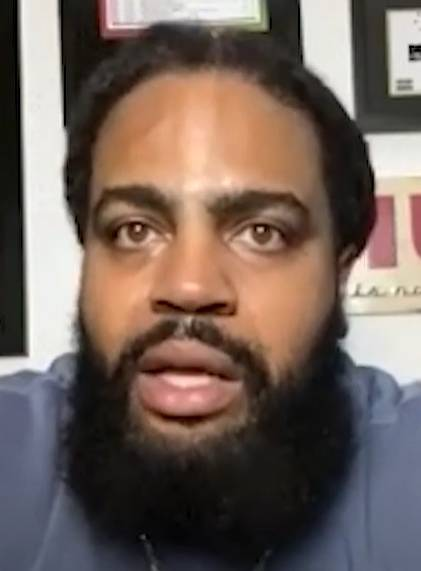
- Kia Shine in 2023

Background information
- Also known as: Nakia Shine, Kinfolk Jones, Kinfolk Kia Shine
- Origin: Memphis, Tennessee, United States
- Genres: Hip hop
- Occupations: Rapper; record producer; songwriter
- Years active: 1998–present
- Labels: Diamond Cut; Rap Hustlaz; Universal; Kinfolk Music Group
- Website: twitter.com/therealkiashine

Kia Shine is an American rapper, songwriter and record producer from Memphis, Tennessee. He is known for his debut single "Krispy", which is also the lead single from his 2007 debut album Due Season.

== Music career ==
=== 2006–2007: Due Season ===
In August 2006, he hosted an episode of BET's Rap City. Shine's debut single is "Krispy". The song peaked at number 66 on the US Billboard Hot R&B/Hip-Hop Songs chart and number 24 on the Hot Rap Tracks chart. Shine's major label debut, Due Season, was released on Universal Records on July 31, 2007.

In September 2010 Kia Shine won another BMI award for his contribution to the lyrics of Drake "Best I Ever Had".

== Controversy ==
=== Drake ===
Kia Shine stated that he owned 25% of Drake's "Best I Ever Had", which Drake later denied. Kia Shine later received 4 BMI awards and a Grammy nomination for his credit on "Best I Ever Had".

== Discography ==
=== Studio albums ===
- 2007: Due Season

=== EPs ===
- 2008: The Kush - EP
- 2009: Checkin' My Fresh - EP
- 2010: Club Walmart (Single)
- 2010: Dreads - EP
- 2011: Newmonia (Single)

=== Mixtapes ===
- 2009: 2000Shine
- 2010: The Alarm Clock Theory
- 2011: Memphis Beat

=== Singles ===
Year	Song	Chart positions			Album
Year	Song	U.S. Hot 100	U.S. R&B	U.S. Rap	Album
2007	"Krispy"	107	66	24	Due Season
2007	"W.O.W."	-	125	-	Due Season
2009	"Checkin' My Fresh" (featuring Young Dro and Maino)	-	-	-	2000Shine
2010	"Club Walmart" (featuring Yung Joc)	-	-	-	TBA
