= Life's Quest =

Studio album by 8Ball
- Released: July 24, 2012
- Recorded: 2011–12
- Genre: Hip hop
- Length: 51:31
- Label: E1 Music

8Ball chronology
Doin' It Big (2008)	Life's Quest (2012)

Singles from Life's Quest
- 1. "Good Girl Bad Girl" Released: May 18, 2012

Life's Quest is the fifth solo studio album by American rapper 8Ball. It was released on July 24, 2012, through E1 Music. It features guest appearances from 2 Chainz, Angie Stone, Big K.R.I.T., Ebony Love, Keelyn Ellis, LC, MJG, Singa and Slim.

The album debuted at number 116 on the Billboard 200 chart, with first-week sales of 3,800 copies in the United States.

== Critical reception ==
Professional ratings
Aggregate scores
Source	Rating
Metacritic	75/100
Review scores
Source	Rating
AllMusic	3.5/5 stars
RapReviews	8/10
XXL	4/5 (XL)

Life's Quest was met with generally favorable reviews from music critics. At Metacritic, which assigns a normalized rating out of 100 to reviews from mainstream publications, the album received an average score of 75, based on five reviews.

Pete T. of RapReviews stated: "a mature performance over sleek, fresh production makes Life's Quest a pleasure". Neil Martinez-Belkin of XXL called it "an LP that accurately reflects 8Ball's place as one of the finest elder statesmen of southern rap". AllMusic's David Jeffries wrote: "if 8Ball always seemed more moonshine than fine wine, Life's Quest suggests he can still get better with age and go down smooth when you let him mellow".

== Track listing ==
No.	Title	Length
1.	"Indestructible" (featuring Keelyn Ellis)	5:03
2.	"This That" (featuring Singa)	4:37
3.	"We Buy Gold" (featuring MJG and Big K.R.I.T.)	2:57
4.	"GoThatAWay" (featuring LC)	4:16
5.	"Don't Bring Me Down" (featuring 2 Chainz)	4:13
6.	"Good Girl Bad Girl"	3:30
7.	"Touch"	4:35
8.	"The Price" (featuring Ebony Love)	4:06
9.	"Life's Quest" (featuring Angie Stone)	5:21
10.	"Lucky's Theme Song"	3:59
11.	"You'll Never Know"	4:48
12.	"Good Days" (featuring Slim)	4:06
Total length:		51:31

== Charts ==
Chart (2012)	Peak position
US Billboard 200	116
US Top R&B/Hip-Hop Albums (Billboard)	14
US Independent Albums (Billboard)	22
