= Rise to Power (Rick Ross album) =

Compilation album by Rick Ross
- Released: September 18, 2007
- Recorded: 2000–2007
- Genres: Southern hip hop, gangsta rap
- Label: Suave House

Rick Ross chronology
Port of Miami (2006)	Rise to Power (2007)	Trilla (2008)

Singles from Rise to Power
- 1. "Get That Bread" Released: September 3, 2007

Professional ratings
Review scores
Source	Rating
Music for America	(favorable)
RapReviews	(6/10)

Rise to Power is the first compilation album by American rapper Rick Ross. The album was released on September 18, 2007.

The album is not intended as a follow-up to Port of Miami, but a collection of unreleased material that Ross recorded while at Suave House Records before signing to Slip-n-Slide/Def Jam.

== Commercial performance ==
Rise to Power debuted at number 62 on the US Billboard 200 chart. In its second week, the album fell to number 164 on the Billboard 200, selling 4,000 copies, for a two-week total of 16,000 units.

== Track listing ==
#	Title	Producer(s)	Time
1	"It's On" (featuring Noah & Jiggolo)	Jiggolo	3:37
2	"Hold Me Down"	Mo-Suave-A Productions	3:56
3	"Get That Bread" (featuring Cinque & Big Duke)	Jiggolo	3:50
4	"Skit"		1:09
5	"Street Love" (featuring T-Low)	Kay Gee	4:13
6	"Strapped" (featuring Noah)	Jiggolo	3:32
7	"Prove Me Wrong" (featuring Devin the Dude)	Jiggolo	3:45
8	"Bird Bath" (featuring Noah)	Mo-Suave-A Productions	4:15
9	"B.L.O.W. (Block Life Is Our Way)" (featuring Clipse)	Om'Mas Keith	4:15
10	"Realest Niggas" (featuring Gillie Da Kid & Reed Dollaz)	Ruggs	3:51
11	"Simple And Plain"	Mo-Suave-A Productions	3:48
12	"Dear Lord" (featuring Scarface)	Mo-Suave-A Productions	3:04
13	"Skit"		0:29
14	"Been" (Bonus Jiggolo Track)	Jiggolo	4:20
15	"Breathe In, Breathe Out" (Bonus Jiggolo Track)	Jiggolo	4:32
16	"737" (Bonus Jiggolo Track)	Jiggolo	4:49

== Charts ==
=== Weekly charts ===
Chart (2007)	Peak position
US Billboard 200	62
US Top R&B/Hip-Hop Albums (Billboard)	6
US Top Rap Albums (Billboard)	6
