= Pimp Tight =

Studio album by MJG
- Released: April 29, 2008
- Recorded: 2007
- Genre: Hip hop
- Label: Real Talk Entertainment
- Producer: Derrick "Sac" Johnson, Cozmo, Big Hollis

MJG chronology
No More Glory (1997)	Pimp Tight (2008)	This Might Be the Day (2008)

Pimp Tight is the second solo studio album by American rapper MJG. The album was released on April 29, 2008, by Real Talk Entertainment.

== Track listing ==
No.	Title	Length
1.	"Ya'll Ain't Ready"	1:36
2.	"Pimp Tight"	4:30
3.	"Get Yo Ass Up" (featuring 8Ball)	4:32
4.	"The Truth"	0:20
5.	"Get You a Hoe"	3:24
6.	"High Like An Eagle"	3:58
7.	"Big Stakes"	0:46
8.	"At Last"	3:28
9.	"My Life, This Way"	3:56
10.	"I Still Lay It Down"	3:31
11.	"I Tried"	3:59
12.	"Whatever I Wanna Do"	3:33
13.	"Small Town Girl"	3:38
14.	"It Ain't Over"	1:36
