= Evil Pimp =

American rapper

- Also known as: Evil Peezy; Da Underground King
- Born: Catrin Terrell Rhodes; May 17, 1981 (age 45)
- Origin: Cedar Rapids, Iowa, U.S.
- Genres: Hip-hop; gangsta rap; horrorcore; hardcore hip hop; trap
- Occupations: Rapper; songwriter; record producer; entrepreneur
- Instruments: Vocals; synthesizers; keyboards; turntables; drum machine; sampler
- Years active: 1996–present
- Label: Gangsta Ro Productions

Catrin Terrell Rhodes (born May 17, 1981), known professionally as Evil Pimp (alternatively by his alter-ego name of Stan Man), is an American rapper and record producer. He is the founder of the Krucifix Klan and has produced for and overseen the careers of many rappers, including Playa Rob, Ms. Insain, Suave C, Creep Lo, Lady Dead, Chuck G, Sir Lance, DJ Slikk, Killa Queen, Drama Queen, Crazy Mane, Lil Bone, Gangsta Rip, DJ Massacre, Reese G, Lil Jerk, Lil Boosie, HR2, Ms Loko, Polo Fresh, Ill B, Killa Elite, Evil Prince, SkiMask Yama, Rip Manzon (FKA Lil Ripsta) and many more. He is credited as a key figure in the crafting and popularization of "horrorcore", a rap style characterized as hypnotic beats and dark themes—especially drugs, sex, and violence.

== Music career ==
=== Beginnings ===
Evil Pimp began his career in the 1990s, when at the time he lived in Cedar Rapids. Although he began recording in 1996, his professional entertainment career did not take off until January 2005 when his previous year's solo album Da Exorcist Returns reached No. 5 on the Billboard top internet album sales chart. The talent and production showcased on the album has been admired by a large part of the underground hip hop community. The album is frequently recognized as one of the crowning achievements of "horrorcore" rap music. He was also featured in various magazines, most significantly appearing in The Source Magazine.

In 1998, Rhodes formed the group Krucifix Klan with a number of his friends from Iowa, including Playa Rob, Crazy Mane, Creep Lo, Stan Man and Drama Queen. The group released their debut album Da Krucifixin on June 15, 2004. Later in the year, Evil Pimp released The Exorcist Greatest Hits Volume 1, which was a compilation of tracks from some of his initial underground cassettes.

=== Production work ===
Rhodes has worked with an array of acts that span within the underground rap scene and has helped produce many albums for various artists. He uses a variety of production equipment to compose hip hop beats. He primarily uses an Akai MPC 4000, Pro Tools, Logic Pro, Roland TR-808 and electronic keyboards manufactured by Korg, Roland and Yamaha.

Evil Pimp cites hip hop group Three 6 Mafia as his signature music production inspirations with other musical influences ranging from DJ Zirk to DJ Squeeky.

== Discography ==
=== Solo projects ===
| Year | Official Album(s) |
|---|---|
| 1998 | Evil Pimp- Bring It On |
| 2003 | Evil Pimp- Kreepin Out Tha Kut |
| 2004 | Evil Pimp- Da Exorcist Returns |
| 2004 | Evil Pimp- The Exorcist Greatest Hits Volume 1 |
| 2005 | Evil Pimp- The Exorcist Greatest Hits Volume 2 |
| 2006 | Evil Pimp- Go Hard Or Go Home |
| 2007 | Evil Pimp- Da Bad Guy Returns |
| 2009 | Evil Pimp- Face The Terror |
| 2015 | Evil Pimp- Da Devils Rejects |
| 2019 | Evil Pimp- No Bigga Pimps |
| 2019 | Evil Pimp- Gangsta Music |
| 2019 | Evil Pimp- Drop It Off |
| 2019 | Evil Pimp- Born 2 Mack |
| 2019 | Evil Pimp- Certified |
| 2022 | Evil Pimp- Street Smart |

=== Group projects ===
| Year | Official Album(s) |
|---|---|
| 2004 | Krucifix Klan- Fuckin' Wit Dis Klan |
| 2004 | Krucifix Klan- Da Krucifixin |
| 2006 | Krucifix Klan- Da Last Krucifixin |
| 2007 | Krucifix Klan- Death Wish |
| 2014 | Krucifix Klan- Mark Of The Beast |
| 2019 | Krucifix Klan- Genesis |
| 2019 | Krucifix Klan- Ashes 2 Ashes |
| 2019 | Krucifix Klan- Revelations |
| 2019 | Krucifix Klan- Da Resurrection |
| 2019 | Krucifix Klan- Kings Of Kings |

=== Associate projects ===
| Year | Official Album(s) |
|---|---|
| 1999 | Creep Lo- You Aint Seen Nothin Yet |
| 2019 | Playa Rob- Playa Thang |
| 2019 | Stan Man- Stan From Da Klan |

=== Underground projects ===
| Year | Cassette(s) |
|---|---|
| 1996 | 187 Murder Click - First Degree Murder |
| 1996 | Bone Killaz - To Tha Test |
| 1996 | DD Bad Ass - Life Ain't No Fun |
| 1996 | DJ Massacre - Scratch Mix Pt. 1 |
| 1996 | DJ Massacre - Scratch Mix Pt. 2 |
| 1996 | Gangsta Scan - Blunts Burn |
| 1996 | Lil Cap - Blastin Puncho |
| 1996 | Lil Cash (aka Evil Pimp) - Gettin Cash Money |
| 1996 | Reese G' - Cemetary Made |
| 1997 | Bone Killaz - Fuck What Ya Heard |
| 1997 | Death Trilogy - 2 Thick |
| 1997 | DJ Massacre - Fuck All You Hoes |
| 1997 | DJ Massacre - Scratch Mix Pt. 3 |
| 1997 | DJ Massacre - Slangin Tapes Out Da Trunk |
| 1997 | Lil Cap - Ghetto Bass Pt. 2 |
| 1997 | Lil Cash (aka Evil Pimp) - Hog Killing |
| 1997 | Lil Jerk - Bitches Suffer |
| 1997 | Nigga G' - Nigga Shit |
| 1998 | Death Trilogy - Ashes 2 Ashes |
| 1998 | DJ Massacre - Scratch Mix Pt. 4 |
| 1998 | DJ Massacre - Drop It Off Fast |
| 1998 | Evil Pimp & DJ Massacre - Make Money, Pimp Hoes |
| 1998 | Evil Pimp & DJ Massacre - You My Enemy |
| 1998 | Gangsta Scan - Scan Da Man |
| 1998 | Lil Cap & Dirty Red - Lock Yo Doors |
| 1998 | Paul Creep - Low Jacks |
| 1998 | Reese G' - Bite Our Style |
| 1999 | DJ Massacre - Bass Boom |
| 1998 | DJ Massacre - Scratch Mix Pt. 5 |
| 1999 | Dr. Pimp - Operation Pimp Dat Bitch |
| 1999 | Evil Pimp & Poppa G' - Ashes To Ashes Part 2 |
| 1999 | Evil Pimp & Poppa G' - We Gon' Get Paid |
| 1999 | Lil Cap- Capeelin |
| 1999 | Nigga G' - Nigga Shit Pt. 2 |
| 1999 | Playa Mafia - Westwood Bound |
| 1999 | Reese G' - Tung Twist Mix |
| 2000 | DJ Massacre - Wateva Manne |
| 2000 | Insane Gangstaz - Insane |
| 2000 | Lil Trent - Scalin Triple Beams |
| 2000 | Playa Mafia - We Tha Mafia |
| 2001 | Evil Pimp & Poppa G' - Up The River |
