= Lost (8Ball album) =

Studio album by Eightball
- Released: May 19, 1998
- Recorded: 1997–1998
- Genre: Hip hop
- Length: 115min
- Label: Draper Inc. Records
- Producers: Tony Draper, T-Mix, Jones & Draper Company, Tone Capone, The Legendary Traxster, Ant Banks, Carlos Stephens, N.O. Joe

Eightball chronology
Lost (1998)	Almost Famous (2001)

Professional ratings
Review scores
Source	Rating
AllMusic	3/5 stars
Los Angeles Times	3.5/4 stars
RapReviews	8/10
Rolling Stone	3/5 stars
The Source	4/5 stars
USA Today	3/4 stars

Lost is the debut solo studio album by American rapper Eightball. It is a double album, released on May 19, 1998, by Draper Inc. Records. 8Ball had already released three albums as a part of the group 8Ball & MJG, but after 1995's On Top of the World the group decided to make solo albums before reuniting as a group. This was the second of the group's solo albums, being released after MJG's No More Glory. This album has been certified Platinum by the RIAA for selling 1.8 million copies in the U.S. The song "Drama in My Life" featuring Psycho Drama was first featured on the soundtrack album to the 1998 film Woo and "Let's Ride" featuring MJG was first heard on the I Got the Hook-Up soundtrack released earlier the same year.

== Track listing ==
Disc one
No.	Title	Length
1.	"Intro"	2:28
2.	"Put tha House on It"	4:39
3.	"All 4 Nuthin'"	4:56
4.	"Bounce wit Me"	3:57
5.	"Drama in My Life" (featuring Psycho Drama)	5:28
6.	"My Homeboy's Girlfriend"	4:37
7.	"Stompin' and Pimpin'" (featuring MJG)	4:50
8.	"Backyard Mississippi" (featuring Goodie Mob)	3:58
9.	"If I Die"	5:07
10.	"The Artist Pays the Price"	5:30
11.	"Get Money" (featuring Busta Rhymes)	4:46
12.	"Ghetto Luv"	4:35
13.	"All On Me"	2:04
14.	"Lost"	4:52

Disc two
No.	Title	Length
1.	"360°" (featuring Rappin' 4-Tay, Spice 1, E-40 & Otis & Shug)	4:37
2.	"Let's Ride" (featuring MJG)	3:59
3.	"Time"	4:30
4.	"Coffee Shop" (featuring Redman)	5:03
5.	"Pure Uncut" (featuring Master P, Silkk the Shocker, Mystikal & Psycho Drama)	4:40
6.	"Down and Out"	3:55
7.	"Put Your Hands Up" (featuring MJG)	3:44
8.	"Ball and Bun" (featuring Bun B)	4:32
9.	"I Don't Wanna Die"	4:52
10.	"My First Love"	4:27
11.	"Get Bucked"	4:39
12.	"This Is Dedicated" (featuring Phoenix Johnson)	4:42

Disc 3 (Bonus 1998 version)
No.	Title	Length
1.	"Ill Hill Niggas" (Ill Hill Billies)	4:09
2.	"Been Done Some Shit" (Psycho Drama)	4:33
3.	"How We Roll" (Canibus & Panama P.I.)	4:15
4.	"Scummie" (Crucial Conflict)	4:33
5.	"What You Weigh Me" (A+ & MJG)	4:12
6.	"Many Know" (McGruff)	3:31
7.	"Incarcerated Minds" (MJG)	4:35
8.	"Class in Session" (Thorough)	4:37
9.	"Baby Baby" (The Reepz)	4:02
10.	"The Moocher" (Fa Sho featuring Coldhard)	4:55
11.	"All the Way" (Rodney Ellis)	4:43
12.	"Can't Stop" (Too Short & Eightball & M.J.G.)	6:05

== Charts ==
=== Weekly charts ===
Chart (1998)	Peak position
US Billboard 200	5
US Top R&B/Hip-Hop Albums (Billboard)	3

=== Year-end charts ===
Chart (1998)	Position
US Billboard 200	197
US Top R&B/Hip-Hop Albums (Billboard)	57
