= Lyrics of a Pimp =

Compilation album by Eightball & MJG
- Released: December 23, 1997
- Recorded: 1992
- Genre: Southern hip hop; gangsta rap
- Label: TAM; OTS; Omni
- Producer: Eightball & MJG

Eightball & MJG chronology
On Top of the World (1995)	Lyrics of a Pimp (1997)	In Our Lifetime (1999)

Professional ratings
Review scores
Source	Rating
RapReviews.com	4.0/10 stars
Allmusic	2/5 stars

Lyrics of a Pimp is an underground rap album from Eightball & MJG. The album consisted of songs before their first album Comin' Out Hard. The songs were recorded from Omni Entertainment. It was re-release and remastered in 2004 with two other unreleased songs "Real in the Feel" and "Oh Nah-Nah-Nah".

== Track listing ==
1. Intro
2. Listen to the Lyrics
3. Kick da Shit
4. Pimp'N My Own Rhyme (MJG solo)
5. Niggas Like Us
6. Smokin' Chicken
7. Armed Robbery
8. Playaz Dream (Eightball solo)
9. The Fat Mack (Eightball solo)
10. Got 2 Be Real (Eightball solo)
11. Bitches
12. Listen to the Lyrics remix 2000
13. Pimps in the House (MJG solo)
14. It's a Pimp Thang
15. Real in the Feel (Patty Man)
16. Oh Nah-Nah-Nah (Kool Ace)
