= Song of the Year (disambiguation) =

The Grammy Award for Song of the Year is an honor presented at the Grammy Awards.

Song of the Year may also refer to:

- Country Music Association Award for Song of the Year
- Dove Award for Song of the Year
- Golden Melody Award for Song of the Year
- Grammis Song of the Year
- Latin Grammy Award for Song of the Year
- Mnet Asian Music Award for Song of the Year
- MTV Video Music Award for Song of the Year
- Pesnya goda (Russian: Песня года; Song of the Year), Soviet and Russian festival and award
- Soul Train Music Award for Best Song of the Year
- WAM Song of the Year

== See also ==
- MTV Video Music Award for Video of the Year
- Record of the Year (disambiguation)
- Single of the Year (disambiguation)
- Year of Song, a phrase used to describe Robert Schumann's prolific composing year of 1840
