= Record of the Year (disambiguation) =

Record of the Year may refer to:

- Grammy Award for Record of the Year
- Latin Grammy Award for Record of the Year
- The Record of the Year, a British award based on public polling
- Aotearoa Music Award for Radio Airplay Record of the Year
- Libera Award for Record of the Year

== See also ==
- Album of the Year (disambiguation)
