= Light Up the Bomb =

Studio album by 8Ball
- Released: October 10, 2006
- Recorded: 2005–2006
- Genre: Hip hop
- Length: 60:01
- Label: 8 Ways Entertainment Koch
- Producer: Montana Trax, MJG, B. Hood, Eightball

8Ball chronology
Lay It Down (2002)	Light Up the Bomb (2006)	The Vet & The Rookie (2007)

Professional ratings
Review scores
Source	Rating
AllMusic	3/5 stars
HipHopDX	3/5 stars

Light Up the Bomb the fourth studio album by American rapper 8Ball. The album was released on October 10, 2006, by 8 Ways Entertainment & Koch Records.

== Track listing ==
No.	Title	Length
1.	"M Gang" (featuring MJG)	7:11
2.	"Purple Stuff"	5:04
3.	"Swervin'"	4:06
4.	"Time2hitdaclub"	4:26
5.	"Da Fight"	0:21
6.	"Clear It Out"	3:30
7.	"Barney Phife"	1:54
8.	"Battle Field" (featuring Dirt Bag & Bigg Gipp)	5:25
9.	"Let It Be Known"	2:00
10.	"Sit Back"	4:28
11.	"Anotha Level"	4:33
12.	"This Ain't That" (featuring MJG)	4:03
13.	"Yo Bitch" (featuring MJG)	5:10
14.	"The Greatest" (featuring Juvenile)	4:07
15.	"Light Up Tha Bomb"	4:46

== Charts ==
Chart (2006)	Peak position
US Top R&B/Hip-Hop Albums (Billboard)	41
US Independent Albums (Billboard)	28
