= Living Legends (album) =

Studio album by 8Ball & MJG
- Released: May 11, 2004
- Recorded: 2002–2004
- Studio: Daddy's House Studios (New York, NY); Bangladesh Studios (Atlanta, GA); Circle House Studios (Miami, FL); Platinum Recording Studios (Houston, TX); Long Walk Studios (Atlanta, GA); Ludaplex Recording Studios (Atlanta, GA)
- Genre: Hip-hop
- Length: 1:12:09
- Label: Bad Boy; Universal
- Producer: Anthony "Scoe" Walker; Bangladesh; Cool & Dre; Davour; Deric "D-Dot" Angelettie; Gorilla Tek; Lil' Jon; Nashiem Myrick; Pop-Trax; Red Spyda; the Wunda Twinz; Vanex; Yogi "Sugar Bear" Graham

8Ball & MJG chronology
Space Age 4 Eva (2000)	Living Legends (2004)	Ridin High (2007)

Singles from Living Legends
- 1. "You Don't Want Drama" Released: 2004; 2. "Forever" Released: 2004

Professional ratings
Review scores
Source	Rating
AllHipHop	4/5 stars
AllMusic	4/5 stars
HipHopDX	3.5/5
RapReviews	8.5/10
Rolling Stone	2/5 stars

Living Legends is the sixth studio album by American hip hop duo 8Ball & MJG. It was released on May 11, 2004, via Bad Boy Records. The album was produced by Anthony "Scoe" Walker, Bangladesh, Cool & Dre, Davour, Deric "D-Dot" Angelettie, Gorilla Tek, Lil' Jon, Nashiem Myrick, Red Spyda, Stevie J, the Wunda Twinz, Vanex, and Yogi Bear. It features guest appearances from P. Diddy, 112, Bun B, Lloyd, Ludacris, Poo Bear, Shannon Jones, T.I., and Twista.

The album peaked at number 3 on the Billboard 200 and atop of both the Top R&B/Hip-Hop Albums and the Top Rap Albums charts in the United States. It was certified gold by the Recording Industry Association of America on July 20, 2004, for selling 500,000 copies in the US alone. Its lead single, "You Don't Want Drama", made it to number 30 on the Hot R&B/Hip-Hop Songs and number 22 on the Hot Rap Songs charts.

== Track listing ==
No.	Title	Writer(s)	Producer(s)	Length
1.	"Intro"	Sean Combs; Anthony Walker; Vangelis	Anthony "Scoe" Walker	1:14
2.	"You Don't Want Drama"	Premro Smith; Marlon Goodwin; Shondrae Crawford	Bangladesh	4:33
3.	"Straight Cadillac Pimpin'" (featuring Shannon Jones)	Smith; Goodwin; Shannon Jones; J. Knight	Davour; Vanex	4:59
4.	"We Do It"	Smith; Goodwin; Nashiem Myrick	Nashiem Myrick	5:09
5.	"The Streets" (featuring Bun B)	Smith; Goodwin; Sean Williams	The Wunda Twinz	4:15
6.	"Mad Rapper (Interlude)"	Smith; Deric Angelettie; Conrad Dimanche	Deric "D-Dot" Angelettie	1:16
7.	"Shot Off" (featuring Ludacris)	Christopher Bridges; Christopher Drumwright; William Frank Wright	Davour; Vanex; Stevie J (co.)	5:20
8.	"When It's On" (featuring P. Diddy)	Smith; Goodwin; Jeremy Graham	Yogi "Sugar Bear" Graham	5:06
9.	"Trying to Get at You" (featuring 112)	Smith; Goodwin; Bridges; Adonis Shropshire; Donald DeGrate	Gorilla Tek	4:18
10.	"Baby Girl" (featuring P. Diddy)	Smith; Goodwin; Graham	Yogi "Sugar Bear" Graham; Stevie J (co.)	4:17
11.	"Get a Kit (Interlude)"	John Dean; Walker	Anthony "Scoe" Walker	1:47
12.	"Forever" (featuring Lloyd)	Smith; Goodwin; Lloyd Polite	Bangladesh	5:00
13.	"Look at the Grillz" (featuring T.I. and Twista)	Smith; Goodwin; Clifford Harris; Carl Mitchell; Jonathan Smith	Lil' Jon	5:20
14.	"Living Legends (Interlude)"	Crawford	Bangladesh	1:09
15.	"Don't Make"	Smith; Goodwin; Crawford	Bangladesh	5:24
16.	"Memphis City Blues"	Smith; Goodwin; Andy Thelusma	Red Spyda	4:48
17.	"Gangsta"	Smith; Goodwin; Angelettie; Dave Orgin; Jonathan Robinson	Deric "D-Dot" Angelettie; Pop-Trax	3:41
18.	"Confessions" (featuring Poo Bear)	Smith; Goodwin; Jason Boyd; Marcello Valenzano; Andre Lyon; Barry Gibb; Maurice Gibb; Robin Gibb	Cool & Dre	4:33
Total length:				1:12:09

Sample credits

- Track 1 contains samples from "West Across the Ocean Sea" written by Vangelis.
- Track 9 contains interpolations from the composition "Come and Talk to Me" written by Donald DeGrate.
- Track 17 contains samples from the composition "Fresh" written by Dave Orgin and Jonathan Robinson.
- Track 18 contains interpolations from the composition "Reaching Out" written by Barry Gibb, Maurice Gibb and Robin Gibb.

== Personnel ==
- Premro "8Ball" Smith — vocals
- Marlon "MJG" Goodwin — vocals
- Shannon Jones — vocals (track 3)
- Bernard "Bun B" Freeman — vocals (track 5)
- Christopher "Ludacris" Bridges — vocals (track 7)
- Sean "P. Diddy" Combs — vocals (tracks: 8, 10), executive producer
- 112 — vocals (track 9)
- Lloyd Polite — vocals (track 12)
- Clifford "T.I." Harris — vocals (track 13)
- Carl "Twista" Mitchell — vocals (track 13)
- Jason "Poo Bear" Boyd — vocals (track 18)
- Anthony "Scoe" Walker — producer (tracks: 1, 11), recording (track 11)
- Shondrae "Bangladesh" Crawford — producer (tracks: 2, 12, 14, 15), recording (tracks: 1, 12, 14), mixing (tracks: 1, 14)
- Davour — producer (tracks: 3, 7)
- Vanex — producer (tracks: 3, 7)
- Nashiem Myrick — producer (track 4)
- The Wunda Twinz — producer (track 5)
- Deric "D-Dot" Angelettie — producer (tracks: 6, 17)
- Jeremy "Yogi Bear" Graham — producer (tracks: 8, 10)
- Tony "Gorilla Tek" Castillo — producer (track 9)
- Jonathan "Lil' Jon" Smith — producer (track 13)
- Andy "Red Spyda" Thelusma — producer (track 16)
- Pop Traxx — producer (track 17)
- Marcello "Cool" Valenzano — producer (track 18)
- Andre "Dre" Lyon — producer (track 18)
- Steven "Stevie J." Jordan — co-producer (tracks: 7, 10)
- Ariel Borujow — recording (tracks: 2, 8, 15, 17)
- Elizabeth Collins — recording (tracks: 3, 8, 9)
- Shannon "Slam" Lawrence — recording (tracks: 3, 15, 16)
- Alexis Seton — recording (tracks: 3, 16)
- Stephen Dent — recording (track 4)
- Bernowksi Wall — recording (tracks: 5, 10)
- Frankie Harley Jr. — recording (tracks: 6, 17)
- Nikolas Marzouca — recording (tracks: 7, 18)
- Dale Ramsey — recording (track 7)
- Steve Nowa — recording (track 9)
- Mark Vinten — recording (track 13)
- Steve Pageot — recording (track 17)
- Ed Raso — mixing (tracks: 6, 11)
- Rich Keller — mixing (tracks: 2–5, 7–10, 14–18)
- John Frye — mixing (track 12)
- Ray Seay — mixing (track 13)
- Chris Athens — mastering
- Conrad Dimanche — associate executive producer, A&R
- Harve "Joe Hooker" Pierre — associate executive producer
- Abbey Katz — art direction
- Scott Sandler — logo design
- Jonathan Mannion — photography

== Charts ==
=== Weekly charts ===
Chart (2004)	Peak position
US Billboard 200	3
US Top R&B/Hip-Hop Albums (Billboard)	1
US Top Rap Albums (Billboard)	1

=== Year-end charts ===
Chart (2004)	Position
US Billboard 200	144
US Top R&B/Hip-Hop Albums (Billboard)	25

== Certifications ==
Region	Certification	Certified units/sales
United States (RIAA)	Gold	500,000^{^}
^{^} Shipments figures based on certification alone.

== See also ==
- List of Billboard number-one R&B/hip-hop albums of 2004
