= On Top of the World (album) =

Studio album by Eightball & MJG
- Released: October 31, 1995
- Recorded: 1994–1995
- Studio: Digital Services (Houston, Texas)
- Genre: Hip hop
- Length: 70:51
- Labels: Suave House; Relativity
- Producer: T-Mix

Eightball & MJG chronology
On the Outside Looking In (1994)	On Top of the World (1995)	Lyrics of a Pimp (1997)

Professional ratings
Review scores
Source	Rating
AllMusic	3.5/5 stars
RapReviews	7/10
The Source	3.5/5 stars

On Top of the World is the third studio album by American hip hop duo Eightball & MJG. The album was released on October 31, 1995, by Suave House Records and Relativity Records. West-coast artists E-40 and Mac Mall both make appearances on this album, along with Big Mike – a one-time member of Geto Boys. Nuckle Heads, a newly formed group of 2 female rappers on Suave House, debut on this album. South Circle (Mr. Mike and Thorough) also make an appearance here. Former 1 of the Girls member Nina Creque also appears on the album.

The album cover was designed by Houston based company Pen & Pixel Graphics, who also designed the cover for their 1993 debut Comin' Out Hard. The company would later be known for their covers for No Limit Records as well as Cash Money Records.

== Track listing ==
All tracks are produced by T-Mix

No.	Title	Length
1.	"Intro"	1:45
2.	"Pimp in My Own Rhyme"	4:33
3.	"What Can I Do"	5:13
4.	"For Real"	5:30
5.	"Funk Mission"	5:11
6.	"Kick That Shit"	5:37
7.	"Friend or Foe" (featuring E-40, Mac Mall, Big Mike & Rodney Ellis)	6:23
8.	"Hand of the Devil"	4:58
9.	"Top of the World"	4:25
10.	"What Do You See" (featuring Nuckleheadz)	4:58
11.	"In the Line of Duty"	5:50
12.	"All in My Mind" (featuring South Circle)	5:05
13.	"Comin' Up"	4:16
14.	"Space Age Pimpin'" (featuring Nina Creque)	5:10
15.	"Break'em Off"	4:37

== Personnel ==
- DJ Squeeky - scratches
- Tony Draper - executive producer, production coordinator
- Roger Tausz - recording engineer, mixing
- John Moran - mastering
- Pen & Pixel - artwork, design, layout, special effects

== Charts ==
=== Weekly charts ===
Chart (1995)	Peak position
US Billboard 200	8
US Top R&B/Hip-Hop Albums (Billboard)	2

=== Year-end charts ===
Chart (1995)	Position
US Top R&B/Hip-Hop Albums (Billboard)	80
Chart (1996)	Position
US Top R&B/Hip-Hop Albums (Billboard)	46

== Certifications ==
Region	Certification	Certified units/sales
United States (RIAA)	Gold	500,000^{^}
^{^} Shipments figures based on certification alone.
