= On the Outside Looking In (album) =

Studio album by Eightball & MJG
- Released: May 24, 1994
- Recorded: 1993–94
- Genre: Hip hop
- Length: 53:26
- Label: Suave House; Relativity
- Producer: South O; Eightball & MJG

Eightball & MJG chronology
Comin' Out Hard (1993)	On the Outside Looking In (1994)	On Top of the World (1995)

Professional ratings
Review scores
Source	Rating
AllMusic	2.5/5 stars
RapReviews	7.5/10

On the Outside Looking In is the second studio album by American hip hop duo Eightball & MJG. The album released on September 27, 1994, by Suave House Records and Relativity Records.

== Track listing ==
No.	Title	Length
1.	"Long Distance (Intro)"	1:13
2.	"Lick 'Em Up Shot" (featuring Papa Reu)	5:13
3.	"Crumbz 2 Brixx"	4:51
4.	"Players Night Out"	4:28
5.	"Sesshead Funk Junky" (featuring MC Breed)	4:36
6.	"So What U Sayin'"	5:21
7.	"No Sellout"	5:00
8.	"Anotha Day in tha Hood"	5:05
9.	"No Mercy"	3:15
10.	"On tha Outside Lookin' In"	2:32
11.	"Break-a-Bitch College"	6:24
12.	"Lay It Down" (featuring Thorough and Crime Boss)	5:21
Total length:		53:26

== Charts ==
Chart (1994)	Peak position
US Billboard 200	106
US Top R&B/Hip-Hop Albums (Billboard)	11
