= Comin' Out Hard =

Studio album by Eightball & MJG
- Released: August 1993
- Recorded: 1992–93
- Genre: Southern hip-hop
- Length: 41:21
- Label: Suave House
- Producer: Tony Draper

Eightball & MJG chronology
Listen to the Lyrics (1992)	Comin' Out Hard (1993)	On the Outside Looking In (1994)

Comin' Out Hard is the debut studio album by American hip-hop duo Eightball & MJG, released in August 1993 by Suave House Records. It has sold more than 500,000 copies.

== Critical reception ==
Professional ratings
Review scores
Source	Rating
AllMusic	3/5 stars

In 2006, Spin included Comin' Out Hard on its list of "definitive" Southern Rap albums.

== Track listing ==
No.	Title	Length
1.	"Intro"	1:52
2.	"9 Little Millimeta Boys"	5:17
3.	"The First Episode"	5:10
4.	"Armed Robbery"	4:42
5.	"Pimps"	6:41
6.	"Comin' Out Hard"	4:30
7.	"Mr. Big (Eightball solo)"	5:53
8.	"Nigga's Like Us"	4:46
9.	"Pimps in the House (MJG solo)"	3:18

== Personnel ==
- Tony Draper – executive producer
- Eightball – vocals
- James Endsley – executive producer
- Fresh – engineer, mastering, mixing
- MJG – vocals
- Kid Style – design
- T-Money – engineer, mastering, mixing
- Bruce "Grim" Rhodes – DJ
- Pen & Pixel – cover art

== Charts ==
Chart (1993–1994)	Peak position
US Top R&B/Hip-Hop Albums (Billboard)	40
