= Ridin High (8Ball & MJG album) =

Studio album by 8Ball & MJG
- Released: March 13, 2007
- Recorded: 2006–2007
- Genre: Southern hip-hop
- Length: 60:14
- Label: Bad Boy South; Atlantic
- Producer: P. Diddy (also exec.); Mario Winans; Jazze Pha; Drum Majors; DJ Toomp; Midnight Black; Bangladesh; Danja; B-Rock; DJ Nasty & LVM; Shawty Redd; Soul Diggaz; Gorilla Zoe; Bigg D; C.K.P.; Gorilla Tek

8Ball & MJG chronology
| Living Legends (2004) | Ridin High (2007) | Ten Toes Down (2010) |

Singles from Ridin High
- 1. "Ridin High" Released: 2006; 2. "Clap On" Released: 2007

Professional ratings
Review scores
| Source | Rating |
|---|---|
| AllHipHop | 3.5/5 stars |
| AllMusic | 3/5 stars |
| Entertainment Weekly | B− |
| HipHopDX | 2.5/5 stars |
| RapReviews | 7.5/10 |
| Stylus Magazine | C |
| Vibe | 3.5/5 stars |
| XXL | 4/5 stars |

Ridin High is the seventh studio album by the American hip hop duo 8Ball & MJG. The album was released on March 13, 2007, by Bad Boy South and Atlantic Records. It was originally scheduled for July 2006, under the title Pure American Pimpin', but was eventually confirmed to be titled Ridin High. The album features guest appearances from Three 6 Mafia, Juvenile, Yung Joc, P Diddy, the Notorious B.I.G., Jazze Pha, 112, and Project Pat. It was produced by Jazze Pha, Sean Dre, Drumma Boy, Lil Jon, DJ Toomp, and Danja.

The first single off the album is "Relax and Take Notes", which features the Notorious B.I.G. (containing elements of "Dead Wrong" from his posthumous album Born Again) and Project Pat. The second single of the album is called "Cruzin'". Following its release, the album debuted at number eight on the U.S. Billboard 200, selling 50,000 copies in its first week.

== Track listing ==
| No. | Title | Producer(s) | Length |
|---|---|---|---|
| 1. | "Intro" (P Diddy) | Danja | 0:48 |
| 2. | "Relax and Take Notes" (featuring The Notorious B.I.G. and Project Pat) | DJ Nasty & LVM | 4:51 |
| 3. | "Ridin High" (featuring P. Diddy) | Bigg D | 4:18 |
| 4. | "Turn Up the Bump" | Danja | 4:29 |
| 5. | "Cruzin" (featuring Three 6 Mafia and Slim of 112) | Midnight Black | 5:20 |
| 6. | "Whatchu Gonna Do" (featuring Pimp C) | Midnight Black | 4:50 |
| 7. | "30 Rocks" (featuring P Diddy) | Soul Diggaz | 4:23 |
| 8. | "Blow Job (Interlude)" (featuring P. Diddy) | | 1:33 |
| 9. | "Hickory Dickory Dock" | Shawty Redd | 4:53 |
| 10. | "Runnin Out of Bud" (featuring Killer Mike) | Gorilla Tek | 5:13 |
| 11. | "Clap On" (featuring Yung Joc) | Gorilla Zoe | 3:50 |
| 12. | "Alcohol Pussy Weed /Skit" | P Diddy; Mario Winans | 3:37 |
| 13. | "Pimpin (Interlude)" | Conrad "Rad" Dimanche; Kenan Thompson | 0:30 |
| 14. | "Pimpin' Don't Fail Me Now" (featuring Jazze Pha and Juvenile) | Jazze Pha | 3:57 |
| 15. | "Worldwide" | Toomp | 4:26 |
| 16. | "Take it Off" (featuring Poo Bear) | Midnight Black | 5:22 |
| 17. | "Memphis" (featuring Al Kapone) | B-Rock | 3:59 |
| 18. | "Get Low" | Bangladesh | 4:00 |
| 19. | "Stand Up" | CKP | 4:21 |

== Credits ==
- Executive producer: P Diddy
- Co-executive producer: Harve Pierre
- Associate executive producer: Conrad "Rad" Dimanche
- A&R: Dimanche and Dewayne "Big Du" Martin
- Project manager: Gwendolyn Niles
- Creative direction and design: Abbey Katz
- Photography: Naoto Akeda
- Background photos: Katz
- Associate design: Marsha Porter
- Styling: Shanieke Peru

== Charts ==
=== Weekly charts ===
| Chart (2007) | Peak position |
|---|---|
| US Billboard 200 | 8 |
| US Top R&B/Hip-Hop Albums (Billboard) | 4 |

=== Year-end charts ===
| Chart (2007) | Position |
|---|---|
| US Top R&B/Hip-Hop Albums (Billboard) | 73 |
