= This Might Be the Day =

Studio album by MJG
- Released: July 15, 2008
- Recorded: 2008
- Genre: Hip hop
- Length: 51:36
- Label: 404 Music, MJG Muzik
- Producer: MJG, TMack

MJG chronology
Pimp Tight (2008)	This Might Be the Day (2008)

This Might Be the Day is the third studio album by American rapper MJG. It was released on July 15, 2008, by 404 Music and MJG Muzik.

== Track listing ==
No.	Title	Producer(s)	Length
1.	"This Might Be the Day"	TMack	2:11
2.	"Shades"	TMack	3:57
3.	"Breathe"	TMack	4:07
4.	"Can't Get Rid of Me"	TMack	4:12
5.	"Busted"	TMack	1:10
6.	"What Would You Do" (featuring 8Ball)	TMack	4:22
7.	"Mack Life" (featuring TMack)	TMack	3:28
8.	"Jungle" (featuring GC)	MJG	5:30
9.	"Roll Wit Me"	TMack	4:11
10.	"Gangsta Gangsta" (featuring Alfamega)	TMack	4:23
11.	"Dangerous" (featuring Gucci Mane & 8Ball)	MJG	5:10
12.	"Big Time" (featuring Slim)	TMack	4:15
13.	"It's Been So Long" (featuring 8Ball)	MJG	4:39

== Charts ==
Chart (2008)	Peak position
US Top R&B/Hip-Hop Albums (Billboard)	45
