= Clifton James (musician) =

American drummer

- Born: October 2, 1936; Chicago, U.S.
- Died: February 16, 2006 (aged 69) Chicago, U.S.
- Genres: R&B
- Instrument: Drums
- Years active: c. 1950–1970s
- Labels: Chess

Clifton James (October 2, 1936 – February 16, 2006) was an American drummer who was most closely associated with Bo Diddley, and played on many R&B records issued by Chess Records between 1955 and 1970.

== Biography ==
Born in Chicago, one of a family of fourteen, James began playing drums as a child, and in his teens played in the bands backing Memphis Slim and Elmore James. He met Bo Diddley in 1953, and became a member of Bo Diddley's band alongside maracas player Jerome Green and bassist Roosevelt Jackson.

Bo Diddley said that when he added Clifton James to his band, "He was the man who did the original Bo Diddley beat on the drums." Clifton James himself said: "I'm the one that gave him that beat... It just came to me. Well, before I started messing around with him, I was at home and I was just beating out something. That's all. I met Bo and we started playing together... " Willie Dixon also said: "That actually was Clifton James' idea of a beat more than it was Bo Diddley's."

James played on the song "Bo Diddley", which reached number 2 on the R&B chart in 1955, and then played on most of Bo Diddley's later recordings through the 1950s and 1960s. On the 1956 track "Who Do You Love", it was James who suggested the line "..use a cobra snake for a necktie..".

He also toured with Bo Diddley, intermittently replacing Frank Kirkland, and toured and recorded with other Chess musicians including Willie Dixon, Muddy Waters, Sonny Boy Williamson, Howlin' Wolf, Koko Taylor and Buddy Guy. Under Dixon's direction, James became a member of the Chicago Blues All Stars, who toured widely in Europe and North America from the late 1960s on. Other band members included Sunnyland Slim, Big Walter Horton, and Johnny Shines. James was also an occasional vocalist, and led his own band on a tour of Holland in the 1970s.

By the 1980s, he worked at a rubber factory, and had largely given up playing music. He died in Chicago in 2006, aged 69.

in 2016, Rolling Stone listed James as number 30 in their list of the "100 Greatest Drummers of All Time".
