= Space Age 4 Eva =

Studio album by 8Ball & MJG
- Released: November 21, 2000
- Recorded: 1999–2000
- Genre: Hip hop
- Length: 60:04
- Label: JCOR; Interscope
- Producer: Corey "Blacstract" Woodard, MJG, Swizz Beatz, Jazze Pha, DJ Quik

8Ball & MJG chronology
Memphis Under World (2000)	Space Age 4 Eva (2000)	Living Legends (2004)

Singles from Space Age 4 Eva
- 1. "Pimp Hard" Released: 2000; 2. "Buck Bounce" Released: 2001

Professional ratings
Review scores
Source	Rating
AllMusic	3/5 stars
HipHopDX	2.5/5 stars
RapReviews	8.5/10
Rolling Stone	4/5 stars

Space Age 4 Eva is the fifth studio album by American hip hop duo 8Ball & MJG. The album released on November 21, 2000, by JCOR Entertainment and Interscope Records. The music video for the album's first single "Pimp Hard" marked the directorial debut of photographer Anthony Mandler.

== Track listing ==
No.	Title	Producer(s)	Length
1.	"Intro"	MJG	3:44
2.	"I Know U"	Corey "Blackstract" Woodard	4:50
3.	"Thingz" (featuring Tiny of Xscape and Jazze Pha)	Jazze Pha	5:01
4.	"Collard Greens"	MJG	3:43
5.	"Pimp Shit" (featuring Thorough of South Circle)	Woodard	4:02
6.	"Buck Bounce" (featuring DJ Quik)	DJ Quik	4:36
7.	"Space Age 4 Eva" (featuring Peachee P)	MJG	4:32
8.	"Pimp Hard"	Jazze Pha	5:05
9.	"Boom Boom" (featuring Swizz Beatz)	Swizz Beatz	5:06
10.	"Alwayz"	MJG	4:23
11.	"At Tha Club"	Jazze Pha	5:06
12.	"Jankie"	DJ Quik	4:23
13.	"It's All Real" (featuring Billy Cook)	Woodard	4:51
14.	"Thank God"	Swizz Beatz	4:40

== Charts ==
Chart (2000)	Peak position
US Billboard 200	39
US Top R&B/Hip-Hop Albums (Billboard)	9
