= Almost Famous (8Ball album) =

Studio album by 8Ball
- Released: November 20, 2001
- Recorded: 2000–01
- Genre: Hip hop
- Length: 1:10:12
- Label: JCOR Entertainment
- Producers: 8Ball (also exec.); Corey 'Blacstract' Woodard; Corline 6000; Dewayne Martin; Nitti; Oomp Camp

8Ball chronology
Lost (1998)	Almost Famous (2001)	Lay It Down (2002)

Professional ratings
Review scores
Source	Rating
AllMusic	3/5 stars
HipHopDX	3.5/5
RapReviews	8/10
The Source	3.5/5 stars

Almost Famous is the second solo studio album by American rapper 8Ball. It was released on November 20, 2001, through JCOR Entertainment. It features guest appearances from MJG, Carl Thomas, Cl'Che, Dorasel, Koncrete, Ludacris, P. Diddy and Thorough. The album peaked at number 47 on the Billboard 200 and number 6 on the Top R&B/Hip-Hop Albums in the United States.

== Track listing ==
No.	Title	Producer(s)	Length
1.	"Thorn"	Nitti	5:34
2.	"Spit"	Corey 'Blacstract' Woodard	4:19
3.	"No Sellout" (featuring Koncrete)	Nitti	4:33
4.	"Holla Back" (featuring Carl Thomas)	Nitti	4:50
5.	"Live This"	Corey 'Blacstract' Woodard	4:11
6.	"Daddy" (featuring MJG)	Corline 6000; Dewayne Martin	5:00
7.	"4U" (featuring Cl'che)	Nitti	4:42
8.	"Slab Rider"	Corline 6000; Dewayne Martin	5:40
9.	"Stop Playin' Games" (featuring P. Diddy)	Nitti	4:24
10.	"Do You Really" (featuring MJG)	Nitti	4:37
11.	"2Nite (Don't Do It)" (featuring Koncrete)	8Ball	4:40
12.	"Witcha Lookin' Ass" (featuring Ludacris)	Nitti	4:15
13.	"Stripes"	Oomp Camp	3:39
14.	"Like Dat"	Corey 'Blacstract' Woodard	4:51
15.	"Don't Forget" (featuring Dorasel and Thorough)	Corey 'Blacstract' Woodard	4:57
Total length:			1:10:12

== Charts ==
=== Weekly charts ===
Chart (2001)	Peak position
US Billboard 200	47
US Top R&B/Hip-Hop Albums (Billboard)	6

=== Year-end charts ===
Chart (2002)	Position
US Top R&B/Hip-Hop Albums (Billboard)	67
