= No More Glory =

Studio album by MJG
- Released: November 18, 1997
- Recorded: 1996–1997
- Studio: Urban House (Houston, TX)
- Genre: Hip-hop
- Length: 1:06:37
- Label: Suave House; Universal
- Producer: Mo-Suave-A Productions, Inc.

MJG chronology
On Top of the World (1995)	No More Glory (1997)	In Our Lifetime (1999)

Professional ratings
Review scores
Source	Rating
AllMusic	4/5 stars
RapReviews	8/10
(The New) Rolling Stone Album Guide	3.5/5 stars
The Source	3.5/5 stars

No More Glory is the debut solo studio album by American rapper MJG. The album was released on November 18, 1997, via Suave House/Universal Records. The recording sessions took place at Urban House Studios in Houston. The album was produced by Mo-Suave-A Productions Inc. It features guest appearances from 8Ball, Bun B, Rodney Ellis, and the Fedz.

In the United States, the album peaked at number 20 on the Billboard 200 and number 4 on the Top R&B/Hip-Hop Albums charts. It received a Gold certification by the Recording Industry Association of America on March 6, 1998, for the sales of 500,000 copies in the US alone.

MJG had already released three albums as a part of the group 8Ball & MJG, but following 1995's On Top of the World, the two rappers decided to each release a solo album before continuing as a group. This was the first solo released from the group, 8Ball would release his solo debut, Lost, in 1998. The album's title is a reference to the confederate flag and its nickname "Glory".

== Track listing ==
No.	Title	Length
1.	"Keep Your Mind"	5:21
2.	"Hip Hop Voodoo"	4:31
3.	"10th Grade (Skit)"	0:17
4.	"Good Damm Man"	5:45
5.	"Shine and Recline" (featuring Eightball)	3:54
6.	"That Girl" (featuring Rodney Ellis)	4:37
7.	"Slippin'"	3:25
8.	"Take No Shit" (featuring the Fedz and Bun B)	4:56
9.	"Pimpin' Ain't Easy"	3:07
10.	"Black Mac Is Black" (featuring Eightball)	4:11
11.	"No More Glory"	3:56
12.	"What Is This?"	5:32
13.	"Questions (Skit)"	1:07
14.	"Don't Hold Back"	4:03
15.	"Reflections"	1:31
16.	"Hard But Fair"	5:19
17.	"Middle of the Night" (featuring Eightball)	5:05
Total length:		1:06:37

== Charts ==
=== Weekly charts ===
Chart performance for No More Glory
Chart (1997)	Peak position
US Billboard 200	20
US Top R&B/Hip-Hop Albums (Billboard)	4

=== Year-end charts ===
Year-end chart performance for No More Glory
Chart (1998)	Position
US Top R&B Albums (Billboard)	82

== Certifications ==
Region	Certification	Certified units/sales
United States (RIAA)	Gold	500,000^{^}
^{^} Shipments figures based on certification alone.
