= Mr. Mike =

American rapper (born 1970)

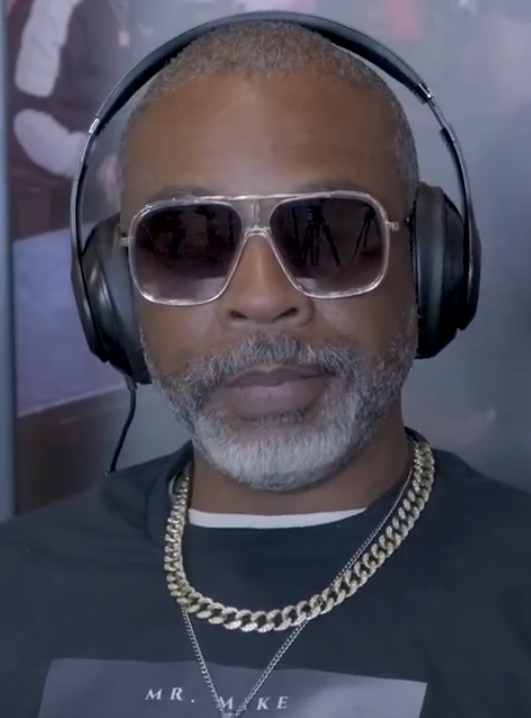
- Mr. Mike in 2023

Background information
- Born: Mike Walls; December 10, 1970 (age 55)
- Origin: Corpus Christi, Texas, U.S.
- Genres: Hip hop
- Occupation: Rapper
- Years active: 1987–present
- Labels: Suave House; Priority
- Formerly of: South Circle

Mike Walls (born December 10, 1970), better known as Mr. Mike, is an American rapper.

== Career ==
1987–1995

Mr. Mike began his career started with Suave House Records, as half of South Circle, with Thorough. The duo released their debut album, Anotha Day Anotha Balla, in the summer of 1995. It became a minor success on the Billboard charts, but the duo disbanded shortly after its release. After South Circle, Mr. Mike embarked on a solo career.

1996–2002

His debut album, Wicked Wayz, debuted in the top 40 on the U.S. charts, peaking at 29 on the Billboard 200 in the summer of 1996. Despite the album's success, Mr. Mike left Suave House and joined Priority Records, where he released his second album, 1999's Rhapsody. The album failed to match the success of Wicked Wayz, only making it to 172 on the Billboard 200, and Mike was dropped from Priority.

2003–2012

In 2003, he presented and featured on the album Rude and The Gulf Coast Wise Guys - Hard Life, Hard Times. That same year, Mr. Mike released an independent album entitled Piping Hot, featuring Bun B, MJG, JT Money and Big Gipp but he has been rarely heard from since. He featured on Hilda Lamas song "Green Eyes" in 2006, and Point Blank's album Ganxstaz Only in 2012.

== Discography ==
=== Studio albums ===
Title	Release	Peak chart positions	
Title	Release	US	US R&B
Wicked Wayz	Released: July 30, 1996; Label: Suave House	29	5
Rhapsody	Released: September 7, 1999; Label: Priority	172	36
Piping Hot	Released: October 14, 2003; Label: Yes Yes Y'all	—	—
In My Own Lane	Released: October 5, 2015; Label: Grind Game	—	—
Thug Prophecy	Released: February 18, 2016; Label: Grind Game	—	—

=== Collaboration albums ===
- Anotha Day Anotha Balla with South Circle (1995)

=== Compilation albums ===
- From da Hood to da Barrio (2003)
- Mr. Mike Presents "Grind Game" (2014)

=== Mixtapes ===
- Redemption (2009)
