= The Vet & the Rookie =

The Vet & The Rookie

Studio album by 8Ball and Devius
- Released: October 9, 2007
- Recorded: 2007
- Genre: Hip hop
- Length: 53:17
- Label: 8 Ways Entertainment, Koch Records, RBC Records

8Ball chronology
Light Up the Bomb (2006)	The Vet & The Rookie (2007)	Doin' It Big (2008)

Devius chronology
The Vet & The Rookie (2007)

The Vet & The Rookie is a collaborative studio album by American rappers 8Ball and Devius. The album was released on October 9, 2007, by 8 Ways Entertainment, Koch Records and RBC Records.

== Track listing ==
No.	Title	Length
1.	"Pass the Rock"	3:33
2.	"Street Dreams"	3:27
3.	"Err Body Kno Me"	4:12
4.	"Get' Em Up" (featuring Avante)	4:37
5.	"Jus Ridin'"	5:14
6.	"Boom Baboom"	4:16
7.	"Ice Cream"	4:11
8.	"Beat the Brakes"	4:21
9.	"Never Fold"	4:47
10.	"Money Machine"	4:11
11.	"Hustle Hard"	4:17
12.	"M-Gang Da Shit"	2:41
13.	"Promise"	3:30

== Charts ==
Chart (2007)	Peak position
US Top R&B/Hip-Hop Albums (Billboard)	31
US Independent Albums (Billboard)	35
