= Doin' It Big =

Studio album by 8Ball & E.D.I.
- Released: April 1, 2008
- Recorded: 2007–2008
- Genre: Hip hop
- Length: 46:03
- Label: Real Talk Entertainment Koch
- Producer: Derrick "Sac" Johnson, Big Hollis, Vince V.

8Ball chronology
The Vet & The Rookie (2007)	Doin' It Big (2008)	Life's Quest (2012)

E.D.I. chronology
Against All Oddz (2006)	Doin' It Big (2008)	The Stash Spot (2010)

Doin' It Big is the collaborative studio album by American rappers 8Ball and E.D.I. The album was released on April 1, 2008, by Real Talk Entertainment.

== Track listing ==
No.	Title	Length
1.	"The Business"	0:59
2.	"Fuck Niggas"	4:41
3.	"It's Music"	3:56
4.	"Super Bowl Big"	3:49
5.	"Celebrate"	4:21
6.	"Blow It Out"	4:41
7.	"Real Down Bitch"	4:16
8.	"Don't Stop"	3:35
9.	"All I Need"	0:11
10.	"Real Quick"	4:17
11.	"Greed"	0:41
12.	"Puttin' in Work" (featuring MJG)	4:33
13.	"Ain't Gotta Tell Ya"	5:01
14.	"At Last"	3:28

collector's edition bonus tracks
No.	Title	Length
15.	"All Ready"	0:53
16.	"Get Yo Ass Up"	4:32

== Charts ==
Chart (2006)	Peak position
US Top R&B/Hip-Hop Albums (Billboard)	30
US Independent Albums (Billboard)	38
