= In Our Lifetime (Eightball & MJG album) =

Studio album by Eightball & M.J.G.
- Released: May 18, 1999
- Recorded: 1998–1999
- Studios: Urban House Studios, Inc. (Houston, TX); The Dungeon Recording Studios (Atlanta, GA); Digital Services (Houston, TX)
- Genre: Hip hop
- Length: 1:01:53
- Labels: Suave House; Universal
- Producers: Mr. DJ; T-Mix

Eightball & M.J.G. chronology
Lyrics of a Pimp (1997)	In Our Lifetime (1999)	Memphis Under World (2000)

In Our Lifetime is the fourth studio album by American hip hop duo Eightball & MJG. It was released on May 18, 1999, through Suave House Records under a new distribution deal with Universal Records. The recording sessions took place at Urban House Studios, Inc. and Digital Services in Houston and at the Dungeon Recording Studios in SWATS. The album was produced by T-Mix and Mr. DJ, with Tony Draper serving as executive producer. It features guest appearances from Big Duke, Thorough, CeeLo Green, Nina Creque, Outkast, and Toni Hickman. The album debuted at number 10 on the Billboard 200 and topped the Top R&B Albums charts, selling 95,000 copies in its first week in the United States. A music video was made for "We Started This". The album would be the duo's last recording for the Suave House Records label.

== Critical reception ==
Professional ratings
Review scores
Source	Rating
AllMusic	4.5/5 stars
Los Angeles Times	3.5/4 stars
Rolling Stone	3.5/5 stars
The Source	4/5 stars
USA Today	3/4 stars

In Our Lifetime received critical acclaim from music critics. Stephen Thomas Erlewine of AllMusic called the album "an appealing variation on the Dirty South sound" and thought it was the duo's best album to date. Soren Baker, in his review for Los Angeles Times, called In Our Lifetime "another stunning collection" which is "[m]ore musically subdued than their solo releases". He complimented its "dramatic sonic atmosphere" and the use of live instrumentation rather than samples, while also praising the duo for their "precision rhymes" and a variety of topics they discuss on the album. Kris Ex of Rolling Stone also noted the album's wide range of topics, while also highlighting "a sincerity absent from most hip-hop discs". Talking about the instrumentals, the journalist described them as "thick-battered bass grooves, molasses-like instrumentation and even jazz and rock guitars". The Source's Miguel Burke called the album "surreal, airy, futuristic funk over tales of hard times and easy women", praising its "mind-blowing production". Steve Jones of USA Today wrote that the duo's "edgy street rhymes are gritty and grooving".

== Track listing ==
No.	Title	Writer(s)	Producer(s)	Length
1.	"Intro"	Premro Smith; Triston Jones	T-Mix	3:08
2.	"We Started This"	Smith; Marlon Goodwin; Jones	T-Mix	4:05
3.	"Paid Dues" (featuring Cee-Lo)	Smith; Goodwin; Thomas Callaway; David Sheats	Mr. DJ	5:12
4.	"Do It How It Go"	Smith; Goodwin; Jones	T-Mix	3:54
5.	"Don't Flex"	Smith; Goodwin; Sheats	Mr. DJ	5:08
6.	"Belly" (featuring Big Duke)	Smith; Goodwin; Lee Dixon; Jones	T-Mix	4:51
7.	"Daylight"	Smith; Goodwin; Jones	T-Mix	4:45
8.	"We Don't Give a Fuck"	Smith; Goodwin; Sheats	Mr. DJ	4:09
9.	"Get It Crunk" (featuring Thorough)	Smith; Goodwin; Rex Robeson; Jones	T-Mix	4:03
10.	"Armed Robbery" (featuring Thorough, Gillie da Kid, Toni Hickman and Big Duke)	Far'd Nasir; Toni Hickman; Dixon; Jones	T-Mix	4:06
11.	"Love Hurts" (featuring Nina Creque)	Smith; Goodwin; Nina Creque; Jones	T-Mix	4:42
12.	"Nobody But Me"	Smith; Goodwin; Jones	T-Mix	4:58
13.	"Throw Your Hands Up" (featuring Outkast)	Smith; Goodwin; André Benjamin; Antwan Patton; Sheats	Mr. DJ	5:25
14.	"Speed"	Smith; Goodwin; Jones	T-Mix	3:27
Total length:				1:01:53

== Personnel ==
- Premro "Eightball" Smith – vocals
- Marlon "MJG" Goodwin – vocals, keyboards (track 3)
- Thomas "CeeLo Green" Callaway – vocals (track 3)
- Lee "Big Duke" Dixon – vocals (tracks: 6, 10)
- Rex "Thorough" Robeson – vocals (tracks: 9, 10)
- Far'd "Gillie da Kid" Nasir – vocals (track 10)
- Toni Hickman – vocals (track 10)
- Nina Creque – vocals (track 11)
- André Benjamin – vocals (track 13)
- Antwan "Big Boi" Patton – vocals (track 13)
- Preston Crump – bass (tracks: 3, 5, 8, 13)
- Eric Gales – guitar (track 6)
- Donny Mathis – guitar (track 8)
- Marvin "Chanz" Parkman – keyboards (track 8)
- Triston "T-Mix" Jones – producer & recording (tracks: 1, 2, 4, 6, 7, 9–12, 14)
- David "Mr. DJ" Sheats – producer & mixing (tracks: 3, 5, 8, 13)
- John "Bernasky" Wall – recording (tracks: 3, 5, 8, 13)
- James Hoover – mixing (tracks: 1, 2, 4, 6, 7, 9–12, 14)
- Simon "Crazy C" Cullins – mixing (tracks: 1, 2, 4, 6, 7, 9–12, 14)
- Josh Butler – mixing (tracks: 3, 5, 8, 13)
- Tony Dawsey – mastering
- Tony Draper – executive producer

== Charts ==
Chart (1999)	Peak position
US Billboard 200	10
US Top R&B Albums (Billboard)	1

== Certifications ==
Region	Certification	Certified units/sales
United States (RIAA)	Gold	500,000^{^}
^{^} Shipments figures based on certification alone.

== See also ==
- List of Billboard number-one R&B albums of 1999
