= Suave House Records =

American record label

- Founded: 1990
- Founder: Tony Draper
- Distributors: Suave House (U.S.); Entertainment One Distribution (outside U.S.)
- Genre: Southern hip hop; gangsta rap; R&B; dance
- Country of origin: United States
- Location: Houston, Texas

Suave House Records, also known as The Legendary Suave House, is a record label in Houston, Texas, United States, founded by Tony Draper.

== History ==
The label was founded in 1990 when Draper was sixteen years old. Landmark independent releases from flagship act 8Ball & MJG made the company a heavyweight in the South and the Midwest. When Suave House signed national deals with Relativity Records and later Universal Records, 8Ball & MJG's efforts hit gold and platinum, as did their solo efforts. Suave House's other artists – Tela, South Circle, Mr. Mike, and Crime Boss – all carved out their own musical niches with music that alternated between gritty and street smooth, each selling hundreds of thousands of copies in the process.

In 1997, Suave House switched distributors from Relativity to Universal Records. The label's first release under new distribution was MJG's solo debut No More Glory.

In 1999, after Suave House's distribution deal was up with Universal Records, the label signed a distribution deal with Artemis Records and release a compilation album titled Suave House Presents.. Off Da Chain Vol. 1 which featured artists Lil Noah, Gillie Da Kid, 8Ball & MJG, Chico DeBarge, Joe, Psychodrama, Toni Hickman, and Ab Liva.

In 2007, Suave House Records also released an album from Def Jam's recording artist Rick Ross titled Rise to Power. The album was composed of older songs from Ross during his time at Suave House. Some tracks were remixed and produced by current Suave House's producer Jiggolo.

In April 2008, Suave House signed a joint venture deal with Koch. The label's first release under the partnership was an 8Ball & MJG greatest hits album titled We Are the South.

== Suave House Records today ==
In a March 2006 interview with XXL, Suave House CEO Tony Draper was asked about the vision of Suave House, "Why do you think Suave House II can compete in this day and age?" Draper said,

"Because I believe that half of the niggas that you see out right now got their game from me. When Suave was doing their thing there was no Cash Money or No Limit. I respect what they've done. But a lot of niggas ain't real because they ain't paying respect. I knew the movement was big, my shit was solid. Because the only one thing that consumers know is that they love the product. They don't know that there is a nigga that's making them make songs like that. I was a family type nigga, we used to sit in the house making the shit from scratch. When the code was violated, that's when the music started changing."

== Current labels ==
- Royal Reign LLC
- Black Militia Entertainment

== Artists ==
- T-Mix
- Scrilla
- Prince Newman
- Amir Perry (Jiggolo)
- Corey Morris (musician)
- 8Ball

== Former artists ==
- 8Ball & MJG
- Tela
- Crime Boss
- Mr. Sche
- Big Mike
- Rick Ross
- Smooth Rhyme Criminals
- South Circle (Mr. Mike and Thorough)
- Mr. Mike
- Lil' Noah
- Gillie Da Kid
- The Fedz
- Jazze Pha
- Young Twan
- Psychodrama
- Nuckle Heads
- Ill Hill Billies
- Lux Cash
- Noah
- Omar The Czar
- One Gud Cide
- Baby S
- Big Duke
- Big Gee
- At-Large
- Foulmouf

== See also ==
- Lists of record labels
- No Limit Records
- Cash Money Records
- Pen & Pixel
