= 8Ball & MJG =

American hip hop duo

- Origin: Orange Mound, Memphis, Tennessee, U.S.
- Genres: Hip hop; Memphis hip hop
- Years active: 1989–present
- Labels: OTS; E1; Grand Hustle; Atlantic; Bad Boy South; Interscope; JCOR; Universal; Relativity; Suave House
- Members: Premro "8Ball" Smith; Marlon Jermaine "MJG" Goodwin

8Ball & MJG is an American hip hop duo from Orange Mound, Memphis, Tennessee. They met at Ridgeway Middle School in 1984. In 1993, the duo released their debut album Comin' Out Hard. They went on to release On the Outside Looking In (1994), On Top of the World (1995), In Our Lifetime (1999), Space Age 4 Eva (2000), Living Legends (2004), Ridin High (2007) and Ten Toes Down (2010).

== Career ==
In 1991, 8Ball & MJG released an underground 1991 album Listen to the Lyrics. In 1993, they released the more commercially-successful album Comin' Out Hard. Their subsequent albums in the 1990s, including 1994's On the Outside Looking In, and 1995's On Top of the World elevated them to becoming heralded Southern rappers. On Top of the World peaked at #8 on the Billboard 200 and was certified gold. I "Space Age Pimpin'" was their first single to chart, reaching #58 on the Hot R&B/Hip-Hop Singles & Tracks chart and #22 on the Hot Rap Singles chart. In the following years, both rappers released solo albums -- MJG's No More Glory in 1997, followed by 8Ball's Lost in 1998. They reunited in 1999 to release their fourth album as a group, titled In Our Lifetime. In 2000, they released Space Age 4 Eva, which was their fifth album.

In 1996, they appeared on the Red Hot Organization's compilation CD, America Is Dying Slowly, alongside Biz Markie, Wu-Tang Clan, Fat Joe and other prominent hip hop artists. The CD, meant to raise awareness of the AIDS epidemic among African American men, was heralded as "a masterpiece" by The Source. In the early 2000s, they signed with Sean Combs' Bad Boy Records. They already had some experience with the label, being featured on the song "The Player Way" from Bad Boy rapper Mase's 1997 album Harlem World. Their first album for Bad Boy Records, Living Legends, came out in 2004 and was certified gold by the Recording Industry Association of America. They released their next album, Ridin High in March 2007.

Commercially, a pinnacle moment in their career was rapping on Three 6 Mafia's song "Stay Fly", which rose to #13 on the Billboard Hot 100, which was the biggest hit for Three 6 Mafia or 8Ball & MJG, who were two of the most successful rap groups from Tennessee. Today, 8Ball and MJG also head their own record labels, 8 Ways Entertainment (distributed by Koch Entertainment) and MJG Muzik, respectively. The label included Da Volunteers, known for the 2006 single, "What's Yo Favorite Color?" about their neighborhood of Orange Mound.

In September 2007, 8Ball and MJG signed deals in Sacramento, California with Real Talk Entertainment. 8Ball released a group album with E.D.I. Mean of the Outlawz entitled Doin' It Big on April 1, 2008, and MJG released a solo album entitled Pimp Tight on April 29, 2008. In June 2008 they announced that they signed with T.I.'s record label, Grand Hustle. Their eighth album as a group and their first on Grand Hustle, titled Ten Toes Down, was released in May 2010. It reached #36 on the Billboard 200 in its first week.

== Discography ==
=== Studio albums ===
- Comin' Out Hard (1993)
- On the Outside Looking In (1994)
- On Top of the World (1995)
- Lyrics of a Pimp (1997)
- In Our Lifetime (1999)
- Space Age 4 Eva (2000)
- Living Legends (2004)
- Ridin High (2007)
- Ten Toes Down (2010)

=== 8Ball albums ===
- Lost (1998)
- Almost Famous (2001)
- Lay It Down (2002)
- Light Up the Bomb (2006)
- The Vet & The Rookie with Devius (2007)
- Doin' It Big with E.D.I. (2008)
- 8Ball & Memphis All-Stars: Cars, Clubs & Strip Clubs (2009)
- Life's Quest (2012)

=== MJG albums ===
- No More Glory (1997)
- Pimp Tight (2008)
- This Might Be the Day (2008)
- Too Pimpin' (2013)
- Too Pimpin' 2.0 (2014)
