= Devin the Dude =

American rapper (born 1969)

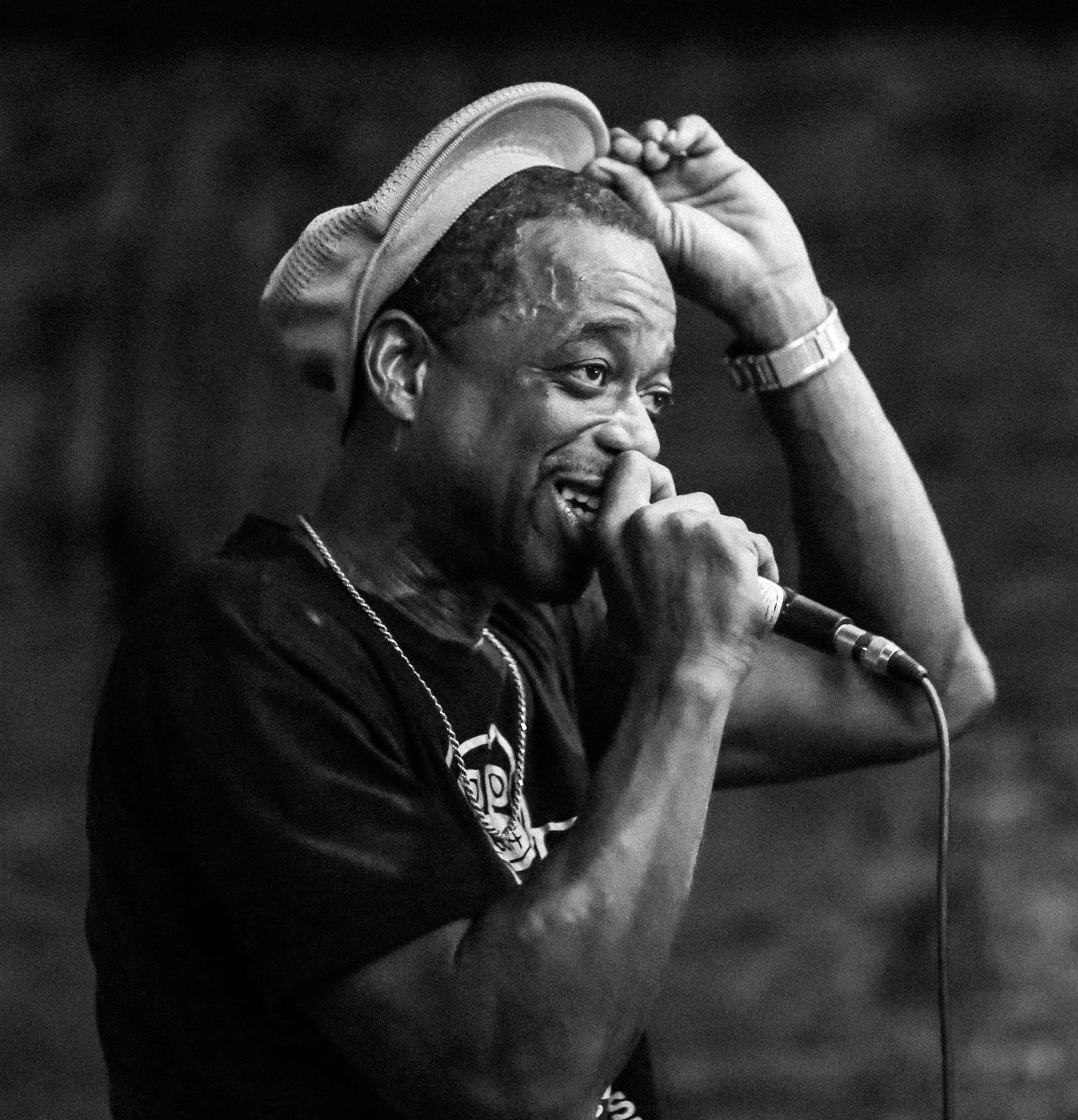
- Devin the Dude performing in 2024

Background information
- Born: Devin Copeland; June 4, 1969 (age 57); Pontiac, Michigan, U.S.
- Origin: Houston, Texas, U.S.
- Genre: Southern hip-hop
- Occupations: Rapper; songwriter; record producer
- Years active: 1989–present
- Labels: Coughee; Real Talk; E1; Razor & Tie; Asylum; Atlantic; Interscope; Rap-a-Lot
- Member of: Coughee Brothaz
- Formerly of: Facemob
- Website: devinthedude.com

Devin Charles Copeland (born June 4, 1969), better known by his stage name Devin the Dude, is an American rapper. In 2025, he co-created Coughee by Devin the Dude, a hemp and cannabis-culture brand.

== Early life ==
Devin Charles Copeland was born on June 4, 1969. He spent his early childhood in St. Petersburg, Florida, until moving to Texas before the fourth grade; first to the small town of Douglasville and then to Houston. He spent the rest of his youth moving back and forth between New Boston and Houston, finally settling in Houston after graduating from high school. Copeland smoked marijuana for the first time at a skating rink in seventh grade; marijuana later became a major influence on his music. As a teenager, Copeland became interested in breakdancing, joining several dance crews until he began rapping, which soon became his main interest.

== Musical career ==
Copeland's first musical venture was a group called 3D, which he formed alongside his brother Dexter and a friend named Jugg Mugg in 1988. Copeland subsequently met Rob Quest at a talent show; Copeland, Jugg Mugg, and Rob Quest then formed the Odd Squad (later known as the Coughee Brothaz). The Odd Squad signed to Rap-A-Lot Records, through which they released the 1994 album Fadanuf Fa Erybody!!. Fadanuf was the only album to be released under the Odd Squad name, but it attracted positive attention within Houston's rap scene, with Scarface later describing it as his favorite release on the Rap-A-Lot label.

After the release of Fadanuf, Copeland joined Scarface's Facemob, before ultimately going solo at Scarface's encouragement in 1998. Copeland released four solo albums on Rap-A-Lot over the following decade: The Dude (1998), Just Tryin' ta Live (2002), To tha X-Treme (2004), and Waitin' to Inhale (2007). He also made a number of guest appearances, including on Dr. Dre's "Fuck You" in 1999, De La Soul's "Baby Phat" in 2001, Slim Thug's "I'm Back" in 2009, Gucci Mane's "Kush Is My Cologne" in 2009 alongside Bun B & E-40, Tech N9ne's "After Party" in 2010, and Young Jeezy's "Higher Learning" in 2011.

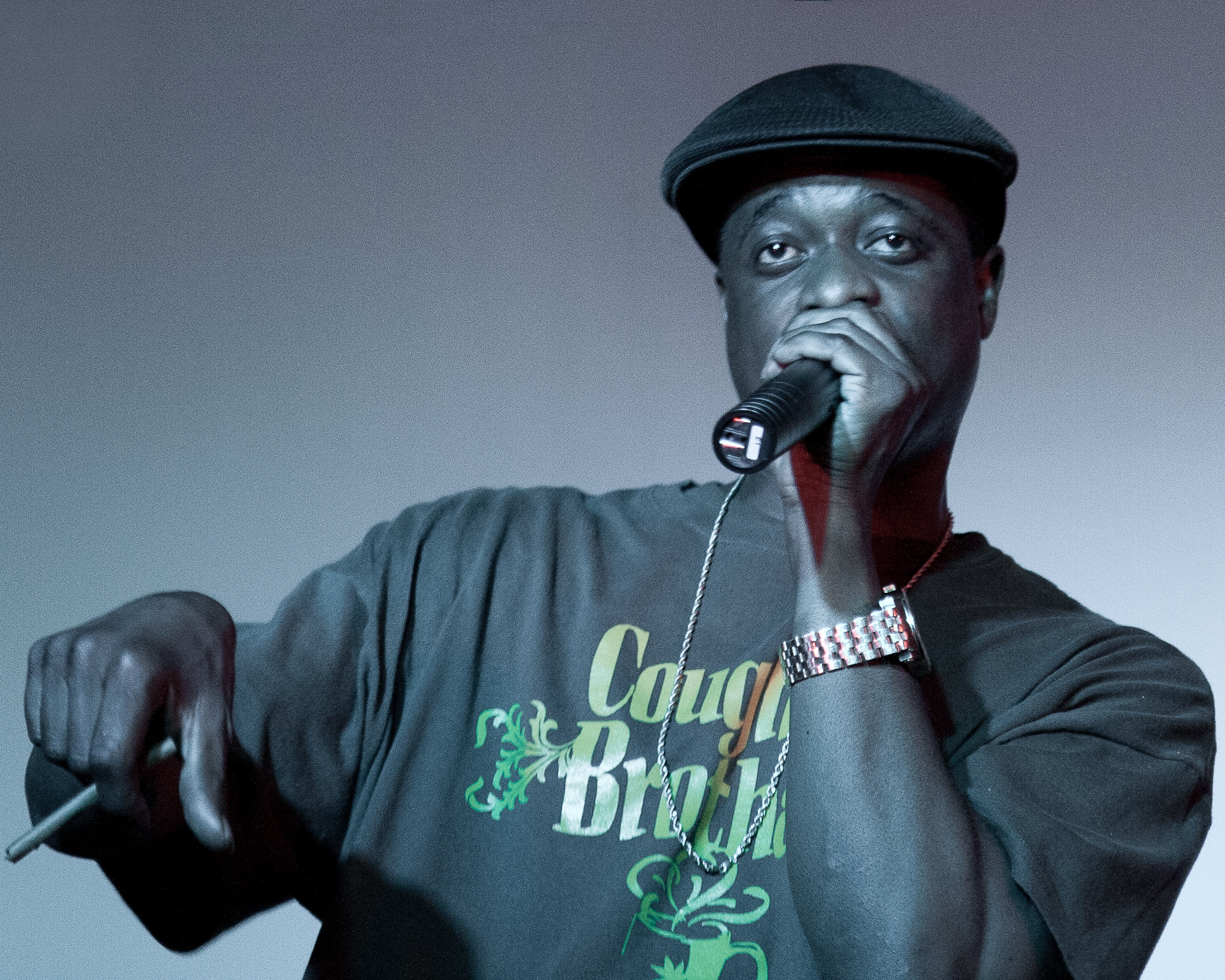
Devin the Dude in 2010

In 2007, he appeared in a documentary titled Screwed In Houston produced by VBS/Vice Magazine that details the history of the Houston rap scene.

Landing Gear (2008), Suite 420 (2010), Gotta Be Me (2010), One for the Road (2013), Acoustic Levitation (2017) and Still Rollin' Up: Somethin' To Ride With (2019).

In 2008, Copeland ended his 15-year relationship with Houston-based Rap-A-Lot Records after he decided not to renew his contract. Later that year, he signed with indie label Razor & Tie, through which he released the album Landing Gear. In 2010, Copeland released two additional albums, Suite 420 (through E1 Entertainment) and Gotta Be Me (through Real Talk Entertainment). Finally, beginning with his 2013 album One for the Road, Copeland started releasing music through his Coughee Brothaz Music imprint, distributed by Empire. His subsequent studio albums are: Acoustic Levitation (2017), Still Rollin’ Up: Somethin’ to Ride With (2019), and Soulful Distance (2021).

Outside of music, Copeland starred in the 2012 stoner comedy film Highway, in which two pot-smoking buddies go on a quest to find the best country's best cannabis on the legendary Highway 420. The soundtrack featured songs by 2 Chainz, UGK, Smoke DZA, Tha Dogg Pound, Slim Thug, Currensy, David Banner, Asher Roth and more. On June 24, 2013, Devin announced that his eighth studio album would be titled One for the Road and be released in September 2013. It was later confirmed for an October 8, 2013, release.

As of 2025, Copeland continues to tour regularly in the United States and abroad, with performances documented across multiple cities and venues.

== Cannabis culture and entrepreneurship ==
Copeland’s recordings have long been associated with cannabis themes and a relaxed, conversational delivery, leading multiple outlets to describe him as a pioneer of "stoner rap" within Southern hip hop. Critics have highlighted his "everyman" storytelling and understated humor as central to his appeal and influence.

Songs such as "Doobie Ashtray" (2002) are frequently cited for normalizing cannabis-adjacent subject matter through intimate, day-to-day narratives rather than overt advocacy; coverage has also emphasized his long-running connection to weed-centric humor and lifestyle themes.

In 2024–2025, Copeland co-created a hemp and cannabis culture brand, Coughee by Devin the Dude, developed in conjunction with The Cloud Committee, led by Manny Phesto (Manuel Levins Holden) and Vincent Santucci; brand materials describe "Coughee" as an extension of the social ritual and language that recur throughout his music. Copeland previously collaborated with Manny Phesto on the 2017 track "Dedicated". According to Rob Quest, who had been part of Copeland's group the Odd Squad, "coughee" was originally a slang term Copeland's friend group developed to be able to covertly talk about marijuana.

== Reception ==
Despite being a critical success, Devin the Dude has not achieved mainstream success. Kelefa Sanneh, writing for The New York Times in 2005, called him "A brilliant oddball with a spaced-out flow."

== Discography ==
=== Studio albums ===
List of studio albums, with selected chart positions
Title	Album details	Peak chart positions		
Title	Album details	US	US R&B	US Rap
The Dude	Released: June 16, 1998 (US); Label: Rap-A-Lot; Formats: CD, download	177	27	x
Just Tryin' ta Live	Released: January 29, 2002 (US); Label: Rap-A-Lot; Formats: CD, download	61	11	x
To tha X-Treme	Released: July 13, 2004 (US); Label: Rap-A-Lot; Formats: CD, download	55	6	x
Waitin' to Inhale	Released: March 13, 2007 (US); Label: Rap-A-Lot; Formats: CD, download	30	9	—
Landing Gear	Released: October 7, 2008 (US); Label: Razor & Tie; Formats: CD, download	47	9	—
Suite 420	Released: April 20, 2010 (US); Label: E1; Formats: CD, download	88	9	—
Gotta Be Me	Released: November 2, 2010 (US); Label: Real Talk Entertainment; Formats: CD, download	90	16	—
One for the Road	Released: October 15, 2013 (US); Label: Coughee Brothaz Music, E1 Music; Formats: CD, download	—	36	21
Acoustic Levitation	Released: March 10, 2017 (US); Label: Coughee Brothaz Music, Empire; Formats: CD, download	—	—	—
Still Rollin' Up: Somethin' to Ride With	Released: July 3, 2019 (US); Label: Coughee Brothaz Music, Empire; Formats: CD, download	—	—	—
Soulful Distance	Released: February 5, 2021 (US); Label: Coughee Brothaz Music, Empire; Formats: CD, download	—	—	—
"—" denotes a recording that did not chart. "x" denotes that chart did not exist at the time.

=== Collaboration albums ===
List of collaboration albums, with selected chart positions
Title	Album details	Peak chart positions		
Title	Album details	US	US R&B	US Rap
Fadanuf Fa Erybody!! (with Odd Squad)	Released: February 1, 1994 (US); Label: Rap-A-Lot, Priority; Formats: CD, download	—	66	x
The Other Side of the Law (with Facemob)	Released: August 7, 1996 (US); Label: Rap-A-Lot, Noo Trybe; Formats: CD, download	—	—	x
Waitin' Our Turn (with Coughee Brothaz)	Released: August 21, 2007 (US); Label: Coughee Brothaz Music; Formats: CD, download	—	72	—
Fresh Brew (with Coughee Brothaz)	Released: April 19, 2011 (US); Label: Coughee Brothaz Music; Formats: CD, download	—	—	—
"—" denotes a recording that did not chart. "x" denotes that chart did not exist at the time.

=== Compilation albums ===
List of compilation albums, with selected chart positions
Title	Album details	Peak chart positions		
Title	Album details	US	US R&B	US Rap
Smoke Sessions, Vol. 1	Released: April 1, 2008 (US); Label: Starz Music; Formats: CD, download	—	83	—
Greatest Hits	Released: May 13, 2008 (US); Label: Rap-A-Lot; Formats: CD, download	—	66	—
Hi Life	Released: October 7, 2008 (US); Label: Rap-A-Lot; Formats: CD, download	—	29	—
"—" denotes a recording that did not chart.

=== Extended plays ===
List of extended plays, with selected chart positions
Title	Album details	Peak chart positions		
Title	Album details	US	US R&B	US Rap
Do Not DistHerb (Suite #420)	Released: May 16, 2010 (US); Label: E1; Formats: CD, download	—	—	—
Seriously Trippin'	Released: May 22, 2012 (US); Label: E1; Formats: CD, download	—	—	—
The Cannabis (with PT the UnderBoss and Coughee Brothaz)	Released: April 20, 2021 (US); Label: Can't Stop It Ent.; Formats: CD, download	—	—	—
"—" denotes a recording that did not chart.

=== Singles ===
List of singles, with selected chart positions, showing year released and album name
Title	Year	Peak chart positions		Album
Title	Year	US	US R&B	Album
"Lacville '79" (Devin the Dude)	2002	—	124	Lacville '79
"What a Job" (Devin the Dude featuring Snoop Dogg and Andre 3000)	2007	—	124	Waitin' to Inhale
"—" denotes a recording that did not chart.

=== Guest appearances ===
List of non-single guest appearances, with other performing artists, showing year released and album name
Title	Year	Other artist(s)	Album
"Thanks for the Blessing"	1993	5th Ward Boyz, Bushwick Bill	Ghetto Dope
"Hand of the Dead Body"	1994	Scarface, Ice Cube	The Diary
"Pussy, Weed & Alcohol"	1997	5th Ward Boyz, Willie D	Usual Suspects
"Money Makes the World Go 'Round"	1997	Scarface, Daz Dillinger, K.B.	The Untouchable
"Southside: Houston, Texas"	1998	Scarface, Tela	My Homies
"Fuck Faces"	1998	Scarface, Too Short, Tela	My Homies
"Do What You Want"	1998	Scarface	My Homies
"Boo Boo'n"	1998	Scarface	My Homies
"Like Some Hoes"	1998	Geto Boys	Da Good da Bad & da Ugly
"Better Now"	1999	Big Mike, MC Breed	Hard to Hit
"P.W.A."	1999	5th Ward Boyz, Willy D	Keep It Poppin'
"Fuck You"	1999	Dr. Dre, Snoop Dogg	2001
"Drugs"	2000	Tela	The World Ain't Enuff
"Superstar"	2000	E.S.G., Double D	City Under Siege
"4 O'Clock in da Mornin"	2000	Bun B, Middl Fngz	Live! from da Manjah
"Life Without Fear"	2000	Ice Water Slaughter, June Bugg of Criminal Elament	Life Without Fear
"When We Ride"	2000	Big Gank, Myti	8mm Film
"Just Sex"	2000	Lil Sin, Billy Cook	Livin in Sin
"In & Out"	2000	Scarface, Too Short	The Last of a Dying Breed
"Strange"	2001	918, K.B.	Reincarnated
"Ain't That a Bitch (Ask Yourself)"	2001	UGK	Dirty Money
"Pussy"	2002	Jay-Z, R. Kelly	The Best of Both Worlds
"Issues"	2002	Luniz, KB	Silver & Black
"Pimp Life"	2002	Too Short, Bun B, Big Gipp	What's My Favorite Word?
"Keep Goin'"	2002	Kool G Rap, Snoop Dogg	—N/a
"Only Your Mother"	2003	Scarface, Tela	Balls and My Word
"Ooh Na Na Naa Naa"	2003	Lil Jon & The East Side Boyz, Oobie	Kings of Crunk
"Just Sex"	2003	Big Mello, Billy Cook	Done Deal
"Ya Boy"	2003	Yukmouth, Ampichino	Godzilla
"Hey, Let's Go"	2003	Too Short, Cutty Cartel	Married to the Game
"Don't Fake"	2004	Trae, Bun B	Same Thing Different Day
"Still We Ride"	2004	Sambow	Sambow
"Where Can We Go"	2004	The Alchemist	1st Infantry
"Poisonous"	2004	Dilated Peoples	Neighborhood Watch
"Somebody's Gotta Do It"	2004	The Roots	The Tipping Point
"Signz of Hate"	2005	K-Rino, Trae, Top Dog, Wicked Cricket	Fear No Evil
"Back Up Plan"	2005	Paul Wall, Chamillionaire	Controversy Sells
"Ain't No Tellin"	2005	Baby Drew	Street Music
"The Mule"	2005	Z-Ro, Juvenile	Let the Truth Be Told
"Porno Bitches"	2005	Bizarre, Big Boi, Kon Artis	Hannicap Circus
"Everytime"	2005	Pimp C	Sweet James Jones Stories
"Body Rock wit Me"	2005	Lil' Keke	Undaground All Stars: The Texas Line Up
"I'm Gone"	2005	Capone, Butch Cassidy	Pain, Time & Glory
"Deez Bitches"	2006	Scarface, Lil Ron, Dolla Boy	My Homies Part 2
"So Tired"	2006	Hi-Tek, Bun B, Pretty Ugly, Dion	Hi-Teknology²: The Chip
"Coming Home"	2007	Big Hawk, Chamillionaire, Trae	Endangered Species
"Beneath the Diamonds"	2007	DJ Drama, Twista, La the Darkman, Kon Artis	Gangsta Grillz: The Album
"All Wrong"	2007	The Alchemist	The Cutting Room Floor 2
"We Gonna Get Blowed"	2007	Big WIll, Neeko Mag, Keon	Thug Paraphernalia
"Sache' Shades"	2007	Gator Main, The Ballplayas, Big Moe	Texas The Album
"Replay"	2007	Numskull	Numworld
"Long Time Comin'"	2007	Special Teamz	Stereotypez
"Rocky Road"	2007	Chamillionaire	Ultimate Victory
"The Best Thing Goin'"	2008	Yukmouth, Richie Rich, Too Short, Danice "The Morning Star"	Million Dollar Mouthpiece
"Kush Is My Cologne"	2009	Gucci Mane, Bun B, E-40	The State vs. Radric Davis
"From Behind"	2009	Caviar, E-40	The Genesis
"Mind of Ah Madman"	2009	Tha Realest, Sean P.	Witness Tha Realest
"Keep Callin'"	2009	The Jacka	Tear Gas
"I'm Back"	2009	Slim Thug	Boss of All Bosses
"Give Me a Call"	2009	Mike Jones	The Voice
"Get High 2 Day"	2010	Alaska Redd	Trapped in the Land of the Frozen
"Chilled Coughphee"	2010	Currensy	Pilot Talk
"Moon & Stars"	2010	Big K.R.I.T.	K.R.I.T. Wuz Here
"Caddy Music"	2010	Slim Thug, Dre Day	Tha Thug Show
"Afterparty"	2010	Tech N9ne, Kutt Calhoun	The Gates Mixed Plate
"Rollin' & Smokin'"	2010	Spice 1, 2Pac, Scarface	—N/a
"Smoke Everyday"	2010	Paul Wall, Z-Ro	Heart of a Champion
"Lie to You"	2010	Stat Quo, Raheem DeVaughn	Statlanta
"Lookin' Back"	2011	E-40	Revenue Retrievin': Overtime Shift
"Up & Down"	2011	Baby Drew, Ges	Bar-B-Que or Mildew
"Higher Learning"	2011	Young Jeezy, Snoop Dogg, Mitchelle'l	TM103 Hustlerz Ambition
"I Don't Need No Bitch"	2011	Snoop Dogg, Kobe Honeycutt	Doggumentary
"What the Lovers Do"	2011	Saigon	The Greatest Story Never Told
"Never Low"	2011	Marcus Manchild	Spaced Out
"White Papers"	2011	Smoke DZA	The Hustlers Catalog
"Hydroplaning"	2012	Big K.R.I.T.	Live from the Underground
"Doobie in the Ashtray"	2012	Baby Bash, Young Dru	M.S.U.
"I'm A Stop"	2012	Too Short, 50 Cent, Twista	No Trespassing
"Highway"	2012	Smoke DZA, June Summers	Substance Abuse
"Marley & Me (Remix)"	2012	Smoke DZA, Currensy, Asher Roth	Substance Abuse
"On One"	2013	Bun B, The Gator Main	Trill OG: The Epilogue
"My Issues and Me"	2013	Anttwon Lewis, Cold Play	The Pharaoh & the Disciple
"Wut the Fuk"	2013	Cory Mo, Slim Thug	Country Raptunes, Vol. 2
"Gettin High"	2013	Cory Mo, B.o.B, Chalie Boy	It's Been About Time
"Gettin High"	2013	Cory Mo, Daz Dillinger, Chamillionaire	Take It or Leave It
"I Wouldn't Mind"	2013	AD, Starbuks	Intelligent Design
"Destiny"	2014	t.h.e. MisFit Crazy8	Re-State of Emergency
"Get Blowed"	2014	Daz Dillinger, Snoop Dogg	Weed Money
"Broke"	2014	Acie High	L.O.V.E
"Elevated"	2014	A-Wax	Jr. High to the Pen Vol. 2
"Get Lifted"	2014	King Chip	—N/a
"1 Hit"	2014	Berner, B-Real	Prohibition
"Mo Better Cool"	2014	Big K.R.I.T., Big Sant, Bun B	Cadillactica
"Best Believe"	2014	Lil' Keke, Paul Wall	Money Don't Sleep
"Pussy"	2014	Stat Quo	ATLA: All This Life Allows, Vol. 1
"Ain't Said Shit"	2015	Pimp C, Ty Dolla Sign	Long Live the Pimp
"I Needs Mine"	2015	Scotty ATL, 8Ball	The Cooligan
"Get More"	2015	Berner, Cam'ron	Contraband
"Crumble the Satellite"	2015	Paul Wall, Currensy	Slab God
"Propane"	2016	Rittz, MJG	Top of the Line
"Stories"	2016	Berner, B-Real	Prohibition, Pt. 3
"Coming Dine"	2016	Ingrid, Kirko Bangz	Trill Feels
"Disrespectful"	2016	Mistah F.A.B., Too Short, Erk tha Jerk	Son of a Pimp Part 2
"This Far"	2017	Outlawz	#LastOnezLeft
"420 (Blaze Up)"	2017	Snoop Dogg, Wiz Khalifa, DJ Battlecat	Neva Left / Grow House
"Dedicated"	2017	Manny Phesto	—
"Noid"	2018	Berner, Snoop Dogg	The Big Pescado
"May Sound Crazy"	2019	Erick Sermon, Too Short	Vernia
"Chitty Bang"	2021	Prof, Jarren Benton	—N/a
"Feel Good"	2022	Bun B & Cory Mo, Mattie B.	Mo Trill
"Love You to Bits"	2022	Winston Surfshirt	Panna Cotta
