= Just Tryin' ta Live =

Studio album by Devin the Dude
- Released: August 27, 2002
- Recorded: 2001–2002
- Studios: COUGHee Pot Studio (Houston, TX); Hippie House Studios (Houston, TX); Enterprise Studios (Burbank, CA); Larrabee Studio (Hollywood, CA); Record One (Sherman Oaks, CA)
- Genre: Hip-hop
- Length: 1:05:34
- Label: Rap-A-Lot
- Producers: David Banner; Devin the Dude; DJ Premier; DJ Styles; Domo; Dr. Dre; Luster Baker; Mike Dean; Raphael Saadiq; Rob Quest; T-Mix

Devin the Dude chronology
The Dude (1998)	Just Tryin' ta Live (2002)	To tha X-Treme (2004)

Professional ratings
Review scores
Source	Rating
AllMusic	4/5 stars
Pitchfork	8.7/10
RapReviews	8/10
XXL	XL (4/5)

Just Tryin' ta Live is the second solo studio album by American rapper Devin the Dude. It was released on August 27, 2002 via Rap-A-Lot Records. Recording sessions took place at Coughee Pot Studio and Hippie House Studios in Houston, Enterprise Studios in Burbank, Larrabee Studio in Hollywood and Record One in Sherman Oaks. Production was handled by Rob Quest, Michael "Domo" Poye, Mike Dean, David Banner, DJ Premier, DJ Styles, Dr. Dre, Luster Baker, Raphael Saadiq, T-Mix, and Devin the Dude himself. It features guest appearances from Odd Squad, Nas, Poo Bear, Raphael Saadiq and Xzibit. In the United States, the album peaked at number 61 on the Billboard 200 and number 11 on the Top R&B/Hip-Hop Albums charts.

== Track listing ==
No.	Title	Writer(s)	Producer(s)	Length
1.	"Zeldar"	Devin Copeland; Michael Poye	Domo	2:35
2.	"It's a Shame" (featuring Pooh Bear)	Copeland; Andre Young	Dr. Dre	3:45
3.	"R & B"	Copeland; Robert McQueen; Dexter Johnson; R. Ellison; Herbert Cross; Michael Dean	Mike Dean; Blind Rob	4:13
4.	"Lacville '79"	Copeland; Derek Edwards	Devin the Dude	5:16
5.	"I-Hi"	Copeland; Poye	Domo	3:06
6.	"Who's That Man, Moma"	Copeland; McQueen	Devin the Dude; Blind Rob	5:46
7.	"Some of 'Em" (featuring Xzibit and Nas)	Copeland; Alvin Joiner; Nasir Jones; Tristan Jones	T-Mix	3:13
8.	"Go Somewhere"	Copeland; McQueen; Dean	Blind Rob; Devin the Dude; Mike Dean	4:08
9.	"Whatever"	Copeland; Poye; McQueen	Domo; Blind Rob	1:10
10.	"Would Ya?"	Copeland; Poye; McQueen	Domo; Blind Rob	4:01
11.	"Doobie Ashtray"	Copeland; Christopher Martin	DJ Premier	5:16
12.	"Just a Man" (featuring Raphael Saadiq)	Copeland; Charles Ray Wiggins; Robert C. Ozuna Jr.; Glenn D. Standridge II	Raphael Saadiq	3:59
13.	"Fa Sho" (performed by Odd Squad)	Copeland; McQueen; Johnson; Dean; Carlos Garza	Blind Rob; Mike Dean	4:18
14.	"WXYZ"	Copeland; McQueen; Poye	Devin the Dude; Blind Rob; Domo; Luster Baker	3:47
15.	"Tough Love"	Copeland; McQueen; Garza	Blind Rob; D. J. Styles; Troy Mason (co.)	5:34
16.	"Just Tryin ta Live" (performed by Odd Squad)	Copeland; McQueen; Johnson; Ellison; Cross; Dean	Mike Dean; David Banner	5:27
Total length:				1:05:34

Notes

- Track 9 contains samples of Ice-T's "Intro" written by Tracy Marrow.
- Track 11 contains interpolation of four bars of chorus from "Don't Do Me This Way" written by Kevin McCord and performed by Alicia Myers.

== Charts ==
Chart (2002)	Peak position
US Billboard 200	61
US Top R&B/Hip-Hop Albums (Billboard)	11
