= No Surrender, No Retreat =

No Surrender, No Retreat may refer to:

- No Surrender... No Retreat (album), a 1998 album by Bushwick Bill
- "No Surrender, No Retreat" (Babylon 5), a television episode
