= Panther (film) =

1995 film about the Black Panther Party

- Theatrical release poster
- Directed by: Mario Van Peebles
- Screenplay by: Melvin Van Peebles
- Based on: Panther by Melvin Van Peebles
- Produced by: Preston L. Holmes; Mario Van Peebles; Melvin Van Peebles
- Starring: Kadeem Hardison; Bokeem Woodbine; Joe Don Baker; Courtney B. Vance; Marcus Chong; Tyrin Turner; James Russo; Nefertiti; M. Emmet Walsh
- Cinematography: Edward J. Pei
- Edited by: Earl Watson
- Music by: Stanley Clarke
- Production companies: PolyGram Filmed Entertainment; Working Title Films; TriBeCa Productions; MVP Films
- Distributed by: Gramercy Pictures (United States); PolyGram Filmed Entertainment (United Kingdom)
- Release date: May 3, 1995
- Running time: 123 minutes
- Countries: United Kingdom; United States
- Language: English
- Budget: $7.5 million
- Box office: $8 million

Panther is a 1995 cinematic adaptation of Melvin Van Peebles's novel Panther, produced and directed by Mario Van Peebles. The drama film portrays the Black Panther Party for Self-Defense, tracing the organization from its founding through its decline in a compressed timeframe. It was the first narrative feature film to depict the Black Panther Party.

== Plot summary ==
In this semi-fictionalized account of the origins of the Black Panthers, Vietnam veteran Judge (Kadeem Hardison) returns to his hometown of Oakland to find it beset by violence and police discrimination against African-Americans. Judge's friend Cy tells him about a vigilante group that's organizing against the police and introduces him to its leaders, Bobby (Courtney B. Vance) and Huey (Marcus Chong). Judge joins the movement but is soon beset by police pressure to inform against Huey.

== Cast ==
- Kadeem Hardison as Judge
- Courtney B. Vance as Bobby Seale
- Marcus Chong as Huey P. Newton
- Lahmard Tate as Gene McKinney
- Nefertiti as Alma
- Tyrin Turner as Cy
- Bokeem Woodbine as Tyrone
- Joe Don Baker as Brimmer
- Wesley Jonathan as Bobby Hutton
- M. Emmet Walsh as Dorsett
- Anthony Griffith as Eldridge Cleaver
- Chris Rock as Yuck Mouth
- Mario Van Peebles as Stokely Carmichael
- Chris Tucker as Bodyguard
- Bobby Brown as Rose
- Angela Bassett as Betty Shabazz (uncredited)
- Jenifer Lewis as Rita
- Dick Gregory as Reverend Slocum
- James LeGros as Bob Avakian
- Kool Moe Dee as Jamaal
- Roger Guenveur Smith as Pruitt
- Richard Dysart as J. Edgar Hoover
- Michael Wincott as Tynan
- James Russo as Rodgers
- Mark Curry as Lombard
- Jeris Poindexter as Black Cop
- Melvin Van Peebles as Old Jail Bird
- Robert Culp as Charles Garry

== Reception ==
On Rotten Tomatoes, the film holds a 25% approval rating based on 12 reviews, with an average rating of 5.2/10. Roger Ebert stated "There is a fascinating study to be made of the Black Panther Party. Panther is not that film." Panther co-founder Bobby Seale, a major character in the film, called it "80 percent to 90 percent" untrue and "a false-light invasion of my privacy." While Kenneth Turan of the Los Angeles Times praised it as a "sincere attempt at celebratory, spirit-raising filmmaking", he also criticized it as "a frustrating amalgam of truth, violence, supposition and inspiration".

The film grossed $6,834,525 in the United States and Canada and $8 million worldwide.

== Soundtrack ==
Panther

Soundtrack album by various artists
- Released: May 2, 1995
- Recorded: August 1994 – March 1995
- Genres: Hip hop, R&B
- Length: 77:23
- Label: Mercury
- Producer: Various artists

Singles from Panther
- 1. "Freedom (Theme from Panther)" Released: April 15, 1995; 2. "The Points" Released: 1995

Professional ratings
Review scores
Source	Rating
AllMusic	link
Smash Hits	2/5 stars

A soundtrack for the film containing R&B and hip hop music was released on May 2, 1995 by Mercury Records. It peaked at number 37 on the Billboard 200 and number 5 on the Top R&B/Hip-Hop Albums chart and was certified gold on July 25, 1995. Featured on the soundtrack is the single "Freedom (Theme from Panther)", a collaboration among more than 60 female R&B singers and rappers that peaked at No. 45 on the Billboard Hot 100.

Three singles made it to the Billboard charts, "Head Nod" by Hodge, "The Points", a collaboration between 12 of hip-hop's most popular artists and groups at the time, and "Freedom (Theme from Panther)", a collaboration between over 60 female R&B singers and rappers.

1. "Freedom (Theme from Panther)" (The Black Bag Mix) – 4:47 (Aaliyah, Felicia Adams, May May Ali, Amel Larrieux, Az-Iz, Blackgirl, Mary J. Blige, Tanya Blount, Brownstone, Casserine, Changing Faces, Coko, Tyler Collins, N'Dea Davenport, E.V.E., Emage, En Vogue, Eshe & Laurneá (of Arrested Development), Female, For Real, Penny Ford, Lalah Hathaway, Jade, Jamecia, Jazzyfatnastees, Queen Latifah, Billy Lawrence, Joi, Brigette McWilliams, Milira, Miss Jones, Cindy Mizelle, Monica, Me’Shell NdegéOcello, Natasha, Pebbles, Pure Soul, Raja-Nee, Brenda Russell, SWV, Chantay Savage, Sonja Marie, Tracie Spencer, Sweet Sable, TLC, Terri & Monica, Vybe, Crystal Waters, Caron Wheeler, Karyn White, Vanessa Williams, Xscape, Y?N-Vee & Zhané)
2. "Express Yourself" – 3:48 (Joe)
3. "We'll Meet Again" – 4:43 (Blackstreet)
4. "Black People" – 4:11 (Funkadelic featuring George Clinton and Belita Woods)
5. "Let's Straighten It Out" – 4:10 (Monica and Usher)
6. "The Points" – 4:56 (Big Mike, Biggie Smalls, Bone Thugs-n-Harmony, Buckshot, Busta Rhymes, Coolio, Digable Planets, Heltah Skeltah, Ill Al Skratch, Jamal, Menace Clan & Redman)
7. "Slick Partner" – 2:48 (Bobby Brown)
8. "Stand" (You Got To) – 4:35 (Aaron Hall)
9. "The World Is a Ghetto" – 4:32 (Da Lench Mob)
10. "If I Were Your Woman" – 4:36 (Shanice featuring Female)
11. "We Shall Not Be Moved" – 4:49 (Sounds of Blackness featuring Black Sheep)
12. "Natural Woman" – 3:48 (Female)
13. "Freedom (Theme from Panther)" (Dallas' Dirty Half Dozen Mix) – 4:51 (MC Lyte, Meshell Ndegeocello, Nefertiti, Patra, Queen Latifah, Salt-n-Pepa, Left Eye of TLC, Da 5 Footaz, & Yo-Yo)
14. "Head Nod" – 3:34 (Hodge)
15. "Stand!" – 4:28 (Tony! Toni! Toné!)
16. "Don't Give Me No Broccoli and Tell Me It's Greens (What Happened to Our Rhythm)" – 6:18 (The Last Poets)
17. "Star-Spangled Banner" – 3:12 (Brian McKnight and the Boys Choir of Harlem)
18. "The Ultimate Sacrifice" – 3:16 composed by (Stanley Clarke)

== Awards ==
- Locarno International Film Festival – Prize of the Ecumenical Jury, Special Mention: Silver Leopard

== Bibliography ==
- Peebles, Mario Van; Taylor, Ura Y.; Lewis, J. Tanika; Peebles, Melvin Van (1995). Panther: The Pictorial History of the Black Panthers and the Story Behind the Film. HarperCollins. ISBN 9781557042279.
