= Hi Life (album) =

Studio album by Devin the Dude
- Released: September 7, 2008
- Studios: The Coughee Pot (Houston, TX); Dean's List House of Hits (Cypress, TX)
- Genre: Hip-hop
- Label: Rap-A-Lot
- Producers: Alchemist; Caviar; Domo; Dr. Dre; Lil' Chief; Mike Dean

Devin the Dude chronology
Waitin Our Turn (2007)	Hi Life (2008)	Landing Gear (2008)

Professional ratings
Review scores
Source	Rating
AllMusic	3/5 stars

Hi Life is the fifth solo studio album by American rapper Devin the Dude. It was released on September 7, 2008, via Rap-A-Lot Records. Recording sessions took place at the Coughee Pot in Houston and Dean's List House of Hits in Cypress. Production was handled by Domo, Mike Dean, Caviar, Dr. Dre, Lil' Chief and the Alchemist. It features guest appearances from 14K, Bushwick Bill, Gar, K.B., Molew The Mic Wrecka, and the Coughee Brothaz. The album peaked at number 29 on the Top R&B/Hip-Hop Albums chart in the United States.

== Track listing ==
No.	Title	Writer(s)	Producer(s)	Length
1.	"Bad Company"	Devin Copeland; Michael Dean	Mike Dean	3:54
2.	"My Occupation" (featuring Bushwick Bill)	Copeland; T. Randle	Lil' Chief	4:43
3.	"Comin' Back"	Copeland; Andre Young	Dr. Dre	3:54
4.	"Where Can We Go"	Copeland; Dean; Alan Maman	Mike Dean; Alchemist	4:34
5.	"17 Holes" (performed by the Coughee Brothaz)	Copeland; Kannon Cross	Caviar	7:30
6.	"Lil Mary Juana"	Copeland; Michael Poye	Domo	3:55
7.	"Run" (featuring Gar)	Copeland; Poye	Domo	3:17
8.	"Don't Stop"	Copeland; Poye	Domo	3:02
9.	"Everyday" (featuring KB)	Copeland; Poye	Domo	4:46
10.	"Gettin' Crazy" (featuring 14K)	Copeland; Poye	Domo	3:38
11.	"Get High"	Copeland; Poye	Domo	3:52
12.	"Come On" (featuring Molew The Mic Wrecka)	Copeland; Dean	Mike Dean	5:32

== Personnel ==
- Devin "The Dude" Copeland – vocals
- Richard "Bushwick Bill" Shaw – vocals (track 2)
- Coughee Brothaz – vocals (track 5)
- Vandell "Gar" Smith – vocals (track 7)
- Kevin "KB" Brown – vocals (track 9)
- Brandon Harris – vocals (track 10)
- Kyle White – vocals (track 10)
- Monica "Molew The Mic Wrecka" Lewis – vocals (track 12)
- Mike Dean – producer (tracks: 1, 4, 12), mixing, mastering
- T. "Lil' Chief" Randle – producer (track 2)
- Andre "Dr. Dre" Young – producer (track 3)
- Alan "The Alchemist" Maman – producer (track 4)
- Kannon "Caviar" Cross – producer (track 5)
- Michael "Domo" Poye – producer (tracks: 6–11)
- James "J. Prince" Smith – executive producer
- Charles Mazoch – design, layout
- Tony "Big Chief" Randle – A&R
- Anzel "Int'l Red" Jennings – A&R
- Anthony Price – A&R

== Charts ==
Chart (2008)	Peak position
US Top R&B/Hip-Hop Albums (Billboard)	29
