= Ghetto Dope =

Studio album by 5th Ward Boyz
- Released: May 1993
- Recorded: 1992–93
- Studios: Jungle Style Studios (Houston, TX); Digital Services (Houston, TX)
- Genres: Southern hip-hop; gangsta rap; hardcore hip-hop
- Length: 48:26
- Labels: Underground; Rap-A-Lot; Priority
- Producers: J Prince; John Bido; Mike Dean; N.O. Joe

5th Ward Boyz chronology
Ghetto Dope (1993)	Gangsta Funk (1994)

Singles from Ghetto Dope
- 1. "Thanks for the Blessing" Released: May 24, 1993

Professional ratings
Review scores
Source	Rating
AllMusic	1.5/5 stars
RapReviews	7/10

Ghetto Dope is the debut studio album by American hip-hop group 5th Ward Boyz. It was released in May 1993 through a joint venture between O.G. Dewey Forker's Underground Records and J. Prince's Rap-A-Lot Records with distribution via Priority Records. Recording sessions took place at Jungle Style Studios and at Digital Services in Houston. Production was handled by John Bido, Mike Dean, N.O. Joe, and J. Prince, who was also serving as executive producer together with Edward Russell and O.G. Dewey. It features guest appearances from Bushwick Bill, Devin the Dude and Scarface. Member Richard "Lo Life" Nash was absent on the project due to his imprisonment.

The album peaked at number 176 on the Billboard 200, number 19 on the Top R&B/Hip-Hop Albums and number 26 on the Top Heatseekers. Its lead single, "Thanks for the Blessing", did not make it to the Billboard charts.

== Track listing ==
No.	Title	Length
1.	"Intro"	0:58
2.	"Ho Shit"	3:11
3.	"Studio Gangster" (featuring Scarface)	4:06
4.	"Down Azz Zaggin"	3:14
5.	"Bitch Pleeze"	3:55
6.	"Bringing Hats"	2:50
7.	"5th of Ghetto"	5:00
8.	"Same Ol Shit"	3:11
9.	"Blood, Sweat & Glory"	2:55
10.	"Gotta Be Down to Die"	4:06
11.	"Undercover Gangstas"	4:06
12.	"Ghetto Curse Words"	2:11
13.	"Punks and Guns"	3:04
14.	"Thanks for the Blessing" (featuring Bushwick Bill and Devin the Dude)	4:23
15.	"Outro"	1:16
Total length:		48:26

== Personnel ==
- Andre "007" Barnes – main performer
- Eric "E-Rock" Taylor – main performer
- Brad Jordan – rap vocals (track 3)
- James A. Smith – voice (track 11), producer, executive producer
- Richard Stephen Shaw – rap vocals (track 14)
- Devin Copeland – vocals (track 14)
- Michael George Dean – producer, mixing, mastering, engineering
- John Okuribido – producer, mixing
- Joseph Johnson – producer, mixing
- John Moran – mastering
- "O.G. Dewey" Forker – executive producer
- Edward Russell – executive producer
- Leroy Robinson Jr. – art direction, design

== Charts ==
Chart (1993)	Peak position
US Billboard 200	176
US Top R&B/Hip-Hop Albums (Billboard)	19
US Heatseekers Albums (Billboard)	26
