= Acoustic Levitation (album) =

Studio album by Devin the Dude
- Released: March 10, 2017
- Studio: iMix Studios (Houston, TX)
- Genre: Hip-hop
- Length: 58:36
- Label: Coughee Brothaz
- Producer: Adrian Jackson; Chuck Heat; Coache J; Luster Baker; Rob Quest; Roc & Mayne; Steven C. Espinoza

Devin the Dude chronology
One for the Road (2013)	Acoustic Levitation (2017)	Still Rollin' Up: Somethin' to Ride With (2019)

Professional ratings
Review scores
Source	Rating
Exclaim!	7/10
HipHopDX	3.7/5
RapReviews	6.5/10
XXL	4/5

Acoustic Levitation is the tenth solo studio album by American rapper Devin the Dude. It was released on March 10, 2017, via Coughee Brothaz Entertainment. Production was handled by Rob Quest, Roc & Mayne, Adrian Jackson, Chuck Heat, Coache J, Luster Baker and Steven C. Espinoza. It features guest appearances from Tony Mack, Lisa Luv, Roe Hummin, and his Odd Squad cohorts Jugg Mugg and Rob Quest. The album debuted at number 38 on the Billboard Independent Albums chart in the United States.

== Track listing ==
All tracks are written by Devin Copeland, except track 2 written with Luster E. Tone, track 4 written with Dexter Johnson, and track 7 written with Angel Allen.

No.	Title	Producer(s)	Length
1.	"Can I"	Rob Quest	3:10
2.	"Are You Goin' My Way?" (featuring Tony Mack and Lisa Luv)	Rob Quest; Adrian Jackson	3:32
3.	"Please Pass That to Me"	Roc & Mayne	3:46
4.	"We High Right Now" (performed by Odd Squad)	Rob Quest	4:05
5.	"By" (featuring Tony Mack)	Rob Quest	4:10
6.	"Acoustic Levitation"	Rob Quest	5:56
7.	"I'm in the Galaxy" (featuring Roe Hummin)	Coache J	3:45
8.	"Tonight"	Rob Quest	5:16
9.	"Apartment #8216"	Steven C. Espinoza	3:51
10.	"It's Cold in Here"	Chuck Heat	3:39
11.	"Due Yo Thang"	Rob Quest	4:07
12.	"Don't Get Naked"	Roc & Mayne	3:57
13.	"You Know I Wantcha'"	Roc & Mayne	4:51
14.	"Do You Love Gettin' High?"	Luster Baker	4:31
Total length:			58:36

== Personnel ==
- Devin "The Dude" Copeland – vocals, mixing, executive producer, photography
- Luster "Tony Mack" Tone – additional vocals (tracks: 1, 5, 8, 11, 12)
- Lisa Lee – additional vocals (track 2)
- Luster Baker – additional vocals (track 11), producer (track 14)
- Yosuke Azuma – additional vocals (track 11), bass (track 2), recording, mixing
- Robert "Blind Rob" McQueen – producer (tracks: 1, 2, 4–6, 8, 11), mixing
- Adrian Jackson – producer (track 2)
- Corbin Todd Roe – producer (tracks: 3, 12, 13)
- Wilber Martin – producer (tracks: 3, 12, 13)
- "Coache" J. Johnson – producer (track 7)
- Steven C. Espinoza – producer (track 9)
- Charles "Chuck Heat" Henderson – producer (track 10)
- Stephan "Steve-O" Townsend – recording (track 13)
- James Hoover – mastering
- Mike Frost – cover

== Charts ==
Chart (2017)	Peak position
US Independent Albums (Billboard)	38
