= One for the Road (Devin the Dude album) =

Studio album by Devin the Dude
- Released: October 15, 2013
- Recorded: 2012–13
- Genre: Hip-hop
- Length: 54:45
- Label: Coughee Brothaz; eOne
- Producer: Albie Dickson; Chinky P; Chuck Heat; C-Ray Sullivan; Devin the Dude; DJ Styles; Domo; Even Brenna; Garrett Brown; Jose Ignacio Gorbea; Reggie Coby; Rob Quest; Tha Bizness; Thomas Knudsen

Devin the Dude chronology
Gotta Be Me (2010)	One for the Road (2013)	Acoustic Levitation (2017)

Singles from One for the Road
- 1. "Probably Should Have" Released: September 12, 2013

One for the Road is the ninth solo studio album by American rapper Devin the Dude. It was released on October 15, 2013, through Coughee Brothaz Music and Entertainment One. Recording sessions took place at Devin's crib, except for two songs, which were recorded at the Coughee Pot. Production was handled by Albie Dickson, Chinky P, Chuck Heat, C-Ray Sullivan, DJ Styles, Domo, Even Brenna, Garrett Brown, Jose Ignacio Gorbea, Reggie Coby, Rob Quest, Tha Bizness, Thomas Knudsen, and Devin himself, who also served as executive producer. It features guest appearances from his Odd Squad cohorts Rob Quest and Jugg Mugg, as well as Angela Williams, DNA, Kidricc James, Rum, Shun Ward, and Snap.

In the United States, the album peaked at number 198 Top Current Album Sales, number 36 on the Top R&B/Hip-Hop Albums and number 21 on the Top Rap Albums charts.

== Background ==
In November 2010, Devin the Dude released his seventh studio album Gotta Be Me, under Real Talk Entertainment. In April 2012, Devin the Dude announced that his eighth studio album would be titled One for the Road and announced that it would be released in June 2012. After a year of relative musical silence, on June 24, 2013, Devin the Dude announced, that his eighth studio album would be titled One for the Road and would be released in September 2013.

On September 13, 2013, it was announced that the album would be released on October 8, 2013, via independent powerhouse eOne Music. The same day Devin revealed the cover artwork for the album. The cover art plays on popular cliches, with "Devin sitting at a bar looking like he has already had a couple alcoholic drinks for the road, while being handed a CD which is presumably also for the road." On September 21, 2013, the album was pushed back one week from October 8, 2013, until October 15, 2013.

== Release and promotion ==
After announcing the album, during April through May 12, 2012 Devin the Dude toured the United States. Devin the Dude then released an EP titled, Seriously Trippin on May 22, 2012, in promotion of his upcoming album. On October 8, 2013, the album was released for free streaming, for a limited time via SoundCloud.

On September 12, 2013, Devin the Dude released the album's first single, "Probably Should Have" which features him reflecting on past relationships that ended bad. The song's smooth production was handled by Thomas Knudsen and Even Brenna. On September 20, 2013, "Probably Should Have" was serviced to urban contemporary radio. The music video was released on October 14, 2013.

== Critical reception ==
Professional ratings
Review scores
Source	Rating
AllMusic	3.5/5 stars
HipHopDX	3/5
Iowa State Daily	2.5/5
RapReviews	7/10

One for the Road was met with generally favorable reviews from music critics. AllMusic's David Jeffries gave the album a positive 3.5 out of 5 stars, calling it another Devin the Dude's "album about smoking weed". Grant Jones of RapReviews called it "definitely a grown-up piece of hip hop, particularly when it comes to the choice of production", suggesting listeners would "enjoy One for the Road regardless of intoxicant". Andrew Gretchko of HipHopDX wrote: "while One for the Road's primarily down-tempo beats help showcase Devin's latest twist in subject matter, they also put too much of the album's focus on his lyrics, lacking the kind of complexity (or heavy bass) that would win over some fans before his raps even began. The result is an album filled with the type of laid-back, lackluster production suited for a long drive on the open road".

In his mixed review for Iowa State Daily, Timothy Goldrick noted the "production is less than desirable throughout the album. Loud synthesizers overshadow many songs, while others are messy and rushed", he continued: "for Devin the Dude's reincarnation to be as successful as planned, he could have gone with some nice relaxed West-coast beats, but instead he tried to hit the home run. Devin has songs that function well on their own, but the lack of cohesion is still evident".

== Track listing ==
No.	Title	Writer(s)	Producer(s)	Length
1.	"I'm Just Getting Blowed"	Devin Copeland; Chris Whitacre; Justin Henderson	Tha Bizness	4:25
2.	"Fresh Air" (featuring Rum and DNA)	Copeland; Rodney Spencer; Gary Brown; Jose Ignacio Gorbea	Jose Ignacio Gorbea	4:01
3.	"Livin' This Life" (featuring Angela Williams)	Copeland; Angela Camille Williams; Charles Henderson	Chuck Heat	4:18
4.	"Stop Waiting"	Copeland; Michael Poye; William Beck; Leroy Bonner; Marshall Jones; Ralph Middlebrooks; Marvin Pierce; Clarence Satchell; James Williams	Domo	4:12
5.	"Reach for It" (featuring Snap)	Copeland; Charles Fields; Corey Sullivan	C-Ray Sullivan	3:58
6.	"Probably Should Have"	Copeland; Thomas Knudsen	Thomas Knudsen; Even Brenna	3:58
7.	"Your Favorite Radio Station (Skit 1)"			3:01
8.	"Hear the Sound"	Copeland; Robert McQueen III	Rob Quest; DJ Styles	4:52
9.	"Rearview" (featuring Shun Ward and Kidricc James)	Copeland; Christopher Deshun; Christian Davis; Garrett Brown; Stephan Townsend	Garrett Brown	3:16
10.	"One for the Road"	Copeland; Albert Antonio Dickson; Paul Tisdale	Albie Dickson; Chinky P	3:29
11.	"I Hope We Don't Get Too Drunk" (performed by Odd Squad)	Copeland; McQueen III; Dexter Johnson	Devin the Dude	4:49
12.	"Your Favorite Radio Station (Skit 2)"			1:28
13.	"Please Don't Smoke No Cheese"	Copeland; Reggie Coby	Reggie Coby	3:04
14.	"Herb the Nation"	Copeland; Vincent John Martin; Alison Jane Moyet	Devin the Dude	4:10
15.	"Your Favorite Radio Station (Skit 3)"	Copeland		1:44
Total length:				54:45

Sample credits

- Track 4 contains a sample from "The Big Score" written by William Beck, Leroy Bonner, Marshall Jones, Ralph Middlebrooks, Marvin Pierce, Clarence Satchell and James Williams and performed by the Ohio Players.
- Track 14 contains a sample from "Situation" written by Vincent John Martin and Alison Jane Moyet and performed by Yaz(oo).

== Personnel ==
- Devin "The Dude" Copeland – vocals, producer (tracks: 11, 14), recording & arranging (tracks: 7, 12, 15), mixing, executive producer
- Rodney "Rum" Spencer – vocals (track 2)
- Gary "DNA" Brown – vocals (track 2)
- Angela Camille Williams – vocals (track 3)
- Charles "Snap" Fields – vocals (track 5)
- Christopher "Shun Ward" Deshun – vocals (track 9)
- Christian "Kidricc James" Davis – vocals (track 9)
- Robert "Rob Quest" McQueen – vocals (track 11), producer (track 8)
- Dexter "Jugg Mugg" Johnson – vocals (track 11), additional vocals (track 15)
- Luster "Tony-Mac" Tone – additional vocals (track 10)
- Rahsan "Tre" Ellison – soprano vocals (track 15)
- Whiteboy Wagg – additional guitar (track 2)
- Chris "Dow Jones" Whitacre – producer (track 1)
- Justin "Henny" Henderson – producer (track 1)
- Jose Ignacio Gorbea – producer (track 2)
- Charles "Chuck Heat" Henderson – producer (track 3)
- Michael "Domo" Poye – producer (track 4)
- Corey "C-Ray" Sullivan – producer (track 5)
- Thomas Knudsen – producer (track 6)
- Even Brenna – producer (track 6)
- Carlos "DJ Styles" Garza – producer (track 8)
- Garrett Brown – producer & mixing (track 9)
- Albert "Albie" Dickson – producer (track 10)
- Paul "Chinky P" Tisdale – producer (track 10)
- Reggie Coby – producer (track 13)
- Stephan "Steve-O" Townsend – mixing assistant
- James Hoover – mastering
- Oscar Zambrano – mastering (track 9)
- Joseph Chachere – photography
- Chad McClain – photography assistant
- Andrew Kelley – cover design

== Charts ==
Chart (2013)	Peak position
US Top Current Album Sales (Billboard)	198
US Top R&B/Hip-Hop Albums (Billboard)	36
US Top Rap Albums (Billboard)	21
