= Da Hood (album) =

Studio album by Menace Clan
- Released: October 10, 1995
- Recorded: 1994–1995
- Genre: Hip-hop
- Label: Rap-A-Lot
- Producers: "Big Jess" Willard; Dante "Dee" Miller; Freddie Young; John "Swift" Catalon; Michael Banks; Mike Dean; N.O. Joe; Scarface

Singles from Da Hood
- 1. "Da Hood" Released: 1995

Professional ratings
Review scores
Source	Rating
AllMusic	3/5 stars
RapReviews	6/10

Da Hood is the only studio album by American hip-hop duo Menace Clan. It was released on October 10, 1995, through Rap-A-Lot Records. Production was handled by N.O. Joe, "Big Jess" Willard, Mike Dean, Scarface, Freddie Young, John "Swift" Catalon, Michael Banks, and member Dante "Dee" Miller. It features guest appearances from Bushwick Bill.

The album did not reach the Billboard 200, however, it debuted at number 44 on the Top R&B Albums and number 33 on the Heatseekers Albums in the United States. Its lead single, "Da Hood" b/w "What You Say", with accompanying music videos, was not charted on the Billboard.

== Track listing ==
No.	Title	Writer(s)	Producer(s)	Length
1.	"Aggravated Mayheim"	Dante L. Miller; Walter Adams; Jess Willard	Big Jess	3:08
2.	"Mad Nigga"	Miller; Adams; Joseph Johnson	N.O. Joe	4:17
3.	"Fuck a Record Deal"	Miller; Adams; Brad Jordan	Scarface	3:15
4.	"Life"	Miller; Adams; Johnson	N.O. Joe	4:44
5.	"Runaway Slave"	Miller; Adams; Jon Catalon	John "Swift" Catalon	5:25
6.	"Da Hood" (featuring Bushwick Bill)	Miller; Adams	Dee	4:42
7.	"Fuck What You Say"	Miller; Adams; Jordan	Scarface	4:02
8.	"Da Bullet"	Miller; Adams; Michael Dean	Dee; Mike Dean	3:45
9.	"Cold World"	Miller; Adams; Johnson	N.O. Joe	4:41
10.	"Me by Myself"	Miller; Freddie Young	Freddie Young	3:37
11.	"Have You Ever Heard" (featuring Bushwick Bill)	Miller; Adams; Dean	Mike Dean	3:56
12.	"Last Driveby"	Miller; Adams	Michael Banks	5:34
13.	"Kill Whitey"	Adams; Willard	Big Jess	2:49

== Personnel ==
- Dante L. "Dee" Miller – vocals (tracks: 1–12), producer (tracks: 6, 8)
- Walter H. "Assassin" Adams – vocals (tracks: 1–9, 11–13)
- Richard "Bushwick Bill" Shaw – vocals (tracks: 6, 11)
- "Big Jess" Willard – producer (tracks: 1, 13)
- Joseph "N.O. Joe" Johnson – producer (tracks: 2, 4, 9)
- Brad "Scarface" Jordan – producer (tracks: 3, 7)
- John "Swift" Catalon – producer (track 5)
- Mike Dean – producer (tracks: 8, 11), mixing, engineering
- Freddie Young – producer (track 10)
- Michael Banks – producer (track 12)
- "Jazzy Jeff" Griffin – mixing
- Andre "007" Barnes – assistant engineering
- Anthony Valcic – mastering
- Steve McCarter – executive producer
- James "J. Prince" Smith – executive producer

== Charts ==
Chart (1995)	Peak position
US Top R&B Albums (Billboard)	44
US Heatseekers Albums (Billboard)	33
