= My Testimony of Redemption =

Studio album by Bushwick Bill
- Released: November 17, 2009
- Genre: Christian hip hop
- Length: 67:59
- Label: Much Luvv Recordz
- Producer: G-SPOT Productionz

Bushwick Bill chronology
Gutta Mixx (2005)	My Testimony of Redemption (2009)

Professional ratings
Review scores
Source	Rating
AllMusic	3/5 stars

My Testimony of Redemption is the sixth and final studio album by rapper Bushwick Bill released on November 17, 2009.

The album is a departure from the hardcore horrorcore and gangster rap themes of his previous solo albums and work with The Geto Boys, instead emphasizing autobiographical lyrics about Bushwick Bill's conversion to Christianity. It is his only work that did not get a Parental Advisory label.

== Track listing ==
1. "Intro"
2. "Takin' It Back"
3. "Testimony of Redemption"
4. "Goin' to the River" (feat. Von Won)
5. "Calling to You" (feat. Bruce Bang)
6. "God's Side Is the Best Side"
7. "Praise of a Good Woman"
8. "Praise God for You" (feat. Bruce Bang)
9. "Guardian Angel" (feat. Mississippi Boys)
10. "Know What You Might Think" (feat. Von Won, Icece and Ras)
11. "God Heals the Pain" (feat. Von Won)
12. "Thorn in My Side" (feat. Bless'T and Tre9)
13. "Life Is a Beautiful Struggle" (feat. S.O.M.)
14. "Spiritual Warfare"
15. "Work It Out" (feat. AFC and Gifted Da Flamethrowa)
16. "No More Child's Play" (feat. Atonement)
17. "Renewed Mind"
18. "Takin' It Back (Remix)"

== Reception ==
Critic Alex Henderson of AllMusic described the album as an "uneven" departure from Bushwick Bill's violent and sexually explicit earlier work, but saved in part by an emphasis on introspective lyrics that examine his troubled life.
