= Landing Gear =

Studio album by Devin the Dude
- Released: October 7, 2008
- Studio: The Coughee Pot (Houston, TX)
- Genre: Hip-hop
- Length: 47:04
- Label: Razor & Tie
- Producer: Chuck Heat; Cozmo; C-Ray Sullivan; Destrukshon; Devin the Dude; D. Hatter; Domo; D. Washington; Luster Baker; Rob Quest; Rockstar

Devin the Dude chronology
Hi Life (2008)	Landing Gear (2008)	Suite 420 (2010)

Landing Gear is the sixth solo studio album by American rapper Devin the Dude. It was released on October 7, 2008, via Razor & Tie. Recording sessions took place at the Coughee Pot in Houston. Production was handled by Rockstar, Cozmo, Domo, C-Ray Sullivan, Destrukshon, D. Hatter, D. Washington, Chuck Heat, Luster Baker, Rob Quest, and Devin himself. It features guest appearances from 14K, Dee-Rail, G Monee, Joseph Edwards Jr., L.C., Snoop Dogg, Tony Mack and Young Malice. The album peaked at number 47 on the Billboard 200, number 9 on the Top R&B/Hip-Hop Albums and number 5 on the Top Rap Albums in the United States.

== Critical reception ==
Professional ratings
Aggregate scores
Source	Rating
Metacritic	68/100
Review scores
Source	Rating
AllMusic	4/5 stars
HipHopDX	3.5/5
RapReviews	8/10
Robert Christgau	(choice cut)
Spin	3.5/5 stars
The Austin Chronicle	2/5 stars
The A.V. Club	C+
XXL	3/5

Landing Gear was met with generally favorable reviews from music critics. At Metacritic, which assigns a normalized rating out of 100 to reviews from mainstream publications, the album received an average score of 68, based on six reviews.

AllMusic's David Jeffries wrote: "Devin's target audience, on the other hand, embraces sleaze, porno, weed, and hip-hop with plenty of memorable stingers, and seeing as how Landing Gear delivers on all counts, fans of Texas' most blunted rapper will once again be pleased". Steve 'Flash' Juon of RapReviews wrote: "it's fair to say that if there's one criticism of Devin that can truly stick it's that he takes the "Dude" aspect of his personality very seriously, and in few songs will you see him regard women as more than just objects of his sexual conquest. Nonetheless, songs like 'Me, You' show he can still charm a girl or two". David Peisner of Spin resumed: "none of this will make Devin a star anytime soon, but that's less his fault than it is everyone else's".

In mixed reviews, Nathan Rabin of The A.V. Club found "Devin's singsong flow remains hypnotic, and his silky, seductive croon can make a dis feel like a kiss, but this time, it's in service to forgettable songs unworthy of his singular talent". Chase Hoffberger of The Austin Chronicle stated: "those slinky, drip-dropping beats and lyrical offerings trapped in a triumvirate of weed, women, and--somehow equally--coffee will leave nonindulgers thinking LG's a bit repetitive".

== Track listing ==
No.	Title	Writer(s)	Producer(s)	Length
1.	"In My Draws"	Devin Copeland; Martin Sponnich	Rockstar	4:24
2.	"I Can't Make It Home" (featuring L.C.)	Copeland; Cozmo Hickox	Cozmo	3:37
3.	"Thinkin' Boutchu"	Copeland; Michael Poye	Domo	3:33
4.	"Let Me Know It's Real"	Copeland	C-Ray Sullivan	4:20
5.	"El Grande Nalgas"	Copeland; Corey Sullivan	C-Ray Sullivan	3:14
6.	"Me, You"	Copeland; Larry A. Towns Jr.	Destrukshon	3:57
7.	"Highway" (featuring Dee-Rail)	Copeland	Rockstar	3:16
8.	"I Don't Chase 'Em" (featuring Snoop Dogg and Tony Mack)	Copeland; Calvin Broadus	Devin the Dude	4:38
9.	"Yo Mind" (featuring G Monee and Young Malice)	Copeland; Garey Tally; Rodney Sutton	D. Hatter; D. Washington	3:10
10.	"I Need a Song" (featuring 14K)	Copeland; Brandon Harris; Kyle White	Luster Baker	4:20
11.	"Your Kinda Love" (featuring Joseph Edwards Jr.)	Copeland; Joseph Edwards Jr.; Charles Henderson	Chuck Heat	4:01
12.	"Stray"	Copeland; Robert McQueen	Rob Quest; Devin the Dude (co.)	4:34
Total length:				47:04

== Personnel ==
- Devin "The Dude" Copeland – vocals, producer (track 8), co-producer (track 12), engineering, executive producer
- Luster "Tony Mack" Tone – additional vocals (tracks: 1, 4), vocals (track 8)
- L.C. – vocals (track 2)
- Dee-Rail – vocals (track 7)
- Calvin "Snoop Dogg" Broadus – vocals (track 8)
- Garey "G Monee" Tally – vocals (track 9)
- Rodney "Young Malice" Sutton – vocals (track 9)
- Brandon Harris – vocals (track 10)
- Kyle "Quad" White – vocals (track 10)
- Joseph Edwards Jr. – vocals (track 11)
- Loni – additional vocals (track 1)
- Larry A. "Destrukshon" Towns Jr. – additional vocals (track 4), producer (track 6)
- Charles "Chuck Heat" Henderson – backing vocals & producer (track 11)
- Oonoe Blass – talkbox (track 1)
- Guitar Rob – guitar (track 5)
- Casey Kimble – guitar (track 12)
- Maximillian – keyboards (track 12)
- Martin "Rockstar" Sponnich – producer (tracks: 1, 7)
- Cozmo Hickox – producer (track 2)
- Michael "Domo" Poye – producer (track 3)
- Corey "C-Ray" Sullivan – producer (tracks: 4, 5)
- D. Hatter – producer (track 9)
- D. Washington – producer (track 9)
- Troy "Pee Wee" Clark – arranger (track 10), engineering
- Luster Baker – producer (track 10)
- Robert "Rob Quest" McQueen – producer (track 12)
- Dexter "Jugg Mugg" Johnson – engineering
- Brandon Kilgour – additional engineering
- Robert S. Brown – mixing
- Eddy Schreyer – mastering
- Jennifer McDaniels – executive producer
- Jon Shapiro – executive producer
- Matthew Pantoja – art direction, design
- Samantha "Giftd" Edwards – art direction, design
- Shane Nash – photography

== Charts ==
Chart (2008)	Peak position
US Billboard 200	47
US Top R&B/Hip-Hop Albums (Billboard)	9
US Top Rap Albums (Billboard)	5
