= The Points (song) =

1995 single by various artists

Single by The Notorious B.I.G., Coolio, Doodlebug, Big Mike, Buckshot, Redman, Ill Al Skratch, Heltah Skeltah, Bone Thugs-n-Harmony, Busta Rhymes, Menace Clan and Jamal

from the album Panther (The Original Motion Picture Soundtrack)
- Released: May 20, 1995
- Studio: Blue Palm Studios (California)
- Genre: Hip hop
- Length: 4:54 (album version)
- Label: Mercury
- Songwriter: Various
- Producers: Easy Mo Bee (Easy's Points), DJ U-Neek (U-Neek's Points), Mista Lawnge (Mista Lawnge's Points)

The Notorious B.I.G. singles chronology
"Can't You See" (1995)	"The Points" (1995)	"Player's Anthem" (1995)

Coolio singles chronology
"Mama I'm in Love wit' a Gangsta" (1994)	"The Points" (1995)	"Gangsta's Paradise" (1995)

Redman singles chronology
"Where Am I?" (1995)	"The Points" (1995)	"How High" (1995)

Busta Rhymes singles chronology
"Come wit da Git Down (Buckwild Remix)" (1994)	"The Points" (1995)	"Woo-Hah!! Got You All in Check" (1996)

Bone Thugs-n-Harmony singles chronology
"Foe tha Love of $" (1995)	"The Points" (1995)	"1st of tha Month" (1995)

Music video
- "The Points" on YouTube

"The Points" is a rap song performed by the Notorious B.I.G., Coolio, Doodlebug, Big Mike, Buckshot, Redman, Ill Al Skratch, Heltah Skeltah, Bone Thugs-n-Harmony, Shatasha Williams, Busta Rhymes, Menace Clan, and Jamal. It was released in 1995 via Mercury Records/PolyGram as a single from Panther (The Original Motion Picture Soundtrack). The song peaked at No. 80 on the Billboard Hot R&B/Hip-Hop Singles & Tracks chart.

== Contributing artists ==
In order of appearance on the song's album version:

- The Notorious B.I.G.
- Coolio
- Doodlebug of the Digable Planets
- Big Mike
- Buckshot
- Redman
- Ill Al Skratch
- Rock of Heltah Skeltah
- Bone Thugs-n-Harmony
- Busta Rhymes
- Menace Clan / 5th Ward Boyz ^{+}
- Jamal

All explicit versions from "The Points" single contain additional verses from Doodlebug, Heltah Skeltah, Menace Clan, and Jamal. U-Neek's "Points" features 5th Ward Boyz and vocals from Shatasha Williams.

== Track listing ==
Side 1

1. "U-Neek's Points" (dirty) - 8:55 (DJ U-Neek)
2. "Easy's Points" (dirty) - 9:09 (Easy Mo Bee)

Side 2

1. "Mista Lawnge's Points" (dirty) - 5:02 (Mista Lawnge of Black Sheep)
2. "U-Neek's Points" (clean) - 5:09 (DJ U-Neek)
3. "Easy's Points" (clean) - 6:40 (Easy Mo Bee)

== Charts ==
Chart (1995)	Peak position
US Billboard Hot R&B/Hip-Hop Singles & Tracks	80
