= No Surrender... No Retreat (album) =

No Surrender…No Retreat

Studio album by Bushwick Bill
- Released: October 27, 1998
- Recorded: 1998
- Genre: Horrorcore; hardcore hip hop
- Length: 1:07:39
- Label: Wrap Records
- Producer: Bushwick Bill

Bushwick Bill chronology
Phantom of the Rapra (1995)	No Surrender…No Retreat (1998)	Universal Small Souljah (2001)

Professional ratings
Review scores
Source	Rating
AllMusic	2.5/5 stars
RapReviews	5/10

No Surrender...No Retreat is the third solo studio album by American rapper Bushwick Bill. It was released on October 27, 1998, through Wrap Records with distribution via Ichiban Records. Production was handled by Clarence Jackson, Tim Hill, Glenn Jeffrey, Ken Crossley, and Bushwick Bill himself, who also served as executive producer. It features guest appearances from of D-Ology, Snap and Tabu of the Niyat, Kyhil, Kaos, Nate G., All D. Freeman, BBA, Black Bac Doe, Menace Clan's Dante Miller, Low Key, Q-Dog, Silky Goldez and Tyfeen. The album did not reach the Billboard 200, however, it made it to number 84 on the Top R&B/Hip-Hop Albums chart in the United States.

The album is dedicated to Gil Epstein, a Fort Bend County prosecutor and friend who was gunned down in 1996, two years before the album's release.

== Track listing ==
No.	Title	Writer(s)	Producer(s)	Length
1.	"Intro"	Richard Stephen Shaw; Kyhil; Kenneth Crossley	Bushwick Bill; Tim Hill	1:55
2.	"5 Element Combat" (featuring D-Ology, Snap and Tabu)	Shaw; D. King; Charles Fields; Tabu; Kyhil	Bushwick Bill; Tim Hill	5:36
3.	"2 Hard 2 Test"	Shaw	Bushwick Bill; Tim Hill	4:06
4.	"In My Hood" (featuring Ken Crossley)	Crossley	Ken Crossley; Glenn Jeffrey; Bushwick Bill^{[c]}; Tim Hill^{[c]}	4:38
5.	"My Bitch" (featuring Kaos and Kyhil)	Shaw; Kaos; Kyhil	Bushwick Bill; Tim Hill	5:00
6.	"All D. Freeman" (featuring All D. Freeman)	All D. Freeman		1:12
7.	"Hood Rat" (featuring Silky Goldez)	Shaw; Silky Goldez; Kyhil	Bushwick Bill; Tim Hill	5:10
8.	"P-Funk"	Shaw	Bushwick Bill	4:01
9.	"Don't Be Afraid" (featuring Nate G.)	Shaw; Nate G.	Bushwick Bill; Clarence Jackson	3:19
10.	"Tragedy" (featuring Dee)	Shaw; Dante Miller	Bushwick Bill; Tim Hill	3:15
11.	"Let da Rain Come Down" (featuring Tyfeen)	Shaw; Tyfeen	Bushwick Bill; Tim Hill	3:25
12.	"Who's the Mack?"	Shaw	Bushwick Bill	4:37
13.	"Kaos Cidity" (featuring Kaos and Kyhil)	Shaw; Kaos	Bushwick Bill; Tim Hill	3:38
14.	"Gangsta Funk"	Shaw; Clarence Jackson	Bushwick Bill; Clarence Jackson	2:27
15.	"SA Fools" (featuring BBA and Q-Dog)	Shaw; BBA; Q-Dog	Bushwick Bill; Tim Hill	3:37
16.	"3 Hard Headz" (featuring Black Bac Doe and Low Key)	Shaw; Black Bac Doe; Thomas Andre McCollum	Bushwick Bill; Tim Hill	2:53
17.	"Let's Give Love Another Try" (featuring Nate G.)	Shaw; Nate G.	Bushwick Bill; Clarence Jackson	2:03
18.	"Stand by Me" (featuring Kyhil)	Shaw; Kyhil	Bushwick Bill	4:49
19.	"Outro"	Shaw	Bushwick Bill; Tim Hill	1:58
Total length:				1:07:39

Notes

- ^{^[c]} signifies a co-producer.

== Personnel ==
- Richard "Bushwick Bill" Shaw – vocals & producer (tracks: 1–3, 5, 7–19), co-producer (track 4), engineering, mastering, executive producer
- D. "D-Ology" King – vocals (track 2)
- Charles "Snap" Fields – vocals (track 2)
- Tabu – vocals (track 2)
- Kenneth Crossley – vocals & producer (track 4)
- Kaos – vocals (tracks: 5, 13)
- Kyhil – vocals (tracks: 5, 13, 18)
- All D. Freeman – vocals (track 6)
- Silky Goldez – vocals (track 7)
- Nate G. – vocals (tracks: 9, 17)
- Dante "Dee" Miller – vocals (track 10)
- Tyfeen – vocals (track 11)
- BBA – vocals (track 15)
- Q-Dog – vocals (track 15)
- Thomas "Low Key" McCollum – vocals (track 16)
- Black Bac Doe – vocals (track 16)
- Ron Wilson – lead guitar, 5-string bass
- Dre – guitar
- Rich – guitar
- Tim Hill – keyboards, synth bass, drum programming, producer (tracks: 1–3, 5, 7, 10, 11, 13, 15, 16, 19), co-producer (track 4)
- Ed Thompson – drums, percussion
- Damon Sonnier – alto saxophone, tenor saxophone
- Derek Sonnier – trumpet
- Percy Person – engineering
- Daniel Kresco – additional engineering
- Tommy Dorsey – editing, mastering

== Charts ==
Chart (1998)	Peak position
US Top R&B/Hip-Hop Albums (Billboard)	84
