= Gangsta Funk =

Studio album by 5th Ward Boyz
- Released: February 22, 1994
- Recorded: 1993–1994
- Studios: Digital Services (Houston, TX)
- Genre: Hip-hop
- Labels: Underground; Rap-A-Lot
- Producers: 5th Ward Boyz; John Bido; Mike Dean; N.O. Joe; O.G. Dewey

5th Ward Boyz chronology
Ghetto Dope (1993)	Gangsta Funk (1994)	Rated G (1995)

Professional ratings
Review scores
Source	Rating
AllMusic	3/5 stars

Gangsta Funk is the second studio album by American hip-hop trio the 5th Ward Boyz. It was released in 1994 via Underground/Rap-A-Lot Records. Recording sessions took place at Digital Services in Houston. Production was handled by Mike Dean, N.O. Joe, O.G. Dewey, John Bido, and 5th Ward Boyz themselves. The album peaked at number 105 on the Billboard 200 and number 13 on the Top R&B/Hip-Hop Albums charts in the United States, becoming the group's highest charting album.

The songs "Ghetto Curse Words" and "Same Ol'" appeared on the 5th Ward Boyz' previous album, Ghetto Dope.

== Track listing ==
No.	Title	Producer(s)	Length
1.	"Once Again It's On"	O.G. Dewey; 5th Ward Boyz; Mike Dean	4:33
2.	"Lo Life in the Street"	O.G. Dewey; Mike Dean	4:29
3.	"Gangsta Funk"	N.O. Joe	4:34
4.	"Ghetto Curse Words"	Mike Dean; John Bido	2:09
5.	"Underground G's"	N.O. Joe	6:45
6.	"Same Ol'"	N.O. Joe	3:11
7.	"Reason"	N.O. Joe	5:03
8.	"Funk (Outro)"	N.O. Joe; Mike Dean	4:08

== Charts ==
Chart (1994)	Peak position
US Billboard 200	105
US Top R&B/Hip-Hop Albums (Billboard)	13
