= Gutta Mixx =

Gutta Mix

Studio album by Bushwick Bill
- Released: March 29, 2005
- Recorded: 2004–2005
- Genre: Gangsta rap
- Label: Lightyear Entertainment

Bushwick Bill chronology
Universal Small Souljah (2001)	Gutta Mix (2005)	My Testimony of Redemption (2009)

Professional ratings
Review scores
Source	Rating
AllMusic	3/5 stars

Gutta Mixx is the fifth solo studio album by rapper Bushwick Bill, released in 2005 through Lightyear Entertainment. It is his final solo studio album to contain explicit lyrics.

== Track listing ==
1. "Drwahbushwickching"
2. "Keepemsingn"
3. "Vonwolfgangdonchucknice"
4. "20minutesormore"
5. "Farenheit9one1"
6. "Willbushwick"
7. "Milleniumpimpwick"
8. "Recklessendangerment"
9. "Damn If I Let It Be"
10. "Feelmyheart"
11. "Dowhatyoudo"
12. "Phantomchuckopera"
13. "Gorealaentertainment"
14. "Milleniumpimpnscrewed"
15. "20minutesormore (Soul Mix)"
