= Waitin' to Inhale =

Studio album by Devin the Dude
- Released: March 20, 2007
- Studios: The Coughee Pot; Studio 7303; Dean's List House of Hits (Houston, TX)
- Genre: Hip-hop
- Length: 67:10
- Labels: Rap-A-Lot 4 Life; Asylum
- Producers: J. Prince (exec.); Chuck Heat; Davey D; Devin the Dude; Domo; Mike Dean; Picnic Tyme; Rob Quest; Sendar

Devin the Dude chronology
To tha X-Treme (2004)	Waitin' to Inhale (2007)	Waitin Our Turn (2007)

Professional ratings
Review scores
Source	Rating
AllHipHop	4/5 stars
AllMusic	4/5 stars
HipHopDX	4/5
Pitchfork	7.8/10
RapReviews	8/10
The A.V. Club	A−
XXL	3/5 (L)

Waitin' to Inhale is the fourth solo studio album by American rapper Devin the Dude. It was released on March 20, 2007, through Rap-A-Lot Records, making it his final record for the label. Recording sessions took place at The Coughee Pot, Studio 7303 and Dean's List House of Hits in Houston. Production was handled by Domo, Chuck Heat, Mike Dean, Sendar, Davey D, Picnic Tyme, Rob Quest, and Devin himself. It features guest appearances from the Coughee Brothaz, André 3000, Bun B, Lil Wayne and Snoop Dogg.

The album peaked at number 30 on the Billboard 200 in the United States, making this his highest charting album to date.

== Track listing ==
No.	Title	Writer(s)	Producer(s)	Length
1.	"Boom I"			0:58
2.	"She Wants That Money" (performed by Odd Squad)	Devin Copeland; Michael Poye	Domo	4:52
3.	"Almighty Dollar"	Copeland; Richard Escobedo	Picnic Tyme	4:09
4.	"I Hope I Don't Get Sick-a-This"	Copeland; Charles Henderson	Chuck Heat	3:49
5.	"What a Job" (featuring Snoop Dogg and André 3000)	Copeland; Calvin Broadus; André Benjamin; Henderson	Chuck Heat	5:32
6.	"Broccoli & Cheese"	Copeland; Poye	Domo	3:59
7.	"Boom II"			0:56
8.	"She Useta Be"	Copeland; Poye; Marvin Gaye	Domo; Ben Diggin (co.)	4:57
9.	"Lil' Girl Gone" (featuring Lil' Wayne and Bun B)	Copeland; Dwayne Carter; Bernard Freeman; James McKinley Horton	Devin the Dude	5:15
10.	"No Longer Needed Here"	Copeland; Poye	Domo; Devin the Dude	5:09
11.	"Just Because"	Copeland; Davey Cohn; James Todd Smith; Darryl Pierce; Dwayne Simon; Bobby Ervin; Steve Ettinger	Davey D	3:45
12.	"Don't Wanna Be Alone"	Copeland; Poye; James Williams; Clarence Satchell; Leroy Bonner; Marshall Jones; Ralph Middlebrooks; Marvin Pierce; William Beck	Domo	5:31
13.	"Somebody Else's Wife" (featuring 14K)	Copeland; Poye	Domo; Devin the Dude	4:17
14.	"Boom III"			0:29
15.	"Cutcha' Up"	Copeland; Sander Smit; Michael Dean	Sendar; Mike Dean	3:31
16.	"Nothin' to Roll With"	Copeland; Smit; Dean	Sendar; Mike Dean	2:03
17.	"Til It's All Gone" (performed by Odd Squad)	Copeland; Dexter Johnson; Robert McQueen	Rob Quest	7:58
Total length:				1:07:10

Sample credits

- Track 6 contains an interpolation of "Forever Mine" performed by The O'Jays.
- Track 8 contains a sample of "Latin Reaction" performed by Gato Barbieri.
- Track 9 contains a sample of "Diana" performed by Eugene Wilde.
- Track 11 contains an interpolation of "I Need Love" performed by LL Cool J.
- Track 12 contains a sample of "Alone" performed by the Ohio Players.

== Personnel ==
- Devin "The Dude" Copeland – vocals, producer (tracks: 9, 10, 13)
- Dexter "Jugg Mugg" Johnson – vocals (tracks: 2, 17)
- Luster "Tony Mack" Tone – additional vocals (tracks: 2, 3, 9, 12)
- Calvin "Snoop Dogg" Broadus – vocals (track 5)
- Andre "André 3000" Benjamin – vocals (track 5)
- Dwayne "Lil' Wayne" Carter – vocals (track 9)
- Bernard "Bun B" Freeman – vocals (track 9)
- Coughee Brotha D-Loc – additional vocals (track 12)
- Brandon Harris – vocals (track 13)
- Kyle "Quad" White – vocals (track 13)
- Robert "Rob Quest" McQueen – vocals & producer (track 17)
- Carlos Fumero – guitar (track 6)
- Anthony Nicholson – bass (track 9)
- Corey "Funkafangaz" Stoot – guitar & bass (track 10)
- Elliott Dixon – saxophone (track 11)
- Michael "Domo" Poye – producer (tracks: 2, 6, 8, 10, 12, 13), engineering
- Richard "Picnic Tyme" Escobedo – producer (track 3)
- Charles "Chuck Heat" Henderson – producer (tracks: 4, 5)
- Davey D. Cohn – producer (track 11)
- Mike Dean – producer (tracks: 15, 16), engineering, mixing, mastering
- Sander "Sendar" Smit – producer (tracks: 15, 16)
- Ben Diggin – co-producer (track 8)
- Marq Moody – engineering
- James "J Prince" Smith – executive producer
- Joey Castillo Jr. – art direction, design
- Tiny – art direction, design
- Jack Thompson – photography

== Charts ==
=== Weekly charts ===
Chart (2007)	Peak position
US Billboard 200	30
US Top R&B/Hip-Hop Albums (Billboard)	9

=== Year-end charts ===
Chart (2007)	Position
US Top R&B/Hip-Hop Albums (Billboard)	97
