= Phantom of the Rapra =

Studio album by Bushwick Bill
- Released: July 11, 1995
- Recorded: 1994–95
- Studios: Lil J's Studio (Houston, Texas)
- Genres: Southern hip hop; gangsta rap; horrorcore; g-funk
- Length: 44:04
- Label: Rap-A-Lot Records
- Producers: J. Prince (exec.); Mike Dean; John Bido; MAD; CJ Mac; John "Swift" Catalon; Freddie Young

Bushwick Bill chronology
Little Big Man (1992)	Phantom of the Rapra (1995)	No Surrender...No Retreat (1998)

Professional ratings
Review scores
Source	Rating
AllMusic	4.5/5 stars
Muzik	1/5 stars
RapReviews	8/10
Q	4/5 stars

Phantom of the Rapra is the second solo studio album by American rapper Bushwick Bill. It was released on July 11, 1995, through Rap-A-Lot Records with distribution via Noo Trybe Records. Recording sessions took place at Lil J's Studio in Houston. Production was handled by Mike Dean, John Bido, Clement Burnette, John "Swift" Catalon, CJ Mac and Freddie Young with executive producer J. Prince. It features guest appearances from 3D, CJ Mac, Menace Clan and Sherm.

The album peaked at number 43 on the Billboard 200 albums chart in the United States.

== Track listing ==
No.	Title	Producer(s)	Length
1.	"Phantom's Theme"	Mike Dean; John Bido	1:06
2.	"Wha Cha Gonna Do?"	Mike Dean; John Bido	4:08
3.	"Time Is Hard"	Clement "Mad" Burnette	4:17
4.	"Who's the Biggest" (featuring CJ Mac)	Clement "Mad" Burnette; CJ Mac	3:53
5.	"Ex-Girlfriend"	Mike Dean; John Bido	4:54
6.	"Only God Knows"	Clement "Mad" Burnette; CJ Mac	4:05
7.	"Already Dead"	John "Swift" Catalon	4:21
8.	"The Bushwicken"	Mike Dean; John Bido	4:07
9.	"Subliminal Criminal" (featuring Sherm)	Mike Dean	3:31
10.	"Inhale Exhale" (featuring Menace Clan)	John "Swift" Catalon	3:58
11.	"Mr. President" (featuring 3D of RAG)	Freddie Young	4:27
12.	"Phantom's Reprise"	Mike Dean; John Bido	1:17
Total length:			44:04

Sample credits

- "Only God Knows" – "Walk On By" by Isaac Hayes
- "Times Is Hard" – "I Found Love (When I Found You)" by The Spinners
- "Wha Cha Gonna Do?" – "Bridge of Sighs" by Robin Trower

== Personnel ==
- Bushwick Bill – main artist, coordinator
- Dante L. Miller – featured artist (track 10)
- 3D – featured artist (track 11)
- Sherm – featured artist (track 9)
- Menace Clan – featured artists (track 10)
- Bryaan Ross – additional vocals (tracks: 4–6), producer (tracks: 4, 6)
- John Okuribido – producer (tracks: 1, 2, 5, 8, 12), mixing, coordinator
- Michael George Dean – producer (tracks: 1, 2, 5, 8, 9, 12), engineering, mixing
- Clement "MAD" Burnette – producer (tracks: 3, 4, 6)
- John "Swift" Catalon – producer (tracks: 7, 10)
- Freddie Young – producer (track 11)
- James A. Smith – executive producer
- Dave Collins – mastering
- "Jazzy" Jeff Griffin – assistant mixing and engineering
- Troy "Pee Wee" Clark – assistant engineering
- Patricia Sullivan – assistant mastering
- Jason Clark – art direction, design
- Dré – art direction
- Tar – photography

== Charts ==
=== Weekly charts ===
Chart (1995)	Peak position
US Billboard 200	43
US Top R&B/Hip-Hop Albums (Billboard)	3

=== Year-end charts ===
Chart (1995)	Position
US Top R&B/Hip-Hop Albums (Billboard)	86
