= Universal Small Souljah =

Studio album by Bushwick Bill
- Released: March 13, 2001
- Studios: 2 Tone Producitons (Houston, TX)
- Genre: Hip-hop
- Length: 59:37
- Label: Nu Wave

Bushwick Bill chronology
No Surrender…No Retreat (1998)	Universal Small Souljah (2001)	Gutta Mixx (2005)

Singles from Universal Small Souljah
- 1. "Unforgiven" Released: 2000

Professional ratings
Review scores
Source	Rating
AllMusic	1.5/5 stars
RapReviews	4.5/10
The New Rolling Stone Album Guide	2/5 stars

Universal Small Souljah is the fourth solo studio album by American rapper Bushwick Bill. It was released on March 13, 2001 via Nu Wave Entertainment.

== Track listing ==
No.	Title	Length
1.	"Intro"	1:52
2.	"Sex on the Floor"	4:31
3.	"U Gonna Be My Bitch"	5:00
4.	"Money & Love"	3:15
5.	"That's Life"	3:14
6.	"Money Make Me Cum"	4:00
7.	"Bushmotherfuckingwick"	3:46
8.	"Like What"	3:19
9.	"When the Nite Falls"	4:44
10.	"Dr. Wolfs Gang"	4:13
11.	"Modern Day Play"	5:09
12.	"Coming With That Shit"	4:05
13.	"Cause I'm Here"	1:04
14.	"Groupie Bitches"	3:11
15.	"Make Love U & I"	1:16
16.	"Unforgiven"	3:31
17.	"Outro"	3:27
Total length:		59:37
