= Rated G =

Studio album by 5th Ward Boyz
- Released: November 28, 1995
- Recorded: 1994–95
- Studios: Hot Dog Studio (Houston, Texas); Digital Services (Houston, Texas)
- Genre: G-funk
- Length: 62:57
- Label: Rap-A-Lot
- Producers: 5th Ward Boyz; Derek "Grizz" Edwards; Mike Dean; Pimp C; Roger Tausz; Scarface

5th Ward Boyz chronology
| Gangsta Funk (1994) | Rated G (1995) | Usual Suspects (1997) |

Professional ratings
Review scores
| Source | Rating |
|---|---|
| AllMusic | 4.5/5 stars |

Rated G is the third studio album by the American hip hop trio 5th Ward Boyz. It was released on November 28, 1995, through Rap-A-Lot Records. Recording sessions took place at Hot Dog Studio and Digital Services in Houston. Production was handled by Mike Dean, Derek "Grizz" Edwards, Pimp C, Roger Tausz, Scarface and 5th Ward Boyz, with J Prince and O.G. Dewey serving as executive producers. It features guest appearances from 3D, 5th Ward Juvenilez, Flesh-n-Bone, Kaos, UGK and Wildchild.

The album peaked at 189 on the Billboard 200 and 35 on the Top R&B/Hip-Hop Albums, their lowest peak position on either chart. Despite the album's lack of commercial success, the album was met with positive reviews. AllMusic's Stephen Thomas Erlewine gave the album 4.5 stars out of a possible 5, saying "Rated G remains enjoyable. It is the work of talented, but not inspired, imitators and will do if The Chronic and Doggystyle are sounding stale".

== Track listing ==
| No. | Title | Writer(s) | Producer(s) | Length |
|---|---|---|---|---|
| 1. | "Dirty" | Andre Barnes; Eric Taylor; Richard Nash; Michael Dean | 5th Ward Boyz; Mike Dean | 4:44 |
| 2. | "Concrete Hell" | Barnes; Taylor; Nash; Dean; Edward Russell; Roger Tausz | 5th Ward Boyz; Mike Dean; Roger Tausz | 5:58 |
| 3. | "Wake Up" | | | 0:41 |
| 4. | "Situations" | Barnes; Taylor; Nash; Dean | 5th Ward Boyz; Mike Dean | 5:08 |
| 5. | "Fifth Ward" | Barnes; Taylor; Nash; Dean | Mike Dean | 4:43 |
| 6. | "The Streets" | Barnes; Dean | 007; Mike Dean | 3:49 |
| 7. | "My Life" | | | 1:17 |
| 8. | "Your Life" | Taylor; Dean | E-Rock; Mike Dean | 5:54 |
| 9. | "Death Is Calling" (featuring Flesh-n-Bone, 3D and Wildchild) | Barnes; Taylor; Nash | Scarface | 6:14 |
| 10. | "Raising Cain" | Nash; Barnes; Dean | Mike Dean; 007 | 5:24 |
| 11. | "Swing Wide" (featuring UGK) | Barnes; Taylor; Nash; Chad Butler; Bernard Freeman | Pimp C | 4:44 |
| 12. | "Busta Free" | Barnes; Taylor; Nash; Derek Edwards | Derek "Grizz" Edwards | 5:51 |
| 13. | "One Night Stand" | Barnes; Taylor; Nash; Dean | 5th Ward Boyz; Mike Dean | 3:50 |
| 14. | "Step into My Hood" (featuring 5th Ward Juvenilez, Gotti and Kaos) | Barnes; Taylor; Nash; Edwards | Derek "Grizz" Edwards | 4:54 |
| Total length: | | | | 1:02:57 |

== Personnel ==
- Andre "007" Barnes – vocals, producer (tracks: 1, 2, 4, 6, 10, 13), engineering & mixing assistant
- Eric "E-Rock" Taylor – vocals, producer (tracks: 1, 2, 4, 8, 13)
- Richard "Lo Life" Nash – vocals, producer (tracks: 1, 2, 4, 13)
- Mike Dean – producer (tracks: 1, 2, 4–6, 8, 10, 13), engineering, mixing
- Roger Tausz – producer (track 2)
- Brad "Scarface" Jordan – producer (track 9)
- Chad "Pimp C" Butler – vocals & producer (track 11)
- Derek "Grizz" Edwards – producer (tracks: 12, 14)
- Jeff Griffin – mixing assistant
- Anthony Valcic – mastering
- Dewey Forker – executive producer, production coordinator
- James "J. Prince" Smith – executive producer
- Edward "Spook" Russell – production coordinator, management
- Patrick Nixon – design, layout
- Stanley "Flesh-n-Bone" Howse – vocals (track 9)
- 3D – vocals (track 9)
- Wildchild – vocals (track 9)
- Bernard "Bun B" Freeman – vocals (track 11)
- Daddy Lo – vocals (track 14)
- Gotti – vocals (track 14)
- Kaos – vocals (track 14)
- Frank "Mr. Slimm" Robinson – vocals (track 14)
- Nickelboy – vocals (track 14)

== Charts ==
| Chart (1995) | Peak position |
|---|---|
| US Billboard 200 | 189 |
| US Top R&B/Hip-Hop Albums (Billboard) | 35 |
