= Suite 420 =

Studio album by Devin the Dude
- Released: April 20, 2010
- Genre: Hip hop
- Length: 55:31
- Label: E1 Music
- Producers: Big Baby; C-Ray Sullivan; Devin the Dude; Luster Baker; Midas; Mike Dean; Mirawge; Q-Stone; Reggie Coby; Rob Quest

Devin the Dude chronology
Landing Gear (2008)	Suite 420 (2010)	Gotta Be Me (2010)

Suite 420 is the seventh solo studio album by American rapper Devin the Dude. It was released on April 20, 2010, via E1 Music. Production was handled by Luster Baker, Big Baby, Mirawge, Rob Quest, C-Ray Sullivan, Midas, Mike Dean, Q-Stone, Reggie Coby, and Devin himself. It features guest appearances from the Coughee Brothaz, Alpha-Bet-D, Ced-B, Korey-B and Scool-Boy. The album peaked at number 88 on the Billboard 200, number 19 on the Top R&B/Hip-Hop Albums, number 9 on the Top Rap Albums and number 12 on the Independent Albums in the United States.

== Critical reception ==
Professional ratings
Aggregate scores
Source	Rating
Metacritic	57/100
Review scores
Source	Rating
AllMusic	3.5/5 stars
HipHopDX	4.5/5
Now	3/5 Ns
Pitchfork	5.3/10
RapReviews	8/10
Robert Christgau	(1-star Honorable Mention)
The A.V. Club	C

Suite #420 was met with mixed or average reviews from music critics. At Metacritic, which assigns a normalized rating out of 100 to reviews from mainstream publications, the album received an average score of 57, based on seven reviews.

AllMusic's David Jeffries wrote: "Devin's redundancy is the reason fans keep coming back. They won't be disappointed by Suite #420, which features the usual set of chilled-out weed anthems, sex jokes, and old-school R&B beats, along with those great oddball numbers the Dude uses to break each album up". In his final edition of Consumer Guide column for MSN Music, veteran critic Robert Christgau stated: "the weed rhymes he takes himself, the sex rhymes he farms out, which in the Dirty South is a sign of truly delicate sensibility", honourably mentioning tracks "All You Need", "Ultimate High" and "Twitta".

Jason Richards of Now found "Devin's single-mindedness makes for a highly unified style, and the album's relaxed, hazy production is the aural equivalent of comfort food. But the repetition is kinda tedious for an hour of straight listening". Tom Breihan of Pitchfork wrote: "it's good to hear him still recording, even if he's deeply entrenched himself in his own wheelhouse and barely has a single surprising moment in the album's whole hour. But if the album never existed, nobody's life would be much poorer for it-- possibly even Devin's". The A.V. Club head writer Nathan Rabin resumed: "nobody expects maturity from Devin, even though he jarringly mentions that he has a 17-year-old son, but he usually makes eternal adolescence sound a lot more fun than this".

== Track listing ==
No.	Title	Writer(s)	Producer(s)	Length
1.	"Cultural Coughee"	Devin Copeland	Devin the Dude	1:39
2.	"We Get High" (performed by Odd Squad)	Copeland; Dexter Johnson; Robert McQueen; Quincy Whetstone	Q-Stone	3:45
3.	"Still Comin'"	Copeland; Roy Williams; Timothy Hatter	Big Baby; Mirawge	3:20
4.	"Pick My Brain"	Copeland	Devin the Dude	4:37
5.	"That Ain't Cool"	Copeland	Devin the Dude	4:10
6.	"I Gotta Ho" (featuring Jugg Mugg, Smit-D and Tony Mack)	Copeland; Johnson; Roderick Smith; Luster Tone; McQueen	Rob Quest	4:39
7.	"What I Be On"	Copeland; Reggie Coby	Reggie Coby	4:26
8.	"Ultimate High" (featuring Smit-D)	Copeland; Smith; Luster Baker	Luster Baker	4:55
9.	"I Can't Handle It"	Copeland; Michael Dean; Marvin Isley; O'Kelly Isley Jr.; Rudolph Isley; Ronald Isley; Chris Jasper	Mike Dean	4:04
10.	"Where Ya At?"	Copeland; Corey Sullivan	C-Ray Sullivan	3:36
11.	"It's on You" (featuring Ced-B, Korey-B and Tony Mack)	Copeland; Cedrick Bishop III; Korey Burton; Tone; Baker	Luster Baker	4:39
12.	"People Talk" (featuring 14K)	Copeland; Brandon Harris; Kyle White; Michael Morris	Midas	3:53
13.	"All You Need" (featuring Alpha-Bet-D and Scool-Boy)	Copeland; Adrian Sipsey; B. Kilbey; Baker; McQueen	Devin the Dude; Luster Baker; Rob Quest	3:56
14.	"Twitta'"	Copeland	Devin the Dude	0:35
15.	"Funky Lil Freestyle"	Copeland; Williams; Hatter	Big Baby; Mirawge	3:17
Total length:				55:31

== Personnel ==
- Devin "The Dude" Copeland – vocals, producer (tracks: 1, 4, 5, 13, 14)
- Dexter "Jugg Mugg" Johnson – vocals (tracks: 2, 6)
- Robert "Rob Quest" McQueen – vocals (track 2), producer (tracks: 6, 13)
- Roderick "Smit-D" Smith – vocals (tracks: 6, 8)
- Luster "Tony Mack" Tone – vocals (tracks: 6, 11)
- Cedrick "Ced-B" Bishop III – vocals (track 11)
- Korey "Korey-B" Burton – vocals (track 11)
- Brandon Harris – vocals (track 12)
- Kyle "Quad" White – vocals (track 12)
- Adrian "Alpha-Bet-D" Sipsey – vocals (track 13)
- B. "Scool-Boy" Kilbey – vocals (track 13)
- Quincy "Q-Stone" Whetstone – producer (track 2)
- Roy "Big Baby" Williams – producer (tracks: 3, 15)
- Timothy "Mirawge" Hatter – producer (tracks: 3, 15)
- Reggie Coby – producer (track 7)
- Luster "L-Dog" Baker – producer (tracks: 8, 11, 13)
- Mike Dean – producer (track 9)
- Corey "C-Ray" Sullivan – producer (track 10)
- Michael "Midas" Morris – producer (track 12)

== Charts ==
Chart (2010)	Peak position
US Billboard 200	88
US Top R&B/Hip-Hop Albums (Billboard)	19
US Top Rap Albums (Billboard)	9
US Independent Albums (Billboard)	12
