= To tha X-Treme =

Studio album by Devin the Dude
- Released: July 13, 2004
- Recorded: 2003–04
- Studios: Dean's List House of Hits (Houston, TX); Noddfactor Studios (Houston, TX); The Craft (Houston, TX); M.A.D. Studios (Houston, TX)
- Genre: Hip hop
- Length: 1:17:52
- Label: Rap-A-Lot 4 Life
- Producers: J. Prince (exec.); Bigg Tyme; Cory Mo; Davey D; D-Boy; Domo; Luster Baker; Mike B.; Mike Dean; Mr. Mixx; Oonoe Blass; Rob Quest; Tone Capone

Devin the Dude chronology
| Just Tryin' ta Live (2002) | To tha X-Treme (2004) | Waitin' to Inhale (2007) |

Professional ratings
Review scores
| Source | Rating |
|---|---|
| AllMusic | 3.5/5 stars |
| HipHopDX | 7.5/10 |
| RapReviews | 8.5/10 |
| Robert Christgau | (3-star Honorable Mention) |
| Spin | A− |
| Stylus | B+ |
| The Austin Chronicle | 3/4 stars |

To tha X-Treme is the third solo studio album by American rapper Devin the Dude. It was released in 2004 via Rap-A-Lot 4 Life. Recording sessions took place at Dean's List House of Hits, Noddfactor Studios, The Craft, and M.A.D. Studios in Houston. Production was handled by D-Boy, Domo, Cory Mo, Mike Dean, Oonoe Blass, Rob Quest, Bigg Tyme, Davey D, Luster Baker, Mike B., Mr. Mixx, Tone Capone, with J Prince serving as executive producer. It features guest appearances from 8Ball, Erica Marion, KB and Man Child.

The album peaked at number 55 on the Billboard 200 and number 6 on the Top R&B/Hip-Hop Albums in the United States.

== Track listing ==
| No. | Title | Writer(s) | Producer(s) | Length |
|---|---|---|---|---|
| 1. | "Devin's Medley" | | | 0:57 |
| 2. | "To Tha X-Treme" | Devin Copeland; D. Buchanan | Oonoe Blass | 6:17 |
| 3. | "Cooter Brown" | Copeland; Michael Banks | Mike B. | 4:28 |
| 4. | "What?" | Copeland; Davey Cohn | Davey D | 3:24 |
| 5. | "Freak" | Copeland; Anthony Gilmour | Tone Capone | 3:38 |
| 6. | "Right Now" | Copeland | D-Boy | 5:34 |
| 7. | "Too Cute" (featuring Erica Marion) | Copeland; W. Perry; Robert McQueen; Luster Baker; Michael Poye | Rob Quest; Luster Baker; Domo | 5:08 |
| 8. | "Don't Go" | Copeland; Cory Moore; Michael Dean | D-Boy; Cory Mo; Mike Dean | 4:07 |
| 9. | "Come on & Come" | Copeland; David Hobbs | Mr. Mixx | 4:35 |
| 10. | "Go Fight Some Other Crime" | Copeland; Moore; Buchanan | Oonoe Blass | 5:18 |
| 11. | "Briarpatch" | Copeland; McQueen; Poye | Rob Quest; Domo | 5:47 |
| 12. | "She's Gone" | Copeland; Randy Jefferson | Bigg Tyme | 4:50 |
| 13. | "Anythang" | Copeland; Moore | Cory Mo | 5:41 |
| 14. | "Tha Funk" (featuring 8Ball) | Copeland; Premro Smith; Poye | Domo | 5:05 |
| 15. | "Motha" | Copeland; Poye | Domo; D-Boy | 4:55 |
| 16. | "Party" (featuring K.B. and Man Child) | Copeland; Kevin Brown; H. Cross | D-Boy | 3:48 |
| 17. | "Unity" | Copeland; Dean | D-Boy; Mike Dean | 4:20 |
| Total length: | | | | 1:17:52 |

Sample credits

- Track 3 contains a portion of "Now That It's All Over" by Willie Hutch.
- Track 6 contains an interpolation of "Shower the People" by James Taylor.
- Track 13 contains a portion of "Hollywood" by Rick James.

== Personnel ==
- Devin "The Dude" Copeland – vocals (tracks: 2–17), mixing assistant
- Erica Marion – vocals (track 7)
- Assassin – additional vocals (track 10)
- Pee Wee – additional vocals (track 10), engineering
- Perfec' – additional vocals (track 10)
- Dee – additional vocals (track 12)
- Ock – additional vocals (track 12), engineering
- T-Breezy – additional vocals (track 12)
- Premro "8Ball" Smith – vocals (track 14)
- Kevin "KB" Brown – vocals (track 16)
- H. "Man Child" Cross – vocals (track 16)
- Mike Dean – guitar (tracks: 6, 8), bass (track 14), producer (tracks: 8, 17), engineering, mixing, mastering
- Bryan Conner – guitar (track 6)
- Cory "Funkafangaz" Stoops – guitar (tracks: 8, 17)
- Joe "J.B. Money" Bythewood – guitar (track 11)
- Hotan Kheyrandish – keyboards (track 11)
- Greg – drums (track 11)
- Juan Sanchez – guitar (track 13)
- Casey Walden – guitar (track 14)
- Luster Baker – keyboards (track 14), producer (track 7)
- D. Buchanan – producer (tracks: 2, 10)
- Michael "Mike B." Banks – producer (track 3)
- Davey D. Cohn – producer (track 4)
- Anthony "Tone Capone" Gilmour – producer (track 5)
- Luca "D-Boy" Pretolesi – producer (tracks: 6, 8, 15–17)
- Michael "Domo" Poye – producer (tracks: 7, 11, 14, 15)
- Robert "Rob Quest" McQueen – producer (tracks: 7, 11)
- Cory Moore – producer (tracks: 8, 13), engineering
- David "Mr. Mixx" Hobbs – producer (track 9)
- Randy "Bigg Tyme" Jefferson – producer (track 12)
- Goodgrief – DJ mix (track 1)
- Eric – engineering
- James "J Prince" Smith – executive producer
- Mike Frost – artwork, design, photography, layout
- Tony Randle – A&R supervisor
- Anzel Jennings – A&R
- Marico Allen – booking

== Charts ==
| Chart (2004) | Peak position |
|---|---|
| US Billboard 200 | 55 |
| US Top R&B/Hip-Hop Albums (Billboard) | 6 |
