= Gotta Be Me =

Studio album by Devin the Dude
- Released: November 2, 2010
- Recorded: 2009–2010
- Genre: Hip hop
- Length: 50:22
- Label: Real Talk Entertainment
- Producer: Big Hollis; Cozmo; Devin the Dude; Real Talk Ent.

Devin the Dude chronology
Suite 420 (2010)	Gotta Be Me (2010)	One for the Road (2013)

Singles from Gotta Be Me
- 1. "Jus Coolin" Released: September 27, 2010

Professional ratings
Review scores
Source	Rating
HipHopDX	3/5

Gotta Be Me is the eighth solo studio album by American rapper Devin the Dude. It was released on November 2, 2010 via Real Talk Entertainment. Production was handled by Big Hollis, Cozmo, Real Talk Ent. and Devin himself, with Derrick "Sac" Johnson serving as executive producer. The first single "Jus Coolin" had been released on September 27, 2010.

== Track listing ==
No.	Title	Producer(s)	Length
1.	"It's Goin Down!"	Big Hollis	2:57
2.	"Come & Go"	Cozmo	3:30
3.	"I Like What U Do"	Cozmo	4:43
4.	"Shut Up"	Real Talk Ent.	0:55
5.	"Gotta Be Me"	Cozmo	4:12
6.	"No Need to Call"	Cozmo	3:40
7.	"Gimme Some"	Devin the Dude	5:11
8.	"You So Real"	Big Hollis	3:21
9.	"They 10's"	Real Talk Ent.	0:23
10.	"Jus Coolin"	Big Hollis	4:00
11.	"Ain't Goin Nowhere"	Big Hollis	4:30
12.	"When Will I Win?"	Big Hollis	4:56
13.	"Fuckha'"	Cozmo	4:04
14.	"I'm High"	Big Hollis	4:00
Total length:			50:22

Sample credits

- "Come & Go" - Contains a sample of "Let Me Down Easy" by Inez Foxx
- "Gotta Be Me" - Contains a sample of "Free" by Deniece Williams
- "I Like What You Do" - Contains a sample of "Love Me Back" by Willie Hutch
- "No Need to Call" - Contains a sample of "Ring Ring Ring (Ha Ha Hey)" by De La Soul

== Charts ==
Chart (2010)	Peak position
US Top R&B/Hip-Hop Albums (Billboard)	45
US Independent Albums (Billboard)	49
