= Usual Suspects (album) =

Studio album by 5th Ward Boyz
- Released: November 18, 1997
- Recorded: 1996–1997
- Studios: Hippie House Studios (Houston, TX); Digital Services (Houston, TX); The Enterprise (Burbank, CA)
- Genre: Hip-hop
- Length: 1:09:00
- Label: Rap-A-Lot
- Producers: 5th Ward Boyz; Flip; Freddie Young; John Bido; Mike Dean; Mr. Lee; Scarface

5th Ward Boyz chronology
Rated G (1995)	Usual Suspects (1997)	Keep It Poppin' (1999)

Professional ratings
Review scores
Source	Rating
AllMusic	2/5 stars

Usual Suspects is the fourth studio album by American hip-hop group 5th Ward Boyz. It was released on November 18, 1997, through Rap-A-Lot Records. Recording sessions took place at Hippie House Studios and Digital Services in Houston and at the Enterprise in Burbank. Production was handled by Mike Dean, who had produced the majority of the group's previous three albums, Leroy "Mr. Lee" Williams, Freddie Young, Scarface, Flip, John Bido, and the 5th Ward Boyz themselves. It features guest appearances from FWC, Do or Die, Devin the Dude, Johnny P, Red Dog, Scarface, Spice 1, Tasha, Willie D, 8Ball & MJG. The album peaked at number 180 on the Billboard 200 and number 26 on the Top R&B/Hip-Hop Albums charts in the United States.

== Track listing ==
No.	Title	Writer(s)	Producer(s)	Length
1.	"O.G. Intro"			1:08
2.	"Gangsta Shit" (featuring Spice 1 & Mr. Slimm)	Andre Barnes; Richard Nash; Eric Taylor; Leroy Williams	5th Ward Boyz; Mr. Lee	3:58
3.	"Hustlin'" (featuring Red Dog & Mr. Slimm)	Barnes; Nash; Taylor; Freddie Young	Freddy Young	4:52
4.	"Live Your Life" (featuring Tasha)	Barnes; Nash; Taylor; Michael Dean; Norman Washington Giscombe	Mike Dean	4:26
5.	"Big Faces"	Barnes; Nash; Taylor; Dean; Antonio Reid; Daryl Simmons; Kenneth Edmonds	Mike Dean	3:56
6.	"I Know" (featuring Scarface)	Barnes; Nash; Taylor; Brad Jordan; Williams	Scarface; Mr. Lee	5:02
7.	"Heat"	Barnes; Nash; Taylor; Philip Osman	Flip	4:53
8.	"Got II Be Down II Die"	Barnes; Nash; Taylor; John Okuribido	John Bido	4:14
9.	"Live Remote"			1:13
10.	"Fuck Strugglin'" (featuring 8Ball & MJG)	Barnes; Nash; Taylor; Marlon Goodwin; Premro Smith; Dean	Mike Dean	5:36
11.	"Hollyhood"	Barnes; Nash; Taylor; Williams	Mr. Lee; Mike Dean	4:57
12.	"Somethin' to Ride To" (featuring Do Or Die & Johnny P)	Barnes; Nash; Taylor; Dennis Round; Anthony Round; Williams; Joe Bythewood	Mr. Lee; J.B. Money (co.)	4:05
13.	"Don't Nuttin Change" (featuring Gotti)	Barnes; Nash; Taylor; Dean	5th Ward Boyz; Mike Dean	4:52
14.	"Pussy, Weed and Alcohol" (featuring Willie D. & Devin the Dude)	Barnes; Nash; Taylor; William Dennis; Williams	Mr. Lee	5:52
15.	"Til the World Blow Up"	Barnes; Nash; Taylor; Williams	5th Ward Boyz; Mr. Lee	5:35
16.	"Mama's Praying"	Barnes; Nash; Taylor; Dean	Mike Dean	4:11
Total length:				1:09:00

Sample credits

- Track 4 contains a sample of "Mama Used to Say" written by Junior Giscombe.
- Track 5 contains portions of "Don't Be Cruel" written by L.A. Reid, Daryl Simmons and Babyface.

== Personnel ==
- Andre "007" Barnes – vocals, producer (tracks: 2, 13, 15), engineering, mixing
- Richard "Lo Life" Nash – vocals, producer (tracks: 2, 13, 15), engineering, mixing
- Eric "E-Rock" Taylor – vocals, producer (tracks: 2, 13, 15), engineering, mixing
- Frank "Mr. Slimm" Robinson – vocals (tracks: 2, 3)
- Robert Lee "Spice 1" Green Jr. – vocals (track 2)
- Red Dog – vocals (track 3)
- Tasha a.k.a. Tah-Tah – vocals (track 4)
- Brad "Scarface" Jordan – vocals & producer (track 6)
- Premro "8Ball" Smith – vocals (track 10)
- Marlon "MJG" Goodwin – vocals (track 10)
- Dennis "A.K. 47" Round – vocals (track 12)
- Anthony "N.A.R.D." Round – vocals (track 12)
- Johnny P. – vocals (track 12)
- J. "Gotti" Baker – vocals (track 13)
- William "Willie D" Dennis – vocals (track 14)
- Devin "The Dude" Copeland – vocals (track 14)
- Mike Dean – bass & drums (track 11), producer (tracks: 4, 5, 10, 11, 13, 16), engineering, mixing, mastering
- Leroy "Mr. Lee" Williams – producer (tracks: 2, 6, 11, 12, 14, 15), mixing
- Freddie Young – producer (track 3)
- Philip "Flip" Osman – producer (track 7), engineering
- John Okuribido – producer (track 8)
- Joe "J.B. Money" Bythewood – co-producer (track 12)
- James Hoover – engineering, mixing
- James "J. Prince" Smith – executive producer
- "O.G. Dewey" Forker – executive producer
- Jason Clark – art direction, design

== Charts ==
Chart (1997)	Peak position
US Billboard 200	180
US Top R&B/Hip-Hop Albums (Billboard)	26
