= Keep It Poppin' =

P.W.A.: The Album... Keep It Poppin'

Studio album by 5th Ward Boyz
- Released: August 31, 1999
- Recorded: 1998–99
- Genre: Hip-hop
- Length: 1:10:03
- Label: Rap-A-Lot Records
- Producer: J Prince (exec.); O.G. Dewey (exec.); Derek "Grizz" Edwards; Mr. Lee; E-Rock

5th Ward Boyz chronology
Usual Suspects (1997)	P.W.A.: The Album... Keep It Poppin' (1999)	Recognize the Mob (2000)

Professional ratings
Review scores
Source	Rating
AllMusic	3/5 stars

P.W.A.: The Album... Keep It Poppin' is the fifth studio album by American hip-hop group the 5th Ward Boyz. It was released on August 31, 1999, through Rap-A-Lot Records, making it their final record for the label. Production was handled by Derek "Grizz" Edwards, Mr. Lee and 5th Ward Boyz member E-Rock, with executive producers J Prince and OG Dewey. It features guest appearances from Devin the Dude, Ghetto Twiinz, Kuirshan, Outlawz, Rapsta, Willie D and Yukmouth. The album peaked at number 125 on the Billboard 200 and at number 26 on the Top R&B/Hip-Hop Albums in the United States.

== Track listing ==
No.	Title	Producer(s)	Length
1.	"PWA Intro"		0:53
2.	"Pussy Poppin'"	Derek "Grizz" Edwards	3:48
3.	"Jealous"	Derek "Grizz" Edwards	4:21
4.	"Get Wit U" (featuring Kuirshan)	Derek "Grizz" Edwards	3:56
5.	"Act a Donkey" (featuring Ghetto Twiinz)	Mr. Lee	4:11
6.	"Til' They Kill Me"	Derek "Grizz" Edwards	3:57
7.	"Buckin'"	Derek "Grizz" Edwards	5:04
8.	"Hedpusefingtip'nlips" (featuring Rapsta)	E-Rock	4:25
9.	"See Us Ball"	Derek "Grizz" Edwards	3:37
10.	"That's My CD"		0:28
11.	"Rhyme or Crime"	Derek "Grizz" Edwards	3:39
12.	"Fear No Man"	Mr. Lee	4:20
13.	"Thug & Dangerous" (featuring Yukmouth)	Derek "Grizz" Edwards	4:20
14.	"P.W.A." (featuring Willie D and Devin the Dude)	Mr. Lee	5:48
15.	"Anotha Ho"	Derek "Grizz" Edwards	5:07
16.	"Immortal 2k"	Derek "Grizz" Edwards	3:25
17.	"All the Same" (featuring Big Syke and Kuirshan)	Derek "Grizz" Edwards	4:02
18.	"S. A. Partner" (featuring 13 Strong)	Derek "Grizz" Edwards	4:42
Total length:			1:10:03

== Charts ==
Chart (1999)	Peak position
US Billboard 200	125
US Top R&B/Hip-Hop Albums (Billboard)	26
