= 5th Ward Boyz =

American hip-hop trio

- Origin: Houston, Texas, United States
- Genre: Hip-hop
- Years active: 1993—2003
- Labels: Rap-A-Lot; Underground Records
- Members: Andre "007" Barnes; Eric "E-Rock" Taylor; Richard "Lo Life" Nash

5th Ward Boyz is an American southern hip-hop trio, based out of Houston, Texas. Their name is derived from Houston's Fifth Ward. The group signed to Rap-A-Lot Records following the Geto Boys' popularity on the label.

The group originally consisted of Andre "007" Barnes and Eric "E-Rock" Taylor, with Richard "Lo Life" Nash joining the group following his release from prison for their second album, Gangsta Funk. They have been influenced by Dr. Dre, Funkadelic, N.W.A, Ice Cube, Eazy-E, Compton's Most Wanted.

The group was signed to Rap-A-Lot Records in 1993, 7 years after the label started.

== Discography ==
=== Studio albums ===
Year	Title	Chart positions	
Year	Title	U.S.	U.S. R&B
1993	Ghetto Dope: Released: May 18, 1993; Label: Rap-A-Lot/Priority	176	19
1994	Gangsta Funk: Released: February 22, 1994; Label: Rap-A-Lot/Virgin	105	13
1995	Rated G: Released: November 28, 1995; Label: Rap-A-Lot/Virgin	189	35
1997	Usual Suspects: Released: November 18, 1997; Label: Rap-A-Lot/Virgin	180	26
1999	Keep It Poppin': Released: August 31, 1999; Label: Rap-A-Lot	125	26
2001	Recognize the Mob: Released: October 31, 2001; Label: Underground Records		
2003	Word Is Bond: Released: 2003; Label: Underground Records		

=== Compilation albums ===
- Greatest Hits (2004)

=== Singles ===
- "Thanks for Blessing" (1991)
- "Ghetto Curse Words" (1992)
- "Same Ol'" (1994)
- "Gangsta Funk" (1994)
- "Situations" (1995)
- "One Night Stand" (1995)
- "P.W.A" (1999)

=== As featured artist ===
- "U-Neek's Points" (1995)
