= Menace Clan =

American hip-hop group

- Origin: Los Angeles, California, U.S.
- Genres: Hip-hop
- Years active: 1993–2000
- Label: Rap-a-Lot / Noo Trybe
- Members: Dee; Assassin

Menace Clan was an American hip-hop duo composed of Dante "Dee" Miller and Walter "Assassin" Adams formerly signed to Rap-a-Lot Records.

== History ==
After signing with Rap-a-Lot, the duo appeared on Poppa LQ's Your Entertainment, My Reality and Bushwick Bill's Phantom of the Rapra, and contributed a verse to the All-Star track, "The Points".

The duo's debut album Da Hood was released on October 10, 1995, but it failed to sell a significant number of copies and only reached number 44 on the Billboard Top R&B/Hip-Hop Albums.

After the release of Da Hood, Menace Clan remained with Rap-a-Lot, appearing on the Geto Boys' The Resurrection and Scarface's My Homies, before leaving the label in 1998.

The duo's last appearance was in 2000 on D-Red's Smokin' & Lean'n 2000. Dante also appeared on the track, "My Block", featured on Houston rapper Lil Flip's 2000 underground debut album The Leprechaun.

== Discography ==
Year	Album	Peak chart positions	
Year	Album	U.S. R&B	U.S. Heat
1995	Da Hood: Released: October 10, 1995; Label: Rap-a-Lot / Noo Trybe	44	33
