= Fadanuf Fa Erybody!! =

Studio album by Odd Squad
- Released: February 1, 1994
- Recorded: 1993
- Genres: Southern hip hop; jazz rap; alternative hip hop
- Length: 51:02
- Labels: Rap-A-Lot; Priority
- Producers: J. Prince (exec.); DJ Styles; Rob Quest; N.O. Joe; Mike Dean

Odd Squad chronology
Fadanuf Fa Erybody!! (1994)	Waitin Our Turn (2007)

Professional ratings
Review scores
Source	Rating
AllMusic	3/5 stars
RapReviews	8.5/10

Fadanuf Fa Erybody!! is the debut studio album by American hip hop trio Odd Squad (now known as the Coughee Brothaz), consists of Devin the Dude, Jugg Mugg and Rob Quest. It was released on February 1, 1994 through Rap-A-Lot Records with distribution via Priority Records. Production was handled by Carlos "DJ Styles" Garza and Rob Quest with N.O. Joe and Mike Dean.

The project's loose party atmosphere is further represented on the cover artwork, which is a light parody of Ernie Barnes’ famous painting The Sugar Shack; the latter is best known for its inclusion on the cover of late, great soul legend Marvin Gaye's 1976 album I Want You, and was additionally parodied by retro-blaxploitation hip hop innovators Camp Lo on their classic 1997 debut album Uptown Saturday Night.

It was on the Top R&B/Hip-Hop Albums chart for 3 weeks, peaking at #66. Rap-A-Lot called it Scarface's best release. Despite high praise from the label, the album would receive little promotion besides three dates opening for Scarface.

Rob Quest is blind. Fadanuf Fa Erybody!! features a song called "I Can't See It" where he pokes lighthearted fun at his blindness.

== Track listing ==
No.	Title	Producer(s)	Length
1.	"Intro ta Oddness"	DJ Styles; Rob Quest	1:09
2.	"Da Squad"	DJ Styles; Rob Quest; N.O. Joe; Mike Dean	3:58
3.	"Hoes Wit Babies"	DJ Styles; Rob Quest; N.O. Joe	2:53
4.	"Trip Hip" (Interlude)	DJ Styles; Rob Quest	0:40
5.	"Here to Say a Lil' Somethin'"	DJ Styles; Rob Quest	2:48
6.	"Rev. Puff"	DJ Styles; Rob Quest; Mike Dean	2:09
7.	"Smokin' Dat Weed"	DJ Styles; Rob Quest; N.O. Joe	2:48
8.	"Putcha Lips"	DJ Styles; Rob Quest	4:36
9.	"Jazz Rendition"	DJ Styles; Rob Quest	2:58
10.	"Swisseredot" (Interlude)	DJ Styles; Rob Quest	0:39
11.	"Coughee"	DJ Styles; Rob Quest; N.O. Joe	3:33
12.	"Fa Sho"	DJ Styles; Rob Quest; N.O. Joe; Mike Dean	4:15
13.	"I Can't See It"	DJ Styles; Rob Quest; N.O. Joe	3:09
14.	"Shit Pit"	DJ Styles; Rob Quest	0:59
15.	"Your Pussy's Like Dope"	DJ Styles; Rob Quest; N.O. Joe	3:32
16.	"Came Na Gedown" (featuring 2 Low, Mr. 3-2, 6-4, Cozy-K, Ed Jack, Kilo, Lez Moné, No-DoZ, Ricardo Royal, Scarface, Smit-D and The Unrappable)	DJ Styles; Rob Quest	7:29
17.	"Long Time Comin'"	DJ Styles; Rob Quest; Mike Dean	3:36
Total length:			51:02
