= Bushwick Bill =

Jamaican-American rapper (1966–2019)

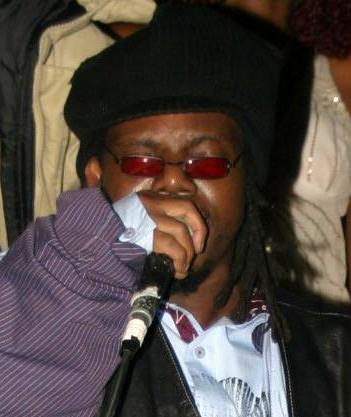
- Bushwick Bill performing on January 1, 2005

Background information
- Also known as: Little Billy; Dr. Wolfgang Von Bushwickin The Barbarian Mother-Funky Stay High Dollar Billster
- Born: Richard William Stephen Shaw; December 8, 1966; Kingston, Jamaica
- Origin: Houston, Texas
- Died: June 9, 2019 (aged 52) Denver, Colorado, U.S.
- Genre: Southern hip hop
- Occupation: Rapper
- Years active: 1986–2019
- Label: Rap-a-Lot
- Formerly of: Geto Boys
- Height: 3 ft 8 in (1.12 m)
- Children: 4

Richard William Stephen Shaw (December 8, 1966 – June 9, 2019), better known by his stage name Bushwick Bill, was a Jamaican rapper. He was a member of the Texas hip hop group Geto Boys, a group he originally joined as a breakdancer in 1986 as Little Billy. He went on to become one third of the most popular incarnation of the group, alongside Willie D and Scarface.

== Early life ==
Bushwick Bill was born Richard William Stephen Shaw on December 8, 1966, in Kingston, Jamaica and was raised in Bushwick, Brooklyn. His father was a merchant mariner and his mother was a maid. He was born with dwarfism and as an adult was listed as 3 feet 8 inches (112 cm) tall.

== Career ==
Shaw got his start in the music industry in 1986 as a member of the Geto Boys, where he performed as a dancer known as Little Billy. He later transitioned to rapping and was featured on the Geto Boys' debut album, Making Trouble in 1988. The album received little attention and negative reviews, which led to Rap-A-Lot dropping all members from the group except for Bill and DJ Ready Red. Soon afterwards, Rap-A-Lot CEO J. Prince recruited Scarface and Willie Dee, two local aspiring artists from Houston to be in the second incarnation of the group. The new lineup began recording together in 1988 and their debut project as a group and second overall for the Geto Boys, Grip It! On That Other Level was released in 1989 to a much better reception, being considered a classic album and one of the earliest entries into the horrorcore genre. Around that time the group's lyrical content began to generate controversy, which multiplied in 1991 when the cover of the group's third album We Can't Be Stopped depicted a graphic image of Bill moments after he was shot during an argument with his girlfriend. Nevertheless, the album went on to be their most successful to that point, being certified platinum in 1992.

Bushwick Bill can be heard on the album The Chronic by Dr. Dre. He speaks in the intro of "Stranded on Death Row." In addition, he appears in the video of "Dre Day" as one of Eazy-E's fellow rappers. His 1998 album No Surrender...No Retreat was dedicated to his friend Gil Epstein, a Fort Bend County prosecutor who was shot dead in Houston in 1996.

== Personal life ==
On June 19, 1991, during an argument with his girlfriend (who was also the mother of his child), Bill was shot in the face. He lost his right eye as a result. Reports vary as to who actually fired the gun, as both participants' hands were on the weapon during the altercation. Bill has clarified that he was suicidal and attempting to force her into killing him, even going as far as to threaten their sons' life. It has been suggested that part of the motivation was an attempt to score life insurance money for his mother. He had been under the influence of Everclear grain alcohol and PCP. The aftermath of the incident was documented on the album cover for Geto Boys' 1991 album We Can't Be Stopped, which shows Shaw being pushed through the hospital on a gurney by bandmates Willie D and Scarface. Shaw claims that he "died and came back to life" during the incident, and he made reference to it in his music. In 2006, he became a born-again Christian. In May 2010, Shaw was arrested in Atlanta for possession of marijuana and cocaine. Based on his prior arrest record and not being an American citizen, he faced deportation.

== Illness and death ==
On May 1, 2019, Shaw revealed that he had been diagnosed with stage 4 pancreatic cancer. Barely a month later, on June 9, reports emerged that he had died, but news of his death was later refuted by his son. However, it was reported and confirmed that Shaw died later that day at a hospital in Denver.

== Discography ==
Album information
Little Big Man
- Released: September 8, 1992
- Billboard 200 chart position: No. 32
- R&B/Hip-Hop chart position: No. 15
- Singles: "Ever So Clear"/"Call Me Crazy" (No. 49 R&B)
Phantom of the Rapra
- Released: July 11, 1995
- Billboard 200 chart position: No. 43
- R&B/Hip-Hop chart position: No. 3
- Singles: "Who's the Biggest"/"Only God Knows" (No. 113 Pop, No. 88 R&B)
No Surrender...No Retreat
- Released: October 27, 1998
- Billboard 200 chart position: -
- R&B/Hip-Hop chart position: No. 84
- Singles:
Universal Small Souljah
- Released: March 13, 2001
- Billboard 200 chart position: -
- R&B/Hip-Hop chart position: -
- Singles: "Unforgiven"
Gutta Mixx
- Released: March 29, 2005
- Billboard 200 chart position: -
- R&B/Hip-Hop chart position: -
- Singles: "20Minutesormore"
My Testimony of Redemption
- Released: November 17, 2009
- Billboard 200 chart position: -
- R&B/Hip-Hop chart position: No. 66

== Guest appearances ==
- Dr. Dre – The Chronic: "Stranded on Death Row"
- Seagram – The Dark Roads: "Wages of Sin"
- Mad Cobra – Hard to Wet, Easy to Dry: "Dead End Street"
- Kool G Rap & DJ Polo – Live and Let Die: "Two to the Head"
- DFC – Thangs in the Hood: "A Piece of My Mind Intro"
- Menace Clan – Da Hood: "Da Hood"; "Have You Ever Heard"
- Do or Die – Headz or Tailz: "Tailz"
- Scarface – My Homies: "Do What You Do"
