= Paul Wall discography =

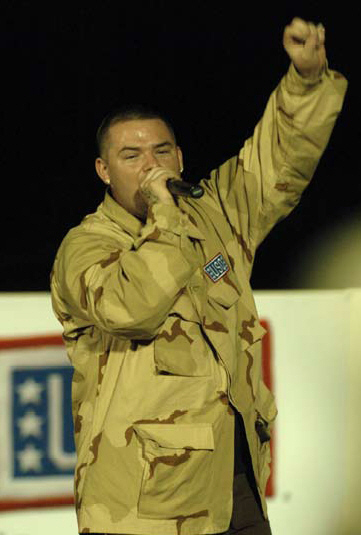
- Studio albums: 13
- Extended plays: 1
- Singles: 23
- Mixtapes: 6
- Collaborative albums: 6
- Promotional singles: 1
- Guest appearances: 93

The discography of American rapper Paul Wall consists of thirteen studio albums, six collaborative albums, one remix album, six mixtapes, one EPs, twenty-three singles (including sixteen as a featured artist), and one promotional single.

== Albums ==
=== Studio albums ===
List of studio albums, with selected chart positions and certifications
Title	Album details	Peak chart positions			Certifications
Title	Album details	US	US R&B	US Rap	Certifications
Chick Magnet	Released: February 24, 2004 (US); Label: Paid in Full; Formats: CD, digital download	—	54	—	
The Peoples Champ	Released: September 13, 2005 (US); Label: Swishahouse, Asylum, Atlantic; Format: CD, LP, digital download	1	1	1	RIAA: Platinum
Get Money, Stay True	Released: April 3, 2007 (US); Label: Swishahouse, Asylum, Atlantic; Format: CD, digital download	8	2	1	
Fast Life	Released: May 12, 2009 (US); Label: Swishahouse, Asylum; Formats: CD, digital download	15	6	4	
Heart of a Champion	Released: July 13, 2010 (US); Label: Swishahouse, Asylum, Warner Bros.; Formats: CD, digital download	58	11	7	
#Checkseason	Released: December 10, 2013 (US); Label: Paul Wall Music, Empire; Formats: CD, digital download	—	—	—	
The Po-Up Poet	Released: December 2, 2014 (US); Label: Oiler Mobb, Empire; Formats: CD, digital download	—	—	—	
Slab God	Released: September 25, 2015 (US); Label: Oiler Mobb, Empire; Formats: CD, digital download	—	37	—	
Houston Oiler	Released: October 21, 2016 (US); Label: Olier Mobb, Empire; Formats: CD, digital download	—	47	—	
Bounce Backs Over Setbacks	Released: January 19, 2018 (US); Label: Oiler Mobb; Formats: CD, digital download	—	—	—	
Mind Over Matter	Released: March 20, 2020 (US); Label: Oiler Mobb; Formats: CD, digital download	—	—	—	
Subculture	Released: October 2, 2020 (US); Label: Paul Wall Music; Formats: CD, digital download	—	—	—	
Hall of Fame Hustler	Released: September 10, 2021 (US); Label: Oiler Mobb; Formats: CD, digital download	—	—	—	
The Great Wall	Released: December 15, 2023 (US); Label: Paul Wall Music; Formats: CD, digital download	—	—	—	
Once Upon a Grind	Released: December 13, 2024 (US); Label: Paul Wall Music; Formats: CD, digital download	—	—	—	
Fortune & Glory	Released: June 5, 2026 (US); Label: Paul Wall Music; Formats: CD, digital download	—	—	—	

=== Collaborative albums ===
List of collaborative albums, with selected chart positions and sales figures
Title	Album details	Peak chart positions		Sales
Title	Album details	US Ind.	US R&B	Sales
Get Ya Mind Correct (with Chamillionaire)	Released: June 25, 2002 (US); Label: Paid in Full; Formats: CD, LP, digital download	43	67	US: 150,000
Controversy Sells (with Chamillionaire)	Released: January 25, 2005 (US); Label: Paid in Full; Formats: CD, LP, digital download	30	50	
The Legalizers: Legalize or Die, Vol. 1 (with Baby Bash)	Released: April 15, 2016 (US); Label: Paul Wall Music / Bashtown Music Group; Formats: CD, LP, digital download	—	—	
Diamond Boyz (with C Stone)	Released: February 3, 2017 (US); Label: Paul Wall Music; Formats: CD, LP, digital download	—	—	
The Legalizers, Vol. 2: Indoor Grow (with Baby Bash)	Released: April 20, 2018 (US); Label: Paul Wall Music / Bashtown Music Group; Formats: CD, LP, digital download	—	—	
Slab Talk (with Lil' Keke)	Released: June 5, 2020 (US); Label: 7 Thirteen Music / Oiler Mobb Ent / SoSouth; Formats: CD, LP, digital download	—	—	
Start 2 Finish (with Termanology)	Released: April 8, 2022 (US); Label: Perfect Time Music Group; Formats: CD, LP, digital download	—	—	
The Legalizers 3: Plant Based (with Baby Bash)	Released: July 10, 2022 (US); Label: Paul Wall Music, Bashtown Music Group; Formats: CD, LP, digital download	—	—	
Start Finish Repeat (with Termanology)	Released: October 13, 2023 (US); Label: Perfect Time Music Group; Formats: CD, LP, digital download	—	—	
The Tonite Show (with DJ.Fresh)	Released: July 25, 2025 (US); Label: Perfect Time Music Group; Formats: CD, LP, digital download	—	—	
Repeat Repeat Repeat (with Termanology)	Released: August 14, 2026 (US); Label: Perfect Time Music Group; Formats: CD, LP, digital download	—	—	

=== Remix albums ===
List of remix albums, with selected chart positions
Title	Album details	Peak chart positions
Title	Album details	US R&B
Get Money, Stay True (Chopped and Screwed) (with Michael "5000" Watts")	Released: April 3, 2007 (US); Label: Swishahouse, Asylum, Atlantic; Formats: CD, digital download	61

== Extended plays ==
List of extended plays, with selected chart positions
Title	Extended play details	Peak chart positions	
Title	Extended play details	US Ind.	US R&B
Give Thanks (with Statik Selektah)	Released: November 28, 2019 (US); Label: Showoff; Formats: CD, digital download	—	—

== Mixtapes ==
List of mixtapes, with selected information
Title	Mixtape details
Sole Music	Released: June 11, 2010 (US); Label: Swishahouse; Formats: Digital download
No Sleep Til Houston	Released: March 7, 2012 (US); Label: SMC Recordings; Formats: Digital download
Welcome 2 Texas Vol. 3 (with Slim Thug)	Released: February 16, 2013 (US); Label: Boss Hogg Outlaw/SoSouth; Formats: Digital download
M.I.B. (Making Independent Bread) (with D-Boss)	Released: March 27, 2014 (US); Label: GT Digital; Formats: Digital download
Frozen Face Vol. 1	Released: November 22, 2018 (US); Label: Oiler Mobb Ent.; Format: Digital download
Frozen Face Vol. 2	Released: July 31, 2019 (US); Label: Oiler Mobb Ent.; Format: Digital download

== Singles ==
=== As lead artist ===
List of singles, with selected chart positions and certifications, showing year released and album name
Title	Year	Peak chart positions				Certifications	Album
Title	Year	US	US R&B /HH	US Rap	NZ Hot	Certifications	Album
"Sittin' Sidewayz" (featuring Big Pokey)	2005	93	34	24	—	RIAA: Gold (mastertone)	The Peoples Champ
"They Don't Know" (featuring Mike Jones and Bun B)	2006	—	71	—	—		The Peoples Champ
"Girl"	2006	35	42	7	—	RIAA: Gold	The Peoples Champ
"Break 'Em Off" (featuring Lil' Keke)	2007	72	58	24	—		Get Money, Stay True
"I'm Throwed" (featuring Jermaine Dupri)	2007	87	47	21	—		Get Money, Stay True
"Bizzy Body" (featuring Webbie and Mouse)	2008	—	49	—	—		Fast Life
"I'm on Patron"	2010	—	—	—	—		Heart of a Champion
"Swangin in the Rain"	2015	—	—	—	—		Slab God
"Thangz Are Crazy" (featuring Z-Ro)	2016	—	—	—	—		Houston Oiler
"World Series Grillz" (with Lil' Keke and Z-Ro)	2017	—	—	—	—		Bounce Backs Over Setbacks
"Johnny Dang" (with That Mexican OT and Drodi)	2023	65	19	14	18	RIAA: Platinum; RMNZ: Gold	Lonestar Luchador
"—" denotes a title that did not chart, or was not released in that territory.

=== As featured artist ===
List of singles, with selected chart positions, showing year released and album name
Title	Year	Peak chart positions			Certification	Album
Title	Year	US	US R&B /HH	US Rap	Certification	Album
"Still Tippin'" (Mike Jones featuring Slim Thug and Paul Wall)	2004	60	25	14	—	Who Is Mike Jones?
"What You Been Drankin On?" (Jim Jones featuring P. Diddy, Paul Wall and Jha Jha)	2005	—	—	—	—	Harlem: Diary of a Summer
"I Got Dat Drank" (Frayser Boy featuring Mike Jones and Paul Wall)	2005	—	—	—	—	Me Being Me
"Just a Touch" (Funkmaster Flex featuring Paul Wall and 50 Cent )	2005	—	72	—	—	Funkmaster Flex Car Show Tour
"Grillz" (Nelly featuring Paul Wall and Ali & Gipp)	2005	1	2	1	RIAA: Platinum; RMNZ: Gold	Sweatsuit
"Still on It" (Ashanti featuring Paul Wall and Method Man)	2005	—	55	—	—	Collectables by Ashanti
"Drive Slow" (Kanye West featuring Paul Wall, GLC and T.I.)	2006	—	—	—	RIAA: Gold	Late Registration & The Peoples Champ
"It's You" (Urban Mystic featuring Paul Wall)	2006	—	61	—	—	Ghetto Revelations 2
"Holla at Me" (DJ Khaled featuring Lil Wayne, Paul Wall, Fat Joe, Rick Ross and Pitbull)	2006	59	24	15	—	Listennn... the Album
"Way I Be Leanin'" (Juvenile featuring Mike Jones, Paul Wall, Skip and Wacko)	2006	—	—	—	—	Reality Check
"About Us" (Brooke Hogan featuring Paul Wall)	2006	33	—	—	—	Undiscovered
"Diamonds & Patron" (Tino Cochino featuring Paul Wall, DJ Felli Fel and DJ Class)	2009	—	—	—	—	Non-album single
"The Main Event" (Chamillionaire featuring Dorrough, Paul Wall and Slim Thug)	2010	—	—	—	—	Venom (Unreleased)
"So Gone (What My Mind Says)" (Jill Scott featuring Paul Wall)	2011	—	28	—	—	The Light of the Sun
"I'm from Texas" (Trae Tha Truth featuring Paul Wall, Z-Ro, Slim Thug, Bun B and Kirko Bangz)	2012	—	—	—	—	The Blackprint & Banned
"Cuz I'm Famous" (Travis Barker featuring Paul Wall, Hopsin and Yelawolf)	2013	—	—	—	—	Non-album single
"—" denotes a title that did not chart, or was not released in that territory.

=== Promotional singles ===
List of singles, with selected chart positions, showing year released and album name
Title	Year	Album
"Draped Up" (Remix) (Bun B featuring Lil' Keke, Slim Thug, Chamillionaire, Paul Wall, Mike Jones, Aztek, Lil' Flip and Z-Ro)	2007	Trill

== Guest appearances ==
List of non-single guest appearances, with other performing artists, showing year released and album name
Title	Year	Other artist(s)	Album
"One Time"	2001	Lucky Luciano	Lucky Me
"Don't Stare At Us"	2003	OG Ron C, Chamillionaire	Southern's Finest
"Just Like You"	2003	The Last Mr. Bigg, Chamillionaire	The Mask Is Off
"Oh No"	2003	Trae, Chamillionaire	Losing Composure
"After Party"	2004	Bigg Tyme, Dolla Da'Costa, Magno	The Day After Hell Broke Loose
"Oh No Reloaded"	2004	Trae	Same Thing Different Day
"It's Too Late"	2004	Lil' Head	Tha 4'3 Giant
"What Y'all Gone Do?"	2005	Blackmail, Chamillionaire	Risk vs. Reward Vol. 2
"Throwed Off"	2005	Baby Bash, Natalie	Super Saucy
"From the South"	2005	Z-Ro, Lil' Flip	Let the Truth Be Told
"What Ya Know About..."	2005	Mike Jones, Killa Kyleon	Who Is Mike Jones?
"Fuck the Bouncerz Up"	2005	Play-N-Skillz, Lil Jon & the East Side Boyz	The Album Before the Album
"Find Me a Freak"	2005	Max Minelli	Get Served
"I Got Dat Drank"	2005	Frayser Boy, Mike Jones	Me Being Me
"What You Been Drankin On?"	2005	Jim Jones, Diddy, Jha Jha	Harlem: Diary of a Summer
"Swervin'"	2005	Three 6 Mafia, Mike Jones	Most Known Unknown
"When I Pull Up at the Club"	2005	Three 6 Mafia	Most Known Unknown
"Machete Reloaded"	2005	Daddy Yankee	Barrio Fino en Directo
"Where Dem Hoes At"	2005	B-Legit	Block Movement
"What It Do"	2006	50/50 Twin, Chamillionaire	Representin Money
"Cadillac"	2006	Trae, Three 6 Mafia, Jay'Ton, Lil Boss	Restless
"Make Dat Pussy Pop"	2006	Tha Dogg Pound	Cali Iz Active
"All Eyes on Me"	2006	LeToya Luckett	Letoya
"That's a Bet"	2006	J.R. Writer	History in the Making
"Mattress Mack"	2006	Jamie Kennedy	Blowin' Up
"Dippin In Da Lac"	2006	Big Tuck	Tha Absolute Truth
"Grill & Woman"	2006	DJ Clue?, Mike Jones, Bun B	The Professional 3
"Let's Get It On"	2007	H.A.W.K., Scooby, Slim Thug	Endangered Species
"Down to the Floor"	2007	Cozmo, Alfamega, P$C	Against All Odds
"Hit 'Em Up"	2007	DJ Khaled, Bun B	We the Best
"What a Feeling"	2007	Collie Buddz	Collie Buddz
"I Got Dat Candy	2007	Lil Wyte	The One and Only
"Southside Thang"	2007	Chingo Bling, Fat Pat	They Can't Deport Us All
"Gettin' Money"	2007	DJ Drama, Killa Kyleon, Lil' Keke, Slim Thug	Gangsta Grillz: The Album
"Hard Tops & Drops"	2008	Keak da Sneak, Scoot	Deified
"On Citas"	2008	Keak da Sneak, Chingo Bling	Deified
"Popped Up"	2008	Lucky Luciano	Ahead of My Time
"Get the Fuck Outta Here"	2008	Tech N9ne, The Popper	Killer
"On My Feet"	2008	Skatterman & Snug Brim	Word on tha Streets
"She Wanna Go"	2008	Colby O'Donis	Colby O
"Eyes On Paper"	2008	Z-Ro	Crack
"G Shit"	2008	Trae, Jay'Ton	The Beginning
"I'm in Luv (wit a Stripper) Remix"	2008	T-Pain, Pimp C, Twista, R. Kelly	—N/a
"Ooh So Sexy"	2008	Jon B.	Helpless Romantic
"Money In the City"	2008	Lil' Keke, Slim Thug, Trey Virdure	Loved by Few, Hated by Many
"Top Drop"	2009	Slim Thug	Boss of All Bosses
"Welcome to Houston"	2009	Slim Thug, Chamillionaire, Mike Jones, Bun B, Yung Redd, Lil' Keke, Z-Ro, Mike D, Big Pokey, Rob G, Trae, Lil' O, Pimp C	Boss of All Bosses
"Leave Another Behind"	2009	Mddl Fngz, Chamillionaire, Bun B	Smoking With the Enemy
"Get It In"	2009	The Jacka, Masspike Miles	Tear Gas
"Cadillac"	2010	Jay'Ton, Trae, Three 6 Mafia, Lil Boss	Got It By Tha Ton
"Pimp Hop"	2010	Andre Nickatina	Khan! The Me Generation
"Denzel Washington"	2010	Z-Ro, Chamillionaire	Heroin
"Paul and Paz"	2010	Vinnie Paz, Block McCloud	Season of the Assassin
"From H-Town to Poznań"	2010	Kaczor, Shellerini	Przyjaźń, Duma, Godność
"Don't Fuck With Me"	2011	Travis Barker, Jay Rock, Kurupt	Give the Drummer Some
"Body Moves Slow"	2011	Baby Bash, Krizz Kaliko	Bashtown
"Follow Me"	2011	Iron Solomon, Isaiah	Monster
"Too Throwed"	2011	Lucky Luciano, Lil' Keke	Money Bags
"Middle Finger"	2011	Limp Bizkit	Gold Cobra
"Bread Up"	2011	Pimp C, DJ B-Do	Still Pimping
"Hold Up"	2011	Pimp C, Bun B	Still Pimping
"Phenomenon"	2011	Brokencyde	Guilty Pleasure
"Houston / Creepin"	2011	Slim Thug, Chamillionaire	Houston
"Knowmtalmbout"	2012	Kirko Bangz	Progression 2: A Young Texas Playa
"Money"	2012	Big Bad 4-0, Chamillionaire, OJ da Juiceman	New World Agenda
"All Mine"	2012	Planet Asia	Black Belt Theatre
"You"	2012	Fly Society	International Passport
"Come With Me"	2012	2win, Lil' Keke	Imagine
"Im A Ridah"	2012	Juice McCain, A.C.E., Zone, Gauge, LZ, Gwap Onehunnid & Born	American Me III:The Foundation
"Bitch I'm Ballin"	2012	C-Bo	Orca
"Swimming PooL Flow"	2012	Slim Thug, Delo	Thug Thursday
"Purple Swag Remix"	2012	ASAP Rocky, Bun B	Long. Live. ASAP [Deluxe]
"Lettin' Them Know"	2012	Kirko Bangz	Procrastination Kills 4
"5 Dimension"	2012	J.R. Writer	ET:Extra-Terrestrial Musik
"You Rockin"	2012	Young Dolph	Blue Magic
"Rollin'"	2012	Game, Kanye West, Trae tha Truth, Z-Ro, Slim Thug	Sunday Service
"Steak & Shrimp"	2013	Le$, Slim Thug	—N/a
"Hustle"	2013	Yelawolf	Trunk Muzik Returns
"Ol’ Skool Pontiac"	2013	Jeremih, Big Sean	—N/a
"Dance On The Moon"	2013	Travis Scott, Theophilus London	Owl Pharaoh
"Cup Up Top Down"	2013	Kirko Bangz, Z-Ro, Slim Thug	Progression III
"Let It Whip"	2013	Lecrae	Church Clothes 2
"Picture Me Swangin (Remix)"	2015	Delorean, Slim Thug, Lil' Keke, Mitchelle'l	Look Alive
"Freeway"	2016	B-Real, Berner	Prohibition, Pt. 3
"Niice"	2016	Berner, Quavo	Packs
"Do Better"	2016	Big Scoob, Boogie Man	H.O.G.
"Swing Down"	2017	Slim Thug	Welcome 2 Houston
"RIP Parking Lot"	2017	Slim Thug	The World Is Yours
"Slidin On Candy"	2018	GT Garza	Brown By Honor 2
"Cake Boss"	2019	Zaytoven	Make America Trap Again
"Jon Snow"	2019	Bun B, Statik Selektah, Le$	TrillStatik
"Foot Locker"	2019	Kool Keith	KEITH
"Feet Up"	2019	Rittz	Put a Crown on It
"Juice"	2019	Tobe Nwigwe	Fouriginals
"No Substitute"	2020	Statik Selektah, Benny The Butcher, Brady Watt	The Balancing Act
"Prevail"	2020	Berner, B-Real	Los Meros
"Turquoise Tornado Freestyle"	2021	Riff Raff, Yelawolf	Turquoise Tornado
"Side Road Fresh (Remix)"	2021	Upchurch	Mud to Gold
