= Trae tha Truth discography =

Discography of Trae tha Truth

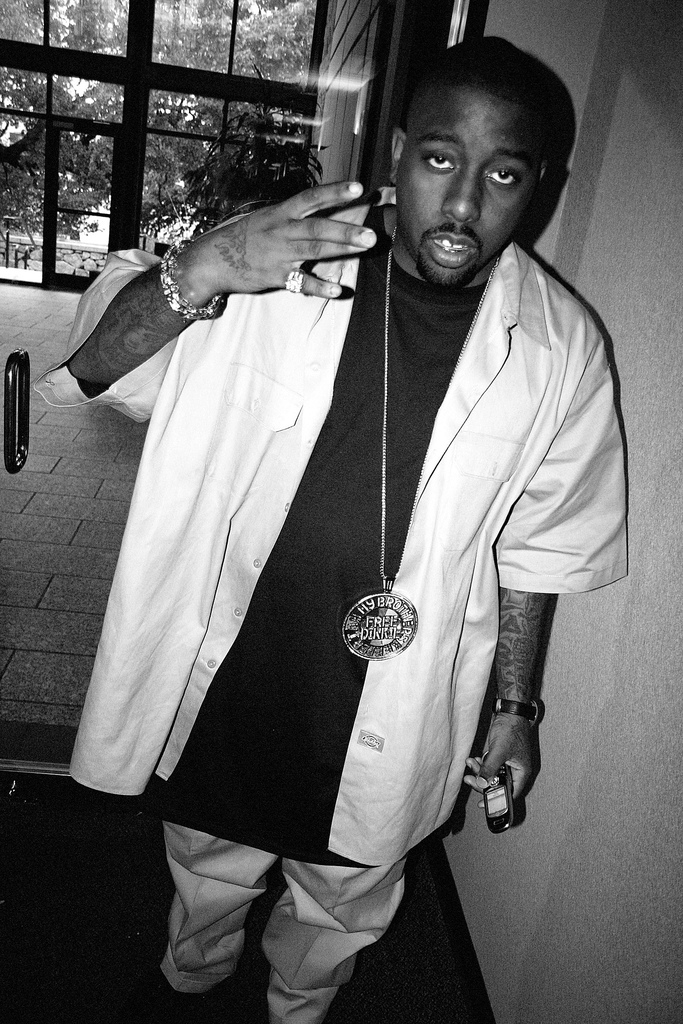
- Trae tha Truth in 2005
- Studio albums: 12
- Extended plays: 1
- Singles: 21
- Mixtapes: 32
- Guest appearances: 106

This is the discography of Trae tha Truth, an American rapper from Houston, Texas.

== Albums ==
=== Studio albums ===
Title	Album details	Peak chart positions			
Title	Album details	US	US R&B	US Rap	US Ind.
Losing Composure	Released: September 9, 2003; Label: G-Maab; Format: CD, digital download	—	—	—	—
Same Thing Different Day	Released: July 6, 2004; Label: G-Maab; Format: CD, digital download	—	51	—	—
Restless	Released: June 27, 2006; Label: G-Maab, Rap-A-Lot, Asylum; Format: CD, digital download	87	16	9	—
Life Goes On	Released: October 23, 2007; Label: G-Maab, Rap-A-Lot, Asylum; Format: CD, digital download	104	17	7	—
The Beginning	Released: October 14, 2008; Label: Rap-A-Lot; Format: CD, digital download	—	46	21	—
Street King	Released: July 12, 2011; Label: ABN, Fontana; Format: CD, digital download	—	38	23	43
Tha Truth	Released: July 24, 2015; Label: ABN, Grand Hustle, Empire; Format: CD, digital download	166	15	11	17
Tha Truth, Pt. 2	Released: February 5, 2016; Label: ABN, Grand Hustle, Empire; Format: CD, digital download	—	30	20	17
Tha Truth, Pt. 3	Released: July 21, 2017; Label: ABN, Grand Hustle, Empire; Format: CD, digital download	—	—	—	39
Hometown Hero	Released: March 16, 2018; Label: ABN, Empire; Format: CD, digital download	—	—	—	35
Exhale	Released: August 23, 2019; Label: ABN, Empire; Format: CD, digital download	—	—	—	—
Truth Season: The United Streets of America	Released: February 11, 2022; Label: ABN, Empire; Format: CD, digital download	—	—	—	—
Stuck in Motion	Released: October 20, 2023; Label: Self-released; Format: CD, digital download	—	—	—	—
Crowd Control	Released: August 23, 2024; Label: Self-released; Format: CD, digital download	—	—	—	—
Angel	Released: July 3, 2025; Label: Self-released; Format: CD, digital download	—	—	—	—
"—" denotes a title that did not chart, or was not released in that territory.

=== Collaborative albums ===
Title	Album details
Rise (with Guerilla Maab)	Released: 1999; Label: Resurrection; Format: CD, digital download
In the Mist of Guerillas (with Guerilla Maab)	Released: 2000; Label: Resurrection; Format: CD, digital download
Resurrected (with Guerilla Maab)	Released: 2002; Label: KMJ; Format: CD, digital download
Year of the Underdawgs (with Dougie D)	Released: 2003; Label: Resurrection; Format: CD, digital download
Assholes by Nature (with Z-Ro as ABN)	Released: 2003; Label: G-Maab; Format: CD, digital download
Vol. 3 (with S.L.A.B.)	Released: 2003; Label: G-Maab; Format: CD, digital download
Vol. 4 (with S.L.A.B.)	Released: 2004; Label: G-Maab; Format: CD, digital download
4.5 Plex (with S.L.A.B.)	Released: 2005; Label: G-Maab; Format: CD, digital download
The Anthem (with S.L.A.B.)	Released: 2006; Label: G-Maab; Format: CD, digital download
7 Years and Runnin' (with S.L.A.B.)	Released: 2006; Label: G-Maab; Format: CD, digital download
It Is What It Is (with Z-Ro as ABN)	Released: July 15, 2008; Label: G-Maab, Rap-A-Lot; Format: CD, digital download
Tapped In (with Mozzy)	Released: December 16, 2016; Label: ABN, Mozzy, Empire; Format: CD, digital download
Year of the Underdawgz Reloaded (with Dougie D)	Released: June 30, 2017; Label: Game Tyme; Format: CD, digital download
3d2 Again (with Dougie D)	Released: June 30, 2017; Label: Game Tyme; Format: CD, digital download
If You're Scared Stay Inside (with Mysonne)	Released: February 26, 2021; Label: Worldstar; Format: CD, digital download
Still Tapped In (with Mozzy)	Released: September 25, 2026; Label: ABN, Mozzy, Empire; Format: CD, digital download

== Extended plays ==
Title	EP details
The Tonite Show (with DJ Fresh)	Released: January 21, 2014; Label: Fresh in the Flesh, Empire; Format: CD, digital download
Farewell	Released: March 6, 2026; Label: Self-released; Format: Digital download

== Mixtapes ==
Title	Mixtape details
Return of the Streets	Released: 2005; Label: Self-released; Format: Digital download
Later Dayz	Released: November 7, 2006; Label: Self-released; Format: Digital download
On the Grind - Southwest General	Released: 2006; Label: Self-released; Format: Digital download
Dirty South Mixtape 5	Released: 2006; Label: Self-released; Format: Digital download
Tha Truth Show	Released: 2007; Label: Self-released; Format: Digital download
Asshole by Nature	Released: 2007; Label: Self-released; Format: Digital download
I Am Houston	Released: 2007; Label: Self-released; Format: Digital download
The Streets of the South Pt. 1	Released: 2008; Label: Self-released; Format: Digital download
The Diary of the Truth	Released: 2008; Label: Self-released; Format: Digital download
Street's Advocate	Released: November 15, 2008; Label: Self-released; Format: Digital download
The Streets of the South Pt. 2	Released: 2008; Label: Self-released; Format: Digital download
Both Sides of the Fence (with Rob G)	Released: 2009; Label: Self-released; Format: Digital download
Trae Day (with Lil Randy)	Released: 2009; Label: Self-released; Format: Digital download
The Incredible Truth	Released: October 24, 2009; Label: Self-released; Format: Digital download
Mr. Houston Pt. 2	Released: January 14, 2010; Label: Self-released; Format: Digital download
Traebute	Released: April 8, 2010; Label: Self-released; Format: Digital download
Reasonable Drought	Released: July 12, 2010; Label: Self-released; Format: Digital download
King of the Streets, Vol. 2	Released: July 28, 2010; Label: Self-released; Format: Digital download
Late Night King	Released: 2010; Label: Self-released; Format: Digital download
Can't Ban tha Truth	Released: September 30, 2010; Label: Self-released; Format: Digital download
48 Hours	Released: February 1, 2011; Label: Self-released; Format: Digital download
King of the Streets, Vol. 3	Released: May 3, 2011; Label: Self-released; Format: Digital download
Undisputed	Released: May 23, 2011; Label: Self-released; Format: Digital download
King of the Streets Freestyles	Released: January 17, 2012; Label: Self-released; Format: Digital download
Tha Blackprint	Released: August 29, 2012; Label: ABN, Grand Hustle; Format: Digital download
All-Star 2013: Take Flight	Released: February 15, 2013; Label: ABN, Grand Hustle; Format: Digital download
G.D.O.D. (Get Dough or Die) (with Grand Hustle)	Released: May 7, 2013; Label: Grand Hustle; Format: Digital download
I Am King	Released: November 25, 2013; Label: ABN, Grand Hustle; Format: Digital download
Flight School: All-Star 2014	Released: February 14, 2014; Label: ABN, Grand Hustle; Format: Digital download
Another 48 Hours	Released: June 27, 2016; Label: ABN, Grand Hustle; Format: Digital download
48 Hours Later	Released: June 27, 2018; Label: ABN, Empire; Format: Digital download
48 Hours After	Released: June 25, 2021; Label: ABN, Empire; Format: Digital download
Life n Pain	Released: March 20, 2022; Label: ABN, Empire; Format: Digital download

== Singles ==
=== As lead artist ===
List of singles, with selected chart positions, showing year released and album name
Title	Year	Peak chart positions			Album
Title	Year	US	US R&B	US Rap	Album
"Swang" (featuring Fat Pat and Big Hawk)	2005	—	—	—	Restless
"In the Hood" (featuring Yung Joc)	2005	—	64	—	Restless
"Screwed Up" (featuring Lil Wayne)	2007	—	71	—	Life Goes On
"Ghetto Queen" (featuring Rich Boy and Lloyd)	2008	—	—	—	non-album singles
"Something Real" (featuring Plies, Slim Thug, Brian Angel and Jodeci)	2010	—	115	—	non-album singles
"Inkredible" (featuring Lil Wayne and Rick Ross)	2010	—	—	—	non-album singles
"Getting Paid" (featuring Wiz Khalifa)	2011	—	—	—	Street King
"I'm On" (featuring Lupe Fiasco, Big Boi, Wale, Wiz Khalifa and MDMA)	2011	—	—	—	Street King
"I'm from Texas" (featuring Paul Wall, Z-Ro, Slim Thug, Bun B and Kirko Bangz)	2012	—	—	—	non-album singles
"Reckless" (featuring The LOX)	2014	—	—	—	non-album singles
"Try Me" (featuring Young Thug)	2014	—	—	—	non-album singles
"I Don't Give a F*ck" (featuring Rick Ross)	2015	—	—	—	Tha Truth
"Tricken Every Car I Get" (featuring Future and Boosie Badazz)	2015	—	—	—	Tha Truth
"Takers" (featuring Quentin Miller)	2015	—	—	—	Tha Truth, Pt. 2
"All Good" (featuring T.I., Rick Ross and Audio Push)	2016	—	—	—	Tha Truth, Pt. 2
"Slugs" (featuring Young Thug)	2016	—	—	—	Tha Truth, Pt. 2
"Changed on Me" (featuring Money Man)	2017	—	—	—	non-album single
"I'm On 3.0" (featuring T.I., Dave East, Tee Grizzley, Royce da 5'9", Curren$y, DRAM, Snoop Dogg, Fabolous, Rick Ross, Chamillionaire, G-Eazy, Styles P, E-40, Mark Morrison and Gary Clark, Jr.)	2017	—	—	—	Tha Truth, Pt. 3
"Take Me Back"	2017	—	—	—	Tha Truth, Pt. 3
"Thuggin" (featuring Young Thug and Skippa da Flippa)	2017	—	—	—	Tha Truth, Pt. 3
"Time for Change (Black Lives Matter)" (featuring T.I., Styles P, Mysonne, Ink, Anthony Hamilton, Conway the Machine, Krayzie Bone, E-40, David Banner, Bun B, Tamika Mallory and Lee Merritt)	2020	—	—	—	non-album single

== Guest appearances ==
List of non-single guest appearances, with other performing artists, showing year released and album name
Title	Year	Other artist(s)	Album
"Gorilla Maab"	1998	Z-Ro	G-Rapp The General: Military Mindz
"City of Killers"	1998	Z-Ro, Bam, T.A.Z.	Look What You Did to Me
"Are You Down?"	1998	Z-Ro, The Fakkulty & T.A.Z.	Look What You Did to Me
"Grip On Grain"	2000	G-Low, Z-Ro	The Last Man Standing
"Somebody Say Oh Yeah!"	2000	Big Hawk, Chris Ward, Mike D, Lil' Flip, Big Pokey, Lil' O, E.S.G., Z-Ro, Lil' Keke, C-Note, Mr. 3-2	Under Hawk's Wings
"I Found Me"	2001	Z-Ro	King of da Ghetto
"Haters Song"	2001	Z-Ro, Slimm Chance	King of da Ghetto
"In My Prime"	2001	Z-Ro, 9500 Woodfair	King of da Ghetto
"Make 'em Feel It"	2001	Big Hawk	HAWK
"FU 2"	2001	D-Drew, Godfather	Down South Still Holdin
"Push"	2001	D-Drew, Killa Kyleon, Aric	Down South Still Holdin
"Bump Too Much"	2002	Big Mello, Tony Montana	The Gift
"KMJ Killas"	2002	Big Mello, Cl'Che, Dougie D	The Gift
"Southside"	2002	Big Mello, Z-Ro, Ghetto, Cl'Che	The Gift
"Life And Times"	2002	Al-D, Shorty Mac, Ronnie Spencer	4 Da Green
"Hard Times"	2002	Z-Ro	Z-Ro
"Lost Another Soldier (Tribute To Big Mello)"	2002	Z-Ro, Tony Montana, Dougie D, Cl'Che	Life
"Who Could It Be"	2003	Z-Ro, Dougie D	Z-Ro Tolerance
"Out Here Grinding"	2003	Showtyme, B-1	Hustlen 4 Show
"Hard Tymez"	2003	Yukmouth, Tanya Herron, Z-Ro	Godzilla
"Oh No"	2004	Paul Wall	Chick Magnet
"Everyday"	2004	Z-Ro	The Life of Joseph W. McVey
"How You Wanna Handle This"	2004	K-Rino, Point Blank	The Hit List
"Signz Of Hate"	2005	K-Rino, Devin The Dude, Top Dog, Wicked Cricket	Fear No Evil
"Da Cops"	2005	Lil' Flip, Z-Ro	Kings of the South
"Never Take Me Alive"	2005	Lil' Flip, Z-Ro, Will-Lean, Black Al Capone	Kings of the South
"Don't Wanna Hurt Nobody"	2005	Z-Ro, Lil' Boss	Let the Truth Be Told
"1 Night"	2005	Z-Ro	Let the Truth Be Told
"Dem Boyz" (Remix)	2006	T-Weaponz, Shamrock	Dem Boyz (Single)
"Problems"	2006	Scarface	My Homies Part 2
"Ready 4 War"	2006	Lil' C, Archie Lee, Z-Ro, Dougie, Lil B, Jay'Ton, 3–2, Dyno	Slow, Loud and Bangin', Volume 3
"Not Gonna Leave"	2006	The Game, Paul Wall	—N/a
"Overstand Me"	2006	Pimp C, Chamillionaire	Pimpalation
"Shakedown"	2006	Celly Cel, C-Note, Anka Man	The Gumbo Pot
"Whip It (Street Fame)"	2006	Ras Kass, Southwest	Eat or Die
"Coming Home"	2007	Big Hawk, Devin The Dude, Chamillionaire	Endangered Species
"How You Like Me Now"	2007	Rob G	—N/a
"Life Ain't Change"	2007	Young Bleed	Once Upon a Time in Amedica
"So Throwed"	2007	Gator Main, The Ballplayas	Texas The Album
"Can't Sell Dope 4 Eva"	2008	Yukmouth, MC Eiht	Million Dollar Mouthpiece
"Pill Poppa"	2008	Big Moe, Mike D, J Dog	Unfinished Business
"Do It For H-Town"	2008	Chamillionaire, Slim Thug	Mixtape Messiah 4
"My Life"	2008	Chamillionaire, Slim Thug	Mixtape Messiah 4
"Welcome to Houston"	2009	Slim Thug, Chamillionaire, Mike Jones, Bun B, Paul Wall, Yung Redd, Lil' Keke, Z-Ro, Mike D, Big Pokey, Rob G, Lil' O, Pimp C	Boss of All Bosses
"Pressin' Them Buttons"	2009	Paul Wall, Lil' Keke	Fast Life
"Let's Ryde Together"	2010	DJ Kayslay, Trick-Trick, M.O.P., Tre Williams	More Than Just a DJ
"Still in the Hood"	2010	Jay Rock	Black Friday
"Mo' Gunz"	2010	Thug Lordz, Yukmouth, C-Bo	Thug Money
"Big Body Truck"	2010	Outlawz, Young Noble, E.D.I. Mean	The Lost Songs Vol. 1
"Bussin" (remix)	2011	Trouble, Yo Gotti, Waka Flocka Flame	—N/a
"Phone Numbers"	2011	Wiz Khalifa, Big Sean	Cabin Fever
"Ballin (Remix)"	2011	Lil Wayne, Young Jeezy	—N/a
"Money On The Dresser"	2011	Cardo & Gerald Walker	On Your Side
"Cocaine Mafia"	2011	French Montana	Coke Boys 2
"Grills Are Gold"	2011	OJ da Juiceman, Project Pat, 8Ball	Cook Muzik
"Blow My High"	2011	Outlawz, Young Buck	Killuminati 2K11
"Paranoid"	2011	Outlawz, Z-Ro, June Summers	Perfect Timing
"Head Rocked"	2011	Dorrough, Zillaman	Highlights
"Block Music"	2011	Freeway, Freddie Gibbs, Fred the Godson	The Intermission
"How Bout Dat"	2011	B.o.B, Future	E.P.I.C. (Every Play Is Crucial)
"Fuck Them Niggaz"	2012	Frenchie, Wooh Da Kid	French-Elo Anthony
"Franklins"	2012	Young Noble, Gudda Gudda, Hussein Fatal	Outlaw Rydahz Vol. 1
"Long Live the Pimp"	2012	Future	Pluto
"We Getting Money"	2012	Jadakiss	Consignment
"Wow" (Remix)	2012	Bo Deal, Waka Flocka Flame, French Montana, Twista, Paperboy	The Chicago Code 3: Revelations
"This Is The Life"	2012	J-Lie	Ears First, Hearts Next
"Fall Back"	2012	Juvenile, Z-Ro	Rejuvenation
"Niggaz Winnin"	2012	Crooked I, Melody Angel	Psalm 82:V6
"Feelin' Myself"	2012	Slim Dunkin, D-Bo	Block Illegal 2: My Brother's Keeper
"All Eyes On Me"	2012	Ro Ransom	Ransomnia
"Put That On Everythang"	2012	8Ball, Styles P, Ebony Love	Premro
"Fight Music"	2012	Mike WiLL Made It, T.I., Juicy J	Est. In 1989 (Part 2)
"H-Town"	2012	Boogz Boogetz	C.O.O.L. (Creating Our Own Lane)
"Sittin' On Top Of The World"	2012	Flatline	Respect My Gangsta
"Throw Down"	2012	Styles P, Fred The Godson	The Diamond Life Project
"Bands Flow"	2012	Slim Thug	Thug Thursday
"I Got Em"	2012	Waka Flocka Flame	Salute Me or Shoot Me 4 (Banned from America)
"Interstate"	2012	Ransom	Winter’s Coming
"Black Diamonds"	2012	Rocky Diamonds	The Diamond Life 3
"Mobbin" (Remix)	2012	Maino, Busta Rhymes, Jim Jones, Gucci Mane, Yo Gotti	The Mafia
"Blessed To Be Here"	2012	Blood Raw	Raw Redemption
"We Got Next"	2012	Lagato	—N/a
"Dead Man"	2012	Gucci Mane, Young Scooter	Trap God
"Night & Day"	2012	Lloyd, Lil Wayne, DJ Scream	The Playboy Diaries
"Like Dat"	2012	Nelly	Scorpio Season
"She Shoppin'"	2012	2 Pistols	Arrogant
"Enemies"	2012	Gudda Gudda, Crooked I, Ace Hood	Guddaville 3
"Count Me Out"	2012	Young Noble, Akk & Aleah Paige	Son of God
"Arch It Up"	2012	Omarion	Care Package
"Stan Up Niggas"	2012	Bo Deal, BFN	Welcome To Klanville
"Rollin'"	2012	The Game, Kanye West, Z-Ro, Paul Wall, Slim Thug	—N/a
"No More Pain"	2012	Philthy Rich, Billy Blue	N.E.R.L. (Not Enough Real Niggas Left)
"Dope & Champagne"	2012	Big Kuntry King	Dope & Champagne
"Check This Dig That"	2012	T.I.	Trouble Man: Heavy Is the Head
"Truth Hurts"	2012	Juvenile, Ivan, Dorrough	Juvie Tuesdays
"Lord Help Me"	2012	Trouble, Alley Boy	This That Southern Smoke Vol. 2
"I Ain't Hidden" (Remix)	2012	Smoke, T-Pain	K.A.N.G.
"Under Oath"	2012	Chip	London Boy
"Who U Gon Turn To?"	2013	Mistah F.A.B.	I Found My Backpack 3
"No Imposters"	2013	DJ Kay Slay, N.O.R.E.	Grown Man Hip Hop Part 2 (Sleepin' With The Enemy)
"Round Da Corner"	2013	Cyhi the Prynce	Ivy League: Kick Back
"Been About It"	2013	Chaz Gotti, Lil Durk	Voice of Dunk
"Maniac"	2013	Wooh Da Kid, Bo Deal	Full Metal Jacket
"Storm of the South"	2013	Mack Maine	Freestyle 102: No Pens or Pads
"Want War"	2013	Ar-Ab	M.U.D. Musik (Motivation Under Distress)
"Fuck Em All"	2013	L.D.	Owls & Spaceships
"Ballin'"	2013	Lil Snupe	R.N.I.C.
"I Wish It Was Music"	2013	Wyclef Jean, T.I.	April Showers
"H-Town"	2013	Dizzee Rascal, Bun B	The Fifth
"Blood Money"	2013	Cartel MGM	Money, Power, Respect
"Err-Body"	2013	T.I., B.o.B, Young Dro, Chip, Shad da God	G.D.O.D. (Get Dough or Die)
"2 Fucks"	2013	T.I., Chip, Travi$ Scott, Young Dro, B.o.B	G.D.O.D. (Get Dough or Die)
"Problems"	2013	T.I., Mac Boney, Problem, Young Dro, B.o.B	G.D.O.D. (Get Dough or Die)
"Yeap!"	2013	T.I., B.o.B, Young Dro	G.D.O.D. (Get Dough or Die)
"Away"	2013	T.I., Spodee	G.D.O.D. (Get Dough or Die)
"Punch Out"	2013	Blanco, The Jacka	Game Over
"Count It Up"	2013	D Dash, Bo Deal	Mill B4 Dinner Time
"Broke Dem Boyz Off"	2013	Dorrough, Kirko Bangz	Shut The City Down
"Climax"	2013	Jackie Chain, Jihad	Bruce Lean Chronicles 2
"No More Pain"	2013	Philthy Rich, Billy Blue	N.E.R.N.L. 2
"Hooligans"	2013	Young Dro, B.o.B.	Day Two
"Help Me"	2013	Trouble, Alley Boy	The Return of December 17th
"Last of a Dying Breed"	2013	Runway Richy	Uh-Oh!
"With the BS"	2013	Tech N9ne, Big Scoob, Red Café	Something Else
"Pink Bottles"	2013	Messy Marv, Dott Myers	Playboy Gangsta
"Guns"	2013	Caskey, ClicKlak	The Transient Classics
"Hard Times"	2013	Loaded Lux	You Gon Get This Work
"Expiration Date"	2013	Celly Cel, Spice 1	Morphine
"Jump on My Niggaz"	2013	DJ Paul, Drumma Boy	Clash of the Titans
"Blow My High"	2013	The Outlawz, Young Buck	Warrior Music
"The Legendary DJ Screw"	2013	Bun B, E.S.G., C-Note, Lil' O, Z-Ro, Big Hawk	Trill OG: The Epilogue
"Swangin" (Remix)	2013	Stalley, Lil' Keke, Chamillionaire, Bun B, E.S.G.	—N/a
"Ghetto Survivor"	2014	DJ Kay Slay, Trick-Trick, Troy Ave, Termanology	The Rise of a City
"They Trippin'"	2014	Turk, Quick, Bad Azz	Reflamed
"Got Damn"	2014	Doe B, Young Dro	D.O.A.T. 3 (Definition of a Trapper)
"All Gas"	2014	Doe B, T.I., Problem, Shad da God	D.O.A.T. 3 (Definition of a Trapper)
"Wat Dat Mouf Do?"	2014	Lil Duval	—N/a
"Niggaz Hate"	2014	DJ Kay Slay, Lock Smith, Jay Rock	The Last Hip Hop Disciple
"Who We Is (OG)"	2014	Doe B, Spodee, T.I., Young Dro	G.D.O.D. II
"What You Gon' Do Bout It"	2014	Zuse, T.I., Spodee	G.D.O.D. II
"Ain't Both (MLK)"	2014	T.I., Young Dro, Spodee, Doe B	G.D.O.D. II
"You Don't Know Nothin' About Me"	2014	Doe B, T.I.	G.D.O.D. II
"Puttin in Work"	2014	Mitchelle'l, Young Dro, Doe B, 5Mics, Yung Booke	G.D.O.D. II
"Check"	2014	Problem, Young Dro, T.I.	G.D.O.D. II
"On Doe, On Phil"	2014	T.I.	Paperwork
"No Nigga Like Me"	2014	Nipsey Hussle	Mailbox Money
"What Up"	2014	Daz Dillinger, MJG	Weed Money
"World So Cold"	2015	DC Young Fly	Supplyin Pressure
"Ain't Gone Fool Me"	2015	Young Buck	Before The Beast
"Hypnotize"	2015	Mike G	—N/a
"The IllEST, the realEST, the trillEST"	2015	MGK, Bun B	Fuck It
"I Can't"	2015	Turk, Bo Deal	Get Money Stay Real 2
"Scorpion Death Drop"	2016	The Sparks Foundation, A$AP Twelvyy, Project Pat, Smoke DZA	Parts Unknown
"Line It Up"	2017	Mozzy, Jadakiss, Dave East, E Mozzy	Fake Famous
"Pull Me In"	2017	Berner	Sleepwalking
"Same as Us"	2017	Tokyo Jetz, T.I.	Viral
"My Brudda 2X"	2018	Mozzy, Celly Ru	Gangland Landlord
"Real Nigga"	2018	Roscoe Dash	5thy5ive
