= Peezy =

Peezy may refer to:

- J Peezy (born 1977), American rapper
- OMB Peezy (born 1997), American rapper from Sacramento, California
- Pz' (born 2003), American rapper and fashion model whose stage name is sometimes stylized as P3ezy
- Peezy, American rapper from Detroit and mentor to Rio da Yung OG
