= Fresh Caesar =

American rapper

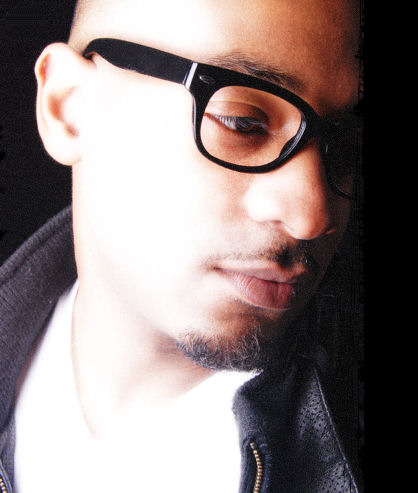
- Fresh Caesar

Background information
- Born: Courtney Smith; 1978 (age 47–48); Oakland, California
- Origin: San Jose, California, United States
- Genres: Hip Hop
- Occupations: Rapper, song writer, entrepreneur
- Years active: 1998–present
- Label: APB Entertainment
- Website: freshcaesar.com

Courtney Smith, better known by his stage name Fresh Caesar, is an American rapper, song writer and entrepreneur. The artist Fresh Caesar first emerged on the hip hop scene in the 2009 release of Big Von presents Kaz Kyzah: Gofessional 2. In less than 2 years since his first appearance, Fresh Caesar has released 2 highly successful Mixtapes; The Breakthrough Vol. 1 and 2.

In October 2011, Fresh Caesar was featured alongside rappers Paul Wall, Mistah F.A.B., Hopsin, and J Peezy in a battle rap mobile game called Battle Rap Stars.

== Discography ==
Mix Tapes

- 2008: "Pursuit of Happyness"
- 2010: "The Breakthrough Vol. 1"
- 2011: "The Breakthrough Vol. 2"

=== Video games ===
- 2011: Battle Rap Stars for iPhone and Android
