= Jump shot =

Jump shot or jumpshot may refer to:

- Jump shot (basketball)
- Jump shot (cue sports)
- Jump Shot Media, an American mobile game developer
- "Jumpshot", a song by Dawin, 2016
- "Jump Shots", a song by Reks from The Greatest X, 2016
