= Bizzy Body =

- "Bizzy Body" Single cover

Single by Paul Wall featuring Webbie and Mouse

from the album Fast Life
- Released: December 8, 2008
- Recorded: 2008
- Genre: Southern rap, hip hop
- Length: 4:20
- Label: Asylum Records; Swishahouse
- Songwriters: Jeremy Varnard Allen, Travis Farris, Webster Gradney, Paul Wall

Paul Wall featuring Webbie and Mouse singles chronology
"I'm Throwed" (2007)	"Bizzy Body" (2008)	"Lemon Drop" (2009)

"Bizzy Body" is the first single by Houston rapper Paul Wall from his studio album Fast Life. It was released on December 8, 2008, through Asylum.

== Track listings and formats ==
Digital download single

1. "Bizzy Body"
