= I'm On =

2011 Trae the Truth single

Single by Trae tha Truth featuring Lupe Fiasco, Big Boi, Wale, Wiz Khalifa and MDMA

from the album Street King
- Released: December 6, 2011
- Recorded: 2011
- Genre: Hip hop
- Length: 4:36
- Label: ABN Entertainment
- Songwriters: Frazier Thompson; Cameron Thomaz; Victor Folarin; Wasalu Jaco; Antwan Patton; Jason Boyd
- Producer: CyFyre

Trae singles chronology
| "Gettin' Paid" (2016) | "I'm On" (2011) | "I'm from Texas" (2012) |

Lupe Fiasco singles chronology
| "I Don't Wanna Care Right Now" (2011) | "I'm On" (2011) | "Angels & Stars" (2012) |

Big Boi singles chronology
| "You Ain't No DJ" (2010) | "I'm On" (2011) | "Gossip" (2012) |

Wale singles chronology
| "Lotus Flower Bomb" (2011) | "I'm On" (2011) | "In & Out" (2012) |

Wiz Khalifa singles chronology
| "Young, Wild & Free" (2011) | "I'm On" (2011) | "Till I Die" (2012) |

MDMA singles chronology
| "Cupcakin'" (2011) | "I'm On" (2011) | "Would You Ever" (2017) |

"I'm On" is a song by American rapper Trae tha Truth featuring fellow American rappers Wiz Khalifa, Lupe Fiasco, Big Boi, & Wale and American singer Poo Bear, also known as MDMA. The song was released as a digital download on December 6, 2011. "I'm On" originally appeared on Trae's album Street King, only featuring Lupe Fiasco, Big Boi, Wale and MDMA. The song was later released as a single adding Wiz Khalifa on December 6, 2011. On February 3, 2012, a remix entitled "I'm On 2.0" was released, replacing the featured artists with British singer Mark Morrison and American rappers Big K.R.I.T., Jadakiss, J. Cole, Kendrick Lamar, B.o.B, Tyga, Gudda Gudda, and Bun B.

== Track listing ==
Digital single

| No. | Title | Writer(s) | Producer(s) | Length |
|---|---|---|---|---|
| 1. | "I'm On (Single Version)" (featuring Lupe Fiasco, Big Boi, Wale, Wiz Khalifa and MDMA) | Frazier Thompson; Cameron Thomaz; Victor Folarin; Wasalu Jaco; Antwan Patton; Jason Boyd | CyFyre | 4:37 |

== Music video ==
A music video of the song was shot by Philly Fly Boy in Houston, Texas. It premiered on YouTube on January 9, 2012.

== I'm On 2.0 ==
"I'm On 2.0"

Song by Trae featuring Big K.R.I.T., Jadakiss, J. Cole, Kendrick Lamar, B.o.B, Tyga, Gudda Gudda, Bun B and Mark Morrison

from the album Tha Blackprint
- Released: February 3, 2012 (leaked)
- Genre: Hip hop
- Length: 5:02
- Label: ABN Entertainment
- Songwriters: Frazier Thompson; Justin Scott; Jason Phillips; Jermaine Cole; Kendrick Lamar; Bobby Simmons; Michael Nguyen-Stevenson; Carl Lilly Jr.; Bernard Freeman; Mark Morrison
- Producer: CyFyre

A remix of the song leaked on the internet on February 3, 2012. The song features an updated but similar instrumental. It features artists Big K.R.I.T., Mark Morrison, Jadakiss, J. Cole, Kendrick Lamar, B.o.B, Tyga, Gudda Gudda and Bun B. The remix samples the song "Return of the Mack" by Mark Morrison. A video was released in May 2012 for the remix. It featured cameos from many rappers including T.I., Wiz Khalifa, Juelz Santana, Ludacris, Meek Mill, Future, Ace Hood, DJ Drama, Gucci Mane, Shawty Lo, Wale, Paul Wall, Z-Ro, Styles P, Cee-Lo Green, Iggy Azalea, 2 Chainz and many others. The record was cited by media as one of the biggest collaborations ever, and the biggest rap video of 2012. MTV's RapFix announced that the video was MTV's Jam of the Week on the week it was released.

== I'm On 3.0 ==
"I'm On 3.0" was released on June 23, 2017 and featured T.I., Dave East, Tee Grizzley, Royce da 5'9", Currensy, DRAM, Snoop Dogg, Fabolous, Rick Ross, Chamillionaire, G-Eazy, Styles P, E-40, Mark Morrison (who previously appeared on the second entry in the series) & Gary Clark Jr. A music video was released in January 2019.

== I'm On 4.0 ==
"I'm On 4.0" is the most recent entry in the "I'm On" series, releasing on January 3, 2025. The song features Busta Rhymes, Ty Dolla Sign, Jeezy, DMX, Jay Rock, Joyner Lucas, Method Man, D Smoke, Chance the Rapper, G Herbo, and Mark Morrison (who previously appeared on the second and third entries in the series). Jay Rock's former Black Hippy groupmate Kendrick Lamar previously appeared in the second entry in the series.
