= Can't Ban tha Truth =

Can't Ban Tha Truth

Mixtape by Trae tha Truth
- Released: October 5, 2010
- Recorded: 2009–2010
- Genre: Southern hip hop
- Length: 1:06:57
- Label: G-Maab Ent.

Can't Ban Tha Truth is a 2010 mixtape released by American rapper Trae tha Truth. It was hosted by Evil Empire and DJ Folk.

== Track listing ==
1. "Can't Ban Tha Truth Intro" 3:47
2. "Can't Ban Tha Truth" (featuring Young Quis & Brian Angel) 3:30
3. "Gin Cop A Drop" 4:09
4. "Lil Duval Speaks" 0:38
5. "General" (featuring Brian Angel) 4:41
6. "Hood Nights" (featuring Gudda Gudda & Jae Millz) 3:16
7. "Duece's & Trae's" (featuring Young Buck & Big Pokey) 4:49
8. "I Got This" (featuring Young Jeezy) 3:43
9. "Mama C Speaks" 2:36
10. "The Radio Wont Play This" (featuring Wyclef) 4:05
11. "Bad Dont Seem So Wrong" (featuring Lupe Fiasco) 4:41
12. "Pimp C Speaks On 97.9" 2:46
13. "Thats Fo Real" 3:45
14. "Gangsta 4 Life" (featuring Rihanna) 3:14
15. "Young Turk Calls From Jail" 1:35
16. "Please Respect It" 4:20
17. "Tear" 3:47
18. "Still My Nigga" 4:02
19. "What It Is" 3:35
