= Same Thing Different Day =

Studio album by Trae
- Released: July 6, 2004
- Genre: Southern hip hop
- Label: G-Maab
- Producers: Q-Stone; Dallas Blocker; Mike Dean; Happy Perez

Trae chronology
Losing Composure (2003)	Same Thing Different Day (2004)	Restless (2006)

Professional ratings
Review scores
Source	Rating
RapReviews	8/10

Same Thing Different Day is the second studio album by American rapper Trae. It was released on July 6, 2004, by Trae's independently-owned record label, G-Maab Entertainment. The album was re-packaged into four discs with the first disc being the original release of the album, but also includes tracks in the first-half from its album's original release onto the second disc and each tracks in the second-half from its album's original release onto the third disc being chopped and screwed; as well as the fourth disc being a DVD.

== Track listing ==
No.	Title	Producer(s)	Length
1.	"Intro"	Q-Stone	2:09
2.	"Asshole By Nature"	Q-Stone	3:17
3.	"Screwed Up Click" (featuring Big Hawk and Mr. 3-2)	Q-Stone	3:49
4.	"Don't Fake" (featuring Bun B and Devin the Dude)	Q-Stone	3:46
5.	"Stay Out My Way" (featuring Bill Cook, Jay'Ton, Lil' B, and Lil' Boss)	Q-Stone	5:25
6.	"In the Ghetto" (featuring Russell Lee, Spice 1, Yung Redd, and Lil' Boss)	Q-Stone	4:39
7.	"Same Thing Different Day"	Q-Stone	4:29
8.	"I've Been Hustlin'" (featuring Dallas Blocker)	Q-Stone	4:32
9.	"Had Enough" (featuring Mack Biggers)	Q-Stone	4:02
10.	"'Til The Day I Drop"	Q-Stone	4:21
11.	"Sittin' on Top of the World"	Q-Stone	4:44
12.	"Oh No Reloaded" (featuring Paul Wall)	Dallas Blocker	4:17
13.	"Time After Time" (featuring Dallas Blocker)	Q-Stone	5:00
14.	"Let Me Live" (featuring Z-Ro and Shyna)	Mike Dean	4:07
15.	"But What About Today"	Q-Stone	3:53
16.	"On Your Own" (featuring C-Loc and Shyna)	Happy Perez	4:14
17.	"Don't Need Y'all"	Q-Stone	5:07
18.	"Special" (featuring Shyna)	Q-Stone	4:33

== Charts ==
Chart (2004)	Peak position
US Top R&B/Hip-Hop Albums (Billboard)	51
