= Dallas Blocker =

American singer, producer and songwriter

- Also known as: Dallas Blocker, Dallas
- Born: Nathan Blocker; June 6, 1984 (age 42); Dallas, Texas, United States
- Origin: Houston, Texas, United States
- Genres: R&B, hip hop, pop
- Occupations: Singer, producer, songwriter
- Years active: 2004–present
- Labels: Latium Records, TF Records
- Website: officialdallasblocker.com

Dallas Blocker (born Nathan Blocker a.k.a. Dallas) is an American singer, producer and songwriter. After signing with Latium Records in 2004, Blocker later formed independent label Blockerboy Music LLC on which he released the EP Alone, the album Love and Lust (in Japan) and the Billboard chart hit "Rock Ya Body".

== Early life ==
Blocker was born and reared for a short time in Dallas, Texas by his mother, but later joined his father at age seven in Trinity Gardens – a Northeast Houston, Texas neighborhood. He began singing and performing in church at a young age, and eventually chose the stage name “Dallas” to acknowledge both the city in which he was born and his mother, a long-time Dallas, Texas resident.

== Musical beginnings ==
While acclimating to life in Houston, Blocker busied himself singing, learning to produce music and penning his own lyrics. While attending Kashmere High School and during college, Blocker was a member of a male R&B group, which included Brian Angel of Day26. The group environment allowed Blocker to use his skills as a songwriter, producer and lead vocalist to amass the interest of new fans and local music industry executives. He also was the choir director at Fallbrook Church

== Career: Collaborations ==
Blocker has collaborated with many noted musical artists throughout his career, including producer Bryan Michael Cox; lead vocalist of R&B group H-Town the late Kevin “Dino” Conner; rappers Bun B, Rick Ross, J-Dawg, Z-Ro, Slim Thug, Tum Tum, Lil Flip, Mike Jones, Paul Wall, and Trae; and several KBXX DJs. His work includes lead vocals, production and writing on "Get It Girl", which is featured on the Bring It On: All or Nothing music soundtrack, and "After Da Club" with the late rapper Hawk. It was this smash hit that allowed Blocker to forge a relationship with Latium Records, which hosts artist Pitbull and formerly hosted artists Chamillionaire, Slim Thug, Frankie J, Natalie and Baby Bash.

== Career: Solo Efforts ==
In 2008, Blocker took control of his music career by establishing his independent label Blockerboy Music LLC following a year under contract, and later, a voluntary release from Latium Records. With the release of Alone (EP) and the subsequent release of the Love & Lust album in Japan, Blocker soon headlined Japan's Save R&B tour in September 2009 and opened for R&B star Babyface at Houston's Arena Theater in August 2010. In 2010, Blocker's smash hit “Rock Ya Body,” produced by Texas hit-making duo Beanz N Kornbread, debuted on Billboard’s Top 100 chart at #75 and was heard by more than two million listeners weekly with heavy radio play in Florida, Georgia, Louisiana, Oklahoma and Texas. The single spent 20 weeks on the Billboard charts. To accompany the single's wave of success, the “Rock Ya Body” video, which was directed by Michael Kimbrew in association with TF Records, was also released in 2010, and featured Farrah Franklin (formerly of Destiny's Child), Montana Fishburne and Orlando Brown. In 2011, Blocker released the single “Out Da Club” featuring Diamond; soon after, the single's video—featuring Z-Ro and directed by JC Visuals in association with Blockerboy Music LLC—followed.

== Discography ==
=== Albums ===
- 2008: Alone (EP)
- 2009: Love and Lust

=== Singles ===
- 2010: “Rock Ya Body”
- 2013: “Elevator”
- 2013: “Heels Up”

=== Singles (Featured Artist) ===
- 2004: "I've Been Hustlin" by Trae (featuring Dallas Blocker) – Same Thing Different Day
- 2004: "Time After Time" by Trae (featuring Dallas Blocker) – Same Thing Different Day
- 2006: "The Rain" by Trae (featuring Dallas Blocker & Shyna) – Restless
- 2007: “After the Club” by Mista Madd (featuring Hawk & Dallas Blocker)
- 2010: "My City" by Paul Wall (featuring Dallas Blocker & Yo Gotti) – Heart of a Champion
- 2010: "Beat It Up" by Slim Thug (featuring Dallas Blocker) – Tha Thug Show
- 2011: "Pig Feet" by Z-Ro (featuring Dallas Blocker) – Meth
- 2011: “Hold of Me” by GT Mayne (featuring Dallas Blocker and Z-Ro)

=== Production ===
- 2004: "Oh No Reloaded" by Trae (featuring Paul Wall) – Same Thing Different Day
