= Battle Rap Stars =

- Developer(s): Jump Shot Media
- Publisher(s): Jump Shot Media
- Platform(s): iOS, mobile phone, miscellaneous internet connected device
- Genre(s): Strategy

Battle Rap Stars is a mobile rap battle game for iOS created by Jump Shot Media that uses inputted audio to evaluate and score.

In Battle Rap Stars, gamers must battle rap against pre-recorded rappers featured in the game. Rappers featured in the game include Paul Wall, Mistah F.A.B., Hopsin, J Peezy and Fresh Caesar. The criteria required to beat each round gets harder as users progress through the game. The more in rhythm the user is with the beat, the higher the score.

== See also ==
- Karaoke Revolution
- SingStar
- Def Jam Rapstar
