= The Beginning (Trae album) =

Studio album by Trae
- Released: October 14, 2008
- Recorded: 2007–08
- Studio: Trae's House (Houston, TX)
- Genre: Southern hip hop
- Label: Rap-A-Lot
- Producers: J. Prince (exec.); Trae (also exec.); Q-Stone; Jake One; Mike Dean; Mr. Rogers

Trae chronology
Life Goes On (2007)	The Beginning (2008)	Street King (2011)

The Beginning is the fifth studio album by American rapper Trae. It was released on October 14, 2008, by Rap-A-Lot Records. The album features guest appearances from Dallas Blocker, Jay'Ton, Khujo Goodie, Lil' Boss, Paul Wall, Russell Lee, Slim Thug, and Z-Ro.

== Track listing ==
No.	Title	Producer(s)	Length
1.	"Watch Ova Momma"	Mike Dean	3:52
2.	"Problem, Pt. 2"	Q-Stone	5:20
3.	"Against the World"	Q-Stone	3:53
4.	"Don't Pay Off"	Q-Stone	4:14
5.	"G Code" (featuring Khujo Goodie)	Jake One	3:05
6.	"G Shit" (featuring Paul Wall and Jay'Ton)	Q-Stone	3:26
7.	"Hold On" (featuring Dallas Blocker)	Q-Stone	3:45
8.	"Wake Up" (featuring Slim Thug and Z-Ro)	Q-Stone	3:44
9.	"My Life"	Q-Stone	3:20
10.	"I'd Rather Be" (featuring Russell)	Q-Stone	3:57
11.	"This Can't Be Life" (featuring Dallas Blocker and Lil' Boss)	Q-Stone	4:59
12.	"White Bricks" (featuring Lil' Boss)	Mr. Rogers	3:22

== Charts ==
Chart (2008)	Peak position
US Top R&B/Hip-Hop Albums (Billboard)	46
US Top Rap Albums (Billboard)	21
