= Fast Life (Paul Wall album) =

Studio album by Paul Wall
- Released: May 12, 2009
- Recorded: 2008–09
- Studio: Studio 30 Thirteen (Houston, TX)
- Genre: Southern hip hop
- Label: Swishahouse; Asylum
- Producer: Amadeus; Beanz-N-Kornbread; Gennessee; Happy Perez; I.N.F.O.; Mouse; NOVA; Travis Barker; X-Fyle; Yung Chill

Paul Wall chronology
Get Money, Stay True (2007)	Fast Life (2009)	Heart of a Champion (2010)

Singles from Fast Life
- 1. "Bizzy Body" Released: December 2, 2008; 2. "Lemon Drop" Released: July 13, 2009; 3. "Got to Get It" Released: July 23, 2009; 4. "I Need Mo" Released: September 24, 2009

Fast Life is the fourth studio album by American rapper Paul Wall. It was released on May 12, 2009, by Swishahouse and Asylum Records. Production on the album was handled by Beanz-N-Kornbread, Travis Barker, X-Fyle, Antwan "Amadeus" Thompson, Gennessee Lewis, Happy Perez, I.N.F.O., NOVA, Mouse, and Yung Chill, with G-Dash and Michael "5000" Watts serving as executive producers.

The album features guest appearances from Z-Ro, Baby Bash, Gorilla Zoe, Kobe, Krizz Kaliko, Lil' Keke, Marty James, Mouse, Tech N9ne, the Federation, Too Short, Trae, Webbie, Yung Chill, Yung Joc, and Yung Redd. Skinhead Rob also provides guest vocals; he and Barker performed with Wall as Expensive Taste.

== Background ==
Paul Wall described Fast Life as the project was underway:

I really stepped it up a lot lyrically because I wanted this record to show real strength and emotion... We worked with a lot of new producers... so they'll get to see a lot of different vibes that they might have not seen with me with past albums. Subject matter we went a little more in-depth, talked about a lot of different things that I never really spoke on—I might have mentioned it here and there but never really made whole songs about. I had a lot of fun working on the album.

"You're going to hear in-depth topics," he says, adding that he's been recording nonstop for the album for the last two years, a feat that has given him more than 50 songs to choose from. "You'll hear some stuff that you might not be used to hearing."

== Singles ==
The album's lead single, called "Bizzy Body", was released on December 2, 2008. The song features a guest appearance from Webbie and Mouse, who produced the track. The music video premiered, via MySpace, on March 27, 2009.

The album's second single, "Lemon Drop", was released on the same day as the music video on July 13. The song features a guest appearance from Baby Bash, while the song's production was handled by Gennessee Lewis.

The album's third single, "Got to Get It", premiered, along with a music video, on July 23. The song was produced by Beanz-N-Kornbread.

The album's fourth and final single, "I Need Mo", was released on the same day as the music video on September 24. The song features Kobe, with Travis Barker producing. Wall shot the video with his iPhone.

== Critical reception ==
Professional ratings
Review scores
Source	Rating
AllMusic	3/5 stars
HipHopDX	3/5
RapReviews	7/10
XXL	3/5

Alex Thornton of HipHopDX gave praise to Wall for delivering his "usual wit" throughout the tracklist, while also revealing "unexpected musicality" on "I'm Clean". While being mixed on the club tracks, Thornton concluded that "Fast Life is one of the better albums from [Paul] Wall and definitely has a handful of gems." AllMusic's David Jeffries was critical of the record's "B-plus material" lacking the Swishahouse sheen from previous songs, but praised Wall for showing reflective introspection, highlighting "Daddy Wasn't Home" as the standout, concluding that: "Even without the epic single, it is interesting to hear Wall's perspective shifting and his horizons expanding." Jonathan Bonanno of XXL wrote, "What Paul lacks in substance, he makes up for with fun-loving, trunk-poppin' anthems. Although his latest lacks the fuel for a full lap 'round the fast life, big homie can always just pump the brakes and drive slow."

== Track listing ==
No.	Title	Writer(s)	Producer(s)	Length
1.	"I Need Mo" (featuring Kobe)	Paul Slayton; Brian Honeycutt; Travis Barker; Rob Aston; Lewis Kinoshi; Travis Farris	Barker	3:58
2.	"Got to Get It"	P. Slayton; Donald Johnson, Jr.; Kenneth Roy; Farris	Beanz-N-Kornbread	4:36
3.	"Bizzy Body" (featuring Webbie and Mouse)	P. Slayton; Webster Gradney, Jr.; Jeremy Allen; Farris	Mouse	4:16
4.	"Lemon Drop" (featuring Baby Bash)	P. Slayton; Ron Bryant; Genevieve Goings; Gennessee Lewis; Crystal Slayton; D. Parmar	Gennessee	2:53
5.	"Fly" (featuring Yung Joc and Gorilla Zoe)	P. Slayton; Jasiel Robinson; Alonzo Mathis; Antwan Thompson; Kinoshi	Amadeus	3:55
6.	"I Grind" (featuring Marty James)	P. Slayton; Marty Garton, Jr.; Nathan Perez; Kinoshi; Farris	Happy Perez	4:10
7.	"Daddy Wasn't Home"	P. Slayton; Johnson, Jr.; Roy; Farris	Beanz-N-Kornbread	4:54
8.	"Pop One of These" (featuring Too $hort, Skinhead Rob, and the Federation)	P. Slayton; Todd Shaw; Aston; Anthony Caldwell; Thomas Jackson; Barker	Barker	3:32
9.	"One Hundred" (featuring Z-Ro and Yung Redd)	P. Slayton; Joseph McVey; Christopher Gallien; Howard Metoyer	X-Fyle	3:16
10.	"Pressin' Them Buttons" (featuring Trae and Lil' Keke)	P. Slayton; Frasier Thompson; Marcus Edwards; John Christopher; Scott Novelli	I.N.F.O.; NOVA	3:47
11.	"I'm Clean" (featuring Z-Ro)	P. Slayton; McVey; Johnson, Jr.; Roy; Kinoshi; Farris	Beanz-N-Kornbread	4:59
12.	"Sumn' Like a Pimp" (featuring Tech N9NE and Krizz Kaliko)	P. Slayton; Aaron Yates; Samuel Watson; Metoyer	X-Fyle	5:28
13.	"Look at Me Now" (featuring Yung Chill)	P. Slayton; Isaac Yowman; C. Slayton; Kinoshi; Farris	Yung Chill	4:47

Bonus track
No.	Title	Producer(s)	Length
14.	"1, 2, 3, 4" (featuring Pitbull)	Play-N-Skillz	2:58

== Personnel ==
- Paul Michael "Paul Wall" Slayton — vocals
- Brian "Kobe" Honeycutt — vocals (track 1)
- Webster "Webbie" Gradney — vocals (track 3)
- Jeremy "Mouse" Allen — vocals & producer (track 3)
- Ron "Baby Bash" Bryant — vocals (track 4)
- Jasiel "Yung Joc" Robinson — vocals (track 5)
- Alonzo "Gorilla Zoe" Mathis — vocals (track 5)
- Marty James Garton Jr. — vocals (track 6)
- Todd "Too $hort" Shaw — vocals (track 8)
- Robert "Skinhead Rob" Aston — vocals (track 8)
- Anthony "Goldie Gold" Caldwell — vocals (track 8)
- Thomas "Stressmatic" Jackson — vocals (track 8)
- Joseph "Z-Ro" McVey — vocals (tracks: 9, 11)
- Christopher "Yung Redd" Gallien — vocals (track 9)
- Frasier "Trae tha Truth" Thompson — vocals (track 10)
- Marcus "Lil' Keke" Edwards — vocals (track 10)
- Aaron D. "Tech N9NE" Yates — vocals (track 12)
- Samuel "Krizz Kaliko" Watson — vocals (track 12)
- Isaac "Young Chill" Yowman — vocals & producer (track 13), mixing (tracks: 1–11, 13)
- Genevieve Goings — additional background vocals (track 4)
- Nick Baker — additional guitar & additional bass (track 13)
- Travis Barker — producer (tracks: 1, 8)
- Donald Johnson Jr. — producer (tracks: 2, 7, 11)
- Kenneth Roy — producer (tracks: 2, 7, 11)
- Gennessee Lewis — producer (track 4)
- Antwan "Amadeus" Thompson — producer (track 5)
- Nathan "Happy" Perez — producer (track 6)
- Howard "X-Fyle" Metoyer — producer (tracks: 9, 12)
- John "I.N.F.O." Christopher — producer (track 10)
- Scott "N.O.V.A." Novelli — producer (track 10)
- Travis Farris — recording (tracks: 1–11, 13), A&R
- Mickaël Zibi — recording (track 4)
- Robert Rebeck — recording & mixing (track 12)
- Mark Kidney — mastering
- H. "G-Dash" Guidry — executive producer
- Michael "5000" Watts — executive producer
- Mike Frost — art direction, design, photography
- Brandon Holley — photography
- Adrian Williams — A&R

== Charts ==
Chart (2009)	Peak position
US Billboard 200	15
US Top R&B/Hip-Hop Albums (Billboard)	6
US Top Rap Albums (Billboard)	4
