= Life Goes On (Trae album) =

Studio album by Trae
- Released: October 23, 2007
- Recorded: 2006–07
- Studios: Dean's List House of Hits (New York City, NY); Trae's House (Houston, TX)
- Genre: Southern hip hop
- Length: 67:45
- Labels: G-Maab; Rap-A-Lot; Asylum
- Producers: J. Prince (exec.); Trae (also exec.); Scott Novelli; I.N.F.O.; Mr. Lee; Drew; Goichi; M.A.J.; Mike Dean; Nitti; Mr. Rogers; Platinum Hands; Q-Stone; Sean T; Sosa

Trae chronology
| Restless (2006) | Life Goes On (2007) | The Beginning (2008) |

Professional ratings
Review scores
| Source | Rating |
|---|---|
| DJBooth.net | 3.5/5 stars |
| Pitchfork | 7.5/10 stars |
| XXL | 2/5 stars |

Life Goes On is the fourth studio album by American rapper Trae. It was released on October 23, 2007, by G-Maab Entertainment, Rap-A-Lot Records and Asylum Records. The album features guest appearances from Jody Breeze, Jadakiss, Slim Thug, Styles P and Yung Joc among others. The album was supported by lead single: "Screwed Up" featuring Lil Wayne.

The S.L.A.B.-ED version of the album was released on December 8, 2007. DJ Pollie Pop created this version of the album through his account on Myspace. To date, the album has sold 12,500 copies in its first week.

== Track listing ==
| No. | Title | Producer(s) | Length |
|---|---|---|---|
| 1. | "Throw Aways" (featuring Gorilla Zoe and Yung Joc) | M.A.J.; Sosa | 3:11 |
| 2. | "I'm a Gangsta" | Drew | 4:16 |
| 3. | "Interlude 1 of Life Goes On" (featuring Lil Duval) | | 0:58 |
| 4. | "Screwed Up" (featuring Lil Wayne) | Mr. Lee | 5:02 |
| 5. | "Against All Odds" (featuring 2Pac) | Q-Stone | 4:22 |
| 6. | "Interlude 2 of Life Goes On" (featuring Lil Duval) | | 1:12 |
| 7. | "Nuthin' 2 a Boss" (featuring Slim Thug) | I.N.F.O.; Scott Novelli | 3:59 |
| 8. | "Life Goes On" (featuring L. Boogie) | Mike Dean; Goichi | 4:11 |
| 9. | "Smile" (featuring Jadakiss and Styles P) | Sean T | 4:32 |
| 10. | "Interlude 3 of Life Goes On" (featuring Lil Duval) | | 1:12 |
| 11. | "Give My Last Breathe Intro" | Mike Dean | 1:40 |
| 12. | "Give My Last Breathe" | Mr. Lee | 4:23 |
| 13. | "Gittin' High" | Mr. Rogers | 4:06 |
| 14. | "Interlude 4 of Life Goes On" (featuring Lil Duval) | | 1:00 |
| 15. | "Ghetto Queen" (featuring Lloyd and Rich Boy) | I.N.F.O.; Scott Novelli | 5:00 |
| 16. | "Million Bucks" (featuring Jay'Ton and Lil' Boss) | Platinum Hands | 4:43 |
| 17. | "C Me Ride" | Nitti | 4:51 |
| 18. | "I'm Good" (featuring Jody Breeze) | I.N.F.O.; Scott Novelli | 4:21 |
| 19. | "The Truth" | I.N.F.O.; Scott Novelli | 4:07 |
| 20. | "Outro of Life Goes On" (featuring Lil Duval) | | 0:38 |
| Total length: | | | 67:45 |

Sample credits

- "Against All Odds" contains a portion of "Deadly Combination", specifically 2Pac's verse.
- "Nuthin' 2 a Boss" contains samples of "Winter Sadness" performed by Kool and the Gang, and "I'm a D-Boy" performed by Lil Wayne.
- "Smile" contains a sample of "Your Smile" performed by Angela Winbush.
- "Give My Last Breath" contains the chorus of Trae's earlier single, "Swang", in which was part of Big Hawk's rap. The song also is a tribute to the late Big Hawk.
- "Gittin' High" contains samples of "Sensuality I & II" performed by The Isley Brothers, and "Wanna Be a Baller" performed by Fat Pat.
- "Ghetto Queen" contains samples of "Living Inside Your Love" performed by Earl Klugh, and "Pain" performed by 2Pac (This is the same sample that were used from one of Salad Fingers' popular videos).
- "The Truth" contains a sample of "I Want to Thank You" performed by One Way.

== Charts ==
| Chart (2007) | Peak position |
|---|---|
| US Billboard 200 | 104 |
| US Top R&B/Hip-Hop Albums (Billboard) | 17 |
| US Top Rap Albums (Billboard) | 7 |
