= ABN (duo) =

American hip hop duo

- Also known as: Assholes by Nature
- Origin: Houston, Texas, United States
- Genres: Southern hip hop
- Years active: 2003–2008
- Labels: G-Maab; Rap-A-Lot
- Members: Trae tha Truth; Z-Ro; Lil Boss; Jay'ton

ABN or Assholes by Nature is an American hip hop duo, composed of Houston, Texas-based rappers Trae tha Truth and Z-Ro. They have so far released two studio albums Assholes by Nature (2003) and It Is What It Is (2008).

== History ==
The duo is a collaboration between Z-Ro and Trae, both of whom are well established solo recording artists within Texas' underground hip hop scene. Their first collaboration was on Z-Ro's debut album Look What You Did to Me (1998), with them regularly appearing on each other's albums thereafter. Z-Ro and Trae grew apart in subsequent years and parted ways altogether after their last (and so far final) album in 2008 due to personal and creative differences.

In 2022, in a statement to XXL, Z-Ro claimed Trae Tha Truth asked to talk to him outside a Houston Restaurant before he allegedly sucker punched him, following which several men jumped in and continued to assault him. On September 2, 2022, a viral video obtained by TMZ, shows Trae attacking Z-Ro with the rest of his crew, during 50 Cent’s TYCOON weekend. This comes after Trae denied on his Instagram page following the altercation and previous footage that went viral, that Z-Ro was not outnumbered in the fight. In December, Trae was charged with a misdemeanor for assault causing bodily injury. Video surfaced of him turning himself in to authorities; he was reportedly released on bond shortly after.

== Discography ==
ABN's first release was a double CD titled Assholes by Nature. It was released in 2003 by the independent label G-Maab Records and was produced by P.K. Johnson.

In 2008 the duo released It Is What It Is which turned out to be the biggest commercial success for both artists. The album was released on Rap-A-Lot Records and produced by Brandon Crear. The album reached number 62 on the Billboard 200, 10 on the Top R&B/Hip-Hop Albums, and 7 on the Top Rap Albums charts. Previously the artists had 13 appearances on the Top R&B/Hip-Hop Albums chart between them; this was the first in the top 10.

=== Studio albums ===
| Year | Album | Peak chart positions | | |
| Year | Album | U.S. | U.S. R&B | U.S. Rap |
|---|---|---|---|---|
| 2003 | Assholes by Nature: Released: 2003; Label: Guerilla Maab Entertainment | — | — | — |
| 2008 | It Is What It Is: Released: July 15, 2008; Label: Rap-A-Lot Records/Asylum Records/Warner Bros. Records | 62 | 10 | 7 |
