= Heart of a Champion (album) =

Studio album by Paul Wall
- Released: July 13, 2010
- Recorded: 2009–2010
- Genre: Hip-hop
- Length: 56:44
- Label: Swishahouse; Asylum; Warner Bros.
- Producer: Beanz 'N Kornbread; Da Shit Factory; Travis Barker; Young Chill

Paul Wall chronology
Fast Life (2009)	Heart of a Champion (2010)	#Checkseason (2013)

Singles from Heart of a Champion
- 1. "I'm On Patron" Released: March 30, 2010

Heart of a Champion is the fifth solo studio album by American rapper Paul Wall. It was released on July 13, 2010, through Swishahouse with distribution via Asylum Records and Warner Bros. Records.

Production was handled by Travis Barker, Beanz & Kornbread, Da Shit Factory and Young Chill, with G-Dash and Michael "5000" Watts serving as executive producers. Wall had a session with The Neptunes but they did not make the final cut. It features guest appearances from Andre Nickatina, Bun B, Chamillionaire, C.Stone, Dallas Blocker, Devin the Dude, Jay Electronica, Jim Jones, Johnny Dang, Kid Sister, Lil' Keke, Mitchy Slick, Raekwon, Slim Thug, Yelawolf, Yo Gotti and Z-Ro, as well as Paul Wall's short-lived hip-hop supergroup Expensive Taste.

The album was supported by the only single "I'm On Patron" with an accompanying music video.

== Critical reception ==
Professional ratings
Review scores
Source	Rating
AllMusic	4/5 stars
HipHopDX	3/5
Slant	1.5/5 stars
Spin	7/10 marks
XXL	3/5 (L)

AllMusic's David Jeffries praised the album, saying "Barker's productions aren't as showy as you might expect, acting as true support with some interesting ideas, and the rest of the tracks are well handled by the returning Dirty South crew Beanz & Kornbread, giving the album a proper mix of new and old". Ben Detrick of Spin found Paul Wall "cruises along with his usual simile-packed musings about wood-grained cars, fat pockets, and jewelry resembling 'snow cones'", and called him "a veteran rapper without bitterness is a treat". HipHopDX editor Sean Ryon gave the album 3 out of 5, saying: "as flawed as it is, Heart of a Champion is still an album worthy of merit. Paul exhibits a lyrical vigor unheard since his 2005 major label debut. While the album may not be a complete victory, he proves without a doubt that he's still the People's Champ". The album received a 3 out of 5 rating from XXL.

In his negative review for Slant Magazine, Jesse Cataldo found the album "feels like a misguided departure and a lazy retread".

== Commercial performance ==
In the United States, the album debuted at number 58 on the Billboard 200, number 11 on the Top R&B/Hip-Hop Albums and number 7 on the Top Rap Albums charts, selling 7,600 copies in its first week. In its second week, the album fell to number 124 on the Billboard 200 with total sales of 11,000 copies in the United States. As of January 2011, the album has sold 27,000 copies in the United States.

== Track listing ==
No.	Title	Writer(s)	Producer(s)	Length
1.	"Take Notes"	Paul Michael Slayton; Travis Landon Barker	Travis Barker	3:11
2.	"Showin' Skillz" (featuring Lil' Keke)	Slayton; Marcus Edwards; Barker	Travis Barker	4:30
3.	"I'm on Patron"	Slayton; Donald Johnson Jr.; Kenneth Roy	Beanz-N-Kornbread	3:49
4.	"Round Here" (featuring Chamillionaire)	Slayton; Hakeem Seriki; Johnson Jr.; Roy; Mark Felder	Beanz-N-Kornbread	4:05
5.	"Im'ma Get It" (featuring Bun B and Kid Sister)	Slayton; Bernard James Freeman; Melissa Young; Barker	Travis Barker	4:15
6.	"Stay Iced Up" (featuring C. Stone and Johnny Dang)	Slayton; Matthew Christopher Stone; Tuấn Đặng; Blake Dozier; John Hearon; Justin Rogers	Da Shit Factory	4:05
7.	"Pocket Fulla Presidents" (featuring Andre Nickatina and Mitchy Slick)	Slayton; Andre Adams; Charles Mitchell; Johnson Jr.; Roy	Beanz-N-Kornbread	4:04
8.	"Ain't a Thang" (featuring Jim Jones)	Slayton; Joseph Jones; Barker	Travis Barker	3:15
9.	"My City" (featuring Dallas Blocker and Yo Gotti)	Slayton; Nathan Blocker; Mario Mims; Johnson Jr.; Roy	Beanz-N-Kornbread	4:08
10.	"Smoke Everyday" (featuring Devin the Dude and Z-Ro)	Slayton; Devin Copeland; Joseph McVey; Johnson Jr.; Roy	Beanz-N-Kornbread	6:38
11.	"Live It" (featuring Raekwon, Yelawolf and Jay Electronica)	Slayton; Corey Woods; Timothy Elpadaro; Barker	Travis Barker	4:04
12.	"Not My Friend" (Expensive Taste featuring Slim Thug)	Slayton; Rob Aston; Stayve Thomas; Barker	Travis Barker	3:16
13.	"Still On"	Slayton; Isaac Yowman	Yung Chill	4:01
14.	"Heart of a Hustler" (performed by Expensive Taste)	Slayton; Aston; Barker	Travis Barker	3:24
Total length:				56:44

iTunes bonus tracks
No.	Title	Writer(s)	Producer(s)	Length
15.	"Keep on Pushin'" (featuring Unique)	Slayton; Dominic Harris; Johnson Jr.; Roy	Beanz-N-Kornbread	3:57
16.	"Posted Up" (featuring Tum Tum and Big Tuck)	Slayton; Tony Richardson; Johnson Jr.; Roy	Beanz-N-Kornbread	5:18

== Personnel ==
- Paul Michael "Paul Wall" Slayton — vocals
- Marcus "Lil' Keke" Edwards — vocals (track 2)
- Hakeem "Chamillionaire" Seriki — vocals (track 4)
- Bernard "Bun B" Freeman — vocals (track 5)
- Melissa "Kid Sister" Young — vocals (track 5)
- Matthew Christopher Stone — vocals (track 6)
- Tuấn "TV Johnny" Đặng — vocals (track 6)
- Andre "Dre Dog" Adams — vocals (track 7)
- Charles "Mitchy Slick" Mitchell — vocals (track 7)
- Joseph "Jim Jones" Jones II — vocals (track 8)
- Nathan "Dallas" Blocker — vocals (track 9)
- Mario "Yo Gotti" Mims — vocals (track 9)
- Devin "The Dude" Copeland — vocals (track 10)
- Joseph "Z-Ro" McVey — vocals (track 10)
- Corey "Raekwon" Woods — vocals (track 11)
- Michael "Yelawolf" Atha — vocals (track 11)
- Timothy "Jay Electronica" Elpadaro — vocals (track 11)
- Robert "Skinhead Rob" Aston — vocals (tracks: 12, 14)
- Stayve "Slim Thug" Thomas — vocals (track 12)
- Bizzle — additional vocals (track 4)
- Donald Johnson Jr. — additional vocals (track 10), producer (tracks: 3, 4, 7, 9, 10), recording, mixing
- Kenneth Roy — additional vocals (track 10), producer (tracks: 3, 4, 7, 9, 10), recording, mixing
- DJ Michael "5000" Watts — scratches (track 2), executive producer
- DJ Spider — scratches (track 5)
- Travis Barker — producer (tracks: 1, 2, 5, 8, 11, 12, 14)
- Da Shit Factory — producers (track 6)
- Isaac "Young Chill" Yowman — producer (track 13)
- Travis Farris — recording, management
- Michael Kolar — recording
- Graham Burris — recording
- Greg Magers — recording
- Mickaël Zibi — recording, mixing
- Krushadelic — recording
- Todd Cooper — recording
- Leo Goff — recording
- Barre Kelly — recording
- Shaun Bless — recording
- Marcus Beatty — recording
- Mike Miller — recording
- Nacio — recording
- James Ingram — mixing, engineering
- Robb McDavid — mixing
- Kevin Bivona — engineering
- Mark Kidney — mastering
- H. "G-Dash" Guidry — executive producer
- Mike Frost — art direction, design, photography
- Brandon Holley — photography

== Charts ==
Chart (2010)	Peak position
US Billboard 200	58
US Top R&B/Hip-Hop Albums (Billboard)	11
US Top Rap Albums (Billboard)	7
