= Street King (album) =

Studio album by Trae tha Truth
- Released: July 12, 2011
- Recorded: 2008–2011
- Genre: Southern hip hop
- Length: 1:19:18
- Label: ABN; Fontana
- Producer: Trae (exec.); Prez (exec.); Boss Kon; CyFyre; Drumma Boy; Mr. Inkredible; Mr. Lee; Mr. Rogers; Platinum Hands; Rockaway Productions; StreetRunner; Track Bangas; V-Don; Wyclef Jean

Trae tha Truth chronology
The Beginning (2008)	Street King (2011)	Tha Truth (2015)

Street King is the sixth studio album by American rapper Trae tha Truth. It was released on July 12, 2011, by ABN Entertainment and Fontana Distribution. The album follows his 2008 release of The Beginning. Trae speaks in the album for Hip Hop at Lunch saying: "This album became an instant classic. I was down for what I was going, to be banned from this shit and then I was not even focused on music".

== Singles ==
Trae released two singles, "Getting Paid", which features vocals from rapper Wiz Khalifa, and production by V-Don, was released on June 7, 2011, to help in the promotion of Street King. The second single of Street King is "I'm On" that features vocal-contributions from rappers Lupe Fiasco, Wale, Wiz Khalifa, Big Boi and MDMA and production by CyFyre. In February 2012 Trae released "I'm on 2.0" that features vocal-contributions from rappers Big K.R.I.T., Jadakiss, J. Cole, Kendrick Lamar, B.o.B, Tyga, Gudda Gudda, Bun B and Mark Morrison. The album has sold over 20,000 copies on its own.

== Track listing ==
Track list confirmed by HipHopDX, and production by Screw Heads Only.

No.	Title	Producer(s)	Length
1.	"Strapped Up" (featuring Pyrexx)	Drumma Boy	4:40
2.	"Woke Up This Morning" (featuring Jayton & Rod-C)	Boss DeVito	5:25
3.	"Inkredible (Remix)" (featuring Rick Ross & Jadakiss)	Mr. Inkredible	3:35
4.	"Getting Paid" (featuring Wiz Khalifa)	V-Don; Jordan J. Sirhan (co.)	4:26
5.	"I Am the Streets" (featuring Rick Ross, Lloyd & The Game)	CyFyre	4:30
6.	"Keep on Rollin'" (featuring Gorilla Zoe)	Track Bangas; Mr. Inkredible	4:38
7.	"That's Not Luv" (featuring Lil' Wayne)	StreetRunner	3:05
8.	"Life" (featuring Jadakiss)	V-Don	3:17
9.	"Goes Out" (featuring Brian Angel, Scarface & J-Dawg)	Mr. Rogers	4:58
10.	"Slum Religion" (featuring Wyclef Jean)	Wyclef Jean; Jason & Goldie (co.)	4:14
11.	"Not My Time" (featuring Lynzie Kent)	Brad of Revelation Sounds	5:20
12.	"Hood Shit" (featuring Shawty Lo & Yung Quis)	Mr. Lee	4:17
13.	"I'm Fly" (featuring Yo Gotti)	Mr. Rogers	4:21
14.	"Street King"	Track Bangas	5:22
15.	"It’s All I Know" (featuring Messy Marv)	Boss DeVito	3:43
16.	"I'm Gone Bus"	StreetRunner	4:58
17.	"Just Don’t Get It" (featuring MDMA)	Rockaway Productions; Platinum Hands	4:31
18.	"I'm On" (featuring Lupe Fiasco, Wale, Big Boi, Wiz Khalifa & MDMA)	CyFyre	3:58
Total length:			1:19:18

== Charts ==
Chart (2011)	Peak position
US Top R&B/Hip-Hop Albums (Billboard)	38
US Top Rap Albums (Billboard)	23
US Independent Albums (Billboard)	43
