= Checkseason =

#Checkseason

Studio album by Paul Wall
- Released: December 10, 2013
- Recorded: 2013
- Genre: Hip hop
- Length: 34:48
- Label: Paul Wall; EMPIRE
- Producer: G.Luck and BDon; Beanz N Kornbread; June James; DJ Mustard

Paul Wall chronology
Heart of a Champion (2010)	#Checkseason (2013)	The Po Up Poet (2014)

#Checkseason is the sixth studio album by American rapper Paul Wall released by his own label Paul Wall Music on December 10, 2013.

== Background ==
After Wall's major label contract ended he was left without a label and not knowing how to release new music. Wall also had health problems due to his morbid obesity, weighing over 320 pounds (150 kg). After trying to lose weight in a number of ways, Wall eventually undertook a surgery, commenting that it "took [him] to a whole 'nother place and it really saved [his] life." After that he decided to start over his career and with the help of his friend Slim Thug created his own independent label Paul Wall Music. Wall declined several offers from other labels, in order to develop his music style and fan base. He commented: "I'm just independent; I'm just putting it out underground. Back to where it all started, back to the basics. I'm really following my brother Slim Thug's lead, what he doing now, putting his mixtape out. Taking it back to the underground."

== Guests, production and release ==
Most of #Checkseason's tracks were produced by G.Luck and BDon; other producers included Beanz N Kornbread, June James and DJ Mustard. The album had guest appearances from frequent collaborators Lil' Keke and Slim Thug, as well as rappers Kid Ink, YG and Young Dolph, among others. Paul Wall hosted a release party at Houston club Empire a day prior to the album's official release.

Wall called #Checkseason a "theme project", which he made for himself and people with his lifestyle, stating that "there are no songs for girls on there, no songs for the radio, no songs for the strip club; it's just like the blueprint to make a rap record."

== Track listing ==
No.	Title	Producer(s)	Length
1.	"Gwopanese" (featuring Young Dolph)	G.Luck and BDon	3:25
2.	"F.A.F."	G.Luck and BDon	2:57
3.	"My Lac on Vogues"	Beanz-n-Kornbread	2:57
4.	"Po Up"	G.Luck and BDon	4:06
5.	"Check Out My Feet" (featuring Lil' Keke)	G.Luck and BDon	3:11
6.	"That Check" (featuring Stunna Bam)	June James	3:30
7.	"Countin Franklins"	G.Luck and BDon	2:54
8.	"Too Busy Gettin Paid" (featuring Slim Thug)	G.Luck and BDon	2:59
9.	"Gettin Tho'd" (featuring Kid Ink & YG)	DJ Mustard	3:01
10.	"Stop Playin Wit Drank" (featuring Killa Kyleon)	G.Luck and BDon	3:31
11.	"Wake Up, Get Money"	G.Luck and BDon	3:01
Total length:			34:48
