= Restless (Trae album) =

Studio album by Trae
- Released: June 27, 2006
- Recorded: 2005–2006
- Studios: Dean's List House of Hits (New York City, NY); Trae's House (Houston, TX)
- Genre: Southern hip hop
- Length: 75:18
- Labels: G-Maab; Rap-A-Lot; Asylum
- Producers: J. Prince (exec.); Trae (also exec.); Q-Stone; Scott Novelli; Johnnie Jones; Bigg Tyme; Mike Dean; Mr. Lee; Mr. Rogers; Yung Chill; Dom

Trae chronology
Same Thing Different Day (2004)	Restless (2006)	Life Goes On (2007)

Restless is the third studio album and commercial debut by American rapper Trae. It was released on June 27, 2006, by G-Maab Entertainment, Rap-A-Lot Records and Asylum Records.

== Music and lyrics ==
The album's ninth track, "The Truth", features a added guest verse from a fellow American rapper 2Pac, and 2Pac's verse on "The Truth" occurs to be the same verse that 2Pac originally recorded for the song, "Dumpin'", from which was taken from 2Pac's posthumously-released studio album, Pac's Life (2006).

== Reception ==
Professional ratings
Review scores
Source	Rating
RapReviews	8/10 stars

About.com named Restless as one of the top 100 rap albums of the 2000s.

== Track listing ==
No.	Title	Producer(s)	Length
1.	"Intro"		2:13
2.	"Real Talk"	Scott Novelli	3:20
3.	"In the Hood" (featuring Yung Joc and Big Pokey)	Mr. Lee	4:53
4.	"Screw Done Already Warned Me" (featuring Lil' Keke)	Q-Stone	5:06
5.	"So Gangsta" (featuring Bun B)	Q-Stone	4:39
6.	"Restless" (featuring Young Noble)	Scott Novelli	4:29
7.	"The Rain" (featuring Dallas Blocker and Shyna)	Q-Stone	4:57
8.	"Dedicated 2 You"	Q-Stone	5:34
9.	"The Truth" (featuring 2Pac and Billy Cook)	Q-Stone	4:07
10.	"Swang" (featuring Pimp C, Fat Pat, and Big Hawk)	Mike Dean; Mr. Rogers	4:44
11.	"Quit Calling Me"	Q-Stone	3:51
12.	"Cadillac" (featuring Paul Wall, Three 6 Mafia, Jay'Ton, and Lil' Boss)	Johnnie Jones	6:00
13.	"No Help" (featuring Z-Ro)	Q-Stone	5:04
14.	"Song Cry"	Yung Chill	3:02
15.	"Matter of Time" (featuring Mýa)	Dom	4:39
16.	"Coming Around tha Corner" (featuring Jim Jones)	Johnnie Jones; Q-Stone (co.)	3:32
17.	"Who Da Truth Is"	Trae	0:11
18.	"Pop Trunk Wave"	Bigg Tyme	4:03
Total length:			1:15:18

Sample credits

- "Screw Done Already Warned Me" contains a sample of "B****es Ain't S***" performed by DJ Screw
- "Restless" contains a sample of "The Overture of Foxy Brown" performed by Willie Hutch
- "Swang" contains samples of "The Lady in My Life" performed by Michael Jackson, and "25 Lighters" performed by DJ DMD
- "Cadillac" contains a sample of "N Luv wit My Money" performed by Paul Wall and Chamillionaire
- "No Help" contains a sample of "Your Child" performed by Mary J. Blige

== Charts ==
Chart (2006)	Peak position
US Billboard 200	87
US Top R&B/Hip-Hop Albums (Billboard)	16
US Top Rap Albums (Billboard)	9

== Singles ==
Single information
"Swang" (featuring Pimp C, Big Hawk & Fat Pat)
- Released: 2006
- B-Side:
"In the Hood (feat. Yung Joc)"
- Released: 2006
- B-Side:
"No Help" (featuring Z-Ro)
- Released: 2006
- B-Side: "Screw Done Already Warned Me" (featuring Lil Keke)
