= Get Money, Stay True =

Studio album by Paul Wall
- Released: April 3, 2007
- Recorded: 2006–2007
- Genre: Southern hip hop
- Length: 58:31
- Label: Swishablast; Swishahouse; Asylum; Atlantic
- Producer: Drumma Boy; Jermaine Dupri; KLC; Mr. Lee; Russel "Aaddict" Howard; Zach Burke

Paul Wall chronology
The Peoples Champ (2005)	Get Money, Stay True (2007)	Fast Life (2009)

Singles from Get Money, Stay True
- 1. "Break 'Em Off" Released: February 20, 2007; 2. "I'm Throwed" Released: March 27, 2007

Get Money, Stay True is the third solo studio album by American rapper Paul Wall. It was released on April 3, 2007, via Swishablast, Swishahouse, Asylum Records, and Atlantic Records. Production was handled by Mr. Lee, Drumma Boy, Jermaine Dupri, KLC, Russel "Aaddict" Howard and Zach Burke, with LRoc serving as co-producer. It features guest appearances from Crys Wall, Yung Redd, E Class, Freeway, Jermaine Dupri, Jon B., Juelz Santana, Lil' Keke, Snoop Dogg and Trina, as well as Paul Wall's short-lived hip hop supergroup Expensive Taste.

The album debuted at number 8 on the Billboard 200, number 2 on the Top R&B/Hip-Hop Albums and atop the Top Rap Albums in the United States with 92,300 copies sold in its first week. It was supported with two charted singles, "Break 'Em Off" and "I'm Throwed", which peaked on the Billboard Hot 100 at No. 72 and No. 87, respectively. Music videos were directed for both singles.

== Critical reception ==
Professional ratings
Review scores
Source	Rating
AllHipHop	3.5/5 stars
AllMusic	3.5/5 stars
Entertainment Weekly	B
HipHopDX	2.5/5
Now	2/5 Ns
RapReviews	6.5/10
XXL	L (3/5)

Simon Vozick-Levinson of Entertainment Weekly commended the production for making Paul Wall sound credible but criticized his simplistic "elementary rhymes" when put alongside the album's featured artists. AllMusic's David Jeffries praised Wall for sticking with the formula he used for his debut album but felt his material can get stale over a lengthy runtime, concluding with, "Slice this worthy follow-up to The Peoples Champ in half and it's a different story, one that justifies Wall's place in the game". Steve 'Flash' Juon of RapReviews saw improvement in Wall's lyrical content and delivery but felt the production throughout the album weakened his charismatic personality.

== Track listing ==
No.	Title	Writer(s)	Producer(s)	Length
1.	"Get Your Paper Up" (featuring Yung Redd)	Paul Michael Slayton; Christopher Gallien; Leroy Williams; Travis D. Farris; Lewis Kinoshi	Mr. Lee	3:44
2.	"Everybody Know Me" (featuring Snoop Dogg)	P. Slayton; Calvin Broadus; Williams; Gallien; Farris; Kinoshi	Mr. Lee	4:19
3.	"Break 'Em Off" (featuring Lil' Keke)	P. Slayton; Marcus Edwards; Williams; Farris	Mr. Lee	4:51
4.	"I'm Throwed" (featuring Jermaine Dupri)	P. Slayton; Jermaine Dupri Mauldin; James Elbert Phillips; Crystal Latrice Anderson Slayton; Farris; Kinoshi	Jermaine Dupri; LRoc (co.)	3:51
5.	"Call Me What U Want" (featuring Yung Redd and E Class)	P. Slayton; Gallien; Eddie Brown; Williams	Mr. Lee	4:11
6.	"On the Grind" (featuring Freeway and Crys Wall)	P. Slayton; Leslie Pridgen; C. Slayton; Williams; Burt Bacharach; Harold Lane David	Mr. Lee	3:45
7.	"Bangin' Screw"	P. Slayton; Russell William Howard; Zachery James Burke; Kinoshi	Russel "Aaddict" Howard; Zach Burke	3:34
8.	"How Gangstas Roll" (featuring Crys Wall)	P. Slayton; C. Slayton; Williams; Marvin Gaye; James Nyx Jr.	Mr. Lee	3:51
9.	"That Fire" (featuring Trina)	P. Slayton; Williams; Gallien; C. Slayton	Mr. Lee	4:40
10.	"Tonight" (featuring Jon B.)	P. Slayton; Jonathan Buck; Williams; C. Slayton; Edwards; Aaron Robin Hall; James Henry Boxley; Gary J. Rinaldo	Mr. Lee	4:45
11.	"Gimme That"	P. Slayton; Christopher James Gholson; Farris; Kinoshi	Drumma Boy	4:24
12.	"I'm Real, What Are You?" (featuring Juelz Santana)	P. Slayton; LaRon L. James; Craig S. Lawson; Farris; Kinoshi; Richard Jones	KLC	4:33
13.	"I Ain't Hard to Find"	P. Slayton; Williams; Kinoshi	Mr. Lee	4:15
14.	"Slidin' on That Oil" (performed by Expensive Taste)	P. Slayton; Rob Aston; Dominic Harris; Travis Barker	Travis Barker	3:48
Total length:				58:31

Bonus tracks
No.	Title	Writer(s)	Length
15.	"I'm Da Shit"	P. Slayton; Barker
16.	"Get Off My D"	P. Slayton; Williams
17.	"Break Em' Off Remix" (featuring Lil' Keke)	P. Slayton; Edwards; Williams

== Personnel ==
- Paul Michael "Paul Wall" Slayton — vocals
- Christopher "Yung Redd" Gallien — vocals (tracks: 1, 5)
- Calvin "Snoop Dogg" Broadus — vocals (track 2)
- Marcus "Lil' Keke" Edwards — vocals (track 3)
- Jermaine Dupri — vocals & producer (track 4)
- Eddie "E Class" Brown — vocals (track 5)
- Crystal "Crys Wall" Slayton — vocals (tracks: 6, 8)
- Russel "Aaddict" Howard — additional vocals & producer (track 7)
- Katrina "Trina" Taylor — vocals (track 9)
- Jonathan "Jon B." Buck — vocals (track 10)
- LaRon "Juelz Santana" James — vocals (track 12)
- Craig "KLC" Lawson — additional vocals & producer (track 12)
- Robert "Skinhead Rob" Aston — vocals (track 14)
- Dominic "Unique" Harris — additional vocals (track 14)
- Leroy "Mr. Lee" Williams Jr. — producer (tracks: 1–3, 5, 6, 8–10, 13), recording (tracks: 3, 9), mixing (tracks: 1–3, 5, 7–10, 13)
- Zach Burke — producer (track 7)
- Christopher "Drumma Boy" Gholson — producer (track 11)
- Travis Barker — producer & mixing (track 14)
- James "LRoc" Phillips — co-producer (track 4)
- Lee Hines — recording (tracks: 1, 2, 5, 6, 8–10)
- "Pretty" Todd E. Berry — recording (tracks: 1, 2, 5, 11–13)
- Rick McRae — recording (track 7)
- Chris Holmes — recording (track 14)
- Phil Tan — mixing (track 4)
- Leslie Braithwaite — mixing (track 11)
- Josh Houghkirk — engineering (track 4)
- Tad "Rowdy Rik" Mingo — engineering assistant (track 4)
- H. "G-Dash" Guidry — executive producer
- Michael "5000" Watts — executive producer

== Charts ==
=== Weekly charts ===
Chart (2007)	Peak position
US Billboard 200	8
US Top R&B/Hip-Hop Albums (Billboard)	2
US Top Rap Albums (Billboard)	1
US Tastemakers (Billboard)	5

=== Year-end charts ===
Chart (2007)	Position
US Billboard 200	195
US Top R&B/Hip-Hop Albums (Billboard)	64
