= I'm Throwed =

Single by Paul Wall featuring Jermaine Dupri

from the album Get Money, Stay True
- Released: March 27, 2007
- Recorded: 2006
- Genre: Hip-hop
- Length: 3:52
- Label: Swishahouse; Asylum; Atlantic
- Songwriters: Paul Slayton; Jermaine Mauldin
- Producer: Jermaine Dupri

Paul Wall singles chronology
"Break 'Em Off" (2007)	"I'm Throwed" (2007)	"Bizzy Body" (2008)

Jermaine Dupri singles chronology
"Dem Jeans" (2006)	"I'm Throwed" (2007)	"Baby Don't Go" (2007)

"I'm Throwed" is the second single from Paul Wall's album, Get Money, Stay True. The song was released in late March 2007, nearly a week before the release of the album. The song is produced by and features Jermaine Dupri. Dupri uses the sounds from a Theremin as a part of the loop in the song. A music video was shot and released, featuring appearances by TV Johnny and Paul Wall's Son, William "Fat Pat" Slayton. In the issue dated April 28, 2007, the single debuted on the Billboard Hot 100 at number 94, eventually peaking at number 87.

== Remix ==
There is also a remix version of the song that features Bow Wow, Chamillionaire and Lil' Keke, in addition to Dupri.

== Charts ==
Chart (2007)	Peak position
US Billboard Hot 100	87
US Hot R&B/Hip-Hop Songs (Billboard)	47
US Hot Rap Songs (Billboard)	21
