= Break 'Em Off =

Single by Paul Wall featuring Lil' Keke

from the album Get Money, Stay True
- Released: February 20, 2007
- Recorded: 2006
- Genre: Hip hop
- Length: 4:52 (album version); 3:57 (edit)
- Label: Swishahouse; Atlantic
- Songwriters: Paul Slayton; Marcus Edwards; Leroy Williams
- Producer: Mr. Lee

Paul Wall singles chronology
"Drive Slow" (2006)	"Break 'Em Off" (2007)	"I'm Throwed" (2007)

Lil' Keke singles chronology
"Knockin' Doorz Down" (2006)	"Break' Em Off" (2007)

"Break 'Em Off" is a song by American rapper Paul Wall featuring fellow Houston-based rapper Lil' Keke. It was released on February 20, 2007 through Swishahouse/Atlantic Records as the lead single from Paul Wall's third solo studio album Get Money, Stay True. The production was handled by Leroy "Mr. Lee" Williams. The single debuted at number 72 on the US Billboard Hot 100 in early March 2007. The music video featured Jessica a.k.a. Miss Rabbit and Flavor of Love winner Chandra Davis a.k.a. Deelishis.

== Track listing ==
No.	Title	Length
1.	"Break 'Em Off" (Radio Version)	3:57
2.	"Break 'Em Off" (Instrumental)	4:52
3.	"Break 'Em Off" (Explicit Version)	4:53
4.	"Break 'Em Off" (Instrumental)	4:52

== Personnel ==
- Paul Slayton – songwriter, rap vocals
- Marcus Edwards – songwriter, rap vocals
- Leroy Williams – songwriter, producer, recording, mixing

== Charts ==
Chart performance for "Break 'Em Off"
Chart (2007)	Peak position
US Billboard Hot 100	72
US Hot R&B/Hip-Hop Songs (Billboard)	58
US Hot Rap Songs (Billboard)	21
