= Jump Shot Media =

American video game developer

Jump Shot Media, LLC
- Company type: Private Company
- Available in: English
- Founded: 2010
- Headquarters: San Jose, California, US
- Area served: Worldwide
- Creators: Keith Andrews; Jerald Perry; Courtney Smith
- Key people: Keith Andrews (CEO); Jerald Perry (co-founder, chief operating officer, and chief creative officer)
- Industry: Video games, computer software, interactive entertainment, mobile game, mobile application development, digital audio
- Products: "Battle Rap Stars"
- Website: jumpshotmedia.com
- Current status: Active

Jump Shot Media is a social and mobile game developer located in San Jose, California, United States. The company develops and markets Rap and Hip hop focused social-network games and mobile applications.

== History ==
Jump Shot Media was started with an idea by IT professional Jerald Perry—otherwise known as the rapper J Peezy—to promote his work as an artist through mobile media. After discussing his idea with music producer and Silicon Valley entrepreneur Keith Andrews (former co-founder of Procera Networks and CEO of AuraOne Systems), the two tweaked the concept into scalable mobile game platform. They then developed the first blueprint for their flagship game Battle Rap Stars and filed a patent on their audio scoring system in 2009.

Andrews and Perry immediately got to work assembling a small team of developers and brought on the marketing expertise of Courtney Smith, the former CEO of the popular street basketball apparel company Y.P.A.

In 2011, Jump Shot Media partnered up with rappers Paul Wall, Mistah F.A.B., and Hopsin to release a mobile battle rap game, Battle Rap Stars.
