= Trae tha Truth =

American rapper (born 1980)

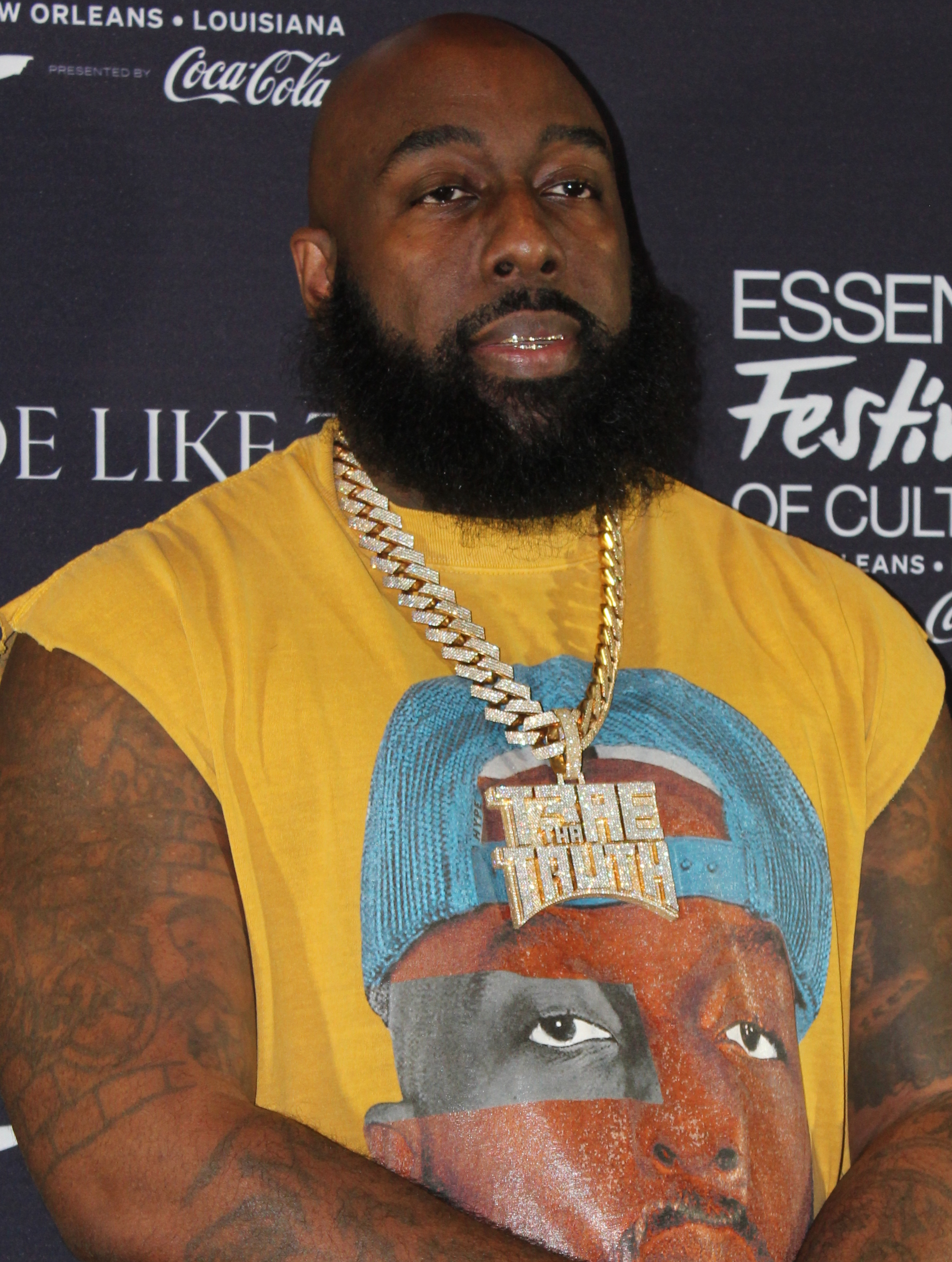
- Trae tha Truth in 2025

Background information
- Also known as: Trae; King Truth
- Born: Frazier Othel Thompson III; July 3, 1980 (age 46); Houston, Texas, U.S.
- Genres: Southern hip-hop
- Occupations: Rapper; songwriter; record executive
- Works: Discography
- Years active: 1998–present
- Labels: G-Maab; ABN; Rap-A-Lot; Asylum; Fontana; Grand Hustle; Empire
- Member of: ABN; Hustle Gang
- Children: 2

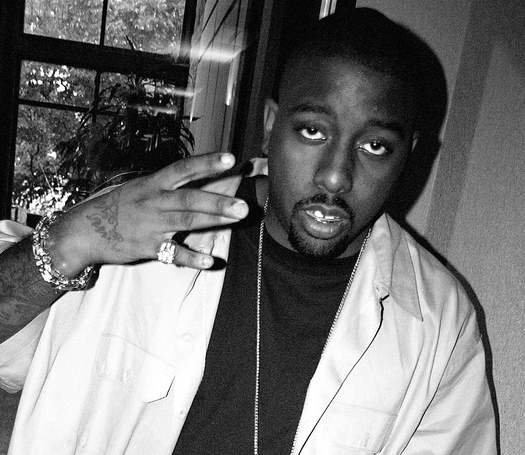
Trae tha Truth in 2005

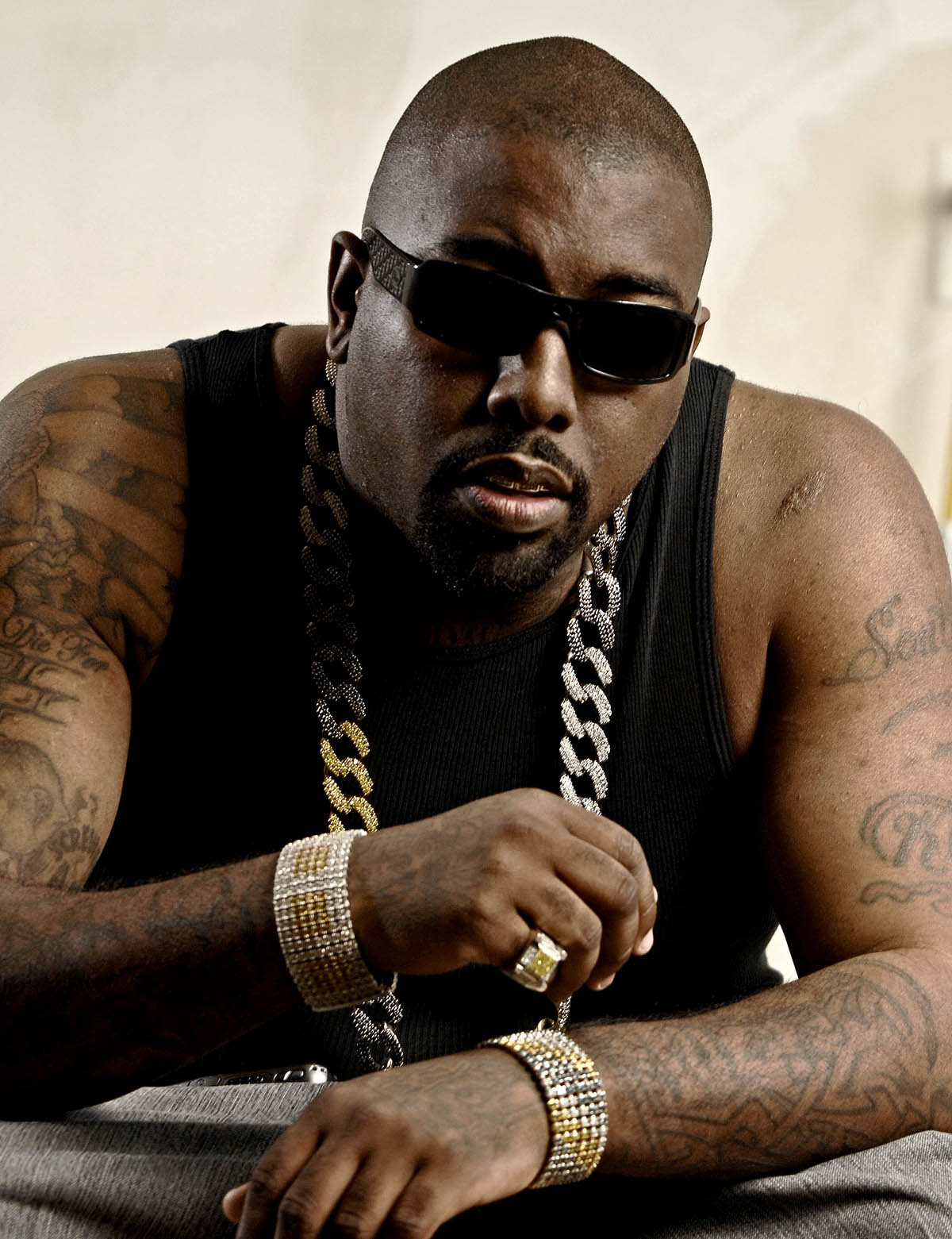
Trae tha Truth in 2008

Frazier Othel Thompson III (born July 3, 1980), known professionally as Trae tha Truth (shortened to Trae), is an American rapper. He first gained recognition with his guest appearance on fellow Houston rapper Z-Ro's album, Look What You Did to Me (1998). After two self-released albums, he further established himself with his third album and major label debut, Restless (2006), which entered the Billboard 200, along with his collaborative album as part of the duo Assholes by Nature (ABN), It Is What It Is (2008).

Thompson has released 11 solo studio albums, as well as 26 mixtapes and two projects as part of ABN, with Z-Ro. He is also known for his "I'm On" series of singles, which have featured several prominent rappers since its first installment in 2011. He signed with fellow Southern rapper T.I.'s Grand Hustle Records in 2012, and was named the label's vice president (VP) in 2017.

== Life and career ==
=== 1990s and 2000s ===
Trae tha Truth gained exposure on the Houston rap scene in 1998, when he made his rapping debut with a guest appearance on Z-Ro's album Look What You Did to Me. In 2003, he began his solo career with the album Losing Composure. 2004's Same Thing Different Day, 2006's Restless, and 2007's Life Goes On followed shortly after. Trae Tha Truth has also worked relentlessly with fellow Houston rapper Chamillionaire on his various Mixtape Messiah series. He also collaborated with Z-Ro to form the duo ABN, or Assholes by Nature. They have released two albums, Assholes by Nature (2003) and It Is What It Is (2008).

In 2008, Trae Tha Truth was awarded by the mayor of Houston, Bill White, and Council Member Peter Brown with his own day, Trae Day, in honor of his outstanding work within the community. This is the first time the honor has been extended to a rap artist. Trae Day is celebrated every year on July 22.

Trae Tha Truth was involved in a fight with Texas rapper Mike Jones at the 2008 Ozone Awards. It was recently suspected that Trae Tha Truth's music was banned from Houston's local radio station, 97.9 The Box.

Trae Tha Truth hosted the second annual Trae Day on July 22, 2009, near Texas Southern University. After the event had ended, eight people, ranging in age from 14 to 21, were shot near a parking garage located on the Texas Southern University campus. One of several people charged with shooting into the crowd was Sauce Walka. When he explained to the morning crew at radio station KBXX "97.9 The Box" that he did not condone the shooting, he was accused by one of the personalities of being responsible for the violence per the lyrical content. When Trae Tha Truth retaliated against her on a mixtape, KBXX banned Trae Tha Truth's music and contributed music from the station and ordered their personalities not to play his music. It caused backlash in the music community, as several DJs at KBXX were terminated from their positions due to playing songs that featured Trae. Due to his inability and hindrance from being able to promote his music in Houston as a result, Trae filed a lawsuit against KBXX early in 2010, citing damages to his career.

=== 2010s ===
After creating a buzz for himself, T.I. announced that he had signed Trae Tha Truth to Grand Hustle Records on March 1, 2012. On October 9, 2012, Trae was featured on the annual BET Hip Hop Awards cypher, alongside his Grand Hustle label-mates Iggy Azalea, B.o.B, Chip, and T.I. His first Grand Hustle album, then-titled Banned, was scheduled to be released in 2014. However, prior to that, he was involved in the recording process for the Grand Hustle Records compilation album. His Grand Hustle Records debut titled Tha Truth was released on July 24, 2015.

On June 20, 2012, at about 3am, Trae tha Truth was shot in the shoulder following a performance at an afterhours club located at 9850 Westpark Drive in Houston. His friend, Carlos Durell "Dinky D" Dorsey, died at the scene along with 30-year-old Erica Rochelle Dotson and the intended target, Coy "Poppa C" Thompson (not related to Trae). A man named Willie Wilkins was also wounded. There were around 20 gunshots fired. In a December 2012 interview with MTV, Trae said that he had been left lying and bleeding at the hospital for hours after being brought in. He went on to say that he "didn't get no bandage, I ain't get no stitches, they didn't take the bullet out, none of that."

On July 4, 2012, it was reported that a suspect, 24-year-old Feanyichi Ezekwesi Uvukansi, had been arrested and charged with capital murder for the shooting. He was later convicted of capital murder and sentenced to life without parole.

On November 25, 2013, Trae released a mixtape titled I Am King as a tribute to Dominic "Money Clip D" Brown.

On January 18, 2017, Trae uploaded a video to Instagram showing himself pushing the bullet out of his shoulder.

During Hurricane Harvey in September 2017, Trae worked as part of his non-profit, the Relief Gang, spending a full day assisting area residents caught in heavy flooding.

In October 2017, Trae hosted a fundraiser for a Houston-area grandma attacked and carjacked at a gas station. On May 23, 2021, Trae received the Change Maker Award at that year's Billboard Music Awards. The award, according to Billboard, pays tribute to "the artist or group that speaks truth to power through their music, celebrity, and community. They are socially conscious, politically aware, active in their community and charitable with time, money and/or influence to improve the lives of others."

=== 2020s ===
On July 15, 2020, Trae was among 87 people arrested in a Breonna Taylor protest in Louisville, Kentucky.

In late 2020, during the COVID-19 pandemic, Trae and his non-profit organization Relief Gang handed out clothing, including jackets and face masks, for the homeless.

On September 2, 2022, a viral video obtained by TMZ, shows Trae attacking Z-Ro with the rest of his crew, during 50 Cent's TYCOON weekend.

Thompson's daughter, named Truth, was missing for several months after being abducted by her mother, Heather Cuevas, during a visitation in August 2024. After a concerted search effort involving multiple law enforcement agencies and a private investigator, Truth was found safe near the Mexican border in El Centro, California, on New Year's Day. Her mother, Cuevas, was arrested on child endangerment charges related to the missing minor. Thompson was reunited with his daughter shortly after.

== Discography ==
Studio albums

- Losing Composure (2003)
- Same Thing Different Day (2004)
- Restless (2006)
- Life Goes On (2007)
- The Beginning (2008)
- Street King (2011)
- Tha Truth (2015)
- Tha Truth, Pt. 2 (2016)
- The Truth, Pt. 3 (2017)
- Hometown Hero (2018)
- Exhale (2019)
- Truth Season: The United Streets of America (2022)
- Stuck in Motion (2023)
- Crowd Control (2024)
- Angel (2025)
