= Paul Wall =

American rapper (born 1981)

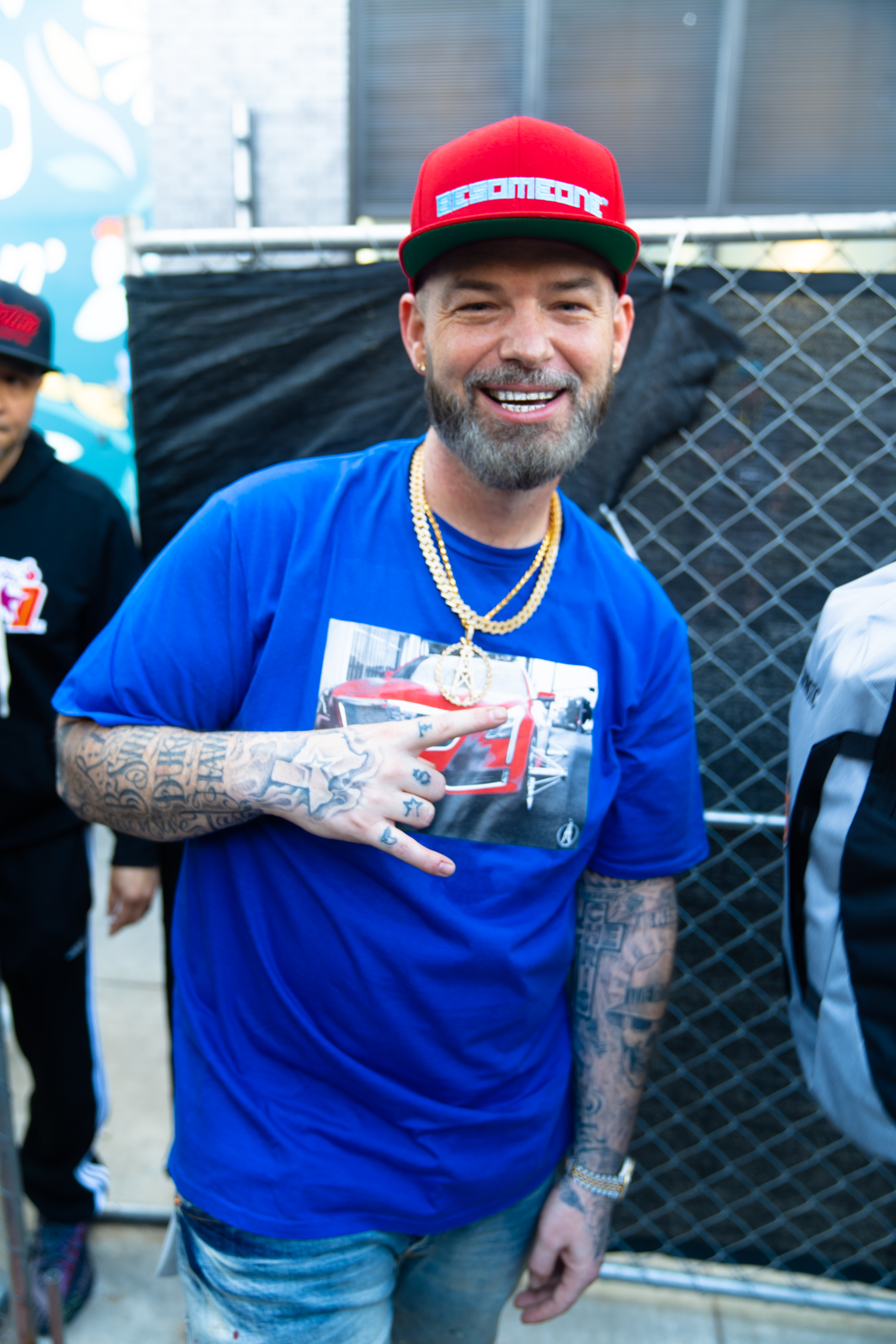
- Paul Wall in 2022

Background information
- Born: Paul Michael Slayton; March 11, 1981 (age 45); Georgetown, Texas, U.S.
- Origin: Houston, Texas, U.S.
- Genre: Southern hip-hop
- Occupations: Rapper; songwriter; disc jockey
- Years active: 1998–present
- Labels: Atlantic (former); Asylum (former); Swishahouse
- Formerly of: The Color Changin' Click; Expensive Taste
- Children: 2
- Website: www.paulwallworld.com

Paul Michael Slayton (born March 11, 1981), better known by his stage name Paul Wall, is an American rapper and DJ. He was an early signee of the Houston-based record label Swishahouse in the late 1990s, through which he met labelmate Chamillionaire and released several albums, including the collaborative Get Ya Mind Correct (2002). By 2005, he signed with Atlantic Records to release his second album and major label debut, The Peoples Champ (2005), which debuted atop the Billboard 200. His third album, Get Money, Stay True (2007), peaked within the chart's top ten. His guest appearance on Nelly's 2005 single "Grillz" yielded his greatest commercial success, peaking at number one on the Billboard Hot 100. The song was also nominated for Best Rap Performance as a Duo or Group at the 2007 Grammy Awards.

== Career ==
=== Swishahouse (1998–2005) ===
Wall attended Jersey Village High School and studied mass communications at the University of Houston for three years. Wall's first music exposure came as a street team member on the Northwest side of Houston, promoting southern labels like Cash Money and No Limit Records.

After proposing to do promotions for Michael "5000" Watts' company Swishahouse, Chamillionaire and Paul Wall came to 97.9 The Box (KBXX), Watts' radio station. Paul and Chamillionaire convinced Watts to let them rap on his radio show and put the verses on one of his mixtapes. That mixtape was titled Choppin Em Up Part 2, which was released in mid-1999. The freestyle became so popular locally that Chamillionaire and Paul Wall became regular staples on Houston's mixtape circuit, appeared on several of Watts' mixtapes and became permanent members of Swishahouse.

After fellow member Slim Thug left the label, Chamillionaire and Paul Wall followed suit and the two started their own group known as The Color Changin' Click (named after Chamillionaire's chameleon persona). Each successive mixtape released by The Color Changin' Click led to more business opportunities; the most notable of which was a contract to do a full album for Paid in Full Records. A one-album contract was negotiated between the Color Changin' Click and Paid in Full's label head, DJ Madd Hatta from 97.9 The Box, and the CCC's first album, Get Ya Mind Correct, would go on to sell over 200,000 copies.

On November 19, 2004, Wall and his entourage allegedly attacked Chamillionaire's younger brother, Rasaq Seriki, at a nightclub. Chamillionaire expressed his disappointment in Paul Wall, arguing that they all used to be family and that these events should not have happened. Before the entire incident between Paul Wall and Rasaq they were all part of the group called "The Color Changin' Click" which now has become fragmented. Chamillionaire released a diss track with Rasaq titled "Go Head". The dispute with Chamillionaire ended by 2010, when the pair reunited for a full tour.

Wall is also a mixtape artist and party DJ, known for producing mixtapes in the now well-known chopped and screwed style, which was invented by DJ Screw.

In 2004, Wall returned to Swishahouse and appeared on Mike Jones' first commercially distributed single, "Still Tippin'".

=== Solo success (2005–2007) ===
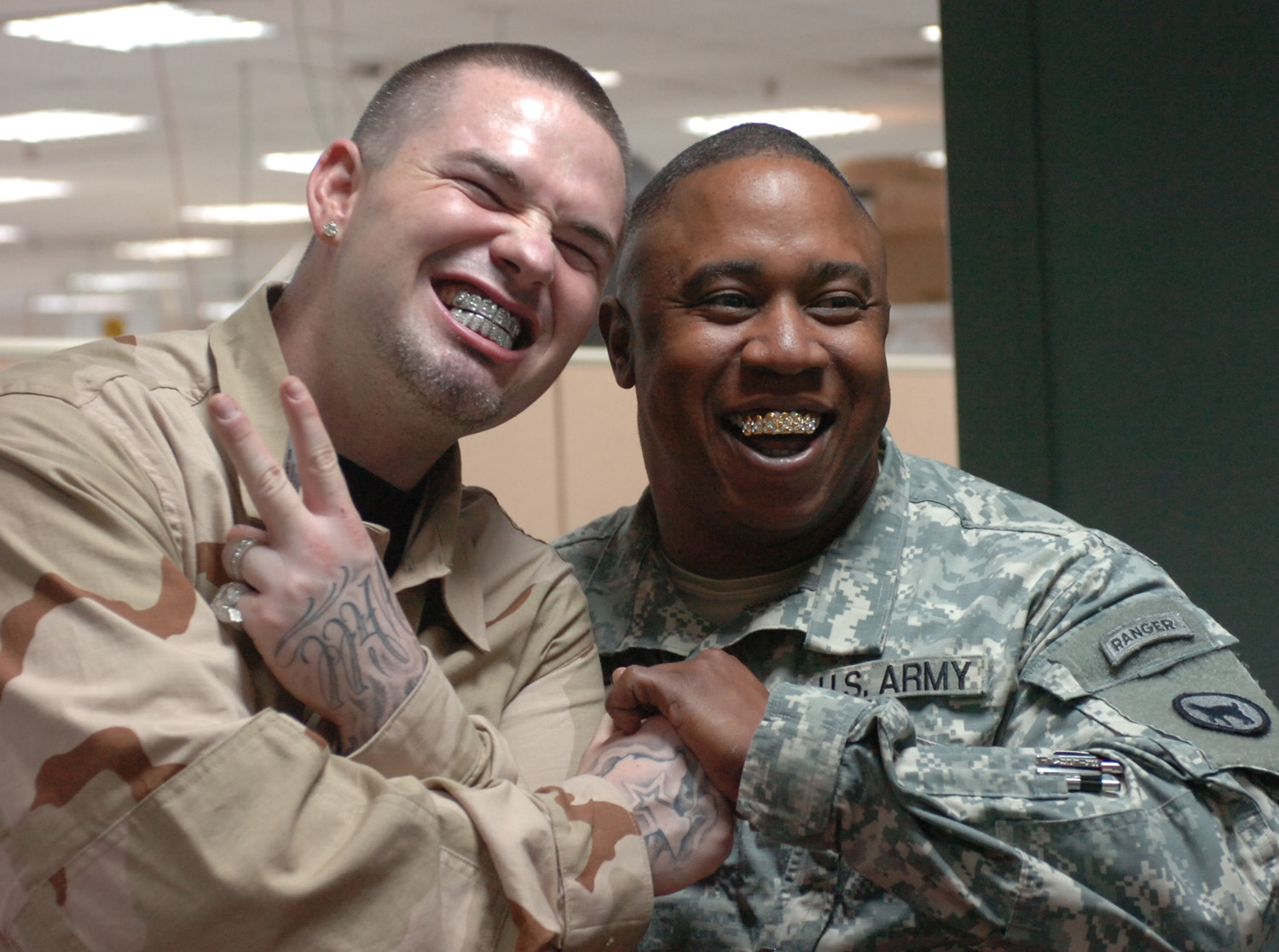
Paul Wall shows off his grills with a smiling soldier in Baghdad, 2007

In 2005, Paul Wall released his first album, The Peoples Champ, which debuted at number one on the Billboard 200. The first single was "Sittin' Sidewayz" featuring Big Pokey, which peaked at no. 34 on the Billboard R&B/Hip-Hop Chart and no. 93 on the Billboard Hot 100. The second single, "They Don't Know", featured Bun B of UGK, and the video version also featured Mike Jones. The third single, "Girl", became the most successful single off The Peoples Champ, peaking at no. 35 on the Hot 100.

In November 2005, Paul Wall was featured on Nelly's Grillz, which reached number one on the Billboard Hot 100.

In 2007, Wall released his second album Get Money, Stay True, which debuted in the number one spot on the Billboard Top R&B/Hip-Hop Albums. The album spawned the singles "Break 'Em Off" featuring Lil Keke, and "I'm Throwed" featuring and produced by Jermaine Dupri. "Break 'Em Off" peaked at no. 72 on the Hot 100 and no. 58 on the R&B charts, and "I'm Throwed" peaked at no. 87 on the Hot 100 and no. 47 on R&B.

Paul Wall was a member of the rap group Expensive Taste, with his friends Travis Barker and Skinhead Rob (Transplants).

In 2007, Paul Wall appeared alongside other celebrities in the music video for "Rockstar" by Nickelback. He appeared on reggae artist Collie Buddz's self-titled debut album.

=== Other projects and newer releases (Since 2008) ===
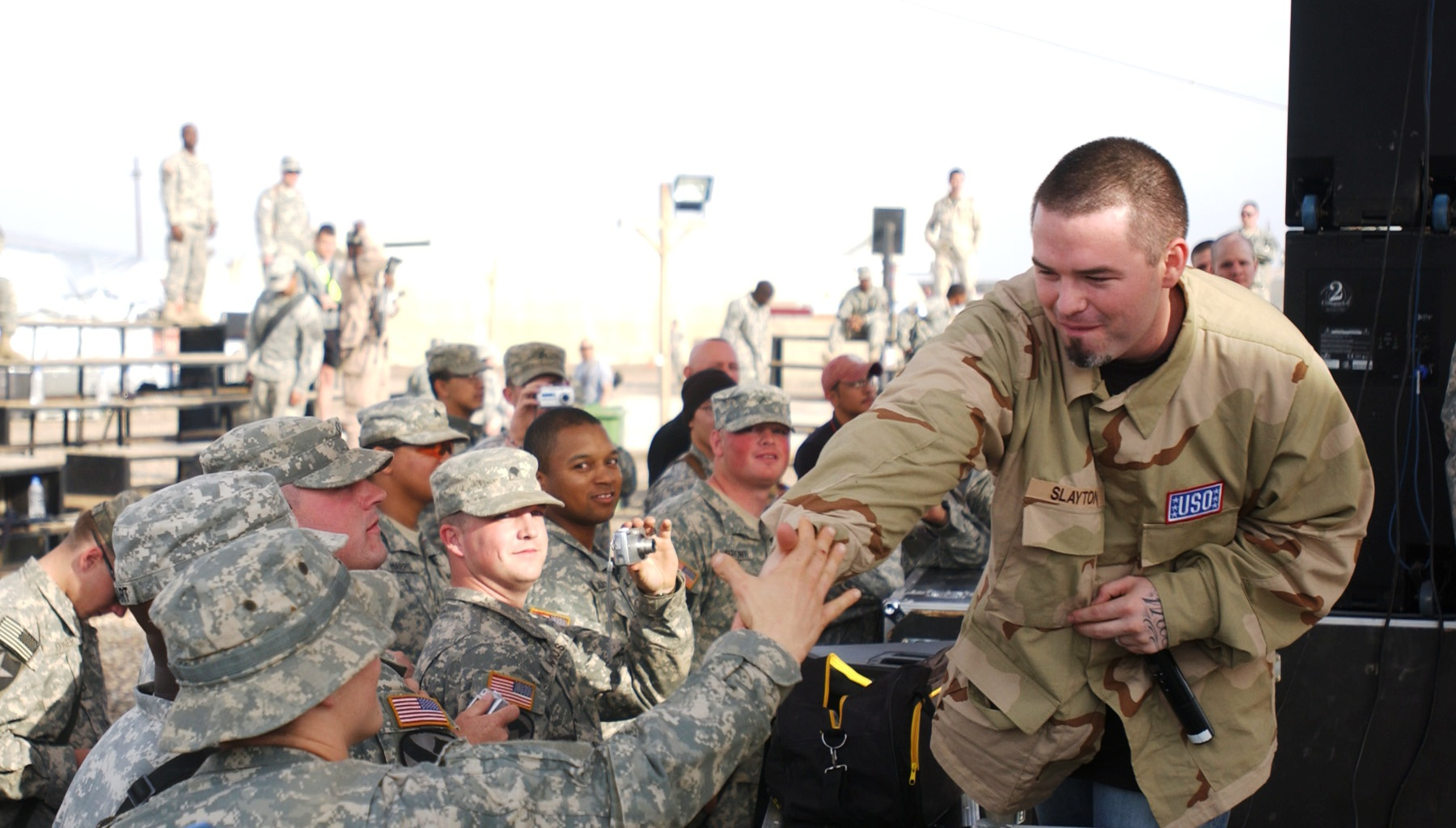
Paul Wall performing in Baghdad, 2007

In the spring of 2008, Paul Wall joined Strange Music recording artist Tech N9ne on a nationwide tour, which featured rapper Ill Bill.

Paul Wall appears as fictional rapper Grillionaire in the movie I Hope They Serve Beer In Hell, released on September 25, 2009. He, along with screenwriters Nils Parker and Tucker Max, co-wrote tracks for the movie.

In 2010, Paul Wall featured on the album Przyjaźń, Duma, Godność, (English: Friendship, Pride, Dignity) by Polish rap artist Kaczor. He also collaborated with Limp Bizkit on the song "Middle Finger", which appeared on the band's 2011 album Gold Cobra.

In October 2011, Paul Wall collaborated with Silicon Valley–based social and mobile game company Jump Shot Media to create the world's first mobile battle rap game, Battle Rap Stars. Paul is featured as the "main event" and is the rapper to beat in order to win the game. On March 7, 2012, Paul Wall released a mixtape entitled No Sleep Til Houston. Paul Wall released a collaboration mixtape with Slim Thug for the 2013 NBA All-Star Game in Houston.

On December 10, 2013, Paul Wall released his seventh studio album, an 11-track offering, titled CheckSeason, which featured contributions from Stunna Bam, Killa Kyleon, Slim Thug, Lil Keke, Kid Ink and Young Dolph. The record was released independently via his Paul Wall Music imprint.

Paul Wall followed up Check Season on December 2, 2014, with the release of his eighth studio album, titled The Po-Up Poet which was produced by June "The Jenius" James. According to a Vibe magazine article in November 2014, "The almost circus-like production reestablishes the idea that as long as Wall's been in the game, he's been a beloved Texas rap legend".

On September 25, 2015, Paul Wall followed up The Po-Up Poet with his ninth studio album, titled SlabGod which contains the single "Swangin' In The Rain". On March 11, 2016, Wall released a remix of "Swangin' In The Rain" which features Slim Thug, Lil' Keke, J-Dawg, Z-Ro, and Chamillionaire. On October 21, 2016, he followed up SlabGod with his ninth album, titled Houston Oiler, released in October 2016. In February 2017, he released the mixtape Diamond Boyz with rapper C Stone. His tenth album Bounce Back Over Setbacks was released on January 19, 2018. His eleventh album, Mind Over Matter followed in March 2020. On June 5, 2020, Wall released a mixtape with Lil Keke, titled Slab Talk.

== Acting career ==
During his break from rapping, Paul Wall appeared in Furnace with Ja Rule. He appeared in the 2009 film I Hope They Serve Beer in Hell along with Jesse Bradford and Matt Czuchry. He was in the 2010 science fiction film Xtinction: Predator X. In 2014 he starred in Isaac Yowman's independently released theatrical film "The Holy Spoof" which sold out in all of its theater showings before its digital stream release online.

== Musical style and image ==
AllMusic critic Andy Kellman described Wall's rapping style as having a "thick but swift Southern drawl" whose lyrics had "countless local slang terms (slabs, swangas, candy paint, tippin') that necessitate a glossary for many listeners."

== Personal life ==
Slayton married his wife, Crystal, in 2005 and has two children. In 2010, he went on an extreme diet and had gastric sleeve surgery, resulting in an over 100 lb. weight loss.

During the 2008 United States presidential election, Slayton supported Democratic candidate Barack Obama. He is a devoted fan of the Houston Texans, Houston Rockets, and the Houston Astros.

Slayton's mother died on October 10, 2026. He learned of her death shortly before a performance at the State Fair of Texas.

== Discography ==
Main studio albums

- Chick Magnet (2004)
- The Peoples Champ (2005)
- Get Money, Stay True (2007)
- Fast Life (2009)
- Heart of a Champion (2010)

Independent studio albums

- #Checkseason (2013)
- The Po-Up Poet (2014)
- Slab God (2015)
- The Houston Oiler (2016)
- Bounce Backs Over Setbacks (2018)
- Mind Over Matter (2020)
- Subculture (2020)
- Hall Of Fame Hustler (2021)
- The Great Wall (2023)
- Once Upon A Grind (2024)
- Fortune & Glory (2026)

Collaborative albums

- Get Ya Mind Correct (with Chamillionaire) (2002)
- Controversy Sells (with Chamillionaire) (2005)
- The Legalizers: Legalize Or Die, Vol. 1 (with Baby Bash) (2016)
- Diamond Boyz (with C Stone) (2017)
- The Legalizers, Vol. 2: Indoor Grow (with Baby Bash) (2018)
- Give Thanks (with Statik Selektah) (2019)
- Slab Talk (with Lil' Keke) (2020)
- Start 2 Finish (with Termanology) (2022)
- The Legalizers 3: Plant Based (with Baby Bash) (2022)
- Start Finish Repeat (with Termanology) (2023)
- The Tonite Show (with DJ.Fresh) (2025)
- The Tonite Show (Chopped Not Slopped Remix) (with DJ.Fresh & OG Ron C) (2025)
- Repeat Repeat Repeat (with Termanology) (2026)

== Filmography ==
Film
Year	Title	Role
2006	Furnace	Joey Robbins
2009	I Hope They Serve Beer in Hell	Grillionaire
2010	Ghetto Stories	Prison Inmate
2010	Alligator X	"Froggy"
2011	Cash or Crash	
2014	The Holy Spot	
2017	2 Aces and a Dirty Heart	
2022	The Pull Up Tour	"Mo"

=== Video games ===
- 2005: Midnight Club 3: DUB Edition for Xbox and PlayStation 2 – "Sittin' Sidewayz"
- 2005: SSX on Tour for Xbox, GameCube, and PlayStation 2 – "Sittin' Sidewayz"
- 2005: Madden NFL 06 for Xbox 360 – "They Don't Know" featuring Mike Jones
- 2007: Def Jam Icon for Xbox 360 and PlayStation 3 – '"Sittin' Sidewayz" and "Trill"
- 2011: Battle Rap Stars for iPhone and Android

== Awards and nominations ==
Ozone Awards

Year	Nominee / work	Award	Result
2006	Paul Wall	Taste Maker (Style and Trendsetter)	Won
2006	"I'm N Luv (Wit a Stripper)" (Remix)	Best Rap/R&B Collaboration	Won
2006	"Holla at Me"	Best Rap Collaboration	Won

Grammy Awards

Year	Nominee / work	Award	Result
2007	"Grillz"	Best Rap Performance as a Duo or Group	Nominated
