= Mike Jones discography =

- Studio albums: 2
- Singles: 11
- Mixtapes: 7
- Featured singles: 9
- Collaboration albums: 2

This is the discography of American rapper Mike Jones.

== Albums ==
=== Studio albums ===
List of albums, with selected chart positions and certifications
Title	Album details	Peak chart positions			Certifications
Title	Album details	US	US R&B	US Rap	Certifications
Who Is Mike Jones?	Released: April 19, 2005; Label: Swishahouse, Asylum, Warner Bros.; Format: CD, digital download	3	1	1	RIAA: Platinum
The Voice	Released: April 28, 2009; Label: Ice Age, Swishahouse, Asylum, Warner Bros.; Format: CD, digital download	12	2	2	
"—" denotes a recording that did not chart or was not released in that territory.

=== Collaborative albums ===
List of albums
Title	Album details
Country Thuggin (with Souf Folk)	Released: March 5, 2002; Label: Southern Vibe; Formats: CD, digital download
1st Round Draft Pick (with Magno)	Released: February 25, 2003; Label: Swishahouse, Deep Distribution Inc.; Formats: CD, digital download
"—" denotes a recording that did not chart or was not released in that territory.

== Extended plays ==
List of EPs, with selected chart positions
Title	EP details	Peak chart positions		
Title	EP details	US	US R&B	US Rap
The American Dream	Released: November 20, 2007; Label: Swishahouse, Asylum, Warner Bros.; Format: CD, digital download	183	28	10

== Mixtapes ==
List of mixtapes
Title	Mixtape details
Ballin' Underground	Released: November 15, 2003; Label: Swishahouse; Formats: CD, digital download
Runnin' Tha Game	Released: 2004; Label: Swishahouse; Formats: CD, digital download, DVD
King of the Streets	Released: February 26, 2006; Label: Swishahouse; Formats: CD, digital download, DVD
Running 4 President 2k8 (Hosted by OG Ron C)	Released: December 18, 2007; Label: Ice Age; Formats: CD, digital download
Self Made	Released: March 18, 2008; Label: Ice Age, BCD Music Group; Formats: Digital download
Back Ballin' Underground (Hosted by DJ Black, DJ 24 & DJ Choice)	Released: October 31, 2013; Label: Ice Age; Formats: Digital download
Money Train (Hosted by DJ Ben Frank & DJ Junior)	Released: January 1, 2015; Label: Ice Age; Formats: Digital download
Money Train: Reloaded	Released: TBA; Label: Ice Age; Formats: Digital download

== Miscellaneous ==
List of miscellaneous albums, with selected information
Title	Album details	Notes
Where Is Mike Jones?	Unreleased; Label: Ice Age, Money Train, Swishahouse, Atlantic, Warner Bros.	
WHO!Print	Unreleased; Label: Ice Age, Money Train, Swishahouse, Atlantic, Warner Bros.	
Guap Season	Released: May 2022; Label: Ice Age, RBC, Money Train, BMG	

== Singles ==
=== As lead artist ===
List of singles as lead artist, with selected chart positions and certifications, showing year released and album name
Title	Year	Peak chart positions			Certifications	Album
Title	Year	US	US R&B	US Rap	Certifications	Album
"Still Tippin'" (featuring Slim Thug and Paul Wall)	2004	60	25	14	RIAA: 2× Platinum	Who Is Mike Jones?
"Back Then"	2005	22	15	6	RIAA: Platinum	Who Is Mike Jones?
"Flossin'" (featuring Big Moe)	2005	—	71	—	RIAA: Gold	Who Is Mike Jones?
"Mr. Jones"	2006	92	54	—		The American Dream
"My 64" (featuring Bun B and Snoop Dogg)	2007	101	53	22		The American Dream
"Drop & Gimme 50" (featuring Hurricane Chris)	2007	—	44	18		The Voice
"Cuddy Buddy" (featuring T-Pain, Lil Wayne and Twista)	2007	76	34	16	RIAA: Gold	The Voice
"Next to You" (featuring Nae Nae)	2008	63	47	8	RIAA: Platinum	The Voice
"Swagg Thru The Roof"	2009	—	—	—		The Voice
"Boi!" (with Young Problemz featuring Gucci Mane)	2009	—	74	—		The Voice
"Leanin' on dat Butter"	2012	—	—	—		Non-album single
"3 Grams" (featuring Slim Thug and Yung Duece)	2014	—	—	—		Where Is Mike Jones?
"—" denotes a title that did not chart, or was not released in that territory.

=== As featured artist ===
List of singles as featured artist, with selected chart positions and certifications, showing year released and album name
Title	Year	Peak chart positions			Certifications	Album
Title	Year	US	US R&B	US Rap	Certifications	Album
"Badd" (Ying Yang Twins featuring Mike Jones and Mr. Collipark)	2005	29	16	6		U.S.A. (United State of Atlanta)
"Long as You Come Home" (Brooke Valentine featuring Mike Jones, Kilo and Paul Wall)	2005	—	71	—		Chain Letter
"They Don't Know" (Paul Wall featuring Mike Jones and Bun B)	2005	—	71	—		The Peoples Champ
"I'm 'n Luv (Wit a Stripper)" (T-Pain featuring Mike Jones)	2005	5	10	—	RIAA: 3× Platinum	Rappa Ternt Sanga
"Way I Be Leanin'" (Juvenile featuring Mike Jones, Paul Wall, Skip and Wacko)	2006	—	118	—		Reality Check
"Pourin' Up" (Pimp C featuring Mike Jones and Bun B)	2006	—	— (Note: "Pourin' Up" did not enter the Hot R&B/Hip-Hop Songs chart, but peaked at number three on the Bubbling Under R&B/Hip-Hop Singles chart.)	—		Pimpalation
"Bounce" (Marc Spitz featuring Paul Wall and Mike Jones)	2010	—	—	—		The Blue
"It Ain't Nothin" (Ultraballin featuring Mike Jones)	2011	—	—	—		Non-album singles
"Handle Mine" (K-Four featuring Mike Jones)	2012	—	—	—		Non-album singles
“On The Grind” (Eroc HistoryMakerz featuring Mike Jones, Life Unda, Reuben McCray)	2019	—	—	—		

=== Promotional singles ===
List of promotional singles, with selected chart positions, showing year released and album name
Title	Year	Peak chart positions	Album
Title	Year	US R&B	Album
"Draped Up" (Remix) (Bun B featuring Lil' Keke, Slim Thug, Chamillionaire, Paul Wall, Mike Jones, Aztek, Lil' Flip and Z-Ro)	2007	45	Trill

== Other charted songs ==
List of other charted songs, with selected chart positions, showing year released and album name
Title	Year	Peak chart positions	Album
Title	Year	US Bub. R&B	Album
"Hold U Down" (Bun B featuring Trey Songz, Mike Jones and Birdman)	2005	6	Trill

== Guest appearances ==
List of non-single guest appearances, with other performing artists, showing year released and album name
Title	Year	Other performer(s)	Album
"Yo Cadillac" (Remix)	2004	Fronze Only, Bun B, Twista	Gutta Wayz
"Tear This Bitch Up"	2004	TQ	Listen
"24's"	2004	Body Head Bangerz, Bun B	Body Head Bangerz: Volume One
"American Pie"	2005	Chingo Bling, Paul Wall	The Tamale Kingpin
"Naked" (Remix)	2005	Marques Houston	Naked
"Joy"	2005	Missy Elliott	The Cookbook
"I Got That Drank"	2005	Frayser Boy, Paul Wall, Three 6 Mafia	Me Being Me
"Hold U Down"	2005	Bun B, Trey Songz	Trill
"Swervin'"	2005	Three 6 Mafia, Paul Wall	Most Known Unknown
"In Case Some Shit Go Down"	2005	Warren G, Frank Lee White	In the Mid-Nite Hour
"Who You Know"	2005	Papoose	Sharades
"Im Da Man"	2006	E-40, Al Kapone	My Ghetto Report Card
"Gansta Grillz"	2006	LeToya Luckett, Killa Kyleon	LeToya
"Torn" (So So Def Remix)	2006	LeToya Luckett, Rick Ross	LeToya
"Live from the Block"	2006	Papoose, Paul Wall	The 1.5 Million Dollar Man
"Swang" (Remix)	2007	Trae, Big Pokey, UGK, Slim Thug, Jim Jones, Big Hawk, Paul Wall, Fat Pat	Tha Truth Show
"Sippin n' Wood Grippin'"	2007	Lil' Flip, Crime Boss	Crown Me
"Stroll"	2007	J Xavier, Lil' Keke	Young Prince of Tha South
"White Cup"	2007	Lil' Flip	I Need Mine
"Fly Boy" (Remix)	2007	Lil' Flip	I Need Mine
"Get Low"	2007	Ron Artest, Nature	My World
"Shine Cause I Grind"	2007	Crime Mob	Hated On Mostly
"Welcome 2 Houston"	2009	Slim Thug, Chamillionaire, Bun B, Paul Wall, Yung Redd, Lil' Keke, Z-Ro, Mike D, Big Pokey, Rob G, Trae, Lil' O, Pimp C	Boss of All Bosses
"I'm Fresh"	2009	DJ Drama, Rick Ross, Trick Daddy	Gangsta Grillz: The Album (Vol. 2)
"Diamonds & Tattoos" (Remix)	2012	Towdown, Triple	Coming Home
"Uber"	2014	Mac Miller	Faces
"Follow Your Lead"	2014	Von Won, Brian Angel	Grace Still Abides
"Corner Boy"	2016	Hypnotiq, Boosie Badazz, Fiend	—N/a

== Video cameos ==
- "Fresh Azimiz" (by Bow Wow)
- "D-Girl (DopeGirl)" (by Brooke Valentine featuring Pimp C)
- "Knockin' Doorz Down" (by Pimp C featuring P.O.P. and Lil Keke)
- "The Game Belongs to Me" (by UGK)
- "Laffy Taffy" (by D4L)
- Gangsta Party" (by Yo Gotti)
