= Brooke Valentine discography =

American singer discography

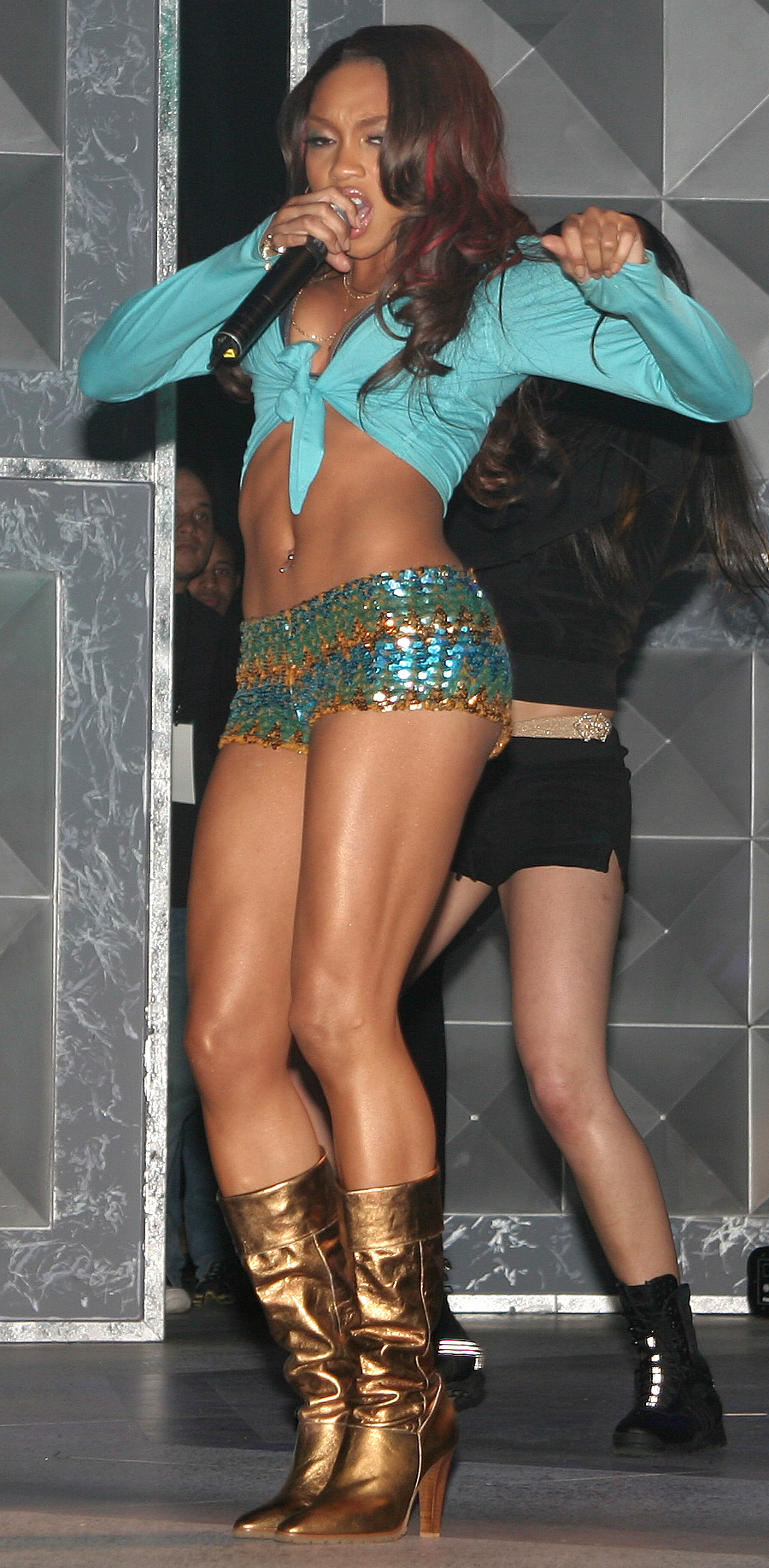
- Valentine performing in March 2005
- Studio albums: 1
- Singles: 16
- Music videos: 6
- Mixtapes: 1

The discography of American R&B singer Brooke Valentine, which consists of one studio album, one mixtape, one EP and sixteen singles.

== Albums ==
=== Studio albums ===
Title	Album details	Peak chart positions	
Title	Album details	US	US R&B
Chain Letter	Released: March 15, 2005; Label: Virgin; Formats: CD, LP, digital download	16	3

=== Mixtapes ===
Title	Album details
Physical Education Mixtape Album	Released: March 17, 2009; Label: Subliminal Distribution; Format: Digital download
Love Letters	Released: February 14, 2013; Label: Subliminal Distribution; Format: Digital download

== EPs ==
Title	EP details
Sip	Released: December 7, 2018; Label: 4Everbrooke; Format: Digital download

== Singles ==
Title	Year	Peak chart positions									Album
Title	Year	US	US R&B	US Adult R&B	AUS	GER	IRL	NZ	SWI	UK	Album
"Girlfight" (featuring Lil Jon and Big Boi)	2005	23	13	—	50	70	47	28	61	35	Chain Letter
"Long as You Come Home" (featuring Paul Wall and Mike Jones)	2005	—	71	—	—	—	—	—	—	—	Chain Letter
"Boogie Oogie Oogie" (featuring Fabolous and Yo-Yo)	2005	—	—	—	—	—	—	—	—	—	Roll Bounce
"D-Girl (DopeGirl)" (featuring Pimp C)	2006	—	92	—	—	—	—	—	—	—	Non-album single
"Pimped Out" (featuring Dem Franchize Boyz)	2006	—	87	—	—	—	—	—	—	—	Physical Education Mixtape Album
"Wish Everyday Was Christmas"	2010	—	—	—	—	—	—	—	—	—	Non-album singles
"Forever"	2012	—	—	—	—	—	—	—	—	—	Non-album singles
"Don't Wanna Be in Love"	2012	—	—	29	—	—	—	—	—	—	Love Letters
"Rub It In"	2012	—	—	—	—	—	—	—	—	—	Non-album singles
"Grow Up"	2016	—	—	—	—	—	—	—	—	—	Non-album singles
"Games"	2016	—	—	—	—	—	—	—	—	—	Non-album singles
"Now"	2017	—	—	—	—	—	—	—	—	—	Non-album singles
"Nothing to Something" (with Marcus Black)	2017	—	—	—	—	—	—	—	—	—	Non-album singles
"Change"	2018	—	—	—	—	—	—	—	—	—	Non-album singles
"Connected"	2018	—	—	—	—	—	—	—	—	—	Sip
"Swear to Gawd" (featuring Bridget Kelly)	2018	—	—	—	—	—	—	—	—	—	Sip
"So Good" (with Marcus Black)	2025	—	—	—	—	—	—	—	—	—	TBA
"Magic" (with Marcus Black)	2025	—	—	—	—	—	—	—	—	—	TBA
"Nobody" (with Marcus Black)	2025	—	—	—	—	—	—	—	—	—	TBA

=== As featured artist ===
Year	Title	Chart positions	Album
Year	Title	US R&B	Album
2004	"Guerilla Nasty" (Guerilla Black featuring Jazze Pha and Brooke Valentine)	79	Guerilla City
2017	"Nobody Knows" (Booby Gibson featuring Brooke Valentine)	—	Non-album singles
2025	"Won't Give Up" (Marcus Black featuring Brooke Valentine)	—	Non-album singles

=== Promotional singles ===
Title	Year	Album
"Cover Girl"	2005	Chain Letter
"#CRAIG"	2016	Non-album promotional singles
"Cream"	2017	Non-album promotional singles

== Guest appearances ==
List of non-single guest appearances, with other performing artists, showing year released and album name
Title	Year	Other artist(s)	Album
"Dutty Wine"	2006	Beenie Man	Undisputed
"Word for Me"	2016	Mickey Shiloh	20sixteen
"My Bae"	2023	Marcus Black	With Love
"Safety Net"	2023	Lady London	S.O.U.L.
"New Birth (The Altar)"	2025	Miles Minnick, Transformation Worship	Via Dolorosa

== Music videos ==
List of music videos, with directors, showing year released
Title	Year	Director(s)
"Girlfight"	2005	Chris Robinson
"Boogie Oogie Oogie"	2005	Kevin Hunter
"D-Girl (DopeGirl)"	2006	Benny Boom
"Insanity"	2012	Deja the Great
"Forever"	2012	Casey Lee
"Don't Wanna Be In Love"	2012	Juwan Lee
"Connected"	2018	—N/a
"WhereDey@"	2019	VonJovey
