= Chick Magnet (album) =

Studio album by Paul Wall
- Released: February 24, 2004
- Genre: Hip hop
- Length: 53:12
- Label: Paid in Full

Paul Wall chronology
Get Ya Mind Correct (2002)	Chick Magnet (2004)	The Peoples Champ (2005)

Chick Magnet is the debut studio album by American rapper Paul Wall. It was released on February 24, 2004, by Paid in Full Records.

== Track listing ==
No.	Title	Length
1.	"They Don't Know" (featuring Mike Jones)	3:42
2.	"Dat's What Dat Is" (featuring Bun B, Killer Mike, and Big Hawk)	4:30
3.	"What Cha Gon Do" (featuring Mr. Pookie and Mr. Lucci)	4:09
4.	"Why You Peepin' Me"	4:15
5.	"Chick Magnet" (featuring Dani Marie)	3:58
6.	"Am What I Am" (featuring Poppy and Slim Thug)	4:05
7.	"Tryin' to Get Paid"	4:13
8.	"Break Bread" (featuring Lew Hawk and Gu-u)	3:51
9.	"Oh No" (featuring Trae)	3:57
10.	"Know What I'm Talkin' About"	4:19
11.	"Did I Change" (featuring Pretty Todd, Unique, and Scooby)	4:40
12.	"Hustler Stackin' Ends" (featuring Big Shasta and Yung Redd)	2:59
13.	"My Life" (featuring Mark G and Kyle Lee)	4:29
Total length:		53:25

== Charts ==
Chart (2004)	Peak position
US Top R&B/Hip-Hop Albums (Billboard)	54
