= 10th Anniversary =

10th Anniversary may refer to:

- 10th anniversary, a wedding anniversary
- 10th Anniversary (Sash! album)
- 10th Anniversary (The Statler Brothers album)
- 10th Anniversary: Platinum Remixes, a compilation album by K.Maro
- 10th Anniversary: Rap-A-Lot Records, a compilation album by Rap-a-Lot Records
- 10th Anniversary (novel), a book in the Women's Murder Club (book series) by James Patterson

== See also ==
- 10th Anniversary Album (disambiguation)
