= Sittin' Sidewayz =

Single by Paul Wall featuring Big Pokey

from the album The Peoples Champ
- Released: August 20, 2005
- Recorded: 2005
- Genre: Southern hip-hop
- Length: 3:50
- Label: Swishahouse; Asylum; Atlantic
- Songwriters: Paul Slayton; Milton Powell; Salih Williams
- Producer: Salih Williams

Paul Wall singles chronology
"Still Tippin'" (2004)	"Sittin' Sidewayz" (2005)	"They Don't Know" (2005)

Music video
- "Sittin' Sidewayz" on YouTube

"Sittin' Sidewayz" is a song by American rapper Paul Wall, released as the first single from his album The Peoples Champ. It features rapper Big Pokey and was produced by Salih Williams. The single's music video, filmed in May 2005, had cameo appearances by Jim Jones, DJ Paul, Juicy J, H.A.W.K. and Bun B. The song samples a line by Big Pokey from his verse on DJ Screw's "June 27th".

The song is featured prominently in the Xbox 360 video game Def Jam: Icon (a video game in which Paul Wall appears as himself providing his own voice and likeness and is a playable character in) and also made appearances in the games SSX on Tour and Midnight Club 3: DUB Edition Remix. It is also featured in the 2006 theatrical film Grandma's Boy.

The song was originally supposed to use the instrumental to Mike Jones' 2005 single "Back Then", and appears on 2005's Paul Wall Mixtape using this instrumental. It was later changed to an original instrumental produced by Michael Watts for the single and album version.

== Other versions ==
Months later, Ghostface Killah and R. Kelly made a remix to "Sittin' Sidewayz" with permission. Later on, a Latin remix was also made by Stunta, Keri Hilson and Lucky Luciano under permission but did not include Big Pokey in it. In 2010, Crooked I also released a freestyle to the song. At the 2026 Houston Rodeo, Forrest Frank brought out Paul Wall for his Sunday set with his own verse with Paul Wall rapping an altered chorus "giving God praise".

== Track listing ==
No.	Title	Writer(s)	Producer(s)	Length
1.	"Sittin' Sidewayz" (Radio)	P. Slayton; M. Powell; S. Williams	Salih Williams	3:49
2.	"Sittin' Sidewayz" (Instrumental)	P. Slayton; M. Powell; S. Williams	Salih Williams	3:49
3.	"Sittin' Sidewayz" (Dirty)	P. Slayton; M. Powell; S. Williams	Salih Williams	3:50

== Charts ==
Chart (2005)	Peak position
US Billboard Hot 100	93
US Hot R&B/Hip-Hop Songs (Billboard)	34
US Hot Rap Songs (Billboard)	24

== Certifications ==
Region	Certification	Certified units/sales
United States (RIAA)	Gold	500,000^{^}
^{^} Shipments figures based on certification alone.
