= John D. Tucker =

American film director

John D. Tucker, known as Dr. Teeth, is an American film director, commercial director, music video director, television producer, and professor. He has directed films such as Warner Brothers Records KeAnthony's A Hustlaz Story, directed commercials for Obamacare initiative Access Health CT and music videos for songs like "Hip Hop Saved My Life" by Lupe Fiasco, "Rock Yo Hips" by Crime Mob, and "Spit Yo Game" by Notorious B.I.G. Tucker is also the founder of the HBCU Film Festival.

== History and career ==
In 1999 he founded the J.D. Tucker Foundation to bridge the gap between the HBCU resources and founded the HBCU Film Festival hosted annually.

Tucker graduated from Texas Southern University. As of present, Tucker serves as an adjunct professor in the Martin Luther King Jr. School of Communications at Texas Southern University.

In 2018, he directed a dark comedy French new wave film, Pas Honteux, and was announced Emerging Directors by the (ABFF) American Black Film Festival.

He worked as a sports producer, video photographer, and editor for Houston's CBS affiliate, KHOU-11.

Dr. Teeth joined Black Entertainment Television’s (BET) in Washington, D.C. where he produced the award-winning youth program, “Teen Summit.” that received an NAACP Image Award for Best Children’s Programming. Later, he produced BET's Rap City and later Co-created Rap City Tha Basement Tucker was responsible for creating the popular performance element of the show "The Booth" on BETs Rap City Tha Basement.

== Awards and nominations ==
In 2005 his video for Mike Jones "Still Tippin" was nominated for an MTV VMA.

Dr. Teeth was also nominated for the 2006 1st Annual BET's Hip Hop Award in the category of Director Of The Year.

He was nominated for 2008 Video Of The Year at the Ozone Awards for Lupe Fiasco's "Hip Hop Saved My Life".

In 2009 Dr. Teeth was nominated in the category of Best Hip Hop Video for Dorrough's “Ice Cream Paint Job” at the BET Hip-Hop awards.
