= The Day After Hell Broke Loose =

Compilation album by Rap-a-Lot Records
- Released: March 23, 2004
- Recorded: 2003–2004
- Genres: Southern hip hop, gangsta rap
- Label: Rap-a-Lot
- Producer: Bigg Tyme

Rap-a-Lot Records chronology
10th Anniversary (1996)	The Day After Hell Broke Loose (2004)

The Day After Hell Broke Loose is a compilation album released by Rap-a-Lot Records in conjunction with producer Bigg Time.

== Background ==
Production was entirely handled by Bigg Time, with famed southern hip hop producer and frequent Rap-a-Lot contributor Mike Dean providing mixing, master and drum programming for the album.

The album serves as a sequel to Swishahouse's 1999 compilation The Day Hell Broke Loose, which was also produced by Bigg Tyme. As such, most of the album features songs performed by Swishahouse members such as Mike Jones, Chamillionaire and Slim Thug, though Rap-a-Lot artists such as Scarface and Devin the Dude also appear on the album. The original version of "Still Tippin'" performed by Jones, Chamillionaire and Slim Thug appeared on this album months before the remix with Paul Wall became a hit.

The Day After Hell Broke Lose peaked at 67 on the Billboard Top R&B/Hip-Hop Albums.

== Reception ==
Professional ratings
Review scores
Source	Rating
AllMusic	3/5 stars

Allmusic's Jason Birchmeier described the album as "sort of a Houston-style Chronic, albeit one that isn't quite as well developed or thought out". He also added "you might want to check this one out, especially if you're a fan of Rap-a-Lot."

== Track listing ==
1. "Intro"- 1:09 (J. Prince)
2. "Still Tippin'"- 4:15 (Mike Jones, Slim Thug and Chamillionaire)
3. "Platinum Stars"- 3:50 (Chamillionaire, Lil Flip and Bun B)
4. "Dick Rider"- :40
5. "We Act Bad"- 3:51 (Da'Costa)
6. "Crazy"- 4:21 (Mike Jones, Dolla Da'Costa and Billy Cook)
7. "Get That Money"- 4:04 (Slim Thug and Scarface)
8. "After Party"- 5:18 (Paul Wall, Dolla Da'Costa and Mangnificent)
9. "Bud Hightower"- :54
10. "Deez Bitches"- 4:01 (Devin the Dude and Dolla Da'Costa)
11. "Z-Ro"- 3:03 (Z-Ro)
12. "Life"- 3:54 (Lil' Ron and Dolla Da'Costa)
13. "The Snitch"- 1:03
14. "Got Us F'd Up"- 4:13 (Lil Mario and J-Dawg)

== Charts ==
Chart (2004)	Peak position
US Top R&B/Hip-Hop Albums (Billboard)	67
