= Girl (Paul Wall song) =

Single by Paul Wall

from the album The Peoples Champ
- Released: January 10, 2006
- Recorded: 2005
- Genre: Hip hop, R&B
- Length: 4:38
- Label: Atlantic
- Songwriters: Paul Slayton, Eugene Record
- Producers: Speez, Continuous

Paul Wall singles chronology
| "They Don't Know" (2005) | "Girl" (2006) | "Drive Slow" (2006) |

"Girl" is the third single from Houston rapper Paul Wall's album The Peoples Champ. It samples the song "Oh Girl" by The Chi-Lites. It peaked at number 35 on the Billboard Hot 100, making it his highest-charting solo single to date. The video of the single also featured comedian Katt Williams and actress Meagan Good.

== Commercial performance ==
"Girl" debuted on the Billboard Hot 100 the week of March 18, 2006 at number 95. It peaked at number 35 the week of May 20, 2006 and held that position for two weeks. It stayed on the charts for sixteen weeks.

== Charts ==
=== Weekly charts ===
| Chart (2006) | Peak position |
|---|---|
| US Billboard Hot 100 | 35 |
| US Pop Airplay (Billboard) | 21 |
| US Hot R&B/Hip-Hop Songs (Billboard) | 42 |
| US Hot Rap Songs (Billboard) | 7 |
| US Rhythmic Airplay (Billboard) | 3 |

=== Year-end charts ===
| Chart (2006) | Position |
|---|---|
| US Rhythmic (Billboard) | 29 |

== Certifications ==
| Region | Certification | Certified units/sales |
|---|---|---|
| United States (RIAA) | Gold | 500,000^{^} |
^{^} Shipments figures based on certification alone.
