= The Peoples Champ =

Studio album by Paul Wall
- Released: September 13, 2005
- Genres: Hip hop, Southern hip-hop
- Length: 69:56; 74:38 (screwed and chopped)
- Labels: Asylum; Atlantic; Swishahouse
- Producers: Paul Wall (also exec.); DJ Paul; Juicy J; DJ Michael "5000" Watts; Grid Iron; Sanchez Holmes; Khao; Kojack; Salih Williams; KLC; Mr. Lee; Kanye West; Speez; Alan Sampson

Paul Wall chronology
Chick Magnet (2004)	The Peoples Champ (2005)	Get Money, Stay True (2007)

Singles from The Peoples Champ
- 1. "Sittin' Sidewayz" Released: August 20, 2005; 2. "They Don't Know" Released: August 29, 2005; 3. "Girl" Released: September 29, 2005; 4. "Drive Slow" Released: June 6, 2006

The Peoples Champ is the commercial debut and second studio album by American rapper Paul Wall. It was released on September 13, 2005, by Atlantic Records, Asylum Records, and Swishahouse. The album debuted at number one on the US Billboard 200, selling 176,000 copies in its first week. This serves as his first number one in two solo studio releases after Chick Magnet (2004). The album was supported by four singles: "Sittin' Sidewayz" (featuring Big Pokey), "They Don't Know", "Girl", and "Drive Slow" (Kanye West featuring Paul Wall and GLC). Both "Sittin' Sidewayz" and "Girl" became a certified gold by the Recording Industry Association of America (RIAA) for selling 500,000 copies each in the United States.

The limited edition of The Peoples Champ features two CDs: disc one contains the original album, while disc two contains the "screwed and chopped" version by DJ Michael "5000" Watts. The Watts mix was released as a stand-alone CD the following week.

The song "They Don't Know" (featuring Mike Jones) also appeared on Wall's debut studio album Chick Magnet, and the song "Drive Slow" also appeared on Kanye West's album Late Registration.

== Critical reception ==
Professional ratings
Review scores
Source	Rating
AllMusic	3.5/5 stars
Blender	3/5 stars
HipHopDX	3.5/5 stars
Okayplayer	2.5/5 stars
Pitchfork	7.9/10
RapReviews	8/10
Rolling Stone	3.5/5 stars
The Situation	3/5

The Peoples Champ received generally positive reviews from music critics. Pitchfork writer Tom Breihan credited newcomer producer Grid Iron for providing some consistent beats throughout the album and Wall for being an above-average rapper saying, "So Wall is a good rapper, but not a great one. But then, this is 2005, and all a rapper needs to make a good album is enough great, complementary beats and guest appearances to keep the whole thing interesting all the way through." AllMusic's Andy Kellman also praised Wall as a rapper, saying his flow is something that "always fits into the fabric of the track." Jonah Weiner of Blender lauded Wall's ability to lace crafty wordplay about the typical hip-hop tropes, saying that "This is materialism at its most mesmerizing." K. B. Tindal of HipHopDX praised the album for its party tracks but was looking for some substance throughout it, saying that "After actually listening to the project it was worth the wait but still could have been a little more introspective with more heartfelt tracks. [...] For the most part it is what it is; shit-talking made to sound good." Usman Sajjad of The Situation praised the album for its production and catchy party tracks, concluding that "With new hustles like his grills and various endorsements with Reebok and other companies, Paul Wall gives evidence with his debut 'The People’s Champ', that Houston still flows strongly through his blood, whilst moving one foot into mainstream Hip Hop."

== Track listing ==
No.	Title	Writer(s)	Producer(s)	Length
1.	"I'm a Playa" (featuring Three 6 Mafia)	Paul Slayton; Paul Beauregard; Jordan Houston	DJ Paul; Juicy J	4:25
2.	"They Don't Know" (featuring Mike Jones)	Slayton; Michael Jones; Calvin Earl; Todd Berry; Bernard Freeman; Chad Butler	Grid Iron	3:43
3.	"Ridin' Dirty" (featuring Trey Songz)	Slayton; Tremaine Neverson; Earl; Berry	Grid Iron	4:27
4.	"State to State" (featuring Freeway)	Slayton; Leslie Pridgen; Marquinarius "Sanchez" Holmes	Sanchez Holmes	4:12
5.	"So Many Diamonds" (featuring T.I.)	Slayton; Clifford Harris, Jr.; Kevin "Khao" Cates	Khao	3:58
6.	"Smooth Operator"	Slayton; Allan "Kojack" Grigg; Leroy Hutson; Michael Hawkins	Kojack	3:15
7.	"Sittin' Sidewayz" (featuring Big Pokey)	Slayton; Milton Powell; Salih Williams	S. Williams	3:52
8.	"Internet Going Nutz"	Slayton; Craig Lawson	KLC	4:43
9.	"Trill" (featuring B.G. and Bun B)	Slayton; Christopher Dorsey; Freeman; Earl; Berry	Grid Iron	4:08
10.	"Sippin' Tha Barre"	Slayton; Leroy "Mr. Lee" Williams	Mr. Lee	4:39
11.	"Drive Slow" (performed by Kanye West featuring Paul Wall and GLC)	Kanye West; Slayton; Leonard Harris	West	4:33
12.	"March N Step" (featuring Grit Boys and Lil Wayne)	Slayton; Darius Coleman; Dominic Harris; Dwayne Carter, Jr.; Earl; Berry	Grid Iron	3:47
13.	"Got Plex" (featuring Archie Lee and Cootabang)	Slayton; Archie "Lee" Tatmon	Speez; Continuous	3:45
14.	"Girl"	Slayton; Eugene Record	Speez; Continuous	4:38
15.	"Big Ballin'"	Slayton; Earl; Berry	Grid Iron	4:01
16.	"Sip-N-Get High" (featuring Aqualeo)	Slayton; Acie "Aqualeo" High; Alan Sampson; Clinton Ray; Eric Mitchell	Sampson	3:45
17.	"Just Paul Wall"	Slayton; Earl; Berry	Grid Iron	4:11
Total length:				69:56

Screwed & Chopped by DJ Michael "5000" Watts
No.	Title	Length
1.	"Intro"
2.	"Sittin' Sidewayz" (featuring Big Pokey)
3.	"Big Ballin'"
4.	"March N Step" (featuring Grit Boys and Lil Wayne)
5.	"State to State" (featuring Freeway)
6.	"Trill" (featuring B.G. and Bun B)
7.	"Girl"
8.	"Just Paul Wall"
9.	"So Many Diamonds" (featuring T.I.)
10.	"Smooth Operator"
11.	"Got Plex" (featuring Archie Lee and Cootabang)
12.	"They Don't Know" (featuring Bun B)
13.	"Ridin' Dirty" (featuring Trey Songz)
14.	"Internet Going Nutz"
15.	"I'm a Playa" (featuring Three 6 Mafia)
16.	"Sip-N-Get High" (featuring Aqualeo)
17.	"Drive Slow" (performed by Kanye West featuring Paul Wall and GLC)
18.	"Outro"

Sample credits

- "I'm a Playa" samples "I Got That Drank" as performed by Frayser Boy, Mike Jones, and Paul Wall, and "Still Tippin'" as performed by Mike Jones, Slim Thug, and Paul Wall.
- "They Don't Know" samples "Pimp tha Pen" as performed by DJ Screw and Lil' Keke; "Murder" as performed by UGK; "3rd Coast" as performed by Fat Pat, "Wood Wheel" as performed by UGK; and "Still Pimpin' Pens" as performed by Lil' Keke.
- "Smooth Operator" samples "Never Know What You Can Do (Give It a Try)", written and performed by Leroy Hutson.
- "Sittin' Sidewayz" samples "June 27th (Part 2)" as performed by DJ Screw, Big Moe, and Big Pokey of S.U.C.
- "Internet Going Nutz" samples "Still Tippin'" as performed by Mike Jones, Slim Thug, and Paul Wall.
- "Sippin' Tha Barre" samples "Get Crunk" as performed by Crooked Lettaz and Pimp C.
- "Girl" samples "Oh Girl", written by Eugene Record, as performed by Chi-Lites.
- "Just Paul Wall" samples "Long Ago and Far Away" as performed by Earl Klugh.

== Charts and certifications ==
=== Weekly charts ===
Chart (2005)	Peak position
US Billboard 200	1
US Top R&B/Hip-Hop Albums (Billboard)	1

=== Year-end charts ===
Chart (2005)	Position
US Billboard 200	147
US Top R&B/Hip-Hop Albums	43
Chart (2006)	Position
US Billboard 200	191
US Top R&B/Hip-Hop Albums	62

=== Certifications ===
Region	Certification	Certified units/sales
United States (RIAA)	Platinum	1,000,000^{^}
^{^} Shipments figures based on certification alone.

== See also ==
- List of Billboard 200 number-one albums of 2005
- List of Billboard number-one R&B albums of 2005
