= Drive Slow =

2005 single by Kanye West

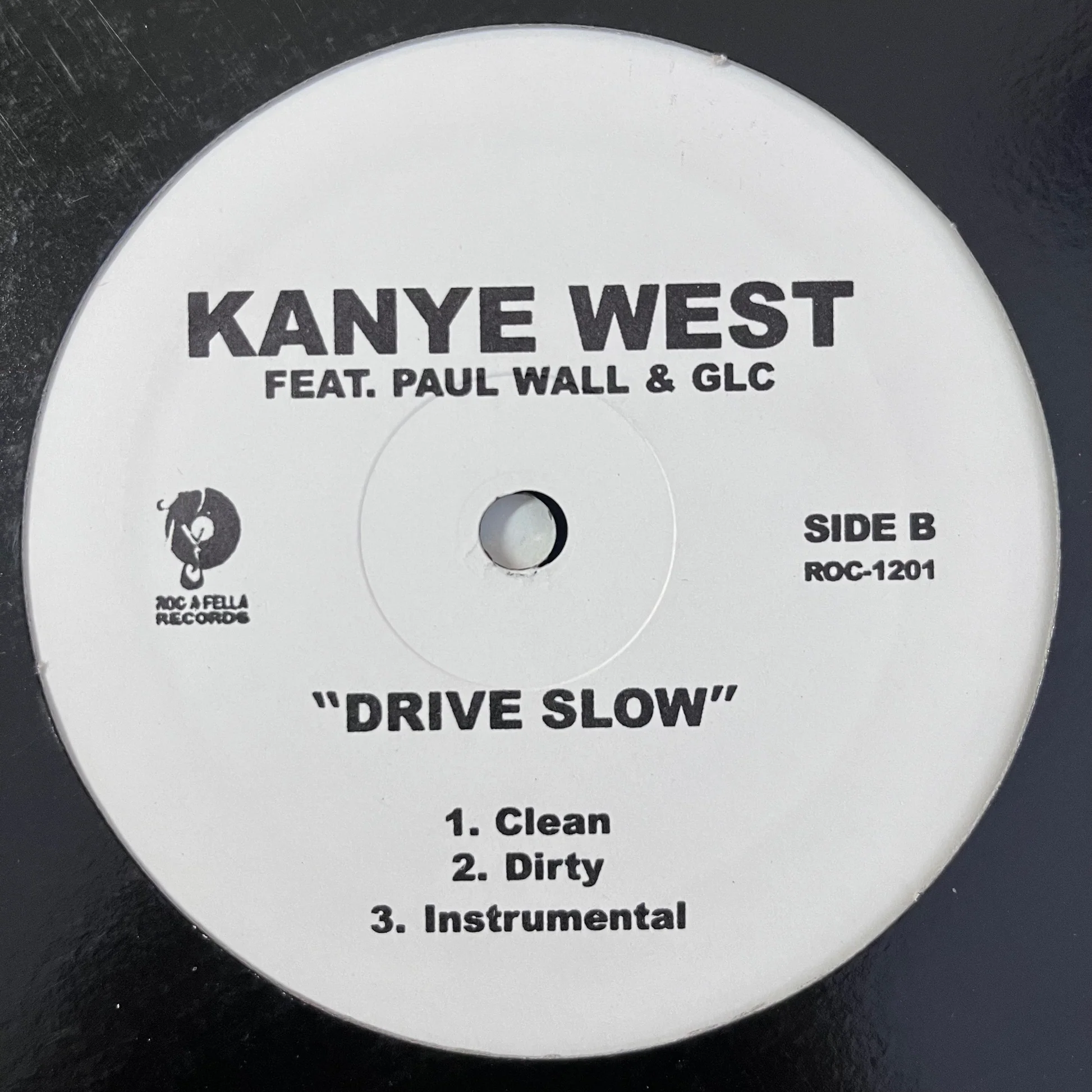
- Side B of the "We Major"/"Drive Slow" single

Single by Kanye West featuring Paul Wall and GLC

from the album Late Registration and The Peoples Champ
- A-side: "We Major"
- Released: June 6, 2006
- Studio: The Record Plant (Hollywood); Chalice Recording (Hollywood)
- Genre: Jazz rap
- Length: 4:32
- Label: Roc-A-Fella; Def Jam; Atlantic; Asylum; Swishahouse
- Songwriters: Kanye West; Paul Slayton; Leonard Harris
- Producer: Kanye West

Kanye West singles chronology
"Impossible" (2006)	"Drive Slow" (2006)	"Grammy Family" (2006)

Paul Wall singles chronology
"Holla at Me" (2006)	"Drive Slow" (2006)	"About Us" (2006)

"Drive Slow" is a song by American rapper Kanye West. The song features guest appearances from fellow rappers Paul Wall and GLC, and additional vocals by American recording artist Tony "Penafire" Williams. It was produced by West, who wrote the song alongside the featured artists. The song originally appeared on Kanye West's second studio album, Late Registration, and was later included on Paul Wall's debut studio album, The Peoples Champ, as well. Drive Slow was released on a 12" vinyl on June 6, 2006 by Roc-A-Fella and Def Jam as the fifth and final single from the album. A hip hop track, it contains elements of jazz. The song features a sample of Hank Crawford's cover version of "Wildflower".

The lyrics of the song use car culture for a metaphor discussing people's fast-paced lifestyles, and also give warnings of certain dangers. "Drive Slow" received universal acclaim from music critics, frequently being praised for its lyrical content. Some highlighted Paul Wall's verse, while other critics complimented the production. Despite being acclaimed, the song did not receive significant airplay. It has been certified gold in the United States by the Recording Industry Association of America (RIAA). West performed the song for his debut live album, Late Orchestration (2006).

A remix of "Drive Slow" was recorded, which includes a feature from rapper T.I. After receiving a call from West, he recorded his verse for the remix. An accompanying music video premiered via MTV, though was never released. In the video, Mali drives West around the neon lights of the Fremont Street Experience in downtown Las Vegas. West, Paul Wall, GLC, and T.I. performed the remix at Power 106's Powerhouse 2006 event.

== Background and recording ==
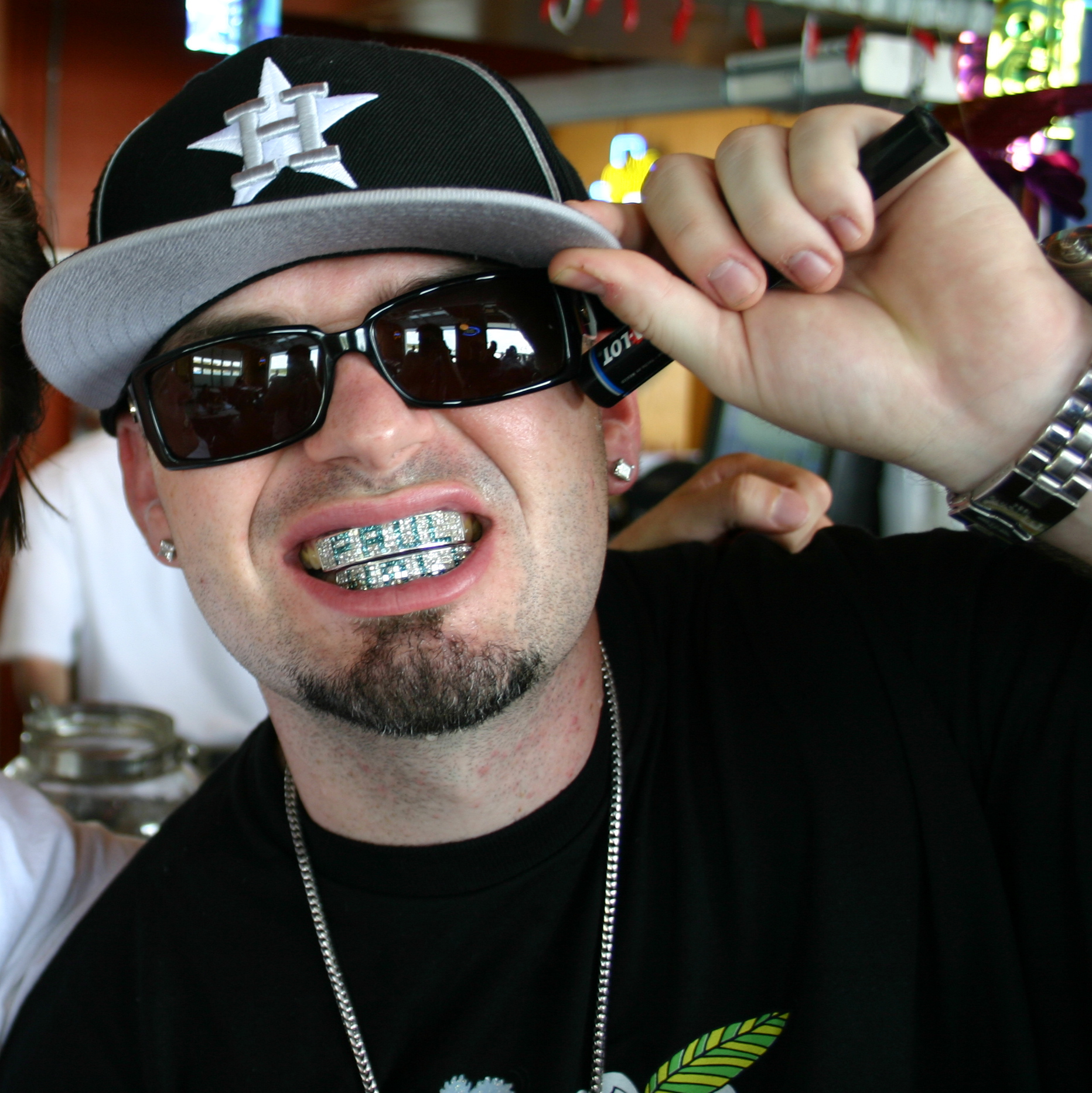
Paul Wall believed he was being Punk'd before recording his guest appearance on the song.

Paul Wall revealed that his verse on "Drive Slow" was originally the first verse the rapper wrote for his single "Sittin' Sidewayz" (2005). However, he thought the rhymes "didn't really go hand-in-hand with that beat" despite liking them, and decided to save the verse for a future collaboration with "someone big like Slim Thug". After he had made grills for West and been in a Houston studio with him, Paul Wall ended up connecting with him for a collaboration. He admitted that the two of them collaborating on a song "was unbelievable" due to West's iconic status, recalling him and a friend being confronted by two detectives as he got off the plane at Los Angeles International Airport (LAX) to meet up with West. Paul Wall elaborated, explaining because of them not having "anything illegal" in their bags that they questioned if the detectives were "for real" and said he expected "to get Punk'd". Later, the driver of his car to the studio was pulled over by a police officer for skipping a red light while Paul Wall was in the back seat and he confessed to thinking, "They didn't get me in the airport because how I handled them, but now they playing. They really punking me." Paul Wall revealed that he persuaded the officer to let him leave by saying he was late for a studio session with West and the officer eventually let him go to the studio while telling him, "This has nothing to do with you." After the collaboration had been recorded, Paul Wall recalled that he did not believe it was included on Late Registration until DJ Drama contacted him.

In June 2005, it was reported that British rapper M.I.A. had been previously slated to appear on the album before its final track listing revealed her not featured. West announced that she declined the opportunity to collaborate with him, due to her being "really busy;" M.I.A.'s schedule included her releasing multiple projects and promoting her single "Galang" (2003). He had requested her to feature on "Drive Slow", though Paul Wall filled in for her appearance. Alongside him, the song features GLC and contains additional vocals from Tony "Penafire" Williams. West solely handled the production of the song and co-wrote it with Paul Wall and GLC. Explaining the song during a listening session for the album in June 2005, West said: "This is one of my favourite tracks; that's my 'Big Pimpin''." With its light groove, the song significantly marked West giving a "cautionary rap" to those who came from his area.

== Composition and lyrics ==
Musically, "Drive Slow" is a hip hop track, with syrup influences. The track includes elements of jazz, which was described as being mashed with "narcotic funk" by The A.V. Club. The song contains a looped sample of the alto sax from a Hank Crawford recording of a cover version of "Wildflower" by the Canadian band Skylark. The use of the sample, along with a steady descending quarter-note tone, which plays on each downbeat, interpolates Tupac's "Shorty Wanna Be A Thug". The track features a light beat groove. Paul Wall contributes one verse, with him rapping 16 lines. For the last 30 seconds of "Drive Slow", the track is chopped and screwed; the speed slows down to 16 revolutions per minute (RPM).

In the lyrics, car culture is used to create a metaphor about living a fast lifestyle. The lyrics also provide warnings of the dangers brought on by fame, wealth, and luxury. West starts the song by recalling versions of childhood stories, which include him raving about an American car driver named Mali, as he reminiscences on being young, broke and ambitious, before the featured artists start rapping. In a performance that was called "hypnotic" by Blender, Paul Wall expresses his love for candy paint and vintage rims. Certain lyrics of the song give an endorsement to kerb crawling.

== Release and reception ==
On August 30, 2005, "Drive Slow" was released as the sixth track on West's second studio album Late Registration. Prior to release, the song had been played during a listening session for the album at Sony Music Studios in New York City on August 5, 2005. The song was later included as the eleventh track on Paul Wall's second studio album The Peoples Champ, released on September 13, 2005. On June 6, 2006, a 12" vinyl was released for the song in the United States, through Roc-A-Fella and Def Jam. "Drive Slow" was the B-side to the vinyl, while fellow album track "We Major" was the A-side. The song had a lack of airplay, which West himself admitted. On September 1, 2021, "Drive Slow" was awarded a gold certification by the Recording Industry Association of America (RIAA) for amassing 500,000 certified units in the US.

"Drive Slow" was met with universal acclaim from music critics, who generally praised the lyrical content. Writing for Blender, Jonah Weiner lauded the song as the album's "most dynamic paradox", calling it a "salute to car culture" while praising Paul Wall's verse and West's production. Sean Fennessey of Pitchfork labeled the song "woozy" and complimented the verse from Paul Wall, highlighting his lyricism. Tiny Mix Tapes reviewer Matty G named the song one of the highlights of Late Registration, admitting that it gives some people "what will probably be their first taste of screw music" while hailing Paul Wall's feature for blending with the beat. Entertainment Weekly critic David Browne opined that the song "starts with West spinning childhood stories", before "guest rappers overtake him". Comparing "Drive Slow" to fellow album track "Crack Music", The Guardian's Alexis Petridis said the lyrics "initially offer a cheerful endorsement of kerb crawling" before the song is chopped and screwed. Petridis admitted that the technique being used "entirely changes the song's mood" and concluded by saying the song suggests West "effortlessly outstripping his peers" with "more ideas, better lyrics, bigger hooks, greater depth". In The New York Times, Jon Pareles noted West "tries to be the same endearing, socially conscious guy" that he portrayed on his debut studio album The College Dropout (2004) by reflecting on when he was "young, broke and ambitious".

Some reviewers directed praise specifically towards the production. Nathan Rabin from The A.V. Club commented that the song contains "strange yet hypnotic mashing of jazzy film-noir atmospherics and screwed-up narcotic funk", which he stated "amply" rewards repeated listens. In a review of Late Registration for The Village Voice, Robert Christgau cited the song as being among the "secret brilliance" and called it a "star-as-shorty reminiscence" that "winds down into a dire fog". Eric Henderson of Slant Magazine analyzed that the song's speed is cranked down "in a furtive nod to the 'chopped and screwed' craze", which de-emphasizes "the sound's druggy haze" while "seemingly aiming for a thoughtful brood". He continued, describing the chopping and screwing as a transgression that "explains why most of the pop-cultural cognoscenti are feeling the itch to rewire [West's] jaw". Prefix Mag writer Matthew Gastieir commended the song's production, noting it for being "where Kanye's already syrupy laid-back jazz meets Screw". For Time, Josh Tyrangiel selected the song as one of the album's best tracks.

== Live performances and appearances in media ==
On September 29, 2005, West delivered a performance of the song at Abbey Road Studios in London for his debut live album Late Orchestration (2006). While showcasing artists signed to his record label GOOD Music, West performed the song with GLC for South by Southwest (SXSW) at the Levi's/Fader Fort on March 21, 2009. Early copies of The Peoples Champ were distributed with a bonus disc, which included an extended version of "Drive Slow". In 2008, American record producer J. R. Rotem used a vocal sample of the song to produce rapper The Game's track "LAX Files" from his third studio album LAX.

== Remix ==
"Drive Slow (Remix)"

Song by Kanye West featuring T.I., Paul Wall and GLC

from the album King
- Released: 2006
- Genre: Alternative hip hop
- Length: 5:18
- Label: Grand Hustle; Atlantic
- Songwriters: Clifford Harris; Kanye West; Paul Slayton; Leonard Harris
- Producer: Kanye West

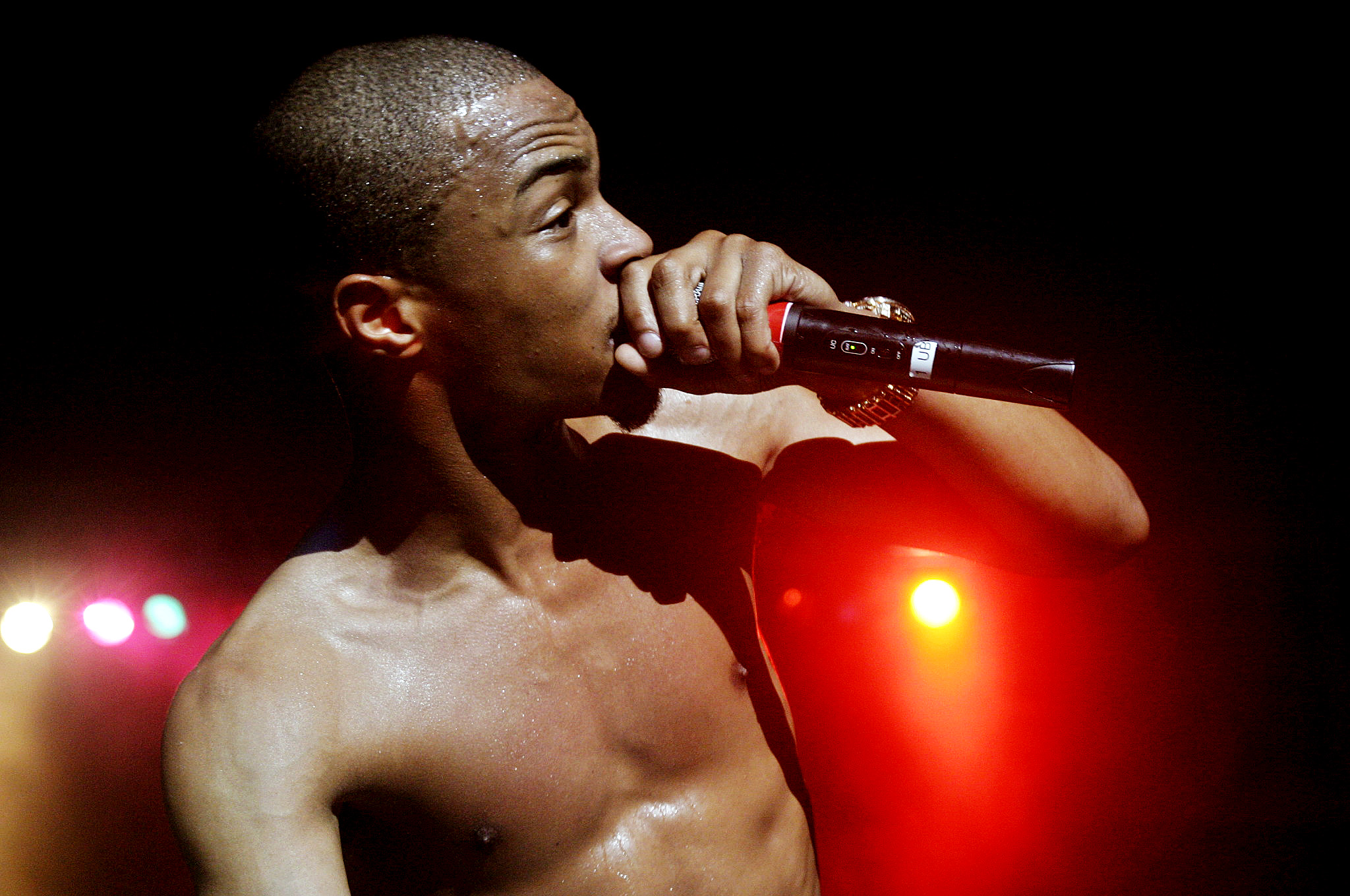
The remix features a guest verse from T.I., who recorded his verse after talking with West on a call.

The remix of "Drive Slow" features a guest appearance by rapper T.I. Discussing the collaboration, West called T.I. "the hottest rapper out". The rapper recounted receiving a call from West and being asked to get on the song with a verse, while he admitted it felt strange that "the song was already five, six minutes long". T.I. said he questioned West about what he should do, who reassured him that he only needed to contribute a verse; the rapper then recorded his verse. Despite being one that loves the remix, T.I. recalled not having heard it played in full often, further stating: "I've never heard anywhere — any club, any radio station — the whole thing played from start to finish and I'm the last the verse [sic] [laughs]." He went on to compare the remix to fellow rapper Big Sean's "Control" (2013) that features Kendrick Lamar and Jay Electronica, explaining that nobody has "heard Jay Electronica's verse yet" on the over 7–minutes long track. In the lyrics, T.I. raps reflectively.

An accompanying music video, directed by West collaborator Hype Williams, premiered on MTV; however, the video did not have an official release. Paul Wall said of his collaboration with Williams that it is "a highlight of any artis[t's] career". T.I. imposed the question to him of, "What are you going to do with this mini movie? This is a short film." It was filmed in Reno and at the Fremont Street Experience in downtown Las Vegas, in Nevada. The music video features cameos from Paul Wall and T.I. The video shows cars in the neon lights of Las Vegas throughout. Mali drives West around, after she was tricked into doing so by him and Williams. At two minutes and four seconds in, the Reno Arch is shown. To further promote the remix, West, Paul Wall, GLC, and T.I. performed it live at Power 106's summer fest Powerhouse 2006. For the performance, T.I. arrived in a style reminiscent of the backpacker era of the early 1990s, wearing Ralph Lauren clothing and a leather backpack.

== Track listing ==
US 12" vinyl

A-side

1. "We Major" (Clean)
2. "We Major" (Dirty)
3. "We Major" (Instrumental)

B-side

1. "Drive Slow" (Clean)
2. "Drive Slow" (Dirty)
3. "Drive Slow" (Instrumental)

== Credits and personnel ==
Information taken from Late Registration liner notes.

Recording

- Recorded at The Record Plant (Hollywood, CA) and Chalice Recording Studios (Hollywood, CA)
- Mixed at Chalice Recording Studios (Hollywood, CA)

Personnel

- Kanye West – songwriter, producer
- Paul Slayton – songwriter
- Leonard Harris – songwriter
- Anthony Kilhoffer – recorder
- Richard Reitz – recorder, assistant engineer
- Andrew Dawson – recorder
- Mike Dean – mix engineer
- Nate Connelly – assistant engineer
- Mike Mo – assistant engineer
- Tony "Penafire" Williams – additional vocals

== Certifications ==
Certifications for "Drive Slow"
Region	Certification	Certified units/sales
United States (RIAA)	Gold	500,000^{‡}
^{‡} Sales+streaming figures based on certification alone.

== Release history ==
Release dates and formats for "Drive Slow"
Region	Date	Format	Label(s)	Ref.
United States	June 6, 2006	12" vinyl	Roc-A-Fella; Def Jam	
