= 10th Anniversary Album =

10th Anniversary Album may refer to:

- 10th Anniversary Album (The Ventures album), 1970
- 10th Anniversary Album (Nat King Cole album), 1955
