= Mr. Pookie =

American rapper

- Also known as: Tha Rippla
- Born: Bryan Jones; March 27, 1978 (age 48)
- Origin: Dallas, Texas, United States
- Genres: Southern hip hop
- Occupation: Rapper
- Years active: 1998–present
- Label: Stoney Crook Records

Mr. Pookie (born Bryan Jones on March 27, 1978) is an American rapper from the "Dirty South" of Dallas, Texas. He is most notable for having the biggest-selling (according to Soundscan) independent rap album from Dallas thus far, 1999’s Tha Rippla. Mr. Pookie records both individually and with his rap partner Jeron Gibson, or Mr. Lucci, with whom he also co-owns their labels, Crawl 2 Ball Records, which is now Stoney Crook Recordz and the music publishing company/production house Stoney Crook Music. Jones attended L.V. Berkner High School, where he was later kicked out at 11th grade in Richardson, Texas. Mr. Pookie also has ties with rapper Southside Reggie.

== Career ==
Mr. Pookie featured in 1998 on Tha Rockla, the only solo release by K-Roc, on Icon Recordings (later Iconic) out of Dallas. Hailing from North Dallas, the two paired along with a crew dubbed Stoney Crook – named for the rough-and-tumble Stoney Brook apartment complex on Audelia Rd. where the crew lived and rapped together. Featured on such local underground hits as "Hittin’ Hard" and "Unfuckwitable", Mr. Pookie became a standout in the burgeoning Texas rap music scene.

In late 1999, Mr. Pookie released his own solo album, Tha Rippla, the Dirty South rap classic CD featuring guest appearances by K-Roc, Remontis (later renamed Mr. Montis), C-Pone, Chuck/Juwell, Solo, plus a then unknown 15-year-old rap prodigy named Mr. Lucci (Jeron Gibson). The album, fueled by hits such as “Crook 4 Life”, and the popular underground pro-marijuana hit “Smoke One”—went on to sell over 90,000 copies of its regular and chopped-and-screwed versions combined, and is considered an Essential Album on both Allmusic and Amazon.com.

The next year, Jones returned the favor to his young protégé Mr. Lucci by making several key appearances on Lucci’s solo debut, Diabolical.

The Iconic recordings exclusively featured the production of its owner Kevin A., Mr. Pookie & Mr. Lucci were originally affiliated with Iconic Recordings but left to form their own label Crawl 2 Ball a short time later after a bitter, protracted dispute with the label owner over non-payment of royalties. In 2003, the duo Mr. Pookie & Mr. Lucci independently released both the regular double-disc and the chopped & screwed single-disc versions of My Life (which peaked at #59 on Billboard R&B/Hip-Hop Album Charts in April 2004), selling the CDs hand-to-hand, out of the trunks of their cars and hand-delivering them personally to small mom-and-pop record stores in Texas, Louisiana, Arkansas and beyond, and moving over 40,000 units by themselves and local distribution. Mr. Pookie, along with Mr. Lucci, also collaborated with Paul Wall in 2004 on “What Cha Gon’ Do”, a track on Wall’s last independent solo album, Chick Magnet. Pookie also appeared on several popular local and regional mixtape CDs, including an underground homemade Best Of Mr. Pookie CD/DVD combination in 2005.

His January 2006 label debut Return Of Tha Rippla on Crawl 2 Ball/Boss Entertainment distributed by Fontana Distribution/Universal Music Group, has already produced a lead single, “Don’t Test Us” (featuring Mr. Lucci & Mr. Montis), which has charted on 3 Billboard charts, peaking at #6 on the R&B/Hip-Hop Singles Sales chart and #19 on the Hot 100 Singles Sales chart.

== Discography ==
=== Albums ===
- Tha Rippla (1999)
- Tha Rippla (Chopped & Screwed) (2000)
- My Life (Double Disc) – Mr. Pookie & Mr. Lucci (2003) - #59 Billboard R&B/Hip-Hop Albums
- Return Of Tha Rippla (2006)
- Mr. Pookie & Mr. Lucci Present: It's All Us (2007) - Produced By RoyaltySound.com
- Mr. Pookie & Mr. Lucci: Still Crook'n (2009)
- Mr. Pookie & Mr. Lucci: The 10th Anniversary: Tha Classicc (2010)
- Ventation of A Crook (2010)
- Blue Flame (2013)
- Mr Pookie Presents: Crook Watch, Vol. 2 (2014)
- Crookology (2017)

=== Singles ===
Year	Title	U.S. Hot 100	U.S. R&B	U.S. Rap	Album
2000	"Crook 4 Life"	-	-	-	Tha Rippla
2003	"Gangsta"	-	-	-	My Life
2005	"Don't Test Us" (featuring Mr. Lucci)	-	90	-	Return of Tha Rippla

== Appearances ==
- Tha Rockla – K-Roc (1998)
- Diabolical – Mr. Lucci (2001)
- Texas Freestyle Massacre – Various Artists (2001)
- The Chick Magnet by Paul Wall (“What Cha Gon’ Do” feat. Mr. Pookie & Mr. Lucci) (2004)
- DJ Smallz: Southern Smoke Special Edition: Dallas Crooks Mixtape (2005)
- Revelation Mr. Montis (coming 2009)

Nawf me Up (2021)

== See also ==
- Southern Rap
- Hip-Hop
