= Girlfight (song) =

2005 single by Brooke Valentine

Single by Brooke Valentine featuring Big Boi and Lil Jon

from the album Chain Letter
- Released: January 4, 2005
- Genre: Crunk; R&B
- Length: 3:54
- Label: Virgin
- Songwriters: D. Johnson; Penelope Magnet; Antwan Patton; J. Smith; Chris "Tricky" Stewart; Brooke Valentine
- Producer: Lil Jon

Brooke Valentine singles chronology
"Girlfight" (2005)	"Long as You Come Home" (2005)

Big Boi singles chronology
"A.D.I.D.A.S." (2003)	"Girlfight" (2005)	"U Got Me!!!" (2005)

Lil Jon singles chronology
"Real Nigga Roll Call" (2004)	"Girlfight" (2005)	"Toma" (2005)

"Girlfight" is a song by American R&B singer Brooke Valentine featuring American rappers Big Boi and Lil Jon. It served as the lead single from her debut album, Chain Letter. The song is about a tension between two girls who end up in a catfight and was a US top-30 hit, peaking at number 23 on the Billboard Hot 100 in June 2005. A remix featuring Da Brat, Ms. B, and Remy Ma was also made.

== Online game ==
An online game titled Brooke Valentine Presents Celebrity Girl Fight was released online where the user fights female celebrities, including Ciara, Beyoncé, Paris Hilton, Jennifer Lopez, Lindsay Lohan and Lil' Kim.

== Track listings ==
US 12-inch single

A1. "Girlfight" (clean radio edit) – 3:36
A2. "Girlfight" (instrumental) – 3:33
A3. "Girlfight" (clean a capella) – 3:34
B1. "Girlfight" (explicit radio edit) – 3:36
B2. "Girlfight" (explicit extended edit) – 3:55
B3. "Girlfight" (explicit a capella) – 3:35

UK CD single

1. "Girlfight" (album version) – 3:54
2. "Girlfight" (remix) – 4:12

UK 12-inch single

A1. "Girlfight" – 3:54
A2. "Girlfight" (remix) – 4:12
B1. "Girlfight" (reggaeton remix) – 4:14

European CD single

1. "Girlfight" (album version) – 3:54
2. "Girlfight" (remix) – 4:12
3. "Girlfight" (reggaeton mix) – 4:14
4. "Girlfight" (instrumental) – 3:33
5. "Girlfight" (video) – 3:45

Australian CD single

1. "Girlfight" – 3:54
2. "Thrill of the Chase" – 3:07
3. "Girlfight Pt. II" – 3:21

== Charts ==
=== Weekly charts ===
Chart (2005)	Peak position
Australia (ARIA)	50
Australian Urban (ARIA)	17
Germany (GfK)	70
Ireland (IRMA)	47
New Zealand (Recorded Music NZ)	28
Switzerland (Schweizer Hitparade)	61
Scotland Singles (Official Charts)	42
UK Singles (Official Charts)	35
UK Hip Hop/R&B (Official Charts)	11
US Billboard Hot 100	23
US Hot R&B/Hip-Hop Songs (Billboard)	13
US Pop Airplay (Billboard)	30
US Rhythmic Airplay (Billboard)	7

=== Year-end charts ===
Chart (2005)	Position
US Billboard Hot 100	85
US Hot R&B/Hip-Hop Songs (Billboard)	70
US Rhythmic Top 40 (Billboard)	38

== Release history ==
Region	Date	Format(s)	Label(s)	Ref.
United States	January 4, 2005	Digital download	Virgin	
United States	January 18, 2005	Rhythmic contemporary; urban radio	Virgin	
Australia	April 18, 2005	CD	Virgin	
United States	April 25, 2005	Contemporary hit radio	Virgin	
United Kingdom	July 4, 2005	12-inch vinyl; CD	Virgin	
