= Mr. Lucci =

American rapper

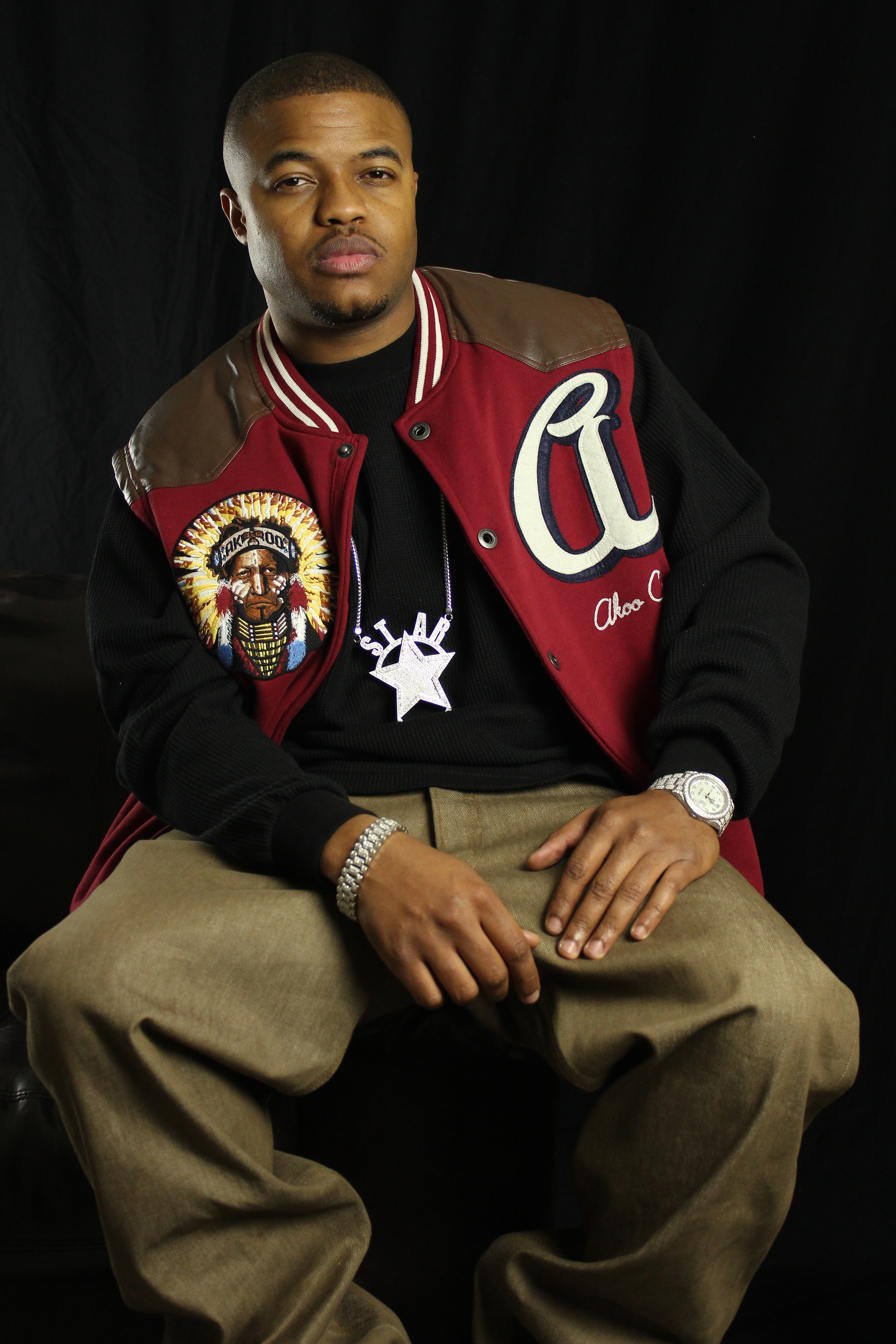
- Mr. Lucci in a promotional photo

Background information
- Also known as: Lu Diamond
- Born: Jeron C. Gibson; November 15, 1982 (age 43)
- Origin: Dallas, Texas, United States
- Genre: Hip hop
- Occupations: Rapper; songwriter; actor; entrepreneur
- Years active: 1999–present
- Labels: Iconic Records; Diamond Music Group
- Website: mrlucci.com

Jeron C. Gibson (born November 15, 1982), better known by his mononym Mr. Lucci or sometimes by Lu Diamond, is an American hip hop recording artist, actor and entrepreneur. In 2001, Mr. Lucci released his first album Diabolical, followed by My Life (2004), 100% Real (2007), 10th Anniversary (2010), V.V.S. (2011) and Certified 1ct (2012).

== Early life ==
Born in Lone Star, Texas, Lucci was the son of a preacher and the youngest of three children. After the death of his father, Lucci and his family moved to Dallas. There his interest in music grew as he sat next to a stereo and wrote lyrics to old rap and R&B songs that played, which lead to the development of his writing skills. Lucci's big break came his freshman year when his brother introduced him to the owner of the local barber shop. Craig asked Lucci to rap something, so Lucci freestyle, he asked Lucci to rap once again, so Lucci continued to freestyle. The following day Craig and Kevin A., C.E.O of Iconic Records, asked Lucci's mother for approval to work with the then 15-year-old.

== Career ==
In 1999, at the age of sixteen, Mr. Lucci joined Iconic Records as the youngest member of the label. Kevin A. featured Mr. Lucci on Mr. Pookie's solo album, Tha Rippla, notably inn the songs "Crook For Life" and "Smoke One", which quickly grew to be crowd favorites across the Southern Region. In 2001, Mr. Lucci released his first solo album, Diabolical, with guest appearances by Mr. Montis, Mr. Pookie and Big Chief and the Iconic Records owner, Kevin A., who used his own production ("Ghetto House Muzik"). The album's popularity was fueled by hits such as the title track "Diabolical" and the popular underground pro-marijuana hit "Getting High". Diabolical sold 50,000+ units. (Diabolical and Tha Rippla still hold the title for most units sold by an independent artist from Dallas, according to Nielsen Sound Scan). A short time later, Mr. Lucci and Mr. Pookie left Iconic Recording to form their own label, Crawl 2 Ball, after a bitter, protracted dispute with the label owner over non-payment of royalties.

In 2003, Mr. Lucci and Mr. Pookie established Stoney Crook Records, an independent record label on which they released both the regular double-disc and the chopped and screwed single-disc versions of My Life (which peaked at #59 on Billboard R&B/Hip-Hop Album Charts in April 2004), selling the CDs hand-to-hand from the trunks of their cars and hand-delivering them personally to small mom-and-pop record stores in Texas, Louisiana, Arkansas and beyond, and moving over 40,000 units by themselves and local distribution. Mr. Lucci, along with Mr. Pookie, also collaborated with Paul Wall in 2004 on "What Cha Gon’ Do", a track on Wall's last independent solo album, Chick Magnet. Mr. Lucci collaborated with Mr. Pookie and Mr. Montis in 2005 on "Don't Test Us" Mr. Pookie's Return of Tha Rippla album, which entered the Billboard charts on the "Hot R&B/Hip-Hop Songs" with a five-week run peeking at #90.

In 2007, Mr. Lucci branched out on his own to release 100% Real with distribution through Select-O-Hits and under the direction of the executive producer Cyber Sapp, a well known producer best known for the Gucci Mane single "Freaky Girl". Sapp's production work on 100% Real includes ″Tough Love″ which features Deonte' from Dallas, "I Like It" featuring Stub-a-lean, "Bout Gone" featuring Bohagon and Twista, "100% Real", "Actin'", "Flippin Through My City" and "Hater Season".

In early 2010, Mr. Lucci and Mr. Pookie reunited for a 10th anniversary album titled Tha Classic, released by their independent Stoney Crook Records. In 2011, with the recent success and positive feedback from their fans, they released solo projects but utilized one another by releasing both albums on the same day and combining their marketing tools as a unit. Both albums were released by Stoney Crook Records. In 2012, Mr. Lucci and Mr. Pookie agreed it was time separate, leaving Stoney Crook Records to Mr. Pookie. Mr. Lucci, along with his business partner, laid the foundation for Star City Music Group on which he released a solo album, Certified 1ct, featuring artists such as Stub-a-lean and Killa Kyleon, distributed by SoSouth.

In 2013, Mr. Lucci collaborated with the Maybach Music Group official DJ A Bay Bay, Dorrough, Big Chief, T.Cash, Pooca Leroy, Young Black and Tum Tum to make their city anthem "I'm From Dallas".

In January 2016, Gibson turned himself in to federal prison on felony drug charges.

== Discography ==
- 2001: Diabolical
- 2004: My Life
- 2007: 100% Real
- 2010: 10th Anniversary
- 2011: V.V.S.
- 2012: Certified 1ct

=== Mixtapes ===
Year	Mixtape titles	DJ
2001	Mr. Lucci & Mr. Pookie: Texas Freestyle Massacare (August 7, 2001)	
2004	Mr. Lucci: My Testimony (August 13, 2004)	
2005	Fear Factor Music: Dallas Crooks (April 3, 2005)	DJ Smallz
2006	Street Pharmacy: Southern Flows Vol.3 (November 21, 2006)	
2007	Stoney Crook: It's All Us (March 6, 2007)	Rapid Ric
2010	Algierz: Still Crook'n (February 2, 2010)	
2013	Southern Smoke: 14 Day Theory (March 5, 2013)	DJ Smallz

== Guest appearances ==
List of guest appearances with other performing artists
Title	Year	Other artist(s)	Album
Abstract Hustle	2010	Paul Wall	10th Anniversary
1 Deep	2011	Lil' Wil	V.V.S.
Bout Gone	2011	Twista, Bohagon	V.V.S.
Bout Money	2011	Trae The Truth	V.V.S.
I Love It	2012	Killa Kyleon	Certified 1ct
Problems	2014	Alley Boy	2ct
Make A Play	2014	Yo Gotti	2ct
