= The Voice (Mike Jones album) =

Studio album by Mike Jones
- Released: April 28, 2009
- Recorded: 2006–09
- Genre: Hip hop
- Length: 62:06
- Labels: Ice Age; Swishahouse; Asylum; Warner Bros.
- Producers: Big E; Mike Dean; Dat Boy Chyco; Jim Jonsin; Bigg D; Amadeus; Mr. Collipark; Mannie Fresh; J. R. Rotem; Swole; Essay Potna; Kojack; Myke Diesel

Mike Jones chronology
The American Dream (2007)	The Voice (2009)

Singles from The Voice
- 1. "Drop & Gimme 50" Released: November 27, 2007; 2. "Cuddy Buddy" Released: May 19, 2008; 3. "Next to You" Released: December 2, 2008; 4. "Swagg Thru Da Roof" Released: April 21, 2009; 5. "Boi!" Released: March 24, 2009

The Voice is the second studio album by American rapper Mike Jones. It was released on April 28, 2009, by Warner Bros. Records, Asylum Records, Ice Age Entertainment, and Swishahouse. Production was handled by several producers, including Jim Jonsin, Mr. Collipark, J. R. Rotem and Big E, among others.

The album sold 25,000 copies in its first week, debuting at number 12 on the US Billboard 200 on April 22, 2009. As of February 1, 2014, the album has sold 200,000 copies in the United States.

== Singles ==
The album's lead single "Drop & Gimme 50" features Hurricane Chris. The album's second single "Cuddy Buddy" featuring T-Pain, Twista and Lil Wayne. The album's third single "Next to You" featuring Nae Nae. The album's fourth single "Swagg Thru The Roof" featuring Swole. The album's fifth single "Boi!" featuring Young Problemz.

== Critical reception ==
Professional ratings
Review scores
Source	Rating
AllMusic	2.5/5 stars
DJBooth	2.5/5 stars
RapReviews	7/10
The Smoking Section	2.5/5 stars

The Voice garnered mixed reviews from music critics. AllMusic's David Jeffries gave praise to the album's three singles and "Give Me a Call" but felt the rest of the track listing contained "redundant cuts and overdone party numbers" with Jones' overused gimmicky catchphrases. He called the record a "significant step up" from The American Dream EP. Nathan Slavik of DJBooth highlighted both "Next to You" and "Cuddy Buddy" as potential radio chart-toppers but found the album going into "unlistenable territory" with tracks ranging from a "half-baked" dance craze ("Drop & Gimmie 50"), butchering of a celebratory anthem ("Happy Birthday") and "Scandalous Hoes II". Slavik concluded by giving his take on Jones' next project: "Sadly expectations will be low after The Voice, here's hoping he truly delivers something unexpected." Conversely, Steve 'Flash' Juon from RapReviews praised Jones for delivering a decently paced album that has catchy beats to invigorate the collaborative tracks while also showcasing both his lyrical and vocal improvements from the past four years, concluding with "Regardless of the reasons it's clear that Mike Jones is a more seasoned and polished pro of the rap game, and The Voice is planning to have a long career in hip-hop music. Let's hope there's no more politics and bullshit getting in the way of his career."

== Track listing ==
No.	Title	Writer(s)	Producer(s)	Length
1.	"Intro"			0:48
2.	"Swagger Right"	Michael Jones; Elimu Tabasuri	Big E	4:13
3.	"Houston Oilers"	Jones; Michael Dean	Mike Dean	4:36
4.	"Boi!" (featuring Young Problemz)	Jones; Brandon Solomon; Justin Gilbert; Armond Davis, Jr.; Jerry Davis; Jabari Teamer; Marcus Goree; Stefan Jordan	Dat Boy Chyco	4:17
5.	"Cuddy Buddy" (featuring Lil Wayne, T-Pain, and Twista)	Jones; Dwayne Carter; Faheem Najm; Carl Mitchell	Bigg D; Jim Jonsin	4:44
6.	"I Know" (featuring Trey Songz)	Jones; Tremaine Neverson; Antwan Thompson	Amadeus	3:50
7.	"Drop & Gimme 50" (featuring Hurricane Chris)	Jones; Christopher Dooley; Cortez Davis; Michael Crooms; Marlon Horton; Corey Dennard; Adam Piggott; Jonathan Dumas	Mr. Collipark; The Package Store	4:07
8.	"Give Me a Call" (featuring Devin the Dude)	Jones; Devin Copeland; Byron Thomas	Mannie Fresh	5:13
9.	"Happy Birthday"	Jones; Dean	Mike Dean	4:30
10.	"Next to You" (featuring Nae Nae)	Jones; Jonathan Rotem	J.R. Rotem	3:42
11.	"Swagg Thru the Roof" (featuring Swole)	Jones; Dumas	Swole	3:48
12.	"On Top of the Covers" (featuring Essay Potna)	Jones; Blake Phillip	Essay Potna	4:11
13.	"Scandalous Hoes (skit)"			0:30
14.	"Scandalous Hoes II" (featuring T-Pain)	Jones; Najm; Edward Charles	Kojack	3:50
15.	"Hate on Me" (featuring Tanya Herron)	Jones; Dean	Mike Dean	4:28
16.	"Grandma II" (featuring Kai)	Jones; Dean	Mike Dean	5:29

iTunes bonus tracks
No.	Title	Producer(s)	Length
17.	"I Got It" (featuring UGK)	Myke Diesel	3:57
18.	"Shit on Boyz" (featuring King Mello, Lil' Flip, and Killa Kyleon)	Mike Dean	4:55
