= 10th Anniversary: Rap-a-Lot Records =

10th Anniversary

Compilation album by Rap-a-Lot Records
- Released: November 19, 1996
- Recorded: 1988–1996
- Genres: Gangsta rap, Southern hip-hop
- Length: 70:50
- Label: Rap-a-Lot / Virgin
- Producer: James Smith

Rap-a-Lot Records chronology
| 10th Anniversary (1996) | The Day After Hell Broke Loose (2004) |

Professional ratings
Review scores
| Source | Rating |
|---|---|
| Allmusic | 2.5/5 stars |

10th Anniversary: Rap-A-Lot Records is a compilation album released by Rap-a-Lot Records to celebrate the label's tenth anniversary. The compilation contained 11 hits from the likes of the Geto Boys, Scarface and the 5th Ward Boyz, as well as two previously unreleased songs ("Sunshine" by Scarface and "Don't Give No..." by Do or Die). Former 1 of the Girls member, Nina Creque, daughter of jazz musician Neal Creque, is featured on the previously unreleased "Sunshine" by Scarface.

10 Anniversary peaked at 48 on the Top R&B/Hip-Hop Albums.

== Track listing ==
| No. | Title | Performing Artist | Length |
|---|---|---|---|
| 1. | "Mind Playing Tricks on Me" | Geto Boys | 5:05 |
| 2. | "Reasons" | 5th Ward Boyz | 5:02 |
| 3. | "Psycho" | Ganksta N-I-P | 4:20 |
| 4. | "Ever So Clear" | Bushwick Bill | 5:57 |
| 5. | "Bald Headed Hoes" | Willie D | 4:18 |
| 6. | "Bring It On" | Rap-A-Lot All-Starz | 8:16 |
| 7. | "Playa Playa" | Big Mike | 4:44 |
| 8. | "You Don't Hear Me Doe" | DMG | 4:02 |
| 9. | "5th Ward" | Raheem | 5:06 |
| 10. | "Damn It Feels Good to Be a Gangsta" | Geto Boys | 5:09 |
| 11. | "Mr. Scarface" | Scarface | 5:48 |
| 12. | "Hand of the Dead Body" | Scarface | 4:38 |
| 13. | "Sunshine (featuring Nina Creque)" | Scarface | 4:45 |
| 14. | "Don't Give No..." | Do or Die | 3:40 |

== Charts ==
| Chart (1996) | Peak position |
|---|---|
| US Top R&B/Hip-Hop Albums (Billboard) | 48 |
