= Cuddy Buddy =

Single by Mike Jones featuring Trey Songz, Lil Wayne and Twista

from the album The Voice and The American Dream (Target Bonus Track)
- Released: May 19, 2008 (U.S.)
- Recorded: 2007
- Genre: Dirty rap; pop-rap
- Length: 4:46
- Label: Cuddy/Ice Age Entertainment/Warner Bros.
- Songwriters: Derrick Baker, Dwayne Carter, Jim Johnson, Mike Jones, Carl Terrell Mitchell, James Scheffer, Faheem Rashad Najm
- Producers: Bigg D and Jim Jonsin

Mike Jones singles chronology
"Drop & Gimme 50" (2007)	"Cuddy Buddy" (2008)	"Next to You" (2008)

Trey Songz singles chronology
"Ride" (2008)	"Cuddy Buddy" (2008)	"I Need a Girl" (2009)

Lil Wayne singles chronology
"Mrs. Officer" (2008)	"Cuddy Buddy" (2008)	"Got Money" (2008)

Twista singles chronology
"Money" (2008)	"Cuddy Buddy" (2008)	"Wetter" (2009)

"Cuddy Buddy" (also called "Cutty Buddy") is the second single from Mike Jones' second album The Voice. The single version features Trey Songz, Lil Wayne and Twista. The album version features T-Pain instead of Songz. It was produced by Bigg D and Jim Jonsin. The song samples Keith Sweat's "How Deep is Your Love".

It was released to radio stations on May 19, 2008.

== Alternate versions ==
The version that was released on iTunes on October 14, 2008 was the music video version, which features Trey Songz and Twista, but excludes Lil Wayne. Later, the version with Lil Wayne was also released onto the music store. The original version which was leaked in February 2008, included T-Pain over Trey Songz. This version eventually made the cut for the album. The original song, "Cutty Buddy" is from Trillville featuring T-Pain and was recorded in late 2006.

== Music video ==
The music video premiered on Mike Jones' MySpace page on October 8, 2008. Lil Wayne's verse is not included in the video version. Neither Trey Songz, T-Pain, or Twista make appearances in the video. Mike Jones stated that the reason is that the different labels didn't clear the artists to be on the video. However, Lil Chuckee shows up briefly wearing a red Young Money Tee.

== Charts ==
Chart (2008)	Peak position
US Billboard Hot 100	76
US Hot R&B/Hip-Hop Songs (Billboard)	34
US Hot Rap Songs (Billboard)	16
US Pop 100 (Billboard)	64
US Rhythmic Airplay (Billboard)	15

== Certifications ==
Region	Certification	Certified units/sales
United States (RIAA)	Gold	500,000^{‡}
^{‡} Sales+streaming figures based on certification alone.
