= Drop & Gimme 50 =

Single by Mike Jones featuring Hurricane Chris

from the album The Voice & The American Dream (Target Bonus Track)
- Released: November 27, 2007
- Recorded: 2007
- Genre: Bounce
- Length: 4:08
- Label: Ice Age Ent. / Swishahouse / Asylum / Warner Bros.
- Songwriters: Mr. Collipark, Cortez D. Davis, Hurricane Chris (rapper), Jonathan Bashan Dumas, Mike Jones, Adam James Pigott
- Producer: Mr. Collipark

Mike Jones singles chronology
"Turnin' Headz" (2007)	"Drop & Gimme 50" (2007)	"Cuddy Buddy" (2008)

Hurricane Chris singles chronology
"The Hand Clap" (2007)	"Drop & Gimme 50" (2007)	"Playas Rock" (2007)

"Drop & Gimme 50" is the lead single by American rapper Mike Jones from his second album, The Voice. The song was produced by Mr. Collipark, and features Hurricane Chris.

== Charts ==
Chart (2008)	Peak position
US Hot R&B/Hip-Hop Songs (Billboard)	44
US Hot Rap Songs (Billboard)	18
