= My 64 =

Single by Mike Jones featuring Bun B and Snoop Dogg

from the EP The American Dream
- B-side: "Like What I Got"
- Released: April 24, 2007
- Recorded: 2006
- Genre: G-funk
- Length: 5:11
- Label: Ice Age Entertainment; Asylum; Warner Bros. Records
- Songwriters: Eric Wright; O'Shea Jackson; Calvin Broadus; Michael Jones; Bernard Freeman; Andre Young; Salih Williams
- Producer: Salih Williams

Mike Jones singles chronology
"Mr. Jones" (2006)	"My 64" (2007)	"Turning Heads" (2007)

Bun B singles chronology
"Git It" (2006)	"My 64" (2007)	"Down in tha Dirty" (2007)

Snoop Dogg singles chronology
"Boss' Life" (2007)	"My 64" (2007)	"9mm" (2007)

"My 64" is the second single from Mike Jones' extended play The American Dream. It features rappers Bun B and Snoop Dogg. It samples "Boyz-n-the-Hood" by Eazy-E. The radio version doesn't feature Snoop's outro and the last chorus that follows thus the airplay single is 3:55 long.

The video for "My 64" was shot on April 19, 2007 and was directed by John "Dr. Teeth" Tucker. It features the artists driving through Los Angeles. One of the cars used is the same as the one Snoop made his entrance to the Video Music Awards of 2005 in.

"64" refers to a 1964 Chevrolet Impala, which is pictured on the single cover. The car has long been a favorite of lowrider customizers.

== Music video ==
- Director(s): Dr. Teeth
- Production co: The Filming Co.
- Rep: Labuda Management

The video for "My 64" was shot on April 19, 2007 and was directed by John "Dr. Teeth" Tucker. It features the artists driving through Los Angeles. One of the cars used is the same as the one Snoop made his entrance in to the 2005 Video Music Awards. NFL quarterback Vince Young appears in the video, in various scenes riding in the passengers seat of the Impala. Also, where Eazy-E is sampled, his son Lil Eazy-E lip-synches the words to his father's verse. Additionally, Nino Cappuccino, comedian Alex Thomas, and rapper Chino XL make cameo appearances.

== Track listing ==
US 12"

1. "My 64" (Radio Edit) – 3:54
2. "My 64" (Instrumental) – 5:22
3. "My 64" (Acappella) – 5:11
4. "My 64" (Album Version) – 5:11
5. "Like What I Got" (Radio Edit) – 3:05
6. "Like What I Got" (Instrumental) – 3:05
7. "Like What I Got" (Acappella) – 2:52
8. "Like What I Got" (Album Version) – 3:05

== Charts ==
Chart (2007)	Peak position
US Bubbling Under Hot 100 (Billboard)	1
US Hot R&B/Hip-Hop Songs (Billboard)	53
US Hot Rap Songs (Billboard)	22
US Rhythmic Airplay (Billboard)	36

== Remix ==
- "My 64 (Remix)" Feat. The Game, Bun B, and Snoop Dogg from the mixtape You Know What It Is Vol. 4
