= The American Dream (Mike Jones EP) =

EP by Mike Jones
- Released: November 20, 2007 (U.S.)
- Recorded: 2006–07
- Genre: Southern hip-hop
- Length: 28:00
- Labels: Ice Age; Swishahouse; Asylum; Warner Bros.
- Producers: Mike Jones, Mike Diesel, Salih Williams of Carnival Beats

Mike Jones chronology
Who Is Mike Jones? (2005)	The American Dream (2007)	The Voice (2009)

Singles from The American Dream
- 1. "Mr. Jones" Released: September 5, 2006; 2. "Turnin' Headz" Released: January 20, 2007; 3. "My 64" Released: April 24, 2007

Professional ratings
Review scores
Source	Rating
AllMusic	2/5 stars
XXL	(L)

The American Dream is the name of the planned second studio album, debut EP, and first DVD movie by Mike Jones. It was released through his own label Ice Age Entertainment, Swishahouse, Asylum Records, and Warner Bros. Records on November 20, 2007. It was originally supposed to be released on May 15, 2007 as an album but was down graded to an EP due to low confidence from the label. The EP includes two songs, "Still Tippin'" and "Back Then", from Mike Jones' last album Who Is Mike Jones?.

The release date of the album was moved between numerous points from November 2006 and late 2007. His third album is called The Voice.

The album was produced by Salih Williams of Carnival Beats and Myke Diesel.

The album successfully charted on multiple Billboard music charts, having been featured on the Billboard 200, peaking at number 183. It performed considerably better on the Top Rap Albums chart, peaking at number 10, and number 28 on the Top R&B/Hip-Hop Albums chart.

== Track listing ==
Original EP Tracklist

1. "Turning Headz" – 3:11
2. "My 64" (featuring Bun B and Snoop Dogg) – 5:11
3. "Mr. Jones – 4:00
4. "Like What I Got – 3:03
5. "Still Tippin'" (featuring Slim Thug and Paul Wall) – 4:32
6. "Back Then" – 4:04
7. "Shine Cause I Grind (remix)" (Crime Mob featuring Mike Jones) (Digital Bonus Track) – 4:03

New 2009 Tracklist

1. "Turning Heads"
2. "Like What I Got"
3. "Cutty Buddy" (featuring Twista, T-Pain, and Lil Wayne)
4. "Swagger Right"
5. "Drop & Gimme 50" (featuring Hurricane Chris)
6. "Mr. Jones"
7. "My 64" (featuring Bun B and Snoop Dogg)
8. "Swagg Thru the Roof" (featuring Swole)
9. "Next to You" (featuring Nae Nae)
10. "I Know" (featuring Trey Songz)
11. "Scandalous" (featuring Lil' Bran)
12. "Happy Birthday"
13. "Houston Oilers"
14. "Gimme a Call" (featuring Devin the Dude)
15. "On Top of the Covers"
16. "Boi!" (featuring Young Problemz!)
17. "Hate On Me"
18. "I Got It" (featuring UGK)
19. "Boi!" (featuring Young Problemz and Gucci Mane) (Remix iTunes Bonus Track)
