= Who Is Mike Jones? =

Studio album by Mike Jones
- Released: April 19, 2005
- Genre: Hip hop
- Length: 51:37
- Label: Warner Bros.; Asylum; Swishahouse
- Producer: Michael "5000" Watts (exec.); Pretty Todd; Salih Williams; DJ Paul; Juicy J; Young Hollywood; Kojack

Mike Jones chronology
| Who Is Mike Jones? (2005) | The American Dream (2007) |

Singles from Who Is Mike Jones?
- 1. "Still Tippin'" Released: November 12, 2004; 2. "Back Then" Released: February 15, 2005

Who Is Mike Jones? is the debut studio album by American rapper Mike Jones, released on April 19, 2005 in the United States through Asylum Records and Swishahouse. The singles from the album are "Still Tippin'" and "Back Then".

The CD also comes in a "limited edition" version, which includes a bonus CD featuring nearly all the tracks from the album chopped and screwed by DJ Michael 5000 Watts.

The album was a commercial success for the rapper, debuting at number 3 on the Billboard 200 with 181,000 copies sold in its first week and was certified Platinum by the RIAA, two months after its release.

The songs "Got It Sewed Up (Remix)" and "Back Then" are featured in the 2007 Xbox 360 video game Def Jam: Icon. Mike Jones is a playable character in the video game and provides his own voice and likeness.

== Critical reception ==
Professional ratings
Review scores
| Source | Rating |
|---|---|
| AllMusic | 2.5/5 stars |
| Blender | 2/5 stars |
| Pitchfork | 7.0/10 |
| RapReviews | 6.5/10 |
| Rolling Stone | 3.5/5 stars |
| The Situation | 3/5 |

Steve 'Flash' Juon of RapReviews found Jones lacking in terms of charisma and topic matter as a rapper but praised the beats by Salih Williams throughout the record saying, "The bottom line is that Who Is Mike Jones? is a very enjoyable album if you're not paying attention too closely." Nathan Brackett of Rolling Stone called the album "a fine introduction to this Texas mess." AllMusic's Andy Kellman said that the people throughout the record outshine Jones but found him accessible to listen to, concluding that "Jones is ultimately very likable, shown best in the closing track, a sweet tribute to his supportive late grandmother." Samantha Watson of The Situation praised the southern production, Jones's attention-grabbing delivery and the tracks for being lyrically different, concluding that, "This is a welcomed debut from the rapper Mike Jones. It may sound cliché, but with nearly every track echoing his name and with his sharp rhymes it will be hard to forget who he is." Julianne Shepherd of Pitchfork also praised the album's production and noted that Jones shows some empathy on tracks like "5 Years from Now" and "Grandma", saying that, "Who Is Mike Jones? is an ample showcase for Swishahouse producers Michael K. Watts and Salih Williams, but it'd be a better record if Jones diversified."

== Track listing ==
=== Original release ===
| No. | Title | Writer(s) | Producer(s) | Length |
|---|---|---|---|---|
| 1. | "Intro" | | | 0:25 |
| 2. | "Back Then" | Michael Jones | Salih Williams | 4:04 |
| 3. | "Flossin'" (featuring Big Moe) | M. Jones; Timothy Allen; Glenn Jones | Mike B. | 3:11 |
| 4. | "Still Tippin'" (featuring Paul Wall and Slim Thug) | Stayve Thomas; M. Jones; Paul Slayton; Michael Watts | Salih Williams; Michael "5000" Watts | 4:32 |
| 5. | "Got It Sewed Up (Remix)" | M. Jones | Salih Williams; DJ Paul (co.); Juicy J (co.) | 3:18 |
| 6. | "Scandalous Hoes" (featuring Lil Bran) | M. Jones; Thom Bell; Linda Creed | Kojack | 3:23 |
| 7. | "Screw Dat" | M. Jones | Salih Williams | 3:19 |
| 8. | "Turning Lane" | M. Jones | Sears | 4:22 |
| 9. | "Laws Patrolling" (featuring CJ, Mello, and Lil Bran) | M. Jones | Sears | 2:53 |
| 10. | "5 Years from Now" (featuring Lil Bran) | M. Jones | Salih Williams | 3:47 |
| 11. | "Cuttin' (Remix)" | M. Jones | Salih Williams | 3:51 |
| 12. | "What Ya Know About" (featuring Paul Wall and Killa Kyleon) | M. Jones; Slayton; Kyle Riley | Pretty Godd | 3:44 |
| 13. | "Know What I'm Sayin" (featuring Bun B and Lil' Keke) | Bun B; M. Jones; Lil' Keke | Salih Williams | 4:07 |
| 14. | "Type of Nigga U Need" | M. Jones | Young Hollywood | 3:57 |
| 15. | "Grandma" | M. Jones; Kevin McCord | Antwan "Amadeus" Thompson | 5:15 |

=== Chopped & Screwed version ===
1. Got It Sewed Up [Mix]
2. Screw Dat [Mix]
3. Cuttin' [Mix]
4. Still Trippin' [Mix] featuring Slim Thug and Paul Wall
5. Back Then [Mix]
6. Know What I'm Sayin' [Mix] featuring Bun B and Lil' KeKe
7. Laws Patrolling [Mix] featuring CJ, Mellow and Lil' Bran
8. Turing Lane [Mix]
9. Grandma [Mix]
10. Flossin' [Mix] featuring Big Moe
11. Scandalous Hoes [Mix] featuring Lil' Bran
12. What Ya Know About... [Mix] featuring Paul Wall and Killa Kyleon
13. 5 Years From Now [Mix] featuring Lil' Bran

=== Sample credits ===
- "Back Then"
  - "Boyz-N-The-Hood" (1987) by Eazy-E
  - "Still Tippin'" (2004) by Mike Jones feat. Slim Thug and Paul Wall
- "Flossin'"
  - We've Only Just Begun" (1987) by Glenn Jones
- "Still Tippin'"
  - "William Tell Overture" by Gioachino Rossini (from a 1990 recording by South German Philharmonic Orchestra and Alfred Scholtz)
- "Got It Sewed Up"
  - "The Nutcracker, Act 2, No 1: Dance of the Sugarplum Fairy" (1892) by Pyotr Ilyich Tchaikovsky
- "Scandalous Hoes"
  - "Thank You Baby" (1975) by The Stylistics
- "Grandma"
  - "Keep Dancing" (1979) by Al Hudson and the Partners

=== Notes ===
- The original version of "Got It Sewed Up" (under the title, Got It Sowed Up) can be found on The Day Hell Broke Loose 2.
- The original version of Cuttin’ was previously released on 1st Round Draft Picks.

== Personnel ==
Credits for Who Is Mike Jones? adapted from AllMusic.

- Coota Bang – freestyle
- DJ Paul – mixing
- Michael Foster – mixing
- Mike Frost – art direction, photography
- G Dash – executive producer
- Brian "Big Bass" Gardner – mastering
- Juicy J – mixing
- Kojack – audio production
- Archie Lee – freestyle
- Mike B. – audio production
- Towdown – mixing
- Michael Watts – audio production
- Salih Williams – audio production
- Young Sears – audio production

== Charts ==
=== Weekly charts ===
Weekly chart performance for Who Is Mike Jones?
| Chart (2005) | Peak position |
|---|---|
| US Billboard 200 | 3 |
| US Top R&B/Hip-Hop Albums (Billboard) | 1 |
| US Top Rap Albums (Billboard) | 1 |

=== Year-end charts ===
Year-end chart performance for Who Is Mike Jones?
| Chart (2005) | Position |
|---|---|
| US Billboard 200 | 40 |
| US Top R&B/Hip-Hop Albums (Billboard) | 17 |

== Certifications ==
Certifications and sales for Who Is Mike Jones?
| Region | Certification | Certified units/sales |
|---|---|---|
| United States (RIAA) | Platinum | 1,000,000^{^} |
^{^} Shipments figures based on certification alone.

== See also ==
- List of Billboard number-one R&B albums of 2005
- List of number-one rap albums of 2005 (U.S.)
