= 10th Anniversary Album (The Ventures album) =

Studio album by The Ventures
- Released: 1970
- Length: 67:23
- Label: Liberty

10th Anniversary Album is a studio album by the Ventures, which was released to commemorate the band's 10th anniversary in 1970. It is a double LP that features covers of classic 1960s pop hits, including songs by The Beatles and Simon & Garfunkel. It also contains songs from the early 1970s, such as "Who'll Stop the Rain" and "Bridge Over Troubled Water." The album peaked at #91 on the Billboard 200 chart.

== Track listing ==
In parentheses, the performers that made these songs popular.

1. "Everybody's Talkin'" (Fred Neil, Nilsson)
2. "Sweet Caroline" (Neil Diamond)
3. "Medley: Who'll Stop the Rain / Bad Moon Rising" (Creedence Clearwater Revival)
4. "Michelle" (The Beatles)
5. "Good Morning Starshine" (Galt MacDermot from the musical Hair)
6. "Bridge over Troubled Water" (Simon & Garfunkel)
7. "Eleanor Rigby" (The Beatles)
8. "The Sounds of Silence" (Simon & Garfunkel)
9. "Strangers in the Night" (Wayne Newton, Frank Sinatra)
10. "Those Were the Days" (Mary Hopkin)
11. "MacArthur Park" (Richard Harris)
12. "Medley: Blowin' in the Wind / Don't Think Twice, It's All Right" (Bob Dylan)
13. "Up, Up and Away" (The Fifth Dimension)
14. "By the Time I Get to Phoenix" (Glen Campbell)
15. "Raindrops Keep Fallin' on My Head" (B.J. Thomas)
16. "Let It Be" (The Beatles)
17. "Sugar, Sugar" (The Archies)
18. "Never My Love" (The Association)
19. "Delilah" (Tom Jones)
20. "Hey Jude" (The Beatles)
21. "Spinning Wheel" (Blood, Sweat & Tears)

Was available on Liberty Records LST 35000, eight track cartridges 9077 and cassettes C 1077 Stereo.
