= Mr. Jones (Mike Jones song) =

Single by Mike Jones

from the EP The American Dream
- Released: September 5, 2006
- Recorded: 2006
- Genre: Southern hip hop
- Length: 3:58
- Label: Ice Age Entertainment, Asylum, Warner Bros.
- Songwriters: Mike Jones, Michael Shawn Robinson
- Producer: Myke Diesel

Mike Jones singles chronology
"Badd" (2005)	"Mr. Jones" (2006)	"My 64" (2007)

"Mr. Jones" is a song by American hip hop recording artist Mike Jones, released as the first single from his EP The American Dream. At the end of the song, Mike Jones claims that there is a film called The American Dream coming out as well as the EP. The single debuted at 92 on the Billboard Hot 100, but the following week it fell off the chart.

== Music video ==
The video for "Mr. Jones" premiered on February 15, 2007 on BET's 106 and Park. Bun B, Lil' Flip, DJ Drama, Letoya Luckett, Slim Thug, and King Mello, all make cameo appearances.

== Remix ==
Rapper Lil Wayne used the music from this song, replacing Jones' lyrics with his own, and released the mix as "The Sky Is The Limit" on his 2007 mixtape Da Drought 3.

== Formats and track listing ==
US 12"

1. "Mr. Jones" (Super Clean Radio Edit) – 4:02
2. "Mr. Jones" (Radio Edit) – 4:03
3. "Mr. Jones" (Instrumental) – 4:03
4. "Mr. Jones" (Album Version) – 4:03
5. "Mr. Jones" (A Cappella, Radio) – 3:56
6. "Mr. Jones" (A Cappella, Album) – 3:53

US CD

1. "Mr. Jones" (Super Clean Radio Edit) – 4:02
2. "Mr. Jones" (Radio Edit) – 4:03
3. "Mr. Jones" (Instrumental) – 4:03
4. "Mr. Jones" (Album Version) – 4:03
5. "Mr. Jones" (A Cappella) (Radio) – 3:56
6. "Mr. Jones" (A Cappella) (Album) – 3:53

== Charts ==
Chart (2006)	Peak position
US Billboard Hot 100	92
US Hot R&B/Hip-Hop Songs (Billboard)	54
US Pop 100 (Billboard)	85
