= Next to You (Mike Jones song) =

Single by Mike Jones featuring Nae Nae

from the album The Voice and The American Dream (Target Bonus Track)
- Released: December 2, 2008
- Recorded: 2006–2007
- Genre: Trap, pop rap
- Length: 3:41
- Label: Cuddy/Ice Age Entertainment/Warner Bros.
- Songwriters: Erick Todd Coomes, Marty James, Garton, Mike Jones, J.R. Rotem
- Producer: J.R. Rotem

Mike Jones singles chronology
"Cuddy Buddy" (2008)	"Next to You" (2008)	"Swagg Thru the Roof" (2009)

"Next to You" is the third single from Houston rapper Mike Jones second studio album, The Voice. It was produced by J.R. Rotem and features uncredited background vocals from R&B singer Nae Nae.

It was first released on Mike Jones' MySpace profile, and was then released on Amazon and iTunes on December 2, 2008.

== Music video ==
Mr. Boomtown directed the music video for the song. The girl in the song is often confused with American-singer/actress Ashanti, however it is not. Mike Jones had stated that it is a singer signed to his label and her name is Nae Nae. He also said she is in the music video to show the fans that it is not Ashanti.

== Charts ==
Chart (2008–2009)	Peak position
US Billboard Hot 100	71
US Hot R&B/Hip-Hop Songs (Billboard)	47
US Hot Rap Songs (Billboard)	8
US Pop 100 (Billboard)	65
US Rhythmic Airplay (Billboard)	11

== Certifications ==
Region	Certification	Certified units/sales
New Zealand (RMNZ)	Platinum	15,000^{‡}
^{‡} Sales+streaming figures based on certification alone.

== Release history ==
Release dates and formats for "Next to You"
Region	Date	Format	Label(s)	Ref.
United States	March 10, 2009	Mainstream airplay	Warner Bros.	
