= Still Tippin' =

Single by Mike Jones featuring Slim Thug & Paul Wall

from the album Who Is Mike Jones?, The Day Hell Broke Loose 2, and The American Dream
- Released: November 12, 2004
- Recorded: 2003
- Genre: Hip hop
- Length: 4:32 (explicit version); 3:34 (radio edit)
- Label: Asylum; Swishahouse; Warner Bros.
- Songwriters: Michael Jones; Paul Slayton; Stayve Thomas; Salih Williams
- Producer: Salih Williams

Mike Jones singles chronology
| "Still Tippin'" (2004) | "Back Then" (2005) |

Slim Thug singles chronology
| "Like a Boss" (2004) | "Still Tippin'" (2004) | "3 Kings" (2005) |

Paul Wall singles chronology
| "Still Tippin'" (2004) | "Sittin' Sidewayz" (2005) |

Audio
- "Still Tippin'" on YouTube
- "Still Tippin'" (radio edit) on YouTube

Music video
- "Still Tippin' (featuring Mike Jones, Slim Thug & Paul Wall)" on YouTube

"Still Tippin" is the debut single by American rapper Mike Jones, released on November 12, 2004 as his debut and lead single from his album Who Is Mike Jones? (2005). Prior to this, it was also used as a single to promote Swisha House's compilation album, The Day Hell Broke Loose 2 (2003). The song features vocals from rappers Slim Thug and Paul Wall, the latter in his first single appearance.

The beat was produced by Salih Williams, featuring a hypnotic refrain from a Swishahouse song of Slim Thug from years past. In an interview with MTV, Jones stated that the "tippin'" of the title is a synonym for "cruising" (i.e. driving). He also added that "tippin' on four 4s, wrapped in four Vogues" refers to rims with "the spokes that you see sticking out" wrapped in Vogue tires, which he explains "were made in 1994 by Cadillac and those were the most popular ones at the time". Furthermore, the line is a reference to the slang for the Acres Homes area of Houston, Texas where the "fo-fo" comes from the Metro bus route number 44 which goes through the community.

The song's music video was directed by John "Dr. Teeth" Tucker, earning him an MTV Video Music Award nomination. The last verse was given to rapper Paul Wall after fellow artist Chamillionaire had a dispute with both Paul Wall and Mike Jones, resulting in Chamillionaire's departure from Swishahouse.

== Song versions ==
=== Original version ===
The version of "Still Tippin'" released on Mike Jones's album (which contains a string piece sample taken from a 1990 recording of Gioachino Rossini's "William Tell Overture" by the South German Philharmonic Orchestra and Alfred Scholz) is actually a remix of the original version featuring Slim Thug, Chamillionaire and Mike Jones. When Chamillionaire and Mike Jones started their rivalry, Jones took the track, placed it on a different beat and cut Chamillionaire off it. He then got Paul Wall to record a verse and used it as a substitute for the cut verse. The original version of the song is sampled from Slim Thug's own song "I'm a Hoe (Freestyle)" (from his 1998 album I Represent This), and can be heard on the Rap-a-Lot Records compilation, The Day After Hell Broke Loose.

=== Other versions ===
According to CD Now, the song was released in 2003 on Swishahouse's The Day Hell Broke Loose 2 AKA Major Without A Major Deal album, but due to word of mouth, and the infamous X-rated version seen on BET: Uncut released in spring of the following year, by late 2004 the song received major radio rotations, and an edited version of the video was released. The official remix known as the "Underground Remix" features Screwed Up Click members Lil' Keke & Big Pokey. A remix of the song, called "Bitch What U Know About", features 50 Cent, Young Buck and Spider Loc. A freestyle by Ludacris is included on the mixtape The Preview called "Still Spittin'". Another official remix titled, "Still Tippin (It's a Man's World Remix)", featuring singer Nicole Wray can be found on the soundtrack of the movie, Hustle & Flow. The beat for the song "Still Tippin", was also used on Lupe Fiasco's mixtape in a song called "Switch". It is one of Lupe's most popular mixtape songs, garnering millions of views on YouTube.

== Charts ==
=== Weekly charts ===
| Chart (2005) | Peak position |
|---|---|
| US Billboard Hot 100 | 60 |
| US Hot R&B/Hip-Hop Songs (Billboard) | 26 |
| US Hot Rap Songs (Billboard) | 14 |
| US Pop 100 (Billboard) | 62 |
| US Rhythmic Airplay (Billboard) | 40 |

=== Year-end charts ===
| Charts (2005) | Position |
|---|---|
| US Hot R&B/Hip-Hop Songs (Billboard) | 93 |

== Certifications ==
| Region | Certification | Certified units/sales |
|---|---|---|
| United States (RIAA) | 2× Platinum | 2,000,000^{‡} |
^{‡} Sales+streaming figures based on certification alone.
