= Brooke Valentine =

American singer

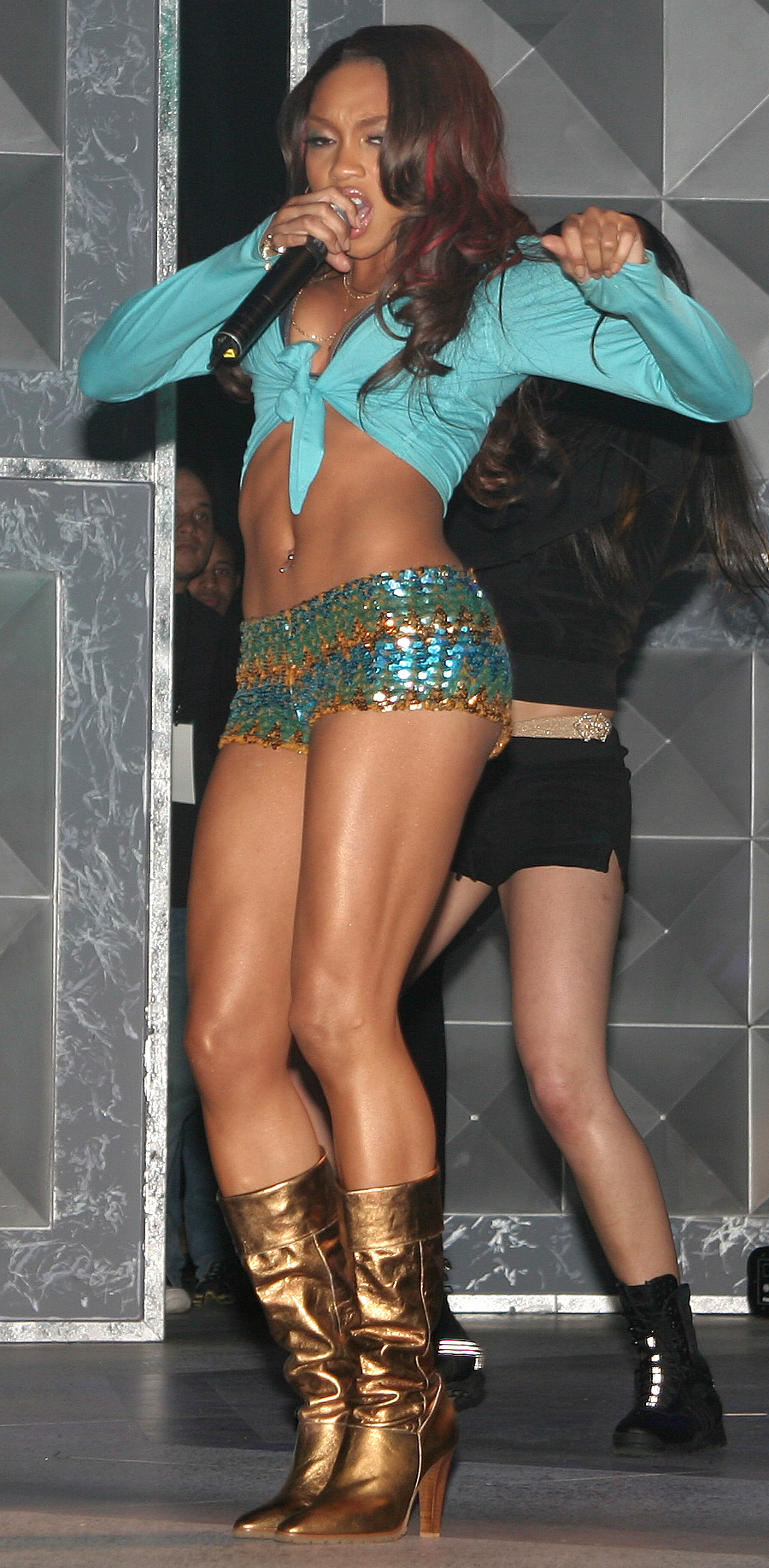
- Valentine performing in 2005

Background information
- Born: October 5, 1982 (age 44)
- Origin: Houston, Texas, U.S.
- Genres: R&B; hip hop; crunk; snap
- Occupations: Singer; songwriter; dancer; actress; model
- Years active: 2004–present
- Labels: Subliminal; Virgin; Capitol; Columbia
- Spouse: Marcus Black (m. 2019)

Kanesha Nichole Brookes-Moody (born October 5, 1982), better known by her stage name Brooke Valentine, is an American actress, model, singer, songwriter, and television personality. Her single "Girlfight" peaked on U.S. music charts in 2005, paving the way for her debut album Chain Letter released via Subliminal Entertainment imprint on Virgin Records and went on to sell more than 290,000 units worldwide. After a first attempt at a comeback, Brooke officially returned to the spotlight in 2012 with two singles "Forever" and the Adult R&B Top 40 hit "Don't Wanna Be In Love".

== Biography ==
=== 1982–2004: Early life and career beginnings ===
Valentine was born in Houston. She started her career as a member of the female group Best Kept Secret. To pursue a solo career, she moved to Los Angeles with producer and Subliminal Entertainment CEO Deja the Great and signed to Virgin Records.

=== 2004–2006: Chain Letter ===
Brooke Valentine made her debut with the hit single, "Girlfight", which featured Lil Jon and Big Boi, which peaked at #23 on the Billboard Hot 100 and #13 on the R&B chart. It succeeded internationally, peaking in the Top 50 in Australia and Ireland, and Top 40 in New Zealand and the United Kingdom. Rolling Stone later included it on their list of "The 50 Best One-Hit Wonders of the 2000s".

In 2005, she released her debut album Chain Letter which debuted at #16 on the US Billboard 200 and #3 on the U.S. Billboard Top R&B/Hip Hop Albums charts. A follow-up single "Long as You Come Home" peaked at #71 on the US R&B/Hip-Hop chart, while a third (the ballad "Covergirl") was released digitally but not sent to radio.

Later that year, collaborated with rappers Fabolous and Yo-Yo on the single "Boogie Oogie Oogie" for the Roll Bounce soundtrack.

=== 2006–2009: Physical Education ===
In 2006, Valentine set work on her second studio album, Physical Education. She released the set's lead single "D-Girl" featuring Pimp C that year, peaking at #92 on the Billboard R&B/Hip Hop Singles chart. A follow-up single "Pimped Out" featuring Dem Franchize Boyz was released but failed to catch on.

Eventually, the Physical Education project was put on hold due to Virgin Records' merger with Capitol Records in 2008. Subliminal Entertainment CEO Deja the Great then acquired the masters and the contract rights from Virgin Records, and material from the project was released independently on the Physical Education Mixtape in 2009.

She later said in an interview that the project was a "paper album" with Virgin, as it was a forced effort due to her being on the label's timeline for a new release and being set up with all the "hot" producers at the time. In addition to not turning in the complete album to the label, Valentine was also dealing with the death of her cousin during the "D-Girl" single release, all of which added to the album not being initially released.

=== 2010–2013: Forever / Love Letters EP ===
In a 2010 interview, Valentine said that she took a break and has been writing music for other artists, and was working on new material.

That year, she also gave birth to her first child, a son. In 2012, she did an interview with Essence magazine discussing her son's cerebral palsy diagnosis. She also penned an open letter to him with Ebony magazine, calling him her "tiny hero".

Adding to her stage name the alias B. Valentine, she released a music video for the song "Insanity" in December 2011, shot entirely on an Apple iPad and directed by Subliminal CEO Deja the Great. She announced a new album titled Forever set for release later in the year, led by a new single "Forever" which premiered on February 14, 2012. "Rub It In" (a collaboration with Tyrese) was announced as the set's second single and released as a digital single, but the album was later pushed back in lieu of a new project.

In 2013, she released a new EP titled Love Letters which garnered a positive response. A single from the set, "Don't Wanna Be In Love" was released and peaked at number 29 on the Billboard Adult R&B chart, marking her first chart appearance in six years.

=== 2014–present: New projects and Love & Hip-Hop ===
In 2014, she filmed scenes for the L.A.-spin off cast of VH1's hit reality series Love & Hip Hop, but ultimately did not make the cut. Since then, she's been working on her second studio album.

In 2016, she released a series of new digital singles, with "Grow Up" on April 29, "#CRAIG" (produced by Yonni) on July 2, and "Games" on October 5.

In June 2017, it was confirmed she will appear on the new season of VH1's popular series Love & Hip Hop: Hollywood alongside newcomers Keyshia Cole and Chanel West Coast. She was promoted to a series regular on season five. In March 2021, Valentine became an ambassador for Savage x Fenty.

== Personal life ==
She married rapper Marcus Black in 2019, and she has three children. On July 25, 2026, Valentine announced that they are expecting twins.

== Discography ==
Studio albums

- Chain Letter (2005)

EPs

- Sip (2018)

Mixtapes

- Physical Education Mixtape Album (2009)
- Love Letters (2013)

== Filmography ==
Television roles
Year	Title	Role	Notes
2005	MTV Cribs	Herself	Episode: "May 31, 2005"
2005	All Shades of Fine: 25 Hottest Women of the Past 25 Years	Herself	TV movie
2017–2018	Love & Hip Hop: Hollywood	Herself	Supporting role (season 4); Main role (seasons 5)
2021	Love & Hip Hop: It's a Love Thing	Herself	Television special
2021-2022	Family Reunion: Love & Hip Hop Edition	Herself	Main role
2023	VH1 Black History Month with Santwon, Jaida Essence Hall, & Brooke Valentine	Herself	Television special
2024-present	Love & Hip Hop: Miami	Herself	Supporting role (season 5-present)
