= Back Then =

Single by Mike Jones

from the album Who Is Mike Jones? and The American Dream
- Released: February 15, 2005
- Recorded: 2004
- Genre: Hip hop
- Length: 4:05
- Label: Swishahouse; Warner Bros.; Asylum
- Songwriters: Mike Jones; Salih Williams
- Producer: Salih Williams

Mike Jones singles chronology
"Still Tippin'" (2004)	"Back Then" (2005)	"Flossin'" (2005)

Music video
- "Back Then" on YouTube

"Back Then" is a song by American rapper Mike Jones, released in February 15, 2005 as the second single from his debut studio album Who Is Mike Jones?. Peaking at number 22 on the Billboard Hot 100, the single gave him his first and only top 40 hit on that chart as a solo artist, as well as success on the Hot Rap Songs and Hot R&B/Hip-Hop Songs charts at numbers 6 and 15 respectively. A music video directed by Dr. Teeth was made for the single.

== Song information ==
The song deals with the popularity and sexual attention rappers receive because of their money, contrasts, and the way Jones was treated before achieving success. The song is sometimes seen as a critique of effects of fame or hypergamy; conversely, it is often considered to present a misogynistic or chauvinistic attitude toward women. The following line, which is repeated many times during the song, sums up the general attitude of the lyrics: "Back then hoes didn't want me / Now I'm hot hoes all on me." The song talks about Jones' life before fame, getting constant rejection from women he wanted to get attention from and giving them the same treatment now that he's a successful rapper.

The song is featured in the 2007 Xbox 360 video game Def Jam: Icon. Mike Jones is a playable character in the video game and provides his own voice and likeness.

== Commercial performance ==
The single became Jones' most successful single to date, peaking at number 22 on the Billboard Hot 100. The single became a success on both the Hot Rap Songs and Hot R&B/Hip-Hop Songs charts where it peaked at #6 and 15 respectively, while becoming a moderate hit on the Pop 100 chart where it peaked at number 45. The song was also a moderate success on the Hot Digital Songs chart, where it peaked at number 26 and eventually went Platinum, becoming Jones' second platinum single.

== Music video ==
Directed by Dr. Teeth (who directed most of Mike Jones' videos), the video looks at Mike Jones's life before he was famous, getting shut down by every woman he met and tried to get attention from, and how he reacts to those same women who passed him up only for them to be given the same treatment they gave to him. The video is bookended with a club concert that has fans saying his catchphrase, "Who? Mike Jones!" Ali Siddiq and DJ Michael "5000" Watts makes cameo appearances.

== Track listing ==
UK 12"

1. "Back Then" (Radio Version) – 4:05
2. "Back Then" (Instrumental) – 4:05
3. "Back Then" (Album Version) – 4:04

US 12"

1. "Back Then" (Radio Version) – 4:05
2. "Back Then" (Instrumental) – 4:05
3. "Back Then" (Album Version) – 4:04

== Charts ==
=== Weekly charts ===
Chart (2005)	Peak position
US Billboard Hot 100	22
US Hot R&B/Hip-Hop Songs (Billboard)	15
US Hot Rap Songs (Billboard)	6
US Pop 100 (Billboard)	45
US Rhythmic Airplay (Billboard)	11

=== Year-end charts ===
Chart (2005)	Position
US Billboard Hot 100	92
US Hot R&B/Hip-Hop Songs (Billboard)	75

== Certifications ==
Region	Certification	Certified units/sales
United States (RIAA)	Platinum	1,000,000^{^}
^{^} Shipments figures based on certification alone.
