= Chain Letter (album) =

Studio album by Brooke Valentine
- Released: March 15, 2005
- Recorded: 2004
- Genre: R&B
- Length: 55:16
- Labels: Subliminal; Virgin; Capitol
- Producers: Bink!; Bloodshy & Avant; Déjà "The Great"; Josh Deutsch; Heatmakerz; Jermaine Dupri; Brandon Howard; Lil Jon; Matt Serletic; Soul Diggaz

Singles from Chain Letter
- 1. "Girlfight" Released: January 4, 2005; 2. "Long as You Come Home" Released: July 5, 2005

Chain Letter is the only studio album by American singer Brooke Valentine, released on March 15, 2005, by Subliminal Entertainment, Virgin Records and Capitol Records. Work on the album began after Valentine left the female group Best Kept Secret, in order to pursue a solo career. She moved to Los Angeles, California with producer and Subliminal Entertainment CEO Deja the Great to begin work on the album. Valentine enlisted a variety of producers to work on the album including Bink!, Bloodshy & Avant, Déjà "The Great", Jermaine Dupri, Brandon Howard, Lil Jon and Matt Serletic among others.

Musically it is an R&B album, that blends diverse musical genres such as hip hop, crunk, dance-pop, reggae-funk, folk, baroque pop and jungle music. Upon release, the album was met with critical acclaim from music critics who praised the album's production, with other critics comparing the album to the work of film producer Steven Soderbergh. Commercially the album fared well and peaked at 16 on the US Billboard 200 and three on the US Top R&B/Hip-Hop Albums chart.

The album was preceded by the release of the lead single "Girlfight", that features Big Boi from the band Outkast, and Lil Jon. "Girlfight" was a commercial success peaking at twenty-three on the Billboard Hot 100 as well as making appearances on charts in Ireland, New Zealand, Australia and the UK. The second single released from the album was "Long As You Come Home", which reached number 71 on the Billboard R&B/Hip-Hop Songs chart where it spent 5 weeks. The third single was "Cover Girl", however the song failed to chart.

== Background ==
Valentine started her musical career as a member of the female group Best Kept Secret. To pursue a solo career, she moved to Los Angeles, California with producer and Subliminal Entertainment CEO Deja the Great and signed to Virgin Records. Her first album for Virgin, Chain Letter, was written and recorded over a span of four months. Around 200 songs were recorded.

== Music and lyrics ==
According to Matt Cibula from PopMatters, Chain Letter is a record "full of true strangeness and cutting-edge pop music in a number of different genres". Billboard noted that Valentine "careens from crunk to R&B/pop to alternative/rock". In another article the publication reiterated that the "album leaps among genres ranging from pop, rock and alternative to dance, hip-hop and R&B". Valentine discussed the musical diversity of the album saying, "I love all types of music, she continued, I have fun dibbing and dabbing in all genres."

The opening track and lead single, "Girlfight" is a crunk song with a synth beat "buried under some acid-rock guitar". It features guest appearances from Lil Jon and Big Boi; lyrically it "steps into the uncharted territory of how girls physically challenge each other". Described as an "Hyperactive club banger", "Taste of Dis" is a dance-pop track that was compared to the work of Destiny's Child. "Long as You Come Home", has a "pillowy R&B groove", while "Blah-Blah-Blah" featuring Ol' Dirty Bastard is an "organ-fueled" reggae-funk song. The latter "turns Valentine into a naughty girl who still loves her thug boyfriend". The "somber", "Cover Girl" is an acoustic guitar driven folk song that features churchy organ swells. On the record Valentine is "lamenting that she just has to put on a lot of makeup to get noticed by a neglectful guy: “I know I’m not Halle Berry / Girls from videos / I just wanna be / Someone you can hold".

"Million Bucks" is another dance-pop song in the style of Destiny's Child, while "I Want You Dead" is a "baroque pop gem". Lyrically, "I Want You Dead", is a "demented revenge fantasy", in which "Valentine details all the ways she will ruin the life of her ex-dude, including poking holes in his prophylactics, getting him fired, and selling his stuff on eBay while he is getting eaten by maggots in his coffin." "Laugh Til I Cry", is an R&B song that is an "haunting and ambiguous take on domestic violence". On the "funky" "American Girl" Valentine "shakes her Texan tail feather over a jungle beat". Bonus track "Thrill of the Chase" "uses a great Hendrix riff to underscore her rant against her boyfriend for demanding that she commit to him: “I’m really feeling you but you don’t understand / I’m not sure if I can settle down with just one man." "Thrill of the Chase" appeared on the initial tracklist as a regular album track, but was later replaced with "Playa" ahead of the album's release.

== Promotion ==
"Girlfight", which features Lil Jon and Big Boi, was selected as the album's lead single and first released on January 4, 2005. It succeeded internationally, peaking in the top fifty in Australia and Ireland, and the top 40 in New Zealand and the United Kingdom. Second single, "Long as You Come Home" was released on July 5, 2005. It peaked at number 71 on the US US R&B/Hip-Hop chart. "Cover Girl" was released as a promotional single on October 18, 2005. It failed to chart. "Laugh Til I Cry" was also released as a promotional single to radio, but it failed to chart as well.

== Critical reception ==
Professional ratings
Review scores
Source	Rating
AllMusic	4/5 stars
Artistdirect	2.5/5 stars
Blender	3/5 stars
Entertainment Weekly	B+
PopMatters	9/10
Rolling Stone	2/5 stars

Upon release Chain Letter was met with critical acclaim from music critics. AllMusic editor Andy Kellman gave a positive review to album, giving it four out of five stars. He praised the album's production continuing to say "A debut that fulfills and promises at the same time, Chain Letter contains 40 faultless minutes of club tracks and a few minutes of seductive balladry. That's not bad for someone who put it all to bed before hitting the age of 20." PopMatters editor Matt Cibula wrote: "At any rate, the only potential flaw with this record is if Brooke Valentine goes on to make a lot more records that are even better, thereby making this one look weak by comparison. As it is, it’s brave and scary and hilarious and awesome and I love it like it’s the new girl in junior high school."

Entertainment Weekly critic Yancey Strickler gave acclaim to the album comparing it to play like Steven Soderbergh's filmography, saying "There's a little popcorn for the cineplex and some chewier fare for the art houses. But Valentine's eccentricities, unlike Soderbergh's, actually improve her chances for stardom." Christian Hoard from Rolling Stone found that Chain Letter was "less compelling" apart from lead single "Girlfight." He wrote: "Underwritten dance pop such as "Taste of Dis" and "Million Bucks" comes off like a murkier Destiny's Child. Valentine sounds at ease on pillowy R&B grooves like "Laugh Til I Cry" and "Long as You Come Home." But whether she's telling her man she wants him dead or fielding jealous come-ons from the late O.D.B. on "Blah Blah Blah," her airy voice and unconvincing posturing leave her a few steps short of R&B diva status." Kelefa Sanneh, writing for The New York Times, remarked: "Somehow, it all sounds more dull than delicious. (If she's a great singer, she hides it well.) But while Ms. Valentine isn't the second coming of Ciara, there's still plenty to like about Chain Letter, a cheerful, garish mess of a debut album."

== Commercial performance ==
Chain Letter debuted and peaked at number 16 on the US Billboard 200 and number three on the Top R&B/Hip-Hop Albums chart, with first week sales of 42,000 copies. The album sold 290,000 copies in the US.

== Track listing ==
Chain Letter track listing
No.	Title	Writer(s)	Producer(s)	Length
1.	"Girlfight" (featuring Lil Jon & Big Boi)	Antwan Patton; Brooke Valentine; Christopher Stewart; Derik Johnson; Jonathan Smith; Penelope Magnet	Lil Jon; Deja (The Great)^{[a]}	3:54
2.	"Taste of Dis"	Brandon Howard; Valentine; Corte Ellis; Johnson; Karriem Mack; Shaun Owens	B. Howard; Soul Diggaz; Deja (The Great)^{[b]}	4:21
3.	"Long As You Come Home"	Valentine; Johnson; Kevin Spencer; Richard Randolph; Rickey Smith; Walter Millsap III	Solomon; Deja (The Great)^{[c]}	3:25
4.	"Blah-Blah-Blah" (featuring Ol' Dirty Bastard)	Valentine; Christian Karlsson; Johnson; Henrik Jonback; Pontus Winnberg	Bloodshy & Avant	3:32
5.	"Cover Girl"	Howard; Valentine; Ellis; Johnson; Mack; Owens	B. Howard; Soul Diggaz; Deja (The Great)^{[b]}	4:12
6.	"Playa" (featuring Jermaine Dupri)	Valentine; Johnson; James Phillips; Dupri; Johnta Austin	Dupri; LRoc; Deja (The Great)^{[a]}	3:23
7.	"Ghetto Superstarz"	Valentine; Johnson; Magnet; Roosevelt Harrell III; Terius Nash	Bink!; Deja (The Great)^{[c]}	3:33
8.	"Tell Me Why? (You Don't Love Me)"	Valentine; Johnson; Harrell	Bink!; Deja (The Great)^{[c]}	2:59
9.	"Million Bucks" (featuring Queenz Deliz)	Bill Elliott; Bob Purvis; Valentine; Johnson; Gary Wright; Gregory Green; Sean Thomas; Tina Wright	Heatmakerz; Deja (The Great)^{[a]}	3:31
10.	"I Want You Dead"	Johnson	Deja (The Great)	3:49
11.	"Dying from a Broken Heart"	Valentine; Johnson	Deja (The Great)	3:52
12.	"Pass Us By"	Valentine; Johnson	Deja (The Great)	3:50
13.	"Laugh Til I Cry"	Valentine; Johnson	Deja (The Great)	4:55
14.	"American Girl"	Valentine; Johnson; Karlsson; Dino Fekaris; Felix Howard; Freddie Perren; Jonback; Winnberg	Bloodshy & Avant	3:38
15.	"Whatcha Lookin At" (featuring Kilo)	Valentine; Johnson	Deja (The Great)	2:25
Total length:				55:16

Japanese bonus track
No.	Title	Writer(s)	Producer(s)	Length
16.	"Girlfight" (Remix featuring Lil Jon, Da Brat, Remy Ma, and Miss B)	Valentine; Stewart; Johnson; Smith; Magnet	Lil Jon; Deja (The Great)^{[a]}	3:07
17.	"Thrill of the Chase"	Valentine; Johnson; Karlsson; F. Howard; Jonback; Winnberg	Bloodshy & Avant	3:20

Notes

- ^{^a} denotes vocal producer
- ^{^b} denotes additional producer
- ^{^c} denotes co-producer

Sample credits

- "Long As You Come Home" samples "Adventures in the Land of Music" by Dynasty.
- "Million Bucks" samples "I'm Alive" by Spooky Tooth.
- "American Girl" samples "Shake Your Groove Thing" by Peaches & Herb.

== Charts ==
=== Weekly charts ===
Weekly chart performance for Chain Letter
Chart (2005)	Peak position
US Billboard 200	16
US Top R&B/Hip-Hop Albums (Billboard)	3

=== Year-end charts ===
Year-end chart performance for Chain Letter
Chart (2005)	Position
US Top R&B/Hip-Hop Albums (Billboard)	80
