= D-Girl (DopeGirl) =

Single by Brooke Valentine featuring Pimp C
- Released: May 16, 2006 (iTunes)
- Recorded: 2005–06
- Genre: R&B
- Length: 3:59 (Clean version); 4:21 (Explicit version)
- Label: Virgin
- Songwriters: B. Valentine; D. Johnsson; C. Butler; A. Young; O. Jackson
- Producer: Deja "The Great"

Brooke Valentine singles chronology
"Boogie Oogie Oogie" (2005)	"D-Girl" (2006)	"Pimped Out" (2006)

Pimp C singles chronology
"Pourin' Up" (2006)	"D-Girl" (2006)	"Love Song" (2006)

"D-Girl" ("Dope Girl") is a song by the American R&B singer Brooke Valentine. It features late rapper Pimp C. The song was released on May 16, 2006 to iTunes as the first single for Valentine's second studio album, Physical Education. However, after numerous delays, it was announced in 2007 that the album had been shelved.

== Music video ==
The music video premiered on June 15, 2006 on BET's 106 & Park as "the new joint of the day". Also, the video was the highest debuting video of the week at Yahoo!'s Launch. The video debuted at #35 and is #6 in the R&B genre.

== Charts ==
Chart (2006)	Peak position
Netherlands Urban (MegaCharts)	69
Billboard Hot R&B/Hip-Hop Songs	92
Billboard Hot R&B/Hip-Hop Singles Sales	48

== Track listings ==
12" maxi single

Side A

1. "D-Girl (Dopegirl)" (Clean) - 3:59
2. "D-Girl (Dopegirl)" (Radio Edit) - 4:01
3. "D-Girl (Dopegirl)" (Instrumental) - 4:21
4. "D-Girl (Dopegirl)" (Album Version - Explicit) - 4:21

Side B

1. "D-Girl (Dopegirl)" (Clean) - 3:59
2. "D-Girl (Dopegirl)" (Radio Edit) - 4:01
3. "D-Girl (Dopegirl)" (Instrumental) - 4:21
4. "D-Girl (Dopegirl)" (Album Version - Explicit) - 4:21

CD maxi single

1. "D-Girl (Dopegirl)" (Clean) - 3:59
2. "D-Girl (Dopegirl)" (Radio Edit) - 4:01
3. "D-Girl (Dopegirl)" (Instrumental) - 4:21
4. "D-Girl (Dopegirl)" (Album Version - Explicit) - 4:21

== Personnel ==
- Vocal arrangements: Deja "The Great" and Brooke Valentine.
- Engineered by: Ari "J-Mobb" Levine at Subliminal Studios, Los Angeles.
- Mixed by: Dave "D-Lo" Lopez at Ameraycan Studios, North Hollywood.
- Background vocals: Brooke Valentine.
- Additional vocals: Deja "The Great".
- Elements composed by: "The Great".
- Additional keys: Brian Kennedy.
