= Long as You Come Home =

Single by Brooke Valentine

from the album Chain Letter
- Released: July 5, 2005
- Genre: R&B; hip hop
- Length: 3:32
- Label: Virgin
- Songwriters: B. Valentine; D. Johnson; Walter Millsap III; R. Smith; R. Randolph; K. Spencer
- Producer: Deja the Great

Brooke Valentine singles chronology
"Girlfight" (2005)	"Long as You Come Home" (2005)	"Cover Girl" (2005)

"Long as You Come Home" is the second single from American R&B singer Brooke Valentine's debut album Chain Letter. It was released on July 5, 2005. The song samples Dynasty's 1980 song "Adventures in the Land of Music", the same sample that was used in Camp Lo's 1997 hit "Luchini AKA This Is It".

== Remixes ==
The song has many official remixes released in promo CD singles, promo vinyl singles, & digital downloads.

The first official remix, the "Southern Invasion Remix", features Houston rappers Paul Wall and Mike Jones. There is an alternate version of the remix called the "Southern Invasion 3 Kings & A Queen Remix" and it also features Paul Wall, Mike Jones, & an additional verse by rapper Kilo aka J.R.K.. There is also a chopped and screwed version to the "Southern Invasion 3 Kings & A Queen Remix", Paul Wall, Mike Jones, & Kilo aka J.R.K.'s verses were chopped and screwed while Valentine's vocals & the instrumental stayed the same.

The second official remix features Dipset rapper Juelz Santana.

The third official remix features rapper & Virgin labelmate Bossman.

== Formats and track listings ==
CD maxi single

1. "Long As You Come Home" (Album Version) - 3:25
2. "Long As You Come Home" (Southern Invasion Remix Radio Edit) - 4:02
3. "Long As You Come Home" (Southern Invasion 3 Kings And A Queen Remix) - 4:28
4. "Long As You Come Home" (Southern Invasion 3 Kings And A Queen Screwed Remix) - 4:28
5. "Long As You Come Home" (Southern Invasion Instrumental) - 4:28

CD single

1. "Long As You Come Home" (Juelz Santana Mix Clean) - 3:55
2. "Long As You Come Home" (Album Version Clean) - 3:25
3. "Long As You Come Home" (Bossman Mix Clean) - 3:50
4. "Long As You Come Home" (Instrumental) - 3:25

CD single

1. "Long As You Come Home" (Juelz Santana Mix Clean) - 3:55
2. "Long As You Come Home" (Album Version Clean) - 3:25
3. "Long As You Come Home" (Bossman Mix Clean) - 3:50
4. "Long As You Come Home" (Instrumental) - 3:25

12-inch vinyl

Side A

1. "Long As You Come Home" (Juelz Santana Mix) - 3:55
2. "Long As You Come Home" (Album Version) - 3:25

Side B

1. "Long As You Come Home" (Bossman Mix) - 3:50
2. "Long As You Come Home" (Instrumental) - 3:25

CDr single

1. "Long As You Come Home" (Southern Invasion Remix Radio Edit)

== Chart performance ==
With very little promotion, the song reached number 71 on the Billboard R&B/Hip-Hop Songs chart where it spent 5 weeks.

== Charts ==
Chart (2005)	Peak Position
U.S. Billboard Hot R&B/Hip-Hop Songs	71
