= Mike Jones (rapper) =

American rapper (born 1981)

- Also known as: Sache
- Born: Michael Allen Jones; November 18, 1981 (age 44); Houston, Texas, U.S.
- Genre: Southern hip-hop
- Occupations: Rapper; songwriter
- Years active: 1999–present
- Labels: Asylum; Warner Bros.; Ice Age; Swishahouse

Michael Allen Jones (born November 18, 1981) is an American rapper. Born and raised in Houston, he signed with the local record label Swishahouse in the early 2000s, and rose to mainstream recognition with his 2004 single, "Still Tippin'" (featuring Slim Thug and Paul Wall). The song entered the Billboard Hot 100 and was followed by his 2005 single, "Back Then", which peaked at number 22 on the chart. Both songs received platinum certifications by the Recording Industry Association of America (RIAA) and preceded the release of his debut studio album, Who Is Mike Jones? (2005), which peaked at number three on the Billboard 200. That same year, Jones guest appeared on T-Pain's 2005 single "I'm 'n Luv (wit a Stripper)", which peaked at number five on the Billboard Hot 100.

His second album, The Voice (2009), was further commercially oriented. Despite a critical decline, two of its singles, "Next to You" and "Cuddy Buddy" (featuring Trey Songz, Lil Wayne and Twista), entered the Billboard Hot 100. Jones's career is loosely trademarked by his catchphrase "Who? Mike Jones!" (or "who is Mike Jones?"), which he usually repeated several times on songs, as well as handing out shirts with his cell phone number printed on the back.

== Early life ==
Jones originally wanted to be an NBA player who rapped on the side. He transferred from school to school many times, forcing him to play only in YMCA leagues due to transfer rules after the ninth grade. Jones dropped out of high school and briefly took jobs at fast food restaurants. He worked at a Compaq plant and sold cell phones from an apartment on Antoine Drive. T. Brown, Jones's partner in several financial ventures, said that he sold "dime bags" for six months.

== Career ==
=== Early career ===
Jones began his musical career in 1999 in a group called Souf Folk, using the alias Sache. He released one album with Souf Folk, Country Thuggin. In 2001, Jones formed his own independent record label, Ice Age Entertainment, and began a solo career. He independently promoted and distributed his music on the streets and pressed it on DJs at strip clubs.

Jones eventually signed with then-upcoming Southern hip hop label Swishahouse, after meeting with its then-A&R T. Farris. At that time, Swishahouse was signing fellow Texas-based rappers Slim Thug, Paul Wall and Chamillionaire. Farris recalled signing Jones, saying, "I heard him on one of my partner’s mixtapes and I wanted to meet him and try to get him to rap on our mixtapes. We linked up, signed him." DJ Casual from Meridian, Mississippi was the first person to play Jones on the radio. He loved what Jones was doing and passed it on to several fellow DJs.

=== 2004–2007: Who Is Mike Jones? and The American Dream EP ===
In 2004 after the release of his breakout single "Still Tippin'", which was receiving much radio play, Jones signed a major deal with Jive Records and Warner Bros. He quickly released his second single, "Back Then", which went Platinum, making it Jones's first Platinum single. On April 19, 2005, Jones released his debut album, Who Is Mike Jones? After two months the album also achieved Platinum status. It is Jones's best-selling album to date.

After leaving Jive Records Jones signed a distribution deal with Asylum Records for his label Ice Age. In September 2006 Jones released the single "Mr. Jones". It debuted at No. 92 on the Billboard Charts. The song gained further recognition when Lil Wayne freestyled on his version "Sky Is The Limit" for his "Da Drought 3" mixtape. On January 31, 2007, Jones announced an upcoming EP and a movie, both titled The American Dream. On April 21, he released the second single from the EP, "My 64", featuring Bun B and Snoop Dogg. The single debuted at No. 1 on the Bubbling Under Hot 100 Singles chart. On November 20, Jones released The American Dream. It debuted on the Billboard charts at No. 183.

=== 2008–2009: The Voice ===
On November 27, 2007, Jones released the debut single "Drop & Gimme 50" for his second solo album, The Voice. "Drop & Gimme 50" featured Hurricane Chris. On May 19, 2008, Jones released the album's second single, "Cuddy Buddy". The single did well on the Billboard Hot 100, debuting at No. 78. On December 2, 2008, the third single from The Voice was released. Titled "Next To You", it debuted on the Billboard Hot 100 at No. 63. On April 28, 2009, The Voice was released, debuting on the Billboard 200 at No. 12 and selling 25,000 copies its first week.

=== 2012–2020: Hiatus, unreleased Where Is Mike Jones? album, unreleased WHO!Print album and mixtapes ===
During 2010 and 2011, Jones went on hiatus. On August 20, 2012, he announced his return, saying his hiatus was due to financial disputes with his former label, Asylum Records, and that money had been taken from him. He announced he had finished his next album, Where Is Mike Jones? (previously known as Expect the Unexpected) and that he was working on its follow-up, WHO!Print, with further plans to release a mixtape, Ballin Underground 2.

On October 31, 2013, Jones released a mixtape titled Back Ballin' Underground.

In an August 28, 2014, interview Jones talked about his upcoming album Where is Mike Jones? and his upcoming mixtape Money Train and said he had signed a new distribution deal with Atlantic Records, saying: "It's just a group of people who are all about making money and having money. Once people really understand what the Money Train is, then they'll be onboard with it." On December 28, Jones released a new single, "3 Grams", featuring Slim Thug and Yung Duece.

On January 1, 2015, Jones released a mixtape, Money Train. On February 5, he announced on Instagram that he was working on another mixtape, Money Train: Reloaded, a sequel to Money Train.

=== 2017–present: Unreleased Guap Season album ===
During his Money Train era, Jones worked with a manager known as Tumbleweed. A 2020 Mike Jones and Money Train performance credited @itztumbleweed as management. Jones also publicly referred to Tumbleweed as his manager during a later Clubhouse conversation involving Wack 100.

In September 2021, Jones announced a new record deal with RBC Records to release his third studio album, Guap Season, in 2022. As of 2026, the album remains unreleased.

== Feuds ==
On February 10, 2007, YouTube user FDTV Video Podcast uploaded a parody video of Chamillionaire shooting Jones. It ridiculed Jones and was the subject of some controversy. By late 2008, the beef between the pair had died down. Chamillionaire apologized to Jones in 2010, officially ending their dispute. He said, live on stage, "From the bottom of my heart, I apologize to Mike Jones for the triple disc Mixtape Messiah 1 diss tracks. I mean no disrespect."

== Discography ==
Studio albums

- Who Is Mike Jones? (2005)
- The Voice (2009)

== Filmography ==
Film
Year	Title	Role	Notes
2007	The American Dream	Himself	Autobiographical film
2007	Furnace	Detective James Fury	
2023	H-Town	Himself	TV-MA (Streaming on Peacock)

Television
Year	Title	Role	Notes
2005	Punk'd	Himself	Season 6, Episode 5: Neve Campbell, Mike Jones and Danny Masterson
2005	Prison Break	Darius Morgan	Season 1, Episode 16: Brother’s Keeper
2006	Wild 'n Out	Himself	Team Captain & Performer
2006	The Andy Milonakis Show	Himself	Season 2, Episode 5
2007	The Game	Himself	Guest star
