= Chamillionaire discography =

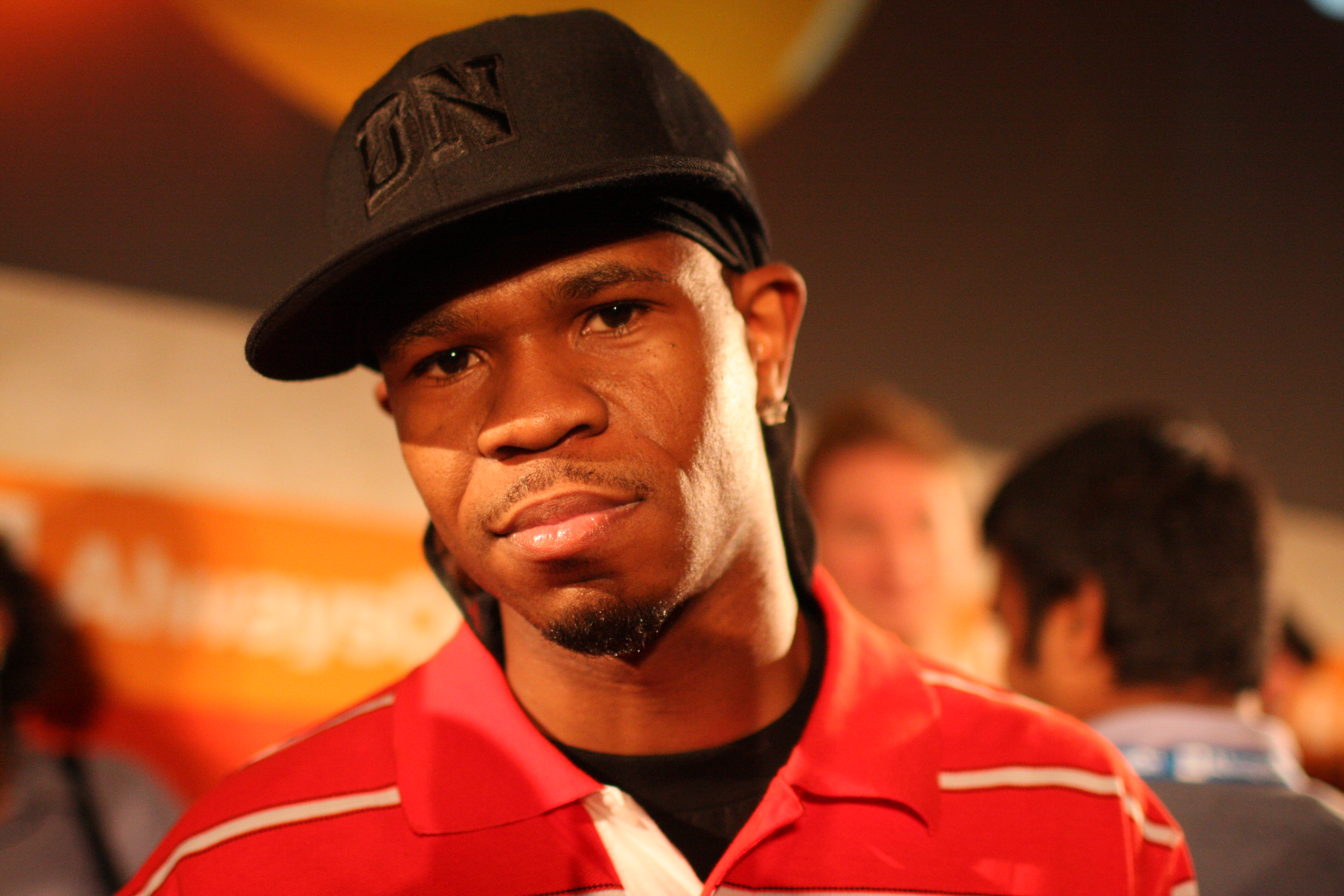
- Chamillionaire in July 2008
- Studio albums: 2
- Extended plays: 3
- Compilation albums: 5
- Singles: 40
- Music videos: 28
- Collaborations: 97
- Collaborative albums: 2
- Mixtapes: 20

This is the discography of Chamillionaire, an American rapper from Houston, Texas.

== Albums ==
=== Studio albums ===
List of studio albums, with selected chart positions and certifications
Title	Album details	Peak chart positions									Certifications
Title	Album details	US	US R&B	CAN	FRA	GER	IRE	NZ	SWI	UK	Certifications
The Sound of Revenge	Released: November 22, 2005; Label: Chamillitary, Universal; Format: CD, LP, digital download	10	2	18	68	100	34	11	—	22	RIAA: Platinum; BPI: Gold
Ultimate Victory	Released: September 18, 2007; Label: Chamillitary, Universal Motown; Format: CD, digital download	8	3	19	97	—	74	—	65	91	
"—" denotes a recording that did not chart or was not released in that territory.

=== Collaborative albums ===
List of collaborative albums, with selected chart positions and sales figures
Title	Album details	Peak chart positions			Sales
Title	Album details	US	US R&B	US Rap	Sales
Get Ya Mind Correct (with Paul Wall)	Released: June 25, 2002; Label: Paid in Full; Format: CD, digital download	—	67	—	US: 150,000
Controversy Sells (with Paul Wall)	Released: January 25, 2005; Label: Paid in Full; Format: CD, digital download	—	50	—	
"—" denotes a recording that did not chart or was not released in that territory.

=== Compilation albums ===
Title	Album details
Greatest Hits	Released: 2003; Label: Chamillitary; Format: CD, digital download
Chamillitary (with The Color Changin' Click)	Released: 2005; Label: Chamillitary; Format: CD, digital download

== Extended plays ==
List of extended plays, with selected chart positions
Title	EP details	Peak chart positions	
Title	EP details	US R&B	US Rap
Ammunition	Released: March 20, 2012; Label: Chamillitary; Format: CD, digital download	—	—
Elevate	Released: February 12, 2013; Label: Chamillitary; Format: CD, digital download	—	—
Reignfall	Released: July 23, 2013; Label: Chamillitary; Format: CD, digital download	40	24
"—" denotes a title that did not chart, or was not released in that territory.

== Mixtapes ==
Title	Mixtape details
King Koopa: The Mixtape Messiah (see also Mixtape Messiah)	Released: February 15, 2004; Label: Self-released; Format: Digital download
The Truth: From the Ground Up	Released: 2005; Label: Self-released; Format: Digital download
Man on Fire	Released: 2005; Label: Self-released; Format: Digital download
Mixtape Messiah 2	Released: 2006; Label: Self-released; Format: Digital download
Chamillitary Therapy	Released: 2006; Label: Self-released; Format: Digital download
Mixtape Messiah 3	Released: July 18, 2007; Label: Self-released; Format: Digital download
Mixtape Messiah 4	Released: August 27, 2008; Label: Self-released; Format: Digital download
Mixtape Messiah 5	Released: 2008; Label: Self-released; Format: Digital download
Hangin' Wit' Mr. Koopa	Released: 2009; Label: Self-released; Format: Digital download
Mixtape Messiah 6	Released: 2009; Label: Self-released; Format: Digital download
Digital Dynasty 4 (with Advocate & BallerStatus)	Released: 2009; Label: Self-released; Format: Digital download
I Am Legend: Greatest Verses	Released: 2009; Label: Self-released; Format: Digital download
Mixtape Messiah 7	Released: August 4, 2009; Label: Self-released; Format: Digital download
Major Pain	Released: 2010; Label: Self-released; Format: Digital download
Major Pain 1.5	Released: 2011; Label: Self-released; Format: Digital download
Badazz Freemixes	Released: 2011; Label: Self-released; Format: Digital download
Badazz Slow-Mixes	Released: 2011; Label: Self-released; Format: Digital download
Badazz Freemixes 2	Released: 2011; Label: Self-released; Format: Digital download
Greatest Verses, Vol. 2	Released: 2014; Label: Self-released; Format: Digital download
Greatest Verses 3	Released: 2018; Label: Self-released; Format: Digital download

== Singles ==
=== As lead artist ===
List of singles as lead artist, with selected chart positions and certifications, showing year released and album name
Title	Year	Peak chart positions										Certifications	Album
Title	Year	US	US R&B	US Rap	AUS	CAN	GER	NZ	SWE	SWI	UK	Certifications	Album
"Turn It Up" (featuring Lil' Flip)	2005	41	31	9	—	—	—	—	—	—	—	RIAA: Gold	The Sound of Revenge
"Ridin'" (featuring Krayzie Bone)	2006	1	7	2	24	6	8	2	25	19	2	RIAA: 4× Platinum; BPI: Gold; BVMI: Platinum; GLF: Gold; MC: 6× Platinum; RMNZ: Platinum	The Sound of Revenge
"Grown and Sexy"	2006	—	—	—	—	—	—	21	—	—	35		The Sound of Revenge
"Not a Criminal" (featuring Kelis)	2007	103	105	21	—	—	—	—	—	—	—		Ultimate Victory (scrapped) and Greatest Verses 3
"Hip Hop Police"^{[A]} (featuring Slick Rick)	2007	101	76	—	—	—	46	34	45	—	50		Ultimate Victory
"The Bill Collecta"	2007	—	—	—	—	—	—	—	—	—	—		Ultimate Victory
"Industry Groupie"	2007	—	—	—	—	—	—	—	—	—	—		Ultimate Victory
"Creepin' (Solo)"^{[B]} (featuring Ludacris)	2009	—	101	—	—	—	—	—	—	—	—		Venom (Unreleased)
"I'm So Gone (Patron)" (featuring Bobby V)	2009	—	—	—	—	—	—	—	—	—	—		Venom (Unreleased)
"Good Morning"	2009	40	—	—	—	78	—	—	—	—	—		Venom (Unreleased)
"The Main Event" (featuring Paul Wall, Slim Thug and Dorrough)	2010	—	—	—	—	—	—	—	—	—	—		Venom (Unreleased)
"This My World" (featuring Big K.R.I.T.)	2011	—	—	—	—	—	—	—	—	—	—		Major Pain 1.5 and Poison (Unreleased)
"Show Love" (featuring "D.A")	2012	—	—	—	—	—	—	—	—	—	—		Greatest Verses, Vol. 2
"Don't Shoot"	2013	—	—	—	—	—	—	—	—	—	—		Greatest Verses 3
"Some Things Never Change"	2013	—	—	—	—	—	—	—	—	—	—		Greatest Verses 3
"Go Getta"	2014	—	—	—	—	—	—	—	—	—	—		Non-album single
"—" denotes a title that did not chart, or was not released in that territory.

=== As featured artist ===
List of singles as featured artist, with selected chart positions and certifications, showing year released and album name
Title	Year	Peak chart positions							Certifications	Album
Title	Year	US	US R&B	US Rap	GER	NZ	SWI	UK	Certifications	Album
"Get Up" (Ciara featuring Chamillionaire)	2006	7	10	—	29	5	17	189	RIAA: Platinum; BPI: Silver; RMNZ: Gold	Ciara: The Evolution
"That Girl" (Frankie J featuring Mannie Fresh & Chamillionaire)	2006	43	—	—	—	—	—	—		Priceless
"Bet That" (Trick Daddy featuring Chamillionaire & GoldRu$h)	2006	—	66	—	—	—	—	—		Back By Thug Demand
"King Kong" (Jibbs featuring Chamillionaire)	2006	54	32	18	—	—	—	—		Jibbs Featuring Jibbs
"Doe Boy Fresh" (Three 6 Mafia featuring Chamillionaire)	2007	54	74	—	—	—	—	—	RIAA: Gold	Last 2 Walk (intended)
"I'm On 3.0" (Trae tha Truth featuring T.I., Dave East, Tee Grizzley, Royce da 5'9", Curren$y, DRAM, Snoop Dogg, Fabolous, Rick Ross, Chamillionaire, G-Eazy, Styles P, E-40, Mark Morrison and Gary Clark, Jr.)	2017	—	—	—	—	—	—	—		Tha Truth, Pt. 3
"—" denotes a title that did not chart, or was not released in that territory.

=== Promotional singles ===
List of promotional singles, with selected chart positions, showing year released and album name
Title	Year	Peak chart positions	Album
Title	Year	US R&B	Album
"Draped Up" (Remix) (Bun B featuring Lil' Keke, Slim Thug, Chamillionaire, Paul Wall, Mike Jones, Aztek, Lil' Flip and Z-Ro)	2005	45	Trill
"Make a Movie" (featuring Lloyd & Twista)	2010	—	Venom (Unreleased)
"When Ya On" (featuring Nipsey Hussle)	2011	—	Poison (Unreleased)
"Charlie Sheen"	2011	—	Poison (Unreleased)
"Passenger Seat"	2011	—	Poison (Unreleased)
"—" denotes a title that did not chart, or was not released in that territory.

== Guest appearances ==
List of non-single guest appearances, with other performing artists, showing year released and album name
Title	Year	Other performer(s)	Album
"U See It"	2002	Lil' Flip	Undaground Legend
"Oh No"	2003	Trae, Paul Wall	Losing Composure
"Day 2 Day Grindin'"	2003	Mike Jones, Magno	1st Round Draft Picks
"Playa Roll"	2003	Lucky Luciano, Paul Wall	You Already Know
"I'm a Balla"	2005	Play-N-Skillz	The Album Before The Album
"Talkin' That Talk"	2005	David Banner	The Longest Yard
"I Ain't Never Heard"	2005	Turk, Ke'Noe, S.S.	Still a Hot Boy
"Hate in Ya Eyes"	2005	—N/a	Madden NFL 06
"Call Me"	2005	Play-N-Skillz	The Process
"Grind Time"	2005	—N/a	NBA Live 06
"Can I Take U Home" (Remix)	2006	Jamie Foxx	—N/a
"It's Okay (One Blood)" (Remix)	2006	The Game, Jim Jones, Snoop Dogg, Nas, T.I., Fat Joe, Lil Wayne, N.O.R.E., Jadakiss, Styles P, Fabolous, Juelz Santana, Rick Ross, Twista, Kurupt, Daz Dillinger, WC, E-40, Bun B, Slim Thug, Young Dro, Clipse, Ja Rule	The Dope Game 2
"Platinum Starz"	2006	Scarface, Lil' Flip, Bun B	My Homies Part 2
"Roll With Me"	2006	Balance, Stat Quo	Young & Restless
"Ride With Us"	2006	E.S.G., Bun B	Screwed Up Movement
"Candy Paint"	2006	DJ Khaled, Slim Thug, Trina	Listennn... the Album
"Overstand Me"	2006	Pimp C, Trae	Pimpalation
"Ain't No Other Man" (Remix)	2006	Christina Aguilera	—N/a
"Do Our Thang"	2006	Z-Ro, Big Pokey	1 Deep
"Pop the Trunk"	2006	Papoose, Yung Joc	Second Place Is the First Loser
"Sleep"	2006	2Pac, Young Buck	Pac's Life
"Get It Shawty" (Remix)	2007	Lloyd, Lil Wayne, Big Boi	—N/a
"Playa 4 Life"	2007	Lil' Flip	I Need Mine
"Up Your Speed" (Remix)	2007	Sway DeSafo	One for the Journey
"Coming Home"	2007	Big Hawk, Devin the Dude, Trae	Endangered Species
"Get Dirty"	2007	R. Kelly	Double Up
"Here We Go" (Remix)	2007	Stat Quo	—N/a
"Party Like a Rockstar" (Remix)	2007	Shop Boyz, Lil Wayne, Jim Jones	—N/a
"Its Hard Not to Think About You"	2007	Lil' O	Greatest Hits Album Vol. 1
"Come And Ride"	2007	Young Sid, Tyree	The Truth
"Bollywood to Hollywood (Immigration)"	2007	Wyclef Jean	Carnival Vol. II: Memoirs of an Immigrant
"Get It Big" (Remix)	2008	Trap Starz Clik	Hood Depot
"Ball With Me"	2008	David Banner	The Greatest Story Ever Told
"How We Do It"	2008	V-Zilla, GT Garza	Stay Focused
"Underground Thang"	2008	Bun B, Pimp C	II Trill
"Big Money, Big Cars"	2008	Killer Mike, Messy Marv	I Pledge Allegiance to the Grind II
"2 MPH"	2008	Mistah F.A.B., Bun B, Paul Wall	Mixtape Messiah 4
"Obama 08"	2008	Bun B, Cory Mo, Paul Wall, Trae	—N/a
"6 Million Ways"	2009	Papoose, Bun B	21 Gun Salute
"Bounce"	2009	Lisa Lopes, Bone Crusher	Eye Legacy
"Welcome 2 Houston"	2009	Slim Thug, Paul Wall, Mike Jones, UGK, Lil' Keke, Z-Ro, Trae, Rob G, Lil' O, Big Pokey, Mike D, Yung Redd	Boss of All Bosses
"Don't Give Up"	2009	Lil' O, Slim Thug, Antoinette	Tha Flood (Neva Lay Down Vol. 3)
"Leave Another Behind"	2009	Mddl Fngz, Paul Wall, Bun B	Smokin' Wit' Tha Enemy
"For The OG's"	2009	Bone Thugs-n-Harmony	The Book of Thugs
"Daze" (Remix)	2009	J-Bar, Roscoe Dash, Soulja Boy, Dorrough	—N/a
"Club Go Crazy"	2009	Mýa	Beauty & The Streets Vol.1
"50 In My Pinky"	2010	Lil' Flip, Gudda Gudda	Ahead of My Time
"Round Here"	2010	Paul Wall	Heart of a Champion
"Love 2 Ball"	2010	Pimp C	The Naked Soul of Sweet Jones
"Diamonds Exposed"	2010	Lil' Keke, Paul Wall	The Don Ke Chronicles
"Get Off Me" (Remix)	2010	Marcus Manchild, Bun B, Slim Thug, Paul Wall, Kirko Bangz	—N/a
"We Will Rock You"	2011	Ron Artest, Paul Wall, Joe Smith, Moniece	BALL'N MIXTAPE
"My Hood"	2011	Layzie Bone, Tha Bizniz	The Definition
"Time Machine"	2011	Big K.R.I.T.	Return of 4Eva
"In Da Wind"	2011	Lil' O, Killa Kyleon	Grind Hard, Pray Harder
"One Way"	2011	Outlawz	Killuminati 2K11
"The Way You Are" (Remix)	2011	Darey	—N/a
"Breakthrough"	2011	Rockie Fresh	—N/a
"Houston"	2011	Slim Thug, Paul Wall	Houston
"Po Pimp"	2012	Rap-a-Lot Records, Hurricane Chris, Gator Mane	The 25th Anniversary Rap Collection
"Mayday"	2012	Krizz Kaliko, Rittz	Kickin' and Screamin'
"No Mercy"	2012	Marcus Manchild	—N/a
"Throw It"	2012	J-Bar	—N/a
"Money"	2012	40 Glocc, Paul Wall, OJ da Juiceman	New World Agenda
"Anywhere But Here"	2012	Killer Mike, Emily Panic	R.A.P. Music
"Keep Pushing"	2012	Saigon	The Greatest Story Never Told Chapter 2: Bread and Circuses
"Cat Daddy" (Remix)	2012	The Rej3ctz, Tyga, Mann, Dorrough	—N/a
"No Room in Hell"	2012	Sam B	—N/a
"Nothing You Can Do"	2013	M.I x Tyler Keyes, Corbett	Pushing Keyes
"Don't Piss Me Off"	2013	Mac Lethal	Postcards from Kansas City
"Swangin" (Remix)	2013	Stalley, Lil Keke, Trae tha Truth, Bun B, E.S.G.	—N/a
"All on Me"	2014	Chalie Boy, Duce D	#CHALIE
"Sweet Dreams"	2015	BeatKing	Club God 4
"Diamonds in the Sky"	2021	Big Pokey, Killa Kyleon, Kirko Bangz and Lisa Lee	Sensei
"Been Broke"	2022	Tobe Nwigwe, Fat Nwigwe, 2 Chainz	moMINTS

== Music videos ==
Year	Song	Director	Album
2005	"Turn It Up" (featuring Lil' Flip)		The Sound of Revenge
2006	"Ridin'" (featuring Krayzie Bone)		The Sound of Revenge
2006	"Grown and Sexy"		The Sound of Revenge
2007	"Hip Hop Police" (featuring Slick Rick)		Ultimate Victory
2007	"The Evening News"		Ultimate Victory
2009	"Good Morning"		Venom
2011	"This My World" (featuring Big K.R.I.T.)		Major Pain 1.5
2012	"Show Love" (featuring D.A.)	Bowser	Poison (Unreleased)
2013	"Overnight"	Jacob Owens	Elevate

=== Featured music videos ===
Year	Song	Artist(s)	Director	Album
2006	"Get Up" (featuring Chamillionaire)	Ciara		Ciara: The Evolution
2006	"That Girl" (featuring Chamillionaire and Mannie Fresh)	Frankie J		Priceless
2006	"Bet That" (featuring Chamillionaire and Goldrush)	Trick Daddy		Back by Thug Demand
2006	"King Kong" (featuring Chamillionaire)	Jibbs		Jibbs Featuring Jibbs
2007	"Doe Boy Fresh" (featuring Chamillionaire)	Three 6 Mafia		Last 2 Walk
2009	"Can't Stop Partying (Live)" (featuring Chamillionaire)	Weezer		Raditude (Note: The studio recording featured Lil Wayne, instead of Chamillionaire.)
2012	"No Room in Hell" (featuring Chamillionaire)	Sam B		Dead Island: Riptide

== Notes ==
- A "Hip Hop Police" did not enter the Billboard Hot 100, but peaked at number 1 on the Bubbling Under Hot 100 Singles chart, which acts as a 25-song extension to the Hot 100.
- B "Creepin' (Solo)" did not enter the Hot R&B/Hip-Hop Songs chart, but peaked at number 1 on the Bubbling Under R&B/Hip-Hop Singles chart, which acts as a 25-song extension to the R&B/Hip-Hop Songs chart.
- C "Not a Criminal" did not enter the Billboard Hot 100, but peaked at number 3 on the Bubbling Under Hot 100 Singles chart, which acts as a 25-song extension to the Hot 100. It did not enter the Hot R&B/Hip-Hop Songs chart, but peaked at number 5 on the Bubbling Under R&B/Hip-Hop Singles chart, which acts as a 25-song extension to the R&B/Hip-Hop Songs chart.
