= Not a Criminal =

Song by Chamillionaire featuring Kelis

from the album Ultimate Victory (intended) and Greatest Verses 3
- Released: February 13, 2007
- Recorded: 2007
- Genre: Hip hop
- Length: 4:23
- Label: Universal, Chamillitary
- Songwriters: Hakeem Seriki, Kelis Rogers-Jones
- Producer: Styalz Fuego

"Not a Criminal" is a track that was slated for Chamillionaire's second album, Ultimate Victory (2007). It was released on February 13, 2007. The song, which features Kelis on the chorus, was originally going to be released as the album's lead single, but was replaced by "Hip Hop Police". It was produced by Australian producer Styalz Fuego of the Affinity Music Group. The song has another version, "Not a Criminal Part II", which features Busta Rhymes and Snoop Dogg. The single debuted and peaked at number three on the Bubbling Under Hot 100 Singles chart. In 2018, the song was released on Greatest Verses 3.

== Charts ==
Chart (2007)	Peak Position
U.S. Billboard Bubbling Under Hot 100	3
U.S. Billboard Bubbling Under R&B/Hip-Hop Singles	5
U.S. Billboard Hot Rap Tracks	21
