= Mixtape Messiah =

Mixtape series by Chamillionaire

Mixtape by Chamillionaire
- Released: The Mixtape Messiah (2004); Mixtape Messiah 2 (2005); Mixtape Messiah 3 (2007); Mixtape Messiah 4 (2008); Mixtape Messiah 5 (2008); Mixtape Messiah 6 (2009); Mixtape Messiah 7 (2009)
- Genre: Hip hop
- Label: Chamillitary Entertainment

Mixtape Messiah is a series of mixtapes by Houston rapper Chamillionaire. The Mixtape Messiah was his first in the series, which was released on February 15, 2004. Featuring 61 tracks over three CDs, this triple mixtape is the longest and most bought mixtape in Texas history. Mixtape Messiah 7 was released on August 4, 2009, and was officially confirmed to be the final mixtape in the series.

== History ==
=== The Mixtape Messiah (2004) ===
King Koopa: The Mixtape Messiah

Mixtape by Chamillionaire
- Released: February 15, 2004
- Recorded: 2003–2004
- Genre: Hip hop
- Label: Chamillitary

Chamillionaire chronology
King Koopa: The Mixtape Messiah (2004)	Mixtape Messiah 2 (2006)

King Koopa: The Mixtape Messiah is the first mixtape by Houston rapper Chamillionaire, released in 2004. Featuring 61 tracks over three CDs, this triple album is the longest and most bought mixtape in Texas history.

==== Track listing ====
Disc 1

1. "I'm Da' King" - samples "King of the South" by T.I. - Instrumental from "Show Ya Tattoos" by Lil Boosie & Webbie
2. "Shut Up (Interlude)"
3. "You Got Wrecked" - Instrumental from "Bow Down" by Westside Connection
4. "New Name (Interlude)"
5. "Who They Want" - Instrumental from "Game Over (Flip)" by Lil' Flip
6. "I Mean that There" - Instrumental from "Hold Up" by David Banner
7. "Run You out the Game" - Instrumental from "All I Know" by Lil' Flip
8. "Not Friendly" - Instrumental from "You Don't Want Drama" by 8Ball & MJG
9. "Roll Call" - Instrumental from "Jiggalaters (Remix)" by Sam I Am
10. "Talk Show (Interlude)"
11. "Gun Smoke" - Instrumental from "Hard Not 2 Kill" by Three 6 Mafia
12. "Drag 'Em in the River" (featuring Rasaq) - Instrumental from "What U Gon' Do" by Lil Jon & The East Side Boyz
13. "What Would You Do" - Instrumental from "Salute U"by G-Unit
14. "Switch Styles" - Instrumental from "What Y'all Wanna Do" by Lil' Flip
15. "Body Rock" - Instrumental from "Lean Back" by Fat Joe
16. "Step into My Room" - Instrumental from "Let's Get Away" by T.I.
17. "Answer Machine (Interlude)" - Instrumental from "Is A Playa" by Guerilla Maab
18. "I'm Busy" - Instrumental from "Is A Playa" by Guerilla Maab
19. "Put It in Slow Motion" - Instrumental from "Slow Motion" by Juvenile
20. "Screw Jamz" - Instrumental from "Slow Jamz" by Twista
21. "I Had a Dream" - Instrumental from "A Dream" by Jay-Z
22. "The Truth" - Instrumental from "This Can't Be Life" by Jay-Z

Disc 2

- Screwed and Chopped by OG RON C
1. "I'm da King (Screwed and Chopped)"
2. "Roll Call (Screwed and Chopped)"
3. "I'm a Balla (Screwed and Chopped)"
4. "Who they Want (Screwed and Chopped)"
5. "On Yo Azz (Screwed and Chopped)"
6. "What Would You Do (Screwed and Chopped)"
7. "Pimp Drill (feat. Color Changin' Click) (Screwed and Chopped)"
8. "I Mean That There (Screwed and Chopped)"
9. "Run You Out the Game (Screwed and Chopped)"
10. "Switch Styles (Screwed and Chopped)"
11. "I Had a Dream (Screwed and Chopped)"
12. "O.G. Ron C Guttamix (Screwed and Chopped)"
13. "Body Rock (Screwed and Chopped)"
14. "We on Fire (feat. Color Changin' Click) (Screwed and Chopped)"
15. "You Got Wrecked (Screwed and Chopped)"
16. "Not Friendly (Screwed and Chopped)"
17. "Gun Smoke (Screwed and Chopped)"
18. "Answer Machine (Interlude) (feat. O.G. Ron C) (Screwed and Chopped)"

Disc 3

1. "Front to Back" (featuring Rasaq & Yung Ro)
2. "Who I Be (Rasaq)" - Instrumental from "Look What I Got" by T.I.
3. "Gun Smoke" (featuring Yung Ro) - Instrumental from "Hard Not 2 Kill" by Gangsta Boo
4. "We Gonna Ride" (featuring Rasaq) - Instrumental from "Badunkadunk" by Twista
5. "I Be Comin Down (Screwed) (Rasaq)" - Instrumental from "Don't Make" by 8Ball & MJG
6. "Call Some Hoes" (featuring Kanye West & Stat Quo)
7. "I Got Hoes (Screwed)" (featuring Rasaq)"
8. "On Yo Azz"
9. "Texas Boys" (Rasaq)
10. "Hey Lady" (featuring Big Gem)
11. "Pimp Drill"
12. "Panky Rang (Interlude)" (featuring Rasaq)
13. "Hurtin 'em Bad"
14. "We on Fire" (featuring The Color Changin' Click) - Instrumental from "On Fire" by Lloyd Banks
15. "I'm a Balla" (featuring Play-N-Skillz, Far East & Lumba)
16. "I Tip Down" (featuring Rasaq) - Instrumental from "Who Gives a Fuck Where You From" by Three 6 Mafia
17. "Who They Want" (featuring Rasaq) - Instrumental from "Game Over" by Lil' Flip
18. "Platinum Stars" (featuring Lil' Flip & Bun B) - Instrumental from Gimme a Break! by Nell Carter
19. "Tippin' Slow"(featuring Rasaq)" - Instrumental from Round Here by Memphis Bleek
20. "Still Tippin'" (featuring Slim Thug)
21. "Weatherman" (featuring Paul Wall)

=== Mixtape Messiah 2 (2005-2006) ===
Mixtape Messiah 2

Mixtape by Chamillionaire
- Released: January 5, 2006
- Recorded: 2005
- Genre: Hip hop
- Label: Chamillitary

Chamillionaire chronology
The Mixtape Messiah (2005)	Mixtape Messiah 2 (2006)	Mixtape Messiah 3 (2007)

Mixtape Messiah 2 is the second mixtape in the Mixtape Messiah series. It was recorded in 2005, and it was released January 1, 2006.

==== Track listing ====
1. Guess Who's Back (Intro)
2. Hip Hop Warning - Instrumental from "Hip Hop Is Dead" by Nas
3. She Gonna Already Know
4. Let 'Em Know Lyrics - Instrumental from "Kryptonite (I'm on It)" by Purple Ribbon All-Stars
5. Tryin' To Change Me - Instrumental from "Gangsta, Gangsta" by Lil Scrappy
6. Picture Me Rollin' - Instrumental from "Picture Me Rollin'" by 2Pac
7. Game Gonna Cost A Fee - Instrumental from "The Game Belongs to Me" by UGK
8. Ridin' Overseas (feat. Akon)
9. Show Me What Ya Got - Instrumental from "Show Me What You Got" by Jay-Z
10. Answer Machine 2
11. International Money
12. I Run It
13. Get Ya Umbrellas Out
14. Man, Hold Up
15. Roll Call Reloaded

=== Mixtape Messiah 3 (2006-2007) ===
Mixtape Messiah 3

Mixtape by Chamillionaire
- Released: July 18, 2007
- Recorded: 2006–2007
- Genre: Hip hop
- Label: Chamillitary / Universal Records

Chamillionaire chronology
Mixtape Messiah 2 (2006)	Mixtape Messiah 3 (2007)	Mixtape Messiah 4 (2008)

Mixtape Messiah 3 is the third mixtape by southern rapper Chamillionaire. It was released as a free download on Chamillionaire's official website on July 18, 2007 at 11:00 P.M. EDT to promote his album Ultimate Victory, then scheduled for release three months later.

==== Track listing ====
#	Title	Producer(s)	Note(s)	Time
1	"Get Ya Burners Out"	Play-n-Skillz	Original Production	3:52
2	"Money Already Made"	Apex	Instrumental from: 50 Cent - I Get Money	3:18
3	"Get On My Level"	Timbaland	Instrumental from: Fabolous - Make Me Better	3:04
4	"Living Good"	Scott Storch	Instrumental from: Brisco - I'm In Tha Hood	2:22
5	"It's Just Pain"	Eminem	Instrumental from: Jay-Z - Renegade	2:37
6	"The Call"	Eminem	Instrumental from: Jay-Z - Renegade	1:00
7	"Nothin' But Lies"	Kanye West, DJ Toomp	Instrumental from: Kanye West - Can't Tell Me Nothing	3:27
8	"Ima Playa FaSho"	DJ Paul & Juicy J	Instrumental from: UGK - International Player's Anthem (I Choose You)	2:48
9	"Roy Wood Jr Pt. 1"			1:54
10	"Failure's Not an Option"	Mannie Fresh	Instrumental from: T.I. - Big Shit Poppin' (Do It)	2:17
11	"Got a Lot of Options"	Kane Beatz	Instrumental from: Trick Daddy - Tuck Ya Ice	3:02
12	"See It in My Eyes"	Mr. Lee	Instrumental from: Lil' Keke - I'm a G	3:24
13	"Don't Hurt 'Em Hammer"	Kanye West	Instrumental from: Common - The People	4:25
14	"Roy Woods Jr skit Pt. 2"	Kanye West	Instrumental from: Common - The People	0:56
15	"It's On"	Mouse	Instrumental from: Foxx - Wipe Me Down	3:40
16	"You a Dummy"	Scott Storch	Instrumental from: Birdman & Lil' Wayne - You Ain't Know	2:43
17	"Chamillionaire Speaks"	Scott Storch	Instrumental from: Birdman & Lil' Wayne - You Ain't Know	1:41
18	"Mo Scrilla"	The Runners	Instrumental from: Young Jeezy - Go Getta	2:02
19	"The Crowd Goes Wild"	David Banner, Deezle, Akon	Instrumental from: David Banner - 9mm	2:36
20	"Makes Me Stronger"	Kanye West	Instrumental from: Kanye West - Stronger	2:28
21	"Chamillionaire Speaks 2"	Kanye West	Instrumental from: Kanye West - Stronger	1:18
22	"Rain"	Chink Santana, Broken Equipment Productions	Instrumental from: Jim Jones - Emotionless	3:27

=== Mixtape Messiah 4 (2007-2008) ===
Mixtape Messiah 4

Mixtape by Chamillionaire
- Released: 2008
- Recorded: 2007–2008
- Genre: Hip hop
- Label: Chamillitary / Universal Records

Chamillionaire chronology
Mixtape Messiah 3 (2007)	Mixtape Messiah 4 (2008)	Mixtape Messiah 5 (2008)

Mixtape Messiah 4 is the fourth mixtape by Chamillionaire in his Mixtape Messiah series. It is a two-disc set that was released on August 27, 2008.

==== Track listing ====
Disc 1

#	Title	Artist(s)	Note(s)	Time
1	"The Horror Flick Intro"	Chamillionaire		4:01
2	"Go Hard"	Chamillionaire	Instrumental from: Clipse - 20k Money Making Brothers on the Corner	5:10
3	"Fire Drill"	Chamillionaire	Instrumental from: B.G. - For A Minute	1:09
4	"Roll Call Reloaded"	Chamillionaire	Instrumental from: B.G. – For A Minute	5:09
5	"The Real Thang"	Chamillionaire	Instrumental from: Busta Rhymes featuring Linkin Park - We Made It	3:57
6	"All Around The World"	Chamillionaire	Instrumental from: Lloyd - Girls Around the World	4:22
7	"Do It For H-Town"	Chamillionaire feat. Slim Thug & Trae	Instrumental from: Bun B - You're Everything	5:55
8	"Skit 1 (Roy Wood Jr.)"	Chamillionaire	Instrumental from: Pimp C - Pussy Nigga Anthum	1:26
9	"Internet Nerds Revenge"	Chamillionaire	Instrumental from: Three 6 Mafia - Suga Daddy	3:40
10	"Fire"	Chamillionaire feat. Famous	Instrumental from: UNK -Hit The Dance Floor	3:26
11	"Hero"	Chamillionaire	Instrumental from: Nas - Hero	4:02
12	"My Dream"	Chamillionaire feat. Akon	Instrumental from: Crooked I - Dream Big	4:20
13	"Bay Area Skit"	Chamillionaire feat. Guce & Emcee T	Instrumental from:	0:47
14	"Gotta Be Playa"	Chamillionaire feat. Famous	Instrumental from:	4:45
15	"Not Your Baby"	Chamillionaire feat. Ms Crys J	Instrumental from: LL Cool J - Baby	1:02
16	"Answer Machine 3"	Chamillionaire feat. Ms Crys J	Instrumental from: LL Cool J - Baby	3:28
17	"The Greatest"	Chamillionaire	Instrumental from: Lupe Fiasco - Kick, Push	2:11
18	"Skit 2 (Roy Wood Jr.) "	Chamillionaire	Instrumental from: Lupe Fiasco - Kick, Push	1:33
19	"On The Grind Homie"	Chamillionaire	Instrumental from: Shawty Lo - Foolish	3:59
20	"My Life"	Chamillionaire feat. Trae & Slim Thug	Instrumental from: The Game - My Life	5:34
21	"Middle Finger Up"	Chamillionaire	Instrumental from: Usher - Moving Mountains	3:53

Disc 2

#	Title	Artist(s)	Note(s)	Time
1	"What The Business Is"	Chamillionaire	Instrumental from: Jay-Z - Blue Magic	3:19
2	"Who Hotter Than Me"	Chamillionaire feat. Famous	Instrumental from: Plies – Who Hotter Than Me	3:18
3	"Lovin’ What You See"	Chamillionaire	Instrumental from: Blood Raw - 26 Inches	3:00
4	"Cadillac & Benz"	Killa Kyleon feat. Chamillionaire	Instrumental from: Royce – Cadillac N Benz	3:29
5	"Put On For Houston"	Chamillionaire	Instrumental from: Young Jeezy – Put On	4:03
6	"She’s Watching Me Skit"	Chamillionaire	Instrumental from:	0:24
7	"I’d Rather Get Some Bread"	Chamillionaire	Instrumental from: Three 6 Mafia –I’d Rather	3:49
8	"Fire Drill Skill"	Chamillionaire	Instrumental from: BG – For A Minute	0:56
9	"Flow So Sick"	Killa Kyleon	Instrumental from: Nelly - Party People	0:51
10	"Top Down Money Up"	Chamillionaire	Instrumental from: Shawty Lo - Foolish	3:43
11	"Block On Smash"	Chamillionaire	Instrumental from:	2:56
12	"Never"	Chamillionaire feat. Killer Mike	Instrumental from: Scarface - Never	2:00
13	"Diamonds Exposed Break"	Chamillionaire	Instrumental from: Paul Wall - Diamonds Exposed	3:31
14	"2 Real"	Lil’ Flip feat. Chamillionaire		4:25
15	"2 MPH"	Mistah Fab feat. Bun B, Paul Wall & Chamillionaire		4:40
16	"This Isn’t Life (Outro)"	Chamillionaire	Instrumental from: Sean P - Everywhere I Go	2:54

=== Mixtape Messiah 5 (2008) ===
Mixtape Messiah 5

Mixtape by Chamillionaire
- Released: 2008
- Genre: Hip hop
- Label: Chamillitary / Universal Records

Chamillionaire chronology
Mixtape Messiah 4 (2007)	Mixtape Messiah 5 (2008)	Mixtape Messiah 6 (2009)

Mixtape Messiah 5 is the fifth mixtape by Chamillionaire is his Mixtape Messiah series. It was released in 2008.

==== Track listing ====
1. Intro (4:15)
2. Keep Hating, Pt. II (2:02)
3. Swagga' Like Koopa (4:19)
4. I Got (2:43)
5. Internet Nerds Brother (2:50)
6. Chop Chop Chop (4:05)
7. The One to Hate (2:32)
8. All I Got Is Pain (3:02)
9. Act Right (2:34)
10. Freeway (1:55)
11. Car Windows (2:59)
12. Car Skit (3:00)
13. Really Isn't Fair (2:17)
14. Ran Out of Auto-Tune (1:32)
15. Can't Get Enough (3:16)
16. Answering Machine Skit (1:12)
17. Pimp Talk (2:14)
18. Ready For Whatever (4:10)
19. Do Ya Thing (2:32)
20. Solo (Break) (4:37)
21. Texas 4 Life (4:37)
22. No Hate (2:49)

=== Mixtape Messiah 6 (2008-2009) ===
Mixtape Messiah 6

Mixtape by Chamillionaire
- Released: January 5, 2009
- Recorded: 2008
- Genre: Hip hop
- Label: Chamillitary / Universal Records

Chamillionaire chronology
Mixtape Messiah 5 (2008)	Mixtape Messiah 6 (2009)	Mixtape Messiah 7 (2009)

Mixtape Messiah 6 is the sixth mixtape by Chamillionaire in his Mixtape Messiah series. It was recorded in 2008, and it was later released on January 5, 2009.

==== Track listing ====
1. Best Rapper Alive
2. Love of Money
3. Throwdest in the Game
4. Mixtape Murder
5. The Evaluation
6. One Day
7. Track Wrecka
8. Everything
9. Switch Styles Reloaded
10. Murder They Wrote
11. For The Moment
12. Shine So Clean
13. Judge Judy
14. Shawty (Feat. Chalie Boy) Produced by @LoudNoyz

=== Mixtape Messiah 7 (2009) ===
Mixtape Messiah 7

Mixtape by Chamillionaire
- Released: August 4, 2009
- Recorded: 2008–2009
- Genre: Hip hop
- Label: Chamillitary

Chamillionaire chronology
Mixtape Messiah 6 (2009)	Mixtape Messiah 7 (2009)

Mixtape Messiah 7 is the seventh mixtape by southern rapper Chamillionaire. It is also the final mixtape in his Mixtape Messiah series.

==== Track listing ====
Disc one (mixed by Chamillionaire)
No.	Title	Instrumental	Length
1.	"The Final Chapter"		0:21
2.	"Famous" (featuring Famous)	Mean Streets by Raekwon	3:44
3.	"Internet Thugs Attack"	Summer in the City by Wax and EOM	4:09
4.	"100 Million"	100 Million by Birdman	3:27
5.	"Best She Ever Had"	Best I Ever Had by Drake	3:10
6.	"Breathe"	Breathe by Fabolous	1:56
7.	"I Know Ya Mad" (featuring Bun B)		4:18
8.	"Denzel Washington" (featuring Z-Ro)		4:19
9.	"Day Dream"	Daydreamin' by Lupe Fiasco	1:47
10.	"Jewelry Skit"		2:28
11.	"Gucci & Fendi"		4:02
12.	"Playa Status"	Uptown by Drake	4:34
13.	"This Morning"	Dis Mornin by Rocko	2:21
14.	"Coming Down Candy"	Comin Down Candy by UGK	1:26
15.	"Solo" (featuring Crooked I)	Creepin' (Solo) by Chamillionaire	2:35
16.	"The One"	Public Service Announcement by Jay-Z	2:33
17.	"Still Hustlin"	Love Me by 112	1:47
18.	"Bike Repo Skit"	Love Me by 112	2:29
19.	"Scratch That"	Chillin by Wale	1:58
20.	"Dead Presidents"	Dead Presidents II by Jay-Z	3:14
21.	"Successful"	Successful by Drake	2:36
22.	"On My Grind"	Day 'n' Nite by Kid Cudi	1:45
23.	"Lonely at the Top"	Let's Get This Paper by Rich Boy	4:37
24.	"Life Goes On" (featuring Tony Henry)		4:41
25.	"Say Goodbye"		4:45
26.	"For the Money Outro"	Money by The Game	4:52
Total length:			79:54

Disc two (mixed by DJ Rapid Ric)
No.	Title	Instrumental	Length
1.	"The Final Chapter 2"	None	1:55
2.	"Still Getting Money"	Plenty Money by Plies	1:51
3.	"In My City Mayne"	In My City by Killer Mike	2:32
4.	"Big Deal"	Kinda Like A Big Deal by Clipse	1:48
5.	"I'm 2 Good"	I Look Good by Chalie Boy	1:48
6.	"How We Do It"	You Know How We Do It by Ice Cube	2:15
7.	"The Realeast Eva"	Fresh by 6 Tre Gangsta and Lil' Boosie	1:54
8.	"Ain't Nobody"	Kim Kardashian by Lil' Flip	2:02
9.	"King Of Tomorrow"	King of Sorrow by Sade	3:52
10.	"City Lights"	City Lights by Method Man & Redman	1:57
11.	"Just Smile"	Smile by Scarface	3:04
12.	"Final Story"	Gangsta Rap Made Me Do It by Ice Cube	4:16
13.	"I'm On It (Bonus Track)"	None	4:42
Total length:			33:56

Disc three (mixed by DJ Michael '5000' Watts)
No.	Title	Instrumental	Length
1.	"Denzel Washington (Watts Regular)"	None	4:53
2.	"Best She Ever Had (Watts Regular)"	Best I Ever Had by Drake	3:16
3.	"Old School Break (Watts Regular)"	None	0:23
4.	"Internet Thugs Attack (Watts Regular)"	Summer in the City by Wax and E.O.M	3:35
5.	"Day Dream (Watts Regular)"	Daydreamin' by Lupe Fiasco	1:44
6.	"Jewelry Skit (Watts Regular)"	None	2:28
7.	"Famous (Watts Regular)" (feat. Famous)	None	4:07
8.	"Breathe (Watts Regular)"	Breathe by Fabolous	2:11
9.	"Mixtape Madoff (Watts Regular)"	Get To Poppin' by Rich Boy	2:05
10.	"Dead Presidents (Watts Regular)"	Dead Presidents II by Jay-Z	2:40
11.	"The One (Watts Regular)"	Public Service Announcement by Jay-Z	2:57
12.	"Life Goes On (Watts Regular)" (feat. Tony Henry)	None	4:24
13.	"Scratch That Outro (Watts Regular)"	Chillin by Wale	2:12
Total length:			36:55

Disc four (chopped & screwed by DJ Michael '5000' Watts)
No.	Title	Instrumental	Length
1.	"Denzel Washington (Watts Screwed)"	None	4:53
2.	"Best She Ever Had (Watts Screwed)"	Best I Ever Had by Drake	3:16
3.	"Old School Break (Watts Screwed)"	None	0:23
4.	"Internet Thugs Attack (Watts Screwed)"	Summer in the City by Wax and E.O.M	3:35
5.	"Day Dream (Watts Screwed)"	Daydreamin' by Lupe Fiasco	1:44
6.	"Jewelry Skit (Watts Screwed)"	None	2:28
7.	"Famous (Watts Screwed)" (feat. Famous)	None	4:07
8.	"Breathe (Watts Screwed)"	Breathe by Fabolous	2:11
9.	"Mixtape Madoff (Watts Screwed)"	Get To Poppin' by Rich Boy	2:05
10.	"Dead Presidents (Watts Screwed)"	Dead Presidents II by Jay-Z	2:40
11.	"Break (Watts Screwed)"	None	0:34
12.	"The One (Watts Screwed)"	Public Service Announcement by Jay-Z	2:57
13.	"Life Goes On (Watts Screwed)" (feat. Tony Henry)	None	4:24
14.	"Scratch That Outro (Watts Screwed)"	Chillin by Wale	2:12
Total length:			37:29
