= The Mixtape Messiah =

King Koopa: The Mixtape Messiah

Mixtape by Chamillionaire
- Released: February 15, 2004
- Recorded: 2003–04
- Genre: Hip hop
- Label: Chamillitary

Chamillionaire chronology
King Koopa: The Mixtape Messiah (2004)	Mixtape Messiah 2 (2006)

King Koopa: The Mixtape Messiah is a mixtape by Houston rapper Chamillionaire. It was released on February 15, 2004. The release consists of three discs and is 61 tracks long, it is the longest and best-selling mixtape in all of Texas hip-hop. It is the first mixtape in the Mixtape Messiah series. The mixtape established Chamillionaire as one of the premier artists in the Southern rap music industry at the time of its release and was the pivotal mixtape that developed his fan base and ability to obtain mainstream success with the release of The Sound of Revenge years later.

The first CD is mostly disses directed at Mike Jones, the second CD features tracks from the first and third CDs and is screwed and chopped by OG Ron C, and the third CD mostly features collaborations with members of Color Changin' Click.

== Track listing ==
=== Disc 1 ===
1. "I'm da King" - samples "King Of The South" by T.I. - Instrumental from "Show Ya Tattoos" by Lil Boosie & Webbie
2. "Shut Up (Interlude)"
3. "You Got Wrecked" - Instrumental from "Bow Down" by Westside Connection
4. "New Name (Interlude)"
5. "Who they Want" - Instrumental from "Game Over (Flip)" by Lil' Flip
6. "I Mean that There" - Instrumental from "Hold Up" by David Banner
7. "Run You Out the Game" - Instrumental from "All I Know" by Lil' Flip (feat. Cam'ron)
8. "Not Friendly" - Instrumental from "You Don't Want Drama" by 8Ball & MJG
9. "Roll Call" - Instrumental from "Jiggalate (Remix)" by Sam I Am
10. "Talk Show (Interlude)"
11. "Gun Smoke" - Instrumental from "Hard Not 2 Kill" by Gangsta Boo
12. "Drag 'Em in the River" (featuring Rasaq) - Instrumental from "What U Gon' Do" by Lil Jon & The East Side Boyz (feat. Lil Scrappy)
13. "What Would You Do" - Instrumental from "Salute U" by G-Unit
14. "Switch Styles" - Instrumental from "What Y'all Wanna Do" by Lil' Flip
15. "Body Rock" - Instrumental from "Lean Back" by Terror Squad
16. "Step into My Room" - Instrumental from "Let's Get Away" by T.I.
17. "Answer Machine (Interlude)" - Instrumental from "Is A Playa" by Guerilla Maab
18. "I'm Busy" - Instrumental from "Is A Playa" by Guerilla Maab
19. "Put It in Slow Motion" - Instrumental from "Slow Motion" by Juvenile
20. "Screw Jamz" - Instrumental from "Slow Jamz" by Twista (feat. Kanye West and Jamie Foxx)
21. "I Had a Dream" - Instrumental from "A Dream" by Jay-Z
22. "The Truth" - Instrumental from "This Can't Be Life" by Jay-Z

=== Disc 2 ===
- Screwed and Chopped by OG RON C
1. "I'm da King (Screwed and Chopped)"
2. "Roll Call (Screwed and Chopped)"
3. "I'm a Balla (Screwed and Chopped)"
4. "Who they Want (Screwed and Chopped)"
5. "On Yo Azz (Screwed and Chopped)"
6. "What Would You Do (Screwed and Chopped)"
7. "Pimp Drill (feat. Color Changin' Click) (Screwed and Chopped)"
8. "I Mean That There (Screwed and Chopped)"
9. "Run You Out the Game (Screwed and Chopped)"
10. "Switch Styles (Screwed and Chopped)"
11. "I Had a Dream (Screwed and Chopped)"
12. "O.G. Ron C Guttamix (Screwed and Chopped)"
13. "Body Rock (Screwed and Chopped)"
14. "We on Fire (feat. Color Changin' Click) (Screwed and Chopped)"
15. "You Got Wrecked (Screwed and Chopped)"
16. "Not Friendly (Screwed and Chopped)"
17. "Gun Smoke (Screwed and Chopped)"
18. "Answer Machine (Interlude) (feat. O.G. Ron C) (Screwed and Chopped)"

=== Disc 3 ===
1. "Front to Back (featuring Rasaq & Yung Ro)" - Instrumental from "Let Me See It" by UGK
2. "Who I Be (Rasaq)" - Instrumental from "Look What I Got" by T.I.
3. "Gun Smoke (featuring Yung Ro)" - Instrumental from "Hard Not 2 Kill" by Gangsta Boo
4. "We Gonna Ride (featuring Rasaq)" - Instrumental from "Badunkadunk" by Twista
5. "I Be Comin Down (Screwed) (Rasaq)" - Instrumental from "Don't Make" by 8Ball & MJG
6. "Call Some Hoes (featuring Kanye West & Stat Quo)"
7. "I Got Hoes (Screwed) (featuring Rasaq)"
8. "On Yo Azz"
9. "Texas Boys" (Rasaq)
10. "Hey Lady" (featuring Big Gem)
11. "Pimp Drill"
12. "Panky Rang (Interlude) (featuring Rasaq)"
13. "Hurtin 'em Bad"
14. "We on Fire (featuring Color Changin' Click)" - Instrumental from "On Fire" by Lloyd Banks
15. "I'm a Balla (featuring Play-N-Skillz, Far East & Lumba)"
16. "I Tip Down (featuring Rasaq)" - Instrumental from "Who Gives a Fuck Where You From" by Three 6 Mafia
17. "Who They Want (featuring Rasaq)" - Instrumental from "Game Over" by Lil' Flip
18. "Platinum Stars" (featuring Lil' Flip & Bun B)
19. "Tippin' Slow (featuring Rasaq)" - Instrumental from Round Here by Memphis Bleek
20. "Still Tippin" (featuring Slim Thug)
21. "Weatherman" (featuring Paul Wall)
