= Reignfall =

EP by Chamillionaire
- Released: July 23, 2013
- Recorded: 2013
- Genre: Hip hop
- Length: 26:44
- Label: Chamillitary
- Producer: Tyler Keyes, Trakksounds, Albie Dickson, Billion Beats, J Starz Music, The Beat Bullies

Chamillionaire chronology
| Elevate (2013) | Reignfall (2013) | Poison (2016) |

Reignfall is the third extended play by American rapper Chamillionaire released in promotion of his third studio album, Poison. The EP was released on July 23, 2013, by his record label Chamillitary Entertainment.

== Background ==
On January 17, 2013, Chamillionaire announced he would release various EP's in promotion of his third studio album Poison. The first he released was Ammunition on March 20, 2012. Second, he released Elevate and it was officially released on February 12, 2013. On July 22, 2013, he released the title track featuring Scarface, Killer Mike and Bobby Moon along with the track list.

== Track listing ==
| No. | Title | Producer(s) | Length |
|---|---|---|---|
| 1. | "Here We Go" | Tyler Keyes | 2:14 |
| 2. | "Keep Drivin'" | Trakksounds, Albie Dickson (co.) | 3:41 |
| 3. | "Go Get It" | Billion Beats | 4:43 |
| 4. | "Cloud 9" | Trakksounds | 3:58 |
| 5. | "Reign Fall" (featuring Scarface, Killer Mike and Bobby Moon) | J Starz Music | 4:24 |
| 6. | "Eatin'" | The Beat Bullies | 3:33 |
| 7. | "Here We Go Again" | Tyler Keyes | 4:11 |

== Charts ==
Reignfall was Chamillionaires first project since his second studio album Ultimate Victory to chart on a Billboard chart.

| Chart (2013) | Peak position |
|---|---|
| US Top R&B/Hip-Hop Albums (Billboard) | 40 |
| US Rap Albums (Billboard) | 24 |
