= Good Morning (Chamillionaire song) =

Single by Chamillionaire
- Released: October 13, 2009
- Recorded: 2009
- Genre: Pop-rap
- Length: 3:30 (album version)
- Label: Chamillitary, Universal Republic
- Songwriters: Hakeem Seriki; Justin Franks; Jeffrey Lynne; Dwight Watson; Ericka Watson; Thomas Earl Petty
- Producer: DJ Frank E

Chamillionaire singles chronology
"The Evening News" (2007)	"Good Morning" (2009)	"The Main Event" (2011)

"Good Morning" is a song by American rapper Chamillionaire, released by Universal Republic Records on October 13, 2009 as the lead single from his cancelled third studio album, Venom. Production of the track was handled by DJ Frank E, who heavily sampled Tom Petty's 1989 song "Free Fallin'".

"Good Morning" debuted and peaked at number 40 on the Billboard Hot 100 chart, and an accompanying music video was released on November 10, 2009.

== Track listing ==
Digital Single

No.	Title	Writer(s)	Length
1.	"Good Morning"	Hakeem Seriki, Justin Franks, Jeffrey Lynne, Dwight Watson, Ericka Watson Thomas Earl Petty	3:30

== Chart positions ==
Chart (2009)	Peak position
Canada Hot 100 (Billboard)	78
US Billboard Hot 100	40
US Rhythmic Airplay (Billboard)	36

== Release history ==
Release dates and formats for "Good Morning"
Region	Date	Format	Label(s)	Ref.
United States	November 10, 2009	Mainstream airplay	Universal Republic	
