= Controversy Sells =

Studio album by Paul Wall and Chamillionaire
- Released: January 25, 2005
- Recorded: 2003–2004
- Studio: Crazy's House Recording Studios
- Genre: Hip-hop
- Length: 55:26
- Label: Paid In Full
- Producer: Mista Madd (exec.); Myron "Big Catty" Wright (exec.); Beatco; Blue Note; Crazy C; Del; Drathoven; T-Gray; Whyle Chyle

Paul Wall and Chamillionaire chronology
Get Ya Mind Correct (2002)	Controversy Sells (2005)

Paul Wall chronology
Chick Magnet (2004)	Controversy Sells (2005)	The Peoples Champ (2005)

Chamillionaire chronology
Get Ya Mind Correct (2002)	Controversy Sells (2005)	The Sound of Revenge (2005)

Professional ratings
Review scores
Source	Rating
AllMusic	2.5/5 stars
RapReviews	7/10

Controversy Sells is the second and final collaborative studio album by American rappers Paul Wall and Chamillionaire. It was released on January 25, 2005 via Paid in Full Entertainment after both artists had left the label. Recording sessions took place at Crazy's House Recording Studios in Texas. Production was handled by Blue Note, Del, Crazy C, Beatco, Drathoven, T-Gray and Whyle Chyle, with Mista Madd and Myron Wright serving as executive producers. It features guest appearances from 50/50 Twin, Lew Hawk, Devin the Dude, Lil' Flip, Monetana and Yung Ro.

In the United States, the album peaked at number 50 on the Top R&B/Hip-Hop Albums and number 30 on the Independent Albums charts. A 'Chopped & Skrewed' version was done by Swishahouse's DJ Michael '5000' Watts.

== Track listing ==
No.	Title	Producer(s)	Length
1.	"Intro"		1:58
2.	"Clap"	Drathoven	3:33
3.	"Still (N Luv Wit My Money)" (featuring 50/50 Twin)	Crazy C.	6:45
4.	"Here I Am"	Beatco	2:13
5.	"I Got Game"	Bluenote	4:05
6.	"True" (featuring Lil' Flip)	Del	4:05
7.	"Respect My Grind"	Crazy C.	2:51
8.	"Lawyer Fees"		0:17
9.	"Can't Give Up the World" (featuring 50/50 Twin and Lew Hawk)	Del	5:07
10.	"What Would U Do" (featuring Monetana)	Bluenote	3:35
11.	"Back Up Plan" (featuring Devin the Dude)	Whyle Chyle	6:17
12.	"She Gangsta"	T-Gray	4:40
13.	"House of Pain" (featuring Yung Ro)	Bluenote	3:28
14.	"True (Remix)" (featuring 50/50 Twin and Lew Hawk)	Del	4:07
15.	"Outro"		2:25
Total length:			55:26

== Charts ==
Chart (2005)	Peak position
US Top R&B/Hip-Hop Albums (Billboard)	50
US Independent Albums (Billboard)	30
