= Tony Henry (singer) =

English opera singer

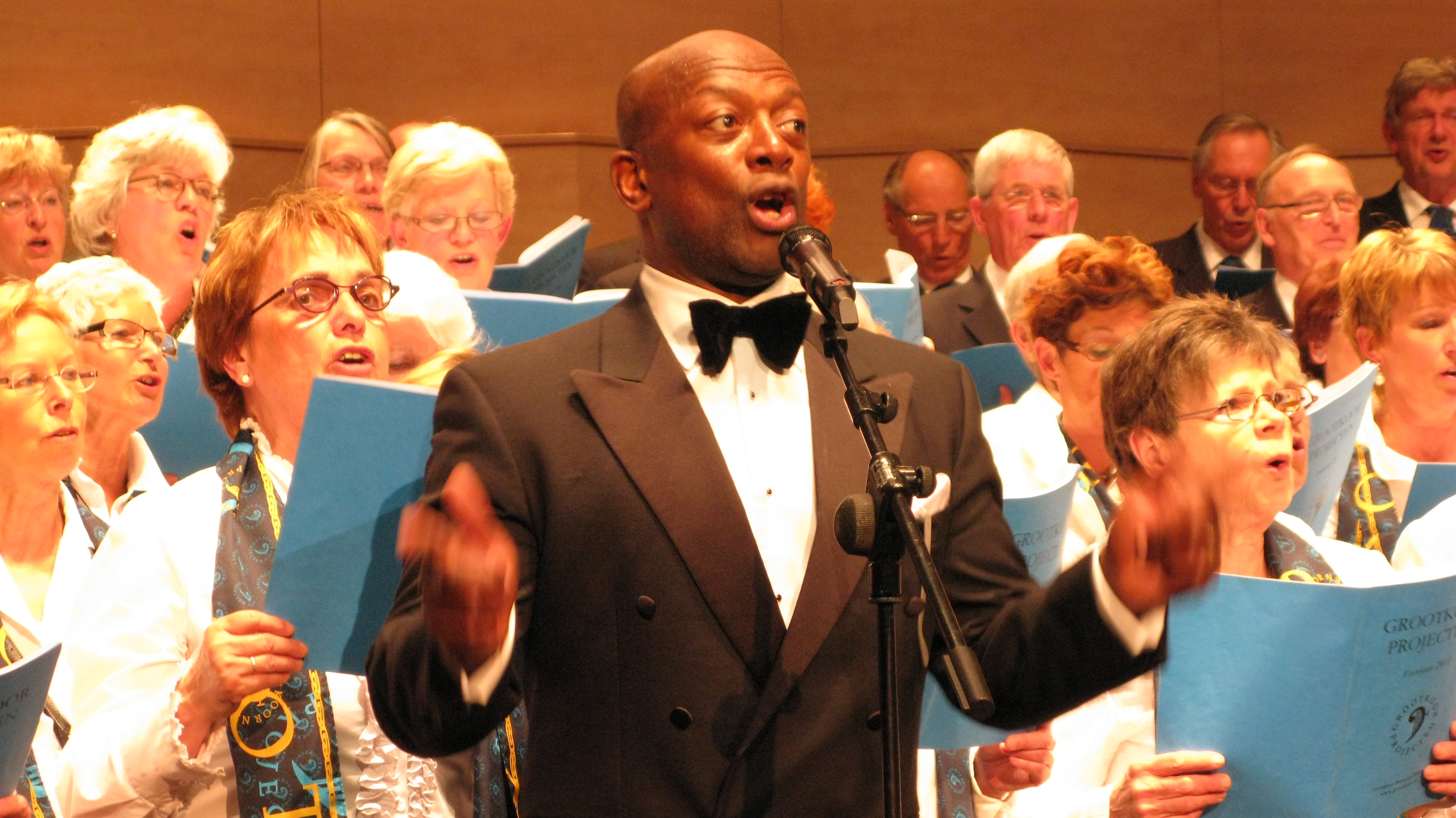
Henry in 2011

Antony Garfield "Tony" Henry is an English opera singer from St Albans, Hertfordshire, England.

== Personal life ==
Henry was the third of five children. His parents are Ghanaian by birth. As a child, he often had to get clothes from the charity Barnardo's. During his childhood, his siblings were often involved with the police, with one going to prison for grievous bodily harm. When he was 17, Henry was accepted into the Central School of Ballet and worked for a builder while also learning opera. Henry moved to London when he attended the Central School of Ballet, but later moved to Inverness, Scotland.

== Career ==
Outside of ballet, Henry started doing stunt work which included work on The Bill. Henry later realized that he "wasn't a very good stunt man" and later changed perform for five years in Starlight Express in the West End of London. During a performance of Carmen Jones with The Old Vic, professional opera singers encouraged Henry to focus on opera because "he had a voice to die for". He later appeared in Madama Butterfly at the Royal Albert Hall and at the Covent Garden restaurant Sarastro. While at Sarastro, producers from Warner Music UK signed him for their label. They also encouraged Henry to perform opera combined with hip hop. He was compared as a combination of Luciano Pavarotti and Puff Daddy.

=== Football ===
Henry has also performed before association football matches. In 2003 he performed "Abide with Me" before the 2003 FA Cup Final at the Millennium Stadium. Arsenal fans were impressed with his performance and nicknamed him the "Voice of Arsenal". In 2007, Henry sang the Croatian national anthem, "Lijepa naša domovino" before Croatia's match against the England national football team at Wembley Stadium. During the performance, Henry made a mistake with the lyrics. Henry was supposed to sing "Mila kuda si planina" ("My dear, how we love your mountains"), instead he sang "Mila kura si planina" ("My dear, my penis is a mountain"). Henry apologized for the mistake, however Croatian fans considered him a lucky omen as they felt that his mistake helped the players relax as they were seen laughing after it. They also petitioned the Croatian Football Federation to hire Henry as an official mascot and for him to sing at their games at UEFA Euro 2008.

== Album ==
In 2003, Henry released the album Modern Arias. Sales of the album were slow at first, but by 2006, it reached #37 in the Belgian Albums Chart. It was released under the label Chamilitary, founded by businessman and rapper Chamillionaire.
