= Mixtape Messiah 3 =

Mixtape by Chamillionaire
- Released: July 18, 2007
- Recorded: 2006–2007
- Genre: Southern rap, hip hop
- Label: Chamillitary / Universal Records

Chamillionaire chronology
Mixtape Messiah 2 (2006)	Mixtape Messiah 3 (2007)	Mixtape Messiah 4 (2008)

Professional ratings
Review scores
Source	Rating
AllHipHop	3.5/5 stars
DJBooth.net	3/5 stars
The New York Times	(mixed)
Rap Reviews	(9/10)

Mixtape Messiah 3 is a mixtape by southern rapper Chamillionaire. This is the third in the Mixtape Messiah It was released as a free download on Chamillionaire's website on July 18, 2007 at 11 p.m. EDT to promote his album Ultimate Victory, then scheduled for release three months later. The free The Mixtape Messiah DVD, a compilation of interviews, show performances, backstage tour footage, and in-studio footage, was released at the same time.

== Track listing ==
#	Title	Producer(s)	Note(s)	Time
1	"Get Ya Burners Out"	Play-n-Skillz	Original Production	3:52
2	"Money Already Made"	Apex	Instrumental from: 50 Cent - I Get Money	3:18
3	"Get On My Level"	Timbaland	Instrumental from: Fabolous - Make Me Better	3:04
4	"Living Good"	Scott Storch	Instrumental from: Brisco - I'm In Tha Hood	2:22
5	"It's Just Pain"	Eminem	Instrumental from: Jay-Z - Renegade	2:37
6	"The Call"	Eminem	Instrumental from: Jay-Z - Renegade	1:00
7	"Nothin' But Lies"	Kanye West, DJ Toomp	Instrumental from: Kanye West - Can't Tell Me Nothing	3:27
8	"Ima Playa FaSho"	DJ Paul & Juicy J	Instrumental from: UGK - International Player's Anthem (I Choose You)	2:48
9	"Roy Wood Jr Pt. 1"			1:54
10	"Failure's Not an Option"	Mannie Fresh	Instrumental from: T.I. - Big Shit Poppin' (Do It)	2:17
11	"Got a Lot of Options"	Kane Beatz	Instrumental from: Trick Daddy - Tuck Ya Ice	3:02
12	"See It in My Eyes"	Mr. Lee	Instrumental from: Lil' Keke - I'm a G	3:24
13	"Don't Hurt 'Em Hammer"	Kanye West	Instrumental from: Common - The People	4:25
14	"Roy Woods Jr skit Pt. 2"	Kanye West	Instrumental from: Common - The People	0:56
15	"It's On"	Mouse	Instrumental from: Foxx - Wipe Me Down	3:40
16	"You a Dummy"	Scott Storch	Instrumental from: Birdman & Lil' Wayne - You Ain't Know	2:43
17	"Chamillionaire Speaks"	Scott Storch	Instrumental from: Birdman & Lil' Wayne - You Ain't Know	1:41
18	"Mo Scrilla"	The Runners	Instrumental from: Young Jeezy - Go Getta	2:02
19	"The Crowd Goes Wild"	David Banner, Deezle, Akon	Instrumental from: David Banner - 9mm	2:36
20	"Makes Me Stronger"	Kanye West	Instrumental from: Kanye West - Stronger	2:28
21	"Chamillionaire Speaks 2"	Kanye West	Instrumental from: Kanye West - Stronger	1:18
22	"Rain"	Chink Santana, Broken Equipment Productions	Instrumental from: Jim Jones - Emotionless	3:27
