= Ammunition (Chamillionaire EP) =

EP by Chamillionaire
- Released: March 20, 2012 (digital download); March 27, 2012 (CD)
- Recorded: 2011–12
- Genre: Hip hop
- Length: 35:01
- Label: Chamillitary
- Producer: CyFyre, CarM.I.L., DJ Rapid Ric, The Beat Bullies, Sweatbox Productions, Vman Productions, Tyler Keyes

Chamillionaire chronology
Ultimate Victory (2007)	Ammunition (2012)	Elevate (2013)

Professional ratings
Review scores
Source	Rating
HipHopDX	4/5 stars
XXL	(XL)

Ammunition is an EP by American rapper Chamillionaire. It was released on March 20, 2012, by Chamillitary Entertainment. Ammunition is Chamillionaire's first major album release since his second studio album, Ultimate Victory (2007). With production handled by The Beat Bullies, and CyFyre, among others, and collaborated with artists such as Angel, Saigon and Marcus Manchild.

The album generally received positive reviews from music critics. In order to promote the album, Chamillionaire released a freestyle over Rick Ross's Stay Schemin' before the album's release.

== Track listing ==
Digital version
No.	Title	Producer(s)	Length
1.	"Your Connect"	Cy Fyre	1:17
2.	"Running Laps"	Cy Fyre	4:35
3.	"Let's Get That"	CarM.I.L.	3:41
4.	"All Mine"	DJ Rapid Ric	3:26
5.	"On My Way" (featuring Lee-Lonn)	The Beat Bullies	4:40
6.	"You Gon Learn" (featuring Saigon)	Sweatbox Productions	4:21
7.	"Let's Get That (Remix)" (featuring Doughbeezy & Marcus Manchild)	CarM.I.L.	4:17
8.	"Won't Change" (featuring Tami LaTrell)	Vman Productions	4:24
9.	"Never Enough" (featuring Angel Faith)	Tyler Keyes	4:15

Physical version
No.	Title	Producer(s)	Length
1.	"Your Connect"	Cy Fyre	1:17
2.	"Running Laps"	Cy Fyre	4:35
3.	"You Gon Learn (Early Service)" (featuring Saigon)	Sweatbox Productions	4:18
4.	"All Mine"	DJ Rapid Ric	3:26
5.	"On My Way" (featuring Lee-Lonn)	The Beat Bullies	4:40
6.	"Let's Get That"	CarM.I.L.	3:41
7.	"Won't Change" (featuring Tami LaTrell)	Vman Productions	4:24
8.	"You Gon Learn (Late Service)"	Sweatbox Productions	2:38
9.	"Never Enough" (featuring Angel Faith)	Tyler Keyes	4:15

Sample credits

- "All Mine" contains elements of "Hetki Lyö" as performed by Kirka.
