= Madd Hatta =

- Also known as: Mista Madd
- Born: Benjamin Thompson III
- Origin: Houston, Texas, U.S.
- Genres: Hip hop
- Occupations: Radio personality; rapper; record producer
- Years active: 1994–present
- Labels: Groove Makers; Paid In Full

Benjamin Thompson, professionally known as Madd Hatta and Mista Madd, is an American rapper and record producer from Houston, Texas. He is the owner of Paid in Full Entertainment and the former host of the Houston-based radio talk show Madd Hatta Morning Show on 97.9 The Box. He's currently curating Klassic Joints a 24/7-365 digital streaming app that plays classic Hip-hop and Super Throwback Party which is a 24/7-365 free digital streaming app that plays the best of the 90's-2000's hip-hop and R&B.

== Discography ==
Albums

- 1995 – All About Me
- 1995 – Serious
- 1997 – The pH Factor
- 1999 – Mista Madd & The Supa Thuggz
- 2000 – Can I Live?
- 2007 – Still Standing
