= Mixtape Messiah 7 =

Mixtape by Chamillionaire
- Released: August 4, 2009
- Recorded: 2008–2009
- Genre: Southern rap, hip hop
- Label: Chamillitary

Chamillionaire chronology
| Mixtape Messiah 6 (2009) | Mixtape Messiah 7 (2009) |

Mixtape Messiah 7 is a mixtape by southern rapper Chamillionaire. It is also the final mixtape in the Mixtape Messiah series. Disc 1 was mixed by Michael "5000" Watts and disc 2 was mixed by Rapic Ric. Chamillionaire later released a chopped and screwed version of various tracks from the album (disc 3), and also a regular speed version of the chopped and screwed CD (disc 4).

== Release ==
On his official website, Mixtape Messiah 7 disc one was released on August 4, 2009. The second and third discs were released on August 6, and the final disc on August 7.

100 physical copies of the mixtape were given away to fans, these included Chamillionaire's signature, a 12-page booklet of artwork, and a $100 bill. Chamillionaire auctioned two of these copies on eBay, with all proceeds going to No More Victims, a Houston organization that gives aid to children of incarcerated parents.

== Track listing ==
Disc one (mixed by Chamillionaire)
| No. | Title | Instrumental | Length |
|---|---|---|---|
| 1. | "The Final Chapter" | None | 0:21 |
| 2. | "Famous" (feat. Famous) | Mean Streets by Raekwon | 3:44 |
| 3. | "Internet Thugs Attack" | Summer in the City by Wax and EOM | 4:09 |
| 4. | "100 Million" | 100 Million by Birdman | 3:27 |
| 5. | "Best She Ever Had" | Best I Ever Had by Drake | 3:10 |
| 6. | "Breathe" | Breathe by Fabolous | 1:56 |
| 7. | "I Know Ya Mad" (feat. Bun B) | None | 4:18 |
| 8. | "Denzel Washington" (feat. Z-Ro) | None | 4:19 |
| 9. | "Day Dream" | Daydreamin' by Lupe Fiasco | 1:47 |
| 10. | "Jewelry Skit" | None | 2:28 |
| 11. | "Gucci & Fendi" | None | 4:02 |
| 12. | "Playa Status" | Uptown by Drake | 4:34 |
| 13. | "This Morning" | Dis Mornin by Rocko | 2:21 |
| 14. | "Coming Down Candy (prod. by Million Dollar Beatz)" | Comin Down Candy by UGK | 1:26 |
| 15. | "Solo" (feat. Crooked I) | Creepin' (Solo) by Chamillionaire | 2:35 |
| 16. | "The One" | Public Service Announcement by Jay-Z | 2:33 |
| 17. | "Still Hustlin" | Love Me by 112 | 1:47 |
| 18. | "Bike Repo Skit" | Love Me by 112 | 2:29 |
| 19. | "Scratch That" | Chillin by Wale | 1:58 |
| 20. | "Dead Presidents" | Dead Presidents II by Jay-Z | 3:14 |
| 21. | "Successful" | Successful by Drake | 2:36 |
| 22. | "On My Grind" | Day 'n' Nite by Kid Cudi | 1:45 |
| 23. | "Lonely at the Top" | Let's Get This Paper – Rich Boy | 4:37 |
| 24. | "Life Goes On" (feat. Tony Henry) | None | 4:41 |
| 25. | "Say Goodbye" | None | 4:45 |
| 26. | "For the Money Outro" | Money by The Game | 4:52 |
| Total length: | | | 79:54 |

Disc two (mixed by DJ Rapid Ric)
| No. | Title | Instrumental | Length |
|---|---|---|---|
| 1. | "The Final Chapter 2" | None | 1:55 |
| 2. | "Still Getting Money" | Plenty Money by Plies | 1:51 |
| 3. | "In My City Mayne" | In My City by Killer Mike | 2:32 |
| 4. | "Big Deal" | Kinda Like A Big Deal by Clipse | 1:48 |
| 5. | "I'm 2 Good" | I Look Good by Chalie Boy | 1:48 |
| 6. | "How We Do It" | You Know How We Do It by Ice Cube | 2:15 |
| 7. | "The Realeast Eva" | Fresh by 6 Tre Gangsta and Lil' Boosie | 1:54 |
| 8. | "Ain't Nobody" | Kim Kardashian by Lil' Flip | 2:02 |
| 9. | "King Of Tomorrow" | King of Sorrow by Sade | 3:52 |
| 10. | "City Lights" | City Lights by Method Man & Redman | 1:57 |
| 11. | "Just Smile" | Smile by Scarface | 3:04 |
| 12. | "Final Story" | Gangsta Rap Made Me Do It by Ice Cube | 4:16 |
| 13. | "I'm On It (Bonus Track)" | None | 4:42 |
| Total length: | | | 33:56 |

Disc three (mixed by DJ Michael '5000' Watts)
| No. | Title | Instrumental | Length |
|---|---|---|---|
| 1. | "Denzel Washington (Watts Regular)" | None | 4:53 |
| 2. | "Best She Ever Had (Watts Regular)" | Best I Ever Had by Drake | 3:16 |
| 3. | "Old School Break (Watts Regular)" | None | 0:23 |
| 4. | "Internet Thugs Attack (Watts Regular)" | Summer in the City by Wax and E.O.M | 3:35 |
| 5. | "Day Dream (Watts Regular)" | Daydreamin' by Lupe Fiasco | 1:44 |
| 6. | "Jewelry Skit (Watts Regular)" | None | 2:28 |
| 7. | "Famous (Watts Regular)" (feat. Famous) | None | 4:07 |
| 8. | "Breathe (Watts Regular)" | Breathe by Fabolous | 2:11 |
| 9. | "Mixtape Madoff (Watts Regular)" | Get To Poppin' by Rich Boy | 2:05 |
| 10. | "Dead Presidents (Watts Regular)" | Dead Presidents II by Jay-Z | 2:40 |
| 11. | "The One (Watts Regular)" | Public Service Announcement by Jay-Z | 2:57 |
| 12. | "Life Goes On (Watts Regular)" (feat. Tony Henry) | None | 4:24 |
| 13. | "Scratch That Outro (Watts Regular)" | Chillin by Wale | 2:12 |
| Total length: | | | 36:55 |

Disc four (chopped & screwed by DJ Michael '5000' Watts)
| No. | Title | Instrumental | Length |
|---|---|---|---|
| 1. | "Denzel Washington (Watts Screwed)" | None | 4:53 |
| 2. | "Best She Ever Had (Watts Screwed)" | Best I Ever Had by Drake | 3:16 |
| 3. | "Old School Break (Watts Screwed)" | None | 0:23 |
| 4. | "Internet Thugs Attack (Watts Screwed)" | Summer in the City by Wax and E.O.M | 3:35 |
| 5. | "Day Dream (Watts Screwed)" | Daydreamin' by Lupe Fiasco | 1:44 |
| 6. | "Jewelry Skit (Watts Screwed)" | None | 2:28 |
| 7. | "Famous (Watts Screwed)" (feat. Famous) | None | 4:07 |
| 8. | "Breathe (Watts Screwed)" | Breathe by Fabolous | 2:11 |
| 9. | "Mixtape Madoff (Watts Screwed)" | Get To Poppin' by Rich Boy | 2:05 |
| 10. | "Dead Presidents (Watts Screwed)" | Dead Presidents II by Jay-Z | 2:40 |
| 11. | "Break (Watts Screwed)" | None | 0:34 |
| 12. | "The One (Watts Screwed)" | Public Service Announcement by Jay-Z | 2:57 |
| 13. | "Life Goes On (Watts Screwed)" (feat. Tony Henry) | None | 4:24 |
| 14. | "Scratch That Outro (Watts Screwed)" | Chillin by Wale | 2:12 |
| Total length: | | | 37:29 |
