= Trap Starz Clik =

American hip hop group

- Origin: Dallas, Texas, United States
- Genres: Southern hip hop Snap music
- Years active: 2007-present
- Labels: Universal Republic
- Members: Lil High; Pacman; YT

Trap Starz Clik is a rap group from Dallas, Texas, United States, composed of Lil High, Pacman and YT. Two of the Trap Starz Lil High, and Pacman attended Nimitz High School (Irving, Texas) and both graduated in 2005. While YT attend many Dallas schools, he is from (West Dallas, Texas). Their debut album, Hood Depot, was released in February 2008 on Universal Republic Records; its lead-off single, "Get It Big", has charted on the Billboard Hot R&B/Hip-Hop Songs charts.

Year	Single	US Hot R&B/Hip-Hop	US Rhythmic	US Rap	Album
2007	"Get It Big"	54	35	25	Hood Depot
