= Hip Hop Police =

Single by Chamillionaire featuring Slick Rick

from the album Ultimate Victory
- Released: July 21, 2007
- Recorded: 2007
- Genre: Hip hop
- Length: 4:11
- Label: Chamillitary, Universal
- Songwriters: Hakeem Seriki, Richard Walters
- Producer: J. R. Rotem

Chamillionaire singles chronology
"Doe Boy Fresh" (2007)	"Hip Hop Police" (2007)	"Creepin' (Solo)" (2008)

Slick Rick singles chronology
"Street Talkin'" (1999)	"Hip Hop Police" (2007)

"Hip Hop Police" is a song written and performed by Chamillionaire and Slick Rick. It was produced by J. R. Rotem and released as the first single of Chamillionaire's second album, Ultimate Victory.

== Background ==
The clean version of the song leaked to the internet on June 21, 2007. Shortly after the clean version leaked, the explicit version leaked as well. (Chamillionaire uses no vulgarities, but various other words of his are censored out of the edited version, including "gun" and controlled substance references, along with some titles of songs and albums. While the video censors album covers of other rappers.) Chamillionaire described the track by saying, The "Hip Hop Police" record is like a "Murder Was the Case" record. It's really a concept record. ... Most records now are dance records or for the club. It's so much of that, I need to go a different direction. I think that's why I decided to come with "Hip Hop Police."

It's automatically different because Slick Rick and Chamillionaire, that's automatically gonna raise eyebrows," ... "Slick Rick has always been one of those guys real good at telling stories. That's what we're doing ... telling a story about a murder. The metaphor means, nowadays, just loving hip-hop and being a rapper and loving music is the same as committing a murder. ... With all the controversy surrounding rap, that's what the record is about.

— Chamillionaire, in a 2007 MTV interview.

The song officially was released through Chamillionaire's MySpace page at June 22, 2007.

The song was available for download on iTunes as of July 10, 2007, and has since sold over 2,679,000 copies.

== Paraphrases ==
The song paraphrases lines from:

- Snoop Dogg's song "Gin & Juice," which Snoop says "With so much drama in the LBC / It's kinda hard bein Snoop D-O-Double-G", which in the chorus of "Hip Hop Police," Chamillionaire says "With so much drama in the industry / Hip hop police are listenin'".
- In the chorus, Chamillionaire says "Murder Was the Case", which is a reference to the Snoop Dogg song "Murder Was the Case". In the song, Snoop Dogg says "Murder was the case that they gave me", and Chamillionaire says "Murder was the case and they blamed me" in a similar fashion.
- Slick Rick's own song "Children's Story" was sampled during Slick Rick's part of the song, although the sample was uncredited.

== Music video ==
The music video for "Hip Hop Police" premiered on BET's 106 & Park on July 27, 2007. On September 19, the video debuted on 106 & Park at number-ten and later peaked at number-eight on the series. On December 31 of the same year, the video appeared at number 85 on the network's Notarized: Top 100 Videos of 2007 countdown.

The video begins with Chamillionaire standing on a sidewalk with Famous when two detectives pull up in an unmarked police vehicle. A detective (played by Chamillionaire) proceeds to interrogate Chamillionaire about his doings in that location, and how he is able to afford so much jewelry. He also asks Chamillionaire (pronounces it as "CHA" instead of "KA") how his next album will be compared to his last one. Chamillionaire answers by saying "Bigger." and the detective pretends to mishear him and claims that Chamillionaire called a racial slur. Chamillionaire denies it and is defiant, and as the detective attempts to arrest him, he begins running. The detective, his partner and numerous police officers catch up to Chamillionaire. He is arrested while the detective continues to taunt him. At the police station, Chamillionaire is further interrogated as to what he is doing and with whom he is associating. But Chamillionaire refuses to give any information. Although Chamillionaire claims that he has done nothing wrong, the police insist that he is guilty of "hip-hop crimes" (in this case, meaning freedom of expression). Chamillionaire is put in a police lineup with Slick Rick who is being interrogated by another detective (also played by Slick Rick).

Throughout the video, an anchorman (also played by Chamillionaire) named Bob O'Wildy, a parody of Bill O'Reilly and is in whiteface, reports a nationwide crackdown on rappers and anything associated with hip-hop due to Chamillionaire's usage of "The N word". In the final shot, a news graphic reports Chamillionaire has been sentenced while the news ticker reports "Without hip-hop, white teenagers are now listening to hardcore polka". With a smile, Bob O'Wildy reports "Hip-hop is officially dead." referring to Nas' album Hip Hop Is Dead.

Another version featured this video followed by the video for the track "The Evening News."

It was the first Chamillionaire and Slick Rick song to receive airplay on Radio Disney, and also the first song featuring the subject of crime on the children station. Although Radio Disney has edited one portion of the song, the part when Chamilionaire says "Hell Yeah", instead he says "Heck Yeah."

== Chart positions ==
Chart (2007)	Peak Position
Germany (Official German Charts)	46
New Zealand (Recorded Music NZ)	34
Sweden (Sverigetopplistan)	45
UK Singles (Official Charts Company)	50
US Billboard Bubbling Under Hot 100 Singles	1
US Billboard Hot R&B/Hip-Hop Songs	76

Region	Certification	Certified units/sales
Denmark (IFPI Danmark)	Gold	45,000^{‡}
^{‡} Sales+streaming figures based on certification alone.
