= Get Ya Mind Correct =

Studio album by Paul Wall & Chamillionaire
- Released: June 25, 2002
- Recorded: 2001–2002
- Genre: Southern hip hop
- Length: 52:48
- Label: Paid In Full
- Producer: Mista Madd (exec.); Myron "Big Catty" Wright (exec.); Drathoven; Marcus Ecby; Lee; Bluenote; Bruce Takara; Pretty Todd; Deep Fired Camp; Hakeem Seriki

Paul Wall & Chamillionaire chronology
| Get Ya Mind Correct (2002) | Controversy Sells (2005) |

Professional ratings
Review scores
| Source | Rating |
|---|---|
| Allmusic | link |
| RapReviews.com | link |

Get Ya Mind Correct is the debut collaborative studio album by American rappers Paul Wall and Chamillionaire of The Color Changin' Click, released when they were both on the Paid In Full Label. It was notable in the Houston underground rap scene. The album peaked at #67 on the BillboardTop R&B/Hip-Hop Albums chart. The album was nominated for Indie Album of the Year in The Source magazine.

DJ Michael '5000' Watts released a chopped and screwed version of the album through Swishahouse.

== Track listing ==
| No. | Title | Producer(s) | Length |
|---|---|---|---|
| 1. | "My Money Gets Jealous" | Drathoven | 3:37 |
| 2. | "N Luv Wit My Money" | Lee | 4:15 |
| 3. | "Thinkin' Thoed" (featuring Lew Hawk) | Bluenote | 3:46 |
| 4. | "Skit" | -- | 0:58 |
| 5. | "Falsifying" | Bruce Takara | 4:17 |
| 6. | "U Owe Me" | Pretty Todd | 3:21 |
| 7. | "Skit" | -- | 0:08 |
| 8. | "The Other Day" | Bluenote | 4:11 |
| 9. | "Game Over" | Bluenote | 4:10 |
| 10. | "I Wanna Get" (featuring Heather Nicole) | Bluenote | 3:27 |
| 11. | "Balla Talk II" | Deep Fried Camp | 4:20 |
| 12. | "Go Grind" | Drathoven | 4:03 |
| 13. | "Skit" | -- | 0:26 |
| 14. | "Luv N My Life" | Drathoven | 3:27 |
| 15. | "U Already Know" (featuring 50/50 Twin) | Drathoven | 3:26 |
| 16. | "Play Dirty" (featuring 50/50 Twin) | Bluenote | 4:04 |
| 17. | "Outro" | -- | 0:22 |
