= Elevate (EP) =

EP by Chamillionaire
- Released: February 12, 2013
- Recorded: 2012
- Genre: Hip hop
- Length: 26:57
- Label: Chamillitary
- Producer: J Glaze, Natural Disaster, Oli Smallz, Trakksounds, Tyler Keyes

Chamillionaire chronology
Ammunition (2012)	Elevate (2013)	Reignfall (2013)

Elevate is the second extended play released by American rapper Chamillionaire in promotion of his third studio album, Poison. It was released on February 12, 2013 by his label Chamillitary Entertainment.

== Background ==
On January 17, 2013 Chamillionaire announced he would release various EP's in promotion of his third studio album Poison. The first being Ammunition, followed by Elevate and that it would release on February 12 via his personal website, chamillionaire.com. The album artwork would be revealed the following day. The EP will feature seven songs. On January 23, 2013 Chamillionaire revealed the EP would feature no guest appearances at all.

== Release and promotion ==
Chamillionaire only released 1,000 hard copies of the EP, which sold out within 10 hours of the January 17th announcement. However it was still available for digital download. He performed at Club Chrome in Ft. Worth, Texas on February 23, 2013 for the Elevate release party.

== Critical reception ==
Professional ratings
Review scores
Source	Rating
RedEye	1.5/4 stars

Elevate was met with generally mixed reviews. Adam Lukach of RedEye said, "While the production sounds great and Chamillionaire shows he can still flash a little rhythm, the whole thing sounds circa his 2006 prime. It doesn't help that he reminds listeners about it. "Overnight" and "Hold Up" try to force him into the present, but Chamillionaire can't stop looking over his shoulder."

== Track listing ==
Digital Version
No.	Title	Producer(s)	Length
1.	"Elevate"	Tyler Keyes	3:13
2.	"Hold Up"	Natural Disaster	3:36
3.	"Slow Loud & Bangin"	Oli Smallz	4:14
4.	"Overnight"	Trakksounds	4:23
5.	"Bet You Won’t"	Oli Smallz	3:36
6.	"Emotional"	J Glaze	4:10
7.	"Bullet Proof"	Oli Smallz	2:59

Physical Version
No.	Title	Producer(s)	Length
1.	"Elevate"	Tyler Keyes	3:13
2.	"Bet You Won’t"	Oli Smallz	3:36
3.	"Slow Loud & Bangin"	Oli Smallz	4:14
4.	"Overnight"	Trakksounds	4:23
5.	"Bullet Proof"	Oli Smallz	2:59
6.	"Emotional"	J Glaze	4:10
7.	"See Through"	Trakksounds	3:10
