= Mixtape Messiah 4 =

Mixtape by Chamillionaire
- Released: 2008
- Genre: Hip hop
- Label: Chamillitary / Universal Records

Chamillionaire chronology
Mixtape Messiah 3 (2007)	Mixtape Messiah 4 (2008)	Mixtape Messiah 5 (2008)

Mixtape Messiah 4 is the fourth mixtape by American rapper Chamillionaire in his Mixtape Messiah series. It is a two-disc set that was released on August 27, 2008.

== Track listing ==
=== (Disc 1) ===
#	Title	Artist(s)	Note(s)	Time
1	"The Horror Flick (Intro)"	Chamillionaire		4:01
2	"Go Hard"	Chamillionaire	Instrumental from: Clipse - 20k Money Making Brothers on the Corner	5:10
3	"Fire Drill"	Chamillionaire	Instrumental from: B.G. - For A Minute	1:09
4	"Roll Call Reloaded"	Chamillionaire	Instrumental from: B.G. – For A Minute	5:09
5	"The Real Thang"	Chamillionaire	Instrumental from: Busta Rhymes featuring Linkin Park - We Made It	3:57
6	"All Around The World"	Chamillionaire	Instrumental from: Lloyd - Girls Around the World	4:22
7	"Do It For H-Town"	Chamillionaire feat. Slim Thug & Trae	Instrumental from: Bun B - You're Everything	5:55
8	"Skit 1 (Roy Wood Jr.)"	Chamillionaire	Instrumental from: Pimp C - Pussy Nigga Anthum	1:26
9	"Internet Nerds Revenge"	Chamillionaire	Instrumental from: Three 6 Mafia - Suga Daddy	3:40
10	"Fire"	Chamillionaire feat. Famous	Instrumental from: UNK -Hit The Dance Floor	3:26
11	"Hero"	Chamillionaire	Instrumental from: Nas - Hero	4:02
12	"My Dream"	Chamillionaire feat. Akon	Instrumental from: Crooked I - Dream Big	4:20
13	"Bay Area Skit"	Chamillionaire feat. Guce & Emcee T	Instrumental from:	0:47
14	"Gotta Be Playa"	Chamillionaire feat. Famous	Instrumental from:	4:45
15	"Not Your Baby"	Chamillionaire feat. Ms Crys J	Instrumental from: LL Cool J - Baby	1:02
16	"Answer Machine 3"	Chamillionaire feat. Ms Crys J	Instrumental from: LL Cool J - Baby	3:28
17	"The Greatest"	Chamillionaire	Instrumental from: Lupe Fiasco - Kick, Push	2:11
18	"Skit 2 (Roy Wood Jr.) "	Chamillionaire	Instrumental from: Lupe Fiasco - Kick, Push	1:33
19	"On The Grind Homie"	Chamillionaire	Instrumental from: Shawty Lo - Foolish	3:59
20	"My Life"	Chamillionaire feat. Trae & Slim Thug	Instrumental from: The Game - My Life	5:34
21	"Middle Finger Up"	Chamillionaire	Instrumental from: Usher - Moving Mountains	3:53

=== (Disc 2) ===
#	Title	Artist(s)	Note(s)	Time
1	"What The Business Is"	Chamillionaire	Instrumental from: Jay-Z - Blue Magic	3:19
2	"Who Hotter Than Me"	Chamillionaire feat. Famous	Instrumental from: Plies – Who Hotter Than Me	3:18
3	"Lovin’ What You See"	Chamillionaire	Instrumental from: Blood Raw - 26 Inches	3:00
4	"Cadillac & Benz"	Killa Kyleon feat. Chamillionaire	Instrumental from: Royce – Cadillac N Benz	3:29
5	"Put On For Houston"	Chamillionaire	Instrumental from: Young Jeezy – Put On	4:03
6	"She’s Watching Me Skit"	Chamillionaire	Instrumental from:	0:24
7	"I’d Rather Get Some Bread"	Chamillionaire	Instrumental from: Three 6 Mafia – I’d Rather	3:49
8	"Fire Drill Skill"	Chamillionaire	Instrumental from: BG – For A Minute	0:56
9	"Flow So Sick"	Killa Kyleon	Instrumental from: Nelly - Party People	0:51
10	"Top Down Money Up"	Chamillionaire	Instrumental from: Shawty Lo - Foolish	3:43
11	"Block On Smash"	Chamillionaire	Instrumental from:	2:56
12	"Never"	Chamillionaire feat. Killer Mike	Instrumental from: Scarface - Never	2:00
13	"Diamonds Exposed Break"	Chamillionaire	Instrumental from: Paul Wall - Diamonds Exposed	3:31
14	"2 Real"	Lil' Flip feat. Chamillionaire		4:25
15	"2 MPH"	Mistah Fab feat. Bun B, Paul Wall & Chamillionaire		4:40
16	"This Isn’t Life (Outro)"	Chamillionaire	Instrumental from: Sean P - Everywhere I Go	2:54
