= Chamillitary Entertainment =

- Founded: 2004
- Founder: Chamillionaire
- Distributor: Universal Records
- Genre: Southern hip hop, hip hop
- Country of origin: United States
- Location: Houston, Texas

Chamillitary is an entertainment company and hip hop record label owned and run by rapper Chamillionaire. It was previously distributed by Universal. It has since been an independent record label company.

== History ==
Chamillitary Entertainment was founded in 2004 by Chamillionaire after he had left record labels; Swishahouse and Paid In Full Entertainment.

Chamillionaire, alongside The Color Changin' Click, found themselves without a label home- after a falling out with Paul Wall, who returned to Swishahouse. In early 2004, Chamillionaire decided to form his own label; Chamillitary Entertainment. He signed his younger brother Rasaq to the label, as well as 50/50 Twin.

Rasaq would eventually leave the label to pursue his own goals and 50/50 Twin left the label in 2006. Chamillionaire later signed Lil Ken to the label in 2007 along with R&B singer Tony Henry and Yung Ro. Yung Ro would eventually leave the label in late 2008 due to differences with Chamillionaire. The label has been independent since January 15, 2011. This is because Chamillionaire and Universal parted ways. Chamillionaire is currently working on his 3rd studio album Poison. While working on Poison, Chamillionaire has gone on to release various projects and singles.

== Artists ==
Artist	Year Signed	# of Projects under Chamillitary Entertainment
Chamillionaire	2004	28
Lil Ken	2007	7
Tony Henry	2007	2

=== Former artists ===
Artist	Year Signed	Year Left	# of Projects under Chamillitary Entertainment
Rasaq	2004	2006	2
50/50 Twin	2004	2006	0
Yung Ro	2007	2008	0

== Discography ==
=== Albums ===
- 2005: The Sound of Revenge by Chamillionaire
- 2007: Ultimate Victory by Chamillionaire
- TBA: Poison by Chamillionaire
- 2012: The Soul Experience by Tony Henry

=== Extended plays ===
- 2012: Ammunition (EP) by Chamillionaire
- 2013: Elevate by Chamillionaire
- 2013: Reignfall by Chamillionaire
- 2015: Nawfwest God EP by Lil Ken

=== Compilation albums ===
- 2005: Chamillitary

=== Mixtapes ===
- Rasaq & Chamillionaire
  - 2004: Bootlegger's Special 1.5
  - 2004: Ghetto Status
- The Color Changin' Click
  - 2004: The Mixtape Messiah (Disk 3)
  - 2005: Tippin Down 2005
- Lil Ken
  - 2007: The Undisputed
  - 2008: Money Power & Fame
  - 2011: Chamillitary Presents Famous as... Hollywood Jackson
  - 2013: Hollywood Chronicles
  - 2013: Hollywood Chronicles Vol. 2
  - 2014: Underground Giant Pt. 2
- Tony Henry
  - 2009: Jam Sessions
- Chamillionaire
  - 2004: The Mixtape Messiah
  - 2005: The Truth
  - 2005: Man on Fire
  - 2005: Big Business (With Stat Quo)
  - 2006: Mixtape Messiah 2
  - 2007: Mixtape Messiah 3
  - 2008: Mixtape Messiah 4
  - 2008: Mixtape Messiah 5
  - 2009: Mixtape Messiah 6
  - 2009: Mixtape Messiah 7
  - 2009: I Am Legend: Greatest Verses
  - 2009: Hangin' Wit' Mr. Koopa
  - 2010: Major Pain
  - 2011: Major Pain 1.5
  - 2012: Badazz Freemixes
  - 2012: Badazz Freemixes 2
  - 2012: Badazz Slow-Mixes
  - 2014: Greatest Verses Vol. 2
