= Paid in Full Entertainment =

- Genre: Southern hip hop; chopped and screwed; gangsta rap
- Country of origin: United States
- Location: Houston, Texas

Paid in Full Entertainment is an American recording label based in Houston, Texas and owned by Benjamin Thompson. The label has housed such artists as Chamillionaire, Paul Wall, 50/50 Twin, The Color Changin' Click (which is a group consisting of the aforementioned rappers plus others), Mista Madd, Shei Atkins. They have also released remixes of songs released by fellow Houston-based label Swishahouse.

== Discography ==
- 1997: Madd Hatta – The pH-Factor
- 1999: Madd Hatta – Mista Madd & The Supa Thuggz
- 2000: Madd Hatta – Can I Live?
- 2002: Paul Wall & Chamillionaire – Get Ya Mind Correct
- 2004: Paul Wall – Chick Magnet
- 2004: Various Artists – Paid In Full Presents The Family Jewels
- 2004: 50/50 Twin – Grown Man Style
- 2005: Paul Wall & Chamillionaire – Controversy Sells
- 2007: Madd Hatta – Still Standing
