= Renegade (Jay-Z song) =

Song by Jay-Z featuring Eminem

from the album The Blueprint
- Released: September 11, 2001
- Recorded: October 1999 - July 2001
- Genre: Hardcore hip hop; political hip hop
- Length: 5:37
- Label: Roc-A-Fella; Def Jam
- Songwriters: Shawn Carter; Marshall Mathers; Luis Resto
- Producers: Eminem; Luis Resto

"Renegade" is a song by American rapper Jay-Z featuring Eminem, who produced the song with Luis Resto. Written by all three, the song appears as the 12th track on the former's sixth album The Blueprint. It was originally a collaboration between Eminem and Royce da 5'9" as part of the Bad Meets Evil series, but Royce was later replaced by Jay-Z. The original can be found on mixtapes and has been leaked onto the internet.

The Jay-Z version of the song, released in 2001 as featured on The Blueprint, was later included as a bonus track on the deluxe edition of Eminem's 2005 greatest hits album, Curtain Call: The Hits.

== Background ==
"Renegade" was originally recorded by Bad Meets Evil, a hip hop duo with members Eminem and Royce da 5'9". During the recording of Royce da 5'9"'s debut studio album Rock City, to be released via Columbia Records, Interscope Records informed Royce da 5'9" that they would only allow one Eminem collaboration on the album, forcing him to choose between two songs the pair had recorded together: the title track and "Renegade". He chose the former, which went on to be released as the album's first single, leaving "Renegade" unreleased for the time being.

During an interview on the MTV show RapFix Live in 2011, Eminem revealed that he had initially intended to present Jay-Z with an entirely different production when the latter reached out and asked him to work on The Blueprint: however, Eminem did not have physical access to the reel it was recorded on at the time. Knowing Jay-Z was working to a short deadline, Eminem decided to offer him "Renegade" instead. After Royce da 5'9" granted his approval, Jay-Z recorded his own vocals in place of Royce's and sent them back to Eminem, who mixed them together into the final version of the song.

The song is referenced by rapper Nas on his famous Jay-Z diss song "Ether" made during their highly publicized feud. Nas says to Jay-Z that "Eminem murdered you on your own shit;" stating that he felt Eminem outperformed Jay-Z on his own song. Nas and Jay-Z had both contributed to the soundtrack of Eminem's 2002 film 8 Mile, with Nas' contribution, "U Wanna Be Me", being a diss towards Jay-Z. Rapper The Game made reference to the Nas verse on "Ether", on his own song with Eminem, "We Ain't", in satire by stating "Lo, get Dre on the phone quick Tell him Em' just killed me on my own shit".

Rolling Stone praised Jay-Z's verse full of "lucid, entrancing metaphors that work both as introspection and inspiration", and admiring his decision to abstain from "battl[ing] on Em's gloriously spiteful turf", instead following his own artistic path. The Eminem verse was described as "tightly packed internal rhymes burst with assonance and flow almost casually yet no less emphatically.

== Song meaning ==
The song has different meanings to both artists. Jay-Z's two verses deal with his fatherless childhood, and how financial difficulties faced by his mother forced him to sell drugs for survival (thus becoming a renegade to society). He states his demeanor was "30 years [his] senior," implying that hardships he faced during his childhood forced him to grow up and make adult decisions from a young age. Jay-Z argues that his music is the product of his rough upbringing, and that it speaks to others going through the same problems. Thus, he dismisses critics who lump him together with artists who only rap about "jewels". He accuses these critics of simply "skimming" through his music, instead of listening thoroughly.

On the other hand, Eminem deals with the public perception of his music. At the time, Eminem was at the center of many criticisms due to the content of his lyrics. His references to drug use and religion caused many parents to publicly denounce his music. Eminem sees this outcry as hypocritical, claiming that these parents are using him as a "media scapegoat" to deflect attention away from their own shortcomings as parents. Both of his verses are to state that Eminem and he are liable to kill if the need is felt. Ultimately, both Jay-Z and Eminem use the hook to say that, while they may face public disapproval for different reasons, they will not change their behavior and have "never been afraid to talk about anything".

== Credits and personnel ==
The credits for "Renegade" are adapted from the liner notes of The Blueprint.

Studio locations

- Mastered at Masterdisk, New York City, New York.
- Mixed at Studio A Recording, Los Angeles, California.
- Recorded at Baseline Studios, New York City, New York.

Personnel

- Jay-Z – songwriting, vocals
- Eminem – production, songwriting, vocals, mixing
- Young Guru – recording
- Richard Huredia – mixing
- Tony Dawsey – mastering
- DJ Head – drum programming
- Luis Resto – keyboards

== Certifications ==
Region	Certification	Certified units/sales
New Zealand (RMNZ)	Gold	15,000^{‡}
United Kingdom (BPI)	Silver	200,000^{‡}
United States (RIAA)	Gold	500,000^{‡}
^{‡} Sales+streaming figures based on certification alone.
