= Chamillionaire =

American rapper (born 1979)

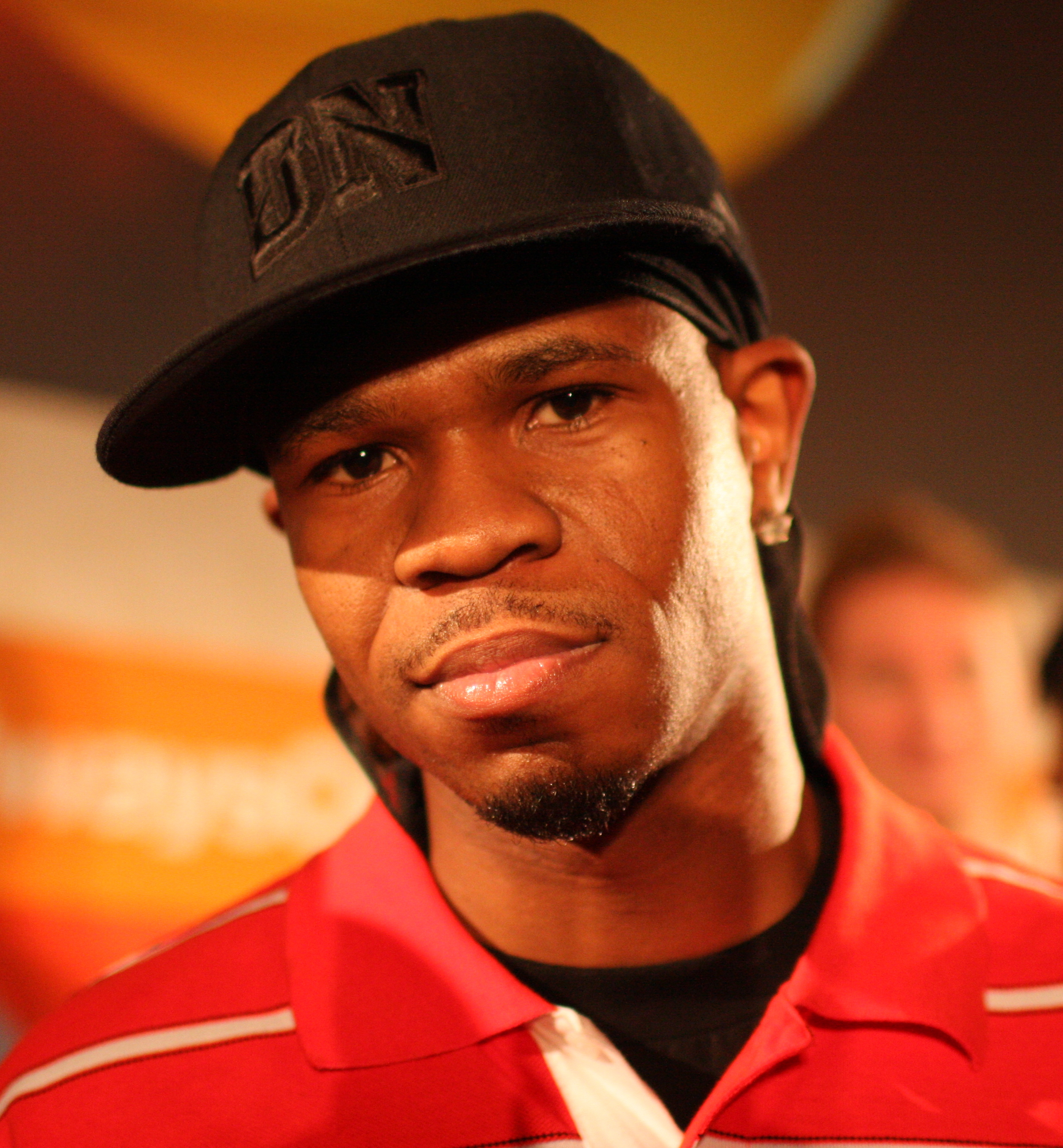
- Chamillionaire in 2008

Background information
- Born: Hakeem Temidayo Seriki; November 28, 1979 (age 46); Washington, D.C., U.S.
- Origin: Houston, Texas, U.S.
- Genre: Southern hip hop
- Occupations: Rapper; songwriter; entrepreneur
- Works: Chamillionaire discography
- Years active: 1997–present
- Labels: Chamillitary; Swishahouse; Paid in Full; Universal Motown; Universal
- Formerly of: The Color Changin' Click
- Children: 1
- Website: web.archive.org/web/20100612194236/http://chamillionaire.com/

Hakeem Temidayo Seriki (born November 28, 1979), better known by his stage name Chamillionaire (/kəˈmɪliənɛər/ kə-MIL-yə-nair), is an American rapper and businessman. He began his career in Houston's hip hop scene in the late 1990s. He was briefly signed with the local record label Swishahouse until forming the hip hop duo The Color Changin’ Click with labelmate Paul Wall in 2002. The two signed with Houston's Paid in Full Entertainment to release the collaborative album Get Ya Mind Correct (2002), which entered the Top R&B/Hip-Hop Albums chart.

Seriki signed with Universal Records as a solo act in 2005. His debut studio album, The Sound of Revenge (2005), peaked within the top ten of the Billboard 200 and received critical praise, along with his second album, Ultimate Victory (2007). The former was preceded by the singles "Ridin'" (featuring Krayzie Bone) — which peaked atop the Billboard Hot 100 and won Best Rap Performance at the 49th Annual Grammy Awards — and "Turn It Up" (featuring Lil' Flip), while the latter was preceded by "Hip Hop Police" (featuring Slick Rick) and notable for its lack of profanity. His 2009 pop rap single, "Good Morning", peaked within the top 40 of the Billboard Hot 100 was intended to lead his third album, Venom, which was never released.

In 2011, Seriki left Universal Records and released his first independent extended play (EP), Ammunition, in March 2012. His second EP, Elevate, was released in February 2013, followed by his third, Reignfall, in July of that year. Prior, he released the mixtape series Mixtape Messiah from 2004 to 2009.

He was the founder of the Color Changin' Click, which was formed in 2001 and disbanded in 2005. Seriki founded Chamillitary Entertainment in 2004. He joined Los Angeles–based venture capital firm Upfront Ventures in 2015, and has since focused on numerous entrepreneurial and business endeavors. He co-created the now-defunct social media app Convoz in January 2018.

== Early life ==
Seriki was born to a Muslim Yoruba father from Nigeria and an African-American Christian mother in Washington, D.C., and moved to Houston, Texas at the age of four. Seriki's parents separated in his early teenage years. He settled into the Acres Homes neighborhood of northwest Houston. He attended Jersey Village High School alongside rap partner Paul Wall.

Rap and other forms of secular music, which his parents had highly opposed in their household, became very appealing to Seriki, who was still in his teens at the time. Seriki has stated that he was inspired by southern rap acts such as the Geto Boys, 8 Ball & MJG, and UGK, as well as other national acts such as N.W.A and Public Enemy. At a young age, Seriki, along with fellow rap music artist and childhood friend Paul Wall, had decided to make music their careers. Seriki has a brother, who is three years younger than him, Rasaq Seriki, who is also an occasional rapper and a past member of The Color Changin' Click.

== Music career ==
=== 1998–2004: Career beginnings ===
Seriki's stage name Chamillionaire is a portmanteau of "chameleon" and "millionaire" While promoting at an event, Seriki and fellow rapper Paul Wall met Michael "5000" Watts, a popular mixtape DJ from northern Houston. After proposing to do promotions for Watts's company Swishahouse, Seriki and Paul Wall came to Watts's studio and convinced Watts to allow them to freestyle on an intro to Watts's radio show on Houston hip-hop radio station KBXX-FM. Watts, who himself was convinced to rap on the record, enjoyed the freestyle so much that he put the verses on one of his mixtapes.

Soon, Seriki (performing as Chamillionaire) and Paul Wall became regular staples on Houston's mixtape circuit, appeared on several of Watts's mixtapes, and became permanent members of Swishahouse. Seriki and Paul Wall soon started their own group, The Color Changin' Click. In 2002, Seriki and Paul Wall collaborated for the album Get Ya Mind Correct, which went on to sell over 150,000 copies. The Source magazine nominated the album for independent album of the year in 2002. Seriki and the Color Changin' Click, dubbed "Houston's answer to 50 Cent and his G-Unit posse", performed at the SXSW music festival in 2004.

=== 2005–2006: The Sound of Revenge ===
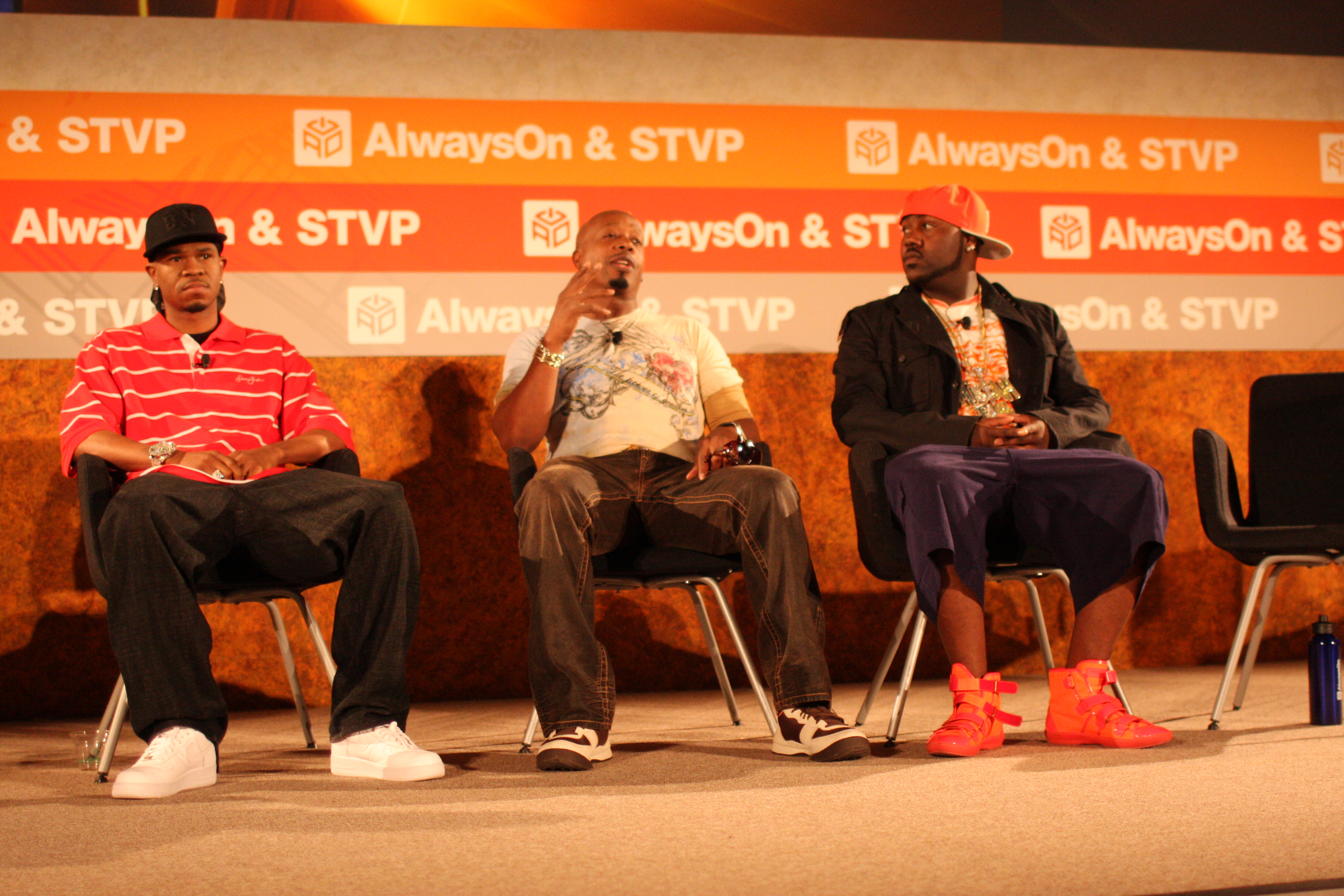
Left to right: Seriki, MC Hammer and Mistah F.A.B. at TechCrunch in 2008

Seriki's first major solo release The Sound of Revenge was released through Chamillitary Entertainment and Universal Records on November 22, 2005. The album debuted and peaked at number 10 on the Billboard 200 album chart in the United States. The album's lead single was "Turn It Up", featuring Lil' Flip produced by Scott Storch, followed by "Ridin'", featuring Krayzie Bone of Bone Thugs-n-Harmony produced by Play-N-Skillz; "Ridin'" reached number one on the Billboard Hot 100. Its video also was named "Best Rap Video" at the 2006 MTV Video Music Awards. In 2007, he won a Grammy Award for Best Rap Performance by a Duo or Group for "Ridin'". He was at that time signed with Michael 5000 Watts' Swishahouse label. Comedic performer "Weird Al" Yankovic made a parody of the song entitled "White & Nerdy", for his own album Straight Outta Lynwood. The third single from the album was "Grown and Sexy".

Additionally, the bonus track "Grind Time" was featured in the video game NBA Live 06. The album was certified platinum by the RIAA, and a chopped and screwed version, screwed by OG Ron C, was released in February 2006. Guest appearances for the album included Lil' Flip, Natalie, Krayzie Bone, Bun B, Lil Wayne, Pastor Troy, Killer Mike, Scarface, singer Billy Cook, and his brother Rasaq. Seriki won the Best New Artist award for the 2006 BET Awards.

The second installment to the Mixtape Messiah series, Mixtape Messiah 2, was released January 5, 2006. Later in 2006, Seriki was featured in the singles "Get Up" by Ciara, "That Girl" by Frankie J, "Bet That" by Trick Daddy, "King Kong" by Jibbs, and "Doe Boy Fresh" by Three Six Mafia in 2007.

=== 2007–2008: Ultimate Victory ===
To promote his new album, Seriki released Mixtape Messiah 3 as a prelude to his new album on July 18, 2007, at 11pm Eastern Time on his website. Seriki released his second mainstream album Ultimate Victory on September 18, 2007. Ultimate Victory was made without a single profanity said by Seriki. Guest appearances included UGK, Krayzie Bone, Lil Wayne, Famous (Lil Ken), Tony Henry, Devin the Dude and Lloyd. The first single was "Hip Hop Police", featuring Slick Rick, which both Seriki and Slick Rick performed on the CBS television network program Late Show with David Letterman on September 14, 2007. The following single was "The Evening News."

Mixtape Messiah 4, the fourth title in Seriki's Mixtape Messiah series, was initially set for release on December 18, 2007, but was released on August 27, 2008.

=== 2008–2010: Final Mixtape Messiah, Venom, and Major Pain ===
In November 2008, Seriki announced his plans for his third album, Venom, for release in early 2009. His sixth installment in the Mixtape Messiah series was to be a "prelude" to Venom. The first single from Venom was initially planned to be "Creepin' (Solo)", which featured Ludacris and ended up reaching No.1 on the Billboard Bubbling Under R&B/Hip-Hop Singles chart. However, it is unclear whether or not the song will be included on Venom after Seriki canceled and then reinstated the album.

He announced that Mixtape Messiah 7 would be the final installment of the "Mixtape Messiah" series and that he cancelled Venom to create different material for his third album. Seriki awarded his final Mixtape Messiah 7 to 100 winners of a contest which he ran on his website. The first disc from Mixtape Messiah 7 was launched for free download on August 4, 2009, and Disc 2 was released on August 6, 2009. The next day, the Discs 3 and 4 were released for a total of 66 tracks.

On September 29, it was officially announced that Seriki's third album would indeed be entitled Venom after a fan vote on his website. The first single from this upcoming album was titled "Good Morning". The album was scheduled to be released on June 22, 2010.

Seriki appeared on the remix for Weezer's song "Can't Stop Partying", from their album Raditude. He also joined Weezer for live performances as Lil Wayne, who is featured on the original version of the track, was convicted on gun possession charges and was unable to perform.

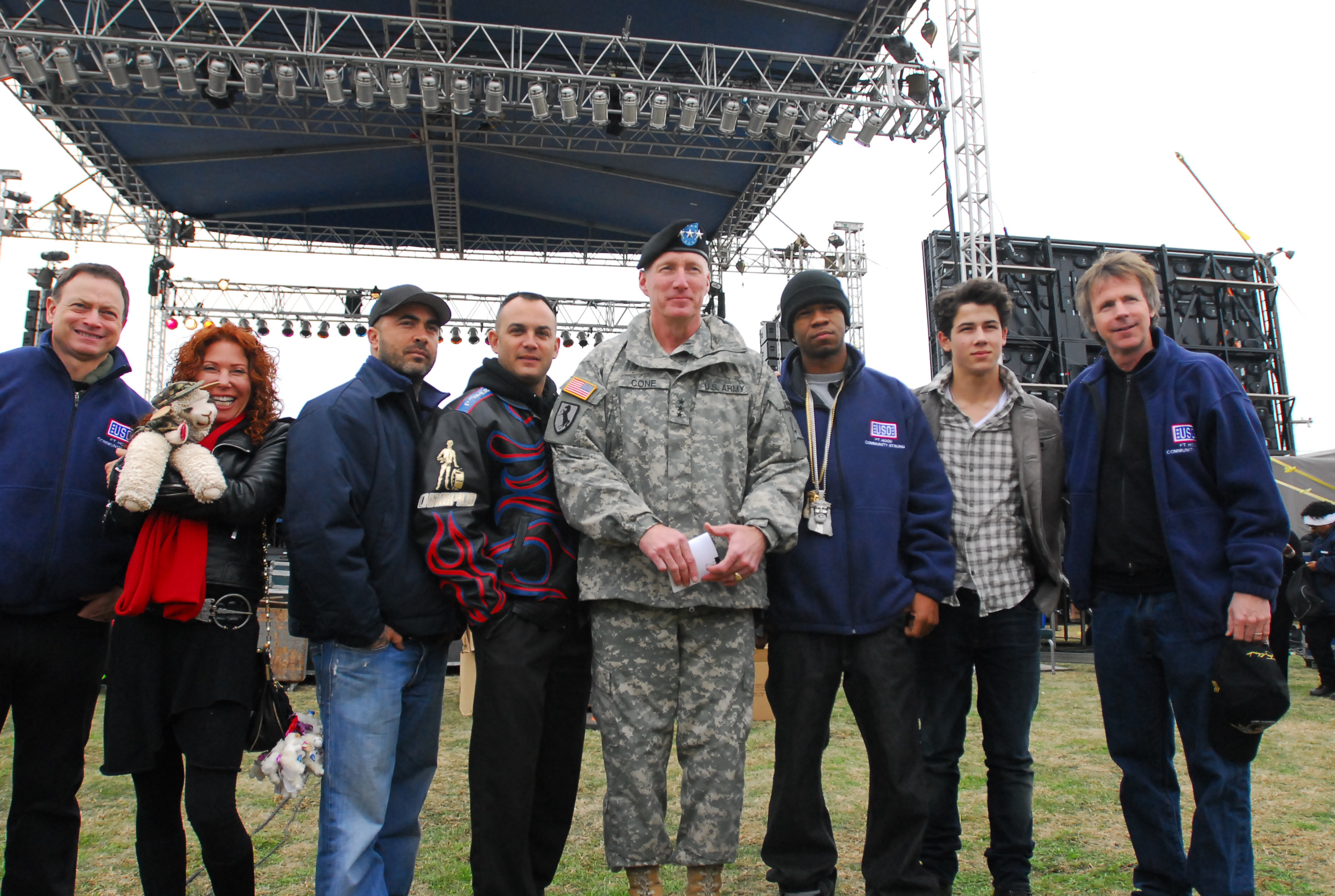
Seriki in 2009 with Gary Sinese, Mallory Lewis & Lamb Chop, Tony Stewart, Lt.Gen. Robert W. Cone, Nick Jonas, and Dana Carvey at the "Fort Hood Community Strong" event for those impacted by the 2009 Fort Hood shooting.

On December 11, 2009, Seriki performed a set for "Fort Hood Community Strong", an event described as a day of "healing, fun and entertainment" for those placed at the Fort Hood military base who were affected by the shooting that took place on November 5, 2009, killing 13 people. Other performers at the event included Nick Jonas, Dana Carvey and Zac Brown Band.

On December 23, 2009, Seriki announced via his YouTube page that he would be initiating a new mixtape, Major Pain, through his website on February 2, 2010.

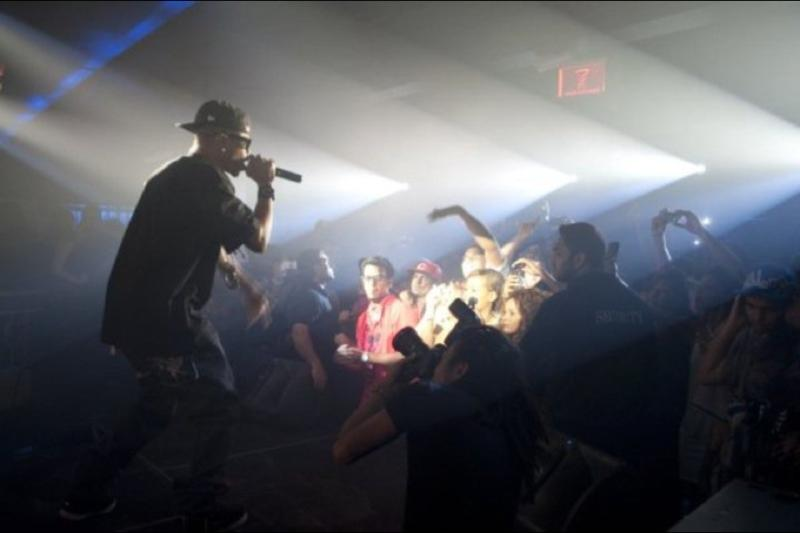
Seriki performing in Dubai in 2010.

Due to the 2010 NBA All-Star Game taking place in Dallas, Texas, Seriki released a new song, "The Main Event", on February 11, 2010, via free download. It features fellow Texas rappers Paul Wall, Slim Thug and Dorrough. "Every artist on the song with me has independent hustle and strength in the streets," he said. "It's an All-Star song, so what better place to shoot the video than All-Star Weekend, right here in our own backyard." It was later released to iTunes on June 8, 2010.

On Seriki's official website, he stated: "Right now the Venom album is set for March 16 and has been pushed back just like Lil Wayne's Rebirth, Game's Red album, and countless other hip-hop albums that this happens to." The date was later pushed back to June 22, but was not released that day.Venom was later released on DatPiff in 2011 as a bootlegged mixtape made by the fans.

=== 2011–2012: Departure from Universal Records and Playlist Poison ===
Seriki with Michael Arrington of TechCrunch.

According to Kanye West's engineer and producer Andrew Dawson, Seriki and Universal Records have parted ways. "I've been working a lot with Chamillionaire, because I produced some tracks for him. He got out of his deal with Universal [Records], which wasn't a good situation for either of them," revealed Dawson. "Him and I have an active producer agreement that is now null and void because they got caught in the legal shuffle, but I'm like, 'I just want the music to come out. Let's find a way to make it happen.' I was emailing him stuff back and forth when I was [with Kanye West] in Hawaii. Some big stuff will be coming out this next year, so I'm stoked to see it going." Seriki also tweeted that he'll be doing a Ustream session on January 14 to discuss his future plans.

During his live UStream on January 14, 2011, Seriki announced he was officially leaving Universal Records. As part of this deal he was not allowed to release Venom or any material recorded during that time. He was then working on a new series called Playlist Poison and released tracks on a random basis. The first Playlist Poison song released was "When Ya On" which featured Nipsey Hussle and was followed by "This My World" featuring Big K.R.I.T., "Charlie Sheen" featuring Rock D & Killer Mike, and "Passenger Seat" featuring Short Dawg.

On April 18, he released the next installment in his Major Pain mixtape series, Major Pain 1.5 for free download from his website, and subsequently released three other mixtapes entitled Badazz Freemixes, Badazz Freemixes 2 and Badazz Slowmixes. Seriki's eight song EP titled Ammunition was released for digital download on March 20, 2012, and all physical bundles were released on March 27, 2012. His third studio album, Poison, was initially announced for a 2013 release, but is still unreleased as of February 2020.

In 2012, Seriki was featured on the track "Mayday" from the Krizz Kaliko album Kickin' and Screamin' as well as the single "Keep Pushing" from the Saigon album The Greatest Story Never Told Chapter 2: Bread and Circuses.

On the December 4, 2012, Seriki released the single "Show Love" featuring D.A. of Chester French to iTunes. This was the only music video he released in 2012, although he appeared in the music video for the song "No Room in Hell" for the video game Dead Island: Riptide.

=== 2013–2015: EPs, finalizing Poison ===
On January 17, 2013, Seriki announced he had been working on a new extended play, stating that it would be one of many he would release to promote Poison. The seven-song EP, titled Elevate, was released on February 12, 2013. Elevate featured no guest artists.

Seriki announced that despite leaving Universal, Poison was likely to be released through a major label, unlike the various promotional EPs. On July 23, 2013, Seriki released Reignfall, his third EP. Reignfall would be his first project since his second studio album to chart on a Billboard chart. On February 13, 2014, Seriki released his first single of the year titled "Watching Breaking Bad" featuring Tami LaTrell, in recognition of the TV show Breaking Bad. The single "Go Getta" followed on February 28 and "End of a Knife", produced by Kato, was released on March 21, 2014.

=== Since 2015: Entrepreneurial career, hiatus and return to music ===
Since 2015, Seriki has been appointed as an entrepreneur in residence for Upfront Ventures. During this time he has given more focus to his entrepreneurial career than music. He was featured on one single titled "Sweet Dreams" by BeatKing in the same year. Seriki released volume 3 of his Greatest Verses on April 3, 2018, which contained a collection of non-album songs recorded from 2007 to 2014. After a two-year break, he returned to music in 2017 where he was featured on Trae tha Truth's single, "I'm On 3.0".

A music video for the single was released in January 2019, and was the first time in six years that Seriki made a music video appearance. He was featured on the song "Diamonds in the Sky" by Big Pokey which also featured Texan rappers Killa Kyleon and Kirko Bangz and was released in September 2021. On July 12, 2022, he appeared as a featured artist again on the single "Been Broke" by Tobe Nwigwe alongside 2 Chainz.

Since 2010, Seriki has stated his third album Poison is in the works. As of 2023, there is no set release date for the project.

== Entrepreneurial career ==
=== 2003–2005: Fly Rydes and record label ===
In addition to being a musician, Seriki has embarked a business career and established himself as an entrepreneur in a number of industries. In 2003, he ventured into one of his earliest investments in a Houston-based auto dealer and car customization shop, Fly Rydes Kustom Toy'z. Seriki's partner, Big Ernest, created the company years back, and Seriki decided to collaborate with him to get "corporate money" for the business and build its clientele. Seriki has since let Ernest take over the whole company, due to his career. He said, "Out here in Texas, that car thing is big. We'll do videos and rent all kinds of cars and people will waste all kinds of money on them, and instead, they can come spend that money with me."

Seriki founded his own record label, Chamillitary Entertainment. Seriki created the label after he had left his previous record labels, Swishahouse and Paid In Full Entertainment, as he was unsigned. It was distributed by Universal Records but has been independent since January 15, 2011, due to Seriki and the label parting ways.

=== 2006–2008: Masterpiece Mind Frame & Tour Bus Company ===
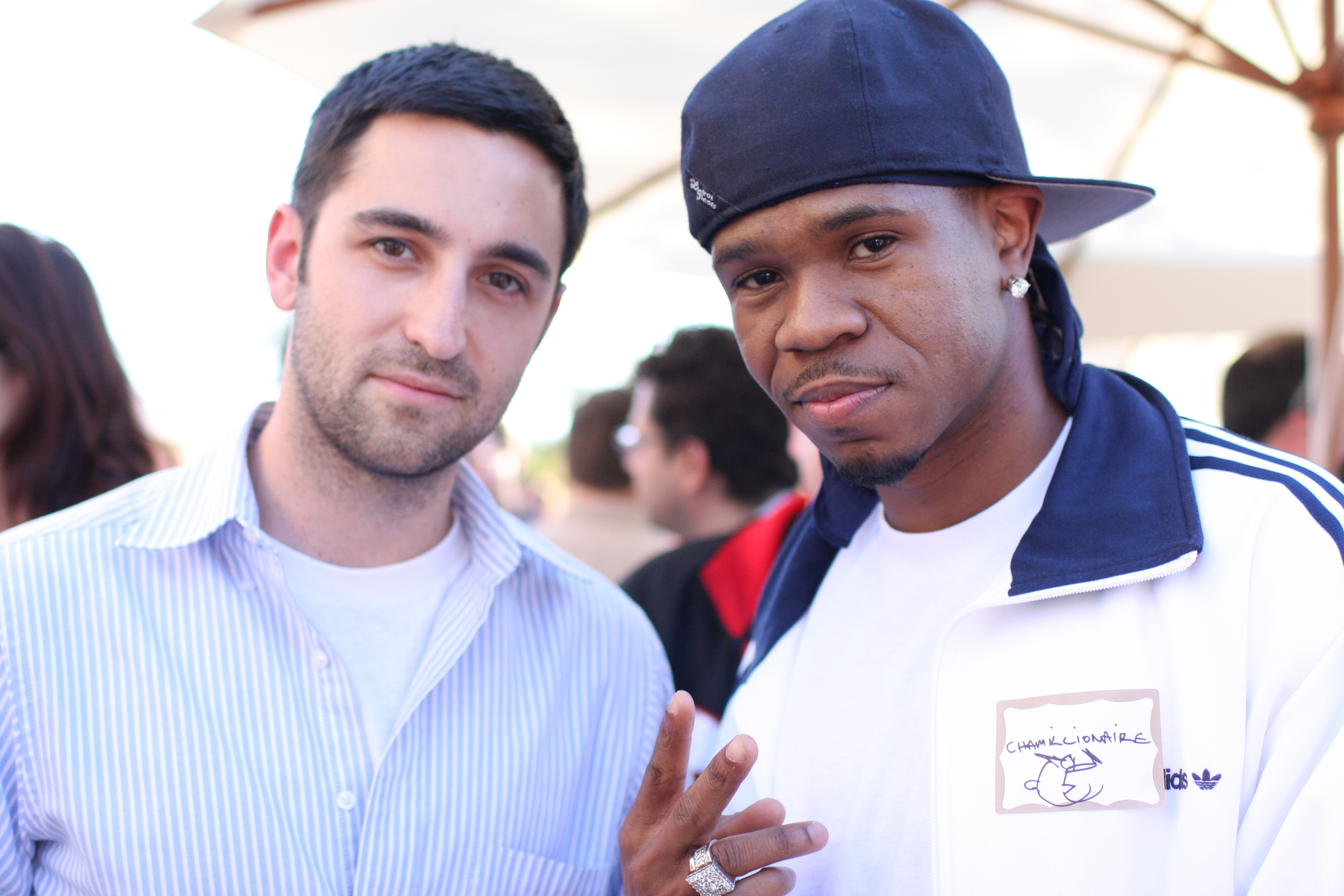
Seriki with Eric Eldon in 2008.

Seriki opened up a modelling company, called Masterpiece Mind Frame. He believes it is his way of giving back to those who have things to offer, he says, but do not know how to get there. "I will go out and see people and everybody wants to make money, and I will meet video girls who want to live the good life and all, but it is like, you gotta have a plan, you know?" Seriki stated. "That is why it's called Masterpiece Mind Frame because in the word mind frame, your MIND comes before your frame. Print modelling can turn into movies and other stuff, and you can just step all the way up the ladder. It's like that with males and females, and if you're trying to go somewhere, just walk up the ladder, you know, and take it to the next step."

Seriki also owns a Tour Bus company. He founded the company in 2006 after seeing the business potential from touring around the US after the release of The Sound of Revenge as a rapper. In addition, most of the tour buses have internet, cable, studio, DVD, surround sound and a shower.

=== 2009–2014: Maker Studios ===
Seriki met Mark Suster in 2009, an American entrepreneur and venture capitalist who is a managing partner at Upfront Ventures. Seriki invested in the Upfront-funded online video talent agency, Maker Studios. On November 4, 2009, Seriki also launched the Global Innovation Tournament 2009 at the Stanford Memorial Auditorium, Stanford University with Quincy Jones III as part of the Stanford Entrepreneurial Thought Leaders Seminar Series.

Seriki also invested in Cruise Automation, a self-driving automation tech company, during its startup stage in 2013. This investment proved successful after it sold to General Motors for over $1 billion in 2016. The self-driving company includes features such as a kit in which customers can transform their vehicles to include self-driving technology.

On March 24, 2014, Maker Studios, Inc. agreed to sell itself to The Walt Disney Company for $500 million, rising to $950 million if financial milestones were met. Seriki's investment in Maker Studios was $1.5 million and his payout was reported to be over $20 million. This investment forged a partnership between Seriki and Suster, as Suster realised Seriki wanted to establish himself the tech industry. On April 14, 2014, Relativity Media submitted a competing bid of up to $1.1 billion, but Maker denied the bid. In December 2015, the company became a subsidiary of Disney Consumer Products and the Disney Interactive division of The Walt Disney Company. The Network also partnered with Fusion TV in a deal that falls under the corporate umbrella of The Walt Disney Company.

=== 2014–2016: Upfront Ventures ===
Seriki invested in Lyft in 2015. In a 2019 interview with CNBC, he said that he sees great potential with Lyft and that he will keep his investment in the company for a long time.

On February 23, 2015, Upfront Ventures, the largest early-stage fund raised in L.A since 2000, confirmed that Seriki was appointed as an entrepreneur in residence. In a letter penned by Mark Suster he explained the presence of Chamillionaire around the office. "The same Chamillionaire who was showing us how to get our respective shines on not a decade ago. But if Kanye has taught us anything, it's that we can find success in multiple creative outlets. In the past five years or so, Cham has been quietly but actively involved in the tech startup scene, from speaking on social media engagement in the music industry to hanging out with Y Combinator associates."

=== 2017–2021: Convoz ===
Seriki teased that he was working on something bigger than music in summer 2017 as part of being an EIR at Upfront Ventures with a soft launch of the social media app. In February 2018, at the Upfront Summit, Seriki announced Convoz, a social media app which allows an influencer to connect directly with his fans. Seriki describes the app as a "the place where you go to talk to people." and the launch comes after he "just wasn't happy with the communication channels that are currently existing on social media." The app permits users to share 15-second clips, which are usually addressed to celebrities. The celebrities can then decide which fan or user they can reply to, individually or all to see. The startup has a total of seven employees, and has cultivated an undisclosed amount of seed funding from Greycroft Ventures, Upfront Ventures, 500 Startups, Precursor VC, Okapi Ventures, XG Ventures, and a roster of angels including Justin Kan and Snoop Dogg.

In May 2019, Seriki, in an interview with Yahoo! Finance, announced that they are going to invest $25,000 into a startup founded and managed by a woman or person of color alongside rapper E-40. The move came after it was published that Caucasians make up 87% of Venture Capital-backed CEO's and 97% of those positions are held by men. In September 2019, Seriki invested in Atoms, the first footwear company to come in quarter sizes. The investment was led by Initialized Capital, the investment firm started by Reddit co-founder Alexis Ohanian and Garry Tan.

After seeing the success of his initial $25,000 investment pledge, Seriki and E-40 launched another, much larger, $100,000 competition for minority or woman start-ups. Shark Tank judge Daymond John and Republic.co also joined the team to narrow the search. The winner of the competition was Pierre Laguerre and it was announced in January 2020. His startup idea was "Fleeting Pro", a company that links certified class A & B drivers to trucking companies for scheduled, on-demand transportation needs.

=== Since 2022: Access Club ===
In May 2022, Seriki's tech company X Empire Inc. released the beta for the Access Club app, the private members-only social club was made for private investing and deals and gives members exclusive access to startups and companies looking to connect with people of influence.

== Personal life ==
A 2018 piece by MissK titled after lyrics by Seriki "They see me rollin', they hatin.'" Braille graffiti artwork by Vered Dror sits above.

Seriki announced through a video log that he has a son born on May 14, 2010. He points out that his son's name, Xavier, means "new house". Seriki has stated that despite being a Texas native, he has always been a Los Angeles Lakers fan. He goes on to say that "I know a few people think I'm on the bandwagon because the Lakers are a hot team but I was on the Lakers when people wasn't really rooting for them."

On June 3, 2010, Seriki's third mortgage property home was foreclosed on by the bank. The rapper told TMZ in a public video claiming to have given it back to the bank after paying just over US$2 million on it and claims it was a bad investment and he was never in it.

== Feud with Paul Wall ==
External videos
- Go Head (Feat. Rasaq), Paul Wall diss track

On November 19, 2004, Seriki's younger brother, Rasaq Seriki, was allegedly attacked by Paul Wall and his entourage at a nightclub. Seriki expressed his disappointment in Paul Wall, arguing that they all used to be family and that these events should not have happened. Before the entire incident between Paul Wall and Rasaq they were all part of the group called "The Color Changin' Click" which now has become fragmented. Seriki released a diss track with Rasaq titled "Go Head". The dispute ended in 2010, when the pair reunited for a full tour.

== Discography ==
Studio albums

- The Sound of Revenge (2005)
- Ultimate Victory (2007)

Collaborative albums

- Get Ya Mind Correct (with Paul Wall) (2002)
- Controversy Sells (with Paul Wall) (2005)

Extended plays

- Ammunition (2012)
- Elevate (2013)
- Reignfall (2013)

== Filmography ==
Television
Year	Show	Role	Notes
2007	Punk'd	Himself	1 episode (season 8, episode 2)
2007	The Game	Himself	1 episode ("When the Chickens Come Home to Roost – Part 1")
2007	Pimp My Ride	Himself	1 episode (season 6, episode 10) – featuring Chamillionaire as guest host

== See also ==
- Culture of Houston
- History of the African Americans in Houston
