= Yung Ro =

American rapper

- Born: Roland Sato Lee Page; New Orleans, Louisiana, U.S.

Roland Sato Lee Page, also known as Yung Ro, is an American rapper. Born Roland Sato Lee Page in Houston Texas, he is an independent artist and CEO of his own record label, Black Pearl Entertainment.

== Career ==
Yung Ro began his music career as a member of a rap duo with a childhood friend in high school. He released his first single "Donk Dat" which was released in the spring of 2009. This song was produced by Mark 'Tar Boy' Williams, one half of the music producing duo Trackboyz (who produced Nelly's "Air Force Ones"). "Donk Dat" peaked at the #3 spot on the Billboard 'Hot R&B/Hip Hop Single Sales' chart; another single, "Fresha Den a Mall," reached #6 on the same chart and was also in rotation on 104.1 FM in St. Louis. Yung Ro released a mixtape entitled "The Tattoo Chronicles" featuring DJ Deception was also released in the spring of 2009. His first album, "The Rising Son," includes the "Donk Dat Remix" featuring Chingy (formerly of Disturbing tha Peace {DTP}) and City Spud (of the St. Lunatics) as well as "Push It Back" which was produced by Grammy Award winners Trak Starz. He is currently the owner operator of the Pearl Gallery tattoo shop in Midtown, St. Louis.
