= Ultimate Victory =

2007 studio album by Chamillionaire

Studio album by Chamillionaire
- Released: September 14, 2007
- Recorded: 2006–2007
- Genres: Southern hip-hop; political hip-hop
- Length: 79:47
- Labels: Chamillitary; Universal Motown
- Producers: J.R. Rotem; Play-N-Skillz; Rick Rock; Kane Beatz; The Runners; The Beat Bullies; Tha Bizness

Chamillionaire chronology
The Sound of Revenge (2005)	Ultimate Victory (2007)	Poison (TBA)

Singles from Ultimate Victory
- 1. "Hip Hop Police" Released: July 22, 2007; 2. "The Bill Collecta" Released: September 18, 2007; 3. "Industry Groupie" Released: October 9, 2007

Ultimate Victory is the second studio album by American rapper Chamillionaire. It was released on September 14, 2007, by Chamillitary Entertainment and Universal Motown Records. The album debuted at number 8 on the US Billboard 200, selling 79,000 copies in the first week. It is notable for not containing any profanity.

== Critical reception ==
Professional ratings
Review scores
Source	Rating
About.com	4/5 stars
AllHipHop	8.5/10
AllMusic	3.5/5 stars
Entertainment Weekly	B
Montreal Mirror	8/10
PopMatters	7/10
Rolling Stone	3.5/5 stars
Stylus Magazine	B−
USA Today	3/5 stars
XXL	(L)

Ultimate Victory was generally well received by music critics. Rolling Stone gave note of Chamillionaire's subject matter detailing his disdain towards the "record industry, money-grubbing ex-friends and lazy rappers" while backing up his sentiments with tracks like the Bun B-assisted "Pimp Mode" and "We Breakin' Up". They concluded by praising the closing title track stating, "“The Ultimate Victory”—on which Chamillionaire expresses sympathy for media-dogged celebrities like Eminem and Britney Spears and admits, "I'm still filled with doubt"—might be the most personally reflective hip-hop track since Slim Shady himself stepped to the mic."

Despite finding a few duds in the track listing, AllMusic's David Jeffries called the album "[A] positive outlook for the future of the genre", praising Cham's pedigree to deliver "verse-filled hip-hop" by smartly utilizing top-notch production and guest artists to deliver catchy songs with substance, concluding that "Ultimate Victory is a brilliant way to recover from overexposure and bring things back to a more sensible level if a long-term, credible career is what's at stake."

Edna Gundersen from USA Today found the record to be "a surprisingly counterintuitive hip-hop journey", noting its lack of profanity, Cham's criticism on the "materialistic bent and greedy sycophants" that represent the genre, and showing empathy for his fellow artists under media scrutiny, concluding that "Victory ultimately is achieved through Chamillionaire’s charged flow, snappy taunts and unexpected singing talents."

Thomas A. Harden of XXL commended Cham's aggressive delivery towards media gossip, the hip-hop industry and government politics but felt that it "comes off preachy, rather than poetic." He added that said approach works better when its added with "a spoonful of sugar with his doses of hip-hop medicine ("I Think I Love You"), flexes his lyrical skills ("You Must Be Crazy") or just has fun on the mic ("The Ultimate Vacation")."

PopMatters contributor Josh Timmermann also found Cham being try-hard when tackling tabloid news and politics, but praised his forays into more conventional topics with solid beats and relaxed flows. Timmermann concluded by praising Cham's performance on the title track, saying "it's convincing proof that there might, after all, be life after "Ridin'" for a rapper who previously seemed bound for one-hit wonder status."

== Track listing ==
Ultimate Victory track listing
No.	Title	Writer(s)	Producer(s)	Length
1.	"The Morning News"	Hakeem Seriki; Daniel Johnson	Kane Beatz	3:58
2.	"Hip Hop Police" (featuring Slick Rick)	Seriki; Jonathan Rotem; Richard Walters	J.R. Rotem	4:11
3.	"Standing Ovation"	Seriki; Johnson; Kurt Carr	Kane Beatz	4:27
4.	"Won't Let You Down" (featuring KC)	Seriki; Johnson; Kevin Cossom	Kane Beatz	4:37
5.	"Industry Groupie"	Seriki; Rotem	J.R. Rotem	3:32
6.	"Pimp Mode" (featuring Bun B)	Seriki; Nathan Perez; Bernard Freeman	Happy Perez	5:22
7.	"Rock Star" (featuring Lil Wayne)	Seriki; Nsilo Reddick; Nick Sherwood; Dwayne Carter	The Beat Bullies	5:00
8.	"Skit"			3:04
9.	"The Bill Collecta" (featuring Krayzie Bone)	Seriki; Juan Salinas; Oscar Salinas; Anthony Henderson	Play-N-Skillz	3:51
10.	"The Ultimate Vacation"	Seriki; Reddick; Sherwood	The Beat Bullies	4:05
11.	"Come Back to the Streets"	Seriki; Andrew Harr; Jermaine Jackson	The Runners	4:52
12.	"I Think I Love You"	Seriki; Reddick; Sherwood	The Beat Bullies	4:43
13.	"The Evening News"	Seriki; Johnson	Kane Beatz	4:08
14.	"Welcome to the South" (featuring Pimp C)	Seriki; Johnson; Chad Butler	Kane Beatz	4:12
15.	"You Must Be Crazy" (featuring Lil Ken)	Seriki; Jomar Dogue; Ken Jackson	Jomeezius The Genius	4:54
16.	"We Breakin' Up"	Seriki; Scott Jung	CHOPS	4:40
17.	"Skit: Stuck in the Ghetto" (featuring Tony Henry)			1:45
18.	"Rocky Road" (featuring Devin the Dude)	Seriki; Perez; Devin Copeland	Happy Perez	4:59
19.	"The Ultimate Victory"	Seriki; Perez	Happy Perez	3:11

Additional track(s)
No.	Title	Writer(s)	Producer(s)	Length
20.	"Somebody's Gonna Get Hurt" (Best Buy digital bonus track)	Seriki; Ricardo Thomas	Rick Rock	3:25
21.	"Keep It on the Hush" (featuring Lloyd)	Seriki; Lloyd Polite Jr.; Matthew Kent Pearson	Matty P	4:01
22.	"Still Countin' My Cash" (iTunes Store bonus track)	Seriki	TrakTwinz.com	4:25

=== Bonus DVD ===
Chamillionaire released his Bonus DVD to Ultimate Victory. This DVD is only in exclusive double-pack in BET Edition available at Wal-Mart.

DVD features are:

- Access Granted: "Turn It Up", "Ridin'", "Grown & Sexy", "Hip-Hop Police"/"Evening News"
- 106 & Park: Chamillionaire Interview
- BET Spring Bling 2007 Performance
- BET Black Collage Tour
- Fly Rydes

Music videos:

- "Hip Hop Police"
- "The Evening News"

=== Samples ===
- "The Morning News"
  - "Segue II" by New Power Generation
- "Hip Hop Police
  - "Gin and Juice" by Snoop Dogg
  - "Murder Was the Case" by Snoop Dogg
- "Standing Ovation"
  - "Reign" by Kurt Carr
- "Industry Groupie"
  - "The Final Countdown" by Europe
- "The Ultimate Victory"
  - "Pollution" by Baby Bash

== Personnel ==
- Issiah Abolin – engineer (2)
- Aaron Dahl – engineer (7), additional engineering (4, 13)
- James Hoover – engineer (1, 4, 6, 9, 13, 14, 16, 18, 19), mixing (1, 3, 4, 6, 9, 13, 14, 16, 18, 19)
- Josh Houghkirk – engineer (10–12), additional engineering (2, 5, 7, 10–12, 15)
- Rob Montes – engineer (9, 15), mixing (9)
- Greg Ogan – engineer (2, 5)
- Jonathan Rotem – all instruments (2)
- Phil Tan – mixing (2, 5, 7, 10–12, 15)
- Nick Taylor – engineer (3)

== Charts ==
Chart performance for Ultimate Victory
Chart (2007)	Peak position
Australian Hitseekers Albums (ARIA)	11
Australian Urban Albums (ARIA)	15
Canadian Albums (Nielsen SoundScan)	19
French Albums (SNEP)	97
Irish Albums (IRMA)	74
Swiss Albums (Schweizer Hitparade)	65
UK Albums (Official Charts)	91
UK R&B Albums (Official Charts)	10
US Billboard 200	8
US Top R&B/Hip-Hop Albums (Billboard)	3
US Top Rap Albums (Billboard)	3

== Release history ==
Release history and formats for Ultimate Victory
Region	Date
Germany	September 14, 2007
Japan	September 17, 2007
United States	September 18, 2007
United Kingdom	October 1, 2007
