= List of awards and nominations received by Chamillionaire =

Chamillionaire awards and nominations
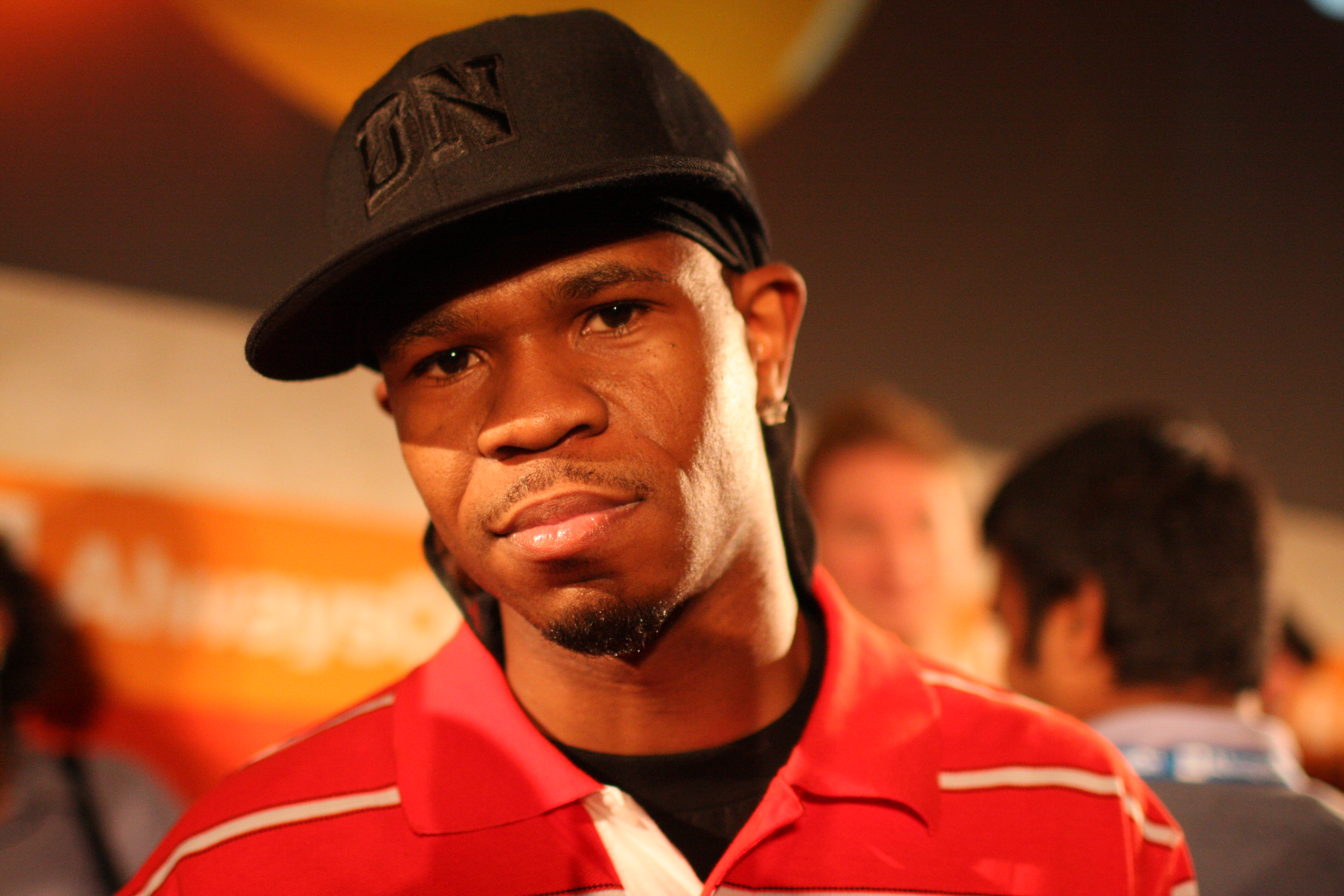
- Chamillionaire at AlwaysOn Music Artists on July 24, 2008.
Awards and nominations
Award	Wins	Nominations
American Music Awards	0	1
BET	0	1
BET Hip Hop	2	6
Grammy	1	2
MTV VMA	1	1
People's Choice	0	1
Ozone Awards	2	4

Totals (Note: Certain award groups do not simply award one winner. They acknowledge several different recipients, have runners-up, and have third place. Since this is a specific recognition and is different from losing an award, runner-up mentions are considered wins in this award tally. For simplification and to avoid errors, each award in this list has been presumed to have had a prior nomination.)
- Wins: 7
- Nominations: 16

Chamillionaire is an American hip hop rapper, record executive, CEO and entrepreneur. His first album, The Sound of Revenge, was released on November 22, 2005. It spawned three singles: "Turn It Up", "Ridin'" and "Grown and Sexy". The album was certified Platinum by the Recording Industry Association of America (RIAA). Chamillionaire's second album, Ultimate Victory, was released on September 18, 2007. It spawned two singles: "Hip Hop Police" and "The Evening News". The album did not receive a certification.

In 2006, Chamillionaire received ten nominations and won four, including Rookie of the Year and Viewer's Choice Award (Wireless People's Champ) at the BET Hip Hop Awards; Best Rap Video at the MTV Video Music Awards. In 2007, Chamillionaire received four nominations and won one, Best Rap Performance by a Duo or Group at the Grammy Awards. In 2008, Chamillionaire received two nominations and won one, Best Mixtape/Street Album at the Ozone Awards. Overall, Chamillionaire has won 6 awards from 16 nominations.

== American Music Awards ==
The American Music Awards is an annual awards ceremony created by Dick Clark in 1973. Chamillionaire has been nominated once.

Year	Nominee / work	Award	Result
2006	Chamillionaire	Favorite Breakthrough Artist	Nominated

== BET Awards ==
The BET Awards were established in 2001 by the Black Entertainment Television network to celebrate African Americans and other minorities in music, acting, sports, and other fields of entertainment. The awards are presented annually and broadcast live on BET. Chamillionaire has been nominated once.

Year	Nominee / work	Award	Result
2006	Chamillionaire	Best New Artist	Nominated

== BET Hip Hop Awards ==
The BET Hip Hop Awards are hosted annually by BET for hip hop performers, producers, and music video directors. Chamillionaire has won two awards from six nominations.

Year	Nominee / work	Award	Result
2006	"Ridin'"	Hip Hop Track of the Year	Nominated
2006	Chamillionaire	Rookie of the Year	Won
2006	Chamillionaire	Hip Hop MVP of the Year	Nominated
2006	Ridin'	Best Collaboration	Nominated
2006	Chamillionaire	Viewer's Choice Award (Wireless People's Champ)	Won
2007	"Hip Hop Police"	Best Hip-Hop Video	Nominated

== Grammy Awards ==
The Grammy Awards are awarded annually by the National Academy of Recording Arts and Sciences. Chamillionaire has won one award from two nominations.

Year	Nominee / work	Award	Result
2007	"Ridin'"	Best Rap Performance by a Duo or Group	Won
2007	"Ridin'"	Best Rap Song	Nominated

== MTV Video Music Awards ==
The MTV Video Music Awards were established in 1984 by MTV to celebrate the top music videos of the year. Chamillionaire has won one award.

Year	Nominee / work	Award	Result
2006	"Ridin'"	Best Rap Video	Won

== Ozone Awards ==
The Ozone Awards is an annual award ceremony that recognizes Southern hip hop. Chamillionaire has won two awards from four nominations.

Year	Nominee / work	Award	Result
2006	"Ridin'"	Best Video	Won
2007	"Doe Boy Fresh"	Best Video	Nominated
2008	"Hip Hop Police"	Best Video	Nominated
2008	Mixtape Messiah 3	Best Mixtape/Street Album	Won

== People's Choice Awards ==
The People's Choice Awards is an annual awards show recognizing the people and the work of popular culture. Chamillionaire has been nominated once.

Year	Nominee / work	Award	Result
2006	"Ridin'"	Favorite Hip Hop Song	Nominated

== Teen Choice Awards ==
The Teen Choice Awards is an annual awards show that airs on the Fox television network. The awards honor the year's biggest achievements in music, movies, sports, television, fashion, and more, voted by teen viewers (ages 13 to 19). Chamillionaire had 2 nominations, and won once.

Year	Nominee / work	Award	Result
2007	"Ridin'"	Teen Choice Award for Choice Music: Rap/Hip-Hop Track	Won
2007	"Ridin'"	Teen Choice Award for Choice Music: Summer Song	Nominated
