= DJ Candlestick =

American DJ (born 1985)

- Born: Omar Barton; June 21, 1985 (age 41); Houston, Texas, United States
- Origin: Missouri City, Texas, United States
- Genre: Hip-hop
- Occupations: DJ, record producer, executive
- Instruments: Turntables; Turntable
- Years active: 2004–present
- Label: ChopNotSlop ENT. (2009–present)
- Website: www.chopnotslop.com

Omar Barton (born June 21, 1985), better known by his stage name DJ Candlestick, is an American DJ, radio personality, and record producer. He is a member of The Chopstars of the ChopNotSlop subgenre, former on-air personality for KQBT 93.7 The Beat Houston, The Choice 90.9 KTSU (his alma mater) and DJ for The Nice Guys. He is the DJ behind Chop Care as well as many other ChopNotSlop mixtapes. He is currently a mixer on Drake’s radio station Sound42 on SiriusXM.

== Biography ==
DJ Candlestick has been DJing since 2001. He is a member of The Chopstars (ChopNotSlop subgenre). He has worked at various radio stations in Houston including KTSU, and KQBT before joining Drake's Sound 42 station on SiriusXM. He was also a member of the Houston-based rap group The Nice Guys.

== ChopNotSlop Radio ==
ChopNotSlop Radio is an online radio station that specializes in ChopNotSlop music. It is the first 24 hours chopped and screwed radio station. It was created in 2008 with the intentions of helping keep the subgenre that DJ Screw had created alive. The station currently has one live show every Sunday that features OG RON C, DJ Candlestick, DJ Slim K, DJ Lil Steve and DJ hollygrove with live-on-air turntablism where they chop and screw music.

== Partial discography ==
- 2011: Chop Care: Drake OG Ron C Edition
- 2015: Little Dragon Nabuma Purple Rubberband
- 2017: Moonlight Soundtrack

== See also ==
- List of record labels
- Houston hip-hop
