= The Chopstars =

American DJ collective

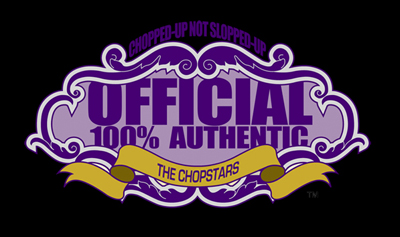

Background information
- Also known as: Chopstar DJs; Chopstars
- Origin: Houston, Texas, United States
- Genre: Chopped and screwed
- Years active: 2007−present
- Members: OG Ron C (CEO); DJ Candlestick; DJ Michael Watts; DJ Lil Steve; DJ Hollygrove (President); DJ Rucker; DJ Slim K; DJ Whut It Dew; DJ Ryan Wolf; DJ Sy Milli; Mike G; DJ Baby Chino; Chopstar Jimmy (VP); Chopstar Max Dolla; DJ SU4L; DJ Illadell; DJ Dakster (General Manager); DJ Yondon; DJ Izzy Ill; T Wrecks; Slater; DJ Kimblee; Barry Jenkins; DJ Get It Reddy; Baby Sam; DJ Siyo
- Past members: DJ Mr Rogers; DJ Blurray; DJ Rio Blackwood; DJ Chose; DJ BlackJack; DJ Surrup; DJ Slick Change; DJ Monstaaa; DJ D.A. (retired); Maktub (deceased); Big Shane (deceased); Legend [Marketing] (deceased)

The Chopstars, also known as Chopstar DJs or simply Chopstars, are a collective that include American DJs and turntablists that perform chopped and screwed remixes of popular music under Chop Not Slop Ent. Their "ChopNotSlop" remixed albums includes Drake's Take Care, Little Dragon's Nabuma Rubberband, Metro Boomin and 21 Savage's Savage Mode II, and Brent Faiyaz's Wasteland. Created by Swishahouse Records co-founder OG Ron C, DJ Lil Steve, DJ Candlestick, and DJ Hollygrove. It is a homage to the late DJ Screw. The motto of The Chopstars is "Keeping DJ Screw alive since 2001" and "Dedicated to the memory of DJ Screw." Notable members include DJ Candlestick, DJ Lil Steve, Mike G (a member of Odd Future), DJ Ryan Wolf the official DJ of the Cleveland Browns, Grammy winning DJ, DJ Hollygrove formerly of KQBT, and Academy Award-winning director Barry Jenkins. On November 4, 2022, the Chopstars received a proclamation from then Houston Mayor Sylvester Turner declaring July 1 The Chopstars Day.

== In mainstream media ==
ChopNotSlop has been in mainstream media on several occasions. In 2005, Houston rapper Chamillionaire released his multi-platinum album The Sound Of Revenge in which a Chopped and Screwed version was also released with mixes by OG Ron C. To date the ChopNotSlop version has sold over 486,000 copies. In 2010 after meeting OG Ron C in Toronto rapper Drake started giving attention to ChopNotSlop via interviews and Twitter updates. On Sept 19, 2011, Drake announced his second album by tweeting "Take Care, Take Care Birthday Edition, Take Care OG Ron C Edition...10.24.11" Chopstar DJ Mixtapes have also been featured in the LA Times Music Section, as well as The New York Times Music Section. OG Ron C's ChopNotSlop version of the song "Southern Takeover" by Chamillionaire was played in the background of the warehouse scene on the NBC show The Office (Season 2. Ep15 "Boys and Girls"). The Chopstars have been the subject to many article relating to the art form of ChopNotSlop.

On January 27, 2015 OG Ron C and DJ Candlestick of The Chopstars teamed up with Little Dragon and Adult Swim to officially release a FREE ChopNotSlop remix of Nabuma Rubberband which is being distributed via Cartoon Network's Adult Swim website. In February 2017, director Barry Jenkins connected with OG Ron C and DJ Candlestick to release a ChopNotSlop version of the Moonlight soundtrack.

=== Chopstar DJs ===
OG Ron C founded the Chopstar DJs to help up and coming Chopped and Screwed DJs. He first started with DJ Lil Steve who has been his protégé since 2005. In 2008 he met and brought on DJ Candlestick. In 2009 he added DJ Hollygrove and DJ Chose, a well known College and Texas Club Scene DJ/producer/artist. DJ Chose is a member of the group Brook Gang Music that OG Ron C also manages. In 2009 he hooked back up with his old Swishahouse right-hand-man Michael '5000' Watts and released "The Return Of The Realest."

=== ChopNotSlop Radio and App ===
ChopNotSlop Radio is an online radio station that was created in 2008. It boasts as the "Worlds First Chopped and Screwed Radio Station" which is dedicated to keeping DJ Screw Music alive. The current broadcast format is block programming is regular singles ChopNotSlop in the similar format of a terrestrial radio station. The stream can be listened to via the ChopNotSlop App on Android or any iDevice.

== Notable members ==
=== DJs ===
- OG Ron C - Co-founder of Swishahouse, member of OVO Sound, producer of TSU on Drake’s Certified Lover Boy album.
- Slim K - The man behind the Slim K slowdowns. Creator of Metro Boomin and 21 Savage's Savage Mode II ChopNotSlop Remix.
- DJ Hollygrove - Former On-Air DJ KQBT. 93.7 The Beat Houston, currently PD for Core DJ Radio show on Shade 45
- DJ Candlestick member of OVO Sound, former on-air DJ for KQBT, current co-host of the ChopNotSlop Show Sundays on Sound 42 on Sirius XM
- DJ Ryan Wolf, official DJ for the NFL’s Cleveland Browns and on air DJ for WENZ.
- Mike G, former member of Odd Future
- Barry Jenkins Collaborated with DJ Candlestick for the official ChopNotSlop release of Moonlight (2016 film) and If Beale Street Could Talk (film) soundtracks.

== Discography ==
- F-Action 1-71 (1995–present)
- The Sound of Revenge (2006)
- Chop Care (2011)
- Channel Purple (2012)
- God Forgives, I Chop (2012)
- Based on a T.R.U. Story: ChopNotSlop (2013)
- Nabuma Purple Rubberband (2015)
- Moonlight Soundtrack (2017)
- Savage Mode II (2020)
- Heroes & Villains (2023)
- Wasteland (2023)
- Made Mistakes (2024)

== See also ==
- Beast Mode
