= Houston hip-hop =

Music genre in Houston, Texas

- Stylistic origins: Southern hip-hop; deep soul; blues; gospel; psychedelia
- Cultural origins: 1980s, Houston

Subgenres
- chopped and screwed

Houston hip-hop is hip-hop music from the city of Houston, Texas. The city's earliest commercially released hip-hop emerged in the later 1980s, with Rap-A-Lot Records and the Geto Boys being among its earliest successes. In the 1990s, Houston's hip-hop scene expanded and became increasingly distinctive, owing to the local acclaim earned by DJ Screw and his eponymous chopped and screwed style. After Screw's death in 2000, Michael "5000" Watts and his label Swishahouse brought screwed music to mainstream attention; the peak of this wave came when several of Houston's leading rappers put out commercially successful albums in 2005.

== Style ==
The sound of Houston hip-hop is heavily derived from the city's history as the home of chopped and screwed music. Screwed music is defined by its slow pace in comparison to other hip-hop subgenres; the process of "screwing" a song involves playing it at a slow pace, creating a psychedelic soundscape in which drums are intensified and vocals distorted. Meanwhile, "chopping" involves the isolation and repetition of short snippets of lyrics. The slowness of Houston hip-hop has been described as representative of the city's hot, humid weather and the heavy traffic on its roadways. It has also been compared to the "slowed" feeling of intoxication on lean, a codeine-based drug that often features prominently in Houston's rap lyrics. Other strains of Houston hip-hop—especially those that predate screwed music—have been described as a combination of West Coast gangsta rap with traditionally Southern music genres such as soul and blues. Houston rap in this latter category has been closely tied to hardcore hip-hop and horrorcore.

Houston hip-hop is also known for its distinctive slang and themes. Terms like "trill", "swisha", "candy paint", and "plex" have been identified as examples of local Houston slang that achieved wider popularity through rap music. The city's hip-hop scene is also closely linked to cars; customizing one's vehicle and driving around in it recreationally is a popular pastime in the city, and many influential Houston rap songs discuss the practice. Independent Houston rappers have also historically used their cars to market their music, playing it loudly while they drive and selling tapes from their trunks.

An ethos of independence is another characteristic aspect of Houston's hip-hop scene. In addition to local performers and record labels, Houston hosts a network of local studios, designers, and manufacturers that make it possible for artists to record, release, and promote their own music without being dependent on the major label ecosystem.

== History ==
=== Beginnings: Rap-A-Lot and gangsta groups ===
Some of the first hip-hop to emerge from Houston came from the South Park neighborhood in the 1980s. Houston's earliest rappers were primarily battle rappers who performed in venues like the Rhinestone Wrangler, and had comparatively little interest in recording music. However, a handful of local acts—such as K-Rino and his trio, Real Chill—published New York–style hip-hop songs such as 1986's "Rockin' It". Other Houston rap groups in this early wave included Royal Flush and Triple Threat.

The first Houston hip-hop to achieve notable commercial success was that released through Rap-A-Lot Records. This label was founded by James Prince, at the time a used car salesman, in collaboration with software engineer Cliff Blodget. Prince initially established the label as a vehicle to publish the music that his younger brother was creating, as part of a group known as the Ghetto Boys. However, most of the group's early members departed before long, forcing Prince to assemble a new lineup. In the ensuing years, the group would stabilize as a trio, comprising Scarface, Willie D, and Bushwick Bill. Alongside this shift, Prince also changed the spelling of the group's name, dubbing them the Geto Boys. The early work of the Geto Boys featured an East Coast–inflected style, but by their 1989 album Grip It! On That Other Level, they had adopted a more Southern sound based on prominent basslines, blues guitar, and vocal samples. Inspired by the group name and the recent success of Straight Outta Compton, the Geto Boys embraced gangsta rap in their lyrics. The Geto Boys were also early adopters of horrorcore, an extreme rap subgenre that was pioneered by fellow Houston rapper Ganksta N-I-P. Though N-I-P would not release music under his own name until 1992's The South Park Psycho, he was closely affiliated with the Geto Boys and ghostwrote their 1991 horrorcore song "Chuckie".

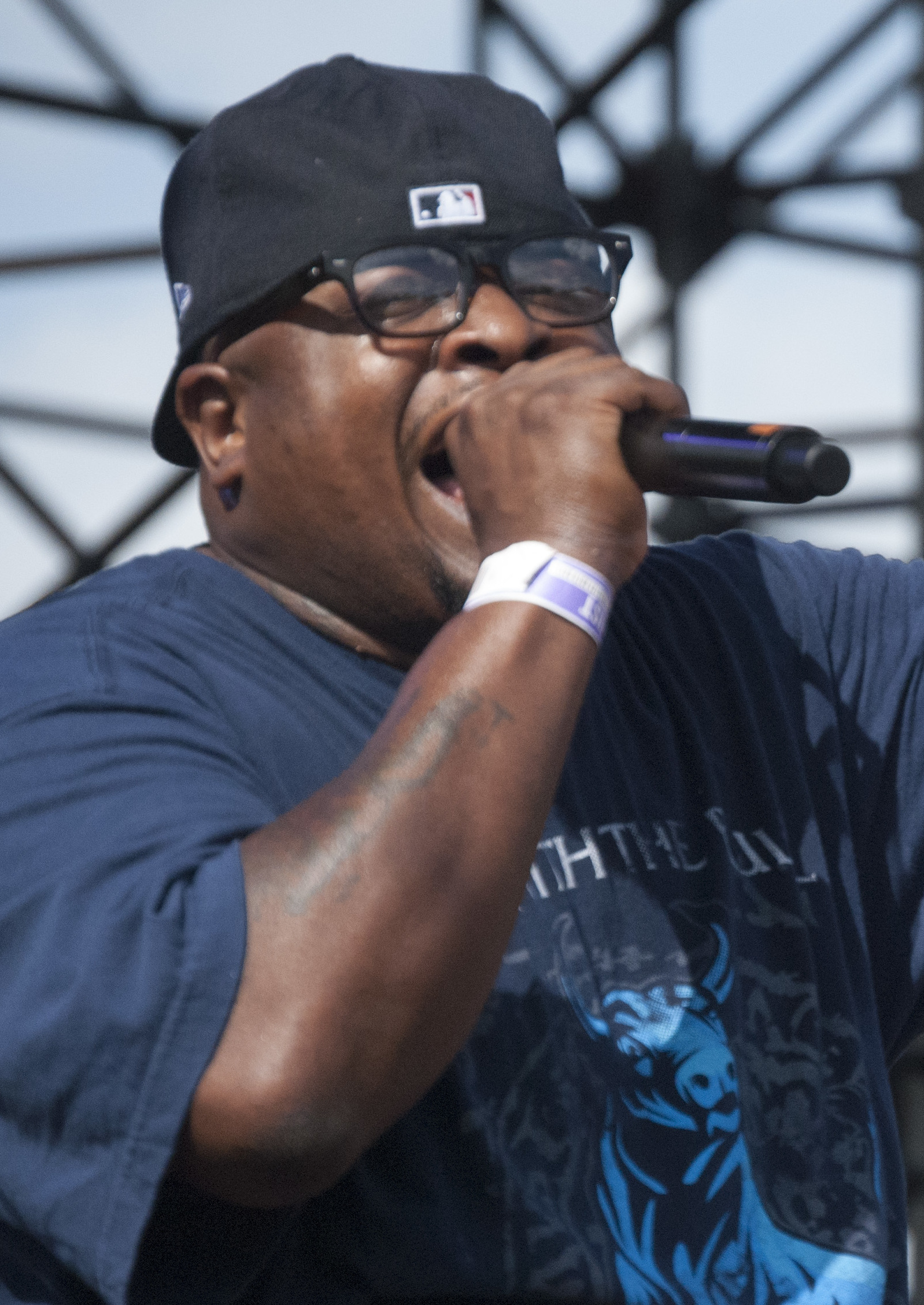
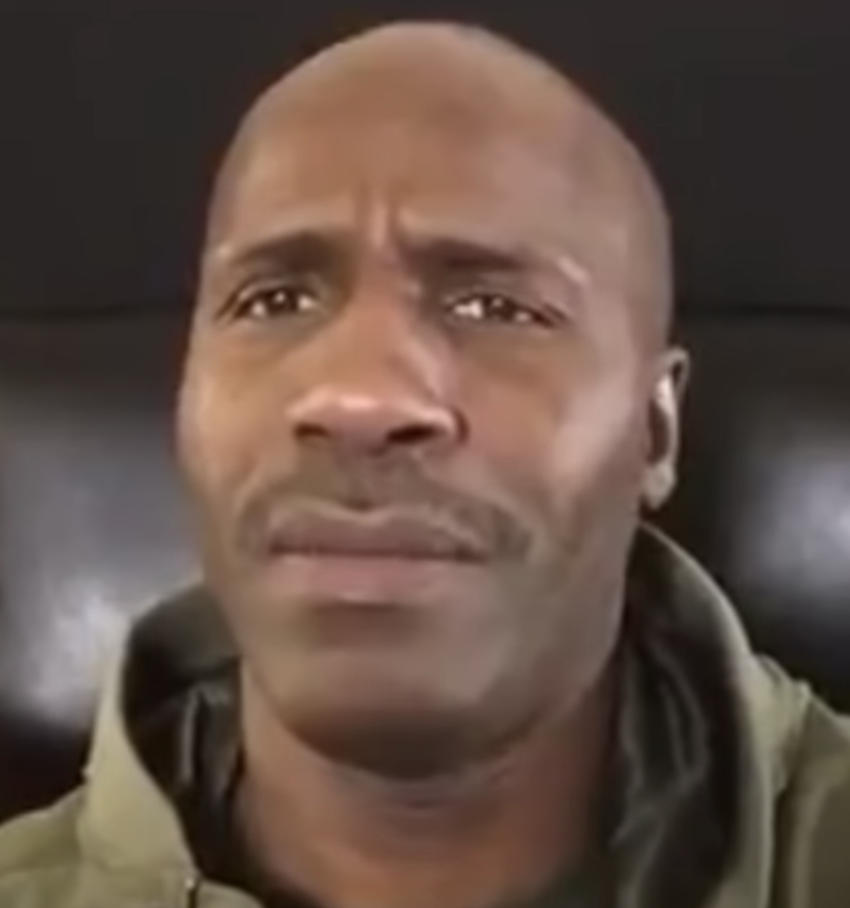
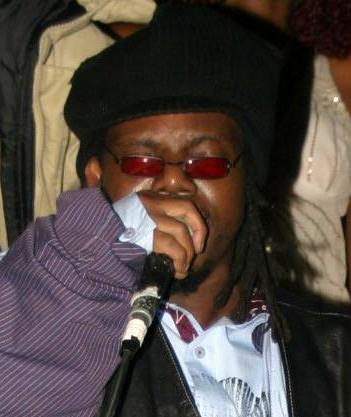
The classic lineup of the Geto Boys comprises Scarface, Willie D, and Bushwick Bill (pictured from left to right).

After achieving local success with their first two albums, the Geto Boys caught the attention of New York producer Rick Rubin, who signed them to his Def American label to release the 1990 remix album The Geto Boys. However, because of the album's offensive lyrical content, distributor Geffen Records cut its ties with Def American, who in turn ended their business relationship with Rap-A-Lot. This controversy only placed further attention on the Geto Boys, and so when they released their next album—1991's We Can't Be Stopped—they rose to stil greater prominence. We Can't Be Stopped also included the single "Mind Playing Tricks on Me", which was the Geto Boys' highest-charting song and has been credited with proving Texas' ability to produce meaningful, successful hip-hop.

The success that Rap-A-Lot attained with the Geto Boys led to the establishment of a growing independent hip-hop ecosystem in Houston throughout the 1990s—including not just other record labels, but also recording studios like Digital Services, distributors like Southwest Wholesale, and graphic designers such as Pen & Pixel. One significant label to have emerged during this wave was Suave House Records. Suave House's founder, Memphis-born entrepreneur Tony Draper, convinced Memphis duo 8Ball & MJG to move to Houston and sign to his label. Also migrating to Houston in the early 1990s was the duo UGK, who had begun their career in the smaller city of Port Arthur. UGK put out a sequence of progressively more successful projects during the decade, culminating in 1996's Ridin' Dirty, which is credited with bringing wider attention to a number of Houston slang terms. The duo comprised Bun B, who is regarded as one of Houston rap's most skilled lyricists, and rapper–producer Pimp C, who helped shape the regional style by crafting laid-back beats inspired by gospel and blues. UGK further expanded awareness of Houston hip-hop with their featured appearance on Jay-Z's 2000 single "Big Pimpin'".

=== The rise of chopped and screwed music ===
[In the early 1990s,] every time I would go to New York with something I thought was original, they was like 'Aw, man, we was doing that in '84.' But when I first brought a screwed-up tape to New York, they couldn't say they'd heard that before. That was original to Houston.

— Bun B

One of Houston's most distinctive local hip-hop styles is chopped and screwed music. This style, invented by and named after DJ Screw circa 1991, is defined by slowing records down and looping short passages to create a psychedelic effect. Screwed music is closely associated with the consumption of lean, a drug cocktail centered upon codeine-based cough syrup; Screw himself was a heavy user of lean, and his collaborators and listeners also consumed and promoted it extensively. During the 1990s, Screw self-released numerous mixtapes, first from his home in South Park and later from a store called Screwed Up Records and Tapes. Initially, the "Screw tapes" simply consisted of screwed remixes of previously released tracks, assembled to order; however, as Screw's business grew, he began to incorporate freestyles from his customers and neighborhood associates as well. The group of rappers who would appear on Screw tapes came to be known as the Screwed Up Click. Some of the Click's most prominent rappers included E.S.G., Lil' Keke, and Fat Pat. Other members included Big Moe, a rapper and singer who was one of the group's most vocal lean enthusiasts; inaugural members Big Hawk and Al-D; and Lil' Flip, a later addition who would eventually parlay his time in the Click into solo success in the 2000s. Because Screw's music frequently involved unlicensed remixing of other artists' material, he received little attention from major labels. Some of his only projects to go through the traditional record label ecosystem were 3 'n the Mornin' and its sequel, which were distributed through Priority Records. Nevertheless, Screw still attained thousands of local sales, and his eponymous style remained popular even after he died of a drug overdose in 2000.

Screw's success and influence engendered a number of imitators throughout Houston, the most prominent of whom was the North Side's Michael "5000" Watts. Initially a DJ for 97.9 The Box, a local radio station specializing in hip-hop, Watts began producing his own screwed music in 1996. Watts' connections to the mass media helped him increase the profile of screwed music more generally, and his commercial success with a style that had been pioneered on Houston's South Side exacerbated the longtime rivalry between the two regions of the city. Nevertheless, by the turn of the millennium, North Side and South Side artists were beginning to reconcile. An early collaboration between the two camps was the 1999 track "Braids n' Fades", featuring the North Side's Slim Thug alongside Screwed Up Click member E.S.G. Lil' Flip followed in 2001 with an appearance on OG Ron C's tape I-45. After Screw's death, Watts came to be recognized as the primary living promoter of screwed music, with some writers describing him explicitly as Screw's de facto successor.

Not all of Screw's associates utilized the screwed style in their own music. For instance, although Devin the Dude was identified by writer Jonathan Abrams as a member of the Screwed Up Click, his own musical style is best known for its lighthearted, self-deprecating humor.

=== Swishahouse and Houston's mainstream breakthrough ===
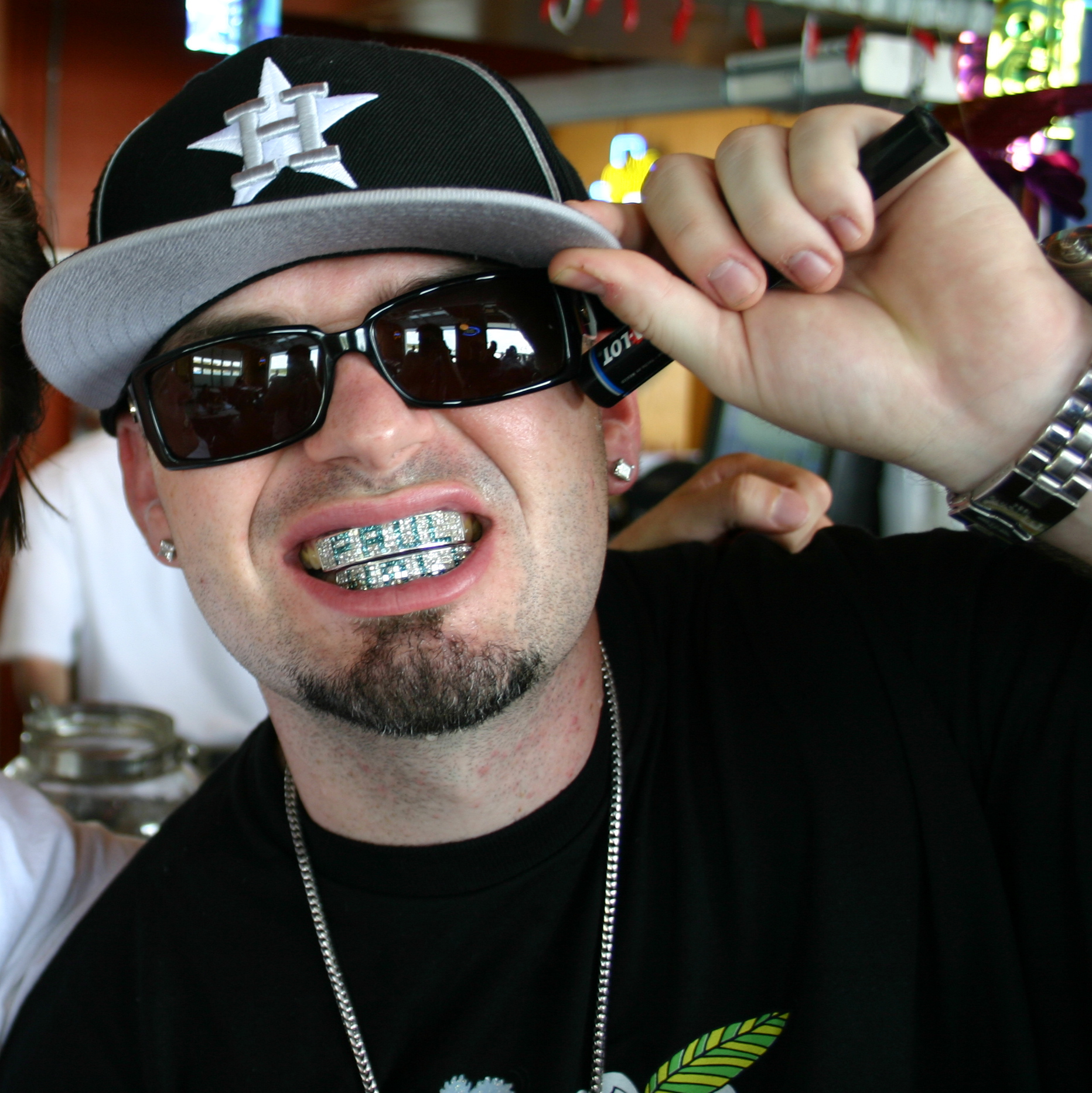
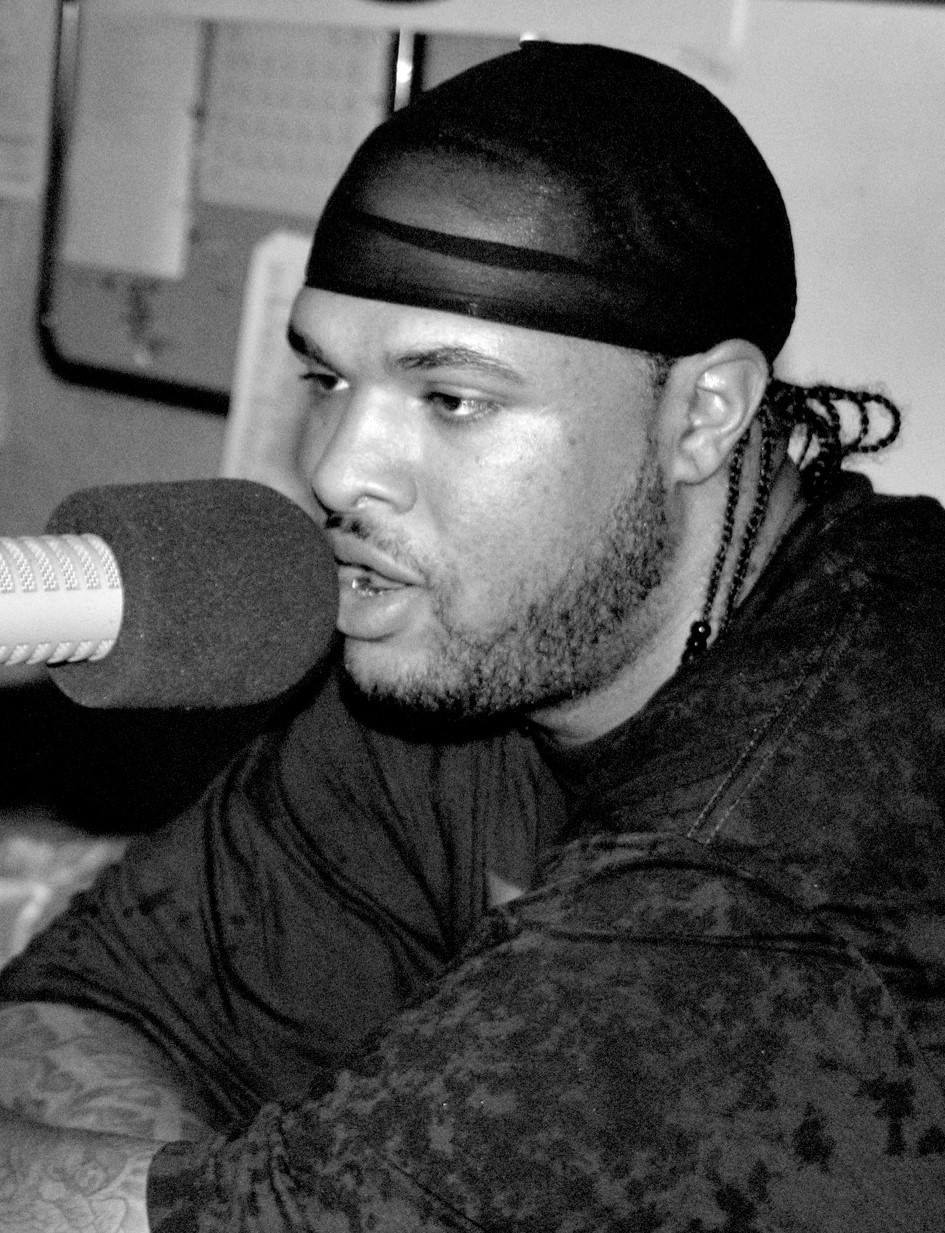
"Still Tippin'" by Mike Jones was one of the first hit songs from Houston's 2004–05 wave of popularity. The song featured Paul Wall (left) and Slim Thug (right).

In addition to producing his own music, Watts—alongside OG Ron C—co-founded the record label Swishahouse in 1997. In the coming years, Swishahouse began signing up-and-coming rappers from the North Side of Houston. Slim Thug was one of the label's first signees, as were Paul Wall and Chamillionaire. All three were prominently featured on the 1999 compilation album The Day Hell Broke Loose, Swishahouse's first project to be distributed nationally. However, many members of Swishahouse's roster departed the label in the early 2000s, preferring to return to independent distribution. Several Swishahouse alumni went on to release commercially successful independent projects in the early 2000s, with a prominent example being Get Ya Mind Correct, the 2002 collaborative mixtape by Wall and Chamillionaire.

Without many of his original signees, Watts pivoted his attention to a more recent recruit to the label: Mike Jones. Jones was initially best known for his flashy style of self-promotion, such as by including his phone number and email address in song lyrics, but he became a prominent member of the Swishahouse lineup who featured extensively on the label's 2004 compilation The Day Hell Broke Loose, Vol. 2: Major Without a Major Deal. During this same period, Swishahouse signed a distribution deal with the Warner Bros. imprint Asylum Records, creating the conditions for Houston hip-hop to reach a wider audience than previously possible. The first beneficiary of this deal was the 2004 single "Still Tippin'", a collaboration between Jones, Wall, and Slim Thug. "Still Tippin'" proved to be a breakthrough hit that cast a spotlight on Houston's rap scene and showcased local stylistic traits such as relaxed vocal deliveries and car-themed lyrics.

Outside of "Still Tippin'", Lil' Flip also earned a platinum record in 2004, and the Houston rap scene rose to even greater heights of mainstream prominence in 2005. Mike Jones' debut studio album, Who Is Mike Jones?, became a number-one hit on Billboard's Top R&B/Hip-Hop Albums chart and earned its own platinum certification. Paul Wall followed with his own number-one album, The Peoples Champ, and Chamillionaire's The Sound of Revenge was carried to platinum status by its successful single "Ridin'".

=== Recent history ===
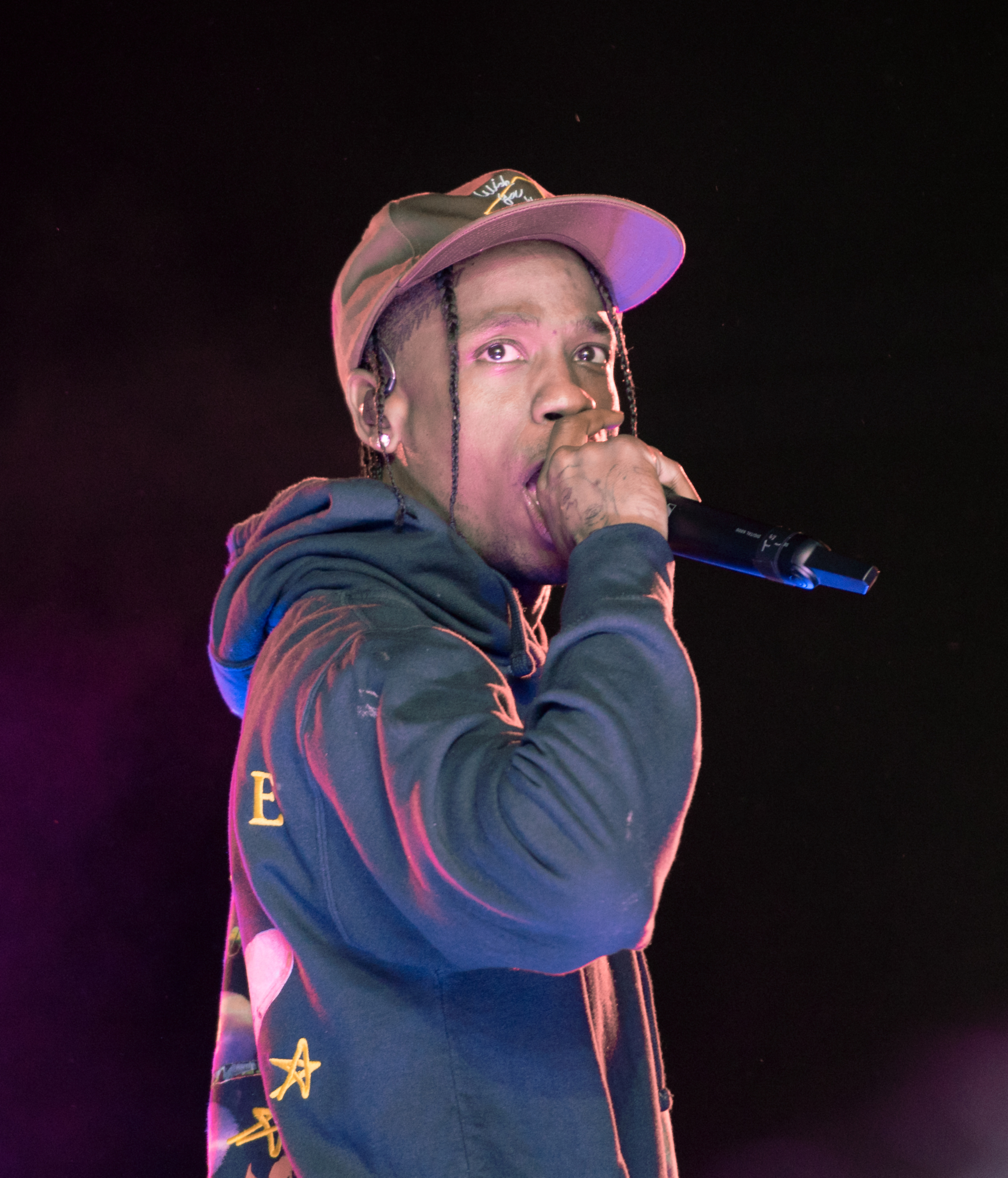
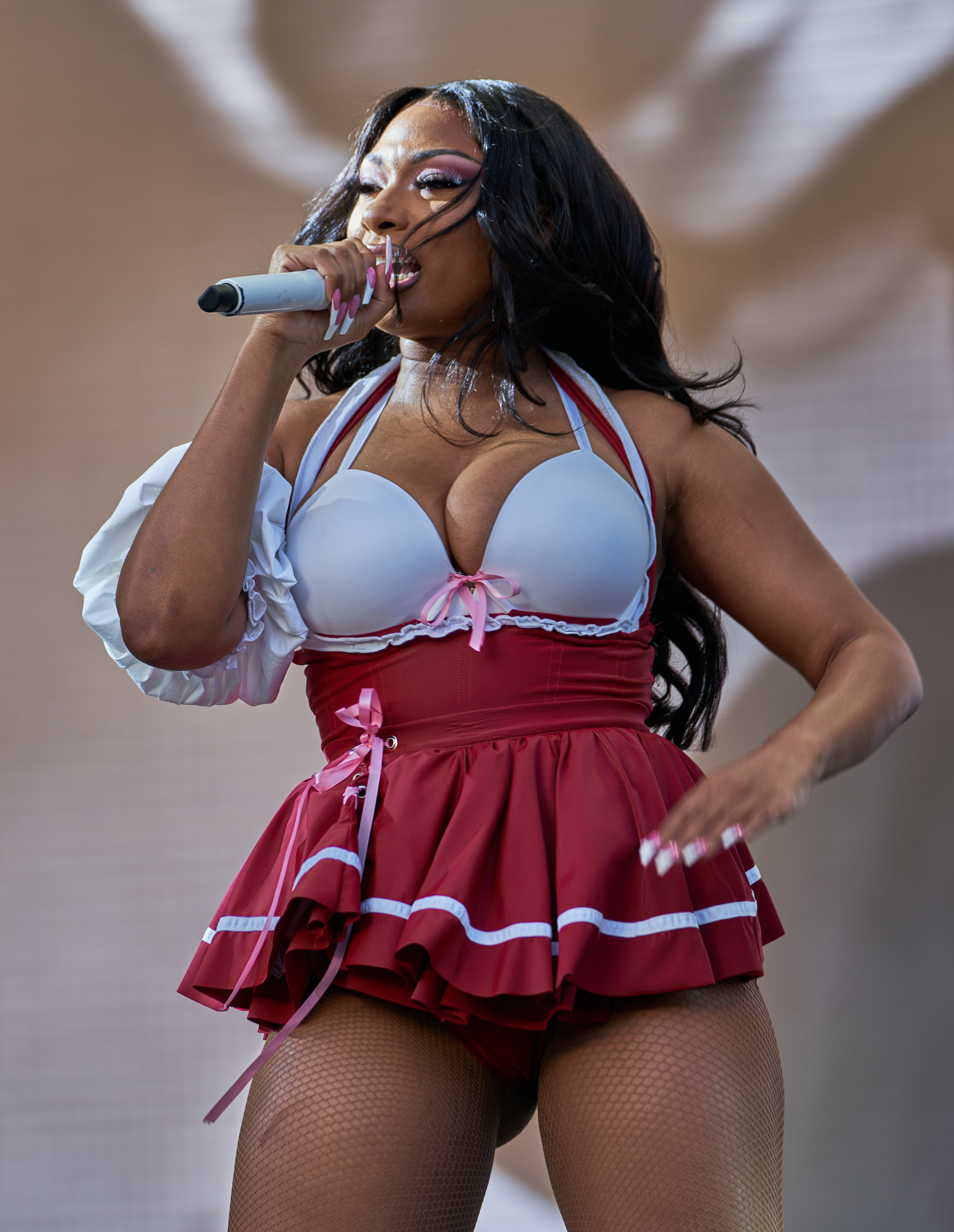
Travis Scott (left) and Megan Thee Stallion (right) are among Houston's biggest hip-hop stars of the 2010s.

Despite the heights of success it earned in 2005, Houston's hip-hop scene did not retain its central position in the music world, and by 2015 journalist Ben Westhoff opined that the city was "no longer a strong incubator of chart-topping talent". Nevertheless, Houston has continued to produce some hip-hop stars in the years since the Swishahouse era. One of Houston's most prominent rappers of the 2010s is Travis Scott. After dropping out of college to pursue music, Scott caught the attention of established hip-hop figures such as Kanye West, and he rose to prominence through an appearance on West's Cruel Summer in 2012. Scott's profile continued to rise throughout the decade, and by the time he released Astroworld in 2018, Jonah Weiner of Rolling Stone described him as "the most intensely beloved hip-hop star to emerge since Drake". His music is characterized by extensive use of digital processing effects on his vocals, creating an "opulent" style that has been described as influenced by Future. Though these collaborators and influences come from outside of Houston, Scott still showcases ties to his hometown by featuring local venues and cultural signifiers in his lyrics and music videos. Another prominent Houston rapper to emerge in the 2010s is Megan Thee Stallion, who achieved public attention through a series of freestyles and EPs between 2016 and 2019. Her style is characterized by fast-paced lyrics and self-confident, sexual subject matter.

== Bibliography ==
- Abrams, Jonathan (2022). The Come Up: An Oral History of the Rise of Hip-Hop. Crown. ISBN 9781984825155.
- Lynch, Jamie (2010). "The Long, Hot Grind: How Houston Engineered an Industry of Independence". In Hess, Mickey (ed.). Hip Hop in America: A Regional Guide. Vol. 2. ABC-CLIO. ISBN 9780313343223.
- Sarig, Roni (2007). Third Coast: Outkast, Timbaland, and How Hip-Hop Became a Southern Thing. Da Capo Press. ISBN 9780306814303.
- Westhoff, Ben (2011). Dirty South: Outkast, Lil Wayne, Soulja Boy, and the Southern Rappers who Reinvented Hip-Hop. Chicago Review Press. ISBN 9781569766064.
