= The Day Hell Broke Loose 3 =

Mixtape by Swishahouse
- Released: October 17, 2006
- Genre: Southern hip-hop
- Length: 54:12
- Label: Swishahouse
- Producer: Mr. Lee

Swishahouse chronology
The Day Hell Broke Loose 2 (2004)	The Day Hell Broke Loose 3 (2006)

Professional ratings
Review scores
Source	Rating
AllHipHop	3.5/5 stars
AllMusic	4/5 stars
RapReviews	6/10

The Day Hell Broke Loose 3 is a mixtape by American hip-hop DJ Michael "5000" Watts. It was released on October 17, 2006 via Swishahouse. Mostly produced by Mr. Lee, it features contributions from Lil' Keke, Archie Lee, Yung Redd, Coota Bang, E-Class, Paul Wall, Crys Wall, Juelz Santana, Scarface, Trouble, Webbie, Willie D and Z-Ro. The album debuted at number 72 on the Billboard 200 chart, selling 13,000 copies in the United States in its first-week. An accompanying music video was released for the album's lead single "How Hustler's Do It".

== Track listing ==
No.	Title	Length
1.	"Intro" (performed by DJ Michael "5000" Watts)	1:17
2.	"Swervin" (performed by Lil' Keke, Archie Lee and Coota Bang)	4:01
3.	"On What We On" (performed by Juelz Santana, Lil' Keke and Archie Lee)	3:48
4.	"How Hustler's Do It" (performed by Webbie, Lil' Keke and Yung Redd)	3:54
5.	"The Hood Luv Me" (performed by Yung Redd, E-Class and Willie D.)	4:13
6.	"So Fly" (performed by Paul Wall, Lil' Keke, Archie Lee and Crys Wall)	4:05
7.	"Call Me What U Want" (performed by Yung Redd, E-Class and Paul Wall)	4:12
8.	"Wish U Well" (performed by Lil' Keke, Coota Bang and Archie Lee)	4:17
9.	"Gangsta" (performed by Scarface, Lil' Keke and Coota Bang)	4:11
10.	"They Still Don't Know" (performed by Paul Wall, Lil' Keke and Archie Lee)	4:21
11.	"Truth Be Told" (performed by Z-Ro, Trouble and Lil' Keke)	5:24
12.	"Still Shining" (performed by Lil' Keke, Yung Redd and E-Class)	4:20
13.	"Words from a G..." (performed by Lil' Keke)	0:48
14.	"In These Streets" (performed by Lil' Keke and Crys Wall)	5:21
Total length:		54:12

== Charts ==
Chart (2006)	Peak position
US Billboard 200	72
US Top R&B/Hip-Hop Albums (Billboard)	12
