= Grown and Sexy =

Single by Chamillionaire

from the album The Sound of Revenge
- Released: June 11, 2006 (US); November 20, 2006 (UK)
- Genre: Pop rap, R&B
- Length: 4:03
- Label: Universal, Chamillitary
- Songwriter: H. Seriki
- Producer: The Beat Bullies

Chamillionaire singles chronology
"Get Up" (2006)	"Grown and Sexy" (2006)	"That Girl" (2006)

"Grown and Sexy" is the third US single and second international single from Chamillionaire's album, The Sound of Revenge. It was released domestically in June 2006.

Chamillionaire's previous singles—including his guest performance on Ciara's "Get Up"—have proven to be successful, mainly his Billboard Hot 100 number one single, "Ridin'." However, "Grown and Sexy" failed to reach any domestic charts beyond Rhythmic, but did chart in the UK Singles chart at number 35, much lesser than that of "Ridin," which peaked at number two. It charted on the In the Piczo Countdown at number seven In November 2006.

== Track listing ==
CD1

1. "Grown and Sexy" (clean album version)
2. "Turn it Up" (radio edit)

CD2

1. "Grown and Sexy" (explicit album version)
2. "Turn It Up" (Dizzee Rascal remix)
3. "Ridin"
4. "Grown and Sexy" (instrumental)

Promo

1. "Grown and Sexy" (Radio Edit)
2. "Grown and Sexy" (Radio Edit - No Intro)

== Charts ==
=== Weekly charts ===
Chart (2006)	Peak position
Finland (Suomen virallinen lista)	19
Ireland (IRMA)	28
New Zealand (Recorded Music NZ)	21
Scottish Singles Sales (Official Charts)	45
UK Singles (Official Charts)	35
UK Hip Hop/R&B (Official Charts)	6
US Rhythmic Airplay (Billboard)	28

=== Year-end charts ===
Chart (2006)	Position
UK Urban (Music Week)	36
