= Michael "5000" Watts =

American hip-hop DJ and entrepreneur

Background information
- Born: June 7, 1971
- Origin: Houston, Texas
- Died: January 30, 2026 (aged 54)
- Genres: Chopped and screwed; Houston hip-hop
- Occupations: DJ; record executive
- Years active: 1996–2026
- Label: Swishahouse

Michael "5000" Watts (June 7, 1971 – January 30, 2026) was an American DJ, record executive, and entrepreneur who co-founded the record label Swishahouse. He is credited as one of the primary figures responsible for promoting Houston hip-hop—particularly its characteristic chopped and screwed style—to a national audience in the early 2000s.

== Biography ==
Watts was raised in the North Side of Houston. In his teenage years, he began work as a DJ who performed live sets and sold mixtapes, before parlaying this early independent career into a radio DJ role at 97.9 The Box. While working for this station in 1996, Watts began producing chopped and screwed mixtapes, inspired by the earlier work of DJ Screw. Watts' role at The Box also placed him in contact with OG Ron C, with whom he co-founded the record label Swishahouse in 1997.

In contrast to DJ Screw, who preferred to self-release his music on cassettes, Watts promoted his chopped and screwed music extensively on radio and the Internet. He also used CDs and software like Pro Tools to assemble higher-fidelity material. Watts' adoption of a style so heavily inspired by Screw, and the commercial success he attained with it, made him the target of resentment from Screw-affiliated artists from Houston's South Side. Nevertheless, after Screw died in 2000, Watts came to be seen as the primary living exponent of chopped and screwed music. He began releasing screwed remixes of major-label albums through a deal with Universal Records, the first one being 8Ball & MJG's Space Age 4 Eva, and expanded his radio show to be syndicated across five Southern cities.

In the late 1990s and early 2000s, Watts released a number of compilation albums through Swishahouse; the first to be nationally distributed was 1999's The Day Hell Broke Loose. Watts, and the stable of artists he signed to Swishahouse, have been credited with bringing Houston hip-hop to the explosive success it enjoyed in 2005. In particular, Slim Thug, Paul Wall, Mike Jones, and Chamillionaire have all been named as Houston rappers who flourished through their connections to Watts and Swishahouse.

On January 30, 2026, Watts died at the age of 54 from a torsades de pointes. He was buried on February 16.

== Discography ==
List of albums and mixtapes chopped and screwed by Michael "5000" Watts
| Year | Artist | Album |
|---|---|---|
| 1999 | Swishahouse | The Day Hell Broke Loose |
| 1999 | PSK 13 | Pay Like You Weigh 5000 |
| 2000 | Baby Luke | Ballers Don't Complain |
| 2000 | I.B.G. | We Ballin |
| 2000 | Eminem | The Marshall Mathers LP |
| 2000 | Lone Star Ridaz | Lone Star Ridaz |
| 2000 | Mobb Figgaz | Wise Guyz on tha Rise... |
| 2000 | Archie Lee | Da Mista Mista – Archie Lee of da Swishahouse |
| 2001 | 8Ball & MJG | Space Age 4 Eva |
| 2001 | Big Tiger AKA Big Tike | I Came to Wreck |
| 2002 | Devin the Dude | Just Tryin' ta Live |
| 2002 | E.S.G. & Slim Thug | Boss Hogg Outlaws |
| 2002 | Geto Boys | Greatest Hits |
| 2002 | Paul Wall & Chamillionaire | Get Ya Mind Correct |
| 2002 | Scarface | Greatest Hits |
| 2002 | Slim Thug | Underground Hoggin' |
| 2002 | Tela | Double Dose |
| 2003 | David Banner | Mississippi: The Album |
| 2003 | Mike Jones & Magno | 1st Round Draft Picks |
| 2003 | Pimp C presents... Lil' Boosie and Webbie | Ghetto Stories |
| 2003 | Scarface | Balls and My Word |
| 2003 | Swishahouse | The Day Hell Broke Loose 2 |
| 2003 | Three 6 Mafia | Da Unbreakables |
| 2004 | 8Ball & MJG | Living Legends |
| 2004 | Big Tymers | Big Money Heavyweight |
| 2004 | C Muphukkin Wiz | Still Crunk |
| 2004 | David Banner | MTA2: Baptized in Dirty Water |
| 2004 | Devin the Dude | The Dude |
| 2004 | Dirty South Rydaz Presents Big Tuck | Purple Hulk |
| 2004 | Juvenile | Juve the Great |
| 2004 | Lil Scrappy | The King of Crunk & BME Recordings Present: Trillville & Lil Scrappy |
| 2004 | Lil Wayne | Tha Carter |
| 2004 | Paul Wall | Chick Magnet |
| 2004 | Paul Wall | How To Be A Player |
| 2005 | Birdman | Fast Money |
| 2005 | Bone Thugs-N-Harmony | Greatest Hits |
| 2005 | Bun B | Trill |
| 2005 | Lil' Boosie & Webbie | Gangsta Musik |
| 2005 | Lil Jon | Crunk Juice |
| 2005 | Mike Jones | Who Is Mike Jones? |
| 2005 | Paul Wall | The Peoples Champ |
| 2005 | Paul Wall & Chamillionaire | Controversy Sells |
| 2005 | Pimp C | Pimpalation |
| 2005 | Slim Thug | Already Platinum |
| 2005 | Three 6 Mafia | Most Known Unknown |
| 2005 | The Game | Untold Story |
| 2005 | Tru | The Truth |
| 2005 | Twisted Black | The Life of Tommy Burns |
| 2005 | Webbie | Savage Life |
| 2005 | Ying Yang Twins | U.S.A. (United State of Atlanta) |
| 2006 | Dem Franchize Boyz | On Top of Our Game |
| 2006 | DJ Drama & Young Jeezy | Can't Ban the Snowman |
| 2006 | Korn | Chopped, Screwed, Live and Unglued |
| 2006 | Lil Wayne | Tha Carter II |
| 2006 | South Park Mexican | When Devils Strike |
| 2006 | Swishahouse | The Day Hell Broke Loose 3 |
| 2006 | Swishahouse presents Lil Keke Of Tha S.U.C. | Album B4 The Album |
| 2007 | Boss Hogg Outlawz presents Slim Thug | Houston |
| 2007 | Paul Wall | Get Money, Stay True |
| 2008 | ABN | It Is What It Is |
| 2008 | Devin the Dude | Landing Gear |
| 2008 | Three 6 Mafia | Last 2 Walk |
| 2008 | Z-Ro | Crack |
| 2009 | Boss Hogg Outlawz Presents Slim Thug | 10 Years Later: I Represent This Part .2 |
| 2009 | Lil' Keke | Universal Ghetto Pass – The Mixtape |
| 2009 | Lil' O | Tha Flood |
| 2009 | Slim Thug | Boss of All Bosses |
| 2010 | Bun B | Trill OG |
| 2010 | Lil Keke | Addicted 2 Fame |
| 2010 | Pimp C | The Naked Soul of Sweet Jones |
| 2011 | Big K.R.I.T. | Return of 4Eva |
| 2014 | J. Cole | 2014 Forest Hills Drive |
| 2015 | OG Point Blank The Bull | No Money, No Reason |
| 2017 | David Banner | #TheGodBox |
| 2019 | Mummy Club | Afterlife |
| 2019 | Slim Thug | King of the Nawf |
| 2020 | Slim Thug | Thug Life |
| 2021 | Aban | Rap Inferno |
| 2021 | Big Pokey | Sensei |
| 2025 | Slim Thug & Propain | Double Cup |
