= Turn It Up (Chamillionaire song) =

Single by Chamillionaire featuring Lil' Flip

from the album The Sound of Revenge
- Released: September 3, 2005
- Genre: Hip hop
- Length: 4:34
- Label: Universal; Chamillitary
- Songwriters: Hakeem Seriki; Wesley Weston; Scott Storch
- Producer: Scott Storch

Chamillionaire singles chronology
"Turn It Up" (2005)	"Ridin'" (2005)

"Turn It Up" is the debut single of Chamillionaire, featuring Lil' Flip. It was produced by Scott Storch. "Turn It Up" was the first single from Chamillionaire's major label debut album, The Sound of Revenge. The music video is filmed in Houston, and features cameo appearances by Crooked I, Mannie Fresh and Chamillionaire's brother Rasaq. Lil' Flip is noticed wearing a "Free Cassidy" shirt in the video, showing his support for Cassidy while he was in jail for attempted murder. This hip hop song peaked at number 41 on the Billboard Hot 100.

== Remixes and samples ==
A remix of the song which features Lil' O, HAWK and E.S.G. is featured on It's Going Down 3, a mixtape hosted by Chamillionaire with production by CHOPS and as the opening track on The Sound of Revenge bonus disc.

The lyric from the song; "Check out my track record, they say Imma track Wrecka" has been sampled by British rapper Sir-B (Imperial Squad) for the grime song "Track Wrecka" released in 2007 via Channel U.

== Charts ==
Chart (2005–2006)	Peak position
US Billboard Hot 100	41
US Hot R&B/Hip-Hop Songs (Billboard)	31
US Hot Rap Songs (Billboard)	9
US Rhythmic Airplay (Billboard)	8

== Release history ==
Release dates and formats for "Turn It Up"
Region	Date	Format	Label(s)	Ref.
United States	January 10, 2006	Mainstream airplay	Universal	
