= KTSU =

Radio station at Texas Southern University in Houston

- Houston, Texas; United States
- Broadcast area: Greater Houston
- Frequency: 90.9 MHz (HD Radio)
- Branding: The Choice

Programming
- Language: English
- Format: Jazz and public radio
- Subchannels: HD2: Urban adult contemporary

Ownership
- Owner: Texas Southern University

History
- First air date: June 23, 1972
- Call sign meaning: Texas Southern University

Technical information
- Licensing authority: FCC
- Facility ID: 65336
- Class: C3
- ERP: 18,500 watts
- HAAT: 81 meters (266 ft)
- Transmitter coordinates: 29°43′25″N 95°21′52″W

Links
- Public license information: Public file; LMS
- Webcast: Listen live
- Website: ktsuradio.com

KTSU (90.9 FM), known as "The Choice", is a variety radio station based on the campus of Texas Southern University. It was founded on June 23, 1972.

Its studios have been located on campus at the Center for Professional Media Studies since 2005, and the station's transmitter is located nearby, also on campus.
