= Swishahouse =

Hip hop collective and record label from Houston, Texas

- Parent company: The Warner Music Group
- Founded: 1997; 29 years ago
- Founder: Michael "5000" Watts; OG Ron C; G-Dash
- Status: Active
- Distributors: Asylum; Atlantic (Paul Wall); Warner Bros. (Mike Jones)
- Genre: Southern hip hop
- Country of origin: United States
- Location: Houston, Texas, U.S.
- Official website: www.swishahouse.com

Swishahouse (stylized as SwishaHouse) is a Southern hip hop record label owned and founded in Houston, Texas in 1997 by the late Michael "5000" Watts, OG Ron C and later Watts' business partner G-Dash. Known for its artist freestyles and its focus on the chopped and screwed subgenre of Southern hip hop, the record label was influential in launching the careers of artists including Paul Wall, Slim Thug, Mike Jones, and Chamillionaire.

== History ==
Swishahouse was founded in Rosewood neighborhood of Houston in 1997 by founder and President Michael "5000" Watts and OG Ron C as a response to the growing popularity of chopped and screwed music from Houston's south side, pioneered by DJ Screw. Watts released the first Swishahouse mixes in 1997. In 1999, Watts and G-Dash partnered and created Swishablast and became an official record label. Swishahouse began by distributing a mixtape series that featured chopped and slowed versions of R&B songs. The label initially began growing in popularity in the Acres Homes and Rosewood neighborhoods of North Houston.

In 2003, Swishahouse released the compilation album The Day Hell Broke Loose 2, which featured the song "Still Tippin'" by label artists Mike Jones and Paul Wall, and Swishahouse affiliate Slim Thug. The song initially achieved local success in Houston and the surrounding Southern market. Through word of mouth and the release of an X-rated music video that aired on BET: Uncut in the spring of 2004, "Still Tippin'" gained wider attention. By late 2004, the song was receiving major radio airplay, and an edited version of the video was released for broader rotation. The growing popularity of "Still Tippin'", combined with Swishahouse's independent success distributing music throughout the South, led to the label signing a national distribution deal with Asylum Records in 2004. The deal was a part of Warner Music Group's incubator program that built relationships with independent label executives the company aspired to hire. In addition, Mike Jones was also signed to Warner Bros. Records, while Paul Wall was also signed to Atlantic Records.

Mike Jones released his major-label debut, Who Is Mike Jones?, through Asylum, Warner Bros., and Swishahouse in April 2005. The album debuted and peaked in the top 3 on the Billboard 200, and was certified platinum by the RIAA, for selling over a million copies in the United States of America.

OG Ron C released F-Action 40 through the label in May 2005.

Swishahouse released Paul Wall's commercial debut studio album, The Peoples Champ‚ in September 2005. The album debuted and peaked at number one on the Billboard 200, and was ultimately certified Platinum in America. Before embarking on his rap career and while still at school, Wall had worked in the Swishahouse office.

In 2006, Houston based music label Dope House Records and Swishahouse teamed up to release South Park Mexican's ninth album, When Devils Strike. A chopped and screwed version was also released.

Swishahouse has archives hosted by Rice University's Center for Engaged Research and Collaborative Learning, a center under the Kinder Institute for Urban Research. The physical materials are hosted in the Woodson Research Center at the university's Fondren Library.

Swishahouse sponsored professional wrestler Bryan Keith.

On January 30, 2026, Michael Watts died from a torsades de pointes and was buried in Humble, Texas, on February 16th.

== Artists ==
- Paul Wall
- Mike Jones
- Archie Lee
- Coota Bang

== See also ==
- The Day Hell Broke Loose 3, Swishahouse compilation album
