= Chopped and screwed =

Music genre and technique of remixing music

- Other names: Screwed and chopped; slowed and throwed
- Stylistic origins: Southern hip hop
- Cultural origins: Early 1990s, Houston, Texas, United States
- Derivative forms: Witch house; seapunk; vaporwave; cloud rap; sigilkore; phonk

Subgenres
- Future screw; Slowed + reverb

Regional scenes
- Houston, Texas

Other topics
- Codeine: Dirty rap; bounce; Memphis rap; Chopped and screwed; crunk; trap

Chopped and screwed (also called screwed and chopped or slowed and throwed) is a genre of hip-hop music and technique of remixing and sampling music that involves slowing down the tempo and DJing. It was pioneered by DJ Screw, and became a staple in the Houston hip-hop scene in the 1990s. The screwed technique involves slowing the tempo of a song down to 60 and 70 quarter-note beats per minute and applying techniques such as skipping beats, record scratching, stop-time and affecting portions of the original composition to create a "chopped-up" variant of the material.

== Characteristics ==
In dance or hip-hop music sampling, the term "chopping" is the "altering [of] a sampled phrase [or break] by dividing it into smaller segments and reconfiguring them in a different order."

== History ==
=== Origins ===
The chopped and screwed style is named in reference to its creator, DJ Screw, who first developed the style in approximately 1990. (Note: While sources place the style's invention to this approximate period, there is no consensus on its precise timing. Screw's former manager, Charles Washington, dates it to the late 1980s; journalist Ben Westhoff dates it to 1990; journalist Jonathan Abrams places it "within the early 1990s"; and author Roni Sarig estimates the timing as "probably ... no later than 1991".) Some sources have argued that Screw created the style accidentally; others say that he took inspiration earlier slowed-down music by mixtape DJ Darryl Scott. Either way, it is agreed upon that Screw first created his style by slowing records dramatically via his turntable's pitch-control tools. Screw then expanded further upon this innovation by "chopping" the records' vocals, a process that involved isolating and looping specific passages, or by cutting out the vocal tracks entirely to allow himself or his collaborators to rap over the instrumental.

"DJ Screw made his name as a psychedelic remixer: he loved to slow records down, or "screw" them, and chop them up, manipulating them to repeat his favorite words or phrases. The effect, and perhaps the cause, was intoxicating."

— Kelefa Sanneh, The New York Times

The slow, psychedelic nature of screwed music formed an immediately apparent contrast against other, faster-paced genres of Southern hip-hop, such as the Miami bass scene. It has also attracted comparisons to the lethargic feeling induced by codeine intoxication. DJ Screw heavily used lean, a codeine-based drug cocktail, and screwed music commonly promoted lean in its lyrics. Although Screw himself disputed the idea that the appeal of screwed music was inherently linked to lean, (Note: On one occasion, he told The Source that it was designed to appeal to listeners high on cannabis instead; in another interview, he argued that its appeal was not dependent on the influence of drugs at all.) commentators have widely identified the two as closely affiliated.

In the mid-1990s, chopped and screwed music started to move to the north side of Houston by way of DJ Michael "5000" Watts, and later OG Ron C. A rivalry between north and south Houston over the true originators of chopped and screwed began to arise. Michael "5000" Watts always gave credit to DJ Screw as the originator of chopped and screwed music, although Watts has been a proponent of the slogan "screwed and chopped" instead of "chopped and screwed". In the late 1990s, with the help of P2P networks such as Napster, chopped and screwed music spread to a much wider audience.

On November 16, 2000, DJ Screw was found dead in the bathroom of his music studio. The autopsy report later revealed that Screw died from a combination of codeine, Valium, and PCP.

=== 2000s–2010s ===
Following the death of DJ Screw, his influence spread all over the southern US hip hop scene.

The 2007 documentary film Screwed in Houston details the history of the Houston rap scene and the influence of the chopped and screwed subculture on Houston hip hop. In 2011, University of Houston Libraries acquired over 1,000 albums owned by DJ Screw. Some of the albums were part of an exhibit in early 2012 and, along with the rest, went available for research in 2013.

To date, the chopped and screwed music genre has been added to many streaming services, including iTunes and Spotify.

The Chopstars DJ collective, created by Swishahouse Records co-founder OG Ron C, began calling their remixes ChopNotSlop due to all the “sloppy” remixes that came out after the passing of DJ Screw. Since 2001, they have dedicated their cause to the legacy of DJ Screw. The Chopstars have become the prominent source for chopped up music. With official releases with Brent Faiyaz, Don Toliver and Little Dragon (Nabuma Purple Rubberband) they have made a niche in the sub genre. They currently have a radio show called ChopNotSlopShow on Sound 42 which is Drake’s radio station on SiriusXM. Notable members include DJ Ryan Wolf, official DJ of the Cleveland Browns; DJ Candlestick; DJ Lil Steve; DJ Hollygrove; Mike G, formerly of Odd Future; and Oscar Award winning director Barry Jenkins as a creative collaborator.

== Related genres ==
=== Future screw and lean house ===
In the mid-2010s, producers on SoundCloud began experimenting with fusing chopped and screwed music and EDM. It has since developed into subgenres such as "future screw" and "lean house". DJ Slim K got a rising name and DJ Drobitussin, also known as BMF in the EDM world, or Brett Finn who is an award winner for his beats and DJ & Production skills

=== Slowed and reverb ===
Slowed and reverb
- Other names: Slowed + reverb; daycore
- Stylistic origins: Chopped and screwed; vaporwave
- Cultural origins: Late 2010s, online

Slowed and reverb (stylized as "slowed + reverb") is a technique of remixing and a subgenre, derived from chopped and screwed hip-hop and vaporwave, which involves slowing down and adding reverb to a previously existing song, often created by using digital audio editors such as Audacity. The technique originated in 2006 when the Lebanese one-man Black Metal band Kafan re-released its only demo Injecting Evil In Thy Veins on cult American label Full Moon Productions in CD format. The release presents one of the earliest known examples of intentionally slowed down and reverb drenched music outside of hip-hop, predating modern slowed + reverb trends. This method, while commonplace in modern internet music culture, was never seen in extreme metal at the time. The effect creates an unsettling, almost ritualistic soundscape, deepening the record's oppressive and hypnotic qualities. The eerie, ghostly effect of slowed + reverb tracks that define modern vaporwave and remix culture can be heard here, years before it became a recognized trend. Despite its historical significance, the slowed-down Kafan remixes remain largely unknown outside of niche black metal and experimental music circles. Unlike what happened in 2017, when Houston-based producer Jarylun Moore (known online as slater!), having been inspired by DJ Screw, began uploading remixes of popular songs using the technique to YouTube. The first of these—a remix of Lil Uzi Vert's song "20 Min"—earned over one million views on the platform in under two months, eventually earning over four million views before being taken down. The style became especially popular on YouTube, where it became common to play remixes over looping clips from retrofuturistic anime scenes. Other notable producers in this sub-genre include wretchshop (also known as ciki 8k), rum world, Aestheticg, imlonely, Chovies, slerb as well as streliz.

Slowed and reverb remixes were also uploaded to Spotify using the service's podcast feature. For Okayplayer, Elijah C. Watson dubbed slowed and reverb remixes "the soundtrack for Generation Z", comparing the style to lo-fi hip hop. Remixes using the technique also became popular on the video-sharing service TikTok.

Slowed and reverb remixes became controversial on social media in mid-2020 after a viral video posted to TikTok failed to attribute the creation of slowed and reverb to chopped and screwed, causing users to brand slowed and reverb a "gentrified" version of chopped and screwed. For the Houston Chronicle, Shelby Stewart wrote, "Give DJ Screw his flowers. Slowed + reverb is a poor imitation of what chopped and screwed music is." Moore had mixed feelings about the phenomenon, saying, "I always felt that I shouldn't touch chopped and screwed music. One, it's not really screwed if it's not by Screw. Two, the chops are sacred to the culture, and not everybody can imitate it. So I would never want to even try to. I'm just glad I'm able to bring it to a wider audience."

Other responses to the subgenre's popularity were more positive. Despite the backlash from DJ Screw fans, other creators such as Isaac Sigala uploaded slowed and reverb remixes to honor the chopped and screwed genre through nostalgia. Sigala said of the popularity of his remixes, "I knew it was gonna happen. I see the kind of emotions that were brought out in me when I first started getting into [slowed music]. I could see how others would express their emotions too."

The YouTube comments sections of slowed and reverb videos are often used as a safe haven for users, which Digital Trends described as "a sensitive reprieve from the toxicity often found on the platform." Users commonly share stories of heartbreak and loss, which are given support by the slowed and reverb content creators. YouTuber Rayen Hemden said that he feels protective of his commenters and will act as a moderator to keep discussion compassionate. He further stated, "I make sure there are no hate comments towards the people who share their stories because it takes bravery. Someone has to be courageous to actually share their story."

=== Doomer wave ===
Doomer wave (also known as doomerwave, doomer music or simply doomer) is an online music microgenre coined by anonymous users on 4chan in 2018 to describe an offshoot of the Wojak meme known as "doomer wojak". The style was originally associated with slowed down versions of depressive tracks as inspired by the vaporwave microgenre. Pitchfork described the "doomer" as "a nihilistic, 20-something male whose despair about the world causes him to retreat from traditional society". The term later expanded to encompass the "doomer girl" archetype. In 2020, Belarusian post-punk band Molchat Doma garnered internet virality through online memes and playlists which referred to them as "Russian doomer music" or "doomer wave".

== See also ==
- Sampling (music)
- Mashup (music)

== Bibliography ==
- Abrams, Jonathan (2022). The Come Up: An Oral History of the Rise of Hip-Hop. Crown. ISBN 9781984825155.
- Lynch, Jamie (2010). "The Long, Hot Grind: How Houston Engineered an Industry of Independence". In Hess, Mickey (ed.). Hip Hop in America: A Regional Guide. Vol. 2. ABC-CLIO. ISBN 9780313343223.
- Sarig, Roni (2007). Third Coast: Outkast, Timbaland, and How Hip-hop Became a Southern Thing. Da Capo Press. ISBN 9780306814303.
- Westhoff, Ben (2011). Dirty South: Outkast, Lil Wayne, Soulja Boy, and the Southern Rappers who Reinvented Hip-Hop. Chicago Review Press. ISBN 9781569766064.
