= The Sound of Revenge =

2005 album by Chamillionaire

Studio album by Chamillionaire
- Released: November 22, 2005
- Recorded: 2004–05
- Genres: Gangsta rap; southern hip hop
- Length: 71:15
- Labels: Chamillitary; Universal
- Producers: Chamillionaire (also exec.); The Beat Bullies; Scott Storch; Hardley Davidson; Play-N-Skillz; Cool & Dre; Happy Perez; Mannie Fresh; Sol Messiah; Twinz; AJ Skratch; Sean Blaze; CHOPS; Da Riffs

Chamillionaire chronology
The Sound of Revenge (2005)	Ultimate Victory (2007)

Singles from The Sound of Revenge
- 1. "Turn It Up" Released: September 3, 2005; 2. "Ridin'" Released: November 12, 2005; 3. "Grown and Sexy" Released: June 11, 2006

Professional ratings
Review scores
Source	Rating
AllMusic	3.5/5 stars
Blender	3/5 stars
HipHopDX	3/5 stars
IGN	7.7/10
RapReviews	8.5/10
Rolling Stone	3.5/5 stars
USA Today	3/4 stars

The Sound of Revenge is the debut studio album by American rapper Chamillionaire. It was released on November 22, 2005, by Chamillitary Entertainment and Universal Records. The album features guest appearances from Lil' Flip, Lil Wayne, Rasaq (his younger brother), Natalie Alvarado, Krayzie Bone, Bun B, Scarface, Billy Cook, Killer Mike, and Pastor Troy, with its production on the album was handled by Scott Storch, Mannie Fresh, Play-N-Skillz, Cool, and Dre, among others.

The album also has the release of "Chopped and screwed version" by DJ OG Ron C. Chamillionaire and Krayzie Bone won the Best Rap Performance By A Duo or Group Grammy for the song "Ridin'". In 2009, Chamillionaire released Mixtape Messiah 7 and explained on the final track of disc 1 that he was also going to be considered for the Best New Artist Grammy but, bootleggers caused him to be disqualified by releasing unauthorized Chamillionaire albums the same year his debut was released.

The album debuted at number 10 on the US Billboard 200, selling 130,000 copies in its first week, and it later became certified platinum by Recording Industry Association of America (RIAA), selling more than 1.5 million copies in the United States as of December 19, 2006. The non-album single, "Picture Perfect", peaked at number 28 on Hot Ringtones.

== Track listing ==
Standard edition
No.	Title	Writer(s)	Producer(s)	Length
1.	"The Sound of Revenge (Intro)"	Hakeem Seriki; Nsilo Reddick; Nick Sherwood	The Beat Bullies	3:18
2.	"In the Trunk"	H. Seriki; Aeneas Middleton	Hardley Davidson; Chamillionaire (add.)	4:38
3.	"Turn It Up" (featuring Lil' Flip)	H. Seriki; Scott Storch; Wesley Weston	Scott Storch	4:34
4.	"Ridin'" (featuring Krayzie Bone)	H. Seriki; Juan Salinas; Oscar Salinas; Anthony Henderson	Play-N-Skillz	5:03
5.	"No Snitchin'" (featuring Bun B)	H. Seriki; Andre Lyon; Marcello Valenzano; Bernard Freeman	Cool & Dre	4:32
6.	"Southern Takeover" (featuring Killer Mike and Pastor Troy)	H. Seriki; Reddick; Sherwood; Michael Render; Micah Troy	The Beat Bullies	5:17
7.	"Radio Interruption"	H. Seriki; Reddick; Sherwood	The Beat Bullies	3:28
8.	"Frontin'"	H. Seriki; Nathan Perez	Happy Perez	4:10
9.	"Grown and Sexy"	H. Seriki; Reddick; Sherwood	The Beat Bullies	4:03
10.	"Think I'm Crazy" (featuring Natalie)	H. Seriki; Reddick; Sherwood; Sam Bettens; Gert Bettens	The Beat Bullies	5:04
11.	"Rain" (featuring Scarface and Billy Cook)	H. Seriki; Ernest Franklin; Brad Jordan	Sol Messiah	5:11
12.	"Picture Perfect" (featuring Bun B)	H. Seriki; Franklin; Freeman; Ronald Isley; Ernie Isley; Marvin Isley; Rudolph Isley; O'Kelly Isley; Chris Jasper	Sol Messiah	4:47
13.	"Fly as the Sky" (featuring Lil Wayne and Rasaq)	H. Seriki; Byron Thomas; Dwayne Carter; Rasaq Seriki	Mannie Fresh	4:59
14.	"Peepin' Me" (featuring Tami Latrell)	H. Seriki; Reddick; Sherwood	The Beat Bullies	4:21
15.	"Void in My Life"	H. Seriki; Timothy Janicki; Larry DiTommaso; Ralph Palladino	Twinz	4:41
16.	"Outro"	H. Seriki; Sean Henderson; Avery Jones	AJ Skratch; Sean Blaze	3:09
Total length:				71:15

Deluxe edition bonus disc
No.	Title	Producer(s)	Length
1.	"Turn It Up (Remix)" (featuring Lil' O, H.A.W.K, and E.S.G.)	CHOPS	5:09
2.	"Grind Time"	Da Riffs	3:24
3.	"Rider"	Happy Perez	4:01
4.	"Hate in Ya Eyes"	Cool & Dre	3:41
5.	"Bad Guy"	Twinz	3:56
Total length:			1:31:29

== Samples credits ==
Think I'm Crazy

- "Everything for Free" by K's Choice

Picture Perfect

- "Ain't I Been Good to You (Part 1 & 2)" by The Isley Brothers

Void in My Life

- "Do What You Do" by Jermaine Jackson

== Personnel ==
=== Musicians ===
- The Beat Bullies – keyboards (6, 7, 9), programming (1, 6, 7, 9, 10, 14)
- Sean Blaze – drums, keyboard, and programming (16)
- Terrence Brown – keyboards (6, 7, 9), Rhodes Hammond organ (10, 14)
- Bun B – background vocals (5)
- Cool & Dre – all instruments (5)
- Preston Crump – bass (11)
- Harley Davidson – all instruments (2)
- Marvin "Chippeo" Jackson – background vocals (1, 7)
- Avery Jones – drums, keyboard, programming, bass, and guitar (16)
- Debra Killings – bass (9)
- Steve Lake – guitar (11, 12), bass (12)
- Tami Latrell – background vocals (14)
- Fitzgerald Lingard – bass (10, 14)
- "Thunda" Dan Marshall – guitar (1, 7, 9, 10, 14)
- Sol Messiah – drums, keyboards, and programming (11, 12)
- Natalie – background vocals (10)
- Happy Perez – additional keyboards (2)
- Deone Rhodes – background vocals (1)
- Rock D The Legend – flute (14)
- Jen Rose – opera vocals (1)
- Rhemario "Rio Beats" Webber – Hammond organ (12)

=== Technical personnel and design ===
- Wayne Allison – engineer (3)
- The Beat Bullies – engineer (1, 6, 7, 9, 10, 14)
- Sean Blaze – engineer and mixing (16)
- Robert "Big Brizz" Brisbane – engineer (5)
- Chris Carmouch – engineer (6)
- Tony Cavasin – assistant engineer (1, 6, 7, 9, 10, 14)
- Rick DeVarona – assistant engineer (1, 7, 10, 14)
- Kathryn Diehl – mixing assistant (2, 5, 8)
- Blake Douglas – engineer (10), mixing assistant (9, 10, 14)
- Taylor Dow – assistant engineer (2, 15)
- Gary Fly – assistant engineer (6)
- Mike Frost – art direction
- Chris Gehringer – mastering
- Conrad Golding – engineer (3)
- Jason Goldstein – mixing (3)
- Mark "Exit" Goodchild – engineer (13)
- Michael Guidatti – assistant engineer (1, 7, 10, 14)
- James Hoover – engineer (1, 3, 4, 8, 11, 13, 14, 16), mixing (1, 4, 6, 15, 16)
- Eric Jensen – mixing assistant (13)
- Jonathan Mannion – photography
- "Thunda" Dan Marshall – engineer (1, 6, 7, 9, 10, 14)
- Rodney Maspoch – engineer (13)
- Play-N-Skillz – mixing (4)
- Gregg Rominiecki – engineer (2, 15)
- Brian Stanley – engineer (12), mixing (2, 5, 7–14)
- Matt Still – engineer (1, 14)
- Bram Tobey – mixing assistant (13)

== Charts ==
=== Weekly charts ===
Chart (2005–2006)	Peak position
Australian Hitseekers Albums (ARIA)	17
Canadian Albums (Nielsen SoundScan)	18
French Albums (SNEP)	68
German Albums (Offizielle Top 100)	100
Irish Albums (IRMA)	34
New Zealand Albums (RMNZ)	11
Scottish Albums (Official Charts)	28
UK Albums (Official Charts)	22
UK R&B Albums (Official Charts)	2
US Billboard 200	10
US Top R&B/Hip-Hop Albums (Billboard)	2
US Top Rap Albums (Billboard)	2

=== Year-end charts ===
Chart (2006)	Position
US Billboard 200	34
US Top R&B/Hip-Hop Albums (Billboard)	12

== Certifications ==
Region	Certification	Certified units/sales
United Kingdom (BPI)	Gold	100,000^{^}
United States (RIAA)	Platinum	1,000,000^{^}
^{^} Shipments figures based on certification alone.
