= Ridin' =

Single by Chamillionaire featuring Krayzie Bone

from the album The Sound of Revenge
- Released: November 12, 2005
- Recorded: 2005
- Genre: Hip hop
- Length: 5:02 (album version); 4:08 (radio edit)
- Label: Universal; Chamillitary
- Songwriters: Hakeem Seriki; Juan Salinas & Oscar Salinas; Anthony Henderson
- Producer: Play-N-Skillz

Chamillionaire singles chronology
"Turn It Up" (2005)	"Ridin'" (2005)	"Get Up" (2006)

Krayzie Bone singles chronology
"Get'chu Twisted" (2005)	"Ridin'" (2005)	"Spit Your Game" (2007)

Music video
- "Ridin'" on YouTube

"Ridin" is a song by American rapper Chamillionaire featuring fellow American rapper Krayzie Bone of Bone Thugs-n-Harmony, released on November 12, 2005, as the second single from his debut studio album The Sound of Revenge (2005). Produced by hip hop producers Play-N-Skillz, the song's lyrics discuss racial profiling and police brutality, in addition to the stereotyping of African Americans driving a vehicle with drugs and other contraband on the inside (riding dirty).

== Music video ==
The music video shows a police officer (played by Tommy Lister Jr.), abusing his power. He juxtaposes police actions with wrestling scenes to show how the police treats suspects. The music video, filmed in Dallas, features appearances Bone Thugs-n-Harmony members Wish Bone and Layzie Bone, Play-N-Skillz, Chingo Bling, OG Ron C, Big Tuck, and Chamillionaire's younger brother Rasaq.

== Reception ==
At the 49th Annual Grammy Awards, "Ridin'" won Best Rap Performance by a Duo or Group and received a nomination for Best Rap Song. It was awarded the last Best Rap Video at the MTV Video Music Awards in 2006. The song ranked number three on Rolling Stone's 100 Best Songs of 2006 and number 6 on BET's Top 100 Music Videos Of 2006. It was the best-selling ringtone in 2006, with 3.2 million sales, certified by the RIAA as the first multi-platinum Mastertone artist in history.

== Chart performance ==
"Ridin'" debuted on the Billboard Hot 100 at number 88 the week of February 25, 2006. It moved from number 12 to number 4 the week of April 29, 2006, and stayed there for two weeks. This gave Chamillionaire his first Hot 100 number-one hit in his career. It was Krayzie Bone's first Hot 100 number-one hit as a solo act and his first overall in a decade since spending eight consecutive weeks at the top with "Tha Crossroads" as part of Bone Thugs-n-Harmony. "Ridin'" stayed on the Billboard Hot 100 for 31 weeks. Throughout 2006, it sold 1,417,178 digital copies in the United States. In New Zealand, the song debuted at number 3, then moved to number 2, where it peaked and stayed for seven consecutive weeks. The song peaked at number 2 in the United Kingdom, behind Shakira's "Hips Don't Lie".

== Track listing ==
UK 12-inch

1. "Ridin'" (album version)
2. "Ridin'" (UK remix) (featuring Sway)
3. "Ridin'" (instrumental)

== Charts ==
=== Weekly charts ===
Chart (2006)	Peak position
Australia (ARIA)	24
Australian Urban (ARIA) Remix feat. Tyree	6
Austria (Ö3 Austria Top 40)	13
Canada Digital Song Sales (Billboard)	7
Canada CHR/Pop Top 40 (Radio & Records)	6
Canada CHR/Top 40 (Billboard)	6
Europe (Eurochart Hot 100)	7
France (SNEP)	40
Germany (GfK)	8
Ireland (IRMA)	2
Latvia (Latvian Airplay Top 50)	12
Netherlands (Dutch Top 40 Tipparade)	7
Netherlands (Single Top 100)	73
New Zealand (Recorded Music NZ)	2
Scottish Singles Sales (Official Charts)	5
Sweden (Sverigetopplistan)	25
Switzerland (Schweizer Hitparade)	19
UK Singles (Official Charts)	2
UK Hip Hop/R&B (Official Charts)	1
US Billboard Hot 100	1
US Hot R&B/Hip-Hop Songs (Billboard)	7
US Hot Rap Songs (Billboard)	2
US Pop Airplay (Billboard)	3
US Pop 100 (Billboard)	3
US Rhythmic Airplay (Billboard)	1

Chart (2007)	Peak position
Romania (Romanian Top 100)	69

=== Year-end charts ===
Chart (2006)	Position
Europe (Eurochart Hot 100)	54
Germany (Media Control GfK)	67
New Zealand (RIANZ)	10
UK Singles (OCC)	41
UK Urban (Music Week)	30
US Billboard Hot 100	8
US Hot R&B/Hip-Hop Songs (Billboard)	47
US Rhythmic Airplay (Billboard)	3

== Certifications ==
Region	Certification	Certified units/sales
Brazil (Pro-Música Brasil)	Platinum	60,000^{‡}
Canada (Music Canada) Ringtone	6× Platinum	240,000^{*}
Denmark (IFPI Danmark)	Gold	4,000^{^}
Germany (BVMI)	Platinum	300,000^{‡}
New Zealand (RMNZ)	Platinum	30,000^{‡}
Sweden (GLF)	Gold	10,000^{^}
United Kingdom (BPI)	Gold	400,000^{‡}
United States (RIAA)	Gold	500,000^{*}
United States (RIAA) Mastertone	4× Platinum	4,000,000^{*}
^{*} Sales figures based on certification alone.^{^} Shipments figures based on certification alone.^{‡} Sales+streaming figures based on certification alone.

== Release history ==
Release dates and formats for "Ridin'"
Region	Date	Format	Label(s)	Ref.
United States	February 21, 2006	Rhythmic airplay	Universal	
United States	April 24, 2006	Mainstream airplay	Universal	

== See also ==
- Driving while black
- "White & Nerdy", a parody of the song by "Weird Al" Yankovic.
- List of Billboard Hot 100 number-one singles of the 2000s
- List of Billboard Rhythmic number-one songs of the 2000s
