= OG Ron C =

American rapper (born 1973)

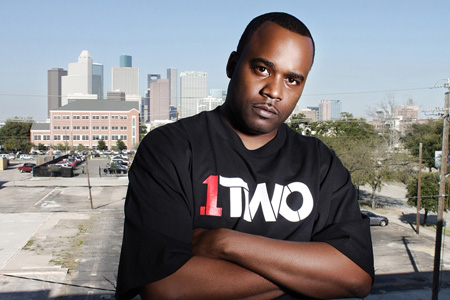

Background information
- Born: Ronald Rummell Coleman; August 19, 1973 (age 53); Houston, Texas, U.S.
- Genre: Hip-hop
- Occupations: DJ, record producer, executive
- Instrument: Turntables
- Years active: 1987–present
- Labels: Swishahouse/EMI (1997–2002); Universal/EMI (2002–2006); Chamillitary/EMI (2004–2006); ChopNotSlop Entertainment (2009–present); OVO Sound
- Website: Official Website

Ronald Rummell Coleman (born August 19, 1973), better known by his stage name OG Ron C, is an American DJ, radio personality, Grammy nominated record producer, and entertainment and management company executive, who is currently signed to OVO Sound and is also an on-air DJ for KQBT 93.7 The Beat. He is the owner of the Houston-based urban music online radio station ChopNotSlop Radio, former DJ of Southern rappers Chamillionaire and Slim Thug. Along with Michael 5000 Watts, he co-founded Swishahouse Records and helped jump-start the careers of Slim Thug, Chamillionaire, Paul Wall and Mike Jones. The leader and founder of The Chopstars, he was the first Houston DJ to receive his own day (September 4) when he got a proclamation from Mayor Sylvester Turner. He is most known for his F-Action (Fuck Action) Series Mixtape which features R&B songs Chopped and Screwed and to date has over 4,200 mixtapes and albums, both at regular speed and chopped and screwed speed. He has sold over 22,000,000 mixtapes and albums to date. He also is the founder of Chopnotslop Radio, a 24-hour "Screwed" Radio station dedicated to DJ Screw.

== Biography ==
Ronald Rummell Coleman, aka DJ OG Ron C, began his DJ career at parties in his northside neighborhood of 5th Ward in Houston, Texas, while a freshman in high school. In the 12th grade he got a job on the first street team for Houston radio station Majic 102. During his senior year Ron C earned a grant to attend Wiley College in Marshall, Texas, to study communication. He attended Wiley for a year and worked at the school-run radio station KBWC. After being there a year C took a lead at Houston urban station 97.9 The Box in promotions as an intern. In 1994 Ron C was given a paid position at KBXX 97.9 FM. That same year he met Michael "5000" Watts who was also a DJ at the station. On the south side of town a new subgenre of rap that had been created by DJ Screw was so popular that the sound was being played on the north side. Ron C teamed with Watts (who released "party tapes" which are called mixtapes today) to release a screwed and chopped tape of their own. In 1995, Swishahouse was founded as a joint venture between the two DJs. DJ Screw let south-side MCs rap on his tapes and the Swishahouse would soon do the same for rappers on the north side.

== Swishahouse Records ==
In 1997, Ron C and Watts began hosting parties for high school students at The All Star Sports Center on Houston's northside near Acres Homes. Freestyle contests would be held to harvest the city for its talent. Chamillionaire, Slim Thug and Paul Wall attended these contests regularly. After impressing Ron C and Watts, they were invited to join The Swishahouse. In 1999, Ron C left radio to release the independent Swishahouse album entitled "The Day Hell Broke Loose" with his co-CEO Mike Watts. The album would go on to sell 100,000 copies and become a Houston classic. This same year people began calling him OG Ron C, and he said on a mixtape "for now on don't call me Ron C, call me OG RON C". The next year Ron signed a deal with head KBXX 97.9 DJ Madd Hatta's label Paid-n-Full Records to drop "Southern's Finest" which sold 40,000 copies and featured the hit single "In Love with my money" by Chamillionaire and Paul Wall. In the early part of the century, Ron C and Watts decided to part ways as business partners, and OG Ron C left the label he helped create, Swishahouse.

== Chamillitary Ent ==
After leaving Swishahouse, OG Ron C continued to make his critically acclaimed F-ck Action Series, composed of screwed & chopped R&B songs. He was also nominated for 4 Justo Awards (the Grammy of DJ awards), and went on to win 2 Justo's for "Best Dirty South Mixtape DJ" in 2004 & 2005. Also In 2004 OG Ron C became the official DJ for platinum selling Universal artist Chamillionaire, he doubled as his show DJ and showed off his skills as Chamillionaires exclusive mixtape DJ. for Chamillitary mixtapes. In 2005, he received his first Southern Entertainment award for the best screwed and chopped CD. He also released two independent albums entitled "Real Recognize Real" with his Brother Wood, which sold over 20,000, and "Diamonds and Tattoos" with local artist Tow Down, which sold over 20,000.

== 2006 to 2008 ==
In 2006, OG Ron C had made appearances on 106 and Park, Rap City as well as other DJ's mixtapes. He had chopped up over 100 major and independent albums, as well as over 200 mixtapes for artists such as Three 6 Mafia, Master P, Chingy, 8Ball & MJG, Prophet Posse, Devin the Dude, Z-Ro, the Ghetto Boys, Lil' Flip, Pitbull, and Chamillionaire's Sound Of Revenge Chopped and Screwed, Universal, which has sold more than any other screwed and chopped CD on a major label. OG Ron C has also appeared in XXL, The Source, Ozone, Murda Dog, and Down Magazine, as well as in an assortment of other publications.

== 2008 to Present ==
OG Ron C started a website called CHOPNOTSLOP.COM, which he dedicated to keeping DJ Screw's music alive. On the website, he also has the world's first 24 Hour Screwed (music) Up Radio Station Chopnotslop Radio. Being that he is such a major influence to other DJs he started The Chopstars to help up and coming Chopped and Screwed DJs. He started with DJ Lil Steve who has been his protégé since 2005. In 2008, he met and brought on DJ Candlestick. In 2009, he added DJ Hollygrove and DJ Chose a well-known College and Texas Club Scene DJ/producer/artist. Dj Chose is a member of the group Brook Gang Music that OG Ron C also manages. In 2009 he hooked back up with his old Swishahouse right-hand-man Michael '5000' Watts and released the highly downloaded "The Return Of The Realest". Via Chopnotslop.com he continues to release new mixtapes and albums. He always preached that he wanted to continue to keep DJ Screw's legacy alive by offering his own brand of audio intoxication, and "keepin' boys Chopped Up, Not Slopped Up."

In 2013 OG Ron C made a remix of Swedish hiphop duo Lorentz & Sakarias "Molnen (Ni kan inte nå mig)" ft. Duvchi.

In a first for OG Ron C, he collaborated with California-based indie rock band The Neighbourhood for the Chopped Not Slopped remix of the group's single "Afraid".

== ChopNotSlop Radio And App ==
Is an online radio station that specializes in ChopNotSlop music. It is the first 24 hours chopped and screwed radio station. It was created in 2008 with the intentions of helping keep the subgenre that DJ Screw had created. The station broadcasts in MP3 format that can be played via ChopNotSlop app available on iTunes App Store, Google Play

== Gizzle MGMT ==
OG Ron C started a management company in 2009 and currently has 3 celebrities signed under Gizzle Mgmt:

- DJ Chose
- MTV Riff Raff
- Jeremy Mincey

== Discography ==
- 1995–Present: F-Action 1-67
- 1998: The Life of Joseph W. McVey
- 2004: The Mixtape Messiah
- 2006: The Sound of Revenge (Screwed & Chopped)
- 2007: Underground Kingz
- 2009: Pretty Ricky
- 2011: Chop the Throne: Kanye West & Jay-Z OG Ron C Edition
- 2011: Chop Care: Drake OG Ron C Edition
- 2011: La Familia Brook Gang Music
- 2012: Right Place Right Time DJ Chose
- 2012: Channel Purple
- 2012: God Forgives, I Chop
- 2013: 2 Chainz Based on a T.R.U. Story ChopNotSlop
- 2015: Little Dragon Nabuma Purple Rubberband
- 2017: Moonlight Soundtrack
- 2019: Mike Devoe Capricorn Reborn ChopNotSlop
- 2021: TSU (song) (producer) - Certified Lover Boy- Drake
- 2022: Wrath, Greed, Kick Rocks, Want (ChopNotSlop Remix) (producer) - Freddie's Inferno - The Slow Descent- Freddie Dredd
- 2022: Freddie's Inferno - The Slow Descent (with Freddie Dredd)
- 2022: Freddie's Inferno: Ghost Slowed (producer)- Freddie Dredd
- 2026: Riff Raff: FUCHSiA FALCON

== See also ==
- List of record labels
- Houston hip-hop
