= Geto Boys discography =

- Studio albums: 7
- Compilation albums: 3
- Singles: 4
- Remix albums: 1

The discography of the Geto Boys contains seven studio albums, one remix album, three compilations and four charting singles. Geto Boys (originally spelled Ghetto Boys) is a hip-hop group located in Houston, Texas that started off with the members Raheem, Prince Johnny C and Sire Jukebox but ended up releasing their debut album in 1988, Making Trouble, with Prince Johnny C, Sire Jukebox, DJ Ready Red and Bushwick Bill as members. After failing commercially and critically, the group's line-up was changed around by removing Johnny C and Sire Jukebox but replacing them with Willie D and Scarface. This line-up released Grip It! On That Other Level and since then, has become the most familiar Geto Boys line-up. Rapper Big Mike was also a member of the group at one point, for the album Till Death Do Us Part.

== Albums ==
=== Studio albums ===
List of studio albums, with selected chart positions and certifications
| Title | Album details | Peak chart positions | | Certifications |
| Title | Album details | US | US R&B | Certifications |
|---|---|---|---|---|
| Making Trouble | Released: February 17, 1988; Label: Rap-A-Lot; Format: CD, LP, cassette, digital download | – | – | |
| Grip It! On That Other Level | Released: March 12, 1989; Label: Rap-A-Lot; Format: CD, cassette, digital download | 166 | 19 | |
| We Can't Be Stopped | Released: July 9, 1991; Label: Rap-A-Lot; Format: CD, LP, cassette, digital download | 24 | 5 | RIAA: Platinum |
| Till Death Do Us Part | Released: March 19, 1993; Label: Rap-A-Lot; Format: CD, LP, cassette, digital download | 11 | 1 | RIAA: Gold |
| The Resurrection | Released: April 2, 1996; Label: Rap-A-Lot; Format: CD, LP, cassette, digital download | 6 | 1 | RIAA: Gold |
| Da Good da Bad & da Ugly | Released: November 17, 1998; Label: Rap-A-Lot; Format: CD, LP, cassette, digital download | 26 | 5 | |
| The Foundation | Released: January 25, 2005; Label: Rap-A-Lot; Format: CD, LP, digital download | 19 | 3 | |

=== Compilation albums ===
List of compilation albums, with selected chart positions
| Title | Album details | Peak chart positions | |
| Title | Album details | US | US R&B |
|---|---|---|---|
| Uncut Dope: Geto Boys' Best | Released: November 5, 1992; Label: Rap-A-Lot; Format: CD | 147 | 31 |
| Greatest Hits | Released: November 19, 2002; Label: Rap-A-Lot; Format: CD | — | 69 |
| Best of the Geto Boys | Released: June 17, 2008; Label: Rap-A-Lot; Format: CD | — | 87 |

=== Remix albums ===
List of remix albums, with selected chart positions
| Title | Album details | Peak chart positions | |
| Title | Album details | US | US R&B |
|---|---|---|---|
| The Geto Boys | Released: September 21, 1990; Label: Def American; Format: CD, LP, cassette, digital download | 171 | 67 |

== Singles ==
List of singles, with selected chart positions and certifications, showing year released and album name
| Title | Year | Peak chart positions | | | | | | | | Certifications | Album |
| Title | Year | US | US Dance Sales | US R&B | US Rap | US Rhyth. | UK | UK Dance | UK R&B | Certifications | Album |
|---|---|---|---|---|---|---|---|---|---|---|---|
| "Car Freak" | 1987 | — | — | — | — | — | — | — | — | | Non-album single |
| "You Ain't Nothing" / "I Run This" | 1987 | — | — | — | — | — | — | — | — | | Making Trouble |
| "Be Down" / "My Musician" | 1988 | — | — | — | — | — | — | — | — | | Non-album single |
| "Do It Like a G.O." | 1990 | — | — | — | — | — | — | — | — | | The Geto Boys |
| "Mind Playing Tricks on Me" | 1991 | 23 | 32 | 10 | 1 | — | — | — | — | RIAA: Gold | We Can't Be Stopped |
| "Ain't with Being Broke" | 1991 | — | — | — | — | — | — | — | — | | We Can't Be Stopped |
| "Crooked Officer" | 1993 | — (Note: "Crooked Officer" did not enter the Billboard Hot 100, but peaked at number eleven on the Bubbling Under Hot 100 Singles chart.) | — | 70 | 4 | — | — | — | — | | Original Gangstas (soundtrack)/Till Death Do Us Part |
| "Six Feet Deep" | 1993 | 40 | — | 37 | 2 | 34 | — | — | — | | Original Gangstas (soundtrack)/Till Death Do Us Part |
| "Straight Gangstaism" | 1993 | — | — | — | — | — | — | — | — | | Original Gangstas (soundtrack)/Till Death Do Us Part |
| "The World Is a Ghetto" | 1996 | 82 | — | 37 | 12 | — | 49 | 21 | 11 | | The Resurrection |
| "Geto Fantasy" | 1996 | — | — | — | — | — | — | — | — | | The Resurrection |
| "Gangsta (Put Me Down)" | 1998 | — | — | — | — | — | — | — | — | | Da Good da Bad & da Ugly |
| "Yes, Yes, Y'all" | 2005 | — | — | — | — | — | — | — | — | | The Foundation |
| "G Code" | 2005 | — | — | — | — | — | — | — | — | | The Foundation |
"—" denotes a recording that did not chart or was not released in that territory.

=== Promotional singles ===
List of promotional singles, showing year released and album name
| Title | Year | Album |
|---|---|---|
| "Like Some" / "Free" | 1998 | Da Good da Bad & da Ugly |

== Music videos ==
List of music videos, with directors, showing year released
| Title | Year | Director(s) |
|---|---|---|
| "Do It Like a G.O." | 1990 | Unknown |
| "Mind Playing Tricks on Me" | 1991 | Richard Hunt |
| "Ain't with Being Broke" | 1991 | Guy Guillet |
| "Damn It Feels Good to Be a Gangsta" | 1992 | Unknown |
| "Six Feet Deep" | 1993 | Unknown |
| "Straight Gangstaism" | 1993 | Joseph Kahn |
| "Crooked Officer" | 1993 | Unknown |
| "The World Is a Ghetto" | 1996 | Guy Guillet |
| "Geto Fantasy" | 1996 | Unknown |
| "Gangsta (Put Me Down)" | 1998 | Chris Robinson |
| "Yes, Yes, Y'all" | 2005 | Unknown |
| "G Code" | 2005 | Unknown |
| "I Tried" | 2005 | Benny Matthews |
