= Best of the Geto Boys =

Greatest hits album by Geto Boys
- Released: June 17, 2008
- Recorded: 1988–2004
- Genre: Gangsta rap, Southern hip hop
- Label: Asylum/Rap-A-Lot

Geto Boys chronology
The Foundation (2005)	Best of the Geto Boys (2008)

Professional ratings
Review scores
Source	Rating
Allmusic	2.5/5 stars

Best of the Geto Boys is a compilation album by the rap group Geto Boys, released in 2008.

== Track listing ==
Tracks overlap for a few seconds.

#	Title	Original album
1	"Intro"	—
2	"Yes, Yes Y'all"	The Foundation
3	"Fuck 'Em"	The Geto Boys
4	"Let a Ho Be a Ho"	The Geto Boys
5	"Gotta Let 'Em Hang "	We Can't Be Stopped
6	"We Can't Be Stopped"	We Can't Be Stopped
7	"Gangster of Love"	The Geto Boys
8	"Damn It Feels Good to Be a Gangsta"	Uncut Dope
9	"Gangsta (Put Me Down)"	Da Good da Bad & da Ugly
10	"Mind Playing Tricks on Me"	We Can't Be Stopped
11	"Chuckie"	We Can't Be Stopped
12	"Size Ain't Shit"	The Geto Boys
13	"Talkin' Loud Ain't Sayin' Nothin'"	The Geto Boys
14	"Snitches"	Making Trouble
15	"Crooked Officer"	Till Death Do Us Part
16	"When It Gets Gangsta"	The Foundation
17	"Still"	The Resurrection
18	"It Ain't Shit"	Till Death Do Us Part
19	"Do It Like a G.O."	The Geto Boys
20	"G Code"	The Foundation
21	"Trigga Happy Nigga"	Grip It! On That Other Level
22	"Scarface"	The Geto Boys
23	"Assassins"	Making Trouble
24	"Fuck a War"	We Can't Be Stopped
25	"Geto Boys and Girls"	The Resurrection
