= Greatest Hits (Geto Boys album) =

Greatest hits album by Geto Boys
- Released: November 29, 2002
- Recorded: 1988–2002
- Genre: Hip-hop
- Length: 1:18:29
- Label: Rap-A-Lot

Geto Boys chronology
| Uncut Dope: Geto Boys' Best (1992) | Greatest Hits (2002) | Best of the Geto Boys (2008) |

Professional ratings
Review scores
| Source | Rating |
|---|---|
| AllMusic | 4/5 stars |
| The New Rolling Stone Album Guide | 3.5/5 stars |

Greatest Hits is the second compilation album by American hip-hop group the Geto Boys. It was released on November 19, 2002 via Rap-A-Lot Records. The album peaked at number 69 on the US Billboard Top R&B/Hip-Hop Albums chart.

Greatest Hits contains a bonus DVD in some copies and has songs from all of the Geto Boys' albums released up to 2002, from Making Trouble (1988) to Da Good da Bad & da Ugly (1998). There is also a song that had never appeared on any other Geto Boys album, "The Answer to Baby (Mary II)"; this also appeared in group member Scarface's compilation album, Balls and My Word (2003).

== Track listing ==
| No. | Title | Writer(s) | Length |
|---|---|---|---|
| 1. | "Balls & My Word" | Collins Leysath | 3:45 |
| 2. | "Scarface" | Brad Jordan; John Okuribido | 5:04 |
| 3. | "Mind Playin' Tricks" | B. Jordan; William Dennis; Doug King; Isaac Hayes | 5:06 |
| 4. | "Straight Gangstaism" | Michael Barnett; Christopher Barriere; B. Jordan; Okuribido; Michael Dean | 4:26 |
| 5. | "Six Feet Deep" | B. Jordan; Barnett; Joseph Johnson; Marvin Gaye; Lionel Richie | 5:24 |
| 6. | "World Is a Geto" | Thomas Allen; Harold Ray Brown; Morris Dickerson; Lonnie Jordan; Howard Scott; Charles Miller; Lee Oskar | 4:23 |
| 7. | "Geto Boys & Girls" | B. Jordan; Dennis; Dean | 5:58 |
| 8. | "Let a Ho Be a Ho" | James Smith; Dennis; Leysath | 3:41 |
| 9. | "It Ain't" | B. Jordan; Johnson; Bill Withers | 4:31 |
| 10. | "Mind of a Lunatic" | B. Jordan; Dennis; Leysath; King; Kenneth Rogers III | 5:23 |
| 11. | "Chuckie" | Richard Shaw; Smith | 3:45 |
| 12. | "Trigga Happy Nigga" | B. Jordan; Dennis; Smith; Leysath | 4:46 |
| 13. | "Crooked Officer" | B. Jordan; Barnett; Barriere; Johnson | 4:08 |
| 14. | "Gangsta (Put Me Down)" | B. Jordan; Dennis; Dean; Bob James | 4:17 |
| 15. | "Damn It Feels Good to Be a Gangsta" | B. Jordan; Smith; Okuribido | 5:07 |
| 16. | "Geto Fantasy" | B. Jordan; Dennis; D. Miller; Dean; Johnson; Miles Gregory | 4:29 |
| 17. | "The Answer to Baby (Mary II)" | B. Jordan; Dean; Ashanti Douglas; Andre Parker; Irving Lorenzo | 4:16 |
| Total length: | | | 1:18:29 |

== Charts ==
| Chart (2002) | Peak position |
|---|---|
| US Top R&B/Hip-Hop Albums (Billboard) | 69 |
