= Made (Scarface album) =

Studio album by Scarface
- Released: December 4, 2007
- Recorded: 2007
- Studio: Gumbo Funk Studios (Stafford, TX)
- Genre: Hip-hop
- Length: 42:30
- Labels: Rap-A-Lot 4 Life; Asylum
- Producers: Cozmo; Drumma Boy; Enigma; John Bido; Mike Dean; N.O. Joe; Nottz; One Drop Scott; Tone Capone

Scarface chronology
My Homies Part 2 (2006)	Made (2007)	Emeritus (2008)

Made is the ninth solo studio album by American rapper Scarface. It was released on December 4, 2007, via Rap-A-Lot/Asylum Records. Recorded at Gumbo Funk Studios in Stafford, it was produced by N.O. Joe, Mike Dean, Enigma, Tone Capone, Cozmo, Drumma Boy, John Bido, Nottz and One Drop Scott. It features guest appearances from Nina Creque, Tanya Herron, Wacko and Z-Ro.

The album was both critically and commercially successful, making it to number 17 on the Billboard 200, number 2 on the Top R&B/Hip-Hop Albums and topping the Top Rap Albums chart in the United States. Its single, "Girl You Know" featuring R&B singer Trey Songz, became a minor hit, reaching number 51 on the Hot R&B/Hip-Hop Songs chart.

A 'Limited Edition' version was sold exclusively in Target retail stores, and contained a bonus DVD shot and edited by filmmaker REL of REL Entertainment, featuring exclusive interviews, in-studio performances, and behind-the-scenes coverage of Scarface working on the Made album.

== Critical reception ==
Professional ratings
Aggregate scores
Source	Rating
Metacritic	80/100
Review scores
Source	Rating
AllHipHop	8/10 stars
AllMusic	3.5/5 stars
Entertainment Weekly	B
HipHopDX	4/5
Los Angeles Times	3/4 stars
Pitchfork	8/10
RapReviews	8/10
Spin	4/5 stars

Made was met with generally favorable reviews from music critics. At Metacritic, which assigns a normalized rating out of 100 to reviews from mainstream publications, the album received an average score of 80 based on seven reviews.

Tom Breihan of Pitchfork praised the album, stating it "might be a small album, one that never musically ventures outside Scarface's comfort zone, but it's a heavily personal work from someone with a whole lot to say". Pedro 'DJ Complejo' Hernandez of RapReviews called it "not Scarface's best album", continuing "saying this isn't Face's best is no insult. Scarface on his worst day or even in unofficial form (see Balls and My Word) is still better than most other rappers on their best day". Thomas Golianopoulos of Spin resumed, that the album "sounds dirtier (i.e., more Southern) than its polished predecessor, though it still relies on a bevy of soul samples". Simon Vozick-Levinson of Entertainment Weekly wrote: "Scarface acts his age on more thoughtful cuts like 'Who Do You Believe In', which offers a somber take on the many forces that claim innocent inner-city lives, from gang rivalries to the war in Iraq". Jeff Weiss of Los Angeles Times stated: "its well-trodden themes might not break much new ground, but Made succeeds thanks to Scarface's keen storytelling ability, unimpeachable authority and subtle lyrical complexity". AllMusic's David Jeffries concluded: "M.A.D.E. is Scarface doing everything right, delivering those cold, hardcore rhymes over uncomplicated, soulful beats".

== Commercial performance ==
Made debuted and peaked at number 17 on the U.S. Billboard 200 chart and sold about 63,000 units in its debut week.

== Track listing ==
No.	Title	Writer(s)	Producer(s)	Length
1.	"Intro"	James Smith; Michael Dean	Mike Dean	1:07
2.	"Never"	Brad Jordan; Christopher Gholson; Joseph Johnson	Drumma Boy; N.O. Joe	3:00
3.	"Big Dogg Status" (featuring Wacko)	Jordan; Damon Grison; Johnson	N.O. Joe	4:40
4.	"Girl You Know"	Jordan; Dominick Lamb	Nottz	4:14
5.	"Burn" (featuring Z-Ro)	Jordan; Joseph McVey; Johnson	N.O. Joe	3:53
6.	"Go" (featuring Nina Creque)	Jordan; Scott Roberts	One Drop Scott	3:39
7.	"Dollar"	Jordan; Anthony Gilmour	Tone Capone	4:26
8.	"Boy Meets Girl" (featuring Tanya Herron)	Jordan; John Okurbido; Johnson; Dean	John Bido; N.O. Joe; Mike Dean	3:58
9.	"Who Do You Believe In"	Jordan; Richard Hervey	Enigma	4:46
10.	"Git out My Face"	Jordan; Hervey	Enigma	3:23
11.	"The Suicide Note"	Jordan; Gilmour; Cosmo Hickox; Johnson; Dean	Tone Capone; Cozmo; N.O. Joe; Mike Dean	4:08
12.	"Outro"	Smith; Dean	Mike Dean	1:16
Total length:				42:30

Sample credits

- Track 2 contains a portion of "Sara Smile" written by Daryl Hall and John Oates and performed by Ronnie Dyson.
- Track 4 contains a portion of "Because I Love You" written by Michael Barnett and Leonard C. Williams Sr. and performed by Lenny Williams.
- Track 6 contains a portion of "Theme of the Mack" written and performed by Willie Hutch.

== Personnel ==
- Brad "Scarface" Jordan – vocals (tracks: 2–10), lead guitar (track 8), producer
- James "J. Prince" Smith – vocals (tracks: 1, 12), executive producer
- Damon "Wacko" Grison – vocals (track 3)
- Joseph "Z-Ro" McVey – vocals (track 5)
- Nina Creque – vocals (track 6)
- Tanya Herron – vocals (track 8)
- "Uncle Eddie" Wilson – bass guitar (track 8)
- Mike Dean – producer (tracks: 1, 8, 11, 12), mixing, mastering
- Christopher "Drumma Boy" Gholson – producer (track 2)
- Joseph "N.O. Joe" Johnson – producer (tracks: 2, 3, 5, 8, 11), engineering
- Dominick "Nottz" Lamb – producer (track 4)
- Scott "One Drop Scott" Roberts – producer (track 6)
- Anthony "Tone Capone" Gilmour – producer (tracks: 7, 11)
- John Okuribido – producer (track 8)
- Richard "Enigma" Hervey – producer (tracks: 9, 10)
- Cozmo Hickox – producer (track 11)
- Mike Moore – engineering
- Jason Clark – design
- Mario Castellanos – photography

== Charts ==
=== Weekly charts ===
Chart (2007)	Peak position
US Billboard 200	17
US Top R&B/Hip-Hop Albums (Billboard)	2
US Top Rap Albums (Billboard)	1

=== Year-end charts ===
Chart (2008)	Position
US Top R&B/Hip-Hop Albums (Billboard)	39
US Top Rap Albums (Billboard)	16
