= Napoleon discography =

This is the discography of rapper Napoleon.

== Albums ==
=== Solo albums ===
- Napoleon Presents Tha Bonaparz (Unreleased)
  - Released: 2001
  - Label: ---
- Have Mercy (Unreleased)
  - Released: 2005
  - Label: ---
- Napoleon Presents Loyalty Over Money
  - Released: October 3, 2006
  - Label: Paid in Full Entertainment, Loyalty Entertainment LLC, Koch Entertainment

=== Collaboration albums ===
- Still I Rise (with Outlawz)
  - Released: December 21, 1999
  - Label: Amaru Entertainment, Death Row Records, Interscope Records
- Ride wit Us or Collide wit Us (with Outlawz)
  - Released: November 7, 2000
  - Label: Outlaw Recordz, Bayside Entertainment
- Novakane (with Outlawz)
  - Released: October 23, 2001
  - Label: Outlaw Recordz, Koch Records
- Neva Surrenda (with Outlawz)
  - Released: October 22, 2002
  - Label: Outlaw Recordz, Rap-A-Lot Records

== Guest appearances ==
List of non-single guest appearances, with other performing artists, showing year released and album name
Title	Year	Artist(s)	Album
"Tradin' War Stories"	1996	2Pac, Kastro, E.D.I., C-Bo, Storm	All Eyez on Me
"Thug Passion"	1996	2Pac, Kastro, E.D.I., Storm, Jewell	All Eyez on Me
"Run tha Streetz"	1996	2Pac, Michel'le, Storm	All Eyez on Me
"Life of an Outlaw"	1996	Makaveli, Young Noble, E.D.I., Kastro	The Don Killuminati: The 7 Day Theory
"Enemies with Me"	1997	2Pac, Kastro, Yaki Kadafi, E.D.I.	R U Still Down? (Remember Me)
"Games"	1997	Cool-E, Young Noble, J-Sweet, Kastro, E.D.I.	Funk Fo' Life
"Do Yo Thug Thang"	1998	Yukmouth, E.D.I., Young Noble	Thugged Out: The Albulation
"Still Ballin'"	1998	Yukmouth, E.D.I., Young Noble	Thugged Out: The Albulation
"Hard Labor"	1998	C-Bo, Kastro, Young Noble, Storm, Big Lurch	Til My Casket Drops
"MFC Lawz"	1998	Heltah Skeltah, Young Noble, Storm, Doc Holiday	Magnum Force
"This Life of Mine"	1998	Bad Azz, Young Noble, Prince Ital Joe, Kastro, E.D.I.	Word on tha Streets
"I Don't Fuck with You"	1998	Geto Boys, DMG, Gotti, E.D.I., Young Noble, Kastro	Da Good da Bad & da Ugly
"Gun In My Mouth"	1998	Geto Boys, Young Noble, E.D.I.	Da Good da Bad & da Ugly
"How You Want It"	1999	Big Mike, Kastro, Young Noble, E.D.I.	Hard to Hit

- 1999: "Ain't Died In Vain" (Rondo feat. E.D.I., Young Noble, Storm, Napoleon)
- 2001: "All Out" (2Pac feat. E.D.I., Kastro & Napoleon)
- 2002: "Gotz 2 Go" (Young Noble feat. Muszamil, Homicide & Napoleon)
- 2002: "Ball or Die" (Hellraza feat. E.D.I., Kastro, Young Noble & Napoleon)
- 2002: "Born A Souljah" (Kastro & E.D.I. feat. Young Noble, Yukmouth, Muszamil & Napoleon)
- 2004: "Tha Life That We Live" (Cablez feat. Napoleon, Muszamil & Nzingha Shakur)
- 2004: "Reign Supreme" (Louie Loc feat. Napoleon)
- 2005: "Money World" (Killa Tay feat. Napoleon, Missippi & Luni Coleone)
