= J Prince Presents R.N.D.S. =

J Prince Presents Realest Niggaz Down South

Compilation album by various artists
- Released: October 5, 1999
- Recorded: 1999
- Genres: Southern hip hop; gangsta rap; underground hip hop
- Length: 1:56:09
- Labels: Rap-A-Lot; Priority
- Producers: J. Prince (exec.); Domo; Double D; Hurt-M-Badd; Jermaine Dupri; John Bido; John "Swift" Catalon; Leroy "Precise" Edwards; Mannie Fresh; Mike Dean; Mr. Lee; Pimp C; Platinum; Scarface; Tela; Tone Capone

Professional ratings
Review scores
Source	Rating
AllMusic	2.5/5 stars

J Prince Presents R.N.D.S. (Realest Niggaz Down South) is a two-disc compilation album of presented and executive produced by Rap-A-Lot Records CEO J. Prince. It was released on October 5, 1999 through Priority Records.

Production was handled by Mr. Lee, Mike Dean, Domo, Double D, Platinum, Hurt-M-Badd, Jermaine Dupri, John Bido, Mannie Fresh, Pimp C, Precise, Scarface, Swift, Tela and Tone Capone. It is composed of 27 songs performed by many artists from Rap-A-Lot roster of the time, such as Scarface, Tela, Big Mike, Dorasel, Willie D, 5th Ward Boyz, Ghetto Twiinz and Devin the Dude, as well as fellow popular American Southern underground gangsta rap acts, including S.U.C.'s Al-D, Clay-Doe, DJ Screw, E.S.G., Fat Pat and Mike D, Big Tymers, Mystikal and Master P, an early appearance by a then-unknown Ludacris and an appearance from boxer Roy Jones Jr.

The album peaked at No. 58 on the Billboard 200 and No. 7 on the Top R&B/Hip-Hop Albums chart.

The edited version omits 16 songs, drastically reducing the album to only one disc and leaving only 11 songs. A chopped and screwed version of the album was released in 2004 and is currently the only version of this album still in print.

In his review to AllMusic, Steve Huey wrote: "Over the course of two discs, J-Prince Presents: Realest Niggaz Down South tends to lose its momentum with too many mediocre contributions, but the sampler does have its fair share of good moments, which will make it worthwhile at least for some gangsta and Southern rap fans. Highlights come from Scarface, Goodie Mob, UGK, Willie D, Big Mike, MC Breed, 3-6 Mafia, the Hot Boyz, and Devin, among others".

== Track listing ==
No.	Title	Writer(s)	Producer(s)	Length
1.	"One" (performed by Scarface)	Brad Jordan; Michael Poye; Michael Vest	Scarface; Domo; Platinum	4:10
2.	"Woodwheel" (performed by UGK)	Chad Butler; Bernard Freeman; Bettye Crutcher	John Bido; Pimp C	4:56
3.	"Mind on My Money" (performed by DJ Screw, Al-D, Clay-Doe and Mike D)	Robert Earl Davis Jr.; Albert Davis	John "Swift" Catalon	6:22
4.	"Pussy in the Click" (performed by Willie D)	William Dennis; Tyrone Wrice	Hurt-M-Badd	4:52
5.	"Wanna Taste" (performed by MC Breed and Young Lac)	Eric Breed; W. Mokoko; Michael Dean	Mike Dean	4:30
6.	"Catch Up" (performed by Ludacris, Infamous 2-0 and Lil' Fate)	Christopher Bridges; Bobby Sandamanie; Arbie Wilson	Ludacris; Fate Wilson	4:02
7.	"Got 2 Be a Thug" (performed by Dorasel)	Eric Vaughn; Vest; T. Turner	Platinum	4:31
8.	"The Realest" (performed by Scarface)	Jordan; Dean; Anthony Gilmour	Mike Dean; Tone Capone	4:58
9.	"Southern Comfort (The Remix)" (performed by Big Mike and Mystikal)	Michael Barnett; Michael Tyler; Leroy Williams	Mr. Lee	3:53
10.	"Us Bitches" (performed by Ghetto Twiinz)	Tonya Jupiter; Trementhia Jupiter; Williams; T. Edwards	Mr. Lee	4:00
11.	"Paper" (performed by Hoodlumz and Tela)	Barry Ware; Thomas McCollum; Winston Rogers	Leroy "Precise" Edwards	3:44
12.	"Rap-A-Lot Worldwide" (performed by Driza)	A. Bennett; Ware; Williams	Mr. Lee	3:42
13.	"It Goes Down" (performed by OCB)	Lorenzo Johnson; Shedrick Smith; Williams	Mr. Lee	3:45
14.	"U Don't Wanna" (performed by Hot Boyz and Big Tymers)	Bryan Williams; Byron Thomas; Christopher Dorsey; Dwayne Carter; Tab Virgil, Jr.; Terius Gray	Mannie Fresh	5:38
15.	"Dirty Mutherfucka" (performed by C-Loc and K.B.)	S. Carroll; Kevin Brown; Williams	Mr. Lee	4:10
16.	"Homies & Thuggs (The Remix)" (performed by Scarface, Master P and Dorasel)	Jordan; Percy Miller; Vaughn; Williams	Mr. Lee	3:53
17.	"If U Only Knew" (performed by Fat Pat)	Patrick Hawkins; André Sargent	Double D	4:39
18.	"Live to Hustle" (performed by Big Mike)	Barnett; Dean	Mike Dean	3:23
19.	"Payin' for Pussy" (performed by Devin the Dude and Jugg Mugg)	Devin Copeland; Dexter Johnson; Poye	Domo	4:01
20.	"Mo Problems" (performed by Tela)	Rogers	Tela	4:04
21.	"Stop Playin'" (performed by Scarface and Roy Jones Jr.)	Jordan; Roy Jones Jr.; Williams	Mr. Lee	3:11
22.	"Throw It Up" (performed by Ace Deuce)	Anthony Elder; Williams; M. Elder; A. Broussard; K. Lee	Mr. Lee	4:42
23.	"Armageddon Comes" (performed by Three 6 Mafia)	Jordan Houston; Lola Mitchell; Paul Beauregard; Ricky Dunigan; Williams	Mr. Lee	2:43
24.	"Good Nigga" (performed by Goodie Mob)	Cameron Gipp; Robert Barnett; Thomas Callaway; Willie Knighton; Williams	Mr. Lee	4:56
25.	"Crank It Up" (performed by 5th Ward Boyz)	Andre Barnes; Eric Taylor; Richard Nash; Williams	Mr. Lee	4:26
26.	"Do You Wanna Ride" (performed by E.S.G. and Pimp Tyte)	Cedric Hill; S. Breaux; T. Duplechin; Sargent	Double D	5:19
27.	"Why U (The Remix)" (performed by Tela and Jermaine Dupri)	Rogers	Jermaine Dupri	3:39
Total length:				1:56:09

== Charts ==
Chart (1999)	Peak position
US Billboard 200	58
US Top R&B/Hip-Hop Albums (Billboard)	7
