= One Hunid =

Studio album by The Product
- Released: February 21, 2006
- Recorded: 2005–2006
- Genres: Southern hip-hop; gangsta rap
- Length: 53:34
- Label: Koch
- Producers: John Bido; P. King "The Specialist"; Scarface; The Alchemist; Tone Capone; Young Malice

Scarface chronology
The Foundation (2005)	One Hunid (2006)	My Homies Part 2 (2006)

Professional ratings
Review scores
Source	Rating
AllMusic	4/5 stars
IGN	6.5/10
Maxim	7/10
Okayplayer	77/100
PopMatters	8/10
Prefix	8/10
RapReviews	7/10
Rolling Stone	3/5 stars

One Hunid is the only studio album by American short-lived hip-hop trio The Product. It was released on February 21, 2006, via Koch Records. The album was produced by Tone Capone, John Bido, The Alchemist, P. King "The Specialist", and members Scarface and Young Malice. In the United States, the album peaked at number 78 on the Billboard 200, number 14 on the Top R&B/Hip-Hop Albums, and number 5 on both the Top Rap Albums and Independent Albums charts. The album was met with generally favorable reviews from music critics.

== Track listing ==
No.	Title	Writer(s)	Producer(s)	Length
1.	"Get Out"	Willie Henderson; Rodney Sutton; Brad Jordan; Anthony Gilmour	Tone Capone	3:07
2.	"2 Real"	Henderson; Sutton; Jordan; Gilmour	Tone Capone	4:26
3.	"In the Hood"	Henderson; Gilmour	Tone Capone	4:25
4.	"Read"	Henderson; Sutton; Jordan; John Okuribido	John Bido; Scarface	4:08
5.	"Hustle"	Henderson; Sutton; Jordan; Gilmour	Tone Capone	4:37
6.	"G Type"	Henderson; Sutton; Jordan; Alan Maman	The Alchemist	4:22
7.	"Not a Word"	Henderson; Sutton; Jordan	Scarface	3:44
8.	"I'm A"	Henderson; Sutton; Jordan; Peter Francis	P. King "The Specialist"	3:59
9.	"Pride"	Henderson; Sutton; Jordan	Scarface	4:27
10.	"The Love of Money"	Sutton; Jordan; Okuribido	Scarface; John Bido	3:46
11.	"Dead Broke"	Henderson; Sutton; Okuribido	John Bido	4:12
12.	"Don't Matter"	Henderson; Sutton; Jordan; Okuribido	John Bido; Scarface; Young Malice	3:57
13.	"Life's Been Good"	Henderson; Sutton; Jordan; Gilmour	Tone Capone	4:24
Total length:				53:34

== Personnel ==
- Willie Dominic "Willie Hen" Henderson – vocals
- Rodney "Young Malice" Sutton – vocals, producer (track 12)
- Brad "Scarface" Jordan – vocals, producer (tracks: 4, 7, 9, 10, 12), executive producer, art direction
- Tekia Hicks – additional vocals, background vocals
- Luster "Tony Mack" Tone – additional vocals, background vocals
- Anthony "Tone Capone" Gilmour – producer (tracks: 1–3, 5, 13)
- John Bido – producer (tracks: 4, 10–12), creative coordinator
- Alan "The Alchemist" Maman – producer (track 6)
- Peter 'P. King "The Specialist"' Francis – producer (track 8)
- Joe Pasket – design, layout
- Turhan Rhodes II – photography
- Ricardo Lewis – A&R

== Charts ==
Chart (2006)	Peak position
US Billboard 200	78
US Top R&B/Hip-Hop Albums (Billboard)	14
US Top Rap Albums (Billboard)	5
US Independent Albums (Billboard)	5
