= The Dude (Devin the Dude album) =

Studio album by Devin the Dude
- Released: June 16, 1998
- Genre: Southern hip hop
- Length: 1:12:59
- Label: Rap-A-Lot
- Producers: J. Prince (exec.); Scarface (also exec.); Domo; Joe Bythewood; Devin the Dude; Mr. Lee; N.O. Joe; Tone Capone; Daddy Mook; DJ Styles; Joseph "Jo Jo" Hearne; Rob Quest

Devin the Dude chronology
The Dude (1998)	Just Tryin' ta Live (2002)

Professional ratings
Review scores
Source	Rating
AllMusic	3/5 stars
RapReviews	7.5/10
The Source	3.5/5 stars

The Dude is the debut solo studio album by American rapper Devin the Dude. It was released on June 16, 1998, via Rap-A-Lot Records. The production was handled mostly by Michael "Domo" Poye, alongside several other record producers including Joe Bythewood, N.O. Joe, Mr. Lee and Tone Capone. It features guest appearances from K.B., K-Dee, Scarface, Odd Squad, DMG and Spice 1 among others. The title of the album was a reference to the song The Dude by Quincy Jones. The album peaked at number 177 on the Billboard 200 in the United States.

== Track listing ==
No.	Title	Writer(s)	Producer(s)	Length
1.	"The Dude"	D. Copeland; M. Poye; B. Jordan	Domo; Scarface	5:46
2.	"Sticky Green" (featuring Scarface)	D. Copeland; B. Jordan; A. Gilmour	Tone Capone	3:11
3.	"Don't Wait" (featuring DMG and Spice 1)	D. Copeland; H. Armstrong; R. Green; R. McQueen; C. Garza	Vintage Crate Music	4:42
4.	"Do What You Wanna Do"	D. Copeland; J. Johnson; J. Hearne	N.O. Joe; Joseph "Jo Jo" Hearne	4:27
5.	"Mo Fa Me"	D. Copeland; M. Poye	Domo	3:42
6.	"Alright" (featuring Randy Ran)	D. Copeland; M. Poye; J. Bythewood	Domo; Joe Bythewood	4:34
7.	"Bust One Fa Ya"	D. Copeland; J. Bythewood	Joe Bythewood	1:13
8.	"See What I Could Pull"	D. Copeland; M. Poye	Domo; Devin the Dude	5:02
9.	"Write & Wrong"	D. Copeland; M. Poye; J. Bythewood	Domo; Joe Bythewood	5:02
10.	"One Day at a Time" (featuring K-Dee and K.B.)	D. Copeland; K. Brown; B. Jordan; L. Williams	Mr. Lee; Scarface	3:57
11.	"Boo Boo'n"	D. Copeland; M. Poye	Domo	4:28
12.	"Like a Sweet" (featuring Scarface, Jugg Mugg, Killemall, and Ant Live)	D. Copeland; B. Jordan; M. Poye	Domo; Devin the Dude	5:21
13.	"Show 'Em" (featuring K.B.)	D. Copeland; K. Brown; M. Poye; T. Mason	Domo; Daddy Mook	4:36
14.	"Ligole Bips (Southern Girls)" (featuring Odd Squad and K.B.)	D. Copeland; D. Johnson; R. McQueen; K. Brown; M. Poye	Domo	4:36
15.	"Can't Change Me" (featuring K-Dee and K.B.)	D. Copeland; K. Brown; B. Jordan; L. Williams	Mr. Lee; Scarface	4:09
16.	"I Can't Quit"	D. Copeland; J. Johnson	N.O. Joe	4:46
17.	"Georgy" (featuring Kuirshan)	D. Copeland; A. Gilmour; D. Paich	Tone Capone	3:22
Total length:				1:12:59

== Charts ==
Chart (1998)	Peak position
US Billboard 200	177
US Top R&B/Hip-Hop Albums (Billboard)	27
US Heatseekers Albums (Billboard)	5
