= Balls and My Word =

Compilation album by Scarface
- Released: April 8, 2003
- Recorded: 2002–2003
- Studios: Dean's List House of Hits (Houston, TX); Enterprise Studios (Burbank, CA); Larrabee Sounds (North Hollywood, CA); Hippie House Studios (Houston, TX)
- Genres: Southern hip hop; gangsta rap
- Length: 55:15
- Label: Rap-A-Lot
- Producers: 7 Aurelius; Ensayne Wayne; Mike Dean; Mr. Lee; N.O. Joe; Sam Sneed; T-Mix; Tone Capone

Scarface chronology
The Fix (2002)	Balls and My Word (2003)	One Hunid (2006)

Professional ratings
Review scores
Source	Rating
AllMusic	2/5 stars
Entertainment Weekly	B
HipHopDX	4/5
RapReviews	8/10
Rolling Stone	3/5 stars

Balls and My Word is a compilation album by American rapper Scarface. It was released on April 8, 2003, through Rap-A-Lot Records. Recording sessions took place at Dean's List House of Hits and Hippie House Studios in Houston, Enterprise Studios in Burbank and Larrabee Sounds in North Hollywood. Production was handled by Mike Dean, N.O. Joe, T-Mix, Tone Capone, 7 Aurelius, Ensayne Wayne, Mr. Lee and Sam Sneed, with J Prince serving as executive producer. It features guest appearances from Z-Ro, Aries', Bun B, Devin the Dude, Dirt Bomb, Poppa tha Powet, Tanya Herron and Tela. The album peaked at number 20 on the Billboard 200 and number 3 on the Top R&B/Hip-Hop Albums charts in the United States.

Rap-A-Lot Records CEO, J Prince, organized a studio album of unreleased songs recorded by Scarface that were outtakes from previous albums. Balls and My Word was supported with two promotional singles "Recognize" and "Snitch Figga".

== Track listing ==
No.	Title	Writer(s)	Producer(s)	Length
1.	"Balls and My Word" (Intro)	Collins Leysath		1:43
2.	"Recognize"	Brad Jordan; Ferrell Miles	Ensayne Wayne	4:40
3.	"On My Grind" (featuring Z-Ro)	Jordan; Joseph McVey; Triston Jones	T-Mix	4:21
4.	"Bitch Nigga" (featuring Z-Ro, Dirt Bomb and Bun B)	Jordan; McVey; Bernard Freeman; Michael Dean	Mike Dean	4:35
5.	"Stuck at a Standstill"	Jordan; Joseph Johnson	N.O. Joe	3:46
6.	"Strapped" (Interlude)			0:51
7.	"Only Your Mother" (featuring Devin the Dude and Tela)	Jordan; Devin Copeland; Winston Rogers; Jones	T-Mix	4:37
8.	"Make Your Peace"	Jordan; Dean; Anthony Gilmour	Mike Dean; Tone Capone	4:41
9.	"Spend the Night" (featuring Aries')	Jordan; Marcus Vest	7 Aurelius	3:46
10.	"Mary II"	Jordan; Dean; Gilmour	Mike Dean; Tone Capone	4:45
11.	"Dirty Money" (featuring Tanya Herron)	Jordan; Dean	Mike Dean	4:48
12.	"Fuck'n with Face"	Jordan; Sam Anderson	Sam Sneed	4:09
13.	"Invincible"	Jordan; Leroy Williams; Johnson	Mr. Lee; N.O. Joe	3:28
14.	"Real Nigga Blues" (featuring Poppa tha Powet)			5:06
Total length:				55:15

== Personnel ==
- Brad "Scarface" Jordan — vocals
- Joseph "Z-Ro" McVey — vocals (tracks: 3, 4)
- Dirt Bomb — vocals (track 4)
- Bernard "Bun B" Freeman — vocals (track 4)
- Devin "The Dude" Copeland — vocals (track 7)
- Winston "Tela" Rogers — vocals (track 7)
- Aries' — vocals (track 9)
- Tanya Herron — vocals (track 11)
- Poppa tha Powet — vocals (track 14)
- Ferrell "Ensayne Wayne" Miles — producer (track 2)
- Triston "T-Mix" Jones — producer (tracks: 3, 7)
- Mike Dean — producer (tracks: 4, 8, 10, 11), mixing, mastering
- Joseph "N.O. Joe" Johnson — producer (tracks: 5, 13)
- Anthony "Tone Capone" Gilmour — producer (tracks: 8, 10)
- Marcus "7 Aurelius" Vest — producer (track 9)
- Samuel "Sam Sneed" Anderson — producer (track 12)
- Leroy "Mr. Lee" Williams, Jr. — producer (track 13)
- Bob Brown — mixing
- James "J. Prince" Smith — executive producer
- Tony Randle — A&R
- Anzel Jennings — A&R
- Donavin "Kid Styles" Murray — cover design

== Charts ==
=== Weekly charts ===
Chart (2003)	Peak position
US Billboard 200	20
US Top R&B/Hip-Hop Albums (Billboard)	3

=== Year-end charts ===
Chart (2003)	Position
US Top R&B/Hip-Hop Albums (Billboard)	72
