= Uncut Dope: Geto Boys' Best =

Uncut Dope

Compilation album by Geto Boys
- Released: November 17, 1992
- Recorded: 1988–92
- Genre: Gangsta rap; Southern hip hop; horrorcore
- Label: Rap-a-Lot/Priority

Geto Boys chronology
We Can't Be Stopped (1991)	Uncut Dope (1992)	Till Death Do Us Part (1993)

Professional ratings
Review scores
Source	Rating
AllMusic	4/5 stars
The Rolling Stone Album Guide	4/5 stars

Uncut Dope: Geto Boys' Best is a compilation album by the Geto Boys consisting of previously released tracks from the group's Rap-a-Lot albums and two new songs. Released on November 17, 1992, through Priority Records, the compilation peaked at #147 on the Billboard 200.

The compilation's new songs were "The Unseen", which was subject to discussion due to lyrics expressing anti-abortion views, and "Damn It Feels Good to Be a Gangsta", which later appeared in the 1999 film Office Space.

== Content ==
The compilation contained tracks from their first four albums: Grip It! On That Other Level (1989), The Geto Boys (1990) and We Can't Be Stopped (1991), although their first album, Making Trouble (1988), is only represented by the DJ recording, "Balls and My Word" (renamed to "And My Word" in the album's liner notes). Uncut Dope also contained two previously unreleased songs: "The Unseen" (which is the first Geto Boys song with Big Mike) and "Damn It Feels Good to Be a Gangsta". "Action Speaks Louder Than Words" originally appeared on Ganksta N-I-P's The South Park Psycho in 1992.

== Track listing ==
No.	Title	Original album	Length
1.	"Do It Like It G.O."	Grip It! On That Other Level	4:36
2.	"Assassins"	The Geto Boys	5:11
3.	"Mind of a Lunatic"	Grip It! On That Other Level	5:26
4.	"Mind Playin' Tricks on Me"	We Can't Be Stopped	5:11
5.	"Size Ain't Shit"	The Geto Boys	3:42
6.	"The Unseen"	Previously unreleased	3:36
7.	"Balls and My Word"	Making Trouble	3:49
8.	"Scarface"	Grip It! On That Other Level	5:06
9.	"Action Speaks Louder Than Words"	The South Park Psycho (Ganksta N-I-P album)	5:53
10.	"Damn It Feels Good to Be a Gangsta"	Previously unreleased	5:10
11.	"Chuckie"	We Can't Be Stopped	3:48
12.	"Gotta Let Them Hang"	We Can't Be Stopped	4:08

== Charts ==
Chart (1992)	Peak position
Billboard 200	147
Billboard Top R&B/Hip-Hop	31
