= My Homies Part 2 =

Studio album by Scarface
- Released: March 7, 2006
- Recorded: 2005–2006
- Genre: Hip-hop
- Labels: J. Prince; Rap-A-Lot 4 Life
- Producers: Bigg Tyme; N.O. Joe; Tone Capone; Mike Dean; KLC; Tran Chilla; Mr. Fat; Mr. Lee; Criminal Manne; Mr. Mixx; Kanye West; The Legendary Traxster; Don P; Q-Stone; Rakesh; Joe Traxx; Scarface

Scarface chronology
Balls and My Word (2003)	My Homies Part 2 (2006)	Made (2007)

Professional ratings
Review scores
Source	Rating
AllMusic	3.5/5 stars
HipHopDX	3/5 stars
RapReviews	(7/10)
USA Today	3/4 stars

My Homies Part 2 is the eighth studio album by American rapper Scarface. It was released through by Rap-A-Lot on March 7, 2006. This is the sequel to his collaborative album, My Homies (1998). Released as a double album, My Homies Part 2 was a commercial success, debuting at number 12 on the US Billboard 200.

== Track listing ==
Disc 1
No.	Title	Producer(s)	Length
1.	"Intro"	Bigg Tyme	1:09
2.	"Definition of Real" (featuring Z-Ro and Ice Cube)	N.O. Joe	4:08
3.	"Never Snitch" (featuring Beanie Sigel and The Game)	Tone Capone; Scarface	4:22
4.	"Man Cry" (featuring Z-Ro)	Mike Dean	4:30
5.	"Streetlights" (featuring Yung Redd and Lil Ron)	Bigg Tyme	4:03
6.	"We Out Here" (featuring Skip and Ghetto Slaves)	Salih Williams	3:04
7.	"Gotta Get Paid"	Tone Capone; Mike Dean	5:41
8.	"Club Bangaz" (featuring Partners-N-Crime and Juvenile)	KLC	5:43
9.	"Platinum Starz" (featuring Lil' Flip, Chamillionaire, and Bun B)	Bigg Tyme	3:50
10.	"Always" (featuring Spaide R.I.P.P.E.R.)	Tran Chilla	3:40
11.	"Tryin' to Fuck Something" (featuring Vicious)	Mr. Fat	4:18
12.	"Pass the Itchy"	JOE TRAXX	3:11
13.	"Southern Nigga" (featuring Mr. Lee, 8Ball & MJG, E-Rock, Lil' Keke, and Rell)	Mr. Lee	4:51
14.	"My Life" (featuring Geto Boys)	Tone Capone; Mike Dean	4:58

Disc 2
No.	Title	Producer(s)	Length
1.	"Gangsta" (featuring Lil' Keke and Coota Bang)	Mr. Lee	4:11
2.	"Too Much" (featuring Lil' Flip, Criminal Manne, and MJG)	Criminal Manne	5:16
3.	"What It Do" (featuring Yukmouth, E-Rock, and Bun B)	Mr. Mixx	4:28
4.	"Never Snitch (Original)"	Tone Capone; Scarface	4:23
5.	"Pimp Hard" (featuring Z-Ro, Pimp C, Juvenile, and Petey Pablo)	Mr. Lee	6:29
6.	"Deez Bitches" (featuring Lil Ron, Devin the Dude, and Dolla Boy)	Bigg Tyme	4:02
7.	"Crazy" (featuring Dolla Boy, Mike Jones, and Billy Cook)	Bigg Tyme	4:15
8.	"The Corner (Remix)" (Common featuring Scarface, Kanye West, the Last Poets, and Mos Def)	Kanye West	3:16
9.	"Street Shit" (featuring Do or Die)	The Legendary Traxster	4:54
10.	"Twinkle Twinkle" (featuring Trilltown Mafia)	Don P	4:02
11.	"Problems" (featuring Trae)	Q-Stone; Rakesh	6:01

== Chart positions ==
=== Weekly charts ===
Chart (2006)	Peak position
US Billboard 200	12
US Top R&B/Hip-Hop Albums (Billboard)	3

=== Year-end charts ===
Chart (2006)	Position
US Top R&B/Hip-Hop Albums (Billboard)	83
