= The Last of a Dying Breed =

Studio album by Scarface
- Released: October 3, 2000
- Genre: Hip hop
- Length: 56:13
- Labels: Rap-A-Lot; Virgin
- Producers: Scarface; N.O. Joe; Mr. Lee; Erick Sermon; Mike Dean; Swift; Tone Capone

Scarface chronology
My Homies (1998)	The Last of a Dying Breed (2000)	The Fix (2002)

Singles from The Last Of A Dying Breed
- 1. "It Ain't, Pt. 2" Released: 2000; 2. "Look Me In My Eyes" Released: 2000

Professional ratings
Review scores
Source	Rating
AllMusic	3/5 stars
The A.V. Club	average
HipHopDX	4/5 stars
NME	9/10
PopMatters	favorable
RapReviews	8.5/10
The Rolling Stone Album Guide	2.5/5 stars
Vibe	3/5 stars

The Last of a Dying Breed is the sixth studio album by American rapper Scarface. The album was released on October 3, 2000, by Rap-A-Lot Records and Virgin Records. The album was less successful commercially than his last few efforts, but more successful critically. It debuted at number 7 on the Billboard 200 chart, selling 133,972 copies in its first week being certified Gold by the RIAA.

The album includes the singles "Look Me in My Eyes" and "It Ain't, Pt. 2". The song, "They Down with Us" is a remake of the Boogie Down Productions classic, "I'm Still #1".

== Track listing ==
No.	Title	Producer(s)	Length
1.	"11-09-70 (Intro)"	N.O. Joe; Mr. Lee	0:32
2.	"The Last of a Dying Breed"	N.O. Joe; Scarface; Mr. Lee	3:11
3.	"Look Me in My Eyes"	N.O. Joe; Mr. Lee	3:36
4.	"It Ain't Part II"	Erick Sermon; N.O. Joe	3:13
5.	"They Down with Us" (featuring UGK)	N.O. Joe; Mr. Lee	4:43
6.	"Sorry for What?"	N.O. Joe	4:38
7.	"O.G. to Me" (featuring Jayo Felony and Tha Dogg Pound)	Scarface; Mike Dean	5:13
8.	"The Gangsta Shit"	N.O. Joe; Mr. Lee	4:13
9.	"Conspiracy Theory"	N.O. Joe; Scarface; Mr. Lee	3:39
10.	"Watch Ya Step"	Scarface; N.O. Joe; Swift	3:42
11.	"Get Out" (featuring Jay-Z and Nino Storm)	Mr. Lee	3:27
12.	"In & Out" (featuring Too Short and Devin the Dude)	Mr. Lee	4:35
13.	"And Yo" (featuring Redman and Young Noble)	Mr. Lee	4:55
14.	"In My Time"	Scarface; Tone Capone; Mike Dean	5:44
15.	"11-09-2000 (Outro)"	Mr. Lee	0:57

== Chart positions ==
=== Weekly charts ===
Chart (2000)	Peak position
US Billboard 200	7
US Top R&B/Hip-Hop Albums (Billboard)	2

=== Year-end charts ===
Chart (2000)	Position
US Top R&B/Hip-Hop Albums (Billboard)	60

== Certifications ==
Region	Certification	Certified units/sales
United States (RIAA)	Gold	500,000^{^}
^{^} Shipments figures based on certification alone.
