= I Tried (disambiguation) =

"I Tried" is a 2007 song by Bone Thugs-n-Harmony.

I Tried may also refer to:

- I Tried, a 2007 semi-autobiographical film about Bone Thugs-n-Harmony
- "I Tried", a song by the Geto Boys from the album The Foundation, 2005
- "I Tried", a 2001 song by Mull Historical Society
