= Trinity Garden Cartel =

American hip hop group

- Origin: Houston
- Genres: Southern hip hop, Gangsta rap
- Years active: 1992–present
- Labels: Rap-A-Lot Records, Priority Records, Cartel Records, Revolution Records
- Members: D, Gangsta Gee, Herb Mann
- Past members: Ice Water Slaughter, Sinister Sam, X-Man
- Website: trinitygardencartel.com

Trinity Garden Cartel are an American Southern hip hop group from Houston, Texas, most significantly known for their controversial 1994 release on Rap-A-Lot Records, Don't Blame It On Da Music.

== Discography ==
Studio albums

Year	Album title	Charts
1992	The Ghetto My Hood	—
1994	Don't Blame It On Da Music	75
1995	Straight Texas Hoodlum	
1995	Game Done Changed	
1996	Da Saga Continues	—
1997	I Love N.I.G.G.A.Z.	
1999	I'd Rather Be Judged by 12 Than Carried by 6	—
2009	Street Life On Wax Volume 1 (CDr, Mixed)	—
"—" indicates albums that did not chart.
