= The Untouchable (album) =

Studio album by Scarface
- Released: March 11, 1997
- Studios: Hippie House (Houston, TX); The Atomic Dog (Houston, TX); The Enterprise (Burbank, CA)
- Genre: Hip-hop
- Length: 55:31
- Labels: Rap-A-Lot; Noo Trybe
- Producers: Domo; Dr. Dre; John Bido; Jo Jo; Mike Dean; N.O. Joe; Scarface; Tone Capone

Scarface chronology
The Diary (1994)	The Untouchable (1997)	My Homies (1998)

Singles from The Untouchable
- 1. "Smile" Released: February 13, 1997; 2. "Game Over" Released: 1997

Professional ratings
Review scores
Source	Rating
AllMusic	2.5/5 stars
Entertainment Weekly	C+
Los Angeles Times	3/4 stars
Muzik	6/10
NME	3/10
RapReviews	7/10
The New Rolling Stone Album Guide	3/5 stars
The Source	4/5 stars

The Untouchable is the fourth solo studio album by American rapper Scarface. It was released on March 11, 1997 through Rap-A-Lot Records. Recording sessions took place at Hippie House and at the Atomic Dog in Houston and at the Enterprise in Burbank. Production was handled by Mike Dean, N.O. Joe, Tone Capone, Domo, Dr. Dre, John Bido, Joseph "Jo Jo" Hearne, and Scarface himself, who also served as executive producer together with "J" Prince. It features guest appearances from 2Pac, Daz Dillinger, Dr. Dre, Ice Cube, Johnny P, Lisa Crawford and Too $hort, as well as contributions from Devin the Dude, K.B. and Roger Troutman.

The album combines elements of Southern gangsta rap with stylistic influences from g-funk, moving beyond a strictly Houston-centered production approach to present a more polished and cross-regional sound.

== Commercial performance ==
In the United States, the album debuted at number one on the Billboard 200, becoming Scarface's sole album to reach that position; it also peaked atop the Top R&B/Hip-Hop Albums chart for two weeks, giving him his second number-one album on that chart. The album sold 169,000 copies in its first week, and was certified Platinum by the Recording Industry Association of America on May 16, 1997.

Its lead single "Smile" reached number 12 on the Billboard Hot 100 and was certified gold by the RIAA on August 8, 1997. The album's second single, "Game Over", made it to number 34 on the UK singles chart and number 50 on the New Zealand singles chart. The song "Mary Jane" was released as a promotional single.

== Track listing ==
No.	Title	Writer(s)	Producer(s)	Length
1.	"Intro"			0:56
2.	"Untouchable"	Brad Jordan; Michael Dean	Scarface; N.O. Joe; Mike Dean; Tone Capone	4:13
3.	"No Warning"	Jordan; Dean; Eddie Wilson; Joseph Johnson	Scarface; N.O. Joe; Mike Dean; John Bido	2:36
4.	"Southside"	Jordan; Dean	Scarface; Mike Dean; Tone Capone	2:13
5.	"Sunshine" (featuring Lisa Crawford)	Jordan; Johnson	Scarface; N.O. Joe	3:53
6.	"Money Makes the World Go Round" (featuring Daz)	Jordan; Devin Copeland; Delmar Arnaud; Dean	Scarface; Mike Dean; Tone Capone	4:29
7.	"For Real"	Jordan; Dean	Scarface; N.O. Joe; Mike Dean	4:32
8.	"Ya Money or Ya Life"	Jordan; Johnson	Scarface; N.O. Joe; Jo Jo	5:19
9.	"Mary Jane"	Jordan; Dean	Scarface; Mike Dean; Tone Capone	4:41
10.	"Smile" (featuring 2Pac and Johnny P)	Jordan; Dean; Tupac Shakur	Scarface; Mike Dean; Tone Capone	5:00
11.	"Smartz"	Jordan; Dean	Scarface; Mike Dean; Tone Capone	5:05
12.	"Faith"	Jordan; Dean; Michael Poye	Scarface; Mike Dean; Tone Capone; Domo	5:57
13.	"Game Over" (featuring Dr. Dre, Ice Cube and Too $hort)	Jordan; Andre Young; O'Shea Jackson; Richard Vick	Dr. Dre	4:50
14.	"Outro"			1:47
Total length:				55:31

Notes

- Track 2 contains additional vocals from Roger Troutman.
- Track 6 contains additional vocals from Devin "The Dude" Copeland and Kevin "K.B." Brown.
- Track 11 contains additional vocals from Devin "The Dude" Copeland.

== Personnel ==
- Brad "Scarface" Jordan – vocals, producer (tracks: 2-12), mixing, executive producer
- Lisa Crawford – vocals (track 5)
- Delmar "Daz Dillinger" Arnaud – vocals (track 6)
- Tupac "2Pac" Shakur – vocals (track 10)
- Johnny P. – vocals (track 10)
- Andre "Dr. Dre" Young – vocals & producer (track 13)
- O'Shea "Ice Cube" Jackson – vocals (track 13)
- Todd "Too $hort" Shaw – vocals (track 13)
- Mike Dean – producer (tracks: 2-4, 6, 7, 9-12), engineering, mixing, mastering
- Joseph "N.O. Joe" Johnson – producer (tracks: 2, 3, 5, 7, 8)
- Anthony "Tone Capone" Gilmour – producer (tracks: 2, 4, 6, 9-12)
- John Okuribido – producer (track 3)
- Joseph "Jo Jo" Hearne – producer (track 8)
- Michael "Domo" Poye – producer (track 12)
- Jeff Griffin – engineering assistant
- James "J Prince" Smith – executive producer
- Jason Clark – art direction, design
- Mario Castellanos – photography
- Talmadge Harris – production coordinator
- Tony "Big Chief" Randle – production supervisor

== Charts ==
=== Weekly charts ===
Chart (1997)	Peak position
US Billboard 200	1
US Top R&B/Hip-Hop Albums (Billboard)	1

=== Year-end charts ===
Chart (1997)	Position
US Billboard 200	67
US Top R&B/Hip-Hop Albums (Billboard)	12

== Certifications ==
Region	Certification	Certified units/sales
United States (RIAA)	Platinum	1,000,000^{^}
^{^} Shipments figures based on certification alone.

== See also ==
- List of Billboard 200 number-one albums of 1997
- List of Billboard number-one R&B albums of 1997
