= Till Death Do Us Part (Geto Boys album) =

Studio album by Geto Boys
- Released: March 9, 1993
- Studios: Jungle Style (Houston, TX); Digital Services (Houston, TX)
- Genre: Hip-hop
- Length: 1:04:58
- Labels: Rap-A-Lot; Priority
- Producers: John Bido; J. Prince; N.O. Joe; Tony Randle

Geto Boys chronology
We Can't Be Stopped (1991)	Till Death Do Us Part (1993)	The Resurrection (1996)

Singles from Till Death to Us Part
- 1. "Crooked Officer" Released: January 13, 1993; 2. "Six Feet Deep" Released: May 28, 1993; 3. "Straight Gangstaism" Released: October 4, 1993

Professional ratings
Review scores
Source	Rating
AllMusic	2.5/5 stars
Robert Christgau	(dud)
RapReviews	8/10
Rolling Stone	3.5/5 stars
The New Rolling Stone Album Guide	3/5 stars
The Source	3.5/5 stars

Till Death Do Us Part is the fourth studio album by American hip-hop group the Geto Boys. It was released on March 9, 1993, via Rap-A-Lot/Priority Records. The recording sessions took place at Jungle Style Studios and Digital Services in Houston. The album was produced by John Bido, J. Prince, N.O. Joe, and Tony Randle. Member Willie D, who temporarily had left the group in 1992 to pursue a solo career, was replaced by fellow Rap-A-Lot Records labelmate Big Mike.

In the United States, the album peaked at number 11 on the Billboard 200 and atop the Top R&B/Hip-Hop Albums charts. It was certified gold by the Recording Industry Association of America on May 10, 1993 for selling 500,000 units in the US alone. The album was supported with three singles: "Crooked Officer", "Six Feet Deep" and "Straight Gangstaism". Its lead single, "Crooked Officer", made it only to number 70 on the Hot R&B/Hip-Hop Songs and number 4 on the Hot Rap Songs charts. The album's second single, "Six Feet Deep", reached number 40 on the Billboard Hot 100, number 37 on the Hot R&B/Hip-Hop Songs and number 2 on the Hot Rap Songs charts. The song "Street Life" was originally released as an individual single for the soundtrack of the 1992 film South Central. The album version for "Straight Gangstaism" has two verses by Big Mike and one by his Convicts cohort Mr. 3-2, and it was released as a single to boost Big Mike's popularity as a Geto Boys member. To avoid confusion among fans and to improve promotion, the video version (and the radio edit) added a fourth verse by Scarface to the end of the song.

Music videos were directed for the songs off of the album, "Street Life", "Six Feet Deep", "Crooked Officer" and "Straight Gangstaism".

== Track listing ==
No.	Title	Length
1.	"Intro" (featuring J. Prince)	3:33
2.	"G.E.T.O."	3:13
3.	"It Ain't Shit"	4:39
4.	"Crooked Officer"	3:59
5.	"No Nuts No Glory"	3:44
6.	"Six Feet Deep"	5:24
7.	"Murder Avenue"	4:04
8.	"Raise Up"	3:29
9.	"Murder After Midnight"	4:17
10.	"Straight Gangstaism" (featuring Mr. 3-2)	4:26
11.	"Cereal Killer"	3:03
12.	"This Dick's for You"	5:33
13.	"Street Life"	5:21
14.	"Bring It On" (featuring 2-Low, Seagram, Too Much Trouble, 5th Ward Boyz, Odd Squad, Ganksta N-I-P, DMG, Mr. 3-2 and Big Mello)	8:16
15.	"Outro" (featuring J. Prince)	1:49
Total length:		1:04:58

== Personnel ==
- Brad "Scarface" Jordan – vocals
- Richard "Bushwick Bill" Shaw – vocals
- Michael "Big Mike" Barnett – vocals
- Mike Dean – guitar, keyboards, bass guitar, engineering, mixing, mastering
- Preston Middleton – bass guitar, percussion
- Roger Tausz – bass guitar
- Michael "DJ Domination" Poye – scratches
- John Okuribido – producer, engineering, mixing
- James "J. Prince" Smith – producer, mixing, executive producer, management
- Joseph "N.O. Joe" Johnson – producer, mixing, mastering
- Tony "Big Chief" Randle – producer, management
- John Moran – mastering
- Nick Cooper – mastering
- Leroy Robinson, Jr. – art direction, design
- Guy Guillet – photography

== Charts ==
Chart (1993)	Peak position
US Billboard 200	11
US Top R&B/Hip-Hop Albums (Billboard)	1

== Certifications ==
Region	Certification	Certified units/sales
United States (RIAA)	Gold	500,000^{^}
^{^} Shipments figures based on certification alone.

== See also ==
- List of Billboard number-one R&B albums of 1993
