= The Diary (Scarface album) =

Studio album by Scarface
- Released: October 18, 1994
- Genres: Southern hip-hop; gangsta rap; mafioso rap; hardcore hip-hop; horrorcore
- Length: 43:13
- Labels: Rap-A-Lot; Noo Trybe
- Producers: Brad Jordan; Mike Dean; N.O. Joe; Uncle Eddie

Scarface chronology
The World Is Yours (1993)	The Diary (1994)	The Untouchable (1997)

Singles from The Diary
- 1. "I Seen a Man Die" Released: September 27, 1994; 2. "Hand of the Dead Body" Released: February 7, 1995

Professional ratings
Review scores
Source	Rating
AllMusic	4/5 stars
Chicago Tribune	2.5/4 stars
Entertainment Weekly	B
Pitchfork	9.3/10
RapReviews	(9.5/10)
The Source	5/5
Robert Christgau	(choice cut)
Rolling Stone	(favorable)
The Rolling Stone Album Guide	4.5/5 stars
XXL	5/5

The Diary is the third studio album by American rapper Scarface. The album was released on October 18, 1994, by Rap-A-Lot and Noo Trybe. This album is one of the few to receive a perfect rating from both The Source and XXL. The album debuted at No. 2 on the Billboard 200 albums chart, and was certified Platinum by the RIAA on December 5, 1994.

Two singles were released from the album, "Hand of the Dead Body", which featured Ice Cube and Devin the Dude, peaked at 74 on the US Billboard Hot 100 chart, while "I Seen a Man Die" peaked at 37 on the chart, becoming his first top 40 hit. Due to business reasons and for more accessibility, both track titles were changed to "People Don't Believe" and "Never Seen a Man Cry" in their single version. The song "No Tears" was featured in the beginning of the 1999 film Office Space.

== Track listing ==
No.	Title	Producer(s)	Length
1.	"Intro"	Scarface; Mike Dean	1:07
2.	"The White Sheet"	N.O. Joe	3:53
3.	"No Tears"	N.O. Joe; Scarface	2:26
4.	"Jesse James"	N.O. Joe; Scarface; Mike Dean; John Bellmer	4:13
5.	"G's"	N.O. Joe; Mike Dean	4:39
6.	"I Seen a Man Die"	N.O. Joe; Scarface; Mike Dean	4:32
7.	"One"	N.O. Joe; Mike Dean	4:43
8.	"Goin' Down"	N.O. Joe; Scarface; Mike Dean; Uncle Eddie	4:28
9.	"One Time (Interlude)"	Mike Dean	0:58
10.	"Hand of the Dead Body" (featuring Ice Cube and Devin the Dude)	N.O. Joe; Scarface; Mike Dean; Uncle Eddie	4:39
11.	"Mind Playin' Tricks '94"	N.O. Joe; Mike Dean	3:40
12.	"The Diary"	N.O. Joe	2:23
13.	"Outro"	Uncle Eddie	1:30
Total length:			43:13

== Samples ==
- "Goin' Down"
  - "99 Luftballons" by Nena
- "I Seen a Man Die"
  - "Light My Fire" by Julie Driscoll and Brian Auger and the Trinity
- "Jesse James"
  - "If I Was Your Girlfriend" by Prince
- "G's"
  - "Doctor Who Theme Music" by Ron Grainer and Delia Derbyshire

== Charts ==
=== Weekly charts ===
Chart (1994)	Peak position
US Billboard 200	2
US Top R&B/Hip-Hop Albums (Billboard)	2

Chart (2026)	Peak position
German Albums (Offizielle Top 100)	83
German Hip-Hop Albums (Offizielle Top 100)	20

=== Year-end charts ===
Chart (1994)	Position
US Top R&B/Hip-Hop Albums (Billboard)	27
Chart (1995)	Position
US Billboard 200	98
US Top R&B/Hip-Hop Albums (Billboard)	15

== Certifications ==
Region	Certification	Certified units/sales
United States (RIAA)	Platinum	1,000,000^{^}
^{^} Shipments figures based on certification alone.
