= The Resurrection (Geto Boys album) =

Studio album by Geto Boys
- Released: April 2, 1996
- Recorded: 1995–1996
- Studios: Lil J's Studio (Houston, TX)
- Genres: Hardcore hip-hop; gangsta rap
- Length: 57:27
- Label: Rap-A-Lot
- Producers: Derick Edwards; Mike Dean; N.O. Joe; Scarface; Uncle Eddie

Geto Boys chronology
Till Death Do Us Part (1993)	The Resurrection (1996)	Da Good da Bad & da Ugly (1998)

Singles from The Resurrection
- 1. "The World Is a Ghetto" Released: March 16, 1996

Professional ratings
Review scores
Source	Rating
AllMusic	4/5 stars
The Encyclopedia of Popular Music	3/5 stars
Entertainment Weekly	B+
Los Angeles Times	3/4 stars
Muzik	3/5 stars
RapReviews	8/10
Rolling Stone	3/5 stars
The Village Voice	(choice cut)

The Resurrection is the fifth studio album by the American hip-hop group the Geto Boys. It was released on April 2, 1996, via Rap-A-Lot Records. Recording sessions took place at Lil J's Studio in Houston. Production was handled by Mike Dean, Scarface, N.O. Joe, Derick Edwards and Uncle Eddie. It features guest appearances from Facemob, FLAJ and Menace Clan.

In the United States, the album peaked at number six on the Billboard 200 and atop the Top R&B/Hip-Hop Albums charts. It was certified gold by the Recording Industry Association of America on June 4, 1996 for selling 500,000 copies in the US alone. Its lead single, "The World Is a Ghetto", made it to number 82 on the Billboard Hot 100 in the US and number 49 on the UK singles chart, and was featured in Original Gangstas: The Soundtrack.

The song "Still" was used in the 1999 film Office Space and on 2008 the Family Guy season seven episode "I Dream of Jesus". On the television series Silicon Valley, the song "First Light of the Day" was used in the closing credits of the fourth episode of the show's sixth season "Maximizing Alphaness" in 2019.

It is considered by fans to be one of the group's most critically praised albums and the first of two especially creative albums, followed by 1998's Da Good da Bad & da Ugly.

== Critical reception ==
The Resurrection has received positive reviews, with some reviewers calling the album the best album the Geto Boys have ever made. In a positive review, AllMusic's Stephen Thomas Erlewine wrote "The Resurrection outstrips every other Geto Boys record in every sense -- it is the leanest, meanest, and funkiest thing they've ever recorded". James Bernard of Entertainment Weekly gave the album a B+, writing "What makes this their best work is the album's festive mood, despite its harsh subject matter".

In 2005, the comedian Chris Rock ranked The Resurrection 15th on his list of the Top-25 Hip-Hop Albums ever.

== Track listing ==
No.	Title	Writer(s)	Producer(s)	Length
1.	"Ghetto Prisoner"			1:25
2.	"Still"	Brad Jordan; Willie Dennis; Joseph Johnson	N.O. Joe	4:00
3.	"The World Is a Ghetto" (featuring Flaj)	Thomas Allen; Harold Ray Brown; B.B. Dickerson; Lonnie Jordan; Howard E. Scott; Charles Miller; Lee Oskar	Mike Dean; N.O. Joe	4:25
4.	"Open Minded" (featuring DMG)	B. Jordan; Dennis; D. Jones; Michael Dean; Johnson	Mike Dean; N.O. Joe	4:10
5.	"Killer 4 Scratch"			0:36
6.	"Hold It Down" (featuring Facemob)	B. Jordan; Loretta Dorsey; Jones; Roderick Smith; Dean	Scarface; Mike Dean	5:27
7.	"Blind Leading the Blind" (featuring Menace Clan)	B. Jordan; Dennis; Walter Adams; Dante Miller; Dean	Mike Dean; Scarface	5:04
8.	"First Light of the Day"	B. Jordan; Dennis; Dean; Eddie Wilson	Mike Dean; Uncle Eddie; Scarface	5:07
9.	"Time Taker"	B. Jordan; Dennis; Dean	Mike Dean	5:12
10.	"Geto Boys and Girls"	B. Jordan; Dennis; Dean	Mike Dean; Scarface	5:59
11.	"Geto Fantasy"	B. Jordan; Dennis; Dean; Johnson; D. Miller; Miles Gregory	Mike Dean; N.O. Joe	4:30
12.	"I Just Wanna Die"	B. Jordan; Dean; Johnson	Mike Dean; N.O. Joe	4:00
13.	"Niggas and Flies"	Dennis; Derick Edwards	Derick Edwards	3:09
14.	"A Visit with Larry Hoover"			1:25
15.	"Point of No Return"	B. Jordan; Dennis; Dean	Scarface; Mike Dean	3:06
Total length:				57:27

Note

- Tracks 1, 3, 5, 7, 9, 12 & 14 are omitted on the vinyl LP, cutting the album's track listing in half for that format.

== Charts ==
=== Weekly charts ===
Chart (1996)	Peak position
Canada Top Albums/CDs (RPM)	29
US Billboard 200	6
US Top R&B/Hip-Hop Albums (Billboard)	1

=== Year-end charts ===
Chart (1996)	Position
US Billboard 200	120
US Top R&B/Hip-Hop Albums (Billboard)	15

== Certifications ==
Region	Certification	Certified units/sales
United States (RIAA)	Gold	500,000^{^}
^{^} Shipments figures based on certification alone.

== See also ==
- List of Billboard number-one R&B albums of 1996
