= Mind Playing Tricks on Me =

1991 single by Geto Boys

Single by Geto Boys

from the album We Can't Be Stopped
- Released: July 1, 1991
- Recorded: 1991
- Genre: Southern hip-hop; horrorcore; gangsta rap
- Length: 5:11
- Label: Rap-A-Lot; Priority
- Songwriters: Brad Jordan; Doug King; William Dennis
- Producer: Scarface

Geto Boys singles chronology
"Do It Like a G.O." (1990)	"Mind Playing Tricks on Me" (1991)	"I Ain't With Being Broke" (1992)

Audio sample
- "Mind Playing Tricks on Me": file; help

"Mind Playing Tricks on Me" is a song by Geto Boys, featured on their 1991 album We Can't Be Stopped. The lyrics describe the mental anguish and exhaustion of life as a gangster, including dealing with symptoms of post-traumatic stress disorder, paranoia, suicidal ideation, and loneliness. It also samples "Hung Up on My Baby" by Isaac Hayes, from his 1974 film Tough Guys. At the song's peak, it reached 23 on the Billboard Hot 100, making it the highest-charting single by the Geto Boys.

== Background ==
The song was originally intended for a Scarface solo album as he penned three of the song's four verses. However, the Geto Boys' label, Rap-A-Lot Records, decided that the record would be more valuable as a breakout single for the group.

On an episode of Yo! MTV Raps: Classic Cuts, Scarface and his grandmother spoke about how she inspired the track "Mind Playing Tricks on Me". Scarface's grandmother was reportedly mumbling to herself, and when asked, "'Mama, what you talkin' about?'" replied, "'Oh, nothing, my mind's just playing tricks on me'".

In 1994, Scarface recorded a new solo version of the song titled "Mind Playin' Tricks '94", for his album The Diary.

== Reception and legacy ==
"Mind Playing Tricks on Me" has received critical praise since it was first released. In 2012, Rolling Stone magazine ranked it the fifth greatest hip-hop song of all time and at number 192 on their "Top 500 Best Songs of All Time". The song was ranked number 18 out of 100 Best Rap Songs of All Time by LiveAbout. VH1 ranked the song 82 on its list of the 100 Greatest Songs of the 90's, and 45 on its list of the 100 Greatest Songs of Hip-Hop. Pitchfork ranked the song 45 on its Top 200 Tracks of the 1990s list, with reviewer Tom Breihan writing, "this track established the South as a serious force in the music, proving that these Texans could do dark better than anyone on either coast". The song was also included in The Pitchfork 500, a compilation book of the greatest 500 songs from 1976 to 2006.

On a 2019 episode of NPR's Morning Edition, Rodney Carmichael described the song as unique because at the time of its release it emphasized the trauma and vulnerability of life in the streets.

=== References and sampling ===
"Mind Playing Tricks on Me" has been referenced and sampled by numerous artists. The Kottonmouth Kings made a cover of the song for their 2001 album, Hidden Stash II: The Kream of the Krop. The Insane Clown Posse also covered the song with Anybody Killa (also known as ABK) and Lil Wyte on their 2012 album, Smothered, Covered & Chunked. Rapper Kodak Black sampled the song in his song, "Transportin'".

In a 2012 Complex magazine interview, rapper Kid Cudi cited "Mind Playing Tricks on Me" as his "favorite song in the world". Kid Cudi further revealed that the song was the inspiration for his hit single, "Day 'n' Nite", saying, "I love it so much I wanted to make my own version of it. And then "Day 'n' Nite" came out of it".

It was also featured on Grand Theft Auto V's fictional radio station West Coast Classics.

Hip-hop group Clipping's 2020 album Visions of Bodies Being Burned is titled after a lyric in the song.

== Track listing ==
1. "Mind Playing Tricks on Me" (radio version)
2. "Mind Playing Tricks on Me" (dirty version)
3. "Mind Playing Tricks on Me" (club version)
4. "Mind Playing Tricks on Me" (instrumental)

== Charts ==
Chart (1991–1992)	Peak position
US Billboard Hot 100	23
US Hot Dance Music/Maxi-Singles Sales (Billboard)	32
US Hot R&B/Hip-Hop Songs (Billboard)	10
US Hot Rap Songs (Billboard)	1

== Certifications ==
Region	Certification	Certified units/sales
United States (RIAA)	Gold	500,000^{^}
^{^} Shipments figures based on certification alone.
