= Da Good da Bad & da Ugly =

Studio album by Geto Boys
- Released: November 17, 1998
- Studios: Hippie House Studios (Houston, TX)
- Genres: Southern hip-hop; gangsta rap
- Length: 72:56
- Label: Rap-A-Lot
- Producers: Hurt-M-Badd; Jay Sinnusta; Mike Dean; Mr. Lee; N.O. Joe; Scarface; Swift; Tone Capone

Geto Boys chronology
The Resurrection (1996)	Da Good da Bad & da Ugly (1998)	The Foundation (2005)

Professional ratings
Review scores
Source	Rating
AllMusic	2.5/5 stars
Chicago Tribune	(unfavorable)
The New Rolling Stone Album Guide	2/5 stars
The Source	4/5 stars

Da Good da Bad & da Ugly is the sixth studio album by American hip-hop group Geto Boys. It was released on November 17, 1998, through Rap-A-Lot/Virgin Records. Recording sessions took place at Hippie House Studios in Houston. Production was handled by Mike Dean, Mr. Lee, Scarface, Tone Capone, Hurt-M-Badd, Jay Sinnusta, John "Swift" Catalon and N.O. Joe. It features guest appearances from DMG, Dorasel, Outlawz, Yukmouth, 007, Caine, Devin the Dude, Ghetto Twiinz, Gorilla Click, Gotti, K.B., Madd Dogg and Tela.

The album peaked at number 26 on the Billboard 200 and number 5 on the Top R&B/Hip-Hop Albums charts in the United States.

== Background ==
Following the short-lived reunion of the group's three core members, Scarface, Willie D and Bushwick Bill, for 1996's acclaimed The Resurrection album, Bushwick left to pursue a solo career, leaving Scarface and Willie D to continue on as a duo. Unlike past Geto Boys albums, this one has a guest rapper on nearly every track. Following the release of Da Good da Bad & da Ugly, the group split up for solo careers, until returning over six years later (with Bushwick Bill) with the reunion album The Foundation.

== Track listing ==
No.	Title	Writer(s)	Producer(s)	Length
1.	"Intro"			0:42
2.	"Dawn 2 Dusk" (featuring DMG, Caine and Yukmouth)	William Dennis; Jerold Ellis; Harold Armstrong; Leroy Williams	Mr. Lee	4:37
3.	"Livin' 4 the Moment" (featuring DMG)	Brad Jordan; Dennis; Armstrong; Joseph Johnson; Michael Dean	Scarface; Mike Dean; N.O. Joe	4:00
4.	"Niggas Ain't Doin' Shit"			1:18
5.	"Eye 4 an Eye"	Jordan; Dennis; John Catalon	Swift	5:00
6.	"Bitches & Hoes" (featuring Tela)	Jordan; Dennis; Winston Rogers; Anthony Gilmour; Dean	Mike Dean; Tone Capone	4:29
7.	"Why U Playin'" (featuring Dorasel)	Jordan; Dennis; Eric Vaughn; Gilmour; Dean	Mike Dean; Tone Capone	4:43
8.	"Like Some Ho's" (featuring Devin the Dude)	Jordan; Dennis; Devin Copeland; Dean	Mike Dean	4:29
9.	"I Don't Fuck With You" (featuring Outlawz, DMG and Gotti)	Jordan; Dennis; Armstrong; J. Baker; Mutah Beale; Rufus Cooper; Malcolm Greenidge; Katari Cox; James White	Jay Sinnusta	4:46
10.	"Do Yo Time" (featuring Ghetto Twiinz)	Jordan; Andre Bennett; Tonya Edwards; Tremethia Jupiter	Scarface	4:24
11.	"Free"	Jordan; Dennis; Williams; Dean	Mike Dean; Mr. Lee	4:27
12.	"Thugg Niggaz" (featuring DMG and Dorasel)	Jordan; Dennis; Armstrong; Vaughn; Williams; Gordon Matthew Thomas Sumner	Mr. Lee	5:34
13.	"They Bitches"	Jordan; Dennis; Gilmour	Tone Capone	3:56
14.	"Big Faces" (featuring Yukmouth and Gorilla Click)	Jordan; Armstrong; Ellis; R. Brown; H. Cross; R. Ellison; Williams; Dean	Scarface; Mike Dean; Mr. Lee	4:34
15.	"Gangsta (Put Me Down)"	Jordan; Dennis; Dean; Bob James	Scarface; Mike Dean	4:20
16.	"Street Game"	Jordan; Dennis; C. Wright; Tyrone Wrice	Hurt-M-Badd	3:44
17.	"Retaliation" (featuring 007, K.B. and Madd Dogg)	Jordan; Andre Barnes; Kevin Brown; Dean	Scarface; Mike Dean	3:34
18.	"Gun in My Mouth" (featuring Outlawz)	Jordan; Beale; Cooper; Cox; Williams	Mr. Lee	4:19
Total length:				1:12:56

Sample credits

- Track 12 embodies portions of "The Bed's Too Big Without You" written by Sting.
- Track 15 embodies portions of "Look-Alike" written by Bob James.

== Personnel ==
- Brad "Scarface" Jordan – vocals, producer (tracks: 3, 10, 14, 15, 17)
- William "Willie D." Dennis – vocals
- Harold "DMG" Armstrong – vocals (tracks: 2, 3, 9, 12)
- Tyrin "Caine" Turner – vocals (track 2)
- Jerold "Yukmouth" Ellis – vocals (tracks: 2, 14)
- Winston "Tela" Rogers – vocals (track 6)
- Eric "Dorasel" Vaughn – vocals (tracks: 7, 12)
- Devin "The Dude" Copeland – vocals (track 8)
- Mutah "Napoleon" Beale – vocals (tracks: 9, 18)
- Rufus "Young Noble" Cooper – vocals (tracks: 9, 18)
- Malcolm "E.D.I. Mean" Greenidge – vocals (track 9)
- Katari "Kastro" Cox – vocals (tracks: 9, 18)
- J. "Gotti" Baker – vocals (track 9)
- Tonya Edwards – vocals (track 10)
- Tremethia Jupiter – vocals (track 10)
- Gorilla Click – vocals (track 14)
- Andre "007" Barnes – vocals (track 17)
- Kevin "KB" Brown – vocals (track 17)
- Madd Dogg – vocals (track 17)
- Leroy "Mr. Lee" Williams Jr. – producer (tracks: 2, 11, 12, 14, 18), engineering, mixing
- Mike Dean – producer (tracks: 3, 6–8, 11, 14, 15, 17), engineering, mixing, mastering
- Joseph "N.O. Joe" Johnson – producer (track 3)
- John "Swift" Catalon – producer (track 5)
- Anthony "Tone Capone" Gilmour – producer (tracks: 6, 7, 13)
- James "Jay Sinnusta" White – producer (track 9)
- Tyrone "Hurt-M-Badd" Wrice – producer (track 16)
- Micah Harrison – engineering
- James "J Prince" Smith – executive producer
- Pen & Pixel Graphics – photography, design, layout
- Tony Randle – production supervisor
- Anzel Jennings – production coordinator

== Charts ==
=== Weekly charts ===
Chart (1998)	Peak position
US Billboard 200	26
US Top R&B/Hip-Hop Albums (Billboard)	5

=== Year-end charts ===
Chart (1999)	Position
US Top R&B/Hip-Hop Albums (Billboard)	69
