= Too Much Trouble =

American hip hop group

- Also known as: TMT; The Baby Geto Boys
- Origin: Houston, Texas, U.S.
- Genres: Southern hip hop; gangsta rap
- Years active: 1992–1997
- Label: Rap-A-Lot Records
- Past members: Bad News Black; Drunk D a.k.a. Nickel Nut; Bar-None; Ghetto MC (deceased)

Too Much Trouble (often abbreviated to "TMT") is an American gangsta rap group from Houston, Texas. The group produced three albums before disbanding in 1997.

== Members ==
- Drunk D
- Bar-None (John Vanbibber)
- DJ Bad News Black (Tracy Howze)
- Ghetto MC / Lil Ghetto

== Discography ==
List of studio albums, with selected chart positions and information
Year	Title	Peak chart positions	
Year	Title	Top R&B/Hip-Hop Albums	Heatseekers Albums
1992	Bringing Hell On Earth: Label: Rap-A-Lot Records	54	16
1993	Player's Choice: Label: Rap-A-Lot Records	55	—
1997	Too Much Weight: Label: Rap-A-Lot Records, Triple Beam Records	75	—
