= The Geto Boys (album) =

Remix album by Geto Boys
- Released: September 21, 1990
- Genres: Hardcore hip hop; Southern hip hop
- Length: 54:56
- Label: Def American/Warner Bros.
- Producers: Rick Rubin (exec.); Clifford Blodget (exec.); DJ Ready Red; Doug King; John Bido; Johnny C.

Geto Boys chronology
Grip It! On That Other Level (1989)	The Geto Boys (1990)	We Can't Be Stopped (1991)

The Geto Boys is a remix album by American hip hop group Geto Boys, released on September 21, 1990, by Def American Recordings. The album features one song from the group's debut album Making Trouble (1988), ten from their previous album Grip It! On That Other Level (1989), and two new songs, all of which were re-recorded and remixed by producers Rick Rubin and Brendan O'Brien. Of the twelve songs from Grip It!, only "Seek and Destroy" and "No Sellout" were excluded from this album.

The album was originally scheduled for release in August 1990, but Geffen Records, then-distributor for Def American Recordings, refused to release it due to its graphic lyrical content, and pulled it from its schedule. After Geffen terminated its deal with Def American, the album was instead distributed by Warner Bros. Records in September 1990.

== Controversy and release ==
Due to the graphic nature of the album's lyrics, particularly in the songs "Mind of a Lunatic" and "Assassins", Def American's distributor Geffen Records, as well as its manufacturer Sony DADC, refused to have any part in the release. After Geffen removed the album from its August release schedule and terminated its manufacturing and distributing deal with Def American, Rick Rubin arranged a new deal with Warner Bros. Records, which agreed to distribute the album as intended, as well as all subsequent Def American releases, with product manufacturing by WEA Manufacturing. The album was then released on September 21, 1990, with marketing handled by Warner Bros. sister label Giant Records.

The song "Do It Like a G.O." was released as a single with a music video, but it did not chart.

== Packaging ==
The original Def American pressing features the following warning in addition to the standard Parental Advisory sticker:

Def American Recordings is opposed to censorship. Our manufacturer and distributor, however, do not condone or endorse the content of this recording, which they find violent, sexist, racist, and indecent.

Subsequent pressings on Rap-a-Lot and various distributors do not contain the secondary warning.

== Reception ==
Professional ratings
Review scores
Source	Rating
AllMusic	4/5 stars
Robert Christgau	B−
Entertainment Weekly	B−
Rolling Stone	3/5 stars
The Source	3.5/5 stars

In a 3.5-mike-out-of-5 review, The Source wrote positively of Rick Rubin's contribution to the album, writing, "The group's fuck-everybody attitude and simple straight-forward music is a perfect match for Rubin...." Andy Kellman of AllMusic also praised Rubin's contribution, writing, "The album is expertly sequenced, and some songs seem to have twice the impact of their original incarnations."

Robert Christgau, on the other hand, criticized the album, comparing it negatively to slasher films. Christgau ended the review, writing, "I'm impressed by [its] pungent beats and vernacular. I'm glad they put Reagan in bed with Noriega. I'm sorta touched when one of them thinks to thank the first girl to lick his asshole. I admire their enunciation on 'Fuck 'Em.' But fuck 'em." In another mixed review, Entertainment Weekly's Greg Sandow ridiculed the album's glorification of violence, writing, "The catalog starts to seem silly. Stealing from the poor? On their next album, the Geto Boys might just as well do a song about tearing wings off flies."

== Track listing ==
All tracks are written by Akshen, Li'l J, and Willie D.

No.	Title	Length
1.	"Fuck 'Em"	4:02
2.	"Size Ain't Shit"	3:41
3.	"Mind of a Lunatic"	5:10
4.	"Gangsta of Love"	5:24
5.	"Trigga-Happy Nigga"	3:47
6.	"Life in the Fast Lane"	3:27
7.	"Assassins"	5:08
8.	"Do It Like a G.O."	4:25
9.	"Read These Nikes"	3:37
10.	"Talkin' Loud, Ain't Sayin Nothin'"	3:35
11.	"Scarface"	4:54
12.	"Let a Ho Be a Ho"	3:42
13.	"City Under Siege"	4:29
Total length:		54:56

== Personnel ==
The following people contributed to The Geto Boys:

Geto Boys

- DJ Ready Red
- Akshen
- Bushwick Bill
- Willie D

Production

- Prince Johnny C – producer
- John Bido – producer
- Clifford Blodget – engineer, executive producer
- DJ Ready Red – producer
- Doug King – producer
- Sylvia Massy – engineer
- Brendan O'Brien – remixing
- Ready Red – producer
- Billy Roberts – photography
- Rick Rubin – production supervisor
- James H. Smith – executive producer
- Howie Weinberg – mastering

== Charts ==
Chart (1990)	Peak position
US Billboard 200	171
US Top R&B/Hip Hop Albums (Billboard)	67

== Sources ==
- Bogdanov, Vladimir; Woodstra, Chris; Erlewine, Stephen Thomas, eds. (2001). All Music Guide: the Definitive Guide to Popular Music (4th ed.). Backbeat Books. ISBN 978-0-87930-627-4.
