= Grip It! On That Other Level =

Studio album by Ghetto Boys
- Released: March 12, 1989
- Recorded: 1988–1989
- Genres: Southern hip hop; gangsta rap; horrorcore
- Length: 54:03
- Label: Rap-A-Lot
- Producers: DJ Ready Red; Doug King; James Smith; John Bido; Johnny C

Ghetto Boys chronology
Making Trouble (1988)	Grip It! On That Other Level (1989)	The Geto Boys (1990)

Alternative cover
- Reissue album cover

Professional ratings
Review scores
Source	Rating
AllMusic	3/5 stars
The Source	5/5 stars

Grip It! On That Other Level is the second studio album by the Houston, Texas based hip-hop group, the Ghetto Boys (later spelled Geto Boys), released on March 12, 1989, on Rap-A-Lot Records. Following the disappointing results of the group's first album, Rap-A-Lot CEO James Prince replaced two of the group members with Scarface (then known as Akshen) and Willie D, who joined original members Bushwick Bill and DJ Ready Red. Recording for the album began in 1988, and finished in early 1989. The majority of the album's tracks were produced by DJ Ready Red, and much of the album's lyrical content deals with violent and misogynistic topics, which would later be credited for pioneering the horrorcore hip hop subgenre.

Upon its 1989 release, Grip It! On That Other Level reached number 166 on the Billboard 200 chart, and number 19 on the Top R&B/Hip Hop Albums chart. The song "Do it Like a G.O." was the album's only single used for promotion. Grip It! was well received in the hip hop community, and was considered to be the group's breakout album, as it gave them national exposure and eventually sold 500,000 copies independently. A year after its release, super-producer Rick Rubin remixed 10 of its tracks for the 1990 remix album The Geto Boys. In 1998, The Source magazine included Grip It! On That Other Level on their 100 Best Albums list, and in 2002, they gave it the perfect five mic' rating.

== Background ==
In 1988, Rap-A-Lot Records founder James Prince decided to invest his full budget and attention towards the Ghetto Boys, as he saw them as the most promising music-act on his label. After the critical and commercial failure of the group's debut album Making Trouble, J. Prince felt that the Ghetto Boys needed to go in a different direction, and that their line-up needed to change. He opted to keep DJ Ready Red and their hype man Bushwick Bill, but dropped Sire Jukebox and Prince Johnny C, as he saw the latter two as copying several artists from New York City.

Willie D, who had signed to Rap-A-Lot as a solo artist in 1988, was added to the group at James Prince's request as a favor. Willie would later reveal that he was reluctant at first to join the fold, as he wanted to make a solo album. However, his debut LP entitled Controversy, would be released several months after Grip It! On That Other Level.

After hearing about a local rapper named Akshen who was gaining notoriety in the Houston hip hop community, J. Prince and his brother set up an audition at DJ Ready Red's house, with Akshen, or James' brother getting the final spot as a member of the Geto Boys. As the two began to compete over DJ Ready Red's beats, James Prince was impressed by Akshen's lyrical abilities, as well as his serious subject matter, which was un-common in hip hop at that time. Akshen, who would later change his stage name to Scarface, ended up getting the spot as the fourth and final member of the Geto Boys.

Recording for Grip It! On That Other Level began in 1988, and reached completion in early 1989. The album was well received in the Hip hop community, and gave the group exposure in the east coast and west coast, where southern hip hop was previously ignored. James Prince later revealed that if Grip It! On That Other Level wasn't a success, he was going to shut down Rap-A-Lot Records, and quit the music industry.

== Reception ==
Grip It! On That Other Level has received mostly favorable reviews. In 1990, The Source gave it a four out of five rating, and when comparing it to the group's remix album The Geto Boys, they favored Grip It!, stating that some of the changes on the remix album "aren't for the better". However, in his review for AllMusic, Andy Kellman called the remix version an "improvement".

In 1998, The Source magazine included Grip It! On That Other Level on their 100 Best Albums list, and in 2002, they gave it the perfect five out of five mic rating. In the 2004 edition of The Rolling Stone Album Guide, Christian Hoard stated that with Grip It!, the Geto Boys "filled a void that the mainstream didn't know they had yet; shock-rap." He also listed "Mind of a Lunatic" and "Trigga Happy Nigga" as "galling tracks".

== Track listing ==
No.	Title	Writer(s)	Producer(s)	Length
1.	"Do It Like a G.O."	Brad Jordan; William Dennis; Richard Shaw; Collins Leysath	DJ Ready Red	4:34
2.	"Gangster of Love"	Brad Jordan; William Dennis; Johnathan C.	Prince Johnny C	5:41
3.	"Talkin' Loud Ain't Saying Nothin"	Brad Jordan; William Dennis; Richard Shaw; Collins Leysath	DJ Ready Red	5:07
4.	"Read These Nikes"	William Dennis; Collins Leysath	DJ Ready Red	3:40
5.	"Size Ain't Shit"	Brad Jordan; Richard Shaw; Collins Leysath	DJ Ready Red	3:39
6.	"Seek and Destroy"	Brad Jordan; John Bido; Doug King	John Bido; Doug King	3:30
7.	"No Sell Out"	William Dennis; Collins Leysath	DJ Ready Red	4:38
8.	"Let a Ho Be a Ho"	William Dennis; Collins Leysath	DJ Ready Red	4:31
9.	"Scarface"	Brad Jordan; John Bido	John Bido	5:05
10.	"Life in the Fast Lane"	Brad Jordan; Collins Leysath	DJ Ready Red	3:15
11.	"Trigga Happy Nigga"	Brad Jordan; William Dennis; Richard Shaw; Collins Leysath; John Bido	DJ Ready Red; John Bido	4:46
12.	"Mind of a Lunatic"	Brad Jordan; William Dennis; Richard Shaw; Doug King	Doug King	5:24

Sample credits

- "Do It Like a G.O." contains a sample of "Superfly" by Curtis Mayfield, "Scorpio" by Dennis Coffey, and "Apache" from the Incredible Bongo Band.
- "Gangster of Love" contains a sample of "The Joker" by Steve Miller Band.
- "Talkin Loud Ain't Saying Nothin" contains a sample of "Skin Tight" by Ohio Players and "Talkin' Loud & Sayin' Nothing" by James Brown.
- "No Sell Out" contains a sample of "Rocket in the Pocket" by Cerrone.
- "Let a Ho Be a Ho" contains a sample of "Money" by Pink Floyd.
- "Scarface" contains a sample of "Blues and Pants" by James Brown, and "Gimme What You Got" by Pomplamoose.
- "Life in the Fast Lane" contains a sample of "The Big Bang Theory" by Parliament.
- "Mind of a Lunatic" contains a sample of "Givin' Up Food for Funk" by the J.B.'s, written by James Brown and Fred Wesley, and samples from "Funky Drummer (Bonus Beat Reprise)" by James Brown.

== Personnel ==
The Ghetto Boys

- Brad "Akshen" Jordan – performer (later known as Scarface)
- William "Willie D" Dennis – performer
- Richard "Bushwick Bill" Shaw – performer

Production

- Collins "DJ Ready Red" Leysath – producer
- John Bido – producer
- Doug King – producer
- Prince Johnny C – producer
- J. Smith – producer
- James Prince – executive producer
- Clifford Blodget – engineer, executive producer
- Billy Roberts – photography

== Charts ==
Chart (1989)	Peak position
US Billboard 200	166
US Top R&B/Hip Hop Albums	19
