= The Foundation (Geto Boys album) =

Studio album by Geto Boys
- Released: January 25, 2005
- Recorded: 2003–2004
- Studios: Noddfactor Studios (Houston, TX); Dean's List House of Hits (Houston, TX); M.A.D.D. Studios (Houston, TX); The Garage (Houston, TX)
- Genre: Hip-hop
- Length: 56:04
- Labels: J. Prince; Rap-A-Lot 4 Life; Asylum
- Producers: Cory Mo; Mike Dean; Mr. Mixx; Scarface; Tone Capone; Willie D

Geto Boys chronology
Da Good da Bad & da Ugly (1998)	The Foundation (2005)

Singles from The Foundation
- 1. "I Tried" Released: 2004; 2. "G-Code" Released: 2005; 3. "Yes, Yes, Y'All" Released: March 15, 2005

Professional ratings
Review scores
Source	Rating
AllMusic	2.5/5 stars
HipHopDX	4/5
RapReviews	8/10
The Austin Chronicle	2/5 stars
USA Today	3/4 stars

The Foundation is the seventh and final studio album by American hip-hop group Geto Boys. It was released on January 25, 2005, through Rap-A-Lot 4 Life. Recording sessions took place at Noddfactor Studios, Dean's List House of Hits, M.A.D.D. Studios and The Garage in Houston. Production was handled by Tone Capone, Mike Dean, Cory Mo, Mr. Mixx, and members Scarface and Willie D, with J. Prince serving as executive producer. It features guest appearances from Z-Ro and Willy Hen.

The album peaked at number 19 on the Billboard 200, number 3 on the Top R&B/Hip-Hop Albums and number 2 on the Top Rap Albums charts in the United States. It was supported with three singles: "I Tried", "G-Code" and "Yes, Yes, Y'All", but none of them went on charted. The instrumental to "G-Code" was used in a Chrysler 300 commercial featuring Ndamukong Suh, while "Yes, Yes, Y'All" was used in video games Fight Night Round 2 and 25 to Life.

== Track listing ==
No.	Title	Writer(s)	Producer(s)	Length
1.	"Intro"	James Smith; Michael Dean	Mike Dean	1:00
2.	"Declaration of War"	Brad Jordan; William Dennis; Anthony Gilmour; M. Dean	Tone Capone; Mike Dean	3:48
3.	"Yes, Yes, Y'all"	Jordan; Dennis	Scarface	3:45
4.	"We Boogie"	Jordan; Dennis	Scarface	4:20
5.	"When It Get's Gangsta" (featuring Z-Ro)	Jordan; Dennis; Joseph McVey; Cory Moore	Cory Mo	4:04
6.	"I Tried"	Jordan; Dennis; Gilmour; Leonard Caston Jr.; Theresa G. McFaddin	Tone Capone	4:05
7.	"1, 2, the 3" (featuring Willy Hen)	Jordan; Dennis; Willie Henderson; Gilmour; James Brown; Charles Sherrell	Tone Capone	3:51
8.	"G Code"	Jordan	Scarface	4:12
9.	"What?"	Jordan; Dennis	Scarface	4:02
10.	"Leanin' on You"	Jordan; Dennis; David Hobbs; James Dean; William L. Wooten III	Mr. Mixx	4:12
11.	"Nothin' to Show"	Dennis; Moore	Cory Mo; Willie D.	5:00
12.	"Real Nigga Shit"	Jordan; Dennis	Scarface	3:58
13.	"The Secret"	Jordan; Dennis; Gilmour	Tone Capone	4:25
14.	"Dirty Bitch"	Dennis; M. Dean	Mike Dean	4:20
15.	"Outro"	Smith; M. Dean	Mike Dean	1:02
Total length:				56:04

Sample credits

- Track 6 contains a portion of "Each Day I Cry a Little" performed by Eddie Kendricks.
- Track 7 contains a portion of "Hang Out and Hustle" performed by Sweet Charles.
- Track 10 contains a portion of "If You Move I'll Fall" performed by the Soul Children.

== Personnel ==
- Brad "Scarface" Jordan – vocals, producer (tracks: 3, 4, 8, 9, 12)
- William "Willie D." Dennis – vocals, producer (track 11)
- Richard "Bushwick Bill" Shaw – vocals
- Joseph "Z-Ro" McVey – vocals (track 5)
- Willie "Willy Hen" Henderson – vocals (track 7)
- Mike Dean – producer (tracks: 1, 2, 14, 15), mixing, mastering
- Anthony "Tone Capone" Gilmour – producer (tracks: 2, 6, 7, 13)
- Cory Moore – producer (tracks: 5, 11)
- David "Mr. Mixx" Hobbs – producer (track 10)
- James "J. Prince" Smith – executive producer
- Stacey Wade – design, layout
- Anzel "Int'l Red" Jennings – A&R
- Tony "Big Chief" Randle – A&R

== Charts ==
=== Weekly charts ===
Chart (2005)	Peak position
US Billboard 200	19
US Top R&B/Hip-Hop Albums (Billboard)	3
US Top Rap Albums (Billboard)	2

=== Year-end charts ===
Chart (2005)	Position
US Top R&B/Hip-Hop Albums (Billboard)	77
