= We Can't Be Stopped =

1991 studio album by Geto Boys

Studio album by Geto Boys
- Released: July 9, 1991
- Recorded: 1990–1991
- Genres: Southern hip-hop; Hip-hop
- Length: 51:45
- Labels: Rap-A-Lot; Priority
- Producers: Bushwick Bill; James Smith; John Bido; Johnny C; Roland; Scarface; Simon; Willie D

Geto Boys chronology
The Geto Boys (1990)	We Can't Be Stopped (1991)	Uncut Dope (1992)

Singles from We Can't Be Stopped
- 1. "Mind Playing Tricks on Me" Released: July 1, 1991

We Can't Be Stopped is the third studio album by Geto Boys, released on July 9, 1991. It was among their most successful records in terms of units sold. The album is analyzed track-by-track by Geto Boys in Brian Coleman's book Check the Technique. We Can't Be Stopped was certified Platinum in early 1992.

== Recording ==
We Can't Be Stopped took only a few weeks to record. During the recording of the album, DJ Ready Red, one of the original Geto Boys members, left the group for personal reasons.

In We Can't Be Stopped, each member of the group has three solo tracks. Three tracks have all three members on the rapping roster, including a short verse from DJ Ready Red on the title track.

== Album cover ==
The album cover is a graphic picture of member Bushwick Bill in the hospital. Bill was shot in the eye as he and his girlfriend tussled over a gun. Bushwick Bill wanted her to kill him and during the altercation he was shot as both hands were on the gun. The other two Geto Boys members and the group's management team took Bill out of the hospital room in order to take the picture, removing his eyepatch and intravenous drip in the process. Bill later expressed regret over the album cover, saying, "It still hurts me to look at that cover because that was a personal thing I went through ... I still feel the pain from the fact I've got a bullet in my brain ... I think it was pretty wrong to do it, even though I went along with the program at first."

== Reception ==
Professional ratings
Review scores
Source	Rating
AllMusic	4.5/5 stars
Robert Christgau	(choice cut)
The Encyclopedia of Popular Music	3/5 stars
Entertainment Weekly	B
RapReviews	9/10
Rolling Stone	2/5 stars
The Rolling Stone Album Guide	3/5 stars

Fred Thomas from AllMusic called the album "[the group's] most visceral work, rising to platinum success against the odds and inspiring innovation in the genre with its powerful and distinctively Southern perspective on what rap could be." James Bernard of Entertainment Weekly gave the album a "B", saying that much of the "album stings, and their raw honesty has driven it onto the Billboard pop Top 40..."

The track "Mind Playing Tricks on Me" has been singled out for praise. Pitchfork Media ranked the song No. 45 on its Top 200 Tracks of the 1990s list, with reviewer Tom Breihan writing "This track established the South as a serious force in the music, proving that these Texans could do dark better than anyone on either coast." XXL ranked the song No. 14 on its list of the 250 Greatest Hip-Hop Songs from 1990 to 1999. The Source gave the track its "Best Song" award in 1991. Robert Christgau gave the album a choice cut rating, only liking "Mind Playing Tricks on Me".

== Track listing ==
No.	Title	Length
1.	"Rebel Rap Family"	1:22
2.	"We Can't Be Stopped"	3:34
3.	"Homie Don't Play That"	3:48
4.	"Another Nigger in the Morgue"	3:14
5.	"Chuckie"	3:48
6.	"Mind Playing Tricks on Me"	5:11
7.	"I'm Not a Gentleman"	4:01
8.	"Gota Let Your Nuts Hang"	4:11
9.	"Fuck a War"	4:16
10.	"Ain't with Being Broke"	3:47
11.	"Quickie"	3:08
12.	"Punk-Bitch Game"	2:16
13.	"The Other Level"	6:01
14.	"Trophy"	3:08

== Sample credits ==
The following samples were used on We Can't Be Stopped:

"Rebel Rap Family"
- "Scarface Theme" by Giorgio Moroder

"Homie Don't Play That"
- "(Not Just) Knee Deep" by Funkadelic
- "More Bounce to the Ounce" by Zapp & Roger
- "West Coast Poplock" by Ronnie Hudson
- "Atomic Dog" by George Clinton
- "Pumpin' It Up" by P-Funk Allstars
- "So Ruff, So Tuff" by Roger Troutman

"Mind Playing Tricks on Me"
- "Hung Up on My Baby" by Isaac Hayes
- "The Jam" by Graham Central Station

"I'm Not a Gentleman"
- "I Heard That!!" by Quincy Jones
- "You'll Like It Too" by Funkadelic

"Gota Let Your Nuts Hang"
- "Corey Died on the Battlefield" by the Wild Magnolias

"Fuck a War"
- "Devil with the Bust" by Sound Experience

"Ain't with Being Broke"
- "Damn Right I Am Somebody" by Fred Wesley & the J.B.'s

"Quickie"
- "Impeach the President" by the Honey Drippers
- "Oh Honey" by the Delegation

"Punk-Bitch Game"
- "Don't Call Me Nigger, Whitey" by Sly and the Family Stone

"The Other Level"
- "God Make Me Funky" by the Headhunters and the Pointer Sisters
- "Love Hangover" by Diana Ross
- "Kool Is Back" by Funk Inc.

"Trophy"
- "Terminator X to the Edge of Panic" by Public Enemy
- "Catch a Groove" by Juice
- "Soul Makossa" by Manu Dibango
- "I Gotcha" by Joe Tex

== Charts ==
=== Weekly charts ===
Chart (1991)	Peak position
US Billboard 200	24
US Top R&B/Hip-Hop Albums (Billboard)	5

Chart (2026)	Peak position
UK Independent Albums (Official Charts)	46

=== Year-end charts ===
Chart (1991)	Position
US Billboard 200	87
US Top R&B/Hip-Hop Albums (Billboard)	47
Chart (1992)	Position
US Top R&B/Hip-Hop Albums (Billboard)	69

=== Singles ===
Year	Song	Chart positions			
Year	Song	Hot 100	Hot R&B/ Hip-Hop	Hot Rap	Rhythmic Top 40
1991	"Mind Playing Tricks on Me"	23	10	1	32

== Certifications ==
Region	Certification	Certified units/sales
United States (RIAA)	Platinum	1,000,000^{^}
^{^} Shipments figures based on certification alone.
