= N.O. Joe =

American drummer

- Birth name: Joseph Johnson
- Also known as: Joe Kool
- Born: March 31, 1975 (age 50)
- Origin: New Orleans, Louisiana, U.S.
- Genres: Hip hop, R&B, Pop, Electro, rock
- Occupation(s): Record producer, film/tv scoring, songwriter/arranger, singer, musician, rapper
- Instrument(s): Guitar, bass guitar, mandolin, keyboards, rapper, vocals, beatboxing, vocoder, drums/percussions
- Years active: 1993–present
- Labels: Gumbo Funk Productions

Joseph Johnson (born March 31, 1975), known by his stage name N.O. Joe, is an American musician, hip hop record producer and songwriter. N.O. Joe was a pioneer of the Southern Hip Hop sound during the 1990s. He operates a production company named Gumbo Funk, which is also a name given to his melange of musical styles

== History ==
Johnson was born and raised in New Orleans While in high school in New Orleans, he began providing beats to local performers in Jackson Square. He was later encouraged to move to New York, where he began an affiliation with Universal Music Group as a producer.

Then known as Joe Kool, Johnson collaborated with Devante Swing, and the production group Da Bassment with that he contributed to Jodeci's first album, Forever My Lady. Johnson went on to work with Brian McKnight, R&B artist Joe and D'Angelo before moving into the rap genre.

== Southern hip-hop contributions ==
N.O. Joe contributed to the following albums (All album contributions not listed):

- Scarface, The Diary
- Scarface, The Untouchable
- Scarface, The Last of a Dying Breed
- Geto Boys, The Resurrection
- UGK, Ridin' Dirty
- UGK, Underground Kingz and individual songs from various UGK albums: "Hi Life", "Murder", "Diamonds and Wood"
- Odd Squad, Fadanuf Fa Erybody!!

== Artist roster ==
N.O. Joe has also contributed as producer to various labels such as Universal Music Group (1990–2003), and Rap-A-Lot as an independent production entity. N.O. Joe has worked on several platinum songs and albums, including a number 1 single "Pushin Weight", to Ice Cube's album War & Peace Vol. 1, LL Cool J's Grammy-nominated The DEFinition and has worked with:

- AZ
  - In 1995, AZ's album Do or Die peaked on the Billboard as the No. 1 R&B/Hip-Hop Album with chart topping hits such as the title track, produced by N.O. Joe, "Doe or Die" which reached the top twenties on the Billboard chart.
- Bahamadia
  - "I Confess" and "Biggest Part of Me"
- Brian Mcknight
  - In 1992, N.O. Joe teamed up with Brian McKnight to produce "Goodbye My Love" which was his first album release. The entire album went platinum and the single produced by N.O. Joe peaked on the Billboard chart in the Top 50.
- Big Mike
- D'Angelo
  - In 1995, N.O. Joe worked with D'Angelo on the UK-released version of "Cruisin".
- De La Soul
- Devin the Dude
- Ice Cube
- Ganksta N-I-P
- Geto Boys
- Jay-Z
- Joe
- Lil Wayne
- LL Cool J
- Luniz
- Master P
- Rick Ross
- Scarface
- T.I.
- UGK
- Travis Scott
- 2 Chainz
- Spuf don

=== Albums featuring N.O. Joe ===
Album information
Somethin' Serious
- Artist Name: Big Mike
- Released: 1994
- Production Credits: "Entire Album except ("Peter Man" and "On the one") N.O.Joe also was the featured singer on the chorus of "Player Player"
- Billboard 200: No. 40
- R&B/Hip-Hop: No. 4
- RIAA Certified: Gold
The Resurrection
- Artist Name: Geto Boys
- Released: April 2, 1996
- Production Credits: "Entire Album"
- Billboard 200:
- R&B/Hip-Hop:
- RIAA Certified: Gold
Till Death Do Us Part
- Artist Name: Geto Boys
- Released: March 19, 1993
- Production Credits: "Entire Album"
- Billboard 200: No. 28
- R&B/Hip-Hop: No. 1
- RIAA Certified: Gold
The Diary
- Artist Name: Scarface
- Released: October 18, 1994
- Production Credits: Entire Album
- Billboard 200: No. 2
- R&B/Hip-Hop: No. 2
- RIAA Certified: Platinum
Dirty Money
- Artist Name: UGK
- Released: November 13, 2001
- Production Credits: "Tracks 1–9 and 12 "
- Billboard 200: No. 15
- R&B/Hip-Hop: No. 2
- Singles: "One Day"
- RIAA Certified: Gold
Ridin Dirty
- Artist Name: UGK
- Released: July 29, 1996
- Production Credits: "Entire Album"
- Billboard 200: No. 15
- R&B/Hip-Hop: No. 2
- Singles: "One Day"
- RIAA Certified: Gold
Doe or Die
- Artist Name: AZ
- Released: October 10, 1995
- Production Credits: "Doe or Die"
- Billboard 200: No. 15
- R&B/Hip-Hop: No. 1
- Singles: "Doe or Die"
The Dude
- Artist Name: Devin the Dude
- Released: June 16, 1998
- Production Credits: "Do What You Wanna Do", "I Can't Quit"
- Billboard 200: No. 177
- R&B/Hip-Hop: No. 27
War & Peace Vol. 1
- RIAA Certified: PLATINUM
- Artist Name: Ice Cube
- Released: 1998
- Production Credits: "Pushin Weight"
- Billboard 200: No. 26
- R&B/Hip-Hop: No. 12
- Hot Rap Singles: No. 1
- Singles: "Pushin Weight"*RIAA Certified: Gold
The Last of a Dying Breed
- Artist Name: Scarface
- Released: October 3, 2000
- Production Credits: Entire Album
- Billboard 200: No. 7
- R&B/Hip-Hop: No. 2
- RIAA Certified: Gold
Just Tryin' ta Live
- Artist Name: Devin the Dude
- Released: January 29, 2002
- Production Credits: "Fa Sho"
- Billboard 200: No. 61
- R&B/Hip-Hop: No. 11
The DEFinition
- Artist Name: LL Cool J
- Released: August 31, 2004
- Production Credits: "Move Somethin" "Shake it Baby"
- Billboard 200: No. 4
- R&B/Hip-Hop: No. 3
- RIAA Certified: Gold
Operation Stackola
- Artist Name: THE LUNIZ
- Released: July 4, 1995
- Production Credits: "Yellow Brick Road" "I Got Five On It" (REMIX)" "Pimps Players Hustlers"
- Billboard 200: No. 1
- R&B/Hip-Hop: No. 1
- RIAA Certified: Platinum

== Soundtracks ==
N.O. Joe's music has also been featured on the following soundtracks:

- Jason's Lyric,
- Friday
- Office Space
- Tales from the Hood
- Johnson Family Vacation
- Original Gangstas

Soundtrack Information
I Dream of Jesus
- Television Show: Family Guy
- Released: October 5, 2008
- Production Credits: Scoring Segments for the Episode (Office Space)
- Nominations: Episode Nominated for "Outstanding Comedy Series"
- Episode viewed by 8.5 million viewers and nominated for an Emmy Award
