= Making Trouble =

Studio album by Ghetto Boys
- Released: 1988
- Recorded: 1987
- Genre: Horrorcore; hardcore hip hop; Southern hip hop
- Label: Rap-A-Lot
- Producer: Ghetto Boys; Cliff Blodget; Karl Stephenson

Ghetto Boys chronology
Making Trouble (1988)	Grip It! On That Other Level (1989)

Professional ratings
Review scores
Source	Rating
AllMusic	1.5/5 stars
RapReviews	2.5/10
The Rolling Stone Album Guide	2/5 stars

Making Trouble is the debut studio album by the American hip-hop group the Ghetto Boys. The group originally consisted of Bushwick Bill, DJ Ready Red, Sire Jukebox and Prince Johnny C. Following the release of Making Trouble, Rap-A-Lot Records dropped Sire Jukebox and Johnny C from the group, and added Scarface and Willie D.

Making Trouble received little attention, negative reviews, and is often forgotten in the midst of the group's later successful, acclaimed and controversial albums.

== Style and influence ==
The group used a style of rap similar to Run-DMC at this time as opposed to the more hardcore rap style that Scarface and Willie D provided in later albums. Insane Clown Posse's Violent J, who was influenced by the Geto Boys, regards the song "Assassins" as the first horrorcore song ever recorded. It was covered by Insane Clown Posse on their 1999 album The Amazing Jeckel Brothers.

== Tracklist ==
#	Title	Time(s)
1	"Making Trouble"	5:19
2	"Snitches"	2:43
3	"Balls and My Word"	3:50
4	"Assassins"	5:45
5	"Why Do We Live This Way"	6:53
6	"I Run This"	4:20
7	"No Curfew"	3:36
8	"One Time Freestyle"	3:26
9	"Geto Boys Will Rock You"	3:45
10	"You Ain't Nothin'"	2:46
11	"The Problem"	2:58

== Personnel ==
Ghetto Boys

- Prince Johnny C. – vocals, production
- The Sire Jukebox – vocals, production
- DJ Ready Red – vocals, turntables, production

Additional personnel

- Karl Stephenson – production, sampling
- Cliff Blodget – production
