= Rap-A-Lot Records =

Southern hip-hop record label

- Parent company: Sony Music Entertainment
- Founded: 1986; 40 years ago
- Founder: James Prince, Cliff Blodget
- Distributor: RED Distribution
- Genre: Southern hip-hop
- Country of origin: United States
- Location: Houston, Texas

Rap-A-Lot is a hip-hop record label co-founded by record executives James Prince and Cliff Blodget in 1986. Smoke-a-Lot Records is a subsidiary.

Rap-A-Lot was first distributed by A&M Records with the release of Raheem's 1988 debut The Vigilante. The label was distributed through the 1990s by EMI's Priority Records (1991–1994), Noo Trybe Records (1994–1998), and Virgin Records (1998–2002). In the 2000s, it was distributed by Asylum Records and then Fontana Distribution.

On August 22, 2013, Rap-A-Lot announced a distribution deal with RED Distribution.

== History ==
The label was formed filling in a gap for recognition and promotion of southern talent especially in the Houston area. This was in part to label executives in other parts of the country passing on southern hip-hop acts. During this period, DJ's from the east coast had been exploiting the region and pushing music from their domestic territories instead.

James Prince was working as a bank teller in 1985 in the fault department, then getting laid off at the age of 20. The initial goal prior to the label was to keep his younger stepbrother known as the rapper Sir Rap-A-Lot out of street life, as well as friends Raheem and Jukebox from skipping school. They would meet on the porch of his grandmothers house to perform and practice. After purchasing an abandoned building, he turned the property into on a used car dealership, known as Smith Auto Sales on the west side of Houston. At first he sold bucket cars then moving on to exotic cars which athletes would come and purchase. The same rundown 2 storey building that Prince owned, was where the artists then moved on to record into during 1986.

Prince co-founded Rap-A-Lot Records with Cliff Blodget, a Seattleite, in 1987. Bloget was a computer science major, who was an electrical engineer by trade and acted as the label's in-house engineer and producer alongside fellow producer Carl Stephenson. Prince used his last bit of funds to invest into the label. He was inspired by Russell Simmons and the label he founded Def Jam Recordings. He moved the company in 1988 to New York City with Blodget. Around this time Lyor Cohen would show Prince check books of Def Jam artists LL Cool J and Whodini which showed him the potential revenue to be made in the music industry enlightening him to continue his vision with the Geto Boys moving the whole label back to Houston.

The first group he formed in the label was the Geto Boys. The first incarnation was dancer Bushwick Bill, DJ Ready Red, Sire Jukebox and Prince Johnny C. Prince moved on and then found new members Willie D through the recommendation of his barber, and Scarface in the parking lot of a club he owned playing demos to a DJ who worked there. Bushwick was then made as a rapper. Prince's brother was a member but then was replaced at his discretion with Scarface. This was confirmed from a freestyle battle against each other where Scarface outperformed Sir Rap-A-Lot, with the younger brother then agreeing that was the better direction for the group also. Using local radio stations like KTSU to spread the reach of the label's music, his first deal came in 1989 via Rick Rubin working with the Geto Boys on their 2nd album Grip It! On That Other Level.

Geffen Records who had been working with Rubin pulled the project a week before its release to the lyrical nature of the album, despite claims of racism and hypocrisy made by the Geto Boys and the fact that independently the album already had sold over 500,000 copies. The controversy lead to Rubin splitting from Geffen and signing with Warner Records with the album being pushed there instead, it tripled the total sales of the project.

Prior to the success of "Ice Ice Baby", Prince wanted to sign rapper Vanilla Ice after seeing him perform in 1990 at The Summit. He did not follow through as a result of his business partner Blodget feeling that the artist lacked talent.

Prince signed a deal with Priority Records in 1991 for distribution, releasing the Geto Boys third album We Can't Be Stopped. By the mid-1990s co-founder Blodget had parted ways from Rap-A-Lot. In 1995 Prince signed the next distribution deal with Noo Trybe Records and Virgin Records.

In March 1998, Rap-A-Lot released Scarface's fifth studio album, My Homies. The album debuted and peaked in the top 5 on the Billboard 200 and was certified platinum by the RIAA for sales of over a million copies.

During the 1990s, two DEA agents placed a probe on Prince and his label, believing the label was a front for a major trafficking network. At this time a concept for a music distribution label that would have acted dually as a union for recording artists was being planned between Prince, Suge Knight, and Irv Gotti which was eventually cancelled. The two agents were later convicted of corrupt conduct.

== Notable artists ==
=== Rap-A-Lot 4 Life (J Prince Sr) ===
- Bun B
- Pimp C (deceased)
- Geto Boys
- Do or Die
- Scarface
- Willie D
- Z-Ro
- Mike Dean
- Trae tha Truth
- Devin The Dude
- Yukmouth
- Outlawz
- Tela

=== Rap-A-Lot YEMG (Jas Prince) ===
- YK Osiris
- Finesse2tymes

=== Rap-A-Lot New Wave (Baby Jay Prince) ===
- Almighty Jay
- YBN Nahmir

== Major releases ==
=== 1980s ===
1987

- Ghetto Boys - Car Freak
- Ghetto Boys - You Ain't Nothing / I Run This

1988

- Raheem - The Vigilante
- Ghetto Boys - Making Trouble
- Royal Flush - Uh Oh!
- Def IV - Nice And Hard

1989

- Geto Boys - Grip It! On That Other Level
- Willie D - Controversy

=== 1990s ===
1990

- Choice - The Big Payback
- Geto Boys - The Geto Boys

1991

- O.G. Style - I Know How to Play 'Em
- Big Mike & Mr. 3-2 - Convicts
- Geto Boys - We Can't Be Stopped
- Scarface - Mr. Scarface Is Back

1992

- The Terrorists - Terror Strikes; Always Bizness, Never Personal
- Too Much Trouble - Bringing Hell on Earth
- Ganksta N-I-P -The South Park Psycho
- Choice - Stick-N-Moove
- Big Mello - Bone Hard Zaggin'
- Raheem - The Invincible
- Prince Johnny C - It's Been A Long Rhyme Coming
- Bushwick Bill - Little Big Man
- Willie D - I'm Goin' Out Lika Soldier
- Geto Boys - Uncut Dope: Geto Boys' Best
- Seagram - The Dark Roads

1993

- Geto Boys - Till Death Do Us Part
- 5th Ward Boyz - Ghetto Dope
- Ganksta N-I-P - Psychic Thoughts
- Too Much Trouble - Player's Choice
- Scarface - The World Is Yours
- DMG - Rigormortiz
- 2 Low - Funky Lil Brotha

1994

- 5th Ward Boyz - Gangsta Funk
- Odd Squad - Fadanuf Fa Erybody!!
- Trinity Garden Cartel - Don't Blame It on da Music
- Blac Monks - Secrets of the Hidden Temple
- Seagram - Reality Check
- Big Mello - Wegonefunkwichamind
- Big Mike - Somethin' Serious
- Scarface - The Diary

1995

- CJ Mac - True Game
- 5th Ward Juvenilez - Deadly Groundz
- Bushwick Bill - Phantom of the Rapra
- Poppa LQ - Your Entertainment, My Reality
- Menace Clan - Da Hood
- 5th Ward Boyz - Rated G

1996

- Mr. 3-2 - The Wicked Buddah Baby
- The Almighty RSO - Doomsday: Forever RSO
- Geto Boys - The Resurrection
- Do or Die - Picture This
- Facemob - The Other Side of the Law
- Ganksta N-I-P - Psychotic Genius
- Various artists - 10th Anniversary

1997

- Scarface - The Untouchable
- Big Mike - Still Serious
- Ghetto Twiinz - In That Water
- Seagram - Souls on Ice
- Too Much Trouble - Too Much Weight
- 5th Ward Boyz - Usual Suspects

1998

- Scarface - My Homies
- Devin the Dude - The Dude
- Do or Die - Headz or Tailz
- Johnny P - The Next
- Geto Boys - Da Good Da Bad & Da Ugly
- Ghetto Twiinz - No Pain No Gain
- Blac Monks - No Mercy
- Tela - Now or Never
- Ganksta N-I-P - Interview with a Killa
- Big Mike - Hard to Hit

1999

- Yukmouth - Thugged Out: The Albulation
- 5th Ward Boyz - Keep It Poppin'
- J Prince Presents R.N.D.S.

=== 2000s ===
2000

- Scarface - The Last of a Dying Breed
- Do or Die - Victory
- Tela - The World Ain't Enuff
- Willie D - Loved by Few, Hated by Many

2001

- Yukmouth - Thug Lord: The New Testament
- Ghetto Twiinz - Got It on My Mind
- Snypaz - Livin' in the Scope
- Dorasel - Unleash The Beast

2002

- Devin the Dude - Just Tryin' ta Live
- Outlawz - Neva Surrenda
- Hussein Fatal - Fatal
- Luniz - Silver & Black
- Big Syke - Big Syke
- Do or Die - Back 2 the Game
- Tela - Double Dose
- Scarface - Greatest Hits
- Yukmouth - United Ghettos of America
- Geto Boys - Greatest Hits
- Facemob - Silence
- Snypaz - Snypaz

2003

- Scarface - Balls & My Word
- Yukmouth - Godzilla
- Slim Thug & Lil' Keke - The Big Unit
- DMG - Black Roulette
- Do or Die - Pimpin' Ain't Dead
- Dirty - Love Us or Hate Us
- Criminal Manne - Neighborhood Dope Manne
- Do or Die - Greatest Hits

2004

- Devin the Dude - To Tha X-Treme
- Thug Lordz - In Thugz We Trust
- Z-Ro - The Life of Joseph W. McVey
- Various artists - The Day After Hell Broke Loose
- UTP - The Beginning of the End
- 5th Ward Boyz - Greatest Hits
- Yukmouth - United Ghettos of America Vol. 2
- UTP - Nolia Clap

2005

- Lil' Flip & Z-Ro - Kings of the South
- Geto Boys - The Foundation
- Z-Ro - Let the Truth Be Told
- Pimp C - Sweet James Jones Stories
- Bun B - Trill
- Dirty - Hood Stories

2006

- Belo Zero - The Truth
- Do or Die - Get That Paper
- Z-Ro - I'm Still Livin'
- Pimp C - Pimpalation
- Scarface - My Homies Part 2
- Trae - Restless
- Partners-N-Crime - Club Bangaz

2007

- Trae - Life Goes On
- Devin the Dude - Waitin' to Inhale
- Z-Ro - Power
- Scarface - Made
- Dirty - The Art of Storytelling
- UTP - Back Like We Left Something

2008

- Yukmouth - Million Dollar Mouthpiece
- Scarface - The Best of Scarface
- Devin the Dude - Greatest Hits
- Yukmouth - Greatest Hits
- Bun B - II Trill
- Pimp C - Greatest Hits
- Geto Boys - Best of the Geto Boys
- ABN - It Is What It Is
- Z-Ro - Crack
- Devin the Dude - Hi Life
- Trae - The Beginning
- Scarface - Emeritus

2009

- Z-Ro - Greatest Hits
- Scarface - Greatest Features
- Damm D - Never Forget Loyalty (N.F.L.)
- Z-Ro - Cocaine

=== 2010s ===
2010

- Z-Ro - Heroin
- Bun B - Trill O.G.
- Pimp C - The Naked Soul Of Sweet Jones

2011

- Pimp C - Still Pimping
- Z-Ro - Meth

2012

- Z-Ro - Angel Dust
- Juvenile - Rejuvenation

2013

- Bun B - Trill OG: The Epilogue

2014

- Juvenile - The Fundamentals

2026

- JB The Artist - The newest signee is this kid, real name James Bryson Sifers. He is from Waco, TX.
