= Geto Boys =

American hip-hop group

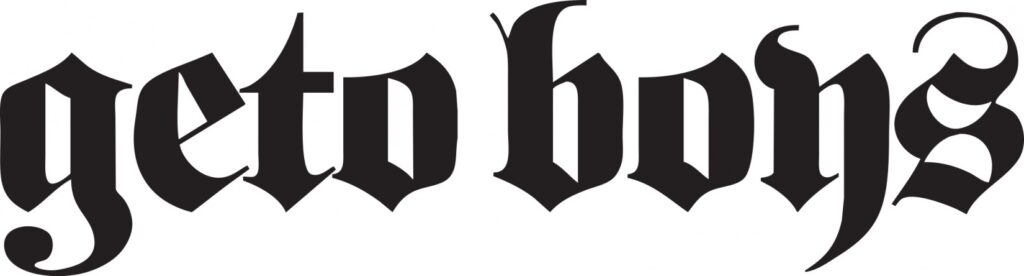

Background information
- Also known as: Ghetto Boys (1986–1990)
- Origin: Houston, Texas, U.S.
- Genres: Southern hip-hop; hardcore hip-hop; gangsta rap; G-funk; horrorcore
- Years active: 1986–2019
- Labels: Rap-a-Lot; Def American
- Past members: Willie D; Scarface; Bushwick Bill; Raheem; Sir Rap-A-Lot; Sire Jukebox; Prince Johnny C; DJ Ready Red; Big Mike

The Geto Boys (originally spelled Ghetto Boys) were an American hip-hop group originally formed in Houston. In the 1990s, they had commercial success with a lineup consisting of Bushwick Bill, Willie D, and Scarface. Their 1991 single "Mind Playing Tricks on Me" peaked at number 23 on the Billboard Hot 100. Formed in 1986, the group was active until the 2019 death of Bushwick Bill.

The group's lyrics discussed controversial subject matter including misogyny, violence, psychotic experiences, and drug addiction. About.com ranked the Geto Boys No. 10 on its list of the 25 Best Rap Groups of All-Time, describing them as "southern rap pioneers who led to future southern hip-hop acts."

== History ==
The original Ghetto Boys consisted first of Raheem, The Sire Jukebox, and Sir Rap-A-Lot. When Raheem and Sir Rap-A-Lot left, the group added DJ Ready Red, Prince Johnny C, and Little Billy, the dancer who later came to be known as Bushwick Bill. The first single the group released was "Car Freak" in 1986, which then followed with two singles: "You Ain't Nothin'/I Run This" in 1987, and "Be Down" in 1988. In 1988, the group released its debut album, Making Trouble. With the release receiving very little attention, the group broke up shortly thereafter and a new line-up was put together in which Bushwick Bill was joined by Scarface and Willie D, both aspiring solo artists. This new line-up recorded the 1989 album, Grip It! On That Other Level. The group's 1990 album, The Geto Boys, caused Def American Recordings, the label to which the group was signed at the time, to switch distributors from Geffen Records to Warner Bros. Records (with marketing for the album done by Warner Bros. sister label Giant Records) because of controversy over the lyrics.

In the early 1990s, several American politicians attacked rap artists associated with the subgenre gangsta rap including the Geto Boys. A high-profile incident in which Bushwick Bill lost an eye in a shooting helped boost sales of the group's 1991 album We Can't Be Stopped. The album cover features a graphic picture of the injured Bushwick being carted through a hospital by Scarface and Willie D. On the album's title track, the group responded to Geffen Records ending its distribution deal with Def American. The album featured the single "Mind Playing Tricks on Me," which became a hit and charted at No. 23 on the Billboard Hot 100.

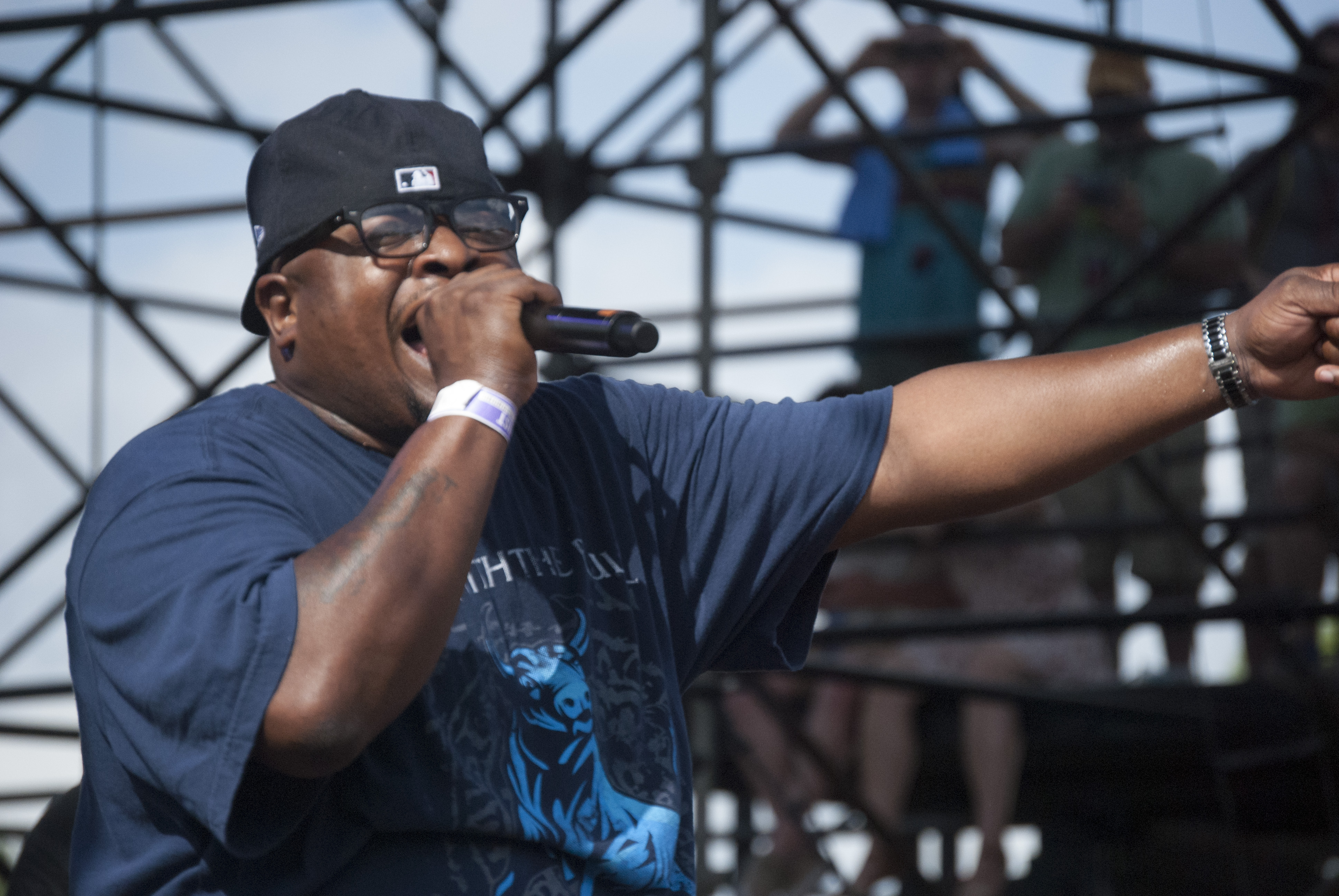
Scarface rapping at Free Press Summer Fest in Houston, June 2013

After Willie D left the group, Scarface and Bushwick Bill continued with the Geto Boys with the addition of Big Mike, who made his debut appearance with the group on 1993's album Till Death Do Us Part. Till Death Do Us Part was certified gold. The album spawned one top 40 hit in "Six Feet Deep" which peaked at No. 40 on the Billboard Hot 100. Then Big Mike was dropped and Willie D returned for 1996's critically acclaimed The Resurrection, and the 1998 followup Da Good Da Bad & Da Ugly, of which Bushwick Bill was not a part. After three years on hiatus, the group reunited in 2002 to record its seventh album, The Foundation, which was released on January 25, 2005. The Geto Boys were featured on Scarface's My Homies Part 2 album.

The song "Street Life" from Till Death Do Us Part was featured on the motion picture South Central. A video clip for the song with footage from the film was released. Although the band rarely releases albums or perform together, the group came together for a reunion at Cypress Hill's SmokeOut festival in San Bernardino, California on October 23, 2009. In 2010, Bushwick Bill was threatened with deportation to Jamaica. In a 2015 DJ Vlad interview, Scarface said that he will not be involved in another Geto Boys album. On August 24, 2018, founding member DJ Ready Red died at the age of 53, from an apparent heart attack.

After the stage 4 pancreatic cancer diagnosis of Bushwick Bill in early 2019, a farewell tour, titled The Beginning of a Long Goodbye, The Final Farewell was announced, with a portion of the proceeds being donated to pancreatic cancer awareness. However, the tour was canceled just before its anticipated start. On June 9, 2019, Bushwick Bill died as a result of pancreatic cancer, at the age of 52.

== Lyrics and influence ==
The group's name, Geto Boys, comes from an alternate spelling of the word "ghetto". For its first two albums, Making Trouble (1988) and Grip It! On That Other Level (1989), the spelling was the English standard "Ghetto Boys". For their third album, The Geto Boys, they changed it to the "Geto" spelling, which the group has used since then. The Geto Boys' lyrics push gangsta rap themes to extremes, and sometimes focus on murder, explicit sex, and violence. The group is credited for putting Southern hip-hop on the hip-hop music map and inspired a legion of acts including 2Pac, Eminem, UGK, T.I., Goodie Mob, Outkast, 50 Cent, Chamillionaire, Jay-Z, Lil Wayne, Rick Ross, Young Jeezy, Juvenile, Mystikal, Mac Lethal, Esham, and Insane Clown Posse. Insane Clown Posse's Violent J (Joseph Bruce) said the Geto Boys were the first rappers to perform horrorcore, with their song "Assassins", released on their debut album, Making Trouble. Bruce adds that the Geto Boys continued to pioneer the style with their second release Grip It! On That Other Level, with songs such as "Mind of a Lunatic" and "Trigga-Happy Nigga". Conversely, "The Unseen", a song which appears on the group's compilation Uncut Dope, expresses anti-abortion views.

The Geto Boys' popularity was boosted somewhat in 1999 by the prominent use of two songs—"Damn It Feels Good to Be a Gangsta" (released as a promotional single for the 1992 compilation album Uncut Dope) and "Still" (from The Resurrection)—in Office Space, Mike Judge's comedy satire film. The song "Mind of a Lunatic" has been covered by many recording acts like Marilyn Manson in 2003, as a B-side off the album The Golden Age of Grotesque. The single "Damn It Feels Good to Be a Gangsta" has also been covered by the band Aqueduct and country singer Carter Falco.

The Geto Boys were heavily influenced by the social politics of the day. Their lyrics consistently include themes ranging from police brutality (such as in "Crooked Officer") to concerns over the negative impact of violence on the urban community (such as "The World Is a Ghetto", "Geto Fantasy", and "Six Feet Deep").

== Discography ==
Studio albums

- Making Trouble (1988)
- Grip It! On That Other Level (1989)
- The Geto Boys (1990)
- We Can't Be Stopped (1991)
- Till Death Do Us Part (1993)
- The Resurrection (1996)
- Da Good da Bad & da Ugly (1998)
- The Foundation (2005)

== Band members ==
- Willie D – vocals (1989–1992, 1996–2019)
- Scarface – vocals (1989–2019)

=== Former members ===
- Bushwick Bill – hype man (1986–1989), vocals (1989–1997, 2002–2016; died 2019)
- Prince Johnny C. – vocals (1986–1989), production (1988–1991)
- Raheem – vocals (1986–1987)
- Sir Rap-A-Lot – vocals (1986–1987)
- Sire Jukebox – vocals (1986–1989)
- DJ Ready Red – vocals, turntables, production (1986–1991; died 2018)
- Big Mike – vocals (1992–1994)
