= Tone Capone =

American hip-hop producer and DJ (1966–2026)

- Born: Anthony Douglas Gilmour; November 5, 1966; Berkeley, California, U.S.
- Died: September 12, 2026 (aged 59); Las Vegas, Nevada, U.S.
- Occupation: Hip-hop producer
- Notable work: "I Got 5 on It"

Anthony Douglas Gilmour (November 5, 1966 – September 12, 2026), known professionally as Tone Capone, was an American hip-hop producer and DJ. He is credited with bringing the mobb music style of Bay Area hip-hop to a wider audience with his work on Luniz' 1995 hit single "I Got 5 on It", which reached No. 8 on the Billboard Hot 100 and has been called "hip-hop's ultimate weed anthem".

== Early life and career ==
Gilmour was born on November 5, 1966 in Berkeley, California, and raised in North Oakland. He learned to DJ at Berkeley High School using turntables borrowed from a friend, and started playing at parties. When he left school in the mid-1980s, he began producing tracks for the likes of SWV and Oakland hip-hop group Capital Tax, using the stage names DJG and DJ Smooth G. He adopted the name Tone Capone around 1993. One of his schoolfriends was R&B singer Michael Marshall, and it was Capone's idea to have Marshall sing the chorus of "I Got 5 on It", which the members of Luniz had originally rapped.

A prolific producer, he produced tracks for multiple Bay Area artists including 3X Krazy, Mac Dre, Celly Cel, E-40, The Jacka, Dru Down, The Click, The Conscious Daughters, Mac Mall, Messy Marv, Andre Nickatina, Spice 1 and San Quinn, along with Houston-based rappers such as Devin the Dude and Scarface. After working in the early 1990s with Oakland rapper Seagram, who was signed to Rap-A-Lot Records, Capone was introduced to Rap-A-Lot CEO J. Prince, who placed protege Mike Dean with Capone to develop his production skills. Through Dean, he was introduced to Scarface, and the three produced much of the 1997 album The Untouchable. Scarface included Capone on a list of all-time greatest producers in his memoir Diary of a Madman, alongside the likes of Dr. Dre, Pharrell Williams and Timbaland.

== Death ==
Gilmour died on September 12, 2026, in Las Vegas, Nevada, where he had lived from 2021. He was 59 and retired from the music industry at the time, having previously worked at a hospital.

== Selected production credits ==
- SWV – "SWV (In The House)" (1992) (with Brian Alexander Morgan)
- Eric B. & Rakim – "Casualties Of War (Militant Remix)" (1992)
- Capital Tax – The Swoll Package (1993)
- Luniz – "I Got 5 on It" (1995)
- Celly Cel – "It's Goin' Down" (1996) (with One Drop Scott)
- E-40 – "Ring It" (1996)
- 3X Krazy – "Keep It on the Real", "Ghetto Soldiers", "Get 'Em" (with One Drop Scott); "Next Niggas Ho", "Can't Fuck With This", "Stackin Chips", "West Coast Shit", "Tired of the Pain" (1997)
- Scarface – "Untouchable" (with Scarface, N.O. Joe & Mike Dean); "Southside", "Money Makes the World Go Round", "Mary Jane", "Smile", "Smartz" (with Scarface & Mike Dean); "Faith" (with Scarface, Mike Dean & Domo) (1997)
- Devin the Dude – "Sticky Green", "Georgy" (1998)
- Mac Dre – "Fire" (1999)
- Mac Dre – "2 Times & Pass", "Genie of the Lamp", "Not My Job" (2004)
