= Scarface (rapper) =

American rapper (born 1970)

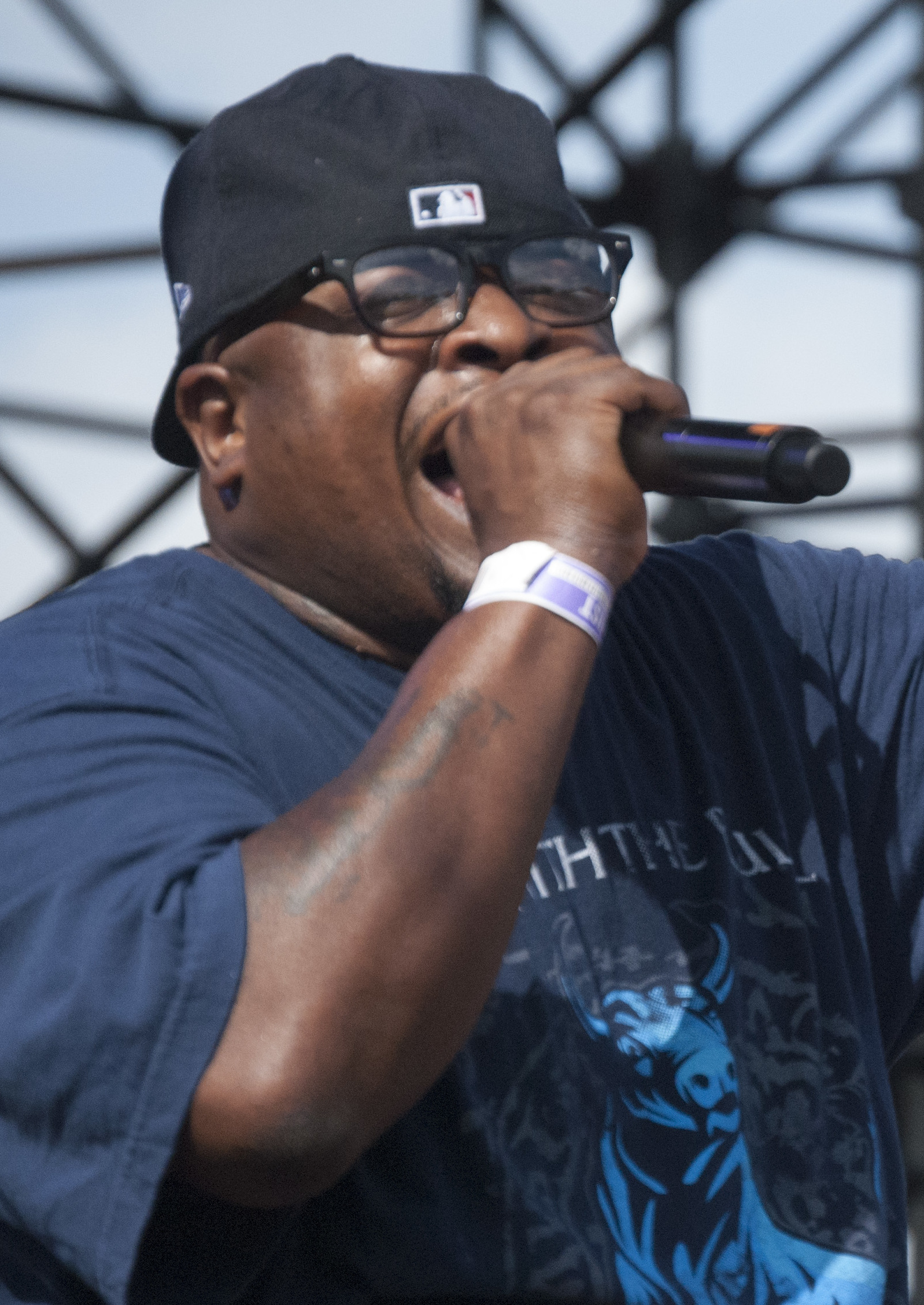
- Scarface performing in 2013

Background information
- Also known as: Mr. Scarface; Face; DJ Akshen; Facemob; Creepy
- Born: Brad Terrence Jordan; November 9, 1970 (age 56); Houston, Texas, U.S.
- Genre: Southern hip-hop
- Occupations: Rapper; songwriter; record producer
- Works: Solo; with the Geto Boys
- Years active: 1988–present
- Labels: Rap-A-Lot; Asylum; Def Jam South; Def Jam
- Formerly of: Geto Boys

Brad Terrence Jordan (born November 9, 1970), better known by his stage name Scarface, is an American rapper and record producer, notable for his solo career and as a member of the Geto Boys, a hip-hop group from Houston, Texas. Raised in the city's South Acres (Crestmont Park) neighborhood, he has been ranked by The Source as one of the Top 50 Lyricists of All Time, while About.com ranked him in the top ten of its "50 Greatest MCs of Our Time (1987–2007)" list.

== Early life and education ==
Jordan attended Woodson Middle School in Houston, Texas. He dropped out of high school and worked as a drug dealer. As a teenager, he attempted suicide, and subsequently spent time in a hospital psychiatric ward. Jordan credits his experience attending therapy sessions in the psychiatric ward with having shaped the introspective style he would later adopt as a rapper.

== Career ==
Jordan began his career as DJ Akshen (A backronym for "All Krazy Shit Has Ended Now" and pronounced "Action"), recording and deejaying for Lil' Troy's Short Stop, which was a local record label in Houston, before adopting the name "Scarface" as a reference to the 1983 film by that name. After releasing the 12" single "Scarface/Another Head Put To Rest" (1989), which was written by Chris "Mr. 3-2" Barriere and produced by Def Jam Blaster and Bruce "Grim" Rhodes, Scarface signed with Rap-A-Lot Records and joined the Geto Boys, replacing a member who left. The first Geto Boys album he appeared on was the group's second album, Grip It! On That Other Level (1989), a highly successful album that garnered the group a large fanbase. Radio and MTV refused to play any songs from the album because of their violent lyrics; however, the album made the Geto Boys into one of the most successful Southern hip-hop groups of their era.

In 1992, Scarface (along with fellow Geto Boys member Bushwick Bill) appeared on the Kool G Rap & DJ Polo album Live and Let Die. This collaboration was viewed as notable due to the influential roles that Scarface and Kool G Rap have played in Southern hip-hop and East Coast hip-hop respectively. During this period of his career, Scarface also worked with the West Coast gangsta rap stars Ice Cube and MC Eiht, as well as with his friend Devin the Dude, a fellow Rap-A-Lot signee.

Scarface's 1991 solo album Mr. Scarface Is Back was a success, and his popularity soon overshadowed that of the other Geto Boys. Scarface remained in the group, but he released a series of solo albums that kept him in the public eye, and they sold well. Scarface is the only Geto Boys member who has remained with the group ever since the lineup was revamped in 1989. Scarface's popularity as a solo artist peaked with the albums The Diary and The Last of a Dying Breed. In particular, The Last of the Dying Breed achieved both critical and commercial success, and led Scarface to be named "Lyricist of the Year" at the 2001 Source Awards. In 2002, Scarface released The Fix, the follow-up to The Last of a Dying Breed. The Fix was another highly successful album, which featured a wide range of high-profile guests such as Nas, Jay-Z, Faith Evans, Kelly Price, WC, and Beanie Sigel.

It was around this time that Scarface also returned to the studio with the Geto Boys for what turned out to be their final album as a trio, The Foundation (2005). Further, he was featured on Duets: The Final Chapter, a posthumous album by the Notorious B.I.G.. Scarface also made guest appearances on a variety of other tracks throughout the 2000s, including on albums by Beanie Sigel, Freeway, and Tech N9ne.

In addition to his career as a rapper, Scarface was the coordinator and president of Def Jam South from 2000 to 2005, where he fostered the career of the rapper Ludacris. He also produced three tracks for the UGK album Underground Kingz.

Despite his limited commercial appeal, Scarface has consistently attained wide respect from within the industry, and he has been described as "your favorite rapper's favorite rapper".

It's one thing for someone to rap and paint you a picture that you see, it's another one for a rapper to rap and you feel it.

— Charlie Braxton (journalist, playwright, poet, cultural critic, and music historian) on Scarface

On June 30, 2010, Scarface announced that he was working on a new album titled The Habit, which would include features from John Legend and Drake, and that it was scheduled for release that fall. For one production on the album, Scarface co-hosted a worldwide producer showcase with iStandard from which thousands of producers were considered and after a selection of the top 8, Alex Kresovich was named winner. The album would feature a production from Eminem. In February 2011, news came that he had been held in jail without bail since September 2010 for failure to pay child support in four different cases. He was released from jail in August 2011 and as of 2024, The Habit remains an unreleased album with no announcements made since the arrest. Scarface released a separate album titled Deeply Rooted in 2015.

== Media appearances ==
Scarface also appeared in the Mike Judge film Idiocracy as a pimp named Upgrayedd. Judge also used the Scarface track "No Tears" and Geto Boys tracks "Still" and "Damn It Feels Good to Be a Gangsta" in his 1999 film Office Space.

He has appeared in the two video games: Def Jam Vendetta and its sequel Def Jam: Fight For NY.

At the 2015 BET Hip Hop Awards, he received the I Am Hip Hop award.

== Political career ==
On June 10, 2019, Jordan launched his campaign to be elected as the Councilperson for District D of the Houston City Council when the current seat holder, Dwight Boykins, decided to run for mayor. He announced his candidacy a day after the death of his friend and bandmate Bushwick Bill. Jordan's campaign was defined by the vision of "putting the neighbor back in the hood," which is the motto of Positive Purpose Movement, an organization that he founded. The organization works with area schools to promote education and empowerment among children from underrepresented communities.

Jordan was quoted in The Washington Post stating that "Scarface is dead." Positioning himself as a viable candidate for City Council, he emphasized his desire to build a legacy of public service when he added, "I'm not going to be a 75-year-old rapper... I'm going to be finishing my last term in office as president when I'm 75". Jordan was defeated by former educator Carolyn Evans-Shabazz in a run-off election on December 15, 2019.

== Personal life ==
Scarface converted to Islam in 2006.

Scarface claims to be a cousin of singer Johnny Nash. He also owns and collects Gibson Les Paul electric guitars.

In March 2020, Scarface revealed that he had tested positive for COVID-19. The virus damaged his renal system and on September 14, 2021, Scarface received a kidney transplant from his son.

== Biography ==
Scarface released a memoir on April 21, 2015, which details various moments from his childhood, getting his first record deal from Rap-A-Lot, and his tenure at Def Jam South.

- Diary of a Madman (2015)

== Discography ==
Studio albums

- Mr. Scarface Is Back (1991)
- The World Is Yours (1993)
- The Diary (1994)
- The Untouchable (1997)
- My Homies (1998)
- The Last of a Dying Breed (2000)
- The Fix (2002)
- My Homies Part 2 (2006)
- Made (2007)
- Emeritus (2008)
- Deeply Rooted (2015)

Collaborative albums

- The Other Side of the Law (with Facemob) (1996)
- One Hunid (with The Product) (2006)
