= Twista discography =

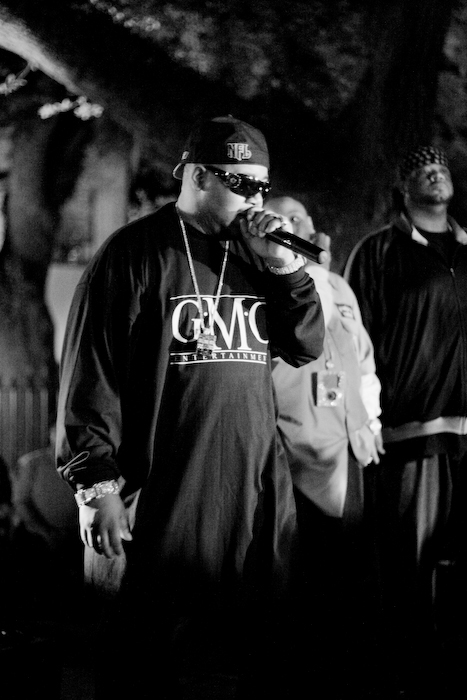
- Studio albums: 10
- Extended plays: 4
- Singles: 12
- Featured singles: 9
- Mixtapes: 3

This is the discography of Twista, an American rapper from Chicago, Illinois.

== Albums ==
=== Studio albums ===
List of studio albums, with selected chart positions and certifications
| Title | Album details | Peak chart positions | | | | | Certifications |
| Title | Album details | US | US R&B | US Rap | AUS | UK | Certifications |
|---|---|---|---|---|---|---|---|
| Runnin' Off at da Mouth | Released: June 9, 1992; Label: Loud, Zoo; Format: CD, LP, cassette, digital download | — | — | — | — | — | |
| Adrenaline Rush | Released: June 24, 1997; Label: Creator's Way, Big Beat, Atlantic; Format: CD, LP, cassette, digital download | 77 | 13 | — | — | — | RIAA: Platinum |
| Mobstability (with Speedknot Mobstaz) | Released: October 6, 1998; Label: Creator's Way, Big Beat, Atlantic; Format: CD, LP, cassette, digital download | 34 | 9 | — | — | — | |
| Kamikaze | Released: January 27, 2004; Label: Atlantic; Format: CD, LP, cassette, digital download | 1 | 1 | — | 76 | 19 | RIAA: 2× Platinum; BPI: Gold |
| The Day After | Released: October 4, 2005; Label: Atlantic; Format: CD, LP, digital download | 2 | 1 | 1 | — | 100 | RIAA: Gold |
| Adrenaline Rush 2007 | Released: September 18, 2007; Label: Atlantic; Format: CD, digital download | 10 | 4 | 4 | — | — | |
| Category F5 | Released: July 14, 2009; Label: GMG, EMI; Format: CD, digital download | 8 | 3 | 1 | — | — | |
| The Perfect Storm | Released: November 9, 2010; Label: GMG, EMI; Format: CD, digital download | 38 | 7 | 4 | — | — | |
| Dark Horse | Released: August 12, 2014; Label: GMG, Caroline; Format: CD, digital download | 40 | 8 | 5 | — | — | |
| Crook County | Released: July 7, 2017; Label: GMG, Empire; Format: CD, digital download | — | — | — | — | — | |

=== Compilation albums ===
List of compilation albums, with selected chart positions
| Title | Album details | Peak chart positions | | |
| Title | Album details | US | US R&B | US Rap |
|---|---|---|---|---|
| Adrenaline Rush 2000 | Released: December 5, 2000; Label: Innovations; Format: CD, digital download | — | 95 | — |
| Soft Buck, Vol. 1 | Released: September 2, 2008; Label: Siccness; Format: CD, digital download | — | 62 | — |

== Extended plays ==
| Title | EP details |
|---|---|
| 2 for 10 | Released: November 15, 2005; Label: Atlantic; Format: CD, digital download |
| Back to the Basics | Released: December 10, 2013; Label: GMG; Format: CD, digital download |
| Withdrawal (with Do or Die) | Released: May 19, 2015; Label: GMG; Format: CD, digital download |
| Livin Legend | Released: December 4, 2015; Label: GMG; Format: CD, digital download |
| Lifetime | Released: February 14, 2020; Label: GMG; Format: CD, digital download |
| News @ 9 (with Rello Dreamer) | Released: May 14, 2021; Label: GMG; Format: Digital download |
| Shooter Ready | Released: September 10, 2021; Label: GMG; Format: Digital download |

== Mixtapes ==
| Title | Mixtape details |
|---|---|
| The Black Jason of Rap (with DJ Sean Mac) | Released: November 6, 2007; Label: BCD; Format: Digital download |
| Reloaded (Hosted by Don Cannon) | Released: September 4, 2012; Label: GMG; Format: Digital download |
| Summer 96 (Hosted by DJ Pharris) | Released: June 28, 2019; Label: GMG; Format: Digital download |

== Singles ==
=== As lead artist ===
List of singles, with selected chart positions and certifications, showing year released and album name
| Year | Title | Peak chart positions | | | | | Certifications | Album |
| Year | Title | US | US R&B | US Rap | AUS | UK | Certifications | Album |
|---|---|---|---|---|---|---|---|---|
| 1991 | "Mr. Tung Twista" | — | — | — | — | — | | Runnin' Off at da Mouth |
| 1997 | "Emotions" | 101 | 50 | 11 | — | — | | Adrenaline Rush |
| 1997 | "Get It Wet" (featuring Ms. Kane) | 96 | 62 | 12 | — | — | | Adrenaline Rush |
| 2003 | "Slow Jamz" (featuring Kanye West and Jamie Foxx) | 1 | 1 | 1 | 26 | 3 | RIAA: 3× Platinum; BPI: Platinum | The College Dropout / Kamikaze |
| 2004 | "Overnight Celebrity" | 6 | 2 | 1 | — | 16 | RIAA: 2× Platinum; BPI: Silver | Kamikaze |
| 2004 | "So Sexy" (featuring R. Kelly) | 25 | 10 | 7 | 43 | 28 | | Kamikaze |
| 2004 | "Sunshine" (featuring Anthony Hamilton) | — | — | — | 17 | 3 | BPI: Silver | Kamikaze |
| 2004 | "So Sexy: Chapter II (Like This)" (featuring R. Kelly) | 92 | 47 | — | — | — | | Kamikaze |
| 2005 | "Hope" (featuring Faith Evans) | 31 | 24 | 17 | 48 | 25 | | Kamikaze / The First Lady |
| 2005 | "Girl Tonite" (featuring Trey Songz) | 14 | 3 | 2 | — | 47 | RIAA: Gold | The Day After |
| 2005 | "Hit the Floor" (featuring Pitbull) | 94 | 125 | 20 | — | — | | The Day After |
| 2005 | "What We Do" (with Kray Twinz, Lethal Bizzle and Gappy Ranks) | — | — | — | — | 23 | | Against All Oddz |
| 2006 | "So Lonely" (featuring Mariah Carey) | 114 | 65 | — | — | — | | The Day After |
| 2007 | "Give It Up" (featuring Pharrell) | — | 88 | — | — | — | | Adrenaline Rush 2007 |
| 2009 | "Wetter" | 44 | 7 | 3 | — | — | RIAA: Platinum | Category F5 |
| 2009 | "On Top" (featuring Akon) | 101 | — | — | — | — | | Category F5 |
| 2010 | "Make a Movie" (featuring Chris Brown) | 71 | 6 | 6 | — | — | RIAA: Gold | The Perfect Storm |
| 2013 | "Throwin' My Money" (featuring R. Kelly) | — | — | — | — | — | | The Dark Horse |
| 2016 | "Next to You" (featuring Jeremih) | — | — | — | — | — | | Crook County |

=== Other charted songs ===
| Year | Song | Peak chart positions | Album |
| Year | Song | US R&B | Album |
|---|---|---|---|
| 2003 | "Champions" (with Dame Dash, Kanye West, Beanie Sigel, Cam'ron and Young Chris) | 109 | Paid In Full/Dream Team |
| 2006 | "Lavish" (featuring Pharrell Williams) | 116 | The Day After |
| 2007 | "Whip Game Proper" (featuring Lil Wayne) | 109 | Adrenaline Rush 2007 |
| 2007 | "This Is Why I'm Cold" (featuring R. Kelly and Speedknot Mobstaz) | 119 | Non-album Single |
| 2009 | "Yellow Light" (featuring R. Kelly) | 107 | Category F5 |

=== As featured artist ===
| Year | Song | Peak chart positions | | | | | Certifications | Album |
| Year | Song | US | US R&B | US Rap | US Rhyth | UK | Certifications | Album |
|---|---|---|---|---|---|---|---|---|
| 1996 | "Po Pimp" (Do or Die featuring Twista) | 22 | 15 | 1 | 39 | — | RIAA: Gold | Picture This |
| 1998 | "What U On" (LaTanya featuring Twista) | 85 | 44 | — | — | — | | The Album |
| 1998 | "Still Po Pimpin'" (Do or Die featuring Twista) | 62 | 44 | 16 | — | — | | Headz or Tailz |
| 2000 | "Is That Your Chick (The Lost Verses)" (Memphis Bleek featuring Jay-Z, Twista, and Missy Elliott) | 68 | 19 | 7 | — | — | | The Understanding |
| 2004 | "Stolen Car (Take Me Dancing)" (B Recluse Remix) (Sting featuring Twista) | — | 9 | — | — | — | | Non-album single |
| 2004 | "Let's Go" (Trick Daddy featuring Lil Jon and Twista) | 7 | 10 | 4 | 4 | 26 | RIAA: Gold | Thug Matrimony: Married to the Streets |
| 2004 | "Gotta Have It" (Beanie Sigel featuring Twista) | — | 82 | — | — | — | | The B. Coming |
| 2005 | "I's a Playa" (Pimp C featuring Bun B, Twista and Z-Ro) | — | 105 | — | — | — | | Sweet James Jones Stories |
| 2005 | "Gotta Make It" (Trey Songz featuring Twista) | 87 | 21 | — | — | — | | I Gotta Make It |
| 2005 | "DJ Play a Love Song" (Jamie Foxx featuring Twista) | 45 | 5 | — | 34 | — | RIAA: Gold | Unpredictable |
| 2006 | "Spit Your Game" (The Notorious B.I.G. featuring Twista and Krayzie Bone) | — | 68 | — | — | 64 | | Duets: The Final Chapter |
| 2006 | "Don't Get It Twisted" (Mr. Capone-E featuring Twista) | — | — | — | 40 | — | | Don't Get It Twisted |
| 2007 | "5000 Ones" (DJ Drama featuring Diddy, Jazze Pha, Nelly, T.I., Yung Joc, Willie the Kid, Young Jeezy, and Twista) | — | 73 | — | — | — | | Gangsta Grillz: The Album |
| 2007 | "Hell No (Leave Home)" (Monica featuring Twista) | — | 114 | — | — | — | | The Makings of Me |
| 2008 | "Money" (Bizzy Bone featuring Twista) | — | — | 12 | — | — | | A Song for You |
| 2008 | "Cuddy Buddy" (Mike Jones featuring T-Pain, Lil Wayne and Twista) | 76 | 34 | 16 | 15 | — | RIAA: Gold | The Voice |
| 2011 | "Welcome to My Hood" (Remix) (DJ Khaled featuring Ludacris, T-Pain, Busta Rhymes, Mavado, Twista, Birdman, Ace Hood, Fat Joe, Jadakiss, Bun B, Game & Waka Flocka Flame) | — | — | — | — | — | | We the Best Forever |
| 2011 | "Worldwide Choppers" (Tech N9ne featuring Twista, Busta Rhymes, Yelawolf, Ceza, U$O, D-Loc, Twisted Insane & J.L. of B. Hood) | 104 | — | — | — | — | | All 6's And 7's |
| 2011 | "Pocahontas" (Shawty Lo featuring Twista & Wale) | — | — | — | — | — | | Still Got Units |
| 2011 | "Grab Somebody" (Bobby V featuring Twista) | — | 70 | — | — | — | | Fly on the Wall |
| 2011 | "Helicopter" (Lil Scrappy featuring Twista & 2 Chainz) | — | — | — | — | — | | Tha Grustle |
| 2015 | "Star Warz" (Outsider featuring Twista) | — | — | — | — | — | | Pride And Prejudice |
| 2020 | "Overdue" (Mansuki featuring Twista) | — | — | — | — | — | | non-album single |
| 2020 | "Faded 2nite" (Dandrell Scott featuring Twista & Jacinta) | — | — | — | — | — | | Faded 2nite (single) |
| 2022 | Reload the Wesson (Aaron Carter featuring Twista) | — | — | — | — | — | | non-album single |
| 2024 | "Burning In My Soul (Just A Freak)" (Syleena Johnson featuring Twista & Shawnna) | — | — | — | — | — | | Legacy |

== Guest appearances ==
List of non-single guest appearances, with other performing artists, showing year released and album name
| Title | Year | Other artist(s) | Album |
|---|---|---|---|
| "Chi-Town Ride" | 1995 | Subway | Chi Town Ride |
| "Paper Chase" | 1996 | Do or Die | Picture This |
| "Money Flow" | 1996 | Do or Die | Picture This |
| "Nice & Slow (Remix)" | 1997 | Usher | —N/a |
| "Is This the End?" | 1997 | Puff Daddy, Carl Thomas, Ginuwine | No Way Out |
| "All or Nuthin" | 1998 | Ras Kass | Rasassination |
| "In Your World" | 1998 | Speedknotts | Dr. Dolittle Soundtrack |
| "Who Am I" | 1998 | Timbaland | Tim's Bio: Life from da Bassment |
| "Smoked Out" | 1999 | Tear Da Club Up Thugs | CrazyNDaLazDayz |
| "Straight Thuggin'" | 1999 | Kane & Abel, Sole | Rise to Power |
| "Ride Till We Die" | 1999 | Coo Coo Cal | Walkin' Dead |
| "Intro" | 2000 | Da Brat | Unrestricted |
| "Could It Be" | 2000 | Trick Daddy | Book of Thugs: Chapter AK Verse 47 |
| "Watch Yo Back" | 2000 | Trina | Da Baddest Bitch |
| "Twisted Heat" | 2000 | Ruff Ryders, Drag-On, Swizz Beatz | Ryde or Die Vol. 2 |
| "Everywhere" | 2000 | Fiend, Speedknot Mobstaz | Can I Burn? |
| "Still Ride Till We Die" | 2001 | Coo Coo Cal | Disturbed |
| "Don't Hate Me" | 2001 | 112 | Part III |
| "Freaky Thangs" | 2001 | Ludacris, Jagged Edge | Word of Mouf |
| "Ova Wit" | 2001 | Mind Body & Soul, Shawnna | Da Home of Capone |
| "Party People" | 2001 | Timbaland & Magoo, Jay-Z | Indecent Proposal |
| "Let's Go" | 2002 | Royce da 5'9" | Rock City |
| "Full Moon (Remix)" | 2002 | Brandy | Full Moon: Remixes |
| "Aw Naw" (Remix) | 2002 | Nappy Roots, Jazze Pha, Cam'Ron | —N/a |
| "R.P.M." | 2002 | Shawnna, Ludacris | Golden Grain /Worth tha Weight |
| "Quit Hatin' Pt.1" | 2002 | Too Short, V-White, Lil Jon & The East Side Boyz | What's My Favorite Word? |
| "Sex Appeal" | 2002 | Do or Die, Johnny P | Back 2 the Game |
| "What's Your Flava?" (Remix) | 2002 | Craig David | —N/a |
| "Popppin' Tags" | 2002 | Jay-Z, Big Boi, Killer Mike | The Blueprint 2: The Gift & The Curse |
| "Thug Luv" | 2003 | Lil' Kim | La Bella Mafia |
| "Beware of the Boys" (Remix) | 2003 | Panjabi MC | —N/a |
| "Blow" | 2003 | State Property, Oschino, Omillio Sparks, Young Chris | The Chain Gang Vol. 2 |
| "Do U?" | 2003 | Do or Die, Johnny P | Pimpin' Ain't Dead |
| "Neva Eva" (Remix) | 2004 | Trillville, Lil Scrappy | The King of Crunk & BME Recordings Present: Trillville |
| "Confessions Part II" (Remix) | 2004 | Usher, Shyne, Kanye West | Confessions (Special edition) |
| "Get Retarded" | 2004 | DJ Kay Slay, The Diplomats | The Streetsweeper 2 |
| "Get Up Get Off" | 2004 | The Prodigy | Always Outnumbered, Never Outgunned |
| "Look at the Grillz" | 2004 | 8Ball & MJG, T.I. | Living Legends |
| "Got It Twisted" (Remix) | 2004 | Mobb Deep | Amerikaz Nightmare |
| "The Come Thru" | 2004 | Jin | The Rest Is History |
| "Mo' Money" | 2004 | Jay-Z & R. Kelly | Unfinished Business |
| "Freek-a-Leek" (Remix) | 2004 | Petey Pablo, Jermaine Dupri | Kamikaze |
| "Adrenaline" | 2004 | Cam'ron, Psycho Drama | Purple Haze |
| "If Only You Knew" | 2005 | Do or Die, Syleena Johnson | DOD |
| "One and Only" | 2005 | Mariah Carey | The Emancipation of Mimi |
| "Hit it Till the Mornin'" | 2005 | R. Kelly, Do or Die | TP.3 Reloaded |
| "So Hot" | 2005 | Charlie Wilson | Charlie, Last Name Wilson |
| "On Everything" | 2005 | David Banner | Certified |
| "Phone Sex" | 2005 | Syleena Johnson | Chapter 3: The Flesh |
| "We Don't Give a Fuck" | 2005 | Lil' Kim, Bun B | The Naked Truth |
| "Midwest Invasion" | 2005 | Layzie Bone | It's Not a Game |
| "I'm N Luv (Wit a Stripper)" (Remix) | 2005 | T-Pain, Pimp C, Paul Wall, R. Kelly, MJG, Too Short | Rappa Ternt Sanga (Australian edition) |
| "Impossible" | 2006 | Kanye West, Keyshia Cole | Mission: Impossible III (soundtrack) |
| "Destroy You" | 2006 | DJ Khaled, Bone Thugs-N-Harmony | Listennn... the Album |
| "Knock Them Out" | 2006 | DJ Kay Slay, Speedknot Mobstaz | The Champions: North Meets South |
| "Diddy Rock" | 2006 | Diddy, Timbaland, Shawnna | Press Play |
| "The Way She's Built" | 2007 | Kev Samples | The Rush |
| "C-Town" | 2007 | Bone Thugs-N-Harmony | Strength & Loyalty |
| "Where Do We Go" | 2007 | Young Berg | Almost Famous: The Sexy Lady EP |
| "Candyman" | 2007 | Pitbull | The Boatlift |
| "Beneath the Diamonds" | 2007 | DJ Drama, Devin the Dude, La the Darkman, Mr. Porter | Gangsta Grillz: The Album |
| "Like My Birthday" | 2008 | Kenny P | It Is What It Is |
| "Anthem" | 2008 | Big Kuntry King, BG | Cocaine Kuntry |
| "Dangerous" (Remix) | 2008 | Kardinal Offishall, Akon, Sean Paul | —N/a |
| "Burn This City" | 2008 | Swishahouse, Lil Wayne | No Time to Waste |
| "What Cha'll Wanna Do" | 2008 | Bareda, Los | Just Like Me |
| "Getcha Money Right" | 2008 | Speedknot Mobstaz | Mobstability II: Nation Business |
| "Why???" | 2008 | Prozak, Tech N9ne | Tales from The Sick |
| "Ain't on Shit" | 2008 | The Alchemist | The Cutting Room Floor 2 |
| "Git It Git It" | 2008 | Stack$ | CraZee & ConfuZed |
| "We Can Ride" | 2009 | Neema, J-Finesse | My Life for Sale |
| "If You Know Who I Be" | 2009 | Boy Wonder "Chosen Few", Reychesta "Secret Weapon" | Chosen Few: Remix Classicos |
| "Change N' Lanes" | 2009 | Greg Street, Jazzy Pha, Jody Breeze | 6 O'clock Worldwide |
| "Pop N' Lock" | 2009 | Renz Julian, E-40 | Armageddon |
| "Smile" | 2009 | The Alchemist, Maxwell | Chemical Warfare |
| "Jump" | 2009 | Mr. Criminal | Only the Strong Survive |
| "We Ride We Roll" | 2009 | Liffy Stokes | Coach Cellichick |
| "I Won't Change" | 2009 | Trae Tha Truth, Krazye Bone | The Incredible Truth |
| "Freak Show XXX" | 2009 | The New Congress | Anguish, Love And Romance |
| "Legendary" | 2009 | Saurus and Bones, AK47 | Mind Like Mind |
| "Carry Out (Remix)" | 2010 | Timbaland, Justin Timberlake | —N/a |
| "Layed Out" | 2010 | DJ Kay Slay, Bun B, Papoose, Dorrough, Young Chris, Jay Rock | More Than Just a DJ |
| "How Low" (Remix) | 2010 | Ludacris, Rick Ross | —N/a |
| "Bat It Up" | 2010 | Animal | —N/a |
| "Diamonds on My Neck" (Remix) | 2010 | Smitty, Lil Wayne, Swizz Beatz | Fucxxx Smitty |
| "Beat It Up" (Remix) | 2010 | Bertell | —N/a |
| "Slow Jam Mixtape" | 2010 | Jump Smokers | Kings of the Dancefloor! |
| "Laid the Fuck Out" | 2010 | Papoose, Bun B | Papoose Season |
| "I Want Her" | 2010 | Majic Massey | —N/a |
| "Make a Movie" | 2010 | Chamillionaire, Lloyd | —N/a |
| "Speak Easy" | 2010 | Bun B, Bluesman Ceddy St. Louis | Trill OG |
| "Far Away" | 2010 | Mel Buckley | —N/a |
| "Cold As Ice" | 2010 | GLC | Love, Life & Loyalty |
| "Them Hats" | 2010 | Cutthroat | The Takeova |
| "Old Hundreds" | 2011 | Future | Dirty Sprite |
| "Lost" | 2011 | Java Starr, Yukmouth | Radio 420 |
| "Diggin'" | 2011 | MC Magic, Lil Cece, Snow White | The Wire |
| "T & A" | 2011 | J. valentine | The Testimony |
| "Bout Gone" | 2011 | Mr. Lucci, Bo Hagen | V.V.S. |
| "Let's Go" | 2011 | Travis Barker, Yelawolf, Busta Rhymes, Lil' Jon | Give the Drummer Some |
| "Get Stoopid" | 2011 | Asia Major | —N/a |
| "Players Lullaby" | 2011 | Killer Mike | PL3DGE |
| "Linen" | 2011 | Mikkey Halsted | —N/a |
| "I'm Not losing" | 2011 | Carlos Boozer, Mario Winans | —N/a |
| "Look at Me Now" (Remix) | 2011 | Chris Brown, Lil Wayne | —N/a |
| "Hey Lady'" | 2011 | Mike Posner | The Layover |
| "Finally Here" | 2011 | Los | The Crown Ain't Safe |
| "What It Feel Like (Remix)" | 2011 | Lil B | —N/a |
| "Parking Lot" | 2012 | Pill | The Epidemic |
| "I'ma Stop" | 2012 | Too $hort, 50 Cent, Devin The Dude | No Trespassing |
| "Tryna Get It" | 2012 | E-40, T-Pain | The Block Brochure: Welcome to the Soil 2 |
| "Pop Off" | 2012 | Shawnna | She's Alive |
| "Gutta Chick" | 2012 | Trae Tha Truth, Rich Boy, Wayne Blazed, Too Short | Tha Blackprint |
| "Edge of Destruction" | 2012 | MGK, Tech N9ne | Lace Up |
| "Ladies" | 2012 | Jeremih, AK | Late Nights with Jeremih |
| "Girls Around the World" | 2012 | Reese, Gryp Plyz | Reese Vs. The World 2 |
| "Sex in the City" | 2012 | Shawty Redd, Steveo The Writer | Rnpl (Rap Now Produce Later) |
| "She Don't Put It Down" (Remix) | 2013 | Joe Budden, Fabolous, Tank | No Love Lost |
| "Traffic" (Remix) | 2013 | Lil Reese, Young Jeezy | —N/a |
| "Who Don't" | 2013 | Jae Millz | Dead Presidents 2 |
| "Girlfriend" | 2013 | Tony Yayo | Godfather of the Ghetto |
| "Cocoa Butter Kisses" | 2013 | Chance the Rapper, Vic Mensa | Acid Rap |
| "Eyes Open" | 2013 | Havoc | 13 |
| "We Aint the Same" | 2013 | Los, Tank | Becoming King |
| "Jewels N' Drugs" | 2013 | Lady Gaga, T.I., Too Short | Artpop |
| "Work" | 2014 | Ty Dolla $ign, Casey Veggies, Nate Howard | Beach House EP |
| "Bounce" | 2014 | Rittz | Next to Nothing |
| "All That" | 2014 | Dillon Francis, The Rej3ctz | Money Sucks, Friends Rule |
| "Fergsomnia" | 2014 | A$AP Ferg | Ferg Forever |
| "Woosah" | 2015 | Jeremih, Juicy J | Late Nights |
| "Paradise" | 2016 | Stephen Marley, Jasmin Karma | Revelation Pt. II: The Fruit of Life |
| "Moses" | 2016 | Apathy, Bun B | Handshakes with Snakes |
| "The Boardwalk" | 2018 | DJ Whoo Kid, Smith and Hay, Ranna Royce | The Whoodlum Ball |
| "Who Getting High" | 2018 | Pastor Troy | Clubber Lang |
| "Wake Up Call" | 2019 | Rittz, Yelawolf | Put a Crown on It |
| "Lap Dance" | 2020 | Do or Die | The Pass Out |
| "Smoke One More" | 2020 | Do or Die | The Pass Out |
| "Rubi's Rose" | 2022 | The Game, Jeremih | Drillmatic: Heart vs. Mind |
| "Still Alright" | 2024 | Joyner Lucas, Logic | Not Now, I'm Busy |
