= Do or Die discography =

- Studio albums: 8
- Compilation albums: 1
- Singles: 2

The discography of American hip-hop trio Do or Die contains seven studio albums, one compilation and two charting singles.

== Albums ==
=== Studio albums ===
List of albums, with selected chart positions
| Title | Album details | Peak chart positions | | Certifications |
| Title | Album details | US | US R&B | Certifications |
|---|---|---|---|---|
| Picture This | Released: September 3, 1996; Label: Rap-A-Lot; Format: CD, cassette, digital download | 27 | 3 | RIAA: Gold |
| Headz or Tailz | Released: April 7, 1998; Label: Rap-A-Lot; Format: CD, cassette, digital download | 13 | 3 | RIAA: Gold |
| Victory | Released: March 14, 2000; Label: Rap-A-Lot; Format: CD, cassette, digital download | 13 | 4 | |
| Back 2 the Game | Released: August 13, 2002; Label: Rap-A-Lot; Format: CD, cassette, digital download | 64 | 25 | |
| Pimpin' Ain't Dead | Released: August 19, 2003; Label: Rap-A-Lot; Format: CD, cassette, digital download | 115 | 17 | |
| D.O.D. | Released: February 1, 2005; Label: Atlantic; Format: CD, cassette, digital download | 40 | 14 | |
| Get That Paper | Released: March 28, 2006; Label: Rap-A-Lot; Format: CD, cassette, digital download | 159 | 29 | |
| Picture This II | Released: 2015; Label: Rap-A-Lot; Format: CD, digital download | | | |

=== Compilation albums ===
| Year | Album |
|---|---|
| 2003 | Greatest Hits: Released: December 9, 2003; Label: Rap-A-Lot |

=== Mixtapes ===
- Trunk Music Mixtape (2010)

=== Solo projects ===
- Belo Zero - The Truth (2006)
- A.K. & Layzie Bone - Finally (2007)
- Belo Zero - I Plead the 5th (2013)

== Extended plays ==
- Withdrawal with Twista (2015)

== Singles ==
| Year | Single | Chart positions | | | Album |
| Year | Single | U.S. Hot 100 | U.S. R&B | U.S. Rap | Album |
|---|---|---|---|---|---|
| 1996 | "Po Pimp" | 22 | 15 | 1 | Picture This |
| 1998 | "Still Po Pimpin" | 62 | 44 | 14 | Headz or Tailz |

== Guest appearances ==
List of non-single guest appearances, with other performing artists, showing year released and album name
| Title | Year | Other artist(s) | Album |
|---|---|---|---|
| "Somethin' to Ride To" | 1997 | 5th Ward Boyz, Johnny P | Usual Suspects |
| "Falling" | 1998 | Yukmouth | Thugged Out: The Albulation |
| "Yo Body" | 2009 | Twista, Johnny P | Category F5 |
| "Take It Off" | 2012 | Yung Berg, DJ MoonDawg | Chicago Redemption |
| "Choppaz in my Lap" | 2012 | Twista | Reloaded |
| "The Liquor" | 2012 | Willie Taylor, Crucial Conflict | The Reintroduction Of Willie Taylor |
| "Highway" | 2013 | Berner | Drugstore Cowboy |
| "Ride" | 2025 | Chance the Rapper | Star Line |
