= James Prince =

American music executive, promoter and manager

J. Prince
- Also known as: Lil J
- Born: James Andre Smith; October 31, 1964 (age 61); Houston, Texas, U.S.
- Genres: Southern hip-hop
- Occupations: Record executive; talent manager; music promoter
- Years active: 1986–present
- Label: Rap-A-Lot

James Andre Prince (né Smith; born October 31, 1964) is an American record executive, music promoter and talent manager. He co-founded the Houston-based record label Rap-A-Lot Records in 1986, which has signed acts including the Geto Boys, Do or Die, UGK, Scarface, Bun B and Pimp C, Devin the Dude, Z-Ro, and Trae tha Truth. Smith and his son Jas are also known as early career mentors of Canadian rapper Drake, having introduced him to Lil Wayne and leading him to sign with latter's Young Money Entertainment in 2009.

Prince has executive produced albums for the Geto Boys (Grip It! On That Other Level, We Can't Be Stopped, Till Death Do Us Part, The Resurrection), Scarface (Mr. Scarface Is Back, The World Is Yours, The Diary, The Untouchable, My Homies, The Last of a Dying Breed), Big Mike (Somethin' Serious), Do or Die (Picture This, Headz or Tailz), Yukmouth (Thugged Out: The Albulation), Bun B (Trill), Pimp C (Pimpalation), and Drake (Thank Me Later, Nothing Was the Same).

Prince has also managed professional boxers such as Floyd Mayweather Jr., Andre Ward, and Shakur Stevenson.

== Early life ==
Prince was born to 16 year old mother Sharon Johnson with an older sister Zenia and younger half-brother Thelton. They grew up in apartments in Fifth Ward, Houston, an area locally nicknamed the "Bloody Nickel" and known for cocaine use and poverty. To earn money, he mowed lawns in Shady Acres, played craps, sold stolen cannabis plants, and worked on welding trucks.

His sister died from getting hit by a train while walking home from school. Amongst other turbulence, friends and family were going to jail while Prince was rotating from school to school and between different homes. He played football at Kashmere High School, from which he graduated in 1982.

== Career ==
Prince was working as a bank teller in 1985 in the fault department, then getting laid off at the age of 20. The initial goal prior to the label was to keep his younger stepbrother known as the rapper Sir Rap-A-Lot out of street life, as well as friends Raheem and Jukebox from skipping school. They would meet on the porch of his grandmothers house to perform and practice. After purchasing an abandoned building, he turned the property into a used car dealership, known as Smith Auto Sales on the west side of Houston. At first he sold bucket cars, then moving on to exotic cars which athletes would come and purchase. The same rundown two-story building that Prince owned, was where the artists then moved on to record into during 1986.

Prince co-founded Rap-A-Lot Records with Cliff Blodget, a Seattleite, in 1987. Blodget was a computer science major, who was an electrical engineer by trade and acted as the label's in-house engineer and producer alongside fellow producer Carl Stephenson. Prince used his last bit of funds to invest into the label. He was inspired by Russell Simmons and the label he co-founded Def Jam Recordings. He moved the company in 1988 to New York City with Blodget. Around this time Lyor Cohen would show Prince check books of Def Jam artists LL Cool J and Whodini which showed him the potential revenue to be made in the music industry enlightening him to continue his vision with the Geto Boys moving the whole label back to Houston.

The first group he formed in the label was the Geto Boys. Prince found members Bushwick Bill when he was performing as a dancer at a club, Willie D through the recommendation of his barber, and Scarface in the parking lot of a club he owned playing demos to a DJ who worked there. His brother was a member but then was replaced at Prince's discretion with Scarface. This was confirmed from a freestyle battle against each other where Scarface outperformed Sir Rap-A-Lot, with the younger brother then agreeing that was the better direction for the group also. Using local radio stations like KTSU to spread the reach of the label's music, his first deal came in 1989 via Rick Rubin working with the Geto Boys on their 2nd album Grip It! On That Other Level.

Geffen Records who had been working with Rubin pulled the project a week before its release to the lyrical nature of the album, despite claims of racism and hypocrisy made by the Geto Boys and the fact that independently the album already had sold over 500,000 copies. The controversy lead to Rubin splitting from Geffen and signing with Warner Records with the album being pushed there instead, it tripled the total sales of the project.

Prior to the success of Ice Ice Baby, Prince wanted to sign rapper Vanilla Ice after seeing him perform in 1990 at The Summit. He did not follow through as a result of his business partner Blodget feeling that the artist lacked talent.

Prince signed a deal with Priority Records in 1991 for distribution, releasing the Geto Boys third album We Can't Be Stopped. By the mid-1990s co-founder Blodget had parted ways from Rap-A-Lot. In 1995 Prince signed the next distribution deal with Noo Trybe Records and Virgin Records.

In the 1990s Prince executively produced the Geto Boys' We Can't Be Stopped and Scarface's Mr. Scarface Is Back in 1991, Geto Boys' Till Death Do Us Part and Scarface's The World Is Yours in 1993, Big Mike's Somethin' Serious and Scarface's The Diary in 1994, Do or Die's Picture This and the Geto Boys' The Resurrection in 1996, Scarface's The Untouchable album in 1997, and Do or Die's Headz or Tailz and Scarface's My Homies and Yukmouth's Thugged Out: The Albulation in 1998.

During the 1990s, two DEA agents placed a probe on Prince and his label, believing the label was a front for a major trafficking network. At this time a concept for a music distribution label that would have acted dually as a union for recording artists was being planned between Prince, Suge Knight, and Irv Gotti which was eventually cancelled. The two agents were later convicted of corrupt conduct.

While the East Coast–West Coast hip hop rivalry was going on, Prince had suggested out of concern that The Notorious B.I.G. and manager Puff Daddy leave Los Angeles for their safety, weeks before the 1997 murder of the rapper.

In the 2000s Prince executively produced Scarface's The Last of a Dying Breed in 2000, Trill by Bun B in 2005, and Pimpalation by Pimp C in 2006.

During Destiny's Child formative years in the early 1990s, Prince was approached by Mathew Knowles and one of their managers asking if he would join in, but he declined as their sound did not match his more hip-hop oriented label. Decades later another opportunity came to his 19-year-old son Jas who had reached out to Lil Wayne and Bun B, alerting him of the singer Drake after finding him on Myspace, suggesting they collaborate together which lead to a label deal with Lil Wayne and features with Bun B on the albums So Far Gone and Trill OG. Jas and Prince Sr. were listed as executive producers or contributors for points on Drake's Thank Me Later, Nothing Was the Same, and other follow up projects as a result of the introduction, as well as entitlement to 33% of his earnings.

On February 13, 2015, Prince uploaded a spoken word diss track entitled Courtesy Call as a response to Sean Combs for a conflict he had involving Young Money artist Drake.

In 2018 Prince released his autobiography The Art & Science of Respect: A Memoir with a foreword written by Drake. In the spring of 2018 after the release of The Story of Adidon, Prince advised Drake not to respond to Pusha T helping deescalate the issue between the two parties.

In 2021 Prince helped revive Drake and Kanye West's relationship with the goal of all three coming together to help Larry Hoover by raising awareness on incarceration in the United States. They threw a benefit concert in December 2021 with support for judicial reform advocacy groups. The concert was at the Los Angeles Memorial Coliseum and produced by DONDA and PHNTM. It was played in select IMAX theatres, including Grauman's Chinese Theatre, while being streamed on Amazon's Music and Prime Video services.

In March 2022 Prince boycotted the Grammy Awards over Kanye West having been banned from attending.

In November 2022, after the death of rapper Takeoff in Houston, Prince issued condolences and set up a memorial at the site of the incident.

=== Boxing ===
Prince was an avid fan of boxing growing up, being an amateur fighter and a fan of promoter Don King. He became a manager for boxers as a way to get into that industry. He opened a boxing gym in Fifth Ward, Houston around 1999 known as JPrince Boxing which later became part of the multi-million dollar Prince Boxing Complex, under the umbrella of Prince Boxing Enterprises. Prince had the intention of meeting Mike Tyson in Las Vegas to manage the boxer, he was instead approached by Floyd Mayweather Jr. who was also a fan of his label. After being ignored by Tyson, Prince decided to go with managing Mayweather. They settled on a 20% deal which was 10% higher than the management deal he had with his father Floyd Mayweather Sr. supervising, as well as the potential opportunity to start a rap career over at his record label. The management relationship ended in 2003 due to financial differences between the two.

Prince managed Andre Ward after the 2004 Summer Olympics, in 2002 Prince called Ward after hearing he was about to quit boxing due to the passing of his father but convinced him to continue his career. They split ways in 2008 due to financial issues also, with each filing a lawsuit with each other over the matter in 2008. Prince and Ward began managing Shakur Stevenson together in 2016.

Prince has supervised the careers of 15 other boxers, leading some of them to their biggest victories, including Winky Wright, Jared Anderson, Roy Jones Jr., Diego Corrales, Mark Johnson, Duke Ragan, Efe Ajagba and Hasim Rahman.

=== Other ventures ===
In 2006 Prince founded condom company Strapped, after a close friend contracted HIV drastically going from 300 pounds to 75 pounds, dying afterwards. He had the idea for the company since 2002. The company primarily served the Houston area, educating youth about HIV/AIDS prevention and hosting events set up to address the issue of AIDS in the Black community, and has been represented by artists like Lil Wayne.

For over two decades Prince has operated a 1200-acre ranch for raising black angus cattle and hay.

In 2020 he launched Loyalty, a liquor and wine brand.

== Philanthropy ==
In January 2007, Houston Mayor Bill White and the City Council honored Prince for over 20 years of commitment and dedication to the city. The result of the proclamation named an official James Prince Day in Houston. The recognition came after a recreation center Prince built in Houston's 5th Ward. The facility has since been used to host events relating to Christmas, Thanksgiving, and back to school events.

In 2007 his condom company Strapped gave over 7,500 free HIV tests for people aged 18–24 at the Hip-Hop 4 HIV concert at Reliant Stadium.

In December 2007 Prince donated $100,000 to Bread of Life's Meals that Heal program in Houston.

== Legacy ==
Prince is known as one of the 'godfathers of the rap music industry', and inspired other southern hip hop label executives including Birdman of Cash Money Records and Master P of No Limit Records.

In June 2010, J Prince was honored alongside Master P, Jermaine Dupri, Timbaland, and Slick Rick at the VH1 7th annual Hip Hop Honors Awards for both his creative contributions and his philanthropic ventures.

In 2011, a limited edition DVD box set was released by Rap-A-Lot with appearances from several rappers, including Rick Ross and Young Jeezy and industry execs such as Lyor Cohen, Russell Simmons among several others praising Prince.

In 2019 Prince received an honorary doctorate degree in the form of a doctorate of humane letters from Texas Southern University. This was received in part to his commitment at the university giving guest lectures to students, offering Rap-A-Lot internships, and endowed scholarships to their students in need of financial assistance.

== Personal life ==
Prince has 7 children, including 3 sons, J Prince Jr., Jas, and Jay "Baby Jay" who also work in the music and boxing industries. He has been married to his wife since the late 1980s.

Prince Sr. is a practicing Christian. Prince has an island in Belize known as the Prince Island.

At the age of 23, he purchased a house for his mother and a 30 acre ranch.

== Discography ==
Compilation albums

- J Prince Presents R.N.D.S. (1999)

Executively produced albums

=== 1980s ===
- Geto Boys - Making Trouble (1988)
- Geto Boys - Grip It! On That Other Level (1989)

=== 1990s ===
- Geto Boys - The Geto Boys (1990)
- Convicts - Convicts (1991)
- Geto Boys - We Can't Be Stopped (1991)
- O.G. Style - I Know How to Play 'Em (1991)
- Scarface - Mr. Scarface Is Back (1991)
- Big Mello - Bone Hard Zaggin (1992)
- Ganksta N-I-P - The South Park Psycho (1992)
- Seagram - The Dark Roads (1992)
- DMG - Rigormortiz (1993)
- Geto Boys - Till Death Do Us Part (1993)
- Ganksta N-I-P - Psychic Thoughts (1993)
- Scarface - The World Is Yours (1993)
- 5th Ward Boyz - Ghetto Dope (1993)
- Big Mello - Wegonefunkwichamind (1994)
- Big Mike - Somethin' Serious (1994)
- Blac Monks - Secrets of the Hidden Temple (1994)
- Odd Squad - Fadanuf Fa Erybody!! (1994)
- Scarface - The Diary (1994)
- Seagram - Reality Check (1994)
- 5th Ward Boyz - Gangsta Funk (1994)
- CJ Mac - True Game (1995)
- Menace Clan - Da Hood (1995)
- 5th Ward Boyz - Rated G (1995)
- 5th Ward Juvenilez - Deadly Groundz (1995)
- Do or Die - Picture This (1996)
- Facemob - The Other Side of the Law (1996)
- Geto Boys - The Resurrection (1996)
- Mr. 3-2 - The Wicked Buddah Baby (1996)
- The Almighty RSO - Doomsday: Forever RSO (1996)
- Big Mike - Still Serious (1997)
- Ghetto Twiinz - In That Water (1997)
- Scarface - The Untouchable (1997)
- Seagram - Souls on Ice (1997)
- 5th Ward Boyz - Usual Suspects (1997)
- Blac Monks - No Mercy (1998)
- Devin the Dude - The Dude (1998)
- Do or Die - Headz or Tailz (1998)
- Ganksta N-I-P - Interview with a Killa (1998)
- Geto Boys - Da Good da Bad & da Ugly (1998)
- Yukmouth - Thugged Out: The Albulation (1998)
- Ghetto Twiinz - No Pain No Gain (1998)
- Scarface - My Homies (1998)
- Tela - Now or Never (1998)
- Big Mike - Hard to Hit (1999)
- 5th Ward Boyz - Keep It Poppin' (1999)

=== 2000s ===
- Do or Die - Victory (2000)
- Scarface - The Last of a Dying Breed (2000)
- Tela - The World Ain't Enuff (2000)
- Willie D - Loved by Few, Hated by Many (2000)
- Ghetto Twiinz - Got It on My Mind (2001)
- Snypaz - Livin' in the Scope (2001)
- Yukmouth - Thug Lord: The New Testament (2001)
- Devin the Dude - Just Tryin' ta Live (2002)
- Do or Die - Back 2 the Game (2002)
- Facemob - Silence (2002)
- Outlawz - Neva Surrenda (2002)
- Scarface - The Fix (2002)
- Tela - Double Dose (2002)
- Do or Die - Pimpin' Ain't Dead (2003)
- Scarface - Balls and My Word (2003)
- Yukmouth - Godzilla (2003)
- Devin the Dude - To tha X-Treme (2004)
- UTP - Noila Clap (2004)
- UTP - The Beginning of the End (2004)
- Z-Ro - The Life of Joseph W. McVey (2004)
- Bun B - Trill (2005)
- Dirty - Hood Stories (2005)
- Geto Boys - The Foundation (2005)
- Pimp C - Sweet James Jones Stories (2005)
- Z-Ro - Let the Truth Be Told (2005)
- Do or Die - Get That Paper (2006)
- Pimp C - Pimpalation (2006)
- Scarface - My Homies Part 2 (2006)
- Trae tha Truth - Restless (2006)
- UTP - Back Like We Left Something (2006)
- Z-Ro - I'm Still Livin' (2006)
- Devin the Dude - Waitin' to Inhale (2007)
- Scarface - Made (2007)
- Trae - Life Goes On (2007)
- UGK - Underground Kingz (2007)
- Z-Ro - King of tha Ghetto: Power (2007)
- Bun B - II Trill (2008)
- Pimp C - Greatest Hits (2008)
- Scarface - Emeritus (2008)
- Trae - The Beginning (2008)
- Yukmouth - Million Dollar Mouthpiece (2008)
- Z-Ro - Crack (2008)
- UGK - UGK 4 Life (2009)
- Z-Ro - Cocaine (2009)

=== 2010s ===
- Bun B - Trill OG (2010)
- Drake - Thank Me Later (2010)
- Pimp C - The Naked Soul of Sweet Jones (2010)
- Z-Ro - Heroin (2010)
- Pimp C - Still Pimping (2011)
- Juvenile - Rejuvenation (2012)
- Bun B - Trill OG: The Epilogue (2013)
- Drake - Nothing Was the Same (2013)
- Juvenile - The Fundamentals (2014)
