= Hurt-M-Badd production discography =

The following is a production discography of American singer and record producer Tyrone "Hurt-M-Badd" Wrice. It includes a list of songs produced, co-produced and remixed by year, title, artist and album.

== Production credits ==
List of songs produced and/or co-produced, with other performing artists, showing year released and album name
Year	Song	Artist	Album	Notes
1996	"Hail Mary"	Makaveli, Kastro, Young Noble, Prince Ital Joe	The Don Killuminati: The 7 Day Theory	N/A
1996	"Blasphemy"	Makaveli	The Don Killuminati: The 7 Day Theory	N/A
1996	"Just Like Daddy"	Makaveli	The Don Killuminati: The 7 Day Theory	N/A
1996	"Me and My Girlfriend"	Makaveli	The Don Killuminati: The 7 Day Theory	prod. w/ Darryl "Big D" Harper & Makaveli
1996	"Hold Ya Head"	Makaveli	The Don Killuminati: The 7 Day Theory	N/A
1996	"Against All Odds"	Makaveli	The Don Killuminati: The 7 Day Theory	N/A
1997	"Raw Deal"	The Lady of Rage	Necessary Roughness	co-prod.; prod. by Daz Dillinger
1997	"Starin' Through My Rear View"	Outlawz	Gang Related – The Soundtrack	co-prod.; prod. by 2Pac
1998	"Street Game"	Scarface, Willie D	Da Good da Bad & da Ugly	N/A
1999	"Pussy in the Click"	Willie D	J Prince Presents R.N.D.S. and Loved by Few, Hated by Many	N/A
1999	"Black Jesuz"	2Pac, Kadafi, Storm, Val Young, Young Noble, Kastro	Still I Rise	vocal prod.; prod. by 2Pac, L Rock Ya & Mr. Lee
2000	"If I Was White"	Willie D	Loved by Few, Hated by Many	N/A
2000	"She Likes 2 Ball"	Willie D	Loved by Few, Hated by Many	N/A
2001	"Fuckin' wit the Wrong Nigga"	2Pac	Until the End of Time	N/A
2001	"Kill-Steal-Will"	Snypaz	Livin' in the Scope	N/A
2001	"Playa Like Me"	Snypaz	Livin' in the Scope	N/A
2002	"Fame"	2Pac, Kadafi, Kastro, Napoleon, Young Noble	Better Dayz	N/A
2013	"RG3" (Bonus)	Hussein Fatal	The Interview: It's Not a Gimmik 2 Me	N/A

== Remixes ==
Year	Song	Artist	Album	Notes
1997	"Mild Funkshun" (The Remix)	Villain, Melinda Santiago	Whut Tha Lick Iz?	N/A
