= Get That Paper =

Get That Paper may refer to:

- Get That Paper (Do or Die album), 2006
- Get That Paper (Daz Dillinger and Fratthouse album), 2009
