= Livin' in the Scope =

Studio album by Snypaz
- Released: May 22, 2001
- Recorded: 2000–2001
- Studios: Hippie House Studios (Houston, TX); Holman Sound Design (Houston, TX); Medicine Man Recording Studio (Chicago, IL); CRC
- Genre: Gangsta rap
- Length: 1:00:36
- Labels: Rap-A-Lot; Virgin
- Producers: J. Prince (exec.); 7 Aurelius; Domo; Hurt-M-Badd; L.A.; Mike Dean; Mr. Lee; The Legendary Traxster

Snypaz chronology
My Life as a Snypa (1997)	Livin' in the Scope (2001)	Snypaz (2002)

Professional ratings
Review scores
Source	Rating
AllMusic	3/5 stars

Livin' in the Scope is the second studio album by American Chicago-based hip hop group Snypaz. It was released on May 22, 2001, via Rap-A-Lot Records. Production was handled by L.A., Channel 7, Hurt-M-Badd, Mike Dean, Mr. Lee, Domo and The Legendary Traxster, with J. Prince serving as executive producer. It features guest appearances from AK-47 of Do Or Die and The Regime. The album peaked at No. 174 on the Billboard 200, No. 41 on the Top R&B/Hip-Hop Albums and No. 8 on the Heatseekers Albums in the United States.

== Track listing ==
No.	Title	Writer(s)	Producer(s)	Length
1.	"Intro"	Charles Paxton; Iren Moore; Tyrone Wrice		0:56
2.	"U Don't Wanna Blaze"	Paxton; Moore; Robert Flynn; Dewayne Warren; Leroy Williams	Mr. Lee	4:13
3.	"Roll Wit Thugs" (featuring AK-47)	Paxton; Moore; Dennis Round; Marcus Vest; Tyrin Turner	7 Aurelius	4:01
4.	"Comin' Wit It"	Paxton; Flynn; Lemoyne Smith	L.A.	4:44
5.	"Kill-Steal-Will"	Paxton; Moore; Wrice	Hurt-M-Badd	3:04
6.	"Dollar Bill" (featuring The Regime)	Paxton; Moore; Keith Walker; Late Bankoudagba; Jerold Ellis; Michael Poye; George David Weiss; Hugo Peretti; Luigi Creatore	Domo	4:16
7.	"That's on Everythang" (featuring AK-47)	Paxton; Moore; Round; Vest; Turner	7 Aurelius	4:22
8.	"Playa Like Me"	Paxton; Moore; Wrice	Hurt-M-Badd	3:59
9.	"We Do"	Paxton; Moore; Flynn; Warren; Smith	L.A.	5:47
10.	"Tear da Roof Off"	Paxton; Moore; Smith	L.A.	4:01
11.	"Searchin'"	Paxton; Moore; Flynn; Warren; Samuel Lindley	The Legendary Traxster	4:32
12.	"Thorough"	Paxton; Williams	Mr. Lee	4:42
13.	"Juke It"	Paxton; Moore; Flynn; Warren; Smith	L.A.	4:35
14.	"Hot Onez"	Paxton; Moore; Flynn; Warren; Michael Dean	Mike Dean	4:15
15.	"Kamakazi" (Skit)	Paxton; Moore; Flynn; Warren; Dean		0:28
16.	"Kamakazi"	Paxton; Moore; Flynn; Warren; Dean	Mike Dean	2:41
Total length:				1:00:36

== Charts ==
Chart (2001)	Peak position
US Billboard 200	174
US Top R&B/Hip-Hop Albums (Billboard)	41
US Heatseekers Albums (Billboard)	8
