= Still Po Pimpin' =

"Still Po Pimpin"

Single by Do or Die featuring Twista and Johnny P.

from the album Headz or Tailz
- Released: March 10, 1998
- Recorded: 1997
- Genre: Hip hop
- Length: 4:00
- Label: Rap-a-Lot
- Songwriter: Do or Die
- Producer: The Legendary Traxster

Do or Die singles chronology
"Po Pimp" (1996)	"Still Po Pimpin" (1998)

"Still Po Pimpin" is the lead single from American hip hop group Do or Die’s second studio album, Headz or Tailz.

A "sequel" to the group's highly successful 1996 single "Po Pimp" and like "Po Pimp", "Still Po Pimpin" was produced by The Legendary Traxster and featured a guest verse from Twista and a chorus from R&B singer Johnny P. The song became a minor hit, peaking at No. 62 on the Billboard Hot 100, as well as reaching both the R&B and rap charts and to date is the group's final single to reach any of the three charts. The song also appeared on the group's 2003 compilation Greatest Hits.

== Single track listing ==
=== A-Side ===
1. "Still Pimpin'" (Full Mix)
2. "Still Pimpin'" (Clean Mix)

=== B-Side ===
1. "Still Pimpin'" (Mike Dean Remix)
2. "Still Pimpin'" (Instrumental)

== Charts ==
Chart (1998)	Peak position
Billboard Hot 100	62
Billboard Hot R&B/Hip-Hop Singles & Tracks	44
Billboard Hot Rap Singles	16
