= Wetter (song) =

Single by Twista featuring Erika Shevon

from the album Category F5
- Released: February 24, 2009
- Genre: Dirty rap; pop-rap
- Length: 4:11
- Label: Get Money Ganf; Capitol; EMI
- Songwriters: S. Lindley; E. Lockhart; C. Mitchell; Q. Saffold
- Producer: The Legendary Traxster

Twista singles chronology
"Cuddy Buddy" (2008)	"Wetter" (2009)	"Smile" (2009)

Erika Shevon singles chronology
"Wetter" (2009)

"Wetter" is a song by American rapper Twista off his seventh album Category F5 and released as the first single. The song features the singer Erika Shevon, and was produced by The Legendary Traxster. It is sometimes referred to as the second part of the song "Get It Wet" from his 1997 album Adrenaline Rush due to its similarities. It was released as a digital download on February 24, 2009. The radio version is remixed. The song contains elements from Janet Jackson's 1994 hit "Any Time, Any Place". It is a straightforward slow jam, with Shevon's vocal chorus punctuating Twista's two verses. The 'calling you daddy' section serves as both an intro and an outro. There is a freestyle by Lil Wayne & Shanell called "Wayne On Me" from Wayne's 2009 mixtape No Ceilings. This song is Twista's highest-charting single since Girl Tonite (2005).

Beyoncé's R&B remix of "Cuff It" (2022) featured Twista's original "Wetter" as a backing track, albeit with reproduced instrumentals. The remix was labelled "The Wetter Remix."

== Formats and track listing ==
Promo CD single

1. "Wetter" (Squeaky Clean Version) (featuring Erika Shevon) - 4:18
2. "Wetter" (Clean Version) (featuring Erika Shevon) - 4:18
3. "Wetter" (Explicit Version) (featuring Erika Shevon) - 4:18
4. "Wetter" (Instrumental) - 4:18
5. "Wetter" (Acapella) (featuring Erika Shevon) - 4:16

Digital single

1. "Wetter" (featuring Erika Shevon) - 4:16
2. "Wetter" (Radio Version) (featuring Erika Shevon) - 4:16
3. "Wetter" (Instrumental Version) (featuring Erika Shevon) - 4:16

== Charts ==
=== Weekly charts ===
Chart (2009)	Peak position
U.S. Billboard Hot 100	44
U.S. Billboard Hot R&B/Hip-Hop Songs	7
U.S. Billboard Hot Rap Songs	3

=== Year-end charts ===
Chart (2009)	Position
US Hot R&B/Hip-Hop Songs (Billboard)	42

=== Certifications ===
Region	Certification	Certified units/sales
United States (RIAA)	Gold	500,000^{^}
^{^} Shipments figures based on certification alone.
