= In a Minute =

In a Minute may refer to:

- In a Minute Records
- "In a Minute", a 2003 song by Do or Die from Pimpin' Ain't Dead
- "In a Minute", a 2018 song by Poppy from Am I a Girl?
- "In a Minute / In House", a 2016 song by DRAM from Big Baby DRAM
- "In a Minute" (song), a 2022 song by Lil Baby
