= Adrenaline Rush (album) =

Studio album by Twista
- Released: June 24, 1997
- Recorded: 1995–1997
- Genres: Hip hop; midwest rap; mafioso rap
- Length: 55:31
- Labels: Creator's Way; Big Beat; Atlantic
- Producer: The Legendary Traxster

Twista chronology
Runnin' Off at da Mouth (1992)	Adrenaline Rush (1997)	Mobstability (1998)

Singles from Adrenaline Rush
- 1. "Emotions" Released: April 8, 1997; 2. "Get It Wet" Released: October 7, 1997

Professional ratings
Review scores
Source	Rating
AllMusic	3/5 stars
RapReviews	7.5/10
The Source	3/5 stars
Vibe	(favorable)

Adrenaline Rush is the second studio album by Chicago rapper Twista, released on June 24, 1997. It was his second album nationally released, after his previous effort Resurrection was shelved outside of Chicago. The album had guest artists: Johnny P, Liffy Stokes, Miss Kane, Malif, Mayz and Turtle Banks. The first single off the album was "Emotions", a song which reworked the chorus of the Do or Die hit "Po Pimp" (on which Twista was featured). The single "Get It Wet" charted on the Billboard Hot 100 at number 96. With very little airplay or radio play outside the midwest, the album was certified platinum by the Recording Industry Association of America (RIAA) on July 15, 2019.

A sequel to the album, Adrenaline Rush 2007, was released in 2007 on Atlantic Records.

== Track listing ==
- All tracks produced by The Legendary Traxster

No.	Title	Length
1.	"Intro"	2:04
2.	"Adrenaline Rush" (featuring Buk of Psychodrama)	3:43
3.	"Death Before Dishonor"	4:24
4.	"It Feels So Good"	6:08
5.	"Overdose"	4:16
6.	"Mobster's Anthem" (featuring Liffy Stokes & Mayz)	5:05
7.	"Get Her in tha Mood" (Skit)	1:29
8.	"Emotions" (featuring Johnny P)	4:32
9.	"Unsolved Mystery"	4:44
10.	"Korrupt World" (featuring B-Hype)	5:44
11.	"Get It Wet" (featuring Ms Kane aka Eryka Kane)	4:04
12.	"No Remorse" (featuring Liffy Stokes, B-Hype, Turtle Banks, Mayze, and Master Link of Qualo)	4:32
13.	"Emotions (Remix)"	4:49

== Charts ==
=== Weekly charts ===
Chart (1997)	Peak position
US Billboard 200	77
US Top R&B/Hip-Hop Albums (Billboard)	13

=== Year-end charts ===
Chart (1997)	Position
US Top R&B/Hip-Hop Albums (Billboard)	84

== Singles ==
Year	Song	Chart positions		
Year	Song	US Hot 100	US R&B	US Rap
1997	"Emotions"	101	50	11
1997	"Get It Wet"	96	62	12

== Certifications ==
Region	Certification	Certified units/sales
United States (RIAA)	Platinum	1,000,000^{‡}
^{‡} Sales+streaming figures based on certification alone.
