= Victory (Do or Die album) =

Studio album by Do or Die
- Released: March 14, 2000
- Recorded: 1999–2000
- Studios: Hippie House (Houston, TX); Knock Hard (Houston, TX); Sound on Sound (New York, NY); Soundtrack (New York, NY); Creator's Way (Chicago, IL); Darkside (Chicago, IL); Right Track (Los Angeles, CA); Enterprise (Burbank, CA)
- Genre: Hip hop
- Length: 1:04:38
- Labels: Rap-A-Lot; Virgin
- Producers: A.K. 47; Day Rock; Irv Gotti; J.B. Money; Mike Dean; Mike Dunn; Mr. Lee; the Legendary Traxster

Do or Die chronology
Headz or Tailz (1998)	Victory (2000)	Back 2 the Game (2002)

Singles from Victory
- 1. "Can U Make It Hot" Released: August 1, 2000

Victory is the third studio album by American hip hop group Do or Die. It was released on March 14, 2000, via Rap-A-Lot Records. The recording sessions took place at Hippie House Studios and Knock Hard Studio in Houston, at Sound On Sound and Soundtrack Studios in New York, at Creator's Way Studios and Darkside Recordings in Chicago, at Right Track Studios in Los Angeles, and at Enterprise Studios in Burbank. The album was produced by Mr. Lee, Day Rock, Irv Gotti, JB Money, Mike Dean, Mike Dunn, the Legendary Traxster, and member A.K. It features guest appearances from Snypaz, Feloney, Hussein Fatal, Ja Rule, Johnny P., and Mo Unique. The album peaked at number 13 on the Billboard 200 and number 4 on the Top R&B/Hip-Hop Albums in the United States.

== Critical reception ==
Professional ratings
Review scores
Source	Rating
AllMusic	2.5/5 stars
The Encyclopedia of Popular Music	2/5 stars
RapReviews	6/10

AllMusic wrote that "Do or Die approach gangsta rap ideology with a quick-paced rapping style, a uplifting-soulful feel, and plenty of harmony." Vibe wrote that "the bubbling, slinky bass lines ... have been replaced by hyperactive bouncy beats with stuttering drum tracks and euphonic grooves." Rolling Stone thought that the "producer Mr. Lee provides agitated Cash Money-like beats that speed up the low-rider pace of the group's '96 signature hit, 'Po Pimp', but nothing makes this album stand out."

== Track listing ==
No.	Title	Producer(s)	Length
1.	"Victory"	Mr. Lee	3:05
2.	"If U Scared" (featuring Snypaz)	Mr. Lee; A.K. 47	3:35
3.	"In a Mode"	Mr. Lee; A.K. 47	4:02
4.	"Keep It Real" (featuring Johnny P.)	Day Rock; A.K. 47	4:04
5.	"Who Know?"	Mr. Lee	3:17
6.	"Bank Heist Interlude"		0:52
7.	"Tha Heist"	Mr. Lee; A.K. 47	2:48
8.	"La, La, La"	Mr. Lee	4:05
9.	"Can U Make It Hot" (featuring Mo Unique)	Day Rock; A.K. 47	4:47
10.	"V.I.P." (featuring Feloney)	Mike Dunn; A.K. 47	5:46
11.	"Bounce for Me"	Irv Gotti	3:21
12.	"If I Don't Eat"	The Legendary Traxster; A.K. 47	4:10
13.	"Stay Focused" (featuring Chilla)	Mr. Lee	3:50
14.	"Murders, Pimps + Thugs" (featuring Ja Rule)	Irv Gotti; J.B. Money	4:41
15.	"Ride" (featuring Hussein Fatal)	Mr. Lee	3:49
16.	"Thuggin' It Out" (featuring Outlawz)	Mr. Lee	4:05
17.	"Already Know" (featuring E-40)	Mike Dean; A.K. 47	4:21
Total length:			1:04:38

== Personnel ==
- Dennis "AK47" Round – vocals, producer (tracks: 2–4, 7, 9, 10, 12, 17)
- Anthony "N.A.R.D." Round – vocals
- Darnell "Belo Zero" Smith – vocals
- Charles "Chilla" Paxton – vocals (tracks: 2, 13)
- Iren "2-4" Moore – vocals (track 2)
- John "Johnny P" Pigram – vocals (track 4)
- Monique Moy – vocals (track 9)
- Feloney Davis – vocals (track 10)
- Jeffrey "Ja Rule" Atkins – vocals (track 14)
- Bruce "Hussein Fatal" Washington – vocals (track 15)
- Tony Redd – additional vocals (track 4)
- Casey Abernathy – additional vocals (track 9)
- Swing – additional vocals (track 10)
- Malcolm "E.D.I." Greenidge – additional vocals (track 16)
- Rufus "Young Noble" Cooper III – additional vocals (track 16)
- Earl "E-40" Stevens – additional vocals (track 17)
- Leroy "Mr. Lee" Williams Jr. – producer (tracks: 1–3, 5, 7, 8, 13, 15, 16), engineering
- Derek Wayne "Day Rock" Bass – producer (tracks: 4, 9)
- Mike Dunn – producer (track 10)
- Irving "Irv Gotti" Lorenzo – producer (tracks: 11, 14)
- Samuel "The Legendary Traxster" Lindley – producer (track 12), mixing
- Joe "J.B. Money" Bythewood – producer (track 14)
- Mike Dean – producer (track 17)
- Micah Harrison – engineering
- Mike Hengeli – engineering
- Ryan Smith – engineering
- Bryan Stanley – mixing
- Pat Viala – mixing
- Tom Coyne – mastering
- James A. Smith – executive producer
- Jeff Battson – artwork, design, layout
- Michael Benabib – photography
- Anzel "Red Boy" Jennings – A&R
- Tony "Big Chief" Randle – A&R
- Brian Leach – A&R
- Jesse Jones – A&R
- Ray Gregory – A&R

== Charts ==
Chart (2000)	Peak position
US Billboard 200	13
US Top R&B/Hip-Hop Albums (Billboard)	4
