= No Pain No Gain (album) =

Studio album by Ghetto Twiinz
- Released: September 22, 1998
- Recorded: 1997–98
- Studios: Hippie House Studios (Houston, Texas)
- Genre: Hardcore hip hop
- Label: Rap-A-Lot Records
- Producers: J. Prince; Leroy "Precise" Edwards; Mike Dean; Mr. Lee

Ghetto Twiinz chronology
In That Water (1997)	No Pain No Gain (1998)	Got It on My Mind (2001)

No Pain No Gain is the third studio album by American hip hop duo Ghetto Twiinz. It was released on September 22, 1998, through Rap-A-Lot Records. Recording sessions took place at Hippie House Studios in Houston, Texas. Production was handled by Mike Dean, Mr. Lee, and Leroy "Precise" Edwards, who is also served as executive producer together with J. Prince. It features guest appearances from 007, 2-4, DMG, D. Shype, G Mone', Gotti, Lo-Life, Mia X, Scarface, Tela, Willie D and Yukmouth. The album debuted at No. 191 on the Billboard 200, No. 35 on the Top R&B/Hip-Hop Albums and No. 15 on the Heatseekers Albums charts in the United States.

== Track listing ==
No.	Title	Writer(s)	Producer(s)	Length
1.	"War (Intro)"			1:30
2.	"Soldier Song" (featuring DMG and Yukmouth)	Tonya Jupiter; Trementhia Jupiter; Harold Armstrong; Jerold Ellis; Leroy Edwards; Michael George Dean	Leroy "Precise" Edwards	5:19
3.	"Die 'MF' Die" (featuring 007)	Tonya Jupiter; Trementhia Jupiter; Edwards		4:07
4.	"A Mil Don't Make U Real" (featuring C-Loc)	Tonya Jupiter; Trementhia Jupiter; S. Carrell; Edwards; Dean		4:32
5.	"No Sunshine" (featuring Scarface)	Tonya Jupiter; Trementhia Jupiter; Brad Jordan; Dean	Mike Dean	6:06
6.	"No Pain No Gain" (featuring Mia X)	Tonya Jupiter; Trementhia Jupiter; Mia Young; Edwards; Betty Wright	Leroy "Precise" Edwards	5:01
7.	"Smokin' Love"	Tonya Jupiter; Trementhia Jupiter; Edwards		4:08
8.	"Stop Playin'" (featuring Tela)	Tonya Jupiter; Trementhia Jupiter; Winston Rogers; Leroy Williams	Mr. Lee	5:20
9.	"Got It on My Mind"	Tonya Jupiter; Trementhia Jupiter; Edwards		3:33
10.	"You Don't Wanna (Go to War)" (featuring Lo Life and Willie D)			4:16
11.	"Gonna Be a Murda"	Tonya Jupiter; Trementhia Jupiter; Dean		3:44
12.	"B's Jack Too"	Tonya Jupiter; Trementhia Jupiter; Edwards		3:31
13.	"Bout Dat Gangsta Gangsta" (featuring 2-4 and G Mone)	Tonya Jupiter; Trementhia Jupiter; Iren Moore; Edwards; Dean		5:03
14.	"Livin' Ghetto" (featuring Willie D)			5:56
15.	"Responsibility (Remix)" (featuring D. Shype)	Tonya Jupiter; Trementhia Jupiter; Edwards		4:43
16.	"Small Time (Remix)" (featuring Gotti)	Tonya Jupiter; Trementhia Jupiter; Edwards; Dean; Williams		5:05
17.	"Ms. Ghetto News/War (Outro)"			1:48

Sample credits

- Track 6 contains a sample of "No Pain No Gain" written by Betty Wright

== Personnel ==
- Tonya Jupiter – vocals
- Trementhia Jupiter – vocals
- Harold "DMG" Armstrong – vocals (track 2)
- Jerold "Yukmouth" Ellis – vocals (track 2)
- Andre "007" Barnes – vocals (track 3)
- S. "C-Loc" Carrell – vocals (track 4)
- Brad "Scarface" Jordan – vocals (track 5)
- Mia "Mia X" Young – vocals (track 6)
- Winston "Tela" Rogers – vocals (track 8)
- Richard "Lo Life" Nash – vocals (track 10)
- William "Willie D" Dennis – vocals (tracks: 10, 14)
- Iren "2-4" Moore – vocals (track 13)
- Gary Paul "G Mone" Talley – vocals (track 13)
- D. Shype – vocals (track 15)
- J. "Gotti" Baker – vocals (track 16)
- Leroy "Precise" Edwards – producer, mixing, engineering, executive producer
- Mike Dean – producer, mixing, engineering, mastering
- Leroy "Mr. Lee" Williams – producer
- Micah Harrison – engineering
- James "J Prince" Smith – executive producer
- Anzel Jennings – coordinator
- Tony Randle – supervisor
- Pen & Pixel – artwork, design, photography
- Hid-E Us Design – artwork, design

== Charts ==
Chart (1998)	Peak position
US Billboard 200	191
US Top R&B/Hip-Hop Albums (Billboard)	35
US Heatseekers Albums (Billboard)	15
