= Deadly Groundz =

Studio album by 5th Ward Juvenilez
- Released: June 20, 1995
- Recorded: 1994–95
- Studios: Digital Services (Houston, Texas)
- Genre: Hip hop
- Labels: Underground; Rap-A-Lot
- Producers: J Prince (exec.); O.G. Dewey (also exec.); Crazy C; Derek "Grizz" Edwards; Mike Dean; N.O. Joe

5th Ward Juvenilez chronology
Deadly Groundz (1995)	Organized Crime (1998)

Singles from Deadly Groundz
- 1. "G-Groove" Released: May 2, 1995

Professional ratings
Review scores
Source	Rating
AllMusic	3/5 stars
The Source	3.5/5 stars

Deadly Groundz is the debut and only studio album by American hip hop group 5th Ward Juvenilez. It was released on June 20, 1995 through Underground/Rap-A-Lot Records. Recording sessions took place at Digital Services in Houston. Production was handled by Mike Dean, N.O. Joe, Crazy C, Derek "Grizz" Edwards, and O.G. Dewey, who was also serving as executive producer together with J. Prince. It features guest appearances from E-Rock, Kaos and 007.

The album reached number 200 on the Billboard 200 albums chart. It also peaked at number 28 on the Top R&B Albums and number 9 on the Heatseekers Albums. It spawned one single, "G-Groove", which sampled The Blackbyrds' "Mysterious Vybes".

In 1998, members Mr. Slimm and Nickelboy changed their rap names to Frank Nitti and Gotti and released a studio album Organized Crime as FWC (Fifth Ward Circle).

== Track listing ==
No.	Title	Writer(s)	Length
1.	"5th Ward Juvenilez"	Frank J. Robinson; Lloyd Owen Jones; Chris Johnson; Joseph Johnson	3:00
2.	"Gangsta N My Hood"	Robinson; Jones; Michael George Dean	3:45
3.	"G-Groove"	Robinson; Jones; Dean; Donald Byrd; Darlene Higgins	4:58
4.	"No Conscious"	Robinson; Jones; Derek Edwards	3:39
5.	"G-ing N tha Nickel"	Robinson; Jones; Edwards	4:29
6.	"Kar Phreak"	Robinson; Jones; C. Johnson; Simon P. Cullins; Dewey Forker; George Clinton	3:30
7.	"Mr. Slimm"	Robinson; Edwards	3:49
8.	"Deadly Groundz"	Robinson; Jones; C. Johnson; Edwards	4:29
9.	"Busta Azz Niggaz"	Robinson; Jones; C. Johnson; Cullins	5:25
10.	"Menace"	Robinson; Jones; C. Johnson; Dean	3:48
11.	"Bad Newz"	Jones; Cullins	4:47
12.	"Not 2 Young"	C. Johnson; Dean	3:05
13.	"Nut Check" (featuring E-Rock, Kaos & 007)	Robinson; Jones; Edwards	6:01
14.	"Ghetto Talez"	Robinson; Jones; Edwards	3:41
15.	"Gotsta Get Paid"	Robinson; Jones; C. Johnson; Dean; Forker	2:42

== Personnel ==
- Daddy Lo – main performer
- Frank "Mr. Slimm" Robinson – main performer
- Nickelboy – main performer
- Eric "E-Rock" Taylor – featured performer (track 13)
- Kaos – featured performer (track 13)
- Andre "007" Barnes – featured performer (track 13)
- Michael George Dean – producer, mixing, mastering, engineering
- "O.G. Dewey" Forker – producer, executive producer
- Derek "Grizz" Edwards – producer
- Simon "Crazy C" Cullins – producer
- Joseph "N.O. Joe" Johnson – producer
- John Marantz – mastering
- James A. Smith – executive producer

== Chart history ==
Chart (1995)	Peak position
US Billboard 200	200
US Top R&B Albums (Billboard)	28
US Heatseekers Albums (Billboard)	9
