= Emotions (Twista song) =

Single by Twista

from the album Adrenaline Rush
- Released: April 8, 1997
- Recorded: 1996
- Genre: Hip hop
- Length: 4:08
- Label: Atlantic
- Songwriters: Carl Mitchell; Samuel Lindley
- Producer: The Legendary Traxster

Twista singles chronology
"Po Pimp" (1996)	"Emotions" (1997)	"Get It Wet" (1997)

"Emotions" is the first single released from Twista's third album, Adrenaline Rush. After several unsuccessful singles from his previous albums, "Emotions" was Twista's first charting single, making it to both the R&B and Rap charts, while just narrowly missing the Billboard Hot 100, instead peaking at #1 Bubbling Under Hot 100 Singles (#101 on the US charts).

== Charts ==
Chart	Position
Billboard Hot 100	# 101
U.S. R&B / Hip-Hop	# 50
Hot Rap Singles	# 11
