= Surrounded by Criminals =

Studio album by Ghetto Twiinz
- Released: December 17, 1995
- Genre: Gangsta rap; Southern hip-hop
- Label: Big Boy Records
- Producer: Leroy "Precise" Edwards

Ghetto Twiinz chronology
Surrounded by Criminals (1995)	In That Water (1997)

Surrounded by Criminals is the debut album released by the Ghetto Twiinz. It was released on December 17, 1995, by Big Boy Records and featured music production by Leroy " Precise" Edwards with music instruments performed by David "D-Funk" Faulk. Charles "Big Boy" Temple was the executive producer. The album was mastered by Brian "Big Bass" Gardner. It found minor success, making it to #37 on the Top R&B/Hip-Hop Albums chart and #48 on the Top Heatseekers Billboard Charts. In March 1996

== Track listing ==
1. "Surrounded"-1:10
2. "Sho No Luv"- 4:12
3. "Let's Get This Shit STR-8"- 3:40
4. "So Hard to Say Goodbye"- 4:27
5. "Got It on My Mind"- 3:15
6. "Mamma's Hurtin'"- 4:20
7. "Die Nigga, Die"- 3:42
8. "I'ma Do U N"- 3:13
9. "Lil' Shorty"- 0:37
10. "Four Treats in One"- 3:13
11. "I Ain't Dyin', I Ain't Lyin'"- 4:51
12. "Mamma's Hurtin'" (Radio Edit)- 3:53
13. "Die Nigga, Die" (Chopped & Screwed)- 4:24
