= Mobstability =

Studio album by Twista and the Speedknot Mobstaz
- Released: October 6, 1998
- Recorded: 1997–1998
- Studio: Creator's Way Studios (Chicago)
- Genres: Hip hop; gangsta rap
- Length: 1:05:52
- Labels: Creator's Way; Big Beat; Atlantic
- Producers: Leroy Burton (exec.); The Legendary Traxster

Twista chronology
Adrenaline Rush (1997)	Mobstability (1998)	Kamikaze (2004)

Speedknot Mobstaz chronology
Mobstability (1998)	Mobstability II: Nation Business (2008)

Singles from Mobstability
- 1. "In Your World" Released: June 30, 1998

Professional ratings
Review scores
Source	Rating
AllMusic	3/5 stars
Encyclopedia of Popular Music	3/5 stars
The Source	4/5 stars

Mobstability is a collaborative studio album by American rapper Twista and fellow Chicago-based hip hop group the Speedknot Mobstaz. It was released on October 6, 1998 via Atlantic Records. Production was handled entirely by The Legendary Traxster, with Leroy Burton serving as executive producer. It features guest appearances from Christopher Williams, Danny Boy, NewSense and Shock The World. The album peaked at number 34 on the Billboard 200 and number 9 on the Top R&B/Hip-Hop Albums. Its lead single, "In Your World", peaked at No. 101 on the Billboard Hot 100 and appeared on the Dr. Dolittle: The Album soundtrack.

== Track listing ==
All lyrics are written by Carl Terrell Mitchell, Calvin Thomas and Jabari Bristow, except for track 2 written with Corinthia Federick; all music is composed by Samuel "The Legendary Traxster" Lindley.

No.	Title	Writer(s)	Length
1.	"Intro"	Carl Terrell Mitchell; Calvin Thomas; Jabari Bristow	0:44
2.	"Crook County" (featuring Newsense of Psychodrama)	Mitchell; Thomas; Bristow; Corinthia Federick; Samuel C. Lindley	3:48
3.	"Mob Up"	Mitchell; Thomas; Bristow	4:32
4.	"Front Porch" (featuring Danny Boy)	Mitchell; Thomas; Bristow; Lindley	5:17
5.	"In Your World" (featuring Christopher Williams)	Mitchell; Thomas; Bristow; Lindley	4:41
6.	"Legit Ballers"	Mitchell; Thomas; Bristow; Lindley	5:18
7.	"Mobstability"	Mitchell; Thomas; Bristow	5:06
8.	"Party Hoes"	Mitchell; Thomas; Bristow	4:35
9.	"Warm Embrace"	Mitchell; Thomas; Bristow	6:17
10.	"Smoke Wit You" (featuring Baby Boy)	Mitchell; Thomas; Bristow	4:25
11.	"Loyalty" (featuring Shock The World)	Mitchell; Thomas; Bristow; Lindley; Frederick Taylor	4:18
12.	"Motive 4 Murder"	Mitchell; Thomas; Bristow; Lindley	6:11
13.	"Dreams"	Mitchell; Thomas; Bristow	5:12
14.	"Rock Y'all Spot"	Mitchell; Thomas; Bristow	5:28
Total length:			1:05:52

== Personnel ==
- Carl "Twista" Mitchell – main artist
- Calvin "Liffy Stokes" Thomas – main artist
- Jabari "Mayz" Bristow – main artist
- Samuel "The Legendary Traxster" Lindley – producer, engineering, mixing
- Darnell "Cayex" Evans – engineering assistant
- Frederick "Toxic" Taylor – engineering assistant
- Brian "Big Bass" Gardner – mastering
- Leroy Burton – executive producer
- Victor Hall – art direction, photography
- Mike Caren – A&R
- Corinthia "Newsense" Federick – featured artist (track 2)
- "Danny Boy" Steward – featured artist (track 4)
- Troy Christopher Williams – featured artist (track 5)
- Shock The World – featured artist (track 11)
- Baby Boy – additional vocals (track 10)
- Vicky – additional vocals (track 13)

== Charts ==
Chart (1998)	Peak position
US Billboard 200	34
US Top R&B/Hip-Hop Albums (Billboard)	9
