= D.O.D. (album) =

D.O.D

Studio album by Do or Die
- Released: February 1, 2005
- Recorded: 2004
- Studios: The Legendary Traxster, Inc.; Pressure Point Studios (Chicago, IL); The Sound Villa; Record Plant (Los Angeles, CA); The Chocolate Factory (Chicago, IL); Chicago Recording Company (Chicago, IL); United Technique Recording (Chicago, IL); Ocean Way Recording (Los Angeles, CA)
- Genre: Hip hop
- Length: 1:05:56
- Labels: The Legion Records; Atlantic Records
- Producers: DJ Quik; J. R. Rotem; Kanye West; No I.D.; N.O. Joe; R. Kelly; Scott Storch; The Legendary Traxster; Toxic; Vudu; Wax Master Maurice

Do or Die chronology
Pimpin' Ain't Dead (2003)	D.O.D (2005)	Get That Paper (2006)

Singles from D.O.D
- 1. "Higher" Released: 2004; 2. "Magic Chick" Released: 2005

Professional ratings
Review scores
Source	Rating
AllMusic	3.5/5 stars
Pitchfork	6.3/10
PopMatters	6/10
RapReviews	7/10

D.O.D. is the sixth studio album by American hip hop group Do Or Die. It was released on February 1, 2005, via The Legion Records. Recording sessions took place at Pressure Point Studios, The Chocolate Factory, Chicago Recording Company and United Technique Recording in Chicago, at the Record Plant and Ocean Way Recording in Los Angeles, at The Legendary Traxster, Inc., and at The Sound Villa. Production was handled by The Legendary Traxster, Kanye West, DJ Quik, J. R. Rotem, No I.D., N.O. Joe, R. Kelly, Scott Storch, Toxic, Vudu and Wax Master Maurice, with Rudolph J. Acosta serving as executive producer. It features guest appearances from Kanye West, Johnny P, Bounty Killer, DJ Quik, Grind, Malik Yusef, Remy Ma, Ric Jilla, R. Kelly, Sasha, Shawnna, Syleena Johnson, the Legendary Traxster and Twista.

The album peaked at No. 40 on the Billboard 200 and No. 14 on the Top R&B/Hip-Hop Albums chart.

== Track listing ==
No.	Title	Producer(s)	Length
1.	"Against All Odds (Intro)"	The Legendary Traxster	1:03
2.	"Right Here"	N.O. Joe	2:47
3.	"Chain of Command"	The Legendary Traxster	4:22
4.	"Max Julien Interlude"		0:36
5.	"U Already Know" (featuring Remy Ma)	Scott Storch	3:58
6.	"Higher" (featuring Kanye West)	Kanye West	3:15
7.	"Max Julien Interlude"		0:22
8.	"Magic Chick" (featuring R. Kelly)	R. Kelly; Vudu	4:01
9.	"Nawty" (featuring Bounty Killer and Sasha)	N.O. Joe	3:30
10.	"Paid the Price" (featuring Kanye West)	Kanye West	3:41
11.	"If Only You Knew" (featuring Syleena Johnson and Twista)	Toxic	3:40
12.	"Holla at Your Boy"	Wax Master Maurice	3:57
13.	"Be Alright" (featuring Ric Jilla and Johnny P.)	No I.D.	4:27
14.	"Around Here" (featuring Malik Yusef)	The Legendary Traxster	5:29
15.	"Wa da da Dang" (featuring Grind)	The Legendary Traxster	4:01
16.	"Getcha Weight Up"	J. R. Rotem	3:46
17.	"For My Niggaz" (featuring The Legendary Traxster)	The Legendary Traxster	5:01
18.	"Max Julien Interlude"		0:53
19.	"Church" (featuring DJ Quik and Johnny P.)	DJ Quik	3:51
20.	"Higher (Remix)" (featuring Kanye West and Shawnna)	Kanye West	3:16
Total length:			1:05:56

Sample credits

- Tracks 6 and 20 contain samples from "You're My Latest, My Greatest Inspiration" written by Leon Huff and Kenneth Gamble as performed by Teddy Pendergrass
- Track 10 contains samples from "Go On Without You!" written by Larry Troutman and Roger Troutman as performed by Shirley Murdock
- Track 12 contains samples from "The Closer I Get to You" written by James Mtume and Reggie Lucas as performed by Donny Hathaway
- Track 13 contains samples from "Can't We Fall In Love" written by Peter Ivers and John Lewis Parker as performed by Phyllis Hyman

== Personnel ==
- Darnell "Belo Zero" Smith – vocals
- Dennis "AK47" Round – vocals
- Anthony "N.A.R.D." Round – vocals
- Reminisce "Remy Ma" Mackie – vocals (track 5)
- Kanye West – vocals & producer (tracks: 6, 10, 20)
- Robert Kelly – vocals & producer (track 8)
- Rodney "Bounty Killer" Price – vocals (track 9)
- Karen "Sasha" Chin – vocals (track 9)
- Syleena Johnson – vocals (track 11)
- Carl "Twista" Mitchell – vocals (track 11)
- Ric Jilla – vocals (track 13)
- John "Johnny P" Pigram – vocals (tracks: 13, 19)
- Malik Yusef El Shabazz Jones – vocals (track 14)
- Grind – vocals (track 15)
- Samuel "The Legendary Traxster" Lindley – vocals (track 17), producer (tracks: 1, 3, 14–17), engineering
- Paris Cole – backing vocals (track 17)
- David "DJ Quik" Blake – vocals & producer (track 19)
- Rashawnna "Shawnna" Guy – vocals (track 20)
- Singer's Singer's Ltd. – backing vocals (tracks: 6, 10, 20)
- Trevor "Kay-Tone" Caston – keyboards (tracks: 1, 15, 16)
- Neil Artwick – keyboards (track 14)
- Richie Davis – guitar (tracks: 14, 17)
- Anthony Glenn Brown – bass (track 17)
- Devonta – keyboards (track 19)
- Erick Todd Coomes – bass (track 19)
- Keenan "Keynote" Holloway – instruments (tracks: 6, 10, 20)
- Joseph "N.O. Joe" Johnson – producer (track 2)
- Scott Storch – producer (track 5)
- Matthew "DJ Vudu" McAllister – producer (track 8)
- Frederick "Toxic" Taylor – producer (track 11)
- Maurice "Waxmaster" Minor – producer (track 12)
- Ernest "No I.D." Wilson – producer (track 13)
- Dan Burns – engineering
- Eric Schlotzer – engineering
- Jeff Lane – engineering
- Jun Ishizeki – engineering
- Larry Sternum – engineering
- Wayne Allison – engineering
- Eddy Schreyer – mastering
- Rudolph J. Acosta – executive producer, A&R
- Benjamin Niles – design
- Vincent Soyez – photography

== Charts ==
Chart (2005)	Peak position
US Billboard 200	40
US Top R&B/Hip-Hop Albums (Billboard)	14
