= Get It Wet =

Single by Twista featuring Ms. Kane

from the album Adrenaline Rush
- Released: October 7, 1997
- Recorded: 1997
- Genre: Hip hop
- Length: 4:08
- Label: Atlantic
- Songwriters: Carl Mitchell; Samuel Lindley
- Producer: The Legendary Traxster

Twista singles chronology
"Emotions" (1997)	"Get It Wet" (1997)	"Slow Jamz" (2003)

"Get It Wet" is the second single released from Twista's third album, Adrenaline Rush. The song featured a verse from rapper, Ms. Kane and was produced by The Legendary Traxster. "Get It Wet" was Twista's entry on the Billboard Hot 100, peaking at 96.

== Single track listing ==
1. "Get It Wet" (Album Version)- 4:03
2. "Get It Wet" (Instrumental)- 4:04
3. "Mobster's Anthem" (Album Version)- 4:36
4. "Mobster's Anthem" (Instrumental)- 4:37

== Charts ==
Chart	Position
Billboard Hot 100	# 96
U.S. R&B / Hip-Hop	# 62
Hot Rap Singles	# 12
