= Category F5 =

Studio album by Twista
- Released: July 14, 2009
- Recorded: 2008–09
- Genre: Hip hop
- Length: 58:45
- Labels: GMG; EMI
- Producers: Carl Mitchell (exec.); Rawle Stewart (exec.); The Legendary Traxster; Toxic; John Gant; Tight Mike; Solo; Zaytoven; J. R. Rotem; Caution & Velly; Streetrunner; I.L.O.; GoodWill & MGI; Chad Beatz; Marlin Hookman; Kanye West; Boi Beatz; No I.D.

Twista chronology
Adrenaline Rush 2007 (2007)	Category F5 (2009)	The Perfect Storm (2010)

Singles from Category F5
- 1. "Wetter" Released: February 24, 2009; 2. "On Top" Released: 2009

Professional ratings
Review scores
Source	Rating
AllHipHop	(7/10)
Allmusic	3.5/5 stars
DJBooth	3.5/5 stars
HipHopDX	3.5/5 stars
PopMatters	3/10 stars
Prefix Magazine	(positive)
RapReviews	(7/10)
The Smoking Section	3.5/5 stars
USA Today	3/4 stars
XXL	3/5 stars

Category F5 is the sixth studio album by American rapper Twista. Its title is taken from the Fujita scale. The album marks the first collaboration with Chicago producer the Legendary Traxster since 2004's Kamikaze. The album was released on July 14, 2009. The album marked his debut with the label, following his departure from Atlantic Records. Originally scheduled to feature Kanye West, Akon, Busta Rhymes, Mr. Criminal, Tech N9ne, and Static Major, guest appearances were pared down as many of the recorded songs were leaked, including the song "Problems" featuring Tech N9ne, which was cut because of sample-clearance problems. The track "She Got It" (produced by Jim Jonsin & featuring Bobby Valentino) was cut because the track was not 100% ready. "All Right" (produced by Kanye West) was included on iTunes as a bonus track.

== Track listing ==
No.	Title	Writer(s)	Producer(s)	Length
1.	"Misunderstood" (featuring Buk)	Carl Mitchell; Samuel Lindley; Jeffery Robinson	The Legendary Traxster	5:03
2.	"American Gangsta"	Mitchell; Frederick Taylor	Toxic; John Gant	3:29
3.	"Fire" (featuring Lil Boosie)	Mitchell; Lindley; Torrence Hatch	The Legendary Traxster	4:27
4.	"Talk to Me"	Mitchell; Michael Moore	Solo; Tight Mike	3:21
5.	"Yellow Light" (featuring R. Kelly)	Mitchell; Lindley; Robert Kelly	The Legendary Traxster
6.	"Walking on Ice" (featuring Gucci Mane and OJ da Juiceman)	Mitchell; Otis Williams; Radric Davis; Xavier Dodson	Zaytoven	4:40
7.	"Wetter" (featuring Erika Shevon)	Mitchell; Lindley; Erika Lockhart; Quentin Saffold	The Legendary Traxster	4:11
8.	"Billionaire" (featuring Busta Rhymes)	Mitchell; Antonio Edwards; Maurice Conaway; Michel Bishop Goodfriend; Trevor Smith	Caution & Velly	4:11
9.	"Yo' Body" (featuring Do or Die and Johnny P)	Mitchell; Lindley; Anthony Round; Dennis Round; Jonathan Pilgram	The Legendary Traxster	3:47
10.	"Hustla"	Mitchell; Mike Aiello; Nicholas Warwar; P Jones	Streetrunner; I.L.O.	3:43
11.	"Gotta Get Me One" (featuring Static Major)	Mitchell; Lindley; Stephen Garrett	The Legendary Traxster	4:24
12.	"On Top" (featuring Akon)	Mitchell; Jonathan Rotem; Henri Lanz; Will Rappaport	J. R. Rotem; GoodWill & MGI	3:26
13.	"Jump Off"	Mitchell; Timothy Mosley; M Shiloh	Timbaland	3:10
14.	"Wanna See 'Em Buss" (featuring Liffy Stokes)	Taylor; C Thomas	Toxic	3:20
15.	"Birthday"	Mitchell; Marlin "Hookman" Bonds	Bonds	3:37

iTunes edition bonus tracks
No.	Title	Writer(s)	Producer(s)	Length
16.	"Read My Mind" (only featured on pre-order edition)			4:28
17.	"Alright" (featuring Kanye West)	Mitchell; Kanye West; Jeff Bhasker; Ernest Wilson	Kanye West; Boi Beatz; Jeff Bhasker; No I.D.	4:52

Best Buy edition bonus tracks
No.	Title	Producer(s)	Length
16.	"Can't Live Without You"	Ben Cybulsky	3:40
17.	"Block Music" (featuring Liffy Stokes, Skooda Chose and B-Hype)	Seven	3:32
18.	"Clappin'"	Bonds	4:11
19.	"I Got People" (featuring Speedknot Mobstaz)	The Legendary Traxster	3:40

Notes

- "Birthday" features additional vocals performed by Marlin "Hookman" Bonds.

== Personnel ==
Artists

- Twista – primary artist (all tracks)
- Buk – featured artist (track 1)
- Lil Boosie – featured artist (track 3)
- R. Kelly – featured artist (track 5)
- Gucci Mane – featured artist (track 6)
- OJ da Juiceman – featured artist (track 6)
- Erika Shevon – featured artist (track 7)
- Busta Rhymes – featured artist (track 8)
- Do or Die – featured artist (track 9)
- N.A.R.D. – featured artist (track 9)
- AK – featured artist (track 9)
- Johnny P – featured artist (track 9)
- Static Major – featured artist (track 11)
- Akon – featured artist (track 12)
- Liffy Stokes – featured artist (track 14)
- Marlin "Hookman" Bonds – background artist (track 15)

Technical personnel

- The Legendary Traxster – mastering (all tracks), mixing (tracks 1–3, 5–15), recording (1, 3, 5, 7, 9, 11)
- Team Shells - mixing (tracks 3, 5–8)
- Matt Hennessy – mastering
- Jon Spurgeon – recording (tracks 2, 4, 6, 8, 10–15), mixing (track 4)
- Toxic – recording (track 2, 14)
- R. Kelly – recording (track 5)

Record producers

- The Legendary Traxster – production (tracks 1, 3, 5, 7, 9, 11)
- John Grant – production (track 2)
- Team Shells – production (tracks 5, 8, 17)
- Toxic – production (tracks 2, 14)
- Solo – production (track 4)
- Tight Mike – production (track 4)
- Zaytoven – production (track 6)
- Caution & Velly – production (track 8)
- Streetrunner – production (track 10)
- I.L.O. – production (track 10)
- GoodWill & MGI – production (track 12)
- Chad Beatz – production (track 13)
- Marlin "Hookman" Bonds – production (track 15)
- Curtis Kincade – guitar (tracks 7, 11)

Additional personnel

- Carl Mitchell – executive producer
- Rawle Stewart – executive producer
