= Mr. Tung Twista =

Single by Tung Twista

from the album Runnin' Off at da Mouth
- B-side: "Hokus Pokus"
- Released: November 22, 1991
- Recorded: August 1991
- Genre: Chopper
- Length: 4:08
- Label: Zoo
- Songwriter: Carl Mitchell
- Producer: Titan

Tung Twista singles chronology
"Mr. Tung Twista" (1991)	"Po Pimp" (1996)

"Mr. Tung Twista" is the first single released by Twista, who was then known as Tung Twista, from his debut album, Runnin' Off at da Mouth. It was released on November 22, 1991, shortly before Twista became the Guinness Book of World Records holder as the fastest emcee in 1992. A promotional music video was released and got played on shows such as Yo! MTV Raps and Rap City, but the single itself failed to make it to the Billboard charts.

== Single track listing ==
1. "Mr. Tung Twista" (Vocal)- 4:07
2. "Mr. Tung Twista" (Accapella)- 1:00
3. "Mr. Tung Twista" (Instrumental)- 4:07
4. "Hokus Pokus"- 3:59
