= Runnin' Off at da Mouth =

Studio album by Tung Twista
- Released: 1992
- Recorded: 1991–1992
- Genre: Rap
- Length: 39:44
- Labels: Loud; Zoo; BMG
- Producers: DJ Rhythm; Fabian Fade Duvernay; Eric the Wiz; Low Level Productions; Quick Silver Cooley; Titan

Tung Twista chronology
Runnin' Off at da Mouth (1992)	Adrenaline Rush (1997)

Singles from Runnin' Off at da Mouth
- 1. "Mr. Tung Twista" Released: November 22, 1991

Runnin' Off at da Mouth is the debut studio album by American rapper Twista, who was known at the time as Tung Twista. Released in 1992, it was Loud Records' first release and its only release distributed by Zoo. The album was released after Twista entered the Guinness Book of World Records as the world's fastest emcee.

"Mr. Tung Twista" was the sole single released from the album, though it failed to chart.

== Critical reception ==
Professional ratings
Review scores
Source	Rating
AllMusic	2/5 stars
The Source	3/5 stars

The Washington Post wrote that "Tung Twista does decelerate later in the album on some songs, but by then chances are listeners are already exhausted from listening to the rapper's exhaustive style."

== Track listing ==
No.	Title	Producer(s)	Length
1.	"Ratatattat"	Low Level Production	3:42
2.	"Razzamatazz/Jazzamatazz"	DJ Rhythm	3:24
3.	"No Peace Sign"	Quick Silver Cooley	3:48
4.	"Nun ah Y'all Can Hang"	DJ Rhythm	3:55
5.	"Mr. Tung Twista" (featuring Tyrone Chilifoot)	Titan	4:08
6.	"Back 2 School"	DJ Rhythm	3:37
7.	"One Down, 2 2 Go"	DJ Rhythm	3:21
8.	"Frum da Tip of My Tung"	DJ Rhythm	3:01
9.	"Snap Happy"	DJ Rhythm	3:49
10.	"Runnin' Off at da Mouth"	DJ Rhythm	4:18
11.	"Say What"	DJ Rhythm	4:02
