= In That Water =

Studio album by Ghetto Twiinz
- Released: July 1, 1997
- Recorded: 1996–1997
- Studio: Upper Level Studio 302
- Genre: Hip-hop
- Label: Upper Level; Rap-A-Lot
- Producer: Leroy "Precise" Edwards

Ghetto Twiinz chronology
Surrounded by Criminals (1995)	In That Water (1997)	No Pain No Gain (1998)

Professional ratings
Review scores
Source	Rating
AllMusic	2.5/5 stars
The Source	3/5 stars

In That Water is the second studio album by American hip-hop duo Ghetto Twiinz. It was released in 1997 through Upper Level/Rap-A-Lot Records. Produced entirely by Leroy "Precise" Edwards, it features cameo appearances from Ms. Tee, B' Shipe, Mr. Slicc, Tre-8, The Threat, and Kango Slim. Supported by a lone promotional single "Responsibility", the album debuted at number 36 on the Top R&B/Hip-Hop Albums chart and number 13 on the Heatseekers Albums chart in the US.

== Critical reception ==
AllMusic's Leo Stanley wrote that "much of In That Water is simply gangsta clichés, yet there are moments where the Ghetto Twiinz make it work, either because they have a clever rhyme or a solid hook".

== Track listing ==
All tracks are written by Tonya Jupiter, Trementhia Jupiter and Leroy Edwards, except track 2 is written with LaMario Starks, track 4 is written with Luther Vandross, track 8 is written with Ronald Jones, and track 10 is written with Trishell Williams.

No.	Title	Length
1.	"Sho No Love"	4:29
2.	"Play on Playa"	3:44
3.	"Take N Money"	3:23
4.	"Gangsta Shit"	4:11
5.	"Yeagie Yah"	3:27
6.	"Responsibility"	4:52
7.	"In That Water"	4:21
8.	"Mind Blowin"	3:38
9.	"What a Way to Go"	2:54
10.	"Jealous Hoes"	4:05
11.	"Hold Up!"	4:17
12.	"Jump Jump!"	3:13
13.	"Mamma's Hurting"	3:51
14.	"All U Niggas"	4:03
15.	"Responsibility" (Remix)	4:41

Sample credits

- Track 4 embodies portions of "Promise Me" written by Luther Vandross.

== Charts ==
Chart (1997)	Peak position
US Top R&B Albums (Billboard)	36
US Heatseekers Albums (Billboard)	13
