= Snypaz =

American hip hop group

- Origin: Chicago, Illinois, U.S.
- Genres: Hip-hop
- Years active: 1993–present
- Labels: Virgin, Rap-A-Lot
- Members: 2/4 (now known as Staxx Malone); Chilla; R-O-B; Sic Wic; Killwood Syrup

Snypaz are a hip-hop group formed in Chicago in 1993. Their first release was the 1995 cassette tape Ridin' High; their 1996 EP, My Life as a Snypa, sold 80,000 copies. Relocating to Houston, Texas, the group recorded tracks with Do or Die for their album Headz or Tailz, and soon after appeared on Scarface's 1998 album, My Homies. In 2001, Snypaz signed with Virgin Records and issued their major-label debut, Livin' in the Scope. The title single from this album peaked at number 174 on the Billboard 200.

== Discography ==
=== Studio albums ===
- Livin' in the Scope (2001)
- Snypaz (2002)

=== Extended plays ===
- Servin Niggaz Young Playa Azz Zhit (1995)
- My Life as a Snypa (1996)
