= Ghetto Twiinz =

American hip hop group

- Also known as: Ghetto Twinz, Ghetto Twins
- Origin: New Orleans, Louisiana
- Genres: Hip-hop, gangsta rap, G-funk
- Years active: 1991–2001, 2010–present
- Labels: Rap-a-Lot, Noo Trybe, Virgin, Big Boy, Upper Level Records
- Members: Tonya Jupiter; Tremethia Jupiter

The Ghetto Twiinz is an American hip hop duo from New Orleans, Louisiana, composed of twin sisters Tonya and Tremethia Jupiter. From 1995 to 2001, the women released four albums, all of which made it to the Billboard Charts.

== Biography ==
Twin sisters Tonya and Tremethia Jupiter who were born in New Orleans in Louisiana, formed the Ghetto Twiinz in 1991 and were signed to independent record label, Big Boy Records, in 1994. After their debut album Surrounded By Criminals was released in 1996, they would join Rap-a-Lot Records and Noo Trybe Records. They would release three more albums In That Water (1997), No Pain No Gain (1998) and Got It on My Mind (2001) before disappearing from the music scene until releasing an EP Them People Coming in 2011.

On December 16, 2010 the Ghetto Twiinz returned to the stage at the House of Blues New Orleans and opened up for Mystikal, another prodigal performer recently returned to the limelight. Mannie Fresh primed the crowd for what was a spectacular display of showmanship on behalf of the twins.

== Discography ==
=== Studio albums ===
List of albums, with selected chart positions
Title	Album details	Peak chart positions		
Title	Album details	US	US R&B	US Heat
Surrounded By Criminals	Released: December 5, 1995; Label: Big Boy; Format: CD, digital download, LP	–	37	48
In That Water	Released: July 1, 1997; Label: Rap-a-Lot / Noo Trybe; Format: CD, digital download, LP	–	36	13
No Pain No Gain	Released: September 22, 1998; Label: Rap-a-Lot / Noo Trybe; Format: CD, digital download	191	35	15
Got It on My Mind	Released: March 27, 2001; Label: Rap-a-Lot / Noo Trybe; Format: CD, digital download	–	68	–

=== Extended plays ===
Title	Album details	Peak chart positions		
Title	Album details	US	US R&B	US Heat
Them People Coming	Released: November 30, 2010; Label: Select-O-Hits; Format: CD, digital download	–	-	-
