= Got It on My Mind =

Studio album by Ghetto Twiinz
- Released: March 27, 2001
- Recorded: 1999–2000
- Genre: Gangsta rap, Southern hip hop
- Label: Rap-A-Lot Records, Noo Trybe Records
- Producer: Leroy "Precise" Edwards, Mr. Lee, J. Prince

Ghetto Twiinz chronology
No Pain No Gain (1998)	Got It on My Mind (2001)

Got It on My Mind is the fourth and final album released by American hip hop duo Ghetto Twiinz. It was released on March 27, 2001, for Rap-A-Lot Records and Noo Trybe Records and featured production from Leroy "Precise" Edwards, Mr. Lee and J. Prince. Guitar and bass were performed by David "D-Funk" Faulk. Got It on My Mind peaked at No. 68 on the Billboard Top R&B/Hip-Hop Albums chart.

== Track listing ==
1. "Intro"- :46
2. "Gotta Get That $"- 3:47
3. "Head Bustin'"- 4:33
4. "Dumb Hoes, Fake Niggas"- 4:21
5. "N.W.A."- 3:59
6. "Got It on My Mind"- 3:11
7. "Sukey Sukey F/Dirty"- 4:27
8. "Tell Me Who"- 4:52
9. "Rumble With the South"- 4:02
10. "It's So Hard"- 4:50
11. "Youza Soldier"- 4:41
12. "Feet Don't Fail Me Na"- 4:36
13. "Love Ya Baby"- 3:07
14. "Outtro"- 1:10
15. "Gotta Get That $" (Radio Edit)- 3:45

== Chart performance ==
Chart performance for Got It on My Mind
Chart (2001)	Peak position
US Top R&B/Hip-Hop Albums (Billboard)	68
