= Mobstability II: Nation Business =

Mobstability II: Nation Bizness

Studio album by Speedknot Mobstaz
- Released: May 27, 2008
- Studio: G Note Studios
- Genre: Hip-hop
- Length: 57:53
- Label: Koch
- Producer: Steven Dukes; Cuzo; Ensayne Wayne; Herb Brasko

Speedknot Mobstaz chronology
Mobstability (1998)	Mobstability II: Nation Bizness (2008)

Professional ratings
Review scores
Source	Rating
AllMusic	3.5/5 stars
RapReviews	5/10

Mobstability II: Nation Bizness is the debut and second overall studio album by American hip-hop duo Speedknot Mobstaz. It was released on May 27, 2008 via Koch Records. All songs were recorded and mixed at G Note Studios. Production was handled by Steven Dukes, Cuzo, Ensayne Wayne and Herb Brasko. It features guest appearances from Twista, Toxic, Jim Jones, Mello Tha Guddamann and Skooda. In the United States, the album peaked at number 56 on the Top R&B/Hip-Hop Albums, number 22 on the Top Rap Albums and number 50 on the Independent Albums charts.

The album was made to commemorate the 10-year anniversary of their 1998 collaborative album with Twista entitled Mobstability. An accompanying music video was released for a promotional single "Money to Blow".

== Track listing ==
No.	Title	Writer(s)	Producer(s)	Length
1.	"Intro"			1:00
2.	"Tippin n Ballin"	Calvin Thomas; Jabari Bristow; Michael Moore	Cuzo	3:04
3.	"Dopeboy" (featuring Mello Tha Gudda Mann)	Thomas; Bristow; Ronell Lewis; Steven Dukes	Steven Dukes	3:42
4.	"Cognac n Zesbud"	Thomas; Bristow; Moore	Cuzo	2:50
5.	"Getcha Money Right" (featuring Twista)	Thomas; Bristow; Carl Mitchell; H. Coleman	Herb Brasko	3:55
6.	"Skit"			0:30
7.	"18 Hoes" (featuring Toxic)	Thomas; Bristow; Frederick Taylor; Dukes	Steven Dukes	3:57
8.	"Money to Blow" (featuring Twista and Skooda)	Thomas; Bristow; Mitchell; Taylor	Steven Dukes	3:02
9.	"Nation Bizness" (featuring Twista)	Thomas; Bristow; Mitchell; Dukes	Steven Dukes	3:54
10.	"Raised on the Block"	Thomas; Bristow; Dukes	Steven Dukes	4:08
11.	"Chicago Intro"			0:18
12.	"Chicago"	Thomas; Moore	Cuzo	4:03
13.	"Killa" (featuring Toxic)	Thomas; Bristow; Taylor; Dukes	Steven Dukes	4:05
14.	"I'ma Speedknot Mobsta" (featuring Twista)	Thomas; Bristow; Mitchell; Dukes	Steven Dukes	4:29
15.	"Thug Outta Me"	Thomas; Bristow; Dukes	Steven Dukes	3:10
16.	"Money n Murder"	Thomas; Bristow; Dukes	Steven Dukes	3:26
17.	"Gangstaz Don't Dance" (featuring Jim Jones)	Thomas; Bristow; Joseph Jones; Ferrell Wayne Miles	Insane Wayne	3:59
18.	"Skit"			0:36
19.	"Bush Made It Hard"	Thomas; Bristow; Dukes; J. Walker	Steven Dukes	3:38
20.	"Outro"			0:07
Total length:				57:53

== Charts ==
Chart (2008)	Peak position
US Top R&B/Hip-Hop Albums (Billboard)	56
US Top Rap Albums (Billboard)	22
US Independent Albums (Billboard)	50
