= 5th Ward Juvenilez =

American rappers

- Also known as: F.W.C.
- Origin: Fifth Ward, Houston, Texas, USA
- Genres: Hip-Hop
- Years active: 1993–1998
- Label: Rap-a-Lot
- Members: Daddy Lo; Mr. Slimm; Nickelboy

The 5th Ward Juvenilez was an American hip hop group from the 5th Ward of Houston, Texas. The group consisted of Daddy Lo, Mr. Slimm and Nickelboy and was signed to Rap-a-Lot Records.

== History ==
Formed in 1993, the 5th Ward Juvenilez made their debut on 2-Low's 1993 debut album, Funky Lil Brotha on the track entitled "Comin' Up". After guest appearances on the 5th Ward Boyz' Gangsta Funk and the Blac Monks' Secrets of the Hidden Temple in 1994, Rap-a-Lot issued the Juvenilez debut single "G-Groove" in late 1994. The following year saw the release of their debut Deadly Groundz. The album barely made the Billboard 200, making it to the very last spot on the chart, but found better success on the R&B and Heatseekers charts, peaking at 28 and 9 respectively.

In 1998, Nickelboy and Mr. Slimm changed their names to Gotti and Frank Nitti and became known as the F.W.C., or Fifth Ward Circle. They released an album entitled Organized Crime in 1998 before calling it quits for good.

== Discography ==
Year	Title	Chart positions	
Year	Title	U.S.	U.S. R&B
1995	Deadly Groundz: Released: June 20, 1995; Label: Rap-a-Lot	200	28
