= Get That Paper (Do or Die album) =

Studio album by Do or Die
- Released: March 28, 2006
- Recorded: 2005–06
- Genre: Hip hop
- Length: 41:22
- Label: Rap-A-Lot 4 Life
- Producer: J. Prince (exec.); Cayex; The Legendary Traxster; Wax Master Maurice

Do or Die chronology
D.O.D. (2005)	Get That Paper (2006)	Picture This II (2015)

Professional ratings
Review scores
Source	Rating
AllMusic	4/5 stars

Get That Paper is the seventh studio album by American hip hop group Do Or Die. It was released on March 28, 2006 via Rap-A-Lot 4 Life. Production was handled by The Legendary Traxster, Cayex and Wax Master Maurice, with J. Prince serving as executive producer. It features guest appearances from Bun B and Johnny P. The album peaked at number 159 on the Billboard 200 and number 29 on the Top R&B/Hip-Hop Albums.

== Track listing ==
No.	Title	Writer(s)	Producer(s)	Length
1.	"24-36-24"	Darnell Smith; Dennis Round	Cayex	3:48
2.	"Grown Folk Biz"	Smith; D. Round; Anthony Round	Cayex	3:32
3.	"Get Yo Gunz"	Smith; D. Round; A. Round; Samuel Lindley	The Legendary Traxster	3:09
4.	"Hey Ma!" (featuring Bun B)	Smith; D. Round; Bernard Freeman	Cayex	5:11
5.	"Holla" (featuring Johnny P.)	Smith; D. Round; A. Round	Wax Master Maurice	3:21
6.	"It Ain't Hard"	Smith; D. Round; A. Round; Lindley	The Legendary Traxster	3:54
7.	"On My Own"	Smith; D. Round; A. Round; Lindley	The Legendary Traxster	3:40
8.	"Get This Paper"	Smith; D. Round; A. Round; Lindley	The Legendary Traxster	3:43
9.	"Somethin' Like a Playa"	Smith; D. Round; A. Round; Lindley	The Legendary Traxster	4:17
10.	"Street Shit"	Smith; D. Round; A. Round; Lindley	The Legendary Traxster	3:28
11.	"Up That Scratch"	Smith; D. Round; A. Round; Lindley	The Legendary Traxster	3:19
Total length:				41:22

== Charts ==
Chart (2006)	Peak position
US Billboard 200	159
US Top R&B/Hip-Hop Albums (Billboard)	29
