= Back 2 the Game =

Studio album by Do or Die
- Released: August 13, 2002
- Recorded: 2001–02
- Studio: The Legendary Traxster, Inc.; Legit Ballers Studio; Most Wanted Studio; Chicago Tracks; Chicago Recording Company
- Genre: Hip hop
- Length: 1:03:53
- Label: Rap-A-Lot; Virgin
- Producer: Datanna; Naki; The Legendary Traxster; Toxic

Do or Die chronology
Victory (2000)	Back 2 the Game (2002)	Pimpin' Ain't Dead (2003)

Professional ratings
Review scores
Source	Rating
AllMusic	2.5/5 stars

Back 2 the Game is the fourth studio album by American hip hop group Do Or Die. It was released on August 13, 2002, via Rap-A-Lot/Virgin Records. Recording sessions took place at The Legendary Traxster, Inc., at Legit Ballers Studio, at Most Wanted Studio, at Chicago Tracks, and at Chicago Recording Company. Production was handled by The Legendary Traxster, Toxic, Naki and Datanna, with J. Prince serving as executive producer. It features guest appearances from Johnny P., Twista and Yung Buk. The album peaked at No. 64 on the Billboard 200 and No. 25 on the Top R&B/Hip-Hop Albums chart.

== Track listing ==
No.	Title	Writer(s)	Producer(s)	Length
1.	"Beyond the Surface"	Anthony Round; Darnell Smith; Dennis Round; Frederick Taylor	Toxic	4:16
2.	"Ain't No Punk"	A. Round; Smith; D. Round; Samuel Lindley	The Legendary Traxster	4:09
3.	"Sex Appeal" (featuring Twista and Johnny P.)	A. Round; Smith; D. Round; Taylor	Toxic	4:22
4.	"Diamenz" (featuring Johnny P.)	A. Round; Smith; D. Round; Daniel Griffin	Datanna	5:18
5.	"I Got a Problem" (featuring Yungbuck)	A. Round; Smith; D. Round; Jeffery Robinson; Lindley	The Legendary Traxster	4:33
6.	"We Are Here"	A. Round; Smith; D. Round; Taylor	Toxic	5:19
7.	"3 A.M." (featuring Johnny P.)	A. Round; Smith; D. Round; Lindley	The Legendary Traxster	4:57
8.	"Secret Indictment"	A. Round; Smith; D. Round; Lindley	The Legendary Traxster	5:12
9.	"Dead Homies" (featuring Johnny P.)	A. Round; Smith; D. Round; Lindley	The Legendary Traxster	5:32
10.	"That's My Car" (featuring Johnny P.)	A. Round; Smith; D. Round; Lindley	The Legendary Traxster	4:08
11.	"Menage a trois" (featuring Johnny P.)	A. Round; Smith; D. Round; Lindley	The Legendary Traxster	4:47
12.	"Touchdown"	A. Round; Smith; D. Round; Johnnie Moore	Naki	3:04
13.	"Don't Touch My Money"	A. Round; Smith; D. Round; J. Moore	Naki	4:02
14.	"Diamenz (Remix)" (featuring Johnny P.)	A. Round; Smith; D. Round		4:14
Total length:				1:03:53

Sample credits

- Track 4 contains portions of the composition "Be Thankful for What You Got" by William DeVaughn
- Track 7 contains portions of the composition "Love You Down" by Ready for the World

== Personnel ==
- Anthony "N.A.R.D." Round – vocals
- Darnell "Belo Zero" Smith – vocals
- Dennis "AK47" Round – vocals
- John "Johnny P" Pigram – vocals (tracks: 3, 4, 7, 9–11, 14)
- Carl "Twista" Mitchell – vocals (track 3)
- Jeffery "Yung Buk" Robinson – vocals (track 5)
- Frederick "Toxic" Taylor – producer (tracks: 1, 3, 6), engineering, mixing
- Samuel "The Legendary Traxster" Lindley – producer (tracks: 2, 5, 7–11), engineering, mixing
- Daniel "Datanna" Griffin – producer (track 4)
- Johnnie "Naki" Moore – producer (tracks: 12, 13), engineering, mixing
- Larry Sturm – engineering, mixing
- Manny Mohr – engineering, mixing
- Chris Steinmetz – mixing
- Eddy Schreyer – mastering
- James "J. Prince" Smith – executive producer
- Jason Clark – artwork, design, layout
- T. Hopkins – photography
- Tony "Big Chief" Randle – A&R
- Anzel "Int'l Red" Jennings – A&R

== Charts ==
Chart (2002)	Peak position
US Billboard 200	64
US Top R&B/Hip-Hop Albums (Billboard)	25
