= Po Pimp =

Single by Do or Die featuring Twista & Johnny P

from the album Picture This
- B-side: "Promise"
- Released: July 16, 1996
- Recorded: 1995
- Genre: Hip hop
- Length: 3:54
- Label: Rap-a-Lot
- Songwriters: Do or Die & Twista
- Producer: The Legendary Traxster

Do or Die singles chronology
"Po Pimp" (1996)	"Still Po Pimpin" (1998)

Twista singles chronology
"Mr. Tung Twista" (1991)	"Po Pimp" (1996)	"Emotions" (1997)

"Po Pimp" is the debut single by American hip-hop trio Do or Die. It served as the lead single from their debut studio album, Picture This (1996), and was produced by The Legendary Traxster. The song features a guest verse from fellow Chicago rapper Twista and vocals from R&B singer Johnny P.

== Background ==
"Po Pimp" was originally released independently in the group's native Chicago. The song became a local hit and caught the attention of prominent Houston-based hip hop label Rap-a-Lot Records, who signed the trio to a record deal. Rap-a-Lot then released "Po Pimp" nationwide in the summer of 1996 and it quickly became a breakthrough hit for the trio. It peaked at No. 22 on the Billboard Hot 100 on October 19 and also reached No. 1 on the Hot Rap Singles chart. By the end of 1996, "Po Pimp" had become one of the most popular and best selling singles of the year; it sold 600,000 copies, earning a gold certification from the RIAA, and was listed in Billboard's Year-End Hot 100 Singles of 1996 at No. 91.

This song, later, had 4 sequels: "Still Po Pimpin" from "Headz Or Tailz", "Sex Appeal" from "Back 2 Tha Game" and "Do U?" from "Pimpin Ain't Dead", the 4th sequel is on "Category F5" by Twista called "Yo Body"

== Single track listing ==
1. "Po Pimp" (Radio Version)- 3:57
2. "Po Pimp" (Dirty Version)- 4:00
3. "Promise"- 4:39
4. "Promise" (Instrumental)- 4:39

== Charts and certifications ==
=== Weekly charts ===
Chart (1996)	Peak position
US Billboard Hot 100	22
US Hot R&B/Hip-Hop Singles & Tracks (Billboard)	15
US Hot Rap Singles (Billboard)	1
US Rhythmic Top 40 (Billboard)	39
US Cash Box Top 100	19

=== Year-end charts ===
Year-End chart (1996)	Position
US Billboard Hot 100	91

=== Certifications ===
Region	Certification	Certified units/sales
United States (RIAA)	Gold	600,000
