= Picture This (Do or Die album) =

Studio album by Do or Die
- Released: September 3, 1996
- Studios: Creator's Way (Chicago, IL); Lil J (Houston, TX)
- Genre: Hip hop · gangsta rap
- Length: 50:40
- Labels: Rap-A-Lot; Noo Trybe
- Producers: Crazy C; Mike Dean; the Legendary Traxster

Do or Die chronology
Picture This (1996)	Headz or Tailz (1998)

Singles from Picture This
- 1. "Po Pimp" Released: July 16, 1996; 2. "Playa Like Me and You" Released: 1996

Professional ratings
Review scores
Source	Rating
AllMusic	3/5 stars
RapReviews	7/10
The Source	3.5/5 stars

Picture This is the debut studio album by American hip hop group Do or Die. It was released on September 3, 1996, via Rap-A-Lot Records and Noo Trybe Records. The recording sessions took place at Creator's Way Studios in Chicago and at Lil J Studio in Houston. The album was produced by the Legendary Traxster, Mike Dean and Crazy C, with J. Prince serving as executive producer. It features guest appearances from Twista and Johnny P.

The album peaked at number 27 on the Billboard 200 and number 3 on the Top R&B/Hip-Hop Albums. The album featured the hit single, "Po Pimp", which peaked at number 22 on the Billboard Hot 100 and topped the Hot Rap Singles.

== Track listing ==
No.	Title	Writer(s)	Producer(s)	Length
1.	"Alpha and Omega"	Anthony Round; Darnell Smith; Dennis Round; Samuel Lindley	The Legendary Traxster	3:10
2.	"Shut 'Em Down"	A. Round; Smith; D. Round; Lindley	The Legendary Traxster	4:41
3.	"Po Pimp" (featuring Tung Twista and Johnny P)	A. Round; Smith; D. Round; Carl Mitchell; Lindley	The Legendary Traxster	3:54
4.	"Kill or Be Killed"	A. Round; Smith; D. Round; Michael Dean	Mike Dean	5:44
5.	"Paper Chase" (featuring Tung Twista)	A. Round; Smith; D. Round; Mitchell; Dean	Mike Dean	3:53
6.	"Playa Like Me and You" (featuring Johnny P)	A. Round; Smith; D. Round; Lindley	The Legendary Traxster	4:45
7.	"Promise"	A. Round; Smith; D. Round; Lindley	The Legendary Traxster	4:39
8.	"6 Million"	A. Round; Smith; D. Round; Lindley	The Legendary Traxster	4:42
9.	"Search Warrant"	A. Round; Smith; D. Round; Lindley	The Legendary Traxster	4:31
10.	"Anotha One Dead and Gone"	A. Round; Smith; D. Round; Lindley	The Legendary Traxster	5:29
11.	"Money Flow" (featuring Tung Twista)	A. Round; Smith; D. Round; Mitchell; Simon Cullins	Crazy C	5:12
Total length:				50:40

== Personnel ==
- Anthony "N.A.R.D." Round – vocals
- Darnell "Belo Zero" Smith – vocals
- Dennis "AK47" Round – vocals
- Carl "Twista" Mitchell – vocals (tracks: 3, 5, 11)
- John "Johnny P" Pigram – vocals (tracks: 3, 6)
- Samuel "The Legendary Traxster" Lindley – producer (tracks: 1–3, 6–10), engineering, mixing
- Mike Dean – producer (tracks: 4, 5), engineering, mixing, mastering
- Simon "Crazy C" Cullins – producer (track 11)
- James A. Smith – executive producer
- Tony "Big Chief" Randle – production supervisor
- Denise Milford – photography

== Charts ==
=== Weekly charts ===
Chart (1996)	Peak position
US Billboard 200	27
US Top R&B/Hip-Hop Albums (Billboard)	3

=== Year-end charts ===
Chart (1996)	Position
US Top R&B/Hip-Hop Albums (Billboard)	52

== Certifications ==
Region	Certification	Certified units/sales
United States (RIAA)	Gold	500,000^{^}
^{^} Shipments figures based on certification alone.
