= Pimpin' Ain't Dead =

Studio album by Do or Die
- Released: August 19, 2003
- Recorded: 2002–03
- Studio: CWAL MOB Recordings (Illinois); Noddfactor Studios (Denton, Texas)
- Genre: Hip hop
- Length: 49:36
- Label: Rap-A-Lot 4 Life
- Producer: Mr. Lee; The Legendary Traxster

Do or Die chronology
Back 2 the Game (2002)	Pimpin' Ain't Dead (2003)	D.O.D (2005)

Singles from Pimpin' Ain't Dead
- 1. "Do U?" Released: 2003

Professional ratings
Review scores
Source	Rating
AllMusic	3/5 stars

Pimpin' Ain't Dead is the fifth studio album by American hip hop group Do Or Die. It was released on August 19, 2003, via Rap-A-Lot Records. Recording sessions took place at CWAL MOB Recordings in Illinois and at Noddfactor Studios in Texas. Production was handled by The Legendary Traxster, except for one song, "In A Minute", which was produced by Mr. Lee. It features guest appearances from Johnny P., the Legendary Traxster, Dun D, E.C. Illa, Navee, Twista and Z-Ro. The album peaked at number 115 on the Billboard 200 and number 17 on the Top R&B/Hip-Hop Albums chart in the United States.

== Track listing ==
No.	Title	Writer(s)	Producer(s)	Length
1.	"One More Way 2 Die" (featuring White Folks)	Anthony Round; Darnell Smith; R. Codell; Samuel Lindley	The Legendary Traxster	5:12
2.	"Do U?" (featuring Twista and Johnny P)	A. Round; Smith; Carl Mitchell; S. Lindley	The Legendary Traxster	4:11
3.	"Fantasy"	A. Round; Smith; S. Lindley	The Legendary Traxster	4:11
4.	"See It Through Reality" (featuring The Legendary Traxster)	A. Round; S. Lindley	The Legendary Traxster	4:20
5.	"Lil' Ghetto Boy" (featuring Johnny P)	A. Round; Dennis Round; Smith; S. Lindley	The Legendary Traxster	4:14
6.	"Stateville" (featuring The Legendary Traxster and Dun D)	A. Round; D. Round; Smith; L. Lindley; S. Lindley	The Legendary Traxster	3:42
7.	"Don't Give No Fuck (No Love 2K3)"	A. Round; D. Round; Smith; S. Lindley	The Legendary Traxster	3:37
8.	"Bomb on Contact"	A. Round; D. Round; Smith; S. Lindley	The Legendary Traxster	3:47
9.	"Not 4 U" (featuring Johnny P)	Smith; S. Lindley	The Legendary Traxster	4:51
10.	"In a Minute" (featuring Navee and Z-Ro)	A. Round; Joseph McVey; Leroy Williams	Mr. Lee	3:18
11.	"Who I Fuck Wit"	Smith; S. Lindley	The Legendary Traxster	3:55
12.	"Cold World"	A. Round; D. Round; Smith; S. Lindley	The Legendary Traxster	4:18
Total length:				49:36

== Personnel ==
- Anthony "N.A.R.D." Round – vocals (tracks: 1–8, 10, 12)
- Darnell "Belo Zero" Smith – vocals (tracks: 1–3, 5–9, 11–12)
- Dennis "AK47" Round – vocals (tracks: 5–8, 12)
- R. "E.C. Illa/White Folks" Codell – vocals (track 1)
- Carl "Twista" Mitchell – vocals (track 2)
- John "Johnny P" Pigram – vocals (tracks: 2, 5, 9)
- Samuel "The Legendary Traxster" Lindley – vocals (tracks: 4, 6), additional vocals (track 12), producer (tracks: 1–9, 11, 12), mixing, engineering
- L. "Dun D" Lindley – vocals (track 6)
- Navee – vocals (track 10)
- Joseph "Z-Ro" McVey IV – vocals (track 10)
- Lauren Gaines – backing vocals (track 3)
- Connie Jr. – backing vocals (track 12)
- Leroy "Mr. Lee" Williams – producer (track 10), engineering
- Mike Dean – mixing, mastering
- James "J. Prince" Smith – executive producer
- Mike Frost – artwork, design, photography, layout
- Tony "Big Chief" Randle – A&R
- Anzel "Int'l Red" Jennings – A&R

== Charts ==
Chart (2003)	Peak position
US Billboard 200	115
US Top R&B/Hip-Hop Albums (Billboard)	17
