= Headz or Tailz =

Studio album by Do or Die
- Released: April 7, 1998
- Recorded: 1997–98
- Studios: Hippie House Houston; Knock Hard, Houston; Creator's Way, Chicago
- Genre: Gangsta rap
- Length: 1:11:58
- Labels: Rap-A-Lot; Virgin
- Producers: Mike Dean; Mr. Lee; the Legendary Traxster

Do or Die chronology
Picture This (1996)	Headz or Tailz (1998)	Victory (2000)

Singles from Headz or Tailz
- 1. "Still Po Pimpin" Released: March 10, 1998

Professional ratings
Review scores
Source	Rating
AllMusic	3/5 stars
RapReviews	7/10

Headz or Tailz is the second studio album by American hip hop group Do Or Die. It was released on April 7, 1998, via Rap-A-Lot/Virgin Records. The recording sessions took place at Hippie House Studios and Knock Hard Studio in Houston and at Creator's Way Studios in Chicago. It was produced by the Legendary Traxster, Mr. Lee and Mike Dean, with J. Prince serving as executive producer. It features guest appearances from Danny Boy, Johnny P., Beyond Content, Bushwick Bill, Chilla, Scarface, Shock tha World, Twista, and Val Young. The album peaked at number 13 on the Billboard 200 and number 3 on the Top R&B/Hip-Hop Albums. It was certified Gold by the Recording Industry Association of America on May 29, 1998. Its lead single, "Still Po Pimpin", reached at No. 62 on the Billboard Hot 100 and No. 16 on the Hot Rap Singles. The song "Bustin Back" is a diss track towards Bone Thugs-n-Harmony.

== Track listing ==
No.	Title	Writer(s)	Producer(s)	Length
1.	"Headz"	Darnell Smith; Dennis Round; Anthony Round; Leroy Williams	Mr. Lee	3:01
2.	"Just Ballin"	Smith; D. Round; A. Round; Williams	Mr. Lee	4:51
3.	"Pimpology"	Smith; D. Round; A. Round; Williams; D'wayne Wiggins; Carl Wheeler; William Collins; George Clinton; Gary Cooper; Eric Baker; Raphael Wiggins; Timothy Christian Riley	Mr. Lee	4:17
4.	"Lil Sum Sum"	Smith; D. Round; Samuel Lindley	The Legendary Traxster	4:28
5.	"Nobody's Home" (featuring Johnny P and Danny Boy)	Smith; D. Round; A. Round; Lindley; Ernie Isley; Marvin Isley; O'Kelly Isley; Ronald Isley; Rudolph Isley; Chris Jasper	The Legendary Traxster	5:00
6.	"Still Po Pimpin" (featuring Johnny P and Twista)	Smith; D. Round; Carl Mitchell; Williams	Mr. Lee	4:00
7.	"All in the Club" (featuring Danny Boy)	Smith; D. Round; A. Round; Lindley	The Legendary Traxster	4:40
8.	"Can I" (featuring Beyond Content)	Smith; D. Round; A. Round; Lindley; Shawn Stockman; Bob Robinson; Tim Kelley	The Legendary Traxster	4:31
9.	"Choppin Up That Paper" (featuring Val Young)	Smith; D. Round; A. Round; Michael Dean	Mike Dean	4:08
10.	"Gangsta Shit" (featuring Shock Tha World)	Smith; D. Round; A. Round; Lindley	The Legendary Traxster	2:39
11.	"Bustin Back" (featuring Chilla)	Smith; D. Round; A. Round; Charles Paxton; Lindley	The Legendary Traxster	5:00
12.	"Ultimate Shutdown"	Smith; D. Round; A. Round; Williams	Mr. Lee	3:51
13.	"Who Am I" (featuring Scarface)	Smith; D. Round; A. Round; Brad Jordan; Lindley	The Legendary Traxster	5:45
14.	"Caine House"	Smith; D. Round; A. Round; Lindley	The Legendary Traxster	4:33
15.	"Under Surveillance"	Smith; D. Round; A. Round; Williams	Mr. Lee	4:34
16.	"Dead or Alive"	Smith; D. Round; A. Round; Williams	Mr. Lee	4:48
17.	"Tailz" (featuring Bushwick Bill)	Smith; D. Round; A. Round; Williams	Mr. Lee	1:52
Total length:				1:11:58

== Personnel ==
- Darnell "Belo Zero" Smith – vocals
- Dennis "AK47" Round – vocals
- Anthony "N.A.R.D." Round – vocals (tracks: 1–3, 5, 7–17)
- John "Johnny P" Pigram – vocals (tracks: 5, 6)
- Daniel "Danny Boy" Steward – vocals (tracks: 5, 7)
- Carl "Twista" Mitchell – vocals (track 6)
- Beyond Content – vocals (track 8)
- Valaria Marie Young – vocals (track 9)
- Shock Tha World – vocals (track 10)
- Charles "Chilla" Paxton – vocals (track 11)
- Brad "Scarface" Jordan – vocals (track 13)
- Richard "Bushwick Bill" Shaw – vocals (track 17)
- Leroy "Mr. Lee" Williams Jr. – producer (tracks: 1–3, 6, 12, 15–17), engineering, mixing
- Samuel "The Legendary Traxster" Lindley – producer (tracks: 4, 5, 7, 8, 10, 11, 13, 14), engineering, mixing
- Mike Dean – producer (track 9), engineering, mixing, mastering
- James A. Smith – executive producer
- Donavin "Kid Styles" Murray – art direction, photography
- Barrencia Marcee – art direction
- Lisa Browne – art direction

== Charts ==
Chart (1998)	Peak position
US Billboard 200	13
US Top R&B/Hip-Hop Albums (Billboard)	3

== Certifications ==
Region	Certification	Certified units/sales
United States (RIAA)	Gold	500,000^{^}
^{^} Shipments figures based on certification alone.
