= Speedknot Mobstaz =

American hip hop group

- Origin: Chicago, Illinois, U.S.
- Genre: Hip hop
- Years active: 1994–present
- Labels: Big Beat; Atlantic; Koch
- Members: Liffy Stokes; Mayz

Speedknot Mobstaz are a hip hop duo from Chicago formed by Twista. They made their debut appearance on Twista's second album, Resurrection (1994). As a duo, they released the album Mobstability (1998) for Atlantic Records, and its sequel, Mobstability II: Nation Business (2004) a decade later independently. The former peaked at number 34 on the Billboard 200.

== Discography ==
Year	Title	Chart positions		
Year	Title	US	US R&B	US Rap
1998	Mobstability	34	9	*
2008	Mobstability II: Nation Business	—	52	22
2009	Black Santa (Mixtape)	—	—	—
2010	Black Santa's Revenge (Mixtape)	—	—	—
