= Do or Die (group) =

American rap trio from Illinois

- Origin: Chicago, Illinois, U.S.
- Genres: Midwestern hip-hop; gangsta rap
- Years active: 1995–present
- Labels: The Legion; Atlantic; Rap-A-Lot; Virgin
- Members: N.A.R.D. Belo Zero; AK-47

Do or Die is an American hip-hop trio originally from the East Garfield Park neighborhood on the West Side of Chicago, consisting of N.A.R.D., Belo Zero, and AK-47. The group experienced mainstream success with the platinum single "Po Pimp", which peaked at #22 on the Billboard Hot 100.

== Music career ==
=== 1996: Picture This ===
Do or Die gained a hit with their first single, "Po Pimp". Released on an up and coming independent Chicago label, Creator's Way Records, the track became a local hit and sparked the group's signing by Houston's Rap-A-Lot Records. Given a wide release in the summer of 1996, the single hit number 22, increasing the buzz for a full-length album from the group. In September of that year, Picture This was released on Rap-A-Lot. The album was certified Gold and has since reached certified Platinum, and launched the group, as well as fellow Chicago rapper Twista, who was featured on the track, into superstardom.

=== 1998: Headz or Tailz ===
In 1998, the group released their sophomore album, "Headz or Tailz". Like the group's previous album, Headz or Tailz was a success, peaking at #13 on the Billboard 200 and #3 on the Top R&B/Hip-Hop Albums, producing the successful single, "Still Po Pimpin", which featured Twista and Johnny P, and peaked at #62 on the Billboard Hot 100 and #16 on the Hot Rap Singles. Headz or Tailz has reached certified Platinum.

=== 2000–2005: Victory, Pimpin' Ain't Dead, D.O.D ===
Do or Die went on to release several other charting albums throughout the early 2000s, including 2000's Victory, which featured E-40, Ja Rule, and Outlawz to name a few, and 2002's Back 2 the Game, which peaked at #64 on the Billboard 200 and #25 on the Top R&B/Hip-Hop Albums. In 2003, the group released Pimpin' Ain't Dead, which spawned the hit single "Do U?", which featured Twista and Johnny P. Following this album, Do or Die released D.O.D. in 2005, which featured many notable industry names including production from Kanye West, DJ Quik, and R. Kelly.

=== 2006: Get That Paper ===
Do or Die returned to Rap-A-Lot for 2006's Get That Paper. The album had a much darker, street-oriented sound to it and had only one feature on it from Rap-A-Lot label-mate Bun B. The album was met with critical success.

In October 2007, Belo Zero pleaded guilty in a plea bargain to the shooting death of Raymond "B-Dog" Pinkston and was sentenced to 10 years in prison of which he served five years. Belo continues to maintain that he shot Pinkston in self-defense, however after a 6 year long court battle, he agreed to the plea bargain. During this time, Do or Die continued to make music and were featured on countless projects from various artists, in addition to touring all over the country, and in 2009, they appeared on Twista's single "Yo Body" off his 2009 album, Category F5.

=== 2015–present: Withdrawal EP, Picture This 2, death of Johnny P ===
Upon reuniting, Do or Die released several singles and new projects, including "Loudpack" and "Do Yo Thang". The group also collaborated with French hip hop beatmaker Onra on his 2015 album Fundamentals on a track entitled "Over and Over" featuring Johnny P.

On April 15, 2015, Twista announced that he and Do or Die had completed work on a new collaborative EP together entitled Withdrawal. The EP was released on May 19, 2015, and contains six tracks, including a single entitled "Aqua Fina", for which a video was released. In an interview with XXL shortly after the EP was released, Twista confirmed that there would be a follow-up EP entitled 'Withdrawal 2'.

On September 18, 2015, the group released Picture This II. The album featured longtime collaborators Johnny P and Twista on several tracks as well as Rick Ross on the album's first single, "Love in the Sky".

On November 27, 2016, longtime Do or Die collaborator Johnny P died at age 44. While the exact cause of death is unknown, it was reported that Johnny P had been in a coma for several weeks until his death.

== Discography ==
=== Studio albums ===
- Picture This (1996)
- Headz or Tailz (1998)
- Victory (2000)
- Back 2 the Game (2002)
- Pimpin' Ain't Dead (2003)
- D.O.D. (2005)
- Get That Paper (2006)
- Picture This II (2015)
- The Pass Out (2020)
- The Storm (2022)

=== Extended plays ===
- Withdrawal with Twista (2015)
