= The Legendary Traxster =

American songwriter, rapper and record producer (born 1973)

- Born: Samuel Christopher Lindley; July 14, 1973 (age 53); Chicago, Illinois, U.S.
- Genres: Hip hop
- Occupations: Songwriter; record producer; rapper
- Years active: 1991–present
- Labels: Traxster Inc.; CWAL; Nothing But Dope; Priority
- Member of: House Lindley
- Spouse: Latia "Tia London" Lindley (m. 2015)
- Website: traxster.com

Samuel Christopher Lindley (born July 14, 1973), better known by his stage name the Legendary Traxster, is an American songwriter, rapper and record producer. He is best known as a producer for hip hop artist Twista and group Do or Die.

Lindley is the owner of Traxster Inc. and co-CEO of CWAL Records. In 2017, he launched Nothing But Dope, an imprint distributed through Priority Records. He is also one half of the hip hop duo House Lindley, which is composed of him and his wife Latia "Tia London" Lindley.

== Career ==
A native of Chicago, Lindley rose to prominence for his production work for fellow Chicago artists Twista and famed rap trio Do or Die, for whom he produced several albums, including their 1996 debut Picture This, which was certified gold. In 1997, Traxster produced the entirety of Twista's certified platinum album, Adrenaline Rush. He has also produced for Kanye West, Ty Dolla Sign, Big Sean, Mystikal, E-40, Cam'ron, Tech N9ne, and The Outlawz, with songs featuring notable artists, including Chris Brown, Waka Flocka Flame, Yo Gotti, Ray J, R. Kelly, T.I., Lil Boosie, Scarface, Bun B, WC, C-Bo, Static Major, Raekwon, and Shawnna.

He earned a Grammy nomination for Album of the Year in 2006 for his work with Mariah Carey, co-writing and producing the track "One and Only" on her 2005 album, The Emancipation of Mimi.

In 2009, he reunited with Twista for Category F5, including the single, "Wetter", which was certified gold and went on to win two ASCAP Rhythm & Soul Music Awards in the Rap and R&B/Hip Hop category. The duo also collaborated on "Make a Movie", which featured Chris Brown. The song was the lead single for Twista's 2010 album, The Perfect Storm, which featured eight songs produced by Traxster.

Lindley participated in the ASCAP SCORES program, leading a songwriting class with kids at Chalmers Elementary School in Chicago on December 1 and 8, 2010. Traxster and the students recorded the song at Chicago Recording Company studios on December 14, 2010, with the finished track included on a compilation CD produced by ASCAP, and distributed to music industry decision makers and each of the schools involved.

The following year, he produced the single "My Chick Bad" by Ludacris featuring Nicki Minaj, from his chart-topping album, Battle of the Sexes, as well as the official remix, which featured Eve, Trina, and Diamond. The song peaked at number 11 on the Billboard Hot 100, and was nominated for a 2011 Grammy Award in the category Best Rap Performance by a Duo or Group. On November 30, 2022, the single was certified triple platinum in the US.

In January 2017, Lindley signed a deal with Priority Records for his label Nothing But Dope. The new Priority Records launched in 2013. The label's re-launch was a venture by Capitol Records, which is owned by the Universal Music Group.

== Personal life ==
In 2015, Lindley married singer-songwriter Tia London. They have one child together, who was born in July 2015.

== Discography ==
- 2001: All Hell Breaks Loose
- 2008: The Return of Gangsta Music
- 2013: You Owe Me A Favor (beat tape)
- 2015: You Owe Me Another Favor (beat tape)
- 2016: Black Saints
- 2020: Vintage Traxster
- 2021: The Wedding
- 2023: Chicago
- 2025: Lambs

== Production discography ==
=== 2026 ===
==== Kanye West – Bully ====
- 01. "King"
- 09. "Bully"
- 10. "Highs and Lows"

=== 2025 ===
==== The Legendary Traxster – Lambs ====
- 01. "Once Upon A Time"
- 02. "The Reign Remains"
- 03. "Silence The LAMBS"
- 04. "Bane"
- 05. "Famous Friends"
- 06. "Do You Love Me"
- 07. "I.I.L? (feat. Tia London)"
- 08. "The Code"
- 09. "Bitches"
- 10. "What I Say"
- 11. "Selfish"
- 12. "Grammy Night"
- 13. "Chevy With Sounds"
- 14. "Genuis Is Too Small (feat. Tia London)"

=== 2024 ===
==== ¥$ – Vultures 1 ====
- 01. "Stars"
- 02. "Keys to My Life"
- 03. "Paid"
- 07."Do It"
- 08. "Paperwork"
- 09. "Burn"
- 10. "Fuk Sumn"
- 12. "Carnival"

=== 2014 ===
==== Twista – Dark Horse ====
- 01. "The Dark Horse" Featuring Tyme
- 02. "I Am Sucha Mobsta"
- 06. "It's Yours" Featuring Tia London
- 11. "Nothing Like Me" Featuring Gritz
- 12. "Me And You"

=== 2013 ===
==== Java Starr – Troubled Waters ====
- 02. "Smoke"
- 04. "Pop A Crate" Featuring Lyru & Green Giant
- 05. "See Me" Featuring Green Giant
- 07. "Lost" Featuring Twista & Yukmouth
- 09. "Let Me In" Featuring Darilyn Monroe
- 12. "Dreamer" Featuring Tia London
- 14. "Champion" Featuring Siren The Goddess
- 15. "What's Pop'n" Featuring Twista
- 19. "My City" Featuring Scarface
- 20. "Gotta Do Better" Featuring Jack Freeman
- 23. "Peakin" Featuring Dollarmentary

==== Twista – Back to the Basics (EP) ====
- 01. "Intro/Freestyle"
- 02. "Ferocious"
- 05. "Put It Down"

=== 2011 ===
==== Big Sean – Finally Famous ====
- 02. "I Do It"

=== 2010 ===
==== Ludacris – Battle of the Sexes ====
- 03. "My Chick Bad" Featuring Nicki Minaj
- 14. "My Chick Bad (Remix)" Featuring Diamond, Trina and Eve

==== Twista – The Perfect Storm ====
- 01. "Darkness" Featuring DaWreck of Triple Darkness
- 03. "Make a Movie" Featuring Chris Brown
- 04. "I Do"
- 05. "2012" Featuring Tia London
- 07. "Back To The Basics"
- 08. "Hands Up, Lay Down" Featuring Waka Flocka Flame
- 09. "Call The Police" Featuring Ray J
- 09. "Give It To Me" Featuring Teala Chenae

=== 2009 ===
==== Twista – Category F5 ====
- 01. "Misunderstood" Featuring Buk
- 03. "Fire" Featuring Lil Boosie
- 05. "Yellow Light" Featuring R. Kelly
- 07. "Wetter" Featuring Erika Shevon
- 09. "Yo Body" Featuring Do or Die & Johnny P.
- 11. "Gotta Get Me One" Featuring Static Major

=== 2007 ===
==== WC – Guilty by Affiliation ====
- 11. "Side Dick"

=== 2006 ===
==== Do or Die – Get That Paper ====
- 03. "Get Yo Gunz"
- 06. "It Ain't Hard"
- 07. "On My Own""
- 08. "Get This Paper"
- 09. "Somethin' Like a Playa"
- 10. "Street Sh$"
- 11. "Up That Scratch"

==== Tech N9ne – Everready (The Religion) ====
- 15. "My World" Featuring Brotha Lynch Hung and Dalima

=== 2005 ===
==== Mariah Carey – The Emancipation of Mimi ====
"One and Only" Featuring Twista

==== Do or Die – D.O.D. ====
- 01. "Against All Odds"
- 03. "Chain of Command"
- 14. "Around Here" Featuring Malik Yusef
- 15. "Wa da da Dang" Featuring Grind
- 16. "Getcha Weight Up"
- 17. "For My Niggaz" Featuring the Legendary Traxster

=== 2004 ===
==== Twista – Kamikaze ====
- 13. "Like a 24" Featuring T.I. & Liffy Stokes

==== Cam'ron – Purple Haze ====
"Chi (Skit)/Adrenaline/Phone (Skit)" Featuring Twista & Yung Buk of Psycho Drama

=== 2003 ===
==== Do or Die – Pimpin' Ain't Dead ====
- 01. "One More Way 2 Die" Featuring E.C. Illa
- 02. "Do U?" Featuring Twista And Johnny P.
- 03. "Fantasy"
- 04. "See It Through Reality" Featuring the Legendary Traxster
- 05. "Lil' Ghetto Boy" Featuring Johnny P.
- 06. "Stateville" Featuring the Legendary Traxster And Dun D
- 07. "Don't Give No Fuck (No Love 2K3)"
- 08. "Bomb on Contact"
- 09. "Not 4 U" Featuring Johnny P.
- 11. "Who I Fuck Wit"
- 12. "Cold World"

=== 2002 ===
==== Do or Die – Back 2 the Game ====
- 02. "Ain't No Punk"
- 05. "I Got A Problem" Featuring Yung Buk
- 07. "A.M." Featuring Johnny P.
- 08. "Secret Indictment"
- 09. "Dead Homies" Featuring Johnny P.
- 10. "That's My Car"
- 11. "Menage A Trois" Featuring Johnny P.

=== 2001 ===
==== Snypaz – Livin' in the Scope ====
"Searchin"

=== 1999 ===
==== Mystikal – The Corruptor (soundtrack) ====
- 11. "I Ain't Playin"

=== 1998 ===
==== Do or Die, Danny Boy, and Johnny P – Caught Up (soundtrack) ====
- 07. "All in the Club"

==== Do or Die – Headz or Tailz ====
- 04. "Lil Sum Sum"
- 05. "Nobody's Home" Featuring Johnny P. and Danny Boy
- 07. "All in the Club" Featuring Danny Boy
- 08. "Can I" Featuring Beyond Content
- 10. "Gangsta Shit" Featuring Shock The World
- 11. "Bustin Back (Bone Thugs-n-Harmony Diss)" Featuring Lil Chilla Of Snypaz
- 13. "Who Am I" Featuring Scarface
- 14. "Caine House"

==== Twista & the Speedknot Mobstaz – Mobstability ====
- 01. "Intro"
- 02. "Crook County (Bone Thugs-n-Harmony Diss)" Featuring Newsense
- 03. "Mob Up"
- 04. "Front Porch" Featuring Danny Boy
- 05. "In Your World" Featuring Christopher Williams
- 06. "Legit Ballers"
- 07. "Mobstability"
- 08. "Party Hoes"
- 09. "Warm Embrace"
- 10. "Smoke Wit You" Featuring Baby Boy
- 11. "Loyalty" Featuring Shock The World
- 12. "Motive 4 Murder"
- 13. "Dreams"
- 14. "Rock Y'all Spot"

==== Latanya – The Big Hit Soundtrack ====
- 03. "What U On"

=== 1997 ===
==== Mystikal – Dangerous Ground (soundtrack) ====
- 06. "Mr. Shit Talker"

==== Twista – Adrenaline Rush ====
- 01. "Intro"
- 02. "Adrenaline Rush" Featuring Yung Buk of Psycho Drama
- 03. "Death Before Dishonor"
- 04. "It Feels So Good" Featuring Ms. Kane aka Eryka Kane
- 05. "Overdose"
- 06. "Mobster's Anthem" Featuring Liffy Stokes, Mayz
- 07. "Get Her In Tha Mood" (skit)
- 08. "Emotions" Featuring Johnny P
- 09. "Unsolved Mystery"
- 10. "Korrupt World" Featuring B-Hype
- 11. "Get It Wet" Featuring Ms Kane aka Eryka Kane
- 12. "No Remorse" Featuring Liffy Stokes, B-Hype, Turtle Banks, Mayz & Master Link of Qualo
- 13. "Emotions" (Remix)

==== Mystikal – Unpredictable ====
- 10. "Still Smokin"

==== Mic Geronimo – Vendetta ====
- 02. "Vendetta"

=== 1996 ===
==== Do or Die – Picture This ====
- 01. "Alpha and Omega"
- 02. "Shut 'Em Down"
- 03. "Po Pimp" Featuring Twista And Johnny P.
- 06. "Playa Like Me and You" Featuring Johnny P.
- 07. "Promise"
- 08. "6 Million"
- 09. "Search Warrant"
- 10. "Anotha One Dead And Gone"
