= Hurry Up Tomorrow (film) =

2025 film by Trey Edward Shults

- Theatrical release poster
- Directed by: Trey Edward Shults
- Written by: Trey Edward Shults; Abel Tesfaye; Reza Fahim
- Produced by: Abel Tesfaye; Reza Fahim; Kevin Turen; Harrison Kreiss
- Starring: Abel Tesfaye; Jenna Ortega; Barry Keoghan
- Cinematography: Chayse Irvin
- Edited by: Trey Edward Shults
- Music by: Abel Tesfaye; Daniel Lopatin
- Production companies: Manic Phase; Live Nation Productions
- Distributed by: Lionsgate Films
- Release date: May 16, 2025
- Running time: 105 minutes
- Country: United States
- Language: English
- Budget: $15 million
- Box office: $7.8 million

Hurry Up Tomorrow is a 2025 American psychological thriller film starring Abel "The Weeknd" Tesfaye as a fictionalized version of himself, serving as a companion piece to his 2025 album. Jenna Ortega and Barry Keoghan also star. The film was directed by Trey Edward Shults and written by Shults, Tesfaye and Reza Fahim. In the film, Tesfaye, struggling with depression and insomnia, gets pulled into an existential odyssey by a mysterious fan.

Development on Hurry Up Tomorrow began in September 2022 after psychological stress resulted in Tesfaye losing his voice during a concert. Co-writers Tesfaye and Fahim served as the film's producers, alongside Kevin Turen and Harrison Kreiss: Hurry Up Tomorrow was one of the final films produced by Turen and is dedicated to him. The film was the source of a dispute between Turen and Tesfaye's previous collaborator, Sam Levinson. It also reportedly failed to initially attract distributors. Principal photography began by February 2023 and concluded by that July.

Hurry Up Tomorrow was theatrically released by Lionsgate in the United States on May 16, 2025. It received negative reviews, was widely described as a vanity project, and bombed at the box office, grossing $7.8 million worldwide. The film earned five nominations at the 46th Golden Raspberry Awards.

== Plot ==
Music superstar Abel Tesfaye warms up and performs at a headlining concert. Afterwards, he parties and does drugs with his manager, Lee. Despite encouragement from Lee, Abel does not want to perform due to growing depression after a recent break-up leaves him emotionally unstable. Meanwhile, Anima, a fan of Tesfaye's music, sets a house on fire before driving to Los Angeles to Abel's next concert, ignoring phone calls from her mother.

Before the concert, Abel is diagnosed with muscle tension dysphonia and considers cancelling, but is convinced to perform by Lee. Before embarking onstage, Abel leaves an emotional, foul-mouthed voicemail to his ex-girlfriend, blaming her for his depression. Anima attends the concert, where Abel loses his voice and abruptly walks offstage. Anima sneaks backstage and meets Abel. Intrigued, Abel waves away security and spends the night with Anima in Pacific Park and later, at a hotel. Anima cries after Abel plays a portion of the unfinished song "Hurry Up Tomorrow", relating to its themes of loneliness and abandonment.

The following day, as Abel prepares to return to his tour, Anima answers a phone call from her distraught mother, who demands that Anima explain herself. Anima tearfully apologizes, tells her mother that she loves her, and ends the call. As Abel prepares to leave, Anima accuses him of abandoning her and pleads with him to open up emotionally to her, but he refuses. Anima knocks him unconscious with a champagne bottle. Abel has a vivid nightmare in which he wanders from the hotel room onto the empty streets, then unwillingly rides the hotel elevator to an underground tunnel, where he flees from a shrieking young woman, and finally encounters his child self singing a portion of "Hurry Up Tomorrow" in Amharic beside a fire in a snowy field.

Abel wakes up tied to the hotel bed by Anima, who claims she wants to help him confront his psychological issues and change his ways. She dances and sings along to his songs "Blinding Lights" and "Gasoline" and suggests that they were inspired by Abel's toxic relationships, drug addiction, and depression. Abel refuses to discuss the songs with her. Lee arrives to find Abel, having tracked his phone to the hotel. Anima tries to get Lee to leave, but he breaks down the door. After a violent struggle, Anima fatally stabs Lee in the neck. Anima douses Abel with gasoline, threatening to burn him if he will not be honest with her. Abel decides to be honest and sings "Hurry Up Tomorrow". She releases him from the bed and sets the room on fire before she leaves. Abel exits the hotel room and walks down the hallway, which leads him directly backstage before a concert. He stares at his reflection in a mirror.

== Cast ==
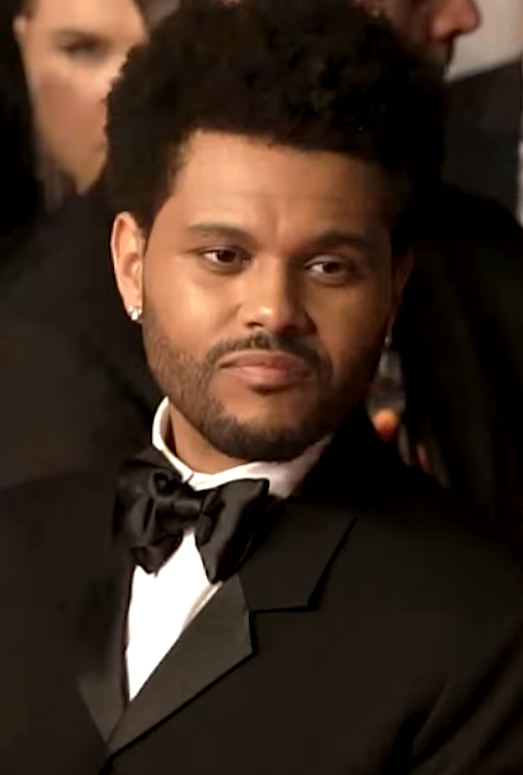
The Weeknd stars as himself in the film.

- Abel Tesfaye as a fictionalized version of himself
  - Ivan Troy as young Abel
- Jenna Ortega as Anima, a mysterious stalker fan of the Weeknd
- Barry Keoghan as Lee, Abel's manager
- Riley Keough as:
  - Girl on Voicemail
  - Anima's mother (voice)
- Metro Boomin as a fictionalized version of himself
- Belly as a fictionalized version of himself
- Gaspard Augé as a fictionalized version of himself
- Xavier de Rosnay as a fictionalized version of himself
- Paul L. Davis as Lavi, the head of a security group that works for Abel

== Production ==
=== Development ===
Trey Edward Shults directed and edited Hurry Up Tomorrow. He wrote the script with Abel "the Weeknd" Tesfaye and Reza Fahim, with its story based on the Weeknd's sixth studio album. Tesfaye and Fahim also produced the film through Manic Phase with Kevin Turen and Harrison Kreiss. Shults, Jenna Ortega, Michael Rapino, Ryan Kroft, Wassim "Sal" Slaiby and Harrison Huffman served as its executive producers. Chayse Irvin handled the cinematography, while Daniel Lopatin composed the score with Tesfaye. It was one of the last projects Turen worked on before his death in November 2023.

Tesfaye, Ortega, and Barry Keoghan signed on to star in Hurry Up Tomorrow. It marked Tesfaye's first film leading role, having previously made a cameo appearance as himself in Uncut Gems (2019) and starred in the HBO television series The Idol (2023); which he also co-created. Although Ortega and Keoghan were weighing several offers following their respective breakthrough years, production was greenlit after they pledged their commitments. Live Nation Entertainment financed the film on a budget of $15 million.

The film and the album was inspired by a real-life incident at the After Hours til Dawn Tour show in September 2022 at SoFi Stadium, in which Tesfaye lost his voice while performing and was forced to stop the show, caused not by physical injury but from psychological stress. The album track "I Can't Fucking Sing" also references this event with dialogue from the film.

=== Filming ===
When Deadline Hollywood announced Hurry Up Tomorrow on February 28, 2023, principal photography had already begun. It was shot by Canadian cinematographer Chayse Irvin on 35 mm, 16 mm, and Super 8 film, marking his first collaboration with Shults.

=== Post-production ===
Turen's longtime relationship with filmmaker Sam Levinson, who also worked on The Idol, reportedly deteriorated after Levinson felt "betrayed" that Turen was attached to the project without him knowing. Turen contended that he had told Levinson's wife, Ashley Levinson, about Hurry Up Tomorrow, but she expressed no interest and never mentioned it to her husband. Ashley denied knowing anything about the film.

In April 2025, Tesfaye clarified that the film was conceived and developed before the album, which was produced and completed during the film's post-production scoring process.

== Music ==
Hurry Up Tomorrow (Original Motion Picture Score)

Soundtrack album by the Weeknd and Oneohtrix Point Never
- Released: July 11, 2025
- Length: 84:45
- Labels: XO; Republic
- Producers: The Weeknd; Oneohtrix Point Never; Cirkut; DaHeala; Max Martin; Metro Boomin; Mike Dean; Ojivolta; Oscar Holter; Pharrell Williams; Teddy Fantum; Thabo; Twisco

the Weeknd chronology
Hurry Up Tomorrow (2025)	Hurry Up Tomorrow (Original Motion Picture Score) (2025)

Oneohtrix Point Never chronology
Again (2023)	Hurry Up Tomorrow (Original Motion Picture Score) (2025)	Tranquilizer (2025)

The film's soundtrack, Hurry Up Tomorrow (Original Motion Picture Score), was released on July 11, 2025. Although it was initially slated for both digital and physical release, it ultimately became available only in physical format, on LP and CD. The soundtrack is a collaborative effort between The Weeknd and Oneohtrix Point Never, featuring 16 original instrumental tracks composed by the duo, alongside ten songs from The Weeknd's own Hurry Up Tomorrow (2025) album.

Tracks 1–16 all written and produced by the Weeknd and Oneohtrix Point Never. Tracks 17–26 can be found on Hurry Up Tomorrow (2025) as tracks 2, 4, 7, 13, 15, 17 and 19–22, respectively.

Side one
No.	Title	Length
1.	"Please Leave a Message"	2:16
2.	"Anima Pt. 1"	3:54
3.	"Gas Station"	1:03
4.	"Dance Until We're Skin and Bones"	1:57
5.	"It's Mostly Psychological"	0:45
6.	"Sky Is Falling"	1:59
7.	"Heartbeat Slower"	2:20
8.	"We'll Take It Backstage"	4:23
9.	"Muted"	1:40

Side two
No.	Title	Length
10.	"Close Encounter"	2:18
11.	"I Feel Like I Know You"	2:51
12.	"Champagne Solves Everything"	1:40
13.	"In Too Deep"	5:50
14.	"Can You Hear Me Knocking?"	0:41
15.	"Anima Pt. 2"	4:16
16.	"Tomorrow's Coming"	3:45

Side three
No.	Title	Writer(s)	Producer(s)	Length
17.	"Cry for Me"	Abel Tesfaye; Micheal Dean; Leland Wayne; Ahmad Balshe; Karen Patterson; Curtis Williams	The Weeknd; Dean; Metro Boomin; Sage Skolfield^{[v]}	3:44
18.	"São Paulo" (with Anitta)	Tesfaye; Larissa Machado; Tatiana Lourenço; Dean; Sean Solymar; Washington Vaz; Agustinho dos Santos; André Viegas; Everton de Araujo; Flavio de Almeida; Marcelo Nei Leal	The Weeknd; Dean; Solymar^{[c]}	5:02
19.	"Open Hearts"	Tesfaye; Max Martin; Oscar Holter	Martin; Holter	3:54
20.	"Timeless" (with Playboi Carti)	Tesfaye; Jordan Carter; Pharrell Williams; Mark Williams; Raul Cubina; Dean; Jarrod Morgan; Kobe Hood; Tariq Sharrieff; Devon Chisolm	P. Williams; Ojivolta; Dean; Twisco; BbyKobe^{[u]}; Blssd^{[u]}	4:16
21.	"Take Me Back to LA"	Tesfaye; Dean; Jason Quenneville	The Weeknd; Dean; DaHeala; Solymar^{[c]}; Tommy Rush^{[c]}; Skolfield^{[c]}^{[v]}	4:14

Side four
No.	Title	Writer(s)	Producer(s)	Length
22.	"Give Me Mercy"	Tesfaye; Martin; Holter; Daniel Lopatin	The Weeknd; Martin; Holter; OPN^{[a]}; Ilya^{[a]}	3:36
23.	"The Abyss" (with Lana Del Rey)	Tesfaye; Elizabeth Grant; Dean; Patrick Greenaway	The Weeknd; Dean; Greenaway^{[c]}; OPN^{[a]}; Skolfield^{[v]}	4:42
24.	"Red Terror"	Tesfaye; Lopatin	The Weeknd; OPN; Dean; Cirkut; Salon^{[a]}; Skolfield^{[v]}	3:51
25.	"Without a Warning"	Tesfaye; Thabo Publicover; Tewodros Fantu; Lopatin; Holter; Darryl Howard; Isaac Brown; Giorgio Moroder	The Weeknd; Thabo; Teddy Fantum; OPN^{[c]}; Holter^{[c]}; Dean^{[c]}; Skolfield^{[v]}	4:57
26.	"Hurry Up Tomorrow"	Tesfaye	Dean; OPN; DaHeala; Salon^{[c]}; Skolfield^{[v]}	4:51
Total length:				84:45

Notes

- ^{^[a]} signifies an additional producer
- ^{^[c]} signifies a co-producer
- ^{^[u]} signifies an uncredited producer
- ^{^[v]} signifies a vocal producer.

Sample credits

- "Cry for Me" contains a sample of "I Wanna Be the One", written by Curtis Fitzgerald Williams and Karen Patterson, as performed by The S.O.S. Band.
- "São Paulo" contains an interpolation of "Montagem Pidona", written by Flavio Seraphim de Almeida, Everton Ramos de Araujo, Marcelo Nei Leal, Tatiana dos Santos Lourenço, Agustinho Raphael dos Santos, Washington Luis Costa Vaz, and Andre Luiz Viegasand, as performed by Tati Quebra Barraco.
- "Without a Warning" contains a sample of "Hurry Up Tomorrow", written by Darryl Howard and Isaac Brown, as performed by The Nu'rons.

== Release ==
In November 2024, Lionsgate Films announced their acquisition of worldwide distribution rights to Hurry Up Tomorrow. The film was released theatrically in the United States on May 16, 2025.

It was subsequently released on premium video on demand services on June 6, 2025.

== Reception ==
=== Box office ===
As of July 11, 2025, Hurry Up Tomorrow has grossed $5.2 million in the United States and Canada and $2.5 million in other territories, for a worldwide total of $7.8 million.

In the United States and Canada, Hurry Up Tomorrow was released alongside Final Destination Bloodlines, and was projected to gross $5–9 million from 2,020 theatres in its opening weekend. It made $1.65 million from preview screenings: $1.3 million on Wednesday and $350,000 on Thursday. The film went on to flop at the box office, placing sixth with an opening of $3.2 million. Deadline Hollywood noted that Lionsgate "really tried" to sell Hurry Up Tomorrow to exhibitors with an extensive marketing campaign, which included a strong presence at CinemaCon, but its box office performance was a "complete rejection" from moviegoers.

=== Critical response ===
Critics dismissed the film as an "egomaniacal" and "navel-gazing" vanity project for Tesfaye, (Note: Attributed to multiple references:) and saw it as an extended music video created simply to promote its companion album. On the review aggregator website Rotten Tomatoes, 14% of 90 critics' reviews are positive, with an average rating of 3.6/10. The website's consensus reads: "On second thought, let's fast-forward to the workweek." Metacritic, which uses a weighted average, assigned the film a score of 29 out of 100, based on 25 critics, indicating "generally unfavorable" reviews. Audiences polled by CinemaScore gave the film an average grade of "C-" on an A+ to F scale, while those surveyed by PostTrak gave the film an average rating of 1/2 out of 5 stars, with 34% saying they would definitely recommend it.

Frank Scheck for The Hollywood Reporter found Hurry Up Tomorrow to be "unbearably pretentious" with a screenplay "so devoid of humor and self-awareness that it makes such similarly misbegotten musician star vehicles [such as] Renaldo and Clara (1978), Under the Cherry Moon (1986) and Give My Regards to Broad Street (1984) seem like masterpieces". The Daily Beast's Nick Schager echoed his sentiments, writing that the "feature-length ego stroke of monumental hubris" instantly assumed "pole position in the race for the year's worst movie". Jordan Hoffman of Entertainment Weekly described the film as "nearly plot-free, self-indulgent, overly serious, and, worst of all, just dull". The Toronto Star's Alexander Mooney said the film was "remarkable in its ceaseless and shameless capacity for failure, constantly finding new and innovative ways to fall flat on its face". In the headline for his CBC News review, Jackson Weaver wrote: "[Tesfaye] could've gone to therapy. Instead, he made Hurry Up Tomorrow."

Scheck commended Ortega's and Barry Keoghan's "hard-working efforts" in investing their "thinly written" characters with "intense" energy. Todd Gilchrist of Variety thought that although the film "bears all the signs of pop star hubris masquerading as artistic candor," Keoghan and Ortega delivered "game performances to prop up the budding thespian". The A.V. Club's Jesse Hassenger found Ortega to be "the only person in the movie anyone would ever want to spend any time with". He complimented her erratic behavior and "wonderfully expressive" face, which he described as a "bold-lined comic-book drawing come to life; compared to the rest of Hurry Up Tomorrow, regarding images of Ortega shot on film is a splendid use of time". IndieWire's Charles Bramesco, in a more critical analysis, wrote that Tesfaye and Ortega modeled two opposing modes of an "imitative, hollow performance" with "varying notions of good acting": Ortega "doesn't understand how or why" to demonstrate stoicism and inexpressiveness while Tesfaye channeled Robert De Niro in Raging Bull (1980) "just without the Method behind his mannerisms".

More positively, G. Allen Johnson of the San Francisco Chronicle described Hurry Up Tomorrow as "a risk-taking experience, a David Lynchian fever dream of a movie that's as visually marvelous as it is head-scratching". He considered the film to be a "Purple Rain for the Euphoria generation," acknowledging that the film is imperfect, but applauded the manner in which it "questions, probes and challenges" viewers. Madison Bloom of Pitchfork, on the other hand, believed that Tesfaye was still "caught in the strangulating grasp of his self-made mythology". She compared Hurry Up Tomorrow to Misery (1990), "a film that raises complex questions about fame, pop culture, and the extremes of fandom. Unfortunately, these ideas are just kind of slapped on the surface of Hurry Up Tomorrow, which fails to penetrate deeper into the lives and motivations of its characters".

=== Accolades ===
Award	Date of ceremony	Category	Nominee(s)	Result	Ref.
Hawaii Film Critics Society	January 12, 2026	Worst Film of 2025	Hurry Up Tomorrow	Won	
MTV Video Music Awards	September 7, 2025	Best Long Form Video	Hurry Up Tomorrow	Nominated	
MTV Video Music Awards	September 7, 2025	Best Visual Effects	Zeke Faust	Nominated	
Golden Raspberry Awards	March 14, 2026	Worst Picture	Reza Fahim, Harrison Kreiss, Abel Tesfaye, and Kevin Turen	Nominated	
Golden Raspberry Awards	March 14, 2026	Worst Director	Trey Edward Shults	Nominated	
Golden Raspberry Awards	March 14, 2026	Worst Screenplay	Trey Edward Shults, Abel Tesfaye, and Reza Fahim	Nominated	
Golden Raspberry Awards	March 14, 2026	Worst Actor	Abel "The Weeknd" Tesfaye	Nominated	
Golden Raspberry Awards	March 14, 2026	Worst Screen Couple	The Weeknd and his colossal ego	Nominated	
