= Hurry Up Tomorrow =

2025 studio album by the Weeknd

- First pressing and digital cover

Studio album by the Weeknd
- Released: January 31, 2025
- Recorded: 2020 – January 2025
- Studios: Conway (Los Angeles); MXM (Stockholm, Los Angeles); House Mouse (Stockholm); Light Sonic Division (Woodland Hills); Jungle City (New York); Other Island (Miami Beach); Louis Vuitton (Paris)
- Genres: Synth-pop; R&B
- Length: 84:39
- Labels: XO; Republic
- Producers: The Weeknd; Che' Fuego 3000; Cirkut; Matt Cohn; DaHeala; Mike Dean; Teddy Fantum; Oscar Holter; Johnny Jewel; Peter Lee Johnson; Justice; Max Martin; Metro Boomin; Giorgio Moroder; Ojivolta; OPN; Tommy Parker; Prince85; Nathan Salon; Tommy Brown; Thabo; Travis Scott; Twisco; Pharrell Williams

The Weeknd chronology
The Idol Episode 5 Part 2 (Music from the HBO Original Series) (2023)	Hurry Up Tomorrow (2025)	Hurry Up Tomorrow (Original Motion Picture Score) (2025)

Alternative cover
- Complete edition cover (Note: Primary artwork for all digital releases until April 29, 2026, when all digital editions changed to the first pressing edition cover shown above.)

Singles from Hurry Up Tomorrow
- 1. "Timeless" Released: September 27, 2024; 2. "São Paulo" Released: October 30, 2024; 3. "Cry for Me" Released: February 4, 2025

Hurry Up Tomorrow is the sixth studio album by the Canadian singer and songwriter the Weeknd. It was released through XO and Republic Records on January 31, 2025. It also serves as a companion piece to the film of the same name. The standard album contains guest appearances from Anitta, Justice, Travis Scott, Florence and the Machine, Future, Playboi Carti, Giorgio Moroder, and Lana Del Rey, with a bonus edition containing an additional appearance from Swedish House Mafia. Production was primarily handled by the Weeknd himself and his regular collaborators including Cirkut, DaHeala, Max Martin, Mike Dean, Metro Boomin, Prince85 and OPN, alongside various other producers.

Hurry Up Tomorrow is primarily a synth-pop and R&B album, while exploring a wide variety of genres such as Brazilian funk and hip-hop. The album is the final installment of a trilogy following the Weeknd's previous two studio albums, After Hours (2020) and Dawn FM (2022). The Weeknd has hinted Hurry Up Tomorrow may be his final album under his stage name, and revealed that it was partly inspired by losing his voice while on tour in 2022. Hurry Up Tomorrow was supported by the singles "Timeless", "São Paulo", and "Cry for Me". To promote the album, a co-headlining extension of his tour with Playboi Carti kicked off in summer 2025 and ended in the fall of 2026.

Hurry Up Tomorrow opened with first-week sales of 490,500 album-equivalent units in the U.S. and debuted at number one on the Billboard 200, marking the Weeknd's fifth number-one album on the chart. Internationally, it topped the charts in 16 countries, including in Canada, France, Norway, Belgium, Australia, the United Kingdom, and New Zealand. The album received positive reviews from critics, with praise for its production, lyrical content and vocal performances; some critics described Hurry Up Tomorrow as a "powerful finale" to the trilogy and alter ego of the Weeknd.

== Background ==
On March 25, 2020, the Weeknd previewed five unreleased tracks during an Instagram livestream, some of which were reportedly intended for After Hours (2020), which was released five days prior. Three songs—"Nothing Compares", "Missed You", and "Final Lullaby"—were later added as bonus tracks in the deluxe edition of the album. However, the other tracks, "Take Me Back to LA" and "The Abyss" (then listed as "Regular" or "Hold My Heart"), did not appear on After Hours or its successor, Dawn FM (2022).

On January 10, 2022, three days after the release of Dawn FM, the Weeknd confirmed a follow-up album by tweeting: "I wonder... did you know you're experiencing a new trilogy?". This referenced his 2012 compilation album Trilogy, which contained remixes or remasters of the songs from his 2011 mixtapes House of Balloons, Thursday, and Echoes of Silence. It also confirmed that After Hours and Dawn FM are part of a trilogy, which would be concluded with the sequel to the latter.

Development on Hurry Up Tomorrow reportedly began closely following the release of Dawn FM in 2022. In January 2023, the Weeknd confirmed recording sessions had taken place for the album, while also stating he has "definitely been inspired". On September 3, 2022, the intended final date of the North American leg of the After Hours til Dawn Tour, the Weeknd lost his voice during his performance at SoFi Stadium in Inglewood: the show was rescheduled to November 26 and an extra date was added for the following day. He would later attribute the incident to exhaustion resulting from scheduling conflicts between the After Hours til Dawn Tour and the TV series The Idol (2023). The album was worked on up until release. In a January 2025 interview with Variety, the Weeknd revealed that "a good chunk" of the album was finished by September 2022, but his touring incident caused the album and its tie-in film to be "overhauled". The incident also influenced the Weeknd's decision to drop his stage name, potentially transitioning to making music under his real name, Abel Tesfaye:

The [upcoming] album is probably my last hurrah as the Weeknd. This is something that I have to do. As the Weeknd, I've said everything I can say. I'll still make music, maybe as Abel, maybe as the Weeknd. But I still want to kill the Weeknd. And I will. Eventually. I'm definitely trying to shed that skin and be reborn.

== Pre-release promotion ==
=== June 2023–May 2024: Early teasers and promotion ===
In June 2023, the Weeknd stated in a Variety interview: "I'm finishing the third part of this saga, of this trilogy. The name of it will come out soon." Recording therefore coincided with his musical and acting work for The Idol (2023) and the After Hours til Dawn Tour. The Weeknd continued to work on the album after this, sharing images of recording sessions between September 2023 and February 2024 at Conway Recording Studios in Los Angeles, alongside frequent collaborators Oneohtrix Point Never, Mike Dean and Metro Boomin, among others.

On January 7, 2024, the second anniversary of Dawn FM, the Weeknd teased the upcoming album by posting the cover art for his previous two albums, along with a black slide featuring a white question mark in the centre. The slide was captioned with the number "3", indicating that the upcoming album would be the third in a trilogy. Later that month, he teased a possible collaboration with French electronic music duo Justice multiple times, who contributed to "Wake Me Up".

On February 9, 2024, the Weeknd shared a picture from a recording studio and a written-down text "Everything fades...". On his birthday, February 16, he teased the album by posting pictures of the Los Angeles Theatre with text on its marquee: "This Story Has Three Chapters—The Greatest Trilogy Known to Man." On February 23, in three separate messages, he tweeted "Everything Will Fade". In the weeks following this message, he deleted most of his posts on X.

On March 1, 2024, American record producer Mike Dean, a frequent collaborator of the Weeknd, celebrated his 59th birthday with a special concert at the Wiltern Theatre in Los Angeles. The Weeknd made a guest appearance, performing a reimagined version of "Take Me Back to LA", which he had previously teased on an Instagram livestream in March 2020. He also debuted a cover of "In Heaven", which originally featured in the 1977 film Eraserhead. American record producer Metro Boomin confirmed to be working on "a lot of stuff" for the upcoming album on May 22.

=== June–August 2024: Visual and conceptual teasers ===
A collaboration with American technological company Apple Inc. was teased on June 1, 2024, which was confirmed by the company nine days later for later that year. On June 16, the Weeknd shared a photo of a stop motion figure depicting himself as a baby. On July 2, he teased the first visuals from the upcoming album, displaying a person being half his current age self, half himself as a child, with the reflection of a flame in his eyes, and a sinister forest. This was followed three days later by more visuals, displaying an unrecognizable person wearing a cape, on top of stairs in a purple-lighted room, seen through the crack of a door. On July 7, he shared a quote from Abode in Heaven: Paul and Life After Death in 2 Corinthians 5:1–10: "Humanity in its present form is frail, deteriorating, and weak. To share in eternal life, however, our bodies must be transformed."

In July and August 2024, the Weeknd shared a trio of CGI teasers, centred on a young boy, presumably representing a young Abel Tesfaye, alongside his characters from other albums, including Trilogy (2012), After Hours (2020), and Dawn FM (2022).

- "There Are Three Chapters in this Tale", shared on July 18, which showcased the story of After Hours and Dawn FM, accompanied by various songs from these albums.
- "When you gaze long enough into the abyss, the abyss gazes also into you", shared on July 23, marked the resurfacing of "The Abyss", which he had previously teased on Instagram live in March 2020. The teaser's title is a quote by Friedrich Nietzsche.
- "Unprepared Certainty", shared on August 6, featured the first official teasing of "Wake Me Up" and "Runaway".

On August 7, 2024, Universal announced that the Weeknd would be returning to Universal Studios Hollywood as a haunted house for that year's Halloween Horror Nights event, after a similar event tied to his album After Hours, in 2022. The Weeknd: Nightmare Trilogy is inspired by his albums from the new trilogy. The house featured music by the Weeknd, scored by Mike Dean. From Hurry Up Tomorrow, then-unreleased songs "Take Me Back to LA" and "São Paulo" could be heard. The event took place from September 5 to November 3, 2024. The song "São Paulo", without known title at the time, was again teased on August 31, through an advert for an NFL Brasil Game in São Paulo.

=== September–December 2024: Album announcement, singles and performances ===
The Weeknd announced and sold out a special one-night concert in São Paulo, Brazil, on September 7, 2024, featuring an elaborate stage design inspired by his Ethiopian heritage and religious themes. The show exclusively showcased songs from his trilogy, including nine unreleased tracks, with guest appearances by Anitta and Playboi Carti. The concert received positive reviews and introduced a new stage setup that was used for subsequent performances. The album title Hurry Up Tomorrow was officially announced on September 4, a few days before the show, through a video with a written story:

Yesterday was fourteen years ago. We held our breath, falling into a shimmering sea in the after hours of the night. Attempted to cleanse the wounds with melodies and lights, a bulletproof bandage to shield what lies beneath. In a place where the seasons never changed, where time ceased to exist. But therein lays the problem. Today has felt like and endless spin. I keep distorting the truth, immune to the dizziness, numb to the nausea. What lies beneath – screams in silence. I look in the mirror and feel both old and new, stuck in limbo and unable to move. I still haven't faced myself. More songs could help but what do I have left to say? Woe is me in my gilded cage, right? The very thing that once made me invincible failed me on the world stage. A new trauma surfaced, opening floodgates. A new path awaits. When today ends, I'll discover who I am. Hurry Up Tomorrow.

Hours before the concert on September 7, the album cover was revealed, with album preorders on vinyl and CDs subsequently being opened through the XO webstore. Four alternative edition vinyl LPs were made available for pre-order between October and December 2024, each featuring exclusive artwork by one artist. The album's intended lead single "Dancing in the Flames" was released on September 13.

The Weeknd was announced as part of the 2024 iHeartRadio Music Festival lineup, marking his return since 2017. On September 21, he performed a 20-minute set in Las Vegas, featuring hits from After Hours and Dawn FM, along with "Dancing in the Flames" and the then-unreleased track "São Paulo" from Hurry Up Tomorrow. Six days later, the album's intended second single, "Timeless", featuring Playboi Carti, was released, followed by the intended third single, "São Paulo", featuring Anitta, on October 30.

The After Hours til Dawn Tour continued during the pre-release campaign with a leg in Australia, featuring two shows in both Melbourne and Sydney. During the Sydney concerts on October 22 and 23, the Weeknd performed a new song, "Open Hearts", which was later released exclusively on the Apple Vision Pro on November 14, and later released to streaming along with the rest of the album, on January 31, 2025.

On November 27, 2024, exactly five years after the new trilogy began with the release of After Hours' lead single "Heartless", the Weeknd announced January 24, 2025, as the album's original release date. He also revealed plans for a "one-night only" concert at the Rose Bowl stadium in Pasadena, California, scheduled for the day after the album's release. The concert would feature "never-before-seen production" and a stage designed to cover the stadium's entire floor. On December 2, 2024, the show was sold out in under one hour, as over 300,000 fans attempted to buy tickets.

On December 17, 2024, the Weeknd performed at Spotify's first Billions Club Live, celebrating his record-breaking 25 songs with at least a billion streams, and performing "Timeless" and "São Paulo" from Hurry Up Tomorrow, and "In Heaven", with a concert film released on Spotify on January 7, 2025. During the show, he announced the upcoming album would be accompanied by a new tour and film in 2025. On December 20, the latter's release date of May 16, 2025, was announced. At the end of December 2024, billboards in major cities appeared, appearing to say "The Weeknd Is Near", with blank spaces in place of three letters, so they read "The End Is Near". In January 2025, during an interview for Variety, the artist reiterated that Hurry Up Tomorrow could be his final project under the pseudonym "the Weeknd".

=== January 2025: Los Angeles wildfires impact and final marketing push ===
On January 13, the Weeknd announced that the album's release had been postponed by a week, moving to January 31. Additionally, the one-off show at the Rose Bowl, originally scheduled for January 25, was cancelled. Both decisions were made "out of respect and concern for the people of Los Angeles County" who were dealing with severe wildfires. Apart from that announcement, the Weeknd remained completely silent about the upcoming album, instead focusing solely on the wildfires through his social media. Proceeds from the album track "Take Me Back to LA" will be donated to LA Regional Food Bank, who are providing emergency food assistance to those directly impacted by the LA wildfires.

The final marketing push began twelve days before the release, with the Weeknd counting down the days on his social platforms. Ten days before the album's release, he revealed the existence of hurryuptomorrow.club, a website with password-protected album-related information, and a 48-hour countdown timer. The password would be shared with those who provided their contact details, when the timer reached zero. The same day, the Weeknd also tweeted "All in your veins in ten days... This one is gonna kick". On January 23, the website's password was shared, which gave access to a XO/Opium webstore containing album-related merchandising and a new Hurry Up Tomorrow 00XO edition with two bonus tracks, to be released digitally only alongside the album's standard edition. The website was made available without a password on January 25.

Seven days before the album's release, the Weeknd shared a visual teaser featuring snippets from music videos spanning his entire career in chronological order. The teaser concluded with clips from the music videos for "Open Hearts" and "Red Terror", both unreleased at the time. The nearly four-minute teaser was set to "Rolling Stone", a track from his 2011 mixtape Thursday.

On January 24, an ABC press release revealed that the Weeknd would perform on American late-night talk show Jimmy Kimmel Live! on January 30, one day before the album's release. On the same day, he updated the caption on his post revealing the standard edition album cover, adding "First Pressing", suggesting that a new cover might be in the works. On January 28, it was announced that a New York City pop-up shop, created in partnership with Spotify, will open for the first three days following the album's release.

The Weeknd shared a series of three black-and-white snippets of "Opening Night" and "Red Terror" in the days leading up to the release—one each on four, three, and two days prior. He referred to the upcoming album as "the final act", "curtains up", and "...".

== Release ==
On the evening of January 30, the Weeknd performed "Open Hearts" on Jimmy Kimmel Live!. Just before his performance, he unveiled the official album cover, revealing that the previously known design was exclusive to the first-pressing vinyl and CD editions. The album, Hurry Up Tomorrow, was released shortly after, on January 31, 2025. A total of 25 songs were released: 22 standard tracks, plus three bonus tracks ("Runaway", "Society" and "Closing Night"). The album was made available in four versions:

- Complete Edition: includes 22 standard tracks. Initially only a digital release, physical edition released on May 9, 2025.
- 00XO Edition (digital only): includes 22 standard tracks, plus two bonus tracks "Runaway" and "Society".
- First Pressing Edition (physical only): features nine selected songs from the 22 standard tracks, plus two bonus tracks "Runaway" and "Society".
- Pharrell Williams Edition (digital only): released on February 5, 2025, it includes 22 standard tracks, and the new bonus track "Closing Night", with Swedish House Mafia.

Of the nine new songs performed at the São Paulo show, six made it onto the standard edition tracklist. "Runaway" was included in the album's First Pressing Edition, and as a bonus track on the 00XO and Pharrell Williams editions. The originally intended lead single, "Dancing in the Flames", along with "In Heaven", were left off of all album versions, with the latter remaining unreleased. As a result, "Timeless" and "São Paulo" became the album's lead and second single, respectively. "Cry for Me" was sent to US contemporary and rhythmic radio as the album's third single on February 4, 2025.

== Composition and themes ==
Variety described Hurry Up Tomorrow prior to its release, stating it "includes plenty of the sleek, chrome-plated hooks that have characterized many of the Weeknd's biggest hits. But to a degree he hasn't really done before, it also includes explorations of other genres: classic R&B, straight pop, acoustic guitars, fast beats and an epic, sweeping song, probably the finale, that recalls Prince's 'Purple Rain'". The album delves into existential and self-referential themes, while also exploring death, redemption, and rebirth. The latter theme is accentuated by different depictions of birth (in the "São Paulo" music video), and the Weeknd as a baby, through shared CGI teasers, stop motion figures and pictures. Fans have speculated that the new trilogy is inspired by Dante Alighieri's Divine Comedy, reflecting its themes, symbolism, and narrative arc. According to this theory, the albums represent a journey through Hell (After Hours), Purgatory (Dawn FM), and Paradise (Hurry Up Tomorrow).

On February 29, 2024, it was confirmed that Anton Tammi, one of After Hours' directors, would contribute to the upcoming album. In an interview with Billboard Brasil on September 6, 2024, the Weeknd revealed that a "central song" was composed in São Paulo, with the album exploring different sounds, which he nicknamed "frankenstein". In the same publication, a collaboration with Brazilian singer Anitta (what would later become "São Paulo") was confirmed after months of rumours, although the article was later removed by Billboard.

The moment the Weeknd lost his voice during the September 2022 concert greatly impacted his artistic vision for his upcoming album and further career. In an interview with Variety in January 2025, he stated "I really needed to sit down and figure out my life, to understand what happened, face it, learn something new and start again. I had a kind of a mental breakdown, which is pretty much what this new album is about." Italian composer and music producer Giorgio Moroder, known for his film scores like Midnight Express and Scarface, was a major influence on the album, particularly for the "operatic synths" used in the latter. The Weeknd himself described the album as "gothic" and "operatic". Moroder told Variety in January 2025: "I'm thrilled to continue bridging the gap with Abel between the past and the future, creating something timeless yet innovative." The album features Moroder's contributions on keyboards, arrangements, and vocals.

== Title and artwork ==
=== Album title ===
The album takes its name from the song "Hurry Up Tomorrow" by the soul group the Nu'rons, a track sampled on "Without a Warning". The title reflects the Weeknd's deep personal desire to retire his moniker and continue his career under his real name, Abel Tesfaye. "Tomorrow" symbolizes the future moment when this transition takes place. Impatiently waiting for it to happen, the Weeknd wants "tomorrow" to "hurry up":

It's a headspace I've gotta get into that I just don't have any more desire for. [...] You have a persona, but then you have the competition of it all. It becomes this rat race: more accolades, more success, more shows, more albums, more awards and more No. 1s. It never ends until you end it. [...] Everything needs to feel like a challenge. And for me right now, the Weeknd, whatever that is, it's been mastered. No one's gonna do the Weeknd better than me, and I'm not gonna do it better than what it is right now. I think I've overcome every challenge as this persona [...] but I just want to know what comes after. I want to know what tomorrow looks like.

In a January 2025 interview with Variety, he revealed that his decision was driven by the voice-loss incident during his September 2022 concert.

Part of me actually was thinking, "You lost your voice because it's done; you said what you had to say. Don't overstay at the party—you can end it now and live a happy life." You know? Put the bow on it: Hurry Up Tomorrow? Now we're here. When is the right time to leave, if not at your peak? Once you understand who I am too much, then it's time to pivot.

He attributed the issue to exhaustion and stress caused by scheduling overhauls for both the After Hours til Dawn Tour and his TV series The Idol. The album titles of the new trilogy refer to three chronological points in time, with the "after hours" being 3 a.m. to 5 a.m., "dawn" being the brightening of the sky just before sunrise, and "tomorrow" the time after sunrise.

During the final months of the After Hours til Dawn Tour, he revealed in an interview with GQ Hong Kong that he had reconsidered his decision to retire the moniker, stating that he was "not stepping away from anything" and that "I'm going to keep doing this for as long as I possibly can. The Weeknd isn't going anywhere."

=== Album covers ===
The standard edition album cover of Hurry Up Tomorrow features Tesfaye's blistered, fire-scarred face, seemingly screaming in pain. The album title and tracklist surround him, reminiscent of the covers from his 2011 career-starting trilogy of mixtapes. The image is a still from the movie of the same name.

The album cover for the first pressing version of Hurry Up Tomorrow features a portrait of Tesfaye in a black tank top, gazing at the camera and seemingly holding back tears. It represents Tesfaye's character from the Hurry Up Tomorrow film. According to its official trailer, here he stares straight into the mirror teared up. Four different vinyl pressings of the album featuring alternate covers made available for pre-order between October and December 2024. The covers were illustrated by Jean-Michel Basquiat, Frank Miller, Hajime Sorayama, and Harmony Korine. Both the 00XO and Pharrell Williams edition of the album feature alternative covers designed by XO Records in cooperation with Opium and Williams, respectively.

== Promotion ==
=== Performances ===
On July 17, 2024, the Weeknd announced a special one-night only concert in São Paulo, Brazil featuring "never-before-seen production", taking place on September 7. The show sold out in under one hour on July 22, 2024, with 420,000 fans attempting to buy tickets. In an Instagram story posted on August 15, the Weeknd revealed he would only perform songs from the new trilogy, meaning that the performance of any unreleased song would seemingly confirm its inclusion on the new album. A trailer released on August 20 revealed the show would stream live on YouTube. The 90-minute concert was held in the MorumBIS Stadium, where the Weeknd performed songs exclusively from After Hours, Dawn FM and Hurry Up Tomorrow, debuting nine then-unreleased songs:

- Six previously teased songs: "Wake Me Up", "Take Me Back to LA", "Runaway", "The Abyss", "In Heaven" (contains an interpolation of the song of the same name), and "São Paulo" (with Anitta).
- Three new songs: "Without a Warning", "Dancing in the Flames", and "Timeless" (with Playboi Carti).

Both Anitta and Playboi Carti joined the Weeknd on stage to perform their respective collaborations with him. The stage design maintained the catwalk-style setup that spanned the length of the pitch, from previous After Hours til Dawn Tour performances. Notable religious elements were incorporated into the stage design for this leg of the tour. Midway down the catwalk, a church inspired by the rock-hewn structures of Lalibela was constructed, likely paying homage to the Weeknd's Ethiopian heritage. The church featured multiple levels, enabling the Weeknd to perform on its roof, an intermediate floor, and its ground level. The stage design now also featured a large video screen and illuminated walkway, which ended in a design resembling a Christian cross. The Weeknd premiered wearing a black robe with gold trim, a costume that became a staple for subsequent performances. The new stage design was also used for subsequent touring shows. The concert received positive critical reception, with The Guardian awarding it 4 out of 5 stars in their review.

On August 23, 2024, it was reported that the Weeknd was added to the lineup of the upcoming iHeartRadio Music Festival, for the first time since 2017. On September 21, 2024, the Weeknd performed at the festival in Las Vegas, atop a pyramid formed by red-veiled dancers. In a 20-minute set, he performed "Blinding Lights" and "Save Your Tears" from After Hours, "Take My Breath" and "Sacrifice" from Dawn FM, "Dancing in the Flames", and then-unreleased "São Paulo" from Hurry Up Tomorrow.

On December 11, 2024, it was announced the Weeknd would be performing at Spotify's first ever Billions Club Live on December 17. The exclusive, invite-only performance at Santa Monica's Barker Hangar was reserved for 2,000 of his top listeners on the platform, celebrating his record as the artist with the most songs surpassing one billion streams. During a 70-minute concert, he performed most of his 24 tracks that had reached the milestone, along with "In Heaven" and songs from Hurry Up Tomorrow: "Timeless", and "São Paulo". On January 7, 2025, the third anniversary date of Dawn FM, a concert film featuring 13 of the performed songs—including "Timeless" and "São Paulo" from Hurry Up Tomorrow—was released exclusively on Spotify as part of its video podcast Billions Club: The Series.

On January 24, an ABC press release revealed that the Weeknd will perform on American late-night talk show Jimmy Kimmel Live! on January 30, one day before the album's release. Neither the Weeknd nor the talk show confirmed the performance in the lead-up to the broadcast. In a pre-recorded performance, the Weeknd performed "Open Hearts", and as the performance concluded, a lone stop-motion figure—the only attendee in the stands—led him through a door into a sinister, stop-motion world reminiscent of the visuals shared in July 2024. There, the Weeknd himself transformed into a stop-motion figure and appeared to drown in a mysterious liquid, leading up to the events from the "Red Terror" music video. On February 2, 2025, the Weeknd appeared at the 67th Annual Grammys Awards to perform "Cry for Me", and "Timeless" with Playboi Carti. It was a surprise performance, with Recording Academy CEO Harvey Mason Jr. inviting him to the stage, marking a moment of reconciliation between the organization and the Weeknd, following the earlier controversy in 2020 that led to the artist boycotting the Grammys. Mason Jr. declared in his introductory speech that the academy had revised its nominating committee in response to the controversy.

=== Singles ===
The Weeknd announced the release of his album's original lead single, "Dancing in the Flames", on September 9, 2024, two days after being debuted live at his concert in São Paulo. The announcement followed Apple's live event, where the iPhone 16 Pro was unveiled alongside a teaser of the music video, which was shot entirely on the device. The song, accompanied by its music and lyric videos, was officially released four days later. On September 15, a live audio version of the song was released, taken from the São Paulo performance. Two days later, an acoustic version was released along with a video, in which the Weeknd performed in the same robe as for the São Paulo concert. The initial song debuted and peaked at number 14 on the US Billboard Hot 100. The song was later removed from the album track list and all promotion tying it to its intended parent album were taken down.

Four days after performing live at the iHeartRadio Music Festival, on September 25, the album's intended second single "Timeless" with American rapper Playboi Carti was announced. The song had already debuted live at the São Paulo concert earlier that month. It was released on September 27, alongside an accompanying lyric video. The music video was released three days later. The song debuted and peaked at number 3 on the US Billboard Hot 100, marking the Weeknd's highest career debut on the chart. "Timeless" set a new career-high debut on Spotify, garnering 10.04 million streams in its first 24 hours. The song was later reworked as lead single, due to "Dancing in the Flames" being scrapped from the album. A remix of "Timeless" featuring American rapper Doechii was released on May 9, 2025.

On October 25, 2024, Brazilian singer Anitta shared a post depicting herself with a baby belly and a white face mask. One day after, a snippet of the song was again featured in a trailer to Call Of Duty: Black Ops 6. The day after that, Anitta shared a post depicting an ultrasound image of a baby with sharp teeth and a forked tail asking if the creature is beautiful, to which the Weeknd responded how beautiful it looks. The picture was labelled with the coordinates of São Paulo, Brazil, along with a date later revealed as the release date of the intended third single "São Paulo", featuring Anitta. Released intentionally a day prior to Halloween on October 30, the single's music video premiered simultaneously. The song debuted and peaked at number 77 on the US Billboard Hot 100.

"Cry for Me" was released as the album's third single on February 4, 2025. The same day, single versions of "Open Hearts", "Enjoy the Show" and "Wake Me Up" were released, for which the transitions to neighboring songs on the album's tracklist are removed.

=== Other songs ===
The Weeknd debuted "Open Hearts" during the After Hours til Dawn Tour shows at Sydney's Accor Stadium on October 22 and 23. The song was released on November 14, as part of an immersive music experience in collaboration with Apple, exclusively on the Apple Vision Pro. The experience was the first of its kind developed around the headset. Parts of its music video appeared in an album teaser released on January 23, 2025, while the song was not made available on traditional streaming platforms prior to the release of its parent album. Its music video was uploaded to YouTube on February 2, 2025. It has also been noted by fans and critics that the album's closing song, the title track, blends into "High for This", the first song on House of Balloons, cycling Tesfaye's career as the Weeknd.

=== Tour ===
Starting on July 14, 2022, the Weeknd embarked on the After Hours til Dawn Tour in support of After Hours and Dawn FM, his seventh concert tour and first all-stadium tour. Before the release of Hurry Up Tomorrow, the tour encompassed four legs, totalling 68 shows, successively visiting North America (2022), Europe and Latin America (2023), and Australia (2024).

On September 23, 2024, the Weeknd tweeted "Note for XO: After Hours Til Dawn is the tour name of the entire trilogy", confirming that the tour would also support Hurry Up Tomorrow. At Spotify's Billions Club concert on December 17, he announced that the tour would resume in 2025. He teased new tour dates on January 28, 2025, by tweeting "After Hours til Dawn, the opera continues". On January 31, a new leg of the tour was announced, featuring 26 stadium shows (later increased to 42 due to high demand) across North America from May to September 2025, alongside Playboi Carti and special guest Mike Dean.

On September 4, 2025, the tour was further extended with two new legs for 2026: a return to Latin America with five shows and to Europe with thirteen shows (later increased to 6 and 37, respectively, due to high demand).

=== Film ===
On November 4, 2024, American film studio Lionsgate announced it had acquired worldwide distribution rights to Hurry Up Tomorrow, a psychological thriller film based on the album. It is directed by Trey Edward Shults, who wrote the screenplay with Tesfaye and Reza Fahim. Shults also produced the film with Kevin Turen and Harrison Kreiss. Making his feature film debut, Tesfaye stars alongside Jenna Ortega, Barry Keoghan, and Gabby Barrett. Live Nation Entertainment financed the film on a budget of over $15 million. During Spotify's Billions Club concert on December 17, Tesfaye announced the film would be released in 2025. Three days later, the release date of May 16, 2025, was announced. The film received negative reviews from critics.

=== Other promotion ===
On January 28, it was announced that a New York City pop-up shop, created in partnership with Spotify, will open for the first three days following the album's release.

On February 1, a stop motion music video for "Red Terror" was released. The video appears to be a continuation of his live performance at Jimmy Kimmel Live!, which aired two days before. On February 2, a music video for "Open Hearts" was released. It represents the same video as previously released to Apple Vision Pro exclusively.

A cover story with Complex was published on February 20, 2025, along with a short claymation film, which appears to be the continuation of the music video for "Red Terror".

On April 18, the music video for "Drive" was released on YouTube. It stars Jenna Ortega and was directed by Trey Edward Shults, the Weeknd's collaborators for the upcoming feature film based on the album. The music video begins with Tesfaye immersed in a bathtub filled with water as he envisions flashes of a car driving down a road and Ortega sitting in front of a fire in the middle of the woods to the outro of "Given Up on Me". As the music transitions into "Drive", it shows snippets of Tesfaye and Ortega standing over a bridge, sitting on a Ferris wheel and Ortega driving down a canyon alone. After the song closes, it transitions into the first verse of "Baptized In Fear" as the video returns to Tesfaye in the overflowing bathtub.

== Critical reception ==
Professional ratings
Aggregate scores
Source	Rating
AnyDecentMusic?	6.6/10
Metacritic	75/100
Review scores
Source	Rating
AllMusic	3/5 stars
Consequence of Sound	B−
Exclaim!	6/10
The Guardian	3/5 stars
The Independent	5/5 stars
The Irish Times	2/5 stars
NME	4/5 stars
Pitchfork	7.8/10
Rolling Stone	3.5/5 stars
Slant Magazine	3/5 stars

According to the review aggregator Metacritic, Hurry Up Tomorrow received "generally favorable reviews" based on a weighted average score of 75 out of 100 from 11 critic scores.

VICE described the album as an "apt will and testament" for the Weeknd's whole project, calling it "the kind of 5D novel-in-song that only Kanye West used to be capable of making". The Independent praised Hurry Up Tomorrow as the Weeknd's most ambitious project yet, likening it to a feature-length film with seamless transitions and a rich blend of electronic and R&B influences, awarding the work a perfect score. The review highlighted the album's cinematic scope, personal lyricism, and bold artistic risks, calling it a fitting conclusion to the trilogy that began with After Hours. In a positive review, Clash praised Hurry Up Tomorrow as "a structurally intricate and sonically expansive conclusion" to the Weeknd's trilogy, blending elements from his entire discography into a cohesive and emotionally resonant experience. The review highlighted the album's ambitious scope, genre-spanning production, and reflective closing moment, calling it a "sonic supernova" and awarding it a 9/10 rating. NME described Hurry Up Tomorrow as a fitting potential swansong for the Weeknd, marking the final chapter of a loose trilogy exploring fame, pain, and transformation. The review praised the album's mix of moody synth-pop and bold experimentation while highlighting its introspective lyrics, star-studded collaborations, and cinematic scope.

The Guardian's review of Hurry Up Tomorrow was more mixed, describing the album as both "captivating" and "exhausting", with the Weeknd's great musical production often undermined by shallow, self-pitying lyrics about fame. Despite its impressive sound, the review suggests that the album's lack of depth and its overtly theatrical tone may signal the end of the Weeknd's persona.

== Awards and nominations ==
Awards and nominations for Hurry Up Tomorrow
Organization	Year	Category	Result	Ref.
American Music Awards	2025	Favorite R&B Album	Won	
BET Awards	2025	Album of the Year	Nominated	
MTV Video Music Awards	2025	Best Album	Nominated	
Juno Awards	2026	Album of the Year	Nominated	

== Commercial performance ==
=== Streaming ===
Upon the album's release, Hurry Up Tomorrow accumulated 58 million streams globally within its first day of availability on Spotify, and 302 million streams within its first week, becoming his largest streaming debut for all his studio projects on the platform. Furthermore, Hurry Up Tomorrow marks the largest streaming debut on the platform of any major album release in 2025 so far.

=== United States ===
In the United States, Hurry Up Tomorrow debuted at number one on the Billboard 200, with first week sales of 490,500 album-equivalent units, consisting of 171.5 million on-demand streams and 359,000 pure album sales, the latter figure being the highest for any male artist since 2020. With this feat, Hurry Up Tomorrow marked The Weeknd's fifth Billboard 200 chart-topping album and his highest opening week sales by overall units in the country. The album also marked the third largest week opener of 2025 (after Morgan Wallen's I'm the Problem), and the largest for any album since Taylor Swift's The Tortured Poets Department (2024).

=== International ===
In other markets, the album topped the charts in 16 other countries, including its domestic market Canada, as well as France, becoming his first album to achieve this, but also Norway, Belgium, Australia, United Kingdom and New Zealand, and top five in Sweden, Finland, Italy, Spain and Switzerland.

== Track listing ==
Hurry Up Tomorrow track listing
No.	Title	Writer(s)	Producer(s)	Length
1.	"Wake Me Up" (with Justice)	Abel Tesfaye; Gaspard Augé; Xavier de Rosnay; Mike Dean; John Padgett; Rodney Temperton; Ahmad Balshe; Vincent Taurelle	The Weeknd; Justice; Mike Dean; Johnny Jewel; Sage Skolfield^{[v]}	5:08
2.	"Cry for Me"	Tesfaye; Dean; Leland Wayne; Balshe; Karen Patterson; Curtis Williams	The Weeknd; Dean; Metro Boomin; Skolfield^{[v]}	3:44
3.	"I Can't Fucking Sing"	Tesfaye; Daniel Lopatin; Nathan Salon	The Weeknd; OPN; Salon	0:12
4.	"São Paulo" (with Anitta)	Tesfaye; Larissa de Macedo; Tatiana Lourenço; Dean; Sean Solymar; Washington Vaz; Agustinho dos Santos; André Viegas; Everton de Araujo; Flavio de Almeida; Marcelo Nei Leal	The Weeknd; Dean; Solymar^{[c]}	5:02
5.	"Until We're Skin & Bones"	Tesfaye; Lopatin; Salon	The Weeknd; OPN; Dean; Salon	0:22
6.	"Baptized in Fear"	Tesfaye; Lopatin; Salon	The Weeknd; OPN; Salon; Dean; Skolfield^{[v]}	3:52
7.	"Open Hearts"	Tesfaye; Karl Sandberg; Oscar Holter	Max Martin; Holter	3:54
8.	"Opening Night"	Tesfaye; Dean; Lopatin; Patrick Baker	The Weeknd; Dean; OPN; Salon; Skolfield^{[v]}	1:36
9.	"Reflections Laughing" (with Travis Scott and Florence and the Machine)	Tesfaye; Jacques Webster II; Dean	The Weeknd; Travis Scott; Dean; Metro Boomin^{[c]}; OPN^{[a]}; Salon^{[a]}; Skolfield^{[v]}	4:51
10.	"Enjoy the Show" (with Future)	Tesfaye; Nayvadius Wilburn; Dean; Josh Lloyd-Watson; Lydia Kitto	The Weeknd; Dean; Che' Fuego 3000; Just Da 1^{[c]}; Tommy Rush^{[a]}^{[v]}; Skolfield^{[v]}	5:01
11.	"Given Up on Me"	Tesfaye; Wilburn; Dean; Wayne; Lopatin; Dimitri Tiomkin; Ned Washington; James McCants	The Weeknd; Dean; Metro Boomin; OPN; Salon^{[c]}; Skolfield^{[v]}	5:55
12.	"I Can't Wait to Get There"	Tesfaye; Steven Franks; Dean; Thomas Brown; Thomas Lumpkins; Peter Lee Johnson	The Weeknd; Dean; Tommy Brown; Tommy Parker; Johnson; Skolfield^{[v]}	3:09
13.	"Timeless" (with Playboi Carti)	Tesfaye; Jordan Carter; Pharrell Williams; Mark Williams; Raul Cubina; Dean; Jarrod Morgan; Kobe Hood; Tariq Sharrieff; Devon Chisolm	P. Williams; Ojivolta; Dean; Twisco; BbyKobe^{[u]}; Blssd^{[u]}	4:16
14.	"Niagara Falls"	Tesfaye; Dean; Kenneth Edmonds	The Weeknd; Dean; Skolfield^{[v]}	4:37
15.	"Take Me Back to LA"	Tesfaye; Dean; Jason Quenneville	The Weeknd; Dean; DaHeala; Solymar^{[c]}; Rush^{[c]}; Skolfield^{[c]}^{[v]}	4:14
16.	"Big Sleep" (with Giorgio Moroder)	Tesfaye; Giovanni Moroder; Dean; Lopatin; Mejdi Rhars; Salon; Henry Walter	The Weeknd; Moroder; Dean; OPN; Prince 85; Salon^{[c]}; Cirkut^{[c]}; Steve Shepherd^{[a]}; Allesando Albertini^{[a]}; Skolfield^{[v]}	3:45
17.	"Give Me Mercy"	Tesfaye; Sandberg; Holter; Lopatin	The Weeknd; Martin; Holter; OPN^{[a]}; Ilya^{[a]}	3:36
18.	"Drive"	Tesfaye; Lopatin; Matt Cohn	The Weeknd; OPN; Cohn; Martin^{[c]}^{[v]}; Holter^{[c]}^{[v]}; Salon^{[a]}	3:08
19.	"The Abyss" (with Lana Del Rey)	Tesfaye; Elizabeth Grant; Dean; Patrick Greenaway	The Weeknd; Dean; Greenaway^{[c]}; OPN^{[a]}; Skolfield^{[v]}	4:42
20.	"Red Terror"	Tesfaye; Lopatin	The Weeknd; OPN; Dean; Cirkut; Salon^{[a]}; Skolfield^{[v]}	3:51
21.	"Without a Warning"	Tesfaye; Thabo Publicover; Tewodros Fantu; Lopatin; Holter; Darryl Howard; Isaac Brown; Moroder	The Weeknd; Thabo; Teddy Fantum; OPN^{[c]}; Holter^{[c]}; Dean^{[c]}; Skolfield^{[v]}	4:57
22.	"Hurry Up Tomorrow"	Tesfaye	Dean; OPN; DaHeala; Salon^{[c]}; Skolfield^{[v]}	4:51
Total length:				84:39

Pharrell Williams and Japanese bonus track
No.	Title	Writer(s)	Producer(s)	Length
23.	"Closing Night" (with Swedish House Mafia)	Tesfaye; Axel Hedfors; Steve Angello; Sebastian Ingrosso	The Weeknd; Swedish House Mafia	3:47
Total length:				88:26

00XO and First Pressing bonus tracks
No.	Title	Writer(s)	Producer(s)	Length
23.	"Runaway"	Tesfaye; Sandberg; Holter; Ilya Salmanzadeh	The Weeknd; Martin; Holter; Ilya	3:21
24.	"Society"	Tesfaye; Sandberg; Holter	The Weeknd; Martin; Holter	2:47
Total length:				90:47

=== Notes ===
- ^{^[a]} signifies an additional producer.
- ^{^[c]} signifies a co-producer.
- ^{^[u]} signifies an uncredited producer.
- ^{^[v]} signifies a vocal producer.
- "Given Up on Me" features uncredited vocals by Future.
- "Without a Warning", "Society", and "Give Me Mercy" are respectively named "The Crowd", "How It Feels", and "Africa" when playing the first pressing CDs.
- "I Can't Fucking Sing" features dialogue from the Hurry Up Tomorrow film.
- First pressing of the album features eleven tracks out of 22 with a total runtime of 41 minutes and 16 seconds.
- Apple Music video album edition includes all five music videos.
- 2026 Japanese reissue includes "Dancing in the Flames" in place of "Give Me Mercy" as track 17.

=== Sample credits ===
- "Wake Me Up" contains an interpolation of "Thriller", written by Rodney Temperton, as performed by Michael Jackson.
- "Cry for Me" contains a sample of "I Wanna Be the One", written by Curtis Fitzgerald Williams and Karen Patterson, as performed by The S.O.S. Band.
- "São Paulo" contains an interpolation of "Montagem Pidona", written by Flavio Seraphim de Almeida, Everton Ramos de Araujo, Marcelo Nei Leal, Tatiana dos Santos Lourenço, Agustinho Raphael dos Santos, Washington Luis Costa Vaz, and Andre Luiz Viegasand, as performed by Tati Quebra Barraco.
- "Opening Night" contains a sample of "Computer Love" written by Patrick Baker, as performed by Techmaster P.E.B.
- "Enjoy the Show" contains a sample of "Homemade Gun", written by Lydia Kitto and Josh Lloyd-Watson, as performed by Loaded Honey.
- "Given Up on Me" contains a sample of "Wild Is the Wind", written by Dimitri Tiomkin and Ned Washington, as performed by Nina Simone, and a sample of "On the Way" written by James Louis MC Cants, as performed by Chicago Gangsters.
- "Niagara Falls" contains a sample of "Someone to Love", written by Kenneth Edmonds, as performed by Jon B. featuring Babyface.
- "Without a Warning" contains a sample of "Hurry Up Tomorrow", written by Darryl Howard and Isaac Brown, as performed by The Nu'rons.

== Personnel ==
=== Musicians ===
- The Weeknd – vocals (all tracks except track 5), programming (tracks 7, 17, 18); bass, drums, keyboards (7, 17)
- Mike Dean – synthesizer (tracks 1, 2, 4, 6, 8, 10, 11, 13, 15, 16, 19, 21, 22), guitar (1), drum programming (4), programming (20), keyboards (22)
- Nathan Salon – programming (tracks 1, 3, 5, 6, 22), synthesizer (5, 6, 11, 16, 22), drums (6, 16)
- OPN – synthesizer (tracks 2, 5, 6, 8, 9, 11, 16–22), drums (11, 18, 20)
- Sean Solymar – drum programming (tracks 4, 15)
- Anitta – vocals (track 4)
- Max Martin – programming (tracks 7, 17, 18); bass, drums, keyboards (7, 17); piano (18)
- Oscar Holter – programming (tracks 7, 17, 18, 21); bass, drums, keyboards (7, 17); synthesizer (21)
- Davide Rossi – strings (track 7)
- Chxrry22 – spoken word (track 9)
- Jon B. – additional vocals (track 14)
- Tommy Rush – acoustic guitar (tracks 15, 22), drum programming (15)
- Sage Skolfield – drum programming (track 15)
- Encompass Music Partners – choir (tracks 16, 20, 21)
- Joshua Eustis – choir arrangement (tracks 16, 20, 21), conductor (20)
- Megan Mitchell – choir member (tracks 16, 20, 21)
- Ilya – programming (track 17)
- David Bukovinszky – cello (track 18)
- Mattias Bylund – string arrangement, string synthesizer (track 18)
- Karl Guner – string synthesizer (track 18)
- Erik Arvinder – violin (track 18)
- Mattias Johansson – violin (track 18)
- Lana Del Rey – vocals (track 19)
- Jasper Randall – chorus director (tracks 20, 21)

=== Technical ===
- Mike Dean – mastering (all tracks), mixing (tracks 1–6, 8–16, 18–22), engineering (10, 20), vocal engineering (4)
- Sage Skolfield – mixing (tracks 1–3, 6, 10–12, 15), engineering (1–3, 6, 8, 10–16, 19–22), vocal engineering (1, 2, 4, 6, 8–12, 14–16, 21, 22), co-mixing (13, 16, 19, 20)
- Tommy Rush – mixing (tracks 1–3, 5, 6, 8–11, 13, 18), engineering (1–3, 6, 8, 10–12, 14–16, 19–22), second engineering (1–3, 5, 6, 8–11, 13, 16, 18), vocal engineering (10), additional mixing (12, 14, 19–22)
- Nathan Salon – mixing (tracks 3, 5, 22), engineering (1–3, 5, 6, 8, 11, 16, 17, 19–21)
- Serban Ghenea – mixing (tracks 7, 17, 21)
- Bryce Bordone – mixing (tracks 7, 17), second engineering (7, 17), additional mixing (21)
- Pharrell Williams – mixing (track 13)
- Sean Solymar – mixing (track 15), engineering (1, 15)
- Marcus Fritz – vocal mixing (track 13)
- Shin Kamiyama – engineering (tracks 1, 2, 6, 8, 12, 14, 18–20, 22)
- Sam Holland – engineering (tracks 7, 17, 18)
- Ethan Stevens – engineering (track 9)
- Mike Larson – engineering (track 13)
- Faris Al-Majed – recording, second engineering (tracks 1, 2, 4)
- Eric Manco – vocal engineering (track 10)
- Max Martin – vocal engineering (track 18)
- Oscar Holter – vocal engineering (track 18)
- Mattias Bylund – string engineering (track 18)
- Henrik Langemyr – string engineering (track 18)
- Karl Guner – string engineering (track 18)

== Charts ==
=== Weekly charts ===
Weekly chart performance
Chart (2025)	Peak position
Australian Albums (ARIA)	1
Austrian Albums (Ö3 Austria)	2
Belgian Albums (Ultratop Flanders)	1
Belgian Albums (Ultratop Wallonia)	1
Canadian Albums (Billboard)	1
Croatian International Albums (HDU)	5
Czech Albums (ČNS IFPI)	3
Danish Albums (Hitlisten)	1
Dutch Albums (Album Top 100)	1
Finnish Albums (Suomen virallinen lista)	5
French Albums (SNEP)	1
German Albums (Offizielle Top 100)	1
Greek Albums (IFPI)	3
Hungarian Albums (MAHASZ)	1
Icelandic Albums (Tónlistinn)	2
Irish Albums (Official Charts)	1
Italian Albums (FIMI)	2
Japanese Dance & Soul Albums (Oricon)	2
Japanese Digital Albums (Oricon)	22
Japanese International Albums (Oricon)	19
Japanese Hot Albums (Billboard Japan)	60
Lithuanian Albums (AGATA)	3
New Zealand Albums (RMNZ)	1
Nigerian Albums (TurnTable)	50
Norwegian Albums (VG-lista)	1
Polish Albums (ZPAV)	1
Portuguese Albums (AFP)	1
Scottish Albums (Official Charts)	1
Slovak Albums (ČNS IFPI)	1
Spanish Albums (Promusicae)	4
Swedish Albums (Sverigetopplistan)	3
Swiss Albums (Schweizer Hitparade)	2
UK Albums (Official Charts)	1
UK R&B Albums (Official Charts)	1
US Billboard 200	1
US Top R&B/Hip-Hop Albums (Billboard)	1

=== Monthly charts ===
Monthly chart performance
Chart (2025)	Position
Japanese Dance & Soul Albums (Oricon)	7

=== Year-end charts ===
Year-end chart performance
Chart (2025)	Position
Australian Albums (ARIA)	22
Austrian Albums (Ö3 Austria)	46
Belgian Albums (Ultratop Flanders)	47
Belgian Albums (Ultratop Wallonia)	25
Canadian Albums (Billboard)	19
Danish Albums (Hitlisten)	39
Dutch Albums (Album Top 100)	22
French Albums (SNEP)	19
German Albums (Offizielle Top 100)	13
Global Albums (IFPI)	14
Hungarian Albums (MAHASZ)	21
Icelandic Albums (Tónlistinn)	66
Italian Albums (FIMI)	43
New Zealand Albums (RMNZ)	35
Polish Albums (ZPAV)	59
Swedish Albums (Sverigetopplistan)	60
Swiss Albums (Schweizer Hitparade)	15
UK Albums (OCC)	58
US Billboard 200	17
US Top R&B/Hip-Hop Albums (Billboard)	5

== Certifications ==
Certifications
Region	Certification	Certified units/sales
Belgium (BRMA)	Gold	10,000^{‡}
Brazil (Pro-Música Brasil)	Gold	20,000^{‡}
Canada (Music Canada)	2× Platinum	160,000^{‡}
Denmark (IFPI Danmark)	Platinum	20,000^{‡}
France (SNEP)	Platinum	100,000^{‡}
Germany (BVMI)	Gold	75,000^{‡}
Italy (FIMI)	Platinum	50,000^{‡}
New Zealand (RMNZ)	Gold	7,500^{‡}
Poland (ZPAV)	Platinum	30,000^{‡}
Portugal (AFP)	Gold	3,500^{‡}
United Kingdom (BPI)	Gold	100,000^{‡}
^{‡} Sales+streaming figures based on certification alone.

== Release history ==
Release history
Region	Date	Label(s)	Format(s)	Edition	Ref.
Various	January 31, 2025	XO; Republic	Digital download; streaming	Complete	
Various	January 31, 2025	XO; Republic	Digital download	00XO	
Various	January 31, 2025	XO; Republic	Cassette; CD; Vinyl	First pressing	
Various	February 5, 2025	XO; Republic	Digital download	Pharrell Williams	
Various	February 11, 2025	XO; Republic	Streaming	Video	
Various	May 9, 2025	XO; Republic	CD; Vinyl	Complete	
Japan	May 23, 2025	Universal Music Japan	CD	Japanese	
