= Wake Me Up (The Weeknd and Justice song) =

2025 song by the Weeknd and Justice

Song by the Weeknd and Justice

from the album Hurry Up Tomorrow
- Released: January 31, 2025
- Studio: Light Sonic Division (Woodland Hills)
- Genre: Synth-pop
- Length: 5:08 (album version); 3:30 (single/radio edit)
- Label: XO; Republic
- Songwriters: Abel Tesfaye; Gaspard Augé; Xavier de Rosnay; Michael Dean; John Padgett; Rod Temperton; Ahmad Balshe; Vincent Taurelle
- Producers: The Weeknd; Justice; Mike Dean; Johnny Jewel

"Wake Me Up" is a song by Canadian singer-songwriter the Weeknd and French musical duo Justice. It was released through XO and Republic Records as the opening track from the former's sixth studio album, Hurry Up Tomorrow, on January 31, 2025. The song was produced by the Weeknd and Justice with Mike Dean and Johnny Jewel; they wrote the song along with Belly and Vincent Taurelle, with Rod Temperton also receiving a posthumous songwriting credit due to the song's interpolation of Michael Jackson's hit single, "Thriller" (1982). The song was included on the Weeknd's film of the same name, released on May 16, 2025. "Wake Me Up" received widespread acclaim from critics.

== Composition and lyrics ==
Roisin O'Connor of The Independent saw the song as "a scene-setting moment for what, it soon emerges, is the Canadian artist's most ambitious project to date – a feature film-length album that supposedly serves as the final chapter for his enigmatic alter ego The Weeknd". The song starts off slow and then gets upbeat, in which the fast-paced instrumental is reminiscent of the music from Michael Jackson's fifth studio album, Off the Wall (1979) and the song "Tell Me I'm Not Dreamin' (Too Good to Be True)" by Jermaine Jackson.

== Critical reception ==
The song was met with widespread critical acclaim. Writing for Clash, Robin Murray described "Wake Me Up" as "a stellar opener" from Hurry Up Tomorrow. In contrast, Neil McCormick, Andrew Perry, and Poppie Platt described the song as a "doomy opening". Carl Lamarre of Billboard ranked "Wake Me Up" as the twelfth best song on the album as he acknowledged the Weeknd's love for Michael Jackson's music and the "Thriller" sample, describing the song as "a five-minute exhibition of [the] Weeknd's exploration of legacy, reality, and disillusionment" and "[The] Weeknd's deftly executes on the pop-synth intro with sizzling precision".

== Credits and personnel ==
Credits adapted from Tidal.

- The Weeknd – vocals, keyboard, programming, songwriting, production
- Mike Dean – guitar, synthesizer, songwriting, production, mixing, mastering
- Gaspard Michel Andre Augé – songwriting, production
- Xavier de Rosnay – songwriting, production
- Johnny Jewel – songwriting, production
- Sage Skofield – engineering, vocal engineering, vocal production, mixing
- Tommy Rush – engineering, second engineering, mixing
- Nathan Salon – programming, engineering
- Sean Solymar – engineering
- Shin Kamiyama – engineering
- Faris Al-Majed – recording, second engineering
- Ahmad Balshe – songwriting
- Vincent Taurelle – songwriting, drums
- Rod Temperton – songwriting

== Charts ==
Chart performance for "Wake Me Up"
Chart (2025)	Peak position
Australia (ARIA)	61
Canada Hot 100 (Billboard)	28
Global 200 (Billboard)	31
France (SNEP)	28
Greece International (IFPI)	9
Iceland (Tónlistinn)	15
India International (IMI)	13
Italy (FIMI)	57
Latvia (LaIPA)	18
Lithuania (AGATA)	25
New Zealand Hot Singles (RMNZ)	4
Poland (Polish Streaming Top 100)	89
South Africa (TOSAC)	59
Sweden (Sverigetopplistan)	52
UK Singles Sales (OCC)	74
UK Streaming (OCC)	54
US Billboard Hot 100	45
US Hot Dance/Pop Songs (Billboard)	3

== Certifications ==
Certifications for "Wake Me Up"
Region	Certification	Certified units/sales
Brazil (Pro-Música Brasil)	Gold	20,000^{‡}
Canada (Music Canada)	Platinum	80,000^{‡}
^{‡} Sales+streaming figures based on certification alone.
