= Open Hearts (song) =

2024 song by the Weeknd

- Apple Music Immersive cover

Song by the Weeknd

from the album Hurry Up Tomorrow
- Released: November 14, 2024 (Apple limited release); January 31, 2025 (album track)
- Studio: Conway (Los Angeles); MXM (Stockholm); House Mouse (Stockholm)
- Genre: Electropop; synthwave
- Length: 3:54 (album version); 3:31 (single/radio edit)
- Label: XO; Republic
- Songwriters: Abel Tesfaye; Max Martin; Oscar Holter
- Producers: Martin; Holter

Music video
- "Open Hearts" on YouTube

"Open Hearts" is a song by Canadian singer-songwriter the Weeknd. It was released through XO and Republic Records as the seventh track from his sixth studio album, Hurry Up Tomorrow, on January 31, 2025. The song was written and produced alongside Max Martin and Oscar Holter. It had a limited release through the Apple Music Immersive experience titled The Weeknd: Open Hearts, which was available exclusively on the Apple TV app on the Apple Vision Pro as the first ever music video experience designed exclusively around the product, on November 14, 2024. The song transitioned out of the album's previous track "Baptized in Fear".

== Music video ==
The music video was shot entirely with a 180-degree media format, and is directed by Anton Tammi, who previously directed the music video for its then-lead single "Dancing in the Flames". It is the first ever exclusive music video released for the Apple Vision Pro and was released on November 14, 2024. The music video features the Weeknd confronting his inner demons in a visually dark and sinister setting, starting with a scene where he's strapped to a gurney in an ambulance. The narrative intensifies as the ambulance crew, depicted with glowing orange eyes, hint at an eerie, otherworldly presence, accompanying a journey that shifts from a desert highway to the streets of Los Angeles. The video culminates with Tesfaye facing a cult-like leader in a room of creatures with glowing eyes, revealing the leader to be a darker version of himself, enhancing the song's themes of struggle and self-confrontation.

The video was then released on YouTube on February 2, 2025.

== Credits and personnel ==
Credits adapted from Tidal.

- The Weeknd – vocals, keyboard, bass, drums, programming, songwriting
- Max Martin – keyboard, bass, drums, programming, songwriting, production
- Oscar Holter – keyboard, bass, drums, programming, songwriting, production
- Davide Rossi – strings
- Sam Holland - engineering
- Bryce Bordone - second engineering, mixing
- Serban Ghenea - mixing
- Mike Dean – mastering

== Charts ==
=== Weekly charts ===
Weekly chart performance for "Open Hearts"
Chart (2025)	Peak position
Australia (ARIA)	64
Canada Hot 100 (Billboard)	27
Czech Republic Singles Digital (ČNS IFPI)	91
France (SNEP)	34
Global 200 (Billboard)	30
Greece International (IFPI)	6
Iceland (Tónlistinn)	18
India International (IMI)	8
Italy (FIMI)	55
Latvia Streaming (LaIPA)	13
Lithuania (AGATA)	22
North Macedonia Airplay (Radiomonitor)	10
Poland (Polish Streaming Top 100)	61
Portugal (AFP)	43
Serbia Airplay (Radiomonitor)	9
Slovakia Singles Digital (ČNS IFPI)	33
South Africa (TOSAC)	77
Sweden (Sverigetopplistan)	56
UK Singles Sales (OCC)	60
UK Streaming (OCC)	58
US Billboard Hot 100	48
US Hot Dance/Pop Songs (Billboard)	4

=== Year-end charts ===
Year-end chart performance for "Open Hearts"
Chart (2025)	Position
US Hot Dance/Pop Songs (Billboard)	25

== Certifications ==
Certifications for "Open Hearts"
Region	Certification	Certified units/sales
Brazil (Pro-Música Brasil)	Gold	20,000^{‡}
Canada (Music Canada)	Gold	40,000^{‡}
France (SNEP)	Gold	100,000^{‡}
^{‡} Sales+streaming figures based on certification alone.

== Release history ==
Release history and formats for "Open Hearts"
Region	Date	Format	Label	Ref.
Various	November 14, 2024	Limited streaming release	XO; Republic	
