= São Paulo (song) =

2024 single by the Weeknd and Anitta

Single by the Weeknd and Anitta

from the album Hurry Up Tomorrow
- Language: Portuguese; English
- Released: October 30, 2024
- Studio: Light Sonic Division (Woodland Hills)
- Genre: Brazilian funk
- Length: 5:02 (original); 3:30 (music video edit); 2:29 ("single"/radio edit)
- Label: XO; Republic
- Composers: Michael Dean; Sean Solymar; Washington Vaz; Agustinho dos Santos; André Viegas; Everton de Araujo; Flavio de Almeida; Marcelo Nei Leal
- Lyricists: Abel Tesfaye; Larissa Macedo; Tatiana Lourenço
- Producers: The Weeknd; Mike Dean; Sean Solymar (co.)

The Weeknd singles chronology
"Timeless" (2024)	"São Paulo" (2024)	"Cry for Me" (2025)

Anitta singles chronology
"Malvado Favorito" (2024)	"São Paulo" (2024)	"Romeo" (2025)

Music video
- "São Paulo" on YouTube

"São Paulo" is a song by Canadian singer the Weeknd and Brazilian singer Anitta. It was released on October 30, 2024, through XO and Republic Records as the second single from the former's sixth studio album, Hurry Up Tomorrow (2025). The Weeknd produced the song along with Mike Dean, and Sean Solymar co-produced it.

== Background and promotion ==
To promote his upcoming album and celebrate his final project under the moniker the Weeknd, Tesfaye held a one-off concert in São Paulo called "one-night-only" on September 7, 2024. The occasion also marked the first time the Weeknd and Anitta performed their collaboration "São Paulo". The appearance was a surprise performance as Anitta emerged on stage initially disguised as one of the Weeknd's dancers.

On October 27, Anitta shared a post depicting an ultrasound image of a baby with sharp teeth and a forked tail asking if the creature is beautiful, to which the Weeknd responded how beautiful it looks. The picture was labelled with the date October 30, 2024, which turned out to be the release date. Anitta had previously posted a picture of herself with a baby belly and a white face mask two days prior. The song was initially released as the third single from the Weeknd's upcoming album Hurry Up Tomorrow. However, the album's intended first single "Dancing in the Flames" was later removed from the track listing and "São Paulo" was reworked as the project's second single. An EP for the song was released on September 19, 2025, where the shortened version of the song would be sent to radio stations to use.

== Music video ==
The music video for "São Paulo" coincided with the release of the song on October 30, 2024. Directed by Freeka Tet, the music video features a pregnant Anitta wearing a "Rejuvenique" massage mask with a mouth on her stomach, singing the Weeknd's lines. Sonja Knežević of Vogue Adria considered the video's horror motives appropriate for the Halloween atmosphere.

== Commercial performance ==
"São Paulo" debuted at number 35 on the Canadian Hot 100; it peaked at number 22. In the United States, the song debuted at number 77 on the Billboard Hot 100. Following the releasing of its parent album, it peaked at number 43, becoming Anitta's highest-charting single. In Brazil, the song debuted at number 69 on the Brasil Hot 100. In its second week, the song rose to a new peak of number five.

In France, the song debuted at number 55 and reached the top twenty, at number 18 by the week of February 2, 2025, following the release of "Hurry Up Tomorrow" two earlier days, becoming Anitta's highest-charting in the country since "Envolver" and the Weeknd's fourteenth top twenty.

The song also topped the Portuguese and Greek charts and reached the top ten in India, Luxembourg, Slovakia and Switzerland, top twenty in Germany, Ireland and Iceland, top thirty in Croatia, Italy, Czech Republic, Hungary and United Kingdom, top forty in the Netherlands, Norway and Australia and top fifty in Finland and Sweden.

== Track listing ==
Streaming / digital download – EP

1. "São Paulo" (single version) – 2:28
2. "São Paulo" – 5:01
3. "São Paulo" (live from São Paulo) – 5:27
4. "São Paulo" (single version / a cappella) – 2:28
5. "São Paulo" video – 3:29
6. "São Paulo" video (live from São Paulo / 2024) – 5:04

== Credits and personnel ==
Credits adapted from Tidal.

- The Weeknd – vocals, songwriting, co-production, keyboards, programming
- Anitta – vocals, songwriting
- Mike Dean – songwriting, co-production, synths, drum programming, vocal engineering, mixing, mastering
- Tommy Rush – assistant mixing
- Sean Solymar – songwriting, co-production, drum programming
- Sage Skolfield – vocal engineering
- Faris Al-Majed – assistant engineering
- Flavio Seraphim de Almeida – songwriting
- Everton Ramos de Araujo – songwriting
- Marcelo Nei Leal – songwriting
- Tatiana dos Santos Lourenço – songwriting
- Agustinho Raphael dos Santos – songwriting
- Washington Luis Costa Vaz – songwriting
- Andre Luiz Viegasand – songwriting

== Charts ==
=== Weekly charts ===
Weekly chart performance for "São Paulo"
Chart (2024–2026)	Peak position
Australia (ARIA)	32
Austria (Ö3 Austria Top 40)	13
Belgium (Ultratop 50 Wallonia)	40
Brazil Hot 100 (Billboard)	5
Canada Hot 100 (Billboard)	22
Croatia (Billboard)	21
Czech Republic Singles Digital (ČNS IFPI)	24
Finland (Suomen virallinen lista)	48
France (SNEP)	18
Germany (GfK)	16
Global 200 (Billboard)	15
Greece International (IFPI)	1
Hungary (Single Top 40)	25
Iceland (Tónlistinn)	11
India International (IMI)	3
Ireland (IRMA)	15
Italy (FIMI)	30
Japan Hot Overseas (Billboard Japan)	11
Latvia Airplay (TopHit)	2
Latvia Streaming (LaIPA)	3
Lithuania (AGATA)	3
Luxembourg (Billboard)	9
Malaysia (Billboard)	13
Malaysia International (RIM)	12
Netherlands (Single Top 100)	38
New Zealand Hot Singles (RMNZ)	2
Norway (VG-lista)	34
Poland (Polish Streaming Top 100)	11
Portugal (AFP)	1
Romania (Billboard)	11
Singapore (RIAS)	10
Slovakia Singles Digital (ČNS IFPI)	6
Spain (Promusicae)	78
Sweden (Sverigetopplistan)	33
Switzerland (Schweizer Hitparade)	2
Turkey International Airplay (Radiomonitor Türkiye)	2
UK Singles (Official Charts)	21
US Billboard Hot 100	43
US Hot Dance/Electronic Songs (Billboard)	2
US Hot Dance/Pop Songs (Billboard)	2
US Pop Airplay (Billboard)	28
US World Digital Song Sales (Billboard)	2
Venezuela Anglo Airplay (Monitor Latino)	10

=== Monthly charts ===
Monthly chart performance for "São Paulo"
Chart (2024)	Peak position
Brazil Streaming (Pro-Música Brasil) Live version	20
Latvia Airplay (TopHit)	12
Lithuania Airplay (TopHit)	38

=== Year-end charts ===
Year-end chart performance for "São Paulo"
Chart (2025)	Position
Hungary (Single Top 40)	93
India International (IMI)	9
Latvia Airplay (TopHit)	194
US Hot Dance/Pop Songs (Billboard)	9

== Certifications ==
Certifications for "São Paulo"
Region	Certification	Certified units/sales
Austria (IFPI Austria)	Gold	15,000^{‡}
Brazil (Pro-Música Brasil)	2× Diamond	320,000^{‡}
Canada (Music Canada)	3× Platinum	240,000^{‡}
Denmark (IFPI Danmark)	Gold	45,000^{‡}
France (SNEP)	Platinum	200,000^{‡}
Italy (FIMI)	Gold	100,000^{‡}
New Zealand (RMNZ)	Gold	15,000^{‡}
Poland (ZPAV)	Platinum	125,000^{‡}
Portugal (AFP)	Platinum	10,000^{‡}
Spain (Promusicae)	Gold	50,000^{‡}
United Kingdom (BPI)	Silver	200,000^{‡}
Streaming
Greece (IFPI Greece)	3× Platinum	6,000,000^{†}
^{‡} Sales+streaming figures based on certification alone.^{†} Streaming-only figures based on certification alone.

== Release history ==
Release history and formats for "São Paulo"
Region	Date	Format(s)	Version(s)	Label	Ref.
United States	November 5, 2024 (original release)	Contemporary hit radio	Original	XO; Republic	
United States	August 19, 2025 (re-release)	Contemporary hit radio	Original	XO; Republic	
Various	September 19, 2025	Digital download; streaming	EP	XO; Republic	
Italy	September 26, 2025	Radio airplay	Original	XO; Republic	
