= Enjoy the Show =

2025 song by the Weeknd and Future

Song by the Weeknd and Future

from the album Hurry Up Tomorrow
- Released: January 31, 2025
- Length: 5:01 (album version); 3:44 (single/radio edit)
- Label: XO; Republic
- Songwriters: Abel Tesfaye; Nayvadius Wilburn; Michael Dean; Josh Lloyd-Watson; Lydia Kitto
- Producers: The Weeknd; Mike Dean

"Enjoy the Show" is a song by Canadian singer-songwriter the Weeknd and American rapper Future. It was released through XO and Republic Records as the tenth track from The Weeknd's sixth studio album, Hurry Up Tomorrow released on January 31, 2025. The song was written and produced by The Weeknd and Mike Dean, who both wrote it with Future; it was additionally produced by Tommy Rush, Che' Fuego 3000, and Just da 1. Josh Lloyd-Watson and Lydia Kitto from British band Jungle are also credited as songwriters due to the song containing a sample of Loaded Honey's single released in 2023, "Homemade Gun".

== Composition and lyrics ==
On "Enjoy the Show", The Weeknd sings about thinking about dying. Josiah Gogarty of British GQ felt that "the beat is laid-back, with little more than a soul sample adorning it – the perfect canvas for Future to slide in with an anguished croon". Carl Lamarre of Billboard ranked "Enjoy the Show" as the fourth best song on the album, describing the song as "one of the top highlights of the first half of Hurry Up Tomorrow" and "an unbridled and unfiltered R&B showdown between The Weeknd and Future as they're drowning in their sorrow after losing their significant others" as "this toxic duo unabashedly resorts to drugs to soak in the pain since their obsessive needs can't no longer be met".

== Credits and personnel ==
Credits adapted from Tidal.

- The Weeknd – vocals, keyboard, programming, songwriting, production
- Future – vocals, songwriting
- Mike Dean – synthesizer, production, engineering, mixing, mastering
- Josh Lloyd-Watson – songwriting
- Lydia Kitto – songwriting
- Che' Fuego 3000 – production
- Just Da 1 – co-production
- Tommy Rush – engineering, second engineering, vocal engineering, vocal production, additional production, mixing
- Sage Skofield – engineering, vocal engineering, vocal production, mixing
- Eric Manco – vocal engineering

== Charts ==
Chart performance for "Enjoy the Show"
Chart (2025)	Peak position
Canada Hot 100 (Billboard)	46
France (SNEP)	74
Global 200 (Billboard)	56
Greece International (IFPI)	15
Lithuania (AGATA)	72
South Africa (TOSAC)	89
Sweden Heatseeker (Sverigetopplistan)	6
US Billboard Hot 100	60
US Hot R&B/Hip-Hop Songs (Billboard)	16
