= Reflections Laughing =

2025 song by the Weeknd, Travis Scott, and Florence and the Machine

Song by the Weeknd, Travis Scott, and Florence and the Machine

from the album Hurry Up Tomorrow
- Released: January 31, 2025
- Length: 4:51
- Label: XO; Republic
- Songwriters: Abel Tesfaye; Jacques Webster II; Michael Dean
- Producers: The Weeknd; Travis Scott; Mike Dean

"Reflections Laughing" is a song by Canadian singer-songwriter the Weeknd, American rapper and singer Travis Scott, and English indie rock band Florence and the Machine. It was released through XO and Republic Records from the Weeknd's sixth studio album, Hurry Up Tomorrow, on January 31, 2025. The song was written and produced by the Weeknd and Travis Scott themselves and Mike Dean, while it was co-produced by Metro Boomin, OPN and Nathan Salon.

== Composition and lyrics ==
In the background of the song, a telephone suddenly rings and ice shakes in a glass of whiskey as he touches on the stress and responsibility he has: "I won't make a sound / Blood on the ground / When they take my crown / If they take my crown". Josiah Gogarty of British GQ referred to the chopped and screwed effect that was used on Travis Scott's voice in his verse on the song, writing that "his appearance here reminds us he can do a scene-stealing verse as well as orchestrate big projects like Astroworld – his voice is slightly pitched-down, and he delivers his lines in a staccato, Auto-tuned flow, so they nestle among the countless other synth lines squelching and squealing all through the song". Carl Lamarre of Billboard ranked "Reflections Laughing" as the thirteenth best song on the album, adding that the Weeknd and Travis Scott "once again prove why they're a potent tag team".

== Credits and personnel ==
Credits adapted from Tidal.

- The Weeknd – vocals, keyboard, programming, songwriting, production
- Travis Scott – vocals, songwriting, production
- Florence and the Machine – vocals
- Chxrry22 – spoken word
- Mike Dean – songwriting, production, mixing, mastering
- OPN – synthesizer, additional production
- Metro Boomin – co-production
- Nathan Salon – additional production
- Tommy Rush – second engineer, mixing
- Sage Skofield – vocal engineering, vocal production
- Ethan Stevens – recording

== Charts ==
Chart performance for "Reflections Laughing"
Chart (2025)	Peak position
Australia (ARIA)	75
Canada Hot 100 (Billboard)	29
France (SNEP)	44
Global 200 (Billboard)	38
Greece International (IFPI)	12
Iceland (Tónlistinn)	22
Italy (FIMI)	74
Latvia (LaIPA)	14
Lithuania (AGATA)	33
New Zealand Hot Singles (RMNZ)	5
Poland (Polish Streaming Top 100)	84
South Africa (TOSAC)	62
Sweden (Sverigetopplistan)	82
UK Streaming (OCC)	72
US Billboard Hot 100	53

== Certifications ==
Certifications for "Reflections Laughing"
Region	Certification	Certified units/sales
Brazil (Pro-Música Brasil)	Gold	20,000^{‡}
Canada (Music Canada)	Gold	40,000^{‡}
^{‡} Sales+streaming figures based on certification alone.
