= Baptized in Fear =

2025 song by The Weeknd

Song by the Weeknd

from the album Hurry Up Tomorrow
- Released: January 31, 2025
- Studio: Conway (Los Angeles)
- Length: 3:52
- Label: XO; Republic
- Songwriters: Abel Tesfaye; Daniel Lopatin; Nathan Salon
- Producers: The Weeknd; OPN; Salon; Mike Dean

Music video
- "Baptized in Fear" on YouTube

"Baptized in Fear" is a song by Canadian singer-songwriter the Weeknd. It was released through XO and Republic Records as the sixth track from his sixth studio album, Hurry Up Tomorrow, on January 31, 2025. The audio video was originally released on YouTube on January 30th, hours ahead of the album's release. The song was written by The Weeknd, OPN, and Nathan Salon, all of whom produced it along with Mike Dean.

The music video's architecture heavily features striking Armenian church motifs, including a khachkar embedded into the drum of the structure.

== Composition and lyrics ==
On "Baptized in Fear", the Weeknd sings about letting his anxieties control him, expressing feelings of shame and guilt as he sings: "Figure in the corner laughing at me / Water fill my lungs, vision blurry". He shows his lyrical depth as he discusses the feelings of having a panic attack. Writing for Slant Magazine, Nick Seip felt that the song "sounds like a crisper, more confident version of the balladry" that is prevalent in the Weeknd's debut studio album, Kiss Land (2013). Carl Lamarre of Billboard ranked "Baptized in Fear" as the second best song on Hurry Up Tomorrow along with the song before it, "Until We're Skin & Bones", calling the latter song "The Weeknd at his peak form". The song was transitioned along with "Open Hearts" with the lyrics "Voices will tell me that I should carry on".

== Credits and personnel ==
Credits adapted from Tidal.

- The Weeknd – vocals, keyboard, synthesizer, programming, songwriting, production
- Mike Dean – synthesizer, production, mixing, mastering
- Nathan Salon – drums, programming, songwriting, production
- OPN – synthesizer, songwriting, production
- Sage Skolfield – vocal engineering, vocal production, mixing
- Tommy Rush – second engineering, mixing

== Charts ==
Chart performance for "Baptized in Fear"
Chart (2025)	Peak position
Australia (ARIA)	67
Canada Hot 100 (Billboard)	24
France (SNEP)	40
Global 200 (Billboard)	34
Greece International (IFPI)	7
Iceland (Tónlistinn)	23
India International (IMI)	10
Italy (FIMI)	71
Latvia (LaIPA)	12
Lithuania (AGATA)	23
New Zealand Hot Singles (RMNZ)	6
Poland (Polish Streaming Top 100)	71
South Africa (TOSAC)	63
Sweden (Sverigetopplistan)	60
UK Streaming (OCC)	61
US Billboard Hot 100	46
US Hot R&B/Hip-Hop Songs (Billboard)	12

== Certifications ==
Certifications for "Baptized in Fear"
Region	Certification	Certified units/sales
Brazil (Pro-Música Brasil)	Gold	20,000^{‡}
Canada (Music Canada)	Gold	40,000^{‡}
^{‡} Sales+streaming figures based on certification alone.
