= 4:23 =

Studio album by Mike Dean
- Released: April 30, 2023
- Genre: Electronic
- Length: 42:32
- Labels: M.W.A; Imperial
- Producers: Mike Dean; Sam Levinson; The Weeknd; Tommy Rush

Mike Dean chronology
Smoke State 42222 (2022)	4:23 (2023)	424 (2024)

4:23 is the fourth studio album by American record producer Mike Dean. It was released on April 30, 2023, by Dean's label, M.W.A Music and Imperial Records. Dean and Canadian singer-songwriter The Weeknd served as executive producers, while production was handled by the two alongside American filmmaker Sam Levinson and record producer Tommy Rush. The Weeknd also makes several uncredited vocal performances throughout the album. 4:23 is the fourth installment of the 4:20 series, following 4:20 (2020), 4:22 (2021) and Smoke State 42222 (2022), and preceding 424 (2024) and 425 (2025).

== Background ==
Mike Dean first teased work on a follow up to his previous 4:20 installments in April 2023 on social media. During the 2023 Coachella festival, it was revealed that Mike Dean would work with the Weeknd on songs for the new installment. Shortly after it was revealed that the Weeknd would executive produce the album, titled 4:23.

Mike Dean and the Weeknd previously worked together on the Weeknd's 2015 album Beauty Behind the Madness and the Fifty Shades of Grey soundtrack. In 2022, Mike Dean remixed the Weeknd's Dawn FM single "Starry Eyes" and supported the Weeknd on his After Hours til Dawn tour. They continued their collaboration on the soundtrack to the 2023 TV series The Idol together with Sam Levinson.

== Critical reception ==
Professional ratings
Review scores
Source	Rating
Pitchfork	5.0/10

In a positive review for Variety, A.D. Amorosi highlights the coherence of 4:23 as "equal parts steely sci-fi epic soundtrack and spaced-out dream-pop", while describing the Weeknd's lyrical content matter as "(willingly thrilling) bummer of the summer".

Reviewing 4:23 negatively for Pitchfork, Dylan Green draws similarities to the video game franchise Halo and the science fiction film Blade Runner, while describing 4:23 as generally "drab and soulless as a wall of code".

== Track listing ==
Credits adapted from Tidal. All tracks written and produced by Mike Dean, except where noted.

4:23 track listing
No.	Title	Writer(s)	Producer(s)	Length
1.	"Once Upon a Time"	Michael Dean; Abel Tesfaye; Jeremy Hartney; Louise Donegan; Thomas Mikailin	Mike Dean; The Weeknd; Tommy Rush	1:36
2.	"Artificial Intelligence"	Dean; Tesfaye	Dean; Sam Levinson; The Weeknd	2:55
3.	"Defame Moi"	Dean; Tesfaye	Dean; The Weeknd	1:46
4.	"More Coke!!"	Dean; Tesfaye	Dean; The Weeknd	2:52
5.	"Music for the Future"			4:28
6.	"Rewind Life"		Dean; Levinson	7:00
7.	"Goodbye Earth"			2:56
8.	"Hello Space"			3:15
9.	"Mechanical Tarantula"			5:05
10.	"118k"			3:37
11.	"Earth to Michael"	Dean; Donegan		2:36
12.	"Emotionless"	Dean; Tesfaye	Dean; The Weeknd	2:09
13.	"Electric Sheep"			2:16
Total length:				42:32

== Personnel ==
Credits adapted from Tidal.

- Mike Dean – mastering engineer, mixing engineer, synthesizer (all tracks)
- Darren King – drums (11)
- Louise Donegan – vocals (1, 11)
- Sage Skolfield – sound engineer (all tracks)
- Sean Solymar – sound engineer (all tracks)
- The Weeknd – uncredited vocals (2–4, 12)
- Tommy Rush – keyboards (1), sound engineer (all tracks)
