= Dancing in the Flames =

2024 single by the Weeknd

Single by the Weeknd
- Released: September 13, 2024
- Studio: Conway (Los Angeles); MXM (Stockholm); House Mouse (Stockholm)
- Genre: Synth-pop; dance-pop
- Length: 3:40
- Label: XO; Republic
- Songwriters: Abel Tesfaye; Karl Sandberg; Oscar Holter
- Producers: The Weeknd; Max Martin; Oscar Holter

The Weeknd singles chronology
| "We Still Don't Trust You" (2024) | "Dancing in the Flames" (2024) | "Timeless" (2024) |

Music video
- "Dancing in the Flames" on YouTube

"Dancing in the Flames" is a song by the Canadian singer and songwriter The Weeknd. It was released on September 13, 2024, as a standalone single through XO and Republic Records. It was originally intended to be the lead single from the album Hurry Up Tomorrow, but was later excluded from the final track listing. The day after its release, a live version of the song was released. On September 16, 2024, an acoustic version accompanied by a music video was also released. An EP with previously mentioned versions and an instrumental and a cappella version was released the same day. The synth-pop track was met with positive reviews from music critics and debuted at number 14 on the Billboard Hot 100 chart. In 2026, Tesfaye added the track as a bonus song to the After Hours Till Dawn Edition of Hurry Up Tomorrow.

== Background and composition ==
The Weeknd first performed the song live on September 7, 2024, at his one-night-only concert in Estádio do Morumbi, São Paulo, Brazil. The song was announced on September 9, 2024, as the original lead single from his then-upcoming sixth studio album, Hurry Up Tomorrow (2025), through Apple's "It's Glowtime" event promoting the iPhone 16 Pro. The song was later omitted from the final tracklist for unknown reasons.

"Dancing in the Flames" is performed in the key of D♭ major in common time with a tempo of 117 beats per minute. The Weeknd's vocals span from F_{4} to B♭_{5} in the song.

== Critical reception ==
The song was well received by music critics. Alexis Petridis from The Guardian gave the song four out of five stars, commenting the singer "revisits his usual theme of nihilistic love and his beloved palette of 80s synths, but it's melodically solid and there are some tweaks to the formula". Alexa Camp of Slant Magazine wrote that the song "marks a turn back toward a lighter pop sound", in which "the singer once again associating romantic longing with the risk of physical danger".

== Music video ==
A behind-the-scenes look at the music video was first shown at Apple's iPhone 16 launch event on September 9, 2024. The music video was shot entirely on the iPhone 16 Pro, and is directed by Anton Tammi, who previously directed the video for "Blinding Lights".

== Track listing ==
Streaming/digital download – single

1. "Dancing in the Flames" – 3:40
2. "Dancing in the Flames" (acoustic) – 3:28
3. "Dancing in the Flames" (live from São Paulo) – 5:12
4. "Dancing in the Flames" (instrumental) – 3:42
5. "Dancing in the Flames" (a cappella) – 3:24

== Credits and personnel ==
Credits adapted from Tidal.

- The Weeknd – vocals, songwriting, production
- Max Martin – songwriting, production
- Oscar Holter – songwriting, production
- Şerban Ghenea - studio personnel, mixing
- Dave Kutch – studio personnel, mastering
- Mike Dean – mastering
- Eric Eylands - studio personnel, engineering
- Sage Skolfield - studio personnel, engineering
- Sam Holland - studio personnel, engineering

== Charts ==
=== Weekly charts ===
Weekly chart performance for "Dancing in the Flames"
| Chart (2024–2025) | Peak position |
|---|---|
| Australia (ARIA) | 19 |
| Australia Hip Hop/R&B (ARIA) | 2 |
| Austria (Ö3 Austria Top 40) | 25 |
| Belarus Airplay (TopHit) | 6 |
| Belgium (Ultratop 50 Flanders) | 22 |
| Belgium (Ultratop 50 Wallonia) | 8 |
| Brazil Hot 100 (Billboard) | 92 |
| Bulgaria Airplay (PROPHON) | 4 |
| Canada Hot 100 (Billboard) | 15 |
| Canada AC (Billboard) | 6 |
| Canada CHR/Top 40 (Billboard) | 7 |
| Canada Hot AC (Billboard) | 6 |
| CIS Airplay (TopHit) | 1 |
| Croatia International Airplay (Top lista) | 4 |
| Czech Republic Airplay (ČNS IFPI) | 9 |
| Czech Republic Singles Digital (ČNS IFPI) | 70 |
| Denmark (Tracklisten) | 23 |
| Estonia Airplay (TopHit) | 5 |
| Finland (Suomen virallinen lista) | 28 |
| France (SNEP) | 31 |
| Germany (GfK) | 13 |
| Global 200 (Billboard) | 10 |
| Greece International Streaming (IFPI) | 6 |
| Hungary (Editors' Choice Top 40) | 12 |
| Iceland (Tónlistinn) | 17 |
| India International Streaming (IMI) | 4 |
| Ireland (IRMA) | 18 |
| Italy (FIMI) | 37 |
| Japan Hot Overseas (Billboard Japan) | 2 |
| Kazakhstan Airplay (TopHit) | 1 |
| Latvia Airplay (LaIPA) | 6 |
| Latvia Streaming (LaIPA) | 11 |
| Lebanon (Lebanese Top 20) | 8 |
| Lithuania (AGATA) | 14 |
| Lithuania Airplay (TopHit) | 4 |
| Luxembourg (Billboard) | 16 |
| Malaysia (Billboard) | 21 |
| Malaysia International Streaming (RIM) | 18 |
| Moldova Airplay (TopHit) | 37 |
| Netherlands (Dutch Top 40) | 16 |
| Netherlands (Single Top 100) | 35 |
| New Zealand (Recorded Music NZ) | 32 |
| Norway (VG-lista) | 20 |
| Philippines (Philippines Hot 100) | 88 |
| Poland (Polish Airplay Top 100) | 25 |
| Poland (Polish Streaming Top 100) | 43 |
| Portugal (AFP) | 19 |
| Romania Airplay (TopHit) | 27 |
| Russia Airplay (TopHit) | 32 |
| San Marino Airplay (SMRTV Top 50) | 2 |
| Serbia Airplay (Radiomonitor) | 1 |
| Singapore (RIAS) | 11 |
| Slovakia Airplay (ČNS IFPI) | 2 |
| Slovakia Singles Digital (ČNS IFPI) | 25 |
| Slovenia Airplay (Radiomonitor) | 8 |
| South Africa Streaming (TOSAC) | 9 |
| South Korea BGM (Circle) | 43 |
| South Korea Download (Circle) | 84 |
| Spain (Promusicae) | 77 |
| Sweden (Sverigetopplistan) | 10 |
| Switzerland (Schweizer Hitparade) | 12 |
| Turkey International Airplay (Radiomonitor Türkiye) | 7 |
| Ukraine Airplay (TopHit) | 52 |
| UK Singles (Official Charts) | 12 |
| US Billboard Hot 100 | 14 |
| US Adult Contemporary (Billboard) | 21 |
| US Adult Pop Airplay (Billboard) | 11 |
| US Dance Airplay (Billboard) | 30 |
| US Pop Airplay (Billboard) | 8 |
| US Rhythmic Airplay (Billboard) | 6 |
| Venezuela Airplay (Record Report) | 80 |
| Venezuela Anglo Airplay (Monitor Latino) | 2 |

=== Monthly charts ===
Monthly chart performance for "Dancing in the Flames"
| Chart (2024) | Peak position |
|---|---|
| Belarus Airplay (TopHit) | 12 |
| CIS Airplay (TopHit) | 2 |
| Estonia Airplay (TopHit) | 8 |
| Kazakhstan Airplay (TopHit) | 7 |
| Latvia Airplay (TopHit) | 1 |
| Lithuania Airplay (TopHit) | 4 |
| Paraguay Airplay (SGP) | 21 |
| Romania Airplay (TopHit) | 30 |
| Russia Airplay (TopHit) | 4 |
| Slovakia (Rádio Top 100) | 21 |
| Ukraine Airplay (TopHit) | 76 |

=== Year-end charts ===
2024 year-end chart performance for "Dancing in the Flames"
| Chart (2024) | Position |
|---|---|
| Belarus Airplay (TopHit) | 114 |
| CIS Airplay (TopHit) | 45 |
| Estonia Airplay (TopHit) | 74 |
| Kazakhstan Airplay (TopHit) | 194 |
| Netherlands (Dutch Top 40) | 71 |
| Romania Airplay (TopHit) | 136 |
| Russia Airplay (TopHit) | 67 |

2025 year-end chart performance for "Dancing in the Flames"
| Chart (2025) | Position |
|---|---|
| Argentina Anglo Airplay (Monitor Latino) | 75 |
| Belarus Airplay (TopHit) | 171 |
| Belgium (Ultratop 50 Wallonia) | 172 |
| Canada (Canadian Hot 100) | 95 |
| Canada AC (Billboard) | 7 |
| Canada CHR/Top 40 (Billboard) | 19 |
| Canada Hot AC (Billboard) | 7 |
| CIS Airplay (TopHit) | 56 |
| Kazakhstan Airplay (TopHit) | 141 |
| Romania Airplay (TopHit) | 137 |
| Russia Airplay (TopHit) | 88 |
| US Adult Pop Airplay (Billboard) | 43 |
| US Pop Airplay (Billboard) | 32 |
| US Rhythmic Airplay (Billboard) | 44 |

== Certifications ==
Certifications for "Dancing in the Flames"
| Region | Certification | Certified units/sales |
|---|---|---|
| Austria (IFPI Austria) | Gold | 15,000^{‡} |
| Belgium (BRMA) | Gold | 20,000^{‡} |
| Brazil (Pro-Música Brasil) | 2× Platinum | 80,000^{‡} |
| Canada (Music Canada) | Gold | 40,000^{‡} |
| Denmark (IFPI Danmark) | Gold | 45,000^{‡} |
| France (SNEP) | Platinum | 200,000^{‡} |
| United Kingdom (BPI) | Silver | 200,000^{‡} |
^{‡} Sales+streaming figures based on certification alone.

== Release history ==
Release history and formats for "Dancing in the Flames"
| Region | Date | Format | Label | Ref. |
|---|---|---|---|---|
| Various | September 13, 2024 | Digital download; streaming | XO; Republic | |
| Italy | September 13, 2024 | Radio airplay | Universal | |
| United States | September 13, 2024 | CD | XO; Republic | |
| United States | September 17, 2024 | Contemporary hit radio | XO; Republic | |
