= Cry for Me (The Weeknd song) =

2025 single by the Weeknd

Single by the Weeknd

from the album Hurry Up Tomorrow
- Released: February 4, 2025
- Studio: Light Sonic Division (Woodland Hills)
- Length: 3:45
- Label: XO; Republic
- Songwriters: Abel Tesfaye; Michael Dean; Leland Wayne; Ahmad Balshe; Karen Patterson; Curtis Williams
- Producers: The Weeknd; Mike Dean; Metro Boomin

The Weeknd singles chronology
"São Paulo" (2024)	"Cry for Me" (2025)	"Rather Lie" (2025)

Audio sample
- "Cry for Me": file; help

Music video
- "Cry for Me" on YouTube

"Cry for Me" is a song by Canadian singer and songwriter the Weeknd. Originally released as a track on January 31, 2025, it was sent to US contemporary and rhythmic radio through XO and Republic Records as the third single from his sixth studio album, Hurry Up Tomorrow, on February 4, 2025. The song was produced by the Weeknd himself, Mike Dean, and Metro Boomin, with all three of them writing it alongside Belly, Karen Patterson, and Curtis Williams. Following the release of the album, the song received widespread critical acclaim, and was an immediate commercial success, reaching the top ten in the United Kingdom and Canada, and top 40 in various countries, including number 12 in the United States and topping the charts in Greece.

== Background and release ==
The song, which was first released as the second track of Hurry Up Tomorrow, was released as the third single off the album on February 4, 2025.

== Composition and lyrics ==
On the song, the Weeknd says that he feels trapped in a "penthouse prison" as he expresses his internal feelings of pain and suffering. Carl Lamarre of Billboard ranked "Cry for Me" as the ninth best song on the album as he felt that "The Weeknd's vulnerability is palpable as he positions Hurry Up Tomorrow as his swan song" and "he leans into his mortality and departure, realizing it may be too late to resuscitate his relationship". The song is composed in the key of G minor with a tempo of 120 BPM.

== Music video ==
The music video for "Cry for Me" was released on February 11, 2025. Self-directed by the Weeknd, the black-and-white visual features the singer in a sparkling outfit with a hood covering part of his face, as he walks towards a young woman in the pitch black. The scene frequently flashes to the musician wandering a city and the woman crying thick, dark liquid.

== Credits and personnel ==
Credits adapted from first pressing credits and Tidal.

- The Weeknd – vocals, keyboards, programming, songwriting, production
- Mike Dean – synthesizer, songwriting, production, mixing, mastering
- OPN – synthesizer
- Metro Boomin – songwriting, production
- Sage Skolfield – engineering, vocal engineering, vocal producer, mixing
- Tommy Rush – engineering, second engineering, assistant mixing
- Shin Kamiyama – engineering
- Nathan Salon – engineering
- Faris Al-Majed – recording, second engineering
- Ahmad Balshe – songwriting
- Curtis Fitzgerald Williams – songwriting
- Lynette K. Patterson – songwriting

== Charts ==
=== Weekly charts ===
Weekly chart performance
Chart (2025–2026)	Peak position
Australia (ARIA)	20
Austria (Ö3 Austria Top 40)	24
Belgium (Ultratop 50 Wallonia)	12
Canada Hot 100 (Billboard)	8
Canada AC (Billboard)	25
Canada CHR/Top 40 (Billboard)	6
Canada Hot AC (Billboard)	15
Croatia International Airplay (Top lista)	96
Czech Republic Singles Digital (ČNS IFPI)	30
Denmark (Tracklisten)	23
Dominican Republic Anglo (Monitor Latino)	1
Dominican Republic Anglo Airplay (Monitor Latino)	4
Estonia Airplay (TopHit)	9
Finland (Suomen virallinen lista)	21
Finland Airplay (Radiosoittolista)	32
France (SNEP)	15
Germany (GfK)	68
Global 200 (Billboard)	7
Greece International (IFPI)	1
Hungary (Single Top 40)	18
Iceland (Tónlistinn)	10
India International (IMI)	4
Ireland (IRMA)	29
Italy (FIMI)	20
Japan Hot Overseas (Billboard Japan)	16
Latvia Streaming (LaIPA)	4
Lebanon Airplay (Lebanese Top 20)	7
Lithuania (AGATA)	11
Luxembourg (Billboard)	8
Malaysia International (RIM)	19
Mexico Anglo Airplay (Monitor Latino)	9
Netherlands (Dutch Top 40)	26
Netherlands (Single Top 100)	24
New Zealand (Recorded Music NZ)	35
Nicaragua Anglo Airplay (Monitor Latino)	2
Nigeria (TurnTable Top 100)	60
Norway (VG-lista)	14
Poland (Polish Streaming Top 100)	14
Puerto Rico Anglo Airplay (Monitor Latino)	6
Romania (Billboard)	6
San Marino Airplay (SMRTV Top 50)	14
Serbia Airplay (Radiomonitor)	10
Singapore (RIAS)	19
Slovakia Singles Digital (ČNS IFPI)	8
South Africa (TOSAC)	30
Spain (Promusicae)	76
Sweden (Sverigetopplistan)	12
Switzerland (Schweizer Hitparade)	11
Turkey International Airplay (Radiomonitor Türkiye)	2
UK Singles (Official Charts)	8
UK Hip Hop/R&B (Official Charts)	2
US Billboard Hot 100	12
US Adult Contemporary (Billboard)	14
US Adult Pop Airplay (Billboard)	15
US Dance Airplay (Billboard)	36
US Hot R&B/Hip-Hop Songs (Billboard)	4
US Pop Airplay (Billboard)	5
US R&B/Hip-Hop Airplay (Billboard)	35
US Rhythmic Airplay (Billboard)	1

=== Monthly charts ===
Monthly chart performance
Chart (2025)	Position
Estonia Airplay (TopHit)	18
Lithuania Airplay (TopHit)	23

=== Year-end charts ===
Year-end chart performance
Chart (2025)	Position
Belgium (Ultratop 50 Wallonia)	43
Canada (Canadian Hot 100)	54
Canada AC (Billboard)	45
Canada CHR/Top 40 (Billboard)	9
Canada Hot AC (Billboard)	18
Estonia Airplay (TopHit)	138
France (SNEP)	200
Iceland (Tónlistinn)	94
India International (IMI)	10
US Billboard Hot 100	73
US Adult Pop Airplay (Billboard)	46
US Hot R&B/Hip-Hop Songs (Billboard)	12
US Pop Airplay (Billboard)	17
US Rhythmic Airplay (Billboard)	12

== Certifications ==
Certifications for "Cry for Me"
Region	Certification	Certified units/sales
Belgium (BRMA)	Gold	20,000^{‡}
Brazil (Pro-Música Brasil)	2× Platinum	80,000^{‡}
Canada (Music Canada)	2× Platinum	160,000^{‡}
France (SNEP)	Platinum	200,000^{‡}
United Kingdom (BPI)	Silver	200,000^{‡}
Streaming
Greece (IFPI Greece)	Platinum	2,000,000^{†}
^{‡} Sales+streaming figures based on certification alone.^{†} Streaming-only figures based on certification alone.

== Release history ==
Release history and formats for "Cry for Me"
Region	Date	Format	Label	Ref.
United States	February 4, 2025	Contemporary hit radio	XO; Republic	
United States	February 4, 2025	Rhythmic contemporary radio	XO; Republic	
Italy	February 5, 2025	Radio airplay	Universal	
