= Mike Dean (music producer) =

American audio engineer and record producer (born 1965)

- Also known as: Vador; Synth God
- Born: Michael George Dean; March 1, 1965 (age 61); Houston, Texas, U.S.
- Genres: Hip-hop; electronic
- Occupations: Audio engineer; composer; record producer; multi-instrumentalist
- Instruments: Guitar; keyboards; piano; bass guitar
- Years active: 1983–present
- Labels: M.W.A; Imperial; GOOD; Dean's List
- Publisher: Sony Music Publishing
- Website: therealmikedean.com

Michael George Dean (born March 1, 1965) is an American audio engineer, record producer, and multi-instrumentalist. He is known for his synthesizer-heavy instrumentation, guitar solos, outros, and audio mixing for high-profile music industry artists. Beginning his career in 1992, he was first credited on releases for Texas-based rappers Scarface, Willie D, and Geto Boys, though he has since worked with hip-hop and pop artists including Kanye West, the Weeknd, Beyoncé, Kid Cudi, Travis Scott, Jay-Z, Drake, Madonna, Selena Gomez, Playboi Carti, and Lana Del Rey, among others. As a non-performing lead artist, Dean has released six solo studio albums: 4:20 (2020), 4:22 (2021), Smoke State 42222 (2022), 4:23 (2023), 424 (2024) and 425 (2025).

== Early life ==
Michael George Dean was born in Houston in 1965, and was raised "on a bayou" ten miles from Angleton. His mother was an art teacher, and his father, who died when Dean was a child, designed chemical plants for Dow. His siblings were musical, and Dean began playing the piano when he was 8, taking lessons in classical piano until he was 20. He also raced in motocross events for Suzuki. Dean founded his first band in ninth grade, inspired by classic and progressive rock. Dean hoped to work as a musician, and was offered scholarships by the Eastman School of Music and Berklee College of Music. However, prior to graduation, he had been put into contact with Abraham Quintanilla, the father and manager of Tejano singer Selena, who was searching for a new keyboardist after marital troubles resulted in the departure of two of Selena y Los Dinos' members. Dean successfully auditioned for the role, and became a touring member of the band immediately after graduation.

== Career ==
Dean worked with Selena for four years, eventually becoming her musical director and producer. He began his career in hip-hop while producing two albums as a part of the Houston-based group, Def Squad, along with group member Norris Burse (Champ) and Kenny Bomer (KB) under the Mr. Henry/ Ichiban labels. Dean first became widely known for pioneering the Dirty South sound in the 1990s, particularly in work for artists from Rap-A-Lot Records, where he worked as a sound engineer and in-house session musician. Dean has most notably worked alongside Scarface of the Geto Boys, Do or Die, Tha Dogg Pound, Yukmouth of the Luniz, C-Bo, Nate Dogg, Tech N9ne, UGK, Z-Ro, Devin the Dude, Outlawz, and 2Pac.

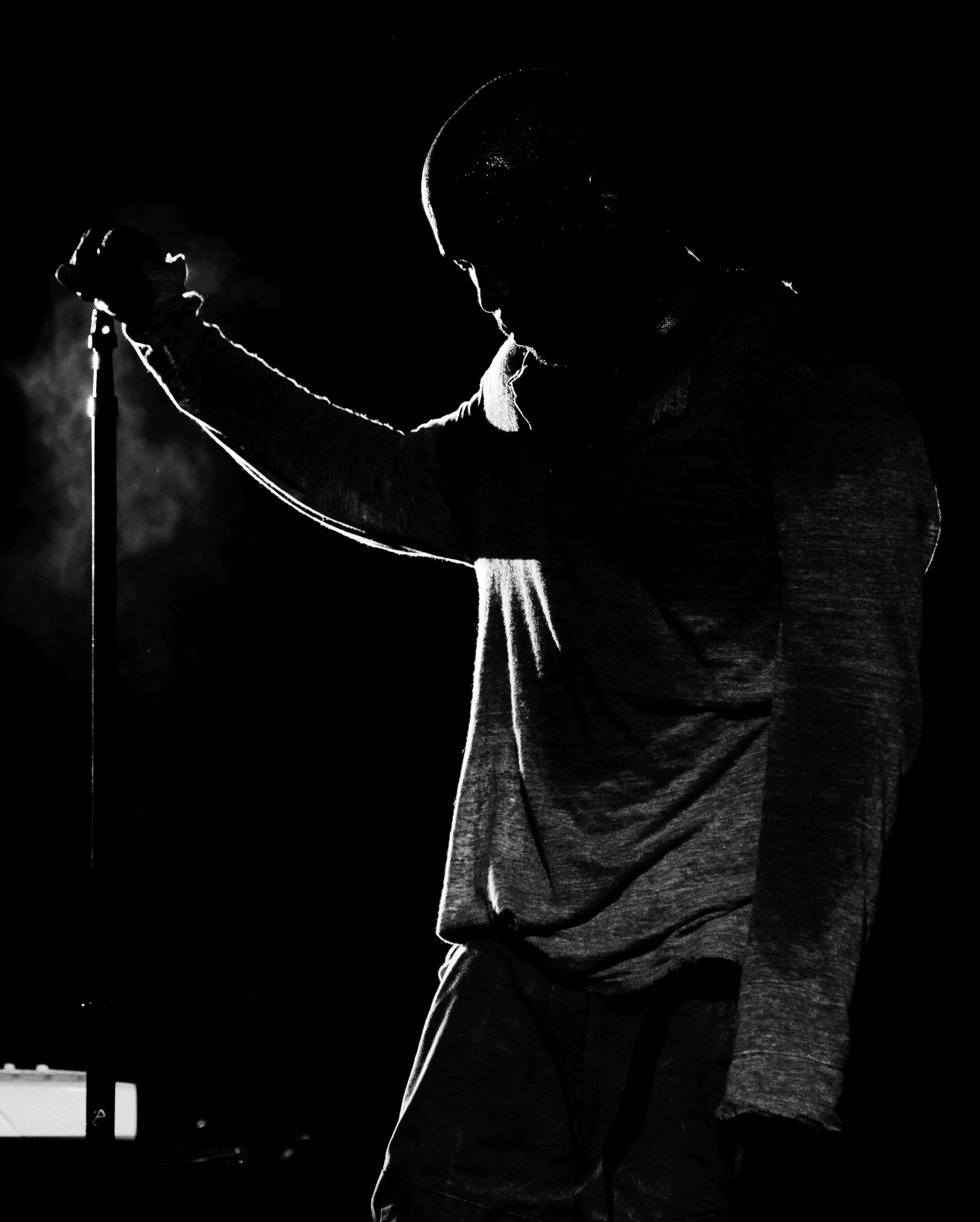
Kanye West performing in 2013

Dean went on to mix, produce, and master widely throughout American hip-hop. He has become known for producing work with Kanye West. After initially contributing to the mixing of West's albums The College Dropout and Late Registration, Dean contributed as producer on West's albums Graduation, My Beautiful Dark Twisted Fantasy, Yeezus, The Life of Pablo, Ye, and Donda. He also co-produced with West on his collaboration album with Jay-Z, Watch the Throne. Dean was an additional producer on "Mercy" and "Higher" from GOOD Music's 2012 compilation album Cruel Summer.

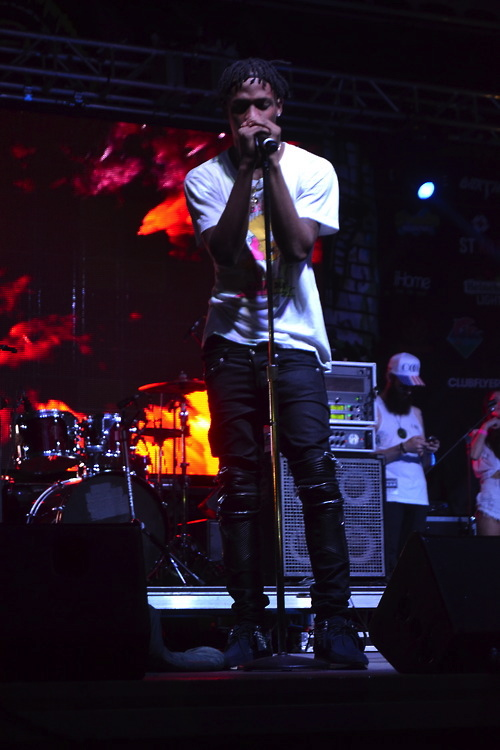
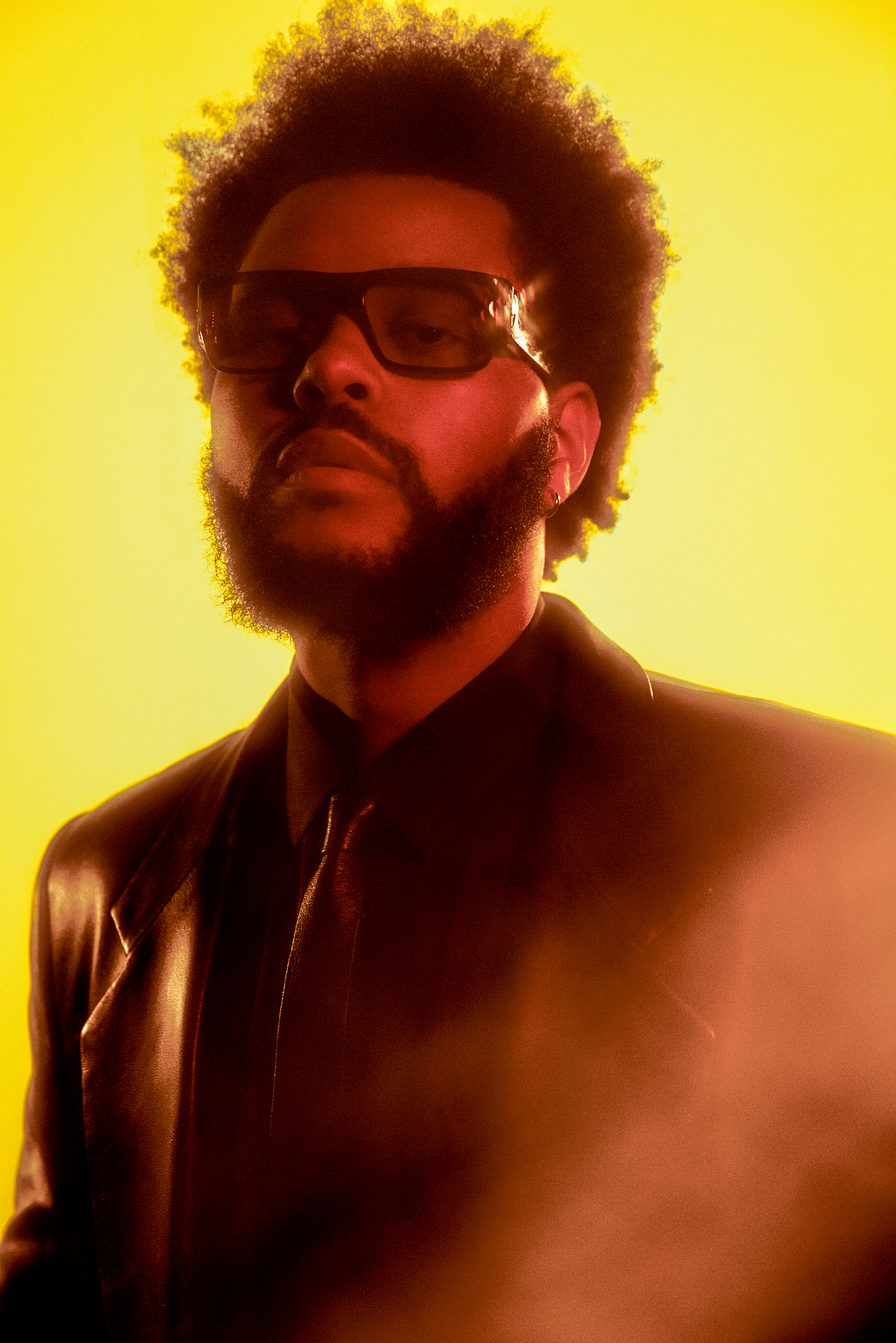
Dean would later go on to regularly collaborate with other music artists such as American rapper Travis Scott and Canadian singer the Weeknd

In recent years, Dean has served as a regular guitarist and keyboardist for West and Travis Scott at their live performances, being West's Watch the Throne Tour, the Yeezus Tour, and Saint Pablo Tour alongside Scott's Birds Eye View Tour and Astroworld – Wish You Were Here Tour. Dean has also been a frequent collaborator with Scott. Dean's production has appeared on every one of Scott's musical bodies of work since 2013. In 2016, Dean mastered Frank Ocean's visual album Endless, wrote and produced tracks on Desiigner's mixtape New English, and produced Desiigner's single "Tiimmy Turner".

In May 2017, Dean announced he was launching a record label by the name of M.W.A. When asked what made him decide that now would be the best time to unveil his new record label, Dean responded: "Just a lot of new young artists that's been asking to get down with me and have me work on their projects and help them get deals. I figured I'd start a label and sign some new acts. Seems like a good time to start it. I got a studio out here [in Los Angeles] and I'm able to meet a lot of new artists." When asked the meaning of M.W.A, Dean answered: "That's just what I call myself when I DJ. Mexican Wrestling Association. It's something that I've done with the merch, so I just figured I'd keep the name going." He also revealed Dice Soho the first artist he signed to M.W.A: "One of my homies Gustavo Guerra brought [Dice Soho] to me. I think he's gonna be the next wave out of Houston. I picked him up. Dice has a nice swag."

He released an instrumental mixtape, 4:20, on April 20, 2020. On May 20, 2021, Lana Del Rey's single "Wildflower Wildfire" was released, which was produced by Dean. In an interview with Anthony Fantano before the song's release, Dean said that he was "planning on working with [Del Rey] a lot".

Since 2022, Dean has had several further collaborations with the Weeknd, who Dean has worked with on the Weeknd's 2014 promotional single "King of the Fall" as a co-writer. In 2015, Dean collaborated with the Weeknd on "Tell Your Friends" from the album Beauty Behind the Madness, on which he co-produced and played guitar, as well as his single "Where You Belong" for the Fifty Shades of Grey soundtrack. Dean contributed live arrangements to the Weeknd's co-headlining performances with Swedish House Mafia at the 2022 Coachella festival. Dean has since been an opening act on the Weeknd's After Hours til Dawn Tour, during which his arrangements have been included in the Weeknd's shows. Dean also created a remix for the Weeknd's song "Starry Eyes" from his album Dawn FM, which Dean has performed live in his opening sets on the tour; he has become a touring musician for The Weeknd since the 2023 European and Latin American legs of the tour and onward. He plays synthesizers and saxophone. Dean contributed the musical arrangements for the "After Hours Nightmare" Halloween Horror Nights haunted houses at Universal Studios Florida and Hollywood. In 2023, Dean contributed live arrangements to Metro Boomin's performances at Coachella, during which the Weeknd appeared as a special guest; Dean also appeared as a guest musician during 070 Shake's performance during the second weekend of the festival.

He co-wrote and produced the Weeknd's single "Double Fantasy," "Popular," "The Lure (Main Theme," "Family," "Devil's Paradise," "A Lesser Man," "Take Me Back," "One of the Girls," "Jealous Guy," "Fill the Void," "Like a God," "False Idols," "Dollhouse," and "My Sweet Lord" for the soundtrack of the Weeknd's HBO series The Idol, which Dean is part of the starring cast of, and premiered on June 4. Dean released his fourth mixtape, 4:23, which the Weeknd co-produced, on April 29.

Since 2024, Dean has co-written and produced "Young Metro," "We Still Don't Trust You," "All to Myself," and "Always Be My Fault" by Future and Metro Boomin with the Weeknd from the former two's respective albums We Don't Trust You and We Still Don't Trust You, on which Dean is also credited with producing "Beat It." On the Weeknd's 2025 album Hurry Up Tomorrow, Dean co-wrote and produced the tracks "Wake Me Up," "Cry for Me," "São Paulo," "Until We're Skin in Bones," "Baptized in Fear," "Opening Night," "Reflections Laughing," "Enjoy the Show," "Given Up on Me," "I Can't Wait to Get There," "Timeless," "Niagara Falls," "Take Me Back to LA," and "Big Sleep".

== Discography ==
Studio albums

- 4:20 (2020)
- 4:22 (2021)
- Smoke State 42222 (2022)
- 4:23 (2023)
- 424 (2024)
- 425 (2025)

Live albums

- Echoplex (Live 2021) (2021)

== Production discography ==
=== 1980s ===
- Def Squad, Texas

=== 1990s ===
1992

- Bushwick Bill – Little Big Man
- UGK – Too Hard to Swallow
- Willie D – I'm Goin' Out Lika Soldier

1993

- 5th Ward Boyz – Ghetto Dope
- Ganksta NIP – Psychic Thoughts
- DMG – Rigormortiz
- Abdullahi A - "Crashin'"

1994

- 5th Ward Boyz – Gangsta Funk
- Big Mello – Wegonefunkwichamind
- Big Mike – Somethin' Serious
- Blac Monks – Secrets of the Hidden Temple
- Odd Squad – Fadanuf Fa Erybody!!
- Scarface – The Diary

1995

- 5th Ward Boyz – Rated G
- Bushwick Bill - Phantom of the Rapra
- Immature - "Just a Little Bit (We Got It)"
- Jamal – Last Chance, No Breaks
- Menace Clan – Da Hood
- Monica - "Before You Walk Out of My Life (Remix)"
- Poppa LQ - "Housen the Scene"
- 5th Ward Juvennilez - Deadly Groundz

1996

- Various Artists - High School High (soundtrack)
- Various Artists - Original Gangstas (soundtrack)
- 3-2 – The Wicked Buddah Baby
- Quindon - "Dream About You"
- Do or Die – Picture This
- Facemob – The Other Side of the Law
- Rappin' 4-Tay - Off Parole
- Ganksta NIP – Psychotic Genius
- Geto Boys – The Resurrection

1997

- 3X Krazy – Stackin Chips
- 5th Ward Boyz - Usual Suspects
- Big Mike – Still Serious
- Eternal - "Dreams (Mike Dean Remix)"
- Immature - The Journey
- Luniz - Lunitik Muzik
- Scarface –The Untouchable
- Scarface - "Mary Jane (Mike Dean's Xtra Remix)"
- Seagram – Souls on Ice

1998

- Various Artists- Caught Up (soundtrack)
- A-G-2-A-Ke – Mil-Ticket
- Devin the Dude – The Dude
- Do or Die – Headz or Tailz
- Ganksta NIP – Interview with a Killa
- Geto Boys - Da Good da Bad & da Ugly
- Scarface - My Homies
- Yukmouth – Thugged Out: The Albulation

=== 2000s ===
2000

- C-Bo – Enemy of the State
- Do or Die - Victory
- Outlawz – Ride wit Us or Collide wit Us
- Scarface – The Last of a Dying Breed

2001

- Jennifer Lopez & Daz Dillinger – Play (Jennifer Lopez song) Mike Dean Remix
- Kurupt - Space Boogie: Smoke Oddessey
- Oz (soundtrack)
- Tha Dogg Pound – Dillinger & Young Gotti
- Yukmouth – Thug Lord: The New Testament
- Sherm – Sherm Smoke

2002

- Big Syke – Big Syke
- Daz Dillinger – This Is the Life I Lead
- Devin the Dude – Just Tryin' ta Live
- E-40 – Grit & Grind
- Hussein Fatal – Fatal
- Kastro & E.D.I. Mean – Blood Brothers
- King T – The Kingdom Come
- Scarface – The Fix
- Young Noble – Noble Justice

2003

- Scarface - Balls and My Word
- Yukmouth – Godzilla

2004

- Devin the Dude - To Tha X+Treme
- Z-Ro – The Life of Joseph W. McVey
- Shyne – Godfather Buried Alive
- Kanye West – The College Dropout

2005

- Bun B - Trill
- Geto Boys – The Foundation
- Pimp C – Sweet James Jones Stories
- Z-Ro – Let the Truth Be Told
- Kanye West – Late Registration

2006

- Juvenile – Reality Check
- Pimp C – Pimpalation
- Scarface - My Homies Part 2
- Z-Ro – I'm Still Livin'

2007

- Kanye West – Graduation
- Scarface – Made

2008

- Kanye West – 808s & Heartbreak

2009

- Mike Jones – The Voice
- UGK – UGK 4 Life

=== 2010s ===
2010

- Kanye West – My Beautiful Dark Twisted Fantasy
- Kid Cudi – Man on the Moon II: The Legend of Mr. Rager
- Pimp C - The Naked Soul of Sweet Jones
- Z-Ro – Heroin

2011

- Jay-Z & Kanye West – Watch the Throne

2012

- GOOD Music – Cruel Summer

2013

- Beyoncé – Beyoncé
- Big Sean - Hall of Fame
- Jay-Z – Magna Carta Holy Grail
- Kanye West – Yeezus
- Angel Haze – Dirty Gold
- Travis Scott – Owl Pharaoh

2014

- Rick Ross - Mastermind
- Travis Scott – Days Before Rodeo
- Freddie Gibbs & Mike Dean – "Sellin' Dope"

2015

- The Weeknd - "Where You Belong"
- ASAP Rocky - At. Long. Last. ASAP
- Madonna – Rebel Heart
- Travis Scott – Rodeo
- Freddie Gibbs – Shadow of a Doubt
- Scarface - Deeply Rooted
- The Weeknd – Beauty Behind the Madness
- Justin Bieber – No Sense

2016

- Beyoncé – Lemonade
- D.R.A.M. - Big Baby DRAM
- Kanye West – The Life of Pablo
- Desiigner – New English
- Frank Ocean – Endless
- Frank Ocean – Blonde
- Travis Scott – Birds in the Trap Sing McKnight
- Ty Dolla Sign – Campaign
- Yung Lean – Warlord
- 2 Chainz – Hibachi for Lunch
- Kid Cudi – Passion, Pain & Demon Slayin'
- Z-Ro – Legendary

2017

- 2 Chainz – Pretty Girls Like Trap Music
- Vic Mensa – The Autobiography
- Lunice – CCCLX
- Ty Dolla Sign – Beach House 3
- Huncho Jack – Huncho Jack, Jack Huncho

2018

- AJ Mitchell – Skyview
- Migos – Culture II
- Desiigner – L.O.D.
- Pusha T – Daytona
- Kanye West – Ye
- Kanye West – "Lift Yourself"
- Dermot Kennedy – Mike Dean Presents: Dermot Kennedy
- Kids See Ghosts – Kids See Ghosts
- Christina Aguilera – Liberation
- Nas – Nasir
- The Carters – Everything Is Love
- Teyana Taylor – K.T.S.E.
- Travis Scott – Astroworld
- Genetikk – Y.A.L.A

2019

- 2 Chainz – Rap or Go to the League
- Madonna – Madame X
- Maxo Kream – Brandon Banks
- Kanye West – Jesus Is King
- Pusha T - "Coming Home"
- City Morgue – City Morgue Vol 2: As Good as Dead
- Smokepurpp – Deadstar 2
- Sunday Service Choir – Jesus Is Born
- JackBoys & Travis Scott – JackBoys

=== 2020s ===
2020

- Selena Gomez – Rare
- 070 Shake – Modus Vivendi
- Gorillaz - Song Machine, Season One: Strange Timez
- Don Toliver – Heaven or Hell
- Teyana Taylor – The Album
- Future - High Off Life
- Pop Smoke – Shoot for the Stars, Aim for the Moon
- Burna Boy – Twice as Tall
- Spillage Village, JID & EarthGang – Spilligion
- 2 Chainz – So Help Me God!
- Kid Cudi – Man on the Moon III: The Chosen

2021

- Kanye West – Donda
- Lana Del Rey – Blue Banisters
- Don Toliver – Life of a Don
- Mike Dean & Rich the Kid – "Blue Cheese"
- Aaliyah – "Poison"

2022

- FKA Twigs – Caprisongs
- Kanye West – Donda 2
- Fivio Foreign – B.I.B.L.E.
- Pusha T – It's Almost Dry
- Megan Thee Stallion – Traumazine
- Weiland – Vices
- 070 Shake – You Can't Kill Me
- XXXTentacion – Look at Me: The Album
- Beyoncé – Renaissance
- The Game – Drillmatic – Heart vs. Mind
- Nav – Demons Protected by Angels
- Christine and the Queens – Redcar les adorables étoiles (prologue)

2023

- Quavo – "Without You"
- The Weeknd - The Idol (TV) & soundtrack
- Christine and the Queens – Paranoia, Angels, True Love
- Metro Boomin – Spider-Man: Across the Spider-Verse (soundtrack)
- Travis Scott – Utopia
- 2 Chainz & Lil Wayne – Welcome 2 Collegrove

2024

- Future & Metro Boomin – We Don't Trust You
- Future & Metro Boomin – We Still Don't Trust You
- Mau P – On Again
- Duki – Ameri

2025

- The Weeknd – Hurry Up Tomorrow
- Playboi Carti - Music

2026

- ASAP Rocky - Don't Be Dumb
- Don Toliver - Octane
- Brent Faiyaz - Icon

== Filmography ==
Year	Title	Role	Notes	Ref.
2023	The Idol	Himself	Guest star	

== Awards and nominations ==
=== Grammy Awards ===
Year	Nominee / work	Award	Result	Ref.
2005	The College Dropout (as engineer/mixer)	Album of the Year	Nominated	
2006	"Gold Digger" (as engineer/mixer)	Record of the Year	Nominated	
2006	Late Registration (as engineer/mixer)	Best Rap Album	Won	
2006	Late Registration (as engineer/mixer)	Album of the Year	Nominated	
2008	Graduation (as engineer)	Album of the Year	Nominated	
2008	Graduation (as engineer)	Best Rap Album	Won	
2008	"Good Life" (as songwriter)	Best Rap Song	Won	
2012	My Beautiful Dark Twisted Fantasy (as engineer/mixer)	Best Rap Album	Won	
2013	"Niggas in Paris" (as songwriter)	Best Rap Song	Won	
2013	"Mercy" (as songwriter)	Best Rap Song	Nominated	
2014	"New Slaves" (as songwriter)	Best Rap Song	Nominated	
2015	"Bound 2" (as songwriter)	Best Rap Song	Nominated	
2016	"All Day" (as songwriter)	Best Rap Song	Nominated	
2016	Beauty Behind the Madness (as producer)	Album of the Year	Nominated	
2017	Lemonade (as producer)	Album of the Year	Nominated	
2017	Purpose (as producer)	Album of the Year	Nominated	
2017	"Famous" (as songwriter)	Best Rap Song	Nominated	
2017	"Ultralight Beam" (as songwriter)	Best Rap Song	Nominated	
2019	"Sicko Mode" (as songwriter)	Best Rap Song	Nominated	
2021	Jesus Is King (as engineer/mixer)	Best Contemporary Christian Music Album	Won	
2022	"Jail" (as songwriter)	Best Rap Song	Won	
2022	Donda (as producer/songwriter)	Album of the Year	Nominated	
2023	Renaissance (as producer/songwriter)	Album of the Year	Nominated	

== See also ==
- Houston hip-hop
- Kanye West
