= Tati Quebra Barraco =

Tati Quebra-Barraco
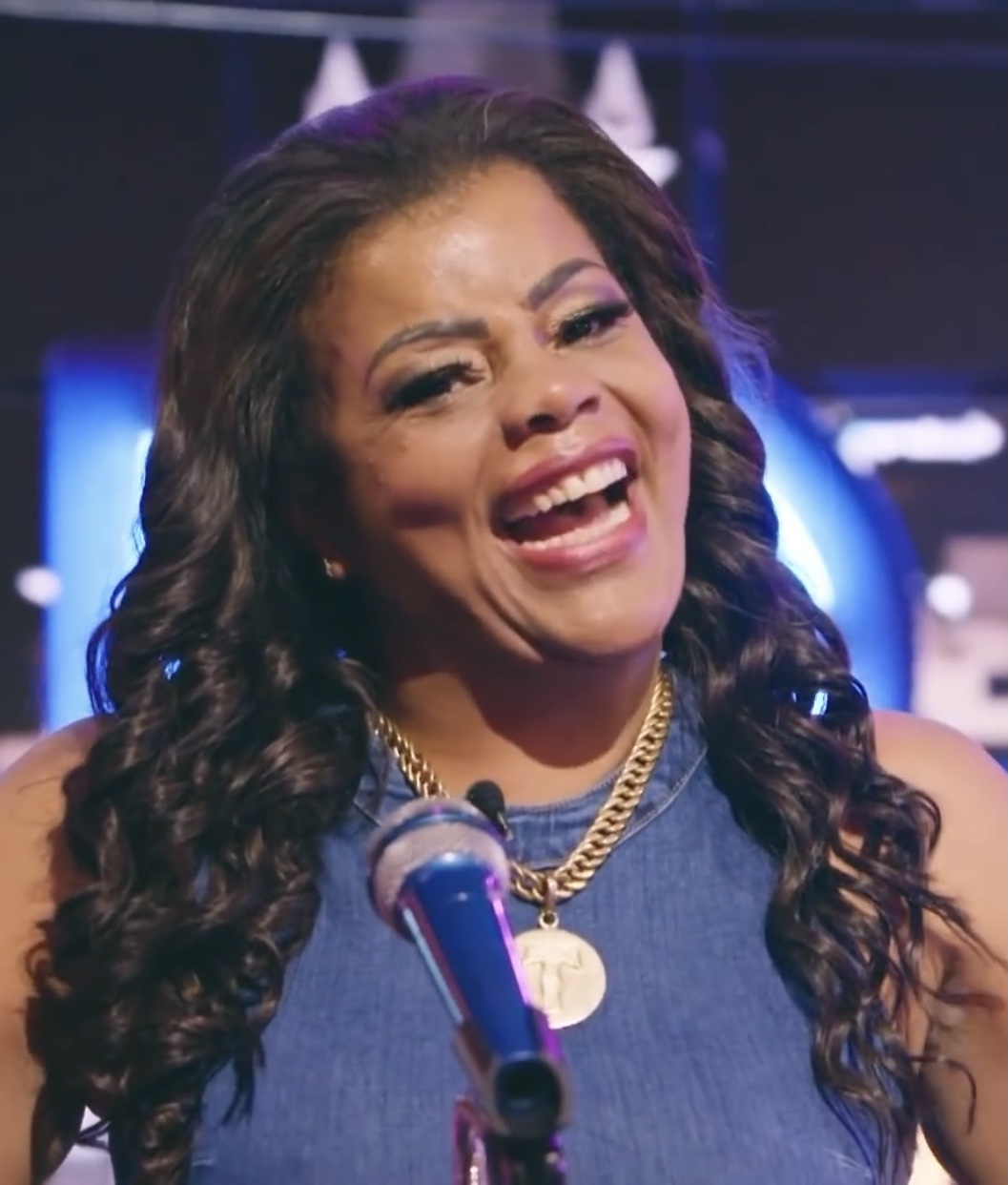
- Tati in 2021

Background information
- Also known as: Tati Quebra Barraco
- Born: Tatiana dos Santos Lourenço; September 21, 1979 (age 47); Rio de Janeiro, Brazil
- Genre: Funk carioca
- Instrument: Vocals
- Years active: 1995–present
- Labels: Outsider Records; Link Records; Galerão Records

Tatiana dos Santos Lourenço (born September 21, 1979), better known by her stage name Tati Quebra Barraco, is a Brazilian singer and songwriter. She is widely recognized as one of the pioneers and main figures in the popularization of the funk carioca genre.

== Lyrical style ==
Barraco demonstrates the prejudices surrounding Baile funk and working-class culture in Brazil in her lyrics: that many or all of the people who come from the favelas are sexually depraved drug-dealing maniacs. Even with strong sexual meanings, her lyrics nevertheless break down stereotypes, demands equality between men and women.

Her style of Baile Funk, said to originate from the favelas of Brazil, is reflected in her musical stylings and even her lyrics and name, which translates as "Tati shack-wrecker". Her most famous song to date is "Boladona" (2004), whose YouTube video has more than 7 million views.

== Career ==
She is best-known for the album Boladona. It was originally released in 2000 by Unimar Music, then reissued four years later by Link Records. Fellow rappers YURI, MC Fornalha and MC Serginho are featured. Since becoming a musician, she has become one of the genre's top earners selling millions of CDs. Barraco has been known to epitomize the working-class, Baile-funk culture of sex-crazed, "drug-dealing maniacs" and many prominent rumors have been started about her, such as her being arrested for drug possession. Despite this, Tati's fame is often has not been attached to her career in music, but from her appearance on the Brazilian soap opera América, the related media exposure, and her brazen personality.

Tati is known for her lyric "sou feia, mas tô na moda" (I'm ugly, but I'm trendy.), becoming the title for a documentary about Brazilian night life.for baile funk events.

== Personal life ==
Tati Quebra Barraco was raised in the Cidade de Deus favela located in the north zone of Rio de Janeiro. Barraco is a mother of three children and still lives in the favela.
