= Z-Ro discography =

This is the discography of Z-Ro, an American rapper from Houston, Texas.

== Albums ==
=== Studio albums ===
Title	Album details	Peak chart positions		
Title	Album details	US	US R&B	US Rap
Look What You Did to Me	Released: June 16, 1998; Label: Fisherboy; Format: CD, digital download	—	—	—
Z-Ro vs. the World	Released: June 13, 2000; Label: Straight Profit; Format: CD, digital download	—	90	—
King of da Ghetto	Released: June 26, 2001; Label: Straight Profit; Format: CD, digital download	—	—	—
Z-Ro	Released: 2001; Label: KMJ; Format: CD, digital download	—	—	—
Life	Released: 2002; Label: KMJ, Presidential; Format: CD, digital download	—	—	—
Screwed Up Click Representa	Released: 2002; Label: Presidential; Format: CD, digital download	—	58	—
Z-Ro Tolerance	Released: 2003; Label: KMJ, Presidential; Format: CD, digital download	—	57	—
The Life of Joseph W. McVey	Released: February 24, 2004; Label: Rap-A-Lot, Asylum; Format: CD, digital download	170	27	—
Let the Truth Be Told	Released: April 12, 2005; Label: Rap-A-Lot, Asylum; Format: CD, digital download	69	14	5
I'm Still Livin'	Released: November 7, 2006; Label: Rap-A-Lot, Asylum; Format: CD, digital download	75	14	7
King of tha Ghetto: Power	Released: May 8, 2007; Label: Rap-A-Lot; Format: CD, digital download	197	32	10
Crack	Released: September 16, 2008; Label: Rap-A-Lot; Format: CD, digital download	48	12	6
Cocaine	Released: October 27, 2009; Label: Rap-A-Lot; Format: CD, digital download	147	19	17
Heroin	Released: June 22, 2010; Label: Rap-A-Lot; Format: CD, digital download	142	29	15
Meth	Released: September 20, 2011; Label: Rap-A-Lot; Format: CD, digital download	90	12	10
Angel Dust	Released: October 2, 2012; Label: Rap-A-Lot; Format: CD, digital download	120	17	13
The Crown	Released: June 23, 2014; Label: Rap-A-Lot; Format: CD, digital download	—	—	—
Melting the Crown	Released: February 24, 2015; Label: One Deep; Format: CD, digital download	—	16	—
Drankin' & Drivin'	Released: July 15, 2016; Label: One Deep, Empire; Format: CD, digital download	99	7	5
Legendary	Released: November 11, 2016; Label: One Deep, Empire; Format: CD, digital download	—	15	8
No Love Boulevard	Released: June 30, 2017; Label: One Deep, Empire; Format: CD, digital download	135	46	—
Codeine	Released: December 1, 2017; Label: One Deep, Empire; Format: CD, digital download	—	41	—
Sädism	Released: November 16, 2018; Label: One Deep, Empire; Format: CD, digital download	—	24	—
Rohammad Ali	Released: June 26, 2020; Label: One Deep, Empire; Format: CD, digital download	—	—	—
Pressure	Released: May 27, 2022; Label: One Deep, Empire; Format: CD, digital download	—	—	—
The Ghetto Gospel	Released: March 29, 2024; Label: One Deep, Empire; Format: CD, digital download	—	—	—
Call Me Rother	Released: December 13, 2024; Label: One Deep, Wreckshop; Format: CD, digital download	—	—	—
Unappreciated	Released: December 19, 2025; Label: One Deep, SoSouth; Format: CD, digital download	—	—	—
Never Love a Bitch Again	Released: February 14, 2026; Label: One Deep, SoSouth; Format: CD, digital download	—	—	—
Forever King	Released: October 16, 2026; Label: One Deep, SoSouth; Format: CD, digital download	—	—	—

=== Collaborative albums ===
Title	Album details	Peak chart positions		
Title	Album details	US	US R&B	US Rap
Rise (with Guerilla Maab)	Released: 1999; Label: Resurrection; Format: CD, digital download	—	—	—
Resurrected (with Guerilla Maab)	Released: 2002; Label: KMJ; Format: CD, digital download	—	—	—
Assholes by Nature (with Trae tha Truth as ABN)	Released: 2003; Label: G-Maab; Format: CD, digital download	—	—	—
Kings of the South (with Lil' Flip)	Released: 2005; Label: Clover G, PayDay; Format: CD, digital download	—	—	—
It Is What It Is (with Trae tha Truth as ABN)	Released: July 15, 2008; Label: G-Maab, Rap-A-Lot; Format: CD, digital download	62	10	7
The Rain (with Chill)	Released: 2009; Label: Young Empire; Format: CD, digital download	—	—	—
2 Da Hardway (with Mike D)	Released: 2010; Label: Screwed Up Click; Format: CD, digital download	—	—	—
2 the Hardway (with Mike D)	Released: February 19, 2021; Label: One Deep, Straight Profit; Format: CD, digital download	—	—	—
Kingz of the South, Vol. 2 (with Lil' Flip)	Released: March 29, 2025; Label: One Deep, Clover G; Format: CD, digital download	—	—	—

=== Compilation albums ===
Title	Album details	Peak chart positions		
Title	Album details	US	US R&B	US Rap
Z-Ro vs. the World / King of the Ghetto	Released: 2002; Label: Straight Profit; Format: CD	—	—	—
For My Thugs: Greatest Hits	Released: 2004; Label: Beltway 8; Format: CD	—	—	—
Fuck 'Em All: Z-Ro's Greatest Verses Revisited & Remixed	Released: 2005; Label: N/A; Format: CD	—	—	—
Z-Ro and the S.U.C.	Released: 2006; Label: Tru Blue; Format: CD	—	—	—
4/20 the Smokers Anthem	Released: 2006; Label: KMJ; Format: CD	—	—	—
1 Deep	Released: 2006; Label: Presidential; Format: CD	—	—	—
Tha Omega	Released: 2007; Label: KMJ; Format: CD	—	66	—
Z-Ro and the S.U.C. Part 2	Released: 2008; Label: Tru Blue; Format: CD	—	—	—
Greatest Hits	Released: 2008; Label: Rap-A-Lot; Format: CD	—	72	—
T.I.M.E. (Things I Must Earn)	Released: 2011; Label: KMJ; Format: CD	—	—	—
Straight Profit	Released: 2011; Label: RBC; Format: CD	—	—	—
These Dayz	Released: 2012; Label: Trauma Unit; Format: CD	—	—	—

== Extended plays ==
Title	EP details
Tripolar	Released: 2013; Label: One Deep; Format: Digital download
S O L I D	Released: 2016; Label: One Deep; Format: Digital download
Quarantine: Social Distancing	Released: 2020; Label: One Deep, Empire; Format: Digital download

== Mixtapes ==
Title	Mixtape details
A Bad Azz Mix Tape	Released: 2003; Label: Presidential; Format: CD
Gangstafied	Released: 2003; Label: F.O.D.; Format: CD
Underground Railroad Vol. 1: Street Life (Hulled & Chopped)	Released: 2004; Label: KMJ, Presidential; Format: CD
Underground Railroad Vol. 2: Thug Luv (Hulled & Chopped)	Released: 2004; Label: KMJ; Format: CD
Z-Ro and Friends	Released: 2005; Label: KMJ; Format: CD
Underground Railroad Vol. 3: Paper Stacks (Hulled & Chopped)	Released: 2006; Label: KMJ; Format: CD
Rodeine	Released: 2009; Label: Screwed Up; Format: CD
My Favorite Mixtape	Released: 2009; Label: KMJ; Format: CD
Relvis Presley	Released: 2010; Label: One Deep; Format: CD
No Nutt No Glory	Released: 2011; Label: Tru Blue; Format: CD
The 5200 Mixtape	Released: 2011; Label: N/A; Format: CD
Mo City Playaz	Released: 2012; Label: N/A; Format: CD
The Unmixed Mixtape	Released: 2014; Label: One Deep; Format: CD

== Singles ==
=== As lead artist ===
Year	Song	Chart positions			Album
Year	Song	U.S. Hot 100	U.S. R&B	U.S. Rap	Album
2004	"I Hate You Bitch"	–	75	-	The Life of Joseph W. McVey
2005	"Platinum"	–	-	-	Let the Truth Be Told
2005	"From the South" (feat. Lil' Flip and Paul Wall)	–	-	-	Let the Truth Be Told
2006	"True Hero Under God (T.H.U.G.)"	–	-	-	I'm Still Livin'
2006	"I'm Still Livin'" (feat. Big Hawk and Trae tha Truth)	–	-	-	I'm Still Livin'
2008	"Top Notch" (feat. Pimp C)	–	62	-	Crack
2008	"Rollin"	–	-	-	Crack
2008	"Tired" (feat. Mýa)	–	-	-	Crack
2009	"One Two" (feat. Billy Cook)	–	-	-	Cocaine
2009	"I Can't Leave Drank Alone" (feat. Lil' O)	–	-	-	Cocaine
2010	"Driving Me Wild"	–	-	-	Heroin
2010	"Never (These Days)"	–	70	-	Luther Vandross Sings the Blues
2011	"Never Had Love"	–	-	-	Meth
2011	"Southern Girl" (feat. Yo Gotti)	–	-	-	Meth
2024	"HIM" (feat. CeeLo Green)	–	-	-	Call Me Rother

=== As featured artist ===
Year	Song	Chart positions			Album
Year	Song	U.S. Hot 100	U.S. R&B	U.S. Rap	Album
1999	"We da' Shit!" (Big Moe feat. E.S.G. and Z-Ro)	–	–	–	City of Syrup
1999	"City of Syrup" (Big Moe feat. Z-Ro, Tyte Eyes and DJ Screw)	–	–	–	City of Syrup
1999	"Payin' Dues" (Big Moe feat. Z-Ro)	–	–	–	City of Syrup
1999	"Po' It Up" (Big Moe feat. Big Hawk and Z-Ro)	–	–	–	City of Syrup
2006	"Get Throwed" (Bun B feat. Pimp C, Z-Ro, Young Jeezy and Jay-Z)	–	49	24	Trill
2006	"No Help" (Trae tha Truth feat. Z-Ro)	–	–	–	Restless
2010	"Gangsta" (Slim Thug feat. Z-Ro)	–	64	–	Tha Thug Show

=== Promotional singles ===
Title	Year	Peak chart positions		Album
Title	Year	US	US R&B	Album
"Draped Up (Remix)" (Bun B featuring Lil' Keke, Slim Thug, Chamillionaire, Paul Wall, Mike Jones, Aztek, Lil' Flip and Z-Ro)	2007	—	45	Trill

== Guest appearances ==
List of non-single guest appearances, with other performing artists, showing year released and album name
Title	Year	Other artist(s)	Album
"Came Along Way"	1998	—N/a	G-Rapp The General: Military Mindz
"Gorilla Maab"	1998	Trae	G-Rapp The General: Military Mindz
"Fallen Souljas (R.I.P. P.A.T.)"	1998	Wood, Jhiame	Def South Records: Southside So Real
"June 27"	1999	Yungstar, Trey-D, Black 1, Lil Flex, Den-Den, Demo, Grace, Wood, Solo-D, Lil Dave, Papa Rue, Lil Fee, Taylor Made, Ace Deuce, Lil' O, Kool Aid, PSK-13, R.W.O., South Park Mexican, Crooks, Madd Hattta	Throwed Yung Playa
"All About Gettin' Paid"	2000	Edgar Lee, Trae	Bigtyme Recordz: Volume III American Dream
"Grip On Grain"	2000	G-Low, Trae	The Last Man Standing
"Southside Groovin"	2000	Point Blank, PSK-13, Zhayne, Lil Flex, Lil Flea, South Park Mexican, Big T,	Bad Newz Travels Fast
"High With Tha Blanksta (2000)"	2000	Point Blank, Lil Flex, Black, C-Loc, Mr. 3–2, PSK-13, Big Moe	Bad Newz Travels Fast
"Hustlin All I Can Do"	2000	Point Blank, Godfather, C-Note	Bad Newz Travels Fast
"Hustlaz Across The Nation"	2000	PSK-13	Flagrant The Hustle Game Project Pt. 1
"Looking Good"	2000	Papa Reu	Xcuse Me!
"I Miss Homie"	2000	Woss Ness, DZ, Lose	Bangin Screw
"4's & 3's"	2000	Dat Boy Grace, Wood	From Crumbs To Bricks
"All About Da Green"	2000	Dat Boy Grace, Lil Flex, SlikkBreeze	From Crumbs To Bricks
"Under The Floor"	2001	—N/a	Screw Heads: Forever And A Day
"My Nigga Part 1"	2001	D-Drew, Lil Maine	Down South Still Holdin
"Ballin' Outta Control"	2001	C-Nile, Big Pokey, Lil Keke	The Golden Child
"Where My Dog's At?"	2001	C-Nile, Mr. 3–2, Jane Flame	The Golden Child
"Hero"	2001	Lil Flex, D-Black	Time 2 Play
"Playa Dont"	2001	G.I.N. of the Presidential Playas	Straight Out Da Bottle
"Boys Ain't Ready"	2001	Sic & Southern Made Playaz	The Boss Of All Bosses
"Ballin' Outta Control"	2001	C-Nile, Mr. 3–2, Jane Flame	The Golden Child
"Hold It Down"	2001	Lil' O, BFK	Da Fat Rat Wit Da Cheeze
"Ooh Wee"	2001	Lil' O	Da Fat Rat Wit Da Cheeze
"Heart Pump Tears"	2002	50 Pak	Hell Is Hot... The World Is Cold
"Get Your Paper"	2002	Al-D, Enjoli	4 Da Green
"Where I'm From (Huggin Da Block)"	2002	Big Pokey	Da Sky's Da Limit
"We Aint Trippin No Mo"	2002	E.S.G., Slim Thug	E.S.G. & Slim Thug: Boss Hogg Outlawz
"We Won't Stop"	2002	Big Moe, D-Gotti	Purple World
"Confidential Playa"	2002	Big Moe, Pymp Tyte, Ronnie Spencer	Purple World
"Tonight"	2002	Sam Huston Boyz, E.S.G.	Stay Real
"It Can't Rain 4 Ever"	2003	Lil' O, Bleeda	Food On Tha Table
"Losing Composure"	2003	Trae, Yukmouth	Losing Composure
"Same Everyday"	2003	Mussilini	Coast II Coast
"4 My Gangstas"	2003	Mussilini	Coast II Coast
"Gorilla"	2003	Lyrical 187, Den-Den	Ready 4 What Eva
"Om My Grind"	2003	Scarface	Balls & My Word
"Bitch Nigga"	2003	Scarface, Dirt Bomb, Bun B	Balls & My Word
"In A Minute"	2003	Do or Die, Navee	Pimpin' Ain't Dead
"Let Me Live"	2004	Trae, Shyna	Same Thing Different Day
"Ride On"	2004	Trae	Same Thing Different Day
"Lyrical Grind"	2004	K-Rino	The Hit List
"Comin' Up"	2005	Pimp C, Lil' Flip	Sweet James Jones Stories
"Young Ghetto Stars"	2005	Pimp C	Sweet James Jones Stories
"Draped Up" (H Town Remix)	2005	Bun B, Lil Keke, Slim Thug, Chamillionaire, Paul Wall, Mike Jones, Aztek, Lil' Flip	Trill
"Comin Up"	2005	Chamillionaire, Pimp C, Lil' Flip	Tippin' Down 2005
"U Ain't a Pimp"	2006	Lil' Flip	I'm a Balla
"Ready 4 War"	2006	Lil' C, Archie Lee, Trae, Dougie, Lil B, Jay'Ton, 3–2, Dyno	Slow, Loud and Bangin', Volume 3
"Definition of Real"	2006	Scarface, Ice Cube	My Homies Part 2
"Burn"	2007	Scarface	Made
"Won't Let You Down" (Remix)	2007	Chamillionaire, Lil Keke, Slim Thug, Mike Jones, Trae, Pimp C, Bun B, Paul Wall	Ultimate Victory
"Alone"	2007	Gator Main, The Ballplayas	Texas The Album
"Soldier Story"	2008	Scarface, The Product	Emeritus
"One Hundred"	2009	Paul Wall, Yung Redd	Fast Life
"I'm Clean"	2009	Paul Wall	Fast Life
"Smoke Everyday"	2010	Paul Wall, Devin the Dude	Heart of a Champion
"Jammin Screw"	2010	Papa Reu, Lil' O	Da Original
"I Dont Luv Her"	2010	Papa Reu, Big Hawk	Da Original
"Head Hunta"	2011	Baby Bash, Lucky Luciano	Bashtown
"Paranoid"	2011	Outlawz, Trae tha Truth, June Summers	Perfect Timing
"Rollin'"	2011	Cory Mo	It's Been About Time
"Where Have You Been"	2011	Fat Pat	Bright Lights, Big City
"Ready 4 War"	2012	50 Cent	S.L.A.B. Vol 3
"So Crazy"	2012	Young Noble, B-Legit	Outlaw Rydahz Vol. 1
"Know About Me"	2012	Young Noble, EDIDON	Outlaw Rydahz Vol. 1
"Smoke Sumthen"	2012	Yukmouth, K.B.	Half Baked
"Bitch I'm From Texas"	2012	Trae tha Truth, Paul Wall, Slim Thug, Kirko Bangz Bun B	Tha Blackprint
"My Time"	2012	Kirko Bangz	Procrastination Kills 4
"Do It Again"	2012	Lil Keke	Heart of a Hustla
"Rollin'"	2012	Game, Kanye West, Trae tha Truth, Slim Thug, Paul Wall	—N/a
"Here We Go"	2013	Hurricane Chris	Caniac
"I Been On" (Remix)	2013	Beyoncé, Bun B, Scarface, Willie D, Slim Thug, Lil Keke	—N/a
"Slab"	2013	Funkmaster Flex, Kirko Bangz	Who You Mad At? Me or Yourself?
"Pac and Pimp (RIP)"	2013	EDIDON, Tony Atlanta	O.G. Est. 1992
"Real Niggas Back"	2013	Dorrough	Shut The City Down
"Cup Up Top Down"	2013	Kirko Bangz, Paul Wall, Slim Thug	Progression III
"Go Long"	2013	Nipsey Hussle, Slim Thug	Crenshaw
"The Legendary DJ Screw"	2013	Bun B, ESG, C-Note, Lil' O, Trae tha Truth, Big Hawk	Trill OG: The Epilogue
"In Dat Cup"	2013	E-40, Big K.R.I.T.	The Block Brochure: Welcome to the Soil 5
"Blessing In Disguise"	2014	Rick Ross, Scarface	Mastermind
"H-Town Anthem"	2014	Point Blank, Lil Keke, Avery	No Money, No Reason
"Summer In Houston"	2014	Point Blank, Bun B, Klondike Kat	No Money, No Reason

== Music videos ==
Year	Title	Album
2002	"Nothin Left 2 Live " Guerilla Maab ( Trae, Z-Ro & Dougie D)	Resurrected
2004	"Let Me Live My Life" (Trae feat. Z-Ro & Shyna	Same Thing Different Day
2004	"I Hate You"	The Life of Joseph W. McVey
	"Lookin' Good" Z-Ro feat. Papa Reu (Directed by REL)	Z-Ro vs. the World
2005	"Draped Up" (Remix) (Bun B feat. Lil Keke, Slim Thug, Chamillionaire, Paul Wall, Mike Jones, Aztek, Lil Flip & Z-Ro)	Trill
2006	"Get Throwed" (Bun B feat. Pimp C, Z-Ro & Young Jeezy)	Trill
2006	"No Help" (Trae feat. Z-Ro)	Restless
2009	"Top Notch"	Crack
2009	"Tired" (feat. Mýa)	Crack
2009	"I Can't Leave Drank Alone" (feat. Lil' O)	Cocaine
2010	"Driving Me Wild"	Heroin
2011	"Rollin" (Cory Mo feat Z-Ro)	Its Been About Time
2012	"I'm from Texas" (Trae tha Truth feat Z-Ro, Slim Thug, Paul Wall, Bun B & Kirko Bangz	Tha Blackprint
