= Willie D discography =

- Studio albums: 5
- Compilation albums: 1
- Singles: 2

This is the discography of American rapper Willie D.

== Studio albums ==
Title	Release	Peak chart positions	
Title	Release	US	US R&B
Controversy	Released: December 21, 1989; Label: Rap-A-Lot	—	53
I'm Goin' Out Lika Soldier	Released: September 15, 1992; Label: Rap-A-Lot	88	27
Play Witcha Mama	Released: October 25, 1994; Label: Wrap / Ichiban	—	31
Loved by Few, Hated by Many	Released: October 24, 2000; Label: Rap-A-Lot	124	25
Unbreakable	Released: February 11, 2003; Label: Relentless	—	—
"—" denotes a recording that did not chart.

== Compilation albums ==
- Relentless (2001)

== Charting singles ==
Title	Release	Peak chart positions		Album
Title	Release	US R&B	US Rap	Album
"Clean Up Man"	1992	51	6	I'm Goin' Out Lika Soldier
"Dear God"	2002	78	4	Loved by Few, Hated by Many
