= Forever Botany =

Studio album by Botany Boyz
- Released: February 15, 2000
- Studio: Top Notch Studio (Houston, TX)
- Genre: Hip-hop
- Length: 1:10:08
- Label: Big Shot
- Producer: C-Note (exec.); D-Red; J.P. Nitty; James Hoover; Jhiame; Willo

Botany Boyz chronology
Thought of Many Ways (1997)	Forever Botany (2000)

Professional ratings
Review scores
Source	Rating
AllMusic	3/5 stars

Forever Botany is the second and final studio album by American hip-hop group Botany Boyz. It was released on February 15, 2000 through Big Shot Records. Recorded at Top Notch Studio in Texas, it was produced by D-Red, Jhiame, Willo, James Hoover and J.P. Nitty. It features guest appearances from Hustlaz $tackin' Endz, Big T, Billy Cook, Blade King, Botany B.G.'s, Bun B, Jolivette, Lil' Real, South Park Mexican and Vic. The album is dedicated to Danta "B.G. Gator" Smith, a fellow American rapper and member of the duo Botany B.G.'s who died in May 1999.

The album debuted at number 99 on the Top R&B/Hip-Hop Albums and number 42 on the Independent Albums charts in the United States.

== Track listing ==
No.	Title	Producer(s)	Length
1.	"Botany St. Intro" (featuring Blade King and DJ Screw)		1:46
2.	"Sittin' on Top of the World" (featuring Lil' Real)	Willo	4:00
3.	"Block Dat Stay Crunk"	Jhiame	4:08
4.	"We Throwed" (featuring H.$.E.)	James Hoover	3:16
5.	"Drop It in Tha Sunny" (featuring Vic)	James Hoover	3:45
6.	"My Piece Shine Brite" (featuring Lil' Flip)	Willo	4:17
7.	"Partnaz on Botany" (featuring Big T)	Jhiame	3:22
8.	"Kokane Kowboy"		3:54
9.	"We Miss U Gator" (featuring Botany B.G.'s)	Jhiame	5:12
10.	"Cloverland 2000"	D-Red	4:25
11.	"Money-In-My-Life"	Willo	3:22
12.	"Represent'n (Skit)"		0:30
13.	"Here They Come!!" (featuring Bun B)	J.P. Nitty	5:12
14.	"Imagine Dat"	D-Red	3:35
15.	"Com'n Down Wreckin, Pt. 2"	D-Red	4:20
16.	"Call'n Yo Name" (featuring S.P.M.)		5:16
17.	"As You Can See (Southside)"	D-Red	5:21
18.	"Forever Botany" (featuring Billy Cook and Jolivette)	Jhiame	4:27
Total length:			1:10:08

== Charts ==
Chart (2000)	Peak position
US Top R&B/Hip-Hop Albums (Billboard)	99
US Independent Albums (Billboard)	42
