= Choice (rapper) =

American rapper

- Born: Houston, Texas, United States
- Genres: Hip Hop
- Occupation: Rapper
- Years active: 1983–present
- Label: Rap-A-Lot

Kim Davis, better known by her stage name of Choice or MC Choice, is an American female rapper based out of Houston, Texas. She is best known for her album The Big Payback, which first came out in 1990. Signed to the label Rap-A-Lot Records, her strident, sexually explicit album prefigured the image and sound of later female rappers such as Lil' Kim, with music journalist Roni Sarig mentioning Choice in Third Coast: Outkast, Timbaland, and How Hip-Hop Became a Southern Thing as one of the U.S. south's underground kings and queens of rap alongside the Geto Boys and Street Military.

She first appeared on Willie D's 1989 album Controversy (with him then known as "Willie Dee"). The release ended up peaking at #53 on the U.S. R&B Albums chart. Ironically, Choice would soon criticize Willie D in a diss track also aimed at various male MCs of the time (such as Ice Cube).

Choice belongs to a more "sex"-based lyrical school of hard-core female rappers as opposed to those with a more "gangsta" sound. Artists in this subgenre espouse female-in-charge sexuality in their lyrics, often mixing being assertive in what they want while also mocking the exaggerated sexual boasts of male rappers through put-downs. Specific song examples of Choice's strident image include the oral sex-themed track "Cat Got Your Tongue".

== Discography ==
=== Studio albums ===
- The Big Payback (1990) U.S. R&B #46
- Stick-N-Moove (1992) U.S. R&B #83

=== Guest appearances ===
Title	Release	Other artist(s)	Album
"I Need Some Pussy"	1989	Willie D	Controversy

== See also ==
- Southern hip-hop
