= Play Witcha Mama =

Studio album by Willie D
- Released: October 25, 1994
- Recorded: 1993–1994
- Studio: Ultimate Sound Studio (Houston, TX); Street Knowledge Productions (Los Angeles, CA)
- Genre: Hip-hop
- Label: Wize Up; Wrap
- Producer: Crazy C; Derek "Grizz" Edwards; Willie D

Willie D chronology
I'm Goin' Out Lika Soldier (1992)	Play Witcha Mama (1994)	Loved by Few, Hated by Many (2000)

Singles from Play Witcha Mama
- 1. "Play Witcha Mama" Released: 1994; 2. "Is It Real (My Mind Still Playin' Tricks On Me)" Released: January 24, 1995; 3. "Creepin'" Released: June 13, 1995

Professional ratings
Review scores
Source	Rating
AllMusic	3.5/5 stars

Play Witcha Mama is the third solo album by American rapper Willie D. It was released on October 25, 1994, through Wize Up/Wrap Records with distribution via Ichiban Records. Recording sessions took place at Ultimate Sounds Studio in Houston and Street Knowledge Productions in Los Angeles. Production was handled by Derek "Grizz" Edwards, Crazy C, and Willie D himself, who also served as executive producer. It features guest appearances from Sho, Rasir X, The Lost Boys, Ice Cube and Lez Moné. The album was supported with three singles: "Play Witcha Mama", "Is It Real (My Mind Still Playin' Tricks on Me)" and "Creepin'".

The album turned out to be a commercial failure, reaching only number 31 on the US Billboard Top R&B/Hip-Hop Albums chart. The rapper returned to the Geto Boys to work on the group's next album, The Resurrection, which was released in 1996.

The album's cut "Guess My Religion" was covered by Insane Clown Posse for their 2012 cover album Smothered, Covered & Chunked.

== Track listing ==
No.	Title	Producer(s)	Length
1.	"Recipe 4 a Murder" (featuring Sho)	Derek "Grizz" Edwards
2.	"Is It Real (My Mind Still Playin' Tricks on Me)"	Crazy C; Willie D (co.)
3.	"Play Witcha Mama" (featuring Ice Cube)	Derek "Grizz" Edwards; Willie D (co.)
4.	"Rap Rehab"
5.	"Creepin'" (featuring Sho)	Derek "Grizz" Edwards; Willie D (co.)
6.	"They Laphin' Atcha"	Crazy C
7.	"Throat" (featuring Sho and Rasir X)	Derek "Grizz" Edwards; Willie D (co.)
8.	"Somethin' Good"	Crazy C
9.	"Guess My Religion"	Willie D
10.	"Whatcha Know About That" (featuring Sho)	Derek "Grizz" Edwards
11.	"Doin the Nasty"
12.	"I Wanna Fuck Your Mama"	Derek "Grizz" Edwards
13.	"Smoke'm" (featuring The Lost Boys and Sho)	Derek "Grizz" Edwards
14.	"Niggas Are Dyin'"	Crazy C; Willie D (co.)
15.	"U Got Homeboys, We Got Homeboys" (featuring The Lost Boys, Sho and Rasir X)	Derek "Grizz" Edwards
16.	"Ain't Changin' Shit" (featuring Lez Moné)	Derek "Grizz" Edwards; Willie D (co.)

Sample credits

- Track 3 contains portions of "Supernatural Thing" by Ben E. King.

== Personnel ==
- William "Willie D." Dennis – vocals, producer (track 9), co-producer (tracks: 2, 3, 5, 7, 14, 16), executive producer, art direction
- Sho – vocals (tracks: 1, 5, 7, 10, 13, 15)
- O'Shea "Ice Cube" Jackson – vocals (track 3)
- Rasir X – vocals (tracks: 7, 15)
- The Lost Boys – vocals (tracks: 13, 15)
- Leslie "Lez Moné" Hall – vocals (track 16)
- Melanie McGee – background vocals (tracks: 2, 10)
- Gerome Hulett – background vocals (track 7)
- Corey "Funky Fingaz" Stoot – lead guitar
- Dirtt – bass guitar
- Terrence "Bearwolf" Williams – keyboards
- Derek "Grizz" Edwards – keyboards, producer (tracks: 1, 3, 5, 7, 10, 12, 13, 15, 16)
- Simon "Crazy C" Cullins – keyboards, producer (tracks: 2, 6, 8, 14)
- Maestro – recording engineer
- Craig G – recording engineer
- James Hoover – mixing engineer
- Chris Gehringer – mastering
- Clyde Bazile Jr. – art direction
- Alejandro Torres – photography

== Charts ==
Chart (1994)	Peak position
US Top R&B/Hip-Hop Albums (Billboard)	31
