= Legendary (Z-Ro album) =

Studio album by Z-Ro
- Released: November 11, 2016
- Recorded: 2016
- Genre: Hip hop
- Length: 1:05:59
- Label: 1 Deep Entertainment; EMPIRE

Z-Ro chronology
Drankin' & Drivin' (2016)	Legendary (2016)	No Love Boulevard (2017)

Legendary is the twentieth studio album by American rapper Z-Ro, released on November 11, 2016 under 1 Deep Entertainment and was distributed by EMPIRE. The album features guest appearances from Mike D and Just Brittany.

== Track listing ==
No.	Title	Producer	Length
1.	"Never Wrote"	Synesthetic Nation	3:52
2.	"Og"	G&B	4:29
3.	"Drank & Smoke"	Synesthetic Nation, Nat Powers	4:02
4.	"My Time"	Synesthetic Nation	4:03
5.	"I Know"	G&B	3:30
6.	"Ain't No Love"	Beanz & Kornbread	4:10
7.	"I Can" (featuring Mike D)	Synesthetic Nation	4:23
8.	"Skrewed Up"	Synesthetic Nation	5:10
9.	"I'm Good"	Synesthetic Nation	4:11
10.	"It's Ok" (featuring Just Brittany)	Beanz & Kornbread	3:36
11.	"One Deep 4 Life"	Synesthetic Nation	5:39
12.	"Out His Mind"	Synesthetic Nation	4:57
13.	"Thru the City"	G&B	5:13
14.	"Dome, Kush, And Codeine"	Jonathan Zibi; Bruce Bang	3:53
15.	"Come With Me"	Mike Dean	4:51
Total length:			01:05:59

Notes

- All songs mixed by James Hoover at Hoover Sound Studio
- All songs mastered by James Hoover at Hoover Sound Studio
- Pressed By Disc Makers
- Management by Darryl Gooden

== Charts ==
Chart	Peak position
US Independent Albums	20
US Top R&B/Hip-Hop Albums (Billboard)	15
