= Melting the Crown =

Studio album by Z-Ro
- Released: February 24, 2015
- Recorded: 2014–15
- Studio: The Cold Chamber Studios (Houston, TX); Hoover Sound Studio (Houston, TX)
- Genre: Hip hop
- Length: 59:58
- Label: One Deep Entertainment; J. Prince Entertainment
- Producer: Jonathan Zibi; Beanz N Kornbread; Sean "Solo" Jemison; Bass Heavy; Cory Mo; Flaco The Great; Mr. Lee

Z-Ro chronology
The Crown (2014)	Melting the Crown (2015)	Drankin' & Drivin' (2016)

Professional ratings
Review scores
Source	Rating
RapReviews	7/10

Melting the Crown is the eighteenth studio album by American rapper Z-Ro. It was released on February 24, 2015, through One Deep Entertainment and J. Prince Entertainment. Recording sessions took place at The Cold Chamber Studios and at Hoover Sound Studio in Houston. The album features guest appearances from Kirko Bangz, Lil' Keke, Mike D and Rick Ross.

== Track listing ==
No.	Title	Producer(s)	Length
1.	"Intro"	Jonathan Zibi	3:43
2.	"Don't Stop Now"	Beanz & Kornbread	5:11
3.	"Keep It Real" (featuring Rick Ross)	Jonathan Zibi	4:18
4.	"Talking to the Popo"	Sean "Solo" Jemison	3:01
5.	"The Real Is Back"	Bass Heavy	3:58
6.	"See Me Now"	Jonathan Zibi	4:42
7.	"Too Many Niggaz" (featuring Lil' Keke)	Sean "Solo" Jemison	4:20
8.	"Sweet James"	Flaco The Great	3:56
9.	"Miss My Mama" (featuring Mike D)	Jonathan Zibi	6:22
10.	"Way 2 Fly"	Cory Mo	3:31
11.	"Look Good"	Beanz & Kornbread	4:58
12.	"Porcupine" (featuring Kirko Bangz)	Beanz & Kornbread	4:00
13.	"I'm Alive"	Jonathan Zibi	3:28
14.	"Where My Money At"	Mr. Lee	4:30
Total length:			59:58

== Personnel ==
- Joseph Wayne McVey IV – primary artist
- William Leonard Roberts II – featured artist (track 2)
- Marcus Lakee Edwards – featured artist (track 7)
- Michael Dixon – featured artist (track 9)
- Kirk Jerel Randle – featured artist (track 12)
- Mickaël Zibi – additional vocals (track 13), mixing (tracks: 1–6, 8–9, 11–14), recording (tracks: 1, 3–6, 9, 11–13), artwork, design, photography
- Jonathan Zibi – guitar (track 5), producer (tracks: 1, 3, 6, 9, 13)
- Donald Johnson Jr. – producer (tracks: 2, 11, 12)
- Kenneth Roy – producer (tracks: 2, 11, 12)
- Sean Jemison – producer (tracks: 4, 7)
- Roderick Tillman – producer (track 5)
- Flaco The Great – producer (track 8)
- Cory Moore – producer & mixing (track 10)
- Leroy Williams Jr. – producer (track 14)
- James Hoover – mixing (track 7), recording (tracks: 2, 7)
- Nick Rush – mastering

== Charts ==
Chart (2015)	Peak position
US Top R&B/Hip-Hop Albums (Billboard)	16
US Top Rap Albums (Billboard)	9
US Independent Albums (Billboard)	20
