= Z-Ro =

American rapper (born 1977)

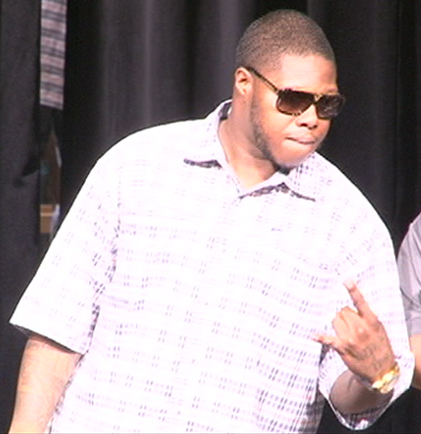
- Z-Ro in 2011

Background information
- Also known as: The Mo City Don
- Born: Joseph Wayne McVey; January 19, 1977 (age 49); Houston, Texas, U.S.
- Origin: Missouri City, Texas, U.S.
- Genre: Southern hip hop
- Occupations: Rapper; songwriter; record producer
- Years active: 1994–present
- Labels: 1Deep; J Prince; Rap-a-Lot; Asylum; KMJ; Presidential; Straight Profit; Fisherboy; S.U.C. (Screwed Up Click); Empire

Joseph Wayne McVey (born January 19, 1977), better known by his stage names Z-Ro and the Mo City Don, is an American rapper from Houston, Texas. He was named one of America's most underrated rappers by The New York Times in 2007.

== Early life ==
Z-Ro was born Joseph Wayne McVey in Houston's South Park neighborhood on January 19, 1977. When he was six, his mother died, and he was shuttled from household to household in search of stability, eventually settling in the Ridgemont area, a middle-class neighborhood in Southwest Houston near the suburb of Missouri City. When Z-Ro reached his late teens he was unemployed and resorted to drug dealing and hustling on the streets. According to Z-Ro, listening to the music of 2Pac, Geto Boys, Bone Thugs-N-Harmony, Street Military, K-Rino and Klondike Kat inspired him to work harder for his goal of leaving the streets. Z-Ro discovered his talent of freestyle rapping and after going through a couple of recording studios to make a demo, the CEO of a local label discovered and signed him.

== Career ==
Z-Ro released his critically acclaimed Rap-a-Lot debut titled The Life of Joseph W. McVey. The record was a huge success and helped expand Z-Ro's fan base beyond the South. In 2005, Z-Ro released Let the Truth Be Told, which was well received. Z-Ro's 2006 album I'm Still Livin' was released while he was imprisoned for drug possession, to positive reviews. It was called "a great album... powerful" but "relentlessly bleak" by The Village Voice and "one of the best rap albums to come out of Houston" by the Houston Chronicle. In 2010 he released the album titled Heroin, which was followed by an album titled Meth in 2011 and then Angel Dust in 2012.

Z-Ro released his first EP under The Mo City Don titled Tripolar on August 25, 2013, via One Deep Ent. Z-Ro then followed up with The Crown in June 2014. In February 2015, Z-Ro released his first proper studio album in three years, titled Melting the Crown.

In 2016, Z-Ro released Drankin & Drivin in August and Legendary in November under his label One Deep Entertainment.

In 2017, Z-Ro announced he was retiring and released No Love Boulevard in June as his final album. He came out of retirement 6 months later and released Codeine in December.

In 2018, Z-Ro released Sadism on November 16 under One Deep Entertainment and was distributed by Empire.

In 2020, Z-Ro released an EP titled Quarantine, The Social Distancing EP with appearances from rapper Boosie Badazz, Slim Thug, Lanlawd and late rapper Wicket Cricket. He then later released an album titled Rohammad Ali on June 26.

In 2021, Z-Ro along with S.U.C. rapper Mike D released a collaboration album titled 2 The Hardway with appearances from Slim Thug, Lil' Keke, Beanz from the production duo, Beanz N Kornbread, Klondike Kat, Grace from Grace Boys, Duke Gutta, Oticia Redmond, C-Note, Big Pokey, and Lil' O.

In 2022, in a statement to XXL, Z-Ro claims Trae Tha Truth asked to talk to him outside of a Houston restaurant before he allegedly sucker punched him. After that, several men jumped in and continued to assault him.

== Legal case ==
On July 26, 2017, Z-Ro was arrested after his ex-girlfriend, Just Brittany, accused him of beating her three months earlier. Z-Ro told the media that Brittany was using this accusation to get more publicity for herself as she is also appearing in a reality show on television. On October 10, a grand jury dropped the felony charges. The next day, the Harris County, Texas, district attorney filed misdemeanor charges against Z-Ro on the same alleged incident. The case was later dismissed in January 2019 after Z-Ro completed a batterer intervention program.

== Discography ==
Studio albums

- Look What You Did to Me (1998)
- Z-Ro vs. the World (2000)
- King of da Ghetto (2001)
- Z-Ro (2001)
- Life (2002)
- Screwed Up Click Representa (2002)
- Z-Ro Tolerance (2003)
- The Life of Joseph W. McVey (2004)
- Let the Truth Be Told (2005)
- I'm Still Livin' (2006)
- King of tha Ghetto: Power (2007)
- Crack (2008)
- Cocaine (2009)
- Heroin (2010)
- Meth (2011)
- Angel Dust (2012)
- The Crown (2014)
- Melting the Crown (2015)
- Drankin' & Drivin' (2016)
- Legendary (2016)
- No Love Boulevard (2017)
- Codeine (2017)
- Sädism (2018)
- Rohammad Ali (2020)
- Pressure (2022)
- The Ghetto Gospel (2024)
- Call Me Rother (2024)
- Unappreciated (2025)
- Never Love a Bitch Again (2026)
- Forever King (2026)
