= Meth (album) =

Studio album by Z-Ro
- Released: September 20, 2011
- Studio: The Cold Chamber (Tomball, TX); King Of The Ghetto Studio (Houston, TX)
- Genre: Southern hip-hop
- Length: 56:52
- Label: Rap-A-Lot 4 Life
- Producer: Beanz 'N Kornbread; Big E; Bigg Tyme; Curt McGurt; Da Honorable C.N.O.T.E.; Z-Ro

Z-Ro chronology
Heroin (2010)	Meth (2011)	Angel Dust (2012)

Professional ratings
Review scores
Source	Rating
HipHopDX	3/5
RapReviews	8/10

Meth is the fifteenth solo studio album by American rapper Z-Ro. It was released on September 20, 2011 through Rap-A-Lot 4 Life, serving as the fourth entry in Z-Ro's "drug series". Recording sessions took place at the Cold Chamber in Tomball and at King of the Ghetto Studio in Houston. Production was handled by Beanz & Kornbread, Big E, Bigg Tyme, Curt McGurt, Honorable C.N.O.T.E. and Z-Ro himself. It features guest appearances from Bun B, Dallas Blocker, Just Brittany, Slim Thug, Willie D and Yo Gotti.

In the United States, the album debuted at number 90 on the Billboard 200, number 12 on the Top R&B/Hip-Hop Albums, number 10 on the Top Rap Albums and number 14 on the Independent Albums charts.

== Track listing ==
No.	Title	Writer(s)	Producer(s)	Length
1.	"Real or Fake"	Joseph McVey; Carlton Mays	Da Honorable C.N.O.T.E.	3:58
2.	"Ro & Bun" (featuring Bun B)	McVey; Bernard Freeman; Randy Jefferson	Bigg Tyme	4:10
3.	"Never Had Love"	McVey; Donald Johnson; Kenneth Roy	Beanz-N-Kornbread	4:03
4.	"H-Town Kinda Day" (featuring Slim Thug)	McVey; Stayve Thomas; Johnson; Roy	Beanz-N-Kornbread	4:18
5.	"A Southern Girl" (featuring Yo Gotti)	McVey; Mario Mims; Johnson; Roy	Beanz-N-Kornbread	3:36
6.	"Pig Feet" (featuring Dallas Blocker)	McVey; Nathan Blocker; Johnson; Roy	Beanz-N-Kornbread	4:06
7.	"3 Way Relationship"	McVey; Elimu Tabasuri	Big E	4:23
8.	"Happy Alone"	McVey; Johnson; Roy	Beanz-N-Kornbread	5:06
9.	"Murderer" (featuring Just Brittany)	McVey; Jefferson; Joshua Moore	Bigg Tyme; Josh Moore (add.)	3:10
10.	"Razor Blade"	McVey; Johnson; Roy	Beanz-N-Kornbread	4:02
11.	"No Reason"	McVey; Curtis Lindley	Curt McGurt	3:48
12.	"When We Ride"	McVey; Johnson; Roy	Beanz-N-Kornbread	3:51
13.	"On Mo Time" (featuring Willie D.)	McVey; Willie Dennis; Tabasuri	Big E	4:22
14.	"That Mo"	McVey	Z-Ro	3:59
Total length:				56:52

Sample credits

- Track 2 contains an interpolation of "Sho Nuff" written by Winston Rogers, Marlon Goodwin, Premro Smith and Phalon Alexander and performed by Tela.

== Personnel ==
- Joseph "Z-Ro" McVey — vocals, producer (track 14), executive producer
- Bernard "Bun B" Freeman — vocals (track 2)
- Stayve "Slim Thug" Thomas — vocals (track 4)
- Mario "Yo Gotti" Mims — vocals (track 5)
- Nathan "Dallas" Blocker — vocals (track 6)
- Just Brittany — vocals (track 9)
- William "Willie D." Dennis — vocals (track 13)
- Marco Ramirez — lead guitar (track 7)
- Jeffery Lewis — bass (tracks: 7, 13)
- Carlton "Honorable C.N.O.T.E." Mays, Jr. — producer (track 1)
- Randy "Bigg Tyme" Jefferson — producer (tracks: 2, 9), engineering
- Donald "DJ" Johnson, Jr. — producer (tracks: 3–6, 8, 10, 12)
- Kenneth Roy — producer (tracks: 3–6, 8, 10, 12)
- Elimu "Big E" Tabasuri — producer (tracks: 7, 13)
- Curtis "Curt McGurt" Lindley — producer (track 11)
- Joshua Moore — co-producer (track 9), mastering
- Mickaël Zibi — engineering
- Marq Moody — mixing
- James "J. Prince" Smith — executive producer
- Brandon Holley — photography
- Tony Randle — A&R
- Anzel Jennings — A&R
- Travis Farris — A&R

== Charts ==
Chart (2011)	Peak position
US Billboard 200	90
US Top R&B/Hip-Hop Albums (Billboard)	12
US Top Rap Albums (Billboard)	10
US Independent Albums (Billboard)	14
