= The Life of Joseph W. McVey =

Studio album by Z-Ro
- Released: February 24, 2004
- Recorded: 2003–04
- Studios: Dean's List House of Hits (New York, NY); Noddfactor Studios Denton, TX); M.A.D. Studios (Houston, TX)
- Genres: Southern hip hop; gangsta rap
- Length: 59:40
- Labels: Rap-A-Lot 4 Life; J. Prince; Asylum
- Producers: Mike Dean; Mr. Lee; Sean "Solo" Jemison; Bigg Tyme; Tone Capone

Z-Ro chronology
Z-Ro Tolerance (2003)	The Life of Joseph W. McVey (2004)	Let the Truth Be Told (2005)

Singles from The Life of Joseph W. McVey
- 1. "I Hate U Bitch" Released: 2003

Professional ratings
Review scores
Source	Rating
RapReviews	7/10

The Life of Joseph W. McVey is the eighth studio album by American rapper Z-Ro. It was released on February 24, 2004, through Rap-A-Lot 4 Life/J. Prince Entertainment with distribution via Asylum Records. Recording sessions took place at Dean's List House of Hits in New York City, at Noddfactor Studios in Denton, and at M.A.D. Studios in Houston. Production was handled by Mike Dean, Mr. Lee, Bigg Tyme, Sean "Solo" Jemison and Tone Capone. The album features guest appearances from Trae tha Truth, Scarface and Tanya Herron. It peaked at number 170 on the Billboard 200 in the United States.

The track "I Hate U Bitch" was released as a single and reached number 75 on the Billboard Hot R&B/Hip-Hop Songs chart.

== Track listing ==
No.	Title	Writer(s)	Producer(s)	Length
1.	"On My Grind"	J. McVey; L. Williams	Mr. Lee	1:39
2.	"Z-Ro"	J. McVey; M. Dean; A. Gilmour	Mike Dean; Tone Capone	3:07
3.	"These Niggaz" (featuring Scarface)	J. McVey; B. Jordan; L. Williams	Mr. Lee	4:00
4.	"King of the Ghetto"	J. McVey; M. Dean	Mike Dean	4:32
5.	"II Many Niggaz"	J. McVey; S. Jemison	Sean "Solo" Jemison	4:16
6.	"I Hate U Bitch"	J. McVey; M. Dean	Mike Dean	4:32
7.	"Hey Lil Mama"	J. McVey; M. Dean	Mike Dean	4:16
8.	"So Much"	J. McVey; M. Dean	Mike Dean	3:50
9.	"That'z Who I Am" (featuring Trae)	J. McVey; M. Dean; L. Williams	Mike Dean; Mr. Lee	3:52
10.	"Everyday" (featuring Trae)	J. McVey; L. Williams	Mr. Lee	3:22
11.	"Crooked Officer"	J. McVey; M. Dean	Mike Dean	3:34
12.	"Why?" (featuring Tanya Herron)	J. McVey; M. Dean	Mike Dean	4:02
13.	"Happy Feelingz"	J. McVey; R. Jefferson	Bigg Tyme	3:43
14.	"Z-Ro" (Screwed)	J. McVey	OG Ron "C"	5:35
15.	"II Many Niggaz" (Screwed)	J. McVey; M. Dean; S. Jemison	Mike Dean; Sean "Solo" Jemison; OG Ron "C"	5:13
Total length:				59:33

== Charts ==
Chart (2004)	Peak position
US Billboard 200	170
US Top R&B/Hip-Hop Albums (Billboard)	27
US Heatseekers Albums (Billboard)	6
