= Angel Dust (Z-Ro album) =

Studio album by Z-Ro
- Released: October 2, 2012
- Studios: King Of The Ghetto Studio (Houston, TX)
- Genre: Hip-hop
- Length: 57:51
- Label: Rap-A-Lot 4 Life
- Producers: Beanz 'N Kornbread; Big E; Mr. Inkredible; Vman Productions; Z-Ro

Z-Ro chronology
Meth (2011)	Angel Dust (2012)	The Crown (2014)

Professional ratings
Review scores
Source	Rating
AllMusic	3/5 stars

Angel Dust is the sixteenth solo studio album by American rapper Z-Ro. It was released on October 2, 2012, via Rap-A-Lot 4 Life, serving as the fifth entry in Z-Ro's "drug series". Recording sessions took place at King Of The Ghetto Studio in Houston. Production was handled by Vman Productions, Beanz & Kornbread, Big E, Mr. Inkredible and Z-Ro himself. It features guest appearances from B.G., K-Rino, Lil' Flea, Lil' Flip, Mike D and Mr. Mac T.

In the United States, the album debuted at number 120 on the Billboard 200 and number 17 on the Top R&B/Hip-Hop Albums charts, with 3,700 copies sold in its first week.

== Track listing ==
No.	Title	Writer(s)	Producer(s)	Length
1.	"Never Been"	Joseph McVey; Corey Valach	Vman Productions	4:49
2.	"These Days"	McVey; Donald Johnson; Kenneth Roy	Beanz-N-Kornbread	3:39
3.	"I Just Wanna Say"	McVey; Valach	Vman Productions	3:38
4.	"Truth Is"	McVey	Z-Ro	4:12
5.	"DiccOnU" (featuring B.G. and Mr. Mac T)	McVey; Christopher Dorsey; Elimu Tabasuri	Big E	4:20
6.	"Love It" (featuring Lil' Flea)	McVey	Z-Ro	4:22
7.	"Phuq wit Me"	McVey	Z-Ro	3:37
8.	"Young Nigga"	McVey	Z-Ro	4:29
9.	"Time"	McVey; Valach	Vman Productions	4:20
10.	"Heaven"	McVey; Daniel Marquez; Brian Tistog	Mr. Inkredible	3:13
11.	"Jaccers Wanna Know" (featuring Mike D)	McVey	Z-Ro	4:09
12.	"Take My Time" (featuring Lil' Flip)	McVey; Wesley Weston	Z-Ro	4:23
13.	"When I Get Free"	McVey	Z-Ro	4:15
14.	"Today" (featuring K-Rino)	McVey; Eric Kaiser	Z-Ro	4:25
Total length:				57:51

== Personnel ==
- Joseph "Z-Ro" McVey — vocals, producer (tracks: 4, 6–8, 11–14)
- Christopher "B.G." Dorsey — vocals (track 5)
- Mr. Mac T — vocals (track 5)
- Derrick "Lil' Flea" Franklin — vocals (track 6)
- Michael "Mike D." Dixon — vocals (track 11)
- Wesley "Lil' Flip" Weston — vocals (track 12)
- Eric "K-Rino" Kaiser — vocals (track 14)
- Ian Buchannan — guitar (tracks: 3, 9)
- Jeffrey Lewis — bass (track 5)
- Daniel Marquez — guitar (track 10)
- Corey "Vman Productions" Valach — producer (tracks: 1, 3, 9)
- Donald "DJ" Johnson — producer (track 2)
- Kenneth Roy — producer (track 2)
- Elimu "Big E" Tabasuri — producer (track 5)
- Brian "Mr. Inkredible" Tistog — producer (track 10)
- Joshua Moore — mixing, mastering
- James "J. Prince" Smith — executive producer

== Chart history ==
Chart (2012)	Peak position
US Billboard 200	120
US Top R&B/Hip-Hop Albums (Billboard)	17
US Top Rap Albums (Billboard)	13
US Independent Albums (Billboard)	23
