= Codeine (album) =

Studio album by Z-Ro
- Released: December 1, 2017
- Recorded: 2017
- Genre: Hip hop
- Length: 58:59
- Label: 1 Deep Entertainment; EMPIRE

Z-Ro chronology
No Love Boulevard (2017)	Codeine (2017)	Sadism (2018)

Codeine is the twenty-second studio album by American rapper Z-Ro, released on December 1, 2017, under 1 Deep Entertainment and was distributed by EMPIRE. The album features guest appearances from Lil' Keke, Big Baby Flava, Jhonni Blaze, and Lil Flea. It serves as the sixth entry in Z-Ro's "drug series".

== Track listing ==
No.	Title	Producer	Length
1.	"Owe You Niggaz Shit"	Synesthetic Nation	3:17
2.	"Never Been a Ho"	Synesthetic Nation	3:11
3.	"So Houston" (featuring Lil Keke & Big Baby Flava)	Synesthetic Nation	5:13
4.	"My City"	Synesthetic Nation	4:28
5.	"Smoke Some Weed"	Z-Ro	4:34
6.	"Wanna C Me Fall"	G&B	3:29
7.	"Still a Player"	Z-Ro	3:24
8.	"I'm the Shit" (featuring Jhonni Blaze)	Synesthetic Nation	4:19
9.	"You Would Too"	Beanz & Kornbread	3:56
10.	"I Don't Fucc with You"	Synesthetic Nation	3:34
11.	"Run This Town"	Z-Ro	3:22
12.	"Stay Down"	G&B	4:07
13.	"You Ain't Gotta Worry"	Beanz & Kornbread	3:25
14.	"Hold Up Bitch"	G&B	4:02
15.	"Better Days" (featuring Lil Flea)	G&B	4:29
Total length:			58:59

== Charts ==
Chart	Peak position
US Top R&B/Hip-Hop Albums (Billboard)	41
