= Controversy (Willie D album) =

Studio album by Willie Dee
- Released: December 21, 1989
- Recorded: 1989
- Genre: Hip hop
- Length: 49:11
- Label: Rap-A-Lot
- Producer: DJ Ready Red; Doug King; Lil' J; Prince Johnny C

Willie D chronology
Controversy (1989)	I'm Goin' Out Lika Soldier (1992)

Controversy is the debut studio album by American rapper Willie Dee.

== Singles ==
"Do It Like a G.O." features Willie D, Prince Johnny C, and Sire Jukebox. The song was also released on the Geto Boys album Grip It! On That Other Level, redone with Willie D, Scarface, and Bushwick Bill.

== Critical reception ==
Professional ratings
Review scores
Source	Rating
AllMusic	2/5 stars
The Encyclopedia of Popular Music	2/5 stars

Trouser Press called the album "tedious" and "filled with dull misogynist rants."

== Track listing ==
No.	Title	Length
1.	"Do It Like a G.O." (featuring Geto Boys)	4:38
2.	"Fuck the KKK"	4:19
3.	"Kick That Shit"	4:13
4.	"Willie Dee"	3:33
5.	"Put the Fuckin' Gun Away"	3:45
6.	"Trip Across from Mexico"	4:43
7.	"5th Ward"	4:31
8.	"Bald Headed Hoes"	4:20
9.	"Welfare Bitches"	4:20
10.	"Kinky"	3:17
11.	"I Need Some Pussy" (featuring Choice)	3:42
12.	"Fuck Me Now"	3:50
Total length:		49:11

== Charts ==
=== Weekly charts ===
Chart (1995)	Peak position
US Top R&B/Hip-Hop Albums (Billboard)	53

== Personnel ==
- Clifford Blodget – mixing
- Willie D – composer, performer, primary artist, vocals
- DJ Ready Red – producer
- Doug King – engineer, producer
- Prince Johnny C – producer
