= Drankin' & Drivin' =

Studio album by Z-Ro
- Released: July 15, 2016
- Recorded: 2015–2016
- Genre: Hip hop
- Length: 55:35
- Label: 1 Deep Entertainment; EMPIRE

Z-Ro chronology
Melting the Crown (2015)	Drankin' & Drivin' (2016)	Legendary (2016)

Professional ratings
Review scores
Source	Rating
Pitchfork	(7.2/10)

Drankin' & Drivin' is the nineteenth studio album by American rapper Z-Ro, released on July 15, 2016, under 1 Deep Entertainment and was distributed by EMPIRE. The album features a guest appearance from fellow American rapper Krayzie Bone, of Bone Thugs-n-Harmony.

== Track listing ==
No.	Title	Producer	Length
1.	"Devil Ass City"	Jonathan Zibi	4:47
2.	"My Money"	Nat, Powers, Synesthetic Nation	3:38
3.	"Where the Real"	Track Whippaz	3:47
4.	"Naked Headed Lover"	Jonathan Zibi; Bruce Bang	4:10
5.	"He Hoes"	Jonathan Zibi	4:02
6.	"Since We Lost Y'all" (featuring Krayzie Bone)	Bruce Bang & Albie Dickson	4:46
7.	"Hate Me so Much"	Synesthetic Nation	4:13
8.	"Baby Momma Blues"	Synesthetic Nation	4:15
9.	"New Shit"	Jonathan Zibi; Bruce Bang	4:40
10.	"Hostage"	Beanz & Kornbread	4:58
11.	"I Ain't Gonna Lie"	Jonathan Zibi	4:58
12.	"Successful"	June James	3:25
13.	"Women Men"	Beanz & Kornbread	4:39
Total length:			55:35

== Charts ==
Chart Positions	Peak position
US Billboard 200	99
US Top R&B/Hip-Hop Albums (Billboard)	5
