= The Crown (Z-Ro album) =

Studio album by Z-Ro
- Released: June 23, 2014
- Recorded: 2013–14
- Studio: King of the Ghetto Studio (Houston, TX)
- Genre: Hip hop
- Length: 55:09
- Label: Rap-A-Lot 4 Life; J. Prince Entertainment
- Producer: Mr. Lee

Z-Ro chronology
Angel Dust (2012)	The Crown (2014)	Melting the Crown (2015)

Professional ratings
Review scores
Source	Rating
AllMusic	4/5 stars
RapReviews	5.5/10

The Crown is the seventeenth studio album by American rapper Z-Ro. It was released on June 23, 2014, through Rap-A-Lot Records/J. Prince Entertainment with distribution via RED. Recording sessions took place at King of the Ghetto Studio in Houston. Production was handled solely by Leroy "Mr. Lee" Williams, who also served as executive producer with J. Prince and King Shaun. The album features guest appearances from Chris Ward, Kez, King Shaun and Billy Brasco.

== Track listing ==
No.	Title	Length
1.	"Intro"	0:37
2.	"Keep Shining" (featuring Chris Ward)	3:58
3.	"Exotic Girl" (featuring Kez)	3:46
4.	"Hands Up"	3:45
5.	"Live Your Life"	4:12
6.	"I'm Gone"	3:54
7.	"Kush Drank Pills"	3:38
8.	"Imposters"	3:20
9.	"Love My Dick"	3:54
10.	"Mo City"	3:48
11.	"Love These Bitches"	4:05
12.	"P.A.N." (featuring King Shaun)	4:01
13.	"What It Look Like" (featuring Billy Brasco)	3:57
14.	"The Crown"	4:04
15.	"Coming Dyne"	4:10
Total length:		55:09

== Personnel ==
- Joseph Wayne McVey IV – primary artist, songwriter
- Chris Ward – featured artist & songwriter (track 2)
- Kez Jones – featured artist & songwriter (track 3)
- "King" Shaun Morrow – featured artist & songwriter (track 12), executive producer
- W. "Billy Brasco" Brown – featured artist & songwriter (track 13)
- Leroy Williams Jr. – producer, songwriter, executive producer, mixing (tracks: 1–11, 13–15), mastering
- James A. Smith – executive producer
- Joshua David Moore – mixing, mastering
- Kevin "Supa K" Miles – mixing (tracks: 1–11, 13–15), A&R
- Matt Kennedy – mixing (track 14)
- Tony "Big Chief" Randle – A&R
- Anzel "Int'l Red" Jennings – A&R
- Chris Hall – production coordinator
- Danielgotskillz – artwork
- Mike Mack – marketing and promotions director
- Alvin "Short Dog" Stafford – marketing and promotions director
