= Cocaine (album) =

Studio album by Z-Ro
- Released: October 27, 2009
- Genres: Southern hip hop; gangsta rap
- Length: 1:17:25
- Labels: Rap-A-Lot 4 Life; Asylum; Warner Bros.
- Producers: Z-Ro; Bigg Tyme; Big E; Beans N Kornbread

Z-Ro chronology
Crack (2008)	Cocaine (2009)	Heroin (2010)

Professional ratings
Review scores
Source	Rating
AllMusic	3/5 stars

Cocaine is the thirteenth studio album by American rapper Z-Ro. It was released on October 27, 2009, via Rap-A-Lot, Asylum, and Warner Bros. Records. Production on the album was mostly handled by Z-Ro himself, alongside Bigg Tyme, Big E, and Beans N Kornbread, among others. The album features guest appearances from Chris Ward, Lil' Flip, Big Pokey, Billy Cook, Gucci Mane, Lil' O, and Mike D. The album peaked at number 147 on the US Billboard 200.

== Track listing ==
No.	Title	Producer(s)	Length
1.	"Intro"	Bigg Tyme	4:04
2.	"One Two" (featuring Billy Cook)	Z-Ro	4:10
3.	"Don't Worry Bout Mine" (featuring Big Pokey)	Big E	4:44
4.	"Type of Nigga I Am"	Bigg Tyme	4:12
5.	"Quarterback Vision"	Bigg Tyme	4:01
6.	"I Don't Give a Damn"	Z-Ro	5:38
7.	"Bottom to the Top" (featuring Mike D)	Z-Ro	4:44
8.	"I Can't Leave Drank Alone" (featuring Lil' O)	Big E	4:41
9.	"Doing Just Fine"	Beanz & Kornbread	5:16
10.	"Southside" (featuring Lil' Flip)	Z-Ro	4:35
11.	"Haters Got Me Wrong" (featuring Gucci Mane and Chris Ward)	Z-Ro	4:49
12.	"On My Grind"	Z-Ro	4:48
13.	"Shotta"	Z-Ro	4:49
14.	"Thank You" (featuring Lil' Flip)	Z-Ro	4:39
15.	"But"	Z-Ro	3:54
16.	"Tha Police" (featuring Chris Ward)	Z-Ro	4:41
17.	"Bring My Mail"	Z-Ro	3:42
Total length:			1:17:25

Sample credits

- "Intro" contains a sample of "Happiness" as performed by Maze
- "Don't Worry Bout Mine" contains an interpolation of "Summer Breeze" as performed by The Isley Brothers
- "That's the Type of Nigga I Am" contains a sample of "Sweet Dreams" as performed by Air Supply
- "I Don't Give a Damn" contains samples of "Street Life" as performed by The Crusaders, and "A Dream" as performed by DeBarge
- "Can't Leave Drank Alone" contains a sample of "Feenin'" as performed by Jodeci
- "Bring My Mail" contains a sample of "Ring My Bell" as performed by Anita Ward

== Charts ==
Chart (2009)	Peak position
US Billboard 200	147
US Top R&B/Hip-Hop Albums (Billboard)	19
US Top Rap Albums (Billboard)	7
