= I'm Goin' Out Lika Soldier =

Studio album by Willie D
- Released: September 15, 1992
- Recorded: 1991–1992
- Studio: Track Design Studios (Houston, TX); Ultimate Sound Studios (Houston, TX)
- Genre: Gangsta rap
- Length: 59:40
- Label: Rap-A-Lot; Priority
- Producer: Willie D (also exec.); Crazy C; Goldfingers; John Bido; Roland

Willie D chronology
Controversy (1989)	I'm Goin' Out Lika Soldier (1992)	Play Witcha Mama (1994)

Singles from I'm Goin' Out Lika Soldier
- 1. "Clean Up Man" Released: October 14, 1992

Professional ratings
Review scores
Source	Rating
AllMusic	2.5/5 stars
RapReviews	4.5/10

I'm Goin' Out Lika Soldier is the second solo studio album by American rapper Willie D. It was released on September 15, 1992, through Rap-A-Lot Records with distribution via Priority Records. Recording sessions took place at Track Design Studios and at Ultimate Sound Studios in Houston. Production was handled by Crazy C, Goldfingers, John Bido, Roland and Willie D.

The album peaked at number 88 on the Billboard 200 and at number 27 on the Top R&B/Hip-Hop Albums in the United States. Its lead single, "Clean Up Man", made it to #51 on the Hot R&B/Hip-Hop Songs and to #6 on the Hot Rap Songs.

== Release ==
This album was released after a falling-out with the Geto Boys and refers to the incident on the album in the following lyric "I left Charlie Brown on the cut, 'cause I felt like Snoopy, workin for Peanuts", referring to his feeling of not being properly compensated for his work as an artist. This is a favorite of producer Blockhead.

Willie D debuted the album in August 1992 during an outdoor rally adjacent to the Houston Astrodome when the 1992 Republican National Convention was held where he did a sample of Rodney K.

== Track listing ==
No.	Title	Length
1.	"Profile of a Criminal"
2.	"I'm Goin' Out Lika Soldier"
3.	"Pass da Piote'" (featuring Icy Hott, Klondike Kat, Rasir X & Sho)
4.	"Die"
5.	"Clean Up Man"
6.	"U Ain't No Ganksta"
7.	"Trenchcoats-N-Ganksta Hats"
8.	"Rodney K."
9.	"Campaign 92'"
10.	"Go Back 2 School"
11.	"U Still a Aggin"
12.	"Little Hooker"
13.	"Yo P My D"
14.	"Backstage"
15.	"What's Up Aggin"
16.	"My Alibi"

Notes

- "Profile of a Criminal" and "Backstage" features vocals from Dave Summers
- "Clean Up Man" features backing vocals from Jhiame and dialogue performed by DJ Blaster and Mona Lisa
- "Campaign 92'" features vocals from Jay Lamonte
- "U Still a Aggin" features backing vocals from K-Rino

Sample credits

- "I'm Goin' Out Lika Soldier" contains elements from "Motor Booty Affair" by Parliament
- "Pass da Piote'" contains elements from "Blues Dance Raid" by Steel Pulse
- "Die" contains elements from "Good Old Music" by Funkadelic
- "Clean Up Man" contains elements from "Clean Up Woman" by Betty Wright
- "U Ain't No Ganksta" contains elements from "Gangster Boogie" by Chicago Gangsters and "The Big Gangster" by The O'Jays
- "Rodney K." contains elements from "Mack's Stroll (The Getaway)" by Willie Hutch and "Give It Up or Turnit a Loose (Remix)" by James Brown
- "U Still a Aggin" contains elements from "River Niger" by Sly Dunbar
- "Little Hooker" contains elements from "Homie Don't Play That" by Geto Boys and "Givin' Up the Nappy Dugout" by Ice Cube
- "Yo P My D" contains elements from "Material Girl" by Madonna and "It's a New Day" by James Brown
- "What's Up Aggin" contains elements from "Homie Don't Play That" by Geto Boys
- "My Alibi" contains elements from "Stop the Rain" by Average White Band

== Personnel ==
- William James Dennis – main artist, producer, arranger, executive producer
- Dave Summers – featured artist (tracks: 1, 14)
- Mark "Icy Hott" McCardell – featured artist (track 3)
- Andre "Klondike Kat" Parish – featured artist (track 3)
- Kerry "Rasir X" Wagner – featured artist (track 3)
- Sho – featured artist (track 3)
- Jhiame – backing vocals (track 5)
- DJ Blaster – voice (track 5), scratches
- Mona Lisa – voice (track 5)
- Jay Lamonte – voice (track 9)
- Eric "K-Rino" Kaiser – backing vocals (track 11)
- Simon "Crazy C" Cullins – producer
- Victor "Goldfingers" Diaz – producer
- John Okuribido – producer
- Roland Smith Jr. – producer
- Bernie Bismark – engineering
- Richard Simpson – engineering
- Shetoro Henderson – engineering
- Michael George Dean – mastering
- Roger Tausz – mastering
- Shawn Brauch – artwork
- J. Patrick Smith – artwork
- Pen & Pixel – design
- Edward H. Strickland – concept

== Charts ==
Chart (1992)	Peak position
US Billboard 200	88
US Top R&B/Hip-Hop Albums (Billboard)	27
US Heatseekers Albums (Billboard)	1
