= Crack (album) =

Studio album by Z-Ro
- Released: September 16, 2008
- Genres: Southern hip hop; gangsta rap
- Length: 1:08:54
- Labels: Rap-A-Lot; Warner Bros.; Asylum
- Producers: Z-Ro; Bigg Tyme; Cory Mo; J. Moses; Mr. Lee; Tone Capone

Z-Ro chronology
King of tha Ghetto: Power (2007)	Crack (2008)	Cocaine (2009)

Professional ratings
Review scores
Source	Rating
HipHopDX	4/5
Pitchfork	4.7/10
RapReviews	8.5/10

Crack is the twelfth solo studio album by American rapper Z-Ro. It was released on September 16, 2008, via Rap-A-Lot Records, Warner Bros. Records and Asylum Records. Production was handled by Mr. Lee, Bigg Tyme, J. Moses, Cory Mo, Tone Capone and Z-Ro himself. It features guest appearances from Lil' Keke, Mike D, Mýa, Paul Wall and Slim Thug. The album chronicles the experiences of Z-Ro, like most of his albums. A chopped and screwed remix of the album was done by Michael "5000" Watts and released on October 28, 2008.

== Track listing ==
No.	Title	Producer(s)	Length
1.	"Crack" (Intro)	Bigg Tyme; Z-Ro	2:59
2.	"Baby Girl"	Bigg Tyme; J. Moses	4:08
3.	"Here We Go" (featuring Mike D)	Z-Ro	4:36
4.	"Call My Phone" (featuring Slim Thug)	Z-Ro	4:51
5.	"If That's How You Feel" (featuring Lil' Keke)	Mr. Lee	4:34
6.	"Lonely"	Z-Ro	3:54
7.	"Made"	Bigg Tyme; J. Moses	4:40
8.	"The Mo City Don"	Mr. Lee	4:02
9.	"Top Notch" (featuring Pimp C)	Mr. Lee	3:55
10.	"Rollin"	Z-Ro	4:33
11.	"Tired" (featuring Mýa)	Tone Capone	4:14
12.	"You"	Z-Ro	4:16
13.	"Eyes on Paper" (featuring Paul Wall)	Cory Mo	4:48
14.	"25 Lighters"	Z-Ro	9:21
15.	"Paid My Dues"	Z-Ro	4:08
Total length:			1:08:54

=== Sample credits ===
Top Notch

- "The Overture of Foxy Brown" by Willie Hutch
- "International Players Anthem (I Choose You)" by UGK

Rollin'

- "Holding Back the Years" by Simply Red

25 Lighters

- "25 Lighters" by DJ DMD featuring Lil' Keke & Fat Pat

== Charts ==
Chart (2008)	Peak position
US Billboard 200	48
US Top R&B/Hip-Hop Albums (Billboard)	12
US Top Rap Albums (Billboard)	6
