= Loved by Few, Hated by Many (Willie D album) =

Studio album by Willie D
- Released: October 24, 2000
- Recorded: 2000
- Studio: Hippie House Studios (Houston, Texas)
- Genre: Gangsta rap
- Length: 66:18
- Label: Rap-A-Lot; Virgin
- Producer: J. Prince (exec.); Leroy "Precise" Edwards; Willie D; Hurt-M-Badd; John "Swift" Catalon; Pimp C

Willie D chronology
Play Witcha Mama (1994)	Loved by Few, Hated by Many (2000)	Relentless (2001)

Singles from Loved by Few, Hated by Many
- 1. "Dear God" Released: 2002

Professional ratings
Review scores
Source	Rating
AllMusic	3/5 stars
The Encyclopedia of Popular Music	3/5 stars
RapReviews	4/10
The New Rolling Stone Album Guide	3/5 stars

Loved by Few, Hated by Many is the fourth solo studio album by the American rapper Willie D. It was released on October 24, 2000, through Rap-A-Lot Records/Virgin Records. Recording session took place at Hippie House Studio in Houston. Production was handled by Leroy "Precise" Edwards, Hurt-M-Badd, John "Swift" Catalon, Pimp C and Willie D, with J. Prince as executive producer.

The album peaked at number 124 on the Billboard 200 and at number 25 on the Top R&B/Hip-Hop Albums in the United States. Its lead single, "Dear God", made it to #78 on the Hot R&B/Hip-Hop Songs and to #4 on the Hot Rap Songs.

== Track listing ==
No.	Title	Writer(s)	Producer(s)	Length
1.	"Gun Talk" (featuring Outlawz and Spice 1)	W. Dennis; L. Edwards; M. Greenidge; R. Cooper III; R. Green Jr.	Leroy "Precise" Edwards	5:12
2.	"Wet 'M"	W. Dennis; L. Edwards	Leroy "Precise" Edwards	3:00
3.	"Lil' Killaz"	W. Dennis; L. Edwards	Leroy "Precise" Edwards	4:57
4.	"Dear God"	W. Dennis; L. Edwards	Leroy "Precise" Edwards	3:55
5.	"It Ain't Easy"	W. Dennis; L. Edwards	Leroy "Precise" Edwards; Willie D	4:29
6.	"A Friend"			0:50
7.	"If I Was White"	W. Dennis; T. Wrice	Hurt-M-Badd	4:03
8.	"Slippers Go" (featuring Endo)	W. Dennis; R. Williams; J. Catalon	John "Swift" Catalon; Willie D	4:57
9.	"Dem Boys" (featuring Scarface and Lil' Wayne)	W. Dennis; L. Edwards; B. Jordan; D. Carter	Leroy "Precise" Edwards	3:57
10.	"Pusscndclick"	W. Dennis; L. Edwards	Hurt-M-Badd	4:51
11.	"Fearing Nothing But God"	W. Dennis; L. Edwards	Leroy "Precise" Edwards	3:49
12.	"The Sickness"			0:57
13.	"She Likes 2 Ball"	W. Dennis; T. Wrice; G. Clinton; P. Wynn	Hurt-M-Badd	3:53
14.	"Rendezvous"			0:22
15.	"Freaky Deaky" (featuring Pimp C and Nay Nay)	W. Dennis; L. Edwards; C. Butler; C. Vann	Pimp C	4:21
16.	"I'll Make You Famous"	W. Dennis; L. Edwards	Leroy "Precise" Edwards	3:23
17.	"U Special"	W. Dennis; L. Edwards; J. Harris; T. Lewis	Leroy "Precise" Edwards	4:10
18.	"Hearse Cadillac"	W. Dennis; J. Catalon	John "Swift" Catalon; Willie D	5:12
Total length:				1:06:18

== Charts ==
Chart (2000)	Peak position
US Billboard 200	124
US Top R&B/Hip-Hop Albums (Billboard)	25
