= No Love Boulevard =

Studio album by Z-Ro
- Released: June 30, 2017
- Recorded: 2016–2017
- Genre: Hip hop
- Length: 58:48
- Label: 1 Deep Entertainment; Empire

Z-Ro chronology
Legendary (2016)	No Love Boulevard (2017)	Codeine (2017)

No Love Boulevard is the twenty-first studio album by American rapper Z-Ro, which was released June 30, 2017 under 1 Deep Entertainment and was distributed by Empire. This album was believed to be the last album by the American rapper when he announced his retirement to the Houston Press.

== Track listing ==
No Love Boulevard track listing
No.	Title	Producer	Length
1.	"Lost My Mind"	Synesthetic Nation	3:05
2.	"From the Other Side"	Jon Milli	4:44
3.	"Solid"	Synesthetic Nation	4:16
4.	"Belong to the Streets"	unnamed	3:12
5.	"They Don't Understand"	Z-Ro	4:27
6.	"You's a Bitch"	G&B	4:29
7.	"Brang a Stacc"	Synesthetic Nation	4:35
8.	"Devil in Me" (featuring Ronnie Spencer and Ronetta Spencer)	G&B	6:07
9.	"Play Me"	Z-Ro	3:49
10.	"Kiwi"	G&B	4:43
11.	"Lit Up"	Synesthetic Nation	4:22
12.	"We Are"	DJ Hefna	4:18
13.	"Bye Bye"	Z-Ro	3:01
14.	"He's Not Done"	Synesthetic Nation	3:34
Total length:			58:48

== Charts ==
Chart performance for No Love Boulevard
Chart (2017)	Peak position
US Billboard 200	135
