= Heroin (Z-Ro album) =

Studio album by Z-Ro
- Released: June 21, 2010
- Studios: M.A.D. Studios (Houston, TX); King Of The Ghetto Studio (Houston, TX)
- Genres: Southern hip hop; gangsta rap
- Length: 1:12:09
- Labels: Rap-A-Lot 4 Life; J. Prince Entertainment; Fontana
- Producers: Bigg Tyme; Big E; Mike Dean; Steve Below; Z-Ro

Z-Ro chronology
Cocaine (2009)	Heroin (2010)	Meth (2011)

Professional ratings
Review scores
Source	Rating
HipHopDX	3.5/5 stars
RapReviews	6/10

Heroin is the fourteenth studio album by American rapper Z-Ro. It was released on June 21, 2010, via Rap-A-Lot 4 Life and J. Prince Entertainment, with its distribution from Fontana. Recording sessions took place at M.A.D. Studios and at King of the Ghetto Studio in Houston, Texas. Production on the album was handled by Z-Ro himself, alongside Mike Dean, Bigg Tyme, Big E, and Steve Below. The album features guest appearances from Chris Ward, Billy Cook, Chamillionaire, Lil' Flip, Mike D, Mýa, and Paul Wall. The album peaked at number 142 on the US Billboard 200.

== Track listing ==
No.	Title	Producer(s)	Length
1.	"Never Let It Go"	Mike Dean	3:59
2.	"Denzel Washington" (featuring Paul Wall and Chamillionaire)	Steve Below	4:08
3.	"Driving Me Wild"	Big E	4:36
4.	"Boss" (featuring Mýa)	Bigg Tyme	3:58
5.	"Thug Nigga"	Z-Ro	3:41
6.	"Blast Myself"	Mike Dean	4:18
7.	"Do Bad on My Own"	Mike Dean	4:06
8.	"Real or Fake" (featuring Mike D)	Z-Ro	4:54
9.	"We Don't Speed" (featuring Lil' Flip)	Z-Ro	4:28
10.	"Gangsta Girl" (featuring Billy Cook)	Z-Ro	5:06
11.	"Eyez on da Prize"	Mike Dean	4:40
12.	"Come Back wit It"	Z-Ro	4:13
13.	"Move Your Body"	Z-Ro	4:46
14.	"Rollin' on Swangaz" (featuring Chris Ward)	Z-Ro	4:15
15.	"Let's Ride" (featuring Chris Ward)	Z-Ro	4:36
Total length:			1:12:09

Sample credits

- "Driving Me Wild" contains a sample of "Bump n' Grind (Ol' School Mix)" as performed by R. Kelly
- "Thug Nigga" contains a sample of "When a Woman's Fed Up" as performed by R. Kelly
- "Do Bad on My Own" contains a sample of "Canon in D Major" as performed by Johann Pachelbel
- "Rollin' on Swangaz" contains a sample of "James Bond Theme" as performed by John Barry and Monty Norman

== Charts ==
Chart (2010)	Peak position
US Billboard 200	142
US Top R&B/Hip-Hop Albums (Billboard)	29
US Top Rap Albums (Billboard)	15
US Independent Albums (Billboard)	21
