= King of tha Ghetto: Power =

Studio album by Z-Ro
- Released: May 8, 2007
- Recorded: 2006
- Genre: Southern hip hop; gangsta rap
- Length: 58:22
- Label: Rap-A-Lot; Asylum; Atlantic
- Producer: Z-Ro

Z-Ro chronology
I'm Still Livin' (2006)	King of tha Ghetto: Power (2007)	Crack (2008)

Professional ratings
Review scores
Source	Rating
RapReviews	7/10

King of tha Ghetto: Power is the eleventh studio album by American rapper Z-Ro. It was released through Rap-A-Lot, Asylum, and Atlantic Records on May 8, 2007. The album features guest appearances from Point Blank, Spice 1, B.G. Duke, Big Boss, Big Shasta, D-Bo, Dougie D, Lil' Flip, Mike D, Pimp C, and Vicious. The album peaked at number 197 on the US Billboard 200.

== Track listing ==
All music is composed by Joseph Wayne McVey.

No.	Title	Length
1.	"Bud Sack"	4:03
2.	"I'm a Gangsta" (featuring D-Bo)	4:47
3.	"My Life"	4:33
4.	"Struggling to Change" (featuring Point Blank)	4:38
5.	"Greed"	5:02
6.	"Staying Alive" (featuring Spice 1)	2:26
7.	"Going Down in the South" (featuring Big Boss)	4:30
8.	"Nigga Like Me" (featuring B.G. Duke and Point Blank)	4:13
9.	"Friends"	2:59
10.	"Lovely Day" (featuring Lil' Flip and Big Shasta)	4:15
11.	"Ride All Day"	3:24
12.	"Murder'ra" (featuring Pimp C, Spice 1, and Vicious)	3:59
13.	"M-16" (featuring Mike D and Dougie D)	4:53
14.	"No Games"	4:40
Total length:		58:22

== Charts ==
Chart (2007)	Peak position
US Billboard 200	197
US Top R&B/Hip-Hop Albums (Billboard)	32
US Top Rap Albums (Billboard)	10
