= I'm Still Livin' =

I'm Still Livin

Studio album by Z-Ro
- Released: November 7, 2006
- Studios: Dean's List House of Hits (Cypress, TX); King of the Ghetto Studio (Houston, TX); M.A.D. Studios (Houston, TX); Noddfactor Studios (Missouri City, TX)
- Genres: Southern hip-hop; gangsta rap
- Length: 1:01:17
- Label: Rap-A-Lot 4 Life
- Producers: Bigg Tyme; Dani Kartel; Mike Dean; Mr. Lee; Richard "Enigma" Hervey; Z-Ro

Z-Ro chronology
Let the Truth Be Told (2005)	I'm Still Livin (2006)	King of tha Ghetto: Power (2007)

Singles from I'm Still Livin
- 1. "T.H.U.G."/"Continue 2 Roll" Released: 2006

Professional ratings
Review scores
Source	Rating
AllHipHop	3.5/5 stars
Prefix	8.5/10
RapReviews	9/10

I'm Still Livin is the tenth solo studio album by American rapper Z-Ro. It was released on November 7, 2006, through Rap-A-Lot Records with distribution via Asylum Records. Recording sessions took place at Dean's List House of Hits in Cypress, King of the Ghetto Studio and M.A.D. Studios in Houston, and Noddfactor Studios in Missouri City. Production was handled by Mike Dean, Richard "Enigma" Hervey, Bigg Tyme, Dani Kartel, Mr. Lee, and Z-Ro himself. It features guest appearances from P.O.P., Tanya Herron, Trae tha Truth, Big Hawk, Bun B and Lil' Keke. The album peaked at number 75 on the Billboard 200 in the United States. A chopped and screwed remix was edited by Paul Wall.

== Track listing ==
No.	Title	Writer(s)	Producer(s)	Length
1.	"City Streets"	Joseph McVey; Michael Dean	Mike Dean	5:27
2.	"Continue 2 Roll" (featuring Tanya Herron)	McVey; Dean; Gary Kemp	Mike Dean	3:33
3.	"T.H.U.G. (True Hero Under God)"	McVey; Dean; Luther Vandross	Mike Dean	3:44
4.	"One Deep"	McVey; Dean	Mike Dean	4:22
5.	"M16" (featuring Trae and P.O.P.)	McVey; Frazier Thompson; Richard Hervey	Enigma	4:32
6.	"Remember Me" (featuring Bun B and P.O.P.)	McVey; Bernard Freeman; Marvin Rucker	Z-Ro	4:12
7.	"Keep On"	McVey; Dean	Mike Dean	3:49
8.	"What's Going On"	McVey; Hervey	Enigma	3:38
9.	"Let the Truth Be Told" (featuring Lil' Keke)	McVey; Marcus Edwards; Leroy Williams	Mr. Lee	3:48
10.	"Man Cry"	McVey; Dean; Brad Jordan; Joseph Johnson	Mike Dean	4:30
11.	"No More Pain"	McVey; Randy Jefferson; Dean	Bigg Tyme; Big Mario (co.)	3:24
12.	"Still Livin'" (featuring Big Hawk and Trae)	McVey; Thompson; John Hawkins	Z-Ro	3:57
13.	"Homie, Love, Friend"	McVey; Dean	Mike Dean	3:56
14.	"Love Ain't Live"	McVey; Daniel Castillo	Dani Kartel	4:05
15.	"Battlefield" (featuring Tanya Herron)	McVey; Tanya Herron; Dean; Holly Knight; Mike Chapman	Mike Dean	4:20
Total length:				1:01:17

Sample credits

- Track 2 contains an interpolation of "True" performed by Spandau Ballet.
- Track 3 contains an interpolation of "So Amazing" performed by Luther Vandross.
- Track 10 contains an interpolation of "I Seen a Man Die" performed by Scarface.
- Track 15 contains an interpolation of "Love Is a Battlefield" performed by Pat Benatar.

== Charts ==
Chart (2006)	Peak position
US Billboard 200	75
US Top R&B/Hip-Hop Albums (Billboard)	14
US Top Rap Albums (Billboard)	7
