= Let the Truth Be Told (Z-Ro album) =

Studio album by Z-Ro
- Released: April 12, 2005
- Recorded: 2004–05
- Studios: Dean's List House of Hits (New York, NY); Noddfactor Studios (Denton, TX); M.A.D. Studios (Houston, TX); King Of The Ghetto Studio (Houston, TX)
- Genres: Southern hip hop; gangsta rap
- Length: 1:11:22
- Labels: Rap-A-Lot 4 Life; Asylum; Atlantic
- Producers: Mike Dean; Mr. Lee; Z-Ro; Bigg Tyme; Clay Dixon; Cory Mo; Dani Kartel; Davion Botts

Z-Ro chronology
The Life of Joseph W. McVey (2004)	Let the Truth Be Told (2005)	I'm Still Livin' (2006)

Professional ratings
Review scores
Source	Rating
AllMusic	4/5 stars
IGN	8.2/10
RapReviews	8/10

Let the Truth Be Told is the ninth studio album by American rapper Z-Ro. It was released on April 12, 2005, through Rap-A-Lot Records, Asylum Records and Atlantic Records. Recording sessions took place at Dean's List House of Hits in New York City, at Noddfactor Studios in Denton, at M.A.D. Studios and at King Of The Ghetto Studio in Houston. Production was handled by Mike Dean, Mr. Lee, Bigg Tyme, Cory Mo, Dani Kartel, Davion Botts, "The Beatmaster" Clay D and Z-Ro himself. It features guest appearances from Trae tha Truth, Ashanti, Devin the Dude, Juvenile, Lil' Boss, Lil' Flip and Paul Wall. The album peaked at number 69 on the Billboard 200 in the United States.

== Track listing ==
No.	Title	Writer(s)	Producer(s)	Length
1.	"Mo City Don" (Freestyle)	J. McVey; E. Barrier; W. Griffin	Z-Ro	4:25
2.	"The Mule" (featuring Devin the Dude and Juvenile)	J. McVey; D. Copeland; T. Gray; D. Castillo	Dani Kartel	4:29
3.	"Don't Wanna Hurt Nobody" (featuring Trae and Lil' Boss)	J. McVey; F. Thompson; M. Dean; R. Hargis	Mike Dean	3:31
4.	"Platinum"	J. McVey; R. Jefferson	Bigg Tyme	3:30
5.	"It Don't Stop"	J. McVey; L. Williams	Mr. Lee	3:41
6.	"I'm a Soldier"	J. McVey; M. Dean	Mike Dean	3:35
7.	"1 Night" (featuring Trae)	J. McVey; F. Thompson; L. Williams; L. Russell	Mr. Lee	5:07
8.	"Help Me Please"	J. McVey; L. Williams	Mr. Lee	5:00
9.	"Another Song"	J. McVey; C. Moore; D. Botts	Cory Mo; Davion Botts	4:20
10.	"Everyday, Samethang"	J. McVey; M. Dean	Mike Dean	4:18
11.	"The Same One"	J. McVey; M. Dean	Mike Dean	3:57
12.	"1st Time Again" (featuring Ashanti)	J. McVey; L. Williams; B. Jordan; D. Copeland; W. Rogers	Mr. Lee	4:31
13.	"From the South" (featuring Paul Wall and Lil' Flip)	J. McVey; P. Slayton; W. Weston; L. Williams	Mr. Lee	3:50
14.	"Respect My Mind" (featuring Tanya Herron)	J. McVey; M. Dean; A. Hale; H. Adu; S. Matthewman	Mike Dean; Z-Ro	4:59
15.	"Ride 2 Nite"	J. McVey; M. Dean	Mike Dean	4:33
16.	"Auntie & Grandma"	J. McVey; M. Dean	Mike Dean	4:10
17.	"It's a Shame"	J. McVey; C. Dixon	Beat Master Clay D.	3:26
Total length:				1:11:22

== Charts ==
Chart (2005)	Peak position
US Billboard 200	69
US Top R&B/Hip-Hop Albums (Billboard)	14
US Top Rap Albums (Billboard)	5
