= James Hoover =

American audio engineer (born 1971)

James Hoover (February 28, 1971 in Morgantown, West Virginia) is a Grammy Award-winning freelance audio engineer who has worked with performers such as Beyoncé, ZZ Top, Chamillionaire, South Park Mexican, and many others. Working out of his home base in Houston, Texas, for the past 20 years, James has collaborated with artists, producers, and musicians from around the world.

As a child, James was fascinated by music, learning the piano at age ten. James would often entertain mall patrons when he would play the piano at the resident music store. His talent and affinity for music would continue into high school where he was a member of the marching band, concert band, and jazz studio orchestra. During this time he also taught himself how to play the bass and guitar, adding to his repertoire of piano, synthesizer, trumpet, French horn, and flugelhorn. Over the years, James has been a player in multiple bands, ranging in styles from rock to pop to jazz to metal. James received his Audio Engineering degree from HCCS and graduated with honors in 1991. While in college, he began working as a house engineer for Digital Services Recording Studios, a pioneer in the digital audio world and the birthplace of recordings such as: Destiny's Child's “Survivor,” and Chamillionaire's “Ridin’." Shortly after joining the Digital Services team, he became the head engineer, working for countless clients in every genre of music, film, and spoken word, in both live and studio environments. Currently, James is a self-employed freelance engineer specializing in mixing, mastering and recording.
