= Willie D =

American rapper from Texas

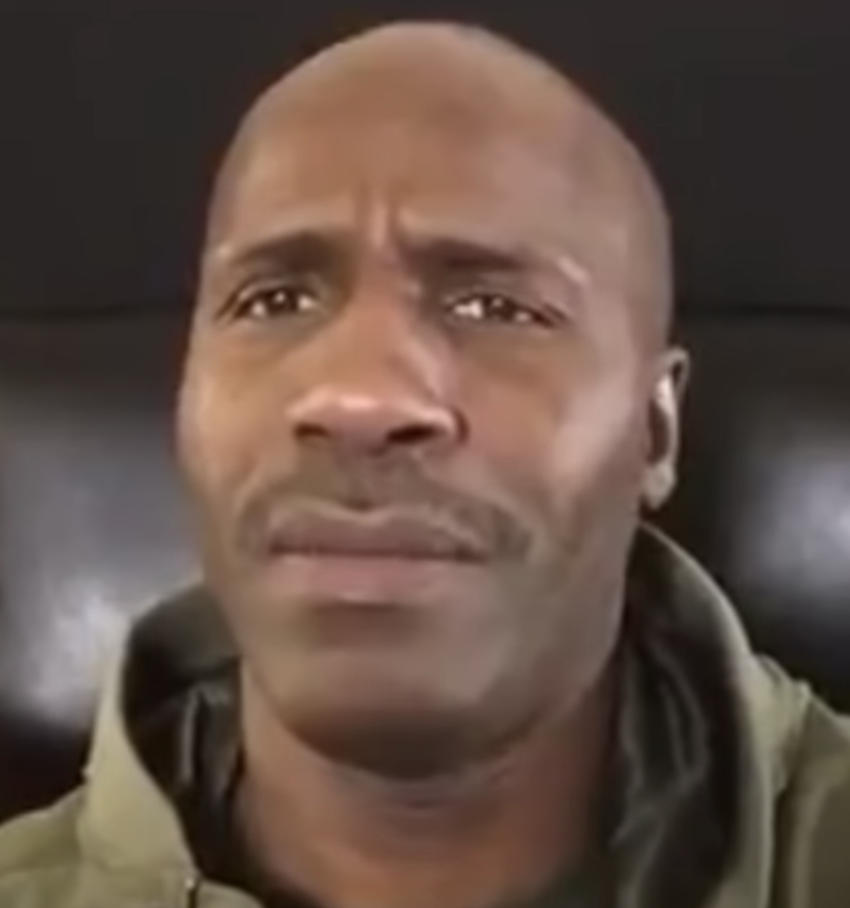
- Willie D in 2017

Background information
- Born: William James Dennis; November 1, 1966 (age 59); Houston, Texas, U.S.
- Genres: Southern hip hop
- Occupations: Rapper; songwriter
- Years active: 1983–present
- Label: Rap-A-Lot
- Member of: Geto Boys
- Website: willied.com

William James Dennis (born November 1, 1966) is an American rapper from Houston, Texas. He emerged as a member of the hip hop group Geto Boys, which he formed in 1986 alongside fellow Houston rappers Scarface and Bushwick Bill. He signed with the regionally-based label Rap-A-Lot Records to release his albums Controversy (1989) and I'm Goin' Out Lika Soldier (1992), the latter of which entered the Billboard 200.

As an online broadcaster, he has been outspoken on political and social issues in Houston. His YouTube channel, created in 2011, has gained one million subscribers as of 2024.

== Early life ==
Willie took up boxing at the age of 11. In 1985, he became the Golden Gloves Champion for the State of Texas. Rather than become a professional boxer, he decided to become a rap music MC. He attended Forest Brook High School but in 1984, two months prior to his scheduled graduation, he was expelled for fighting. He never returned to school.

== Career ==
His reputation reached J Prince, founder of Rap-A-Lot Records. At the time Prince was looking to revamp the Geto Boys and knew that Willie D would be a key factor in the group's success. Once Willie D was on board, Scarface was added to complete the group.

Considered the classic line up, Willie D, Scarface, and Bushwick Bill first emerged as the Geto Boys in 1989 with their gold record, Grip It! On That Other Level. The record contained the songs "Gangster of Love," "Do It Like a G.O.," "Size Ain't Shit," and "Read These Nikes," all penned by Willie D. Willie went on to record a string of critical and commercially successful solo and group albums including the Geto Boys' "We Can't Be Stopped" (platinum), which featured the single "Mind Playing Tricks on Me," co-written by Willie D.

In 2009, Willie D was featured on a song called "Down South Hustlaz", along with Young Buck, Trae, Bun B, and Rick Ross.

He was featured on a track on Mike E. Clark's Extra Pop Emporium along with Insane Clown Posse and Twiztid called Scrubstitute Teachers. In April 2012, he released "Hoodiez" featuring Scarface, D-Boi and Propain. The song quickly went viral and became an internet hit. It is a tribute to slain teenager Trayvon Martin who was shot by neighborhood watchman George Zimmerman.

== Family ==
Willie D's mother, Marvelous Dennis, who later became Marvelous Basey through marriage (died February 14, 1994), was born in Houston, Texas. She named him after his maternal grandfather, Willie Dennis. She was a cafeteria cook for the Houston Independent School District (HISD) for several years. His father, Alfred Deboest (died May 17, 1998), was from Lake Charles, Louisiana. He was a carpenter and construction worker by trade.

Willie D was raised by his mother in Houston after his parents separated when he was four years old. He has stated in interviews that both his parents were alcoholics and that his mother was physically and verbally abusive. Although he rarely saw his father while growing up, when it was discovered that his father had lung cancer, Willie D took him in to live with him before he succumbed to the disease. Furthermore, despite a troubled relationship with his mother, in 1991 he took his first large paycheck from his music royalties and purchased a four-bedroom house for her while he was still living in an apartment.

On September 3, 1994, he married Bridget Bonier, who is a mechanical engineer, in a private ceremony on a yacht in Clear Lake City, Texas. They have two children, a daughter, Caen (pronounced Cain), who was born April 26, 1995, and a son, Blake, born July 8, 1999. They were divorced in 2010. Willie D has four siblings, Karen Williams (half), Warren Vann (half), Ernestine Dennis, and Isaac Dennis (half).

== Boxing career ==
Willie D began boxing at the age of 11, and won the Golden Gloves for the state of Texas in 1985. He went on to choose a career as a rapper over turning professional, but he eventually returned to boxing during the 1990s. He won his first professional fight in 1992, knocking out Melle Mel at a charity boxing show by accident after the two bumped heads in the first round. Willie D had two more fights between 1999 and 2000, beating Charles Aguilera by TKO in October 1999 and John Tarmon by KO in June 2000, and drew against John Washington on August 24, 2000. In Willie D's last professional fight, he lost to Yameen Muhammad by TKO in October 2000.

== Legal issues ==
In 1984, after turning 18, Dennis and Ronald Hope were arrested for holding up a gas station and were held for several months awaiting trial. A 1992 Houston Chronicle article stated that Dennis did six months in jail for aggravated robbery. Dennis was still in attendance at Forest Brook High School prior to his 1986 expulsion.

Dennis was sentenced to deferred adjudication in 1994 for an alleged theft of service concerning a car repair bill.

Dennis was arrested by FBI agents on May 13, 2009, on federal wire fraud charges, stemming from his purported sales of Apple iPhones through a company known as Texas One Wireless after luring potential buyers off Ebay (which he had used to build a reputation as a reliable seller); victims would pay for the electronics, after which all contact would cease and their products would fail to be delivered. The total amount defrauded was alleged to be $194,087.17 (according to authorities investigation the 35 claims of fraud related to the case). Willie D was sentenced to a year in federal prison in December 2010 after pleading guilty to all charges. He was given BOP#99063-179 and spent his sentence at FCI Beaumont and FDC Houston.

== Cryptocurrency ==
Willie D partnered with Saitama Inu token. This token was later found to be a fraud, resulting in first-ever criminal charges against financial services firms for market manipulation and “wash trading” in the cryptocurrency industry.

== Discography ==
=== Studio albums ===
- Controversy (1989)
- I'm Goin' Out Lika Soldier (1992)
- Play Witcha Mama (1994)
- Loved by Few, Hated by Many (2000)
- Unbreakable (2003)

== See also ==
- Thug Life – 2001 American crime drama film in which Willie D appears
